= List of June (comics) stories =

A list of stories in British weekly girls' comic June, published between 1961 and 1974 by Fleetway Publications and IPC Magazines.

== The 3 Dees ==
Published: 20 January to 28 July 1973
Author: Linda Blake

A family keep farm at Furzebrook with some odd animals - notably brave Scottie dog Duncan, gluttonous donkey Daisy and mild-tempered lion Desmond, who work together to keep everyone safe and happy.

- Text story.

== Adventure School ==
Published: 29 January 1966 to 15 April 1967
Artist: Dudley Wynne

Kay Douglas wants to be an instructress at the famous Ravensdale Adventure School in the Lake District, and sneaks in to learn about as many outdoor activities as possible to help her case.

- Reprinted as "School for Sports" between 7 July 1973 and 15 June 1974.

== Against All Odds ==
Published: 18 March to 7 October 1961

After her father dies, June Hurst helps her mother run the family's riding stable in Framwell, with beloved horse Blaze and foal Cobweb. However, greedy local businessman Sam Fletcher wants to build a road through the stables, bullying local surveyor Cyril Moss into helping him.

== The Amazon Adventurers ==
Published: 12 July to 23 August 1969
Illustrator: Bill Mainwaring

Julie Carson travels through the Amazon rainforest with her father Stanley and brother Bob, searching for signs of a lost expedition which disappeared investigating the Angry Mountain ten years before. Journeying there they find themselves kidnapped by a lost, technologically advanced race called the White Ghosts.

- Text story.

== Angie's Angel ==
Published: 7 August to 2 October 1971
Artist: Carlos Freixas

Angela West's family rally around to raise the money to get the talented girl into art school in London.

== Ann's South Sea Adventure ==
Published: 9 October 1971 to 15 January 1972
Writer: Alan Jason
Artist: Edward Dudley Pout

Holidaying with her Uncle Ben on his boat in the South Seas, Ann finds herself caught up in the affairs of an island tribe after their chief's son Taibu stows away on board.

== Annie's Army ==
Published: 20 January to 26 May 1973
Artist: Robert MacGillivray

Annie is the daughter of Colonel Cleaver and lives on base with his unit, the 2nd Battalion of the Royal Loamshires. However, her antics often cause absolute chaos for the men - to the excitement of most, but much to the irritation of Sergeant Vole.

== Babette the Brave ==
Published: 16 October 1965 to 15 January 1966
Writer: Michel Regnier
Artist: Paul Cuvelier

After a plane crash in the Pyrenees, a group of potholers led by the valiant Babette Marcel make their way towards the survivors to provide medical aid.

- Reprinted from Dientje.

== Babs of the Ballet ==
Published: 19 August 1972 to 13 January 1973
Writer: Denise Wackrill
Artist: Shirley Bellwood

In order to get the financial backing the Highfield Ballet Academy needs to survive, the company accept businessman's daughter Lois, leaving Babs Markham in charge of training the hopeless girl to become a dancer.

- Text story.

== Bambi's Children ==
Published: 18 March to c. June 1961
Author: Felix Salten

- Text comics adaptation of the novel Bambi's Children.

== Bessie Bunter ==
Published: 30 January 1965 to 15 June 1974
Artist: Cecil Orr

Bessie Bunter is an oversized, gluttonous and none-too-smart pupil boarding at Cliff House School.

- One page humour strip. The character of Bessie (sister of Billy Bunter) was previously in the original School Friend, and was revived in the comic version. Continued in Tammy.

== Bijli ==
Published: 28 August 1971 to 13 May 1972
Writer: Denise Wackrill
Artist: Reginald Ben Davis

The adventures of a curious and friendly mongoose.

- Text story.

== The Bike Betty Built ==
Published: 21 July to 13 October 1973
Artist: Philip Townsend

Betty Blake is left with permanent leg damage by a car crash which kills her parents, and finds no comfort from her new guardian, miserable Aunt Gladys. However, she finds she can ride a bicycle expertly, which greatly boosts her happiness, and she persuades a local greengrocer to give her a chance to work as his delivery rider.

== The Black Pearls of Taboo Island ==
Published: 18 March to c. June 1961

Ellie Grant's father dreams of upgrading his dispensary on a coral island where they live into a full hospital. After one of their patients tells Ellie of a legend of a volcanic island that produced black pearls, a treasure that would easily fund their hopes, Ellie and her pet monkey Koko set off to find them.

== Bobs of Bowmans Green ==
Published: 8 April 1967 to 1 June 1968
Artist: Stanley Houghton

Roberta Townley - known to her friends as 'Bobs' - dreams of becoming a vet. She wins the post of assistant to Mr. Mason at Bowmans [sic] Green veterinary surgery, and starts putting her skills into helping the locals and their animals.

== Boss of Beadle Street ==
Published: 31 March to 14 July 1973
Artist: Audrey Fawley

An unrepealed bylaw grants whoever lives at the site of the Old Beadle's house has a claim to ownership of all of Beadle Street. Current resident Liz Green discovers the archaic ruling and decides to claim her rights. She gets them, but soon finds being in charge of a street isn't all she thought it would be.

== Call Me Cupid ==
Published: 10 April to 26 June 1971
Artist: Bill Baker

Belinda Lane takes it upon herself to find a new beau for her sister Cherry after her fiancé Bill skips out on their wedding to go to an FA Cup match.

== The Castaway Kidds ==
Published: 16 March to 1 June 1963
Artist: Edward Dudley Pout

Brought up by their Aunt Agnes in Stepney, orphans Wendy, Tom and Rosabelle Kidd receive a letter offering them the chance to live with their Uncle Roger on a Pacific island. However, a storm forces their plane to ditch and the trio find themselves cast away on a different - and deserted - island.

- No relation to the Dandy strip of the same name.

== Cherry and the Children ==
Published: 30 January 1965 to 13 January 1968
Artist: John Armstrong

Cherry Bryant looks after siblings Sue and Tim - as well as Boxer the dog - while her mother works at a cigarette factory, keeping them all safe despite the quartet always getting into scrapes.

- Continued from Girls' Crystal and School Friend.

== A Christmas Miracle ==
Published: 22 to 29 December 1973

Hard-hearted Carol Price finally finds some affection for stray dog Bobby after his owner dies.

== Cilla the Chiller ==
Published: 2 September to 18 November 1972

The mischievous ghost of Mistress Cilla haunts Ardupp Hall, teaching disrespectful guests lessons.

- One page humour cartoon. Later in June Book of Strange Stories and Misty Annual 1981 to 1983.

== Cinderella Sam ==
Published: 4 January to 1 March 1969
Artist: Carlos Freixas

Shy but kind boarding school pupil Samantha Clayton is subject to a bullying campaign led by fifth-former Sybil Jay, who repeatedly frames her as a coward.

== Cinderella Sue ==
Published: 13 to 20 October 1973

Orphaned Sue Gibson lives a simple but happy life on a farm working with an old lady until her aunt and uncle return from abroad, and is less than happy. Despite the kindness of her lovely cousin Norma, Sue becomes increasingly bitter as she believes her new guardians are mocking her homely looks.

== Cloris and Claire - The Sporting Pair ==
Published: 18 March 1961 to 4 June 1966
Artist: Roy Wilson

Sport-mad friends Cloris and Claire rarely get as far as games due to their propensity for mix-ups and confusion.

- One-page humour cartoon.

== Conflict on Corfito ==
Published: 4 February to 27 May 1967
Writer/s:
Artist/s: Bill Mainwaring

Two families compete to find treasure on an Italian island - but children Nina Gasperi and Carlo Albanesi find they have common ground, and want to avoid the bitter competition.

- Reprint of "Island Feud" from School Friend.

== Could This Be You? ==
Published: 20 November 1971 to 18 March 1972

An anthology story featuring girls in situations similar to those readers might find themselves in - having a crush on teacher, being bad tempered, feeling left out - and showing a resolution.

== Crusaders' Castle ==
Published: 27 November 1965 to 22 January 1966
Artist: Thomas Laidler

Betty Blake's Uncle Oliver inherits Crusaders' Castle on a small island off the coast of Cornwall, where she lives with her siblings Tim, Tom and Jessica. However, the family ends up in debt to the island owner My. Sistrom, who tries to use it to drive the family away.

== Cry-Baby Chrissie ==
Published: 14 October 1972 to 13 January 1973
Artist: Robert MacGillivray

Christine 'Chrissie' Cooper is a student at St. Martha's School for Girls, where her extreme shyness causes her to regularly burst into tears when the centre of attention. She is frequently bullied as a result, with only kindly Brenda Thompson as a friend. One day, Chrissie buys a ring in an antique shop and suddenly finds herself transformed into a more confident person, and begins standing up for herself.

== Dark Destiny ==
Published: 20 October 1973 to 2 February 1974
Artist: A. E. Allen

New at school together and both orphans, Diana and Cara become friends. Cara has a strange ring and an unusual tattoo on the sole of her foot, and Diana becomes curious about her odd behaviour and the gaps in her memory.

== Daron of the Islands ==
Published: 21 November 1964 to 27 March 1965
Artist: Reginald Ben Davis

Trudy Lomax is secretary to Professor Simpson on an expedition to search for a Roman galley in the South Seas, and soon becomes fascinated with the strange native boy Daron.

- Modified reprints of "The Boy Who Guarded Faraway Isle" from School Friend.

== Diana's Diary ==
Published: 18 March 1961 to 5 June 1965
Artists: Robert MacGillivray, Colin Merrett

Diana Todd receives a diary for her 11th birthday and fills it with the fun and games of her family's daily life.

- Later modified and reprinted as "Meet the Merries" between 8 March 1969 and 10 January 1970.

== Dinah's Ugly Duckling ==
Published: 3 May to 28 June 1969

Dinah Sherwood runs a beauty salon in the Hotel Italia on the Sardinian Coast, and faces the biggest challenge of her career when the snooty Chesney family arrives for a function. She finds the only kind member - a young plain girl called Jackie - needs her help the most.

== Dottie Doogood ==
Published: 17 April to 6 November 1971

Kind-hearted Dottie's good deeds backfire.

- Half-page humour cartoon.

== Down Our Street ==
Published: 5 January to 18 May 1974
Writer/s:
Artist: Manuel Cuyás Durán

Jessie Blake lives a happy working class life with her cocky brother Darren, her mother who believes the boy can do no wrong and her father.

== Emma in the Shade ==
Published: 28 August to 13 November 1971
Artist: Juan Solé

Emma Lorne deals with the burden of thinking she has to live up to her famous parents - an actor and an artist - and the pressure the expectations of others bring to her school life.

== The Family at Surprise Corner ==
Published: 18 July 1964 to 28 December 1968
Writer: Scott Goodall

Sally Starr lives with her family in an antiques store called Surprise Corner, and always finds surprising things happening in her life.

- Continued from Poppet.

== The Firebird ==
Published: 11 May to 15 June 1974

Jilly Lewis arrives in Venice to stay with her penfriend Fiametta de Paravani, only to find the girl's grandfather is being threatened by local hoods. Jilly and Fiametta set about thwarting the thugs.

== Flight to Adventure ==
Published: 12 August to 7 October 1967
Artist: Tom Kerr

After their plane crashes in the South American jungle, air hostess Linda Martin is left looking after children Peter and Jane Wesley as they try to make their way back to civilisation.

- Modified reprint of "The Aerial Castaways" from Girls' Crystal.

== Flying Mane ==
Published: 16 March to 15 June 1963
Writer: James Stagg
Illustrator: Colin Merritt

Living on Dartmoor, Ruth looks after her horse Flying Mane and a foal, despite the objections of local landowner Derek Duke.

- Text story.

== Fourth Form Wonder ==
Published: 20 January 1968 to 11 January 1969

Raised in Tibet, Lan Trafford learns the secrets of the Yogis, including the power of levitation. She transfers to the famous Harfield House School in England, and soon puts her talents to thwarting the schemes of Jacob Yarwood, who wants to force the school to close. Lan is helped by her friend Frankie - though jealous senior Sybil Bromley is determined to expose Lan's secrets.

== Freedom Train ==
Published: 20 January to 6 April 1968
Artist: Eric Kinkaid

Jill Williams is among a group of refugees fleeing the advancing Japanese army in Burma. She has an important package she must deliver to her father in Rangoon, with the group travelling via the Burma Belle - an aging steam locomotive driven by family friend Ned Parry.

- Reprint of "Burma Belle" from Girls' Crystal.

== Friends of the Wilds ==
Published: 27 November 1965 to 4 June 1966

Living with her cold guardian Uncle Matt in Wyoming, Mandy Morgan finds a weak orphaned foal she names Lonesome and secretly tries to nurse him back to health.

- Reprint of "Lonesome - the Horse That Won Her Heart" from School Friend.

== From Big House to Backstreet ==
Published: 22 July to 18 November 1972
Artist: Jim Baikie

After Jenny Lawrence's father dies suddenly she and her mother are plunged into poverty, and find living tough outside the upper classes.

== Gail's Dancing Double ==
Published: 16 November 1963 to 25 January 1964
Artist: Leslie Otway

Gail Dawson's resemblance to prima ballerina Karen Grant sees her asked to swap places with the dancer as Karen tries to clear her fiancé's name.

- Reprinted as "Double for Danger" between 16 October 1971 to 1 January 1972.

== The Ghosts of St. Gilda's ==
Published: 2 February to 15 June 1974

The spooky adventures of the Sixth Form of St Gilda's School for Ghosts.

- One-page humour cartoon.

== The Girl With No Heart ==
Published: 8 January to 19 March 1972

Zara, an emotionless scout from the planet Zenith, uses her mind-controlling ring to infiltrate Earth, masquerading as a schoolgirl as a precursor to invasion. Only classmate Tessa Martin seems aware of Zara's unusual behaviour, and tries to convince her sceptical peers of the threat.

== Glenda Good-and-Bad ==
Published: 20 May to 19 August 1972
Artist: Phil Gascoine

After Glenda Marsh gets a blow to the head she exhibits a split personality, switching between kind and spiteful. Her best friend Jane Leslie tries to negotiate her violent mood swings.

== Glory Knight - Time-Travel Courier ==
Published: 4 July 1970 to 3 April 1971
Artists: John M. Burns

Working for Time-Travel Holidays, Glory Knight is a pilot ferrying holidaymakers into Earth's past. However the jaunts usually end up even more exciting than expected.

== Go-It Alone Gail ==
Published: 25 November 1972 to 10 February 1973

Gail Hegan is the daughter of a police inspector, and things become awkward when her father arrests her best friend Terry Payne's dad. However the pair become convinced he has the wrong man and work with their friend Tina Kettle to find the real crooks.

== The Growing Up of Emma Peel ==
Published: 29 January to 16 April 1966

Young Emma Knight travels the world on her father John's yacht Ocean Queen, learning martial arts and trying to stop her friend Princess Asha of Fezra being forced into an unwanted arranged marriage with a sheik.

- Based on the character from the television series The Avengers; the adult version of Emma was appearing with John Steed in a licensed strip in rival publisher Polystyle Publications' TV Comic at the same time "The Growing Up of Emma Peel" was running in June.

== The Guinea Pig ==
Published: 19 February to 15 July 1972

Council schoolgirl Greta Porter wins a scholarship to the exclusive Firdale College for Young Ladies, but soon finds her snobby classmates less than welcoming. Unfortunately for them, Greta has plenty of experience standing up for herself.

- Not to be confused with the Eagle story of the same name.

== Gymnast Jinty ==
Published: 13 September 1969 to 16 September 1972
Artist: Jim Baikie

Acrobatic Jinty Lewis begins work as a junior sports mistress at Sandbury School, where her dexterity and agility - not to mention her kind, sunny personality - are a fast hit.

== The Haunting of Harriet ==
Published: 16 March to 8 June 1974

Harriet Faye leaves school with no family, but is left the dilapidated Shudder Mill on the coast of Essex. The locals, including a brash young boy called Mark, warn her the mill house is haunted, but with nowhere else to go Harriet has to find out for herself.

== Henrietta's Horse ==
Published: 28 April to 14 July 1973

Henrietta Harker desperately wants to own a horse but her biggest obstacle is that she lives in the city centre. Nevertheless, she wins a 2-year old thoroughbred called Billy Bravo in a competition and has to work out how to look after him - especially as council regulations forbid it.

== Her Highwayman Father ==
Published: 29 January to 13 August 1966

In 1750s England, Amy Lyndon's father is accused of being a notorious highwayman and he is forced to go on the run. Amy soon finds their home at the Grange attracting the attention of all sorts of unsavoury characters.

- Reprint of "Loyal to Her Highwayman Father" from School Friend.

== His Guiding Starr ==
Published: 20 January to 28 July 1973

After their mother dies, Starr Goodwin devotes herself to looking after her blind brother Timmy. The pair try to keep each other's spirits up after their fisherman father is reported lost at sea off the Faroes.

== A Horse Called September ==
Published: 16 March to 15 June 1974
Author: Anne Digby
Illustrator: Eduardo Feito Perez

Living on Chestnut Farm where their fathers both work, Anna Dewar and Mary Wilkins care for the magnificent horse September.

- Text story. Later reprinted in Tammy between 7 August and 13 November 1982.

== The Houseboat Family ==
Published: 20 January to 4 May 1968
Writer: Denise Barry

Lindy Gale shares stories of her family's life on houseboat The River Queen.

- Text story.

== I Want to Be a Nurse! ==
Published: 1 April 1967 to 11 May 1968

Marion Lockwood's aunt and uncle are unsure of letting her become a nurse until Tony Anson, a specialist at Leycross Hospital, persuades them to let her. However, Marion is soon on the wrong side of jealous fellow nurse Lana Symes, who attempts to get her in trouble with matron Sister Trevelan.

- Text story; no relation to the picture strip story of the same name from Girls' Crystal.

== I'll Never Leave You ==
Published: 10 February to 4 August 1973

After Amy Lester is hospitalised and her mother killed in a car accident, Amy's 14-year old best friend Ruth Jackson - blaming herself for the crash - vows to look after her. However, things are complicated when a change of jobs looks set to force the Jacksons to emigrate to New Zealand.

== In the Swim ==
Published: 8 February to 8 March 1969

Kitty Jordan tries to arrange a swimming team from the pupils of Queenscourt Educational College.

- Text story.

== Janey's First Term ==
Published: 19 January to 9 March 1963
Author: Rosemary Jones
Artist: Leslie Otway

- Text story.

== Jenny ==
Published: 18 March 1961 to ?

A young girl's endless invention and energy frequently scuppers her father's attempts to get some peace and quiet.

- Half-page humour cartoon.

== Jill in the Dark ==
Published: 11 July to 3 October 1970

Ever since their mother died, Lynn Roberts has looked after her younger sister Jill. However, their life gets even harder as Jill's promising athletics career is derailed when she starts to lose her sense of sight.

- Reprinted in Jinty Annual 1977.

== A Job for Jo ==
Published: 20 May to 12 August 1972
Writer: Sally Blake

The charmed career of babysitter Jo.

- Text story.

== Kathy at Marvin Grange School ==
Published: 18 March 1961 to 6 September 1969

Despite growing up at Tolliver Orphanage, Kathy Summers gets into the exclusive Marvin Grange private school and tries hard to fit in with her different surroundings.

- Later renamed "Kathy at Marvin Grange".

== Life at St. Luke's ==
Published: 30 January 1965 to 30 July 1966

The story of trainee nurse Jenny Jones as she works her way up the ladder at St. Luke's Hospital.

== Loneliest Girl in the Ballet ==
Published: 16 March to 1 June 1963

Jill Baker is delighted when her tutor Madame Carlotta assigns her as understudy to the prima ballerina Krassova. However, when an accident takes the star out of the performance Jill's friends turn on her, believing she caused it to advance her own career.

== The Lonely Ones ==
Published: 20 November 1971 to 5 February 1972?

An outcast at school due to her stutter and shyness, Kate Shaw finds a kindred soul in the shape of an abandoned Gypsy horse called Nelson. The pair look after each other as Kate tries to keep Nelson secret from her disapproving, violent parents.

== Long-Legged Peg ==
Published: 9 March 1968 to 15 March 1969

At six foot tall, Peg Parry towers over her fellow Third Formers at Rushmere Grange, and fast develops a reputation as a livewire.

- Modified reprints of "Maypole at School" from Girls' Crystal.

== Lucky's Living Doll ==
Published: 30 January 1965 to 15 June 1974
Writer: Frank Redpath
Artist: Robert MacGillivray

As her widowed mother works hard to put food on the table, Lucinda Ursula Cynthia Kate Yolanda Smith - or just Lucky for short - keeps the house in order. On the 11th hour of the 11th day of the 11th month of her 11th year, she wishes her doll comes to life - and it does.

- Continued from School Friend

== Mandy Makes News ==
Published: 25 May to 28 September 1963

Mady wants to be a reporter, and starts working in the offices of the local Millchester Messenger, but soon finds herself getting caught up in a story about pop singer Johnnie Starr.

- Later modified and reprinted as "Sandy's Scoops" from 17 January to 23 May 1970.

== Mara of the Islands ==
Published: 5 July 1969 to 4 July 1970

Raised on the Pacific island of Levu, Mara is an incredible swimmer and a friend of marine life. She is spotted by the greedy American entrepreneur Van Doren, who plans to turn Mara into a water park act, who lures her to Honolulu in an attempt to capture her, but reckons without her loyal dolphin friend Dolphie, who follows her to help.

== Mark of the Cat ==
Published: 15 April to 22 July 1972

In occupied France, the daring resistance fighter known as The Cat battles the Gestapo.

- Reprinted from School Friend.

== Me and My Dog Lonesome ==
Published: 26 August to 18 November 1972

Young nurse Karen finds herself volunteering to take care of a hospitalised elderly patient's dog, despite being unequipped to do so.

== Me by Pepi ==
Published: 22 June 1964 to 10 April 1965
Writer: L.E. Ransome (as Ida Melbourne)

The diary of poodle Pepi, relating his adventures with owner Meg.

- Text story.

== Melody for Mimi ==
Published: 20 January to 14 April 1973

Orphaned Mimi LaRue hates life with her indifferent aunt and uncle, as well as her cruel cousin Marianne, who don't even let her practice her beloved violin. Instead she begins finding more support from the kindly working-class Perkins family.

== Mimi the Mesmerist ==
Published: 11 December 1965 to 7 May 1966

Mimosa May Michigan - Mimi for short - is a schoolgirl from St. Ethelfreda's School, can mesmerise anyone. However, she has absolutely no control over when she uses her powers, or who she uses them on.

- Previously in Schoolgirls' Picture Library.

== Mini Ha-Ha ==
Published: 20 January 1973 to 19 January 1974

The adventures of young pidgin English speaking squaw Mini Ha-Ha, her mule Doughnut and her rabbit Stewpot.

- One-page humour cartoon.

== Miss Adventure ==
Published: 25 September to 4 December 1965
Artist: Giorgio Giorgetti

Before he died, Jacey North's father - a Hussars colonel - trained Jacey North to fight, ride and shoot. Now she seeks thrills around the world with her reluctant valet Albert, earning the nickname 'Miss Adventure'.

- Also in Schoolgirls' Picture Library.

== Moses and Me ==
Published: 5 January to 18 May 1974

After her mother dies, Georgie Bell faces life alone with her beloved dog Moses. However, her mother's bullying cousin Jim Peters decides to move himself in with the pair, and begins treating Georgie like a servant before selling off their cottage and moving them away, trying to leave Moses behind.

== My Brother's a Nut! ==
Published: 4 September 1971 to 1 January 1972

Jilly Carter tries to keep her ambitious, impulsive older brother Ned from getting himself in too much trouble.

== My Dog Cuddles ==
Published: 18 March 1961 to 5 September 1964
Artist: Arthur Martin

The misadventures of a clumsy dog.

- Quarter-page humour cartoon. Reprinted as "Poochie" between 24 March 1973 and 8 June 1974.

== My Family, My Foes! ==
Published: 4 August to 29 December 1973

16-year old Lesley Fraser is inexplicably cut off from her family by her father, who dies soon afterwards. Stunned by the whole affair and given cryptic instructions to take a letter to relatives in Brocharbour, Lesley begins to find out she and her family have something mysterious in their history.

== My Friend Leo ==
Published: 19 January to 9 March 1963

Millionaire heiress Kim Cassidy keeps her friendship with street artist Leo Devene secret after tutor Miss Vellors convinces her father the boy is no good. However, it soon becomes clear Miss Vellors may not have Kim's best interests at heart.

== My Friend Sara ==
Published: 30 January 1965 to 13 January 1973
Artist: Ernest Ratcliff

Schoolgirl Wendy Lee relates stories about her friend Sara Topper.

- Continued from School Friend. Later modified and reprinted as "My Friend Kate" between 29 July 1972 to 13 January 1973.

== My Name is Nobody ==
Published: 20 November 1971 to 16 September 1972

When her parents are killed in the Blitz, London teenager Margie Mills finds some happiness caring for a young girl left with amnesia, who she names Nobody. However, the authorities plan to send them to separate homes, causing Maggie and Nobody to go on the run.

== Mystery Hunt ==
Published: 21 July to 22 September 1973

Debbie Yates and Sue Baker holiday with Debbie's Uncle Sam on the coast of East Yorkshire and go treasure hunting - and promptly stumble across a smuggling operation on nearby Maundy Isle.

== The Mystery of Banshee Towers ==
Published: 18 March to 15 July 1961
Author: Enid Blyton
Illustrator: Eric Parker

- Serialisation of The Mystery of Banshee Towers.

== The Mystery of Beacon House ==
Published: 30 January to 17 April 1965
Artist: Reginald Ben Davis

In 1754, Anne Bellew arrives to stay with her uncle at Beacon Heights, and soon begins he might be involved in piracy. Given that he is called Cap'n Jonas Darke, Anne may well be onto something.

- Modified reprint of "The Riddle of Beacon Heights" from School Friend.

== The Mystery of Merlin Island ==
Published: 26 August to 21 October 1972

Sisters Polly and Bee Gillray help their father run a boarding kennel on the small Merlin Island. However a crime kingpin is hiding out on the island and turns his attention to the Gillrays after Bee unwittingly takes his picture at a carnival.

== Mystery Stables ==
Published: 25 October to 13 December 1969

Sue Flanders is the new instructor at Orchard Stables Riding School, but one of her new pupils seems to be determined to cause her problems.

- Text story.

== No Place for Nell ==
Published: 20 November 1971 to 8 April 1972?

Victorian orphan Nell tries to find somewhere she can call home. An opportunity presents itself in a travelling show ran by a kindly woman called Ma, but greedy people seem determined to spoil it for her.

== Nurse Valiant ==
Published: 14 October 1961 to 7 September 1963

Beth Valiant is hired as nursemaid to the children of the president of Santa Rica. Her work is soon complicated when a revolution strikes the country, forcing Beth and the two boys on the run as she tries to keep her charges safe.

- Later modified and reprinted as the adventures of Lisa Daniels in "Nurse Daring" between 3 May 1969 and 14 February 1970.

== Nursing is My Life ==
Published: 30 September 1967 to 26 April 1969

Anne Arnold is a student nurse at St. Audrey's Hospital in Porchester, and hopes to get a full posting on the children's ward there.

- Reprints of "I Want to Be a Nurse!" from Girls' Crystal.

== Oh, Tinker! ==
Published: 29 March to 27 December 1969
Artist: Trini Tinturé

Enthusiastic novice fairy Tinker is sent to Earth to hone her skills, and naively grants wishes for the people she encounters - though often with unintended consequences.

== Olly Goes to School ==
Published: 7 April to 12 May 1973

Daughter of an absent-minded archaeologist living off the Cornish coast, Mary Moore is enrolled at the Castamere Boarding School in Somerset. She is accompanied by her mischievous pet otter Olly, who immediately causes mayhem.

== Orphans Alone ==
Published: 17 April to 9 October 1971
Artist: Tom Kerr

Orphans Beth and Tim Coombs try to make their way in Victorian era London and avoid being put in separate workhouses.

- Modified reprint of "Always Together" from School Friend.

== Orphans of Italy ==
Published: 20 January to 28 December 1968

Left orphaned following a flood, Nella Tambroni makes her way southern Italy to her uncle's distant home in the North by foot, and accompanied by her loyal donkey Pasqualino.

== Overland Adventure ==
Published: 14 September 1963 to 18 January 1964

After finding themselves orphaned, the four Cade siblings - Jane, Gerry, Della and Peter - set off in their old family car Belinda, driving overland to their uncle's home in Australia.

- Modified and reprinted at "The Travelling Trents", with the surnames changed, between 10 June and 16 September 1972.

== Patsy on the Warpath ==
Published: 13 September to 27 December 1969
Artist: John Armstrong

When new Banchester Comprehensive teacher Miss Rabbitt is targeted by a group of bullies headed by Johnny Bedford, spiky Patsy Dean and her best friend Muna form a gang of their own to stop him.

== Penny Plain of Dock Lane ==
Published: 23 September 1972 to 3 February 1973

Penny Woolley is known as Penny Plain for both her looks and her blunt speech, but many of her neighbours from Dock Lane find that her straightforward approach and kind nature gets things done.

== Peta and the Farthing Elf ==
Published: 24 June to 7 October 1972

Peta Williams finds an old farthing, and when she spins it an elf appears, promising to do her biding. However, the mischievous creature often makes things a lot more complicated for all concerned.

== Pony Trek Penny ==
Published: 19 September 1970 to 29 May 1971
Writer: Linda Blake

Penny Baxter is in charge of pony treks at the Phoenix Hotel, but the arrival of the owner's prim daughter Gail Morris on thoroughbred mare Starlight upsets the applecart. When Gail complains that Penny's piebald Pancho is being violent towards Starlight, Penny flees on her beloved horse.

- Text story.

== Poor Polly Flinders ==
Published: 16 February to 15 June 1974

Despite being from a poor family, Polly Gray is proud and independent - attributes she doesn't lose when her mother takes a job at the exclusive boarding school, Waldersley House, where she must contend with the jibes of her posh and privileged peers.

== Princess Gina and the Black Shadow ==
Published: 31 May to 6 September 1969

Count Radek hopes to depose Princess Gina of Rosania and install himself on the throne, but she escapes. Making friends with a peasant girl called Hansi and aided by the Masked Black Shadow, Gina sets about exposing Radek's treachery.

- Reprint of "The Rebel Princess" from School Friend.

== Promise Me, Paula! ==
Published: 2 September 1972 to 6 January 1973

15-year old Birmingham schoolgirl Paula Hope tries to look after her ailing mother, with her father being preoccupied by his work. Her mother dies of tuberculosis, and on her deathbed makes Paula promise to look after her father.

== Ranch of Secrets ==
Published: 4 March to 20 May 1967
Artist: Reginald Ben Davis

Left in charge of Four Winds Ranch in Oklahoma after her father's premature death, Shiree Hudson stands firm against those who would try to drive her off.

- Reprint of "Four Winds Ranch" from School Friend.

== The Reluctant Nurse ==
Published: 20 November 1971 to 5 February 1972?

Pat Sellars wants to be an actress but makes a promise to train as a nurse first. Initially unenthusiastic and uncommitted as she fits nursing around play rehearsals, Pat gradually becomes more interested in helping her patients.

== The Reluctant Rich Girl ==
Published: 9 December 1967 to 2 March 1968

Bored of the life of a pampered rich girl, Sandie McShane slips away from her wealthy parents' home on the Caribbean island of Barmudos to live in a waterside shack. Sandie soon makes friends with a group of less privileged children - and then leads them in an assault on the sensibilities of Barmudos high society.

== The Richest Dog in the World ==
Published: 13 September to 27 December 1969
Artist: Jesus Redondo

Hilda Barton's dog Rascal is left a diamond mine by her grandfather and becomes the wealthiest mutt in the world - and thus targeted by a string of kidnappers and extortionists.

== Riding to Adventure ==
Published: 11 November 1961 to 17 February 1962

June Hurst and her beloved mare Blaze always seem to end up in trouble.

== Robina Hood ==
Published: 26 March to 17 June 1972

Mary Slade wants to be a police officer when she is older, like her late father. In the meantime she begins a campaign fighting for the rights of local kids against harsh businessman Albert Sheriff. Using the pseudonym Robina Hood, she soon becomes a local hero, aided by local junior reporter Rick Danvers.

== Rosita and Her Puppets ==
Published: 18 July to 17 October 1964

Despite having a cruel stepmother, Italian village girl Pepita brings joy to the community with her puppet shows.

- Continued from Poppet; modified reprints of "Pepita and Her Puppets" from School Friend.

== Roxanne - Fighter for France! ==
Published: 13 November 1965 to 1 January 1966
Writer: Jean Theydon

Roxanne Dunant hides a French Resistance fighter on her farm as the Nazis hunt him down.

- Text story.

== The Sad Ghost ==
Published: 2 June to 28 July 1973

Laura is a pupil at Markham Grange, which is widely believed to be haunted. She sees the ghost herself, and finds the spirit to be a Victorian maid called Becky Jones, falsely accused of stealing a diamond necklace. Laura vows to help prove her innocence so her spirit can rest.

== Safari Hotel ==
Published: 21 February 1970 to 6 March 1971

Siblings Trisha and Don Waring run the Safari Hotel in east Africa, and often end up getting caught up in spats between poachers and local tribes.

== Sarina - Beloved Princess ==
Published: 3 April 1965 to 2 April 1966

Princess Sarina of Lichenburg often performs acts of kindness and visits with her subjects incognito.

- Reprints of "Princess Anita" from School Friend.

== The Sea Urchins ==
Published: 4 August 1973 to 2 March 1974
Author: Linda Blake

Jandy Urchin lives with her father in a lighthouse in Trepollen, and finds her life turned upside-down by the arrival of her city-dwelling cousin Liz.

- Text story.

== Secret Agent 13 ==
Published: 26 January to 9 March 1963
Artist: John McLusky

After her home company of Zaania falls to a coup while she is away, Lissa Anders volunteers to go undercover as Agent 13 and get a crucial message to the resistance movement.

== Secret of Bell Mountain ==
Published: 31 October 1970 to 17 April 1971

Travelling to the Alps to take part in a winter sports competition, Jean Darby finds her task complicated when local thugs attempt to kill her cousin Michael Brown. Jean tries to unravel the mystery while competing.

- Modified reprint of "The Legend of Bell Mountain" from School Friend.

== Seraphina and Sam ==
Published: 8 April to 15 July 1972

Spoilt Burmese cat Seraphina and goat Sam decide to start travelling the world together.

- Reprinted in School Friend Annual 1974.

== Serena from Space ==
Published: 14 September 1968 to 22 March 1969
Artist: Rodrigo Rodrígue Comos

Schoolgirl Sue is befriended by Serena, a visitor from the planet Arctus. Serena is looking for the parts of an ancient crystal needed to save Arctus from destruction, and Sue joins her in the quest to find them.

== She Couldn't Remember! ==
Published: 23 September to 9 December 1972

A car crash wipes schoolgirl Sally Shaw's memory, and her friend Ann tries to restore it. However, not all of the things Sally starts to remember are easily explained.

== She Had to Swim ==
Published: 23 June to 6 October 1962

13-year old Louise Gale lives with her parents on the small island of Farron off the northwest coast of Britain, where she enjoys swimming and hopes to one day compete. However, she is torn when her parents decide they will have to return to the mainland to find better-paying jobs.

- Later reprinted between 20 January and 31 March 1973.

== She's Impossible! ==
Published: 7 July to 6 October 1973

Spanish princess Juanita is sent to Whitehaven School in England, but her spoilt behaviour and royal airs soon see her struggle to fit in, much to the annoyance of pupils Ann and Lee, who are put in charge of helping her settle in.

== Shelagh's Shadow ==
Published: 17 June to 26 August 1972

Shaken by the death of her mother, Ann refuses to swim. However, her guardian Mr. Murdock wants to promote a swimming champion and begins playing her off against school champion Shelagh to make it happen.

- Later reprinted in Jinty Annual 1978.

== The Silver Savage ==
Published: 20 January to 26 May 1973

Hetty Brandon is the put-upon maid to Sir Roger of Morvern House. However her life is changed when Sir Roger takes possession of a strange silver-haired girl named Silva who has a remarkable ability to control horses. Silva quickly escapes on Sir Roger's prize horse Gambler and hides out on the moors, inspiring Hetty to join her.

== Silver Skates ==
Published: 19 January to 9 March 1963

Aspiring ice skater Anita Lang is delighted when she makes friends with Penny Torring, a crippled girl new to her school, and things get even better when she finds Penny's father owns an ice rink. However, she finds out how much Penny wants to skate as well and vows to help her, against Mr. Torring's wishes.

== The Sindy Set ==
Published: 22 April 1967 to 13 November 1971
Writer/s:
Artist: Phil Townsend

The real live Sindy introduces tales of the adventures of herself, her sister Patch and her boyfriend Paul as she starts up a fashion boutique.

- Based on the fashion doll manufactured by Pedigree Dolls & Toys. After the strip finished, a Sindy Club Page continued to run until 1973.

== Singin' Jinny ==
Published: 17 February to 21 April 1973

Jinny Grey has a beautiful singing voice but is forbidden to use it by her father. However, a new music teacher arrives at the school called Miss Wood begins to encourage her to do so, believing Jinny to simply be shy.

== Sister of the Bride ==
Published: 20 January to 23 March 1973

As their parents died when they were young, sisters Jill and Kathy Ward live together and are very close. However, the younger Kathy becomes worried and jealous when Jill becomes engaged to a young man called Mike.

== Slapdash Sal and Her Brainy Pal ==
Published: 4 August to 15 December 1973

Helen Tarrant and Sal Petrie are the daughters of scientist Professor Tarrant and his assistant Mr. Petrie, and accompany their fathers on a geological expedition to Scotland. Left to their own devices while their fathers work, the mismatched pair soon find themselves at odds with the local unfriendly MacGrimm clan.

== Slaves of the Sleeping Ones ==
Published: 12 June to 24 July 1971
Artist: Juan Solé

Pat Simmons and her special friend Jean Blake are making their way back across the moors to Cranmere School when they see a strange creature at an abandoned house, and become determined to get to the bottom of it.

== Souper Cat ==
Published: 20 November 1971 to 1 April 1972

Cowardly moggy Purrsy is so enamoured with soup that a sip of it turns him into a fearless, muscular fighting machine.

- One page humour strip.

== Speed-Girl Julie ==
Published: 20 January to 13 July 1968
Artist: Reginald Ben Davis

Hoping to get away from a joyless life with her unsupportive, bullying uncle and aunt on a farm, Julie Trent practices in secret in the hope of becoming an athlete.

== Stranger in the Family ==
Published: 21 April to 7 July 1973

Penny Andrews has to host her cousin Lorna after the latter's mother dies in prison. However, Lorna's rude and violent behaviour soon threatens to turn them both into social outcasts.

== The Strangest Stories Ever Told ==
Published: 30 January 1965 to c. 1974
Writers: Scott Goodall, Len Wenn, Terry Magee
Artist/s: Mike Hubbard

The debonair Storyteller dispenses spooky stories.

- Continued from School Friend.

== Sunshine Susie ==
Published: 20 January 1968 to 29 January 1969

Bright, cheeky Susie frequently turns the tables on her parents.

- Half-page humour strip, skipped in some issues.

== Susan's Circus Days ==
Published: 25 February to 1 July 1967

Susan Webster lands a job in the circus thanks to her friend, tightrope walker Julie Byrd. However, soon after she starts at the circus it looks like she is causing trouble.

- Reprint of "Stars of the Circus" from School Friend.

== Swim to Safety! ==
Published: 27 October 1973 to 4 May 1974
Artist: Phil Townsend

Geraldine 'Dina' Evans arrives in Shanghai to meet with her parents after three years in boarding school, and does her best to adapt to Chinese customs. Shortly after she arrives at her parents' mission school they are called away to help plague victims in a nearby village, leaving Dina in charge. The school is attacked by bandits, and she is forced to evacuate the pupils on a hazardous down-river raft journey to the safety of Shanghai.

== Sylvie on a String ==
Published: 29 September 1973 to 2 March 1974
Artist: Tony Higham

Sylvie Miller put her gymnastics career on hold to care for her gran in a village in northern England, and will seemingly miss out on a place at a school in order to look after her frail relative.

== The Taming of Ted ==
Published: 11 May to 6 July 1968

Tansy Swift tries to impart some decorum into local moron Ted Carew.

- Text story.

== Tea-Trolley Nurse ==
Published: 2 June to 20 October 1973

Unable to train as a nurse due to her family, Sue Midgeley instead takes a job as a tea-girl in a hospital while studying nursing in her spare time. Her posh cousin Elizabeth is a nurse at the same hospital, requiring Sue to hide her identity, but she finds a friend in the supportive Gloria.

== Tennis Star Tina ==
Published: 6 June to 7 October 1961
Writer: Anne Digby
Artist: Giorgio Giorgetti

Living with her foster-mother at a small shack in Boomer on the north Australian coast, where they make a humble living collecting coral from the Great Barrier Reef. She dreams of becoming a world famous tennis player, but training is not easy in the area.

- Later reprinted as "Tennis Star Toni" from 27 May to 5 August 1967.

== They Call Me a Coward! ==
Published: 3 July to 28 August 1971

Cathy Price is branded a coward by her peers and tries to redeem herself.

== The Three Jays Ride Again ==
Published: 18 March to 5 August 1961
Author: Pat Smythe

The adventures of horse-riding trio Jacky, Jimmy and Jane.

- Serialisation.

== Tilly's Magic Tranny ==
Published: 14 July 1973 to 6 April 1974

An implausible series of events see a mystical jewel from a mystical turban included in the components of a transistor radio purchased by schoolgirl Tilly Trainer. Naturally whenever the device plays music it therefore has a strange influence over people.

== Trudy on Trial ==
Published: 24 June to 19 August 1972

Trudy's eccentric uncle sets her a series of bizarre tests, rewarding her with a portion of a £100 cheque for each one she passes.

- Later reprinted in Jinty Annual 1979.

== The Twin She Couldn't Trust ==
Published: 27 October 1973 to 2 March 1974
Artist: Phil Gascoine

After her aunt dies, Helen May sets out to look for her long-lost identical twin sister Linda, who had to be adopted by others when their parents died. She finds that Linda has led a tough life, and is bitter at being left behind. Nevertheless, Helen does her best to reach out to her embittered twin.

== Vanessa from Venus ==
Published: 16 March 1963 to 7 September 1968
Writer: Scott Goodall

Science fiction fan Sally Prentice's dream comes true when she is befriended by Vanessa, a powerful and friendly Venusian capable of casting magic spells, who soon joins her at school.

== The Voice of Glyndarron ==
Published: 13 October 1962 to 12 January 1963
Artist: John McLusky

Gwenny Parry's voice makes her known as 'The Voice of the Valley' in the colliery town of Glyndarron, where she also cares for her blind brother Dai. On a trip to Cardiff decides to enter a singing competition to earn the money to buy a guide dog for Dai.

- Later modified and reprinted as "The Lark of Llandarth" between 8 January and 8 April 1972.

== The Way of a Champion ==
Published: 30 January to 27 March 1965
Writer: Alick Hayes

After her mother dies, Pam Farleigh is forced to move to London. She is able to keep her beloved horse Dr. Syntax, but only if the equine can earn its way in show-jumping competitions. With help from new friend Kay Simpson, Pam has Dr. Syntax brought to London so she can train with amiable Battersea instructor Mr. Roberts.

- Text story. Adapted from Pam and Dr. Syntax.

== When Did You Last See Your Father? ==
Published: 18 March to 20 May 1961

Celia Vane's father Sir Jeremy Vane leaves home to fight for the Royalists in the English Civil War, and lives alone at Vane Manor - until Roundheads arrive searching for him.

== Where the Heart Is ==
Published: 26 September 1970 to 27 March 1971

Promising Australian water skier Judy Dean finds her promising career detailed when her parents hit marital trouble, plunging her into depression as they argue. However, her friend Tony has an idea - staging Judy's kidnapping to bring her parents back together.

== Wild Girl of the Hills ==
Published: 3 April to 21 August 1971
Artist: Carlos Freixas

Jean Ross lives on the estate of Lord Carnach, where her father works as a gamekeeper. One day she becomes lost in a mist and meets a strange gypsy girl who seems to be able to communicate with animals.

== Zanna of the Jungle ==
Published: 29 January 1966 to 12 August 1967
Artist: Reginald Ben Davis

Raised in a deep jungle in central Africa, the wise and brave Zana is able to command animals to do her biding - and soon becomes acclaimed as the Queen of the Jungle.

- Previously in Schoolgirls' Picture Library. Reprinted in June from 22 January to 3 June 1972.
