= List of School Friend (comics) stories =

A list of stories in British weekly girls' comic School Friend, published between 1950 and 1965 by the Amalgamated Press and Fleetway Publications.

== Always Together ==
Published: 25 May to 23 December 1963
Artist: Tom Kerr

Orphans Beth and Tim Coombs try to make their way in Victorian era London and avoid being put in separate workhouses.

== Babs and the Family ==
Published: 26 November 1960 to 22 September 1962
Artist: Cecil Orr

Babette Briand relates the antics of her madcap family.

- Translated into French and published in Filette by Société Parisienne d'Édition.

== Ballet Comes to the New Town ==
Published: 12 October 1963 to 1 February 1964

The Mariane School of Ballet in Dorlington - including Gaye Farrel and her friends Dave, Bob, Sylvia, Joe, Jill and Laurie - prepare to put on a ballet to remind the young people of the new town about the charms of its older institutions.

== Bessie Bunter ==
Published: 25 May 1963 to 23 January 1965
Artist: Cecil Orr

Bessie Bunter is an oversized, gluttonous and none-too-smart pupil boarding at Cliff House School.

- One page humour strip. The character of Bessie (sister of Billy Bunter) was previously in the original School Friend; continued in June.

== The Boy Who Guarded Faraway Isle ==
Published: 5 May 1956 to 9 March 1957
Artist: Reginald Ben Davis

Trudy Lomax is secretary to Professor Simpson on an expedition to search for a Roman galley in the South Seas, and soon becomes fascinated with the strange native boy Daron.

- Later reprinted in June. Translated into French and published in Filette by Société Parisienne d'Édition.

== Candy and the Mystery Speed Boy ==
Published: 9 May to 24 October 1959

Mayberry School pupils Candy Duncan and Sheila Lang find an errand to pick up old bikes for a charity event quickly becomes complicated when a motorcyclist begins leaving them cryptic notes.

== Carol of Honeysuckle Ranch ==
Published: 9 July 1955 to 7 January 1956

In the 1880s, Carol Wayne returns to her hometown of Redwood after a year at boarding school, finding that her luckless grandfather has built up a mountain of debt. She resolves to raise money to prevent his beloved Honeysuckle Ranch being sold.

== Cherry and the Children ==
Published: 25 May 1963 to 23 January 1965
Artist: John Armstrong

Cherry Bryant looks after siblings Sue and Tim - as well as Boxer the dog - while her mother works at a cigarette factory, keeping them all safe despite the quartet always getting into scrapes.

- Continued from Girls' Crystal, continued in June.

== Cherry's Alpine Schooldays ==
Published: c. December 1954 to 7 May 1955

Newly arrived at Alpine School, Cherry Lee soon receives a mysterious music box and some unusual instructions to decipher. Soon she has a whole group of friends helping her crack the case - before the sinister Vincent Van Dorn can.

- Front cover strip. Also in Schoolgirls' Picture Library #108 as "Cherry Comes to Alpine School".

== Claire, Special Agent ==
Published: 26 August to 23 December 1961
Artist: Robert MacGillivray

Claire Raymend uses her wits to keep vital secrets out of the hands of foreign agents.

== Companion to Cleopatra ==
Published: 12 September to 28 November 1953
Artist: W. Bryce-Hamilton

In ancient Egypt, talented musician Charmion is taken under the wing of the kind Queen Cleopatra, but has to deal with jealous maid of honour Tharna and her scheming father.

- Also in Schoolgirls' Picture Library #66.

== Companion to the Millionaire's Daughter ==
Published: 11 October 1958 to 4 April 1959

Realising his daughter Betty Lou is turning into a spoilt brat, California millionaire Harvey Q. Wilchester hires a nice English girl to keep her on the straight and narrow.

== Dancers in Secret ==
Published: 1960 to 4 March 1961
Artist: Reginald Ben Davis

Famous ballet star Madame Irina is framed for stealing a ruby and goes into hiding. Trained by a masked expert at Falconburg Castle, Janice Shaw soon realises her teacher is none other that Irina, and vows to keep her secret and clear her idol's name.

== Denise and the Scarab Ring ==
Published: 20 May to 26 August 1950

Visiting Egypt to see her Uncle Mark, Denise Fraser is entrusted with a scarab ring which soon sees her targeted by the so-called Moon of the Desert; thankfully, the heroic Sheik Haroun is on hand to keep her safe.

== Dilly Dreem, the Loveable Duffer ==
Published: 20 May 1950 to 23 January 1965
Artist: Dora Broderick

Scatter-brained schoolgirl Dilly frequently gets the wrong end of the stick and causes good-natured confusion.

- A long-running one-page humour strip.
- After a brief hiatus in 1961, Dilly returns in the 28 October issue in a new series "Dilly at Work", which takes place after she has left school. She goes into business with her old headmistress' nephew Benedict Blunt, who is an inventor.
- In the 8th December 1962 issue Dilly is back at school in "Dilly Dreem's Schooldays" and on 30 March 1963, shortly before the merger with Girls' Crystal this strip moves to the back cover where it appears in colour. It remains there until 21 March 1964, before being moved inside again.
- Also in Schoolgirls' Picture Library #267 and #279.

== Dolly Diddle's Jolly Riddles ==
Published: 29 September to 29 December 1962
Artist: Robert MacGillivray

Upbeat Dolly irritates passers-by with her wordplay.

- Front cover strip.

== Ella and the Enchanted Garden ==
Published: 21 May to 10 September 1960

Ella Saunders finds some refuge from her miserable foster-mother Mrs. Leech when she befriends Carol Cunliffe, who invites Ella around to her spacious and beautiful gardens. However, Mrs. Leech's brother steals Carol's necklace, and Ella resolves to get it back for her friend.

== Flame the Outlaw Horse ==
Published: 24 March to 21 July 1951

Wyoming girl Jean Gray competes in cross-country horse races with the stallion named Flame.

== Fleurette - Brave Daughter of France ==
Published: 10 July to 13 November 1954

When Nazis occupy France, village girl Fleurette Bonnard helps Maquis fighters to safety - using her job as a bakery girl as a cover.

- Also in Schoolgirls' Picture Library #63 and Princess Picture Library #86.

== Flight to Adventure ==
Published: 28 October 1961 to 3 February 1962
Artist: Jack Hardee

Julie Roger is excited enough at becoming an air stewardess, and finds her first flight has the former president of Cartania on board. Things then become even more dramatic when the plane is hijacked.

- Front cover strip. Translated into French and published in Filette by Société Parisienne d'Édition.

== Flights of Fancy ==
Published: 28 March to 5 September 1964

After winning £5000 on her Premium Bond, Fancy Riley gives up teaching to follow her dream, buy a plane and become a pilot.

== Four Winds Ranch ==
Published: 8 April to 19 August 1961
Artist: Reginald Ben Davis

Left in charge of Four Winds Ranch in Oklahoma after her father's premature death, Shiree Hudson stands firm against those who would try to drive her off.

== The Gay Cavalier ==
Published: 20 May to 22 July 1950
Artist: W. Bryce-Hamilton

In 1644, Celia Harcourt helps young Cavalier Roger de Stacey complete a mission for her father.

== The Gay Young Dancers of Harmony Theatre ==
Published: 2 November 1957 to 9 August 1958

When Lisa Borrelli's dance school is hit by lightning and burns down, four of her pupils renovate a dilapidated theatre to raise funds to buy her a new site.

- Translated into French and published in Filette by Société Parisienne d'Édition.

== Gaye and Mr. X ==
Published: 4 March to 20 May 1961

Gaye finds herself drawn into aiding a secret agent known as Mr. X against the schemes of the Baron and his niece Olga.

- Translated into French and published in Filette by Société Parisienne d'Édition.

== Grey Mask - Lola's Gallant Helper ==
Published: 10 March to 16 June 1951

Visiting her brother in Mexico, dancer Lola Dering finds herself taken by the heroic outlaw Grey Mask

== Her Dream Dog of the Moors ==
Published: 16 August 1958 to 28 February 1959
Artist: E.C. Julien

Nona Lorne's dreams seem to come true when she meets a stray dog that takes an instant shine to her; however, she must keep the animal secret from her uncle, who is prejudiced against dogs after an accident which killed his wife.

== Her Secret Mission for King Charles ==
Published: c. November 1952 to 21 March 1953
Artist: W. Bryce-Hamilton

During the height of the English Civil War, the noble Cavalier Sir Geoffrey Deepwood is sent on a vital mission for King Charles. After Sir Geoffrey is injured, his resourceful daughter Valerie must get a vital sword past the Roundheads.

- Reprinted as "The Sword of Freedom" in Princess in 1967. Also in Schoolgirls' Picture Library #84 as "Valerie and the Sword of Freedom", redraw by Artur Horowicz.

== Island Feud ==
Published: 9 September to 30 December 1961
Artist: Bill Mainwaring

Two families compete to find treasure on an Italian island - but children Nina Gasperi and Carlo Albanesi find they have common ground, and want to avoid the bitter competition.

- Translated into French and published in Filette by Société Parisienne d'Édition.

== Jane and the Ghostly Hound ==
Published: c. May 1960
Artist: Robert MacGillivray

A hound called Carlo helps Jane Stedman uncover a plot to murder widow Mrs. Farnfield

== Janet's Jungle School ==
Published: 7 June 1958 to 10 January 1959

Working with her uncle at a village in Indochina, Janet sets up a school for the local children - and grabs the attention of jungle boy Kendru.

- Translated into French and published in Filette by Société Parisienne d'Édition.

== Jill Crusoe ==
Published: 20 May 1950 to 23 January 1965
Writer: Johnny Johnson
Artist: Reginald Ben Davis

Jill Blair and young friend Sally become marooned on Paradise Isle, and make fast friends with native girl M'Lani, a leopard called Katzi and a parrot called Polly. Awaiting rescue, they soon find out that not all passing ships are helpful.

- Initially introduced in 1950's "Jill Crusoe, Castaway", Jill and her friends went on to become one of School Friend's most popular features, returning in "Friends of Paradise Island" the following year. In 1952 this became the long-running "Jill Crusoe and the Mystery Schooner", which morphed into "Jill Crusoe and the Land of the White Queen" into 1953. "Jill Crusoe and the Golden Bell" ran from 1954 to 1955, and in 1959 it was "Jill Crusoe and the Stranger from the Sea". The story also featured in Schoolgirls' Picture Library #36 and #45.

== Jon of the Jungle ==
Published: 22 December 1951 to 14 June 1952?

Joining her uncle's expedition to the African jungle searching for a lost ancient city, Dinah Meredith becomes fascinated by a primitive local boy called Jon.

- Also in Schoolgirls' Picture Library. Translated into French and published in Filette by Société Parisienne d'Édition.

== Judy Swims to Fame ==
Published: 21 May to 24 September 1960
Artist: Robert MacGillivray

Judy Malvern wants to become a champion swimmer, but must keep her training from her uncle who is embittered after his wife died in a bathing accident.

== Julie's School at Silver Creek ==
Published: 28 March to 7 November 1953

At the tail end of the 19th century, Julie Crawford travels to Buffalo Springs to take up a post as school mistress, but soon gets caught up with dashing outlaw Kit Kennedy.

== Katy of Cedar Creek ==
Published: 22 June 1957 to 18 October 1958?
Artist: Reginald Ben Davis

With her family's ranch at risk of takeover by the evil Crowley, Katy Jackson resolves to master the wilful horse Duke and win the Grand Prix to alleviate the financial concerns of herself, her brother Tommy and her little sister Dodo.

- Modified and reprinted as "Judy of Juniper Creek" between 30 May and 16 November 1964.

== Kim the Wonder Dog ==
Published: 2 September 1950 to 6 January 1951

Canadian girl Pam's Alsatian Kim is such a marvel he is targeted by thieves - who reckon without the pair's determination.

== King Arthur's Secret ==
Published: c. May to c. July 1955

Hired as a governess by affable Cornishman Mr. Farnfield, Sandra Mayhew soon gets involved in intrigue when the household's scheming butler Crichton gets amiable tutor Roderick fired. The sacked academic then writes to Sandra, telling her of a mysterious link to King Arthur which explains Crichton's odd behaviour.

== Legend of the Trolls ==
Published: 26 December 1964 to 23 January 1965

Ingrid Jansen meets strange creatures living near Jarheim in Norway.

== Lonesome - the Horse That Won Her Heart ==
Published: c. October to December 1959

Living with her cold guardian Uncle Matt in Wyoming, Mandy Morgan finds a weak orphaned foal she names Lonesome and secretly tries to nurse him back to health.

- Reprinted of as "Friends of the Wilds" in June.

== Lorna of Falcon's Nest ==
Published: 21 February to 13 June 1953

Living in the old Cornish cottage at Falcon's Nest, Lorna Penhale spots suspicious activity through her telescope, centred on a mysterious island and naturalist Frank Hemsley.

== Lost in Red Man's Land ==
Published: 12 December 1953 to 3 July 1954
Artist: Reginald Ben Davis

A pioneer family make their way to a new life in distant Oregon.

== Loyal to Her Highwayman Father ==
Published: 7 March to 26 December 1959

In 1750s England, Amy Lyndon's father is accused of being a notorious highwayman and he is forced to go on the run. Amy soon finds their home at the Grange attracting the attention of all sorts of unsavoury characters.

== Lucky's Living Doll ==
Published: 16 November 1963 to 23 January 1965
Writer: Frank Redpath
Artist: Robert MacGillivray

As her widowed mother works hard to put food on the table, Lucinda Ursula Cynthia Kate Yolanda Smith - or just Lucky for short - keeps the house in order. On the 11th hour of the 11th day of the 11th month of her 11th year, she wishes her doll comes to life - and it does.

- Continued in June as "Lucky and Tina".

== Madcap Rebecca ==
Published: 29 April to 26 August 1961
Artist: Robert MacGillivray

Growing up on a barge with her widower artist father, Rebecca Drake picks up all manner of anarchic habits.

== Maid Marian and the Golden Arrow ==
Published: 30 September 1950 to 3 March 1951
Artist: W. Bryce-Hamilton

With King Richard away on the Crusades, Maid Marian works to prevent King John and his henchman Sir Hugo from using an archery competition for a Golden Arrow to trap the valiant Robin Hood.

- Also in Schoolgirls' Picture Library #69.

== Mam'selle X ==
Published: 25 May 1963 to 23 January 1965

Actress Avril Claire is not popular in Occupied France, as she performs for the German troops. But what nobody knows is that she is in fact Mam'selle X, a member of the French Resistance.

- Previously in Girls Crystal; continued in June and Tammy.

== Mark of the Cat ==
Published: 12 September to 19 December 1964

In occupied France, the daring resistance fighter known as The Cat battles the Gestapo.

== Mary and the Masked Pirate ==
Published: 14 November 1953 to 13 March 1954
Artist: W. Bryce-Hamilton

Orphan Mary Marlow travels to Kingston, Jamaica to live on the plantation of Olivia Fairfax - who she soon finds is being exploited by the local governor. Hope is at hand, however, due to the dashing Masked Pirate.

- Also in Schoolgirls' Picture Library #99.

== The Masked Ballerina ==
Published: 7 January to 17 November 1956

Grey Gables School ballet dancers Vicki Kildare and Jo Mostyn find themselves receiving help from a mysterious masked dancer.

- Front cover strip.

== My Friend Sara ==
Published: 10 February 1962 to 23 January 1965
Artist: Ernest Ratcliff

Schoolgirl Wendy Lee relates stories about her friend Sara Topper.

- Front cover strip. Continued in June.

== Mystery Dog of the Highlands ==
Published: 14 April to 20 October 1956

Fiona Starr desperately tries to find the secret of the ruined Castle Kildair before the greedy Denvers family can buy it, and gets help from a mysterious dog called Faithful.

- Also in Schoolgirls' Picture Library #116.

== The Outlaw's Daughter ==
Published: 31 May to 4 October 1952

Doreen Calvert emigrates to Mexico to live with her father, only to find he is living a double-life as the Masked Shadow, a wanted outlaw pursued by Tony Graham. Doreen works to clear her father's name before he is captured.

- Also in Schoolgirls' Picture Library #147.

== Pam's First Term at Mountain School ==
Published: 11 October 1952 to 9 May 1953

Pam Robins enrols in an exclusive private school among the mountains of picturesque Switzerland. However, as well as making chums she has to decipher the mystery of a letter her father sent her regarding 'The Sign of the Edelweiss'.

- Front cover strip. Also in Schoolgirls' Picture Library #75 as "Pam at Mountain School".

== Pat of the Dolphins ==
Published: 22 April 1961 to 3 February 1962
Artist: Robert MacGillivray

Pat Summers is a gifted swimmer and diver, and soon becomes world famous putting on shows with dolphins.

== Patsy's Circus Days ==
Published: 26 July 1952 to 14 February 1953

When Duval's Circus arrives in town, Patsy Leyland applies for a job - and soon finds out there are rum goings-on aplenty when it is targeted by the enigmatic Seventh Clown.

- Unusually for a British comic of the time, Patsy narrated the action "in her own words". Patsy Leland later returned in "Rivals of the Circus" (5 December 1953 to 5 June 1954) and "Mystery Member of the Circus" (c. 1954 to 1955). Also in Schoolgirls Picture Library #70 and #117, and Princess Picture Library #112.

== Penny's Strange Quest at Monkswood ==
Published: 25 October 1958 to 2 May 1959

Staying with her artist uncle, Penelope Tremlett soon gets drawn into peculiar goings-on at the local boys' school of Monkswood.

== Penny of Maywood Stables ==
Published: 6 August to 24 September 1960

After her uncle leaves her a riding stable on the south coast, Penny Lane is delighted - though the dilapidated Maywood Stables will need some work to be the place she has dreamed of all her life.

== Penny of Pine Ridge ==
Published: 9 December 1961 to 22 September 1962
Artist: Reginald Ben Davis

Penny West runs a small riding school in Pine Ridge, a countryside estate near Landale, but must balance training young jockeys against those who would ruin the idyllic area.

- Also in School Friend Picture Library #8.

== Pepita and Her Puppets ==
Published: c. June to 26 December 1959

Despite having a cruel stepmother, Italian village girl Pepita brings joy to the community with her puppet shows.

- Also in Schoolgirls' Picture Library #127. Later modified and reprinted as "Rosita and Her Puppets" in Poppet.

== Phantom Ballerina ==
Published: 19 December 1959 to 14 May 1960
Artist: Reginald Ben Davis

Shirley Wells opens a dance school with immediate success - until a sinister neighbour begins making a nuisance of himself. Shirley gets aid from an unlikely source - a spectral ballet dancer who appears in her school.

- Front cover strip. Translated into French and published in Filette by Société Parisienne d'Édition.

== Princess Anita ==
Published: 25 September 1954 to 5 March 1955; 10 September 1955 to 10 October 1964

Crown Princess Anita of Sylvanberg returns from boarding school after the death of her parents, only to find her uncle Arch-Duke Michael has eyes on making his regency permanent with the aid of Anita's cruel governess Countess Helga, finding an ally in peasant girl Gerda.

- After winning back her crown in the first serial "Anita, Princess in Disguise", Princess Anita returned for a long regular stint. Also in Schoolgirls' Picture Library #105, #123 and #174.

== Princess Lola ==
Published: 21 May to 24 September 1960; 11 March 1961 to c. 1963
Artist: Robert MacGillivray

Kind-hearted Princess Lola of San Sereno - known as 'the Gay Princess' for her sunny personality - goes to great lengths to help her subjects.

- The first serial was called "The Gay Princess", the second "Lola's Golden Quest".

== Princess Mischief ==
Published: 26 October 1963 to 7 March 1964

Belinda may be heiress to the throne of Ruvenia, but her boundless energy and sense of humour soon earn her the nickname 'Princess Mischief'.

== Prue's Pony ==
Published: 2 September to 28 October 1961

In 1900, Prue Pomfroy's posh family buys a motor car - but she is more interested in a foal she finds wandering the New Forest.

== The Rebel Princess ==
Published: 25 May to 31 August 1963

Count Radek hopes to depose Princess Gina of Rosania and install himself on the throne, but she escapes. Making friends with a peasant girl called Hansi and aided by the Masked Black Shadow, Gina sets about exposing Radek's treachery.

- Reprinted in June as "Princess Gina and the Black Shadow".

== The Rhymes of Merry Matilda ==
Published: 27 January 1951 to 12 January 1952
Artist: Basil Reynolds

- One-page humour strip, with rhyming text and great lashings of racism.

== The Riddle of Beacon Heights ==
Published: 9 July to 12 November 1955
Artist: Reginald Ben Davis

In 1754, Anne Bellew arrives to stay with her uncle at Beacon Heights, and soon begins he might be involved in piracy. Given that he is called Cap'n Jonas Darke, Anne may well be onto something.

- Later reprinted as "The Mystery of Beacon House" in June.

== The Riddle of the Ivory Mandarin ==
Published: 11 April to 29 August 1959
Artist: E.C. Julien

Touring Cornwall, Bob and Brenda Richmond receive an ivory figurine from their father Colin, a secret agent, and soon find a group led by the sinister Miss Soong will stop at nothing to get hold of it.

- Translated into French and published in Filette by Société Parisienne d'Édition.

== Rivals of the Alpine School ==
Published: 7 October 1950 to 12 May 1951

English girl Gwen Waring arrives at the beautiful Silver Lake School in Switzerland, but soon makes an enemy in the form of the unsporting Olga Lisette. Gwen must use her wits to win the skiing competition - aided by the gallant Masked Watcher.

- Front cover strip. Also in Schoolgirls' Picture Library #42.

== Romance at Their Alpine School ==
Published: 6 December 1958 to 20 June 1959

When White Towers School pupils Gwen Edwards and Zoe Burne find their mistress Maryon Sinclair's fiancé Paul Westerman has been framed as a coward and fired from his job as a mountain guide the pair resolve to clear his name.

- Front cover strip.

== Rozana - Schoolgirl of Mystery ==
Published: 3 August 1957 to 29 November 1958

Crossways School pupils Joy Ridley and Aileen Dexter are put in charge of greeting an exotic new pupil, Arabian noble Rozana. They soon find themselves inveigled in their new friend's complicated life.

- Front cover strip. The first serial (3 August 1957 to 1 February 1958) was named "That Amazing Schoolgirl from the East".

== Scamp ==
Published: 1962 to ?
Artist: Harry Hargreaves

The adventures of the good-natured dog Scamp, owned by a girl named Fay.

- The character of Scamp - whose stories were 'put into words for him' by Ida Melbourne - a pseudonym for L.E. Ransome - had previously appeared as text stories.

== Secret Enemy of the Pets Club ==
Published: 14 August to 13 November 1954

Josie Gray and Hazel Robins set up a pets club with their friends of Suncove School, only for local ne'er do well Spencer Carson to attempt to shut them down.

- Front cover strip.

== Secret Friends of the Sports Mistress ==
Published: 15 December 1951 to 4 October 1952

After their sports mistress Miss Dale is fired due to the machinations of spoilt prefect Imogen Kirby, Abbotsfield pupils Heather Croft and Kay Richards work together to undo the injustice.

- Front cover strip.

== Secret Rider from Highwood Hall ==
Published: 28 July to 22 December 1951
Artist: W. Bryce-Hamilton

In 1751 Prue Nightingale works for her kind mistress at Highwood Hall, but an encounter with the suave highwayman Captain Fortune involves her in the machinations of Jabez Starke, amoral leader of the Bow Street Runners.

- Also in Schoolgirls' Picture Library #54.

== Shelley of Showbusiness ==
Published: 26 May to 22 September 1962
Artist: Robert MacGillivray

Peggy Simon is forced to put her acting ambitions on pause and take a job working behind the scenes at a theatre after her family's fortunes take a turn for the worse. Her talent means she soon lands a role in the play, but one of her co-stars is less happy and attempts to sabotage her.

- Translated into French and published in Filette by Société Parisienne d'Édition.

== The Silent Three ==
Published: 20 May to 30 September 1950; 19 May to 8 December 1951; 16 May to 19 December 1953; 14 May 1955 to 26 November 1955; 24 November 1956 to 27 July 1957; 15 August 1959 to 12 December 1959; 17 September 1960 to c. 1961; 4 January 1964 to c. April 1964
Writers: Stewart Pride, Horace Boyton
Artist: Evelyn Flinders

Three schoolgirls at St. Kit's boarding school — Betty Roland, Joan Derwent and Peggy West — band together as a secret society against the tyranny of the head prefect.

- The characters debuted in 1950's "The Silent Three at St. Kits" before returning in 1951's "The Silent Three at Island School", 1953's "Secret Member of the Silent Three", 1955's "The Silent Three's Highland Quest", 1956-57's "The Silent Three in Switzerland", 1959's "The Silent Three at Clock House", 1960-61's "Spy Hunt for the Silent Three" and 1964's "The Silent Three and the Secret of the Singing Birds". Flinders retired in 1959. Also in Schoolgirls' Picture Library #58, #87, #120 and #300.

== Solak the Wolf Dog ==
Published: 29 December 1951 to 19 July 1952

After the nefarious Pierre Lacoste tricks the people of the remote Canadian settlement of Oster Creek into believing local wolfhound Solak is a violent threat, plucky Judy Denham works to keep the dog from cruel punishment.

- Also in Schoolgirls' Picture Library #57.

== Sparrows of Angel Street ==
Published: 29 September 1962 to 19 October 1963

Joy Sparrow's father runs a grocers shop on Angel Street, through which she gets involved in all manner of local to-dos.

- Also in School Friend Picture Library #31 and #35.

== Stars of the Circus ==
Published: 26 November 1960 to 22 April 1961

Susan Webster lands a job in the circus thanks to her friend, tightrope walker Julie Byrd. However, soon after she starts at the circus it looks like she is causing trouble.

- Translated into French and published in Filette by Société Parisienne d'Édition.

== Stone Age Kitty ==
Published: 5 October 1963 to 11 April 1964
Artist: Arthur Martin

Cavegirl Kitty shows off some of the quirks of prehistoric life.

- Half-page humour strip.

== Storm Manor ==
Published: 30 July to 24 September 1960

Norma Hollis goes to stay with her Uncle Marcus as his overgrown Storm Manor in Cornwall, and soon sees that there may be reasons behind the superstitious outlook of the locals.

== The Strangest Stories Ever Told ==
Published: 5 October 1963 to 23 January 1965
Writers: Scott Goodall, Len Wenn, Terry Magee
Artists: Mike Hubbard

The pipe-smoking Storyteller dispenses spooky stories.

- Continued in "June".

== Susan of the Ice Show ==
Published: 29 September 1956 to 30 November 1957
Artist: E.C. Julien

Talented ice skater Susan Webster gets her big break in a travelling ice show, but must discover the secret of the disruptive Masked Harlequin.

- Translated into French and published in Filette by Société Parisienne d'Édition.

== Sylvia and the Indian Idol ==
Published: 21 June to 9 August 1952

On holiday in India, Sylvia Somers visits her father in Bombay and soon finds herself caught up in an attempt to steal a mystical idol from his home.

== Terry Brent, Detective ==
Published: 23 May 1950 to 15 April 1961
Artist: Cecil Langley Doughty

Good-natured private detective Terry Brent helps people with minor problems. Later investigations saw Terry joined by his tomboy niece Paddy McNaught.

- Similar to "Bruce Kent" and "Zip Nolan", readers were encouraged to spot the solution to each strip's mystery before it was revealed. In an inversion of Zip Nolan, this was later dropped in favour of straightforward adventure stories.

== That Girl Patsy! ==
Published: 25 May 1963 to 22 February 1964
Writer: L.E. Ransome (as Ida Melbourne)

Mischievous schoolgirl Patsy is always up to something, frequently taking advantage of gullible prefect Herbert.

- Text story. Continued from Girls' Crystal

== Tracy ==
Published: 4 June 1960 to 22 September 1962?

Tracy Jones breaks through into modelling; later, she and the other girls from her agency are invited to exotic Abbia by the country's king, who hopes his female subjects will begin following Western fashions.

- Also in School Friend Picture Library #1, #3 and #9.

== Yasmin and the Golden Pyramid ==
Published: 1951 to ?

Living in Baghdad with her overbearing merchant uncle Haroun Bey, Yasmin leaps at the chance to act as a guide to English siblings Pat and Dave Hunter.
