= List of Girls' Crystal comic stories =

A list of stories in British weekly girls' comic Girls' Crystal, published between 1953 and 1963 by the Amalgamated Press and Fleetway Publications.

== The Aerial Castaways ==
Published: 13 May to 19 August 1961
Artist: Tom Kerr

After their plane crashes in the South American jungle, air hostess Linda Martin is left looking after children Peter and Jane Wesley as they try to make their way back to civilisation.

- Later reprinted in June 12 August to 7 October 1967.

== Allies of the Girl Stowaway ==
Published: 27 July 1957 to c. May 1958

On the way to their uncle's coffee plantation in South Africa, Pam and Dick Arnold are started to find a stowaway called Kay Stanton hidden on board the S.S. Adventure, who begs them to help her reach Madeira.

- Front cover strip.

== Amanda of the Curiosity Shop ==
Published: 18 May to 24 August 1957
Writer: Doreen Gray (Note: Possibly a pen name; the identities of many who wrote for comics of the period are still unknown.)

Amanda Westland works as an assistant at Mr. Caffray's Milchester curiosity shop, and encounters many interesting people running errands in Caffray's buggy, pulled by the pony Barnabas.

- Text story.

== Babs – Holiday Camp Hostess ==
Published: c. 1959
Writer: Doris Graveley (as Doris Graham)

After arriving at the Blue Bay holiday camp, the can-do spirit and charm of Babs Baker soon makes her one of the camp's most popular hostesses.

- Text story.

== Belle at the Green Room ==
Published: c. 1960 to 1961

Belle Vernon's Aunt Gaye runs The Green Room, a boarding house for theatre folk. However, many of their regular customers are being tempted away to the new Park View Guest House, and Belle desperately tries to find a way of saving her beloved aunt's livelihood.

== Betty of the Boathouse ==
Published: c. June 1956 to ?

With her father recovering from an accident, Betty Franklin takes over handling the family boatyard, which is frequently used by the nearby Riverside boys' school, and attempts to help pupils Don Weston and Vic Huntley prepare for the Cranesford Regatta. However, prefect Horace Skeen seems determined to sabotage their efforts.

== Binnie's Strange Seaside Quest ==
Published: 9 July to 22 October 1955

Binnie Milton goes on holiday to Cliffsea, encountering the pupils of Seamew Guest House – who have been receiving a series of unusual notes.

== Bridget All on Her Own in London ==
Published: c. 1958–59

Irish orphan Bridget O'Hara is invited to London to stay with a distant uncle, but when she arrives she finds he has been tricked by an usurper. Refusing to return to Ireland, she finds lodgings and a job as she tries to prove her true identity.

== Bruce the Circus Dog ==
Published: 21 March 1953 to 19 June 1954

Bruce and his faithful mistress Lena get tangled up in a kidnapping plot.

== Carol of the Circus ==
Published: 30 July to ? 1955, 21 April to 5 May 1956
Writer: Doreen Gray

Carol Meldrum is the star turn of her father's travelling circus.

- Text story.

== Cherry and the Children ==
Published: c. January – c. 1960 to 18 May 1963
Artist: John Armstrong

Cherry Bryant looks after siblings Sue and Tim – as well as Boxer the dog – while her mother works at a cigarette factory, keeping them all safe despite the quartet always getting into scrapes.

- Front cover strip. Later continued in School Friend and June. Also in Girls' Crystal Annual 1965.

== Cherry of Happydale Hotel ==
Published: c. August 1954 to 19 June 1954
Writer: Reginald G. Thomas (as Jane Preston)

Cherry Ashton gets a job as a receptionist at the Happydale Hotel in the Lake District, and soon finds out just how challenging guests can be.

- Text story.

== Cindy Out West ==
Published: 5 August to 14 October 1961
Writer: Jean Granger

Cindy Roberts moves to Canada and makes fast friends with neighbour Bobbie Braddon – and the pair soon cause good-natured chaos together.

- Text story.

== Claire of the Clarion ==
Published: 12 January to 6 April 1957; 23 November 1957 to 17 May 1958
Writer: Denise Kerry

Claire Martin lands a job as a junior reporter on the Buxby Clarion local newspaper and sets out to make her mark.

- Text story; renamed "Claire the Clarion Newsgetter" for the second set of stories.

== Copper – Mystery Horse ==
Published: 11 March to 6 May 1961
Artist: E.C. Julien

A pupil at Abbottswade Girls' School, Betty Woods would dearly love to have her own horse and spends her free time watching other girls ride. Her dream seems to come true when a wild horse appears on the grounds; naming him Copper, Betty sets about making him her own – despite her own lame leg.

== Daphne of Galleon Cove Camp ==
Published: 24 April to 19 June 1954

Bunty Rayner and Pat Simms are at a schoolgirl campsite near Galleon House in Cornwall when they find an amnesiac woman on the beach and offer her help. The only clue to her identity is a torn luggage label bearing the name 'Daphne Ronson'.

- Front cover strip.

== The Daring Dorlinis ==
Published: 11 March to 6 May 1961

Dianna Dorlini tours Europe as part of Vanda's Circus, performing a popular trapeze routine with her demanding Uncle Karl. At one show she receives a note from a boy called Paul which suggests there may be more to her life than she fought – though Karl is loathe for her to find a way out.

== Dinah and Her Mystery Horse ==
Published: ? to 30 May 1959

Tim Brent gifts the talented Dinah Hudson a horse called Flame; after much training the pair with the Texas Cup Race, only for Brent's uncle, Rancher Paulson, to claim that the horse was stolen from him.

== The Dog Which Surprised the Fourth ==
Published: 29 October to 3 December 1955

With her Uncle Bob called overseas unexpectedly, Sue Merton arranges to be allowed to take her beloved Alsatian Rory to school at St. Lynn's with her – to the delight of her fellow fourth formers and annoyance of sceptical teacher Miss Tate.

== Dream Ballerina ==
Published: 14 April to ? 1962

As four students at the Sunley School of Ballet – Candy Ansell, Sally Prentice, Toni Harrison and Judy Phillips – practice a new piece devised by head Madame Duval's nephew Andrew, Candy finds a mystery girl who seems to be a supremely gifted ballerina.

== Elizabeth in London ==
Published: 14 January to 18 February 1961
Writer: John W. Wheway (as Anne Gilmore)

Elizabeth Leabridge moves to London to take up the post of Assistant Junior Designer to Gilda Leverett, daughter of a famous fashion designer. Rooming at the Belwick Hostel, she makes fast friends with Mel Granger. However, her dream job is jeopardised when a misunderstanding makes it look like the pair are secretly working for Leverett's rival Karton.

- Text story.

== Ella and the Mississippi Showboat ==
Published: 29 October 1955 to 23 June 1956

In 19th century Louisiana, Ella O'Rourke returns home to Whitewoods Plantation from boarding school and quickly becomes fascinated with a travelling showboat – much to the displeasure of her wealthy guardian Sam Dawson. Instead, she stows away on board and disguises herself as 'Candy Rogers', finding help from Lee Phillips and Melody Matthews.

== The Fourth Form Treasure Seekers ==
Published: 22 June to 10 August 1957

Eastdale College Fourth Formers Shirley Price and Janet Blake receive a map that contains the location of the pirate Captain Flint's buried treasure and set out to find it – with unwanted help from the headteacher's nephew Colin Steerforth.

== Friend of the Tudor Outlaw ==
Published: 10 July to ? 1954

In 1586, village girl Alison Day is fishing with her brother Edwin when they find a leather flask marked with the monogram of noble Hugh Delorme, who has returned to the district in secret after a dispute with the wicked local squire, asking for her help.

== Friends of the Forest ==
Published: 20 May to 29 July 1961
Writer: Judy Martin

Tracy Paterson befriends native Canadian girl Wildflower, though both of the girls' fathers are less than happy with the new friendship.

- Text story. It is not addressed whether Wildflower is the same character as that featured in "Wildflower of the Rockies".

== Friends of the Gipsy Skater ==
Published: c. December 1953 to 17 April 1954

Arriving for a skiing holiday in Switzerland, Carol Fenton and Denia Grey find themselves helping gipsy girl Mitzi get away from her cruel guardian Scarpio – with their efforts complicated by the actions of the girls' rival Rhoda Beverley.

- Front cover strip.

== Friends of the Skating Star ==
Published: 27 August 1955 to 28 April 1956

Aspiring ice skaters Janet Leeds and Jo Spence are granted an audition by the famous Irissa Dawn, star of the Ice Cabaret at the Kingswood Theatre, only to find out their heroine is accused of being the notorious Girl in the Crimson Mask.

== The Gay Adventurers ==
Published: c. Summer/Autumn 1956; 5 January to 7 December 1957
Writer: J. E. McKibbin (as Elise Probyn)

Sally and Dave Rover go on a walking holiday to Europe and stumble across many peculiar happenings.

- Text story, initially named "Sally and Dave – The Gay Adventurers". Also in Girls' Crystal Annual 1959.

== Gaye the Autograph-Hunter ==
Published: 8 May to 19 June 1954
Writer: J. E. McKibbin (as Janet McKibbin)

Gaye Briscoe goes to great lengths to get the autographs of her idols.

- Text story. Also in Girls' Crystal Annual 1956 and 1957; the latter was a picture strip.

== Ghost Village ==
Published: 14 April to 25 August 1962

After getting lost on a cycling holiday on the moors of the West Country, Billie Fenton and Wanda Raines follow signs to a village called Lamarr and find that it is deserted, and seemingly been abandoned five years earlier. The pair decide to investigate.

== Gilda and the Golden Eagle ==
Published: 2 January to 24 April 1954
Artist: Robert MacGillivray

Gilda Scott and Fay Finchley receive an invite to an old classmate's hacienda in Santa Veraz, Mexico but get drawn into a web of mystery when Gilda accepts a badge bearing a golden eagle from a friendly boy.

== Gillian – The Girl Travel Guide ==
Published: 27 August to 19 November 1955
Writer: Reginald G. Thomas (as Jane Preston)

Gillian Taylor trots the globe working as a guide for the famous Cassada Travel Agency.

- Text story.

== The Girls Who Ran the Ferry ==
Published: 5 April to ? 1958

Sisters Lynne and Joy West receive a request from their friend Jenny Brent to help run her father's Ferry Boathouse in the Norfolk Broads, and find it is losing customers to the rival business ran by Mr. Hardwicke and his frightful daughter Sylvia. To make matters worse, Mr. Brent is hospitalised following a mishap, leaving the three girls to try and turn things around alone.

== The Golden Pagoda ==
Published: 10 March to 16 June 1962
Writer: John W. Wheway (as Hazel Armitage)

Eve and Brian Kenton travel from Hong Kong to visit their father's friend, Chinese doctor Fo Lin Sun, near the river Fen Poo. However, on arrival they find the doctor acting strangely, and find a strange message thrown from a locked pagoda in his home.

- Originally printed in School Friend 20 May to 15 July 1950. Also in Schoolgirls' Picture Library No. 6 as "Prisoner of the Pagoda".

== Greta and the Golden Guitar ==
Published: 17 September 1960 to 14 January 1961
Artist: A.E. Allen

Talented musician and singer Greta dreams of using her talent to escape life with her harsh stepfather.

- Translated into French and published in Filette by Société Parisienne d'Édition.

== Greta the Boathouse Girl ==
Published: 31 August to 16 November 1957
Writer: Denise Kerry

Greta Delane travels the canals of the Norfolk Broads on board the cabin cruiser Wild Goose with her younger sister Poppy.

- Text story.

== Happy Go Lucky Friends ==
Published: 24 June to 8 October 1960
Artist: Robert MacGillivray

A group of friends found the Company of Smiles and plan to renovate an old theatre to put on shows for the townspeople, but find someone wants to stop them from succeeding.

- Translated into French and published in Filette by Société Parisienne d'Édition.

== Hazel in the Highlands ==
Published: 24 May to ? 1958
Writer: Denise Kerry

Hazel Hall travels to Scotland to work for her uncle Hamish Mackenzie, who owns a farm in Glencorrachie, and soon proves to be an admirable source of help.

- Text story. Also in Girls' Crystal Annual 1960 as a picture strip.

== Her Highness Learns to Dance ==
Published: 15 April to 5 August 1961

Young dancer Elsa Hanzel is asked to act as a double for Princess Sylvia of Florenberg while she undertakes a diplomatic mission. Elsa must learn the ways of the Florenberg court, while Sylvia has to become proficient enough at ballet to pass as a member of Elsa's touring company.

== Hetty & Hal in Holland ==
Published: ? 1953 to 19 June 1954
Writer: J. E. McKibbin (as Elise Probyn)

Hetty Walker and her brother Hal visit the Netherlands, and soon get mixed up in several bizarre escapades.

- Text story.

== Her Strange Quest in the Ballet ==
Published: 22 June 1958 to 29 March 1959

Young ballerina Anne slips off a cliff and loses her memory, and must piece things together to pass a once-in-a-lifetime chance to audition for the Montesa Ballet Company.

== High Trapeze ==
Published: 14 April to 16 June 1962

After Wyn Kenyon's parents die she emigrates to America with her dog Lenny in the hope of them both getting accepted as acts at Hyram Heston's famed Triple Crown Circus.

== Holiday in Venice ==
Published: 3 June to 8 August 1961
Artist: Pierre Brochard

Visiting Venice for Carnival Week, Jill Groves helps local girl Anna Faroli after her father is framed by a rival.

- Originally printed in French in Juanita as "Séjour à Venise".

== The Horse They Had to Hide ==
Published: 4 January to 22 February 1958

The Fourth Form of the East Coast Fenland School persuade their head to allow them to organise a gymkhana for charity. Julie Grant and Wynne Norris arrange for local circus performer Brenda Dale's horse Prince to do tricks at the events, but then receive strange instructions to hide Prince on the grounds.

== The House of Secrets ==
Published: 25 January to 14 June 1958

Orphans Dot and Shirley Carfax are released from school to visit Hawkbay on the north-east coast, where a letter from their late grandmother tells them a Cavalier's cloak buried in the ruins of Cliff House will give them great happiness.

== I Want to Be a Nurse! ==
Published: c. 1960 to 29 December 1962

Anne Arnold is a student nurse at St. Audrey's Hospital in Porchester, and hopes to get a full posting on the children's ward there.

- Moved to the front cover from 23 December 1961.

== The Invisible Japer ==
Published: c. May to 5 July 1958

St Jude's School's Fourth Form are meant to be preparing a romantic tableau but things keep going missing. Blame soon falls on form joker Prue Tucker, but she insists she is not responsible and as things escalate the other girls begin to believe her.

== Jackie of the Circus ==
Published: c. Autumn 1958

Young office assistant Jackie Scott solves all manner of problems around the circus.

== Jane's Pupil, the Prince ==
Published: 16 December 1961 to 3 March 1962

Jane Reynolds is hired as governess to Prince Hussein of Kohpala, but soon finds there are those in the palace who want the boy out of the way.

== The Japer Who Amazed the School ==
Published: 3 April to 8 May 1954

Inveterate prankster Paddy Hall is framed as a thief by a fellow Meadowvale School Pupil; she and her sidekick Jill Desmond strive to prove her innocence.

== Jill, Belinda and the Gipsy Jigsaw ==
Published: 3 August 1957 to 11 January 1958

Jill and Belinda Martin holiday with their Aunt Lily, who runs a teashop. After bullied customer Fay Barham leaves a mysterious note about an important gipsy jigsaw puzzle, the pair resolve to find it for the girl.

== Jo's Seaside Adventure ==
Published: 30 January to 3 July 1954

In the late 19th century, Jo Stokes travels to the coast to visit her Aunt Ella. Leaving Victoria station she is given a fan by a young man named Peter Lakin, and is astonished to find it features an exact painting of Ella's home Westwinds on it.

- Later reprinted in Poppet 13 June to 11 July 1964.

== Judy – The Girl of 100 Jobs ==
Published: ? to 23 July 1955
Writer: Stanley E. Austin (as Sheila Austin)

Judy Bennett takes a post at a temping agency and throws herself into myriad jobs with enthusiasm.

- Text story.

== Judy of Moose Park ==
Published: 21 June to ? 1958

An illness allows orphan Judy Lee to escape her heartless foster-parents and recuperate in Moose Park in the Canadian Rockies. Desperate to live there forever, she befriends native girl Grey Owl, who offers to train her so she can work as a junior guide in the park.

- After Judy landed the job, the strip was retitled "Judy of the Rockies".

== Judy the Rebel ==
Published: ? to 4 March 1961

Arriving at Green Towers School, Judy Fremont rapidly comes to suspect despotic headmistress Miss Price is hiding crimes behind her veil of cruelty, and begins working out what she and her classmates can do to bring her to justice.

== Julie's Adventures in Wartime France ==
Published: 20 June 1959 to ?

In 1939, Julie Hargreaves suffers a climbing accident in Switzerland and is unable to return to Britain with her brother Alec. Instead after recovering she travels to France and gets a job in Madame Garonde's pastry shop as she tries to work out a way to get back to England.

== June and the Jungle Boy ==
Published: c. September 1955 to 11 February 1956

With her Uncle John and the guide Simon Carter, June Carmody heads to Africa to find a mysterious idol left to her by her father. There she meets the curious jungle boy Zarno, whose companion cheetah Banu bears her father's picture on a locket around his neck, and tries to decode the mystery of the Valley of the Five Moons.

== Karen and the Boy Prince ==
Published: 1 May to 24 July 1954

In the small, quaint European state of Kalonia, Karen Linzel has been left running her mother's dress shop ahead of a costume ball – and ends up catching the attention of the dashing Prince Stefan.

== Kathy – The Camera Girl ==
Published: 26 November 1955 to ?
Writer: J. E. McKibbin (as Elise Probyn)

With her brother Bob out of action with a leg injury, Kathy Jessop takes over as photographer for his business.

- Text story.

== Kit of Sundown Ranch ==
Published: 20 February to 1 May 1954
Writer: Stanley E. Austin (as Sheila Austin)

Kit Westley and her trusty horse Blaze have adventures at Sundown Ranch in Arizona.

- Text story.

== Kit on Secret Service ==
Published: 14 January to 8 April 1961

Having been educated at the Chateau Neuve in France, Kit Grey is sent there when the country is occupied by Germany in order to find secret documents kept in the building, which has been requisitioned as a Nazi HQ.

== Kitty and Kay in Switzerland ==
Published: c. 1955
Writer: J. E. McKibbin (as Elise Probyn)

Kitty Martin and her cousin Kay go on a holiday to the snowy slopes of Switzerland.

- Text story.

== Linda and Madge on Crusoe Island ==
Published: 18 January 1958 to 10 January 1959
Artist: Rodney Sutton

Linda Mudie and Madge Carr plan a highly unusual summer holiday – Linda's botanist Uncle Charles uses his lugger to drop the pair off on an uninhabited island off Borneo where they will live for a month. Shortly after they are dropped off, the adventurous pair discover an amulet and footprints which suggest the island might not be as uninhabited as they thought – and they soon meet an island girl called Tapita, who has a pet monkey called Rikki.

- From 12 July 1958 the story was renamed "The Crusoe Girls' Pacific Quest". Translated into French and published in Filette by Société Parisienne d'Édition.

== Linda of Lantern House ==
Published: 28 October to 9 December 1961

Arriving at Lantern House in Deepdale Hollow to live with her guardian Jacob Mall, Linda Barry soon finds there are a number of unusual characters living nearby.

- Also in Girls' Crystal Annual 1969.

== Lost Memory Girl ==
Published: 15 October 1960 to 25 February 1961
Artist: Pierre Brochard

Tina Camponi loses her memory and finds herself in the middle of a kidnapping plot orchestrated by her guardian Carlo Borotti without knowing why,

- Originally printed in the French comic Cathy Spécial as "Cœur de Naples".

== Loyal to the Christmas Exile ==
Published: 30 November to 28 December 1957

Spending Christmas at Glenmoor School, Jo Farnley and Susan Holt play host to girls from other nearby schools but Glenmoor's Fourth Form Captain Audrey Lester is sent away in curious circumstances. Jo and Susan believe she is innocent, and try to help clear her name.

== Loyal to the Sports Mistress ==
Published: 20 February to 27 March 1954

Thanks to the expert coaching of Miss Norma Delane, Riverside School pupils Gwynne Duncan and Terry Milne are accepted into a prestigious rowing competition; however, the pair's rivals Sybil and Janice begin to meddle and throw doubt on Miss Delane's character.

== Loyal to the Young Film Star ==
Published: 6 October to 1 December 1956

Cinema starlet Diana Deane's latest picture is filming at Sherwood School – to the delight of fourth form captain and Diana Deane Fan Club founder Belle Harman and her friend Julie. They find the actress is receiving odd messages, and begin to suspect school trouble-maker Esme has something to do with the odd business.

== Lucy of Dolphin Manor ==
Published: 21 April to 17 November 1956

In 1805, Lucy Norton is staying with her father at Dolphin Manor on the Kent coast during the war between England and France when the suspicious Cynthia Radcliffe arrives as a guest.

== Lucy's Perilous Mission ==
Published: ? 1953 to 23 January 1954
Artist: Robert MacGillivray

After Lucy Blake's father Sir Anthony is falsely charged by his enemy Sir Robert Varley she believes evidence to clear him has been hidden in foreboding Sedgeby Castle, and sets out to find it.

== Lynette in London ==
Published: 24 November 1956 to 11 May 1957
Writer: Christine Landon

Lynette Hargreaves arrives in London to enrol in the School of Art.

- Text story.

== The Make-Believe Princess ==
Published: 28 May 1955 to 11 February 1956

Growing up in England but born in the small Alpine state of Marovia, orphaned Deanna Stanley is invited to visit the country of her birth by Countess Valetta – and finds out that her strong resemblance to Princess Zena threatens to make her a pawn in someone's scheme.

== Mam'selle X ==
Published: c. October 1961 to 18 May 1963

Actress Avril Claire is not popular in Occupied France, as she performs for the German troops. But what nobody knows is that she is in fact Mam'selle X, a member of the French Resistance.

- Continued in School Friend, June and Tammy. Also in Girls' Crystal Annual 1965, 1968 to 1969 and 1975.

== Maureen on Lonely Island ==
Published: 3 January to 13 June 1959

Living on an island in Scotland, Maureen has been unknowingly left a treasure by her late grandfather, and her selfish guardian tries to find the secret without her finding out.

- Translated into French and published in Filette by Société Parisienne d'Édition.

== Maypole at School ==
Published: 9 December 1961 to 7 April 1962

At six foot tall, May Carew towers over her fellow Third Formers at Rushmere Grange, and fast develops a reputation as a livewire.

- Moved to the front cover c. 1962. Also in Girls' Crystal Annual 1965 and 1973.

== Merle's Voyage of Mystery ==
Published: 21 March to ? 1953

Crossing the Mediterranean on the S.S. Dorian, Merle Wason and her friend Joan Kerr become suspicious of the activities of aloof fellow passengers Mr. Gregg and his daughter Celia.

- Front cover strip. Also in Schoolgirls' Picture Library No. 132.

== Merril and the Wild Horse of the Moors ==
Published: 25 September 1954 to ?

Merril Dane of Greymoor School sees a chance for her team to win the Silver Cup when she meets a magnificent wild horse – though spoilt Norma Wade wants to make sure she is the star turn instead, and aims to stop Merril.

- Later reprinted in June 11 April to 16 May 1964.

== Mitzi of the Alps ==
Published: c. 1961

German village girl Mitzi works at Hoffman's Winter Sports Hotel, where she tries to teach tourists to respect the potentially dangerous Alpine slopes.

== Moira and the Masked Rider ==
Published: 18 February 1956 to ?

After inheriting the Oakwood Riding Stables from her uncle, Moira Dane must contend with local rival Janice Wade's attempts to shut down her riding school. Thankfully help is at hand from the enigmatic Masked Rider.

== Molly ==
Published: 21 March to ? 1953; 26 June 1954 to ?
Writer: Doris Graveley (as Doris Graham)

Acting as secretary to her novelist aunt Eva Barlow, Molly visiting many exotic locales.

- Text story. The 1953 story was set in Morocco; the 1954 return in Venice.

== Molly and the Phantom Circle ==
Published: 1 March to 26 April 1958

Molly Lawton is a new pupil at Oldabbey school, and is swiftly befriended by Diana Shane, the Fourth Form Captain. Exploring her new school, she stumbles across a secret society known as the Phantom Circle. The latter appear to steal a valuable Chinese Mandarin figurine, but Molly believes prefect Helen might be the real culprit.

- The Phantom Circle returned in 1959 – with Molly added to their membership – in "For the Honour of the Phantom Circle", and in the Girls' Crystal Annual 1960 to 1960.

== Molly's Christmas of Surprises ==
Published: 8 December 1956 to 5 January 1957
Artist: Bernard Greenbaum

Facing Christmas alone at Highmeads School, orphan Molly Stokes gets an unexpected invitation to join the Desmonds at their Devon home for the holidays. She soon discovers that the housekeeper Mrs. Green is keeping secrets from the kindly Desmonds with the aid of her niece Nina.

- Translated into French and published in Filette by Société Parisienne d'Édition.

== Mystery at Beacon College ==
Published: 30 June 1956 to 5 January 1957

Sisters Pat and Sue Marshall set out to find the secret of Cap'n Nathan, which seems to involve Porpoise Isle near their home at Beacon Cottage. A young local fisherman, Jim Binns, offers to help – though the pair aren't certain his intentions are pure.

== The Mystery Ballerina ==
Published: 20 February to 5 June 1954
Artist: John Armstrong

Babs Winston is a young member of the New Theatre's ballet company in Southquay, where her ambitions are supported by leading light Sandra Marsh. However, Sandra is targeted by jealous rival Olga – leaving Babs determined to help her idol.

- Translated into French and published in Filette by Société Parisienne d'Édition.

== Mystery Girl of the Nile ==
Published: ? to 19 November 1955

Visiting Egypt with her school, Sandra Drake meets a local girl called Yasmin with an identical brooch which may unlock happiness for the girl – as long as Sandra and her friend Beryl Gregg can avoid the wrath of petty prefect Grace Lang.

- Front cover strip.

== Mystery Mill ==
Published: 26 August to 21 October 1961
Artist: Robert MacGillivray

On holiday in the Netherlands, Vicky Drake becomes involved with Hans Bollen, whose father has been accused of stealing artworks.

- Translated into French and published in Filette by Société Parisienne d'Édition.

== Naida of the Jungle ==
Published: 21 March to ? 1953

Raised in the jungle by natives, English girl Naida takes her pet monkey Chikka on a journey to Thunder Falls. After her canoe sinks in a storm, she is befriended by Jean Stirling, niece of a professor travelling on a riverboat – and instantly makes an enemy of the cunning Gloria Marsden.

- Naida had previously appeared in Girls' Crystal when it was a story paper in the 1940s, written by Ronald Fleming under his 'Rhona Fleming' pseudonym.

== Noel Raymond – Detective ==
Published: 12 August to 2 December 1961

Roving detective Noel Raymond helps out damsels in distress with his crime-solving skills.

- Noel Raymond had appeared in the story paper version of Girls' Crystal between 1935 and 1951, where his adventures were written by Ronald Fleming. Also in Girls' Crystal Annual 1971.

== Not-So-Simple Susie ==
Published: 21 March 1953 to 19 June 1954
Artist: Cecil Orr

While schoolgirl Susie appears to be a clueless halfwit, anyone trying to trick her soon finds her dizzy behaviour masks a fierce intellect.

- Also in Girls' Crystal Annual 1955 to 1958.

== Nutmeg the Monkey ==
Published: ? to 11 February 1961

After an organ grinder's monkey escapes and moves into the Brown household, children John and Mary beg their parents to be allowed to keep it. Their parents believe Nutmeg should be returned to his owner, who the children realise is a cruel and greedy master, and set about trying to thwart them.

== Pam at Denehurst ==
Published: 12 August to 7 October 1961

Working-class girl Pam Hanley earns a scholarship to the renowned Denehurst school, and soon makes friends and impresses her teachers – much to the fury of snooty rival Nora Forbes.

== Pam of the South Seas ==
Published: 31 July 1954 to ?

Pam Bentley is making a supply run to Maheeti in her father's lugger when a girl named Deanna King risks shark-infested waters to deliver her a letter – which is immediately snatched from her but a mystery thief.

== Pat's Tyrolean Pen-Friend ==
Published: c. May to ? 1958

Pat Hunter is delighted when her school sends a party to Kitzsee in the Austrian Tyrol, as her penpal Marta lives nearby. She and her friend Sandra Clynes plan to sneak to Insbruck to meet up with Marta, but receive a strange warning from the girl when they arrive at their hotel asking for secrecy – something made difficult by the attentions of prefect 'Bossy' Bessie.

- Front cover strip.

== Peggy at the Rajah's Palace ==
Published: 8 December 1956 to 7 September 1957

The Rajah of Kohpala in invites his friend's daughter Peggy Drew to India so she can teach his niece Irissa, but soon finds herself targeted by nefarious palace staff.

== Peggy of the Golden West ==
Published: c. 1959

Living in the Old West, Peggy Wayne finds herself caught up in the schemes of Ezra Rogers, who wants to take control of her employer Mr. Carson's land in California after he strikes gold.

== Penny – The "Can-I-Help-You?" Girl ==
Published: 22 March to ? 1958
Writer: Eileen Meadows

Penny Dale signs up with her uncle's temping agency Can We Help You? and gets stuck in to many jobs with gusto.

- Text story.

== The Rebels of Island Castle ==
Published: 5 January to 20 July 1957

Holidaying for the summer, Jill MacDare and her brother Bruce head to their family's small castle off the coast of Scotland to find their old clan rivals the Garth family, who have produced documents that seem to prove the family home belongs to them. Drawing inspiration from her antecedent Lady Rhona, Jill resolves to discover the truth about the castle.

- Front cover strip.

== The Return of the Hooded Helpers ==
Published: 14 January to 14 April 1956

Castle School fourth formers Wyn Lester, Jenny Marsh and Gilda Wray celebrate Gilda's appointment as sports captain, but the head's secretary Yolani has the honour rescinded over a mess left in the school pavilion. Believing there is something going on involving Yolani's young sister Sophie, the trio don robes and resurrect their secret society of the Hooded Helpers to get to the bottom of things.

== The Richest Girl in the World ==
Published: 18 February to 15 July 1961

Living with her Aunt Ethel in a terraced house, Gaye Johnson's life changes overnight when American multi-millionaire G.J. Maloney – a distant relative – dies and leaves her his massive fortune and commercial empire – which includes oilfields, a chain of department stores, fashion-houses, airlines and a charity foundation.

== Rivals for the Flame Orchid ==
Published: 5 May to 20 October 1956

Benita Lagonda works as a florist at her Uncle Juan's florist shop in Santos, Mexico and hopes to earn the money for dancing lessons by finding the rare Flame Orchid – but soon finds she is not the only one searching for it.

== Sally's Island Adventure ==
Published: ? to 20 August 1955

Sally Drummond heads to isolated Clarig Island, owned by the kindly Mrs. Shone, to visit her secretary sister Jean. On arrival she finds Jean has vanished, leaving a letter which suggests Mason the butler and his daughter may be up to something.

== The Scholarship Girl Who Vanished ==
Published: 27 April to 15 June 1957

Jean Woodley lands a scholarship at Warden Towers School but disappears soon after arrival along with the school's prized hockey trophy. However, Carol Fane and Val Staines believe Jean is innocent, and that substitute form teacher Miss Grant is behind the disappearances instead.

== The Schoolgirl Ballet Dancers ==
Published: 21 April to ? 1956

Wencombe School's fourth formers are invited to the prestigious Manor Hall Academy to train under the famous Madame Duprez for an upcoming ballet festival. Captain Daphne Summers and her pal Wendy Hope must balance their practice with their efforts to clear their name of pen-friend Renee Fleur, dismissed beforehand after an accusation of theft.

- Also in Girls' Crystal Annual 1958.

== The Schoolgirl Campers ==
Published: 2 July to 27 August 1955

The fourth form of St. Hilary's School camp out on the moors ready for a gala and sports contest at nearby Torbrook Manor, where Brenda Carr and her friend Dinah Soames hope to enter a team – only for their preparations to be interrupted by a hooded stranger, and grumpy landowner Major Kenlow.

== Schoolgirl Helpers at Holiday Farm ==
Published: c. August/September to ? 1958

Valerie Carson and Raye Fowler are part of a group of girls staying at a farm in Somerset when they meet a boy called Steve Abbott searching for a bag, something he is trying to keep secret from his harsh guardian Mr. Marley. The pair resolve to help the unfortunate lad out.

== The Secret at Holiday Camp School ==
Published: 17 August to 5 October 1957
Writer: Denise Kerry

Holidaying at camp with their school, Renee Hope and Joy Lewis decide to help local invalid Heather Trelawny find a secret left to her by her grandfather.

== Secret Enemy of the Fourth Form Magazine ==
Published: 16 January to 13 February 1954

Julie Norton wants to be an "editress" and is given the chance to launch magazine for the Fourth Form at Elm Court. Her friends Betsy Marlow and Claire Kingsley eagerly help her put together The Fourth Form Gazette, but they begin receiving threatening letters from someone calling themselves 'The Green Jester'.

== The Secret of Bear Glacier ==
Published: 26 November 1955 to 2 June 1956

Anne Fraser and her best friend Paddy Clayton arrive in the Alps for a winter sports holiday, but soon find themselves dealing with a coded message telling them of the Great Bear at the sign of the Alpenhorn.

- Front cover strip.

== Sheila Grant – Girl Reporter ==
Published: 6 June to 29 September 1959, 24 June 1961 to 27 January 1962
Artist: Rodney Sutton

Sheila Grant is a young reporter at the Benford Evening Gazette who has a habit of getting caught up in plots due to her investigative approach to journalism.

- Sheila Grant first appeared in 1959's "Sheila and the Masked Swimmer" before returning in "Sheila Grant – Girl Reporter" in 1961. Translated into French and published in Filette by Société Parisienne d'Édition.

== Sheila at the Winter Sports ==
Published: 14 December 1957 to 15 March 1958
Writer: Rosemary Sutton

Sheila Berkeley starts her dream job as a Winter Sports Hostess at the Bellemontagne resort in Switzerland.

- Text story.

== Shirley of the Hat Shop ==
Published: 12 May to ? 1956
Writer: Wilfred McNeilly (as Mary Moore)

Newly employed at Chez Louise – a milliner's in Crantown – by Madame Louise Aubuson, Shirley Gill deals with all manner of customers.

- Text story.

== Shirley's Detective Schooldays ==
Published: ? 1953 to 13 February 1954

The great detective Rex Graham needs a way to investigate school governor Mr. Barclay, who he believes is a cover identity for criminal mastermind the Grey Kestrel. In order to find out the truth, his niece Shirley Drake volunteers to go undercover as pupil Anne Mason.

== The Song of the Rock ==
Published: 3 February to 19 May 1962

Jessica and Michael Daubenay join their parents in the Red House in Jersey in 1793, and soon become inveigled in a hunt for the lost family jewels.

== The Skating Coach's Amazing Secret ==
Published: c. Summer/Autumn 1956 to 1 June 1957

Arriving in Switzerland hoping to qualify for the Schoolgirl Skaters' International, Cherry Oakleigh and Fay Brook are delighted to find they will be coached by the great Gail Longden. However, they soon find out someone is out to wreck their chances, and Gail's reputation to boot.

== Sonia and the Mystery Boy ==
Published: 8 June 1957 to 11 January 1958

Peasant girl Sonia lives a tough life in a village in Laravia, looked after by cruel foster-parents but all that changes when a dashing rider called Igor passes, and recognises a crest she has on a brooch left to Sonia by her real parents.

== Star the Sheepdog ==
Published: 27 October 1956 to 23 December 1961

Meg Bell has trained Fellside Farm's sheep dog Star to carry out numerous clever and helpful tasks.

- Also in Girls' Crystal Annual 1958 and 1961.

== Sue – Skater with a Secret ==
Published: c. Autumn 1958

Sue Wilson wants to be a skater in an ice show, but local rink owner Mr. Foden believes her father robbed him. Using the false name of Sue Gaye she impresses in the audition and wins the part, but prim rival Merle Dawson suspects she is hiding something.

== Swiss Adventure ==
Published: 27 January to 7 April 1962

Sarah Desmond hopes to emulate her mother by winning the winter sports Kleine Trophy but her preparations are disrupted when her money is stolen shortly after she arrives in Switzerland. However, she finds help from a stranger known only as Fraulein, who is determined to help her succeed.

== Terry's Forbidden Circus Friend ==
Published: 24 November 1956 to 15 June 1957

A skilled juggler, Terry Lang hopes to gain a position at Marc Johnson's travelling circus after receiving a mysterious letter from a girl named Bonni letting her know of the position. However, it soon becomes clear it is not just her skill at tricks that is needed.

== Tess of the Tuck-shop ==
Published: ? to 25 June 1955; 12 July to ? 1958

Tess Channing helps her Aunt Mary run a tuck shop at Abbeyford School for Boys, and soon develops a dislike for mean prefect Vernon Paget, deciding to do what she can to thwart his schemes.

- The story was renamed "Tess and the New Master" for the 1958 serial.

== Tessa – She's a Tomboy ==
Published: 14 April 1962

Tessa's game antics often see her in scrapes but fail to dampen her spirit.

- Front cover strip. Also in Girls' Crystal Annual 1964.

== Tessa and the Boy Photographers ==
Published: 16 March to 20 April 1957

Tessa Channing and two boys from her school enter a local newspaper's photography competition, but their decision to use statues at an abandoned mansion for their subjects sees them drawn in by the old house's secrets.

- Translated into French and published in Filette by Société Parisienne d'Édition.

== That Exciting Holiday on the Broads ==
Published: ? to 2 July 1955

Pat Fraser holidays on the Norfolk Broads with her friend Valerie and her brother Tony when they discover a shoe with a message for help, and begin to investigate a mysterious yacht owned by the sinister Mr. Taylor.

== That Girl Patsy! ==
Published: 6 May 1961 to 18 May 1963
Writer: L.E. Ransome (as Ida Melbourne)

Mischievous schoolgirl Patsy is always up to something, frequently taking advantage of gullible prefect Herbert.

- Text story. Continued in School Friend. Also in Girls' Crystal Annual 1964.

== That Moroccan Birthday of Surprises ==
Published: 12 June to ? 1954

Wendy and Dick Durlston visit Telfa in Morocco as guests of their father's friend, the merchant Youssef el Hamid, and his daughter Narina. However, on a trip into town they become suspicious of a girl called Zala.

== That Thrilling Christmas at Crossways ==
Published: 10 December 1955 to 7 January 1956

Berry Hope spends Christmas with her Uncle Alan and Aunt Lucy at their country house Crossways, taking best friend Raye Turner along as a guest, but the arrival of two other visitors – Mr. Varden and his daughter Thelma – adds mystery to the seasonal celebrations.

== Their Farmhouse Christmas of Mystery ==
Published: ? 1953 to 9 January 1954

Visiting her Uncle Jeff and Aunt Mary at Oakwood Farm, Valerie Craig and her chum Linda Mallory are surprised when Una Wallace, a distant cousin from Australia, appears at the same time. The pair quickly realise that the guest is an imposter, and try to find out what has happened to the real Una.

== Their Feud at the Holiday Farm ==
Published: 26 June to 31 July 1954

A class of pupils from St. Gwen's School make a working visit to help with the harvest at Glenmead Farm, but Sheila Barton and Trudy Holt soon find themselves targeted by a sinister troublemaker.

- Later reprinted in Poppet 23 March to 18 April 1964.

== Their Feud with the Phantom Watcher ==
Published: 12 January to 2 March 1957

Deanfield School is gripped by election fever as the pupils prepare to select their representative at the Commonwealth Schoolgirls' Forum in Canada. Favourite Marilyn Hope has the support of Kit Howard and Susy Mayne, but their campaign suffers a setback due to the interference of the meddling Phantom Watcher.

== Their Strange Task in Venice ==
Published: 9 June to 29 December 1956

Staying with their Aunt Martha in Venice, Joy Mayer and her cousin Linda are shopping when an Italian girl gives them a strange package – which is promptly stolen from them. The pair decide to find out what exactly is going on.

- Front cover strip.

== Their Wartime Task ==
Published: 5 April to ? 1958

English-born Trudy, her sister Brita and brother Eric are holidaying in Norway with their uncle in 1940 when Nazi Germany invades. Separated from their uncle, they find a rowing boat and decide to make their way back to England and freedom.

== Thelma's Exciting First Term ==
Published: 15 May to 19 June 1954

Thelma Merton enrols at the beautiful St. Claire's school near Rokeley, and makes fast friends with junior sports captain Tess Farnfield, but her idyllic start is complicated by the arrival of her cousin Lynne, seemingly hiding from something.

== The Threat to Their Puppet Show ==
Published: 12 October to 23 November 1957

Judy Peters enters Danemead School's Fourth Form Puppet Group in the esteemed Gibson Content, only for cruel prefect Vera Vane. Judy and her friend Wendy Walters arrange to borrow a set owned by German school maid Elsa, but Vera continues to try and scupper their plans.

== The Tour of the Gipsy Caravan ==
Published: c. Summer/Autumn to 17 November 1956
Writer: Doreen Gray

Jill Thorne and Ann Perry holiday in a horse-drawn Gipsy caravan.

- Text story.

== Trixie's Diary ==
Published: 21 March 1953 to 29 April 1961
Writer: L.E. Ransome (as Ida Melbourne)

Schoolgirl Trixie keeps a diary of her escapades.

- Text story. Also featured in Girls' Crystal Annual 1955, 1956, 1957, 1958, 59, 60

Schoolgirls' Own Library No. 229 and No. 250.

== The Trouble-Maker of Study Six ==
Published: c. September to ? 1955

Una Carson and Jane Ferris are excited by the arrival of new girl Irene Holt from Canada. However, the newcomer's odd behaviour makes Una believe she is an imposter, and her attempts to find the truth see her branded a bully.

== The TV Quiz Girls ==
Published: 12 January to 27 July 1957

Celia Dale and Babs Turner win a bus tour of the Netherlands as a prize in a television quiz show but things are soon complicated by the mysterious behaviour of one of the staff members.

== Val – The Girl Who Helped Mr. Nemo ==
Published: 21 March to ? 1953

While investigating the Circle of the Dragon, sailor-adventurer Mr. Nemo rescues their young captive Val Wright, who quickly becomes an invaluable source of assistance.

== Val's Mexican Adventure ==
Published: 14 September 1957 to 29 March 1958

After her parents are killed in a plane crash, Valerie Cameron is invited to live with her Uncle Henry at his hacienda in Mexico. She arrives to find Henry absent, with the hacienda instead under the protection of the valiant, masked Silver Outlaw as enemies hope to take it over.

== Vicky at the Farm ==
Published: 21 January to 17 June 1961

Fed up of life with her bullying guardian Silas, Vicky Wren runs away from home to live with her aunt and uncle on their farm in Devon. However, Silas is not prepared to let her go so easily.

- Translated into French and published in Filette by Société Parisienne d'Édition.

== Vicky in the South Seas ==
Published: 21 April 1956 to 5 January 1957
Writer: Denise Kerry

Vicky Anderson holidays in the South Seas, soon making a firm friend in native girl Ailua of Matapanza Bay.

- Text story.

== Wanda of Bear Park ==
Published: 21 March 1953 to 13 February 1954
Writer: Stanley E. Austin (as 'Sheila Austin')

Wanda Merrick and her father take in native orphan girl Meenha as a lodger in their isolated wood cabin, and her unusual lifestyle keeps both of them on their toes.

- Text story.

== Wartime Chums of the Far East ==
Published: c. 1955

As the Japanese invade Malaya, Maureen Banks has to lead her young sister Nicky and their native friend Shara past enemy patrols to reach safety.

== Wendy's Thrilling Cruise ==
Published: c. 1959

Wendy Heaton win a cruise on board the S.S. Dorita in a newspaper competition for herself and a group of four friends.

== When the Fourth Had to Fag ==
Published: c. August 1954 to 18 September 1954

Betty Adair and her fourth form chums of Lakeside School are planning to restore an old barge for the Silvermere Regatta; however, nasty prefect Diana Potter gives them heavy fagging duties to stop them finishing in time.

== Wildflower of the Rockies ==
Published: 18 February to 1 December 1956

Marie Lane and Jean West take a camping holiday in Grand Park, a nature reserve in the Canadian Rockies, and find themselves caught up in the travails of local native girl Wildflower when they find the sign of the White Reindeer.

- A similar character with the same name as Wildflower was later featured in "Friends of the Forest".
