= School Friend (comics) =

British weekly girls' comic

- The cover of School Friend dated 5 December 1955, featuring The Silent Three. Art by Evelyn Flinders.

Publication information
- Publisher: Amalgamated Press; 1950 to 1959; Fleetway Publications; 1959 to 1965
- Schedule: Weekly
- Format: Ongoing series
- Publication date: 20 May 1950 – 23 January 1965
- No. of issues: 766
- Main character(s): Jill Crusoe; The Silent Three

Creative team
- Written by: Horace Boyten; Stewart Pride
- Artist(s): Reginald Ben Davis; E.C. Julien; Robert MacGillivray
- Editor(s): Stewart Pride

School Friend (also known as School Friend and Girls' Crystal) was a British weekly girls' comic anthology published by Amalgamated Press and Fleetway Publications from 20 May 1950 to 23 January 1965. (Note: British comics of the time featured their off sale date on the cover) Considered the first British girls' comic and bearing the same name as a popular story paper previously published by Amalgamated Press, School Friend was a huge success and effectively kickstarted the genre in British publishing.

== Creation ==
While pre-war story papers had produced female-orientated titles such as the original School Friend and Girls' Crystal, in the aftermath of World War II comic books such as Amalgamated Press' Comic Cuts and Knockout or DC Thomson's The Dandy and The Beano were considered unisex titles, and were primarily humorous in content. Meanwhile, paper rationing during the war had seen some of the most famous story papers – including The Magnet and The Gem – succumb to amalgamation with other titles. Even after the war had ended, new titles needed government approval, while a steady stream of American imports came across the Atlantic on merchant ships as comic books made ideal ballast. These included horror titles by the likes of EC Comics, which soon caused moral outrage in both America and Britain. Leading protests in the latter was Reverend Marcus Morris, who decided to mix protesting against the degenerate American publishers by setting up his own comic to save the children of Britain from depravity with the wholesome Eagle with Hulton Press. The comic was an instant smash – but primarily with boys. Operating on a similar logic, Amalgamated Press reasoned there must also be girls not being catered for, and launched School Friend as a girls' comic a month later.

School Friend's original editor was Stewart Pride, who would later go on to be group editor of Amalgamated Press' preschool titles. Pride and Horace Boyten would write the majority of the stories in the title's formative years. Stories were pulled from similar genres to the girls' story papers - school, friendships, mysteries, friendly animals and equestrianism. The initial line-up was composed of five picture strips and three text stories, as well as other prose features The former included a trio of serials - "The Silent Three of St. Kit's" occupied the colour front cover, introducing The Silent Three, based on the popular boarding school genre. The story revolved around three schoolgirls at St. Kit's boarding school — Betty Roland, Joan Derwent and Peggy West — who band together as a secret society against the tyranny of the head prefect, later also fighting crime wearing numbered masks and hooded green robes – a familiar trope from girls' story papers. Evelyn Flinders – a frequent illustrator for AP's pre-war girls' story papers – was the initial artist and would continue to draw the story until her retirement in 1959.

Another stalwart from the debut issue was "Jill Crusoe," featuring a plucky castaway with a young friend who soon gained native, leopard and parrot sidekicks. Like "The Silent Three", Jill would return frequently in adventures drawn by Reginald Ben Davis, who would become one of the title's most prolific artists. The other launch serial was damsel-in-distress swashbuckler "The Gay Cavalier". As well as the serials, the first issue included two other enduring strips – "Terry Brent, Detective" featured a dashing young detective solving minor problems for hapless females; readers were given clues to try to beat Terry to the solve, a device later used on the Lion strips "Bruce Kent, Detective" and – most famously – "Spot the Clue with Zip Nolan". The other was Dilly Dreem, a cheerful but hapless bumbler with oversized spectacles forever resting on the very tip of her nose whose single-page humour strip proclaimed her to be a "loveable duffer".

== Publishing history ==
The cover of the 23 August 1961 edition of School Friend.

The comic was published every Wednesday, initially priced at 3d, and the first issue featured a free 'Album of Radio Stars' to tempt buyers. Sales swiftly reached one million, even more than Eagle, and would stay at around that level for several years. School Friend's success saw Hulton produce Girl in response in 1951, while AP overhauled the long-running Girls' Crystal in 1953, turning it into a picture comic between weekly editions. Some of John M. Burns' earliest work in comics was for School Friend. Cecil Langley Doughty, Harry Hargreaves, and Tom Kerr were also contributing artists. Illustrators were recruited via such art agencies as Dick and Jack Wall, Danny and Pat Kelleher's Temple Art Agency, Barry Coker's Bardon Art Associates by, and Luis Llorente's Creaciones Ilustradas. Frank Redpath, later to become known as a poet, wrote scripts for the strip "Lucky's Living Doll" (later continued in June as "Lucky and Tina").

While many of the stories revolved around similar premises – secret societies, wrongly accused heroines, plucky girls getting caught up in some passing intrigue, Alpine skiing schools, romantic history tales – the comic did occasionally stray into supernatural-tinged adventures on occasion, such as with "Phantom Ballerina" and "Jane and the Ghostly Hound", which owed a debt to the Gothic romance. Another feature along these lines was "The Strangest Stories Ever Told", an anthology strip featuring the mysterious Storyteller relating twist-in-the-tale stories with supernatural overtones.

A takeover by the Mirror Group saw AP renamed Fleetway Publications in 1959, but School Friend would survive another six years. From 1960, the back cover joined the front in being in colour. From 1962 it was joined by School Friend Picture Library – twice-monthly 64-page digest-sized stories edited by Jack Hunt, and featuring similar subject matter to the weekly – though ironically most of School Friend's regulars such as the Silent Three had already been appearing in a different digest, Schoolgirls Picture Library, which had been established in 1957. By 1962 circulation was 414,000 and still one of Fleetway's strongest sellers.

In 1963 Girl's Crystal was folded into School Friend, which was then known as School Friend and Girl's Crystal. The strip "My Friend Sara" — 'as told by Wendy Lee' — took over the cover of School Friend and Girl's Crystal in the same year, while Bessie Bunter – star of the original School Friend – was brought out of retirement for a one-page humour strip in an attempt to repeat the success her more famous brother Billy was experiencing after his revival in Knockout and Valiant. These changes stayed in place until the publication's merger with June in 1965 as it was overtaken by a wave of newer titles, and showing its age. "Bessie Bunter", "Mam'selle X", and "The Strangest Stories Ever Told" continued on in the merged title.

The name continued in Picture Library format, with Schoolgirl Picture Library renamed June and School Friend Picture Library from 1965, beginning with #328. As with many Fleetway titles, annuals also continued to be issued in the School Friend name long after the comic had disappeared from newsagents; the last School Friend Annual was dated 1972.

Since 2018, School Friend has been owned by Rebellion Publishing.

== Titles ==
- School Friend (20 May 1950 to 18 May 1963)
- School Friend and Girls' Crystal (25 May 1963 to 23 January 1965)

== Spin-offs ==
- School Friend Annual (23 editions, 1952 to 1974) (Note: British annuals were typically issued in the autumn of the year preceding that on the cover)
- School Friend Picture Library (38+ editions, February 1962 to 1965)

== Reception ==
It has been argued that some of School Friend's proactive teenage heroines could be interpreted as proto-feminists. While the comic was primarily read by working class girls, School Friend featured many so-called 'aspirational' stories depicting upper class activities; few of those reading would ever experience boarding schools, holidays in Switzerland or even horse-riding personally but stories revolving around such activities were wildly popular.
