= June (comics) =

British weekly girls' comic

- The cover of June, dated 16 February 1963, featuring June and Jiffy. Art by Cecil Orr.

Publication information
- Publisher: Fleetway Publications; 1961 to 1969; IPC Magazines; 1969 to 1974
- Schedule: Weekly (Tuesdays); 18 March 1961 to 19 January 1974; Fortnightly; 19 January to 30 March 1974; Weekly; 6 April to 15 June 1974
- Format: Ongoing series
- Publication date: 18 March 1961 – 15 June 1974
- No. of issues: 631

Creative team
- Artist(s): John Armstrong; Jim Baikie; Reginald Ben Davis; Robert MacGillivray; Cecil Orr
- Editor(s): Jack Hunt; Mavis Miller

June (also known as June and Poppet, June and School Friend and June and Pixie at various points) was a British weekly girls' comic anthology published by Fleetway Publications and IPC Magazines from 18 March 1961 to 15 June 1974. (Note: British comics of the time featured their off sale date on the cover) Designed as a response to DC Thomson's hit Bunty, June never quite eclipsed its Scottish rival but was nevertheless a success on its own terms, reaching 631 issues before being merged into Tammy in 1974.

== Creation ==
As Amalgamated Press, Fleetway Publications had effectively created the British girls' comic with the million-selling School Friend in 1950, and the likes of Hulton Press' Girl and AP's own revamped Girls' Crystal soon cashed in on the market. However, the area turned out to be fast-moving and when Dundee publisher DC Thomson finally entered the market in 1958 with Bunty, its fusion of girls staples with a healthy contingent of relatable waifs and strays saw it chime better with young female readers. After the Mirror Group rebranded AP as Fleetway they set about modernising their girls' comics in response, while Leonard Matthews launched the more aspirational Princess in 1960. The following year Fleetway launched their direct response to Bunty in the shape of June, edited by Jack Hunt (who had been behind the modernisation of Girls' Crystal).

The opening line-up included domestic comedy-drama "Diana's Diary", using a similar premise to the successful Princess story "The Happy Days"; riding stable story "Against All Odds", orphan-at-boarding-school staple "Kathy at Marvin Grange School", which would be a firm readers' favourite and run for the rest of the sixties; treasure hunt thriller "The Black Pearls of Taboo Island"; and historical civil war story "When Did You Last See Your Father?". The strips were joined by a trio of text stories — serialisations of Enid Blyton's "The Mystery of Banshee Towers" and author-cum-showjumper Pat Smythe's latest Three Jays adventure, as well as an adaptation of Felix Salten's Bambi's Children, partly designed to cash in on the box office success of Disney's animated film of Bambi, while humour was provided by cartoons "Cloris and Claire - The Sporting Pair", "My Dog Cuddles" and "Jenny". Gerald Durrell meanwhile provided a column on his "Zoo Friends". The comic was 32 pages, and priced at 4½d, with a colour photographic cover and black-and-white interiors.

== Publishing history ==
=== June ===
To ensure a strong launch, Fleetway provided free gifts for the first four issues - a floral bracelet (not unlike the one provided with Princess the previous year); an album containing information about the Royal Family's pets, and two weeks containing free gift cards to paste into said album. In September 1961 the comic dropped the photographic covers - which generally reproduced poorly on the newsprint stock - in favour of full-page art and went down to 24 pages, while the initial line-up went through the usual changes. "Tennis Star Tina" was drawn by Italian artist Giorgio Giorgetti and written by Anne Digby, who had written columns for Girl and School Friend and would find greater fame in the late 1970s authoring the Trebizon novels, had debuted in June 1961, while in October "Nurse Valiant" would be the first of several stories in June to revolve around nursing.

8 September 1962 saw the magazine have another makeover as a namesake character was devised to take over the front page in a single-frame Cecil Orr cartoon showing June and her dog Jiffy in a succession of humorous scenes, while the back page was devoted to a pin-up photo of hunks such as Adam Faith, TV's Ben Casey Vince Edwards, Bill Simpson and Ken Dodd. Meanwhile comic's feature pages saw the arrival of Angela Barrie, who would dispense fashion tips and gentle advice for the rest of June's life. At this point, the comic's circulation was 287,000 copies a week. Another long-running feature, "Vanessa from Venus", debuted in March 1963; while a variation on the person genie genre, it was the first of several June stories to feature fantastical elements rare for girls' comics of the time.

=== June and Poppet ===
The 18 July 1964 edition saw June absorb the short-lived sister title Poppet. The merger brought with it slice-of-life strip "The Family at Surprise Corner", which would continue in June until but otherwise brought little else beyond the conclusion of "Rosita and Her Puppets" (a redrawn version of "Pepita and Her Puppets" from School Friend), though the first combined issue boasted a colour photo of Cilla Black as a free gift. However, the Poppet title would only appear for five editions before disappearing, after which the title returned to simply June. The 31 October 1964 edition saw June move to 28 pages.

=== June and School Friend ===
By now Mavis Miller was editor of the title (with Terry Magee, a future editor of Battle, as one of her assistants), and in January 1965 saw a much more lasting merger when the venerable School Friend was rolled into what was now June and School Friend. A price rise to 7d was offset by the inclusion of Lulu's Friendship Album and an expansion to a hefty 44 pages - the production costs being offset by a healthy influx of reprints from School Friend and Girls' Crystal. Market research had shown children typically stuck with comics for only five years, and therefore anything older than five years which wasn't obviously dated was considered for reprinting. The merger also brought "Lucky's Living Doll" (which would stay with June until it was cancelled) and the John Armstrong-drawn working class weepie "Cherry and the Children", as well as anthology feature "The Strangest Stories Ever Told". It also brought Bessie Bunter; while she would never reach the same level of fame as her brother, the "plump chump" would outlive the comic. June and Jiffy meanwhile were retired, in favour of colour splash covers. September 1965 saw the introduction of the all-action Jacey North in "Miss Adventure"; the character would go onto appear in several picture libraries.

The June and School Friend brand was considered strong enough to stay on the comic for the best part of seven years, and was even used for a Picture Library title, taking over the numbering of the long-running Schoolgirls' Picture Library in October 1965; from 1966 the publication became the wordy June and School Friend and Princess Picture Library. Stories under the June and School Friend name included the fantasy-tinged "Mimi the Mesmerist", Picture Library jungle princess Zanna the Brave and long-running winter sport story "Adventure School".

January 1966 saw the appearance of young spy Emma Knight in "The Growing Up of Emma Peel", a prequel featuring the hugely popular character from ABC's The Avengers. Bizarrely, this was parallel to the adult version of the character co-starring with John Steed in the pages of rival Polystyle's TV Comic. A longer-lasting licensing deal would come in April 1967 when the adventures of fashion doll Sindy, her boyfriend Paul and troublesome baby sister Patch were added. The strip would run until 1971, though a club page - detailing new releases in toy stores - would continue afterwards.

1968 saw another dabble with an unusual heroine in "Fourth Form Wonder", which starred Tibetan Lan Trafford, who had learnt a succession of unusual powers from yogis and unleashed them on an English school. The strip was one of several in a January 1968 relaunch, which saw Lula reappear on the cover to endorse the free 'Hand of Fortune glove'. "Serena from Space" meanwhile gave a science fiction twist to a treasure hunt story, while in 1969 the Trini Tinturé-drawn "Oh, Tinker!" followed a hard-trying but hapless fairy. "Gymnast Jinty" followed the more traditional mix of boarding schools and aerobics, but was distinguished by some of the earliest work by artist Jim Baikie. Another popular artist to get an early break out June was John M. Burns, who drew the science fiction-hostess hybrid "Glory Knight - Time-Travel Courier".

=== June ===
The School Friend part of the name finally disappeared in November 1971, by which point John Purdy had begun his overhaul of what was now IPC Magazines' girls' comics following some of the earliest in-depth market research into girls' comics readers revealed that the audience wanted relatable, resourceful heroines and - in the words of one Midlands ten-year old "stories that make me cry". This research would lead to the creation of the hugely successful Tammy, but filtered down to June as well. A November 1971 relaunch saw the debut of the tear-stained "The Lonely Ones", "No Place for Nell" and "My Name is Nobody", as well as moral dilemma-strewn "The Reluctant Nurse" and quasi-advice strip "Could This Be You?". 1972 kept up the trend, with boarding school bullies in "The Guinea Pig", poverty in "From Big House to Backstreet" and a tuberculosis-slain mother in "Promise Me, Paula!". Lulu was once again involved, hosting a fashion contest where readers could win £1 a week pocket money for two years; artwork of the Scots singer adorned the cover scattering banknotes underlined the potential jackpot.

=== June and Pixie ===
January 1973 brought another merger as Pixie, an unsuccessful attempt to find a market between preschool titles and the likes of June, was subsumed. This brought music-themed serial "Melody for Mimi" and humour cartoon "Mini Ha-Ha" but little else, though the first issue of June and Pixie saw the launch of several new stories including horsey drama "The Silver Savage", barracks comedy "Annie's Army" and more melodrama in the form of "Sister of the Bride" (in which a girl is torn between being happy for her sister's upcoming nuptials and her own impending loneliness) and the travails of having a blind brother in "His Guiding Star", as well as including a free 'Book of Stars'. Similar overwrought stories playing on cruelty and alienation continued - "I'll Never Leave You" saw a girl stuck between staying with her family and keeping a promise to a hospitalised friend; the title character of "Sylvie on a String" similarly faced conflict over whether to go to a top gymnastics school or look after her fading grandmother; and "The Twin She Couldn't Trust" saw an orphan reunited with her twin sister, only to find a bitter and twisted version of herself.

Despite this, June was falling behind the times and the writing was on the wall for the comic in early 1974, when the impact of the fuel crisis saw the comic stepped down to fortnightly in January to free up resources for bigger sellers. June returned to weekly publication by the end of March but would continue for only three months more before being merged into Tammy.

=== Post-cancellation developments ===
In 2007, Prion issued a hardcover compilation titled The Best of June and School Friend, featuring strips and features from the weekly.

Since 2018, the material created for June has been owned by Rebellion Publishing.

== Titles ==
- June (18 March 1961 to 11 July 1964)
- June and Poppet (18 July to 15 August 1964)
- June (22 August 1964 to 23 January 1965)
- June and School Friend (30 January 1965 to 13 November 1971)
- June (20 November 1971 to 13 January 1973)
- June and Pixie (20 January 1973 to 15 June 1974)

== Spin-offs ==
- June Book (21 editions, 1962 to 1982) (Note: British annuals were typically issued in the autumn of the year preceding that on the cover)
- June and School Friend Holiday Special (? editions, ? to 1971)
- June and School Friend Picture Library (254 editions, 1965 to 1971)
- June and School Friend Book of Heroines (2 editions, 1970 to 1971)
- June and Sandie Holiday Special (1 edition, 1972)
- June and Pixie Holiday Special (2 editions, 1973 to 1974)
