= The Silent Three =

- "The Silent Three" from School Friend, c. 1950
- Author(s): Horace Boyten and Stewart Pride
- Illustrator: Evelyn Flinders
- Current status/schedule: Concluded weekly strip
- Launch date: 1950
- End date: 1963
- Publisher: School Friend
- Genre: Drama

The Silent Three (originally The Silent Three of St. Kit's) was a British comic strip published in the girls' comics magazine School Friend from 1950 to 1963, written by Horace Boyten and Stewart Pride, and originally illustrated by Evelyn Flinders. Three schoolgirls at St. Kit's boarding school, Betty Roland (mask #1), Joan Derwent (mask #2) and Peggy West (mask #3), banded together as a secret society against the tyranny of the head prefect, later also fighting crime wearing numbered masks and hooded green robes. In 1977 Posy Simmonds drew a weekly strip for The Guardian entitled The Silent Three of St Botolph's in tribute.
