= Poppet (comics) =

British weekly girls' comic

- The cover of Poppet, dated 16 November 1963, featuring Sally Starr of "The Family at Surprise Corner".

Publication information
- Publisher: Fleetway Publications; 1963 to 1964
- Schedule: Weekly (Wednesdays)
- Format: Ongoing series
- Publication date: 5 October 1963 – 11 July 1964
- No. of issues: 41
- Editor(s): Jack Hunt

Poppet was a British weekly girls' comic anthology published by Fleetway Publications from 5 October 1963 to 11 July 1964 (Note: British comics of the time featured their off sale date on the cover). The title was short-lived, running for 41 issues before being merged into June.

== Creation ==
After the successful launch of June, Fleetway Publications looked at launching similar titles as the company responded to the runaway sales of rival DC Thomson's Bunty and Judy. Poppet effectively replaced the venerable Girls' Crystal, which had been merged into School Friend in May 1963 after sales had dropped to 164,000 a week. Having worked on both Girls' Crystal and June, Jack Hunt was assigned as editor of the new title. Poppet was 28 pages, had a painted full-colour front cover with black and white interiors, and priced at 6d. The back cover was also in colour, and was used to print pictures of popstars – beginning with The Beatles on the first issue.

== Publishing history ==
Poppet was launched with a promotional campaign that included television advertising. The first issue featured a free 'Clover Leaf Bracelet'; the second came with a 'Horseshoe Ring' and the third a 'Birthday Book'.

The initial line-up consisted of the highwaywoman story "Black Velvet", which had been devised some years before by Leonard Matthews for a boys' adventure feature – however, a belief that male readers wouldn't accept a female-led strip saw the highwaywoman turned into Moll Moonlight, a companion of Dick Turpin and – later – Jack o' Justice; "House of Mystery", a translated version of a Michel Regnier/Paul Cuvelier story from French comic Line; young horse-lover Molly Brown and clean-cut private detective Simon Crane. The comic's main draw was "Surprise Corner", a family comedy-drama similar to Princess story "The Happy Days", with Sally Starr narrating her family's adventures after they move into the eponymous antiques shop. At 12 pages, the story was the longest regular feature published in a British weekly comic.

Poppet's other area of interest was pop music; the comic launched as Beatlemania was taking hold, and the comic carried features and pinups of the likes of The Beatles, Gerry and the Pacemakers, The Swinging Blue Jeans and Tommy Roe alongside more traditional girls' comic fare like "Looking at Legends" (explaining the history behind various folk tales) and creature feature "Wonders of Nature". January saw the celebrity content cross into the comic with the four-part "The Beatles Story", a Pat Brookman-written history of the group to date. By this point, Poppet also featured many reprints from the Fleetway archive; among the devices used was the comic's namesake asking her Uncle Charles to tell her stories. An unusual inclusion was reprints of "Space Family Rollinson" from Knockout; while the latter commenced as a unisex humour title in 1939, by the 1960s, it had morphed into a boys' adventure comic.

Even with these cost-cutting measures, Poppet fell below its break-even point and, in July 1964, was merged with June after 41 issues. "Surprise Corner" made the journey across and would run for another four years, with Molly Brown and several of the reprints finishing their storylines in the pages of June.

In 2018 the rights to the material created for Poppet were among those purchased by Rebellion Publishing.

== Stories ==
=== Aggie, She Knows All the Answers ===
Published: 5 October 1963 to 20 June 1964

A pigtailed, bespectacled schoolgirl poses themed trivia questions.

- One-page cartoon.

=== Black Velvet ===
Published: 5 October 1963 to 8 February 1964
Artist: Geoff Campion

Daring highwaywoman Black Velvet and her companions – Pearl Damask and Jack Oldacre – right wrongs and investigate mysteries in rural England.

=== The Beatles Story ===
Published: 25 January to 8 February 1964
Writer: Pat Brookman

The story of how John, Paul, George and the other one worked hard to become the world's foremost popular beat combo.

=== Call of the Circus ===
Published: 15 February to 28 March 1964
Artist: Robert MacGillivray

Horse expert Jill Logan becomes fascinated with the idea of joining a circus as a rider – much to the disapproval of her fiancé Hugh Fitch.

- Reprinted from School Friend.

=== Fifi ===
Published: 5 October 1963 to 18 April 1964

A small bob cut schoolgirl pits her wits against her friends and neighbours, often coming off worse.

- Quarter-page humour cartoon.

=== The Girls of Nut House School ===
Published: 5 October 1963 to 14 March 1964

The pupils of Nut House School swap jokes.

- Small humour cartoon.

=== Happy Ever After ===
Published: 15 February to 21 March 1964

- Picture strips based on real-life celebrities' romantic lives.

=== House of Mystery ===
Published: 5 October 1963 to 22 February 1964
Writer: Michel Regnier
Artist: Paul Cuvelier

On holiday in France with her aunt, Pauline Pedin attempts to return a valuable tie pin to the man who dropped it. She is drawn into a mystery surrounding a gothic mansion owned by a strange lady called Medina.

- Reprint of "La Maison du Mystère" from Line.

=== Kendru the Jungle Boy ===
Published: c. April/May to 11 July 1964

Working with her uncle at a village in Indochina, Janet sets up a school for the local children – and grabs the attention of jungle boy Kendru.

- Modified reprints of "Janet's Jungle School" from School Friend. Continued in June.

=== Molly Brown ===
Published: 5 October 1963 to 11 July 1964

Horse-loving schoolgirl Molly Brown nurses and trains a succession of equines – including old milkman's horse Lady, Lady's show-jumping foal Champion, and her father-in-law's award-winning Satan.

- Connected serials – the first titled "Looking After Lady", the second "Molly and Champion", and the third "Jumping for Joy". Continued in June.

=== Rosita and Her Puppets ===
Published: 27 June to 11 July 1964

Despite having a cruel stepmother, Italian village girl Rosita brings joy to the community with her puppet shows.

- Modified reprints of "Pepita and Her Puppets" from School Friend, continued in June.

=== Simon Crane – Private Detective ===
Published: 5 October 1963 to 11 January 1964

Dashing detective Simon Crane helps girls in distress solve mysteries.

=== Space Family ===
Published: c. April/May to 11 July 1964
Artists: Graham Coton, Ian Kennedy

Dad and Mom Rollinson and their children Alan, Ann, Tommy, and Janet are kidnapped by Zektron aliens, who then abandon them near Saturn.

- Modified reprints of "The Space-Family Rollinson" from Knockout.

=== Sue of the Circus ===
Published: 5 October 1963 to 11 July 1964

When Carter's Circus arrives in town, Sue Scott applies for a job – and soon finds out there are rum goings-on aplenty when it is targeted by the enigmatic Seventh Clown.

- Modified reprints of "Patsy's Circus Days" from School Friend.

=== Surprise Corner ===
Published: 5 October 1963 to 11 July 1964
Writer/s: Jenny Burton

Sally Starr lives with her family in an antiques store, Surprise Corner, and always finds surprising things happening.

- Later renamed "The Family at Star Corner". Continued in June.

=== Their Feud at the Holiday Farm ===
Published: 28 March to 18 April 1964

A class of pupils from St. Gwen's School make a working visit to help with the harvest at Glenmead Farm, but Sheila Barton and Trudy Holt soon find themselves targeted by a sinister troublemaker.

- Reprinted from Girls' Crystal.

=== Treasure at Windy Ridge ===
Published: c. April/May to 11 July 1964

In the late 19th century, Jo Stokes travels to the coast to visit her Aunt Ella. Leaving Victoria station, she is given a fan by a young man named Peter Lakin, and is astonished to find it features an exact painting of Ella's home, Westwinds on it.

- Modified reprints of "Jo's Seaside Adventure" from Girls' Crystal.

=== Uncle Charles ===
Published: 5 October 1963 to 18 April 1964

Poppet's Uncle Charles tells his niece tales he gathered on his travels around the ~~Fleetway archive~~ world.
