= Evelyn Flinders =

British comics artist

"The Silent Three" from School Friend, c. 1950

Evelyn Betty Flinders (21 March 1910 – 31 October 1997) was a British comics artist who worked in girls' comics. She entered the Hornsey School of Art at the age of fifteen, and in 1928 got her first job with the Amalgamated Press, drawing for Schooldays. By the time she was 21 she had drawn for virtually all of AP's girls' weekly publications. When School Friend relaunched in 1950, her strip The Silent Three, written by Horace Boyten and Stewart Pride, was the cover feature. Flinders retired in 1959. She died on 31 October 1997, at the age of 87.
