= Girls' Crystal =

British weekly girls' story paper, and later comic

- The cover of the 28 August 1937 edition of Girls' Crystal story paper.
- Editor: Reg Eves
- Staff writers: Horace E. Boyten (Note: Under the pseudonyms 'Enid Boyten', 'Hilda Boyten' and 'Helen Crawford'); Ronald Fleming (Note: Under the pseudonyms 'Peter Langley' and 'Rhoda Fleming'); G. Cecil Gravely (Note: Under the pseudonym 'Daphne Grayson')
- Frequency: Weekly (Tuesdays)
- Publisher: Amalgamated Press
- First issue: 26 October 1935
- Final issue Number: 14 March 1953; 908
- Country: United Kingdom
- Based in: London
- Language: English

Girls' Crystal (also known as The Crystal, Girls' Crystal Weekly and Girls' Crystal and School Girl at various points) was a British weekly fictional anthology publication aimed at girls. Published by Amalgamated Press and later Fleetway Publications from 26 October 1935 to 18 May 1963. (Note: British weeklies of the time featured their off sale date on the cover) Uniquely for an Amalgamated Press title, Girls' Crystal began as a story paper before transforming into a picture comic between editions, with the new format debuting on 21 March 1953. It ran for a combined total of 1432 issues before merging with School Friend in 1963.

== Publishing history ==
After audience research revealed that story papers such as The Magnet and The Gem had a sizeable female readership, Amalgamated Press took advantage of this audience by launching The School Friend in 1919, the first such paper aimed squarely at girls. It was a success, and was soon joined by sister title The Schoolgirl - not to mention numerous rivals launched by other publishers during the period between the wars - one author Denis Gifford would describe as "the Golden Age of story papers". School Friend folded into The Schoolgirl in 1929, but in 1935 AP decided to launch another girls' paper. The publication launched on 28 October 1935 as The Crystal, initially with a full-colour cover and using a 'dainty silverine bracelet' to tempt girls into a purchase; the first issue's editorial promised a further gift the next issue in the form of a 'Film Star Autograph and Photograph Album'. In common with many girls' story papers, the majority of the material in the title was written by men.

The cover of the first issue of The Crystal story paper, dated 26 October 1935.

The opening line-up consisted of seven stories; the lead feature starred Detective Noel Raymond - ably assisted in his sleuthing by his niece June Gaynor - was unusual in a girls' magazine that both the main character and the writer pseudonym were male, with Ronald Fleming penning Noel and June's adventures under the name 'Peter Langley'. Stewart Pride, later editor of the comic version of School Friend, would later suggest "presumably it was felt that a woman could not write about a male detective". One of the paper's most popular stories, it would run until 1951. Fleming also contributed school story "The Madcap Form Mistress" to the opening issue, disguising himself as 'Jean Vernon' (a common tactic used by AP and other story paper publishers, to disguise how few writers were employed by each title) but the feature would be relatively short-lived.

Another long-running feature was G. Cecil Gravely "Merrymakers" series, credited to 'Daphne Grayson'; Girls' Crystal would settle down to contain four or five stories an issue. With the tenth issue (dated 28 December 1935), the publication changed title to The Girls' Crystal, and changed to a cover with red and blue overlays. Stories revolved around adventurous, plucky teenage girls never afraid to put themselves out to help someone in trouble, and rarely featured romantic storylines.

Stories from Girls' Crystal were reprinted in Schoolgirls' Own Library and, from 1939 on, the hardback Girls' Crystal Annual. The latter supplemented its fictional contents with various lifestyle tips - including how to create a colourful dusting brush.

The outbreak of World War II in 1939 saw paper rationing reduce many publications, while large numbers of AP's staff were called up for war service (including Fleming). Girls' Crystal's full page front cover was reduced to half a page, while the page count dropped as low as 12. While many story papers were either merged or cancelled during the conflict, Girls' Crystal survived, and in 1940 absorbed AP's other girls' paper, The Schoolgirl. Author Horace E. Boyten wrote some stories under the pseudonym "Enid Boyten." In 1953, lawyers for the popular children's writer Enid Blyton complained to Girls' Crystal editor Reg Eves that the names were similar enough that the publication was trying to cash in on Blyton's fame. Eves denied the charge, but from then on Boyten wrote under the name 'Hilda Boyten' (later changing it again to 'Helen Crawford').

=== Titles ===
- The Crystal (28 August to 28 December 1937)
- Girls' Crystal Weekly (4 January 1938 to 19 May 1939)
- Girls' Crystal incorporating Schoolgirl's Weekly (26 May 1939 to 18 May 1940)
- Girls' Crystal and the School Girl (25 May 1940 to 14 March 1953)

== Comic ==
Girls' Crystal
- The cover of the 21 March 1953 edition of Girls Crystal - the issue when the long-running story paper converted into a comic book.

Publication information
- Publisher: Amalgamated Press; 1953 to 1959; Fleetway Publications; 1959 to 1963
- Schedule: Weekly (Tuesdays)
- Format: Ongoing series
- Publication date: 21 March 1953 – 18 May 1963
- No. of issues: 524
- Editor(s): Jack Hunt

=== Publishing history ===
In 1950, AP launched School Friend (resurrecting the name of their first girls' story paper) as the first picture comic aimed specifically at girls, and its huge success showed that post-war female readers were interested in comics specifically catering for them. Hulton Press launched Girl in response in 1951, and with the 21 March 1953 issue - the title's 909th - Girls' Crystal converted from story paper to comic book, continuing the numbering. The comic relaunched with six picture stories but like most of the period retained some text stories.

The strips included cruise drama "Merle's Voyage of Mystery" (which occupied the cover, the sole colour page in the issue), "Naida of the Jungle" (featuring a character from the story paper days). "Val - the Girl Who Helped Mr. Nemo" (loosely following the format of Noel Raymond, where a male hero was aided by a female assistant), girl-and-canine adventures with "Bruce the Circus Dog" and light-hearted one-page strip "Not-So-Simple Susie". Text stories were represented by "Molly in Morocco" by Doris Graham (unusually, a pseudonym for a female writer in the form of Doris Gravely, the wife of G. Cecil Gravely), "Wanda of Bear Park" by Stanley Austin as Sheila Austin and "Trixie's Diary", excerpts from the weekly adventures of a schoolgirl purportedly 'edited' by Ida Melbourne (actually L.E. Ransom). While most features would swiftly rotate out after a few months, the latter proved to be one of Girls' Crystal's most enduring stories, running for eight years before ending in April 1961.

For much of the rest of the fifties Girls' Crystal stuck to similar genres - boarding school drama, typically featuring Fourth Formers (Note: At the time, the final year of schooling at around 15 in the British educational system; at many schools the Fourth Form had privileges linked to use of previously-restricted facilities) such as "Loyal to the Sports Mistress" (1954), "The Fourth Form Treasure Seekers" (1957), and "Molly and the Phantom Circle" (1958); Alpine holidays with a heavy emphasis on skiing - including "Friends of the Gipsy Skater" (1953–54), "The Skating Coach's Amazing Secret" (1956-57), and "Pat's Tyrolean Pen-Friend" (1958); ballet - as in "The Mystery Ballerina" (1954), "The Schoolgirl Ballet Dancers" (1956), and "Her Strange Quest in the Ballet" (1958–59); and horses, like "Moira and the Masked Rider" (1956), "The Horse They Had to Hide" (1958) and "Dinah and Her Mystery Horse" (1959). Typical devices involved two friends arriving at an exotic locale, discovering someone in trouble and resolving to help, or orphans trying to find an escape from cruel guardians, who were often keeping some secret from them. There were however some other genres relatively unusual for girls' comics of the time, including the World War II-set "Wartime Chums of the Far East" (1955) and "Their Wartime Task" (1958). While most features again proved transitory, October 1956 saw the introduction of one-pager "Star the Sheepdog" as a replacement for Bruce; Star and owner Meg would occupy the back page of Girls' Crystal until 1961.

Amalgamated Press was acquired by the Mirror Group in 1959, and the publication of Girls' Crystal was taken over by Fleetway Publications. By this point both it and School Friend were becoming seen as distinctly dowdy compared to DC Thomson's recently launched Bunty, and Girls' Crystal was modernised in the early 1960s to compete. New stories included "Cherry and Her Children", drawn by John Armstrong, which eschewed boarding schools and skiing holidays to tell the story of a young working-class girl looking after her two smaller siblings while their mother worked in a cigarette factory. Another attempt at a more relatable heroine was Anne Arnold of "I Want to Be a Nurse!", while more adventurous girls were catered for by "Mam'selle X", which told the story of Avril Claire - an actress hated by day as she put on shows for Nazis in order to cover her secret activities as one of the French Resistance's top agents. 1961 also saw a brief reappearance for Noel Raymond as a picture strip, though he failed to make much of an impression on the comic's later readership and returned to retirement after a few short months. Art during this period also included early work by John M. Burns, Luis Bermejo and Tom Kerr.

Despite this, sales fell to 164,000 a week and the title succumbed to amalgamation in May 1963, being merged into School Friend. "Mam'selle X", "Cherry and the Children" and text story "That Girl Patsy" all continued - indeed, the two strips would outlast School Friend as well, surviving into June. As was common with many Fleetway titles, the Girls Crystal Annual continued long after the weekly, with the final book in the series bearing the date of 1976.

Since 2018, the rights to Girls' Crystal have been owned by Rebellion Publishing.

=== Titles ===
- Girls' Crystal and the Schoolgirl (21 March 1953 to 11 February 1961)
- Girls' Crystal (18 February 1961 to 18 May 1963)
- School Friend and Girls' Crystal (25 May 1963 to 23 January 1965)

== Spin-offs ==
- Girls' Crystal Annual (37 editions, 1940 to 1976) (Note: British annuals were typically issued in the autumn of the year preceding that on the cover)
