= Frank Redpath =

Frank Redpath (1927–1990) was a Hull poet. He taught at Hull College of Further Education, after a period writing for children's comics (including School Friend) in London. He features in Douglas Dunn's 1982 anthology of Hull poets A Rumoured City, alongside Sean O’Brien, Douglas Houston and Peter Didsbury. Fellow Hull based poet Philip Larkin contributed a preface to the anthology. Writing to Redpath, Larkin declared "Yours are the only poems in the book I would have been glad to have written."

Redpath forms the subject of Sean O’Brien's elegy "To the Unknown God of Hull and Holderness". His collections are To the Village and Other Poems (Sonus Press, 1986) and How It Turned Out: Selected Poems (Rialto, 1996).

In 2015 his poem "In and Out" was published in the Times Literary Supplement, mistakenly presented as a newly discovered poem by Philip Larkin, a mistake that resulted in Redpath trending on Twitter.

Lines from a poem of Redpath's are inscribed on a statue off Great Union Street in the Drypool district of East Hull. The statue sits on the site of St Peter's church, which was destroyed by enemy action in 1941, and Redpath's poem is in the voice of the apostle Simon Peter.
