= Reginald Ben Davis =

British wildlife artist

Reginald Ben Davis (1907–1998) was a British wildlife artist who contributed many painted pages to Look and Learn and Treasure magazines. Davis also drew comic strips and cover illustrations for girls' comics (Jill Crusoe in School Friend).
