= List of 20th-century general encyclopedias in English =

== 1900s ==
=== 1900 ===
- International Encyclopaedia and Dictionary (1900) - a descendant of the Popular Encyclopedia or Conversations Lexicon (1841)
  - International dictionary and cyclopaedia (1901)
  - Imperial Dictionary and Cyclopaedia (1901)
    - New Popular Encyclopaedia British ed. (1901), based on Blackie's Modern Cyclopaedia of Universal Information (1889) itself based on Popular Encyclopedia or Conversations Lexicon (1841)
    - Modern Encyclopaedia of Universal Information British ed. (1906)
      - XXth century Cyclopaedia and Atlas (1901) - a reissue of New Cabinet Cyclopaedia and Treasury of Knowledge (1891), itself based on Blackie's Modern Cyclopaedia of Universal Information (1889)
      - New Twentieth Century Cyclopaedia (1903)
      - New and Complete Universal Self-Pronouncing Dictionary (1905)
      - New Cosmopolitan Encyclopaedia (1906)
      - National Encyclopedia of Reference (1912)
- The Nuttall Encyclopædia (1900)
- Standard American Book of Knowledge (1900) - a reissue of Standard Cyclopedia (1897)
  - 20th Century Cyclopedia of Universal Knowledge (1901)
  - World's Book of Knowledge (1901)
  - New Century Cyclopedia of Universal Knowledge (1902)
  - American Educator and Library of Knowledge (1902)
  - Standard Library of Knowledge (1904)
- Student's Cycopaedia (1900)
  - Student's Reference Work (1903)
  - New Student's Reference Work (1909)
  - How and Why Library (1913) This was a supplement to the above that, in 1934, was acquired by another company and spun off into a new work. Later incorporated into Childcraft.
  - Modern American Encyclopedia (1934)
- Universal Cyclopaedia (1900) - a reissue of Johnson's New Universal Cyclopaedia (1876)
- Universal Reference Library (1900) a reissue of Universal Cyclopaedia and Dictionary edited by Charles Morris (1898)
  - Twentieth Century Encyclopedia (1901)
  - Imperial Reference Library (1901)
  - Current Cyclopedia of Reference (1909)

=== 1901 ===
- Century Dictionary and Cyclopedia (1901) - a reissue of the Century Dictionary (1889)
- Current Encyclopedia (July 1901 - April 1902?) an attempt at a "periodical" reference work. Later merged with Progress to form The World To-Day.
- Handy Cyclopedia of Common Things and Biographical Dictionary (1901)
  - Twentieth Century Cyclopedia of Practical Knowledge (1901)
- Hill's Practical Encyclopedia (1901)
  - School Library Encyclopedia (1901)
  - Hill's Practical Reference Library (1902)
  - New Practical Reference Library (1907)
  - American Educator (1919)
    - Dominion Educator (1919) Canadian ed.
    - New General Encyclopedia (1935) Canadian ed.
- Popular Compendium of Useful Information (1901) a one volume reference work edited by Charles Smith Morris
  - Twentieth Century Cyclopedia of Useful Information (1901)
  - World Encyclopaedia (1901)
  - Golden Treasury of Useful Information (1902)
  - Worlds Best Information and How to Use It (1902)
  - Home Cyclopedia of Useful Knowledge (1902)
  - Home Educator in Necessary Knowledge (1905)
  - Everybody's Encyclopedia for Everyday Reference (1907)
  - Cyclopedia, Dictionary and Atlas of the World (1909)

=== 1902 ===
- Anglo-American Encyclopedia and Dictionary (1902) - an unauthorized reprint of portions of the Encyclopedia Britannica with an unrelated dictionary attached. (Link includes vols. 2-4, 6-9, 11-12)
  - New American Comprehensive Encyclopedia (1906) (Link includes vols. 1, 3 and 4)
- Century Book of Facts (1902) a quasi-annual one volume work
  - Universal Manual of Ready Reference (1904)
  - New Century Book of Facts (1909)
- Collier's New Encyclopedia (1902)
  - University Encyclopaedia of Twentieth Century Knowledge (1902)
- Encyclopedia Americana (1902)
- New International Encyclopedia (1902)
- Teacher's and Pupil's Cyclopaedia (1902)
  - Encyclopedic Current Reference (1906)
  - New Teacher's and Pupil's Cyclopaedia (1910)
  - Unrivaled Encyclopedia (1911)
  - Practical American Encyclopedia (1911)
  - International Reference Work (1923)
  - Progressive Reference Library (1928)
  - World Scope Encyclopedia (1945)
  - New World Family Encyclopedia (1953)
  - Standard International Encyclopedia (1953)
  - New American Encyclopedia (1964)
  - World University Encyclopedia (1964)
  - World Educator Encyclopedia (1964)

=== 1903 ===
- Crown Encyclopaedia and Gazetter (1903) (Link includes vols. 1 and 5)
  - Continental Encyclopedia (1905)
  - New Century Reference Library (1907) (Link includes vols. 2-8)
  - Current Cyclopedia of Reference (1909)
  - Everybody's Encyclopedia (1910)
  - People's Encyclopedia (1914)
  - New World Wide Encyclopedia (1918)
  - World Wide Encyclopedia (1919)
  - New World Encyclopedia (1919) (Link includes vol. 1)
  - Adair's New Encyclopedia (1923) (Link includes vols. 2-5)
  - Time's Encyclopedia and Gazetteer (1929)
  - Twentieth Century Encyclopedia (1930)
  - Worlds Popular Encyclopedia (1937)
- Imperial Encyclopedia and Dictionary (1903), a continuation of Columbian Cyclopaedia (1899)
  - New Imperial Encyclopedia and Dictionary (1906)
  - United Editors Encyclopedia and Dictionary (1909)
  - United Editors Perpetual Encyclopedia (1911)
- New People's Cyclopedia of Universal Knowledge (1903) (Link includes vols. 1-4) re-issue of People's Cyclopedia of Universal Knowledge (1883)
  - World Wide Encyclopedia and Gazetteer (1908)
- Twentieth Century Household Library (1903)

=== 1904 ===
- Cassells Cabinet Cyclopedia (1904)
- Complete Library of Universal Knowledge (1904)
  - New Idea Self-Instructor (1904)
  - The Knowledge Book (1915)
  - The Knowledge Library (1918)
  - New Knowledge Library (1919)
- Modern Achievement (1904)

=== 1905 ===
- Everybody's Everyday Reference Book for Home and Office (1905)
  - Pannell's Reference Book for Home and Office (1905)
  - Jack's Reference Book for Home and Office (1908)
- Everett's encyclopedia of useful knowledge (1905)
  - Columbia Encyclopedia of Useful Knowledge (1907)
  - American Home Encyclopedia of Useful Knowledge (1908)

=== 1906 ===
- Nelson's Encyclopaedia (1906)
  - Harmsworth's Encyclopaedia (1906) British edition
  - Nelson's Perpetual Loose Leaf Encyclopaedia (1913)
  - New Age Encyclopedia (1920)
  - Harmsworth's Universal Encyclopaedia (1920) British edition
    - Doubleday Encyclopedia (1931), American ed. based on above
    - Grolier Encyclopedia (1940)
    - Unified Encyclopedia (1960)
    - Concise Universal Encyclopedia (1930), a condensed British revision of Harmworth's Universal
    - Modern Encyclopedia (1933) British re-issue of the above
    - New Popular Educator (1933) British re-issue of the above
    - Casell's Modern Encyclopedia (1934) British re-issue of the above
    - Encyclopedia of Modern Knowledge (1936) British revision of Harmworth's Universal
    - New Universal Encyclopedia (1951)
  - Nelson's Complete Encyclopedia (1937)
  - Nelson's Encyclopaedia: Unabridged (1940)
  - Nelson's New Loose Leaf Encyclopaedia (1940)
  - Book of Knowledge (1959) British ed.
  - American People's Encyclopedia (1948)
- New Standard Encyclopedia (1906) May or may not have derived from Standard American Encyclopedia (1899)
  - Practical and Home Encyclopedia (1909)
  - Standard American Encyclopedia (1912)
  - International's World Reference Encyclopedia (1942)
  - Universal World Reference Encyclopedia (1945)

=== 1907 ===
- Everyone's Cyclopedia (1907)
- Library of Original Sources (1907)

=== 1908 ===
- The Children's Encyclopædia (1908)
  - Book of Knowledge (1912) American revision of the Children's Encyclopaedia
  - New Book of Knowledge (1966) later iteration of the Book of Knowledge
- Standard Dictionary of Facts (1908)

=== 1909 ===
- La Salle Extension University Encyclopedia (1909)
  - Everybody's Encyclopedia (1909)
  - Webster's Universal Encyclopedia (1909)
  - Modern Universal Encyclopedia (1910)
  - Home and Office Reference Book of Facts (1913)
- New Complete Condensed Encyclopedia (1909), a re-issue of Chandler's Encyclopedia (1898)
- Werner Encyclopedia (1909), a reprint of the 9th edition of the Britannica.
  - Anglo-American Encyclopedia (1911)
- Winston's Encyclopedia (1909)
  - Winston's Cumulative Loose Leaf Encyclopedia (1912)
  - Encyclopedia Library (1942)
  - American International Encyclopedia (1950)

== 1910s ==
=== 1910 ===
- Aiton's Encyclopedia (1910)
  - Standard Reference Work (1912)
  - National Encyclopedia for the Home, School and Library (1923)
  - New Standard Encyclopedia (1930)
  - Consolidated Encyclopedia (1939) Canadian ed.
- Appleton's New Practical Encyclopedia (1910)
  - New Universal Encyclopedia (1930)
- Routledge's Everyman's Encyclopedia (1910)

=== 1911 ===
- "Handy Cyclopedia of Things Worth Knowing". 1911.
- Volume Library (1911) (Returned to original title in 1970)
  - Cowles Comprehensive Encyclopedia: the Volume Library (1963)
  - Cowles Volume Library (1968)

=== 1912 ===
- Modern Encyclopedia (1912)
- Standard Illustrated Book of Facts (1912)

=== 1913 ===
- Funk and Wagnall's Standard Encyclopedia of the Worlds Knowledge (1913)
- Everyman's Encyclopaedia (1913-4)
  - Cambridge Encyclopedia (1934) Canadian ed.
  - Macmillan Everymans Encyclopedia (1958)
- Home and School Reference Work (1913)
  - Source Book (1924)
  - American Reference Library (c.1931). Other recorded names included National Encyclopedia, Perpetual Loose Leaf Encyclopedia and North American Reference Book
- New Encyclopedia (1913)

=== 1914 ===
- Human Interest Library (1914)
  - New Human Interest Library (1928)
- Our Wonder World (1914)
  - New Wonder World (1932)
  - New Wonder World Encyclopedia (1959)
  - New Wonder World Cultural Library (1962)
  - Cultural Library (1964)
- Stokes Complete One Volume Encyclopedia (1914)

=== 1916 ===
- "Circle of Knowledge". onlinebooks.library.upenn.edu. 1916.
- Pictured Knowledge 1916

=== 1917 ===
- World Book Encyclopedia (1917)

=== 1919 ===
- Bufton's Universal Cyclopedia (1919)
  - Library of Knowledge (1929)

== 1920s ==
=== 1920 ===
- Encyclopedia Americana (1920)
- New Universal Handbook of Necessary Information (1920)
  - Universal Handbook (1920s)
  - Winston Universal Reference Library (1930)
- Waverley New Era Encyclopedia (1920)
  - Waverley Encyclopedia of General Information (1930)

=== 1921 ===
- New Gresham Encyclopedia (1921-4)
  - Compact Encyclopedia (1927)
  - Concise Encyclopedia (1933) also referred to as the Collins Concise Encyclopedia
    - The British Encyclopedia (1933)
  - Collins Gem Encyclopedia (1979)
  - Running Press Encyclopedia (1993)

=== 1922 ===
- Compton's Encyclopedia (1922)
  - Book of Knowledge (1922) British ed. Returned to this title in 1959
    - Cassell's Book of Knowledge
    - Waverley Book of Knowledge
    - Hammerton Book of Knowledge
    - Wonderland of Knowledge (1933)
    - New Book of Knowledge (1938-1953)

=== 1924 ===
- Lincoln Library of Essential Information (1924)
  - Encyclopedia of World Knowledge (1969)
  - New Lincoln Library Encyclopedia (1978)
- Outline of Knowledge (1924) Link only goes to Vol. 1
  - New Outline of Knowledge (1936)

=== 1925 ===
- Concise Pocket Encyclopedia (1925)

=== 1927 ===
- Universal Knowledge (1927)

=== 1928 ===
- I See All (1928)
- New Universities Encyclopedia (1928)

=== 1929 ===
- Pocket Library of the Worlds Essential Information (1929)

== 1930s ==
=== 1930 ===
- American Home Library (1930)

=== 1931 ===
- Funk and Wagnall's New Standard Encyclopedia of Universal Knowledge (1931)
  - New Funk and Wagnall's Encyclopedia (1949)
  - Universal Standard Encyclopedia (1954)
  - Funk and Wagnall's Standard Reference Encyclopedia (1959)
  - Funk & Wagnalls New Encyclopedia (1971)
- Golden Pathway to Knowledge (1931)
- Hayward's Key to Knowledge (1931)
- An Outline of Modern Knowledge (1931)

=== 1932 ===
- National Encyclopedia (1932)
- Newnes Pictorial Encyclopedia (1932)
- New Standard Encyclopedia and World Atlas (1932)
  - Wonder World of Knowledge (1935)
  - Wonder World Encyclopedia (1936)
  - Standard Encyclopaedia (1937)
  - Modern Standard Encyclopedia (1938)
  - New Wonder World Encyclopedia (1964)

=== 1933 ===
- Modern Encyclopaedia (1933) 1 vol.
  - Concise Encyclopaedia (1937) 8 vols.
  - Modern Concise Encyclopaedia (1940) 12 vols.
  - New Modern Encyclopaedia (1943) 1 vol.
- Modern Encyclopedia for Children (1933)
  - Wonder Encyclopedia for Children (1933)
  - Golden Encyclopedia for Children (1934)
  - Clear Type Encyclopedia (1935)
  - Laural and Gold Encyclopedia (1935)
  - Modern Encyclopedia for Young People (1935)
  - Modern Illustrated Encyclopedia (1940)
- Newes Everything Within (1933)
  - Newnes Golden Treasury (1933)
  - Children's Everything Within (1939)
- New Illustrated Universal Reference Book (1933)
- Richards Cyclopedia (1933)
  - Richard's Topical Cyclopedia (1939)

=== 1934 ===
- Daily Express Encyclopedia (1934)
- Routledge's Universal Encyclopedia (1934) British ed.
  - Facts; the New Concise Encyclopedia (1934) American ed.
  - New Concise Pictorial Encyclopedia (1938)
  - Comprehensive Pictorial Encyclopedia (1942)
  - World Home Reference Encyclopedia (1951)
- Practical Knowledge for All (1934)

=== 1935 ===
- Columbia Encyclopedia (1935)
  - The Columbia Viking Desk Encyclopedia (1953)
  - New Columbia Encyclopedia (1975)
  - News Illustrated Columbia Encyclopedia (1978)
  - Concise Columbia Encyclopedia (1983)
- New Gem Encyclopedia (1935)
  - Encyclopedia of General Knowledge (1938)
- New York Post Illustrated Encyclopedia
  - World Wide Illustrated Encyclopedia (1937)
  - University Illustrated Encyclopedia (1938)
  - New American Encyclopedia (1938)
  - Home University Encyclopedia (1941)
  - Encyclopedic Library of Knowledge (1944)
  - Webster's Unified Encyclopedia and Dictionary (1953)
  - American Family Encyclopedia (1963)

=== 1936 ===
- Children's Home Educator and Treasury of Knowledge (1936)
  - Waverley Encyclopedia (1953)
- Everyday Knowledge (1936)
- Hutchinson's Pictorial Encyclopedia (1936)
  - Hutchinson's Twentieth Century Encyclopedia (1948)
  - Hutchinson's New Twentieth Century Encyclopedia (1965)
  - New Hutchinson's Twentieth Century Encyclopedia (1977)
- International Encyclopedia and Dictionary (1936)

=== 1937 ===
- Everybody's Enquire Within (1937)
- University of Knowledge (1937)
- Wonderland of Knowledge (1937)

=== 1938 ===
- Book of General Knowledge (1938)
  - Teach Yourself Concise Encyclopedia of General Knowledge (1956)
- Universal Knowledge A - Z (1938)
  - Great Encyclopedia of Universal Knowledge (1948)

== 1940s ==
=== 1940 ===
- Modern Library of Knowledge (1940)
- Webster's Columbia Encyclopedic Dictionary (1940)
  - Webster's Comprehensive Encyclopedic Dictionary (1941)
  - Webster's Encyclopedic Dictionary (1941)
  - Library of Essential Information (1942)
  - American People's Encyclopedia (1946)
  - Consolidated Webster Comprehensive Encyclopedic Dictionary (1954)
  - Consolidated Webster Encyclopedic Dictionary (1954)

=== 1943 ===
- International American Encyclopedia (1943)

=== 1944 ===
- Encyclopedia for Boys and Girls (1944)
  - Children's Illustrated Encyclopedia of General Knowledge (1957)

=== 1946 ===
- Golden Encyclopedia (1946)
  - New Golden Encyclopedia (1963)
- Handy Encyclopedia of Useful Information (1946)
  - Austin's New Encyclopedia of Useable Information (1948)
  - Everyday Reference Library (1951)

=== 1947 ===
- Information Please Almanac (1947)

=== 1948 ===
- Children's Pictorial Encyclopedia (1948)
- Oxford Junior Encyclopedia (1948)
  - American Oxford Encyclopedia for Home and School (1964)
- World of the Children (1948)
  - Caxton Encyclopedia (1960)
  - Caxton World of Knowledge (1961)
  - New World Library (1964)

=== 1949 ===
- Children's Guide to Knowledge (1949) British version
- Collier's Encyclopedia (1949 - 1951)

== 1950s ==
=== 1953 ===
- Odham's Encyclopedia (1953)
  - Modern Encyclopedia (1961)

=== 1954 ===
- Basic Everyday Encyclopedia (1954)
- Illustrated Encyclopedia of Knowledge (1954)
  - Illustrated Home Library Encyclopedia (1955)
  - Illustrated World Encyclopedia (1958)
- New Pictorial Encyclopedia of the World (1954)
  - Illustrated Encyclopedia of the Modern World (1956)
  - Little & Ives Illustrated Ready Reference Encyclopedia (1961)
- New Wonder Book Cyclopedia of World Knowledge (1954)

=== 1955 ===
- New Masters Pictorial Encyclopedia (1955)
- Our Wonderful World (1955)

=== 1956 ===
- Wonder Book Encyclopedia (1956)
  - Junior Pictorial Encyclopedia (1959)
  - Encyclopedia of Modern Knowledge (1965)
- Young Children's Encyclopedia (1956)

=== 1957 ===
- Children's Guide to Knowledge (1957) American version
- Modern Children's Library of Knowledge (1957)
- Modern University Encyclopedia (1957)
  - New Age Encyclopedia, World Atlas and Sports Supplement (1957)
- Pearson's Everything Within (1957)
- Pictorial Encyclopedia (1957)

=== 1959 ===
- Children's Encyclopaedia (1959)
- Funk and Wagnall's New Standard Encyclopedia of Universal Knowledge (1959) a 1 vol. condensation of Funk and Wagnell's Standard Reference Encyclopedia
- Golden Book Encyclopedia (1959)
- Illustrated Encyclopedia (1959)

== 1960s ==
=== 1960 ===
- Junior World Encyclopedia (1960)
  - Harver Junior World Encyclopedia (1972)
- Newnes Popular Encyclopedia (1960)
  - Newnes Family Encyclopedia (1966)

=== 1961 ===
- Black's Children Encyclopedia (1961)
- Golden Home and High School Encyclopedia (1961)
- Golden Treasury of Knowledge (1961)
- Junior Pears Encyclopedia (1961)
- Knowledge: the weekly colored encyclopedia (1961 - 1965)
  - New Knowledge (1965)
- Odham's Encyclopedia for Children (1961)
  - Odham's Wonder World of Knowledge (1961)

=== 1963 ===
- Encyclopedia International (1963-4)
  - Grolier Universal Encyclopedia (1965)

=== 1964 ===
- Child's First Encyclopedia (1964)
- Complete Reference Handbook (1964)
  - Quick Reference Encyclopedia (1976)
  - Quick Reference Handbook of Basic Knowledge (1979)

=== 1965 ===
- Catholic Encyclopedia for School and Home (1965)
- The Penguin Encyclopedia (1965)

=== 1966 ===
- Purnell's New English Encyclopedia (1966)
  - New Caxton Encyclopedia (1966)

=== 1967 ===
- World Wide Encyclopedia (1967)
- Merit Students Encyclopedia (1967)

=== 1968 ===
- Longmans English Larousse (1968)

== 1970s ==
=== 1971 ===
- Compton's Young Children's Precyclopedia (1971)
  - Comton's Precyclopedia (1973)
- Talking Cassette Encyclopedia (1971)
  - New Talking Cassette Encyclopedia (1984)

=== 1972 ===
- Young Student's Encyclopedia (1972)

=== 1973 ===
- Cadillac Modern Encyclopedia (1973)
  - Kussmaul Encyclopedia (1981)
- Disney's Wonderful World of Knowledge (1973)
- Harver World Encyclopedia (1973)

=== 1976 ===
- Ward Lock Children's Encyclopedia (1976)
  - Rand McNally's Children's Encyclopedia (1976)

=== 1977 ===
- The Random House Encyclopedia (1977)
- University Desk Encyclopedia (1977)
  - Concord Desk Encyclopedia (1981)

=== 1978 ===
- Junior Encyclopedia of General Knowledge (1978)
- The Concise Encyclopedia of Science & Technology (1978)

=== 1979 ===
- Knowledge Encyclopedia (1979)
- Purnell's Pictorial Encyclopedia (1979)

== 1980s ==
=== 1980 ===
- Academic American Encyclopedia (1980)
  - Barnes & Noble New American Encyclopedia (1991)
- Charlie Brown's 'Cyclopedia (1980)
- Finding Out: Silver Burdett's Children's Encyclopedia (1980)
- Nelson's Encyclopedia for Young Readers (1980)

=== 1981 ===
- Macmillan Encyclopedia (1981)
  - New Universal Family Encyclopedia (1985)
- New Knowledge Library (1981)

=== 1985 ===
- Oxford Illustrated Encyclopedia (1985)

== 1990s ==
=== 1991 ===
- American Spectrum Encyclopedia (1991)

=== 1993 ===
- Encarta (1993)

== Britannica ==
- Tenth edition (supplement to the 9th) (1903)
- 11th edition of the Encyclopaedia Britannica (1910-1)
- Twelfth edition (1922) a 3-volume supplement to the eleventh edition was released that summarized the developments just before, during and after World War I; these three volumes, taken together with the eleventh edition of 1910, became known as the twelfth edition.
- These eventful years; the twentieth century in the making, as told by many of its makers; being the dramatic story of all that has happened throughout the world during the most momentous period in all history, (1924)
- Thirteenth edition (1926) three new volumes covering the history of 1910–1926, which were intended to supplant those of the twelfth edition. Again taken together with the eleventh edition, the new volumes became known as the thirteenth edition.
- Fourteenth edition (1929) after this the Britannica began a policy of continuous revision.
- 10 Eventful Years (1947) a special supplement on 1937-1947 - the Second World War, as well as the years immediately preceding it and following it.
- Fifteenth edition, first version, other wise known as the New Encyclopædia Britannica (1974) this began the change of format into Propædia, Micropædia, and Macropædia, as well as eschewing an index.
- Fifteenth edition, second version (1985) restored the index as a two volume supplement, streamlined the three type format for easier use.
- Encyclopædia Britannica Ultimate Reference Suite (2004)
- Britannica Global Edition (2010)

=== Other English language Britannica publications ===
- The Historians' History of the World (1902)
- The reader's guide to the Encyclopædia britannica; a handbook containing sixty-six courses of systematic study or occasional reading. (1913)
- Britannica Book of the Year (1913, 1938-)
- The Britannica book of the war (1914)
- Britannica Home University (1920)
- Weedon's Modern Encyclopedia (1931) a non-Britannica publication that was bought out and repackaged by Britannica as
  - Britannica Junior (1934)
- Great Books of the Western World (1952)
- Children's Britannica (1960) aimed at ages seven to 14.
- Gateway to the Great Books (1963)
- Young Children's Encyclopaedia (1970) for children just learning to read
- My First Britannica (1974) aimed at children ages six to 12
- Britannica Discovery Library (1974) for children aged three to six

== See also ==
- History of the Encyclopædia Britannica
