= Book of Knowledge (disambiguation) =

Book of Knowledge is a topical children's encyclopedia first published in 1912.

Book of Knowledge may also refer to:

- Book of Knowledge of All Kingdoms a 14th-century Catalan armorial
- The New Book of Knowledge, successor to the Book of Knowledge, an alphabetic encyclopedia first published in 1966
- Cassell's Book of Knowledge
- One of the later editions of the Harmsworth's Universal Encyclopaedia
- The Knowledge: How to Rebuild Our World from Scratch, a non-fiction book by Lewis Dartnell

== See also ==
- The Children's Encyclopædia which was the originator of the 1912 encyclopedia
