= Volume Library =

Compact encyclopedia

The Volume Library was a one-volume general encyclopedic reference work that was published from 1911 to 1985. It remained as a two or three volume reference work until at least 2004.

The publication began in 1911 by W. E. Richardson of Chicago. It was edited by Henry Woldmar Ruoff who also edited the New Century Book of Facts and the Standard Dictionary of Facts and others. New editions were published in 1912 and 1913, the latter under the imprint of R. P. Trosper. Beginning with the 1917 edition it was published by the Education Associates, Inc. and remained with that company until 1963 when the encyclopedia was purchased by Cowles Communications Inc.

From 1963 the set was titled Cowles Comprehensive Encyclopedia - the Volume Library. Under Cowles the work was said to be "extensively revised and vastly improved". In 1968 the title was changed again to Cowles Volume Library and was changed back to Volume Library in 1970, after having been acquired by the Southwestern Company of Nashville, Tennessee. It expanded to 2 volumes in 1985.

The 1985 edition had 2,650 pages, 8,500 articles and 3.5 million words. The set included 2,000 illustrations, mostly in black and white, and 200 maps, included a 64-page world atlas at the end of Vol. 2. The articles were of the broad entry type, each about 400 pages or one third of a page. 300 contributors were listed at the beginning of Vol. 1 and 75 percent of the articles were signed. The encyclopedia was topically arranged and contained 500 cross references, with an index of 50,000 entries. The encyclopedia was criticized in the 1970s and 1980s for being out of date and having a conservative bias. In the 1985 edition, subjects such as abortion, homosexuality, AIDS and birth control were hardly mentioned, if at all. It was also criticized for using sexist language. Factual errors and outdated information were also reported, though extensive revisions to correct these took place in the mid-1980s, when the encyclopedia was converted to a two volume format.

In the 1980s Southwestern contracted with the Hudson Group, Inc. to revise the set. Under chief editor Gorton Carruth the quality of the encyclopedia improved dramatically and by 1994 the set was "as accurate as could be expected of a work of more than two million words". The set still had some limitations, not discussing or discussing very briefly topics such as abortion, sexual harassment or circumcision. It also lacked biographical entries for people such as Maya Angelou, Toni Morrison, Philip Glass and Charles Drew.

In terms of format, the 1994 version had 2,568 pages, 2.5 million words and 3,000 maps and illustrations, 95 per cent of which were in black and white. The set had 8,500 articles with 100 bibliographies. Carruth was supported by a staff of 106 contributors, whose names, areas of responsibility, degrees and affiliation were listed at the beginning of each volume. There were 300 cross-references but these only cross-referenced within each topical area's "volume". There was also an index of 30,000 entries. Articles were arranged topically under headings such as "Animals", "Computers", "Government and Law" etc. The set contained much practical advice, including how to write a resume, follow the stock market, save energy, conduct a self breast examination and "Do's and Don'ts of Pregnancy". There was also an optional supplementary third volume which contained information for taking standardized tests and a full color world atlas. The physical format now included thumb indexes with fore-edges showing where each topical chapter began.

== See also ==
- Lincoln Library of Essential Information
