= British Encyclopaedia =

There have been a number of encyclopedia sets named British Encyclopedia, British Encyclopaedia or British Encyclopædia.

- British Encyclopaedia, or Dictionary of Arts and Sciences, published in 1809
- The British Encyclopedia (Collins Concise Encyclopaedia), published in 1933

== See also ==
- Encyclopædia Britannica
- British Cyclopaedia
