= Clement Price Thomas =

Welsh surgeon

Sir Clement Price Thomas KCVO MRCS LRCP FRCS FRCP
- Price Thomas c. 1951
- Born: 22 November 1893; Abercarn, Monmouthshire, Wales
- Died: 19 March 1973 (aged 79); Midhurst, Sussex, England
- Burial place: New Bethel Chapel Cemetery, Mynyddislwyn
- Education: Caterham School
- Alma mater: Cardiff University; Westminster Hospital Medical School
- Occupation: Thoracic surgeon
- Years active: 1927–1973
- Employer: Cardiff University School of Medicine
- Known for: Lung Surgery
- Notable work: Lung operation on George VI in 1951
- Spouse: Ethel Doris Ricks (m. 1925)
- Children: 2
- Awards: Knight Commander of the Royal Victorian Order

Sir Clement Price Thomas KCVO MRCS LRCP FRCS FRCP (22 November 1893 – 19 March 1973) was a pioneering Welsh thoracic surgeon most famous for his 1951 operation on King George VI.

Following a scholarship to Westminster Hospital Medical School, Price Thomas was posted to the Middle East at the onset of the First World War. He resumed his surgical training on return and was ultimately elected on to the surgical team of the hospital.

Encouraged to pursue thoracic surgery by Tudor Edwards, Price Thomas took up, along with other posts, a thoracic surgery placement at the Royal Brompton Hospital, a specialist hospital for chest diseases. His reputation from his work on surgical techniques in pulmonary tuberculosis led to the decision that he would undertake the lung surgery on King George VI in 1951. Its success resulted in Price Thomas being appointed Knight Commander of the Royal Victorian Order (KCVO).

Price Thomas was elected as president to numerous significant bodies during his career, including, the British Medical Association, the Royal Society of Medicine, the Association of Thoracic Surgeons, the Thoracic Society and the Welsh National School of Medicine. A forerunner of thoracic surgery on the international platform, he delivered a number of eponymous lectures and received several honorary degrees.

Price Thomas, less well known for his cardiac surgery, also introduced surgery for coarctation of the aorta to the United Kingdom, a procedure he learnt from Clarence Crafoord.

He suffered from lung cancer in his later years, he was a lifelong cigarette smoker, and died at the age of 79 years, leaving a wife and two sons, one of whom became a surgeon.

== Early life ==
Clement Price Thomas was born in Abercarn, Monmouthshire. He was the youngest child of a family of nine children and they lived on Islwyn Street. His father William Thomas was a grocer and his mother, Rosamund Gertrude Price, was a clergyman's daughter. He attended Newport High School before going to Caterham School at the age of 13 years, a boarding school in Surrey. He then proceeded to the University College of South Wales and Monmouthshire.

Price Thomas was awarded the Hughes Medal in anatomy whilst he was a student at Cardiff Medical School. Although his ambition was initially to enter dental surgery, he was subsequently awarded a scholarship to study medicine at the Westminster Hospital Medical School.

Between 1914 and 1918, Price Thomas was posted to the Middle East, specifically Gallipoli, Macedonia and Palestine. He went as a private in the 32nd Field Ambulance, Royal Army Medical Corps.

== Medical career ==
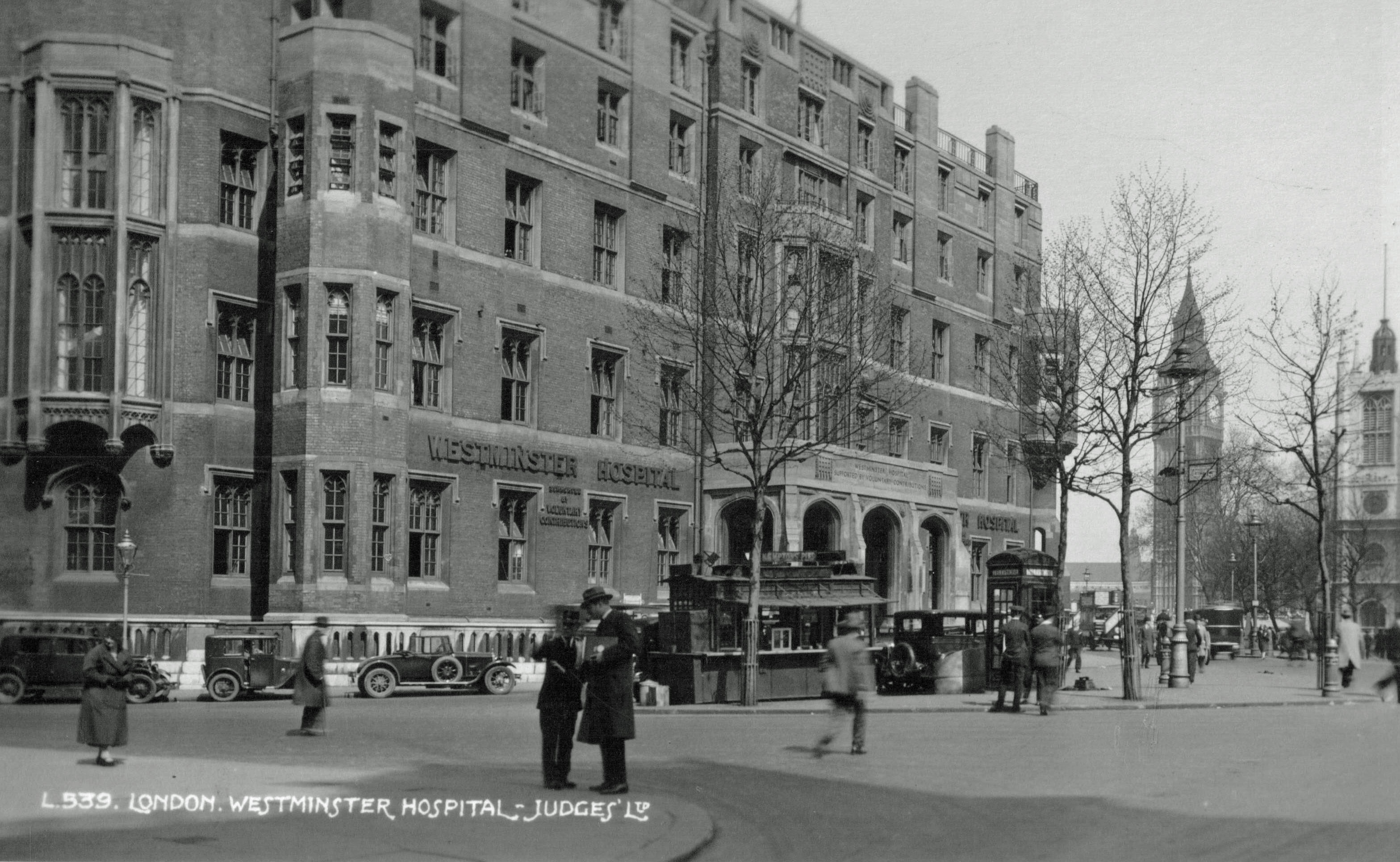
Westminster Hospital in the mid-1920s. The hospital was demolished in the early 1950s, this is now the site of the Queen Elizabeth II Conference Centre.

In 1921, after the war, Price Thomas achieved the Conjoint Board Diploma, LRCP and then in 1923, attained the FRCS (Eng). At the time, he continued to gain clinical experience at Westminster Hospital with his residential appointments and was sequentially kept as a permanent member of the clinical team there. He was introduced to thoracic surgery by Tudor Edwards, an eminent thoracic surgeon of the time, and was similarly influenced by Ernest Rock Carling and G. T. Mullally. In addition, encouragement in chest surgery came from J. E. H. Roberts, and Morriston Davies.

As well as his responsibilities at the Westminster Hospital, Price Thomas remained the predominant chest surgeon at the Brompton Hospital. He also attended to the Army and the Royal Air Force as a consultant in thoracic surgery. He became a consultant at the King Edward VII Sanatorium, Midhurst, and at the Royal National Hospital for Diseases of the Chest, Ventnor. In addition, he had responsibilities at the Welsh National Memorial Association South Wales. Through his contacts and reputation, he became an advisor to thoracic surgery for the Ministry of Health.

Price Thomas had been appointed Tudor Edwards's assistant surgeon in 1932 and they performed the first case of lobectomy of the lung for bronchiectasis the same year. This was the start of a, particularly close friendship over many years. It was inevitable that Price Thomas should comfortably fit into Tudor Edwards's position in thoracic surgery at Westminster hospital once Edwards resigned. Later, during a Tudor Edwards memorial lecture, Sir Russell Brock, Baron Brock commented that no-one knew Tudor Edwards better than Price Thomas.

Price Thomas was predominantly known to operate on tuberculosis and lung tumours. He was the first surgeon to do a bronchial sleeve resection, in 1947: the operation involved removing a bronchial carcinoid tumour. Price Thomas went on to show how a bronchial blockage from tuberculosis could be resected and the two ends of the bronchus could be sewn together, uniting in a similar way as two ends of intestine. He had his own rationale for collapse therapy of the lung and specifically of selective partial thoracoplasty with apicolysis in the treatment of tuberculosis. He was also considered to be fortunate to have one of the best anaesthetists to assist, Ivan Magill.

== Academic contributions ==
From 1948 to 1952 he was affiliated with the Court of Examiners for the Royal College of Surgeons (RCS). He became vice-president of the RCS between 1962 and 1964, after contributing to its council since 1952.

In 1958, he was the third Tudor Edwards Memorial lecturer and in 1960 and 1963, Vicary Lecturer and Bradshaw lecturer respectively.

Price Thomas was president of several medical organisations including the Association of Surgeons of Great Britain and Ireland, the Society of Thoracic Surgeons, the Royal Society of Medicine, the British Medical Association and the Welsh National School of Medicine. He was a valuable expert counsellor, being president of the Medical Protection Society for many years. He was a founder president of the medical council on alcoholism.

He was awarded honorary degrees by the universities of Wales, Belfast, Paris, Lisbon, Athens and Karachi.

He was elected to the Welsh National School of Medicine's president, a position he held between 1958 and 1970.

Price Thomas was a notable medical educator and facilitated weekly surgical conferences at the Brompton and continuing small group teaching.

== King George VI lung operation ==
Price Thomas led the team that removed a cancerous left lung from King George VI. His Times obituary noted that despite his huge fame and international reputation "the more honours that befell him, the more did his innate modesty came to the fore".

The king had been unwell in 1951, and was advised by his physicians Sir Daniel Davies, Sir Horace Evans, Geoffrey Marshall and Sir John Weir, to return to London from Balmoral and confine himself to his room. He was described as having 'catarrhal inflammation', and rest may improve it. However, he did not improve and was considerably weak, thin and pale with little exercise tolerance due to intermittent claudication. A series of X-rays were reviewed which, reported by Peter Kerley, a Westminster Hospital radiologist, suggested a tumour, and after Sir Horace Evans consulted Price Thomas, a bronchoscopy was scheduled. The bronchoscopy and biopsy were performed on 16 September, transported to the Brompton hospital by Price Thomas's son, Brian, and the result confirmed a lung tumor. The diagnosis was concealed from the king, who had the surgery with the understanding it was to remove a lung blockage. The public was not informed as to the King's health problems.

On Sunday morning, 23 September 1951, the operation on the king's lung was performed by Price Thomas and his assistants Charles Edwin Drew and Peter Jones in the Buhl Room of Buckingham Palace. Even the changing the King's guard was switched to St James's Palace to avoid disturbance outside the operating theatre, where it would have otherwise taken place. Attempting to perform the surgery in their routine manner whereby the assistants sewed up the wound following removal of the tumour, Price Thomas is recalled to have remarked "I haven't stitched up a chest for 25 years and I'm not going to start practising today!" Following surgery, the king was moved back into his own bedroom.

Despite injury to the left recurrent laryngeal nerve and an effect on the king's voice, the cancerous lung was successfully removed. Price Thomas declined the fee for the surgery, considering it an honour to have been of service to his king. The king honoured him with the KCVO, in December 1951, barely two months before he died from the effects of arterial disease.

== Family life ==
In 1925, Price Thomas married Ethel Doris, whose father was Mortimer Ricks from Paignton in South Devon. He had interests in golf, photography and reading. His son Martyn Price Thomas FRCS (1935–2000) was also a surgeon.

Price Thomas lived in St John's Wood, was very welcoming and deeply religious. He was also dedicated to his wife and sons. He had numerous nicknames including 'Clem', 'CP' and 'Pricey'. Often people would be unsure as to how to address him.

He retained his Welsh accent as well as his Welsh patriotism.

== Later life ==
Price Thomas was also well known for heart surgery. He had been involved with the first resection of coarctation of the aorta in 1946, with Clarence Crafoord. As cardiac surgery expanded and became more complex in the 1950s, he decided to leave it to his junior colleagues. Charles Drew went on to research hypothermia and cardiac surgery, whilst Peter Jones carried on with thoracic surgery.

Price Thomas was a chain-smoker himself, carrying at least 50 cigarettes in his pocket, and consequently, he suffered from lung cancer. His caricature in Ellis's Operations that made history, 1996, shows a suited Price Thomas with numerous cigarette stubs at his feet. In 1964, Price Thomas underwent a lobectomy for lung cancer, performed by the same surgeon (Charles Drew) who had assisted him in the King's operation in 1951.

Despite his ill-health, he remained actively involved in his presidential projects. As president of the Welsh National School of Medicine, Price Thomas remained active in matters of medical education and the school progressed under his leadership. He continued to attend council meetings and ceremonies. In 1965 he laid the foundation stone of a large medical teaching centre in Heath Park, which is situated in the north of Cardiff. This centre incorporated the University Hospital of Wales, a new dental school and hospital and also the Tenovus Institute for Cancer Research.

Price Thomas died at the age of 79 years, on 19 March 1973.

He was buried in New Bethel Chapel cemetery, Mynyddislwyn, where his parents were buried. A memorial service was held in Westminster Abbey on 29 May 1973.

== Honours ==
For his work within the medical community Price Thomas received numerous decorations and honorary appointments. In 1951, Price Thomas was appointed a Knight Commander of the Royal Victorian Order after operating successfully on King George VI.

=== National Honours ===
- Knight Commander of the Royal Victorian Order (1951)

=== Medical Honours ===
- Honorary Legum Doctor Wales (1953)
- Honorary Doctor of Medicine Paris (1954)
- Honorary Doctor of Medicine Paris (1956)
- Honorary Legum Doctor Belfast (1962)
- Honorary Doctor of Medicine Lisbon (1964)
- Honorary Doctor of Medicine Karachi (1966)
- Honorary Doctor of Medicine Athens (1970)
- Honorary Fellow of the American College of Surgeons (FACS) - 1954
- Honorary Fellow of the Royal College of Surgeons in Ireland (FRCSI)
- Honorary Fellow of Royal College of Surgeons of Edinburgh (FRCSE)

== Legacy ==
=== Price Thomas Travelling Fellowship ===
Price Thomas was the third president of the Travelling Surgical Club, as it was known from 1952 to 1972. Now known as the Travelling Surgical Society of Great Britain, the Price Thomas Travelling Fellowship was established in the memory of Price Thomas and his surgeon son Martyn. Two bursaries are awarded annually to inspire education and encourage surgical exchanges.

=== Memorabilia of The King's Surgery ===
The operating table is on display at Westminster Hospital, while Cyril F. Scurr donated the ECG machine to the British Oxygen Company Museum at the Association of Anaesthetists of Great Britain.

=== Film and television ===
Price Thomas will be remembered for the thoracotomy on King George VI, which was re-enacted in Stephen Daldry's TV series The Crown in 2016. The highly realistic and accurate model of the king complete with surgical incisions was donated to the Gordon Museum of Pathology as an educational aid. The controversies over the cause of the king's death were also touched on in the 2010 film The King's Speech.
