= Tudor Edwards =

Welsh thoracic surgeon

Tudor Edwards M.Ch., FRCS
- Arthur Tudor Edwards as photographed by Howard Coster
- Born: Arthur Tudor Edwards; 7 March 1890
- Died: 25 August 1946 (aged 56)
- Education: St John's College, Cambridge
- Occupation: surgeon
- Known for: Thoracic surgery on: pulmonary tuberculosis; lung tumours
- Relatives: wife, Evelyn Imelda Chichester Hoskin
- Medical career
- Institutions: Westminster Hospital; Royal Brompton Hospital; Queen Mary's Hospital, Roehampton

Arthur Tudor Edwards (7 March 1890 – 25 August 1946) was a Welsh thoracic surgeon, who worked at the Westminster Hospital, the Royal Brompton Hospital and Queen Mary's Hospital, Roehampton and pioneered lung surgery, in particularly pulmonary tuberculosis and lung tumours.

Edwards was born in Swansea on 7 March 1890, the elder son of William Edwards and his wife Mary Griffith Thomas. He was educated at Mill Hill School, London, St John's College, Cambridge, and at Middlesex Hospital, London, where he qualified as a doctor in 1913. He was appointed house surgeon and surgical registrar at the Middlesex, and obtained the higher degrees of M.Ch. and FRCS in 1915.

Edwards was commissioned in the Royal Army Medical Corps in World War I, rising to the rank of major. He was the first Director of the Department of Thoracic Surgery at the London Hospital.

He was also responsible for the training of notable surgeons including Dwight Harken, Sir Clement Price Thomas and Sir Russell Brock.

== Early life ==
Tudor Edwards was born in Swansea on 7 March 1890, the elder son of William Edwards of Langlands, Glamorgan, Chairman of Edwards Limited and Mary Griffith Thomas. He attended Mill Hill school in London. Following studies at St John's College, Cambridge, he achieved a place in medical training at the Middlesex Hospital, was awarded a university scholarship and was appointed as a dresser (assistant) and house-surgeon to Sir Gordon Gordon-Taylor. Sir John Bland-Sutton was also senior surgeon at the Middlesex at this time.

== Surgical career ==
=== World war I ===
At the outbreak of World War I Edwards was assigned to the Royal Army Medical Corps where he worked and reached the rank of major in France, at No 6 casualty clearing station at Barlin under Sir Cuthbert Sidney Wallace, and at Wimereux under Major Meurice Sinclair. His evolving new surgical practices in war victims left a vast impression on military medicine. Later, his obituary commented that "the gods gave him good teachers and the casualties of a crippling war extensive experience".

=== Interwar years ===
On return, he took post as assistant surgeon to Gordon-taylor at the Westminster Hospital and surgeon to the Brompton Hospital for diseases of the chest where he was assisted by Price Thomas.

The interwar years were occupied with pioneering intense surgery. The treatment of war injuries, taught by surgeons Pierre Delbet and G E Gask, were applied to peacetime diseases. He investigated sequentially the surgery of pulmonary tuberculosis, bronchiectasis and lung tumours, and within 10-years, with the backing of his colleague physician R. A. Young and his anaesthetist Ivan MagillI, became renowned in the establishment of thoracic surgery. He was also for many years surgeon to Queen Mary's Hospital, Roehampton where many war pensioners were treated. Here, he operated on gastro-jejunal ulceration and gastro-oesopgaeal fistulae.

On resuming work in London, he became assistant surgeon to Westminster Hospital, and to the Brompton Hospital. In 1936, he stood appointed as first director of the Department of Thoracic Surgery at the London Hospital. This meant giving up general surgery at the Westminster Hospital. He remained a consulting surgeon to King Edward VII's Sanatorium at Midhurst and to Queen Alexandra's Hospital, Millbank. As surgeon under the Ministry of Pensions to Queen Mary's Hospital, Roehampton he accomplished valuable work in the restoration of the aftermath of war-time gastric operations. He also oversaw the London County Council's Thoracic Clinic at St Mary Abbott's Hospital, Kensington.

=== World War II ===
Between 1938 and 1939, Edwards suffered two severe illnesses, following which he continued as a civilian consultant with the Royal Air Force, adviser for thoracic casualties to the Ministry of Health, and civilian adviser to the War Office throughout WW2. He structured the response facilities for thoracic casualties under the Emergency Medical Service. Instituting a school of thoracic surgeons in Great Britain, he became a leading mentor. During the years of war he provided intensive courses of instruction for service thoracic units, and was attentive in visiting these units all over the country.

Despite serving numerous hospitals, the Brompton hospital was distinctly Edward's most desirable place to operate. Here, in one day, he would complete an outpatient clinic, an extensive ward, round followed by up to eight major lung and heart operations. Described as "a tiger for work, seemingly untiring and unaware that he might be tiring others", he was assisted at the Brompton by Price Thomas and anaesthetist Ivan Magill. The number of heart and lung operations at the Brompton rose from 49 in 1908 to 252 in 1928 and 1054 in 1938.

=== Post World War II ===
He was elected to the council of the college in 1943, but died before he had completed three years as a councillor. On the international platform in his forties, Edwards became an honorary fellow of the American Society of Thoracic Surgeons, and president of the Society of Thoracic Surgeons at home. In the ultimate years of his life, he was nominated the first president of the new Association for the Study of Diseases of the Chest and contributed a survey of one thousand operations for bronchial carcinoma to the first number of its journal Thorax.

== Family ==
Edwards married Evelyn Imelda Chichester Hoskin, daughter of Theophilus Hoskin, MRCS, of London and Cornwall on 13 April 1920. They did not have children.

== Personality ==
A shy and private person, sometimes seen as cold and arrogant, Edwards was feared amongst juniors. Brock had declared himself to be "much junior to him so could not necessarily expect a warm friendliness but it was rare to see him warm and friendly although he could be so".

== Later life ==
On 25 August 1946, Edwards was spending his holiday in St Enodoc, Cornwall. Known to be recurrently unwell, his sudden death was still felt as a surprise. He was 56 years old.

He was buried at St Enodoc's Church. Lord Horder delivered an obituary oration at a memorial service in London.

Mrs Edwards died five years later on 13 May 1951, and left £5,000 to the College for the promotion of surgical science.

== Legacy ==
Numerous students and trainees have trained under Edwards. Dwight Harken from the USA, took up a visiting fellows post with Tudor Edwards in 1942 later, ironically competing with another trainee, Sir Russell Brock. Edwards was the inspiration for Clement Price Thomas, the surgeon who performed the thoracotomy on King George VI in 1951. He was known as the "operator of supreme skill and beautiful technique".

In 1948, his colleagues organised a memorial fund to endow a lecture in his memory. Administered by both the Royal College of physicians and Royal College of Surgeons, the lecture is an honour to give. Past speakers have included Geoffrey Marshall, Sir Clement Price Thomas and Sir Russell Brock.
