= Source Book =

U.S. encyclopedias published from the 1910s through 1936

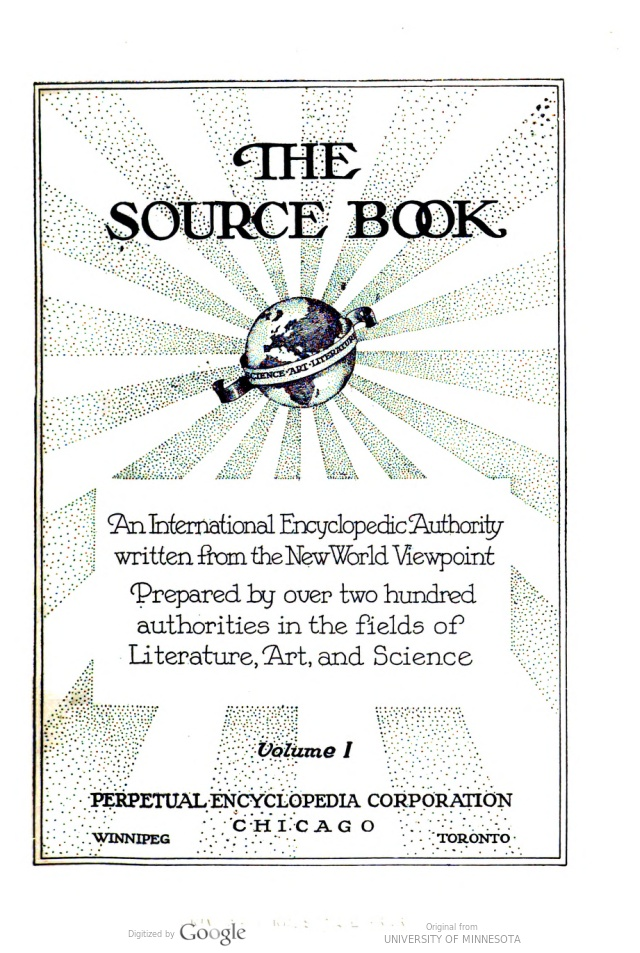
- Genre: Encyclopedia
- Publisher: Perpetual Encycolpedia Corporation

Source Book was the most common name for a family of American encyclopedias published from the 1910s through 1936.

Work began on the original project around 1910, when publisher H. N. Dixon commission editor William Francis Rocheleau to begin work on a new encyclopedia. Both of them had worked on the earlier Hill's Practical Reference Library, published in 1902 by Dixon and Hansen, Dixon as publisher and Rocheleau as "Revision editor".

Their new encyclopedia, Home and School Reference Work, was published in 1913 in 6 volumes under the imprint of the Dixon and Rucker Company. The work was considered poor by the standards of the time. The first five volumes contained encyclopedic material and the last was "Course of Study, Methods and Index". An expanded version was published in 1915 in 7 volumes, the last, again, being a study guide.

In 1922 the rights to the encyclopedia were sold to the Perpetual Encyclopedia Corporation who thoroughly revised the set and republished it in 1924 as the Source Book; an international encyclopedic authority written from the new world viewpoint. In this edition the first seven volumes were encyclopedic and the final three were study guides. The title was apparently chosen to capitalize on the success of the World Book Encyclopedia. Nevertheless, it was reportedly a "very poor work".

While publishing Source Book, the corporation also made contracts with numerous distributors and jobbers around the country and these entities sold the Source Book under a variety of names including Home and School Reference Work, American Reference Library, the North American Reference Work and others. This led to a cease and desist order from the Federal Trade Commission in 1929 (Docket#1371). Further cease and desist order would come in 1931 (Docket #1551) and 1932 (Docket #1371). In the first instance, the Co-operative Book Company was found to be selling the set as the American Reference Library until 1927, and then selling it as the Source Book. In the latter case the Perpetual Encyclopedia Corporation and others were taken to task for selling American Reference Library as a recent work, when in fact it was published as far back as 1913. Other labels apparently included the National Encyclopedia and Perpetual Loose-Leaf Encyclopedia Further editions under the Source Book title were copyrighted in 1930, 1932, 1935 and 1936.
