= Dwight Harken =

American heart surgeon

Dwight Emary Harken
- Born: June 5, 1910; Osceola, Iowa, United States
- Died: August 27, 1993 (aged 83); Cambridge, Massachusetts, United States
- Education: Harvard University
- Occupation: heart surgeon
- Spouse: Anne (m. 1934)
- Children: Alden, Anne

Dwight Emary Harken (1910–1993) was an American surgeon. He was an innovator in heart surgery and introduced the concept of the intensive care unit.

== Life ==
Dwight Harken was born in Osceola, Iowa. He received his Bachelor's and Medical degrees from Harvard. While working at the Bellevue hospital in New York, he was awarded a fellowship to London to continue his studies in medicine.

During the Second World War, Harken served in the U.S. Army Medical Corps in London as a surgeon and had previously operated alongside Tudor Edwards. To treat his patients, he found a way to take out shrapnel safely from the heart by cutting into the wall of a beating heart, then inserting a finger to locate and remove the shrapnel. With this method, he became the first person to have repeated success in heart operation after removing shrapnel from the hearts of 134 soldiers during World War II without a single fatality.

In 1948, Harken discovered a way to correct mitral stenosis similar to how he operated on soldiers. A small hole would be cut in the heart and a finger would be used to widen the valve. This technique became known as blind surgery or closed heart surgery. At first, the majority of patients died, however as the method was refined, the fatality rate dropped and became safe.

Harken's concept of intensive care has been adopted worldwide and has improved the chance of survival for patients. He opened the first intensive care unit in 1951. In the 1960s, he developed the first device to help the heart pump. He also implanted artificial aortic and mitral valves. He continued to pioneer in surgical procedures for operating on the heart. He established and worked in several organizations related to the heart.

After the war, Harken taught for two years at Tufts University before returning to Harvard, where he would teach and serve as chief of thoracic surgery for the next 22 years. He died in 1993 in Cambridge, Massachusetts.
