= Alden H. Harken =

American surgeon and medical author

- Born: Alden Hood Harken; 1941 (age 84–85)
- Education: Harvard College; Case Western Reserve
- Known for: heart surgeon
- Father: Dwight E. Harken

Alden Hood Harken is an American cardiac surgeon, teacher and writer.

== Early life, education, military service ==
Alden Hood Harken was born in 1941 and grew up in Boston. His father was the cardiac surgeon, Dwight E. Harken.

Harken graduated from Harvard College in 1963. He then attended medical school at Case-Western Reserve University, graduating in 1967. He returned to Harvard for his both surgical and pediatric cardiovascular residencies at the Peter Bent Brigham Hospital and Boston Children's Hospital.

After his completing his residencies in 1973, Harken joined the U.S. Army, working at the Walter Reed Army Institute of Research in Washington, DC. He achieved the rank of lieutenant colonel.

== Career ==
After three years of military service, Harken joined the faculty at the University of Pennsylvania (Penn) in 1976. There he published articles on the electrophysiological basis and anatomic location of ventricular tachyarrhythmias. The observations led to the surgical strategy of map-guided sub-endocardial resection for the cure of ventricular tachycardia. Mark Josephson, a cardiac electrophysiologist also at Penn, and Harken developed the surgical technique of electrically targeting the anatomic origin of cardiac arrhythmias and stripping off the inner layer of the heart (sub-endocardial resection) a procedure that was dubbed the "Pennsylvania Peel". Prior to this, a Dutch group had developed a method of inducing these malignant heart rhythms; but, with medicines alone their patients suffered an 80 % one-year mortality rate. Josephson and Harken reversed this one-year mortality into an 80% one-year survival rate. By locating the disease on the inner surface of the heart, this work now serves as the basis for the catheter ablation of heart rhythm procedures.

After 8 years at Penn, Harken served for two decades as Chair of the Department of Surgery at the University of Colorado followed by 15 years as Chair of Surgery at the University of California, San Francisco - East Bay.

== Awards ==
His awards include the Thomas Jefferson Humanitarian Award from the University of Pennsylvania and the Lindback Award as the school's best teacher, the Lifetime Achievement Award from the Society of University Surgeons and numerous teaching awards. He has served as a Director of the American Board of Surgery and the American Board of Thoracic Surgery and as President of the Halsted Society, the Association of Academic Surgery, the Society of University Surgeons and as a Regent of the American College of Surgeons.

In 2009, Harken received the Heart Rhythm Society's "Pioneer in Cardiac Pacing and Electrophysiology Award". In 2017, Dr. Harken was the recipient of the Harken Award from Mended Hearts. In 2022 he was identified by the American College of Surgeons as an Icon in Surgery.

== Personal life ==
Harken and his wife, Laurie, have three children.

== Publications ==
Harken has published over 450 original journal articles and over 100 book chapters and editorials. He co-edited the first edition of the American College of Surgeons textbook of Surgery. He has also edited seven editions of Surgical Secrets, three editions of Surgical Debates, and one edition of Resident Readiness.

Some of his publications related to surgical intervention for ventricular tachycardia include:

- Harken, AH; Josephson, ME; Horowitz, LN (1979). "Surgical Endocardial Resection for the Treatment of Ventricular Tachycardia" Ann Surg 190: 456-460
- Josephson, ME; Harken, AH; Horowitz, LN (1979). "Endocardial Excision: a New Surgical Technique for the Treatment of Recurrent Ventricular Tachycardia" Circulation 60: 1430-1439
- Horowitz, LN; Harken, AH; Kastor, JA; Josephson, ME (1980). "Surgical Resection Guided By Epicardial and Endocardial Mapping for Treatment of Recurrent Ventricular Tachycardia". New Eng J Med 302:589-593
- Josephson, ME; Horowitz LN; Spielman SR; Greenspan AM; VandePol C; Harken, AH (1980). "Comparison of endocardial catheter mapping with intraoperative mapping of ventricular tachycardia". Circulation 61:395-404.
- Miller JM, Kienzle MG, Harken AH, Josephson ME (1984). "Subendocardial resection for ventricular tachycardia: Predictors of surgical success". Circulation 70:624-31.
