= Winston's Encyclopedia =

Winston's Encyclopedia, published under a variety of names and by different publishers and editors, was an encyclopedia set published in the early 20th century.

Originally titled Winston's Encyclopedia: A Compendium of Information for Home, School and Office, the set was first published by the John C. Winston Company, known mainly for their dictionaries. In 1912 the set was expanded from 8 to 10 volumes and retitled Winston's cumulative loose-leaf encyclopedia. As the name suggests, it was kept up to date by a series of loose-leaf supplements.

It was edited by Charles Smith Morris and Ainsworth Rand Spofford, who had both been associated with encyclopedia projects since the 1890s. Upon Smith's death in 1922, editorship passed to Thomas Edward Finnigan (Spofford died in 1908). From 1933 to 1950 the editor was William Dodge Lewis.

In 1942 the set was published by the Knickerbocker Press and brought out as the Encyclopedia Library and reprinted again under that title in 1943. This version was meant to be sold in supermarkets. It comprised 12 thin volumes and 3 and a half million words. A final 16-volume edition was published in 1950 as the American International Encyclopedia.
