= Charles Gwynn =

British Army general (1870–1962)

Major-General Sir Charles Gwynn KCB CMG DSO FRGS
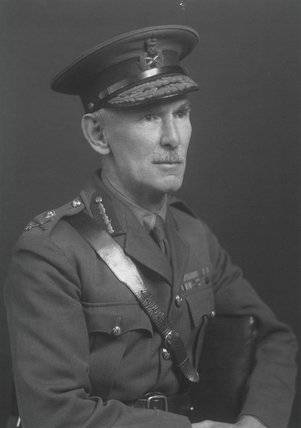
- Born: 4 February 1870; County Donegal, Ireland
- Died: 12 February 1963 (aged 93); Dublin, Republic of Ireland
- Military career
- Allegiance: United Kingdom
- Branch: British Army
- Service years: 1889–1931
- Rank: Major-General
- Unit: Royal Engineers
- Commands: Staff College, Camberley
- Conflicts: World War I
- Awards: Knight Commander of the Order of the Bath; Companion of the Order of St Michael and St George; Distinguished Service Order

Major-General Sir Charles William Gwynn, KCB, CMG, DSO, FRGS (4 February 1870 – 12 February 1963) was an Irish-born British Army officer, geographer, explorer and author of works on military history and theory.

== Birth and education ==
Charles William Gwynn was the fourth son of John Gwynn (1827–1917), Regius Professor of Divinity at Trinity College, Dublin, and his wife, Lucy Josephine (1840–1907) daughter of the Irish nationalist William Smith O'Brien. He was born at Ramelton, County Donegal, while his father was rector of the local church. He was educated at St. Columba's College, Dublin and at the Royal Military Academy, Woolwich.

== Military career ==
Gwynn was commissioned a second lieutenant in the Royal Engineers on 15 February 1889.

Promoted to lieutenant on 15 February 1892, he saw active service in West Africa 1893–94 in operations against the Sofas, and in 1897 joined the geographical section of the Intelligence Branch of the War Office. Following the reconquest of Sudan from the Mahdi, Gwynn undertook survey work there, remaining until 1904. He was promoted to captain on 15 February 1900, received a brevet promotion to major on the following day, and was appointed a Companion of the Order of St Michael and St George (CMG) for his survey work determining the Ethiopia–Sudan border. He attended the Staff College, Camberley from 1905 to 1906. He was promoted to major on 1 October 1908.

In June 1911, he was detailed to Australia as an instructor at the Royal Military College, Duntroon, where he served as the director of military art, instructing cadets in tactics, strategy and military history, with the temporary rank of lieutenant colonel. During much of his time there he acted as commandant while the head of the college, Brigadier General William Bridges, was away on tour.

With the outbreak of World War I, he returned to England, where he unsuccessfully sought a posting to France. In July 1915, he was sent to the Middle East and was appointed General staff Officer Grade 1 (GSO1) of the Australian 2nd Division at Gallipoli. He was eventually posted to serve as the chief of staff of the II Anzac Corps, a position he held until the end of the war. He was present at the battle of Messines in June 1917. His brother, Stephen, and Stephen's son, Dennis, also served in the Great War.

Gwynn was appointed a Companion of the Order of the Bath in 1918. During the Great War, he was mentioned in dispatches six times, received the brevet ranks of lieutenant-colonel and colonel, and was awarded the Belgian Croix de Guerre and the French Légion d'honneur.

After World War I, he served in a variety of assignments, mostly on the staff, culminating in May 1926 when he was made commandant of the Staff College, Camberley. He was promoted to major general on 1 January 1925.

Upon his retirement in 1931, he was appointed a Knight Commander of the Order of the Bath.

== Later life ==
After his retirement, in 1934, Major General Gwynn wrote Imperial Policing, covering the doctrine, legal principles, and operational case studies of how the British Army handled civil unrest, rebellions, and internal security duties across the British Empire during the interwar period. It is now regarded as a classic in the field of low intensity conflict and small wars.

== Family ==
In 1904 Gwynn married Mary ("Molly") Armstrong, widow of Lieutenant Lowry Armstrong of the Royal Navy. Molly Gwynn had a daughter by her first husband, named Margery Armstrong. Charles Gwynn had no children. Molly Gwynn died in 1951. Charles Gwynn spent his final years in Dublin, where he died in 1963 at the age of 93.

He is buried along with his wife Mary in the graveyard of St Maelruains Church, Tallaght. The inscription on the gravestone reads: In Memory of Major General Sir Charles Gwynn K.C.B. C.M.G. D.S.O. Born Ramelton 1878 Died Dublin 1963 And of his Beloved Wife Mary

== Personal characteristics ==
Gwynn was of medium height and wiry in build. He had a slight stammer.

== Publications by Charles Gwynn ==
- The Frontiers of Abyssinia: a retrospect Journal of the Royal African Society, Vol. 36, No. 143 (Apr. 1937), pp. 150–161
- Imperial Policing London: Macmillan, 1934
- The Second Great War: A Standard History (9 volumes, The Waverley Book Company Ltd in association with The Amalgamated Press, 1939–1946, edited by Sir John Hammerton), as Military Editor.

== Photographs ==
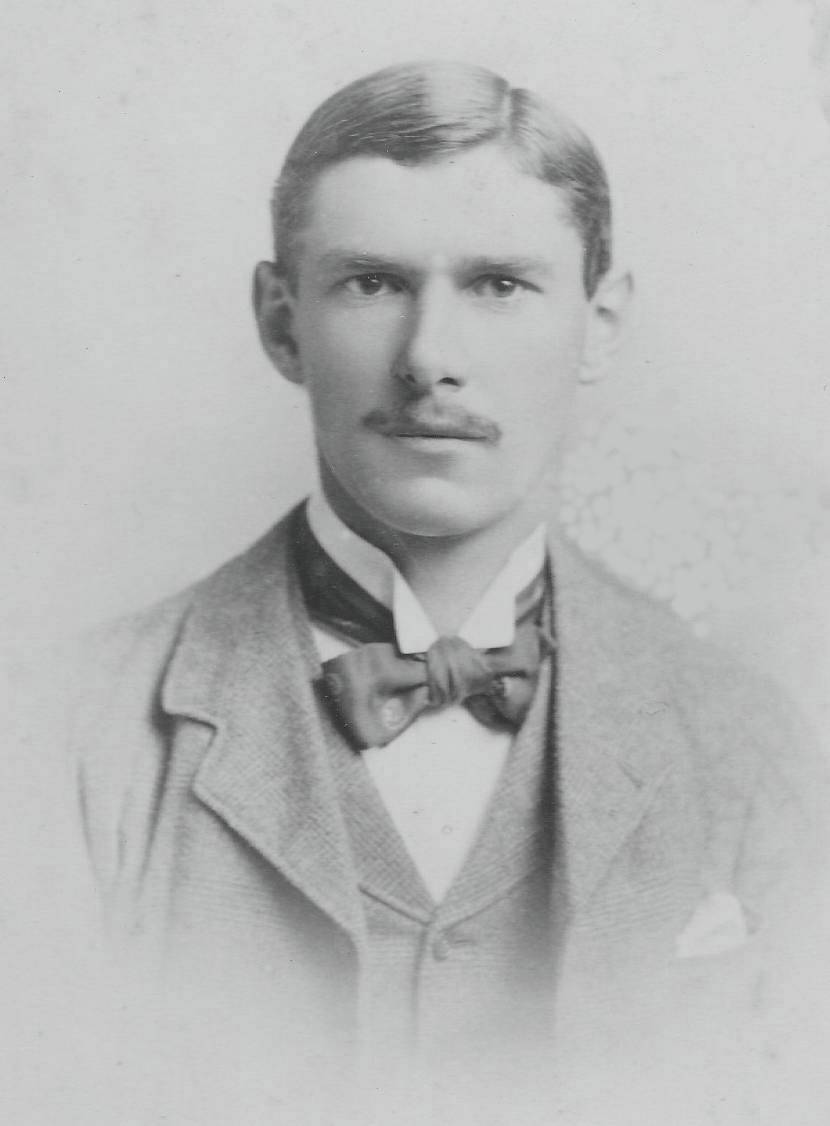
Charles Gwynn c.1890

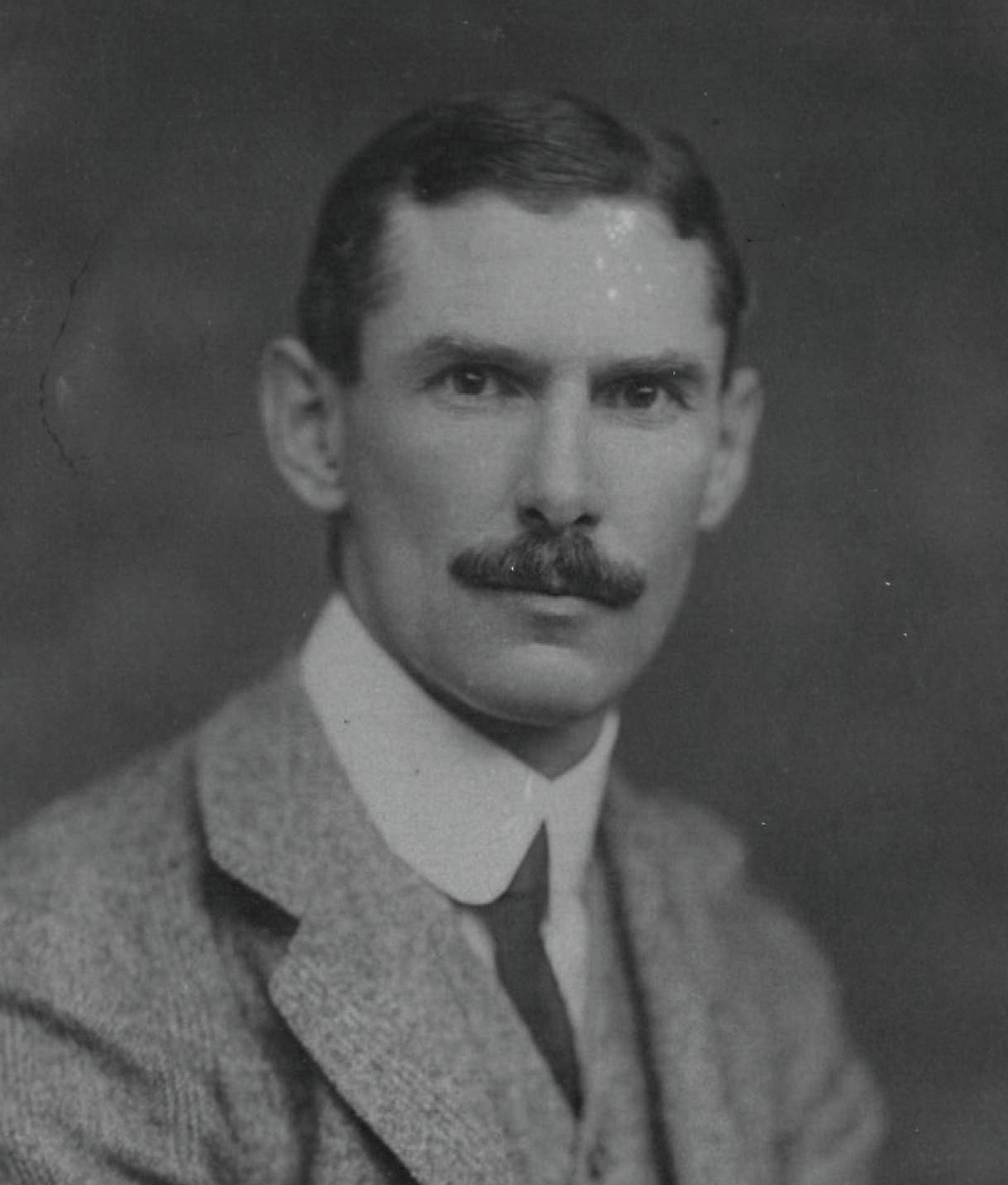
Charles Gwynn c. 1900

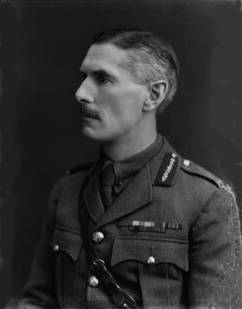
Charles Gwynn as an army officer, c.1905

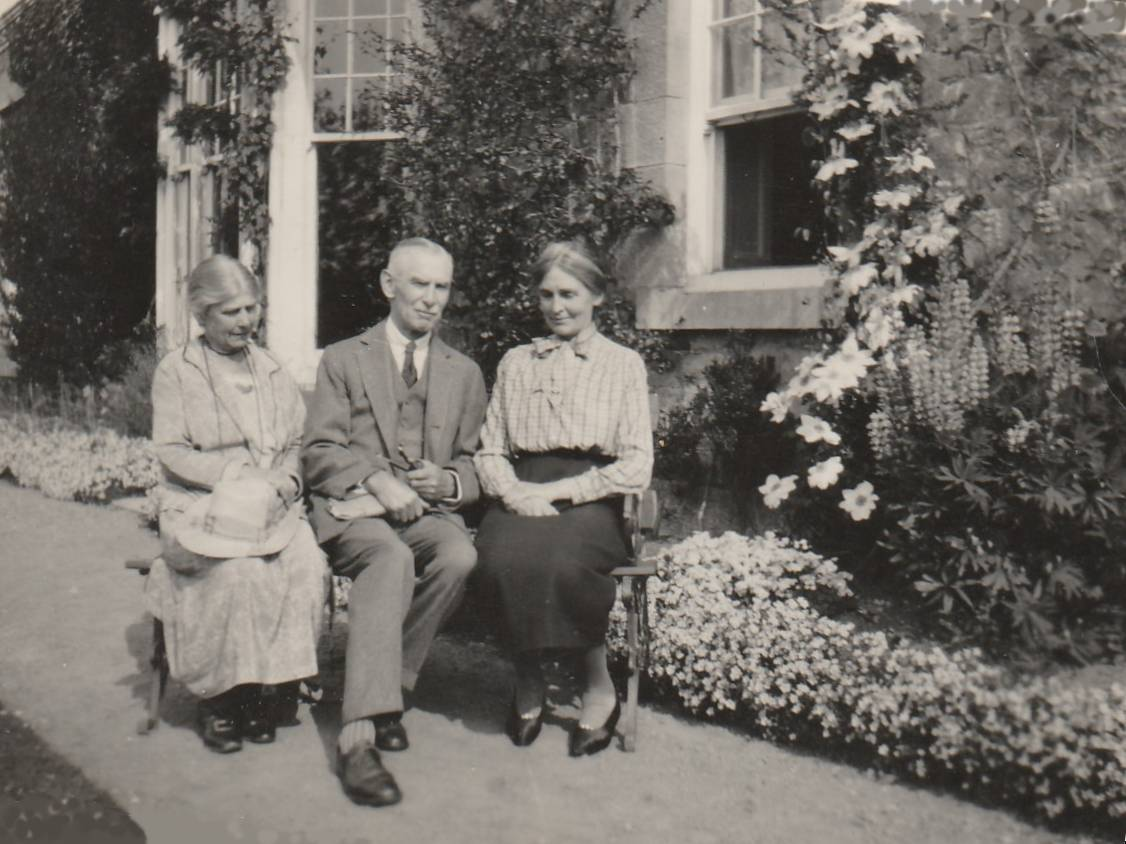
Charles Gwynn with sister Lucy and wife Molly, c.1939

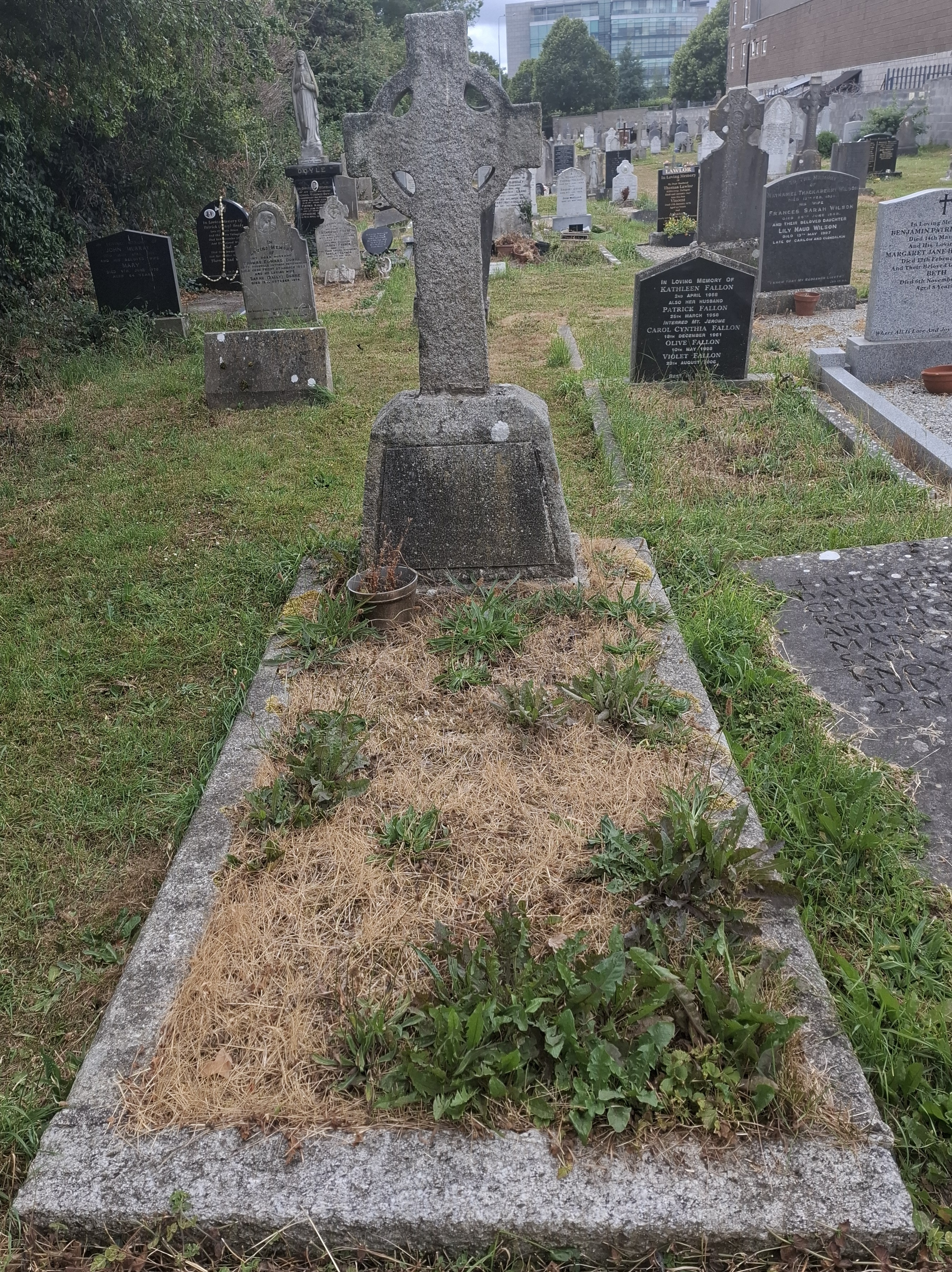
Resting place of Charles Gwynn and his wife Mary

Military offices
Preceded by Edmund Ironside	Commandant of the Staff College, Camberley; 1926–1931	Succeeded by John Dill
