= Alexander Whitelaw (editor) =

Scottish editor and writer

Alexander Whitelaw (1803–1846) was a Scottish editor and writer.

== Life ==
Whitelaw was born in Glasgow, and became an assistant to Robert Watt in the compilation of Bibliotheca Britannica. He later was a journalist and poet. Hired by the publishers Blackie, he edited illustrated books; he also edited the Popular Encyclopedia or Conversations Lexicon, which appeared from 1834 to 1842.

== Edited works ==
- The Casquet of Literary Gems (1828)
- The Republic of Letters (1833)
- Works of Robert Burns, 2 vols., 1843–4
- The Book of Scottish Song (1844)
- The Book of Scottish Ballads (1845)
