= Charles Drew (surgeon) =

British surgeon (1916–1987)

- Born: Charles Edwin Drew; 15 December 1916
- Died: 31 May 1987 (aged 70); United Kingdom
- Known for: Assisting in King George VI pneumonectomy, hypothermia in open heart surgery
- Medical career
- Field: Cardiothoracic surgery

Charles Edwin Drew (15 December 1916 – 31 May 1987) was a British cardiothoracic surgeon best known for assisting Sir Clement Price Thomas in King George VI's pneumonectomy in 1951.

He went on to conduct pioneering research on profound hypothermia in cardiac surgery and what came to be known as the 'Drew technique'.

Drew died from throat cancer at the age of 70 in 1987, leaving his wife Doreen and two children.

== Early life ==
Born in Lambeth, 15 December 1916, as the eldest son of Edwin Frank Drew, an accountant, and Eunice (née Lloyd-Davies), Drew started his education in Stockwell. He then went on to Westminster City School, where, in 1938, he won the Bulkeley prize. During World War II, he became surgeon lieutenant RNVR in 1942, one year after he had graduated. A porthole provided an escape route when his ship was sunk in the Mediterranean and he was able to continue his duties thereafter. By the end of the war, Drew had been promoted to surgeon-commander.

== Surgical career ==
Drew completed his junior surgical posts at Westminster hospital, where he also formed close associations with G. T. Mullalley and Sir Clement Price Thomas. He became surgical chief assistant at the Brompton Hospital and then consultant surgeon to the Westminster and St George's Hospitals.

=== King George VI lung operation ===
On 23 September 1951, he assisted Price Thomas, along with Peter Jones, with the pneumonectomy on King George VI. On removal of the king's tumour, Drew and his colleague Jones closed the chest. Later in his career, he performed the same operation on Price Thomas for the same disease.

=== The Drew technique ===
Drew was the first to use the technique of profound hypothermia in open heart surgery. The body temperature was lowered to such a point where cardiovascular arrest could just about be tolerated for the time necessary to carry out the heart operation. He continued to use this technique for the remaining 22 years of his surgical career.

Drew was convinced that much of the high mortality in cardiac surgery was due to a problem with the oxygenator systems. He proved a technique, 'the Drew technique', which involved two concepts: to provide circulatory support without an artificial oxygenator, and to repair the heart under conditions of circulatory arrest. Converting an old billiard room on the 6th floor of Westminster hospital into a research laboratory, Drew observed,

"A small number of experiments was sufficient to show that, using simple apparatus, it is possible to induce profound hypothermia in a dog, followed by complete circulatory arrest for 30 minutes, and then to rewarm it with recovery."

This became the basis of his 'Drew technique' in following cardiac operations. Success was recorded in cardiac operations with arrest lasting up to 45 minutes. He emphasised that cold was cardio-protective. Respiratory complications, so often seen when oxygenators were used, were not noted with the Drew technique.

His operating equipment is on display at the Science Museum, London.

== Awards ==
Drew was invited to present the Hunterian lecture at the Royal College of Surgeons of England in 1961. His presentation followed the framework of his research, 'Profound Hypothermia in Cardiac Surgery'.

== Personal life ==
Drew enjoyed sailing, gardening, and water polo. He was also interested in cricket and football and he rowed for University of London.

He married Maureen Pittaway in 1950. She was a sister at Queen Alexandra Royal Naval Nursing Service. They had two children.

== Later life ==
Later in life, Drew became a keen gardener and fisherman. In addition, he developed an interest in crosswords.

Following retirement, Drew was diagnosed with pharyngeal cancer, which required surgery and radiation. The cancer recurred and he died at home on 31 May 1987.
