= Our Wonder World =

20th-century American children's encyclopedia

Our Wonder World was a children's encyclopedia published from the 1910s to the mid-1960s, under a variety of names.

The original series was published in 10 volumes by the Chicago-based G. L. Schuman and Company. The series did not have named editors until at least 1926, when Howard Bristol Grose was credited as editor. The series included an 11th supplementary volume in at least the 1921 and 1926 editions. This edition was topically arranged, rather than alphabetical, designed for browsing rather than direct reference. It also contained "fictional as well as factual information."

In 1932 the set was thoroughly revised and expanded as the New Wonder World. Like its predecessor, New Wonder World was topically organized and the eleventh volume was a study guide. This set was published at "regular intervals" until 1943 and annually until 1955. The set was then purchased by Parents Magazine Educational Press and published as the New Wonder World Encyclopedia in 1959–1960. The new edition was in 10 volumes rather than 11, the index volume being dispensed with and indexes added to the end of each volume. This edition had 4,000 pages, 2 and half million words, 4,000 illustrations and 25,000 index entries. In 1962 the set was republished as the New Wonder World Cultural Library and in 1964 simply Cultural Library

The 1965 Cultural Library would be the final edition. It had 10 volumes, 4,500 pages, 2.5 million words and 3,000 illustrations. It was not received well. A review in Booklist claimed that its facts were out of date, the indexes inconsistent and inadequate as to make them useless, had a lack of balance and an unattractive format."
