= Popular Encyclopedia or Conversations Lexicon =

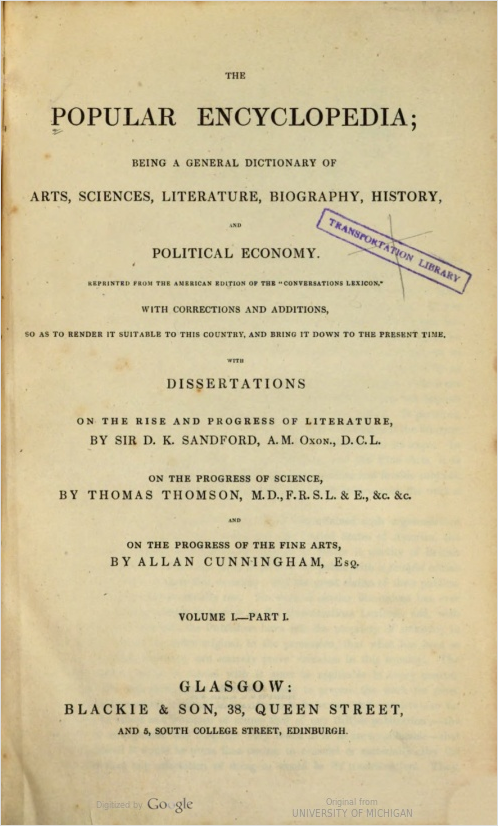
Popular Encyclopedia or Conversations Lexicon

The Popular Encyclopedia or Conversations Lexicon was a British encyclopedia that was published from 1837 to 1893 by Blackie and Son, of Glasgow. It was originally a reprint of Francis Lieber's Encyclopedia Americana, itself based on the Brockhaus Enzyklopädie.

A new edition was published in 1841, this time omitting the reference to the Americana in the subtitle. Further seven volume editions were published in 1862 and 1877 under the editorship of Alexander Whitelaw. In 1882 the set was taken over by Charles Annandale whose edition of 1890-93 was expanded to 14 volumes.

Blackie and Son was bought out by Gresham Publishing Company in 1901 and republished as the New Popular Encyclopedia, and in 1906 as the Modern Encyclopedia of Universal Knowledge.

In 1889-1890 Blackie and Son also published Blackies Modern Cyclopaedia of Universal Information, also edited by Annandale. The relationship between this work and the above encyclopedias is unclear, but it though that they are closely related.

== American editions ==
Meanwhile, in the United States, Gebbie and Company published a version of Blackies with the title New Cabinet Encyclopedia and Treasury of Knowledge with the American-related articles revised and edited by Ainsworth Rand Spofford. It then was republished under different titles and various imprints as the New National Encyclopedia and Treasury (Brown, Edgar and Hull, 1899), XX Century Cyclopedia (Gebbie 1901), New Twentieth Century Encyclopedia and Dictionary (E. R. Dumont 1903) which included two volumes of a biographical dictionary "living Americans" and two volumes of an English dictionary, bringing the total number of volumes to 12, New and Complete Universal Self Pronouncing Encyclopedia, in the original 8 volume format, (International Press, 1905), New Cosmopolitan Encyclopedia (Thompson, 1906) and New Encyclopedia of Reference (Standard Bookbinnding 1912)
