= Peter Jones (surgeon) =

- Born: 1 March 1917
- Died: 30 July 1984 (aged 67)
- Medical career
- Profession: Surgeon

Peter Henry Jones (1 March 1917 – 30 July 1984), was born in Monmouth and is best known for his role in assisting Sir Clement Price Thomas in the pneumonectomy of King George VI in 1951.

He subsequently remained professionally close to Price Thomas, pursuing a career in cardiothoracic surgery.

== Early life ==
Jones was educated in Pontypool at Haberdashers' Aske's West Monmouth School.

== Medical career ==
Jones studies medicine at King's College, London, and qualified with MRCS, LRCP from Westminster Hospital Medical School in 1939. He stayed on at the hospital to complete his junior house posts. Between 1942 and 1946, he joined the Royal Army Medical Corps as a regimental medical officer to a field artillery regiment in North Africa and Italy. He witnessed the Salerno landing and the attack on Monte Cassino. Declining an elevation in rank, he opted to endure the rest of the war along with his regiment. Returning to England in 1946, Jones continued his surgical training and passed the FRCS in 1948. Afterwards, he joined the surgical team under Sir Clement Price Thomas at the Brompton Hospital and Westminster Hospitals.

Baguley and Davyhulme Hospitals appointed Jones as thoracic surgeon in 1955 and Manchester Royal Infirmary took him on in 1960. Also, in 1960, Jones attended the Presbyterian Hospital in San Francisco to learn new techniques in open heart surgery. After spending six months with Dr Frank Gerbode, he returned to Westminster Hospital as thoracic surgeon.

As Hunterian Professor, he gave a lecture on bronchial sleeve resection in 1958.

=== Sir Clement Price Thomas ===
In 1951, Jones spent three weeks as resident surgeon in Buckingham Palace. On 23 September 1951, whilst still in the palace, he had assisted Price Thomas with the pneumonectomy on King George VI’s lung cancer. In return, he was awarded the MVO. The surgery has since been researched and re-enacted by real surgeons in Stephen Daldry's The Crown (TV series).

== Later life ==
Jones enjoyed fishing and antique clocks. Coronary artery disease and an illness resulting in loss of voice limited his activities and resulted in his premature retirement.

He died on 30 July 1984 leaving his wife Monica, two children and four grandchildren.
