= Ernest Rock Carling =

Carling in 1949.

Sir Ernest Rock Carling (1877–1960) was a British surgeon, war veteran and pioneering radiologist best known for his association with Westminster Hospital.

== Surgeon ==
Carling joined the staff of the Westminster Hospital in 1906 after serving at the Imperial Yeomanry Field Hospital as a medical student during the South African war. In 1910, Rock Carling was acting as Dean of the Westminster Hospital Medical School.

== Radiologist ==
In 1928, Carling established a radium centre at the Westminster Hospital, where with the assistance of his son Francis Carling, he set up the first "radium bombs". An example of a "radium bomb" can be seen at the Science Museum Group in the Medicine: Wellcome Galleries. Rock Carling became a member of the Medical Research Council and the Radium Trust that year.

In 1929, Carling authored a Course of instruction in radium practice. His later publications include: British Surgical Practice (which he wrote with J. P. Ross in 1947). Rock Carling was a member of several committees related to nuclear energy and was chairman of both the International Commission on Radiological Protection and the Radium Commission of the Central Health Services Council. He was also Chairman of the British Ministry of Health Cancer Commission.

In 1950, following the publication of an estimate of the human toll of a hypothetical atomic explosion over London, Carling stated that "to live in the atomic age is perforce to accept the implications: Fully faced they are robbed of half their terrors." In 1951, he was quoted in American newspapers as stating that efficient medical treatments had been developed to counter the effects of almost all known biological weapons.

=== Cancer treatment unit ===
In 1954, Rock Carling opened Britain's first Cobalt therapy cancer treatment unit at the Bristol General Hospital.

In 1955, Carling wrote British Practice in Radiotherapy with B. W. Windeyer and D. W. Smithers.

== Charitable work ==
Rock Carling was a founding member of the City of Westminster Old People's Welfare Association and a long-serving member of the Westminster Medical School Council and the Society for the Relief of Widows and Orphans of Medical Men.

Dr A. J. Shinnie wrote of Carling in the British Medical Journal that "all his life he lived for Westminster Hospital", and that the new building there that opened in 1939 was his "child". Carling died in 1960 at the age of 83.
