= The Random House Encyclopedia =

- Cover of third edition
- Author: Various experts of different subjects. Editor in chief James Mitchell and editorial director Jess Stein.
- Cover artist: Peter Bradford and Orville Ottey
- Language: English
- Genre: Encyclopaedia
- Published: 1977 (first edition), 1983 (second edition), 1990 (third edition)
- Publication place: United States
- Pages: 2912 (third edition)
- ISBN: 0-39458450-3

The Random House Encyclopedia is an English language one-volume general encyclopaedia published by Random House. The first edition was published in 1977, followed by a second edition in 1983 and a third edition in 1990. The encyclopaedia is divided into two sections: Colorpedia, which is made of lengthy, illustrated articles, and Alphapedia, which features short, alphabetically arranged ones. The third edition comprised over 25,000 articles, including 13,500 illustrations and maps, with over 45,000 cross-references.

The 25,000 articles of the Alphapedia of the third edition were the basis for an electronic version. It was made for the MS-DOS 3.3 operating system and was distributed on sixteen 5 1/4-inch floppy disks and also on eight 3 1/2-inch floppy disks. The Random House Encyclopedia also served as the basis for different editions in over 20 countries, including the ten-volume Joy of Knowledge encyclopedia published in Great Britain.

== Contents ==
Example of an article about reference books.
- Preface 6
- Staff, Contributors, and Consultants 8
- Organization of the Encyclopedia 12
- Colorpedia: Detailed Contents 16
- Time Chart: Contents 28
- Atlas: Contents 29
- Colorpedia: Text 30
1. The Universe 32
2. The Earth 160
3. Life on Earth 400
4. Man 640
5. History and Culture 944
6. Man and Science 1432
7. Man and Machines 1576
8. Time Chart: Text 1825
- Alphapedia 1876
- Bibliography 2761
- Picture Credits 2771
- Art Credits 2781
- Atlas of the World A1
- Atlas Index A83

New works of reference
In the future, printed reference books will undoubtedly be supplemented by more technologically advanced ways of storing and retrieving information. Computer data banks can hold an enormous amount of information in a way that enables it to be available instantly and readily updated.

—
