= La Salle Extension University Encyclopedia =

The La Salle Extension University Encyclopedia was a single volume general encyclopedia published in 1909. It was published simultaneously as Everybody's Encyclopedia and Webster's Universal Encyclopedia. All three were identical in format - quarto volumes with 1367 pages, edited by Charles Higgins and published by De Bower-Chapline of Chicago.

An abridged, 624 page edition was published in 1910 by Fidelity Publishing House of New York and Chicago as the Modern Universal Encyclopedia. In addition to Higgins, Charles Annandale, R. Archer Johnson and H. D. Lovett. In 1913 another abridged edition was published, this time by National Publishing Company of Philadelphia as the Home and Office Reference Book of Facts. This edition was in 632 pages and all of the editors of the 1910 edition were listed, with the exception of Johnson.
