= Teacher's and Pupil's Cyclopaedia =

The Teacher's and Pupil's Cyclopaedia was the original name of an encyclopedia set that was published in the United States in different forms for nearly 60 years.

It was supposed first published in 1895 in three volumes, according to the Federal Trade Commission (Docket #1331), however the earliest reference in the standard bibliographical works are four volume published 1904–5. This was re-issued in 1905, 1906 and 1907 the latter in 5 volumes. In 1906 Encyclopedic Current Reference was published in two volumes and is thought to be an abridged edition of the earlier work.

In 1910 the New Teacher's and Pupil's Cyclopaedia was published in five volumes. This was expanded to six in 1913, seven in 1915 and 8 in 1927. In the latter two cases the last two volumes were "Practical Home and School Methods". Two abridged versions were published in 1911 - the two volume Practical American Encyclopedia and the one volume Unrivaled Encyclopedia. These were published under the imprint of W. B. Cockey, the printer of the usual publisher, Holst Publishing Company.

In 1923 the same encyclopedia was published as the International Reference Work in 10 volumes, which was sold simultaneously with New Teacher's and Pupil's Cyclopaedia. This is brought the publishers into conflict with the Federal Trade Commission, and they were eventually served the above-mentioned Cease and Desist (Docket #1331). As selling the same product as two different works was prohibited the two were merged into the Progressive Reference Library, in 10 volumes, which clearly stated that it was an amalgamation of International Reference Work and New Teacher's and Pupil's Cyclopaedia. Notably, both works claimed that Ruric Neval Roark was an editor as late as 1927, despite the fact that he had died in 1909.

Under the Progressive Reference Library moniker the encyclopedias quality improved and it was considered "relatively respectible, despite its mediocre quality". Further editions were published in 1935 and 1939, this last enlarged to 11 volumes. 1939 was also the year that Paul Holst died.

By 1945 the set had been bought out by the Universal Educational Guild and published in 20 volumes in 1945 as the World Scope Encyclopedia. The first 17 volumes were a reprint of the 1939 edition, the 18th was a miscellany and the last two were a copy of Websters New Illustrated Dictionary. The 1946 edition, however, was thoroughly revised by William H. Hendelson. The quality of the work was much improve, though it still was considered sub-par compared to its competitors. The Encyclopedic element was expanded to 12 volumes and the dictionary was expended with. The set was then issued annually until 1963. In 1953 the publishers published two further reprints of the set - the 18 volume New World Family Encyclopedia and the 20 volume Standard International Encyclopedia, the latter including a two volume world atlas. Standard International Encyclopedia was reissued in 1957 with a two volume index. The New World Family Encyclopedia was published in cheap thin volumes on a "book a week" program, and both were sold through food stores. However, as substantially the same product was being sold at different prices under different names, the publishers of the set were again brought before the Federal Trade Commission in 1954 (Docket #5938).

After experiencing financial difficulties the publishers of World Scope Encyclopedia, now operating under the name World Scope Publishers, sold the set to Publisher's Company, Inc. of Washington, D.C. In 1964 the new owners issued the set under three titles - New American Encyclopedia, World University Encyclopedia and World Educator Encyclopedia. Each of these was issued in 12 volumes. World University Encyclopedia was sold through department stores, and World Educator Encyclopedia through a Miami imprint, Florid International Book Distributors.
