= New Standard Encyclopedia (1906) =

The New Standard Encyclopedia was published from 1906 to at least the mid-1960s under a variety of titles and by different publishers.

The original encyclopedia was published in 1906, in 12 volumes, by the University Society. Inc. It may or may not have been a reprint of the 1899 Standard American Encyclopedia. It was re-issued in this format 1907–08, 1911 and 1916. In 1909 it was also issued in an 8 volume format under the Hamilton Book Company imprint as the Practical Home Encyclopedia.

In 1912 it was issued under the Standard American Encyclopedia title in an 8 volume edition with the imprint of the Wheeler Publishing Company. It was published again under this title in 1916, this time in 12 volumes under the University Society. Inc imprint.

In 1937 a Standard American Encyclopedia was published in 15 volumes by the Standard American Corporation of Chicago, as a premium for newspaper subscriptions. It is unclear if it is related to the previous sets. It was reprinted under this title in 1939, 1940 and 1941, by which time it had expanded to 20 volumes. In 1942 it was renamed the International's World Reference Encyclopedia under the imprint of the International Readers League in 10 volumes or "20 volumes in 10 books" as it was advertised. Like the earlier set it was offered as a premium for newspaper subscriptions and was published again in 1944. In 1945 the set was published as Universal World Reference Encyclopedia under the University Society imprint, edited by Franklin Julius Meine. From 1949 to 1955 it was edited by Mary Francis McKenna, and from 1959 to the mid-1960s by Virginia Sarah Thatcher. By this time the reputation of the set had substantially improved, though it was still considered second rate compared to other encyclopedias of similar price.

By the mid-1960s the set was being published by Consolidated Book Publishers. After the 1965 edition received scathing reviews, Consolidated claimed that their 1970 edition would be revised, however the 1970 edition was also poorly received. An announced 1974 revision never materialized and in 1975 the set was completely discontinued.
