= New Standard Encyclopedia (1910) =

The New Standard Encyclopedia was the most common name for an encyclopedia that ran from 1910 to the mid-1960s.

The set began on the initiative of George Briggs Aiton, an Inspector of Schools in Minnesota, who felt that he could use experience and contact with children to create a home and school encyclopedia. This edition, Aiton's Encyclopedia, in 5 volumes, was published by the Minneapolis based Welles Brothers and Company would be the only one that Aiton was involve in or carry his name.

The set appeared under the name Standard Reference Work in 1912 in 6 volumes, published under the imprint of the Interstate Publishing Company of Chicago. It was reprinted again the next year by Welles Brothers and Company. It was issued again in 1915 and 1917, when it was enlarged to 7 volumes, the last being a reading and study guide. In 1922 it was published in 10 volumes, the last two being a study guide. This was published under the imprint of the Standard Education Society. It was this edition that brought the attention of the Federal Trade Commission who issued a Cease and Desist Order for misrepresentation in 1923 (Docket #994). As a result, in 1923 the set was reprinted as the National Encyclopedia for the Home, School and Library in 10 volumes under the National Encyclopedia Company imprint. It is unclear whether this was meant to be permanent, but the set reverted to the old name one last time for an edition in 1927.

From 1930 to at least the 1960s it was published under the title New Standard Encyclopedia under the Standard Encyclopaedia Company imprint. Over time its quality improved from poor to fair, as one bibliographer put it.

In 1939 there was also an edition for Canadian and Commonwealth readers published as the Consolidated Encyclopedia.

In 1983 the encyclopedia was expanded from 14 to 17 volumes. Under the direction of Douglas W. Downey, the New Standard was considered a "solid respectable set" for older students and family, though its lack of an index, inadequate coverage of controversial subjects, overly concise tone and poor, black and white illustrations. However, one of the sets strengths was its up-to-dateness, the 1985 edition including new or updated articles on such subjects as AIDS, compact disc players, Lech Wałęsa, Geraldine Ferraro, Milton Friedman, options trading, and the Space Shuttle. When discussing controversial topics such as the death penalty, the encyclopedia tried to given an impartial overview of differing views, however with other subjects like abortion or Scientology the encyclopedia did not mention any of the controversies surrounding them. This edition had 10,000 pages, 17,500 articles and 6.5 million words. The articles were of the specific entry type, averaging 375 words or more than half a page. None of the articles were signed, but 90 editors were listed at the beginning of Volume 1, together with a larger staff of 700 contributors, consultants, advisors and authentication. There were 12,000 illustrations, 5,000 in color and 650 maps. In lieu of an index, there were 53,000 cross-references.

In 1989 the encyclopedia expanded to 20 volumes and added an index. This helped improve the sets standing, however it was still considered second rate compared to Compton's Encyclopedia or World Book Encyclopedia The 1993 set had 8 million words, 10,750 pages, 17,500 articles and 1,000 bibliographies. There were 13,000 maps an illustrations, 53,600 cross references and 100,000 index entries. Downey staff numbered 80, but there were 800 contributors in all. The sets reputation for factual accuracy was partly due to the authenticator system, in which each article was reviewed by five different. The set was kept rigorously up-to-date with 2,000 articles out of 17,000 revised in some way each year. There was also an updating supplement World Progress: The Standard Quarterly Review published four times a year. Still the set was criticized for superficial treatment of controversial issues including abortion, adoption, race and intelligence and alcoholism. And even with its strong revision system did not mention things such as Galileos's pardon by the Catholic Church, controversies regarding the Dead Sea Scrolls or then recent (1993) US Supreme Court cases regarding abortion.
