= Everybody's Enquire Within =

1937 encyclopedia edited by Charles Ray

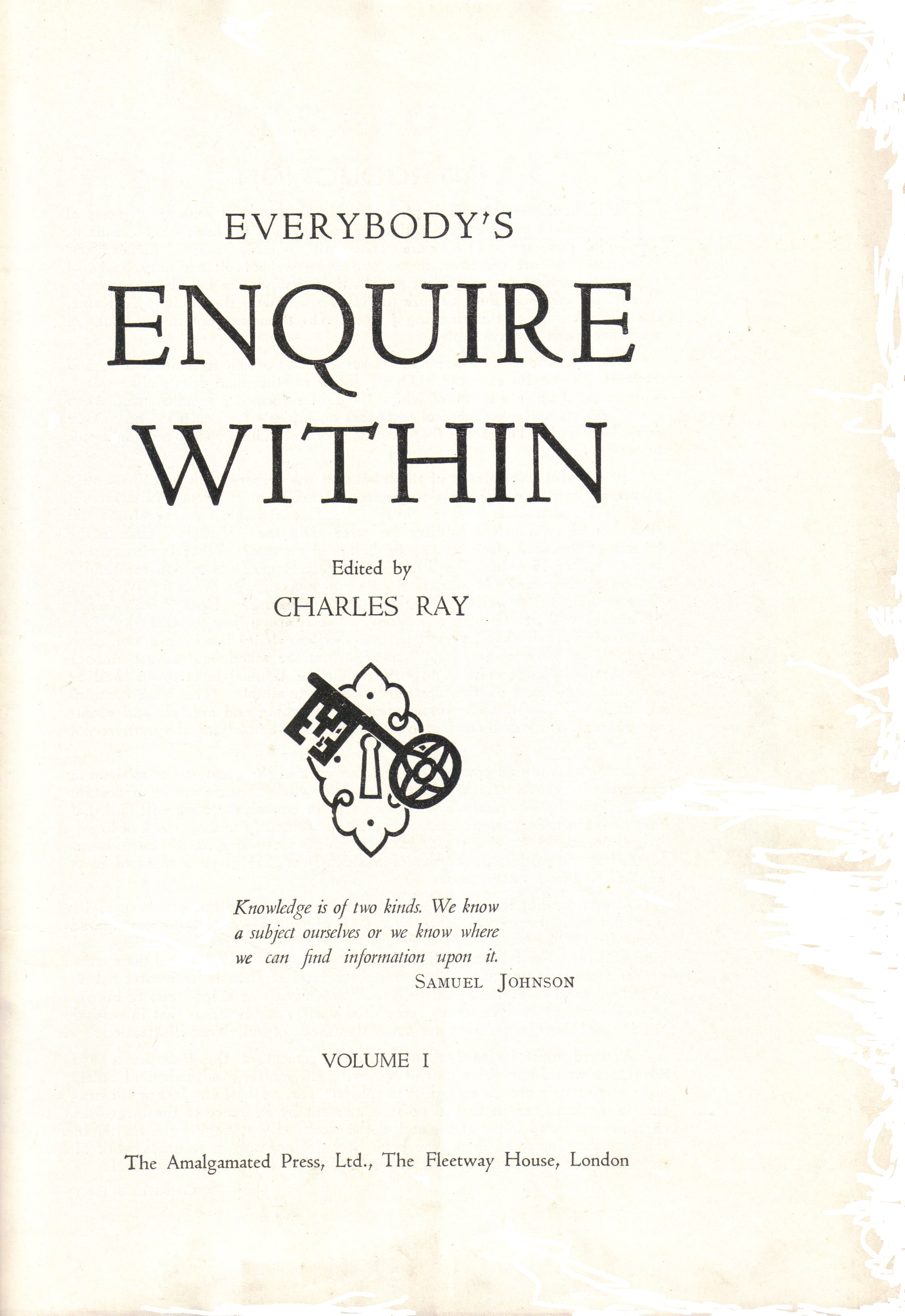
The title page of Everybody's Enquire Within

Everybody's Enquire Within is a lavishly illustrated book of miscellaneous knowledge first issued in weekly instalments in Britain from 1937 to 1938. It was edited by Charles Ray and published by the Amalgamated Press Ltd. It is not to be confused with the book Enquire Within Upon Everything which is a reference book with few if any illustrations.

The book was issued in fifty-five weekly instalments from Thursday 14 October 1937. The last was issued on Thursday 27 October 1938. There are 1544 pages including the index. The instalments were intended to form two volumes: Volume One – parts 1 to 26, pp. 1–732; Volume Two – parts 27 to 55, pp. 733–1544.

== Contents ==
The editor Charles Ray informs in his Introduction that the book contains 10,000 questions and offers 100,000 facts in answer to these questions. He gives the following examples of the questions posed:

“Are diamonds always white? What is a magic square? Must the Riot Act be read before soldiers can fire? Did the ‘Titanic’ sink to the bottom of the sea? Can an egg be balanced on end? What is rice paper? Is the number 13 unlucky? What is the Jolly Roger? Is a high forehead a sign of intelligence? Is a scare a cure for hiccoughs? What is a Nordic? Does ivy damage a wall? What is a singing mouse? Does it rain on the Sahara? Was St. George a Briton?”
“An outstanding feature of the work is the vast mass of illustrations specially prepared with the greatest care by a staff of experts – photographs gathered from all over the world, and drawings by artists of technical knowledge and high ability. The full-page drawings are particularly valuable and their comprehensiveness is unique. Whether it be a page of British freshwater fishes, of British owls or hawks or ducks, of railway signals or ships’ sails or buoys, or road signs or bridges, every recognised variety is given, so that in several hundreds of these pages there are many thousands of individual illustrations.”

At a conservative estimate, there are at least 5000 black-and-white photographs, diagrams, drawings and illustrations in the book. Very few of the pages have only one of these (e.g. p. 424), and they mostly have at least two or more of these. Also the estimate does not include the countless illustrations and drawings contained in the following:

(1) The book has innumerable whole pages containing nothing but black-and-white illustrations e.g.

- "Is That Bird a Rook?" (p. 11) with drawings of eight different birds.
- "Is That Boat a Cutter or a Yawl?" (p. 19) with nine drawings of different boats.
- "What is That Brush Used For? Many Kinds of Brooms and Brushes" (pp. 970-971) with drawings of 105 different types of brushes.

(2) Female interest is not neglected for example:

- "When Did Women Dress Like That?" (colour plate facing p. 761) with examples of 25 ladies' dresses from the year 600 to 1790.
- "When Was That Bonnet Worn? (p. 793) with 48 varieties of women's hats from 1801 to 1890.
- "When Was That Coat Worn? (p. 975) with 48 kinds of women's coats from 1846 to 1899.
- "When Did Women Dress Their Hair Like That? Examples of 1000 years." (pp. 1362-1363) with 94 drawings of women's hair style.

(3) There are also fifty-four colour plate pages, one of which consists of three folded pages - “Flags of All Independent Nations” – frontispiece. Ten of the colour plates have two folded pages, and forty-three are single pages. The following are the ten double page colour plates:

- What is That Berry? Wild Berries of the British Countryside. Facing p. 33
- What Fern is That? All the Native Ferns of Great Britain. Facing p. 117
- What is the Name of that Sea Anemone? 50 British Species. Facing p. 201
- What Tartan is That? 76 Distinctive Scottish Examples. Facing p. 341
- How does that Locomotive Work? L.M.S. ‘Coronation’ and the Train it Draws. Facing p. 481
- When did Warriors Dress Like that? Armour through Six Centuries. Facing p. 677
- What is that Butterfly Called? All the Species Found in Britain. Facing p. 733
- What is that British Caterpillar? A Hundred Familiar Varieties. Facing p. 845
- What is that Garden Flower? Types of the Principal Cultivated Blooms. Facing p. 1153
- What is that Medal Ribbon? Facing p. 1209

== Republications ==
A small part of this book, roughly one-fifth (311 pages), was published in 2012 under the title of Everybody's Book of Knowledge (having been originally published in 2007 under the title of Every Boy's Book of Knowledge). It also contains sixteen of the colour plates of which eight are double folded pages. The two double folded pages that are not included in this volume are "What is That Medal Ribbon?" and "What is That Berry? Wild Berries of the British Countryside."
