= Collier's New Encyclopedia =

Collier's New Encyclopedia was published by P. F. Collier & Son from 1902 to 1929. It is distinct from the more famous Collier's Encyclopedia that began to be published in 1949, despite the fact that they had the same publisher and similar names. First published in 1902 in 16 volumes, the set was reprinted often, though not completely revised until 1921. Further editions were published in 1926, 1928 and 1929. In lieu of revision, between 1905 and 1921 the set was a supplemented by the Colliers's Self Indexing Annual. However, this was stopped in 1921 and a "yearly revision service" began. This was also around the time that the Encyclopedia gained the subtitle "a loose-leaf and self-revising reference work".

The University Encyclopedia of Twentieth Century Knowledge published by Collier in 1902 in 10 volumes was evidently an abridgement or reprint of this work.
