= Columbia Encyclopedia =

Encyclopedia

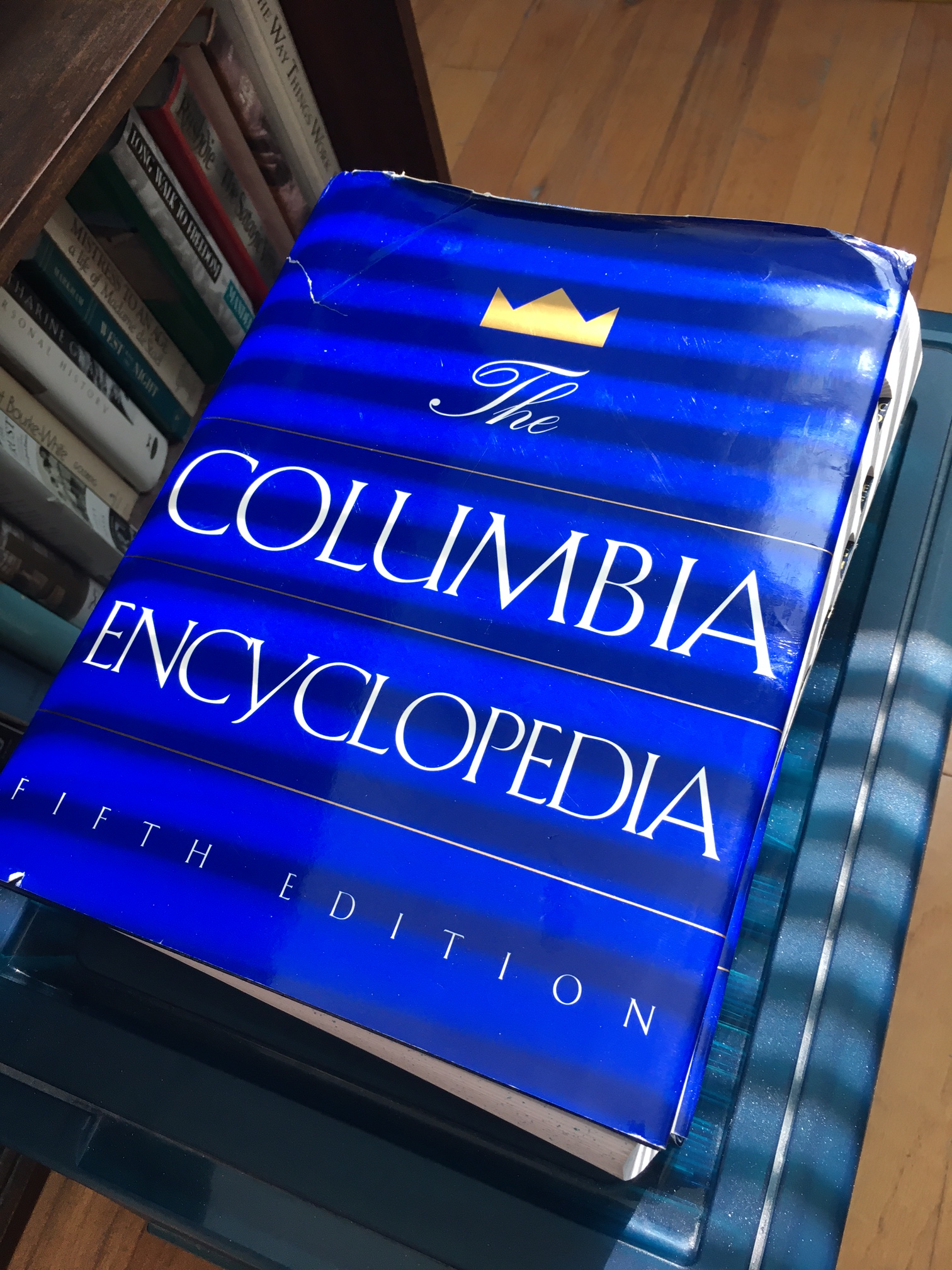
- Fifth edition cover
- Language: English
- Subject: Encyclopedia
- Publisher: Columbia University Press
- Publication date: 1935
- Publication place: United States
- Media type: Print
- Pages: about 3,200 (sixth edition)

The Columbia Encyclopedia is a one-volume encyclopedia produced by Columbia University Press and, in the last edition, sold by the Gale Group. First published in 1935, and continuing its relationship with Columbia University, the encyclopedia underwent major revisions in 1950 and 1963; the current edition is the sixth, printed in 2000. It contains over 51,000 articles totaling some 6.5 million words and has also been published in two volumes.

An electronic version of the encyclopedia is available, and the Columbia Encyclopedia is licensed by several different companies for use over the Internet.

== See also ==
- Lincoln Library of Essential Information
- Lists of encyclopedias
- List of online encyclopedias
