= Standard Dictionary of Facts =

Encyclopedia

The Standard Dictionary of Facts was a single volume general encyclopedia that was published from 1908 to 1927 on a mostly annual basis by the Frontier Press of Buffalo. It was in some ways a predecessor to that firm's much more famous Lincoln Library of Essential Information.

The first edition was edited by Henry Woldmar Ruoff, who had previously edited the Century Book of Facts. Ruoff association with book was evidently terminated sometime in 1916 or 1917, because, though he is credited as the editor of the 1916 edition he is only credited as the editor of the first edition in 1917 and not mentioned in subsequent editions.

It was published on an annual bases, a new edition coming out each year between 1908 and 1927 inclusive, with the exception of 1915 and 1926.

== See also ==
- Lincoln Library of Essential Information
