= Howard B. Grose =

American Baptist minister and journalist (1851–1939)

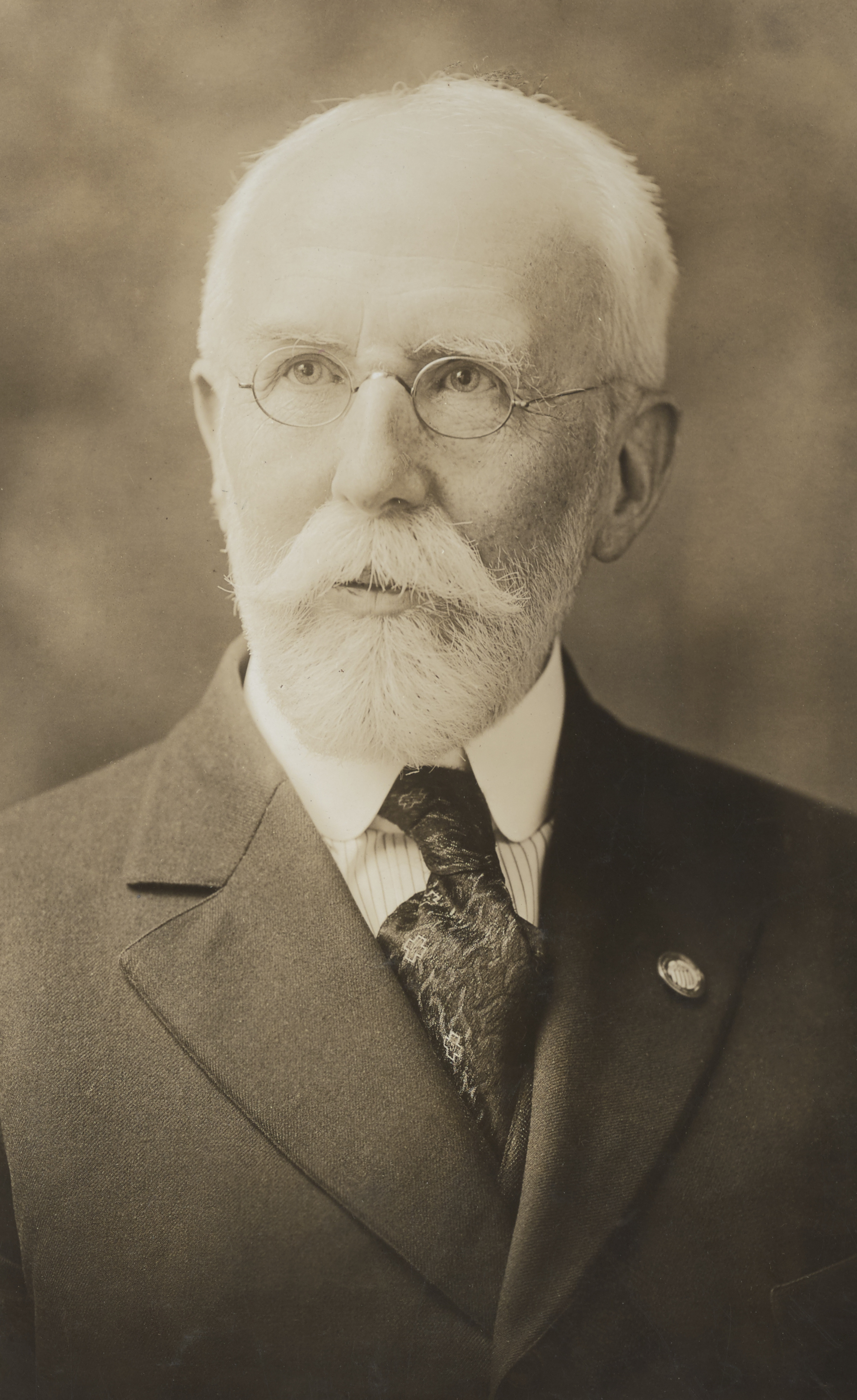
- Born: September 5, 1851; Millerton, New York, US
- Died: May 19, 1939 (aged 87); Ballston Spa, New York, US
- Occupation(s): Baptist minister and journalist

Howard Benjamin Grose (September 5, 1851 – May 19, 1939) was an American Baptist minister, journalist, writer of hymns, educator, university president, newspaper editor, and author.

== Early life and education ==
Grose was born September 5, 1981 in Millerton, New York to Reverend Henry Laurence Grose.

He graduated from University of Rochester in 1876. In 1883, he became an ordained Baptist minister.

== Career ==
Grose began his career as a correspondent for the Chicago Tribune, then became a staff member with the New York Examiner.

From 1883 to 1890, Grose served in Poughkeepsie and Pittsburgh as a Baptist minister.

In 1890, he became the president of the University of South Dakota, a contentious position he held for two years. Grose then began teaching history at Chicago University. During this time, he was also the associate editor of the Watchman, published in Boston.

From 1900 to 1903, Grose was the pastor of the First Baptist Church in Jamaica Plain, after which he became the editorial secretary of the American Baptist Home Mission Society.

In 1910, Grose became the editor of Missions. He remained in the position until his retirement in 1933, at which point he was named editor-emeritus.

Grose wrote on various subjects including China and Chinese people, Cuba, Puerto Rico, immigration, Baptist missions and biographical memoirs of George Edwin Horr and John Roach. He also copyrighted hymns.

After the publication of The Incoming Millions in 1906, a reviewer with Religious Telescope called Grose "the most important writer of this century".

== Personal life ==
Grose married Caroline Bristol, with whom he had at least two sons, Howard Grose, Jr. and Laurence R. Grose.

He died from pneumonia on May 19, 1939 at Ballston Spa, New York.

== Writings ==
- The Endeavor Hymnal New York (1902)
- Aliens or Americans (1906)
- The Incoming Millions (1906)
- The Praise Book with George B. Graff, Boston, Massachusetts:, United Society of Christian Endeavor (1906)
- Advance to the Antilles (1910)
- Never Man So Spake (1924)
