= Lincoln Library of Essential Information =

Compact encyclopedia

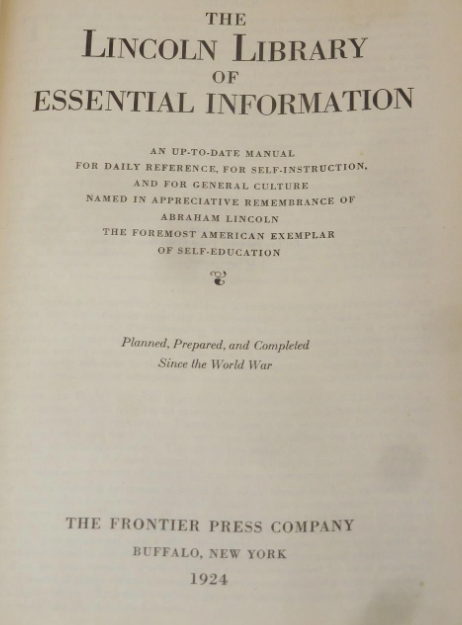
- Author: Michael J. Kinsella
- Language: English
- Genre: Encyclopedia
- Publisher: Lincoln Library
- Publication date: 1924
- Publication place: United States

The Lincoln Library of Essential Information was originally published as a one-volume general-reference work, in 1924. In later years, it was published in two- and three-volume editions, and the title was changed.

The first edition of the Lincoln Library of Essential Information was published in 1924 by the Frontier Press of Buffalo, New York. It had 2,054 pages and was compiled by Michael J. Kinsella. While primarily a one volume publication during this time, two volume versions of the book were available from 1928, with the full index reproduced in both volumes. The encyclopedia was topically arranged and revised at two year intervals. By the 27th edition, published in 1967, it had 3 million words and a 20,000 entry index. The set was named after Abraham Lincoln; as the title page said "Named in honor of Abraham Lincoln whose inspiring example illustrated the possibilities of self-education".

A "supermarket edition" of the Lincoln Library was published in 1969 in 14 slim volumes under the title Encyclopedia of World Knowledge, but this was quickly discontinued. In 1978 the encyclopedia expanded to three volumes and was rebranded the New Lincoln Library Encyclopedia, however this was discontinued in 1981 and the set went back to its old name and a two volume only format.

The 1985 edition of the Lincoln Library of Essential Information had 2,500 pages, 25,000 articles, 3.5 million words, 8,800 cross-references and a 75,000 entry index. There were 1,200 illustrations, the majority in black and white, and 140 maps, including a 48-page color atlas. Most of the illustrations were black and white photographs with the few in color being "various color plates scattered throughout." The articles were all unsigned and averaged 150 words in length or about eleven per page. 150 editors and contributors were listed at the beginning of the first volume. The set was topically arranged, containing 12 "departments" dedicated to broad subjects such as geography, history, literature, etc. The set tended to focus on historical and statistical information with a focus on science, social studies, literature and the visual arts. Areas such as religion, philosophy, psychology and psychiatry were "all but ignored". Controversial issues such as abortion, adoption, birth control, religious cults, capital punishment and homosexuality were avoided. Despite its continuous revision the set was criticized for being out of date - contemporary events were cataloged, but "standard material" did not keep pace.

The 1985 edition was to be the last for a while. After the last copies were sold in 1988 Frontier Press let the book go out of print. In the late 1980s and early 1990s some firms had expressed interest in buying the Lincoln Library of Essential Information brand, but by 1994 nothing had come of this.

In 2012 a 44th edition was published by Lincoln Library Press of Columbus, Ohio it was edited by Susan Bevan and Timothy L. Gall and contained 2,100 pages.

== Presidents ==
- M. J. Kinsella, 1924-1928
- Burt S. Kinsella, 1928-1948 (M. J.'s brother)
- H. C. Goff, 1948-1958
- Verne E. Seibert, 1958-1966
- William H. Seibert (Verne's son), 1966-?

== See also ==
- Standard Dictionary of Facts
- Volume Library
- New Century Book of Facts
- Columbia Encyclopedia
