= Merit Students Encyclopedia =

Merit Students Encyclopedia was a printed encyclopedia that was very similar to Collier's Encyclopedia, but was geared towards upper grade school through college level. It was printed by Crowell-Collier Educational Corporation from about 1967–1992 (1967 was cited from the 1969 edition). There were twenty volumes, with two volumes of a dictionary in the set.

The encyclopedia volumes are also arranged like a dictionary, with each volume being of a uniform size separated by words, instead of by the letter of the alphabet. There were also "Student Guides" which give a brief overview of certain topics. Also, "Highlights In History" (a printed timeline) and other graphs and headings make it easy to find information. There is a listing of "Books for Further Study" on certain articles. The topics are written by various authors, who are cited at the end.
