= Human Interest Library =

20th-century children's encyclopedia

The Human Interest Library was a children's encyclopedia published from the 1910s to at least the mid-1960s.

Originally published in 1914 by the Midland Press of Chicago, the encyclopedia was organized topically, with each of its four volumes dedicated to a broad subject area. The first edition boasted Henry Waldmar Ruoff and Bishop Samuel Fallows. Further editions appeared in 1922, 1925 (when the set was expanded to five volumes), 1925 and 1926, by which time Ruoof and Fallows had been succeeded by Silas Edgar Farquhar.

In 1928 Farquhar released an extensively revised and expanded version he had been working on. The New Human Interest Library was published in six volumes, five dedicated to a broad subject area with the sixth being a study guide. Further editions were published in 1933, 1935 and 1937. In 1938 the set was sold to Books Inc., a subsidiary of the Publisher's Company who kept the encyclopedia in print at least until the mid-1960s. Farquhar was listed as editor as late as a 1952 printing, but had severed ties with the set around 1930.

The last known printing of the encyclopedia was in 1968, under the imprint of the International Book Corporation of Miami. It had 7 volumes, 1.5 million words, 2,800 pages, 10,000 entries and 3,000 illustrations. It was finally reported out of print in 1972.
