= Jack's Reference Book for Home and Office =

British publication

The Jack's Reference Book for Home and Office was a periodically published compendium of general and practical information published in the United Kingdom from 1905 to 1936.

It was originally published as Everybody's Everyday Reference Book for Home and Office by Granville Press in 1905. It was published later that same year as Pannell's Reference Book for Home and Office and again under that name in 1906.

The publication was then bought out by Thomas and Edwin Chater Jack, who republished it in a revised and expanded edition in 1908 and subsequently until 1929 when the publication was acquired by Thomas Nelson and Sons. The final known edition was published in 1936.
