= Winston Universal Reference Library =

The Winston Universal Reference Library was a single-volume general reference work that was published from 1920 to the mid-1950s.

The book was original titled the New Universal Handbook of Necessary Information in 1920 by the Universal Book and Bible House of Philadelphia. The first edition had 1,046 pages and editors included William Henry Johnston, William Dodge Lewis and Edgar Arthur Singer. The book was published at regular intervals until 1937. It was also published under the title Universal Handbook. The book proved popular, but was not considered authoritative.

In 1930 the Universal Book and Bible House published the Winston Universal Reference Library, which was apparently an expanded and revised version of the previous book. This version had 1,500 pages and its editors included William Dodge Lewis, Harry Seidel Canby and Thomas Kite Brown. Under the Winston Universal Reference Library title, editions continued to be publish at least of 1964.
