= John Alexander Hammerton =

British journalist and writer (1871–1949)

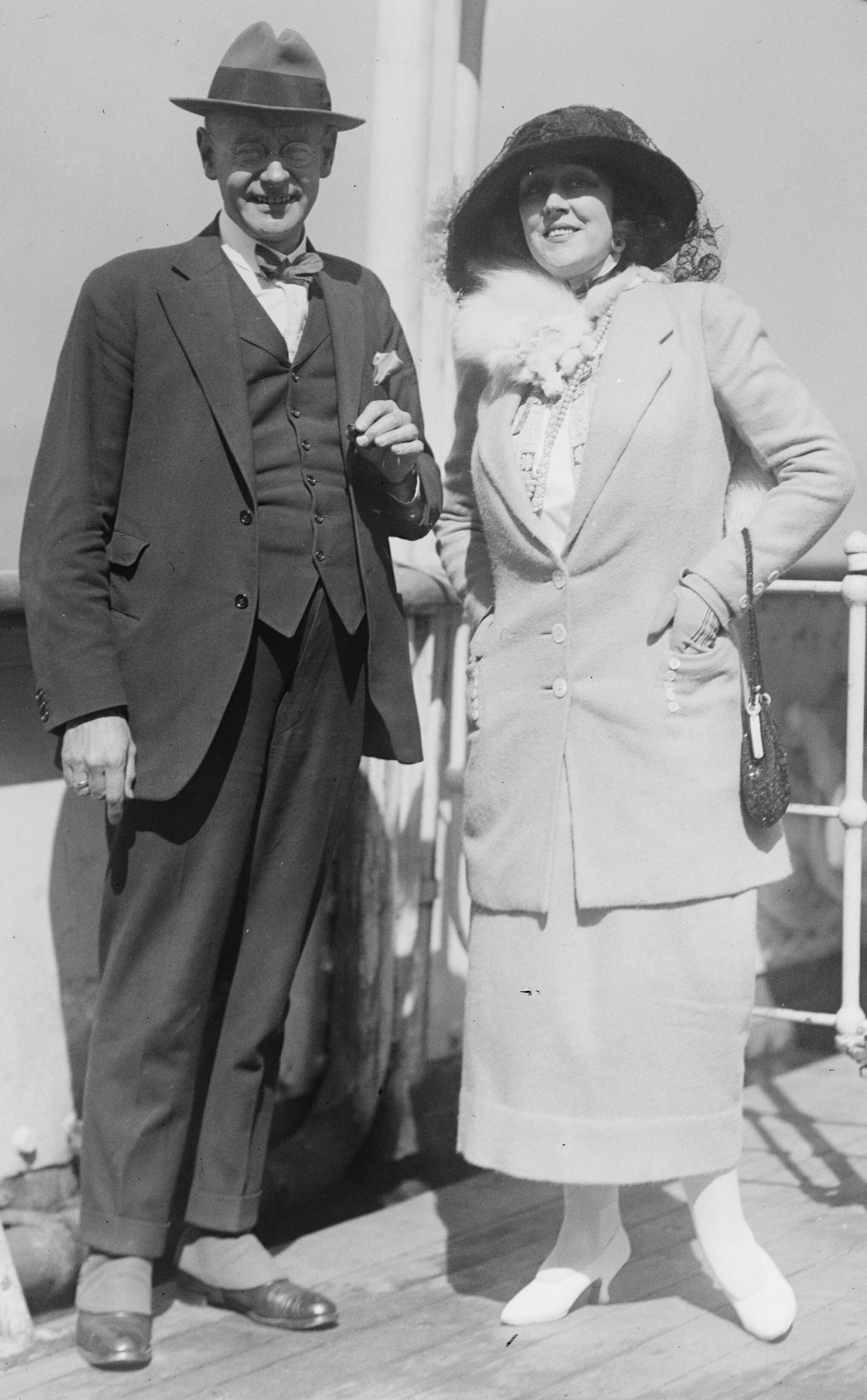
John Alexander Hammerton with Olga Petrova (1900)

Sir John Alexander Hammerton (27 February 1871, in Alexandria, Scotland – 12 May 1949, in London) is described by the Dictionary of National Biography as "the most successful creator of large-scale works of reference that Britain has known".

== Collaboration with Arthur Mee ==
Hammerton's first posts in journalism included a period in Nottingham, where he first met his lifelong collaborator and friend, Arthur Mee. In 1905, Hammerton joined Alfred Harmsworth's Amalgamated Press. He and Mee produced the Harmsworth Self-Educator.

== Work on encyclopedias ==
Hammerton contributed to the first edition of Mee's Children's Encyclopædia, which was a fortnightly series from 1908 till 1910 before being published in eight large volumes. Hammerton's contribution consisted of compiling articles on 'Famous Books' and 'Poetry'.

Hammerton's greatest achievement was Harmsworth's Universal Encyclopædia. It was published first as a fortnightly series from 1920 to 1922. The Encyclopaedia sold 12 million copies throughout the English-speaking world. Some of the content was reformatted as articles in a later six volume self improvement series by Hammerton entitled Practical Knowledge for All.

== Works about the First World War ==
=== The Great War ===
From 1914 to 1919, Hammerton was joint editor with Herbert Wrigley Wilson of the periodical The Great War: The Standard History of the All-Europe Conflict, published by the Amalgamated Press.

The first volume of The Great War concentrated on justifying Britain's entry into World War I, and with encouraging the British people to sign up and fight. In its entirety, The Great War ran to 13 volumes.

=== Popular History ===
In 1933, Hammerton's A Popular History of the Great War (in six volumes) was published. In his introduction to volume 1, Hammerton discusses the previous World War I series: 'Although it remains a storehouse of information for future students of the period, "The Great War", as that set of thirteen massive volumes was called, would now require to be largely re-written in light of later knowledge'.

Hammerton described Popular History as "embodying the gist of post-war revelations and official documents".

- Volume 1: The First Phase: 1914
- Volume 2: Extension of the Struggle: 1915
- Volume 3: The Allies at Bay: 1916
- Volume 4: A Year of Attrition: 1917
- Volume 5: The Year of Victory: 1918
- Volume 6: The Armistice and After

Popular History contains 3,840 pages of text, 100 maps and diagrams, and 800 photographs.

== Other works ==
In the Second World War, Hammerton edited "The Second Great War - A Standard History" (with Maj.-Gen. Sir Charles Gwynn acting a Military Editor). It was originally published in 104 parts, first fortnightly and then monthly for over five years, reverting to fortnightly in the last year of production. The collected editions were published in 9 volumes in 1947.

Hammerton later edited a biography of J. M. Barrie and studies of Charles Dickens and Robert Louis Stevenson. He also wrote Other Things than War: Musings and Memories (1943), and an autobiography, Books and Myself (1944). He edited Punch Library of Humour, a book series of volumes of selected Punch Magazine sketches, described as "cream of our national humour, contributed by the masters of the comic draughtsmanship and leading wits of the age to 'Punch'".

Arthur Mee died in 1943. Hammerton wrote a biography of him entitled Child of Wonder (Hodder & Stoughton, 1946).

== List of works ==
- Vol. 12: Peoples of All Nations: Their Life To-Day and the Story of Their Past (14 Vols.) (2007 ed.) – via Google Books (limited preview).
- Vol. 14: Peoples of All Nations: Their Life To-Day and the Story of Their Past (14 Vols.) (2007 ed.) – via Google Books (limited preview).
- Peoples of All Nations: Their Life To-Day and the Story of Their Past (7 Vols.). 1922–1924. LCCN 24-6018; OCLC 2003464 (all editions).
- Peoples of All Nations : Their Life Today and Story of Their Past (Photojournalist Account and Commentary Early Twentieth Century Anthropology - origins circa 1920)
- Vol. 6: Peoples of All Nations: Their Life To-Day and the Story of Their Past (1985 ed.) – via Google Books (limited preview).
- The World's Greatest Books (1910) with Mee.
- The War Illustrated (Hammerton, ed.).
