= Cassell's Book of Knowledge =

Eight volume Encyclopedia

Cassell's Book of Knowledge was an alphabetical eight-volume encyclopedia published under a range of titles including The Book of Knowledge and The New Book of Knowledge. The series was printed in London by The Waverley Book Company, Ltd. in various years beginning in 1922. The essays were written in a now dated style, but designed to appeal to both adults and children. The books were edited by multiple editors including Harold FB Wheeler (c. 1935), John Alexander Hammerton (c. 1950), and Gordon Stowell (1955). The New Book of Knowledge, an updated set, appeared circa 1959.
