= Harmsworth's Universal Encyclopaedia =

British encyclopaedia

Harmsworth's Universal Encyclopaedia is an encyclopedia edited by John Hammerton and published in London, England by The Education Book Co. Ltd., a subsidiary of Northcliffe's Amalgamated Press, in 1921/22.

Aimed at a middle-income market around the world, the main encyclopaedia is prefaced with a series of "New Horizons" articles penned by 'eminent publicists'. These include

- "Where we Stand" by John Galsworthy
- "The Nations and the New Era" by Lord Robert Cecil MP
- "Science and the Future" by Lord Moulton
- "The Aerial Age" by Viscount Northcliffe
- "Industry and the Future" by Lord Askwith
- "The Future of Labour" by George Nicoll Barnes.

== Editions ==
1. 1920–22 was initially published as a fortnightly series in 1920-22 and sold twelve million copies throughout the English-speaking world.

The subscriber could have the fortnightly magazines bound into volumes at a bookbinder's shop. There were several binding and decorative options according to how much the subscriber wished to pay: leather, cloth-covered board or plain board. The bookbinder marked the page numbers on the spine of each volume. This means sets are variable in binding and even in the number of volumes. The following have been noted:

1. Nine volumes bound in brown leather (a more expensive binding)
2. Nine volumes bound in red board with corrections (a cheaper binding)
3. Twelve volumes bound in brown board (a cheaper binding), 23,500 illustrations

=== The New Universal Encyclopedia ===
- 1949/50 First edition Ten volumes; John Hammerton was the editor of the first volume, but died a couple of weeks after it was completed.
- 1959 Revised edition Fifteen volumes, published by The Caxton Publishing Company Limited; revising editor: Gordon Stowell.
