= Charles Morris (American writer) =

American novelist

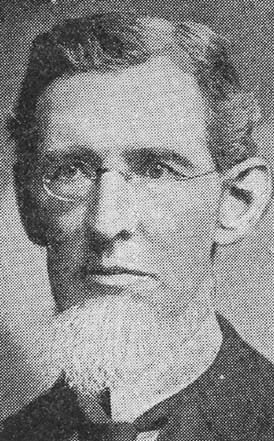
- Born: October 1, 1833; Chester, Pennsylvania
- Died: September 7, 1922 (aged 88); Philadelphia, Pennsylvania
- Occupations: Journalist; novelist; writer

Charles Morris (October 1, 1833 – September 7, 1922) was an American journalist, novelist and author of popular historical textbooks.

== Biography ==
He was born in Chester, Pennsylvania, the son of Samuel Pearson Morris and Margaret Burns. After studying locally he worked as a teacher in Chester, but in 1856 moved to Philadelphia where he became professor of languages at the Academy of Ancient and Modern Languages.

He abandoned his academic career in 1860, working in business up to 1878, while developing his reputation as a professional creative writer and journalist. He published short stories, poems, and serial novels in Beadle's Saturday Journal.

After becoming a full-time writer he published a large number of history textbooks, including The War with Spain, histories of the United States, a general History of the World, The Story of Mexico, and History of Pennsylvania. Other publications include Civilization, a Study of its Elements, The Aryan Race: its Origin and Achievements, The Greater Republic and the Dictionary of Universal Biography. He also compiled a series of Historical Tales. These are retold legends and historical events meant to be read for enjoyment rather than used as textbooks. He also wrote biographies, notably of Queen Victoria and William McKinley.

He edited collections of interviews with writers under the titles Half Hours with the Best American Authors and Half Hours with the Best British Authors.

Morris also wrote dime novels. As was common practice at the time, these were often published under a variety of pseudonyms. These names included, "Redmond Blake", "Edward Lytton", "Jo Pierce", "C. E. Tripp", "R. R. Inman", and "George S. Kaine", "Paul Preston", "William Murry", "E. L.Vincent", "J. H. Southard", "Roland Dare", "S. M. Frazier", "Hugh Allen", "J. D. Ballard", and "Paul Pastnor".

Immediately after the 1906 San Francisco earthquake, he was sent by his publisher to write a first-hand report on the event which was published as The San Francisco calamity by earthquake and fire.

Charles Morris died at his home in Philadelphia on September 7, 1922.

== Selected publications ==
- The Aryan Race: Its Origins and its Achievements (1888)
- Tales From the Dramatists, 1580 to 1780 (1898)
- A New History of the United States. The Greater Republic (1899)
- Our Island Empire: A Hand-Book of Cuba, Porto Rico, Hawaii, and the Philippine Islands (1899)
- The War With Spain: A Complete History of the War of 1898 Between the United States and Spain (1899)
- The Wonderful Century, 1800-1900: Its History and Progress (1899)
- Man and His Ancestor: A Study in Evolution (1900)
- The Handy Dictionary of Biography (1901)
- The Gallant Deeds of Our Naval Heroes Told for Boys and Girls (1902)
- The History of Pennsylvania (1913)
- Primary History of the United States: The Story of Our Country for Young Folks (1913)
- An Elementary History of the United States (1915)
- Famous Days and Deeds in Holland and Belgium (1915)
- Heroes of the Army in America (1919)
- [The Child's Story of America] (1901)
