= Collins Concise Encyclopedia =

Encyclopedia

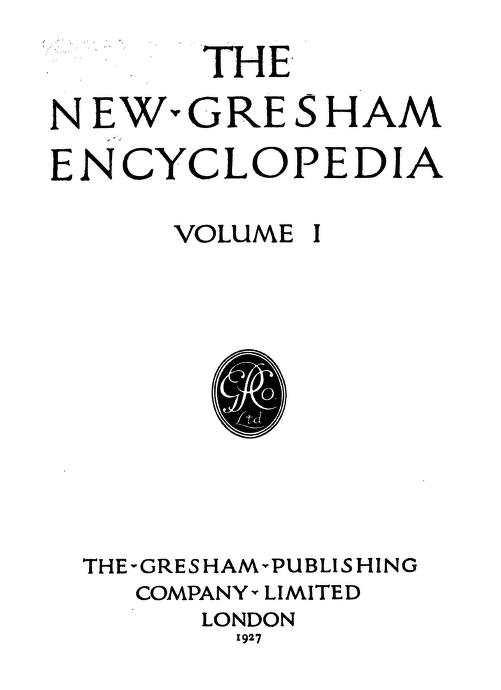
- Title page of the original volume
- Genre: Encyclopedia

Collins Concise Encyclopaedia was the most common name for an encyclopedia that was published in various formats and names from 1921 until at least the early 1990s.

The set was originally published in 1921–1924 as the New Gresham Encyclopedia in 12 volumes, by the Gresham Publishing Company of London. Its editors were Angelo Solomon Rappaport, Richard Ferrer Patterson and John Dougall. An abridged 6-volume edition was published in 1927 as the Compact Encyclopedia by the same company and the latter two editors. It contained about half the material as the original edition.

In 1933 it was published again, but now by Collins Publishers, of London. This edition was in 10 volumes and edited by John Maxi Parish. It was also republished the same year as The British Encyclopedia by Odhams Press. The content consisted of brief, unsigned articles and the encyclopedia was considered mediocre in quality.

From 1933 to 1976 it was published in the United Kingdom as Collins Concise Encyclopedia, apparently as a work "of no great reputation", according to Kenneth Kister. In 1979 an abridged 2 volume pocket sized (8 by 12 cm, 3.25 by 4.75 in) edition was published as Collins Gem Encyclopedia. It was distributed in the United States by Simon and Schuster. A revised edition was published in 1980. the set had 1,125 pages, 450,000 words, and 14,000 articles. The articles averaged 32 words each, about 12 or 13 per page and were all unsigned. There were 5,000 cross references, but no index. There were no maps or illustrations, either. An editorial staff of five was listed. The subject coverage was broad, but superficial. For instance, Pearl Harbor only had a parenthetical note in the article on Hawaii mentioning that it was attacked by the Japanese during World War, bringing the US into the Second World War. Controversial subjects such as abortion and Scientology were handled superficially, the former simply had a 40 word medical definition and the latter adding the "controversial practices have led to official inquiries in some countries", and nothing else about the controversies surrounding the group. Like all entries in the Collins GEM series, it had a flexible, vinyl cover. The set went out of print in the US and Canada in 1987.

In 1993 an abridged version of Collins Gem was published as one volume general encyclopedia. It the United States it was titled Running Press Cyclopedia, after its publisher Running Press. It kept the name Collins Gem Encyclopedia in the United Kingdom, but was a very different item than its predecessor. The new volume was topically arranged, had 638 pages, 300 articles and 100,000 words. There were no cross references, but there was an index with 750 entries. Its physical dimensions were 4.25 by 5.25 inches. Like its predecessor it was a paperback. The most notable different was the presence of illustrations - the new edition counted 800 line drawings, tables, charts, cutaways and timelines. These were printed in two colors by the Diagram Group. Much of the information which the encyclopedia contained was presented visually through these graphics. The only mention of Galileo, for example, was on a history timetable where it is mentioned that he was forced to renounce Copernican theory in 1633. (Unfortunately, information presented in the illustrations such as this was not indexed.) The book focused heavily on science; Part 4, the section on the physical sciences, took up nearly half the book. Subjects such as the Dead Sea Scrolls, Apartheid, adoption, abortion, economic depression, psychological depression, Scientology or panda bears were completely missing.

== See also ==
- List of Collins GEM books
