= American Educator (encyclopedia) =

1900s encyclopedia set

American Educator was the most common name for an encyclopedia set that was published in the United States from 1901 to the 1970s.

== Predecessors ==
The encyclopedia was originally published in 1901 as Hill's Practical Encyclopedia in four volumes. The "supervisor" was Thomas Edie Hill, while the "editor" was L. Brent Vaughn. Simultaneously the set was also published as the School Library Encyclopedia, but under a different imprint. The next year both versions of the encyclopedia were reprinted, as well as a third entitled Hill's Practical Library of General Knowledge. It would be reprinted under the latter name again in 1904 and 1905.

In 1907 the encyclopedia was published again as the New Practical Reference Library, this time in six volumes and published by Dixon, Hanson and Company of Chicago and New York. The staff for this edition included Charles Herbert Sylvester, William Francis Rocheleau, Kenneth L. Pray, Anna McCaleb, Helga M. Leburg and Albertus V. Smith. Thomas Hill was notably absent. The set was republished again in 1911 under the imprint of Dixon, Hanson and Bellows. The editions of 1913, 1914 and 1915 were published under the imprint of Hanson-Bellows and in 1917 under the imprint of Hanson-Roach-Fowler. This was significant, because that same firm published the first edition of the World Book Encyclopedia the same year, and the two shared basically the same staff, including Ellsworth Decatur Foster. The final edition of the New Practical Reference Library was published in 1918. In 1919 the encyclopedia was acquired by Ralph Durham Company, revised and published as the American Educator.

== American Educator ==
The first edition under the American Educator title was published in eight volumes in 1919. A revised edition was published in 1922 and other followed in 1923, 1924, 1925 and 1926, with slight changes in the subtitles and the name of the publisher. After a period of revision in 1927, new, 10 volume editions were published in 1929 and 1930. In 1931 the encyclopedia was bought out by United Educators, Inc. and the name changed to American Educator Encyclopedia, beginning with the 1932 edition. Since then the work was published under continuous revision, eschewing new editions for continuously publishing and revising the work annually.

In 1957 it was available in both 10 or 14 volume editions, the latter including "supplementary material on Nature, Recreation, Hobbies and a Study Guide." This was discontinued by 1965 when the set was only available in 14 volumes without the supplements. After its final revision in 1972 the set had 20 volumes. The set was discontinued in 1977.

At the time of its final printing the encyclopedia had 7,750 pages, 13,000 articles and approximately 5 million words. The articles averaged just under 400 words, and were mostly unsigned. There were 16,000 cross references 693 maps and 12,000 illustrations, 15% of which were in color.

== Reputation ==
While the encyclopedia claimed to have more Nobel Prize winners among its contributors than any other in the world, its reputation was decidedly mixed. In the late 1960s it was called "one of the better small, family encyclopedias in the United States", by the time of its discontinuation it was considered a substandard compared to its competitors.

The sets reputation was also marred by complaints to the Federal Trade Commission about the practices of the encyclopedias vendors. These were Cease and Desist Orders Docket #3349 in 1938, #3428 in 1939 and #4554 in 1942.

Despite its annual revision, the encyclopedia was often out of date due to lax and inconstant editing. The quality of the articles themselves was often superficial, incomplete or inaccurate. Some controversial subjects such as abortion were not mentioned at all. The cross references were erratic and there was no index, hampering the encyclopedia's ease of use. The quality of the illustrations was described as "from mediocre to poor" and the physical layout was considered "drab and uninviting." Nevertheless, the articles were often clear and economical, and could be useful to those who could read at the junior and high school reading levels.

== Canadian editions ==
The American Educator was published as the Dominion Educator in Canada in 1919. It was re-issued in 1935 as the New General Encyclopedia.
