= New Century Book of Facts =

The New Century Book of Facts was a single volume general reference work published in the United States from 1909 to 1964.

The publication began as the Century Book of Facts in 1902 by the King-Richardson Company of Springfield and Chicago and edited by Henry Walmar Ruoff. Further editions were published in 1905, 1906 and 1908. The Universal Manual of Ready Reference, published in 1904 was basically the same work. The moniker New Century Book of Facts was adopted in 1909 and the book continued to be published by King-Richardson until 1926 when it was bought out by Continental Publishing Company of Wheeling, West Virginia. It 1964 the publication was bought out by a New York firm with the intention of publishing a new completely revised edition. However, this did not materialized by the scheduled date of 1972 and the publication became defunct.

== See also ==
- Lincoln Library of Essential Information
