= List of AP, Fleetway and IPC Comics publications =

A list of the story papers and comic books published by Amalgamated Press, Fleetway Publications, IPC Magazines and Rebellion Developments.

== Juvenile magazines ==
For reasons of clarity, only the original name of each title is listed; for the various names used throughout each publication's life see their individual pages.

Title	Start	End	Issues (Note: Some titles underwent unplanned hiatus for wartime paper rationing and/or industrial action, so the number of issues may not always tally with the periods between dates)	Merged into	Notes
Comic Cuts	17 May 1890	12 September 1953	3006	Knockout	
Illustrated Chips	26 July 1890	12 September 1953	2997	Film Fun	
The Gem	16 March 1907	30 December 1939	1711 (Note: Cumulative total from consecutive volumes)		
The Magnet	15 February 1908	18 May 1940	1683	Knockout	
The Nelson Lee Library	12 June 1915	12 August 1933	956 (Note: Cumulative total from consecutive volumes)	The Gem	
School Friend	17 May 1919	27 July 1929	532 (Note: Cumulative total from consecutive volumes)		
Film Fun	17 January 1920	15 September 1962	2225	Buster	
The Champion	28 January 1922	19 March 1955	1729	Tiger	
The Schoolgirl	21 February 1922	13 March 1923	56		
Playbox	14 February 1925	11 June 1955		Jack and Jill	
The Schoolgirl	3 August 1929	18 May 1940	564	Girls' Crystal	
Girls' Crystal	26 October 1935	18 May 1963	1432	School Friend	Transformed from a story paper into a comic in 1953.
Radio Fun	15 October 1938	18 February 1961	1667	Buster	
The Knock-out	2 March 1939	16 February 1963	1227	Valiant	
The Comet	31 May 1949	17 October 1959	509 (Note: 71 fortnightly issues previously published by J.B. Allen from 20 September 1946 to 24 May 1949)	Tiger	Previously published by J.B. Allen.
Sun	31 May 1949	17 October 1959	509 (Note: 49 fortnightly issues previously published by J.B. Allen from 21 November 1947 to 24 May 1949)	Lion	Previously published by J.B. Allen.
School Friend	20 May 1950	23 January 1965	766	June	
Lion	23 February 1952	18 May 1974	1156	Valiant	
Jack and Jill	27 February 1954	29 June 1985	1640		
Tiger	11 September 1954	30 March 1985	1554	Eagle	
Marilyn	19 March 1955	18 November 1965	547 or 549	Valentine	
Mirabelle	10 September 1956	22 October 1977	1103	Pink	
Valentine	19 January 1957	9 November 1974	922	Mirabelle	
Roxy	15 March 1958	14 September 1963	288	Valentine	
Harold Hare's Own Paper	14 November 1959	4 April 1964	230		
Princess	30 January 1960	16 September 1967	399	Tina	
Buster	28 May 1960	4 January 2000	1902		
June	18 March 1961	15 June 1974	399	Tammy	
Look and Learn	15 January 1962	17 April 1982	1049		
Serenade	22 September 1962	9 February 1963	21	Valentine	
Valiant	6 October 1962	10 October 1976	714	Battle	
Hurricane	29 February 1964	8 May 1965	63	Tiger	
The Big One	17 October 1964	10 February 1965	19	Buster	
Ranger	18 September 1965	18 June 1966	40	Look and Learn	
The Champion	22 February 1966	4 June 1966	15	Lion	
Eagle	6 May 1967	26 April 1969	104 (Note: 883 issues previously published by Hulton Press from 14 April 1950 to 27 December 1958 and Odhams Press from 3 January 1959 to 29 April 1967)	Lion	Previously published by Hulton Press and Odhams Press.
Princess Tina	23 September 1967	18 August 1973	256	Pink	
Jag	4 May 1968	29 March 1969	48	Tiger	
Smash!	4 May 1968	3 April 1971	104 (Note: 153 issues previously published by Odhams Press from 5 February 1966 to 27 April 1968.)	Valiant	Previously published by Odhams Press.
Whizzer and Chips	18 October 1969	27 October 1990	1092	Buster	
Scorcher	10 January 1970	5 October 1974	125	Tiger	
World of Wonder	28 March 1970	1 March 1975	258	Look and Learn	
Cor!!	6 June 1970	15 June 1974	210	Buster	
Score 'n' Roar	19 September 1970	26 June 1971	41	Scorcher	
Thunder	17 October 1970	13 March 1971	22	Lion	
Tammy	6 February 1971	23 June 1984	689	Girl	
Jet	1 May 1971	25 September 1971	22	Buster	
Knockout	12 June 1971	23 June 1973	106	Whizzer and Chips	
Sandie	12 February 1972	20 October 1973	89	Tammy	
Shiver and Shake	10 March 1973	5 October 1974	79	Whoopee!	
Whoopee!	9 March 1974	30 May 1985	572	Whizzer and Chips	
Jinty	11 May 1974	21 November 1981	393	Tammy	
Vulcan	1 March 1975	3 April 1976	58	Valiant	Scotland only until 27 September 1975.
Battle Picture Weekly	8 March 1975	23 January 1988	664	Eagle	
Monster Fun	14 June 1975	30 October 1976	73	Buster	
Action	14 February 1976	12 November 1977	86	Battle	Suspended between 16 October and 4 December 1976.
Roy of the Rovers	25 September 1976	20 March 1993	853		
Krazy	16 October 1976	15 April 1978	79	Whoopee!	
2000 AD	26 February 1977	Ongoing	2337 (Note: As of May 2023)		
Cheeky Weekly	22 October 1977	2 February 1980	117	Whoopee!	
Misty	4 February 1978	12 January 1980	101	Tammy	
Starlord	13 May 1978	7 October 1978	22	2000 AD	
Tornado	24 March 1979	18 August 1979	22	2000 AD	
Jackpot	5 May 1979	30 January 1982	141	Buster	
Speed	23 February 1980	25 October 1980	31	Tiger	
Girl	14 February 1981	March 1990	478	My Guy	
Dreamer	19 September 1981	15 May 1982	35	Girl	
Eagle	27 March 1982	January 1994	505		Monthly from May 1991.
Wow!	5 June 1982	25 June 1983	56	Whoopee!	
Scream!	24 March 1984	30 June 1984	15	Eagle	
Diceman	February 1986	October 1986	5		Monthly
Oink	3 May 1986	November 1988	88	Buster	Initially fortnightly, then weekly, then monthly.
M.A.S.K.	25 October 1986	22 October 1988	80	Eagle	Fortnightly until 10 October 1987
Nipper	31 January 1987	12 September 1987	16	Buster	Fortnightly
Supernaturals	31 October 1987	20 February 1988	9		Fortnightly
Gary Lineker's Hot-Shot!	13 August 1988	28 January 1989	25	Roy of the Rovers	
Crisis	17 September 1988	September 1990	63		Fortnightly, then monthly from September 1990
Wildcat	22 October 1988	25 March 1988	12	Eagle	
Ring Raiders	18 February 1989	25 November 1989	6		Fortnightly
Revolver	July 1990	January 1991	7	Crisis	Monthly
Thunderbirds: The Comic	19 October 1991	29 April 1994	66		Fortnightly
Judge Dredd Megazine	15 May 1992	Ongoing	444 (Note: As of May 2023)		Fortnightly and later monthly
Sonic the Comic	29 May 1993	9 January 2002	223		Fortnightly
Transformers: Generation 2	October 1994	March 1995	5		Monthly

== Picture Libraries ==
Title	Start	End	Issues	Notes
Cowboy Picture Library	April 1950	February 1957	204	
Thriller Comics	November 1951	May 1963	450	
Love Story Library	August 1952		1656	
Super-Detective Library	March 1953		154	
True Life Library	1954	December 1970	769	
Schoolgirls Picture Library	July 1957	1965	327	
War Picture Library	September 1958	December 1984	2103	
Air Ace Picture Library	January 1960	November 1970	545	Merged with War Picture Library
Battle Picture Library	January 1961	November 1984	1706	
Tiger Sports Library	July 1961		12	
Princess Picture Library	1961	1966	118	
Schoolfriend Picture Library	1962	1965	39	
War at Sea Picture Library	1962	1963	36	
Lion Picture Library	October 1963	May 1969	136	
Valiant Picture Library	June 1963	May 1969	144	
June and Schoolfriend Picture Library	1965			
Wild West Picture Library	May 1966	December 1970	112	
Buster Adventure Library	1966	1967	36	
Super Library Fantastic Series	January 1967	January 1968	22	
Action Picture Library	August 1969	October 1970	30	Merged with War Picture Library
Top Secret Picture Library	July 1974		40	
Space Picture Library	May 1977	1981		
Eagle Picture Library	1985	1985	14	
Battle Picture Library	January 1985	November 1992	349	
