= School Friend (story paper) =

British story paper for girls

The School Friend
- The cover of The School Friend vol. 9, no. 231 (Oct. 13, 1923).
- Editor: Reg Eves
- Illustrator: G. M. Dodshon
- Staff writers: Charles Hamilton; R. S. Kirkham; Horace Phillips; L. E. Ransome
- Frequency: Weekly (every Thursday)
- Publisher: Amalgamated Press
- First issue: 1919
- Final issue Number: 1929; 532
- Country: United Kingdom
- Based in: London
- Language: English

School Friend was the name of a pioneering story paper marketed exclusively to girls, published from 1919 to 1929. The name was later used by Amalgamated Press on a girls' comic (also the first of its kind) in 1950.

The story paper focused on the Cliff House School for Girls, a fictional school first introduced ten years earlier in the boys' story paper The Magnet. With the success of Amalgamated Press (AP)'s boys' story papers like The Magnet and The Gem, the publisher was seeking to expand into new markets. AP editor Reg Eves, impressed by the letters he received from female readers of The Magnet, launched School Friend in 1919, becoming its first editor.

The School Friend was published in two series, from 17 May 1919 to 28 February 1925, for a total of 303 issues; and 7 March 1925 to 27 July 1929 for a total of 229 issues. (The series resumed the next week in the new publication The Schoolgirl.) Regular characters in the Cliff House stories included Billy Bunter's sister, Bessie Bunter, and Majorie Hazeldene, both having been introduced in The Magnet; and new characters Barbara "Babs" Redfern, Clara Trevlyn, Mabs Lynn, Phyllis Howell, Pand Philippa Derwent.

Despite the female audience, Eves primarily used male writers, such as Charles Hamilton, whom he was familiar with from the boys' papers. Hamilton created and introduced most of School Friend's main characters; he wrote issues 1–4, 9, and 11, before he was pulled back to write full time at The Magnet. Later writers for School Friend were R.S. Kirkham, Horace Phillips, (Note: Horace Phillips left School Friend in 1921 to focus on writing his own creation, Morcove School, in Schoolgirls' Own.) and L. E. Ransome (who wrote most Cliff House stories in the second half of the 1920s). Following the same practice as used in The Magnet, all stories in School Friend were written under the pen name "Hilda Richards" — she being the supposed sister of The Magnet's "Frank Richards."

Cliff House lost its cover feature status in the publication's second series, 1925 to 1929; School Friend's 1929 cancellation led to the relaunched girls' story paper, The Schoolgirl, which again featured Cliff House stories. The Schoolgirl continued until 18 May 1940, when paper rationing during the Second World War resulted in its merger with the fellow girls' story paper Girls' Crystal (which had debuted in 1935).

== Sources ==
- Keen, Tommy (1979). "Cliff House, Cliff House, Cliff House and Morcove" (PDF). Collectors' Digest Annual. pp. 48–55 – via Friardale website.
