= Bessie Bunter =

- First appearance: The Magnet #582 (April 1919)
- Created by: Charles Hamilton writing as Frank Richards

In-universe information
- Full name: Elizabeth Gertrude Bunter
- Nickname: Bessie
- Gender: Girl
- Occupation: Schoolgirl
- Family: William Samuel Bunter (father); Amelia Bunter (mother); Billy Bunter (brother); Sammy Bunter (brother)
- Relatives: Eliza Bunter (great-aunt); Calude Bunter (uncle); George Bunter (uncle); James Bunter (uncle); Claribel Bunter (aunt); Primrose Bunter (aunt); Humphrey Carter (uncle); Wally Bunter (cousin)
- Religion: Church of England
- Nationality: British
- School: Greyfriars School

Elizabeth Gertrude Bunter, better known as Bessie Bunter, is a fictional character created by Charles Hamilton, who also created her more famous brother Billy Bunter.

== History ==
Bessie Bunter

Bessie Bunter of Cliff House

Billy Bunter was a central character in the Greyfriars School stories which appeared in the boys' story paper The Magnet from 1907 to 1940, and Bessie's first appearance was in a 1919 Greyfriars story. She was a pupil of Cliff House School, a girls' school near Greyfriars.

In 1919, attempting to replicate the success of The Magnet, Amalgamated Press decided to bring out a new magazine for girls called The School Friend (later continued as The Schoolgirl), which included stories about Cliff House originally by Hamilton, using the pen name "Hilda Richards," supposedly the sister of "Frank Richards." Hamilton could only manage six stories before C. M. Down as The Magnet editor pulled him up for lack of copy - henceforth The School Friend had to manage without him. Hamilton’s contributions were issues Nos 1-4, and 9 and 11.

The stories were soon taken over by other authors, also using the name Hilda Richards. The most prolific of these substitute writers was John W. Wheway, who wrote well over 500 Cliff House stories between 1931 and 1940.

Hamilton wrote one more Cliff House story, in 1949, called "Bessie Bunter of Cliff House School", and published by Cassell.

The character also appeared in comic strip format in the School Friend comic book, which was published from 1950 to 1965; she later moved to June, and, when that title ended, moved to Tammy.

In addition, she featured as an adult character in The League of Extraordinary Gentlemen: Black Dossier where she married the former Greyfriars schoolboy Harry Wharton.

== Character ==
Bessie Bunter was essentially a female counterpart to her brother Billy, sharing many characteristics with her brother, including her large size and large appetite. She was as unappealing as her brother Billy, being conceited, untruthful, gluttonous and obese, but she was rather more domineering than he was and would usually impose her will by nagging, or, in the case of her brothers, by administering hefty slaps to the head.

== Sources ==
- Cadogan, Mary; Craig, Patricia (1976), You're a Brick Angela, London: Gollancz
- Cadogan, Mary (1988), Frank Richards – The Chap Behind The Chums, Middlesex: Viking
- Hamilton Wright, Una; McCall, Peter (2006), The Far Side of Billy Bunter: the Biography of Charles Hamilton, London: Friars Library
- Lofts, W. O. G.; Adley, D. J. (1975), The World of Frank Richards, London: Howard Baker
- Richards, Frank (1962), The Autobiography of Frank Richards, London: Skilton
- Richards, Jeffery (1991), Happiest Days: Public Schools in English Fiction, Manchester: Manchester University Press
