= Charles Ray (editor) =

British editor

Charles Ray (1875–1962) was a prolific editor of encyclopedic works, mainly for children, especially during the 1930s. Charles Ray worked as editor with Amalgamated Press in London, and he contributed to The Children's Newspaper edited by Arthur Mee from 1919, and possibly also to the earlier Children's Encyclopaedia (1908–1910).

== Family and personal life ==
His father was Charles James Ray (1848–1913), a boot manufacturer, and his mother was Lizzie Harvey (1851–1887). He was born in Stepney, London in 1874, and he married Florence probably around 1900. According to the 1911 Census, they had three sons and one daughter. They were Charles Aylward Ray (1902–1997), who was an industrial chemist; Kenneth Alfred Ray (born around 1906); Florence Margaret Ray (born around 1905); and Lawrence Arthur Ray (born around 1910). He retired in 1939 aged 65, and he died in Cromer, Norfolk, on 8 June 1962.

== Publications ==
=== Books ===
- The Life of Charles Haddon Spurgeon, with an introduction by Pastor Thomas Spurgeon. London: Isbister and Co Ltd; London: Passmore & Alabaster, 1903.
- Mrs. C. H. Spurgeon. [A biography.] (Contributor: Susannah Spurgeon) London: Passmore & Alabaster, 1903.
- A Marvellous Ministry. The story of C. H. Spurgeon's sermons, from 1855 to 1905. London: Passmore & Alabaster, 1905.

=== Edited works ===
- The World of Wonder. 10,000 things every child should know. London: Amalgamated Press, 1932–1933.
- The Boy's Book of Popular Science. London: Amalgamated Press, 1934.
- The Romance of the Nation. A stirring pageant of the British peoples through all the ages. 2 vol. London: Amalgamated Press, 1934–35.
- The Nursery Rhyme Omnibus. A collection of more than six hundred of the traditional nursery rhymes of Great Britain. London: Amalgamated Press, [1935].
- The Boy's Book of Wonder and Invention. London: Amalgamated Press, [1935].
- The Popular Science Educator. London: Amalgamated Press, 1935–36.
- The Boy's Book of Everyday Science. London : Amalgamated Press, [1936]
- The Book of the Great Adventurers. London: Amalgamated Press, [1937]
- The Boy's Book of Mechanics and Experiment. London: Amalgamated Press, [1937]
- Everybody's Enquire Within. [With illustrations.] London: Amalgamated Press, 1937–38.
- Outline of Progress. The stirring story of man's achievement through the ages. [With plates.] London: Amalgamated Press, 1939.
