= List of early-20th-century British children's magazines and annuals =

Numerous magazines and annuals for children were published in Britain from the mid-19th century onward. Many of the magazines produced their own annuals, which sometimes shared the name of the magazine exactly, as Little Folks, or slightly modified, as The Boy's Own Paper and The Girl's Own Paper (first-listed below).

This list includes magazines that started before or finished after the period 1900 to 1949.

- The Boy's Own Paper and Boy's Own Annual (1879–1967)
- The Girl's Own Paper and Girl's Own Annual (1880–1956)
- Jabberwock: A Monthly Magazine for Boys and Girls (1905–07)
- The Magnet (1908–40)
- Schoolgirl's Own Annual (1921–36)
- Greyfriars Holiday Annual (1920s)
- British Girl's Annual (1920s)
- Hulton's Girls' Stories (1920s)
- Mrs Strang's Annual (1919–26)
- Oxford Annual for Girls (1927–39)
- Little Folks (1871–1932)
- The Dandy (1937–)
- The Beano (1938–)
- The Gem (1907–39)
- Girls' Friend (1899–1931)
- Girls' Realm (1890s–1914)
- School Friend (1919–29)
- Schoolgirl (1929–40)
- Rover (1922–73)
- Hotspur (1933–81)
- Modern Wonder (1930s and early 1940s)
- Wizard (1922–80s)
- The Children's Newspaper (1919–65)
- Every Girl's Magazine (1878–?)
- The Lion Annual (1954–82)
- The Children's Garden (1900–1905)
- The Children's Realm (1906–1914)

== See also ==
- British comics
