= Schoolgirls' Own =

British magazine

- Illustrator: Leonard Shields
- Staff writers: Horace Phillips (as "Marjorie Stanton")
- Frequency: Weekly
- Publisher: Amalgamated Press
- First issue: February 1921
- Final issue Number: May 1936; 798
- Country: United Kingdom
- Language: English

The Schoolgirls' Own was a British weekly story paper aimed at girls. Published by Amalgamated Press, it was launched in February 1921 and ran for 798 issues until May 1936, when it was merged with a sister publication.

The main feature centred on the Morcove School, a "high class" girls' boarding school for the daughters of the aristocratic and the rich, although the school did also accept some pupils from working-class backgrounds. Cookery and needlework were also featured regularly, as it was at that time "considered vital that young girls knew how to cook and sew." All the Morcove stories were by Horace Phillips, using the pen name of "Marjorie Stanton."

The Friardale Website described Schoolgirls' Own thus:

The Schoolgirls' Own was . . . started by the Amalgamated Press as a companion paper to the successful School Friend for the girls' story paper market in the same manner as The Gem and [The] Magnet were for the boys, but as those two also had their girl readers, [Schoolgirls' Own] also drew many boy readers. This was partly down to [Schoolgirls' Own] having a very attractive appearance, Leonard Shields drew the covers (when not used as adverts instead), and interior for the Morcove stories throughout its run, which very much added to and contrasted well with Marjorie Stanton's (Horace Philips) writings. Phillips, whose writing style could be very Victorian sentimentalist in outlook, took his chance when offered by the AP to create his own fictional school — Morcove School in Devon, basing some of his characters in part on successful ones created by Charles Hamilton for the boys' papers. The main characters revolved around Betty Barton - the whole saga really began with her coming to Morcove from Lancashire as a penniless scholarship girl . . ., doing her best to overcome adversity and eventually winning, to ultimately get voted Fourth Form Captain. Over the years there were many adventures and many ups and downs, but she maintained her position as a more demure Tom Merry — "We'll manage" becoming a kind of catchphrase for her. She established a circle of friends that became known as the Study no. 12 coterie, staunch friends being madcap Polly Linton (almost Bob Cherry), languid Paula Creel (a feminine [Augustus] D'Arcy), and later playful Naomer Nakara arrived in a Hurree Singh role. Plus Dolly, Madge, Tess, and in the early days, Trixie. In the late '20's the ultra-sophisticated Pam Willoughby arrived, who turned out the last major character to be introduced into the stories. On the baddies side there was at the first Cora and Judith Grandways, replaced in the '30's with the carbon-copy scheming Denver sisters. There were many more regulars, all part of a delightful little old-fashioned world.

In 1936 Schoolgirls' Own was merged into its sister story paper The Schoolgirl and the Morcove stories moved to The Schoolgirl as the backup feature for two years before being quietly dropped. The last Morcove story appeared in the 1938 Schoolgirl's Own annual; Schoolgirls' Own Library reprints of Morcove stories carried on until 1940 when it was canceled as well.
