= Hinkins =

Hinkins is a surname. Notable people with the surname include:

- David Hinkins, American politician
- Frank Hinkins (1852–1934), English writer, photographer and illustrator
- John-Roger Hinkins (1934–2014), American writer and founder of the Movement of Spiritual Inner Awareness
- Susan Hinkins, American statistician
