= Alex Akerbladh =

Swedish-born British comics artist

"Lupino Lane" comic strip, drawn by Alex Akerbladh, from Film Fun, 1927

Alexander (Alex) Akerbladh (25 April 1886 – 1958) was a Swedish-born comics artist who drew for the Amalgamated Press in the UK from the 1900s to the 1950s. Born in Sundsvall, Sweden on 25 April 1886, he studied architecture at Glasgow School of Art, and became an apprentice to Sir John James Burnet for seven years, before studying art at the St John's Wood Art School in London under Leonard Walker, and in Munich under Anton Binder in 1916. He painted interiors and figures in oils and watercolours.

His earliest known comics work was "Hounslow Heath the Highwayman" for Illustrated Chips in 1909. In 1916 he drew a celebrity comic based on vaudeville comedian Little Tich. He went on to draw for many titles from then until the late 1930s, including Comic Cuts, Firefly, Jester, Kinema Comic, Sports Fun, Butterfly, Larks, Merry and Bright, Jingles and Crackers, including painting covers for Crackers annuals. From the late 1930s to the early 1950s his work appeared primarily in Radio Fun, where he drew "Flanagan and Allen", "Bob Hope and Jerry Colonna", and "Arthur Askey and Anthea". His last known work was for TV Fun in 1953.

A freelancer, he worked from home, and his pages are said to have arrived at the AP "in grubby condition, with no trouble taken to erase pencil marks or spilled ink". He lived for a time in France, and is believed to have retired to South Africa, where he died in 1958.
