= John Jukes (cartoonist) =

English cartoonist

John Jukes (1900–1972) was an English artist notable for his work in British comics.

Jukes was born in Ladywood. He was a contemporary of Arthur Ferrier at art school. He worked for the Amalgamated Press from the 1920s to the 1950s. Amongst others he drew for Comic Cuts, Funny Wonder, Radio Fun and Whizzer and Chips. He died in Cornwall on 31 October 1972. He is the grandfather of the author and journalist Peter Jukes
