= Hugo Tyerman =

British journalist and writer (1880–1977)

Hugo Nelson Tyerman (27 December 1880 – 7 September 1977) was a noted British journalist and writer, described by The Times as "the doyen of Fleet Street Educational Journalists".

== Biography ==
Born on 27 December 1880, Hugo Tyerman was educated at Bedford School, between 1889 and 1898, where his father, Nelson Rich Tyerman, a noted Victorian poet, was a master. He was named after Victor Hugo, with whom Nelson Rich Tyerman regularly corresponded whilst completing some of the first English translations of Hugo's sonnets. His journalistic career began in 1898 when he joined Sir Isaac Pitman and Son, moving from there to Cassells, and then to the Harmsworth Group (later to become the Amalgamated Press) and commencing his long association with Arthur Mee. Tyerman was responsible for producing My Magazine and was Art Editor of The Children's Encyclopædia, a publication which he was later to revise and update. In 1919, the first edition of The Children's Newspaper, the first weekly newspaper of its kind, was published. Tyerman wrote much of the material for the publication and, upon the death of Arthur Mee in 1943, he became its editor. He remained editor until his retirement in 1952 at the age of 72.

In 1940, Arthur Mee's county series The King's England was first published and Tyerman wrote the volume on Essex, which was the first to appear. The series was incomplete when Arthur Mee died and Tyerman was responsible for completing the works on the remaining counties.

Hugo Tyerman was elected a Fellow of the Chartered Institute of Journalists in 1953. He died in Dorking, Surrey, on 7 September 1977.
