= Reg Parlett =

British comic book artist

- Reg Parlett working on Buster
- Born: Reginald Edward Parlett; 2 August 1904 London, England
- Died: 18 November 1991 (aged 87)
- Area: Cartoonist
- Spouse: Mary Carter (m. 1928)
- Children: 2

Reginald Edward Parlett (2 August 1904 – 18 November 1991) was an artist from England who had a career of drawing for comic books that lasted for 66 years.

== Early career ==
Born in London, his father Harry Parlett (1881–1971) was also a prolific artist whose work appeared in many publications, often anonymously, as well as on many picture postcards, which he signed as 'Comicus'. Reg Parlett's older brother George (1902–1981) also later became an artist. On leaving school Parlett became a clerk at Thomas Cook.

Realising that he was ill-suited to working for a travel agent, he was encouraged to draw by his father, who submitted his son's cartoons to Amalgamated Press (AP); such was his success that he left Thomas Cook and in 1923 became a permanent member of staff for AP. His work appeared in the Merry and Bright comic in 1926, and he would later go on to do comic strips for magazines such as Funny Wonder, Radio Fun, Film Fun, Knockout, Buster, Whizzer and Chips, Cor!!, Whoopee!, Jackpot and Wow!. He became one of the top artists for Amalgamated Press in the second half of the 1930s, and stayed with the company until his death in 1991.

== Wartime service and work in animation ==
Parlett served in the R.A.F. during World War II drawing maps, and in the late 1940s he became a writer and artist for J. Arthur Rank's GB Animation 'Animaland' cartoons. He contributed to the 1954 animated film Animal Farm. In the 1960s Parlett worked on his first newspaper strip, when he took over Just Jake in the Daily Mirror.

== Artist for the Billy Bunter strip ==
On the death of Frank Minnitt in 1958 he became one of the artists who took over the drawing of the Billy Bunter comic strip in Knockout. Such was his popularity that the 2 August 1984 issue of Buster celebrated his 80th birthday, and a 1989 issue of Big Comic Fortnightly celebrated his 85th.

== Marriage and children ==
Parlett married in 1928, and with his wife Mary (née Carter), whom he had first met at a dance in 1921, had two sons, Malcolm and Graham Parlett.

== Book about his art ==
A book titled The Comic Art of Reg Parlett (ISBN 0-9511214-0-5) written by Alan Clark was released on 10 November 1986.
