= Reg Eves =

British cartoonist (1892–1972)

- Born: Reginald Thompson Eves; 12 December 1892
- Died: 1972 (aged 79–80)
- Areas: Writer, Editor
- Notable works: Boys' story papers Girls' story papers Girls' Crystal; Lion

Reginald Thompson Eves (12 December 1892 – 1972) was a British editor and writer of comics and story papers for the Amalgamated Press.

He joined the company in 1908, and during the First World War was assistant editor, under editor John Nix Pentelow, of the boys' story papers The Magnet and The Gem, also writing many of the stories. He was impressed by the letters he received from female readers of The Magnet, and after the war, when AP were seeking to expand into new markets, he launched the girls' story paper School Friend in 1919, becoming its first editor. However, he primarily used the male writers he was familiar with from the boys' papers, like Charles Hamilton.

In the 1920s he took charge of a group of papers, including The Champion, The Rocket and The Triumph; in the 1930s into the 1950s he edited Girls' Crystal. In 1954 he was the editor of Lion, a new weekly comic launched to compete with Hulton Press' Eagle. Despite having no interest in science fiction, he was under orders from management to have a space hero to compete with Dan Dare, and commissioned Captain Condor from writer Frank S. Pepper.

Eves retired in 1959, when AP was acquired by the Mirror Group and renamed Fleetway Publications. He died in 1972.
