= Tyerman =

Tyerman is a surname. Notable people with the surname include:

- Christopher Tyerman (born 1953), English historian of the Crusades
- Daniel Tyerman (1773–1828), English missionary
- Donald Tyerman (1908–1981), English journalist and editor
- Hugo Tyerman (1880–1977), British journalist and writer
