= Everybody's =

Everybody's may refer to:

- Everybody's (Australian magazine), an Australian tabloid-style magazine of the 1960s
- Everybody's Magazine, an American magazine published from 1899 to 1929
- Everybody's Weekly, a British weekly tabloid also called Everybody's
