= George William Wakefield =

English comics artist and illustrator (1887–1942)

George William Wakefield (13 November 1887, Hoxton – 12 May 1942, Norwich Hospital) was an English comics artist and illustrator. He is best remembered for his Laurel and Hardy comics published by Amalgamated Press's Film Fun from 1930 to his death.

== Bibliography ==
- Gifford, Denis (1976). "Wakefield, George William". In Horn, Maurice (ed.). The World Encyclopedia of Comics. New York: Chelsea House. pp. 689–690. ISBN 0877540306.
- George William Wakefield on Lambiek.
