= John Jukes =

John Jukes may refer to:

- John Jukes (bishop)
- John Jukes (cartoonist)
