= Frank Hinkins =

English author, photographer and illustrator

Francis Robert Hinkins (14 October 1852 – 6 August 1934) was an English author, photographer and illustrator. Among his works were Romany Life (1915 Mills & Boon, under nom de plume 'Frank Cuttriss') and Water-colour drawings of British spiders and their webs; he is best known for contributing many of the photographs in his friend Arthur Mee's famous book The Children's Encyclopædia.
