= The Schoolgirl =

British weekly story paper

- Illustrator: T. E. Laidler
- Staff writers: John Wheway
- Frequency: Weekly
- Publisher: Amalgamated Press
- First issue: (1st series) 21 February 1922 (2nd series) 3 August 1929
- Final issue: (1st series) 13 March 1923 (2nd series) 18 May 1940
- Country: United Kingdom
- Language: English

The Schoolgirl was a British weekly story paper aimed at girls. Published by Amalgamated Press (AP), The Schoolgirl ran in two series, the first from 1922 to 1923, and the second (essentially continuing a sister publication) from 1929 to 1940.

Most stories in The Schoolgirl centred on the girls and staff of Cliff House School, a fictional establishment in Kent, on a clifftop overlooking the sea. Cliff House was the sister school of Greyfriars, where Billy Bunter was educated, and had its own equivalent, his sister Bessie Bunter.

The Cliff House School was introduced in the Amalgamated Press boys' story paper The Magnet in 1909. Bessie Bunter and Cliff House School stories had been a regular feature of the first girls' story paper, The School Friend, beginning in 1919 and continuing through 1929.

== Publication history ==
The first series of The Schoolgirl was launched on 21 February 1922, and the publication was 28 pages long. It was subsequently reduced to 24 pages. The first series ended on 13 March 1923.

The Schoolgirl was revived on 3 August 1929, picking up where The School Friend had left off. (The School Friend was canceled with the 27 July 1929 issue, with The Schoolgirl launching exactly one week later.) In May 1936, the fellow AP girls' story paper Schoolgirls' Own (launched in 1921) was merged into The Schoolgirl.

The Schoolgirl continued until 18 May 1940, when paper rationing during the Second World War resulted in its merger with the sister story paper Girls' Crystal.

== Content ==
The Friardale Website described The Schoolgirl thusly:

The Schoolgirl . . . succeeded The School Friend, which from 1919 had been a vehicle for stories of Cliff House School for girls . . . , and The Schoolgirl initially contained Cliff House tales too. However, in 1930 Cliff House was dropped for two years in favour of other potboilers, until taken up again by John Wheway, who really turned the saga into his own. Over the next eight years he wrote the majority of the tales . . . , complemented by the precise and elegant drawings by T. E. Laidler on the covers and interiors, and arguably creating the Golden Age of Cliff House. In the main he kept the roster of characters initially assembled by [Charles] Hamilton and continued by Kirkham, Phillips, L. E. Ransome, and others but slightly altered their personalities, their relationships, and attributes — for instance, Bessie Bunter had been fat but was now more usually plump, had been grotesquely drawn by G. Dodshon but was now an elegantly delineated duffer by Laidler. Barbara Redfern was a bit of a prig in the '20's but under Wheway's hand became more like a female Harry Wharton, i.e. with all faults and thus more interesting, while her best friend Mabs Lynn solidified into the role of Frank Nugent. Jemima Carstairs continued to act like Mauly [Lord Mauleverer] whilst Augusta Anstruther-Browne tended to be a feminine Bounder [Herbert Tudor Vernon-Smith]. Marjorie Hazeldene continued as, well, Marjorie (without either Wharton or [Bob] Cherry on her mind), but Clara Trevlyn lost some of her harshness and if the vivacious tomboy was played down a little she was never anything less than lively.
