= The Story-Teller =

Early 20th century British fiction magazine

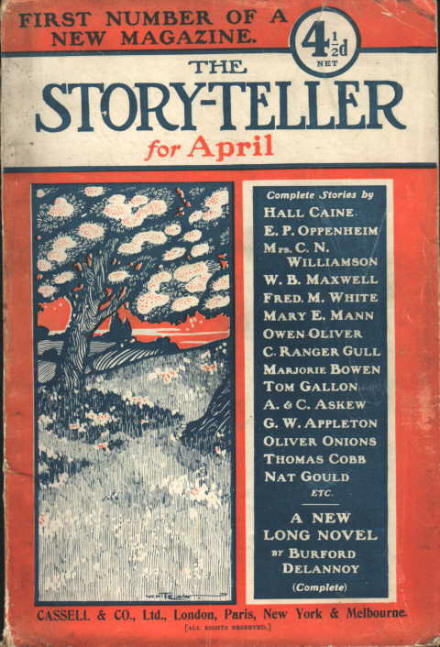
The Story-Teller April 1907, issue 1

The Story-Teller was a monthly British pulp fiction magazine from 1907 to 1937. The Story-Teller is notable for having published some of the works of prominent authors, including G. K. Chesterton, William Hope Hodgson, Rudyard Kipling, Katherine Mansfield, Sax Rohmer, Edgar Wallace, H. G. Wells, Oliver Onions, Bernard Capes, Hall Caine, Marjorie Bowen, E. Phillips Oppenheim, Alice and Claude Askew, and Tom Gallon.

== Publishing history ==
Initially published by Cassell & Co, The Story-Teller was edited by Newman Flower from its debut in April 1907 until 1928, when Clarence Winchester became the editor. In May 1927, the magazine changed his name in Storyteller when it began to be published by Amalgamated Press and, later on, merged with Cassell's Magazine in 1932.

The magazine's last issue was in November 1937. In all, 367 issues were published during its 30-year life.
