= The Harmsworth Self-Educator =

British educational magazine series

- Editor: Arthur Mee
- Frequency: Fortnightly
- Publisher: Alfred Harmsworth
- Country: United Kingdom
- Based in: London

The Harmsworth Self-Educator was a British fortnightly educational magazine series "published in forty eight issues between 1905 and 1907". It was produced at the instigation of newspaper owner Alfred Harmsworth and edited by Arthur Mee. The purpose of The Self-Educator was to provide access to education for anyone who wanted to learn applied knowledge and choose a profession. An updated revised version was published in 1913.

== Content and readers ==
The Self-Educator had sections on trades, industry, science, practical skills and careers. Science sections, included biology, physics, electricity, psychology, evolution and natural history. The publication avoided discussions of a religious nature but included religious artwork as examples of symbolism in art.

A notable alumnus was Basil Brown, the self-taught astronomer and early excavator of Sutton Hoo, and another was the Australian businessman and philanthropist, Edward Hallstrom.

== See also ==
- Alfred Harmsworth
- Arthur Mee
- Basil Brown
