= Comic Cuts =

British comic magazine

Publication information
- Publisher: Harmsworth Brothers (1890 - 1901); Amalgamated Press (1901 - 1953)
- Schedule: Weekly
- Format: Comics anthology
- Genre: Children's, humour
- Publication date: May 17, 1890; 136 years ago – September 12, 1953
- No. of issues: c. 3006
- Editor(s): Houghton Townley; G. H. Cantle; Dick Chance

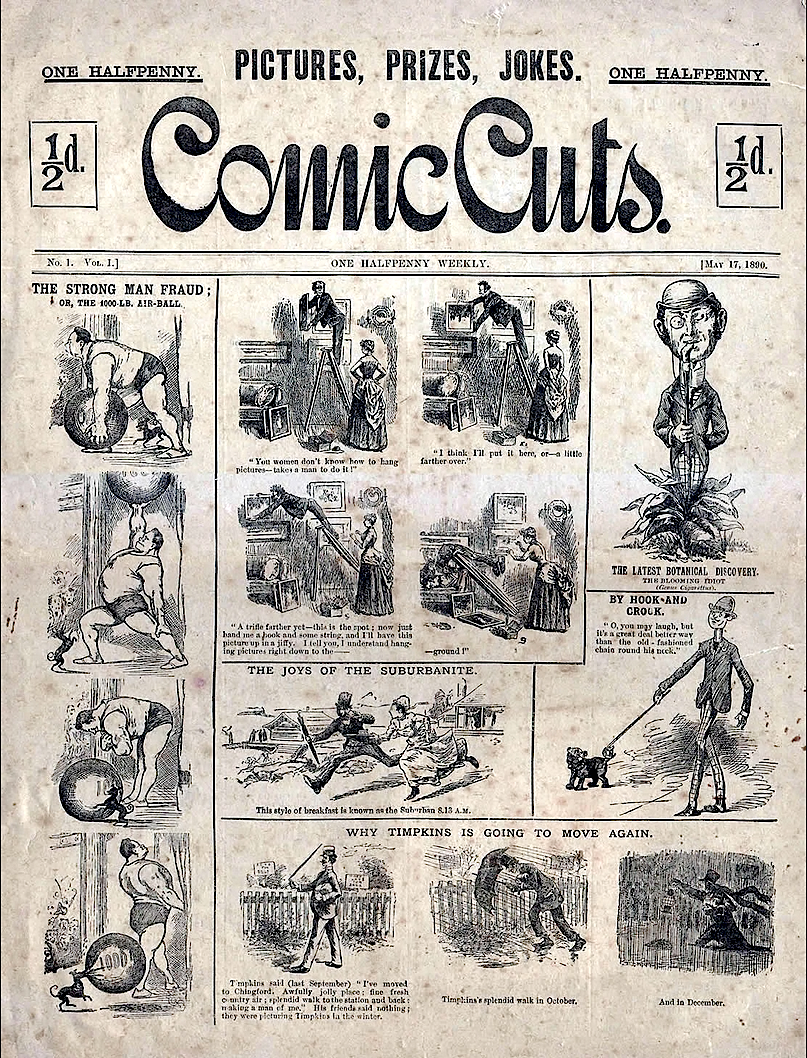

Comic Cuts was a British comic magazine. It was published from 1890 to 1953, and was created by Alfred Harmsworth. In its early days, it inspired other publishers to produce rival comic magazines. Comic Cuts held the record for the most issues of a British weekly comic for 46 years, until The Dandy overtook it in 1999.

== Creation ==
Brothers Alfred and Harold Harmsworth first came to prominence with 1888's Answers, a cut-and-paste Tit-Bits rip-off of letter responses, witticisms and tips often swiped from American magazines. Alfred's gifted promotional ideas pushed the circulation up and the brothers felt a similar approach would work with cartoons. The new title was hoped to boost Answers' circulation of 180,000 by using a comic as a cut-price appetiser to attract readers to the more expensive magazine. Alfred's belief was that thousands more were willing to gamble on a new title at such a low price, and the cheap production costs provided a way to advertise the more expensive Answers to readers. The halfpenny price saw Comic Cuts printed entirely on low-grade white newsprint, using only black ink.

== Publishing history ==
=== 1890 to 1899 ===
Comic Cuts thus initially has a very literal title ("cuts" being an industry term for line blocks and a reference to its compiled nature) as the first few editions were simply compilations of gag cartoons often consisting of just a single frame and jokes from the likes of Life and Harper's gathered together. The first issue was dated 17 May 1890 (published on the preceding Monday (Note: British publications generally carried their off-sale date, both to appear as 'new' as possible throughout their shelf life and to aid newsagents with removing unsold stock)), and was reputedly pulled together by editor Houghton Townley in four days. The 8-page first issue impressively sold 118,864 of its 120,000 print run, and circulation soon reached 300,000, some 120,000 more than Answers. An early editorial in the eleventh issue claimed prime minister William Gladstone was among the readership; something to be taken with a considerable pinch of salt given the claims that often made in Harmsworth titles. The sales were despite protests from newsagents, some of whom disliked the small profit margin the halfpenny price gave them. At this stage the comic was aimed firmly at adults, particularly the growing number of literate working class who couldn't afford a penny newspaper. Small sections were included for children, but the overall tone was aimed at the growing number of newly-literate adults.

The title's instant success saw Harmsworth's rivals scramble to produce their own comics, with Henderson producing Scraps and Snap-Shots. However, Alfred Harmsworth had anticipated this and initiated another commercial masterstrokes, establishing an ethos that would last in the British comics for nearly a century. Reasoning that competition was inevitable, he initiated a sister title as a rival so the Harmsworths would profit further from the newly discovered public appetite for comics while crowding out rivals. The result was Illustrated Chips, which - after an abortive run as a text heavy tabloid revealed the public simply wanted more of the same as Cuts - went on to be a huge success in its own right. The pair soon reached combined sales of half a million a week. Harmsworth identified this self-competition as part of his 'Schemo Magnifico', a secretive guide to publishing success he had written himself.

Within a few issues, demand for contents saw Comic Cuts carry an announcement requesting that "clever artists" submit their work for inclusion. While a sign of the title's rapid growth in popularity and profitability, there have also been suggestions that the reused American material clashed with the reprint rights of rival publisher James Henderson & Sons. As it was the stagnant economy meant Victorian London was full of struggling writers and artists, and the gradual switch to original material only ate into a small portion of Comic Cuts' profit margin. Early respondents included Roland Hill (who contributed the first in-house strip to the fourth issue, a cartoon titled "Those Cheap Excursions"), Oliver Veal and the 20-year old Tom Browne. The latter initially signed his work under the pseudonym 'Vandyke Browne', and his salary was initially a shilling a week.

On 14 February 1891 Comic Cuts had carried its first full-page cartoon strip, and in the same edition the text story "The Legend of Ivy Towers" by James Woods, became the title's first serial feature. Browne early meanwhile contributed "Popular Songs Illustrated", beginning on 5 August 1891, and within a year nearly all of the comic was original material - albeit that some material was more original than others; British-drawn rip-offs of American material was a common occurrence, particularly for one-frame cartoons. Private correspondence between Alfred and his brother Harold revealed that by the end of 1892 the comic had a circulation of 430,000 and another two years later saw it steady at 425,000 despite a growing amount of competition. Figures given to the Advertiser's Protection Society (Note: A regulator set up in 1900 to certify circulations so advertisers would know the reach they were paying for; now known as the Incorporated Society of British Advertisers) suggested it reached half a million in the 1900s. As the issues were frequently passed between friends, colleagues and family members, and the comic's fictional editor Clarence C. Cutts would proclaim the title had a million readers. The early Comic Cuts was no stranger to boastful editorials, with the title proclaiming itself the original comic (despite being nothing of the sort); however, a wry claim to be "the poor man's Punch" drew legal notices from the esteemed satirical magazine's publisher. Nevertheless, the comic regularly took sideswipes at failed imitators. In addition to Cutts, the title also had a feature reputedly written by office boy Sebastian Ginger, which was crammed with spelling 'errors'.

From 3 March 1894 Comic Cuts began a series of proto-pinups under the heading "Our Sweethearts", featuring realistically drawn beautiful women - albeit in line with Victorian wiles by being fashionably but very fully dressed. It was succeeded by a similar series called "Dancing Girls of All Nations", featuring exotic beauties in national costume. While chaste and artistic, the images were clearly intended more for titillation than education. Less salaciously, the 20 June 1896 edition depicted a smiling Queen Victoria reading Comic Cuts as part of a series of famous personalities doing so, titled "Famous Comics Posters"; under the grandmother of Europe the text read 'What would the nation do without the Queen? Worse - what would the Queen do without COMIC CUTS?'. Comic Cuts also instigated a regular tradition of the double-size "Christmas number", typically featuring snow on the masthead, holiday-related content and seasonal greetings from the editor.

Meanwhile, the features in Comic Cuts and its ilk were becoming more sophisticated as the medium grew, moving away from single panel cartoons and towards more ambitious sequential strips - referred to in contemporary industrial vernacular as 'sets' - and recurring characters. One example of this was Chubblock Homes, drawn by Jack B. Yeats. Initially debuting as a three-frame set in Comic Cuts #184 (18 November 1893), the Sherlock Holmes pastiche soon grew to an early ongoing serial. The following year the popular character was transferred to give a boost to the Harmsworths' latest venture, The Funny Wonder. Less forward-looking was 1894's "Comic Cuts Colony", a single-frame work by Frank Wilkinson; Britain was casually racist for all of the 19th and much of the 20th century, and Comic Cuts was to dip into such crass picaninny tropes for cheap laughs on several occasions.

In 1895 Tom Browne's "Squashington Flats" joined as a regular feature. Following the antics of the denizens of said neighbourhood, the latter was an immediate hit with readers, and by now Browne was being well paid for his many contributions to Harmsworth titles. On 12 September 1896, the comic published a 12-page 'Special Art Number of the World Famed Halfpenny Comic Paper', which broke new ground in the industry by featuring full colour on the front, back and centre; blue ink on a further two and another two featuring green - in return for this one-off, the price of Comic Cuts #331 was doubled to a full penny. However, the printing process was fraught and the issue was beset by production problems; a more refined process was tried again for the same year's Christmas number on 5 December, with more success.

The following year Frank Holland's amoral burglar character Chokee Bill arrived after stints on Illustrated Chips and The Comic Home Journal, claiming the front page of Cuts from 27 February 1897 until 1900. Browne meanwhile channelled his love of Cervantes' Don Quixote into the humorous "Don Quixote de Tintogs" in 1898, and devised "Robinson Crusoe Esq." the following year. While both his punishing (self-imposed) schedule and growing profile saw Browne largely work elsewhere before his early death in 1910, his style would be the gold standard for the British comic industry until well into the thirties.

=== 1900 to 1919 ===
In 1901 the Harmsworths set up Amalgamated Press to consolidate their myriad publishing interests. However comics were going out of fashion as an adult past-time, with Cuts and its contemporaries adjusting to aim squarely at children at the start of the century. This led to many contributors, not wanting to be associated with juvenile fiction, to stop signing their work, or using pen names. Harmsworth's comics would shed much of their adult readership when the company extended their halfpenny model to newspapers with the launch of The Daily Mail. However, the successful reconfiguring of Puck as a comic aimed at children showed a huge audience that didn't clash with that of newspapers. Comic Cuts and the rest followed suit, something which has been decried by some purists of Victorian comics but which possibly played a major role in the medium surviving in Britain beyond nursery titles. In this form, Comic Cuts soon settled on four alternating pages of comic strips (typically on the front and back pages, and the two-page centre spread) and four of text features, the majority ongoing features week to week. New arrivals in this period included "The Mackabeentosh Family" (1902), "Lucky Lucas and Happy Harry" (1904, drawn by Tom Wilkinson) and "Fun Aboard the Mary Ann" (started in 1907, with Arthur White as artist). Percy Cocking made the first of many contributions with "Mulberry Flats" in 1906, a similar conceit to "Squashington Flats". In 1908, "Our Merry Mannikins" (artist Percy Maycock) began, running for seven years. The comic was now firmly entrenched in British popular culture - it was mentioned in G. K. Chesterton's books Heretic (1905) and Alarms and Discursions (1910), and in a line of Cyril Tawney's song "Chicken on a Raft" — "He's looking at me Comic Cuts again".

Despite the move towards younger readers, Cuts and Chips remained successful and a new crop of artists arrived, many of them heavily influenced by Browne. In 1907 G. M. Payne, set to be an AP regular over the next 30 years, debuted the popular "Gertie the Regimental Pet", and Julius Stafford-Baker introduced "Sammy Salt the Submariner"; Baker would also draw a revival of Comic Cuts Colony in 1910; neither concept nor content were any improvement, however. Yeats meanwhile devised "The Whodidit" in 1909, the same year the comic published its thousandth edition. The next year saw Cocking debut hapless on-licence criminal "Tom the Ticket-of-Leave Man", who swiftly became a reader favourite and was firmly ensconced on the front cover. Another long-running strip to debut was Alex Akerbladh's "Waddles the Waiter" in 1912; the same year saw Bertie Brown devise "Pansy Pancake" and Joe Hardman] introduce "Chuckles the Clown".

World War I broke out in 1914, and the comic took on a topical tone with cartoons often making fun of the Central Powers, though serious war-themed material was confined to text stories. Wartime runs on paper also saw the price double then triple to 1½ pence. In 1917 Tom the Ticket-of-Leave Man escaped the attentions of PC Fairyfoot to become "Jolly Tom the Merry Menagerie Man". However, his respite was short lived as the following year Cocking introduced Jackie and Sammy, the Terrible Twins - heavily influenced by American newspaper strip "The Katzenjammer Kids" - as his mischievous nephews.

=== 1920 to 1939 ===
The twenties saw Comic Cuts enter its fourth decade still as something of a leading light for British comics. Both AP and its rivals made periodic attempts to create a lavish replacement but these tended to fade rapidly while Cuts and Chips' cheap, cheerful consistency proved enduring. Features continued to be periodically replaced and refreshed; for example, "Fun on Board the Mary Anne" was superseded by "Captain Cod's Voyage of Discovery" as a source of nautical japes in 1921, while Waddles hung up his serving plates in 1925.

A student of near-namesake Tom Browne, Bertie Brown began to draw "Click, Our Sporting Camera Man" in 1922 but would make a longer lasting impression drawing wheeze-friendly brothers "Big Ben and Little Len", who debuted in the 16 April 1927 edition. Other prolific artists of the period included Charlie Pease ("Felix the Fat", "Wee Willie Winkie" and the wince-inducing "Darkie Mo the Jolly Juju", all in 1926; "Julius and Sneezer" from 1928: "Mannikin Mansions" in 1933; "Tinker and Tich" in 1936; and "Captain Clipper", "Curly Pimple" and "Lulu and Togo" in 1938), Harry Banger ("Enoch Hard" from 1926, then proving it wasn't just black people who were mocked in "Yesma the Sheik" and "Cheekichap the Jap" in 1927, and "Stanley the Stationmaster" in 1930), and Louis Briault ("The Rollicking Little Rascals of Raspberry Road" in 1926, "Flora Flannel" in 1929, "Shrimp and Spot" in 1930 and "Merry Mascots" in 1937).

Another disruptive duo had joined Comic Cuts in 1926 in the form of Boys' Brigade terrors "Plum and Duff", initially drawn by Pease. In 1928 the comic incorporated The Golden Penny, a title recently acquired by AP's takeover of upstart rival Fleetway Press. By 1930 the pair were popular enough to be promoted to the front page, where Roy Wilson took over. While by this point Film Fun had taken Cuts' mantle of AP's best seller, it remained a key title for the company in the thirties. It was even referred to in Lennox Robinson's play Drama at Inish. On 5 May 1934 the title made its first production change for some time when it was switched to yellow paper stock for a period, then on blue from November 1935. The 16 April 1938 edition was another celebration as Comic Cuts' 2500th issue. Waddles meanwhile returned for another sizeable run, and on 15 October 1938 "Castaways of Crusoe Island" introduced the popular duo Sammy and Shrimpy.

=== 1939 to 1945 ===
However at the end of the decade two events would effectively send both Cuts and Chips on a terminal decline. The first was Scottish company DC Thomson launching The Dandy and then The Beano, which quickly secured a huge share of the weekly comic market; AP's responses - Radio Fun and The Knock-Out - further pushed the older comics down the order. The other was World War II. Compared to the previous conflict, this featured a drastic increase in aerial and submarine warfare, and even before the unexpected fall of France made more of an impression on the British home front. While comics were seen as important to morale enough to continue, paper was strictly rationed with publishers receiving an allocation. As such numerous titles with moderate but healthy circulations were cancelled to free up paper allocation, with AP dropping most of their story papers. The comics weren't spared either, though Cuts performed well enough to survive itself. From 4 November 1939 it incorporated The Jolly Comic; the merger saw Comic Cuts gain a third colour, with red (later changed to orange) overlays in the front and back pages, and a strip based on comedian Will Hay. For the 5 May 1940 edition it absorbed Larks, but from 1941 Comic Cuts was downgraded to fortnightly publication, also moving down to 9½" x 12½" pages.

However, inside the comic the war made only a moderate impression. "P.C. Penny", who had been introduced in 1938 and drawn by Cyril Price, switched his helmet from custodian to tin and enforced blackout regulations. Price had also began working on amiable charlady "Big-Hearted Martha" only a few months before war was declared and in the 14 October 1939 edition signed up to do her bit as an air warden. Plum and Duff meanwhile took a patriotic break from terrorising Colonel Bogey and Sergeant Suet to beat up 'A. Hitler' and 'B. Mussolini'. However, again any actual warfare was reduced to the occasional text story (usually more focused on spies or fifth columnists), and there was no chance of anything like actual air raids making it into the comic.

The decreased pages and wartime service for many staff meant there were few notable new arrivals during the conflict, though Price's silent cartoon "Dizzy" would last the rest of the run, while Bertie Brown's "Pinhead and Pete", a slapstick tale of two room-mates competing for a lady named Pamela, debuted in #2623 (24 August 1940) and is mainly notable for Pete being black. The character still had the same offensive physiology of his comic forebears and naturally spoke only broken pidgin English but he was no more buffoonish than Pinhead - and the surprisingly progressive notion he could even try to win the hand of a white woman suggests that those involved were probably genuinely trying to make a likable black character.

The end of the war provided little salve for Comic Cuts; paper rationing remained as Britain attempted to rebuild and the comic stayed fortnightly. The Beano and The Dandy meanwhile moved back to weekly as soon as possible, and soon returned to their pre-war circulation. With only Film Fun getting anywhere near the same figures, Amalgamated Press made an unofficial decision to simply stop trying to compete for the humour market and merely keep such titles ticking over.

=== 1950 to 1953 ===
1951 saw "Pinhead and Pete" and "Sammy and Shrimp" both end as the title underwent a revamp that saw more adventure material added, and on 22 November 1952 the title finally returned to a weekly schedule. This saw "Wizzo Ranch" take over the front cover, though it had nowhere near the staying power of Sammy and Shrimp, and was swiftly replaced by "Super Sam - Muscle Man!" (which was taken over by a young Ken Reid, who also created "Foxy" and "Billy Boffin" for Cuts), which in turn would make way for a strip based on entertainer Albert Modley. Bertie Brown contributed "Roly Stone and Bobalong", while elsewhere there was a tilt towards adventure material after the success of Eagle with Ron Embleton among the artists contributing 'straight' art. Stage cowboy Cal McCord also featured in a dramatic strip on the back page.

The relaunch was only a qualified success. The story goes that by this stage, sentiment was the key ingredient in both Comic Cuts and Chips continuing to survive. Researcher W. O. G. Lofts related that whenever the Amalgamated Press directors met to discuss cancelling underperforming titles, when Comic Cuts or Illustrated Chips was mentioned some of the directors would protest, having started out as junior on the comics, and the idea would be shelved. As the older directors thinned out, the protests diminished until finally the poor-selling title was axed.

The 12 September 1953 editions of Comic Cuts, Chips and Wonder were the last of each as AP moved to modernise their titles, the trio being replaced by T. V. Fun - the end of the three venerable titles drew national press coverage in The News of the World and News Chronicle, among others. Comic Cuts was nominally merged with Knockout, but none of the features were carried over, leaving just the name in small print on the masthead for six months. The final issue was numbered 3006, a record that would stand until it was overtaken by The Dandy in 1999. The comic would remain something of a nostalgic touchstone for much of the 20th century, even being referenced in the lyrics of Clive Dunn's saccharine novelty song "Grandad" in 1971.
