= Freddie Adkins =

British comics artist

Frederick Thomas (Freddie) Adkins (1894–1986) was a British comics artist who worked for the Amalgamated Press from the 1920s to the 1950s.

Born in Knightsbridge, London, on 7 December 1894, he joined The Daily Mail as an office boy after leaving school, his father being an old acquaintance of its proprietor, Lord Northcliffe. In 1908 he transferred to the Amalgamated Press's comics division, where as a self-taught artist, he started off drawing gag cartoons and ghosting for other artists, including the prolific Bertie Brown, on titles like Butterfly. His first strip in his own right was Nougat the Nig in Funny Wonder in 1920. Other strips he drew in the 1920s included Spick and Span in Comic Life, Sammy Sample in Lot-o'-Fun, Reggie Rambler in Jolly Jester, Professor Botany in Sunbeam and Danny and Domino in Funny Wonder. In the 1930s, he drew Bobby Blue, Timothy Topknot and Bimbo the Clown in Tiger Tim's Weekly, and Flips in Playbox. He drew Mississippi Max for Wonder in 1942, and was still illustrating for the AP's comics as late as 1956, when he drew Our Dolliwogs in Tiny Tots. He also contributed as a scriptwriter and letterer. He retired in 1959, and died in 1986.
