= Everybody's Weekly =

- Staff writers: Edgar Wallace, H. E. Bates
- Categories: Culture, Commentary
- Frequency: Weekly
- Format: Tabloid
- First issue: 1913; 112 years ago
- Final issue: April 25, 1959; 65 years ago; merged into John Bull magazine
- Company: Everybody’s Publications Ltd. (1913–1950); Amalgamated Press (1950–1959)
- Country: United Kingdom
- Based in: London
- Language: English

Everybody’s Weekly was weekly tabloid founded 1913 in London as The Competitors' Journal. The publication was widely syndicated in the United States. Everybody's, then owned and published by Everybody’s Publications Ltd., was acquired by Amalgamated Press in 1950 and then merged with John Bull magazine in 1959. The publication ran its last issue 25 April 1959.

The publication contained a short story each week, some of which were by Edgar Wallace. H. E. Bates was also a contributor.

== Chronology of the publication's names ==
- 14 Mar 1913 to 18 Apr 1925: The Competitors' Journal
- 25 Apr 1925 to 13 Aug 1927: Competitors' Journal and Everybody's Weekly
- 20 Aug 1927 to 2 Jun 1928: Everybody's Weekly and Competitors' Journal
- 9 Jun 1928 to 25 Jan 1930: Everybody's Weekly
- 1 Feb 1930 to 25 Apr 1959: Everybody's
