= My Magazine =

British children's magazine

My Magazine was a British magazine for children published from 1908 to 1933 with different names. It was published by Amalgamated Press, and had articles on science, technology, geography, and current events.

== History and profile ==
The magazine was started in 1908 under the name of The Children’s Encyclopaedia. In 1910 its name was changed several times. From 1911 to 1914 it was published under the name The Children's Magazine. Then the magazine was renamed My Magazine and was published monthly until 1933.
