= Funny Wonder =

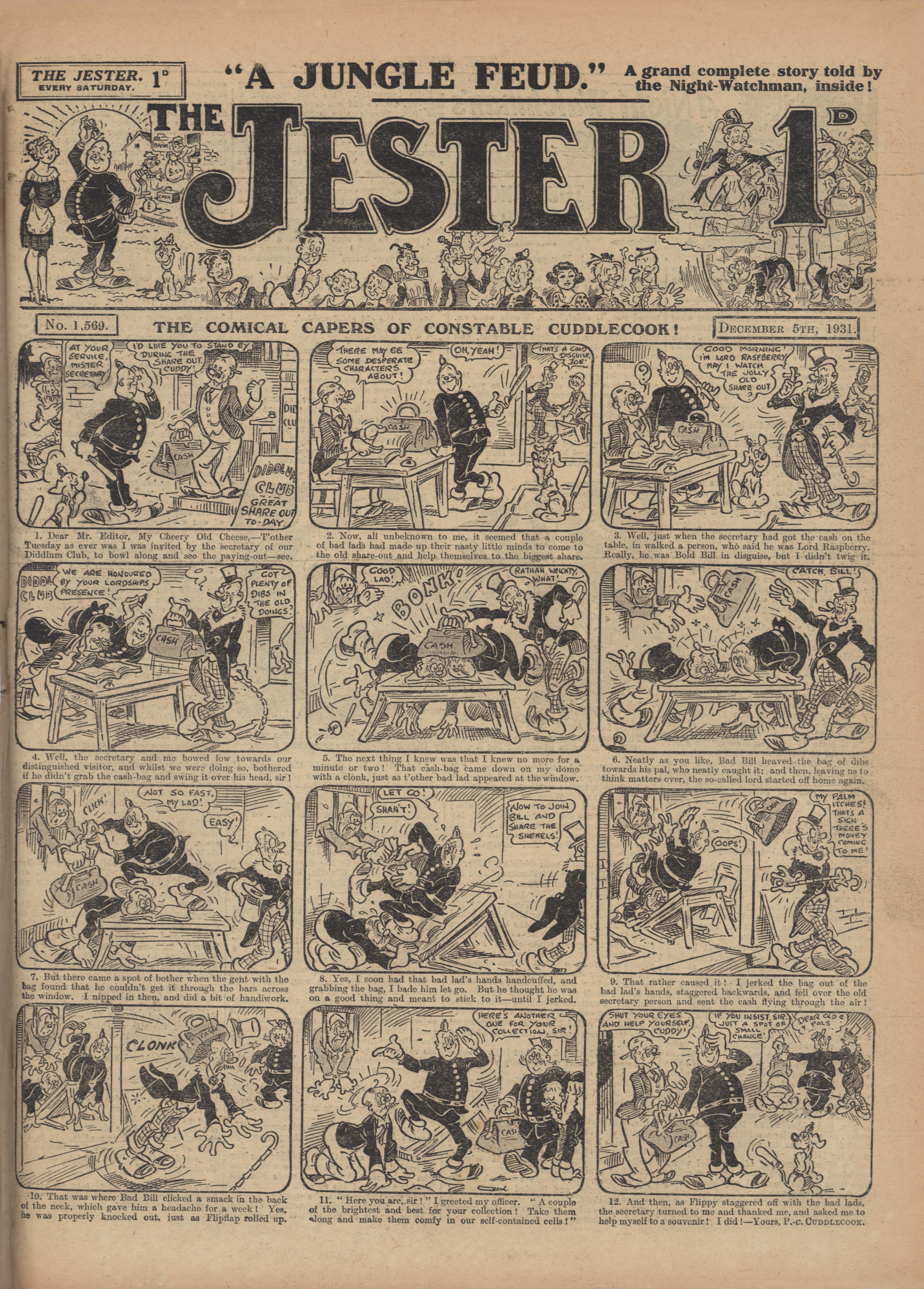
A 1931 issue of the comic, then known under the title The Jester. The cover shows a strip featuring the character 'Constable Cuddlecook'.

Funny Wonder was the name of a pre-War humorous comic published in the United Kingdom by Amalgamated Press. It was part of a long string of related titles which stretched from 1892 to 1953, known by a variety of additional titles, including Wonder, Jester, Jester and Wonder, Jolly Jester, Penny Wonder, and Halfpenny Wonder. There were two main (overlapping) runs, the first stretching from 1892 to 1940, and the second from 1912 to 1953; the first run being merged into the second. The most well-known, and longest-running single version, was Funny Wonder series 3, which ran 1,404 weekly issues from 1914 to 1942. (During this same stretch, the original run title was mostly known as Jester.) Notable creators who worked on the comic include Reg Parlett and Roy Wilson.

== Publication history ==
=== First run (1892–1940) ===
Jester Wonder / Jester and Wonder / Jolly Jester

Publication information
- Publisher: Amalgamated Press
- Schedule: Weekly
- Format: Tabloid
- Genre: Humor/comedy
- Publication date: 16 November 1901–18 May 1940: (Wonder) 1901 to 1902 (Wonder and Jester) 1902 (Jester and Wonder) 1902–1912 (Jester) 1912–1920 (Jolly Jester) 1920–1924 (Jester) 1924–1940
- No. of issues: 2,010: (Wonder) 25 (Wonder and Jester) 2 (Jester and Wonder) 506 (Jester) 465 (Jolly Jester) 165 (Jester) 847

Wonder started out as a broadsheet, publishing 27 issues in from 30 July 1892 to 27 January 1893. At that point, in January 1893, the title became Funny Wonder, restarted its numbering and becoming a weekly tabloid that published 325 issues until March 1899.

Keeping the title, The Funny Wonder restarted its numbering, publishing 109 issues from c. March 1899 to c. 21 April 1901. After a hiatus of a little more than a month, the publication changed the title back to Wonder (keeping the same numbering), publishing 24 more issues from 1 June 1901 until issue #133 on 9 November 1901.

The second iteration of the comic published a total of 2,010 consecutively-numbered issues from 1901 to 1940. Keeping the title Wonder, the publication again restarted from #1, published 25 issues from 16 November 1901 to 3 May 1902, when it became Wonder and Jester for 2 issues. Flipping its name to Jester and Wonder, the title published 506 issues from 24 May 1902 to 20 January 1912. With issue #534 (27 January 1912), the title became simply Jester, publishing 465 issues until 18 December 1920 when it became Jolly Jester with issue #999. The comic published an additional 165 issues under that name until 15 January 1924, when it changed back to Jester, publishing 847 more issues from 23 February 1924 until 18 May 1940. The first run concluded with issue #2010, at which point it merged into the title's second run (at that point called Funny Wonder).

=== Second run (1912–1953) ===
Funny Wonder Halfpenny Wonder / Wonder

Publication information
- Publisher: Amalgamated Press
- Schedule: Weekly
- Genre: Action/adventure, humor/comedy
- Publication date: 28 March 1914–12 September 1953: (Halfpenny Wonder) 1914 (Funny Wonder) 1914–1942 (Wonder) 1942–1953
- No. of issues: 1,760: (Halfpenny Wonder) 39 (Funny Wonder) 1,404 (Wonder) 317
- Main character(s): Charlie Chaplin

Creative team
- Artist(s): Freddie Adkins, Bertie Brown, George Heath, Donald Newhouse, Reg Parlett, Wally Robertson, Roy Wilson

Meanwhile, back in 1912 — just as Wonder and Jester dropped the "Wonder" name to become simply Jester — a new title, The Penny Wonder, began. The Penny Wonder published 47 issues from 10 January 1912 to 28 December 1912 before it restarted (again, at #1) as Wonder, publishing 64 issues from 4 January 1913 to 21 March 1914.

Changing title to Halfpenny Wonder and restarting the numbering one more, it published issues #1–39 from 28 March 1914 to 19 December 1914, before it changed names again. With the issue of 26 December 1914, the title once again became Funny Wonder, publishing 1,404 issues until 16 May 1942.

Funny Wonder was the first of Amalgamated Press' comics to have its own annuals, which ran from the edition dated 1935 until the one dated 1941, when it was ended due to the effects of World War II.

In May 1940, Funny Wonder absorbed Jester (which had previously been included as a pull-out section in overseas editions). With the issue of 30 May 1942, Funny Wonder changed titles again, back to Wonder, publishing 317 issues from May 1942 to 12 September 1953, when it merged with Radio Fun.

== Content ==
=== First run ===
Like other early comics, The Funny Wonder/Wonder was satirical in nature.

==== Strips ====
- Freddy Pieface and Slim Jim (1890s)
- The Comical Capers of Constable Cuddlecook (1930s)
- Basil and Bert, Our Very Private Detectives (1930s)

=== Second run ===
This version of the comic aimed much more at children. As with other similar publications of the era, it was roughly 50% comics and 50% text features. In 1926 Funny Wonder began to feature Charlie Chaplin on the cover.

==== Strips ====
- Bertie Blobbs originally by Donald Newhouse
- Bob Harriday — Western strip
- Charlie Chaplin (1915–1944) by Bertie Brown
- Danny and Domino by Freddie Adkins
- Frolics and Fun with Mustava Bunn by Reg Parlett
- George the Jolly Gee-Gee — continued in Radio Fun
- Grandad Jones — The Youth with Old Bones
- The Marmaduke and His Ma by Wally Robertson
- Milly — The Merry Maid of All Work by Reg Parlett
- Nougat the Nig (1920s) by Freddie Adkins
- Pitch and Toss, Our Saucy Shipwrecked Mariners, originally by Joe Hardman; later by Donald Newhouse and then Roy Wilson and Reg Parlett
- Pranks in the Park
- Private Muggins by Roy Wilson (post-1945)
- Roy Rogers
- The Sacred Eye of Satpura by George Heath — adventure strip
- Sheriff Shucks of Shotgun City
- Sweet Rosie O'Grady

== Sources ==
1892–1899

- Wonder (1892–1893) at the Grand Comics Database
- The Funny Wonder (1893–1899) at the Grand Comics Database

1899–1901 series

- The Funny Wonder (1899–1901) at the Grand Comics Database
- Wonder (1901) at the Grand Comics Database

1901–1940 series

- Wonder (1901–1902) at the Grand Comics Database
- Wonder and Jester (1902) at the Grand Comics Database
- Jester and Wonder (1902–1912) at the Grand Comics Database
- Jester (1912–1920) at the Grand Comics Database
- Jolly Jester (1920–1924) at the Grand Comics Database
- Jester (1924–1940) at the Grand Comics Database

1912–1914

- Penny Wonder (1912) at the Grand Comics Database
- Wonder (1913–1914) at the Grand Comics Database

1914–1953 series

- Halfpenny Wonder (1914) at the Grand Comics Database
- The Funny Wonder (1914–1942) at the Grand Comics Database
- Wonder (1942–1953) at the Grand Comics Database
