= Susan Hinkins =

American statistician

Susan M. Hinkins is a retired American government and survey statistician who has worked for the Internal Revenue Service, the United States Environmental Protection Agency, Ernst & Young, NORC at the University of Chicago, and multiple human rights organizations.

== Education and career ==
Hinkins majored in mathematics at the University of Wisconsin–Madison, graduating in 1971. She went to Montana State University, where she earned a master's degree in mathematics in 1973, and completed a Ph.D. in statistics in 1979. Her doctoral dissertation, Using Incomplete Multivariate Data to Simultaneously Estimate the Means, was supervised by Martin Alva Hamilton.

She began her government service in 1980–1981, working for the Office of Radiation Programs of the United States Environmental Protection Agency, on the measurement of radon in homes. Next, she worked for the Internal Revenue Service from 1981 to 1998, on income statistics. After three years at Ernst & Young, working on quality of service in telecommunications, she joined NORC as a senior statistician in 2001. At NORC, she managed accounting data for Native American funds held by the US government, and testified as an expert in the Cobell v. Salazar lawsuit concerning alleged mismanagement of those funds. Her other work at NORC concerned household survey data, anonymization of medicare data, and the assessment of capabilities for rapid response to bioterrorism. While continuing at NORC as a senior statistician, she also chaired the committee on scientific freedom and human rights of the American Statistical Association (ASA), served as advisor to the scientific advisory committee of the Human Rights Data Analysis Group from 2013 to 2021, represented the ASA on the Science and Human Rights Coalition of the American Association for the Advancement of Science (AAAS), and co-chaired the AAAS Service to the Human Rights Community working group.

== Personal life ==
Hinkins is the daughter of Russell Hinkins (1901–1988), a high school teacher and principal, farmer, and grain storage official in southwestern Wisconsin. She has worked as a dance instructor for Scottish country dance in Bozeman, Montana.

== Recognition ==
Hinkins was elected as a Fellow of the American Statistical Association in 2004.
