= Greyfriars School =

Fictional English public school

- A map of Greyfriars School
- Kent; England

Information
- Type: Fictional: Public school Boarding school
- Religious affiliation: Church of England
- Established: 1540s
- Founder: Henry VIII
- Chairman of the Board of Governors: Sir Hilton Popper
- Headmaster: The Rev Herbert Henry Locke, D.D.
- Gender: Boys
- Age: 13 to 18
- Publication: The Greyfriars Herald
- Created by: Charles Hamilton writing as Frank Richards

Greyfriars School is a fictional English public school used as a setting in the long-running series of stories by the writer Charles Hamilton, who wrote under the pen-name of Frank Richards. Although the stories are focused on the Remove (or lower fourth form), whose most famous pupil was Billy Bunter, other characters also featured on a regular basis.

Time is frozen in the Greyfriars stories; although the reader sees the passing of the seasons, the characters' ages do not change and they remain in the same year groups.

From 1908 to 1940, the stories appeared in The Magnet, in a total of 1,683 weekly issues. After 1940, the stories continued to appear in book form until Hamilton's death in 1961. Billy Bunter of Greyfriars School was broadcast as a BBC television series from 19 February 1951 to 22 July 1961. A comic strip was published in Knockout (drawn by Frank Minnitt) from 1939 to 1958, and then drawn by various other artists until Knockout merged with Valiant, in which comic strips continued to appear from 23 February 1963 to 16 October 1976.

== Location ==
Exterior views of Greyfriars School

Greyfriars School is in the county of Kent, southeast England. The school lies on the fictional river Sark, upstream of the nearby village of Friardale and downstream of the market town of Courtfield. It is near the coast: the fishing village of Pegg is described as being within a mile (1.6 km). There are two other public schools nearby, Cliff House girls school and Highcliffe. Farther away are the towns of Lantham and Wapshott.

== Organisation ==
The school consists of seven forms, loosely based on age groups. These are: First Form (Year 7), Second Form (Year 8), Third Form (Year 9), Lower Fourth / "The Remove" (Year 10), Upper Fourth (Year 11A), "The Shell" (Year 11B), Fifth Form (Year 12) and Sixth Form (Year 13). Each form has its own Form Master, who takes the majority of the lessons. Specialist masters are used for French, sports and mathematics.

The Headmaster appoints a Head Prefect, who is responsible for leading the other Prefects and supporting the Headmaster in matters of school discipline. There is also a School Captain, who is head of school games. The School Captain is elected by a democratic vote of all members of the school. In the great majority of the stories, both positions were held by George Bernard Wingate. Similarly, each Form has a Head Boy, appointed by the Form Master and a Form Captain, elected by the Form.

Unusually, both in terms of real-life public schools and their fictional counterparts, Greyfriars School does not have a house system. In the early Magnet stories, this created a problem for the author in that inter-house rivalries are a useful source of plot conflicts in many fictional school stories. To compensate for this, Frank Richards created three separate forms of similar age groups at Greyfriars (the "Remove", the Upper Fourth, and the "Shell") as well as rival characters in the neighbouring Highcliffe School. As the stories developed, the time would come when plot conflicts would arise naturally from the minutely detailed characters that were fleshed out over the years.

The school is supervised by a Board of Governors, whose members include the short-tempered local landowner, Sir Hilton Popper, as well as Colonel Wharton and Major Cherry, both relatives of prominent characters in the Greyfriars Remove (Lower Fourth) form.

Boys spend most of the day in class, or in their spare time either in a common room, on the sports fields, or in shared studies; they sleep in shared dormitories. Breakfast and lunch are taken communally. A modest high tea in hall is also provided (disparagingly known as "doorsteps and dishwater"), but most of the boys prefer to make their own arrangements in their studies, funds permitting.

== Ethos ==
While the masters naturally emphasise scholastic matters, for the pupils (and readership) it is physical activities that are at the heart of the school's ethos. Prowess at sports is the best route to popularity and respect, while over-attainment at study is something of lesser, if not negative, importance. Disputes are often settled by fights, with the invariable, if unrealistic, outcome that virtue triumphs over vice. Corporal punishment is widely used by the masters and by the Sixth Form prefects. The ultimate punishment, short of expulsion, is a birching administered by the saintly headmaster, Dr Locke. Lesser punishments are lines (copying out a hundred lines from a Latin text by the classical author Virgil), or for really serious infractions among the older forms a "book" (copying out a complete Latin text by Virgil, which might be up to 952 lines). There is also a Punishment Room ("Punny") which, in rare and particularly serious cases, may be used to keep an offender in solitary confinement for a number of days.

== Style and themes ==
Harold had no eye for scenery. He was taking a rest – his career being one of successive rests. Mr. Hinks was one of those men born with a natural disinclination to work. Under happier auspices he might have been a Cabinet Minister or an ornament of the Diplomatic Service. But, as a matter of sad fact, he was a tramp.

— The Magnet (1933)

Hamilton's writing style has been compared with that of his contemporary P G Wodehouse. A light and distinctive prose style combines with a strong comedic element and a large ensemble of strongly-drawn characters. The exceptional volume of material produced by Hamilton over his writing career allowed both characters and locations to be developed in great depth.

Observations of contemporary life and satire are found in Hamilton's work, and he frequently uses his characters as mouthpieces to make telling ironic points:

The old bounder's unemployed," said Bunter. "Fairly up against it, you know. Can't get a job. My opinion is they won't work. I've heard my pater say so. I remember, last evening of the holidays, seeing my pater sitting in his armchair, sipping his port, and saying it was all due to slacking and drink.

In particular, he had little respect for professions or pretensions, and politicians, lawyers and stockbrokers are regularly at the sharp end of his cynical prose.

Time is frozen in the Greyfriars stories; although the reader sees the passing of the seasons, the characters' ages do not change and the students remain in the same year groups.

The style of the stories evolved over the years. For the first decade, the stories tended to be complete episodes. This was also a development period in which the author established his style. During the 1920s, the format gradually changed to serials; this was also a period of character development in which many of the large cast of characters were given their own storylines in turn. Many commentators agree that the "golden age" of Greyfriars stories was in the period 1930 to 1934, when the standard of plotlines and mellow humour reached its peak; while after 1934, the high standard of plot construction continued, but plots and themes were increasingly repeated.

Hamilton's work has attracted criticism, most notably from George Orwell in a 1940 essay published in Horizon magazine. Orwell described Hamilton's style as easily imitated (to facilitate substitute writers), plagiarist, and largely comprising shallow right wing content. He also expressed incredulity that stories spanning 30 years could have been authored by the same individual. The key passage in his essay, which was to provoke a strong response from Hamilton, is reproduced below.

The year is 1910, or 1940, it is all the same. You are at Greyfriars. A rosy-cheeked boy of fourteen in posh tailor-made clothes is sitting down to tea in your study on the Remove passage, after an exciting game of football which was won by an odd goal in the last half-minute. There is a cosy fire in your study; outside the wind is whistling, the ivy clusters thickly round the old grey stone, the King is on his throne, and the pound is worth a pound. Over in Europe the comic foreigners are jabbering and gesticulating; but the grim grey battleships of the British Fleet are steaming up the Channel, and at the outposts of Empire the monocled Englishmen are holding the niggers at bay. Lord Mauleverer has just got another fiver and we are settling down to a tremendous tea of sausages, sardines, crumpets, potted meat, jam and doughnuts. After tea, we shall sit round the study fire having a good laugh at Billy Bunter and discussing the team for next week's match against Rookwood. Everything is safe, solid and unquestionable. Everything will be the same for ever and ever.

Hamilton's response to this criticism was presented in an article published in the same magazine shortly afterwards, in which he rebutted each of Orwell's points.

Other commentators have challenged the view that Hamilton's work can be narrowly categorised as right wing, drawing attention to examples of his output that demonstrate strong independent views. Over the years, Hamilton was ever ready to air unfashionable causes to his young audience, but did so in a way that did not attract controversy or jeopardise publication of his stories. Anti-capitalism, early Socialism, the Suffragette movement and conscientious objectors during World War I all received sympathetic treatment in Hamilton's work. In an age when the word "nigger" was not yet regarded in the same pejorative sense that applies today, Hamilton's work consistently emphasised the offensive nature of the term from as early as 1922; and his output even included unfashionable anti-British sentiments in stories set against the background of imperial India.

== Main recurring characters ==
Although the full ensemble of recurring characters in the Greyfriars world is in the hundreds, a smaller group of fewer than 20 recurring characters, along with guest characters, drive the majority of the stories. Each of the following characters appears in more than 800 Magnet stories (approximately half of the total of 1,683).

=== Lower Fourth Form (Remove) ===
The main characters in the stories are to be found in the Lower Fourth Form, known as the Remove.

- William George Bunter – known as Billy Bunter, is the best known character in the stories. He was initially conceived as a minor character, but developed into one of the principal characters of the stories as his comic potential was realised. His big round spectacles and rolling gait earned him the nickname the "'Owl of the Remove'". Foolish, greedy, deceitful, comically conceited, but essentially harmless. Among his few virtues are an occasional tendency to display courage for the sake of others (invariably while being terrified himself); a genuine love and concern for his mother; and, oddly enough, generosity, on the rare occasions when he is in possession of food or cash. Appears in 1,670 stories and introduced in Magnet No. 1 The Making of Harry Wharton (15 February 1908).
- The Famous Five – a quintet of friends comprising Harry Wharton (Remove Head Boy and Form Captain), his closest friend Frank Nugent , cheery and boisterous Bob Cherry , Indian Prince Hurree Jamset Ram Singh and plain-speaking Johnny Bull from Yorkshire. All strong sportsmen, they are the de facto leaders of the Greyfriars Remove. Wharton and Nugent were both introduced in Magnet No. 1 The Making of Harry Wharton (15 February 1908) and are the only two characters to appear in all 1,683 Magnet stories; while Cherry was introduced in Magnet No. 2 The Taming of Harry (22 February 1908) and appears in 1,682 Magnet stories.
- Percival Bolsover - originally introduced as an unpleasant bully, though has calmed over time. Now shares a study with French junior Napoleon Dupont, his one true friend, whom he protects from bullying. Appears in 856 stories and first introduced in Magnet No. 182 The Cock of the Walk (5 August 1911).
- Peter Hazeldene - weak and vacillating, earning him the early nickname of "Vaseline". Later known simply as "Hazel". His sister is schoolgirl Marjorie Hazeldene, whose popularity among many Greyfriars boys leads them to show more patience towards her brother than he perhaps deserves. Appears in 834 stories and first introduced in Magnet No. 2 The Taming of Harry (22 February 1908).
- Lord Mauleverer – outwardly, a languid aristocratic millionaire with a sleepy demeanour. But there are hidden depths to “Mauly” - his keen judgement of human character and simple faith in human nature have led him more than once to show loyalty to friends in adverse circumstances. On such occasions he reveals an astute mind and considerable leadership qualities, along with a talent for boxing that is a match for anyone in the form. Appears in 922 stories and first introduced in Magnet No. 184 The Schoolboy Millionaire (19 August 1911).
- Harold Skinner – one of the most unpleasant characters at Greyfriars – cowardly, malicious and with unwholesome vices such as smoking and gambling. The perpetrator of cruelly accurate cartoons and malicious practical jokes. Appears in 1,232 stories and first introduced in Magnet No. 1 The Making of Harry Wharton (15 February 1908).
- Sidney James Snoop - a weak character, very much under Skinner's unhealthy influence. Appears in 887 stories and first introduced in Magnet No. 45 A Lad from Lancashire (19 December 1908).
- Peter Hastings Todd – a tall, thin, budding lawyer who is the son of a Clerkenwell solicitor. Devotes much of his time to improving Bunter: a futile, fruitless and frustrating occupation. Appears in 1,039 stories and first introduced in Magnet No. 205 The Duffer's Double (13 January 1912).
- Herbert Tudor Vernon-Smith– a charismatic but reckless and quick-tempered character who features prominently in the stories. A natural leader, both on and off the sports field, but with a hard and selfish streak. Has too much money, thanks to the indulgence of his millionaire father, which allows him to follow a rebellious lifestyle that has earned him the nickname "The Bounder". Much improved by his friendship with Tom Redwing who was introduced in 1918. Appears in 1,279 stories and first introduced in Magnet No. 119 The Bounder of Greyfriars (21 May 1910).

=== Other Greyfriars characters ===
- The Reverend Dr. Herbert Henry Locke - venerable Headmaster of Greyfriars School. Wise, respected, but sometimes unworldly. Appears in 970 stories and first introduced in Magnet No. 1 The Making of Harry Wharton (15 February 1908).
- Horace Coker - clumsy, loud and opinionated Fifth Former. Convinced of his intellectual superiority and sporting prowess, an opinion that is strangely shared by nobody except his adoring Aunt Judy, who keeps him well supplied with cash and food hampers. Appears in 882 stories and first introduced in Magnet No. 143 The Head of Study 14 (5 November 1910).
- Henry Samuel Quelch - the Remove Form Master, and as such the most prominent Master in the Greyfriars stories. A scholarly gentleman, a confirmed bachelor, and a man of strong character respected by the boys in his Form. A strict disciplinarian and frequently described as a beast, but a just beast. A keen walker, spends much of his spare time working on his monumental work, The History of Greyfriars. Appears in 1,383 stories and first introduced in Magnet No.1 The Making of Harry Wharton (15 February 1908).
- George Wingate - popular and highly respected Greyfriars Head Prefect and School Captain. Appears in 1,112 stories and first introduced in Magnet No.1 The Making of Harry Wharton (15 February 1908).

== Storylines ==
The extraordinary volume of output of Greyfriars stories inevitably meant that plotlines and themes were repeated, though usually involving different characters and novel twists. In the early years, this often meant stories that were resolved across 1–2 issues; but by the early 1930s a series would typically take 8–12 weekly issues to play out.

=== Characters with double lives ===
An oft-repeated theme involves the arrival of a new character at the school who turns out to be not quite what he seems. Dick Lancaster joins the Greyfriars Sixth form in 1931 (Magnets Nos. 1209 to 1219) and immediately becomes one of the most popular men in the school: handsome, easy going and a fine cricketer. Unknown to his schoolfellows though, he is also the “Wizard” – a member of a criminal gang of burglars who is particularly skilled at safe-cracking.

Greyfriars turns out to be highly popular as a base for disguised burglars. The “Courtfield Cracksman” (Magnets Nos. 1138 to 1151) conceals himself by finding employment on the Greyfriars staff in 1930; as does “Jimmy the One” (Magnets Nos.1247 to 1255) in 1931, and “Slim Jim” (Magnets Nos. 1660 to 1675) in 1939. In two of these cases Herbert Vernon-Smith has his suspicions – in one case he is proved right, and ends up in danger as a result; in the other case he is disastrously wrong, suspecting the undercover detective assigned to the case and befriending the real villain.

=== Rivals for a fortune ===
A variation on the former theme was the arrival of a new boy who turns out to be the secret enemy of an established Greyfriars character. Usually this involved a rivalry over an inheritance. An early example was the “Da Costa” series of 1928 (Magnets Nos. 1059 to 1067), when new arrival Arthur Da Costa attempts to disgrace Harry Wharton in an attempt to disinherit him of a large fortune. This plotline was repeated a number of times.

Coker's younger cousin, Edgar Caffyn, one of the most unpleasant characters ever to appear in the stories, arrives at the school in 1935 (Magnets Nos. 1404 to 1412) with the intention of getting Coker expelled and replacing him as Aunt Judy's heir. It is Billy Bunter's turn in 1938, when his relation Arthur Carter, having been expelled from his previous school, has been disinherited by a wealthy uncle. He comes to Greyfriars with the intention of disgracing Bunter, his uncle's new adopted heir (Magnets Nos. 1561 to 1572). In all of these storylines, the rascally newcomer is aided and abetted by an even more rascally lawyer.

Finally, in 1939, Herbert Vernon-Smith's relative Bertie Vernon arrives at the school. Vernon is startlingly similar to Vernon-Smith in appearance, which allows a number of dramatic situations to develop before Vernon's real purpose in coming to Greyfriars is revealed.

=== Doppelgängers ===
Many storylines have involved the arrival at Greyfriars of a relative who bears a startling resemblance to an existing character. Usually, the two doppelgängers are of opposite character types, and are continuously mistaken for each other, enabling a number of plot conflicts to develop. As well as the Bertie Vernon series, mentioned above, other doppelgängers have included Billy Bunter's cousin Wally, Peter Todd's cousin Alonzo and Harry Wharton's relative Ralph Stacey (Magnets Nos. 1422 to 1433). The Stacey series, in particular, is rated by many commentators as being among the finest Greyfriars series written by Hamilton.

=== The rebellious Remove ===
The Remove included a number of naturally rebellious characters and several plotlines exploited this to the full. A typical storyline would involve an act of injustice or tyranny resulting in the juniors rising up in open rebellion against authority.

One of the first examples was the "Judge Jeffreys" series of 1917 (Magnets Nos. 501 to 505), in which a new head master, Mr Jeffreys, institutes a severe punishment regime, causing the Remove to lead a rebellion against his rule that ends in Mr Jeffreys being driven out by the whole school.

The “High Oaks Rebellion” series of 1928 (Magnets Nos. 1043 to 1049) sees Mr Quelch, the Remove Master, unjustly dismissed from the school through a malicious trick by Skinner. Led and financed by Lord Mauleverer, the Remove walk out of Greyfriars, set up their own school at High Oaks and defend it against a number of attempts to forcibly return them to Greyfriars.

The "Brander" series, from 1930 (Magnets Nos. 1169 to 1174) is a particularly notable example of this story type. Newcomer Otto van Tromp grievously injures Dr. Locke in an unscrupulous scheme to install his uncle, Mr. Brander, as the new headmaster of Greyfriars. In this, the pair enlist the assistance of the debt-laden chairman of the Greyfriars governors, Sir Hilton Popper, who owes money to Brander. Van Tromp becomes head prefect and abuses his position to such an extent that the Remove rise up in open rebellion and barricade themselves in the Remove passage. They are eventually joined by characters from other forms in the school, including fifth formers and prefects. Mr. Quelch, meanwhile, is dismissed by Brander, but invokes the school statutes that allow a dismissed master of long standing to remain at the school until his appeal is heard by the governors.

In 1934, Billy Bunter is expelled after being unjustly blamed for drenching Mr Prout in ink (Magnets Nos. 1374 to 1382). The Remove rise up in his support and build a fortified camp on Popper Island, which they successfully defend against a number of assaults by the prefects and other seniors.

Later in the same year, Headmaster Dr Locke and several senior prefects are hospitalised following a motor accident. Fifth form master Mr Prout takes over as temporary headmaster and appoints the bullying Gerald Loder as Head Prefect; as a result, a tyrannical regime develops at the school. Prompted by Vernon-Smith, the juniors form a secret society, the Secret Seven, to fight back. Although the Secret Seven has over 30 members, only 7, wearing masks, are ever seen to take part in active operations at any one time. The Magnet gave away a number of detective-themed promotional gifts over the course of the series which were featured in the narrative of the stories.

After Dr Locke is again incapacitated in 1937, the temporary headmastership passes this time to Mr Hacker, unpopular Master of the Shell, who is supported by Sixth form bully Arthur Carne. The resultant tyranny again prompts the Remove to fight back; this time, they march out of the school and barricade themselves in the tuckshop (Magnets Nos. 1510 to 1515).

=== Travel series ===
The summer holiday break, between the summer and Michaelmas terms, saw the Greyfriars juniors depart on a number of adventures away from the school. Frequently, this involved travel overseas.

The early Magnets saw some short trips to Europe, but it was not until 1922 that the first proper foreign travel series appeared. In Magnets Nos. 768 to 774 the juniors travel with Bob Cherry's cousin to Africa in search of buried ivory. The juniors revisited Africa with Mr Vernon-Smith in 1931 (Magnets Nos. 1228 to 1236).

In the India series of 1926 (Magnets Nos. 960 to 970) the juniors travel to Bhanipur with Colonel Wharton to ensure Hurree Singh's throne is kept safe against the machinations of foreign spies.

In 1927, the juniors visit the South Seas in Mr Vernon-Smith's yacht (Magnets Nos. 1017 to 1026), in search of Black Peter's treasure, which will make Redwing financially independent. The juniors revisited the Southern seas in 1938 (Magnets Nos. 1588 to 1598)

The longest foreign travel series came in 1929 (Magnets Nos. 1092 to 1107), when Mr Fish took a party of juniors and seniors all the way across the United States to Hollywood to make a school film. Though the trip was sold to the school and parents as educational, the primary purpose of the trip was to make films with real schoolboys without paying them Hollywood rates. The juniors went to the US for a second time in 1938 (Magnets Nos.1573 to 1582), this time to Texas, where they encountered another of Charles Hamilton's characters, the Rio Kid.

The Egypt series of 1932 (Magnets Nos. 1277 to 1284) follows the adventures of Billy Bunter, accompanied by Lord Mauleverer and the Famous Five, across Europe and the Mediterranean Sea to the North African deserts (a locale previously visited in the Sahara series of 1925). They are pursued by the villain Konstantine Kalizelos, who is convinced the schoolboys have a clue to the whereabouts of a fabulous lost jewel. Author Charles Hamilton never visited Egypt, and the authenticity of many of the descriptions and scenes in this series is remarkable. In particular, the characterisation of two Egyptians, the millionaire Hilmi Maroudi and the lower caste guide, Hassan the Dragoman, has won acclaim. These stories were partially reprinted in the Schoolboys Own Libraries before World War II and again by Armada in the 1970s, but both omitted the conclusion of the series.

The China Series of 1930 begins with the Remove junior, Wun Lung, menaced by the distant Chinese mandarin Tang Wang. Accompanied by Billy Bunter, the Famous Five and the detective Ferrers Locke, he returns to China via Hong Kong and Singapore. A series of adventures ensues. The author draws a vivid picture of a very different China ruled by Mandarins – a colourful land rich in history and ancient customs.

== In other fiction ==
Greyfriars, and some of its (by then) former pupils, appeared in The League of Extraordinary Gentlemen: The Black Dossier.

George Harbinger is a fictional civil servant in The Secret Servant by Gavin Lyall. He refers to the intelligence services of Warsaw Pact member states using language in the style of Charles Hamilton, such as "cads and rotters" to indicate their agents in the UK, and "Greyfriars" to indicate their various headquarters (particularly the Lubyanka Building as the activities of the satellite states' services are assumed to be directed by the KGB).

== See also ==
- The Magnet
- The Gem
- Tom Merry
