= Amalgamated Press =

British newspaper and magazine publishing company (1901–1959)

- Predecessor: Harmsworth Brothers Ltd
- Founded: 1901
- Founder: Alfred Harmsworth
- Defunct: 1959
- Successor: International Publishing Company (IPC)
- Country of origin: England
- Headquarters location: Fleetway House (from 1912)
- Key people: Harold Harmsworth, William Berry, Seymour Berry Editors; Reg Eves; John Alexander Hammerton; Leonard Matthews; Charles Ray; Henry Beckles Willson Writers; Herbert Allingham; Edwy Searles Brooks, Henry St. John Cooper; Robert Murray Graydon; William Murray Graydon; Charles Hamilton; Arthur Mee; Andrew Nicholas Murray; Frank S. Pepper; George Hamilton Teed; Hugo Tyerman Artists; Freddie Adkins; Alex Akerbladh; John Jukes; Frank Minnitt
- Publication types: Newspapers, story papers, comics, magazines, paperbacks
- Imprints: The Educational Book Company
- Owner(s): Alfred Harmsworth (1890–1922); Allied Newspapers (1926–1937); William Berry (1937–1959); IPC (1959)

The Amalgamated Press (AP) was a British newspaper and magazine publishing company founded by journalist and entrepreneur Alfred Harmsworth (1865–1922) in 1901, gathering his many publishing ventures together under one banner. At one point the largest publishing company in the world, AP employed writers such as Arthur Mee, John Alexander Hammerton, Edwy Searles Brooks, and Charles Hamilton. Its subsidiary, the Educational Book Company, published The Harmsworth Self-Educator, The Children's Encyclopædia, and Harmsworth's Universal Encyclopaedia. The company's newspapers included the Daily Mail, the Daily Mirror, The Evening News, The Observer, and The Times. At its height, AP published over 70 magazines and operated three large printing works and paper mills in South London.

== History ==
=== Harmsworth Brothers Ltd ===
In 1888 Alfred Harmsworth and his younger brother Harold (1868–1940) started Harmsworth Brothers, with Alfred acting as publisher and Harold handling the finances. The first thing they did was found a paper called Answers to Correspondents, which was modeled after another popular paper called Tit-Bits (published by George Newnes). Harmsworth entered the comic magazine market in 1890 with Comic Cuts and Illustrated Chips; The comic Wonder, launched in 1892, was part of a long string of connected titles which stretched from 1892 to 1953, known by a variety of additional names, including Funny Wonder and Jester.

Also in 1890, Harmsworth began publishing periodicals to challenge and compete with the penny dreadfuls popular among British youth. Priced at one half-penny, Harmsworth's story papers were cheaper and, at least initially, were more respectable than the competition. Harmsworth claimed to be motivated by a wish to challenge the pernicious influence of penny dreadfuls. AP's Halfpenny Marvel, launched in 1893, was soon followed by a number of other Harmsworth half-penny periodicals, such as The Union Jack (1894–1933) and Pluck (also started in 1894), and the serialized boys' story papers The Boys' Friend (1895). At first the stories were high-minded moral tales, reportedly based on true experiences, but it was not long before these papers started using the same kind of material as the publications they competed against.

Beginning in 1894, the Harmsworth brothers dove into the newspaper business, first acquiring The Evening News and the Edinburgh Daily Record. Harmsworth founded the Daily Mail in 1896, which was a success, having the world record for daily circulation until Harmsworth's death.

Harmsworth founded the woman's magazine Home Chat (1895–1959) to compete with C. Arthur Pearson's Home Notes.

In 1896, Harmsworth Brothers Ltd was incorporated as a limited company. By this time, combined weekly sales of the company's publications exceeded one million copies, more than any other magazine publisher in the world.

=== Formation and expansion of Amalgamated Press ===
In 1901, Harmsworth gathered his many publishing ventures together under the banner of Amalgamated Press.

In 1902, the company opened offices in Manchester, also setting up a system of codes and telegraphs that streamlined the layout and printing process.

Expanding his newspaper empire, Harmsworth initiated the Daily Mirror during 1903, and rescued the financially desperate The Observer and The Times during 1905 and 1908, respectively. During 1908, he also acquired The Sunday Times.

The quality of the AP story papers began to improve throughout the early 20th century. They also proliferated, with AP launching new boys' papers like The Gem (1907–1939) and The Magnet (1908–1940). By the time of the First World War, papers such as Union Jack dominated the market in the UK. (Note: Editorials in early issues of papers such as the Union Jack or The Boys' Friend make frequent references to "the blood and thunders", but as time went on the mentions disappeared. Letters sent in by parents or teachers were frequently printed, praising the papers for putting the "trash" out of business.) Post-World War I story papers launched by AP included The Champion (1922–1955) and The Thriller (1929–1937).

Recognizing the popularity of the story papers with girls, AP editor Reg Eves launched a girl's line, the most notable being School Friend (1919–1929), Schoolgirls' Own (1921–1936), and The Schoolgirl (1922–1923; 1929–1940).

AP's My Magazine was published from 1908 to 1933 with different names; it had articles on science, technology, geography, and current events.

From 1912 Amalgamated Press was based at Fleetway House in Farringdon Street, London.

Amalgamated Press acquired the assets of James Henderson & Sons Ltd in 1920.

AP story papers faced tougher competition in the 1930s with the rise of DC Thomson's line, including The Hotspur (launched in 1933).

Comic Cuts and Illustrated Chips continued strongly into the 20th century; other notable pre-War humorous comics titles published by AP included Film Fun (launched in 1920), Radio Fun (1938), and Knockout (1939).

=== Harmsworth's death; Allied Newspapers; William Berry ===
Alfred Harmsworth died in 1922, and in 1926 Amalgamated Press was bought by William and Gomer Berry of Allied Newspapers. Shortly after this sale, in 1927, AP acquired and continued publishing a number of Cassell & Co.'s periodicals, including Cassell's Magazine, The Story-Teller, and Chums.

The Berry brothers dissolved their partnership in 1937, with William Berry (Lord Camrose) retaining Amalgamated Press.

Editor Leonard Matthews (1914–1997), who joined AP in 1939, was a leading figure in the company's comics titles for 20 years, eventually becoming Manager Editor.

The onset of World War II, in the years 1940–1942, brought the merger and cancellation of a number of long-running AP comics titles, including Butterfly and Puck (both launched in 1904), Jester (launched in 1912), Tiger Tim's Weekly (1919), Sunbeam (1922), The Joker (1927), Larks (1927), Bubbles (1921), Chicks' Own (1929), and Funny Wonder series 3 (dating back to 1914).

Seymour Berry, 2nd Viscount Camrose, the eldest son of William Berry, was Vice Chairman of Amalgamated Press from 1942 until the company's sale in 1959.

In May 1949, AP acquired the publisher J. B. Allen, including their comics titles The Comet and Sun, which they continued under the same names. AP launched a number of notable comics in the 1950s, including School Friend (launched in 1950; considered the first girls' comic), Lion (1952), Tiger (1954), and the young children's comics Jack and Jill and Playhour (both 1954).

Another round of mergers and cancellations of long-running AP comics titles occurred in the years 1952–1957, including Illustrated Chips and Comic Cuts (both launched in 1890), Jingles (launched in 1934), Tip Top (launched in 1934), Playbox (launched in 1925), The Rainbow (launched in 1914), and Tiny Tots (launched in 1920).

=== Acquisition by the Mirror Group/IPC ===
In 1959, Amalgamated Press was bought by the Mirror Group and renamed Fleetway Publications (after the name of AP's headquarters, Fleetway House). AP titles that were continued by IPC/Fleetway included:

- Confessions Library (1959 series)
- Cowboy Picture Library (1950 series; originally known as Cowboy Comics)
- Famous Romance Library (1956 series)
- Film Fun (1920 series)
- Girls' Crystal (1935 series)
- Knockout (1939 series)
- Lion (1952 series)
- Marilyn (1955 series)
- Playhour (1954 series)
- Radio Fun (1938 series)
- Roxy (1958 series)
- School Friend (1950 series)
- Super Detective Library (1953 series)
- Thriller Comics (1951 series)
- Tiger (1954 series)
- Top Spot (1958 series)
- TV Fun (1953 series)
- Valentine (1957 series)

With the transition to Fleetway, the AP titles The Comet, Sun, and Tiny Tots were all merged into other AP titles: Tiger, Lion, and Playhour, respectively. Radio Fun was continued by Fleetway for a short time and then merged into Buster in 1960. Similarly, TV Fun was renamed TV Fan, continued for a short time, and then was merged into Valentine.

In 1961, the Mirror Group also acquired Odhams Press (which by that point owned Longacre Press and Newnes/Pearson). The group was renamed the International Publishing Corporation in 1963, although the component companies continued to use their own names until 1968 when they were reorganised into the unitary IPC Magazines. The "Fleetway" banner continued to be used for some publications until IPC's comics line was sold under the name Fleetway Publications to Robert Maxwell in 1987.

Of the comics titles IPC acquired from Amalgamated Press, only five survived into the 1970s: Jack and Jill, Lion, Playhour, Tiger, and Valentine; of those five, Jack and Jill, Playhour, and Tiger survived until the mid-1980s.

Rebellion Developments currently owns all comics characters and titles created by IPC's subsidiaries after 1 January 1970, together with 26 specified characters which appeared in Buster; while IPC currently retains its other comics characters and titles, including Sexton Blake, The Steel Claw, and Battler Britton.

== Newspapers ==
- Daily Mail (founded 1896; acquired by Harold Harmsworth in 1922)
- Daily Mirror (founded 1903; sold to Harold Harmsworth in 1913)
- The Evening News (acquired in 1894; sold to Harold Harmsworth in 1922)
- Edinburgh Daily Record (founded 1894)
- The Observer (acquired in 1903; sold in 1911)
- The Sunday Times (acquired in 1908; sold in 1915)
- The Times (acquired in 1908; sold in 1922)

== Books ==
- The Boy's Book of Everyday Science (1937), edited by Charles Ray
- The Concise Household Encyclopedia (1932–1939) edited by J A Hammerton.
- Everybody's Enquire Within, edited by Charles Ray, published in 55 weekly instalments from 1937 to 1938.
- The Great War: The Standard History of the All-Europe Conflict (1914-1919), edited by Wilson and Hammerton
- Harmsworth's Universal Encyclopaedia (1921/1922)
- "Wonders" — all edited by Clarence Winchester, and published by Amalgamated Press as weekly instalments, with a book binding service available to keep as two volumes for each series.
  - Railway Wonders of the World, 50 installments (1935–36)
  - Shipping Wonders of the World, 55 installments (1936–37)
  - Wonders of World Engineering, 53 installments (1937–38)
  - Wonders of World Aviation, 40 installments (1938)
- The World of Wonder: 10,000 Things Every Child Should Know (1933), edited by Charles Ray. Published in two volumes: Vol. One, pages 1 to 732; Vol. Two, pages 733 to 1460. An illustrated compendium of mainly science and technology, with some historical subjects.

== Periodicals ==
- Cassell's Magazine (1927–1932) — acquired from Cassell & Co., where it originated in 1897; merged into Storyteller
- The Children's Encyclopædia (1908–1964)
- The Children's Newspaper (1919–1965)
- Everybody's Weekly (1950–1959) — acquired from Everybody's Publications Ltd., where it originated in 1913; merged into Odhams' John Bull
- The Green Magazine (1922–1923)
- The Harmsworth Red Magazine (1908–1939)
- The Harmsworth Self-Educator (1905–1907)
- Home Chat (1895–1959)
- London Magazine (1898–1933)
- The Modern Boy (1928–1939)
- My Magazine (1908–1933)
- Picture Show (1919–1960)
- Storyteller (1927–1937) — acquired from Cassell & Co., where it originated in 1907
- Woman & Home (from 1926)
- Woman's Weekly (from 1911)
- The World (1905-1920), a weekly society paper originated in 1874 — acquired from the widow of Edmund Hodgson Yates in 1905
- The Yellow Magazine (1921–1926)

== Story papers ==
- The Boys' Friend (1895–1927)
- The Boys' Herald (1903–1913)
- The Boy's Realm (1902–1916; 1919–1929)
- The Champion (1922–1955)
- Chums (1927–1941) — acquired from Cassell & Co., where it originated in 1892
- The Gem (1907–1939)
- Halfpenny Marvel (1893–1922)
- The Magnet (1908–1940)
- Pluck (1894–1916; 1922–1924)
- School Friend (1919–1929)
- The Schoolgirl (1922–1923; 1929–1940)
- Schoolgirls' Own (1921–1936)
- The Thriller (1929–1937)
- The Triumph (1924–1940)
- The Union Jack (1894–1933)

== Notable comics titles ==
Title	Starting year	Ending year	Issues	Merged with	Notes
Bo-Peep and Little Boy Blue	1929	1934	245	Chicks' Own	
Bubbles	1921	1941	1,024	Chicks' Own	
Butterfly	1904	1940	1,862	Tip Top	Title is Butterfly and Firefly for 446 issues from 1917 to 1925
Chicks' Own	1920	1957	1,605		Also published 33 annuals from 1924 to 1957
The Comet	1949	1959	510	Tiger	Launched by J. B. Allen in 1946; acquired by AP in 1949
Comic Cuts	1890	1953	3,006	Knockout	
Comic Home Journal	1895	1904	488		
Crackers	1929	1941	615	Jingles	
Famous Romance Library	1956	1961	171		
Film Fun	1920	1962	2,222	Buster	Published 23 annuals from 1938 to 1961
Funny Wonder 1st series	1893	1899	325		Leads right into Funny Wonder 2nd series
Funny Wonder 2nd series	1899	1901	109		Numbering continues with Wonder series 2
Funny Wonder 3rd series	1914	1942	1,404	Wonder series 4	Numbering continues from Halfpenny Wonder (1914 series); numbering continues with Wonder series 4; also published 5 annuals from 1937 to 1942
Girls' Crystal	1953	1963	524	School Friend	Numbering continues from Girls' Crystal story paper (launched in 1935); published 39 annuals from 1939 to 1978
Illustrated Chips initial run	1890	1890	6		
Illustrated Chips main series	1890	1952	2,997	Film Fun	
Jack and Jill	1954	1985	1,640 (c.)		
Jester and Wonder	1902	1912	506	Jester	Numbering continues from Wonder series 2
Jester	1912	1940	1,312	Funny Wonder	Title is Jolly Jester from 1920 to 1924
Jingles	1934	1954	741	TV Fun	
The Joker	1927	1940	655	Illustrated Chips	
Kinema Comic	1920	1932	651	Film Fun	
Knockout	1939	1963	1,240	Valiant	Published 16 "Fun Books" from 1941 to 1955, and 6 annuals from 1956 to 1961
Larks	1927	1940	656	Comic Cuts	
Lion	1952	1974	1,156	Valiant	Published 767 issues with IPC
Marilyn	1955	1965	549	Valentine	
Merry and Bright the Favorite Comic	1910	1935	1,265	Butterfly	Titled simply Merry and Bright for 337 issues from 1910 to 31 March 1917
My Favourite	1928	1934	351	Sparkler	
Playbox 1st series	1898	1898	2		
Playbox 2nd series	1905	1913	105		Published 48 annuals from 1909 to 1956
Playbox 3rd series	1925	1955	1,279	Jack and Jill	Published 48 annuals from 1909 to 1956
Playhour	1954	1987	1,700 (c.)		Originally titled Playhour Pictures
Playtime	1919	1929	550		
Puck	1904	1940	1,867	Sunbeam	
Radio Fun	1938	1960	1,029	Buster	Published 21 annuals from 1940 to 1960
The Rainbow	1914	1956	1,898	Tiny Tots	Published 10 annuals from 1927 onward
Roxy	1958	1963	288	Valentine	
School Friend	1950	1965	762	June	
Sun	1949	1959	517	Lion	Launched by J. B. Allen in 1947; acquired by AP in 1949; was called Sun Comic for 122 issues from 1949 to March 22, 1952
Sunbeam	1922	1940	920	Tiny Tots	
Thriller Comics	1951	1963	450		
Tiger	1954	1985	1,571 (c.)	Eagle	Published c. 1,310 issues with IPC
Tiger Tim's Weekly	1919	1940	1,087	Rainbow	Originally called Tiger Tim's Tales for 28 issues (1919–1920)
Tiny Tots	1927	1959	1,334	Playhour	
Tip Top	1934	1954	727	TV Fun	
TV Fun	1953	1960	333	Valentine	Becomes TV Fan from 19 September 1959 to 30 January 1960; published 4 annuals from 1957 to 1960
Valentine	1957	1974	919	Mirabelle	
Wonder 1st series	1892	1893	27		Restarted as Funny Wonder (1892–1899)
Wonder 2nd series	1901	1902	49	Jester and Wonder	Called Wonder and Jester for 2 issues, 10 May 1902 to 17 May 1902; numbering continues in Jester and Wonder
Wonder 3rd series	1913	1914	64	Halfpenny Wonder	Numbering continued from Penny Wonder; numbering continued in Halfpenny Wonder (which becomes Funny Wonder 3rd series)
Wonder 4th series	1942	1953	317		Numbering continues from Funny Wonder series 3
