= The Children's Newspaper =

British newspaper aimed at children

The Children's Newspaper was a long-running newspaper published by the Amalgamated Press (later Fleetway Publications) aimed at pre-teenage children founded by Arthur Mee in 1919. It ran for 2,397 weekly issues before being merged with Look and Learn in 1965.

== Background ==
Following the successful publication of The Children's Encyclopædia as a part-work between 1908 and 1910, the title was immediately relaunched as The New Children's Encyclopædia. This new edition, published in monthly parts from March 1910, added a supplement in September 1910 entitled The Little Paper which carried news stories of interest to children. This idea was expanded by Mee into the 12-page, tabloid-sized Children's Newspaper which debuted on 22 March 1919, priced 1½d.

Subtitled The Story of the World Today for the Men and Women of Tomorrow, the paper epitomised Mee's values and reflected the editor's twin faiths of Christian ethics and the British Empire. Mee believed that children could be guided to better, more creative lives through education. His aim for the Encyclopaedia was to give the nation's children a firm grasp of subjects such as history and geography and practical. The Children's Newspaper was designed to keep young people up to date with the latest in world news and science.

At its peak, The Children's Newspaper sold 500,000 copies a week. Following Mee's death in 1943, Hugo Tyerman took over the editorial reins. Sales began to fall after the Second World War as rival publications, notably the Eagle, Junior Mirror and Junior Express, began to appear. It was not until the mid-1950s that The Children's Newspaper began to modernise, adding features on television and sports and including interviews with popular sporting personalities.

In January 1962, Fleetway Publications launched the educational weekly entitled Look and Learn. The black and white Children's Newspaper suffered by comparison and despite attempts to attract a teenage audience by adding a column for girls and a 'Pop Spot' featuring photos of popular singers and groups, sales continued to slip. The Children's Newspaper came to an end on 1 May 1965 after 2,397 issues.

In November 2004, the rights to the magazine were purchased by Look and Learn Magazine Ltd. who began posting issues for viewing or downloading on their website in April 2007.
