= Tom Merry =

Fictional character

Tom Merry's Own - Boys' Annual

Tom Merry is a fictional principal character in the "St Jim's" stories which appeared in the boy's weekly paper, The Gem, from 1907 to 1939. The stories were all written using the pen-name of Martin Clifford, the majority by Charles Hamilton who was more widely known as Frank Richards, the creator of Billy Bunter.

== Origins ==
The first Tom Merry story appeared in Gem number 3 dated 10 March 1907 and introduced him as a new boy at a school called Clavering College. In issue number 11, Clavering was closed down and the boys and masters transferred to St Jim's, a school which has previously featured in the boy's paper Pluck. From this time onwards the pattern was established and St Jim's and, Tom Merry made weekly appearances.

== Character ==
In his initial appearance, Merry was a likeable boy who was dominated by his overbearing nurse and guardian, Miss Priscilla Fawcett. As the years passed her influence disappeared and Merry became the acknowledged leader of the lower school of St Jim's and the focal point of most of the stories.

As his name suggests, he was cheerful and good humoured. He was also good at sports and a natural leader. With his friends, Manners and Lowther, he formed a group known as the 'Terrible Three' who were looked up to by all other juniors.

== After The Gem ==
After a lull, interest in Charles Hamilton's writing increased during the 1950s and further St Jim's stories were published by Spring Books from about 1949 and by Mandeville from the 1950s. There were 13 books in all which books re-introduced the characters that appeared in The Gem in pre-war days. St. Jim's stories were also published in six Tom Merry Annuals published by Mandeville from 1949 to 1954. Eleven Tom Merry stories were also published in the 1950s by Gold Hawk in paperback form.

In the 1970s Howard Baker Press published over 20 Gem Volumes in facsimile form.

== See also ==
- The Magnet
