= The Children's Encyclopædia =

Book by Arthur Mee

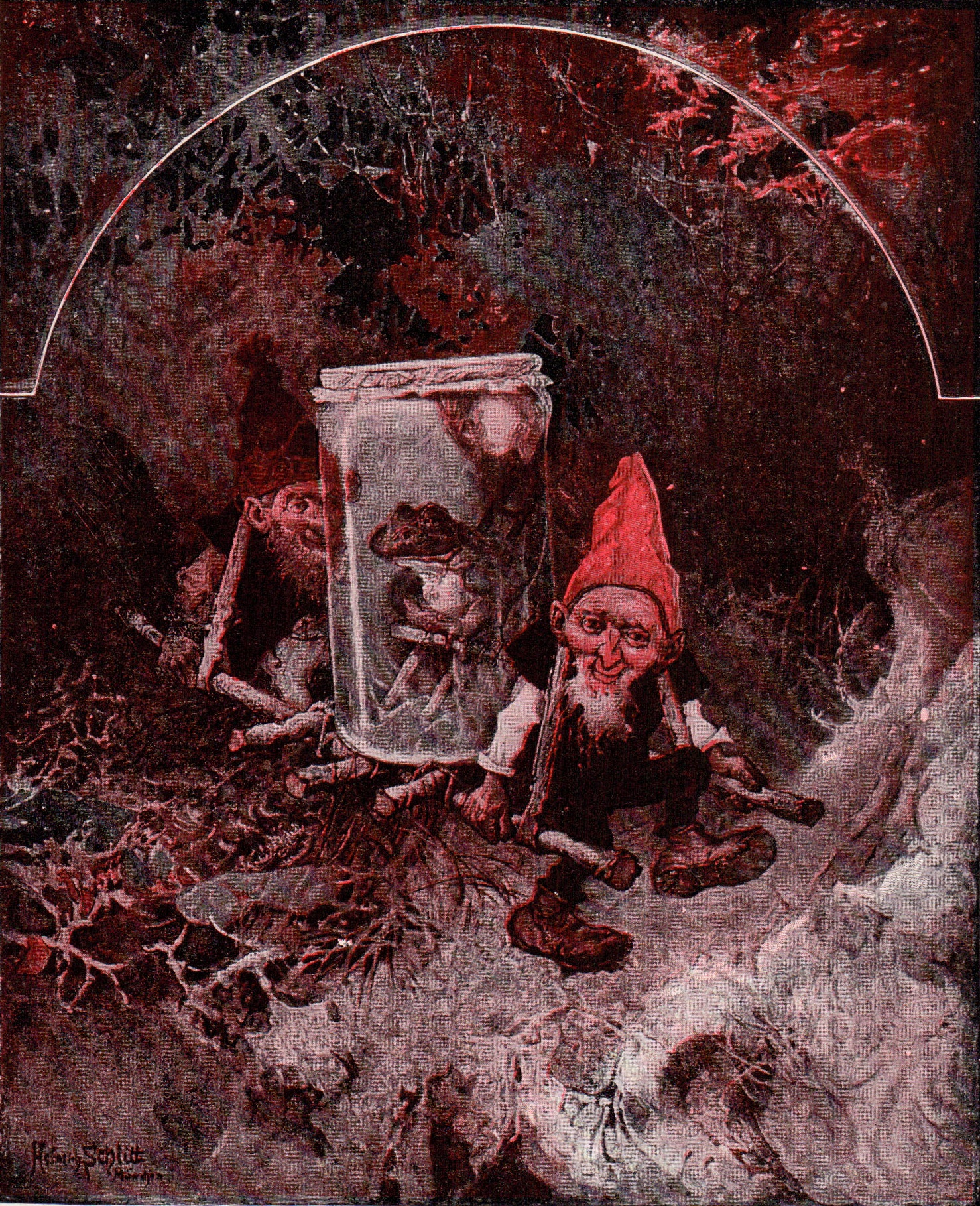
The Goblins in the Gold-Mine

The Children's Encyclopædia was an encyclopaedia originated by Arthur Mee, and published by the Educational Book Company, a subsidiary of Northcliffe's Amalgamated Press, London. It was published from 1908 to 1964. Walter M. Jackson's company Grolier acquired the rights to publish it in the U.S. under the name The Book of Knowledge (1910).

== Contents ==
The encyclopaedia was originally published in fortnightly parts between March 1908 and February 1910. Some readers could have bound their collections, but the first eight-volume sets were published in 1910. Each section contained a variety of articles, developing topics as it progressed. The work could be used as a conventional reference library, as the last volume had an alphabetical index, or each section could be read from start to finish. It was originally organised into sections but there were changes in subsequent editions. Some titles covered scientific subjects such as geology, biology and astronomy but such scientific terms were generally avoided.

- Familiar Things, by "many writers"
- Wonder, by the Wise Man
- Nature, by Ernest Bryant and Edward Step
- The Child's Own Life, by Dr. Caleb Saleeby
- The Earth, by Dr. Caleb Saleeby
- All Countries, by Frances Epps
- Great Lives, by "many writers"
- Golden Deeds, by "many writers"
- Bible Stories, by Harold Begbie
- Famous Books, by John Hammerton
- Stories, by Edward Wright
- Poetry, by John Hammerton
- "School Lessons", by several writers, including Lois Mee, Arthur's sister
- Things To Make and Things To Do, by "many writers"

Mee wrote an introduction called a "Greeting" and a "farewell". He took a strong interest in the "Book of Wonder", in which the Wise Man answered questions posed by children.

The illustrations were mostly anonymous but some illustrators included Susan Beatrice Pearse, C. E. Brock, Thomas Maybank, George F. Morrell, Dudley Heath, Charles Folkard, H. R. Millar, Alexander Francis Lydon, Arthur A. Dixon and Arthur Rackham. The books used photographs by Frank Hinkins, engravings, maps and graphics.

The encyclopaedia broke ground in the approach to education, aiming to make learning interesting and enjoyable. Its articles were clearly written and intended to develop character and sense of duty.

The articles expressed pride for Great Britain and its empire. Christianity was held to be the only true religion. Europeans were clearly the most advanced and there were hints of the eugenic ideas of Caleb Saleeby. This was presented in a moderate and liberal way in many areas: other "races", although inferior according to the text, were to be treated with respect, and imperialism was justified only if it improved the lot of its subjects. At a time when the relation between science and religion was controversial, the encyclopaedia supported evolution and it did not see any contradiction between religious teachings and Darwin's views.

== Distribution ==
It was widely sold. It was used by schools and for teacher training. It gives insight into the social values of the society that created it. As the initial run ended, it was reissued as the monthly New Children's Encyclopædia. The title changed, becoming Children's Encyclopædia Magazine, Children's Magazine and, finally, My Magazine in 1914. From September 1910, the magazine included a supplement of news entitled The Little Paper, the forerunner of Arthur Mee's Children's Newspaper, launched in 1919.

== Editions ==
The Children's Encyclopædia sold 800,000 copies in 12 editions before being extensively revised in the early 1920s. The new 59-part, 7,412-page, 10-volume series debuted in October 1922 as The Children's Encyclopedia, the digraph having been dropped, and went through 14 editions by 1946 under the imprint of The Educational Book Co. Translations appeared in France, Italy, Spain, Brazil and China.

New editions of the encyclopaedia continued after Mee's death in 1943; the final, much revised, edition, still entitled Arthur Mee's Children's Encyclopedia, appeared in 1964.

While the encyclopaedia itself did not carry any copyright or publishing dates, clues are present in the title used and the colour and design on the cover as to the approximate age of a complete collection. The initial release of The Children's Encyclopædia featured the spelling "Encyclopædia" and was initially an eight-volume collection, bound in brown. All other revisions used the spelling "Encyclopedia" and were a ten-volume collection. 1920 versions have blue binding. By the 1940s the binding is brown in colour, and displays a flaming torch on each book's spine. By the 1950s, the binding is red. There is also at least one green bound version that dates from the 1920s. One edition with a red binding and art deco patterning on the spine dates to the mid 1930s.

In the mid-1960s the Library of Congress reported only the 1925 edition in 10 volumes and another edition in 1953, though a 1960 printing under the Waverley Book Company imprint was recorded as being the 28th edition. It was apparently also published under the names Harmsworth's Children's Encyclopedia and Mee's Children's Encyclopedia.

The set was bought out by the Grolier Society in 1963, when it was announced that the encyclopaedia would be phased out by 1970.

== Kashmir riots ==
In May 1973 riots occurred in Jammu and Kashmir, India, in an area where the Jamaat-e-Islami was gaining influence, sparked by the discovery that an illustration contained in The Book of Knowledge, which had been stored in a local library for decades, portrayed the Archangel Gabriel dictating portions of the Quran to Muhammad. Muslims offended by a visual depiction of Muhammad caused riots which left four dead and over a hundred wounded. The sale of the encyclopaedia was then banned, although it was already out of print by that time.
