= Film Fun =

British celebrity comic book (1920-1962)

- Film Fun annual 1947

Publication information
- Publisher: Amalgamated Press; Fleetway Publications
- Schedule: Weekly
- Genre: Action/adventureHumor/comedy
- Publication date: 17 January 1920 – 15 September 1962
- No. of issues: 2,225
- Editor: Frederick George Cordwell ("Eddie the Happy Editor")

Film Fun was a British celebrity comics comic book that ran from (issues dates) 17 January 1920 to 15 September 1962, when it merged with Buster, a total of 2,225 issues. There were also annuals in the forties and fifties. As the title suggests, the comic mainly featured comic strip versions of popular actors from films.

== Publication history ==
Film Fun was launched by Amalgamated Press (they would later release similar titles like Radio Fun, Sports Fun, and TV Fun). Pre-war circulation at its peak was around 800,000 copies per week.

The title was renamed Film Fun and Thrills in 1959 (when Amalgamated Press was bought by the Mirror Group; later known as IPC). In 1962, sales of Film Fun dropped below 125,000 a week, prompting IPC to merge the comic with Buster.

=== Mergers ===
Picture Fun merged with Film Fun soon after its launch in 1920, followed by Kinema Comic in 1932, Film Picture Stories in 1935, Illustrated Chips in 1953, and Top Spot in 1960.

== Eddie the Happy Editor ==
Frederick George Cordwell was better known to Film Fun fans as "Eddie the Happy Editor." Cordwell edited the comic until his death in 1949, aged 62 in Richmond, Surrey. Cordwell wrote many scripts for the strips as well as text stories for Film Fun. He introduced the idea of characters receiving huge plates of bangers and mash, giant Christmas puddings, and pies and such from grateful beneficiaries of their efforts. Cordwell even made it into the stories himself, "meeting" Laurel and Hardy a number of times, Joe E. Brown, Wheeler and Woolsey and other characters.

== Content ==
The cover of the first edition featured Harold Lloyd but named as "Winkle", the screen name by which he was known in Britain at the time. Apart from Laurel and Hardy, Film Fun used to feature many film and stage comedians of that era like Charlie Chaplin, Abbott and Costello, Buster Keaton, Ben Turpin, Jackie Coogan, Fatty Arbuckle, Joe E. Brown, George Formby, Wheeler & Woolsey, Max Miller, Lupino Lane, Red Skelton, Harold Lloyd (named Winkle in those days), W. C. Fields, Terry-Thomas, Sid Field, Frank Randle, Morecambe and Wise, James Cagney, Tony Hancock, Sid James, The Goon Show, Frankie Howerd, Tommy Cooper, Martin and Lewis, Arthur Lucan (in his drag role as Old Mother Riley) and Bruce Forsyth. There would also be serialised cowboy films featuring stars like Roy Rogers and Gene Autry. There were also detective stories featuring a fictional detective named Jack Keen.

== Contributing artists ==
- Walter Bell
- Bertie Brown
- Freddie Crompton
- Fred Holmes
- Albert Pease
- Tom Radford
- Eric Roberts
- George William Wakefield
- Terence Wakefield
- Jos "Josiah" Walker
- Norman Yendell Ward
- Roy Wilson

== Sources ==
- Film Fun at the Grand Comics Database
