= School Friend =

British weekly publications marketed toward girls

School Friend was the name of two different British weekly publications marketed toward girls, both of which were pioneering in their respective categories. Although both published by Amalgamated Press and both marketed toward girls, the content of the two publications was not directly related.

- School Friend (story paper), a story paper published from 1919 to 1929
- School Friend (comics), a comic published from 1950 to 1965
