= Story paper =

Type of magazine for young people (UK)

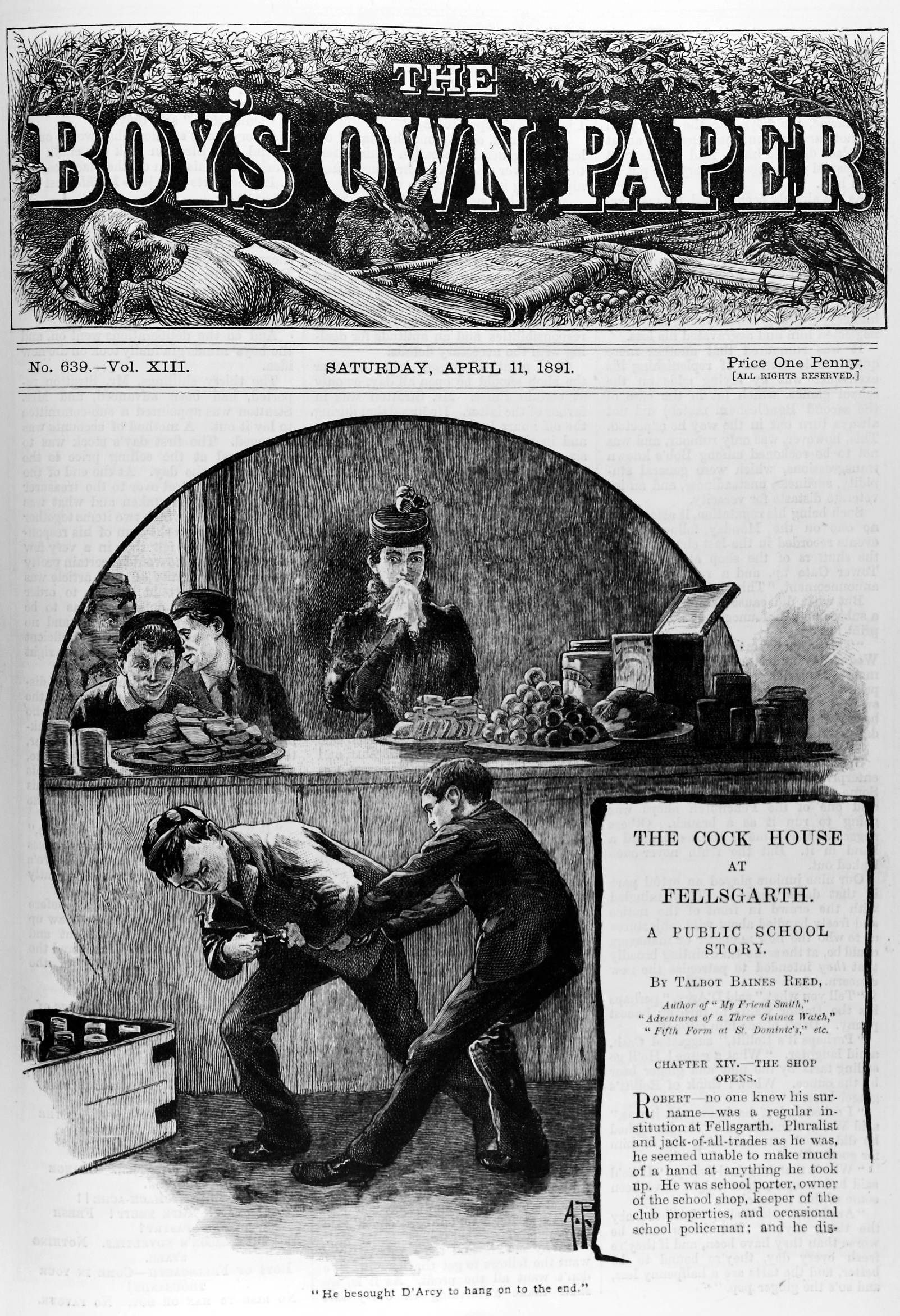
The Boy's Own Paper, front page, 11 April 1891

A story paper is a periodical publication similar to a literary magazine, but featuring illustrations and text stories, and aimed towards children and teenagers. Also known in Britain as "boys' weeklies", story papers were phenomenally popular before the outbreak of the Second World War. They are similar in content to the contemporary dime novels produced in the United States.

Among the most well-known British story papers was Boy's Own Paper, which ran from 1879 to 1967.

== Beginnings ==
The first known edition of what would later become known as a "story paper" was The Young Gentleman's Magazine, published in 1777. The first story paper to really take off was The Boys' and Girls' Penny Magazine, first published in September 1832.

In 1866, Charles Stephens began selling Boys of England on the English streets for a penny—the first "penny dreadful". Story papers in this style minimized the expense of writing in order to produce an extremely cheap product. Strictly speaking, the "penny dreadful" died off by the turn of the century, but this term was still used to refer to story papers throughout their history. The Halfpenny Marvel, first published in 1893, was "founded to counteract the pernicious influences of the Penny Dreadfuls", according to its title page. A book about these weeklies (also called "bloods" because of their savage contents) was created in 1948 by E. S. Turner, called Boys Will be Boys.

== Golden Age ==
Denis Gifford designated the period between World War I and World War II as the "Golden Age" of story papers. Sales of the story papers were at their highest during these years, as were the fecundity of the authors, the range in genre of magazines, and the colourful variety of the heroes. The most famous story paper hero, Sexton Blake, reached his apex during these years.

World War II caused chaos in Britain, and among other things the story papers had to be shut down as funds were redirected to the war. This is known as the Dark Ages for story papers, and nearly all of the papers ceased printing in 1939 or 1940.

== Silver Age and modern comics ==
In the 1950s and 1960s, some story papers such as The Rover briefly flourished, but television had a growing influence on the attentions of British children. Mergers between publishing houses finished off the remaining story papers, or modified them to become comic books, in the 1970s. The Rover was the last survivor and ceased publishing in 1973.

== Format and politics ==
George Orwell's essay, Boys' Weeklies, outlines the general themes of the story paper in the "Golden Age". As far as Orwell could tell, Britain was the only country in Europe in which story papers were produced. The Gem and The Magnet, the oldest of their kind, featured school serials always centred on a group of characters any reader could identify with. More recent story papers focused on adventure and intrigue, and had a large teenage readership.

According to Orwell, all of the English papers published at the time were stuck in the 1910s and had an underlying conservative slant, which taught children to be deferential to the upper-class. He suggested socialist values could be just as exciting if they followed the story paper format.

There were story papers for children of both sexes, although there was a broad overlap in the actual readership of the two.

== List of story papers ==
=== UK ===
- Adventure
- Aunt Judy's Magazine
- Big Budget
- Boy's Best Story Paper
- Boys' Broadcast
- Boy's Champion
- The Boys' Friend
- The Boys' Friend 3d Library
- Boys' Magazine
- Boys of England
- The Boy's Own Paper
- The Boys' Herald
- The Boys' Leader
- The Boys' Realm
- Bullseye
- The Captain
- The Champion
- The Children's Friend
- Chums
- Dixon Hawke Library
- The Dreadnought
- The Empire
- The Gem
- Girl's Best Friend
- Girls' Crystal
- The Girl's Home
- The Girl's Own Paper
- Girl's Reader
- The Girl's Realm
- Girl's Weekly
- The Greyfriars Herald
- The Hotspur
- Halfpenny Marvel (later renamed The Marvel)
- Jabberwock
- The Jester
- Joker
- Lion (boys' magazine)
- The Magnet
- The Modern Boy
- The Nelson Lee Library
- Our Girls
- Pals
- Peg's Paper
- The Penny Pictorial
- The Penny Popular
- The Pilot
- Pluck
- Public School Magazine
- The Ranger
- Red Arrow
- The Rover
- School and Sport
- School Friend
- Schoolgirls' Own
- Schooldays
- The Schoolgirl
- Schoolgirls' Weekly
- Scout
- The Sexton Blake Library
- The Skipper
- Startler
- The Thriller
- Tip Top
- The Triumph
- Union Jack
- The Vanguard
- The Wizard
- Young England magazine
- Young Folks

=== Ireland ===
- Our Boys (Ireland)

=== Australia ===
- The Silver Jacket

== See also ==
- Penny dreadful
- Pulp magazine
- Dime novel
- History of the British comic
- Serial (literature)
