= Radio Fun =

- Radio Fun 1958 annual

Publication information
- Publisher: Amalgamated Press (1938–1959); Fleetway Publications (1959–1961)
- Genre: Action/adventure, humor/comedy
- Publication date: 15 October 1938 - 18 February 1961
- No. of issues: 1167

Radio Fun was a British celebrity comics comic paper that ran from (issues dates) 15 October 1938 to 18 February 1961, when it became the first out of twelve titles to merge with Buster.

The comic strips included the uncredited work of industry regulars such as Roy Wilson and George and Reg Parlett. The format of the humorous strips was to pack in as many gags and slapstick situations as possible.

== Publication history ==
Wonder merged with it in 1953.

The title became Radio Fun and Adventures towards the end of its run.

Radio Fun ran for 1167 issues.

== Strips ==
The comic mainly featured comic strip versions of radio and film stars, including:

- Arthur Askey
- Benny Hill
- Bernard Bresslaw
- Charlie Chester
- Petula Clark
- Charlie Drake
- Clark Gable
- Tommy Handley
- Jimmy Jewel and Ben Warriss
- Tom Keene
- Sandy Powell
- Jack Warner
- Norman Wisdom

In its last few years, it ran a Superman strip abridged and reformatted from DC Comics. Other later cover strips were The Falcon and Wagon Train.

== Sources ==
- Radio Fun (Amalgamated Press, 1938 Series) at the Grand Comics Database
- Radio Fun (IPC, 1959 Series) at the Grand Comics Database
