= Arthur Mee =

British journalist and writer (1875–1943)

- Arthur Mee with The Children's Encyclopædia
- Born: 21 July 1875; Stapleford, Nottinghamshire, England
- Died: 27 May 1943 (aged 67); London, England
- Occupations: Writer, journalist, educator

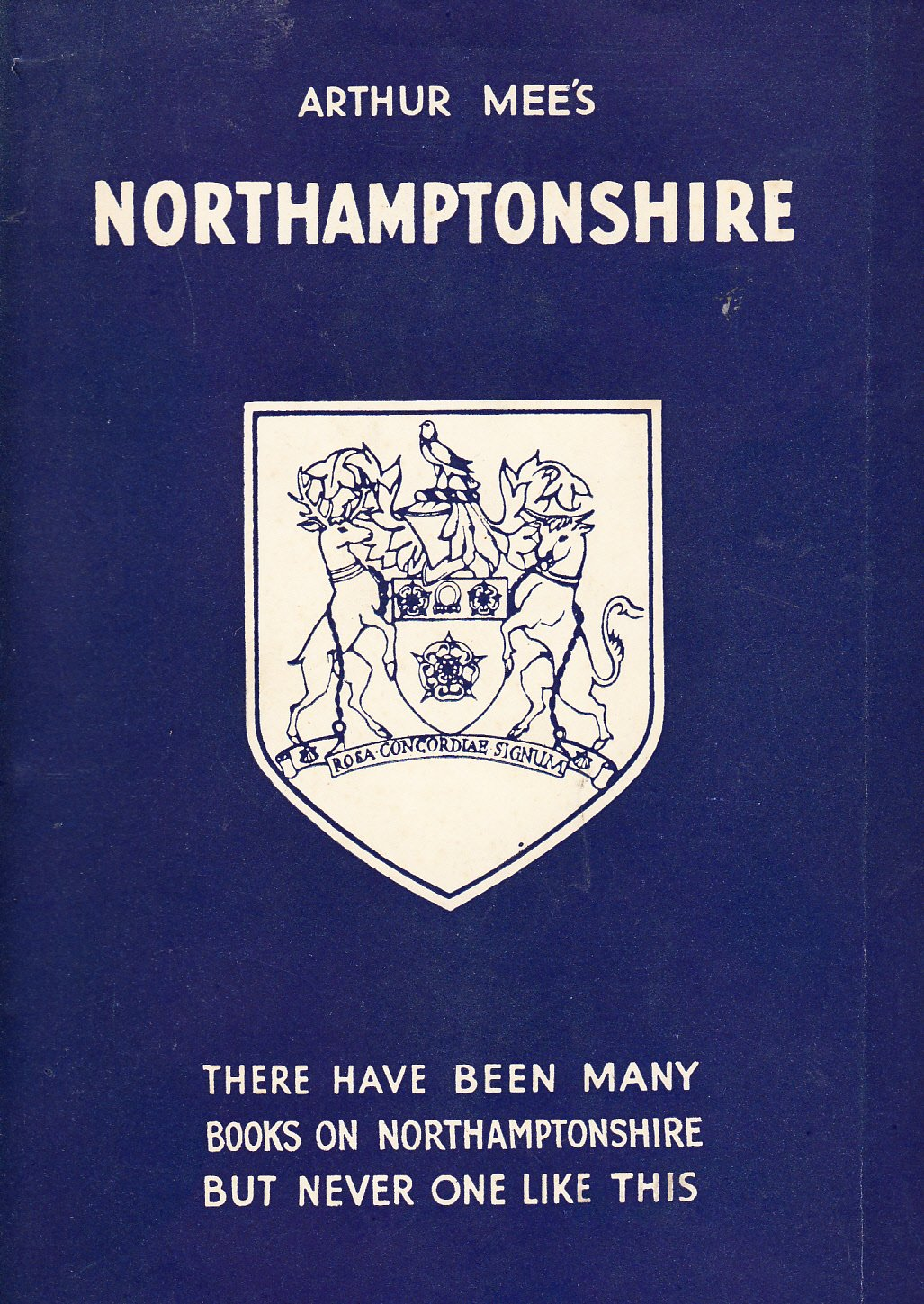
The Northamptonshire volume in The King's England series

Arthur Henry Mee (21 July 1875 – 27 May 1943) was an English writer, journalist and educator. He is best known for The Harmsworth Self-Educator, The Children's Encyclopædia, The Children's Newspaper, and The King's England.

== Early life ==
He was born on 21 July 1875 at Stapleford near Nottingham, England, the second of the ten children of Henry Mee (b. 1852), railway fireman, and his wife, Mary (née Fletcher). As a boy he earned money from reading the reports of Parliament to a local blind man.

== Career ==
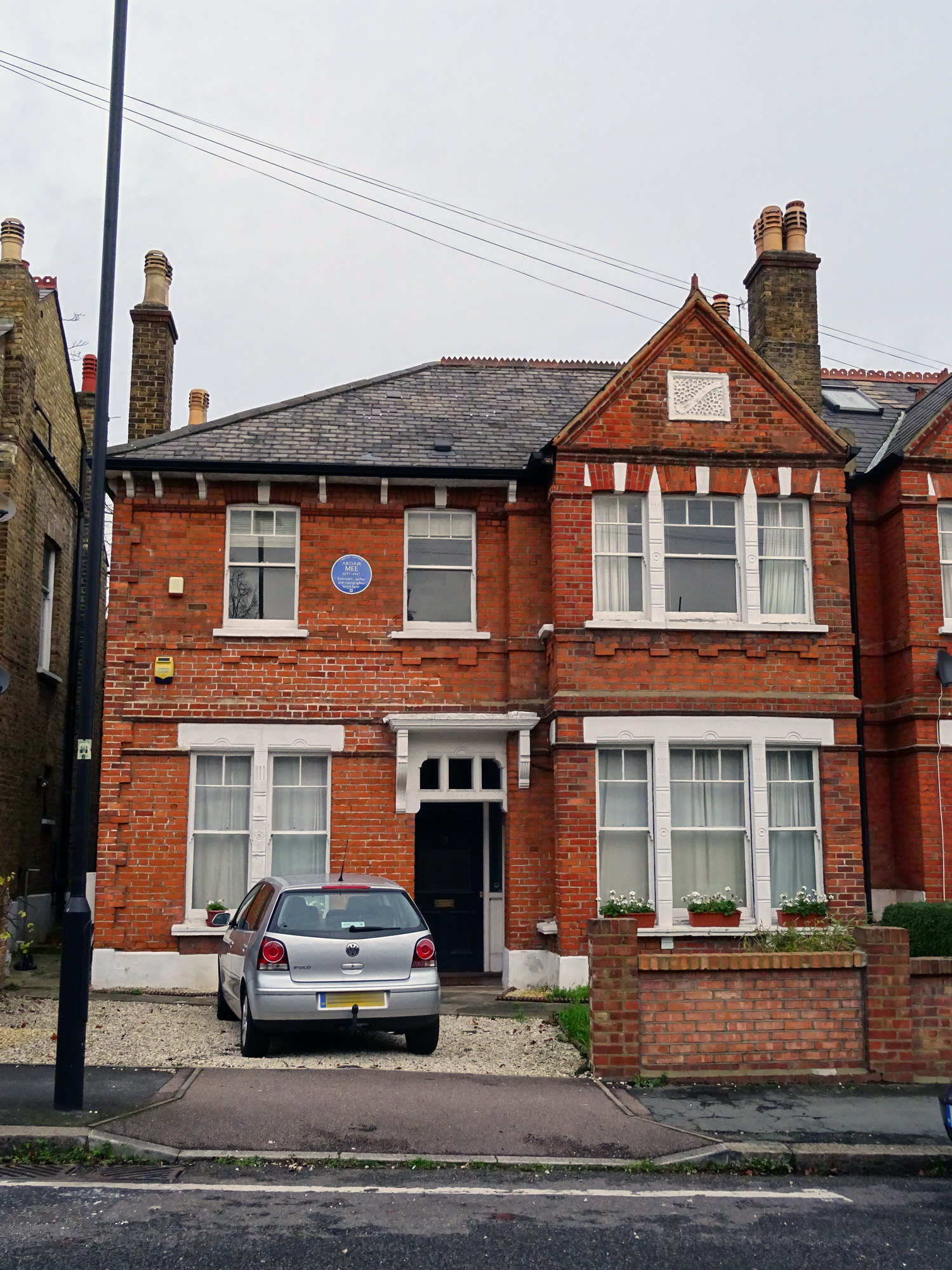
Mee's former home in Tulse Hill, London

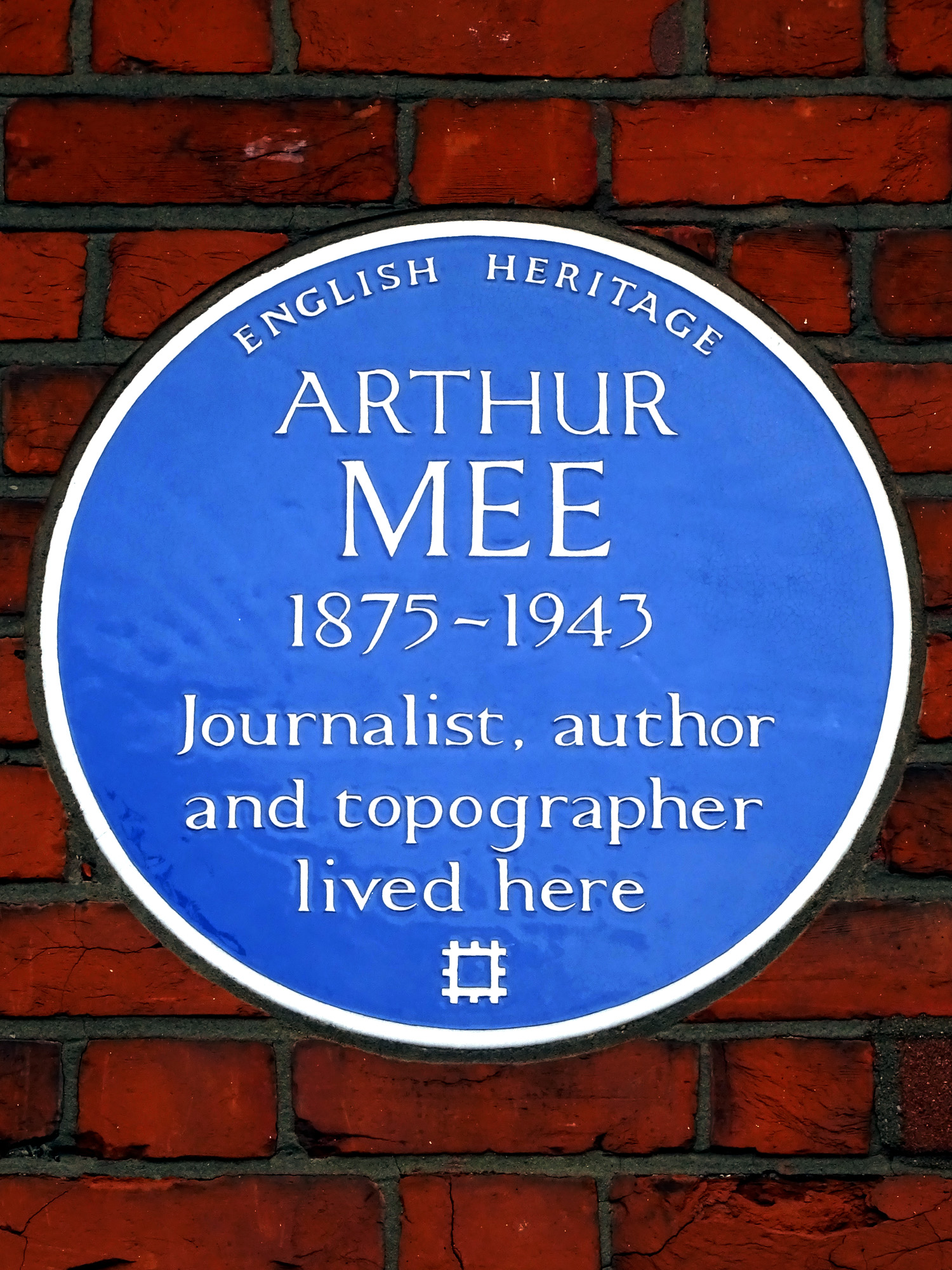
The blue plaque at Tulse Hill

Mee left school at 14 to join a local newspaper, where he became an editor by age 20. He contributed many non-fiction articles to magazines and joined the staff of the Daily Mail in 1898. He was made literary editor five years later.

In 1903 he began working for publisher Alfred Harmsworth's Amalgamated Press. He was appointed general editor of The Harmsworth Self-Educator (1905–1907), in collaboration with John Hammerton.

In 1908 he began work on The Children's Encyclopædia, which came out as a fortnightly magazine. The series was published and bound in eight volumes soon afterwards, and later expanded to ten volumes. After the success of The Children's Encyclopædia, he started the first newspaper published for children, the weekly Children's Newspaper, which was published until 1965.

Mee also wrote London – Heart of the Empire and Wonder of the World, which became a very popular book.

Although he made money from these works, he did not receive a fair share.

He had a large house built overlooking the hills near Eynsford in Kent. Its development from design to the final building was depicted in later editions of The Children's Encyclopædia.

Mee had one child, but, despite his work, declared that he had no particular affinity with children. His works for them suggest that his interest was in trying to encourage the raising of a generation of patriotic and moral citizens. He came from a Baptist upbringing, and supported the temperance movement.

== Death and legacy ==
He died in London aged 67. His books continued to be published after his death, most notably The King's England, a guide to the counties of England. Mee's works were successful abroad. The Children's Encyclopædia was translated into Chinese and sold well in the United States under the title The Book of Knowledge.

Mee exhibited a number of prejudices in his writing, notably anti-Catholic and anti-intellectual (which may best be illustrated by his treatment of Alexander of Hales in the Gloucestershire volume of The King's England). His writing dwells on the casualties of the First World War.

== Sources ==
- Gillian Elias (1993) Arthur Mee – Journalist in Chief to British Youth
- Maisie Robson (2003) Arthur Mee's Dream of England
- Enchanted Land: Half-a-Million Miles in the King's England, Introductory Volume to the UK series known as The King's England – (A New Domesday Book of 10,000 Towns and Villages); details of all the 41 titles obtained from a copy of The King's England series, originally published by Hodder and Stoughton, London, which were illustrated with 10,000 places and 6,000 photographs commencing about 1936
