= The Gem =

UK weekly boys' story paper

- The Gem, second series, Number 1, 1908
- Staff writers: Charles Hamilton (as "Martin Clifford")
- Frequency: Weekly
- Publisher: Amalgamated Press
- First issue: (1st series) February 1907 (2nd series) 15 February 1908
- Final issue Number: (1st series) 1907 (2nd series) December 1939 (1st series) 48 (2nd series) 1,663
- Country: United Kingdom

The Gem (1907–1939) was a story paper published in Great Britain by Amalgamated Press in the early 20th century, predominantly featuring the activities of boys at the fictional school St. Jim's. These stories were all written using the pen-name of "Martin Clifford," the majority by Charles Hamilton (who was more widely known as "Frank Richards," the author of most of the content of another story paper, The Magnet). Many issues also included a shorter serial story (a variety of detective, school, and adventure yarns were featured); these parts of the paper were not written by Charles Hamilton.

The most famous St Jim's characters were Tom Merry and Arthur Augustus D'Arcy, better known as Gussy, both of whom featured on many of the covers. A regular illustrator was R. J. Macdonald.

== History ==
=== The first series (issues 1-48) ===
The first issue appeared in February 1907 and featured an adventure story (as did issues 2, 4-6, 8, and 10). The first school story appeared in issue number 3, dated 10 March 1907, and introduced Tom Merry as a new boy at a school called Clavering College. In issue number 11, Clavering was closed down and the boys and masters transferred to St Jim's, a school which had previously featured in a boys' paper called Pluck. From then onwards a long story of St Jim's became the main weekly feature of The Gem.

=== The second series (issues 1-1663) ===
In the week ending 15 February 1908, The Gem started a new series, prompted by Amalgamated Press starting a new school story paper called The Magnet. Both the first and second series used a distinctive blue/green cover and the vast majority of stories were written by Charles Hamilton.

In 1919, the blue/green cover was replaced with a white cover and over the following years, Hamilton produced a reducing number of stories until by the mid-1920s, he only provided a minority of the stories that appeared, and in 1929 he produced no stories at all. Following a suggestion by Eric Fayne (who was a headmaster and a Charles Hamilton enthusiast) in 1931, The Gem started reprinting the early stories, beginning with the arrival of Tom Merry at St Jim's in issue 1221. This policy continued until spring 1939 when Hamilton was persuaded to resume writing for the paper starting with issue 1625. In 1933 the paper was merged with The Nelson Lee Library.

The paper ceased publication in December 1939, the result of declining circulation (down to 15,800 copies a week) and wartime paper shortages.

== See also ==
- The Magnet
- Charles Hamilton
- Tom Merry
