= Bunter =

Bunter or Bünter may refer to:

== Geography ==
- Bunter sandstone, a type of red sandstone common in large parts of western and central Europe
- Bunter (geology), a feature in geology

== Places ==
- Bunter Garten, German park

== Sport ==
- In baseball, a player who performs the action of bunting is called a bunter.
- Blyde River Bunters, South Africa field hockey club

== People ==
=== Nickname ===
- Aylmer Hunter-Weston (1864–1940), British Army officer known as "Hunter-Bunter"
- HugBunter, admin for Dread (forum)
- John Graham (loyalist)

=== Surname ===
- George Bunter, English rugby league footballer
- Jaromír Bünter (1930–2015), Czech ice hockey player
- Yasmin Bunter (born 1992), English footballer

== Fiction ==
=== Charles Hamilton ===
==== Characters ====
- Billy Bunter, a fictional character
- Bessie Bunter, Billy's sister

==== Works ====
- Billy Bunter of Greyfriars School, both a novel and TV show

===== School stories =====
- Billy Bunter's Banknote
- Billy Bunter in Brazil
- Billy Bunter's Christmas Party
- Billy Bunter's Barring-Out

=== Other ===
- Mervyn Bunter, valet to Lord Peter Wimsey, a fictional character created by Dorothy L. Sayers

== See also ==
- Bunter Hund
- Butner (disambiguation)
