= List of stories by Charles Hamilton =

The table below is a summary of the stories published by Charles Hamilton during his career.

== Listing - including stories published in book format ==
Subject matter	Pen-name	Publication	Dates	Estimated number of stories
Greyfriars School	Frank Richards	Magnet, Schoolboys' Own Library, Billy Bunter's Own, Skilton, Cassell	1908-1961	1,500
St Jim's School	Martin Clifford	Gem, Schoolboys Own Library, Tom Merry's Own, Goldhawk Books, Mandeville, Spring Books	1907-1956	1,000
Rookwood School	Owen Conquest	Boys' Friend Weekly, Greyfriars Holiday, Annual, Mandeville, Spring Books, Tom Merry's Own, Billy Bunter's Own	1915-1961	585
Cedar Creek School	Martin Clifford	Boys' Friend Weekly	1917-1921	205
Benbow Floating School	Owen Conquest	Greyfriars' Herald	1915-1920	20
Highcliffe School	Frank Richards	Boys' Friend Library	1915 - 1940	2
Sparshott School	Frank Richards	William C Merrett	1945-46	6
Carcroft School	Frank Richards	Hutchinson's Pie, The Silver Jacket, Tom Merry's Own	1944-55	50
Lynwood School	Frank Richards	JB Publications	1949	2
Topham School	Frank Richards	Mascot	1946-47	4
High Coombe - The School for Slackers	Charles Hamilton	Modern Boy, Popular	1935	20
Bendover School	Charles Hamilton	Pilot	1937	20
St Kit's	Charles Hamilton	Pluck	1907	49
Grimsdale School	Frank Richards	Ranger	1931-30	100
Headland House School	Hilda Richards	William C Merrett	1946	3
St Olive's School	Hilda Richards	Mascot	1946-47	3
Cliff House School	Hilda Richards	School Friend, Cassell	1919-1950	20
Herlock Sholmes - Spoof detective	Peter Todd	Greyfriars' Herald, The Magnet, The Gem, Tom Merry's Own Annual, The Penny Popular	1915-1954	100
King Cricket - story of county cricket	Charles Hamilton	Boys' Realm	1907	24
Football Fortune! (Blackdale School)	Charles Hamilton	Boys' Realm	1905-1906	11
Pelham School	Charles Hamilton	Boys' Realm	1910	33
St Dorothy's School	Charles Hamilton	Boys' Realm	1909-1910	36
Ken King - South Seas	Charles Hamilton	Modern Boy	1928-1939	208
The Popolaki Patrol - Africa	Charles Hamilton	Popular	1930	15
Rio Kid - Westerns	Ralph Redway	Modern Boy, Popular	1928-1938	60
Bunny Hare - Boy Adventurer	Charles Hamilton	Modern Boy	1930	12
Len Lex - Schoolboy Detective	Charles Hamilton	Modern Boy	1936-37	24
Jack Free / Jack of all Trades - Itinerant	Frank Richards	Mandeville, Spring Books, Tom Merry's Own, Billy Bunter's Own, Friars' Library	1949-2013	14
Romance	Winston Cardew	W.C. Merrett	1945-1946	5
Trapps Holmes general - Detective, Western, School	Gordon Conway, Freeman Fox, Hamilton Greening, Cecil Herbert, Prosper Howard, Robert Jennings, Gillingham Jones, T Harcourt Llewelyn, Clifford Owen, Ridley Redway, Raleigh Robbins, Eric Stanhope, Robert Stanley, Nigel Wallace, Talbot Wynyard,	Smiles, Funny Cuts, World's Comic, Picture Fun, Vanguard, Coloured Comic	1899-1910	In excess of 1,000
Early work - inc. pirate adventures	Various	Various	1894-1899	Not known

== Published in book format - generally post 1940 ==
After World War II, story papers had stopped being published so Hamilton was obliged to publish his stories in book format. The style of the stories did not change.

=== As Frank Richards ===
==== Billy Bunter novels ====
- Billy Bunter of Greyfriars School (1947)
- Billy Bunter’s Banknote (1948)
- Billy Bunter's Barring-Out (1948)
- Billy Bunter’s Christmas Party (1949)
- Billy Bunter in Brazil (1949)
- Billy Bunter’s Benefit (1950)
- Billy Bunter among the Cannibals (1950)
- Billy Bunter’s Postal Order (1951)
- Billy Bunter Butts In (1951)
- Billy Bunter and the Blue Mauritius (1952)
- Billy Bunter’s Beanfeast (1952)
- Billy Bunter’s Brain-Wave (1953)
- Billy Bunter’s First Case (1953)
- Billy Bunter the Bold (1954)
- Billy Bunter Does His Best (1954)
- Billy Bunter’s Double (1955)
- Backing Up Billy Bunter (1955)
- Lord Billy Bunter (1956)
- The Banishing of Billy Bunter (1956)
- Billy Bunter’s Bolt (1957)
- Billy Bunter Afloat (1957)
- Billy Bunter’s Bargain (1958)
- Billy Bunter the Hiker (1958)
- Bunter Out of Bounds (1959)
- Bunter Comes for Christmas (1959)
- Bunter the Bad Lad (1960)
- Bunter Keeps It Dark (1960)
- Billy Bunter’s Treasure-Hunt (1961)
- Billy Bunter at Butlins (1961)
- Bunter the Ventriloquist (1961)
- Bunter the Caravanner (1961)
- Billy Bunter’s Bodyguard (1962)
- Big Chief Bunter (1963)
- Just Like Bunter (1963)
- Bunter the Stowaway (1964)
- Thanks to Bunter (1964)
- Bunter the Sportsman (1965)
- Bunter’s Last Fling (1965)

==== "Jack" novels ====
- Jack of All Trades (1950)
- Jack’s the Lad (1955)
- Jack of the Circus (1955)
- Jack Goes South (2011)
- Jack in Africa (2012)
- Jack in Danger (2012)
- Jack on the Treasure Trail (2013)

==== Tom Merry novels ====
- Trouble for Tom Merry (1953)
- Down and Out (1953)
- Cardew’s Catch (1954)
- The Disappearance of Tom Merry (1954)
- Through Thick and Thin (1955)
- Tom Merry’s Triumph (1956)
- Tom Merry and Co, Caravanners (1956)

==== Other novels ====
- The Secret of the School (1946)
- The Black Sheep of Sparshott (1946)
- First Man In (1946)
- Looking After Lamb (1946)
- The Hero of Sparshott (1946)
- Pluck Will Tell (1946)
- Top Study at Topham (1947)
- Bunny Binks on the Warpath (1947)
- The Dandy of Topham (1947)
- Sent to Coventry (1947)
- The Lone Texan (1954)

=== as Hilda Richards ===
- The Girls of Headland House (1946)
- Under Becky's Thumb (1946)
- Winifred on the Warpath (1946)
- Pamela of St Olive's (1946)
- The Stranded Schoolgirls (1947)
- The Jape of the Term (1947)
- The St Olive's Sweepstake (1947)
- Bessie Bunter of Cliff House School (1949)

=== as Martin Clifford ===
[some of these were later reprinted with the author as Frank Richards]

- The Secret of the Study (1949)
- Talbot’s Secret (1949)
- Tom Merry and Co of St. Jim’s (1949)
- Rallying Round Gussy (1950)
- The Scapegrace of St. Jim’s (1951)
- Tom Merry’s Secret (1952)
- Tom Merry’s Rival (1952)
- The Man from the Past (1952)
- Who Ragged Ralton? (1952)
- Skimpole’s Snapshot (1952)
- Trouble for Trimble (1952)
- D’Arcy in Danger (1952)
- D’Arcy on the Warpath (1952)
- D’Arcy’s Disappearance (1952)
- D’Arcy the Reformer (1952)
- D’Arcy’s Day Off (1952)

=== as Owen Conquest ===
- The Rivals of Rookwood (1951)

== See also ==
- Charles Hamilton (writer)
- The Magnet
- The Gem
- Greyfriars School
- Billy Bunter
- Bessie Bunter
- Tom Merry
