= Billy Bunter in Brazil =

- Book cover from the first edition
- Author: Charles Hamilton writing as Frank Richards
- Language: English
- Genre: Children, Comedy
- Published: March 1949, Charles Skilton Ltd
- Publication place: United Kingdom
- Media type: Print (Hardback)
- Preceded by: Billy Bunter's Barring-Out
- Followed by: Billy Bunter's Christmas Party

Billy Bunter in Brazil is a school story by Charles Hamilton writing as Frank Richards, using the characters and settings of the Greyfriars School stories published from 1908 to 1940 in The Magnet. The book's retail price was 7s 6d.

First published in March 1949 by Charles Skilton Ltd, London, the fourth in a series of post-WWII hardback novels, it was subsequently reprinted by them in 1952 and 1959. It was reprinted in paperback by Armada Books in 1970, and in hardback in 1992 by Hawk Books. A Greyfriars School holiday story, the novel has a colour dust jacket, frontispiece and black and white illustrations by R. J. Macdonald.

== Origins ==
After the closure of The Magnet in May 1940 due to wartime paper shortages, author Charles Hamilton was contractually barred by the publisher, Amalgamated Press, from continuing to write Greyfriars stories. However, in 1946 publisher Charles Skilton negotiated the rights to publish new stories in book form. Hamilton, delighted, suggested a payment rate of £90 per book; but Skilton, short of capital, asked Hamilton to accept royalties instead. This proved to be greatly in Hamilton's favour: he received £1,000 instead of £90 for the first book.

Billy Bunter in Brazil is a holiday story, with the popular characters from the Greyfriars School stories returning to Brazil, having visited the country before in a previous The Magnet story. The author Charles Hamilton had never visited any country outside of Western Europe, and he made use of his extensive library of travel books to add local colour and language to his tale. It is not known if Hamilton had ever experienced air travel himself, but in the novel he allowed four chapters to describe the 40 hour flight to Rio de Janeiro.

== Synopsis ==
A trip to Brazil in the summer holidays to a plantation owned by Lord Mauleverer was an unexpected treat for Harry Wharton & Co. of the Greyfriars Remove, as well as for Billy Bunter, who for once didn't have to wrangle an invitation as Lord Mauleverer had invited him along with the others.

It was strange that when they reached Brazil Brian Mauleverer, the cousin of Lord Mauleverer and the plantation manager, had disappeared, leaving only a brief message. However, the boys enjoyed themselves in the care of the assistant manager, the suave but quick-tempered Martinho Funcho, in spite of several encounters with the dangerous bandit O Corvo (The Crow). The whereabouts of the missing manager were discovered by astute detective work on the part of Hurree Jamset Ram Singh; and good food being plentiful, Billy Bunter decided that he would prefer to stay indefinitely than return to the doubtful pleasures of Greyfriars School.

Fortunately for the followers of the immortal 'Owl of the Remove', his decision was not final, though the tour to Brazil remains a thrilling interlude in his exploits.
