= Billy Bunter's Banknote =

- Book cover from the first edition
- Author: Charles Hamilton writing as Frank Richards
- Language: English
- Genre: Children, Comedy
- Published: October 1948, Charles Skilton Ltd
- Publication place: United Kingdom
- Media type: Print (Hardback)
- Preceded by: Billy Bunter of Greyfriars School
- Followed by: Billy Bunter's Barring-Out

Billy Bunter's Banknote is a school story by Charles Hamilton writing as Frank Richards, using the characters and settings of the Greyfriars School stories published from 1908 to 1940 in The Magnet. The book's retail price was 7s 6d.

First published in October 1948 by Charles Skilton Ltd, London, in an edition of 11,000 copies, the second in a series of post-WWII hardback novels, it was subsequently reprinted by them in 1949, 1953 and 1959, and by Hawk in January 1991. It has a dust jacket, colour frontispiece and black and white illustrations by R. J. Macdonald, who became seriously ill following a gardening accident; this delayed publication and the novel was eventually published alongside the third book in the series, Billy Bunter's Barring-Out in October 1948. An audiobook narrated by Martin Jarvis is available from CSA Word.

== Origins ==
After the closure of The Magnet in May 1940 due to wartime paper shortages, author Charles Hamilton was contractually barred by the publisher, Amalgamated Press, from continuing to write Greyfriars stories. However in 1946 publisher Charles Skilton negotiated the rights to publish new stories in book form. Hamilton, delighted, suggested a payment rate of £90 per book; but Skilton, short of capital, asked Hamilton to accept royalties instead. This proved to be greatly in Hamilton's favour: he received £1,000 instead of £90 for the first book.

== Synopsis ==
The Headmaster of Greyfriars School, Dr. Locke, is a bad judge of character when it comes to appointing new staff and Mr. Twiss, his new Secretary, is a dubious character. As usual, the broke Billy Bunter is writing home for a remittance - without success. About to break bounds by leaving the school late one evening Vernon-Smith wakens the whole school when he knocks Twiss down the stairs in the dark. Vernon-Smith’s punishment is a school flogging. Seething for revenge, Vernon-Smith is about to rag Dr. Locke's study when he is knocked unconscious in the dark by a mystery assailant at the study door. The next morning a large number of £10 notes are found to be missing from a drawer in the Head’s desk.

Coincidentally, Bunter has come into possession of a £10 banknote which he takes in and out of studies on the Remove to get changed without success. Bunter says the note is the long-expected remittance from home, but he is oddly reluctant to let Mrs. Mimble in the Tuck Shop change it. Then he claims he was given the note by a stranger. Is Bunter the midnight thief?
