= List of Greyfriars School characters =

This is a list of original characters found in the Greyfriars School stories by Charles Hamilton, writing as Frank Richards.

== Greyfriars Academic Staff ==
"Come in!" said the Head gently, as there was a tap at his door.

The door opened, to reveal the master of the Shell and the master of the Remove. Each stood aside with ceremonious and bitter politeness to allow the other to enter first. Each, finding that the other waited, decided at the same moment to enter first – with the natural result that there was a sudden jam in the doorway.

The Head promptly suppressed a smile. "Pray come in!" he said mildly.

— The Magnet No. 1086 (1928)
- Capper, Algernon Jasper – Fourth form Master. A more easy-going master than Mr. Quelch or Mr. Hacker. Appears in 297 stories; first appearance in Magnet No. 25 The Triumph Of The Remove (August 1, 1908).
- Charpentier, Monsieur Henri – French Master, known as "Mossoo". Originally from the French Loire region. Easy going and the subject of much leg-pulling by the Greyfriars juniors. Appears in 255 stories; first appearance in Magnet No. 57 The Ventriloquist's Pupils (March 13, 1909).
- Gans, Herr Otto – German Master. Originally from Saxony and emphasises that he is not a Prussian during the years of the Great War.
- Hacker, Horace Manfred – Upper Fourth (Shell) form Master. Unpopular, and a petty tyrant, known as 'The Acid Drop.' Appears in 176 stories; first appearance in Magnet No. 171 The Greyfriars Tyrant (May 20, 1911).
- Lascelles, Lawrence – Mathematics and Games Master. One of the most popular masters in the school; nicknamed "Larry" by the juniors. Appears in 149 stories; first appearance in Magnet No. 324 Harry Wharton's Diplomacy (April 25, 1914) where he is introduced as a young boxer named Larry the Lynx.
- Locke, The Rev Herbert Henry – The Headmaster, also the Sixth Form Master – majestic, kindly, scholarly, unworldly, and just. Appears in 970 stories; first appearance in Magnet No. 1 The Making Of Harry Wharton (February 15, 1908).
- Prout, Paul Pontifex – Fifth form Master. Known as "Old Pompous." Portly, inclined to long-winded reminiscences, but essentially good-hearted. Appears in 626 stories; first appearance in Magnet No. 38 The Cheerful Chinee (October 31, 1908).
- Quelch, Henry Samuel – Lower Fourth (Remove) form Master. Firm but fair, and described as "a Beast, but a just Beast." He stands no nonsense and does not spare the rod. A classical scholar who has spent many years working on "History of Greyfriars." Appears in 1,383 stories; first appearance in Magnet No. 1 The Making Of Harry Wharton (February 15, 1908).
- Twigg, Bernard Morrison - Second form Master. Appears in 108 stories; first appearance in Magnet No. 318 The Missing Chinee (March 14, 1914).
- Twigg, Eusebius – Third form Master and brother of Bernard Twigg, the Second form Master. Appears in 19 stories; first appearance in Magnet No. 201 The Duffer's Return (December 16, 1911). Final appearance in Magnet No. 927 The Whip Hand! (November 14, 1925) and afterwards replaced as Third Form master by Herbert Wiggins.
- Wiggins, Herbert – Third form Master. His chief hobby is photography. Appears in 89 stories; first appearance in Magnet No. 1010 Taking Up Trotter! (June 25, 1927).
- Woose, Mr. - first introduced as Quelch's replacement as Remove Master during the "Secret Seven" series of 1934; later he was Art Master and Librarian. Appears in 19 stories; first appearance in Magnet No. 1392 The Greyfriars Storm Troops! (October 20, 1934).

== Other Greyfriars staff ==
- Gosling, William – School porter. Detests all schoolboys, fond of gin and long past retirement age. Appears in 748 stories and first introduced in Magnet No. 11 Billy's Boom (April 25, 1908).
- Kebble, Mrs – Greyfriars Housekeeper and Head Cook. Appears in 142 stories and first introduced in Magnet No. 38 The Cheerful Chinee (October 31, 1908).
- Mimble, Alfred – Husband of Mrs Mimble and the school gardener. Appears in 58 stories and first introduced in Magnet No. 18 Roughing It! (June 13, 1908).
- Mimble, Mrs Jessie – Runs the school tuckshop. Appears in 565 stories and first introduced in Magnet No. 2 The Taming of Harry (February 22, 1908).
- Trotter, Frederick - School page. Appears in 456 stories and first introduced in Magnet No. 119 The Bounder of Greyfriars (May 21, 1910).

== Greyfriars School Sixth Form ==
Loder gritted his teeth.

"You've no right to question me, Wingate!" he muttered. "I'm a prefect, and- "

"And I am head-prefect, and responsible to the headmaster!" said Wingate icily. "Will you answer me?"

"No!" said Loder between his teeth.

"Very well, you will see Dr. Locke in the morning, and I've no doubt you will answer him!" said Wingate dryly. And he turned away to go back in his room.

"Hold on!" gasped Loder.

"Well?" Wingate spoke over his shoulder.

"You're going to report this to the Head?"

"I've got to."

"You could mind your own business!" said Loder bitterly.

"If I did not make this my business, Loder, I should resign my prefect-ship. Is that all you have to say?"

"No!" breathed Loder. "I-I've not been out if you want to know."

"You picked up that wet mud on your boots indoors?" asked Wingate with cool contempt.

— The Magnet No. 1390 (1934)
- Carberry, George Joseph – A bullying prefect, disliked by most other members of the school. Appears in 57 stories and first introduced in Magnet No. 118 The Remove’s Challenge (May 14, 1910). His final appearance was in Magnet 107 The Cad Of The Sixth (February 26, 1910 ), when he was expelled from the school.
- Carne, Arthur Woodhead – a Sixth form prefect. Along with Gerald Loder and James Walker, one of the bad set among the seniors. Appears in 303 stories and first introduced in Magnet No. 96 The Greyfriars Skaters (December 11, 1909)
- Coker, Reginald (Minor) – Younger brother of Horace Coker of the Fifth form. Unlike his brother, he is weakly but a good scholar. Often picked upon by bullies but stoutly championed by his brother. Lives with his family in his Aunt Judy's house – Coker Place – in Surrey. Appears in 16 stories and first introduced in Magnet No. 241 – Coker Minor – Sixth Former! (September 21, 1912).
- Courtney, Arthur Evans – a popular senior, straight and generous, and a fine sportsman. Appears in 150 stories and first introduced in Magnet No. 108 Wingate’s Secret (March 5, 1910). His final appearance was in Magnet No. 520 A Very Gallant Gentleman! (January 26, 1918), when he lost his life rescuing Rupert Valence after the Cross Keys Inn was struck by a German incendiary bomb. Valence left the school soon afterwards. This story, authored by substitute writer John Nix Pentelow, attracted sharp criticism from reviewers, who noted the Sixth form characterisation gap caused by the loss of two well-drawn characters that would never be replaced. In fairness to Pentelow, it later emerged that he wrote this story on instruction from higher authority, as there was evidence that some readers were confusing Courtney with Highcliffe Junior Captain Frank Courtenay, and it was decided one of them had to go.
- Faulkner, Lawrence – A prefect and a friend of Wingate. He is a close friend of Tremaine – both are from the West Country. Appears in 28 stories and first introduced in Magnet No. 520 A Very Gallant Gentleman! (January 26, 1918).
- Gwynne, Patrick – A prefect and Wingate's closest friend. Gwynne is a sunny-tempered Irishman and is widely liked in the school. Appears in 327 stories and first introduced in Magnet No. 463 Foul Play! (December 23, 1916).
- Hammersley, Vincent – A tall strapping prefect and an all-round sportsman. Appears in 11 stories and first introduced in Magnet No. 520 A Very Gallant Gentleman! (January 26, 1918).
- Ionides, Heracles – Sixth form senior. Son of a wealthy Greek merchant. A dandy and a bully who was appointed a prefect and then deposed by the Headmaster, all within a few days of his arrival. He later becomes close to Loder and his friends. Appears in 53 stories and first introduced in Magnet No. 49 The New Sixth Former (January 16, 1909). Later fades from the stories without explanation.
- Loder, Gerald Assheton – a Sixth form senior and Prefect. Loder is a malicious bully who hates Wharton & Co and who gives free rein to his malice when undertaking his duties as a Prefect. Appears in 686 stories and is first introduced in Magnet No. 66 Stoney Broke (May 15, 1909), not yet a prefect. Loder became a Prefect in Magnet No. 107 The Cad of the Sixth (February 26, 1910), following Carberry's expulsion.
- North, Tom – an easy-going prefect who is widely liked for his good nature. Plays in goal for the senior soccer team. Appears in 100 stories and first introduced in Magnet No. 52 The Hero Of Greyfriars (February 6, 1909).
- Sykes - A popular Sixth form Prefect. A regular member of the senior soccer and cricket teams and a good friend of Wingate. Appears in 79 stories and first introduced in Magnet No. 1154 The Fool Of The Fifth! (March 29, 1930)
- Tremaine, Charles - Sixth form schoolboy and Prefect. A close friend of Faulkner. Appears in 2 stories and first introduced in Magnet No. 656 In Borrowed Plumes! (September 4, 1920).
- Valence, Rupert Wingfield - Sixth from schoolboy and a thoroughly bad character. Appears in 52 stories and first introduced in Magnet No. 186 The Only Way! (September 2, 1911). His final appearance was in Magnet No. 520 A Very Gallant Gentleman! (January 26, 1918), when fellow Sixth former Arthur Courtney lost his life rescuing Valence from the bombed wreckage of the Cross Keys Inn. As Valence had broken into the inn with criminal intent, he left the school before his inevitable expulsion.
- Walker, James – a prefect who associates with Loder and Carne. Has been known to display a better side to his nature when not under the influence of the other two. Appears in 339 stories and first introduced in Magnet No. 112 The ‘First’ At Greyfriars (April 2, 1910)
- Wingate, George Bernard – Captain of Greyfriars School; Head Prefect; Head of Games. A well-liked sporting hero, and the embodiment of decency. Maintains discipline, but is the most popular fellow in the school. Has a younger brother, Jack Wingate, in the Third form. Lives in Chester. Appears in 1,112 stories and first introduced in Magnet No. 1 The Making Of Harry Wharton (February 15, 1908)

== Greyfriars School Fifth Form ==
"How many K's in exasperating?" asked Horace Coker.

Potter and Greene of the Fifth smiled.

Coker's aunt, Miss Judith Coker, had an idea that it was up to Coker of the Fifth to help his young cousin in the Remove with his lessons!

Probably, had Coker's Aunt Judy heard that question, she would have changed her ideas on the subject!

"None, old chap," said Potter gently.

"Don't be an ass, Potter!" said Coker crossly. "Do you know, Greeney? Are there one or two - single or double?"

"I wouldn't put any," said Greene, shaking his head.

"Don't be a fathead, Greene!"

— The Magnet No. 1405 (1935)
- Bland, Bertram – schoolboy in the Fifth form who shares Study No 1 with Blundell, his closest friend since their time in the Third form. A good sportsman. Appears in 116 stories and first introduced in Magnet No. 43 The Greyfriars Victory (December 5, 1908).
- Blundell, George (Study No 1) – Captain and Head Boy of the Fifth form. An energetic fellow with sound principles. A fine sportsman who is usually picked for the senior soccer and cricket teams. Appears in 295 stories and first introduced in Magnet No. 35 Harry Wharton's Scheme. (October 10, 1908).
- Coker, Horace James (Study No 4)– big, strong and overbearing; and one of the major characters of the stories. Convinced of his intellectual superiority and sporting prowess, an opinion that is strangely shared by nobody except his adoring Aunt Judy, who keeps him well supplied with cash and food hampers. Coker was originally one of the oldest students in the Shell, having not been promoted to the Fifth Form because of his intellectual limitations, but Aunt Judy browbeat the Head into promoting him anyway. Appears in 882 stories and first introduced in Magnet No. 143 The Head of Study 14 (5 Nov, 1910).
- Fitzgerald, Terence – a good humoured Irishman, who shares Study No. 2 with Smith Major. Appears in 134 stories and first introduced in Magnet No. 223 Frank Nugent's Great Wheeze! (May 18, 1912).
- Greene, William Frederick – Fifth form schoolboy and, along with his friend George Potter, sidekick of Coker, with whom they share Study No. 4. Potter and Green tolerate Coker's buffoonery in exchange for Coker's lavish hospitality. As we are sometimes reminded by the author: Coker stood the tea, so Potter and Greene stood Coker. Appears in 524 stories and first introduced in Magnet No. 199 The Downfall Of The Fifth (December 2, 1911).
- Hilton, Cedric – a wealthy and elegant member of the Fifth. Lives with his family at Hilton Hall in Devon. Shares Study No. 6 with Price, a shady character who often leads him into bad habits. Appears in 144 stories and first introduced in Magnet No. 529 The Fighting Fifth! (March 30, 1918).
- Potter, George (Study No 4)– sidekick of Coker, A useful member of the senior soccer and cricket teams. Often to be found refereeing junior soccer games. Appears in 579 stories and first introduced in Magnet No. 145 Coker's Catch (November 19, 1910).
- Price, Stephen – A weak character who dislikes sports and associates with the racing fraternity at the local inns. Appears in 123 stories and first introduced in Magnet No. 529 The Fighting Fifth! (March 30, 1918).
- Smith (Major), Edward William - Appears in 35 stories and first introduced in Magnet No. 54 Billy Bunter's House Warming (February 20, 1909).
- Tomlinson (Major), Thomas Trotter - Fifth form schoolboy. Appears in 38 stories and first introduced in Magnet No. 374 The Fall Of The Fifth! (April 10, 1915).

== Greyfriars School Shell (Upper Fourth) Form ==
- Carr, Albert
- Chowne, Cholmondeley
- Churchill, Luke
- Hobson, James – Captain of the Form.
- Hoskins, Claude – Hoskins is tone deaf but in his own estimation, he is a musical genius.
- Jackson, Philbert
- Kenney, Philip
- Lange, Arnold Lawrence
- Miles, Samuel
- Stewart, Edward

== Greyfriars School Fourth Form ==
- Angel, Aubrey – a dandy, and the 'bad hat' of the Fourth. Owns a powerful motorcycle.
- Dabney, William Walter – one of Temple's two close associates. Possesses more common sense than his chief, though lacks the initiative to restrain Temple as aften as he might. Has limited conversation: tends to respond "Oh, rather!" to every remark addressed to him.
- Doone, Percy (Minor) – younger brother of Doone of the Sixth.
- Fitzgerald, Patrick – younger cousin of Fitzgerald of the Fifth.
- Fry, Edward – with Dabney, one of Temple's two close associates. Inclined to be a dandy but is a stronger character than either of the other two.
- Kennedy, Paul
- MacDougall, Ronald
- Murphy, Shamus
- Phipps, Charles
- Scott, James Kenneth
- Temple, Cecil Reginald – Form Captain. An effete dandy. Continually deludes himself that the Fourth's prowess at Soccer compares to that of the Remove, despite the Fourth being almost invariably defeated by the younger Form. Despite his dandified ways, he is nonetheless a handy fighting man if it comes to a punch-up.
- Tomlinson, Teddy Edwin (Minor)
- Turner, Maurice

== Greyfriars School Remove (Lower Fourth) Form ==
The Remove is the home of the main protagonists in the stories, including the Famous Five, Billy Bunter, and Herbert Vernon-Smith. It is frequently described in the stories as a "numerous" form, and with good reason: over the 53-year period of publication, it is estimated that more than 80 schoolboys passed through the form. Most of these arrived as a central character in a particular storyline, and disappeared shortly afterwards, having either been expelled or simply not mentioned again.

The following list of members of the Remove is that published in The Magnet No. 1,659, and organised by the studies to which they are assigned. Of the 39 characters in the list, it is noteworthy that it took the author 559 weeks to assemble 38 of them.

=== Study No. 1 ===
- Nugent, Frank – Wharton's closest friend and a member of the Famous Five. One of six members of the Remove who were already at Greyfriars in the first story and remained to the last – the others being Bunter, Bulstrode, Hazeldene, Skinner and Russell. Self-effacing and protective of his troublesome younger brother Richard, in the Greyfriars Second Form. Along with Wharton, is one of two characters to appear in all of the 1,683 stories and first introduced in Magnet No. 1 The Making of Harry Wharton (February 15, 1908).
- Wharton, Harry – Originally intended to be the main protagonist of the stories. He and his friends Nugent, Cherry, Hurree Singh and Bull are known as the Famous Five. A natural leader who takes his duties as Head Boy of the Remove and Form Captain very seriously. Strong willed, stubborn almost to the point of arrogance and quick to take offence, particularly if his word is doubted. Along with Nugent, is one of two characters to appear in all of the 1,683 stories and first introduced in Magnet No. 1 The Making of Harry Wharton (February 15, 1908).

=== Study No. 2 ===
- Brown, Tom – a New Zealand junior from Taranaki in the North Island. A rugby player when he arrived at the school but quickly adapted to football. Enjoys tinkering with his radio. Appears in 751 stories and first introduced in Magnet No. 86 The Chum from New Zealand (1909).
- Bulstrode, George – the original Captain of the Remove. Tall and strong for his age and originally an unpleasant bully who could not forgive Wharton for taking his place as captain. His character changed after the death of his younger brother Herbert (Magnet No. 178 – 1911). Rarely mentioned after 1930. Appears in 534 stories and first introduced in Magnet No. 1 The Making of Harry Wharton (February 15, 1908).
- Hazeldene, Peter – weak and vacillating, earning him the early nickname of "Vaseline". Later known simply as "Hazel". His sister is schoolgirl Marjorie Hazeldene, whose popularity among many Greyfriars boys leads them to show more patience towards her brother than he perhaps deserves. Appears in 834 stories and first introduced in Magnet No. 2 The Taming of Harry (February 22, 1908).

=== Study No. 3 ===
- Ogilvy, Robert Donald – Scottish junior from the mountains of Inverness. Not a first rate scholar, though plods along steadily. A good sportsman, especially at soccer, which suits him better than cricket, and a talented boxer. Appears in 667 stories and first introduced in Magnet No. 43 The Greyfriars Victory (December 5, 1908).
- Russell, Richard – rarely to the fore but, along with his study mate Ogilvy, a strong supporter of Wharton's relative and rival Ralph Stacey in the highly rated Stacey series of 1934. Enjoys boxing. Appears in 562 stories and first introduced in Magnet No. 1 The Making of Harry Wharton (February 15, 1908).

=== Study No. 4 ===
- Redwing, Tom – A scholarship boy and the son of a local sailor. Forms a close friendship with Vernon-Smith that is frequently tested by the latter's tendency to blackguardism. Appears in 553 stories and introduced in Magnet No. 516 Looking After Inky! (December 29, 1917)
- Vernon-Smith, Herbert Tudor – a charismatic but reckless and quick-tempered character who features prominently in the stories. A natural leader, both on and off the sports field, but with a hard and selfish streak. Has too much money, thanks to the indulgence of his millionaire father, which allows him to follow a rebellious lifestyle that has earned him the nickname "The Bounder". Much improved by his friendship with Tom Redwing who was introduced in 1918. Appears in 1,279 stories and first introduced in Magnet No. 119 The Bounder of Greyfriars (May 21, 1910).

=== Study No. 5 ===
- Hillary, Richard – his introduction in a two-part storyline examined the issue of conscientious objectors in the First World War. Hillary not only opposed the war but was allowed to advance calm and reasoned arguments for the anti-war case. Eventually he changed his views (which probably allowed the story into publication but not before allowing himself to be tormented by some of his schoolfellows, notably Bunter, Skinner and Bolsover. Appears in 16 stories and first introduced in Magnet No. 559 A Case of Conscience (October 26, 1918)
- Kipps, Oliver – A talented conjurer and practical joker, which has earned him some knocks when combining the two. Appears in 119 stories and first Introduced in Magnet No. 268 The Schoolboy Conjurer (March 29, 1913).

=== Study No. 6 ===
- Desmond, Michael Patrick Shamus (Mickey) – Irish junior. Introduced in Magnet No. 15 Wharton's Operatic Company (1908). Good natured and friendly with the Welsh junior David Morgan, with whom he shares study no 6. Appears in 491 stories and first Introduced in Magnet No. 15 Wharton's Operatic Company (May 23, 1908).
- Morgan, David – Welsh junior from Caernarvon. Appears in 255 stories and first introduced in Magnet No. 8 In Hiding (April 4, 1908).
- Rake, Richard – introduced in Magnet No. 258 Rake of the Remove (1913). Appears in 149 stories and first introduced in Magnet No. 258 Rake Of The Remove (January 18, 1913).
- Wibley, William Ernest (Study No 6) – a talented actor and impersonator, which frequently leads him into trouble. ". Founder, president and lead actor of the Remove Dramatic Society. Appears in 341 stories and first introduced in Magnet No. 322 Wibley's Wheeze (April 11, 1914)

=== Study No. 7 ===
- Bunter, William George - known as Billy Bunter, is the best known character in the stories. He was initially conceived as a minor character, but developed into one of the principal characters of the stories as his comic potential was realised. His big round spectacles and rolling gait earned him the nickname the "'Owl of the Remove'". Foolish, greedy, deceitful, comically conceited, but essentially harmless. Among his few virtues are an occasional tendency to display courage for the sake of others (invariably while being terrified himself); a genuine love and concern for his mother; and, oddly enough, generosity, on the rare occasions when he is in possession of food or cash. Appears in 1,670 stories and introduced in Magnet No. 1 The Making of Harry Wharton (February 15, 1908).
- Dutton, Tom – has severely impaired hearing and consequently misunderstands everything said to him. A good boxer and skater, both roller and ice, and would be a good sportsman but for his poor hearing. Appears in 397 stories and first introduced in Magnet No. 128 Wun Lung's Loss (July 23, 1910).
- Todd, Alonzo Theophilus – Cousin of Peter Todd, with whom he shares a close physical resemblance. Honest and simple, but gullible, believing anything he is told, leaving him open to practical jokes. Fond of quoting his Uncle Benjamin who told him to always be helpful. Appears in 258 stories and first introduced in Magnet No. 125 The Duffer of Greyfriars (July 2, 1910).
- Todd, Peter Hastings – self appointed leader of Study No 7 and devotes much of his time to improving Bunter: a futile, fruitless and frustrating occupation. He is the son of a Bloomsbury solicitor with ambitions to follow in his father's footsteps. Appears in 1039 stories and first introduced in Magnet No. 204 The Duffer's Double (January 6, 1912).

=== Study No. 8 ===
- Smith (Minor), Robert Fortescue – appears in 40 stories and introduced in Magnet No. 27 The Reformation of Greyfriars (August 15, 1908). He was quietly dropped from a prominent role to avoid confusion with Vernon Smith, but continued to be mentioned until Magnet No. 1493 His Convict Cousin! (September 26, 1936)
- Elliot, Ninian - Appears in 64 stories and first introduced in Magnet No. 41 The Rival Entertainers (November 21, 1908).

=== Study No. 9 ===
- Newland, Montague – Jewish junior from Hove in Sussex. A close friend of his study mate Dick Penfold. Appears in 186 stories and first introduced in Magnet No. 216 The Schoolboy Outcast (March 30, 1912)
- Penfold, Richard (Study No 9) –Scholarship boy and the son of a Friardale cobbler. One of three Remove juniors from a working-class background (the others being Linley and Redwing), all of whom are portrayed as being of exemplary character. Penfold is a keen writer of verse, much of which was featured in the Magnet in a regular feature column titled The Greyfriars Rhymester. Appears in 186 stories and first introduced in Magnet No. 194 By Sheer Grit! (October 28, 1911)
- Treluce, Anthony - a Cornish boy. Appears in 84 stories and first introduced in Magnet No. 100 Nugent Minor (1909)
- Trevor, Herbert Beauchamp - Appears in 191 stories and first introduced in Magnet No. 2 The Taming Of Harry (February 22, 1908)

=== Study No. 10 ===
- Bolsover, Percy (Major) – originally introduced as an unpleasant bully, though has calmed over time. Now shares a study with French junior Napoleon Dupont, his one true friend, whom he protects from bullying. Appears in 856 stories and first introduced in Magnet No. 182 The Cock of the Walk (August 5, 1911).
- Dupont, Napoleon – French junior who shares a study with Bolsover. After many early arguments, the two have settled down and Bolsover is now very protective of his French chum. Appears in 47 stories and first introduced in Magnet No. 540 Napoleon Of Greyfriars! (June 15, 1918).

=== Study No. 11 ===
- Skinner, Harold – One of the most unpleasant characters at Greyfriars – cowardly, malicious and with unwholesome vices such as smoking and gambling. The perpetrator of cruelly accurate cartoons and malicious practical jokes. Appears in 1,232 stories and first introduced in Magnet No. 1 The Making of Harry Wharton (February 15, 1908).
- Snoop, Sidney – a weak character, very much under Skinner's unhealthy influence. Appears in 887 stories and first introduced in Magnet No. 45 A Lad from Lancashire (December 19, 1908).
- Stott, William – associate of Skinner, though very occasionally shows a little moral strength and independence. Appears in 559 stories and first introduced in Magnet No. 35 Harry Wharton's Scheme (October 10, 1908).

=== Study No. 12 ===
- Delarey, Piet – South African junior, nicknamed "The Rebel." Appears in 101 stories and first introduced in Magnet No. 432 The Boy from South Africa (May 20, 1916). This story was written by a Magnet substitute writer – John Nix Pentelow – and unusually, the character of Delarey is subsequently retained by Hamilton, though never in a prominent role.
- Mauleverer, Herbert Plantaganet (The Earl of Mauleverer) – outwardly, a languid aristocratic millionaire with a sleepy demeanour. But there are hidden depths to "Mauly" – his keen judge of human character and simple faith in human nature have led him more than once to show loyalty to friends in adverse circumstances. On such occasions he reveals an astute mind and considerable leadership qualities, along with a talent for boxing that is a match for anyone in the form. Appears in 922 stories and first introduced in Magnet No. 184 The Schoolboy Millionaire (August 19, 1911).
- Vivian, Sir James (Jimmy) – Schoolboy Baronet and Mauleverer's cousin. Introduced in Magnet No. 471 Sir Jimmy at Greyfriars (1917). Spent much of his early life on the poverty stricken streets of London. Retains the speech of the London slums but acts like a nobleman. Appears in 115 stories and first introduced in Magnet No. 471 Sir Jimmy Of Greyfriars! (February 17, 1917).

=== Study No. 13 ===
- Cherry, Robert – Cheerful, energetic and robust. In person, ruddy-cheeked and flaxen haired. Loud and exuberant, his cheery greeting "Hallo, hallo, hallo!" has become part of everyday Remove life. Lives with his father Major Cherry, a retired Army officer and governor of Greyfriars School, at the family home in Dorset. A member of the Famous Five. Appears in 1,682 stories and first introduced in Magnet No. 2 The Taming of Harry (February 22, 1908).
- Singh, Hurree Jamset Ram – Indian Prince. Nabob of the fictional state of Bhanipur, where he was taught a peculiarly idiomatic version of English. Known affectionately as "Inky" to his friends. A fine cricketer and the best bowler in the Remove, with a sharp mind and an extremely perceptive judge of human nature. A skilled exponent of chess. A member of the Famous Five. Appears in 1,619 stories and first introduced in Magnet No. 6 Aliens at Greyfriars (21 March 1908).
- Linley, Mark – a former factory hand from Lancashire who joined Greyfriars School as a scholarship boy. Established himself as the leading academic in the form and a fine sportsman. Quiet-natured, loyal and the only pupil in the Remove with a genuine interest in learning Greek. Appeared in 774 stories and first introduced in Magnet No. 45 A lad from Lancashire (December 19, 1908).
- Wun Lung – Chinese junior. Wears his hair in a long pigtail and speaks a very peculiar idiomatic version of English. Likes to play tricks and sees nothing wrong with lying to friends when it suits him. But he has a keen intellect when he wants to use it and has occasionally noticed things that proved invaluable to Wharton, Bulstrode, Cherry, and Linley. Wun Lung is the only member of the Remove who can beat Hurree Singh at chess. He has a younger brother, Hop Hi, in the Second form. Appears in 345 stories and first introduced in Magnet No. 36 The New Boy at Greyfriars (October 17, 1908).

=== Study No. 14 ===
- Bull, Johnny – a plain-speaking Yorkshireman and the final member of the Famous Five to arrive at Greyfriars. His blunt and direct manner occasionally causes friction with his friends. Appears in 1,513 stories and first introduced in Magnet No. 151 The Girls' School's Challenge (December 31, 1910).
- Field, Sampson Quincy Iffley – smart Australian junior from New South Wales. Known to all as "Squiff," after his initials. A fine sportsman – the first choice goalkeeper in the Remove football team and, along with Hurree Singh, one of the main bowlers in the cricket team. Appears in 745 stories and first introduced in Magnet No. 343 A Cool Card! (September 5, 1914).
- Fish, Fisher Tarleton – avaricious and bony American junior. Known as "Fishy," he is a rampant capitalist, who makes the most of his limited opportunities for free enterprise at Greyfriars, with schemes, usually moneylending, that have a tendency to unravel. Appears in 760 stories and first introduced in Magnet No. 150 The Yankee Schoolboy ( December 24, 1910).

== Greyfriars School Third Form ==
- Bolsover, Hubert (Minor)
- Bolter, Oliver
- Conrad, Leonard
- Lunn, Harold
- Paget, Percival Spencer
- Simpson, John
- Smith, Henry
- Tubb, George – Form Captain (Horace Tubb in #206)
- Wingate, Jack (Minor)

== Greyfriars School Second Form ==
- Bunter (Minor), Samuel Tuckless (Sammy) – younger brother of Billy Bunter. Sammy shares many of his elder brother's characteristics, including his waistline. Lives with his family at Bunter Villa, Reigate, Surrey. Appears in 291 stories; first mentioned in Magnet No. 143 The Head of Study 14 (November 5, 1910) and introduced in the following edition, Magnet No. 144 Billy Bunter's Minor (November 12, 1910).
- Castle, Thomas - appears in 5 stories and first introduced in Magnet No. 545 The Shylock Of The Second! (July 20, 1918).
- Gatty, George Adalbert - one of the leaders of the Second form. Appears in 155 stories and first introduced in Magnet No. 100 Nugent Minor (January 8, 1910).
- Marsden, Eric - appears in 4 stories and first introduced in Magnet No. 545 The Shylock Of The Second! (July 20, 1918).
- Myers, Edwin – friend of Gatty. Appears in 113 stories and first introduced in Magnet No. 100 Nugent Minor (January 8, 1910).
- Nugent (Minor), Richard – known as Dicky Nugent. Troublesome and impertinent younger brother of Frank Nugent of the Remove. Originally considered an "outsider", he eventually settled in and became leader of the form, with his friends Gatty and Myers. Appears in 291 stories and first introduced in Magnet No. 100 Nugent Minor (January 8, 1910)
- Pettifer, James - appears in 5 stories and first introduced in Magnet No. 545 The Shylock Of The Second! (July 20, 1918).
- Spring, Herbert - appears in 6 stories and first introduced in Magnet No. 545 The Shylock Of The Second! (July 20, 1918).
- Sylvester, Roderick - son of an American multi-millionaire. Appears in 10 stories and first introduced in Magnet No. 345 Spirited Away! (September 19, 1914).
- Todd, Ernest - appears in 4 stories and first introduced in Magnet No. 100 Nugent Minor (January 8, 1910).
- Wun Hop Hi – Chinese junior and younger brother of Wun Lung of the Remove. Appears in 34 stories and first introduced in Magnet No. 117 Wun Lung Minor (May 7, 1910).

== Greyfriars School First Form ==
There are few mentions of a First form at Greyfriars and none at all after the early era of The Magnet.

== Cliff House School ==
"Bessie!"

"Oh!"

"Keep that basket shut!"

"I'm only counting the tarts!" said Bessie Bunter, with a great deal of dignity.

"Well," said Miss Clara Trevlyn, "don't! The more often you count them, the less there will be to count."

"If you think I was eating a tart behind this sunshade, Clara - "

"I believe you'd eat the sunshade, if there wasn't anything else to eat!"

"Cat!"

— The Magnet No. 1528 (1937)
- Bellew, Miss - school mistress at Cliff House School. Appeared in 10 stories; first appearance in Magnet No. 795 (May 5, 1923).
- Bullivant, Miss Amelia - school mistress at Cliff House School. Appeared in 16 stories; first appearance in Magnet No. 1415 (March 30, 1935).
- Bunter, Elizabeth Gertrude (Bessie Bunter) - schoolgirl in the Fourth Form at Cliff House School and sister of Billy Bunter of the Greyfriars Remove. Appeared in 116 stories; first appearance in Magnet No. 572 (January 25, 1919).
- Hazeldene, Marjorie – schoolgirl in the Fourth Form at Cliff House School and sister of Peter Hazeldene of the Greyfriars Remove. A close friend of Clara Trevlyn. Appeared in 353 stories; first appearance in Magnet No. 5 (March 14, 1908).
- Howell, Phyllis - schoolgirl in the Fourth Form at Cliff House School and sister of Archie Howell of the Greyfriars Remove. Appeared in 49 stories; first appearance in Magnet No. 414 Bob Cherry's Challenge! (January 15, 1916).
- Jobling, Dolly - schoolgirl in the Fourth Form at Cliff House School. Appeared in 6 stories; first appearance in Magnet No. 575 (February 15, 1919).
- Limburger, Fraulein Wilhelmina - schoolgirl at Cliff House School. Appeared in 25 stories; first appearance in Magnet No. 48 (March 27, 1909).
- Locke, Miss Herpatia - Appeared in 24 stories; first appearance in Magnet No. 28 (August 22, 1908).
- Lynn, Mabel - schoolgirl in the Fourth Form at Cliff House School. Appeared in 17 stories; first appearance in Magnet No. 575 (February 15, 1919).
- Primrose, Miss Penelope - Headmistress of Cliff House School. Appeared in 99 stories; first appearance in Magnet No. 58 (March 20, 1909).
- Redfern, Barbara - schoolgirl in the Fourth Form at Cliff House School. Appeared in 24 stories; first appearance in Magnet No. 575 (February 15, 1919).
- Travers, Clara - schoolgirl at Cliff House School. Appeared in 7 stories; first appearance in Magnet No. 59 (March 27, 1909).
- Trevlyn, Clara - schoolgirl in the Fourth Form at Cliff House School. Appeared in 217 stories; first appearance in Magnet No. 69 (June 5, 1909).
- Williams, Grace - schoolgirl at Cliff House School. Appeared in 3 stories; first appearance in Magnet No. 146 (November 26, 1910).

== Highcliffe School ==
"So that's the game, is it?" muttered Gadsby.

"That's it!" said Pon. "If that leads to trouble between Cliff House and Greyfriars, it's about the hardest knock we could give those cads!"

Gadsby breathed hard.

"I dare say!" he said. "It's the sort of thing you would think of, Pon. I'm not standing for it!"

"Nor I!" said Monson slowly. "It's too thick, Pon! I don't care so far as the Greyfriars cads are concerned, but I'm not goin' to have a hand in raggin' girls. There's a limit!"

"You can please yourselves - but you won't barge in!" said Ponsonby, with a glitter in his eyes. "Steer clear, if you like. The girls won't come to any harm- they'll get a fright, but we shall take them off later, in time to get them back to their school. As soon as they've got it into their heads that it was Bob Cherry who stranded them, that's all I want."

"I'm havin' no hand in it!"

"Same here!"

— The Magnet No. 1528 (1937)
- Benson, Percy Charmers - Fourth form schoolboy at Highcliffe. Appears in 15 stories; first appearance in Magnet No. 344 The Remove Rugger Team! (February 4, 1922).
- Blades, Benjamin Armdale - Fourth form schoolboy at Highcliffe. Appears in 4 stories; first appearance in Magnet No. 531 Tom Redwing - Hero! (April 13, 1918).
- Courtenay, Frank - schoolboy and Fourth form junior captain at Highcliffe School. Fourth form loyalties at the school are sharply divided between Courtenay's supporters and those still loyal to Ponsonby, the former captain. Appears in 179 stories; first appearance in Magnet No. 374 The Fall Of The Fifth! (April 10, 1915).
- De Courcy, Rupert Fitzroy - schoolboy in the Fourth Form at Highcliffe School. Known as "The Caterpillar" because of his laziness. Formerly a member of Ponsonby's gang, he changed his ways due to Courtenay's influence. Appears in 151 stories; first appearance in Magnet No. 374 The Fall Of The Fifth! (April 10, 1915).
- Derwent, Philip - schoolboy in the Fourth Form at Highcliffe School. Appears in 18 stories; first appearance in Magnet No. 515 Flap's Brother!(December 22, 1917).
- Drury, Edwin Ethelbert - Fourth form schoolboy at Highcliffe. One of Ponsonby's gang. Appears in 60 stories; first appearance in Magnet No. 344 Ructions At Highcliffe! (September 12, 1914).
- Gadsby, Reginald Havers – schoolboy in the Fourth Form at Highcliffe School. Ponsonby's closest ally. Appears in 237 stories; first appearance in Magnet No. 138 Harry Wharton's 'Pro' (October 1, 1910).
- Langley, Arthur De Bohun - Highcliffe Sixth form member who is Head Boy and School Captain. Appears in 20 stories; first appearance in Magnet No. 374 The Fall Of The Fifth!(April 10, 1915).
- Merton, John Arthur - schoolboy in the Fourth Form at Highcliffe School. Appears in 53 stories; first appearance in Magnet No. 138 Harry Wharton's 'Pro' (October 1, 1910).
- Mobbs, Mr. Albert Hicks - Fourth form Master at Highcliffe School. A social snob who makes favourites of those with aristocratic connections. He is particularly well disposed towards Ponsonby and his friends. Appears in 78 stories; first appearance in Magnet No. 255 Harry Wharton's Win!(December 28, 1912).
- Monson, Richard Middleton - schoolboy in the Fourth Form at Highcliffe School. A member of Ponsonby's gang, though not the worst of them. Appears in 193 stories; first appearance in Magnet No. 168 Last Man In!(April 29, 1911).
- Ponsonby, The Honourable Cecil – schoolboy and former junior captain in the Fourth Form at Highcliffe School. Cousin of Frank Courtenay, who succeeded him as junior captain. Utterly unscrupulous and loses no opportunity to score over his bitter rivals at Greyfriars. His behaviour sometimes borders on criminality, notably issues 938 to 940 (1926) where Ponsonby after some really nasty behaviour, is expelled in disgrace, but Hamilton brings him back. He appeared in 339 stories; first appearance in Magnet No. 138 Harry Wharton's 'Pro' (October 1, 1910).
- Smithson, George - schoolboy in the Fourth Form at Highcliffe School and a friend of Courtenay. Appears in 38 stories; first appearance in Magnet No. 344 Ructions At Highcliffe! (September 12, 1914).
- Tunstall, Frederick Guest- schoolboy in the Fourth Form at Highcliffe School and a fringe member of Ponsonby's gang. Appears in 17 stories; first appearance in Magnet No. 138 Harry Wharton's 'Pro' (October 1, 1910).
- Vavasour, Aldophus Theodore - schoolboy in the Fourth Form at Highcliffe School. A staunch member of Ponsonby's gang. Appears in 171 stories; first appearance in Magnet No. 109 The Remove To The Rescue (March 12, 1910).
- Voysey, The Reverend Patrick Rhodes - Headmaster of Highcliffe School. An elderly and weak man, under whom Highcliffe School standards have drifted badly. First appearance in Magnet No. 255 (December 28, 1912). Appeared in 49 stories; first appearance in Magnet No. 255 Harry Wharton's Win! (December 28, 1912).
- Yates, James Edward - schoolboy in the Fourth Form at Highcliffe School and a friend of Courtenay. Appears in 21 stories; first appearance in Magnet No. 393 Ponsonby's Plot! (August 21, 1915).

== St Jim's School ==
St. Jim's School was created by Charles Hamilton in 1907 for stories featured in The Gem, with the author writing as Martin Clifford. The first Gem stories therefore appeared before The Magnet was first published; but the appearances and first introductions below are those for the Greyfriars stories in The Magnet. The leading characters at St. Jim's occasionally appeared in Greyfriars stories, for example in episodes involving sporting fixtures or holiday travel stories.

- Blake, Jack - schoolboy in the Fourth form at St. Jim's. Appears in 43 stories and first introduced in Magnet No. 39 Greyfriars Versus St. Jim's (November 7, 1908)
- D'Arcy, Arthur Augustus - schoolboy in the Fourth form at St. Jim's. The second son of Lord Eastwood, he has polished manners, is impeccably dressed, has a highly developed sense of dignity and a scrupulous sense of humour. Kind, compassionate, but sadly lacking in intellect, he fills the comedic role at St. Jim's that Bunter provides at Greyfriars. Appears in 111 stories and first introduced in Magnet No. 39 Greyfriars Versus St. Jim's (November 7, 1908)
- Darrel, George - schoolboy in the Sixth form at St. Jim's. Appears in 10 stories and first introduced in Magnet No. 297 Game To The Last! (October 18, 1913)
- Digby, Robert Arthur - schoolboy in the Fourth form at St. Jim's. Appears in 15 stories and first introduced in Magnet No. 39 Greyfriars Versus St. Jim's (November 7, 1908)
- Figgins, George - schoolboy in the Fourth form at St. Jim's. Appears in 40 stories and first introduced in Magnet No. 33 Aliens Against Greyfriars (September 26, 1908)
- Kerr, George Francis - schoolboy in the Fourth form at St. Jim's. Appears in 25 stories and first introduced in Magnet No. 39 Greyfriars Versus St. Jim's (November 7, 1908)
- Holmes, Dr.Richard - Headmaster of St. Jim's. Appears in 15 stories and first introduced in Magnet No. 103 The Greyfriars Athletes (January 29, 1910)
- Kildare, Eric - School Captain and Prefect in the Sixth form at St. Jim's. Appears in 26 stories and first introduced in Magnet No. 64 Wharton & Co Versus Merry & Co (May 1, 1909)
- Levison, Ernest - schoolboy, formerly at Greyfriars from where he was expelled for disreputable behaviour. Joined St. Jim's where he reformed his character, eventually becoming a member of sports teams and a good friend of the Famous Five. Appears in 58 stories and first introduced in Magnet No. 18 Roughing It! (June 13, 1908)
- Levison, Francis (Frank) - schoolboy in the Third form at St. Jim's. The younger brother of Ernest Levison. Has spent some time in the Greyfriars Third Form. Appears in 14 stories and first introduced in Magnet No. 510 An Old Boy At Greyfriars! (November 17, 1917)
- Lowther, Montague - schoolboy in the Upper Fourth (Shell) form at St. Jim's. Appears in 32 stories and first introduced in Magnet No. 39 Greyfriars Versus St. Jim's (November 7, 1908)
- Merry, Thomas (Tom) - schoolboy in the Upper Fourth (Shell) form at St. Jim's. The Junior Captain at St. Jim's and a good friend of the Greyfriars Famous Five. Appears in 100 stories and first introduced in Magnet No. 39 Greyfriars Versus St. Jim's (November 7, 1908)
- Noble, Harry - schoolboy in the Upper Fourth (Shell) form at St. Jim's. Australian, and a fine sportsman. Appears in 16 stories and first introduced in Magnet No. xxx Harry Wharton's Eleven (August 14, 1909)
- Redfern, Richard Henry - schoolboy in the Fourth form at St. Jim's. Appears in 14 stories and first introduced in Magnet No. 273 'Friars Versus Saints! (May 3, 1913)
- Skimpole, Herbert - schoolboy in the Upper Fourth (Shell) form at St. Jim's. Appears in 4 stories and first introduced in Magnet No. 64 Wharton & Co Versus Merry & Co (May 1, 1909)
- Talbot, Reginald - schoolboy in the Upper Fourth (Shell) form at St. Jim's. Appears in 24 stories and first introduced in Magnet No. 374 The Fall Of The Fifth! (April 10, 1915)
- Wynn, Edgar Llewellyn - known as "Fatty Wynn." schoolboy in the Fourth form at St. Jim's. A first class goalkeeper and bowler. Appears in 45 stories and first introduced in Magnet No. 656 In Borrowed Plumes! (September 4, 1920)

== Rookwood School ==
Rookwood School was created by Charles Hamilton in 1915 for stories featured in the Boy's Friend Weekly, with the author writing as Owen Conquest. As with St. Jim's, the leading characters at Rookwood occasionally appeared in Greyfriars stories, usually when a Greyfriars Remove cricket or soccer team was matched against a Rookwood team captained by Jimmy Silver. The appearances and first introductions below are those for the Greyfriars stories in The Magnet.

- Lovell, Arthur Edward - schoolboy in Fourth Form Classical. Appears in 18 stories and first introduced in Magnet No. 382 The Slacker's Eleven! (June 5, 1915)
- Mornington, Valentine - schoolboy in Fourth Form Classical. Appears in 18 stories and first introduced in Magnet No. 453 The Bounder's Guest! (October 14, 1916)
- Newcombe, Arthur - schoolboy in Fourth Form Classical. Appears in 13 stories and first introduced in Magnet No. 382 The Slacker's Eleven! (June 5, 1915)
- Silver, James (Jimmy) - schoolboy in Fourth Form Classical and Junior Captain. Appears in 47 stories and first introduced in Magnet No. 382 The Slacker's Eleven! (June 5, 1915)

== Parents and guardians ==
"Plummy - I think your name is Plummy, little boy-"

"Cherry, ma'am!" said Bob, with a red face.

"Dear me! I thought I remembered that your name was Plummy!" said Miss Coker. "I knew it was some kind of a fruit or a vegetable."

Bob breathed hard, quite conscious of the suppressed smiles of his comrades.

"But I was going to say, Plummy - I mean, Gooseberry - did you say your name was Gooseberry- "

"Cherry!" hissed Bob.

"Yes, yes, of course, Cherry!" said Miss Coker. "A very pretty name, little boy, and very suitable indeed to a little lad with such rosy cheeks."

Bob's cheeks were very rosy indeed just then!

— The Magnet No. 1406 (1937)
- Brooke, Sir Reginald - Baronet, Uncle and guardian to Lord Mauleverer. A trustee of Mauleverer's estate. Appears in 44 stories and first introduced in Magnet No. 277 Holding the Fort! (May 31, 1913).
- Bunter, Mrs Amelia - mother to Billy, Bessie and Sammy Bunter. Billy Bunter is very fond of her. Appears in 7 stories and first introduced in Magnet No. 1076 Bunter Comes To Stay! (September 29, 1928).
- Bunter, Mr William Samuel - father to Billy, Bessie and Sammy Bunter. An unsuccessful stockbroker who frequently complains about income tax demands. Appears in 70 stories and first introduced in Magnet No. 396 Backing up Bunter! (September 11, 1915).
- Cherry, Major Robert - Bob Cherry's father and a governor of Greyfriars School. A former student of Greyfriars. Appears in 68 stories and first introduced in Magnet No. 174 A Schoolboy's Honour (June 10, 1911).
- Coker, Miss Judith - adoring aunt to Horace Coker of the Greyfriars Fifth form and Reggie Coker of the Sixth Form. Keeps her nephews well supplied with cash and food hampers. Appears in 133 stories and first introduced in Magnet No. 144 Billy Bunter's Minor! (November 12, 1910)
- Fish, Hiram K. - father of Fisher T Fish of the Greyfriars Remove. A New York businessman who has passed his money-making disposition to his son. Appears in 33 stories and first introduced in Magnet No. 150 The Yankee Schoolboy (December 24, 1910)
- Redwing, John – Father of Tom Redwing. Seaman who lives in a cottage in the coastal village of Hawkscliff. Appears in 19 stories and first introduced in Magnet No. 543 Tom Redwing's Father! (July 6, 1918).
- Vernon-Smith, Mr Samuel - millionaire father of Herbert Vernon-Smith of the Greyfriars Remove. Appears in 141 stories and first introduced in Magnet No. 124 The Thief! (June 25, 1910).
- Wharton, Miss Amy – aunt to Harry Wharton and sister to Colonel Wharton. Appears in 84 stories and first introduced in Magnet No. 1 The Making of Harry Wharton (February 15, 1908).
- Wharton, Colonel James Havelock - uncle and guardian to Harry Wharton; governor of Greyfriars School. Lives at Wharton Lodge, near Wimford in Surrey. Appears in 202 stories and first introduced in Magnet No. 1 The Making of Harry Wharton (February 15, 1908).
- Wun Chung Lung - father to Wun Lung and Hop Hi. Appears in 14 stories and first introduced in Magnet No. 1175 The Menace of Tang Wang! (August 23, 1930).

== Other recurring characters ==
The expression on Bill Lodgey's face, as he came, was aggressive, bullying. But it changed as he saw Hazel.

"I've got it!" muttered Hazel. "I - I - I managed it, after all. I - I've got it." He fumbled in his pocket.

Lodgey's eyes remained fixed on his face.

Hazel's hand came out of his pocket, with a banknote for ten pounds crumpled in it.

Lodgey made no movement to take it.

Not for twice and thrice ten pounds would Bill Lodgey have touched that banknote - with that look in the wretched boy's face. Lodgey had had many narrow escapes, in his time, from seeing the inside of a prison cell, and was by no means anxious to find himself quartered in one.

Hazel held out the banknote.

Mr. Lodgey put his hands behind him." "You young fool!" he said. "You young idiot! Put it back in your pocket!"

Hazel stared at him wildly.

What do you mean?" His voice was cracked. "What-"

"I mean," said Mr. Lodgey quietly, "that you'd better go straight back to where you found that banknote, and put it back. Think I'm blind, or what? You mad young fool!"

— The Magnet No. 1533 (1937)
- Banks, Mr Joe - local book-maker, regularly found in the Three Fishers inn. Frequently accepts illegal off-course bets. Appears in 98 stories and first introduced in Magnet No. 132 Alonzo's Plot (August 20, 1910).
- Boggs, William - village postman in Friardale. Appears in 26 stories and first introduced in Magnet No. 345 Spirited Away! (September 19, 1914).
- Clegg, Mr Nehemiah - proprietor of "Uncle Clegg's," a popular local outlet selling cakes, teas and icecreams. Appears in 167 stories and first introduced in Magnet No. 32 The Greyfriars Ventriloquist (September 19, 1908).
- Cobb, Mr Ben - landlord of the Cross Keys in Friardale, a disreputable pub near Greyfriars. Appears in 76 stories and first introduced in Magnet No. 149 The Haunted Island! (December 17, 1910)
- Drake, Jack - a former member of the Greyfriars Remove who left the school to become a young detective and assistant to Ferrers Locke. Appears in 34 stories and first introduced in Magnet No. 672 Harry Wharton's Trust! (January 10, 1920)
- Grimes, Inspector Henry - overweight police Inspector based at Courtfield. Appears in 160 stories and first introduced in Magnet No. 221 Honour Before All! (May 4, 1912)
- Hawke, Jeremiah - disreputable local bookmaker and friend of Ben Cobb, landlord of the Cross Keys. Appears in 42 stories and first introduced in Magnet No. 334 The Shadow of the Past (July 4, 1914)
- Joyce, Mr - head keeper at Popper Court and brother of Joyce the woodcutter. Appears in 15 stories and first introduced in Magnet No. Magnet No. 402 The Midnight Marauders! (October 23, 1915).
- Joyce, Mr - local woodsman. Appears in 17 stories and first introduced in Magnet No. 1253 The Hunted Master! (February 20, 1932).
- Lazarus, Mr Isaac Solomon - proprietor of a second hand shop and pawnbroker in Courtfield. Also supplies stage make-up and sometimes helps William Wibley with his stunts. Appears in 116 stories and first introduced in Magnet No. 54 Billy Bunter's House Warming (February 20, 1909).
- Lazarus, Solomon - son of Mr Isaac Lazarus and a schoolboy at Courtfield Grammar School. Appears in 58 stories and first introduced in Magnet No. 146 The Leader of the New School (November 26, 1910).
- Locke, Mrs Eleonora - wife of Dr Locke, Greyfriars headmaster. Appears in 45 stories and first introduced in Magnet No. 5 Kidnapped! (March 14, 1908).
- Locke, Ferrers - a private detective and cousin to Dr.Locke, the Greyfriars Headmaster. Also appears in non-Magnet stories. First appearance in The Gem No.16; first appearance in Magnet No.345 (September 19, 1914)
- Locke, Miss Molly - daughter of Dr Locke, Greyfriars headmaster. Appears in 22 stories and first introduced in Magnet No. 48 The New Term at Greyfriars (January 9, 1909).
- Lodgey, Mr Bill - local horse dealer, a regular customer of the Cross Keys inn. Frequently accepts illegal off-course bets. Appears in 38 stories and first introduced in Magnet No. 579 Wally's Wheeze! (March 15, 1919)
- Pillbury, Dr. – local doctor, based in Friardale. Appears in 45 stories and first introduced in Magnet No. 301 Cast up by the Sea! (November 15, 1913).
- Popper, Sir Hilton – Ill-tempered Baronet who is a local landowner and chairman of the Board of Governors of Greyfriars School. Claims title to Popper Island on the Sark river; this claim is disputed locally, which results in numerous confrontations between Sir Hilton and the Greyfriars boys. Appears in 143 stories and first introduced in Magnet No. 183 Inky Minor (August 12, 1911).
- Tozer, Police Constable Horatio - overweight local policeman based in Friardale village Appears in 132 stories and first introduced in Magnet No. 130 Billy Bunter, Limited! (August 6, 1910).
- Wells, Mr. – Butler at Wharton Lodge. Appears in 46 stories and first introduced in Magnet No. 1140 Billy Bunter's Christmas! (December 21, 1929).
