= Form (education) =

Class or group of students in a school

A form is an educational stage, class, or grouping of pupils in a school. The term is used predominantly in the United Kingdom, although some schools, mostly private, in other countries also use the title. Pupils are usually grouped in forms according to age and will remain with the same group for a number of years, or sometimes their entire school career.

== Origin ==
In the Victorian era, a form was the bench upon which pupils sat to receive lessons. In some smaller schools the entire school would be educated in a single room, with different age groups sitting on different benches.

== Traditional use ==
Form numbers. Forms are traditionally identified by a number such as "first form" or "sixth form", although it is now more common to use the school year: for example, "ten". The word is usually used in senior schools (age 11–18), although it may be used for younger children in private schools. As a result, children in their first year of senior school (aged 11–12 years) might be in the first year, third year or seventh year. Where the same form number is used for two year groups, they are differentiated by the terms "upper" and "lower". The most senior forms are traditionally lower and upper sixth or first and second year sixth.

Form names. If there is more than one form for each year group they will normally be differentiated by letters (e.g., "3S" "Upper 4A", "Lower 2B", "10J", which may be written using Roman or Arabic numerals (e.g., "IIIS/3S", "UIVA/U4A", "LIIB/L2B"). The letter used to differentiate different forms in the same year could be as simple as A, B, C, which might or might not relate to ability streams. A common practice is the year number followed by the initials of the teacher who takes the form class (e.g., a Year 7 form whose teacher is John Smith would be "7S"). Alternatively, some schools use "vertical" form classes where pupils across several year groups from the same school house are grouped together. In this case, the numeral is replaced with the first letter of the house name (e.g., "RJS" for a Red House form class whose teacher is John Smith). In the past, British schools sometimes used a letter indicating a specialism, especially in 6th forms (e.g., "S" (Science 6th), "M" (Military 6th), "N" (Nursing 6th) or "T" (Teaching 6th). Some British public schools also had a "Remove" form.

=== Related terms ===
- Pupils may be referred to by their form stage e.g. "third formers", "lower fourths"
- Pupils are based in a "form room" (equivalent to the US "homeroom")
- The teacher responsible for a form is a "form master", "form mistress", "form tutor" or "form teacher"

== Modern use ==
The traditional terminology is still used in some fee-paying schools in the United Kingdom and is commonly used in English-medium secondary schools in Hong Kong and Macau. Publicly-funded secondary schools in England, Scotland, Wales and Northern Ireland have their own standard terminologies for different educational stages, e.g. in England Year 1 to Year 13, but still refer to "forms". However, "6th form" and related terms ("6th formers", "sixth form colleges") are still widely used for the most senior students (age 16–18).

== Popular culture ==
"Forms" and their related terminology were widely used in school stories found in books, children's comics and other media in the 19th and 20th centuries. Examples include:

- The works of Angela Brazil e.g. The Luckiest Girl in the Fifth
- The works of Evelyn Smith e.g. Binkie of IIIB
- Billy Bunter - known as "The owl of the Remove" and his sister Bessie, created by Frank Richards; the Bunters appeared in comics, books, radio and television

== See also ==
- Comparison of American and British English#Education
- Remove (Education)
