= C. H. Chapman =

British illustrator and cartoonist (1879–1972)

- Born: Charles Henry Chapman; April 1, 1879; Thetford, Norfolk, England
- Died: July 15, 1972 (aged 93); Tokers Green, England
- Education: University of Reading

Charles Henry Chapman (April 1, 1879 – 15 July, 1972), who signed his work as C. H. Chapman, was a British illustrator and cartoonist best known for his work in boys' story papers such as The Magnet where the character Billy Bunter appeared. He later illustrated Bunter cartoon strips and several Bunter books published in the 1950s and 1960s.

== Life ==
Chapman was born in Thetford, Norfolk, on 1 April 1879, and attended Kendrick School in Reading, Berkshire, where he created and illustrated a school magazine, The Kendrick Comet. He studied art at the University of Reading, after which he was apprenticed to an architect. He had his first drawing published in the story paper The Captain in 1900, and over the next ten years drew for story papers and comics including Marvel, Pluck, the Boy's Friend, Boy's Herald, Boy's Leader, Illustrated Chips, Comic Cuts, Jester, Big Budget, and Ally Sloper's Half Holiday.

From 1911 to 1940 he illustrated Charles Hamilton's Greyfriars School stories, featuring Billy Bunter, for The Magnet, also drawing the magazine's covers until 1926. When the comic Knockout launched in 1938 with a Billy Bunter comic strip, Chapman drew the early instalments before being replaced by Frank Minnitt. On the death of R. J. Macdonald in 1954 he took over illustrating the Billy Bunter novels. In the 1950s and '60s he illustrated Cassell's Billy Bunter's Own annuals. In the mid-1960s he moved to Wingfield, Tokers Green Lane, Tokers Green, to the north of Caversham, commuting daily from Reading to London by train for many years. He died in 1972, survived by two daughters, Dorothy and Marjorie.
