= Billy Bunter's Christmas Party =

School story by Charles Hamilton

- Book cover from the Cassell edition
- Author: Charles Hamilton writing as Frank Richards
- Language: English
- Genre: Children, Comedy
- Published: October 1949, Charles Skilton Ltd
- Publication place: United Kingdom
- Media type: Print (Hardback)
- Preceded by: Billy Bunter in Brazil
- Followed by: Billy Bunter’s Benefit

Billy Bunter's Christmas Party is a school story by Charles Hamilton writing as Frank Richards, using the characters and settings of the Greyfriars School stories published from 1908 to 1940 in The Magnet. The book's retail price was 7s 6d.

First published in October 1949 by Charles Skilton Ltd, London, the fifth in a series of post-WWII hardback novels, it was subsequently reprinted by them in 1952 and 1957. It was reprinted in hardback in 1993 by Hawk Books.

A Greyfriars School holiday story, the novel has a colour dust jacket, frontispiece and black and white illustrations by R. J. Macdonald.

== Origins ==
After the closure of The Magnet in May 1940 due to wartime paper shortages, author Charles Hamilton was contractually barred by the publisher, Amalgamated Press, from continuing to write Greyfriars stories. However, in 1946 publisher Charles Skilton negotiated the rights to publish new stories in book form. Hamilton, delighted, suggested a payment rate of £90 per book; but Skilton, short of capital, asked Hamilton to accept royalties instead. This proved to be greatly in Hamilton's favour: he received £1,000 instead of £90 for the first book.

== Synopsis ==
Billy Bunter was better known for cadging holiday invitations than for offering hospitality himself, and it came as a great surprise to various members of the Greyfriars Remove to receive a cordial invitation from Bunter's uncle, Humphrey Carter, to spend the Christmas holidays at his country mansion, Tankerton Hall.

After some misgivings, six of Bunter's schoolmates accepted, including the Famous Five and the Australian schoolboy Sampson Quincy Iffley Field, known as Squiff, though it was not immediately apparent that the ofter was more unusual than they had thought! Not only were some of Uncle Carter's remarks distinctly puzzling, but before long there were queer noises and apparitions, and talk of the old miser, Sir Julius, who had once lived at the Hall. Did his ghost haunt the ancient apartments, and where was his fortune that had never been found? In addition, why had Bunter omitted to mention that Tankerton Hall is actually a boarding house for paying guests?

These were some of the questions which interested the Removeites who spent Christmas with Bunter, his sister Bessie Bunter and Uncle Carter. Yet one person especially had cause to be grateful for the schoolboys' presence, for through their activities, Hubert, the friendly chauffeur, became possessed of his inheritance, and in so doing relieved six Remove members in a most pressing problem.

== Radio ==
An adaptation was broadcast on BBC Radio 4 on 13 December 1986 as part of Saturday Night Theatre. The production was dramatised by Rob Gittins.

=== Cast ===
- William George Bunter: Hugh Thomas
- Bessie: Erica Eirian
- Bob Cherry: David Parfitt
- Harry Wharton: Simon Hewitt
- Quelch/Brown: Philip Bond
- Uncle Carter: Ivor Roberts
- Squiff: Lee Galpin
- Nugent: Paul Wilce
- Bull/Smith: Spencer Banks
- Hurree Singh: Sam Dastor
- Hubert/Mauly: Cornelius Garrett

== Television ==
A television dramatisation, Bunter's Christmas Party, written by Charles Hamilton as Frank Richards, was broadcast as an episode of the first series of Billy Bunter of Greyfriars School on BBC television on 4 March 1952.

=== Cast ===
- Billy Bunter: Gerald Campion
- Harry Wharton: John Charlesworth
- Bob Cherry: Keith Faulkner
- Frank Nugent: Michael Danvers-Walker
- Johnny Bull: Barry Macgregor
- Hurree Jamset Ram Singh: David Spenser
- Mr Carter: Hamlyn Benson
- Brown: Frederick Piper
- Hubert Tankerton: John Benson
