= Billy Bunter's Barring-Out =

- Book cover from the first edition
- Author: Charles Hamilton writing as Frank Richards
- Language: English
- Genre: Children, Comedy
- Published: 1948 by Charles Skilton Ltd
- Publication place: United Kingdom
- Media type: Print (Hardback)
- Preceded by: Billy Bunter's Banknote
- Followed by: Billy Bunter in Brazil (1949)

Billy Bunter's Barring-Out is a school story by Charles Hamilton writing as Frank Richards, using the characters and settings of the Greyfriars School stories published from 1908 to 1940 in The Magnet. The book's retail price was 7s 6d.

First published in October 1948 by Charles Skilton Ltd, London, the third in a series of post-WWII hardback novels, it was subsequently reprinted by them in 1950, and by Hawk in April 1994. The illustrator was R. J. Macdonald.

== Origins ==
After the closure of The Magnet in May 1940 due to wartime paper shortages, author Charles Hamilton was contractually barred by the publisher, Amalgamated Press, from continuing to write Greyfriars stories. However, in 1946 publisher Charles Skilton negotiated the rights to publish new stories in book form. Hamilton, delighted, suggested a payment rate of £90 per book; but Skilton, short of capital, asked Hamilton to accept royalties instead. This proved to be greatly in Hamilton's favour: he received £1,000 instead of £90 for the first book.

== Synopsis ==
When Billy Bunter lands Bob Cherry in trouble with their Form Master Mr. Quelch, Bob chases Bunter to kick him, but Bunter charges into the stately Remove Master, sending him flying. Bob gets six of the best and, outraged at being unjustly punished for something he didn't do, leaves the school in temper instead of doing Quelch's imposition. Thirsting for his own revenge against Bob Cherry, Bunter places a booby trap of soot and ink over the door of Study No. 13, designed to fall on Cherry's head when he enters the room. Instead, it lands on the head of Quelch who, believing Bob Cherry guilty of gross impertinence in putting it there to fall on Quelch's head, has Cherry expelled.

As all the members of the Remove gather in the Rag to say goodbye to Cherry, Bunter's conscience is pricked. He states he knows Cherry had not planted the trap, and that the entire Form should unite in barring out their teachers. The boys immediately barricade themselves into the Rag, which they stoutly defend against attacks from the Sixth Form Prefects, their teachers and the water hose of Gosling the caretaker. Can Bunter think of a scheme to save Bob Cherry without getting himself expelled in his place?
