= Barring out =

British school custom

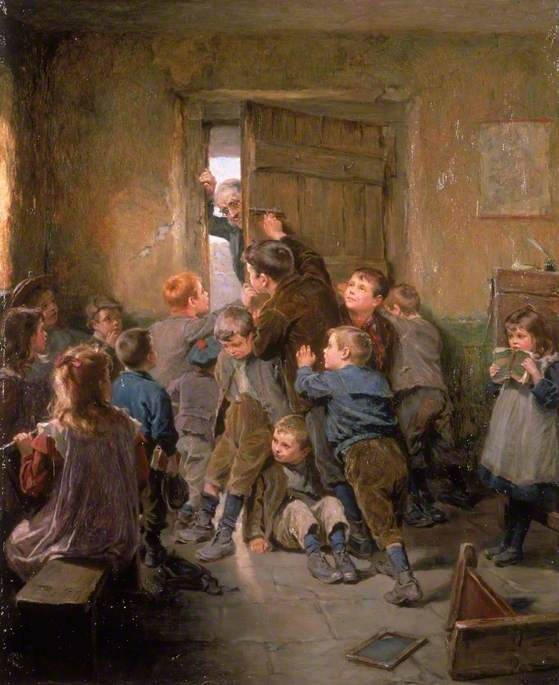
Barred Out, by Ralph Hedley (1896)

Barring out is the former custom in British schools of barring a schoolmaster from the premises.

A typical example of this practice was at the school in Bromfield, Cumbria, where it was the custom "for the scholars, at Fasting's Even (the beginning of Lent) to depose and exclude the master from the school for three days." During this period the school doors were barricaded and the boys armed with mock weapons. If the master's attempts to re-enter were successful, extra tasks were inflicted as a penalty, and willingly performed by the boys. On the third day terms of capitulation, usually in Latin verse, were signed, and these always conceded the immediate right to indulge in football and a cockfight. The custom was long retained at Eton College and figures in many school stories, including the story "The Barring Out: or Party Spirit" in The Parent's Assistant by Maria Edgeworth (1796), and the 1948 Billy Bunter story Billy Bunter's Barring-Out.

More serious incidents of barring out reportedly took place at The Royal School, Armagh, and Belfast Royal Academy in Northern Ireland; and at the Royal High School, Edinburgh.

Dr. Samuel Johnson reports a story that Joseph Addison, when a schoolboy, was the ringleader of a barring out at his school.

The custom extended to some early American Colonial schools, such as William and Mary College in Virginia, where students barred out Dr. James Blair and shot at him with pistols when he attempted to enter. According to David Hackett Fischer, the custom became common in the southern highlands and the Ohio and Mississippi valleys, though occasionally taking place elsewhere in the colonies.

Barring out continued in Falstone, a village in Northumberland, until 1940 when the headmaster William Moody, who was unaware of the custom, demanded entrance to his school and the students eventually relented and let him enter.
