= Billy Bunter of Greyfriars School =

Billy Bunter of Greyfriars School may refer to:

- Billy Bunter of Greyfriars School (novel), a 1947 novel by author Charles Hamilton, writing as Frank Richards
- Billy Bunter of Greyfriars School (TV series), a BBC Television show broadcast from 1952 to 1961
