= Sixth form =

Educational year group in the UK and some Commonwealth countries

In the education systems of England, Wales, Northern Ireland, and certain Commonwealth countries, sixth form represents the final two years of secondary education, ages 16 to 18. Pupils typically prepare for A-level or equivalent examinations like the International Baccalaureate or, until 2023, Cambridge Pre-U. Key Stage 5 covers a similar stage of education, though it refers only to academic education and not to vocational education.

== England and Wales ==
Sixth Form describes the two school years that are called by many schools the lower sixth (L6) and upper sixth (U6). The term survives from earlier form naming conventions used in both the state-maintained and private school systems. Another well known term is Year 12 and 13, carried on from the year group system started in primary school.

In the state-maintained sector in England and Wales, pupils in the first five years of secondary schooling were divided into cohorts determined by age, known as forms (these referring historically to the long backless benches on which rows of pupils sat in the classroom). Pupils started their first year of secondary school in the first form or first year; this being the academic year in which pupils would normally be 12 years old by August 31. Pupils would move up a form each year before entering the fifth form in the academic year in which they would be 16 years old by August 31. Those who stayed on at school to study for A-levels moved up into the sixth form, which was divided into the Lower Sixth and the Upper Sixth.

In the independent schools sector, the traditional public schools did not have a consistent naming convention, except for the Sixth Form. As well as the Upper Sixth and Lower Sixth, the public schools used and still use a variety of descriptions for lower forms, such as Shell, Remove, Lower Fourth, Upper Fourth, Lower Fifth, Middle Fifth, Upper Fifth.

In some private schools, the term Middle Sixth was used in place of Upper Sixth, with the latter being used for those who stayed on for an extra term to take the entrance examinations that were previously set for candidates to Oxford or Cambridge universities. Other schools described these Oxbridge examination students as being in the Seventh Form or Third Year Sixth.

In the state sector, the system was changed for the 1990–1991 academic year and school years are now numbered consecutively from primary school onwards. Year 1 is the first year of primary school after Reception. The first year of secondary school is Year 7. The Lower Sixth (the first year of sixth form) is Year 12 and the Upper Sixth (the second year of sixth form) is Year 13. Public (fee-charging) schools, along with some state schools, tend to use the old system of numbering.

In some parts of the country, specialist sixth forms were introduced, not as part of a secondary school but rather catering solely to sixth form aged students. A large proportion of English secondary schools no longer have an integral sixth form. This is mainly related to reforms in the later 20th century, where different political areas became a factor in the introduction of colleges instead of the original sixth forms. There are now numerous sixth form colleges throughout England and Wales, and in areas without these, sixth form schools and specialist further education (FE) colleges called tertiary colleges may fill the same role. As of 2015, there were 93 sixth-form colleges in England.

Sixth form itself isn't compulsory in England and Wales (although from 2013 onwards, people of sixth form age must remain in some form of education or training in England only; the school leaving age remains 16 in Wales); however, university entrance normally requires at least three A-level qualifications and perhaps one AS-level. The term AS-level is short for Advanced Subsidiary level. AS levels are academic qualifications that are most common in UK educational systems. AS-levels are considered the stepping stone qualification between GCSEs and the more commonly known A-levels.

Before the most recent reforms, students would usually select between three and five subjects from the GCSEs they have just taken, for one "AS" year, the AS exams being taken at the end of Lower Sixth. Three subjects would then be carried into the A2 year (the dropped AS being "cashed in" as a qualification), then further exams would be taken at the end of that year. The marks attained in both sets of exams were converted into UCAS points, which must meet the offer made by the student's chosen university.

Since the move to a "linear" system, students more commonly choose three or four subjects and either continue to study them for the full two years before a single set of final "A-level" exams, or choose to drop one or two subjects by sitting "AS-level" exams at the end of the first year.

In 2015, Sally Weale, writing in The Guardian, said that "While spending on schools has been largely ringfenced, sixth-form colleges have been exposed to years of cuts which have resulted in courses being dropped, staff being laid off and enrichment activities axed". In 2018, another Guardian article by Weale reported funding cuts of 21% to sixth-form provision (school sixth forms, sixth-form colleges and further education colleges) since 2010.

== Northern Ireland ==
In Northern Ireland, the equivalent of Reception is "P1", and the equivalent of the English Year 1 "P2", while the first year of secondary school is known as Year 8 or first year (rather than Year 7 as in England), and following that Lower and Upper Sixth are Year 13 and Year 14 respectively.

== Jamaica ==
In the Jamaican education system, sixth form describes the two school years which are called the Lower Sixth (6B) and Upper Sixth (6A), or grades 12 (lower) and 13 (upper), by many schools. Students are usually aged 17 or 18 by October 31.

Sixth form is a must, two years long, advanced post-secondary program, at the end of which students write the CAPE (Caribbean Advanced Proficiency Exams). These are the equivalent of the GCE A Level examinations which were the standard up until 2003. Some students still choose to sit A-levels if they wish, but in doing so they must still meet CAPE's basic subject requirements/groupings. CAPE and A-level exams are significantly harder than exams sat at the end of high school, and are often thought to be harder than most exams students will ever sit in university. Students usually select between three and five subjects from the GCSEs/CAPE they have just taken.

== Barbados, Trinidad and Tobago ==
In some secondary schools in Barbados and Trinidad and Tobago, the sixth and seventh years are called Lower and Upper Sixth, respectively.

== Other countries ==
=== Scotland ===
In the Scottish education system, the final year of school is known as Sixth Year or S6. During this year, students typically study Advanced Higher and/or Higher courses in a wide range of subjects, taking QS exams at the end of both S5 and S6. Pupils in Scotland may leave once they have reached the age of 16; those who reach 16 before 30 September may leave after national examinations in May, whilst those who are 16 by the end of February may leave the previous Christmas.

It is not essential for candidates to do a sixth year if they wish to attend a Scottish university, as they have obtained adequate Higher grades in S5 and may apply and receive acceptance, though this is conditional on being successful in the examinations. However, the vast majority of Scottish students return for S6 if they plan to attend university. Some English universities will also accept Scottish students who have obtained adequate Higher grades in S5. It was announced in December 2008 that, as from 2010, UCAS will increase the number of points awarded to those who achieve Highers and Advanced Highers.

In some cases, particularly in independent schools, the term sixth form is also used for the last two years of secondary education.

=== Ireland ===
In Ireland, the last year of secondary schooling is called the Sixth Year. There is no Sixth Form per se but a similar concept exists called the Senior Cycle where school pupils aged 16–19 prepare in their final two years for the Leaving Certificate examination.

=== India and Nepal ===
In India and Nepal, the Higher Secondary Education is called "Class 11th" and "Class 12th" which is also known as "+1" and "+2" respectively of the "10+2" educational system. In India, this is also referred to as "Intermediate" in Andhra Pradesh, Telangana and Uttar Pradesh and Bihar State Boards, " Pre-University Course"(PUC) in Karnataka State Board, and "Junior College" or "Higher Secondary Certificate" in Maharashtra State Board, in CBSE and CISCE Boards it is called "Class 11th" and "Class 12th".

=== Malta ===
The term sixth form is used to define the final two years of education before entering university in Malta.

=== Malaysia ===
In Malaysia, a sixth form is known as "Tingkatan 6", and lasts for three semesters.

=== Singapore ===
In Singapore the equivalent of a sixth form college would be called a junior college, where pupils take their Cambridge GCE A-levels after two years. Prior to the 1990s, these two years were known as "Pre-University" (Pre-U) 1 and 2.

=== Australia and New Zealand ===
In New Zealand, under the old system of forms, standards and juniors, sixth form was the equivalent of Year 12 in today's system. Year 13 was known as seventh form. Australia also sometimes uses the term for year 12, though the Australian year 12 is equivalent to the NZ Year 13 / seventh form and the UK's upper sixth / Year 13.

=== Brunei ===
In Brunei, sixth form comprises Year 12 and 13, which may also be referred to as Lower and Upper Sixth. At the end of the schooling, students sit for Brunei-Cambridge GCE A Level. Students may also opt to take Advanced Subsidiary Level or AS Level halfway at the end of Lower Sixth or halfway through Upper Sixth. Sixth form is not compulsory, but a preferable choice for students wishing to continue in academic studies leading to university level.

=== United States ===
In some college preparatory schools in the United States, such as The Hill School, Woodberry Forest School, Ethical Culture Fieldston School, Kent School, Pomfret School, The Church Farm School, The Haverford School, Portsmouth Abbey School and more, sixth form refers to the final year of education prior to college. It is the equivalent of twelfth grade in the US education system.

== See also ==
- Sixth form college
- Education in the United Kingdom
- Eleventh grade and Twelfth grade—Equivalent American grades for this age range
- Ontario Academic Credit
