= R. J. Macdonald =

R. J. Macdonald (seated) with Charles Hamilton in 1946

Reginald James Macdonald (14 April 1879–17 December 1954), who signed his work as R. J. Macdonald, was a Scottish illustrator and cartoonist best known for his work in the boys' school stories in The Gem written by Charles Hamilton writing as Martin Clifford. After World War II from 1947 to his death in 1954 he provided colour and black and white illustrations for the Billy Bunter novels by the same author.

Macdonald was born in Dundee in Scotland in 1879, one of three children of Lillias Renton née Kennedy (1855-1929) and John Baxter Macdonald (1848-1919), a commission merchant. In 1901 he was lodging at an address in Hornsey, then in Middlesex, where his occupation was listed as Black and White Artist.

On 9 October 1914 he enlisted in the Royal Naval Volunteer Reserve, serving during World War I until he was discharged in June 1916 having reached the rank of Lieutenant. From 1916 to 1939 he produced numerous black and white illustrations for the boys' school stories in The Gem written by Charles Hamilton writing as Martin Clifford. An article about Hamilton in the Picture Post in May 1946 that featured Macdonald and his artwork came to the notice of publisher Charles Skilton, who offered a contract to Hamilton for a hardback series of stories about Greyfriars School, the first volume of which, Billy Bunter of Greyfriars School, was published in September 1947. Macdonald produced a colour frontispiece and black and white illustrations for this and the subsequent 16 volumes until his death in 1954, when C. H. Chapman took over as illustrator.

In 1905 he married Dorothy (1878-1933) with whom he had a son, Ian Ronald Macdonald (1906-1930).

In 1939 he married Alice Dorothy Wynne Williams (1892-1978) in Chelsea and he and his new wife lived in Flat 5 in Carlyle House in Chelsea when his occupation was listed as ‘Artist (Black and White).

In his later years he lived in Lymington in Hampshire. He died in December 1954 and left an estate valued at £7545 19s. 7d. to his widow.

== Books illustrated by R. J. Macdonald ==
- Billy Bunter of Greyfriars School, 1947
- Billy Bunter's Banknote, 1948
- Billy Bunter's Barring-Out, 1948
- Billy Bunter in Brazil, 1949
- Billy Bunter's Christmas Party, 1949
- Bessie Bunter of Cliff House School, 1949
- Billy Bunter's Benefit, 1950
- Billy Bunter Among the Cannibals, 1950
- Billy Bunter's Postal Order, 1951
- Billy Bunter Butts In, 1951
- Billy Bunter and the Blue Mauritius, 1952
- Billy Bunter's Beanfeast, 1952
- Billy Bunter's Brainwave, 1953
- Billy Bunter's First Case, 1953
- Billy Bunter the Bold, 1954
- Bunter Does His Best, 1954
- Billy Bunter's Double, 1955
