= Bunter Hund =

Bunter Hund (German for "coloured dog") may refer to:

- Bunter Hund, the International Short Film Festival in Munich
- Bunter Hund, a 2007 studio album by Reinhard Mey
- Bunter Hund, a particular hand in the card game of Skat
- Der Bunte Hund, a children's literature magazine by Beltz & Gelberg
- Bunte Hunde, a 1995 film by Lars Becker

== See also ==
- Bunter
