= Billy Bunter of Greyfriars School (novel) =

1947 novel by Charles Hamilton

- Book cover from the first edition
- Author: Charles Hamilton writing as Frank Richards
- Language: English
- Genre: Children, Comedy
- Published: September 1947, Charles Skilton Ltd
- Publication place: United Kingdom
- Media type: Print (Hardback)
- Preceded by: None
- Followed by: Billy Bunter's Banknote

Billy Bunter of Greyfriars School is a school story by Charles Hamilton writing as Frank Richards, using the characters and settings of the Greyfriars School stories published from 1908 to 1940 in The Magnet. The book's retail price was 7s 6d.

The novel was an immediate success, with sales of 25,000 copies within a few weeks. This was the maximum allowed during post-war paper shortages. The novel was reprinted by the original publisher in 1947, 1948 and 1950. Subsequently, it was republished by Armada in August 1968 and by Hawk in January 1991. The illustrator was R. J. Macdonald.

== Origins ==
After the closure of The Magnet in May 1940 due to wartime paper shortages, author Charles Hamilton was contractually barred by the publisher, Amalgamated Press, from continuing to write Greyfriars stories. However in 1946 publisher Charles Skilton negotiated the rights to publish new stories in book form. Hamilton, delighted, suggested a payment rate of £90 per book; but Skilton, short of capital, asked Hamilton to accept royalties instead. This proved to be greatly in Hamilton's favour: he received £1,000 instead of £90 for the first book.

== Synopsis ==
Bunter is his usual self: untruthful, shirking on prep, avoiding games, and stealing food from the studies of others, but for Mr Quelch the final straw comes when Bunter falls asleep in a History lesson. He warns Bunter that unless he improves in every way as a student in the few remaining weeks of the term then he will write to Mr Bunter advising him that he is wasting his money in sending Billy to Greyfriars School. Mr Bunter will take his son out of school, which will result in - work! Billy will have to start working in his father's stockbroking firm. Billy Bunter is determined to turn things around at school and become a model student - but, while the spirit is willing the flesh is weak! But after Quelch's encounter with a violent footpad will things come right for Bunter?
