= Remove (education) =

School year group

A Remove class in education is or was a group of pupils at an English public school, typically a year group: for example the year group between the fourth form and the fifth form. In the state-maintained secondary schools the Remove class was a class for pupils who had already moved through Fifth Form (Year 11) but needed to resit the Ordinary Level ('O'level) GCE examination.

The name originally described the pupils who had been removed (moved on an academic year) from the class described as the Shell. The latter name originates from Westminster School where junior pupils were taught in an alcove which resembled a shell. Over time usage evolved differently across individual schools.

Examples at various schools:

- At Ampleforth College, the ‘remove’ class (Year 11) is the year between second form (Year 10) and middle sixth (year 12). This is still applicable today.
- At Bancroft's School, the ‘Removes’ are pupils in their second year of secondary education (Year 8).
- At The King's School Canterbury, a ‘Remove’ denotes a pupil in their second year, between Shell and fifth form: in other words, a Year 10 pupil. This system is still used today.
- At Radley College, 'Remove’ is the second year, coming between the Shell (first year) and Fifth (third year or GCSE year), thus corresponding to the modern year 10.
- At Marlborough College, the ‘Remove’ is the second year, coming after the Shell (first year) and the Hundred (third year or GCSE year).
- At Hurstpierpoint College, Remove is above Shell and before Fifth Form.
- In Shrewsbury School in the 1980s, the 'Remove' was the last year before the Sixth Form, in which students did their 'O' level exams. It was the equivalent of the modern Year 11.
- As of 2019 at Harrow School, the Remove is below the Fifth Form and above the Shell.
- At Mill Hill School, the 'Remove' is the year between 4th form and 5th form. It is the first year of the 2-year GCSE study period (the second being the 5th form). Remove is for students aged 14–15.
- At Eton College, the Remove was historically immediately above the Fourth Form and corresponded to "E Block" (Year 10).
- At Queen's Gate School, it is Year 7.
- At The King's School, Worcester, the Lower Remove and Upper Remove are between the Upper Fourth and Fifth Form, corresponding with years 9 and 10.
- At Haileybury, the 'Removes' are pupils in the first year of Upper School (Year 9).
- At Wilson's Grammar School, Camberwell South East London (now moved to Sutton and renamed Wilson's School) in the 60s the Remove or 5R was a class of individuals who needed to get more or better Ordinary Level GCE results for career purposes or to enter Advanced level GCE courses. The term was used to indicate pupils had been removed or held back from the usual expected progression so was referred to pejoratively or disrespectfully as a place for academic under-achievers.

== In popular culture ==
In Frank Richards' Billy Bunter series, the Remove Class is the focus for all the stories, where the term is used as a synonym for Lower Fourth.
