= The Magnet =

UK weekly boys' story paper

- Magnet Number 1, 1908
- Editor: Charles Maurice Down (1919–1940)
- Illustrator: C. H. Chapman (1911–1940)
- Staff writers: Charles Hamilton
- Frequency: Weekly
- Publisher: Amalgamated Press
- First issue: 15 February 1908; 118 years ago
- Final issue Number: May 18, 1940; 86 years ago 1,683
- Country: United Kingdom

The Magnet was a British weekly boys' story paper published by Amalgamated Press. It ran from 1908 to 1940, publishing a total of 1,683 issues.

Each issue contained a long school story about the boys of Greyfriars School, a fictional public school located somewhere in Kent. The most famous Greyfriars character was Billy Bunter, of the Remove. The stories were written under the pen-name of "Frank Richards." The vast majority of the stories were written by author Charles Hamilton, although substitute writers were sometimes used when he could not supply copy. Most issues of The Magnet also included a shorter serial story (a variety of detective, scouting, and adventure yarns were featured), and many issues also included a newspaper ostensibly produced by the characters themselves and called the Greyfriars Herald. These parts of the paper were not written by Charles Hamilton.

== History ==
The stories began in 1908, before the First World War, and continued through the privations of that war and the Great Depression of the 1930s that followed. The Magnet was aimed primarily at working-class boys who would never go to a public school themselves.

=== Red Magnet era – 1908–1915 ===
So-called because of the colour of its cover in this period, The Magnet was created by an Amalgamated Press staff editor named Percy Griffiths, building on the success of the earlier boys' paper The Gem. These early years saw the creation of nearly all of the characters who would populate Greyfriars for the remainder of its history. In its heyday, The Magnet had a weekly press run in excess of 200,000.

=== Blue and White era – 1915–1922 ===
The cover changed to blue and white as a result of the unavailability of red dye due to the war. This era saw a profusion of stories written by authors other than Hamilton, one of whom was the editor J. N. Pentelow, the only substitute writer whose work was given preference over that of Hamilton. Wartime paper shortages reduced the length of each weekly issue.

=== Blue and Orange era – 1922–1937 ===
Blue and Orange covers were introduced, and a growing proportion of stories were written by Hamilton, as he came to see The Magnet as the main focus of his attention. By 1927–1930, only a handful of stories were the work of other writers. The last substitute story, "Speedway Coker" by M.F. Duffy, appeared in issue No.1220, published in July 1931; from then until the paper's end in 1940, Hamilton wrote every Greyfriars story. The idea of a series of several linked stories appearing in consecutive issues started to dominate and become the key ingredient of this period, allowing increased complexity of plotting and often stimulating finer writing. Most of the best-remembered stories appeared in this period, including the Courtfield Cracksman, Methuselah, Lancaster, and Brander rebellion series, as well as several ambitious travel series to faraway places such as India, China, South Seas, Egypt, and East Africa, which many of its readers would never see, and in truth most of which Hamilton himself never saw, either.

Some Hamilton enthusiasts and scholars have suggested that the central years of this era represent a 'Golden Age', a sustained period that saw a consistently high standard in the quality of stories and series, occurring from the late 1920s to the early 1930s. Charles Hamilton himself agreed that his best work for The Magnet took place around this time.

All the same, by 1930 the paper's circulation had fallen to 120,000 as a result of the direct competition of DC Thomson story papers. As described by author Jeffrey Richard: "This became particularly serious in 1933 with the launch of The Hotspur and the appearance of Red Circle, a tougher, more rambunctious and more up-to-date public school than Greyfriars . . . which wooed schoolboy readers away."

=== Salmon Pink era – 1937–1940 ===
The use of long serials continued, albeit often recycling the plots of earlier years. The covers changed to salmon pink for the last four years.

A decline in circulation (down to 41,660 in 1940), coupled with paper shortages, meant that The Magnet could not survive. The final issue, in 1940, was the opening story in a new series; at least four other issues are known to have been already completed, but these were never published, and are now presumed lost.

After closing, it merged into the comic Knockout, renamed Knockout Comic and The Magnet, in which the Magnet characters reappeared.

=== After closure ===
After 1940, new Greyfriars stories by Hamilton continued to appear in book form, published initially by Charles Skilton and later by Cassells, in a series which continued until Hamilton's death in 1961 (although some of the novels appeared posthumously even later); and in a television series, also written by Hamilton, which ran from 1951 to 1961 on the BBC.

Some stories that had originally seen publication in The Magnet appeared during the mid-1960s, and as late as 1972, from Armada Books and from Paul Hamlyn. Furthermore, most of the 1,683 issues of The Magnet were reprinted in hardback form by publisher W Howard Baker, under his Howard Baker and Greyfriars Book Club imprints, between 1969 and 1990.

== Editors ==
- 1908–1911 Percy Griffiths — nicknamed "Pushful Percy" owing to his dynamic character. He left Amalgamated Press suddenly in 1911, and nothing is known of his subsequent history.
- 1911–1916 Herbert Allen Hinton — a military man who left to take up a wartime commission.
- 1916–1919 John Nix Pentelow — a cricket authority and writer who took over when many of the editorial staff were occupied with the war. He contributed many stories himself on the pretext of a shortage in supply from Charles Hamilton and other writers. His writing is remembered for one story when an established character, Courtney of the Sixth Form, was killed off.
- 1919–1921 Herbert Allen Hinton (again) — he returned as editor but left rather abruptly in 1921, due to plagiarism of a Magnet story.
- 1919–1940 Charles Maurice Down — a former public schoolboy, who conceived the idea of the very popular 'Holiday Annual'. Probably the editor with whom Charles Hamilton got along the best. The author in fact stated that many attributes of Mr. Down could be discerned in the schoolboy character Arthur Augustus D'arcy, found in the other companion paper—The Gem story-paper. "Gussy", the character in question, had a kind heart, and was known for his sartorial elegance and many positive traits.

== Illustrators ==
A large part of the appeal of The Magnet lay in the illustrations, of which there would typically be five per issue in addition to the cover. The illustrators were:

- Hutton Mitchell (1908) — produced the original drawings of Billy Bunter. His characters tended to be more prominent with the background detail kept to a minimum. He had a clear-cut style.
- Arthur H. Clarke (1908–1911) — the second Magnet artist. Some consider his depiction of the schoolmasters a bit grim-looking and Victorian in appearance, and there was generally much of a sameness about his characters. However, his work was well up to standard.
- C. H. Chapman (1911–1940) — first gave Bunter checked trousers. In the beginning he was told to emulate the style of Arthur H. Clarke, but then came into his own during the early 1920s. Carried on illustrating Greyfriars stories after The Magnet closed.
- Leonard Shields (1926–1940) — from his inception in the India series of 1926, and throughout the remainder of The Magnet (sharing some drawings with C. H. Chapman), executed some very fine drawings including very many covers.
- R. J. Macdonald (1947-1954), previously illustrated The Gem for thirty years. Illustrated the post-War Bunter novels. On his death in 1954 was succeeded by C. H. Chapman.

== See also ==
- Greyfriars School
- The Gem
- Charles Hamilton
- Billy Bunter
- Bessie Bunter
- Tom Merry
