= Billy Bunter =

Fictional schoolboy created by Frank Richards

- Billy Bunter as depicted by The Magnet artist C. H. Chapman
- First appearance: The Magnet No. 1 "The Making of Harry Wharton" (1908)
- Last appearance: Bunter's Last Fling (1965)
- Created by: Charles Hamilton writing as Frank Richards
- Portrayed by: Gerald Campion (BBC TV series, 1952–1961); Tom Janssen (Dutch film, 1978); Raymond van Haaf (Dutch films, 1983 & 1984)

In-universe information
- Full name: William George Bunter
- Nickname: "The Owl of the Remove"
- Occupation: Schoolboy
- Family: William Samuel Bunter (father); Amelia Bunter (mother); Bessie Bunter (sister); Sammy Bunter (brother)
- Relatives: Eliza Bunter (great-aunt); Calude Bunter (uncle); George Bunter (uncle); James Bunter (uncle); Claribel Bunter (aunt); Primrose Bunter (aunt); Humphrey Carter (uncle); Wally Bunter (cousin)
- Religion: Church of England
- Nationality: British
- School: Greyfriars School

William George Bunter is a fictional schoolboy created by Charles Hamilton using the pen name Frank Richards. He features in stories set at Greyfriars School, a fictional English public school in Kent, originally published in the boys' weekly story paper The Magnet from 1908 to 1940. The character has appeared in novels, on television, in stage plays and in comic strips.

He is in the Lower Fourth form of Greyfriars School, known as the Remove, whose members are 14 to 15 years of age. Time is frozen in the Greyfriars stories: although the reader sees the passing of the seasons, the characters' ages do not change and they remain in the same year groups. Originally a minor character, Bunter's role was expanded over the years with his antics being heavily used in the stories for comic relief and to advance the plots.

Bunter is portrayed as greedy, self-indulgent, lazy, deceitful, pompous, and conceited. He is also depicted as frequently unaware of his own shortcomings and as imagining himself to be handsome, talented, and aristocratic. At the same time, the stories occasionally present him as courageous and generous, particularly in his concern for his mother. His optimism, dishonesty, and unsuccessful attempts to conceal his actions are recurring sources of comedy in the stories.

== Origins ==
Charles Hamilton invented the character for an unpublished story in the late 1890s. He claimed Bunter was derived from three persons: a corpulent editor, a short-sighted relative, and another relative who was perpetually trying to raise a loan.

The identity of the fat editor is unclear: various sources suggest either Lewis Ross Higgins, editor of a number of comic papers and who is described as resembling the author G. K. Chesterton; or Percy Griffith, the original editor of The Magnet. The short-sighted relative was Hamilton's younger sister Una, who had suffered poor sight since childhood, and who had been wont to "peer at him somewhat like an Owl"; while the other relative was his older brother Alex, who was described as "generally anxious to borrow a pound or two" on the strength of the anticipated arrival of a cheque that never materialised.

== Magnet stories ==
Billy Bunter featured in 1,670 of the 1,683 issues of The Magnet published during the 32-year period from 1908 to 1940. He was introduced in Magnet No. 1 "The Making of Harry Wharton" (1908) as a minor character, but developed into one of the principal characters of the stories as author Charles Hamilton realised his comic potential.

George Orwell described him as "a real creation. His tight trousers against which boots and canes are constantly thudding, his astuteness in search of food, his postal order which never turns up, have made him famous wherever the Union Jack waves." (Orwell 1940)

In addition to stories set at Greyfriars School, he featured in many travel series, with trips to China, India, Egypt, Brazil, Hollywood and the South Seas.

=== Appearance ===
The original Bunter and Dicky Nugent from page 3 of Magnet No. 100, 8 January 1910

In his first appearance, Billy Bunter was introduced thus:

The newcomer was a somewhat stout junior, with a broad, pleasant face and an enormous pair of spectacles.

Bunter's big round spectacles and rolling gait earned him the nickname the "Fat Owl of the Remove".

In the early stories, both Bunter and classmate Johnny Bull were described as "stout" in appearance; and it was Magnet illustrator C. H. Chapman who first put Bunter into checked-pattern trousers to distinguish the two characters. With the passage of time, the illustrations showed Bunter's circumference ever more pronounced, while Johnny Bull became indistinguishable from the other schoolboys.

A list of the members of the Remove (Lower Fourth) form was published in Magnet No. 1659 "Billy Bunter's Bargain" (1939), and provided the boys' ages, heights, and weights. Billy Bunter's age is given as 15 years 1 month; his height as 4 ft 9 in (145 cm); and his weight as 14 st 12 1/2 lb (208.5 lb; 94.6 kg).

=== Character ===
On many levels, Bunter is deeply unattractive, amply displaying most of the seven deadly sins: pride, wrath, envy, sloth and, most especially, greed and gluttony (though sexual lust is absent in the innocent world of the stories). Bunter is also nosy, deceitful and obtuse. However these traits are softened by his cheery optimism, his comically transparent untruthfulness and his reliable ineptitude when attempting to conceal his antics from his schoolfellows and schoolmasters.

From the very first Magnet story, Bunter suffers an ongoing shortage of cash and is forever attempting to borrow money from his schoolfellows, explaining that he is imminently expecting a postal money order from one of his "titled relations". Over the course of stories spanning several decades, Bunter's celebrated postal order almost never materialises; and the subject becomes a long-running cause of railery in the Greyfriars Remove. Even so, Bunter is a skilful and persistent sponger and succeeds in extracting countless loans from his schoolfellows. Wealthier schoolboys such as Lord Mauleverer frequently part with a few shillings to be rid of Bunter; but even the notoriously tight-fisted American junior Fisher T. Fish is once persuaded to loan him cash.

Bunter's morals are peculiarly his own. He has every intention of repaying his debts, but they end up lingering for months or years. He is obsessed with food – the sweeter and stickier, the better – and he compulsively helps himself to his schoolfellows' sweets, cakes and hampers, for which he earns countless kickings. But despite his complete lack of scruples in such matters, Bunter is otherwise as honest as any other Greyfriars schoolboy. He would never dream of stealing money or valuables.

In the early stories, Bunter was associated with his stammering stock phrase: "I'm s-sincerely sorry". As his character developed, the stammer disappeared, and his stock phrases became his greeting "I say, you fellows!", the reproachful "Oh really, Wharton!" (or whichever character he is addressing), the anguished exclamation "Yaroooh!" and the distinctive giggle "He, he, he!"

Although Bunter has a keen sense of his own importance, this is rarely shared by anyone else. A notable exception occurs in a 1932 story, during an election for a new Remove Form Captain. The support of the form divides equally between two candidates, leaving Bunter with the casting vote, which is keenly solicited by both camps. Bunter becomes the centre of attention, which he exploits to the full. His view of the two candidates illustrates his priorities:

"I'm thinking it out, Toddy," he answered, without moving. "Can't say I like either of the beasts much! Of course, in some ways, Smithy would make a better Form captain than Cherry."
"How do you make that out, fathead—I mean, old fellow!"
"Well, Skinner thinks that if Smithy gets in, a man will be able to dodge games practice without being reported to Wingate."
"Oh crumbs!"
That consideration, evidently, had a strong appeal for Bunter!
"Still, Cherry's not a bad chap in some ways!" said the fat Owl. "He's a good deal more civil than Smithy, if a fellow drops into his study to tea."
"Oh!" gasped Toddy.
"And—he's not reeking with money like Smithy, but, he's a jolly good deal easier to touch for a small loan when a fellow's been disappointed about a postal order," added Bunter thoughtfully.
Peter Todd gazed at him. Bunter evidently had his own original ideas about the qualities that were required in a Form captain!

— The Magnet No. 1258 "Bounder and Captain!" (1932)

In the classroom, Bunter's erudition is slight to non-existent. His extreme laziness and ineptitude is the despair of his Form master, Mr Quelch.

Bunter's personal habits are lazy and slovenly. He is always the last to rise in the morning and always chooses to remain in bed a few extra minutes instead of washing. His handkerchief is permanently filthy, and his waistcoat usually displays remains of his breakfast.

Bunter was blinking now behind his big spectacles, and his spectacles were damp as he blinked.

In Bunter's fat circumference, under his many layers of fat, there was a heart, and in Bunter's heart at the present moment there was a horrible quake. His mother was ill! Bunter, for once, was thinking of someone other than himself. He was thinking of his mother. The mater was ill, and she wanted him! The poor old mater!

"Oh!" gasped Bunter. "Oh!"

— The Magnet (1931)

A running theme at the beginning of each holiday season is Bunter's persistent attempts to avoid going home and instead to gatecrash the holidays of his schoolfellows, and their generally unsuccessful attempts to avoid Bunter's company.

He has two talents: for cooking, and an uncanny ability to imitate voices (usually called ventriloquism in the stories). This talent was developed in the early Magnet stories, commencing with Magnet No. 32 "The Greyfriars Ventriloquist" (1908). In a series of stories in which Bunter unsuccessfully attempts, in turn, a physical exercise regime, hypnotism, and mind reading, a visiting ventriloquism show inspires him to believe himself a born ventriloquist. "More like a born idiot", comments Bob Cherry – but Bunter perseveres and eventually masters the art. It is a talent unappreciated by his schoolfellows, since he generally uses it for mischief, or to get himself out of trouble.

Among Bunter's few virtues is an occasional tendency to display courage for the sake of others, despite his extreme terror on such occasions. This characteristic was first seen in Magnet No. 364 "Surprising the School" (1915) when he saved his schoolmaster's niece, Cora Quelch, from an angry bull, and was afterwards repeated many times. Unfortunately, Bunter's vanity frequently leads him to spoil matters by boasting and exaggerating afterwards. Oddly enough, he also displays generosity on the rare occasions when he is in possession of food or cash.

Billy Bunter's main redeeming feature is his very genuine love and concern for his mother. This is seen in several stories, usually involving his mother falling ill, which draws out Bunter's unselfish side (Magnet Nos. 1016, 1206 and 1532).

=== Bunter as a plot driver ===
For the first fifteen years of the Magnet stories, Bunter was one of the crowd. From the mid-1920s, as Hamilton increasingly developed Bunter's comic potential, he also began to use his antics to initiate and drive forward the plots.

Conspiratorial conversations or gossip would be overheard by Bunter through a keyhole, or from under the seat in a rail compartment while hiding from the ticket inspector, or under a table hiding from some outraged fellow whose food he had purloined. He would invariably gossip about such knowledge. Letters would be purloined by Bunter and not reach the intended recipient. Bunter's ventriloquism skills would provoke conflicts between other characters. Whilst he was usually not the main protagonist, his influence as a comic interlude and a plot driver was felt at every turn.

In the "Secret Seven" series of 1934, the entire plotline is initiated by Bunter's stupidity, which causes a road accident that sends a number of leading characters to the hospital.

=== Bunter as a principal character ===
During The Magnet era, Billy Bunter is not yet the permanent principal character he would become in the post-war era. Each principal character would take a leading role in turn. Stronger characters such as Remove Captain Harry Wharton, the hard and rebellious Herbert Vernon-Smith, and Fifth form duffer Horace Coker are frequently given leading roles in their own series; and even lesser characters such as American junior Fisher T. Fish and aspiring actor William Wibley would occasionally be brought to the fore in their own series.

Eventually, Bunter took his turn with the rest, in a number of stories that placed him as the lead protagonist. Some notable examples include:

- The "Bunter Court" series from 1925 (Magnet Nos. 910 to 917) – by a combination of trickery and co-incidence, Bunter manages to obtain the tenancy of a stately home, Combermere Lodge, and passes it off as Bunter Court. Despite the author's comment that this was one of the most contrived plots he had ever been forced to employ, this series is highly regarded. Remarkably, Billy Bunter succeeds in being entertaining without the reader ever being invited to feel the slightest affection or sympathy for him. After borrowing from his guests to pay the servants' wages, and locking the estate agent, the butler, and others into the cellar to hide his tracks, Bunter finally flees before receiving his just desserts.
- The "Whiffles Circus" series from 1928 (Magnet Nos. 1069 to 1076) – Billy Bunter assumes the identity of Mr Whiffles, the proprietor of a circus, by stealing his clothes, wig and false whiskers, and sustains the impersonation over the course of the storyline when all the circus hands mistake him for the proprietor.
- The "Bunter £100 Boater Hat" series from 1933 (Magnet Nos. 1325 to 1326) – tramp Harold Hinks steals a £100 note belonging to Vernon-Smith's father and hides it under the lining of Bunter's straw hat. However, Bunter is wearing a borrowed hat at the time, leading to Mr Hinks' hapless attempts to recover the banknote by snatching a succession of wrong hats from Bunter's head. Charles Hamilton considered this one of his funniest stories.
- The "Popper Island Rebellion" series from 1934 (Magnet Nos. 1374 to 1382) – Billy Bunter is expelled after being wrongfully accused of drenching Fifth Form master Mr Prout in ink. The Remove rise up in his support and build a fortified camp on Popper Island, which they successfully defend against a number of assaults by the prefects and other seniors.

In 1929, the editors of The Magnet persuaded Charles Hamilton to drop the character of Billy Bunter altogether for several editions and attempt a storyline in the style of an action thriller, resulting in the "Ravenspur Grange" series (Magnet Nos. 1122 to 1125). This provoked a strong outcry from Magnet readers dismayed at Bunter's disappearance, and Billy Bunter would never be absent from the stories again.

=== Racism and chauvinism ===
Being a freeborn republican and democrat, and a firm believer in liberty, equality, and fraternity, Fishy might have been expected to extend the hand of friendship to the black man from Africa.

But Fishy didn't. The rights of man, as Fishy often told the other fellows, were embodied in the American "Constitootion." But the rights of man, it appeared, were limited to the smaller section of mankind whose skins were white. The majority of the human race, being coloured, were altogether excluded from the rights of man, and, indeed, from all rights whatsoever, according to the democratic beliefs of Fisher T. Fish.

The news that a black man was actually sheltered under the ancient roof of Greyfriars moved Fishy to burning indignation.

— The Magnet No.774 (1922)

Charles Hamilton's writings displayed a pronounced prejudice against Americans. His American characters were either comical or had unsavoury tendencies such as racism or usury. A notable example is Billy Bunter's fellow form member Fisher T. Fish, the son of a New York businessman, whose moneylending frequently brings him into conflict with the school authorities and who, on occasion, displays racist behaviour.

In comparison with contemporary literature, the Greyfriars stories are unusually firm in rejecting racism. Hamilton uses the technique of giving racist dialogue to antihero characters in a way that demonstrates the offensive nature of racist attitudes, including Bunter himself, who often uses language that modern-day readers would characterise as racist.

In an age when the word "nigger" was fairly common, the Greyfriars stories consistently emphasised the offensive nature of the term from as early as 1922 and the narratives even included unfashionable anti-British sentiments in stories set against the background of imperial India.

=== Family ===
Billy Bunter has two siblings: a younger sister, Elizabeth Gertrude (Bessie), who attends the nearby Cliff House School, and a younger brother, Samuel Tuckless (Sammy) in the Second Form at Greyfriars School. Bessie first appears in The Magnet No. 582 "The Artful Dodger" (1919), before appearing as a regular character in School Friend later that year. Bessie appears in a total of 116 Magnet stories. Sammy Bunter first appears in The Magnet No. 144 "Billy Bunter's Minor" (1910) and appears in a further 291 Magnet stories.

There is little love lost among the three siblings:

Bessie was, in Billy's opinion, a cat. Bessie's opinion of Billy could not be expressed so laconically. Her vocabulary on the subject was very extensive indeed. Only on one subject could Billy and Bessie agree. That was on the subject of Sammy. They heartily agreed that Sammy was a little beast.

Their father is Mr William Samuel Bunter, a portly, largely unsuccessful, stockbroker with a severe manner; although it is noted that "like many middle-aged gentlemen, Mr. Bunter was better tempered after breakfast." He is perpetually complaining about income tax and school fees, and is brusque with his children. As often as Billy writes to ask for pocket money, his father refuses. By contrast, Billy is particularly close to his mother, Mrs Amelia Bunter, a kindly lady who appears only briefly in seven stories.

Billy's cousin Walter Gilbert (Wally) Bunter was introduced in Magnet No. 333 "The Dark Horse" (1914) and appears in a further 32 Magnet stories. He is Billy's exact double, excepting only his spectacles, but is his opposite in every other respect.

Other members of the Bunter family to appear briefly over the years include Billy's uncles James, George and Claude, aunts Prudence and Claribel, great-aunt Eliza Judith, and (in a one-off story) Sir Foulkes Bunter and his son.

Bunter boasts of living at Bunter Court, a stately home with liveried servants and a fleet of chauffeured Rolls-Royce cars. In fact, this turns out to be the modest Bunter Villa in Surrey, with a maid, a cook and a single Ford car.

== Reprints ==
Many stories from The Magnet were reprinted in the Schoolboys Own Library before World War II, and some by Armada and Paul Hamlyn in the 1970s. Most of the 1,683 issues of The Magnet were reprinted in hardback facsimile by publisher W. Howard Baker, under his Howard Baker and Greyfriars Book Club imprints between 1969 and 1990.

== Post-war stories ==
=== Hardback stories ===
Following the closure of The Magnet in 1940, Hamilton had little work; but he became known as the author of the Greyfriars stories following an interview in the London Evening Standard.

Although he had written many thousands of stories between 1900 and 1940 for the Amalgamated Press, he had used dozens of pen names, and was himself unknown prior to the newspaper article. It was not even widely known that his many pseudonyms represented a single writer.

Hamilton was at first prevented from continuing the Greyfriars saga, as the Amalgamated Press claimed exclusive rights to all the characters except Billy Bunter, who did appear in a Sparshott story in 1946. However, by 1947 they relented, and Hamilton contracted with publisher Charles Skilton for a series of stories to be issued in hardback. The first of these, Billy Bunter of Greyfriars School, illustrated by R. J. Macdonald, was published in September 1947. The series continued for the rest of Hamilton's life. In the 1950s the initial novels were reprinted by Cassells, who continued the series.

=== Radio ===
Billy Bunter has been adapted in a radio play several times, the last a 90-minute adaptation of the novel Billy Bunter's Christmas Party on BBC Radio 4 Saturday Night Theatre in December 1986.

In the 1990s, a series of 15-minute dramas adapted from Charles Hamilton's novels were performed by The Goodies (Graeme Garden, Bill Oddie, Tim Brooke-Taylor) for BBC radio.

A radio documentary about the character aired in 1980, on the 40th anniversary of the closure of The Magnet.

=== Television ===
Charles Hamilton wrote the scripts for 52 half-hour episodes of the BBC television series Billy Bunter of Greyfriars School, broadcast over seven series between 1952 and 1961, including three specials. The show was centred around Bunter, with other characters in peripheral roles.

Billy Bunter was played by Gerald Campion. The series also featured Anthony Valentine as Harry Wharton, Michael Crawford as Frank Nugent, Jeremy Bulloch as Bob Cherry, Melvyn Hayes as Harold Skinner, John Woodnutt, Raf De La Torre, Kynaston Reeves and Jack Melford as Mr Quelch, Roger Delgado as Monsieur Charpentier and Kenneth Cope as school bully Gerald Loder.

The memorable theme music was the "Portsmouth" section of Ralph Vaughan Williams's Sea Songs. The episodes were transmitted live in black and white, and a dozen still exist in the BBC's archive as telerecordings (see Wiping), including the complete third series of six episodes, one of the specials, one episode from the fifth series, and four from the sixth series.

=== Stage ===
Billy Bunter appeared in several Christmas stage shows with different casts:

- 1958: Billy Bunter's Mystery Christmas (Palace Theatre, London)
- 1959: Billy Bunter Flies East (Victoria Palace Theatre)
- 1960: Billy Bunter's Swiss Roll (Victoria Palace Theatre)
- 1961: Billy Bunter Shipwrecked (Victoria Palace Theatre)
- 1962: Billy Bunter's Christmas Circus (Queen's Theatre)
- 1963: Billy Bunter Meets Magic (Shaftesbury Theatre)

=== Comics ===
After The Magnet closed in 1940, Bunter appeared in children's comics, as a strip cartoon character: initially, from 15 June 1940 in Knockout (which, like The Magnet, was published by The Amalgamated Press). Although Knockout had begun only in 1939, it already had a circulation several times that of The Magnet. C H Chapman, the last illustrator for The Magnet, drew the first nine Knockout strips in 1939, after which several artists were tried, before Frank Minnitt established himself with a beaming and bouncy Bunter, which at first followed Chapman's style, then later branched into a style of his own, concentrating on slapstick humour. Soon the Famous Five vanished from the strip, replaced by Jones minor, who had all the good qualities Bunter lacked, but who was prone to being led astray by Bunter. The form-master, Mr Quelch, stayed (at least in name), but he lost his dignity and aloofness. Minnitt continued producing the strip until his death in 1958. Reg Parlett then took over until Knockout ceased publication in 1961, when the strip transferred to Valiant comic, and then to TV Comic, where it ran until 1984. Bunter also appeared in many Knockout annuals, even on some covers.

C. H. Chapman drew a strip for The Comet comic in 1956, which featured the classical old Bunter of The Magnet and the Famous Five, consisting of twelve weeks of 2-page strips (24 pages in all). Altogether, Bunter's appearances in Comet lasted from March 1950 until June 1958, with picture stories from February 1952.

From 1955, Billy Bunter comic strips were published in the Netherlands, in the Dutch-language comic Sjors, with the character renamed "Billie Turf". Bunter thus became one of the house characters of that comic and its successors, and so continued appearing in anthology-style collections in Dutch until the end of the 20th century. "Billie Turf" comic strip albums were published from 1963 onwards, and have continued into the 21st century. Three Billie Turf movies were made by Henk van der Linden between 1978 and 1983, mostly spelling the name of the main character as "Billy Turf": Billy Turf het dikste studentje ter wereld (1978), Billy Turf Haantje de voorste (1981) and Billy Turf contra Kwel (1982).

=== Appearances in other fiction ===
- Billy Bunter appears in Alan Moore and Kevin O'Neill's graphic novel The League of Extraordinary Gentlemen: Black Dossier, and still resides at the now closed Greyfriars in 1958 as an old man. He sells information about the former students of the school, which is supposed to have been a recruiting ground for spies and agents for the crown since the 16th century. To avoid copyright issues, as the character was still under copyright, the graphic novel only refers to the character by his first name.
- Bunter appears in the Viz cartoon strip "Baxter Basics" (the title spoofing a slogan of the Conservative Party, "Back to Basics") as Sir William Bunter, Conservative MP for Greyfriars Central. The character was immediately killed off by Baxter, so that he could take over that Parliamentary seat.
- In Bunter Sahib by Daniel Green, Bunter's identical ancestor is placed in 19th-century India.
- David Hughes in But for Bunter creates the idea that the Greyfriars stories were based on real people, and set out to find them and hear their stories. Thus the Famous Five (Wharton, Nugent, Cherry, Bull and Singh) are, respectively, Anthony Eden, Frank Richards himself, Field-Marshal Montgomery, J.B.Priestley and Pandit Nehru. Lord Mauleverer is based on the Duke of Windsor, who did not realise this but completed the circle by making Mauleverer his role model. But for Bunter echoed the theme of a contemporary BBC radio documentary, Whatever Happened to... Henry Samuel Quelch.
- Cyril, a thinly veiled version of Billy Bunter, appears in the Doctor Who story "The Celestial Toymaker". As the character was still under copyright, a BBC continuity announcer was obliged to deny any deliberate similarity between the characters after the episodes aired.

== Bibliography ==
- Beal, George, ed. (1977), The Magnet Companion, London: Howard Baker.
- Cadogan, Mary (1988), Frank Richards: The Chap Behind The Chums, Middlesex: Viking.
- Fayne, Eric; Jenkins, Roger (1972), A History of The Magnet and The Gem, Kent: Museum Press.
- Hamilton Wright, Una; McCall, Peter (2006), The Far Side of Billy Bunter: the Biography of Charles Hamilton, London: Friars Library.
- Lofts, W.O.G.; Adley, D.J. (1975), The World of Frank Richards, London: Howard Baker.
- McCall, Peter (1982), The Greyfriars Guide, London: Howard Baker.
- Orwell, George (1940), "Boys Weeklies", Horizon, archived from the original on 19 December 2008.
- Richards, Frank (1940), "Frank Richards Replies to Orwell" (PDF), Horizon.
- Richards, Frank (1962), The Autobiography of Frank Richards, London: Skilton.
- Richards, Jeffery (1991), Happiest Days: Public Schools in English Fiction, Manchester: Manchester University Press.
- Sutton, Lawrence. (1980), Greyfriars for Grown-ups, London: Howard Baker.
- Turner, E.S. (1975), Boys will be Boys – 3rd edition, London: Penguin.
