= Charles Hamilton (writer) =

English writer of school stories (1876–1961)

- Charles Hamilton
- Born: Charles Harold St. John Hamilton; 8 August 1876; Ealing, Middlesex, England
- Died: 24 December 1961 (aged 85); Kingsgate, Kent, England
- Occupation: Author
- Writing career
- Notable work: Billy Bunter

Charles Harold St. John Hamilton (8 August 1876 – 24 December 1961) was an English writer, specialising in writing long-running series of stories for weekly magazines about recurrent casts of characters, his most frequent and famous genre being boys' public school stories, though he also wrote in other genres. He used a variety of pen-names, generally using a different name for each set of characters he wrote about, the most famous being Frank Richards for the Greyfriars School stories featuring Billy Bunter. Other important pen-names included Martin Clifford (for St Jim's), Owen Conquest (for Rookwood) and Ralph Redway (for The Rio Kid). He also wrote hundreds of stories under his real name such as the Ken King stories for The Modern Boy.

He is estimated to have written about 100 million words in his lifetime and has featured in the Guinness Book of Records as the world's most prolific author. Vast amounts of his output are available on the Friardale website.

== Working life ==
=== Early life and career (1876–1906) ===
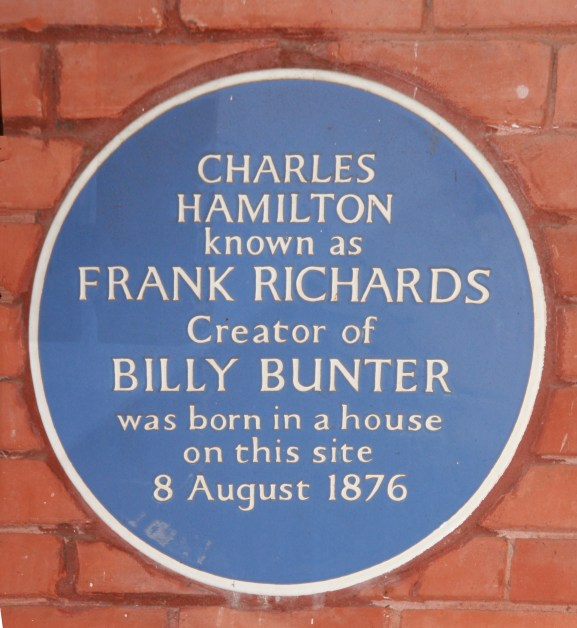
Plaque to Charles Hamilton at 15 Oak Street, Ealing, London W5, now the site of Ealing Broadway Shopping Centre

Hamilton was born in Ealing, London, one of the eight children of Mary Ann Hannah (née Trinder - born 1847) and John Hamilton (1839-1884), a master carpenter. Charles Hamilton was privately educated at Thorn House School in Ealing, where he studied Classical Greek among other subjects. He then embarked on a career as a writer of fiction, having his first story accepted almost immediately, appearing in 1895.

Over the following years he was to establish himself as the main writer with the publisher Trapps Holmes, providing several thousand stories on a range of subjects including police, detectives, firemen, Westerns as well as school stories. In 1906 he started to write for the Amalgamated Press and although he continued to have stories published for Trapps Holmes until 1915 (many of which were reprints), his allegiance was gradually to move.

=== Heyday (1907–1940) ===
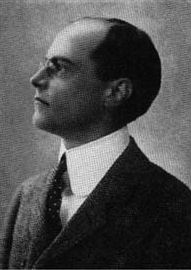
Hamilton in 1912

Amalgamated Press started a new story paper for boys called The Gem in 1907 and by issue number 11 it had established a format: the major content was to be a story about St Jim's school, starring Tom Merry as the main character and written by Charles Hamilton under the pen name of Martin Clifford. This paper rapidly established itself and, to capitalise on its success, a similar venture was launched in 1908. This was to be known as The Magnet. The subject matter was a school called Greyfriars and Hamilton was again to be the author, this time using the name Frank Richards.

In 1915 Hamilton started a third school series for Amalgamated Press, Rookwood, this time under the name Owen Conquest and featuring a leading character called Jimmy Silver. These appeared in the Boys' Friend Weekly, and were shorter than the Greyfriars and St Jim's stories.

These three schools absorbed most of Hamilton's energies over the following 30 years and constitute the work for which he is best remembered. In the early part of this period the St Jim's stories were more involved and more popular. The Greyfriars stories, however, evolved gradually over the early years of The Magnet, eventually becoming Hamilton's main priority. His "golden age" is generally regarded as lasting from about 1925 to about 1935. In all he provided stories for 82 per cent of the issues of The Magnet and two thirds of the issues of The Gem. If a Hamilton story was not available, the story was provided by another author but still using the Clifford or Richards name.

By the late 1930s the circulations of both The Gem and The Magnet had declined, partly because of competition from publications by D.C. Thomson. In December 1939 The Gem was cancelled, in the traditional manner of British comics, by being merged with another paper, the Triumph. There is reason to believe that the same fate would have overtaken The Magnet in the summer of 1940, but in the event a sudden shortage of paper, caused by the progress of the war, led to its ceasing publication abruptly and without notice in May that year. The final issue contained the opening story of a new series.

=== Later career (1940–1961) ===
Following the closure of The Magnet in 1940 Hamilton had little work, but he became known as the author of the stories following a newspaper interview he gave to the London Evening Standard. He was not able to continue the Greyfriars saga, as Amalgamated Press held the copyright and would not release it. He was obliged to create new schools such as Carcroft and Sparshott, as well as trying the romance genre under the name of Winston Cardew.

By 1946 Richards had received permission to write Greyfriars stories again, and obtained a contract from publishers Charles Skilton for a hardback series, the first volume of which, Billy Bunter of Greyfriars School, was published in September 1947. The series continued for the rest of his life, the publisher later changing to Cassells. In addition, he wrote further St Jim's, Rookwood and Cliff House stories, as well as the television scripts for seven series of Billy Bunter stories for the BBC.

Frank Richards died on 24 December 1961, aged 85, and was cremated at the Kent County Crematorium at Charing in Kent.

== Personal life ==
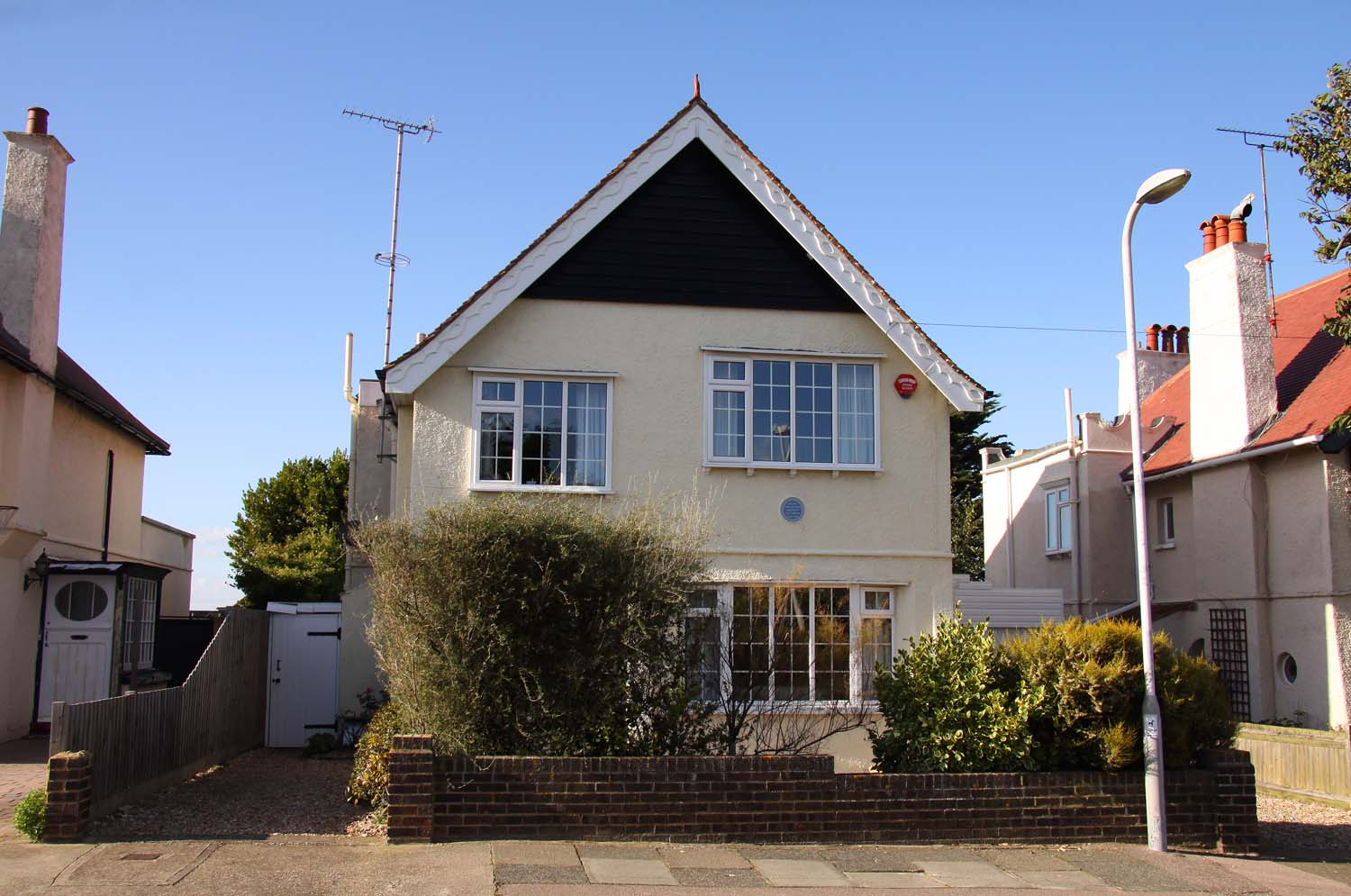
Rose Lawn, Kent

Hamilton never married, but some details of one romance are provided in a biography, and another is briefly mentioned in his autobiography. Early in the 20th century he was briefly engaged to a lady called Agnes, and later he formed a brief attachment to an American lady whom he alluded to as Miss New York.

His life interests were writing stories, studying Latin, Greek and modern languages, chess, music, and gambling, especially at Monte Carlo. The Roman poet Horace was a particular favourite. He travelled widely in Europe in his youth, but after 1926 he left England only to visit France. He lived in a small house called Rose Lawn, in Kingsgate, a hamlet in St Peter parish, now part of Broadstairs, Kent, where he was looked after by a housekeeper, Miss Edith Hood. She continued to reside in Rose Lawn following his death.

While Hamilton was reclusive in later years, he conducted a prolific correspondence with his readers. He generally wore a skull cap to conceal his hair loss and sometimes smoked a pipe.

He had a close relationship with his sister Una, her husband Percy Harrison and their daughter, Una Hamilton-Wright, who produced her own biography of Hamilton in 2006.

Portraits of Hamilton were painted by the artist Norman Kadish.

== Literary output ==
It has been estimated by the researchers Lofts and Adley that Hamilton wrote around 100 million words or the equivalent of 1,200 average-length novels, making him the most prolific author in history. He is known to have created over 100 schools that were the subjects of his stories as well as writing many non-school stories. More than 5,000 of his stories have been identified, of which 3,100 were reprinted.

=== Pen-names ===
At least 25 pen-names have been identified as having been used by Hamilton. These are listed below.

Pen-name	Publication(s)
Winston Cardew	Romance series
Martin Clifford	Popular; Pluck; Gem; Triumph; Boys Friend; Weekly; Schoolboys Own Library; Empire Library; Greyfriars Holiday Annual; Goldhawk Books
Harry Clifton	Chuckles
Clifford Clive	School and Sport
Sir Alan Cobham	Modern Boy
Owen Conquest	Popular; Boys Friend Weekly; Gem; Magnet; Schoolboys Own Library; B.F.L.; Greyfriars Herald; Greyfriars Holiday Annual; Knockout
Gordon Conway	Vanguard Library; Funny Cuts
Freeman Fox	Coloured Comic; Worlds Comic
Hamilton Greening	Funny Cuts
Cecil Herbert	Vanguard Library; Funny Cuts
Prosper Howard	Chuckles; Empire Library; B.F.L.
Robert Jennings	Picture Fun
Gillingham Jones	Picture Fun; Vanguard Library; Funny Cuts
Harcourt Lewelyn	Smiles
Clifford Owen	Diamond Library; Jacks Paper
Ralph Redway	Modern Boy; Ranger; Popular; B.F.L.
Riley Redway	Vanguard Library; Funny Cuts; Picture Fun; Smiles
Frank Richards	Popular; Dreadnought; Ranger; Gem; Magnet; Boys Friend Weekly; B.F.L.; Schoolboys Own Library; Chuckles; Greyfriars Holiday Annual; Knockout Fun Book; Tom Merry's Own; Billy Bunter's Own; Mascot Schoolboy Series; Sparshott Series; Wonder Book of Comics; Silver Jacket; and other post WWII publications
Hilda Richards	Schoolfriend
Raleigh Robins	Funny Cuts
Robert Rogers	Funny Cuts; Picture Fun
Eric Stanhope	Vanguard Library; Picture Fun
Robert Stanley	Vanguard Library; Best Budget; Funny Cuts; Larks
Nigel Wallace	Vanguard Library
Talbot Wynyard	Picture Fun

=== Style and content ===
Hamilton employed a lightly ironic voice, often studded with humorous classical references which had the effect of making the stories both accessible and erudite. In this respect, he has been compared to P. G. Wodehouse, who emerged from a similar period and was also a prolific author in a light-hearted genre. His extraordinary output has been suggested as arising from a very fluent style that came naturally to him and, in turn made the stories very readable, while at the same time being somewhat wordy.

Much of his popularity derives from his ability to allow the reader to participate vicariously in the ongoing adventure. As with many later children's writers, the stories centred on a small core group of characters who form a close knit unit – at St Jim's there was the Terrible Three, at Rookwood the Fistical Four and at Greyfriars, The Famous Five. Such groups, while being closed to other pupils, are implicitly open to readers who are subliminally invited to include themselves amongst their number, thereby establishing their involvement with the story.

The stories also uphold a moral code of honesty, generosity, respect and discipline, while condemning Hamilton's own weaknesses of smoking and gambling. There is also a strong message against racism in the inclusion of an Indian schoolboy, Hurree Singh, into the core group of the Famous Five in 1908, and by subsequently introducing a Jewish boy, Monty Newland, as a respected member of the Remove (the main form featured in the stories). Both of these 'foreign' characters personify 'British' values of honesty and sportsmanship, and were extremely popular with readers. This attitude did not extend to Africans, however, whom Hamilton describes in racist stereotypes.

Charles Hamilton was a keen gambler at continental casinos before the First World War. Although his stories always had a strong anti-gambling message, such conduct being described as 'sweepy' or 'shady', Hamilton often introduced gambling storylines, such as horserace betting or casinos, and warned of its compulsive dangers.

The moral message throughout is subtly tempered through comic characters, of whom Billy Bunter is the most famous. Bunter is the antithesis of everything the stories value: lazy, greedy, dishonest, and self-centred. However, he is tolerated because of his extreme incompetence and (usually) good nature and lack of malice. His absurd interventions deflate the high seriousness of authority figures, and frequently reduce their efforts to farce.

The public school is a world where adult supervision is light, allowing the juvenile characters to create a society of their own, and dare to adventure beyond the experience of the young readers. This formula became standard in juvenile fiction, though Hamilton's originality and technique were seldom equalled.

=== Substitute writers ===
During the 1910s Hamilton's input dropped during his frequent trips to the Continent and the gambling tables of Monte Carlo, and for about 20 years nearly 35 other authors wrote stories for publication under the pen names 'Martin Clifford' and 'Frank Richards'; these included Edwy Searles Brooks (1889–1965), Hedley Percival Angelo O'Mant (1899–1955), William Edward Stanton Hope (1889–1961), Julius Herman (1894–1955) John Nix Pentelow (1872–1931) and George Richmond Samways (1895–1996), the last writing nearly 100 Greyfriars stories among others. Hamilton disparagingly referred to this pool of substitutes as "the Menagerie". The last substitute-written story appeared in The Magnet in 1931; all subsequent stories were solely written by Hamilton.

== Criticism ==
Before World War II, all of Hamilton's writing was for weekly papers, produced on cheap paper and lacking any suggestion of permanence; it had nonetheless attracted a loyal following but, unsurprisingly, no critical attention from the mainstream media. However, there emerged in 1940 a privately printed publication called the Story Paper Collector. This was printed at irregular times in Canada until 1966 when the founder, originally from Croydon, England, died. It was distributed around the world and printed critical discussions and articles about the work of Charles Hamilton and other story paper writers. In November 1946 another magazine, the Collectors' Digest began. Created by Herbert Leckenby, and in due course edited by Eric Fayne and Mary Cadogan, it was to run at mostly monthly intervals until early 2005 (a last issue being published in 2007). Discussion and debates continued through internet based Groups.

A 1940 essay by George Orwell entitled "Boys' Weeklies" paid particular attention to Hamilton's work. Orwell suggested that the style was deliberately formulaic so that it could be copied by a panel of authors whom he supposed to lie behind the Frank Richards name. He denigrated the world of the stories as an outdated, snobbish, and right-wing fantasy, while conceding that Billy Bunter was a "really first-rate character". Hamilton's retort included his first public acknowledgement of himself as author:

In the presence of such authority, I speak with diffidence and can only say that, to the best of my knowledge and belief, I am only one person and have never been two or three.

and defended the wholesome comfort of the stories:

A boy of fifteen or sixteen is on the threshold of life: and life is a tough proposition; but will he be better prepared for it by telling him how tough it may possibly be? I am sure that the reverse is the case. . . . Happiness is the best preparation for misery, if misery must come. At least, the poor kid will have had something! He may, at twenty, be hunting for a job and not finding it—why should his fifteenth year be clouded by worrying about that in advance? . . . Even if making miserable children would make happy adults, it would not be justifiable. But the truth is that the adult will be all the more miserable if he was miserable as a child. Every day of happiness, illusory or otherwise—and most happiness is illusory—is so much to the good. It will help to give the boy confidence and hope. Frank Richards tells him that there are some splendid fellows in a world that is, after all, a decent sort of place. He likes to think himself like one of these fellows, and is happy in his daydreams. Mr Orwell would have him told that he is a shabby little blighter, his father an ill-used serf, his world a dirty, muddled, rotten sort of show. I don't think it would be fair play to take his twopence for telling him that!

Cultural historian Jeffrey Richards has written extensively about Hamilton's work, providing many examples of admirers, including John Arlott, Peter Cushing, Ted Willis and Benny Green. He says the works recall a world which contrasts with "the birth of an age which knew all about its rights but had forgotten its responsibilities".

== See also ==
- The Boys' Realm
- The Boys' Herald
- Pluck

== Bibliography ==
- Beal, George, ed. (1977), The Magnet Companion, London: Howard Baker.
- Cadogan, Mary (1988), Frank Richards - The Chap Behind the Chums, Middlesex: Viking.
- Fayne, Eric; Jenkins, Roger (1972), A History of The Magnet and The Gem, Kent: Museum Press.
- Hamilton Wright, Una; McCall, Peter (2006), The Far Side of Billy Bunter: The Biography of Charles Hamilton, London: Friars Library.
- Lofts, W.O.; Adley, D.J. (1970), The Men Behind Boys' Fiction, London: Howard Baker.
- Lofts, W.O.; Adley, D.J. (1975), The World of Frank Richards, London: Howard Baker.
- McCall, Peter (1982), The Greyfriars Guide, London: Howard Baker.
- Orwell, George (1940), "Boys' Weeklies", Horizon, archived from the original on 19 December 2008.
- Richards, Frank (1940), "Frank Richards Replies to Orwell" (PDF), Horizon.
- Richards, Frank (1962), The Autobiography of Frank Richards, London: Skilton.
- Richards, Jeffery (1991), Happiest Days: Public Schools in English Fiction, Manchester: Manchester University Press.
- Sell, Jonathan P.A. (2000), "The Nabob of Bhanipur Comes of Age: A Study of a Fictional Icon and Its Post-Colonial After-Life", Estudios Ingleses de la Universidad Complutense.
- Turner, E.S. (1975), Boys Will Be Boys (3rd edition), London: Penguin.
