= Robot Archie =

British comic book character

- Robot Archie in Lion Annual 1968.

Character information
- First appearance: Lion (23 February 1952)

In-story information
- Species: Robot
- Place of origin: Earth
- Partnerships: Ted Ritchie; Ken Dale
- Notable aliases: Tin-Ribs; Steel Bonce; Super-Archie

Publication information
- Publisher: Amalgamated Press (1952 to 1959); Fleetway Publications (1959 to 1969); IPC Magazines (1969 to 1983); Fleetway Publications (1990)
- Schedule: Weekly
- Title(s): Lion; 23 February to 9 August 1952; 19 January to 15 June 1957; 9 November 1957 to 6 March 1971; 24 March 1973 to 18 May 1974 Lion Annual; 1954, 1959 to 1980, 1982 to 1983; Lion Special; 1968, 1970, 1973 to 1976 and 1980; Lion and Valiant Special Extra; 1968 to 1970; Lion Picture Library #2, #4 and # 8 Valiant; 2 November to 7 December 1974; Vulcan Annual; 1977 Classic Action Holiday Special; 1990
- Formats: Original material for the series has been published as a strip in the comics anthology(s) Lion; Valiant.
- Genre: Action/adventure
- Publication date: 23 February 1952 – 7 December 1974

Creative team
- Writer(s): Ted Cowan; Mark Ross
- Artist(s): Alan Philpott; Ted Kearon

Robot Archie is a British comic character, appearing in strips published by Amalgamated Press, Fleetway Publications and IPC Magazines. Created by Ted Cowan, the character first appeared in a serial called "The Jungle Robot" in the first issue of Lion on 23 February 1952. While the initial stint only lasted six months, Archie returned 1957 and would become one of the most enduring characters in Lion, running until the comic merged with Valiant in 1974, with the majority of his adventures drawn by Ted Kearon.

Since then the character has enjoyed periodic revivals, most prominently as a guest character in Grant Morrison's 2000 AD story "Zenith" in 1989 and as a prominent figure in Alan Moore's Albion (2005-2006).

== Creation ==
Edward George 'Ted' Cowan already had extensive experience writing for boys' story papers and comics, notably penning the adventures of schoolboy Ginger Nutt for The Champion. The story featured remote control mechanical man Archie aiding 'chums' Ted Ritchie and Ken Dale in hunting treasure in an exotic location, a format previously used by William Ward for the "Iron Warrior" in the pages of Gerald G. Swan's Thrill between 1940 and 1945. The initial six-month serial was rendered by Alan Philpott. Steve Holland has suggested Archie may have been inspired by Klaatu from the 1951 science fiction film The Day the Earth Stood Still.

== Publishing history ==
"The Jungle Robot" concluded in the 9 August 1952 edition of Lion, after which the character went into limbo for nearly five years - though some have noted the resemblance of the robot in the 1955 strip "Flying Saucer Over Africa" to Archie. The strip itself returned to the weekly comic (having made a one-off appearance in the 1954 Lion Annual) on 19 January 1957 under the name "Archie the Robot", initially for another six months. It returned again in the 9 November edition, with Ted Kearon now as artist and Cowan returning as writer. This started a 17-year residency that would run until Lion itself folded into Valiant in May 1974. The character also became a fixture in Lion Annual and appeared in three issues of Lion Picture Library. Along the way, the serial was renamed "Robot Archie" from 9 May 1959, and in 1966 the robot received a voice-box and much greater independence - and a boastful personality that added humour to the stories. The strip also moved into more fantastical territory, notably in 1968 when the regulars received access to a rook-shaped time machine. The following year Robot Archie fought The Sludge, previously an antagonist in a separate 1965 Lion serial, also written by Cowan.

After the end of Lion the characters continued to make occasional returns. The strip returned for a six-week 'guest' appearance in Valiant in 1974, while "Robot Archie" continued to appear in Lion Annuals until the final such book, dated 1983 - though in later editions new Archie material consisted of prose stories, with picture strips being reprints.

Meanwhile the character was sold overseas with some success, appearing in France as Archie Le Merveilleux Robot ('The Marvellous Robot') and Archie l'homme d'acier ('Archie the Man of Steel'), in India and in the Netherlands as Archie de Man van Staal (also Archie the Man of Steel). The latter was particularly notable, as the strip was heavily redrawn by Bert Bus and serialised in Sjors between 1971 and 1974 before being collected in a series of albums. The Sjors material was in full colour and the art was updated, notably giving Ted and Ken a more contemporary look, both receiving collar-length hair and in Ken's case, a moustache. Archie meanwhile was coloured a bluish-silver, whereas colour material in Britain had shown the character to be red.

The Dutch strips would be used as the source for the character's appearances in the experimental all-reprint weekly Vulcan between 1975 and 1976 (published simultaneously in Germany as Kobra), translated back into English. Curiously no attempt to incorporate the updated look was made in the still-running Lion Special and Annual stories. These included an appearance in the 1980 Lion Holiday Special, where Robot Archie battled fellow Lion favourite The Spider. A parallel universe version, named Android Andy, was briefly featured in Alan Moore and Alan Davis' Captain Britain story "Jaspers' Warp".

Archie's next stop was a surprise appearance in the third arc of Grant Morrison's revisionist superhero story "Zenith" in the pages of 2000 AD, first appearing in Prog 627 (20 May 1989) as part of a multiversal crossover. This version of the character, redesigned by Steve Yeowell, was a member of the anarchist Black Flag team of an alternative Earth, and was obsessed with acid house and techno. Archie ending up sticking around as a supporting character, starting his own music career, until the strip ended in 1992. Robot Archie also appeared in the celebration revival "zzzenith.com" in the special Prog 2001 edition of 2000 AD, where Zenith explained that rust in the brain-pan had caused Archie's personality to switch from raver to vigilante, hunting down sex offenders with a lethal vigour, and escaped on a bus wearing a false beard after sexually assaulting pop star Britney Spears.

In 1990 a more traditional appearance had come when a new "Robot Archie" strip appeared in the one-off Classic Action Holiday Special, alongside new adventures for Johnny Cougar, Jet-Ace Logan, Captain Hurricane, The Steel Claw and Janus Stark. The rights to Robot Archie were among those leased to WildStorm from IPC Magazines in 2005, and the character made prominent appearances in the limited series Albion where he was found in the basement of a Manchester pub by Penny Dolmann (the daughter of Eric Dolmann), who repaired and modified him in order to rescue her father. Archie was destroyed providing a distraction while Penny, Danny and Charlie Peace triggered a jailbreak. There were plans to create a fan-made website devoted to Robot Archie, but these seem to have never reached fruition. The character was also the inspiration for Tom Tom the Robot Man in Paul Grist's creator-owned series Jack Staff.

Since 2018 the rights to Robot Archie have been owned by Rebellion Developments. The character made a brief appearance in The Vigilant as a member of a previous incarnation of the title team that fell in battle.

=== Collected editions ===
In May 2024, Rebellion started publishing collections of original comics strips, as part of the Treasury of British Comics imprint.

A limited edition hardback edition was available exclusively from the 2000 AD / Treasury of British Comics webstores.

Title	ISBN (pb)	ISBN (hb)	Release date	Originally Serialised
Robot Archie and the Time Machine	9781837861699	9781837862443	22 May 2024	Robot Archie's Time Machine: Lion, 20 April 1968 - 29 June 1968 The Superon: Lion, 6 July 1968 - 2 November 1968 Time Traveller: Lion, 9 November 1968 - 11 January 1969 Robot Archie: Lion & Valiant Special Extra! 1969 Robot Archie: Lion Summer Special 1970

== Plot summary ==
On an expedition to search for treasure in M'Lassa, Ted Ritchie and his friend Ken Dale are provided with the powerful remote-control robot Archie to aid them on their journey. The mechanical man is a new invention of Ted's uncle, Professor C.R. Ritchie. Archie soon proved a valuable aid in battling tribesmen such as the villainous Pugg and Umbala. Later, he was also highly useful in thwarting Karanga natives Krang and Ngo's attempts to kill Ted and Ken when they returned to the continent to search Leopard Valley for uranium. Ted and Ken then volunteered themselves and Archie to retrieve a jewelled sphinx for explorer friend Frank Warren, despite the attentions of the enigmatic Veiled Arab. Their next destination was Devil-Fire Island in the South Seas, outwitting pirates Dagusta and Patch-Eye to retrieve a giant diamond.

A trip to East Kilibu to film a ceremony saw Robot Archie save the life of the Rajah of Zorba, who promptly hired the trio to protect him against further threats. After defeating the treacherous would-be assassin Yogini, Archie was knighted by the Rajah. The pals then returned to Africa to end the ivory poaching of the cruel Drago and fended off the attempts of evil witch doctor Warogi to halt construction on a railroad.

Their next destination was Bandaray in South America, where they saved their friend Gary Bracknel's rubber plantation from falling to rebels. Later they investigated a river of gold, but found themselves in competition with Brendon and Klaus, who had their own remote-controlled robot, Orion. However, Robot Archie eventually destroyed Orion in combat. They then travelled to Las Piedras, New Mexico and thwarted the Iron Mask Bandits' attempt to rob a gold bullion train. A return to Africa saw them discover a lost city, despite the underhand tactics of rivals Maley and Brindo.

In North Africa they helped overthrow a cruel Sultan before travelling back again to South America, discovering a lost Inca city in Peru and preventing thieves Zamito and Trask from making off with treasure from a wrecked Spanish galleon. Later they planned to carry out filming in Indo-China and learnt of a huge fire-breathing crab destroying local boats. The trio discovered it was a mechanical device operated by crooks, and the 'crab' was smashed by Robot Archie. On a tour of islands in the Eastern Pacific they stumbled on a group of amoral scientists planning to disrupt the planet's weather, but Archie was able to destroy their rockets. Their next expedition took them back to Africa when friend Bill Drayton asked them for help with the Scorpion, a local warlord who was forcing the inventor to build rocket belts. They were able to defeat him and Archie delivered the bound miscreant to the local Emir. A journey to the Arabian peninsula brought them into conflict with Abdul Kra's pirates, who were terrorising the people of El Berrek. Archie was again able to deliver the villain to the authorities.

A return to South America to search for an abandoned gold mine in El Dorado saw Ted, Ken and Archie stumble across and thwart a group of gun-runners. A visit to friend Dan Tu's rubber plantation in Sujana followed, where they discovered the island seemed to be under attack by strange monsters. They found out that the monsters were mechanical in nature and ran by a group of racketeers. Ted and Ken then volunteered Archie as test pilot for an experimental jet but both the aircraft and Archie fell under the control of the sinister Doctor X, who diverted them to his island. Archie's chums were able to regain control over him and destroyed X's island.

The trio visited Paris, which was promptly targeted by thieves Salanda and Zicco and their Mole drilling tank, eventually tracing the pair to their houseboat; while the two criminals escaped, Archie saw they weren't able to keep their loot. The Mole Men switched their activities to New York, but were again defeated by Robot Archie - and this time captured. Returning to Europe, they foiled a gang of Italian bullion thieves led by Branda. Ted, Ken and Archie returned to the East when photographer pal Don Trent asked for their help in Burma in dealing with the Screaming Beetle, a flying jet hovercraft under the control of a criminal called Kelso. Archie was able to wreck the vehicle. Next stop was a return to South America, where the alien-created mechanical brain Cephus had created an army of gold robots. The aliens' plan to colonise Earth was abandoned after Archie destroyed Cephus and his minions.

Archie was fitted with a new automatic mode, during which he also gained the ability to speak. A visit to the Coral Islands and soon found themselves investigating a ghost ship and soon found it to be a ruse undertaken by Doctor Fang and his army of crocodile skin-clad minions. Exploring the North African desert was the team's next adventure. They stumbled across a scheme pair called Venner and Tragg, who were using a salvaged World War II German tank into a mechanical scorpion to terrorise the locals.

They were subsequently called to Eastern Asia by Professor Pavey who lent them his earth-boring Gimlet to help them get to the bottom of mysterious sightings of a 'White Diamond Fiend', which turned out to be controlled by deposed dictator Megala to drive people away from a lost valley he was making his own kingdom. Archie was able to destroy the computer controlling the diamond-men after riding into battle on the back of a dinosaur. Pavey had in the meantime travelled to Porto Vendo in South America, and while returning the Gimlet they came under attack by a colony of bats sent by the self-proclaimed Lord of the Bats, who they captured. The pals were called to Moga in the Pacific by their old friend Doctor Bailey, who had built a duplicate of Archie called Gus, only for the latter to fall under the control of criminals Riller and Snell. Archie bested Gus in combat and his masters were captured, though the nefarious doppelganger was able to escape.

For their next adventure they chose Lebadan in Africa, but a young lost boy called Tom Chance to his guardian, only for the lad to get kidnapped. They were eventually able to recover and deliver him. They made a return to London and are hailed as heroes, but soon stumbled across a criminal organisation led by the Chief Ferret. As such they were hired to provide security against the villain at the Wide World Exhibition, and eventually brought down the Chief Ferret's plans. Archie's success was such that he took to referring to himself as 'Super-Archie'; to take him down a peg or two Ted and Ken attempted to create a second robot, but an accident led to the new creation being the diminutive Junior, who turned out to be even more mischievous. After rescuing Junior from a gang of crooks, the trio were able to enrol the newcomer into a school where he could learn to behave himself.

Archie himself got in on the invention game, working with Professor Ritchie to create a time machine shaped like a giant chess rook called The Castle. The trio soon found themselves careering through history, battling the cruel Hugo the Black Wolf in the 14th century, freeing a future version of London from the rule of the Superons, defeating crooked 18th century magistrate Sir Jeremiah Creefe, and saved the future from invasion by the Krulls.

The Castle returned to the 20th century, returning just in time to thwart the present-day Krull invasion of Earth. Their next trip took them to World War I, where Archie ended up capturing a German destroyer. A trip to the Wild West saw Archie, Ken and Ted prevent a needless battle between United States Cavalry and Comanche braves.

Next their travels brought them into contact with the jelly-like monster the Sludge, which had taken over a secluded island. They seemingly defeated the creature and freed the people of the island, but part of the glob attached itself to The Castle and followed them back to Britain. Archie was finally able to coax the creature into mineral deposits which destroyed it. The pals then went back to the Indian North West frontier and fought the Pathans of Jabal Khan, destroying their mechanical Death Lizard. A return to exploration and an expedition to the lost Golden City of Saleka, freeing it from the influence of a mysterious crystal. Archie, Ted and Ken helped investigate the disappearance of the research vessel Intrepid, defeating culprit Ulrich Von Schtorm and his army of robots. They also defeated the menacing Smasher and his giant robot. They later rescued naturist John Milson from a race of giant cacti.

== Reception ==
Mike Conroy included the character in his book of 500 Great Comicbook Action Heroes in 2002.

Many older "Robot Archie" strips have been criticised for their depiction of Ted and Ken as white saviours, and the strip's attitude towards native Africans and Asians as displaying colonialism. As early of 1992, Lew Stringer noted "Why this African treasure should belong to two white Englishmen was a moral point never raised", and called the frequent hostility to the trio shown by natives as "understandable". On more than one occasion the robot is acclaimed as a god by a primitive tribe. A write-up on the character on rights' holder Rebellion's Treasury of British Comics website written by David McDonald was prefaced with the advisory warning " some of the images on this post contain offensive and outdated stereotypes, and are included for the purposes of historical interest".
