= Mytek the Mighty =

British comic book story

- Mytek the Mighty on the cover of the 21 February 1976 issue of Vulcan, art by Eric Bradbury.

Character information
- First appearance: Valiant (28 September 1964)

In-story information
- Species: Robot
- Partnerships: Gogra; Professor Arnold Boyce; Dirk Mason

Publication information
- Publisher: Fleetway Publications; IPC Magazines; Rebellion Developments
- Schedule: Weekly
- Title(s): Valiant; 26 September 1964 to 24 February 1968; 8 June 1968 to 31 January 1970; Valiant Summer Special; 1967; Valiant Space Special; 1968; 2000 AD Action Special; 1992; Smash! Special; 2020
- Formats: Original material for the series has been published as a strip in the comics anthology(s) Valiant; Vulcan.
- Genre: Action/adventure
- Publication date: 26 September 1964 – 31 January 1970

Creative team
- Writer(s): Tom Tully
- Artist(s): Eric Bradbury; Bill Lacey

"Mytek the Mighty" is a British comic adventure strip, appearing in titles published by Fleetway Publications. The story revolves around Mytek, a large and powerful robotic ape. The strip first appeared in the boys' anthology title Valiant on 26 September 1964. The story was written by Tom Tully and initially drawn by Eric Bradbury, with Bill Lacey later taking over.

== Creation ==
Since Valiant's inception the off-beat adventures of the Steel Claw had been popular with readers, and the addition of "Kelly's Eye" after Knockout was merged into the title proved a similar success. By 1963, both were being written by Tom Tully, a relatively new arrival who, as a freelancer, was also working on "Heros the Spartan" in Eagle, then published by Fleetway Publications' rival Odhams Press. Nevertheless Tully soon took on further work for Valiant, adding off-beat athletic story "The Wild Wonders" to his workload in March 1964, and then "Mytek the Mighty" from September 1964. For the latter he was paired with Eric Bradbury, who had been drawing for Fleetway and predecessor Amalgamated Press since 1950. For "Mytek the Mighty" Bradbury adapted a darker style, influenced by the work of Spanish artists working on other Valiant strips such as Jesús Blasco and Francisco Solano López.

== Publishing history ==
"Mytek the Mighty" first appeared in the 26 September 1964 edition of Valiant, and soon proved popular with readers. The strip would eventually run until January 1970 before being replaced by "College Cowboy". Bradbury illustrated "Mytek the Mighty" until 1966, when he began work on another Tully-written story in Valiant, "The House of Dolmann". His replacement was Bill Lacey, who had extensive experience on Fleetway's line of Picture Library titles, as well as drawing "The Sludge" for Lion. The strip originally ended in February 1968, but returned in June.

Like many Fleetway strips of the time, "Mytek the Mighty" was sold to overseas publishers for syndication. French publisher Éditions de l'Occident had particular success assembling the Valiant serials into small-format albums, with 16 being produced between April 1972 and October 1974 and a second run of reprints from January 1977 to May 1978, published by Mon Journal. For these, the series was retitled King Kong despite being unrelated to the famous film simian. The same editions were also translated into Swedish by Semic Press and Spanish by Vertice and later Surco. The strips were printed again in English in 1975 as part of the small-size reprint series Vulcan, now rendered in colour; the same comic was also produced simultaneously in a re-lettered German version under the name Kobra. This only lasted until 1976, when the comic was merged with Valiant to form Valiant and Vulcan; this took the format of a short-lived small mini-comic attached to the staples of the parent comic, featuring edited conclusions to the stories running when Vulcan had cancelled, with the first wrapping up the "Mytek the Mighty" reprints.

The character was briefly revived in 1992 for the 2000 AD Action Special, a one-shot featuring various classic British comics characters reimagined by 2000 AD creators. The update to Mytek was written by Si Spencer and drawn by Shaky Kane. Any chances of further such revivals were nixed when editorial staff belatedly realised that the character was not among those purchased from IPC by Egmont Publishing when they took over the former IPC titles that were still being published in 1987. Instead Mytek had to wait for 2005 before another revival, when the characters still held by IPC were licensed by TimeWarner and appeared in the WildStorm mini-series Albion. Both Gogra and a mainly inert Mytek appeared in the story, with the Spider killing Gogra, stealing Mytek, stomping warden Captain Hurricane and leading a mass-breakout in the closing stages of the series.

In 2018 the rights to Mytek and other comics still owned by IPC were purchased by Rebellion Developments. In 2020 a new 11-page "Mytek the Mighty" story was featured in the 2020 Smash! Special, written by Suyi Davies Okungbowa and drawn by Anand Radhakrishnan. The creative team was chosen by Rebellion editor Keith Richardson to address the robot's problematic origin.

== Plot summary ==
The violent Akari tribe are roaming through Central Africa attacking other tribes, and destroying the research laboratory of Professor Arnold Boyce in the process. After learning from gamekeeper Dirk Mason that the Akari worship a giant ape-god called Mytek, Boyce has a giant robot version built to quell the Akari rampage. However, while the robot is tested Boyce's bitter dwarf assistant Gogra quickly becomes obsessed with it, attacks the professor and takes control of Mytek himself. He sets out to use the giant robot to conquer Africa, pursued by Boyce and Mason. Due to the robot's bulletproof exterior and solar charging cells, Gogra proves difficult to stop, especially as its electronic brain allows it to act semi-independently. With some effort, Mytek is driven out to sea after Gogra is knocked unconscious at the controls. However, both Gogra and Mytek survived and resurfaced in Greece. Mason and Boyce were recruited to lead the European powers' efforts to stop the evil dwarf. Gogra meanwhile enslaved a number of civilians and made them construct a robot even larger than Mytek, called Tyron. The result was unsuccessful and instead he took Mytek to attack England so he could kidnap Boyce and force him to complete the new robot. After taking numerous hostages, Gogra broadcast an ultimatum to the government demanding Boyce. However, Mason and Boyce were able to electrocute Mytek, burning out his circuits and forcing Gogra to bail out. While taken into custody, Gogra was able to escape and recover plans for Mytek's brain that allowed him to complete his work, while Mytek's brain reactivates and sends it on an unpiloted destructive spree - heading to get revenge on Gogra. It makes allies with Boyce and Dirk, and together they are able to destroy Tyron, leaving Mytek acclaimed as a hero.

Nevertheless many question the wisdom of keeping Mytek functional in case the robot again falls into the wrong hands. Nevertheless the robot proved itself when a race of aliens attempted to invade Earth with an army of gigantic robots, though Boyce and Mason subsequently sent Mytek to roam in the mountains of Africa for its own safety. However, his peaceful new existence was disturbed when Gogra resurfaced, created giant mechanical extremities and allied with the Akari. He disabled Mytek, leaving Boyce in a race against time to rebuild Mytek's brain, as Gogra's plan was to gradually build a huge robot version of himself he names Gogriath. After several false starts with Mytek's programming and numerous clashes around the world, Gograith is finally defeated when Boyce uses his knowledge of the robot's brain to make it turn on Gogra and destroy itself.

Mytek was overhauled before being called into action to battle microscopic entities accidentally enlarged after being exposed to radioactive material by well-meaning researcher Hilary Tarquin. Gogra returned to threaten civilisation once again with an army of pygmies and a huge robotic rhino he christened Rahgon, but was again defeated. The villain's next gambit of taking over the world with living weed was no less successful. Mytek, Mason and Boyce were then called to the otherwise-uninhabited Pacific island of Cyclax, where a damaged nuclear device had enlarged the insect population. Their next mission involved rescuing astronauts stranded on an exploratory mission to Umbra. After Mytek was modified to be space-capable, they were not only able to retrieve the spacemen but also free the planet's population from enslavement. Boyce's bitter rival Doctor Vilion attempted to have Mytek destroyed on return after claiming it had been contaminated on Umbra, but Boyce and Mason were able to prove this was unnecessary and the giant robot ape was once again free to roam Africa in peace.

== Reception ==
While the story was bemoaned in 1965 by the Scottish Academic Press for its violence, "Mytek the Mighty" was described by Lew Stringer as "the greatest of all the monster strips", singling out the battle between Mytek and the giant Gogra robot as a highlight. Mytek has been compared to King Kong.

The origin of the character has been criticised for displaying a colonialist attitude towards Africa, notably by the Smash! 2020 Special revival writer Suyi Davies Okungbowa.
