= List of Valiant stories =

A list of stories published in the Fleetway Publications/IPC weekly boys' comic Valiant between 1962 and 1976.

== Adam Eterno ==
Published: 25 May 1974 to 16 October 1976

After quaffing the Elixir of Life, Adam Eterno is doomed to immortality and drifts through time trying to find a solid gold weapon that can kill him.

- Inherited from Lion.

== The Astounding Jason Hyde ==
Published: 15 May 1965 to 11 May 1968
Writer: Barrington J. Bayley
Illustrator: Eric Bradbury

After being exposed to experimental radiation, scientist Jason Hyde's eyes emit x-ray beams that allow him to see through objects and read minds, abilities he puts towards fighting crime.

- Text story. The entire run of The Astounding Jason Hyde was collected in a trade paperback by Rebellion Developments in 2022.

== Banger and Masher ==
Published: 4 July 1970 to 3 July 1971
Artists: Ken Reid, Frank McDiarmid

Rival tearaways Banger and Masher one-up each other.

- Cartoon strip.

== Battler Britton ==
Published: 4 May to 21 September 1963

The adventures of a World War II British fighter ace.

- Continued reprints (of Thriller Picture Library) from Knockout. Battler Britton also appeared as a guest character in "Captain Hurricane" between 23 February to 9 March 1963.

== The Big Shot ==
Published: 3 August to 21 September 1963
Artist: Harry Winslade (as Redvers Blake)

Gang boss Nero Cortez unleashes a crime wave on London.

== Billy Bunter ==
Published: 23 February 1963 to 16 October 1976
Writer: Ron Clark
Artists: Albert Pease, Reg Parlett

Plus-sized public schoolboy Billy Bunter engages in numerous attempts to extort small sums of money to spend at the Greyfriars School tuck shop.

- Continued adventures of the long-established heavyweight chump from Knockout. Originally a print character, Billy Bunter appeared in a wide range of media before and after the strip in Valiant, including a controversial live-action revival featuring Bunter as the adulterous Mayor of London and - briefly - Prime Minister of Great Britain.

== The Black Crow ==
Published: 25 September to 16 October 1976
Artist: Eric Bradbury

Codenamed The Black Crow, a British secret agent carries out perilous missions in German-held Europe while Gestapo officer Major Klaus von Steutsel attempts to stop him.

- The last new story to debut in Valiant, "The Black Crow" continued after the merger with Battle Picture Weekly.

== Blade of the Frontier ==
Published: 6 October 1962 to 16 February 1963
Artist: Fred Holmes, Carlos Gabriel Roume

Khyber lancer Captain Brett Blade and his unit keep order from the desert stronghold of Fort Karam.

== Bluebottle and Basher ==
Published: 2 March 1968 to 16 May 1970
Writer and Artist: Leo Baxendale

Burglar Basher clashes with arch-enemy PC Bluebottle.

- Cartoon strip.

== The Boy Who Went To War ==
Published: 26 April to 18 October 1975
Artist: Félix Carrión

Underage poacher Danny Dougan forges his age to join the British Army in World War II. His outdoorsman skills soon make him invaluable in fighting Germans in Crete.

== Brain Drayne ==
Published: 30 December 1972 to 17 November 1973

Would-be inventor Private "Brain" Drayne tries to come up with numerous secret weapons for the army with fellow squaddies Ben Bonkers and Dan Dimm, much to the annoyance of platoon NCO Sgt. Slaughter.

- Cartoon strip, reprints from Buster.

== The Bungle Brothers ==
Published: 18 November 1972 to 10 March 1973

A man's idiot brother complicates his life.

- Cartoon strip, reprints from Buster.

== Captain Hurricane ==
Published: 6 October 1962 – 16 October 1976
Writers: Scott Goodall, Angus Allan, Gil Page, George Beal
Artists: R. Charles Roylance, Fred Holmes, Eric Bradbury, Tom Kerr, Alberto Giolitti, Jack Pamby

After his ship is sunk by a U-Boat, Hercules Hurricane becomes so furious at the mere mention of Germans that he flies into an unstoppable "ragin' fury". The Royal Marines soon see the use in this ability, and point Hurricane at various Axis formations. He is accompanied by his former first mate and reluctant adjutant "Maggot" Malone.

== Challenge Charlie! ==
Published: 25 May 1974 to 16 October 1976
Artists: Ken Reid, Frank McDairmid

Game lad Charlie attempts various labours.

- Cartoon strip. Charlie's challenges were submitted by readers; those who had their idea used were rewarded with £5.

== Chris Carron ==
Published: 1 February to 29 May 1969
Artist: John Stokes

Troubleshooter for hire Chris Carron takes jobs in South America.

- Modified reprints of "Crisis Carson" from Tiger.

== College Cowboy ==
Published: 7 February 1970 to 27 March 1971

Nigel Carfax-Carruthers enrols at the prestigious Kenelm College as a condition for receiving his inheritance. However, the faculty are stunned when the new pupil insists on being referred to as Tex, having been raised on a Texas ranch. His cowboy ways are popular with his peers, but troublesome for the staff.

== The Crows ==
Published: 6 October 1962 to 9 October 1976
Writer: Reg Orlandini
Artist: Reg Parlett

A family of talking crows.

- Cartoon strip.

== Danny Doom ==
Published: 25 May 1974 to 22 March 1975
Artist: Eric Bradbury, Fred Holmes

Apprentice to the 13th century sorcerer Astorath, young Danny Doom is catapulted forward to the present day when an experiment misfires, getting help from a girl called Carol.

- The presence of a female character was rare for a British boys' comic strip of the time. The character was later given a lead role in Albion, which made him the son of previously unrelated magician Cursitor Doom. A more traditional version of Danny made a brief cameo in The Vigilant.

== Death Wish ==
Published: 20 December 1975 to 18 September 1976
Artist: Mike Western, Ian Gibson

The sole survivor of his nine-man unit, British Army Sergeant Bannon becomes obsessed with driving German forces out of Italy, no matter the risk to himself.

== The Duke of Dry Gulch ==
Published: 28 September 1963 to 21 March 1964
Writer: Tom Tully
Artist: Mike Western

Captain Basil de Moncalf arrives in Carsonville to claim his inheritance of the ranch at Dry Ranch, but the scoffing locals soon find out the English aristocrat has the chops to make it in the Wild West.

- The character was a childhood favourite of The Independent columnist John Walsh.

== The Fateful Journey ==
Published: 19 to 26 February 1966
Artist: Boixcar

With Earth devastated by a series of wars, in 2956 a crew of survivors set out to find a new home.

- Modified reprint from El Mundo Futuro.

== Fort Navajo ==
Published:: 15 May to October 1965
Writer: Jean-Michel Charlier
Artist: Jean Giraud

Brothers Craig and Mike Blueberry join the United States Cavalry during the Indian Wars.

- Modified reprints of "Fort Navajo" from Pilote.

== Gabby McGlew ==
Published: 15 May 1965 to 4 January 1969
Artist: Angel Nadal

A small-scale spiv tells tall tales to shift his wares.

- Cartoon strip. Modified reprints of "Blarny Bluffer" from Knockout.

== The Ghostly Guardian ==
Published: 23 May 1970 to 25 September 1971
Writer: Tom Tully
Artist: Julio Schiaffino

Boy Jim Frobisher and his dog Trap set up in the family's ancestral home in Cornwall, and soon makes fast friends with ghost of ancestor Firebrand Frobisher and his amiable spirit friends Captain Keelhaul and One-Eyed Jake.

- One-Eyed Jake is no relation to "One-Eyed Jack".

== Hawk Hunter and the Iron Horse ==
Published: 6 October 1962 to 27 April 1963
Artists: Bill Lacey, Mike Western

The skills 17-year old Hawk Hunter has picked up from living among Native Americans all his life, General Dodge of Union Pacific Railroad hires the lad to defend his trains from the likes of gangster Mick Mulroon.

== His Sporting Lordship ==
Published: 10 April to 25 December 1971
Writer: Fred Baker
Artist: Douglas Maxted

Navvy Henry Nobbins is surprised to find out he is the heir to the Earlship of Ranworth. However, he has to carry out a set of sporting tasks before he can collect the title and ancestral home Plonkton Castle. His task is further complicated by local businessman Mr. Parkinson and his thug Fred Bloggs, who hope to turn the castle into a glue factory. In order to stave this off, Butler Jarvis and other staff from Plonkton help Nobbins in his endeavours.

- Continued from Smash!. Created by Barrie Mitchell.

== The House of Dolmann ==
Published:: 29 October 1966 to 11 April 1970, 7 September to 26 October 1974
Writer: Tom Tully
Artist: Eric Bradbury, Carlos Cruz, Reg Bunn, Geoff Campion

Genius Eric Dolmann creates a miniature army of robots to help him fight crime.

== Humbert Higgs, the Gentle Giant ==
Published: 23 May to 3 October 1970

Backwards hick Humbert Higgs try to make it as a boxer.

== Hymer Loafer ==
Published: 6 September 1969 to 10 June 1972
Artist: Angel Nadal

Tennessee frontiersman Hymer Loafer's attempts to bunk off for a nap are constantly frustrated.

- Cartoon strip. Modified reprints of "Lazy Sprockett" from Buster.

== The Incredible Adventures of Janus Stark ==
Published: 10 April 1971 to 18 May 1974, 8 to 23 March 1975
Writers: Tom Tully, Scott Goodall, Gil Page, Stewart Wales, Angus Allan
Artist: Francisco Solano López, Félix Carrión

Rubber-limbed Victorian-era escapologist Janus Stark wows Music Hall audiences and solves crimes.

- Continued from Smash!.

== The Ironmaster ==
Published: 2 March to 1 June 1968
Artist: Bill Lacey

Loveable East End rogue Danny Ventor finds an old helmet and sword he plans to sell for scrap until being electrocuted by a live rail. Instead the items transform him into the metal-controlling superhero Ironmaster, soon finding himself opposed by criminal The Mask.

== It's a Dog's Life ==
Published: 11 April 1964 to 19 April 1967
Artist: Jean Roba

The adventures of young boy Pete and his dog Larry.

- Cartoon strip. Modified reprints of "Boule et Bill" from Spirou.

== Jack Justice ==
Published:: 25 June 1966 to 20 May 1967
Artist: Tom Kerr

Great-great-great-grandson of the heroic highwayman Jack O' Justice, Jack Justice and his partner Diana Dauntless help modern-day police solve crimes.

== Jack o' Justice ==
Published:: 6 October 1962 to 18 June 1966
Artists: Hugh McNeill, Geoff Campion, John McNamara, Jack Pamby, Mike Western, Tom Kerr

Philanthropic highwayman Jack o' Justice and his partner Moll Moonlight right wrongs.

- Initially reprints of "Dick Turpin" from Sun before new material was created to continue the serial. Moll Moonlight retained her name from the original material, for which she had been created as a female foil for Turpin by Sun team Leonard Matthews, Mike Butterworth, David Motton and McNeill. As a rare female character in Valiant, Moonlight is well-remembered.

== Jackaroo Joe ==
Published: 30 October 1965 to 1 October 1966
Writer: Angus Allan
Artist: Mike White

Australian Joe Macallister begins a journey to Scotland to claim his title as Laird of Glenawe, travelling on the back of his kangaroo Oscar.

== Joe's Transport Cafe ==
Published: 1 July 1972 to 23 December 1972
Artist: John Mortimer

- Cartoon strip, reprints from Buster.

== Kelly's Eye ==
Published:: 23 February 1963 to 18 May 1974
Artists: Francisco Solano López, Tom Kerr

Tim Kelly discovers the Eye of Zoltec, which grants him the power of indestructibility.

- Continued from Knockout.

== Kid Gloves ==
Published: 6 October 1962 to 19 September 1964
Writer: Ron Clarke
Artists: Geoff Campion, Eric Bradbury

"Gentle giant" Kid Gloves tries to launch a boxing career.

== Kid Pharaoh ==
Published: 13 May 1972 to 6 December 1975
Artist: Francisco Solano López, Julio Schiaffino, Geoff Campion

Pharaoh Zethi is cursed into a deep sleep by his treacherous high priest Thothek. Awakening in the present day, he goes into Greco-Roman wrestling as "Kid Pharaoh", and soon comes to believe aristocrat Baron Munsen is Thothek reincarnated.

== The Kidnapped Planets ==
Published: 20 November to 4 December 1965
Artist: Boixcar

Space police officers Mark Delaney and Ryal set out to stop the planet-thieving antics of alien Razon.

- Modified reprint from El Mundo Futuro.

== Kraken ==
Published: 23 February 1963 to 19 September 1964

Professor Kraken makes several attempts to resurrect dinosaurs, opposed by rival Professor Needler.

- Continued from Knockout.

== Laird of Lazy Q ==
Published: 27 May to 9 September 1967

Scot Duncan MacGregor travels to Kansas to claim his inheritance of the Lazy Q ranch.

- Modified reprints of "McTavish of Red Rock" from Knockout.

== The Last Boys in the World ==
Published: 30 April 1966 to 20 May 1967
Artists: Selby Dennison, Bill Lacey

All of the world's population disappears apart from schoolboys Bill Marlowe, Steve Stephens and Chris Blake and their science master Mr. Watts, thanks to them being in possession of a strange metal called deleranium. Together, the group try to find out where everyone has gone.

== Legge's Eleven ==
Published: 26 September 1964 to 24 February 1968
Writer: Fred Baker
Artist: Douglas Maxted

Given a free transfer by First Division side Highwood Athletic, seven-foot misfit Ted Legge finds the only offer on the table is to become player-manager of Fourth Division Rockley Rovers. The unorthodox inside forward's first challenge is to get 11 players together. His signings included monocle-wearing Sir Darcy Lozenge, obese goalkeeper Tubby Mann, hirsute Scot Angus MacFee, French dandy Pierre Gaspard, winger 'Nipper' Norton and twin fullbacks Ron and Les Tearaway.

== Little Fred and Big Ed ==
Published: 16 November 1963 to 4 April 1964
Writer: René Goscinny
Artist: Albert Uderzo

As the Roman conquest of Britain progresses in 43 A.D., the brave Britons of the surrounded village Nevergivup refuse to fold to the invaders, their efforts spearheaded by wily Fred and his musclebound, rotund companion Ed.

- Modified black-and-white reprints of "Asterix" from Pilote. The strip's name was later shortened to "Little Fred". A second attempt to relocate Asterix followed later in 1964 in the pages of Ranger, where the strip was modified again as "Britons Never, Never, Never Shall Be Slaves!".

== The Lincoln Green Mob ==
Published: 25 May 1974 to 22 March 1975
Artists: Félix Carrión, Geoff Campion, Fred Holmes

Robby Hood, Bill Scarlet, Fatty Tuck and Johnny Little find a horn that freezes anyone else for five minutes when they blow it.

== Little Orvy ==
Published: 2 March to 31 August 1968
Artist: Rick Yager

Imaginative Orvy daydreams about more exciting ways to learn in class.

- Cartoon strip. Reprints of Field Enterprises syndicated newspaper strip "The Imaginary Adventures of Little Orvy".

== Lords of Lilliput Island ==
Published: 27 May 1967 to 6 January 1968

After the adult population of the island of Mayo is shrank by nuclear drinking water contamination. The good-natured Clive Driscoll and his chums try to protect the shrunk-down grown-ups from island bully Tug Wilson.

== The Lout That Ruled the Rovers ==
Published: 20 December 1975 to 10 April 1976
Artist: Félix Carrión

Alf "Monty" Montgomery has his lifetime ban from attending Mudville Rangers surprisingly lifted when he inherits a 51% controlling interest, and installs himself as player-manager.

- Introduced to the comic under the editorship of John Wagner.

== The Lurking Menace ==
Published: 17 January to 17 May 1970

Diving to recover gold bullion from a shipwreck off the coast of Australia, Tod Titan soon finds he is not the only man hunting for the treasure.

- Modified reprints of "Captain X, Tiger Shark" from Tiger.

== The Man Called 39 ==
Published: 23 February to 25 May 1963
Artist: Tom Kerr

Secret agent Nick Shadow is released from Fenmoor Prison to go undercover and infiltrate a gang of assassins.

- Continued from Knockout.

== Mark Tyme ==
Published: 20 October 1962 to 16 February 1963
Artist: Reg Parlett

Nuisance soldier Private Mark Tyme incurs the wrath of Sergeant-Major Bellow.

- Cartoon strip.

== Master Spy, the Schoolboy Secret Agent ==
Published: 2 March to 27 April 1968
Artist: Alf Saporito

Young Septimus is desperate to follow his father into intelligence, much to the irritation of his dad.

- Cartoon strip.

== Master-Mind ==
Published: 15 May 1965 to 23 April 1967

The frequent failures of a would-be gangster kingpin and his inept mob.

- Cartoon strip. Not to be confused with "Master Mind" from Buster.

== Mickey the Mimic ==
Published: 7 April 1973 to 30 August 1975

A young boy puts his skill at reproducing noises to use playing pranks.

- Cartoon strip, modified reprints of "Hi Fi Sid" from Radio Fun, previously printed in Buster.

== The Midgets of Migas ==
Published: 5 March to 2 April 1966
Artist: Boixcar

Exploring the planet Migas, Ron Foster discovers a race of tiny humans.

- Modified reprint from El Mundo Futuro.

== Mission to Marva ==
Published: 15 to 22 January 1966
Artist: Boixcar

- Modified reprint from El Mundo Futuro.

== Mowser ==
Published: 25 May 1974 to 3 April 1976
Cartoonist: Reg Parlett

In Crummy Castle sly, supine housecat Mowser constantly comes out on top in struggles with his nemesis James the Butler.

- Comic strip, continued from Lion; often absent or using reprints.

== The Mystery of Fulgor ==
Published: 11 to 25 December 1965
Artist: Boixcar

The discovery of the planet Fulgor in the Solar System in 2215 leads to a crewed expedition to check its viability for colonisation.

- Modified reprint from El Mundo Futuro.

== Mytek the Mighty ==
Published: 26 September 1964 to 31 January 1970
Writer: Tom Tully
Artist: Eric Bradbury, Bill Lacey

Professor Arnold Boyce builds a huge robot version of the Akari tribe's god Mytek to make contact with the isolated natives; however, his bitter assistant steals Mytek and causes chaos, with the Professor and agent Dick Mason in pursuit.

== The Nutts ==
Published: 6 October 1962 to 16 October 1976
Writer: Reg Orlandini
Artist: Angel Nadal

A family find unconventional ways of bettering their ramshackle house without spending any money.

- Cartoon strip.

== Odd Job Bob ==
Published: 10 June 1972 to 21 April 1973
Artist: Hugh McNeill

Dim dogsbody Bob complicates everyday situations.

- Cartoon strip, reprints from Buster.

== One Man and His Dog... ==
Published: 14 October 1972 to 3 March 1973
Writer: Les Lilley
Artist: Graham Allen

A dog tries to keep his thick master out of scrapes.

- Cartoon strip, reprints from Buster.

== One-Eyed Jack ==
Published: 20 December 1975 to 16 October 1976
Writer: John Wagner
Artist: John Cooper

Eyepatch-wearing Detective Jack McBane undertakes a ruthless war on New York's criminals.

- Continued in Battle Picture Weekly.

== Our 'Great' Grandpa ==
Published: 23 September 1972 to 6 January 1973
Artist: Trevor Metcalfe

Two boys try to keep control of their wild, young-at-heart grandfather.

- Cartoon strip, reprints from Buster.

== Paco ==
Published: 17 April to 16 October 1976
Artist: John Stokes, Alberto Salinas

Half-wolf, half-dog Paco deals with cruel trappers.

== Paladin the Fearless ==
Published:: 6 October 1962 to 27 July 1963
Writer: Jean-Michel Charlier
Artist: Albert Uderzo

A young boy is raised by woodcutter Cedric Cedarwood to become the successor to folk hero Paladin the Peerless and fight off the Vikings.

- Modified reprints of Balloy from Pilote.

== Percy the Problem Child ==
Published: 6 October 1962 to 20 April 1963
Artist: Reg Parlett

A cheerful boy poses trivia questions for readers.

- Cartoon strip.

== The Potters of Poole Street ==
Published: 29 March to 13 December 1975
Artists: Jack Pamby, John Catchpole, Geoff Campion

Growing up in poverty in the Midlands town of Dunchester, Alfie Potter tries to save for a mountain bike so he can earn some money for his widowed mother and sister Maude.

== The Prisoner of Zenga ==
Published: 11 October to 13 December 1975
Artist: John Stokes

Project Z is an effort by Professor Gleeson to find an android capable of storing brain patterns in order to preserve genius for future generations. However, his devious assistant Julian Caine ensures that the first brain copied into the prototype is the mind of master criminal Max Zenga.

- A Zenga robot made a brief appearance in 2018's The Vigilant.

== Raven on the Wing ==
Published:: 2 March 1968 to 18 January 1975
Artist: Francisco Solano López

Gypsy boy Raven joins struggling Highboro' United, where his skills soon help turn the team around despite his eccentricities and superstitions, which included insisting on playing barefoot.

== Return of the Claw ==
Published:: 5 June 1971 to 27 October 1973

Louis Crandell digs out his metal hand and goes back into action.

- Sequel to "The Steel Claw".

== Rip Kerrigan ==
Published: 27 January to 24 February 1968

Sheriff Rip Kerrigan keeps order in the down of Red Gulch during the Arizona gold rush.

- Reprints from Buster.

== Robot Archie ==
Published: 2 November to 7 December 1974

Pals Ted Ritchie and Ken Dale are given control of a powerful robot created by Ritchie's uncle, which they use to hunt for treasure in the jungle of South America.

- The former Lion strip made a six-week "guest appearance".

== Saboteurs of Space ==
Published: 29 January to 12 February 1966
Artist: Boixcar

Space police officers Dave Blake and Frank Preston investigate sabotage on the planet Beel in 2230, with the evidence pointing towards Blake's brother Steve.

- Modified reprint from El Mundo Futuro.

== Sam Sunn ==
Published: 13 May 1967 to 24 February 1968
Artist: Reg Parlett

The misadventures of a small, superhumanly strong boy.

- Cartoon strip. Modified reprints of "Knockout Kid" from Knockout.

== School for Spies ==
Published: 5 January to 18 May 1974
Artist: Neville Wilson

Orphan Danny Conway is transferred to a special school where he can be trained for the intelligence services.

== The Secret Champion ==
Published: 24 May to 20 December 1969

Frustrated sportsman turned journalist Mark Keen gets advice from the ghost of his gladiator forebear.

- Modified reprints of "Mike Kane - Gladiator" from Buster.

== Sergeant Strong ==
Published: 29 March to 6 December 1975
Writer: Scott Goodall
Artist: Eric Bradbury

After an accident in space, Sgt. Simon Strong is left with ten times the strength and density of a normal man. He puts his abilities to stopping crime.

- A collected edition of "Sergeant Strong" was published in 2023 as part of Hibernia's Fleetway Files series.

== Sexton Blake ==
Published: 13 January 1968 to 16 May 1970
Writer: Angus Allan
Artist: Eric Dadswell

Further adventures of the crime-solving detective.

- Based on the TV version of Blake; some strips were adapted from "Maxwell Hawke" in Buster.

== Shorty the Sheriff ==
Published: 6 October 1962 to 16 February 1963
Writer: Reg Orlandini
Artist: Reg Parlett

A diminutive sheriff suffers mishaps in the Old West.

- Cartoon strip.

== The Shrinker ==
Published: 2 March 1968 to 10 January 1970
Artist: Mike Western

Evil scientist Capek develops a machine that can shrink people, starting with RAF men Flint and Slake.

- Reprints from Buster.

== Simon Test and the Islands of Peril ==
Published: 10 April to 29 May 1971
Writer: Angus Allan
Artist: Eric Bradbury

Six adventurers - including Simon Test - are kidnapped by the mysterious Big Man and put through lethal ordeals on half-a-dozen Islands of Perils.

- Continued from Smash!.

== Sixer ==
Published: 6 October 1962 to 16 February 1963

An overly-enthusiastic boy scout causes good-natured chaos.

- Cartoon strip.

== Slave of the Screamer ==
Published: 23 May 1970 to 3 April 1971
Writer: Tom Tully
Artist: Jesús Blasco

== Soldier Sharp - The Rat of the Rifles ==
Published: 28 February to 16 October 1976
Writer: John Wagner
Artists: R. Charles Roylance, Eric Bradbury, Frank McDairmid

As the Allies liberate France in 1944, Cockney loudmouth Arnie Sharp's cowardice gets most of his unit killed, but circumstances see him incorrectly recognised as a hero. Only his badly-injured childhood acquaintance Sammy Little survives with knowledge of the truth.

- Continued in Battle Picture Weekly.

== Son of the Stars ==
Published: 9 October to 23 October 1965
Artist: Boixcar

With 21st century Earth over-crowded, a rocket crew scope out the Solar System for colonisation.

- Modified reprint from El Mundo Futuro.

== The Soppy Ha'porths ==
Published: 6 October 1962 to 9 February 1963
Artist: Arthur Martin

- Cartoon strip.

== The Space Explorers ==
Published: 30 October 1965 to 13 November 1965
Artist: Boixcar

In 2075, astronauts Don Stacer, Bruce Campbell and Pete Douglass make a forced landing on the Moon.

- Modified reprint from El Mundo Futuro.

== Space Pirates ==
Published: 1 to 8 January 1966
Artist: Boixcar

With numerous planets being discovered in the 21st century, a scrabble to claim the new bodies develops.

- Modified reprint from El Mundo Futuro.

== Spellbinder ==
Published: 25 January to 1 March 1975
Artist: Geoff Campion

Tom Turville is helped by sorcerer ancestor Sylvester.

- The former Lion strip made a six-week "guest appearance".

== Sporty ==
Published: 23 February 1963 to 28 October 1972
Artists: Reg Wootton

Amiable, diminutive Sporty tries his hand in a variety of outdoor activities, despite the whinging antics of lanky friend Sydney to spoil things.

- Continued from Knockout.

== Spot the Clue with Zip Nolan ==
Published: May 25, 1974 to 21 February 1976

Zip Nolan is an American highway patrolman from Pensburgh, equipped with detective skills and a Harley Davidson Electra Glide motorcycle.

- Continued from Lion, mainly in reprint form and often missing occasional issues.

== The Star of Fortune ==
Published: 10 October 1970 to 3 April 1971

Texan schoolboy Willie Wilson gains powers of premonition from his grandfather's sheriff's badge.

- Modified reprints of "The Boy Who Knew Too Much" from Buster.

== Star Trek ==
Published: 2 October 1971 to 29 December 1973
Writer: Angus Allan
Artist: John Stokes

Captain Kirk and the company of the spaceship U.S.S. Enterprise bravely journey to where people have not been previously.

- Continued from TV21. The comics have been collected by IDW Publishing as Star Trek - The Classic UK Comics.

== The Steel Claw ==
Published: 6 October 1962 to 16 May 1970
Writers: Ken Bulmer (6 October 1962 to 21 September 1963), Tom Tully (21 September 1963 to 16 May 1970)
Artists: Jesús Blasco, Tom Kerr, Massimo Belardinelli, Carlos Cruz, Reg Bunn

Louis Crandell gains the ability to turn invisible when he receives an electric shock through his metal hand.

- Revived as "Return of the Claw" in 1972.

== Stryker ==
Published: 21 August to 16 October 1976
Artist: Ian Kennedy

== The Swots and the Blots ==
Published: 10 April 1971 to 18 May 1974
Writer and Artist: Leo Baxendale

Two factions - the academically inclined Swots (led by Cyril, and including 'Oiliver' Oliver, Cynthia, 'Hooter' Horace, Pudding Face, 'Eggy' Egbert, 'Nosy' Norman', Walter 'Crawly' Crawleigh and 'Cadger' Cuthbert) and the mischief-driven Blots (commanded by George, and consisting of Alf Wit, Spiky, Pongo Brown, Beryl, Tich, Henry 'The Eighth', 'Hairbert' Herbert, Fred and Fatty) struggle for supremacy at a school.

- Cartoon strip, continued from Smash!. Alf Wit is not to be confused with The Beano character of the same name.

== Tatty Mane ==
Published: 30 April 1966 to 17 February 1968

A weedy lion makes unsuccessful attempts to assert his role as king of the jungle.

- Cartoon strip.

== Terrors of the Deep ==
Published: 9 to 23 April 1966
Artist: Boixcar

- Modified reprint from El Mundo Futuro.

== The Test Match Terrors ==
Published: 29 March to 4 October 1975
Artist: Mike White

Hailing from the village of Little Swaledon, Albert Ashe recruits an unconventional cricket team.

== They Couldn't Break Brady ==
Published: 13 December 1975 to 3 April 1976
Artist: Eric Bradbury

Dave Brady's career at First Division Milburn United is dogged by someone's repeated attempts to injure him.

== To Glory We Steer ==
Published: 6 October 1962 to 16 February 1963
Artist: Eric Parker

Horatio Nelson moves up through the ranks in the Royal Navy.

- Modified reprints of Nelson from The Comet.

== Tommy Hawk and Mo Cassin ==
Published: 6 October 1962 to 20 April 1963
Artist: Denis Gifford

Two Native American Braves irritate the rest of their tribe with their antics.

- Cartoon strip. Reprints from Knockout.

== Trail to Nowhere ==
Published: 25 May to 21 December 1974
Artist: Mike Western

Trapper Colorado Jones finds young Simon Grant, the sole survivor of a stagecoach massacre. The boy is in a hurry to head to his father at Fort Hazard, with Jones having the unenviable job of making sure the brat doesn't get himself killed first.

== The Trouble-Seekers ==
Published: 10 April to 25 December 1971
Artist: Ian Kennedy

Engineers 'Knocker' White, 'Jinx' Jenkins, Professor Toops and the latter's unreliable robot George deal with unusual situations.

== Tubby the All Round Sportsman ==
Published: 17 March to 11 August 1973
Artist: Reg Wootton

- Cartoon strip, reprints from Buster.

== The Tuffs of Terror Island ==
Published: 2 October 1971 to 6 May 1972
Artist: Tony Coleman

The three Tuff brothers, cabin boy Alf and ape-man called Lrrg land on the appropriately-named Terror Island.

- Continued from TV21.

== Twelve Guilty Men ==
Published: 15 May to 2 October 1965
Artist: Eric Dadswell

Framed and imprisoned by the Crime Incorporated Syndicate, Rod Marsden breaks out of jail with the help of fellow inmate Pat Murphy and begins hunting down the kingpins who put him behind bars.

== Valley of the Giants ==
Published: 25 May to 10 August 1974
Artist: Eric Bradbury

On an expedition to Brazil explorer Brett Mason, his family and scientist Doctor Jose Yarga become trapped in a strange volcanic valley where dinosaurs still live.

== Voyage of No Return ==
Published: 7 September 1968 to 25 January 1969

The travails of midshipman Ben Jackson.

- Modified reprints of "The Voyage of the Black Skull" from Tiger.

== Wacker ==
Published: 12 June 1971 to 4 March 1972
Artist: Juan Rafart y Roldán

An inept, cheerful sailor causes his captain endless problems.

- Cartoon strip, continued from Smash!. Not to be confused with "Whacker" from Lion.

== Wally Whale and Willy Winkle ==
Published: 8 September 1973 to 4 May 1974
Artist: Reg Parlett

A whale dodges hunters with the help of his winkle best friend.

- Cartoon strip, reprints from Buster.

== Wee Red ==
Published: 10 April to 14 August 1976
Artists: Miguel Repetto, Fred Holmes

Tynecastle FC manager Kenny Samuels makes the surprise discovery that local latch-key kid Wee Red is actually a supremely talented footballer, and tries to interest him in joining the club.

== When Britain Froze ==
Published: 16 September 1967 to January 1968

Freak weather conditions leave John and Jackie Adams struggling to survive in Scotland.

- Modified reprints of "Frozen Summer" from Buster.

== Whiz-Along Wheeler ==
Published: 28 December 1974 to 22 March 1975
Artist: Mike White

Circus owner's son Willie Wheeler gets a place on the Loxton Lions speedway team, but has to deal with the team's hostile star rider Bruce Kilby.

== The Wild Wonders ==
Published: 28 March 1964 to 18 May 1974, 25 October to 13 December 1975
Writer: Tom Tully
Artist: Mike Western

With a tough upbringing on the remote Woragg Island in the Hebrides, brothers Charlie and Rick Wild have little to do but stay fit. On rescuing them, Olympic swimmer Mike Flynn finds their find their fitness makes them champion athletes - though not all their competitors are impressed with the upstarts due to their primitive behaviour.

== World in Peril ==
Published: 27 December 1969 to 18 April 1970

An alien race attempts to invade Earth.

- Modified reprints of "The Dome of Doom" from Buster.

== Yellowknife of the Yard ==
Published: 1 January 1972 to 31 August 1974
Writers: Pat Mills
Artist: Douglas Maxted

Son of Sioux chief Black Arrow, Yellowknife travels to England and finds his unorthodox methods are useful to Scotland Yard.

- Co-created by Mills and John Wagner.
