= The Astounding Adventures of Charlie Peace =

British comic book story

- The first page of "The Astounding Adventures of Charlie Peace" from the 12 August 1972 edition of Buster.
- First appearance: Valiant 20 July 1964 (20 July 1964)

Publication information
- Publisher: Fleetway Publications; IPC Magazines
- Schedule: Weekly
- Formats: Original material for the series has been published as a strip in the comics anthology(s) Valiant; Buster; The Big One.
- Publication date: 20 July 1964 – 15 June 1974

Creative team
- Artist(s): Eric Bradbury; Tom Kerr; Jack Pamby; Alan Philpott; Doug Maxted

"The Astounding Adventures of Charlie Peace" is a British comic strip published in the weekly anthology Buster from 27 June 1964 to 28 December 1974, published by Fleetway Publications and later IPC Magazines. It was previewed by a single instalment in Valiant on 20 June 1964. The strip featured fictionalised adventures of the real-life Victorian era criminal Charles Peace.

== Creation ==
Charlie Peace's escapades had caused a sensation in working class Victorian society, with the criminal becoming something of a folk hero due to his constant evasion of the police. Soon after his eventual capture and execution a penny dreadful garishly recounting his exploits–Charles Peace or, The Adventures of a Notorious Burglar was published by G. Purkess of London, and ran to a hundred serialised issues between 1879 and 1880. Peace remained a notorious figure, inspiring a waxwork model at Madame Tussauds, films, books and plays.

The Buster version depicted Peace as a lovable rogue, something which is not considered historically accurate; neither Peace's murders nor his philandering were mentioned in the comic strip, which instead portrayed him as a cunning small-time thief and grifter.

== Publishing history ==
At the time, Buster was moving towards becoming a humour comic but still ran adventure stories; "The Astounding Adventures of Charlie Peace" was one of three action-orientated serials designed to keep the title popular with older readers, appearing in the 27 June edition of Buster alongside similar action-humour story "Johnny Samson" (actually redrawn episodes of "Thunderbolt Jaxon" from Knockout) and science fiction tale "The Drowned World". Unusually, "The Astounding Adventures of Charlie Peace" was trailed the previous week in the all-action Valiant a week ahead of its commencement in Buster.

The strip was initially 1½ pages per week before expanding to two and three full pages later in 1965. As the strip progressed the character's features were softened, but the format remained unchanged. Each episode was standalone, and would typically involve Charlie coming up with a scheme to get rich while avoiding the police. His planned heist would rapidly go off the rails or prove to be a lot less lucrative than imagined, with Peace remaining at liberty but failing to gain any substantial loot. The strip featured no supporting characters; while Charlie would not break the fourth wall he tended to narrate his actions.

The format changed in January 1968, when Peace was tricked into entering a time machine secreted in a safe and was sent forward to the present day, though beyond technology being added to the list of things thwarting Charlie's thefts. He also received a sidekick in the form of a parrot called Beakie, who proved to be little help but gave Peace another outlet for his narration. The strip continued to be popular and original episodes ran until 1973. The final new episode saw Peace return to the Victorian era, after which the series continued as reprints of 1960s strips under the new title Wanted - The Elusive Charlie Peace. Contrary to many reports, the strip was not completely dropped to make way for material brought in from Cor!!, which was merged with Buster from 22 June 1974, but continued to appear intermittently until the end of the year.

In 2005, the Egmont library—consisting of the pre-1970 Amalgamated Press/Fleetway Publications/IPC Magazines publications and characters—was licensed to DC Comics, and the Albion mini-series was created by the DC subsidiary WildStorm. The comic combined numerous British characters and strips into a combined universe. Charlie Peace was among those chosen and was given a sizeable role, having avoided a government purge of adventurers by going into hiding, running an antiques shop under the name of 'Charles Love'. Despite his curmudgeonly personality he was eventually persuaded to help protagonists Danny Doom and Penny Dolmann break into a prison in Scotland. In 2018, the characters still owned by Egmont were purchased by Rebellion Developments.

== Reception ==
The strip has attracted some attention from scholars of the real Charles Peace. Geoffrey Howse considered the success of the strip nearly a century after Peace's death by hanging as an indication of his impact on British culture. The first instalment was reprinted in Charlie Peace – His Amazing Life and Astounding Legend, an overview of the real Peace's life and legend published by Michael Eaton. In an essay on Peace in collection Crime, Eaton considered the strips "beautifully drawn [and] subtly subversive" Lew Stringer would later credit the Buster version of Peace as the inspiration for his strip "Tom Thug".
