= Janus Stark (disambiguation) =

Janus Stark may refer to one of the following:

- Janus Stark, a 1960s British comic strip by Tom Tully and Francisco Solano López.
- Janus Stark (band), a British punk band named after this comic strip.
