= Jack o' Justice =

British comic book story

- Moll Moonlight (left) and Jack o' Justice in the 18 January 1964 issue of Valiant, art by Tom Kerr.
- First appearance: Radio Fun (22 August 1959)

Publication information
- Publisher: Amalgamated Press; Fleetway Publications
- Schedule: Weekly
- Title(s): Radio Fun; 22 August 1959 to 18 February 1961; Valiant; 6 October 1962 to 18 June 1966; Valiant Annual; 1964-1966; Valiant Picture Library #9
- Formats: Original material for the series has been published as a strip in the comics anthology(s) Radio Fun; Valiant.
- Genre: Action/adventure
- Publication date: 22 August 1959 – 18 June 1966

Creative team
- Artist(s): Hugh McNeill; Geoff Campion; John McNamara; Jack Pamby; Mike Western; Tom Kerr

Jack o' Justice is a British comic character who has appeared in eponymous strips published by Fleetway Publications. The character is a highwayman adventurer, first appeared in the anthology title Radio Fun on 22 August 1956. The strip began as altered reprints of a Dick Turpin strip from the comic Sun but after being revived in the pages of Valiant became popular enough that new adventures were commissioned. The character was partnered with Moll Moonlight in his adventures - a rare example of a prominent female character in boys' comics of that time. The strip was succeeded in 1966 by Jack Justice, featuring a descendant of the characters.

== Creation ==
The enduring legend of highwayman Dick Turpin inspired the creation of a comic strip featuring the character in 1951 for Sun Weekly, a boys adventure periodical published by Amalgamated Press.

The strips gave Turpin - in the words of comics historian David Ashford - a "delightful female companion" in the form of the entirely fictional Moll Moonlight, a similar outlaw adventurer. By this point most British comics had abandoned any attempt to cater to both genders equally, and the recurring characters of a weekly boy's comic were typically all male. Sun editor, Leonard Matthews had unsuccessfully tried to launch a strip centered on a highwaywoman and then used the Turpin strip to get the character into print.

Written by Mike Butterworth and initially drawn by Hugh McNeill, the strip proved popular with readers, and would run until Sun was closed in the midst of the company's reconfiguration into Fleetway Publications under the ownership of the Mirror Group in 1959.

Another long-running publication, Radio Fun survived the transition to Fleetway, but was growing increasingly outdated. Created in 1938, as its name suggested it had originally revolved around strips based on British radio programmes and personalities, later adding film and television-inspired material to the mix. Steps were made to turn it into a broader weekly comic in the late 1950s, with more of an emphasis on adventure strips, including reworked Superman newspaper strips and Western staple Wild Bill Hickok.

Joining these in August 1959 (overlapping briefly with the last episodes of "Dick Turpin" in Sun) was "Jack o' Justice". At the time, readers generally only stayed with boys' comics in general for between three and five years while old comics were rarely kept or collected, meaning the publishers were able to get away with a degree of repetition. As such cost-cutting reprints of material that could still pass as up-to-date were not uncommon, and the decision was made to modify the earlier "Dick Turpin" strips - then some eight years old - into those of a new character, Jack o' Justice. The actual modifications were minimal, largely consisting of changing the character names and the strip's title, with Moll Moonlight becoming Velvet.

== Publishing history ==
The new direction - which included being renamed Radio Fun and Adventures - was not enough to save the comic, though, and in February 1961 it was the first of many titles to be merged into Buster, with "Jack o' Justice" not among the features which was continued. However, a year later the new management were putting together the new boys' comic Valiant and the modified Turpin reprints continued within, with Moll returning to her original name. Despite their old-fashioned art contrasting with the more modern styles used on the likes of "The Steel Claw", the strip was highly popular with readers - so much so that when the Turpin/Moonlight strips ran out an attempt was made to continue them with more heavily redrawn reprints of "Claude Duval" from Comet before all-new material was commissioned in 1964, with Tom Kerr as primary artist and a turn towards supernatural-tinged mystery. These strips introduced recurring villain Silas Loring and were a success, running until 1966 - when they were replaced by "Jack Justice", which established that Moll had made an honest man of Jack o' Justice, and followed their present-day detective descendant and his own alliterative accomplice Diana Dauntless until 1967.

Since 2018, the material has been owned by Rebellion Developments.

== Plot summary ==
Framed for a crime he did not commit by "Spider" Webb, highwayman Jack o' Justice is able to get free and attempts to hunt down his enemy. Together with his female companion (Note: Initially named Velvet, but later retconned Moll Moonlight without explanation) he foiled sinister kidnapper Snatchall and then saw Webb brought to justice. The pair then continued to adventure on the roads together, helping the innocent and investigating the mysterious.

They faced included Russian noble Count Vronsky, who used a giant to keep the local population under his thumb. Leaving Moll briefly in Yorkshire, Jack joined his friends - and former companions of Dick Turpin Jem Peters and Beetles to track Vronsky to Greystone Grange, seemingly leaving his enemy buried. Jack rejoined Moll and the pair set out to investigate Blackrock Manor to search for missing heiress Anne Carstairs, held by evil lawyer Jabez Creak. They subsequently clashed repeatedly with archenemy the Spectre, foiling his attempts to rob the Crown Prince of Holstenstein freeing villagers he was holding to Crag Castle; and preventing him from stealing the Crown Jewels, seemingly finally seeing the villain dead.

Jack and Moll soon found other foes to fight, including Jasper Catsby, Swiss usurper Wolfgang Wiley the Faceless One and his giant manservant Obad, banker Jasper Ragland, the Black Dragon secret society, and Judge Dragonslude. Next, their adventures would bring them into contact with the deformed criminal mastermind Silas Loring, who they would battle on three further occasions. Others Jack and Moll defeated included mad doctor Seth Toombs, assassin the Yellow Scorpion, air-ballooning kidnapper the Hawk and evil millionaire Doom.
