= The House of Dolmann =

British comic book story

- Eric Dolmann and his puppets, Valiant Annual 1971.

Publication information
- Publisher: Fleetway Publications; IPC Magazines
- Schedule: Weekly
- Title(s): Valiant; 29 October 1966 to 11 April 1970; 7 September to 26 October 1974; Valiant Annual; 1968-1971
- Formats: Original material for the series has been published as a strip in the comics anthology(s) Valiant.
- Publication date: 29 October 1966 – 26 October 1974
- Main character(s): Eric Dolmann; Togo; Raider; Mole; Elasto

Creative team
- Writer(s): Tom Tully
- Artist(s): Eric Bradbury; Carlos Cruz-Diez; Reg Bunn; Geoff Campion

Reprints
- Collected editions
- The House of Dolmann: ISBN 9781786184917

"The House of Dolmann" is a British comic strip published by Fleetway Publications and later IPC Magazines in the boys' comic anthology title Valiant between 29 October 1966 to 11 April 1970, with a brief revival from 7 September to 26 October 1974. Written by Tom Tully and primarily illustrated by Eric Bradbury, the strip centred on the exploits of genius inventor Eric Dolmann and his army of crime-fighting robot 'puppets'.

== Creation ==
Fleetway's Valiant had soon established itself as the company's best-selling boys' weekly after launching in October 1962. Among its most successful strips was the fantasy-tinged secret agent thriller "The Steel Claw", while a merger with the long-running Knockout in 1963 had brought the similarly themed adventure story "Kelly's Eye". 1964 saw the addition of "Mytek the Mighty" as readers continued to respond well to the style, and in 1966 "The House of Dolmann" was added to the line-up. At this point all of these strips were being written by the prolific Tom Tully. He was paired up with artist Eric Bradbury, who also worked on "Mytek the Mighty" and had been with Fleetway since they were known as Amalgamated Press, joining the company in 1949.

"The House of Dolmann" was to be a weekly black-and-white strip; whereas most British comic features were either ongoing serials or standalone stories, the new addition mixed both approaches.

Several commentaries have noted the ambiguity over Eric Dolmann's robots having dialogue. Early stories attributed this to his ventriloquism skills; however, as the comic went on their speech became more complex, including arguing among themselves and occasionally back-chatting their creator, and the source of their voices was only mentioned sporadically. There has been good-natured discussion over whether this was an intentional decision to portray the eccentric Dolmann as essentially talking to, and thus arguing with, himself or whether Tully either forgot or intentionally ignored his own initial idea.

== Publishing history ==
Debuting in the 29 October 1965 edition of Valiant, the strip quickly proved popular with readers and ran weekly until 11 April 1970, also appearing in various Valiant Annuals and other specials. While Bradbury was the main artist others contributed on occasion, including Spanish artist Carlos Cruz-Diez as well as veterans Reg Bunn and Geoff Campion. Following the successful reintroduction of the Steel Claw in "Return of the Claw", a brief revival featured in autumn 1974, billed as a "guest appearance by an old "Valiant" favourite!". The short length and self-contained nature of many of the stories meant the strip was often seen as prime filler for other titles, notably the 1970s reprint anthology Vulcan.

The strip was among the properties licensed to Time Warner by IPC in 2005, leading to the creation of the WildStorm mini-series Albion. This posited Eric Dolmann as one of numerous unusual adventurers rounded up by the Spider at the behest of the British government and imprisoned in a castle in Scotland, with their existence covered up. Written by Leah Moore and John Reppion, the title imagined Dolmann had a daughter called Penny, a reimagination of Leo Baxendale's previously unrelated "Bad Penny" character, who came into the possession of his robots to mount a rescue mission. She finds her father has died in incarceration, but frees his friends and plans to set up a new 'House of Dolmann'.

In 2018, Valiant and its contents were among the titles purchased from IPC by Rebellion Developments. A new story was included in Rebellion's Smash 2020 Special, alongside revivals of several other British strips of a similar period. The new story was written by The Vigilant writer Simon Furman, who noted "I loved the original's oddball, bubble reality - it has a Prisoner or John Steed Avengers vibe". Jamaican artist Davi Go was initially planned to illustrate the story but withdrew; Chris Weston - a fan of the series from reading Kobra (the German version of Vulcan) as a youth - stepped in to take on art duties.

Rebellion issued a collection of the earliest "House of Dolmann" strips in their Treasury of British Comics series in 2022, featuring a new cover by Brian Bolland. A hardcover version with a cover by Weston was also released, exclusive to Rebellion's website.

== Plot summary ==
Eric Dolmann is an unconventional agent working for International Security, putting his skills at creating advanced miniature remote-controlled robots, styled after a variety of puppets, which he controls via micro-transmitters fitted to his belt. He operates under the cover of a shop located at Friar Street in the East End of London, and initially transported his robot 'children' into battle in a motorcycle and sidecar known as the Dolbike (fitted with a Dolpower fuel system capable of boosting the machine's speed considerably) or the specialised flying twin-rotor Dolmobile. The avoid reprisals he used the cover name of Jonas Luthor to run a robotics business from his shop, and he receives missions from an eyepatch-wearing intelligence agent known only as The Marshal.

While Dolmann goes into action against many underworld foes, the most frequent are D.A.R.T - the Department of Arson, Revolution and Terror. Other foes included winged criminal The Hawk, white metal-obsessed thief The Silver Fiend, magnet-using robber Dr. Magno, circus acrobat turned cat burglar the Wildcat disgruntled demobbed robbers the Commando Raiders greedy hoarder the Gold Miser, the rocket-booted art thieves the Roller-Skate Rogues, amusement arcade owner Hymie and his own Titan robots kidnappers targeting film star Gloria Pearl, and the illusionist Dr. Mirako subterranean crime-lord the Frog, mad scientist Prof. Accelero, ex-circus performer Pedlar Robins fiendish magician The Great Hypno alien Lava Men, monument-stealing Dr. Imbibo the Spidermen, rival Toymaster and his mechanical toy soldiers, and the Troll, who attempted smear Dolmann with duplicates of his robots.

Dolmann's puppets included: -

- Togo: boastful and immensely strong; styled after a sumo wrestler.
- Raider: a stealth trooper with a miniature gun that can fire a wide range of pellets; styled after a British Commando.
- Mole: the group's digger, whose forearms can be switched between claws, drills and other power tools as the situation demands.
- Giggler: a manic figure largely used for distraction; modelled on a jester.
- Astro: the ace pilot of the Dolmobile.
- Elasto: made out an experimental plastic which heats and cools, allowing him to stretch huge distances; modelled on a track athlete.
- Trailer: a knuckle-dragging tracker, equipped with oversized magga-ray eyes that can follow a variety of tracks and project various lights.
- Micro: fitted with a two-way radio to allow reconnaissance and communication, with suction pads instead of extremities; styled after a superhero, and much smaller than the others.
- Egghead: a rocket-powered, highly intelligent and snooty computerised robot with a 'thinking cap' that concealed myriad weapons.
- Nosey: another tracker (to the intense jealousy of Trailer), this one equipped with sophisticated olfactory sensors; modelled on a bloodhound.
- Metallo: a nervous, square-headed shape-changer.
- Hovero: a jetpack-equipped robot; styled after an astronaut.
- Burglo: a Cockney robot skilled at breaking and entering, modelled on a stereotypical burglar.

== Collected editions ==
Title	ISBN	Publisher	Release date	Contents
The House of Dolmann	9781786184917	Rebellion Developments	14 April 2022	Material from Valiant 8 October 1966 to 6 May 1967.

== Reception ==
Ray Moore praised the strip for taking "fullest advantage" of Eric Bradbury's "superb skill". Steve Holland was equally effusive, feeling Bradbury's work was crucial to the strip's success. Reviewing the Treasury of British Comics volume, Ian Keogh praised the concept but felt the individual stories were "sadly never as strange".

In addition to Furman and Weston, 2000 AD editor Steve MacManus was a fan of the strip.
