= Albion (comics) =

Comic book series

- Cover to Albion issue #1, by Dave Gibbons.

Publication information
- Publisher: WildStorm (DC Comics)
- Format: Limited series
- Publication date: August 2005 – November 2006
- No. of issues: 6

Creative team
- Created by: Alan Moore (plot)
- Written by: Leah Moore & John Reppion
- Artist: Dave Gibbons (covers)
- Penciller: Shane Oakley
- Inker(s): George Freeman (with Richard Friend, Sandra Hope and Peter Guzman)
- Letterer: Todd Klein
- Colorist: Wildstorm FX
- Editor(s): Scott Dunbier, Kristy Quinn

Collected editions
- Albion (US): ISBN 978-1401209940
- Albion (UK): ISBN 978-1845763510
- Hardcover: ISBN 978-1837867837

Albion is a six-issue comic book limited series plotted by Alan Moore, written by his daughter Leah Moore and her husband John Reppion, with covers by Dave Gibbons and art by Shane Oakley and George Freeman. The series aimed to revive classic IPC-owned British comics characters, all of whom appeared in comics published by Odhams Press and Amalgamated Press/Fleetway Publications/IPC Media during the 1960s and early 1970s, such as Smash!, Valiant, and Lion.

== Creation ==
As a result of a deal forged by vice-president Bob Wayne of DC Comics and publishing director Andrew Sumner of IPC Media. Sumner described himself as a life-long fan of the characters. It was published through DC Comics' WildStorm imprint. In an interview with The Independent, Sumner noted that "These are characters who have been talked about by UK comic fans for the last 30 years since they ceased publication. They were a fundamental part of every British male's childhood in the Sixties". In an interview with Newsarama, Leah Moore noted that producing the series was made easier by Sumner being in contact with Wayne when the series was first pitched by Alan Moore and Shane Oakley. Her father had already plotted the issues when she and John Reppion began writing the stories, and subsequently proofed the dialogue. Alan Moore had hoped to write the series entirely but was busy with his work for America's Best Comics. Leah Moore also noted that the website International Hero was a source of research for the series.

== Publication history ==
Debuting with a cover date of August 2005, the first two issues were released monthly, with the third issue delayed two months – Moore & Reppion cited scheduling as impacting the art production), while Oakley suggested ongoing copyright issues were a factor. Initially solicited release between October 2005 and January 2006, issues 4–6 were subsequently resolicited, and finally released throughout 2006, with cover dates between June and November. The TPB collection followed swiftly after No. 6 was released in both the US and UK, from WildStorm and Titan Books respectively. Sumner felt the delays impacted the series' sales.

== Synopsis ==
The British superhero scene becomes embarrassing to the government. As a result, they hire criminal turned crimefighter the Spider to hunt and capture them. He achieves almost total success and the various superhumans are imprisoned in a castle in Scotland, requisitioned from the comatose Cursitor Doom by the Ministry of Defence. Their existence is covered up and the comics based on them are passed off as fictional works.

Decades later Danny is an unemployed orphan; his parents were killed in a bus crash. He has no memory of his life before the accident and has found solace in comics. Danny buys old back issues from a Liverpool antiques store ran by the dour Charles Love, and is confused when he finds an issue of Valiant featuring Janus Stark which he didn't think existed. Later on television, he sees a news item on criminal Grymleigh Gartside Fiendstien. Recognising him as Grimly Feendish from the pages of Smash!, he calls out the name outside court as he is taken to prison and is grabbed by Penny.

Penny takes him to a lock-up where she has been gathering information on the cover-up, including suppressed interviews with creators about meeting the real heroes and footage showing that Margaret Thatcher survived an IRA bombing due to wearing the Eye of Zoltec. Penny claims to be the daughter of the imprisoned Eric Dolmann and is in possession of some of her father's robots. Danny is initially sceptical until she takes him to the basement of a pub in Manchester, where Robot Archie is on display. Danny takes her to the antique shop, where Penny instantly recognises the proprietor as the time-travelling Victorian thief Charlie Peace. He is initially hostile until they make a deal – if Peace helps them rescue Eric and the other heroes, he will be able to loot the exotic technology held at the castle. Penny repairs Archie and the group sets off, travelling to Scotland on the Buoyant Queen thanks to Peace's connections.

The prison is overseen by Ian Eagleton, previously the archenemy of Feendish. Due to growing American concern over the dangers nature of the prisoners CIA Agent Zip Nolan has arrived to inspect the castle. Eagleton takes Nolan on a tour of the facility, and Nolan is shocked by the low level of security, including the degree of freedom given to supercomputer The Brain and dogsbody Faceache. Nolan meets several other inmates including Rubberman (kept at low temperatures to inhibit his powers after an escape attempt), Captain Hurricane (a psychotic, sedated World War II supersoldier who functions as the last resort to combat escapees) and the Spider. The latter largely engages in mind games, infuriating Nolan.

Arriving at the castle, Peace uses a Sapper to drill into the vault under the prison containing the technology captured along with the superhumans along with Danny and Penny. To provide a distraction a heavily modified Robot Archie storms the front gates. The trio begin releasing the prisoners but Penny finds out from Louis Crandell and Tim Kelly that her father died of a heart attack some years beforehand. Danny meanwhile is accosted by Cursitor Doom, long comatose until the break-in. He explains that he is actually his son, Danny Doom, and passes on his memory and the revelation that the castle is actually the Dooms' ancestral seat Castle Baalskein. Archie is finally destroyed by prison security but the prisoners – apart from the Spider – are now free and armed. Eagleton is attacked by Feendish, while Captain Hurricane is unleashed to restore order. However he is stomped by the reactivated Mytek, which then smashes down a wall and allows the prisoners out into the world. Nolan attempts to secure the Spider, only to find he was piloting Mytek, his place being taken by Faceache in return for the chance to reunite with his beloved Martha. Mytek goes out to sea with the Spider at the controls while the rest of the freed heroes escape on the Queen, wondering what their next move will be.

In an epilogue the Steel Claw infiltrates 10 Downing Street and confronts Tony and Cherie Blair to take back the Eye of Zoltec for his friend.

== Art and composition ==
Using a similar narrative device to that which Alan Moore employed in Supreme and Tom Strong, flashbacks are related in the style of comics of yesteryear. For example, a flashback to Penny's childhood is drawn in a style similar to Leo Baxendale's work, while a two-page pastiche of The Incredible Adventures of Janus Stark resembles the artwork of Francisco Solano López. Reppion felt this was an effective narrative tool. The series also features appearances by numerous Amalgamated Press/Fleetway/IPC characters, as well as other British pop culture sources, and also features cameos by some real-life creators such as Rod McKie and Steve Moore.

== Characters ==
- Danny: a scruffy young collector of old British comics who was apparently orphaned in a bus accident that robbed him of all memory of his previous life. He is dragged into Penny's attempt to infiltrate the castle in Scotland, and during the break-in discovers he is actually Danny Doom, the son of sorcerer Cursitor Doom. The original Danny Doom appeared in Valiant in 1974.
- Penny Dolmann: the daughter of inventor Eric Dolmann, as a child she loved to get in trouble and play with her father's robots. She was put into foster care after her father was arrested by the government and had a very difficult time in school. She has inherited his inventive genius, and has been locating his missing "dolls" since she was 18. Looking for allies she talks Danny into helping her assault the castle in Scotland. After discovering her father has died during imprisonment she decides to continue his legacy and restore the House of Dolmann. The character debuted in Bad Penny, created by Leo Baxendale for Smash! in 1966, though the character's relation to Dolmann was invented for Albion.
- Charlie Peace: a Victorian thief who travelled forward in time to the 1970s when he stole a magical watch from Cursitor Doom. After evading the government crackdown he set up a music shop in Liverpool under the alias "Charles Love" and later took over an antique store. He is eventually talked into helping Danny and Penny break into the prison. The character was taken from The Astounding Adventures of Charlie Peace in Buster – itself inspired by the real-life Victorian criminal Charles Peace.
- Robot Archie: An old-fashioned heroic mechanical man who was deactivated and served as a display in a Manchester pub until, Penny and Danny rescue and reactivate him. Fitted with armaments, he provides a distraction during the break-in and is eventually destroyed. The character first appeared in Lion in 1952, and was created by Ted Cowan and Ted Kearon.
- Ian Eagleton: as a child, Eagleton had many encounters with his nemesis Grimly Feendish, who terrified him. As an adult, he is the warden of the government prison that holds the heroes, villains, and other bizarre individuals from his youth. Despite his attempts to demonstrate otherwise he still suffers considerable trauma from his encounters with Feendish. The character was created by Baxendale in 1964 for the Eagle Eye, Private Spy strip in Wham!.
- Zip Nolan: once an American police detective who served in both Korea and Vietnam, he is now a member of the CIA who is investigating potential problems in the castle. He is particularly interested in the Spider due to his criminal career in America. The character first appeared in Lion in 1963 in Zip Nolan, which was later overhauled as Spot the Clue with Zip Nolan.
- Captain Hurricane: a huge, muscular World War II hero who is the final line of defence in the government prison. He has an old-fashioned style about him; he uses quaint phrases and is casually racist. His origin is revised in Albion, with Captain Hurricane the result of hundreds of experiments to create a supersoldier through the use of drugs. His batman 'Maggot' Malone is a medical doctor monitoring his condition and dosing the Captain's tea with sedatives, to prevent him from going into one of his terrifying psychotic "ragin' furies". The characters had been devised for Valiant in 1962.
- The Brain: a computer in the shape of a human head with a skull-like face and transparent cranium, the Brain is an "inmate" in the government prison who has become integrated with the prison computer systems and predicts an upcoming disaster. The computer had originally appeared in Brian's Brain as the property of a boy named Brian Kingsley in a strip devised by Bert Vandeput for Smash! in 1966.
- Cursitor Doom: a seemingly immortal sorcerer cursed to remain forever within the walls of his isolated castle who has been in a coma for the past "twenty-something years", a condition which allowed the government to convert his ancient home into a prison. He reawakens during the break-in and passes the Doom mantle to his son Danny before passing on. The character was created for Smash! in 1969.
- The Spider: the self-proclaimed "King of Crooks", this ego- and intellect-driven black-clad, pointy-eared master criminal was employed by the government to capture all super-villains and superheroes, all eccentric inventors and magicians, all bizarre freaks and weirdos, and exceptionally rebellious or gifted children who could be considered to be disruptive to the orderly running of British society. Once the job was done he was also imprisoned, because, as the Spider himself admits, "Nobody does treachery like the English". He enjoys playing mind games with his captors and is always looking for ways to escape. As a result, he is kept in isolation. He gives his real name as Alfred Chinnard (the name of homage version of the character featured in Jack Staff), though Nolan quickly realises that this is a false identity. The character was created by Ted Cowan and Reg Bunn for Lion in 1965.
- Faceache: Frederick Akeley has the ability to change or "scrunge" his face and body into a vast variety of different forms, many quite monstrous in appearance. He is a trustee in the prison and does impressions of Bruce Forsyth for the guards. He is dating Martina, a female inmate, and secretly working with the Spider. Faceache was created by Ken Reid in 1971 for Jet.
- Martina: a girl given make-up that her father brought home from Anvil Studios which can transform her face into that of a monster. She is imprisoned in the female wing but is in a relationship with Faceache. With her make-up confiscated and stored in the armoury she is a frequent target for bullying. The character was created for Martha's Monster Make-up in Monster Fun by Ken Reid in 1975.
- Grimly Feendish: Grymleigh Gartside Fiendstien began his life of crime over thirty years ago, committing crimes including theft, arson, murder, and acts of gross indecency with the help of his monstrous little "Squelchies". After evading capture for a long period eventually arrested and imprisoned in the government prison. The character originally appeared as the villain in Baxendale's Eagle Eye, Junior Spy in 1964, later gaining enough popularity to star in his own features.
- Captain Enoch: the skipper of The Buoyant Queen, an unreliable steamer. Enoch and his first mate Bert are old acquaintances of Charlie Peace and provide transport for the prison break-in. The characters were created for Queen of the Seas by Ken Reid, which appeared in Smash! from 1966.
- The Steel Claw: Louis Crandell had the ability to turn invisible by directing an electrical shock through his artificial right hand, causing him to vanish completely save for the metal prosthesis itself which seems to eerily float in the air. He later served as a government agent. When Crandell was arrested, the Claw was confiscated and locked away in the prison armoury. He is good friends with Tim Kelly, and both are known to Penny. The character was devised by Tom Tully for Valiant.
- Tim Kelly: Kelly rescued a South American shaman and was given a jewel called the Eye of Zoltec, which granted him invulnerability. He is an inmate the government prison, much aged after the jewel's confiscation. The Eye itself is shown to be in the possession of the British Prime Minister; at the end of the series Tim's friend Louis Crandell sets out to recover it from Tony Blair on his behalf. The character debuted in Kelly's Eye, created by Tom Tully for Knockout in 1962.
- Doctor Lazlo Gogra: an evil dwarf genius, long obsessed with possessing the towering robotic simian Mytek the Mighty. The latter is kept locked in the armoury under the prison, and due to his histrionic obsession with Mytek he is widely disliked by guards and inmates alike. During the escape he is killed by the Spider, who takes possession of Mytek for himself. Gogra first appeared as the antagonist in Mytek the Mighty, created for Valiant by Tom Tully in 1964.
- Rubberman: James Hollis had a curse placed on him by an Indian fakir that turned his body to rubber, allowing him to stretch great distances. At the instigation of the Spider, he attempted an escape with Tri-Man, which failed. As a result, he is stored in a cooled cell which negates his elasticity. The character debuted in It's The Rubber Man!, created for Smash! in 1966 by Ken Mennell.
- Tri-Man: Johnny Small obtained three amazing superpowers from a ray devised by Professor Meek – super-sight, super-speed, and super-strength – and used them to become the superhero Tri-Man. He was a prisoner until The Spider encouraged him to attempt an escape with Rubberman. Small was killed during the attempt, and buried in the prison's graveyard. The character debuted in Smash in 1969.

== Spin-offs ==
=== Albion Origins ===
A tie-in collection entitled Albion Origins was released by Titan Books in November 2007 in hardback, with a cover by Brian Bolland. This volume was designed to showcase the characters featured in Albion as they originally appeared in various IPC, Fleetway and other British comics. It featured reprints of several Cursitor Doom, Kelly's Eye, The Incredible Adventures of Janus Stark and The House of Dolmann stories, as well as newly written articles exploring the history of these characters' comics.

=== Thunderbolt Jaxon ===
Thunderbolt Jaxon was a five issue 2006 mini-series written by Dave Gibbons and drawn by John Higgins, with covers by Gibbons. The series was billed as being "from the world of Albion" due to the source of the material.

== Reception ==
Albion was nominated for "Favourite New Comicbook" in the 2006 Eagle Awards. Discussing the reception to the series with John Freeman, Reppion acknowledged it had drawn polarised reactions, noting "...Albion has a kind of Marmite type effect on people; you either love it or you hate it.".

Miles Fielder, writing in The Scotsman, said of Albion:

Albion's pages are peppered with references, some obvious, others oblique, to what's already an obscure milieu. Those with some knowledge of the AP/IPC comics' characters will delight in spotting them; newcomers will marvel at the surprisingly fertile creativity of the period (especially given America's domination of the comics marketplace with superhero titles such as The Amazing Spider-Man and Uncanny X-Men). Albion, however, is not purely a nostalgia trip. What Moore does here is nothing less noble than reviving these characters for our modern times.... [Moore] is arguably at his creative peak and busiest period, ... whatever the case, the co-writers are well served by artists with an eye for detail, Shane Oakley and George Freeman.

== Collected editions ==
A trade paperback collection of the six-issue limited series was released in the US on 13 December 2006 by WildStorm (ISBN 978-1401209940). Titan Books published the UK edition a month later, on 26 January (ISBN 978-1845763510).

Title	ISBN	Release date	Issues
Albion	978-1401209940	13 December 2006	Albion #1-6

2000 AD publisher Rebellion acquired Fleetway, the post-1970 IPC comics, in 2016 and then the rest of the IPC archive in 2018. This allowed them to release a hardcover edition in 2026 (ISBN 978-1837867837).

== See also ==
- The Vigilant, Rebellion's team based on the IPC characters
