= Danny Doom =

British comic book story

- Danny Doom (right) and Madgewick the rat in the 24 August 1974 issue of Valiant, art by Eric Bradbury.

Character information
- First appearance: Valiant (25 May 1974)

In-story information
- Full name: Daniel Doom
- Species: Human
- Place of origin: Earth
- Team affiliations: Astorath
- Partnerships: Madgewick; Carol Langdon
- Abilities: The Star of Astorath; The Hand of Orloff

Publication information
- Publisher: IPC Magazines
- Schedule: Weekly
- Title(s): Valiant; 25 May 1974 to 22 March 1975 (Note: No issues of Valiant were printed between the 29 June and 3 August 1974 editions.)
- Formats: Original material for the series has been published as a strip in the comics anthology(s) Valiant.
- Genre: Magic
- Publication date: 25 May 1974 – 22 March 1975

Creative team
- Artist(s): Eric Bradbury; Fred Holmes

Danny Doom is a British comic character who has appeared in eponymous strips published by IPC Magazines and Rebellion Developments. The character, a boy sorcerer, appeared in boys' weekly anthology comic Valiant between 25 May 1974 and 22 March 1975. The character is a 13th century boy sorcerer accidentally sent forward to the present day.

A reimagined version Danny Doom subsequently appeared in a major role in the 2005 - 2006 WildStorm limited series Albion, which declared him the son of another IPC mystic, Cursitor Doom.

== Creation ==
Danny Doom first appeared in the 25 May 1974 edition of Valiant, and was part of a general relaunch of the comic after it merged with long-running stablemate Lion. The new-look Lion and Valiant not only brought "Adam Eterno" and "Spot the Clue with Zip Nolan" from the cancelled title, but added four new serials - "The Lincoln Green Mob", "Valley of the Giants", "Trail to Nowhere" and "Danny Doom". Experienced artist Eric Bradbury drew "Danny Doom".

== Publishing history ==
The two-page feature ran in Valiant for just under a year, ending in the 22 March 1975 edition after four serials during another reshuffle of the title's contents. Bradbury drew the story for most of its life, aside from in October 1974 when another veteran, Fred Holmes, took over for a month. The inclusion of present-day girl Carol Langdon, drew comment from The Spectator in an overview of British comics of the time due to the rarity of female characters in boys' comics of the period. Some of the strips were reprinted in France in the pages of Mon Journal's anthology Janus Stark comic, featuring in issues 34 and 40 as a back-up strip.

In 2005 the character made a return as the lead protagonist of Albion, a WildStorm revival of numerous IPC characters. This portrayed Danny as a present-day youth with no memory of his childhood; the character's true nature was not made clear until the final issue of the series, where he was revealed to be the son of the previously unconnected Cursitor Doom. Series writer Leah Moore enjoyed writing Danny as she felt he was "well-meaning but crap".

By 2018, the rights to the character were owned by Rebellion Developments, and the original version made a cameo appearance in the one-shot The Vigilant as an ally called upon by Doctor Sin.

== Plot summary ==
In 13th century England, sorcerer Astrorath accidentally conjures a demon while brewing a potion in his crypt under Doom Lodge, but his young apprentice Daniel is powerful enough to drive the creature off. In awe of the boy's power, Astrorath attempts to get his aid to harness the power of instant transportation across time and space; however, the experiment goes wrong; Danny and his pet rat Madegwick are flung forward hundreds of years to the present day. Appearing in the ruins of their master's house, he explores the strange new world, finding his disappearance from the past has become part of folklore in the nearby village. Workers planning to demolish the remnants of Doom Lodge accidentally unleash a Cyclodon spirit, but Danny is able to defeat it. He plans to watch over the village from the ruins.

Danny tries to reverse the spell and return to his own time, but is unsuccessful. When a creature kills the villager, he is able to recover the fearsome Hand of Orloff from the crypt below the Lodge and use it to track the attacker, which is targeting members of the Helsdon family, finding that Marcus Helsdon and his manservant were using a Hound of Hell to bump off their relatives to claim inheritance. Danny helped true heir Jack claim his legacy.

After another attempt to return to the 13th century simply moved him through space rather than time, Danny helped local girl Carol Langdon after her father was killed by the reanimated Ancient Egyptian giant Dargath after coming close to discovering the secret of the Golden Relics in Morg Museum. Together, the pair were able to defeat the apparent ghost of cruel Saxon king Gudrun - actually a projection operated by museum curator Septimus Steed. Following his capture, Carol asked to join Danny on his quest to protect humanity from dark forces.

Instead of trying to go back in time, Danny rigged the Spell of Transportation to take the pair to the place they were most needed. They materialised in Scotland near the village of Tannoch, and helped defend locals from the mud beast Werrag, which was at the beck and call of local miser Fergus. The beast was revealed to be a thug in the pay of Fergus, who was hoping to drive the villages away from salvaging diamonds from a crashed aircraft.
