= The Steel Claw (comics) =

Publication information
- Publisher: IPC Magazines/ Quality Comics/Wildstorm (DC Comics)
- First appearance: Valiant #1 (October 6, 1962)
- Created by: Tom Tully; Jesús Blasco

In-story information
- Alter ego: Louis Crandell
- Team affiliations: The Shadow Squad
- Notable aliases: Lewis Randell
- Abilities: Invisibility. Steel Claw containing a different weapon in each finger, the Claw was also remote controlled.

The Steel Claw was one of the most popular comic book heroes of British weekly adventure comics of the 1960s and 1970s. The character was revived in 2005 for Albion, a six-issue mini-series published by the Wildstorm imprint of DC Comics.

== Publishing history ==
The Steel Claw first appeared in the debut edition of Valiant dated 6 October 1962. The strip was one of several put together for the comic by Fleetway editors Ken Mennell, Jack Le Grand and Sid Bicknell, and was then refined by writer Ken Bulmer and artist Jesús Blasco. After the first three serials, Bulmer left the title, and was replaced by Tom Tully. The Steel Claw appeared in Valiant throughout much of the 1960s and was one of the most popular strips in the comic. Tully wrote the series for the remainder of its run. The story ended briefly in May 1970, but a year later was back, retitled Return of the Claw, which would run until 1973.

In 1967, Fleetway featured the character in a number of digest-size original stories in their Stupendous Series of Super Library comics. The Steel Claw would alternate with The Spider from Lion in these books, with the Claw featuring in the odd-numbered editions. Because of the pressures of deadlines, these monthly titles saw a variety of different writers and artists employed, usually various Italian artists, most notably future 2000 AD artist Massimo Belardinelli. These ran until January 1968.

When Valiant merged with Battle Picture Weekly, the strip transferred to Vulcan, from 1975, in a series of reprints. The strip had by now found popularity worldwide, including in Germany, India and Sweden, and it remained in print in these countries long after the character's final appearance in the UK.

The Steel Claw remained fondly remembered by its fans and future comic creators, and during the Alan Moore and Alan Davis run of Captain Britain comic, The Steel Claw was renamed The Iron Tallon for a brief cameo appearance. This was followed by a four issue series published by Quality Comics in 1986, which reprinted material from Valiant (in this, the character's name was edited to 'Louis Randell', and the stories were coloured), with new framing material drawn by Garry Leach.

The character remained in limbo for a number of years until Grant Morrison used The Steel Claw's superhero incarnation (as well as a number of British heroes from the 1960s) in his Zenith strip in 2000AD. This was followed in 1992 by a one-off special featuring The Steel Claw, amongst other 1960s characters, which was created by various 2000AD creators of the time. This however failed to spawn any continuing series, not least because the editors of 2000AD subsequently realised that publishers Fleetway did not own the rights to the character, which were retained by IPC.

The character again entered limbo, until it was announced in 2005 that DC Comics would be using the character along with a number of other IPC characters, in a six issue mini-series called Albion. This would be plotted by Alan Moore, and written by Leah Moore and John Reppion, with art by Shane Oakley and George Freeman. The series was complemented by an album collection, published by Titan Books, reprinting the Ken Bulmer/Jesus Blasco serials from Valiant.

A collection of early stories was published in 2021 by Rebellion's Treasury of British comics imprint.

== Fictional character biography ==
Louis Crandell was the assistant to the scientist Professor Barringer, until a laboratory accident in which he lost his right hand. He then used a prosthetic metal hand to substitute for it. In another laboratory accident, with a new ray, if he received a high voltage electric shock (from power lines, etc.) he would become invisible for a limited period of time, with the exception of his artificial hand.

Crandell initially used his newfound gift to steal, and became a psychotic criminal. In early strips, he was clearly a villain, but he later decided to use his new powers in crime-fighting (it was explained that the accident which made it possible for him to become invisible had temporarily made him insane). He joined a British secret service and espionage agency, known as the Shadow Squad. Armed with his steel claw, which by now was equipped with a variety of weapons and tools in each finger, as well as with his power of invisibility, Louis Crandell battled various criminal geniuses, aliens, and the organisation known as F.E.A.R. (the Federation for Extortion, Assassination and Rebellion).

Louis Crandell briefly donned a metal mesh superhero outfit for a time during his adventures. His claw had a number of inbuilt weapons, amongst them being able to fire missiles and gas along with a built-in radio transmitter and receiver. This was not to last though, and Crandell quickly returned to his secret agent roots. By now his Claw was also remote-controlled and stacked full of gadgets. After retiring from the Shadow Squad, Louis Crandell became a detective, and then a bounty hunter, before distrust of his past eventually led him to go to South America, where he continued to fight crime.

When The Steel Claw was reprinted by Quality Comics, a framing sequence featured Crandell (called Randell in this version) as an aging secret agent reflecting on his early criminal career. His appearance in Zenith saw him disabled during battle, eventually dying from blood loss. This was followed by his appearance in 2000AD Action, where Crandell was portrayed as a burnt-out government assassin.

In Paul Grist's comic, Jack Staff, a character called Ben Kulmer appears as The Claw. This character is a thief who tries to steal the Claw from a museum, only to have it attach itself to his left hand, and then receives the same invisibility powers, as well as added strength and shock powers in the Claw. He is now working as part of a group called "Q".

In the novel Sherlock Holmes y los zombis de Camford ("Sherlock Holmes and the Camford Zombies", Ediciones Dolmen, 2010; ISBN 978-84-938143-4-2) by Spanish author Alberto López Aroca, Steel Claw (Louis Crandell) appears under the name "Lewis Crandle", and his career as an agent of the Shadow Squad (a branch of the Diogenes Club from Arthur Conan Doyle's stories in this version) is sent back to the beginning of the 20th century (the novel takes place in 1903). "Lewis Crandle" appears in this novel alongside a number of other IPC-Fleetway characters (Timothy Jekyll aka Tim Kelly; Seth Pride aka Spider (British comics); Mightech aka Mytek The Mighty; among others).

== Steel Claw around the world ==
The Steel Claw enjoyed wide popularity in Europe and Asia, the adventures featuring the Shadow Squad being the most popular of the series.

=== France ===
The Steel Claw is known as Main d’Acier in France, which literally means "Hand of Steel". In France, several series of The Steel Claw appeared, published by Gémini editions and MCL. The early Steel Claw series appeared in the Gémini editions which were published between 1962 and 1980.

=== Germany ===
In Germany in the 1970s the magazine Vulcan was published under the title Kobra, which used most of IPC's adventure strips, including The Steel Claw, Mytek the Mighty, Kelly's Eye, The Spider, and Robot Archie. However, the stories which were published in Kobra were partly incomplete, switching between stories unpredictably. Finally, the magazine was discontinued, leaving German fans in dismay. For reasons unknown, the Steel Claw's alter ego was named "Bert Crandell" in Germany.

=== Finland ===
Steel Claw was published in Finland in the early 1970s, firstly in a series of digest-sized pocket books, and then as part of Sarjakuvalehti, which had three or four different stories each month. The series were mostly about The Steel Claw's adventures as a Shadow Squad agent. The Steel Claw stories also appeared occasionally in Mustanaamio during the early 1980s.

=== India ===
Steel Claw achieved cult status in India becoming one of India's most popular action heroes. In Tamil Nadu Irumbukkai Maayavi, in Kerala, Irumbukai Mayavi and Urukkukai Maayavi, and in Andhra Pradesh Ukkupidi Maayavi became a popular hero for many millions of fans. In Tamil Nadu The Steel Claw was published by Muthu Comics in 1971, under the license of Fleetway Publications. In the early seventies in Andhra Pradesh, Ukkupidi Maayavi, the Telugu version of Steel Claw comics were sold as a supplement along with a popular Telugu children's monthly magazine. Later Lion Comics published the adventures of Steel Claw in South India.

This series was published in the Hindi monthly magazine Parag under the name fauladi panja.

The series was brought to Kerala by two publishers — Achuthan Book House and Regal Publishers. Kannadi Viswanathan translated Steel Claw as Irumbukai Mayavi for Achuthan Book House; while Thomas Varghese translated the same as Urukkukai Mayavi for Regal Publishers. The tremendous popularity of the series triggered many rip-offs of Steel Claw. CID Michael, CID Moosa and CID Mahesh were the Kerala equivalents of Steel Claw, though their abilities differed. In some comics, these characters would make themselves invisible with a wristwatch switch, supposedly an ultra-modern device. In some comics, Mahesh is invisible except for his iron helmet, a direct influence from the Steel Claw series. CID Moosa by Kannadi Viswanathan became a cult favorite in Kerala and enjoyed popularity during the 1980s. His abilities did not directly mimic that of Steel Claw and hence is considered the first original detective comic series in Malayalam for teenagers. The movie CID Moosa was loosely inspired by this creation of Kannadi Viswanathan.

=== The Netherlands ===
Steel Claw was published in the Netherlands in the pocket (digest sized) comic serie Superstrip as De Stalen Vuist (Steel Fist) since the late 1960s. #1 in this series was actually a Steel Claw story.

=== Sweden ===
Steel Claw was published in Sweden under the name Stålhanden (Steel Hand) from 1969 onwards, in the magazines Swisch (1969-70 - 19 issues published, then absorbed in Serie-Nytt), Serie-Nytt (1970–74), reprints appeared in Seriemagasinet (1977–80), various very early stories thus far unreleased in Sweden are found in its spin-off SM Special (1979–85). Steel Claw episodes appeared sporadically in Seriemagasinet until the late 1990s. Reprints further appeared in Barracuda (1990–91; 9 issues published).

=== Portugal ===
The Steel Claw is known as Garra d'Aço or Garra de Aço in Portugal, literally from the English "Steel Claw". It seems all the stories published in Portugal were signed by the Spanish artist Jesus Blasco.

- Portugal Press: Jaguar (1971) #3; Titã (1973) #2; Lince (1974) #6; Jornal do Cuto (1971) #19-#41
- Agência Portuguesa de Revistas: Ciclone (1972) #565 / Condor Popular #8704
- Mundo de Aventuras: (1966–72) #895; #903; #977; #1013; #1026; #1170

Steel Claw was also distributed in Portugal via Angolan Editorial Globo (1976): Grandes Aventuras #1; #2; #3; #5; #7; #10; #12; #14; #16; #18; #24.

=== The former Yugoslavia ===
In former Yugoslavia The Steel Claw was first printed in 1967 by Croatian publishing house Plavi vjesnik in its Super strip biblioteka edition under the name Čelična pandža. Later the stories were printed in several magazines all over the country until late 1980s. In Serbia it was published under the name Čelična kandža in Gigant, Panorama, Stripoteka, Eks and Denis. Steel Claw was also very popular in the Slovene magazine Zvitorepec (1966-1973), with an estimated peak readership of 300,000 (with about 1.7 million people speaking the language in that time). The Slovene title of the comic was Jeklena pest (transl. Steel Fist).

Yugoslav rock band S.T.R.A.H. (transl. F.E.A.R.) chose their name after the organization from the comic.

=== Steel Claw names ===
Country	Name	Meaning
France	Main d'Acier	Steel Hand
Germany	Eiserne Hand	Iron Hand
Spain	Zarpa de Acero	Steel Claw
Finland	Teräsnyrkki	Steel Fist
Netherlands	Stalen Vuist	Steel Fist
Sweden	Stålhanden	Steel Hand
Portugal	Garra d'Aço / Garra de Aço	Steel Claw
Tamil Nadu (India)	Irumbukkai Maayavi	Iron hand invisible man
Andhra Pradesh (India)	Ukkupidi Maayavi	Steel Fist invisible man
Kerala (India)	Urukkukai Maayavi	Iron hand invisible man
Yugoslavia (Former)	Čelična pandža / Čelična kandža	Steel Claw
Slovenia (in former Yugoslavia)	Jeklena pest / Ni miru za Jekleno pest	Steel Fist / There is no peace for Steel Fist
