= Boixcar =

Spanish cartoonist (1917–1964)

Boixcar (pen name of Guillermo Sánchez Boix; 1917 —1964) was a Spanish comics artist, one of the most prominent figures of the era known as the Golden Age of Spanish comics (mid-20th century).

== Biography ==
He was born in Barcelona, and began his career in the mid-1940s. His first comics include El Caballero Negro ("The Black Knight", 1945), El Puma (1946), and La Vuelta al Mundo de dos Muchachos ("The Two Boys' Return to the World", 1948).

He gained popularity with his comic book Hazañas Bélicas ("War Deeds", first issue in 1948, second one in 1950). It drew inspiration from the recent events of World War II (and later of the Korean War), with an accent placed on human values expressed in the most desperate situations, the sentimentalism of the action being in contrast with the spectacularly realistic depiction of weapons and vehicles. The Hazañas' success made the editor issue another in the series, as Hazañas Bélicas Extra, increased in content that due to Boixcar's collaboration with several other artists on the project.

Boixcar was at ease with other themes, as shown by his contributions to the series El Mundo Futuro ("Future World", from 1956), Flecha Negra ("Black Arrow") and Murciélago ("Bat").

Boixcar died in 1964, without having reached the age of 50.
