= One-Eyed Jack (comics) =

- Cover of 2017 collection. Art by John Cooper (from cover of Valiant, 27 December 1975).

Publication information
- Publisher: Former; IPC Media (Fleetway); Current; Rebellion Developments
- First appearance: Valiant (20 December 1975)
- Created by: John Wagner (writer); John Cooper (artist)

In-story information
- Full name: Jackson Delaware McBane
- Team affiliations: New York City Police Department (fictional 94th precinct); Military Intelligence Agency

One-Eyed Jack was a comic strip that appeared in the British anthology Valiant from December 1975 to October 1976, and then later in Battle Picture Weekly. It was about a tough New York detective called Jack McBane. The strip was created by Valiant editor and writer John Wagner and artist John Cooper.

== History ==
In 1975 Valiant was struggling as its sales figures fell, and it was in danger of being cancelled. John Wagner was asked to take over as editor and reinvigorate the title with better, more hard-hitting stories. At the time, Wagner was the editor of a girls' comic, but he had previously helped to set up and launch Battle, a boys' war comic. One-Eyed Jack was one of the new stories Wagner introduced to Valiant, and he wrote all of the episodes which appeared in Valiant. It was inspired by the 1971 film Dirty Harry and other police films and television shows. The first episode appeared in the 20 December 1975 issue, and it immediately became the most popular story in the comic. Wagner attributes this in part to Cooper's artwork. In his introduction to the 2017 trade paperback collection, he wrote: "The impact of the story was in huge measure boosted by the slick, superb artwork of John Cooper... The characters and the city came to life".

The lead character was Detective Jack McBane, who lost his left eye when he was shot by a robber in the first episode. After ten years of doing police work "by the book", McBane became ruthless and willing to do whatever it took to beat the criminals he encountered. Each episode was three or four pages long, and usually contained a complete story, although there were some two- or three-episode stories. The weekly episodes were in black and white, but there was a full-colour episode in the 1978 Valiant Annual (published in 1977). Wagner later said: "I did the first script then handed the character over to someone else and just read all the scripts as they came in".

After ten months, Valiant was merged into Battle on 23 October 1976, and Wagner's involvement with the strip ended. It continued to appear in Battle, written by Gerry Finley-Day and others, and John Cooper continued to provide the art. McBane left the police force and became a spy for the US military.

After the strip ended, it was reprinted in Eagle comic, starting in July 1983 and ending in December 1984 (issues 68 to 143). Some episodes were also reprinted in 2000 AD annuals.

In 2017 all of the Valiant episodes were collected in a graphic novel by Rebellion's Treasury of British Comics imprint.

=== Inspiration for Judge Dredd ===
In 1977, Wagner went on to create the strip Judge Dredd for 2000 AD. In a 1995 interview he said: "When Pat [Mills] was putting together 2000 AD, we realised from the success of "One-Eyed Jack" this was the kind of story the paper should have – a really hard, tough cop". In 2017 he wrote: "The lessons I learned from One-Eyed Jack played no little part in the creation of Judge Dredd".

In 2023 McBane appeared in episodes of Judge Dredd in a time-travel story written by Ken Niemand and illustrated by Ian Richardson, Kieran McKeown and Quinton Winter (in the Judge Dredd Megazine #452–#457).

== Recurring characters ==
- Detective Jack McBane
- Detective Willy Novak, McBane's partner
- Lieutenant Joseph Carrelli, McBane's superior in the NYPD
- Ed Calucchi, McBane's partner in the Military Intelligence Agency
- General Mantis, head of the MIA

== Sources ==
- "One-Eyed Jack: Top of the Cops," by Karl Stock, in Judge Dredd Megazine #385 (July 2017)
- One-Eyed Jack, Introduction by John Wagner (Rebellion, 2017), ISBN 978-1-78108-572-1
- Judge Dredd: The Mega-History by Colin M. Jarman and Peter Acton (Lennard Publishing, 1995), ISBN 1-85291-128-X, p. 17
