= Kelly's Eye =

Kelly's Eye is a British adventure comic strip. It first appeared in Knockout in 1962, moved to Valiant in 1963, and lasted until sometime in 1974. The strip was revived in 2000 AD in 1991–1993. Tim Kelly possesses a jewel, the Eye of Everlasting Life, which protects him from death by granting him invulnerability.

== Publication history ==
Kelly’s Eye was published in Knockout from 21 July 1962 to 16 February 1963, and in Valiant (which absorbed Knockout) from 23 February 1963 to 18 May 1974. Scripts were by Tom Tully and the art was initially by Francisco Solano López. From 20 October 1962, Tom Kerr took over the art chores until the penultimate issue of Knockout, with Mike Western filling-in for the final issue. Following the merger with Valiant, the art was once more largely by Solano López, although Tom Kerr filled-in on several occasions. A number of the strips were subsequently reprinted in Vulcan in 1975–1976.

In 1991, the character was revived by the creative team of Alan McKenzie, Brett Ewins, and Zac Sandler, in 2000 AD's Universal Soldier strip, running until 1993, when the publishers realised they no longer had the IPC rights to the character. Before then, in April 1992, a 2000 AD Action Special featured six strips reviving classic British comics characters; of these only Kelly's Eye also had appeared in 2000 AD proper.

In the 2005–2006 limited series Albion, the Eye of Zoltec is shown to have been in the possession of the British Prime Minister since the time of Margaret Thatcher.

== Fictional character biography ==
Englishman Tim Kelly was in South America to claim a fortune left by a deceased uncle. He saves the life of an old man, who in gratitude takes him to the Temple of Zoltec, where Kelly receives the gem known as the Eye of Everlasting Life or the "Eye of Zoltec". As long as Kelly wears the gem around his neck, he has superhuman powers, including invulnerability and certain mental powers (including total recall).

Kelly uses his powers to become an adventuring hero, some of which involve battling his arch-enemy, Diablo, wielder of his gem's twin, the "Left Eye of Zoltec".

Later, Kelly is joined by Doctor Diamond, an Edwardian frock coat-wearing inventor who journeys through time and space with the aid of his "Time Clock".

== In popular culture ==
An analogue of Tim Kelly, "Tom Rosetta", owner of the "Rosetta Stone", is one of the characters killed by The Fury during Alan Moore and Alan Davis' run on Captain Britain.

Similarly, Helen Morgan of Paul Grist's Jack Staff series wears the "Valiant Stone" around her neck, which grants her similar powers to Kelly.
