= Valiant (comics) =

British weekly comic

- The cover of Valiant, dated 9 July 1966.

Publication information
- Publisher: IPC Magazines
- Schedule: Weekly
- Format: Ongoing series
- Genre: Action/adventure
- Publication date: 6 October 1962 – 16 October 1976
- No. of issues: 712
- Main character(s): Captain Hurricane; Billy Bunter; Sexton Blake; The Steel Claw; The House of Dolmann; One-Eyed Jack

Creative team
- Written by: Scott Goodall; Tom Tully
- Artist(s): Reg Parlett; Jesús Blasco; Eric Bradbury; John Cooper; Mike Western
- Editor(s): Steve Barker; Tony Power; Stewart Wales; John Wagner; Steve MacManus (sub-editor)

Valiant was a weekly British comics periodical published by Fleetway Publications and later IPC Magazines from 4 October 1962 to 16 October 1976. A boys' adventure comic, it debuted numerous memorable characters, including Captain Hurricane, The Steel Claw and Mytek the Mighty. Valiant lasted for 712 issues before being merged with stablemate Battle Picture Weekly.

== Creation ==
Having taken over Amalgamated Press in 1959 to profit from their boys' comics sales, the Mirror Group decided on the launch of a new title to join the likes of Lion, Tiger, Buster and Knockout in their portfolio, now under the name Fleetway Publications. Knockout was the elder statesman of the line, having been running since 1939; the venerable title had received a modernising makeover in 1960, and Fleetway were keen to apply the same principles used in the relaunch to a new title. At the direction of Fleetway executive Jack Le Grand, group editor Sid Bicknell assigned editors Steve Barker and Tony Power to the new comic, designed to compete with DC Thomson's smash-hit The Victor.

== Publication history ==
Valiant launched on 6 October 1962, with a Geoff Campion cover depicting new headline star Captain Hurricane and a free 'Pocket Rocket' and football League Ladders. The new comic eschewed prose stories (by then largely gone from Fleetway's other titles) in favour of comic serials and strips, interspersed with factual pages and, in later issues, letters from readers. The comic led strips based on the typical boys' adventure mix of the time - war, westerns, sport and fantasy. "Captain Hurricane" was a light-hearted World War II series depicting the adventures of Royal Marines Captain Hercules Hurricane and his long-suffering batman 'Maggot' Malone. Already a towering heavyweight, Hurricane's short temper would see him pitched into "ragin' furies" that blessed him with the power to cut an unarmed swathe through German troops and tie tank barrels in knots. Hugely popular with readers, Captain Hurricane would be a constant presence throughout the magazine's life.

More straight-laced military history was provided by "To Glory We Steer", modified versions of The Comet's Horatio Nelson biographical naval warfare story, and "Blade of the Frontier". Another reprint was highwayman actioner "Jack o' Justice", brought over from Radio Fun and actually a modified version of Sun's "Dick Turpin". Despite this cut-price origin, the feature proved popular enough with readers that when the Dick Turpin inventory ran dry in 1964, new Jack O'Justice adventures were commissioned, with Tom Kerr among the artists. Meanwhile "Hawk Hunter and the Iron Horse" saw the former - raised by native Americans but "a white man at heart" - hired by Union Pacific to protect the latter. "Paladin the Fearless" told the story of a young boy raised as a champion of the English against Viking invaders; the story was actually a loosely translated import of Albert Uderzo's Belloy. "Kid Gloves" meanwhile told the story of its eponymous hero, a "gentle giant" who becomes a boxer.

More fantastical was "The Steel Claw", created by Ken Bulmer and telling the story of metal-handed and embittered laboratory assistant Louis Crandell. After an accident during one of boss Professor Barrington's experiments, Crandell develops the ability to turn invisible (aside from the eponymous appendage) and promptly went on the rampage to make the world pay for its perceived wrongs against him. The character proved an instant hit with readers and in February 1963 underwent a drastic change of outlook, putting his abilities into the fight for good, with Tom Tully taking over as writer. One of the story's most memorable features was the dark, atmospheric art by political exile Jesús Blasco, which has been cited as an influence by Brian Bolland and Alan Davis. Light relief meanwhile was provided by no less than six cartoon strips - Angel Nadal's "The Nutts", "The Soppy H'Porths" by Arthur Martin, "Hey Presto" and a trio of Reg Parlett contributions in "Percy the Problem Child", "Shorty the Sheriff" and "The Crows". The 32-page, 6d Valiant launched to strong sales, with the following three issues aiming for loyalty with further gifts - batches of cardboard tabs for the first issue's league ladders, a Giant Book of World War 2 and a magnifying glass.

=== Valiant and Knockout ===
The line-up would stay stable until February 1963, when Valiant would undergo the first of what would be six mergers; the first victim was Knockout, which had been comprehensively outsold by Valiant since the new title launched. The merger brought four new stories to Valiant. "Kelly's Eye" revolved around adventurer Tim Kelly, who discovered a gem called the Eye of Zoltec that made him indestructible. For reasons best known to himself, Kelly chose to keep the talisman around his neck on a thin chain. Drawn by Argentine artist Francisco Solano López, "Kelly's Eye" would run until 1974. Less enduring were the dinosaur-rearing schemes of Doctor Kraken, though the scientist would appear until September 1964. The third addition was also relatively short-lived, the continued adventures of secret agent Nick Shadow in "The Man Called 39" lasting only three months. More enduring were the cartoons. The perpetual travails of 'Heavyweight Chump of Greyfriars' Billy Bunter lasted as long as Valiant did, while Reg Wootton's "Sporty" - depicting the title character's multidisciplinary ambitions usually winning out of the caddish antics of friend Sidney - would make appearances until 1972. The cover bore the moniker of Valiant and Knockout until 22 February 1964. Another new feature added in 1963 was "Little Fred and Big Ed". This was another Uderzo import, roughly translated versions of Asterix, which ran in Valiant until 1964. Fleetway would subsequently try to gain further mileage from the Asterix strips in Ranger and Look and Learn converting the Gauls to Britons, before Anthea Bell and Derek Hockridge's faithful, definitive English translations began in 1970.

1963 had also seen an expansion of the use of Valiant as a brand. An ubiquitous annual for the title debuted in autumn 1963, while following year saw the debut of the digest-sized Valiant Picture Library. The latter rarely featured characters from the weekly, instead focusing on a steady diet of war action. Later spin-offs using the name included the Valiant Story of the West, The Valiant Space Annual and The Valiant Book of Pirates, while periodic specials (sometimes in conjunction with 'rival' Lion) were also issued. The Steel Claw meanwhile featured in another series of digests, alternating with The Spider from Lion. Initially titled Fantastic Series before being retitled Stupendous Series, it ran from January 1967 to January 1968.

The following year would see three popular stories debut. The sport quota was topped up by "The Wild Wonders" - drawn by Mike Western in an influential cartoon style, and featuring Hebrides brothers Rick and Charlie Wild using their privation-ridden upbringing to dominate the world of athletics - and "Legge's Eleven", which saw player-manager Ted Legge try to assemble a team for Division Four strugglers Rockley Rovers. The third was another fantasy-tinged strip, "Mytek the Mighty". This concerned the construction of a huge robotic ape, built by Professor Arnold Boyce to communicate with the primitive Akabi tribe of Central Africa. However, Mytek was stolen by the scientist's assistant, the evil dwarf Gogra, and taken on a destructive tour around the world, pursued by Boyce and agent Dick Mason. Drawn by Eric Bradbury, the story would run until 1970.

Valiant expanded to 40 pages in May 1964 - a format that saw the debut of "Twelve Guilty Men", which saw disgraced police officer Rod Marsden to clear his name by bringing underworld syndicate Crime Incorporated to justice. Later that year Valiant's only prose story, "The Astounding Jason Hyde", first appeared. The crimefighter with x-ray eyes was written by science fiction writer Barrington J. Bayley, with illustrations by Bradbury, and appeared in Valiant until 1968. Bradbury would contribute to another popular fantasy-tinged strip in 1966; "The House of Dolmann" told of robotics genius Eric Dolmann, who fought crime with his squad of robot 'puppets', including sumo wrestler Togo, miniature Commando Raider and jester Giggler, and featured until 1970. Meanwhile Jack O'Justice received a revamp, switching to present day adventures featuring the character's grandson, Jack Justice. The comic's circulation was around 500,000 copies. While popular, it was not without critics; a 1965 journal published by the Scottish Academic Press on the subject of The Use of English Language bemoaned the slang and shoddy grammar of characters from "brash" titles like Valiant while the terms Captain Hurricane used for Axis Powers soldiers some twenty years after they ceased to be enemies has also been noted. IPC's editorial director John Sanders would later defend the high amount of World War II content in Valiant and other titles, arguing that readers' appetite for such material meant it was necessary to keep the comics profitable.

In 1969, Fleetway were purchased by Reed International and rebranded as IPC Magazines. Initially, Valiant was largely unaffected by the changes, which also brought former competitor Odhams Press brought under the same umbrella. The same year saw a revival of long-running pulp detective Sexton Blake to take advantage of the successful television show based on the character, starring Laurence Payne. Another new arrival was "Raven on the Wing", featuring a young Gypsy footballer and drawn by Solano López. 1970 would bring something of a sea change as "Sexton Blake", "Mytek the Mighty", "The House of Dolmann" and the long-serving "The Steel Claw" all ended. Replacements such as haunted house caper "The Ghostly Guardian", science fiction story "The Trouble-Seekers" and even Tully-Blasco collaboration "Slave of the Screamer" failed to catch on.

=== Valiant and Smash! ===
The following year brought a second merger. This time Smash! was subsumed; at the time it was the last of Odhams' Power Comics line, but even shedding the unpopular Marvel Comics reprints that led to its stablemates downfall had not been enough. Valiant and Smash launched on 10 April 1971. The combination saw Valiant inherit the popular "The Incredible Adventures of Janus Stark", featuring tales of a rubber-boned Victorian escapologist and crime-fighter. Another strip drawn by Solano López and primarily written by Tully, it would be a fixture for the next five years. The other strips from the Smash! intake - "His Sporting Lordship" and "Simon Test and the Islands of Peril" - were less long lived, not running past the end of the year. Louis Crandell however returned for sequel series "Return of the Claw" until 1973.

=== Valiant and TV21 ===
Two weeks after abandoning the Valiant and Smash title, the comic also absorbed the last remnants of TV21. The latter's declining fortunes meant this merger only brought Angus Allan and John Stokes' licensed Star Trek strip and "Tuffs of Terror Island"; the title's Marvel reprints were again not continued. The name Valiant and TV21 would last until April 1974, before the magazine reverted to plain Valiant once more.

=== Valiant and Lion ===
This would last until 1974, when Lion's 22-year run ended and it folded into Valiant. The merge was not without controversy; Lion assistant editor Chris Lowder has stated it was outselling Valiant at the time, and that Le Grand – having advanced to managing director of Fleetway – ensured the comic he had helped devise survived. Lowder recalled he and fellow Lion editor Geoff Kemp took Le Grand to lunch to state their case, and were told they "just had to facking [sic] deal with it". Arrivals from Lion included the popular Adam Eterno, as well as reprints of "Robot Archie" and "Spot the Clue with Zip Nolan", while the Steel Commando would guest-star in "Captain Hurricane". The comic would run under the name Valiant and Lion until 22 March 1975, and sales were typically around 100,000 an issue. Future 2000 AD creator John Wagner took over from Stewart Wales as editor in 1975, with Steve MacManus as sub-editor; the team were given the task of updating Valiant for modern audiences, giving it a gritter tone. Among the strips they commissioned were "Death Wish" (a World War II story, not to be confused with the later Speed/Tiger/Eagle strip of the same name) and hard-edged New York detective story "One-Eyed Jack" (both written by Wagner). The latter character was heavily influenced by Clint Eastwood's Dirty Harry, and has sometimes been considered a forebear of Judge Dredd.

=== Valiant and Vulcan ===
However, the decision to merge Valiant and Lion was a worrying sign of the shrinking market. Increasing competition from television led to a smaller market for boys' comics, as well as the market also having to deal with Marvel UK's anthologies gaining a foothold. The boys' adventure comic was becoming outdated in comparison. Valiant would assimilate one more stablemate, however - the small-format Vulcan in April 1976. As Vulcan was a reprint title (including some strips that had previously ran in Valiant) the change in content was minimal - for three weeks Valiant and Vulcan carried a double-folded mini-comic insert finishing off the storylines running when Vulcan was cancelled. Despite this, the Valiant and Vulcan title would stick until 2 October 1976.

=== Battle Picture Weekly and Valiant ===
While the comic reverted to simply on Valiant on 9 October 1976 the change was short-lived. The following issue provided "Important news for all readers" and announced the title would be consumed by Battle Picture Weekly the following week. Battle revolved around war comics and so there was little room for Valiant's contents, with only "One-Eyed Jack", "Soldier Sharp - The Rat of the Rifles" and "The Black Crow" were continued. Captain Hurricane retired from frontline combat to host the letters page. As with other cancelled weeklies, annuals would continue for some afterwards - the final Valiant Annual was dated 1984.

== Legacy ==
Valiant characters have appeared prominently in several revivals of the AP/Fleetway/IPC characters. New episodes of "The Steel Claw", "Kelly's Eye", "Captain Hurricane" and "Janus Stark" appeared in the 1990 Classic Action Holiday Special. Two years later reimagined versions of "Kelly's Eye", "The Steel Claw" and "Mytek the Mighty" were included in the 2000 AD Action Special. In 2006 several played prominent roles in the WildStorm mini-series Albion, which also used a fictional issue of Valiant as a key plot point.

In March 2012, Royal Mail launched a special stamp collection to celebrate Britain's rich comic book history. The collection featured Valiant, along with The Beano, The Dandy, Eagle, The Topper, Roy of the Rovers, Bunty, Buster, Twinkle and 2000 AD. Several stories from Valiant have been collected by Titan Publishing Group, and as part of the Treasury of British Comics by Rebellion Developments, who have owned the complete Valiant library since 2018.

== Title ==
- Valiant 6 October 1962 to 16 February 1963
- Valiant and Knockout 23 February 1963 to 22 February 1964
- Valiant 29 February 1964 to 3 April 1971
- Valiant and Smash! 10 April to 18 September 1971
- Valiant 25 September 1971
- Valiant and TV21 2 October 1971 to 20 April 1974
- Valiant 27 April 1974 to 18 May 1974
- Valiant and Lion 25 May 1974 to 22 March 1975
- Valiant 29 March 1975 to 3 April 1976
- Valiant and Vulcan 10 April to 2 October 1976
- Valiant 9 October to 16 October 1976
- Battle Picture Weekly and Valiant 23 October 1976 to 1 October 1977

== Spinoffs ==
The cover of the 1975 Valiant Annual

- Valiant Picture Library (144 issues, June 1963 to May 1969)
- Valiant Annual (21 issues, 1964 to 1984)
- Valiant Story of the West (2 issues, 1966)
- Valiant Summer Special (5 issues, 1966 to 1970)
- Valiant Space Special (2 issues, 1967 to 1968)
- Lion and Valiant Special Extra (3 issues, 1968 to 1970)
- The Valiant Book of Pirates (1968)
- The Valiant Book of TV's Sexton Blake (1969)
- The Valiant Book of Conquest of the Air (1970)
- Valiant and Smash! Summer Special (1971)
- Valiant and TV21 Summer Special (2 issues, 1972 to 1973)
- The Valiant Book of Sports (1973)
- Valiant Holiday Special (15 issues, 1974 to 1980)
- The Valiant Book of Magic & Mystery (1976)
- The Valiant Book of Weapons & War (1976)
