= Janus Stark =

Publication information
- Publisher: IPC Magazines (UK); Mon Journal (France); WildStorm
- First appearance: Smash! (15 March 1969)
- Created by: Tom Tully and Francisco Solano López

In-story information
- Full name: Jonas Clarke
- Abilities: Flexible bone structure; escapologist

Janus Stark, or The Incredible Adventures of Janus Stark, is a British comic strip series, originally written by Tom Tully and drawn by Francisco Solano López. It is about an escapologist in Victorian London who appears to be simply an unusual act on the music hall stage, but who privately uses his extraordinary abilities to battle against injustice. The strip debuted on 15 March 1969 in Smash! and ran in that title until 1971, when it moved to Valiant, running for another four years until 1975.

The character was later revived in France, running in his own title until the mid-1980s.

== Publication history ==
Solano López was a foreign illustrator, born in Argentina, who worked at a studio in Spain. For reasons of cost, IPC had taken a policy decision to source artwork from cheaper sources outside the UK. The strip was one of the few to survive the merger of Smash! into Valiant in 1971, running in that title from 10 April 1971 to 22 March 1975. With the move, the scripts were taken over by Angus Allan with art by the studio of Solano López.

The Incredible Adventures of Janus Stark was reprinted and translated into French in his own title, published by Mon Journal, beginning in 1973. When the publication ran out of reprint material, they created new adventures, lasting until issue #89 (May 1986).

== Fictional character biography ==
The protagonist was born in 1840 as the orphan Jonas Clarke. His background story explains that he was sent to an orphanage where he was mistreated, but escaped and lived in the streets. There he befriended a beggar, Blind Largo, who taught him pickpocketing, but also trained Clarke's unique gift for body bending and escaping. Stark has an unusually flexible bone structure, enabling him to get out of an astonishing variety of tight situations at need. (Note: There is more than a touch of Reed Richards of the Fantastic Four in Stark's uncanny abilities. Fantastic Four reprints ran in Smash! before Janus Stark debuted.)

As an adult, Clarke takes on another persona as Janus Stark and becomes an escapologist and private detective.

=== Later appearance ===
Janus Stark appears in the six-issue limited series Albion (2005) by Alan Moore, Leah Moore, John Reppion, Shane Oakley, and George Freeman. In this "new" two-page adventure, he is imprisoned, along with at least Spring-heeled Jack and Joseph Merrick (the Elephant Man), by an Inspector Bryant, simply for being thought by the Victorian government to be "dangerous individuals." Stark succeeds in breaking them all out of prison.

Stark also appears in the first issue of the Smash! mini-series in 2023.

== In popular culture ==
The British punk band Janus Stark based its name on this comic strip.

On the Series K, episode 5 of QI, Alan Davies sparks a tangent discussion about a superhero he remembers from "Valiant Comics" called Janus, who he describes as an "escapologist who can get through tiny gaps". Davis noted that every week Janus seemed to be in a situation where the solution was for him to get through a tiny gap.
