= Vulcan (British comics) =

- The cover to the 27 September 1975 edition of Vulcan, the first to be distributed nationwide.

Publication information
- Publisher: IPC Magazines; Genacur
- Schedule: Weekly
- Format: Standard
- Genre: Action/adventure
- Publication date: 1 March 1975 – 3 April 1976
- No. of issues: 28 (Scotland only); 28 (nationwide); 1 special (1 July 1976); 1 annual (1 January 1977)
- Editor: Sid Bicknell

Vulcan was a British weekly boys' comic published by IPC Magazines from 1 March 1975 to 3 April 1976, when it merged with Valiant. The comic was unusual among IPC's weeklies for several reasons – it used a much smaller format than most of the company's weeklies and featured more colour; until September 1975 the title was only available in Scotland as the format was tested; and it consisted entirely of reprints of extant material. It was also published simultaneously in German as Kobra.

== Publishing history ==
Swiss publisher Gevacur had released reprinted Fleetway material with some success in mainland Europe, and co-operated with IPC for Vulcan, the title being released as Kobra in mainland Europe. The title allowed Fleetway to make use of its back-catalogue of superhero and adventure strips printed in boys' adventure titles during the 1960s and early 1970s, and the magazine was printed in Germany. It was compiled by British-based staff in the form of editors Sid Bicknell, with art editor Jan Shepherd.

Much emphasis was placed on the 7p price corresponding with the seven features, and due to the relatively low overheads from the lack of new material the 32-page Vulcan was potentially profitable with a print run of around 25,000 copies, a number far below what was viable for other IPC weeklies. Format-wise, it was a departure for British comics of the period, being almost the same size as an American comic (Vulcan issues are slightly larger than US standard comic books) and featuring glossy paper, rather than the newspaper format and newsprint used on other British weeklies; as a result the original artwork often had to be resized or otherwise edited. This was not appreciated by many of the material's original artists.

The title was initially printed in Scotland only to test its viability, with the first issue being dated 1 March 1975. After 28 issues, following the 20 September 1975 edition the title was switched to nationwide - and as a result in-progress stories were edited to conclude so the 27 September 1975 edition could begin with jump-on points for readers in England, Wales and Northern Ireland. However, only 29 national issues followed before the title was cancelled, following the 3 April 1976 issue. A Holiday Special was also published, as was a single annual - which again was unusual in format for the British market by being softback rather than hardcover. The annual also included some new text stories.

After cancellation the title was merged with the still-running Valiant, with a select group of stories being concluded in an insert section over the first three editions of the renamed Valiant and Vulcan. Valiant editor John Wagner was not impressed by the merger, which brought few additional readers to the merged title.

== Stories ==
Each issue had seven major features, occasionally rounded out with short humour strips or adverts for other Fleetway comics whenever a gap arose.

=== Billy's Boots ===
Published: 27 March to 3 April 1976
Writer: Fred Baker
Artist: John Gillatt

After discovering the ancient boots of former footballer Charles 'Dead Shot' Keen, young Billy Dane finds himself playing with the skill of the late England International.

- Reprinted from Scorcher 10 to 31 January 1970. New episodes of the story were being published concurrently in Tiger.

=== The House of Dolmann ===
Published: 6 to 13 and 27 December 1975
Writer: Tom Tully
Artist: Eric Bradbury

Genius Eric Dolmann creates a miniature army of robots to help him fight crime.

- Reprinted from Valiant 8 to 22 October 1966.

=== Kelly's Eye ===
Published: 1 March 1975 to 3 April 1976
Writer: Tom Tully
Artist: Francisco Solano López, Tom Kerr, Selby Donnison

Tim Kelly discovers the Eye of Zoltec, which grants him the power of indestructibility.

- Reprinted from Knockout 21 July 1962 to 16 February 1963 and Valiant 25 April 1964 to 15 April 1967.

=== Mytek the Mighty ===
Published: 1 March 1975 to 3 April 1976
Writer: Tom Tully
Artist: Eric Bradbury

Professor Arnold Boyce builds a huge robot version of the Akari tribe's god Mytek to make contact with the isolated natives; however, his bitter assistant steals Mytek and causes chaos, with the Professor and agent Dick Mason in pursuit.

- Colour versions of strips from Valiant 26 September 1964 to 16 October 1965.

=== Raven on the Wing ===
Published: 13 December 1975
Writer: Tom Tully
Artist: Eric Bradbury

Gypsy boy Raven joins struggling Highboro' United, where his skills soon help turn the team around despite his eccentricities and superstitions, which included insisting on playing barefoot.

- Reprinted from Valiant Summer Special 1969.

=== The Rise and Fall of the Trigan Empire ===
Published: 1 March 1975 to 3 April 1976
Writers: Mike Butterworth
Artist: Don Lawrence

Tales from the alien culture of Elekton in which futuristic technology, such as antigravity vehicles and energy ray weapons, was blended with architecture, dress, and customs reminiscent of ancient civilizations.

- Reprinted from Ranger 18 September 1965 to 18 June 1966 and Look and Learn 25 June 1966 to 14 March 1970. New episodes of the story were being published concurrently in Look and Learn at the time.

=== Robot Archie ===
Published: 1 March 1975 to 3 April 1976
Writers: Ted Cowan
Artist: Bert Bus

Pals Ted Ritchie and Ken Dale are given control of a powerful robot created by Ritchie's uncle.

- Translated from Sjors, including both redrawn versions of strips from Lion 20 April 1968 to 16 May 1970 and two stories - "The Ice Time" and "Mr. Magneto" created for the Dutch market.

=== Saber, King of the Jungle ===
Published: 1 March 1975 to 20 March 1976
Artist: Joe Colquhoun, Denis McLoughlin

Raised in the wild, white man Saber and his Zulu friend Umbala protect the jungle from all manner of threats.

- Reprinted from Tiger 17 June 1967 to 29 March 1969.

=== The Spider ===
Published: 1 March 1975 to 3 April 1976
Writers: Ted Cowan, Jerry Siegel
Artist: Reg Bunn

The Spider is a master criminal of hazy origins who uses his genius and his army of crime - including safe cracking idiot savant Roy Ordini and amoral scientist Prof Pelham – to become the 'King of Crooks'.

- Reprinted from Lion 26 June 1965 to 24 December 1966.

=== The Steel Claw ===
Published: 1 March 1975 to 3 April 1976
Writer: Kenneth Bulmer, Tom Tully
Artist: Jesús Blasco

Louis Crandell gains the ability to turn invisible when he receives an electric shock through his metal hand.

- Reprinted from Valiant 6 October 1962 to 27 March 1965.
