= Captain Hurricane (comics) =

- Cover of 1972 Valiant Annual with Captain Hurricane.

Publication information
- Publisher: Fleetway Publications
- First appearance: Valiant #1 (October 6, 1962)

In-story information
- Alter ego: Captain Hercules Hurricane
- Team affiliations: Steel Commando, Royal Marines Commandos
- Partnerships: "Maggot" Malone
- Abilities: Super strength when enraged

Captain Hurricane was a fictional comic book character in Fleetway Publications' Valiant during the 1960s and 1970s, first appearing in issue #1 (Oct 1962). Captain Hurricane's adventures were scripted by the likes of Scott Goodall and Desmond Pride; Jon Rose and Terry Magee also wrote some stories in the 1970s. R. Charles Roylance drew the strip for many years.

Hercules Hurricane was a former ship's captain who subsequently joined the British Royal Marines Commandos, fighting against the German and Japanese armed forces in the 2nd World War. With his batman, "Maggot" Malone (previously a ship's cook), he battled the Axis powers with his superhuman strength that appeared whenever he became enraged.

After the Captain Hurricane strip ended in 1976, he was listed as "editor" of Battle for many years.

A similar character, named simply "Hurricane", appears in Paul Grist's Jack Staff series; Captain Hurricane himself is portrayed as a prison guard in the 2006 limited series Albion, published by DC/WildStorm.
