= Tom Tully (writer) =

British writer (died 2013)

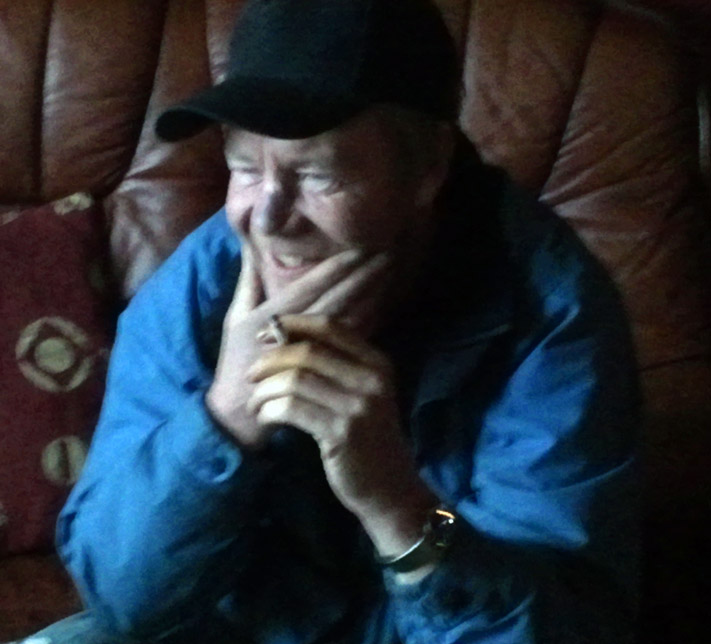
- Born: Thomas Tully Glasgow, Scotland, UK
- Died: 2013 U.K.
- Area: Writer
- Notable works: Roy of the Rovers; The Steel Claw; Kelly's Eye; Johnny Red; The Leopard from Lime Street
- Collaborators: Francisco Solano López, Eric Bradbury, Mike Western, Joe Colquhoun, Dave Gibbons

Tom Tully (died 2013) was a noted British comic writer, mostly of sports and action-adventure stories. He was the longest-running writer of the popular football-themed strip Roy of the Rovers, which he wrote for much of Roy Race's playing career until the weekly comic closed in 1993. Other notable strips penned by Tully included The Steel Claw, The House of Dolmann, The Incredible Adventures of Janus Stark, The Leopard from Lime Street, The Robo Machines, and Harlem Heroes. During his three-decade career, Tully wrote exclusively for what became known as the IPC line of publishers: Amalgamated Press/Odhams/Longacre Press/Fleetway/IPC Magazines.

== Biography ==
Tom Tully was born in Glasgow, but grew up in Reading, Berkshire (where he became a supporter of Newcastle United). He worked as a telephone operator for the Royal Air Force as part of his national service. After a series of civil service jobs and earning a diploma in writing for children, he embarked on a freelance writing career. His first sale was at age 25 — a Buck Rogers story.

From 1963 to 1970, Tully was the principal writer on The Steel Claw for Valiant with artist Jesús Blasco, taking over for the fourth serial from Ken Bulmer, and later returning from 1971 to 1973 for the sequel strip, Return of the Claw. In the early 1960s, he wrote Heros the Spartan with art by Frank Bellamy for Eagle. Another one of his most notable strips for Valiant was The Wild Wonders, drawn by Mike Western, about a pair of wild boys, brought up by animals, who turn out to be fantastic athletes. He also worked on Kelly's Eye and Janus Stark (both with Francisco Solano López) in the 1960s. (Note: According to the first printing of Paul Scoones' The Comic Strip Companion (2012), Tully was also the regular writer on the Doctor Who strip in TV Comic prior to 1966; however, subsequent research suggests that Scones had confused Tully with another comics writer of this period, Thomas Woodman.)

Tully wrote his first scripts for Roy of the Rovers in 1969, and wrote the comic sporadically until 1974 when he was given the permanent job as lead writer, a position he held for nearly 20 years. During that time, the strip moved from Tiger to its own self-titled comic.

In the 1970s and '80s, Tully worked on Johnny Red for Battle Picture Weekly. He worked on many 2000 AD projects including Dan Dare, and the sports-related Harlem Heroes and Mean Arena. He also created The Mind of Wolfie Smith for Tornado, which later transferred to 2000 AD.

Tully also wrote three cricket-themed short novels in 1986 and 1987 - The Magnificent 11 (ISBN 978-0-583-30921-9), Dangerous Game, and Showdown at Seabank (ISBN 978-0-583-30922-6). These books followed the adventures of a young teenager Terry Mason and his friends who started their own cricket club after losing a season at their school. The first and last book are available, however Dangerous Game appears very difficult to find.

Tully wrote the Roy of the Rovers strip until the main comic's demise in 1993, with the final incident of Roy's playing career coming when he lost control of his helicopter and crashed into a field. After the closure of Roy of the Rovers, Tully had very few comics credits. He retired to Wiltshire in the West Country.

He died in Autumn 2013.

== Bibliography ==
Comics work includes:

=== Action/adventure strips ===
- 1962–1971 Kelly's Eye:
  - in Knockout (with artist Francisco Solano López, 1962–1963)
  - in Valiant (1963–1971)
- 1962–1964 Heros the Spartan (with art by Frank Bellamy, in Eagle)
- c. 1962 The Guinea Pig (in Eagle)
- 1963–1973 The Steel Claw (with art by Jesús Blasco, in Valiant)
  - Return of The Steel Claw (in Valiant, 1971–1973)
- 1963–1964 Pike Mason (in Boys' World)
- 1964–c. 1969 Mytek the Mighty: (with Bill Lacey and Eric Bradbury, in Valiant, first appearance September 26th, 1964)
- 1966–1970 The House of Dolmann (with art by Eric Bradbury, in Valiant)
- 1969–1971 The Incredible Adventures of Janus Stark (with art by Francisco Solano López, in Smash!)
- 1970–1971 Adam Eterno (in Thunder, 1970–1971)
- 1971–1973 Raven on the Wing (in Valiant)
- 1971 Von Hoffman's Invasion (in Jet)
- 1976–1985 The Leopard from Lime Street (with art by Mike Western and Eric Bradbury, in Buster, 27 March 1976 to 18 May 1985)
- 1977–1987 Johnny Red (with art by Joe Colquhoun, in Battle Picture Weekly)
- c. 1978 Operation Shark (Battle Picture Weekly)
- 1979–1980 The Mind of Wolfie Smith:
  - "The Mind of Wolfie Smith" (with art by Vanyo, in Tornado #1–11, 15–22, 1979)
  - "The Evil of Matthew Hobb" (with art by Ian Gibson, in 2000 AD #127–130, 1979)
  - "Night of the Carnivore" (with art by Vanyo (1–12) and Mike White (13–14), in 2000 AD #131–134, 136–145, 1979)
  - "The Mind of Wolfie Smith Book 2" (with Jesus Redondo [1–14] and Mike Dorey as J. Clough [15], in 2000 AD #162–175, 177, 1980)
- 1979 Dan Dare: "Servant of Evil" (with art by Dave Gibbons, in 2000 AD #100–126)
- 1982–1983 Thunderbolt and Smokey (in Eagle)
- 1984–1985 The Robo Machines (with Mario Capaldi and Kim Raymond, in Eagle, 10 November 1984–27 July 1985)
- 1984 The Nightcomers (with art by John Richardson, in Scream!)
- 1987 The Avenger (with art by Mike Western, in Eagle)

=== Sporting strips ===
- 1968–1979 Football Family Robinson (with art by Joe Colquhoun):
  - in Jag (1968–1969)
  - in Tiger (1969–1976)
  - in Roy of the Rovers (1976–1979)
- 1968–1973 The Wild Wonders (with art by Mike Western, in Valiant)
- 1969–1993 Roy of the Rovers (from 1969; continuously 1974–1993)
  - in Tiger (1969–1976)
  - in Roy of the Rovers (1976–1993)
- 1969–1971 Master of the Marsh (with art by Francisco Solano López, in Smash!)
- c. 1970–c. 1980s Nipper
  - in Scorcher (with art by R. Charles Roylance, c. 1970–1976)
  - in Tiger (with art by Roylance, 1976)
  - in Roy of the Rovers (with art by Roylance, 1976–c. 1980s)
- 1976–1977 Death Game 1999 / Spinball (with art by Ian Gibson and Massimo Bellardinelli, in Action)
- 1976–1977 Look Out For Lefty (with art by Barrie Mitchell and Tony Harding, in Action)
- 1976–1977 The Spinball Slaves (in Action)
- 1976 The Team That Went to War (with art by Mike Western and Jim Watson, in Battle Picture Weekly)
- 1977–1983 The Spinball Wars (in Battle Picture Weekly)
- 1977 Harlem Heroes (with art by Dave Gibbons, in 2000 AD progs 2–27)
- 1978 Inferno (a sequel to 'Harlem Heroes') (with art by Massimo Belardinelli, in 2000 AD)
- 1980–1981 Mean Arena (with art by John Richardson, in 2000 AD, progs 178–202)
- 1990–1992 Goalmouth (with art by Francisco Solano López, in Roy of the Rovers)
- 1992–1993 Buster's Ghost (with art by Francisco Solano López, in Roy of the Rovers)
