= Eric Bradbury =

British comic artist (1921–2001)

- Born: Eric Roy Bradbury; 4 January 1921 Sydenham, Kent, England
- Died: 14 May 2001 (aged 80) Southend-on-Sea, Essex, England
- Area: Artist

Cursitor Doom, from Smash, 1969

Eric Bradbury (4 January 1921 – 14 May 2001) was a British comic artist who primarily worked for Amalgamated Press/IPC from the late 1940s to the 1990s.

He studied at Beckenham Art School from 1936, and served in the RAF as a rear gunner on bombers during the Second World War.

After the war he worked for Gaumont-British Animation, alongside future comic creators Mike Western, Ron Smith, Bill Holroyd, Harry Hargreaves and Ron ''Nobby'' Clark. When the studio folded in 1949, Bradbury and Clarke took samples to Amalgamated Press, and were offered work at Knock-Out, edited by Leonard Matthews — Clarke writing, Bradbury drawing. He started out on humour strips like Blossom and Our Ernie, but soon specialised in adventure strips, particularly westerns like Lucky Logan, on which he alternated with former G-B colleague Mike Western, and Buffalo Bill, both in The Comet. For the same title, he drew an adaptation of the 1955 film The King's Thief.

From the 1960s on he developed a dark style similar to Francisco Solano López, and drew strips like Mytek the Mighty, The House of Dolmann, Danny Doom and The Black Crow for Valiant, Phantom Force 5, The Leopard from Lime Street (inking Mike Western's pencils) and Maxwell Hawke for Buster, Von Hoffman's Invasion for Jet, and Cursitor Doom for Smash!. In 1973 he was the artist on an abortive IPC superhero comic, Captain Britain (no relation to the later Marvel UK character). He joined Battle Picture Weekly in 1976 when Valiant was folded into it, taking The Black Crow with it. Other strips he drew for Battle included Joe Two Beans, Coward's Brand on Bradley, Crazy Keller, Death Squad, The Fists of Jimmy Chang and Invasion 1984. He also drew Hook Jaw for Action.

He was described by 2000 AD as one of their "early, unsung heroes," drawing for them from the early issues in 1977 until 1993, including Invasion!, The Mean Arena and Rogue Trooper, as well as numerous Tharg the Mighty stories and Future Shocks. He also drew Doomlord for the revived Eagle in the 1980s.

Bradbury died in May 2001.

== Bibliography ==
Comics work includes:

- Invasion!: Dartmoor (with Gerry Finley-Day, in 2000 AD #10-11, 1977)
- Tharg's Future Shocks (all in 2000 AD):
  - Fish in a Barrel (with Steve Moore, in #208, 1981)
  - Long Live the Queen (with Kelvin Gosnell, in #212, 1981)
  - 'Ang About (with Kelvin Gosnell, in #221, 1981)
  - The Beastly Beliefs of Benjamin Blint (with Alan Moore, in #249, 1982)
  - But is it Art? (with Peter Milligan, in #409, 1985)
  - Eggravation (with Peter Milligan, in #420, 1985)
  - Speak No Evil (with Peter Milligan, in #434, 1985)
  - Robot (with Frances Lynn, in #718, 1991)
  - Pact with the Devil (with Frances Lynn, in #743, 1991)
- Tharg the Mighty (all in 2000 AD), Unless otherwise stated, all stories credited to “T.M.O.” (The Mighty One, AKA Tharg):
  - Tharg's Christmas Tale (in #243-244, 1981)
  - Tharg's Birthday Party (in #260, 1982)
  - The Shedding (with Alan Moore as T.M.O., in 2000 AD #283-285, 1982)
  - The Challenge (in #361, 1984)
  - Zrag Law (in #386, 1984)
  - Supersub! (in #467, 1986)
  - 2000BC (written by Grant Morrison as T.M.O, in #473, 1986)
  - Night of the Living Thrill Sucker (in Sci-Fi Special, 1991)
  - Galactic Greetings (in #719, 1991)
  - The Question (in #749, 1991)
  - Tharg's Masterclass (in #823, 1993)
- Time Twisters:
  - William the Conkerer (with Alan Grant, in 2000 AD #294, 1982)
  - The Big Clock! (with Alan Moore, in 2000 AD #315, 1983)
- Tharg's Terror Tales: Waiting for the Night Train (with Alan Hale, in 2000 AD #838, 1993)
