= The Vigilant (comics) =

Comic book superhero team

- The team on the cover of The Vigilant #1. Clockwise from front: Steel Commando, Yao, Pete Parker, Thunderbolt the Avenger, Death-Man, the Leopard, Doctor Sin, Blake Edmonds.

Group publication information
- Publisher: Rebellion Developments
- First appearance: Scream! & Misty Halloween Special 2017 (October 2017)

In-story information
- Base(s): The Thirteenth Floor, Maxwell Towers
- Member(s): Doctor Sin; Death-Man; Blake Edmonds; Leopard; Pete Parker; Steel Commando; Thunderbolt the Avenger; Yao; Nightcomer

The Vigilant

Series publication information
- Publisher: Rebellion Developments
- Format: Various
- Genre: Superhero
- Publication date: 2017 - 2020

Collected editions
- Trade paperback: ISBN 978-1781088593

The Vigilant are a British superhero team who appear in comics published by Rebellion Developments. The team is mainly made up of updated versions of extant IPC/Fleetway Publications characters that are now owned by Rebellion, mixed with some original characters.

== Creation ==
Having successfully purchased the long-running British comic 2000 AD from Egmont Publishing in 2000, Rebellion expanded their rights to other IPC/Fleetway Publications characters in 2016, buying the library for post-1970 characters and stories from Egmont. Rebellion planned to use the properties in both the Treasury of British Comics series of reprint collections and original material. The original strips had largely inhabited their own separate fictional universes when originally published, even when part of the same anthology titles. However, similar to the 2005 WildStorm series Albion, Rebellion decided to create material featuring characters crossing over in what was dubbed the "Rebellion-verse" during a 2018 announcement.

Written by veteran British comic writer Simon Furman, who revealed his involvement via his Twitter account in April 2018, the series featured both classic characters and some introduced in recent Rebellion material. 2000 AD creator Pat Mills, who had devised the original Doctor Sin, complained that he had received no payment for the character's inclusion and expressed concern about what this said for Rebellion in relation to creator rights. In a post on his personal website, Mills stated "This is just old school foraging other people's talent and, without financial reward, is unacceptable in this day and age".

== Publication history ==
The team debuted in the 2017 Scream & Misty Halloween Special, one of a number of one-shots published by Rebellion reviving classic Fleetway titles. This was followed by a self-titled one-shot in 2018, then another called The Vigilant: Legacy in 2019. However, the series was missing from Rebellion's slate of one-shots in 2020, causing some concern that the story would not receive a conclusion. However, it was later announced the storyline would be finished in Judge Dredd Megazine #421, which would be bundled with a separate giveaway one-shot called The Vigilant Origins, reprinting classic adventures of the team members.

Both one-shots featured a main story starring the team and back-ups focusing on selected members. The villains for the series were also drawn from the IPC/Fleetway library, and several other vintage characters make cameo appearances. Rebellion's 2018 acquisition of the pre-1970 IPC/Fleetway back catalogue saw these expand to include a previous incarnation of the Vigilant featuring characters from this period. As of 2026 no further adventures featuring the team have been published.

== Plot ==
In order to prevent the Blood Rapture bringing the demon Mazoul, mystic hero Doctor Sin leads the Vigilant - Robot Archie, the Steel Claw, Tri-Man, Tim Kelly and Cat Girl - into battle against the Sludge. However the Eye of Zoltec is functioning as a battery for Mazoul the group sacrifice themselves destroying it, leaving Sin the sole survivor.

Twenty years later Sin has also died, with his powers transferring to his grandson, the British hip-hop star Sin Tax. After embracing his new role he recruits a new team of heroes to thwart the Rapture, which the original Vigilant only delayed. He is joined by Thunderbolt the Avenger, the Steel Commando, the Leopard, Pete Parker, Yao and Blake Edmonds, and they recruit Death-Man soon afterwards. A cabal of villains led by Doktor von Hoffman, Doctor Mesmer and the Dwarf plots to use the energies of the cosmic hero Adam Eterno to conquer the world by imprisoning him in a Zenga automaton. Eterno's disappearance from the timestream causes a spate of worldwide incidents, which the team members tackle separately. Observing their battles from his base on the thirteenth floor of Maxwell Towers, Sin has computer Max assemble them along with Death-Man, Pete Parker and the Steel Commando. Sin is able to realise the absence of Eterno is causing the problems, and Death-Man is able to track the captured hero to the Tower of London on an alternate Earth known as Continuum-881. Despite considerable opposition from the villains' forces and the eruption of a Totality Storm, the group are able to return Eterno to his correct place outside space and time. However, despite their success Nightcomer arrives and warns them the real threat still lies ahead.

The Sludge returns and menaces Birmingham before the team defeats it, but the attack is merely a distraction so Von Hoffman's minion Iron Major can steal the Sun Stone, which the villain plans to use to trigger the Blood Rapture. The villains then attack Sin, Death-Man and Steel Commando at a nightclub to cause a distraction for an attempt to steal the Heart of Ra, and Max gathers the rest of the team to save them and thwart the theft, destroying Mesmer's mummy minion Angor in the process. Following this Nightcomer suggests they use the Vigilant name to describe themselves, which quickly replaces Sin's original idea of The Forgotten.

Nightcomer warns she has had a vision that one of the team will turn on them, but is unable to be specific. The traitor sends instructions to Von Hoffman, allowing the Iron Major to recover the Heart of Ra. The Vigilant are able to track Von Hoffman to Raven's Meet, where von Hoffman has lured a large group of VIPs to a masque ball to act as a sacrifice to bring about the Blood Rapture. Sin is able to use a spell to disguise Thunedbolt and Leopard as attendees. Yao meanwhile is absent, and is overpowered by demons, as the rest of the Vigilant are teleported inside the house by Max, only to be ambushed by the Iron Major, Hellman and Eva. Thunderbolt meanwhile that Yao is the final part of the trinity to bring about the Blood Rapture. However Sin is able to weaken Mazoul enough that Yao is able to behead the demon. Mesmer hypnotises von Hoffman and leaves with the Iron Major. Meanwhile, the Vigilant identify Moonie - one of Pete's Liturnians - as the traitor, while Nightcomer takes Hellman and Eva for deprogramming as the team prepares for another return by the Sludge.

== Characters ==
=== The Vigilant ===
After Doctor Sin's death, his grandson took up his title and gathered a team of adventurers, initially as The Forgotten before taking on the name of The Vigilant. The team have a base on the 13th floor of Maxwell Towers, where sentient computer Max acts as the team's support network.

- Doctor Sin: Formerly Britain's top hip-hop artist Sin Tax before discovering his late grandfather was the original Doctor Sin. Sin is a powerful mystic capable of casting complex occult spells, and is founder and leader of the Vigilant, despite his sardonic and occasionally irritating nature.

The original Doctor Sin was created by writer Pat Mills and artist Horacio Lalia for the 1979 2000AD Annual. A revamped version had later appeared in the 2000AD Action Special in 1992, written by John Smith and with art from John M. Burns. The Sin Tax version of the character was devised by Rob Williams and Luca Pizzari, first appearing in the 2015 Free Comic Book Day edition of 2000AD.

- Death-Man: Death's right-hand man who returns to life any time he is killed. He is charged with hunting down beings who try to escape the grim reaper, which he does in hope of eventually earning his own freedom from life. Due to his role, several unusual beings with extended lifespans are wary of him; Cursitor Doom tells Sin that Death-Man is responsible for his grandfather's death.

The character was created by Keith Richardson and Henry Flint, first appearing in the 2016 Free Comic Book Day edition of 2000AD.

- Blake Edmonds: Once a handsome and successful Formula 1 driver, Edmonds was severely disfigured in an aeroplane crash. To hide his features from the public he donned a mask, and considered suicide before deciding it was a cowardly response. Instead, he decided to carry out dangerous stunts as he felt he had nothing to lose; this developed into a career as a fearless adventurer.

Edmonds was created by Barrie Tomlinson and Vanyo and starred in the strip Death Wish, which debuted in Speed in 1980 before continuing in Tiger and then Eagle.

- The Leopard: After being scratched by a radioactive leopard, teenager Billy Farmer develops the proportional strength, agility and senses of a leopard. He undertakes a crime-fighting career which he has maintained as an adult, focusing on street-level heroics. Shortly after joining the group he drops his original costume for a more modern design. Since the death of his kindly Aunt Joan, Farmer also has to care for his once abusive Uncle Charlie, who has dementia. The Leopard was created by Tom Tully and Mike Western, and debuted in "The Leopard from Lime Street" strip in Buster in 1976.
- Pete Parker: Otherwise a normal human, Parker is accompanied by six small aliens - Kon-Dar, Dokk, Moonie, Grunf, Tigg and Zapp - from the planet Liturnus, who stay with him at all times and use their advanced technology to help him. Parker is wracked with doubt over his place on the team.

The character was created by Tom Tully and Francisco Solano López in 1973 for the Buster strip "Pete's Pocket Army" in 1973.

- Steel Commando: A powerful robotic soldier developed by genius Professor Brayne for the British military in World War II, a programming error meant the mechanical behemoth would only respond to the voice of Private Ernest "Excused Boots" Bates, widely believed to be the laziest man in the British Army. Following yeoman service in the war, the Steel Commando attempted to adapt to civilian life, but after attacking children playing war in the street was instead placed on display at the Imperial War Museum until 2017. At the urging of Doctor Sin, Pete Parker's Liturian allies were able to restore the Commando, who believed Sin was Ernie and began following his orders.

The Steel Commando and Bates were created by Frank S. Pepper and Alex Henderson, initially for Thunder in 1970 before moving over to Lion.

- Thunderbolt the Avenger: Police constable Mick Wiley was given a wristwatch by a dying scientist, powered by Thermo-Clyodine-Phostium, granting the wearer the ability to transform into a powerful superhero for two hours at a time. Wiley embarked on a double-life as the crimefighter Thunderbolt the Avenger until he was killed in combat. He subsequently bequeathed the watch to colleague WPC Mary Landson, who continues as Thunderbolt. She is capable of flight and has greatly increased strength.

The original Thunderbolt the Avenger debuted in Buster in 1965; the character's creators are currently unknown. The new female version first appeared in the 2017 Scream & Misty Halloween Special, written by Keith Richardson and drawn by Henry Flint; initially her full identity was unclear before being revealed in the 2018 The Vigilant one-shot.

- Yao: After her parents are killed by demons, Yao begins hunting the creatures, using a huge arsenal of weapons drawn from a dimension known as the Other Place.

Yao was created by Keith Richardson, Henry Flint, Simon Furman and Simon Coleby. The character first appeared in the 2017 Scream & Misty Halloween Special.

- Nightcomer: The daughter of ghost hunters David and Anne Rogan, Beth Rogan was a teenager when they were killed investigating the haunted house Raven's Meet. She has ESP and psychometric powers, and is searching for her missing brother Rick and her twin children. Her search brings her to the Vigilant when she discovers Von Hoffman has brainwashed her children and is using them as his minions Hellman and Eva.

The character first appeared in "The Nightcomers" in the pages of Scream! in 1984, and was created by Tom Tully and John Richardson.

=== Other heroes ===
- Adam Eterno: A cosmic universal force which takes on the aspect of a superhuman hero, Adam Eterno exists simultaneously across multiple dimensions.

The character first appeared in Thunder in 1970, and was created by Jack Le Grand, Tom Tully and Tom Kerr.

- Erasmus Hemlock: An alchemist whose work is the source of Adam Eterno's powers.

=== Villains ===
- Von Hoffman: A former Nazi scientist who undertakes numerous attacks on Britain in revenge for his long imprisonment as a war criminal.

Created by Tom Tully and Eric Bradbury, the character was created as the antagonist in "Von Hoffman's Invasion", which debuted in Jet in 1971.

- Dr. Mesmer: A relentless and callous master hypnotist who controls the 3000-year old mummy Angor, and an ally of Von Hoffman. He is enraged when Angor is destroyed battling the Vigilant, and eventually abandons Von Hoffman after the rapture fails.

Created by Donne Avenell and Carlos Cruz, the character debuted in the 1971 Lion strip "Dr. Mesmer's Revenge."

- The Dwarf: A diminutive London criminal with a genius for robotics, and the current operator of the Iron Major, a powerful suit of mechanical armour.

The Dwarf first appeared in a self-titled strip in Jet in 1971. The original Iron Major (who appears in a scene set in 1943) debuted in "Sergeants Four", also in Jet in 1971.

- Goat: A shapeshifting alien from the planet Ven. On arrival in Ireland, the creature befriended schoolboy Paddy McGinty. When not required to be something different, he generally defaults to a goat and is nicknamed such by Paddy. The pair had many adventures together until Paddy was captured by Von Hoffman. He used the boy as a bargaining chip to get the alien to do his bidding. Goat turns on Von Hoffman when Sin reveals the villain had Paddy killed some time before.

The character first appeared in Jet in the strip "Paddy McGinty's Goat".

== Collected editions ==
In 2021, Rebellion issued a trade paperback collection compiling the material featuring the team, as well as selected strips starring the characters.

Title	ISBN	Release date	Contents
The Vigilant	9781781088593	15 April 2021	The Vigilant #1, The Vigilant: Legacy #1 and material from 2000 AD Free Comic Day Special 2015–2016, Scream & Misty Halloween Special 2017 and Judge Dredd Magazine #421.

== Reception ==
The Vigilant received largely positive reviews. Stacey Baugher of Major Spoilers praised the initial one-shot's fast pace, surmising it "introduces a new class of superhero to the stands, and it's British enough to make you want to take a look". John Freeman enjoyed the opening instalment, though he felt it was perhaps too crammed with characters - reflecting "having been handed a massive toy chest of characters, strips and concepts, the creative team involved on The Vigilant were a bit overwhelmed by the choice offered to play with, and, at times, used too many of them within this opening story". He also enjoyed The Vigilant: Legacy, but felt the slow publication pace was frustrating.

Andy Oliver of Broken Frontier praised the collected edition of the story, feeling reading the storyline in one volume allowed it to be more coherent, noting that "It's an incredibly difficult line to walk in appealing to the nostalgists wanting those nods to the past and the new audience discovering these characters for the first time, but Furman largely navigates it with a careful balance of due reverence and accessibility".
