= Steel Commando =

British comic book character

The Steel Commando
- The Steel Commando on the cover of the 4 August 1973 edition of Lion. Art by Alex Henderson.

Character information
- First appearance: Thunder (17 October 1970)

In-story information
- Full name: Mark 1 Indestructible Robot
- Species: Robot
- Place of origin: Earth
- Team affiliations: British Army
- Partnerships: Lance-Corporal Ernest Bates
- Notable aliases: Ironsides

Publication information
- Publisher: IPC Magazines
- Schedule: Weekly
- Title(s): Thunder; 17 October 1970 to 13 March 1971; Lion; 20 March 1971 to 18 May 1974; Thunder Annual; 1972 to 1973; Lion Special; 1971 to 1976 and 1978; Valiant; 25 May to 22 June 1974; Lion Annual; 1975 to 1978
- Formats: Original material for the series has been published as a strip in the comics anthology(s) Thunder; Lion; Valiant.
- Genre: Action/adventure
- Publication date: 17 October 1970 – 18 May 1974

Creative team
- Writer(s): Frank S. Pepper
- Artist(s): Alex Henderson; Vince Wernham

Reprints
- Collected editions
- Steel Commando - Full Metal Warfare: ISBN 9781781086810

The Steel Commando is a British comic character, appearing in strips published by IPC Magazines. Created by Frank S. Pepper, the character first appeared in the first issue of the short-lived boys' weekly adventure anthology comic Thunder, dated 17 October 1970. After Thunder ended in March 1971 the strip continued in Lion until 1974. The character is a robotic soldier fighting for the British Army in World War II; due to a programming error the mechanical man will only obey the orders of layabout Private Ernest 'Excused Boots' Bates.

== Creation ==
Thunder was one of several new titles devised by IPC Magazines between 1969 and 1971. An all-new line-up of strips was devised for the new comic, including Adam Eterno and Black Max. "The Steel Commando" was created by the experienced Frank S. Pepper, who had a long history with IPC and its predecessors Amalgamated Press and Fleetway Publications, beginning with "Rockfist Rogan" for The Champion in 1937 before creating Captain Condor for Lion in 1952 and Roy Race for Tiger in 1954. For "The Steel Commando" he worked with staff artist Alex Henderson, who had worked on strips such as "Spot the Clue with Zip Nolan" for Lion. The strip was given four pages of Thunder, two of which were in partial colour, with either red or magenta ink added to the black and white.

== Publishing history ==
Thunder only lasted 22 issues before being cancelled and merged with Lion. The amalgamation is often considered one of the more prominent examples of IPC's 'Hatch, Match and Dispatch' policy of starting a new title, seeing which features were popular with readers and then combining it with an established title, which would receive a substantial boost in sales as a result. British comics historian Steve Holland would even go as far as to suggest that Thunder was deliberately created to be merged into Lion. "The Steel Commando" was one of no less than seven Thunder features to carry over to Lion and Thunder from the 20 March 1971 edition, and would remain a feature of the comic until it was cancelled and folded into Valiant in 1974. "The Steel Commando" was not among the strips that continued, though the character made a six-week guest appearance in "Captain Hurricane" in the rebranded Valiant and Lion.

Along with the rest of IPC's post-1 January 1970 material, "The Steel Commando" was among the IPC Youth Group properties consolidated into the resurrected Fleetway Publications and sold to Persimmon BPCC Publishing on 6 July 1987, and were later purchased by Egmont Publishing. As such the Steel Commando was not among those licensed by WildStorm for the 2005 limited series Albion, though the character made a brief unnamed cameo in the second issue.

In 2016 the characters owned by Egmont were sold to Rebellion Developments, who began publishing both reprints and new material featuring the classic characters. After a brief cameo in the 2017 Scream! and Misty Halloween Special, the Steel Commando was announced as a member of The Vigilant, a new team of extant and fresh characters. The team first fully appeared in the 2018 one-shot The Vigilant, which included a short back-up strip (written by Aaron Stack, with art from Warwick Fraser-Combe and Staz Johnson) that explained the Steel Commando's post-war mothballing and subsequent reactivation by Doctor Sin. In 2019 Rebellion issued a digest-sized 160-page trade paperback Steel Commando - Full Metal Warfare (Note: Referred to in some sources as The Best of Steel Commando.), compiling the Thunder strips and a selection of those from Lion as well as the Valiant guest appearances, under their Treasury of British Comics label.

== Plot summary ==
Early in World War II, British scientists create the Mark 1 Indestructible Robot to battle the Germans. However, a programming error makes the robot impossible to control until it stumbles across Cockney malingerer Lance-Corporal Ernest 'Excused-Boots' Bates and begins responding to his orders and his orders alone. Bates' ambitions generally extend to finding menial work some distance behind the front lines, keeping his head down until the war is over and trying to get out of wearing regulation footwear. Much to his chagrin, his command over the robot sees him placed in charge of the Steel Commando for missions in occupied France. The robot, which Bates swiftly nicknames 'Ironsides', proves to be a near-unstoppable weapon - when Ernie can be persuaded to order it into combat. Thankfully for high command, his demands for doing so are generally small-time, usually just involving a promise of comfortable shoes.

== Collected editions ==
Title	ISBN	Publisher	Release date	Contents
Steel Commando - Full Metal Warfare	9781781086810	Rebellion Developments	22 August 2019	Material from Thunder 17 October 1970 to 27 February 1971; Lion 20 March 1970 to 16 December 1972, Valiant 25 May to 22 June 1974 and Thunder Annual 1972 to 1974.

== Reception ==
Both the character and the strip have received mixed reviews. In 1992, Lew Stringer criticised the Steel Commando as a derivative combination of Captain Hurricane and Robot Archie, feeling it was "too light-hearted to sustain interest".

Previewing the collected edition for Comicon.com, Richard Bruton noted the outdated attitudes on display, something acknowledged by Rebellion in a disclaimer included in the book. Win Wiacek's review for Now Read This! noted the "frequently appallingly racist" tone of the times of the original publication, but felt there was a "working-class whimsical irony" to Bates, who he compared to Andy Capp. He reiterated this view in a review for Slings & Arrows, feeling it "provides a wondrous window onto simpler times that still offer fascinating fun for the cautiously prepared reader". Starburst gave the collection a tentatively positive review, noting it as "a fun artefact" while noting the strips' repetitive nature, and the "jarring" shift of tone for the Valiant strips.
