= Captain Condor =

British comic book story

- Captain Condor (right) on the cover of the 1957 Lion Annual.

Character information
- First appearance: Lion (23 February 1952)
- Created by: Frank S. Pepper

In-story information
- Species: Human
- Place of origin: Earth
- Team affiliations: The Space Patrol
- Partnerships: Pete; Quartermaster Burke; Jason; Mike

Publication information
- Publisher: Amalgamated Press; Fleetway Publications
- Schedule: Weekly
- Title(s): Lion; 23 February 1952 to 26 February 1966; Lion Annual; 1954 to 1966 and 1968; Lion Summer Special 1971 and 1980
- Formats: Original material for the series has been published as a strip in the comics anthology(s) Lion.
- Genre: Science fiction
- Publication date: 23 February 1952 – 26 February 1966

Creative team
- Writer(s): Frank S. Pepper
- Artist(s): Ron Forbes; Neville Wilson; Geoff Campion; Reg Bunn; Keith Watson; Brian Lewis

Captain Condor is a British comic character who has appeared in eponymous strips published by Amalgamated Press and Fleetway Publications. The character, a space pilot, first appeared in the launch issue of weekly comic Lion on 23 February 1952 and was created by Frank S. Pepper.

== Creation ==
As part of Amalgamated Press' attempt to respond to the runaway success of Eagle by creating Lion, management identified the need for a space hero to compete with the hugely popular Dan Dare. Despite disliking science fiction, managing editor Reg Eves commissioned writer Frank S. Pepper to devise such a character; Pepper created Captain Condor to headline the new comic. As a sign of gratitude from the publisher, Pepper was allowed to retain publishing rights to captain, who would appear on the front cover of Lion – the only page of the comic to be printed in colour, with a second black-and-white page of "Captain Condor" being printed on the rear cover. Neither Lion nor its cover-star would match the popularity of Eagle and Dare, but were a commercial success regardless. Pepper, writer of the long-running World War II boxing pilot Rockfist Rogan for The Champion, also had little experience or interest in science fiction. As such he fell on the familiar adventure story trope of a wrongly accused hero and simply relocated it to outer space. Pepper mapped out an initial story arc while Lion editor Bernard Smith searched for an artist; with the launch looming he recruited Ron Forbes.

== Publishing history ==
Condor started out – in Pepper's words – as "a non-character" but gradually developed a following of his own, though never matching Dare's fame and popularity. As Lion had planned to undercut Eagle through cheap production values, Forbes was unable to follow the example of Frank Hampson and use detailed models and photographs in his work, which was printed on cheap newsprint paper in four colours rather than the high-quality photogravure used for Eagle. Nevertheless, Captain Condor was popular enough for Timex to license the character for a children's wristwatch in 1956, something that earned Pepper a modest amount. Other merchandise included a set of handkerchiefs.

The initial cycle of stories ran through to March 1955, featuring Captain Condor as an unjustly imprisoned hero leading a resistance against the Dictator of the Planets, later aided by sidekick Pete. Following the latter's defeat, the serial was reconfigured to a format closer to Dan Dare, with Captain Condor as a dashing commander in the heroic Space Patrol, with Pete replaced by Quartermaster Burke. A further shake-up came on 27 July 1957, when (midway through serial "Captain Condor and the SOS from the Stars") the feature was transferred to the black-and-white interiors, with World War II pilot Paddy Payne taking over the front cover. Forbes also left the strip, being replaced by Neville Wilson. The new artist redesigned the character, while Space Cadets Mike and Jason joined the strip in place of Burke.

Amalgamated Press' decision to cancel Comet and Sun Weekly in October 1959 and merge them with Tiger (where Comet's own space hero Jet-Ace Logan would continue) and Lion respectively led to a reorganisation of the strips and their creative teams, with Geoff Campion and Reg Bunn alternating for the rest of the year. Meanwhile, Hulton Press had sold Eagle to another rival publisher, Odhams Press. They acrimoniously replaced Hampson's art studio with that of Frank Bellamy, leaving many of the "Dan Dare" art team out of work. As such both Keith Watson (1960 to 1961) and Brian Lewis (1961 to 1963) would be hired to work on "Captain Condor". Pepper would later identify the Watson-drawn "Captain Condor and the War in Space" as his favourite work on the character, modelling much of the story on the events of World War II; he would later recall "We had Quisling invasion techniques, plus the fall of Singapore and Pearl Harbor, plus a resistance movement and the culmination in a sort of D-Day".

However, after Lewis' tenure the strip struggled to find a suitable artist – Spaniard Alfredo Sanchis Cortes was among those tried – and ended abruptly after 4 April 1964. The following month "Captain Condor" returned as a series of self-contained text stories, still written by Pepper (who was by now also writing "Jet-Ace Logan" in Tiger) for a ten-week run, with a one-off return on 14 November 1964. Another small-scale comeback came in 1965, when the Watson-drawn serials "The Hole in Outer Space" and "Captain Condor and the Forbidden Planet" were reprinted across five months, with a second shorter reprint run consisting of Lewis' "Captain Condor and the Push-Button Planet" running from 1968 to 1969. Alongside the first reprint run, the Campion-drawn "Captain Condor and the Planet of Destruction" was modified and reprinted as the adventures of a 'new' character called Rip Solar in Ranger Meanwhile, heavily edited versions two serials were issued in #6 and #8 of Lion Picture Library. The Lewis reprints ended on 26 April 1969, marking the last appearance of Captain Condor in the pages of the weekly Lion.

The following edition saw the ailing Eagle – brought under the same roof when Fleetway Publications (as Amalgamated Press had become in 1960) and Odhams had been merged into IPC Magazines – folded into Lion, and reprints of Captain Condor were replaced by reprints of Dan Dare. Following this, the character largely remained out of print, though in 1979 a heavily edited version of "Captain Condor and the Forbidden Planet" was printed in Starlord's first annual, and in 1980 a new text story – written by Pepper – published in the Lion Holiday Special; the latter is the last known new material featuring the character. The character did however make a surprise reappearance on a decal used for a diecast model of the 'Lion Captain Condor Panel Bus', released by Corgi Toys.

Along with the rest of the Amalgamated Press/Fleetway/IPC characters created before 1 January 1970, the rights to Captain Condor were retained by IPC until being sold to Rebellion Developments in 2018. County Mayo publisher Hibernia Books, who had licensed various Fleetway/IPC properties before and after the deal with Rebellion, announced a collected edition in their Fleetway Files series featuring Captain Condor in 2022. The book compiled Brian Lewis' work on the character into a single volume for the first time.

== Plot summary ==
In the year 3000, Inter-Planet Space-Lines pilot Captain Condor is banished to the uranium mines of Titan, outlawed by the Dictator of the Planets after refusing to transport slaves from Venus. With the aid of fellow prisoner Pete he is able to escape and begin raising a rebel force against the Dictator. The growing rebel army was able to escape the Dictator's huge military and establish a base on Zor, an uncharted moon. Under Condor's command, the rebels prepared to strike back against the Dictator while avoiding discovery by enemy spies.

== Collected edition ==
Title	ISBN	Publisher	Release date	Contents
Captain Condor	9781781086551	Hibernia Books	April 2022	Material from Lion 30 December 1961 to 12 January 1963

== Reception ==
Generally reception to both the character and adventures of Captain Condor has been mixed, typically viewing it as a derivative version of Dan Dare. Writing for Australian fanzine The Mentor in 1992, Andrew Darlington considered much of the early work on the character uninspired but suggested the character may have made a more lasting impression had either of Watson or Lewis remained on the series longer than they did. The same year Lew Stringer wrote a brief history of Fleetway's classic boys' titles for inclusion in the 2000 AD Action Special, criticising Captain Condor's clear lifting of Dan Dare's format, and feeling "Condor's universe was purely rooted in the Flash Gordon serials of the 1930s, and must have looked antiquated even to the readers of the 1950s". Graham Kibble-White was similarly unmoved by the early adventures of Captain Condor, but echoed Darlington by stating the arrival of Keith Watson gave the character "a new lease of life".

Reviewing the Hibernia collection for Slings & Arrows, Frank Plowright felt the stories had "period charm" and praised Lewis' art, while being pleasantly surprised by the quality of Pepper's plotting.
