= List of Lion stories =

The British weekly boys' comic Lion was published between 1952 and 1974 by the Amalgamated Press, Fleetway Publications and IPC.

== The 10,000 Disasters of Dort ==
Published: May 18, 1968, to November 23, 1968
Writer: Mike Butterworth
Artists: Luis Bermejo, José Ortiz

When Ratta, dictator of Dort, finds his planet has fifty years before being destroyed by its sun he identifies the Earth of 2000 as the only suitable home for his people. To force Earth into agreeing, he announces he will be unleashing ten thousand disasters on Earth. Sure enough, New York is destroyed when Ratta's technology renders all of the metal in the city unstable; Paris is made uninhabitable due to an aggressive alien weed; Melbourne is overran by enlarged animals; tea is used to most of the population of London are transformed into violent maniacs; incredible weaponry is given to the savage Jamali tribesmen of central Arabia; all electricity on Earth is temporarily removed; a brief ice age freezes the English Channel; Germany is overran by a plague of ants; thousands are blinded by an artificial sun; and 90% of the remaining population reduced to a bestial state by tainted wheat. Opposing Ratta is Britain's top scientist Mike Dauntless, aided by French orphan Gaston.

- The story was reprinted in Lion from December 22, 1973, to May 18, 1974; this second run featured a modified conclusion so the story finished before the merger with Valiant. In 2023, Rebellion Developments produced a trade paperback containing the entire serial as part of their Treasury of British Comics series of collected editions.

== Adam Eterno ==
Published: March 20, 1971, to May 18, 1974

After quaffing the Elixir of Life, Adam Eterno is doomed to immortality and drifts through time trying to find a solid gold weapon that can kill him.

- Inherited from Thunder and continued in Valiant until the latter was merged with Battle

== The Amazing Adventures of Mister X ==
Published: March 7, 1953, to October 17, 1959
Writers: Edward R. Home-Gall

A globetrotting hero helps out the helpless with jujitsu and expert shooting skills, keeping his identity a secret to ward off reprisals.

- Originally an illustrated text story, before a switch to comic strip format from August 23, 1958. The character is no relation to the earlier strip "The Amazing Mr. X" from DC Thomson's The Dandy.

== The Amazing Jack Wonder ==
Published: February 5, 1966, to May 28, 1966
Artist: Bill Lacey

Sailor Captain Jack Wonder gets caught up in a civil war in tropical banana republic Losana. Used as a guinea pig by evil scientist Varan, he is accidentally given the ability to change into any object. Breaking free, he and his chirpy first mate 'Lofty' Locke overthrow the country's dictator Quantro. Later, the pair signed up to the RAF and fought the Nazis.

== Andy's Army ==
Published: September 28, 1968, to April 26, 1969

Wanting to emulate his father, a Colonel in the British Army, 14-year old Andy springs a trio of prisoners from the brig and heads behind German lines to fight a guerrilla war.

== Big Hank – The Soft-Hearted Heavyweight ==
Published: February 23, 1952, to June 28, 1952
Writer: Duncan Matheson

Honduran circus strongman Hank tries to launch a career as a heavyweight boxer with the aid of friend and acrobat Tich Wilson. While Hank has the strength for the sport he is held back by his reluctance to actually hit anyone without provocation.

== Billy the Kid ==
Published: November 7, 1959, to April 23, 1960
Artist: Fred Holmes

Lone avenger William Bonney and his steed Satan hunt down wrong-doers in the Old West.

- The only strip continued from Sun after the merger. The story was later edited and reprinted as "The Black Avenger" in Hurricane.

== Black Max ==
Published: 20 March 1971 to 21 October 1972
Writer: Frank S. Pepper
Artist: Alfonso Font

Baron Maximilien Von Klorr is Germany's most fearsome ace pilot of World War I – partly due to being helped by a gigantic bats. With his Fokker Dr.I painted black, he soon earns the nickname Black Max. His opposition comes from the Royal Flying Corps, particularly plucky Lieutenant Tim Wilson.

- Inherited from Thunder. The supporting character of Doktor Gratz would later spin off into "Secrets of the Demon Dwarf".

== Boy Kidd ==
Published: June 11, 1966, to July 16, 1966
Writer: René Goscinny
Artist: Morris

A town at the mercy of juvenile outlaw Boy Kidd is offered salvation by louche travelling gunslinger Buck Bingo.

- Modified reprints of "Lucky Luke" from Spirou; continued from the short-lived The Champion revival.

== Brett Marlowe ==
Published: February 23, 1952, to July 24, 1954
Writer: John Fordice

A private investigator, Brett Marlowe is an expert in detective work and frequently unravelled cases with only the smallest of clues, before bringing miscreants down in a two-fisted fashion. Marlowe was assisted by his faithful chauffeur Rusty Race.

- Only made sporadic appearances. For the majority of the strip, "cases" lasted a single two-page episode, though later some serial stories were created.

== Britain AD2170 ==
Published: July 25, 1970, to March 13, 1971
Artist: Solano López

After a five-year mission in space, the probe ship Explorer – crewed by astronauts Captain Vic Lacey, Doc Keelson and 'Technical Twins' Harvey and Tragg – crash on landing. Due to Earth Time and Space Time running at different speeds, they discover 200 years have passed, and the Britain of 2170 has regressed to a primitive state. The group uses the remnants of technology that still work to survive warring groups of savages – particularly the barbaric Snakemen – and strange monsters as they try to rebuild civilisation.

== Bruce Kent Invites You To Spot The Clue ==
Published: June 22, 1957, to May 2, 1964

Detective Bruce Kent and feckless sidekick Jim solve crimes, encouraging readers to use the same clues available to them to guess the result of the case first.

- From 1962 the strip's title was modified to the more competitive "Bruce Kent Challenges You to Spot the Clue". The interactive "spot the clue" format was later adapted for Zip Nolan.

== The Can-Do Kids ==
Published: October 16, 1971, to April 22, 1972
Writers: Pat Mills, John Wagner
Artist: Carlos Cruz, Tom Kerr

Upon leaving school four friends set their hearts on travelling around the world and begin a number of unconventional fundraising activities – much to the ire of a retired Brigadier turned local busybody.

== Captain Condor ==
Published: February 23, 1952, to February 26, 1966
Writer: Frank S. Pepper
Artist: Keith Watson, Geoff Campion, Brian Lewis

Ace pilot of the year 3000, Condor spearheaded the Space Patrol's victory over the megalomaniac Dictator after being banished to Titan. He was aided by the moon's natives, the unintelligent but amiable Geeks. This achieved, Condor led further Space Patrol missions with his customary derring-do.

- Captain Condor was created by Frank S. Pepper as a competitor to Eagle's Dan Dare. The strip was on the front and back covers (initially the only pages featuring colour) until being ousted by "Paddy Payne" in 1957. New adventures continued until 1964, when Captain Condor switched to reprinting old adventures until ending entirely in 1966.

== Carson's Cubs ==
Published: September 10, 1966, to July 21, 1973
Artists: Geoff Campion, Fred Holmes

Retiring after a glittering playing career, football legend Joe Carson takes up the management reigns of old club Newton Town, who are languished in the third division with no funds thanks to penny-pinching, asset-stripping director Arthur Braggart. Despite this Carson strives to improve the club, building a competitive side around young players like teen hotshots Andy Streak, Rocky Stone and Tiddler Smith.

- Shortly after the merger with Eagle the strip guest-starred the Circus Wanderers as opposition.

== Code Name – Barracuda ==
Published: September 10, 1966, to February 24, 1968
Artist: Antonio Sciotti

Superhumanly strong United Nations special agent Barracuda and his similarly enhanced partner Rollo use an array of high-tech gadgetry to keep the world safe from American supervillain King Cobra and his criminal organisation W.A.M. (War Against Mankind).

- Barracuda and Rollo also appeared in Fleetway's Secret Agent Super Library digest series, alternating with Johnny Nero

== Dan Dare ==
Published: May 3, 1969, to October 24, 1970

The pilot from the future fends off the threat of Treen leader the Mekon.

- Inherited from Eagle. Budget cuts had already seen the strip switch to reprints in 1967, and these continued in Lion. The repeats aborted the end of the "Rogue Planet" storyline which had been running in the last Eagle to start the stint in Lion from the beginning of "Reign of the Robots". In contrast to its original colour format, the art was rendered in greyscale. After a reprint of "The Phantom Fleet" with a compressed conclusion, "Dan Dare" disappeared from Lion after October 24, 1970.

== Danger Man ==
Published: June 11, 1966, to September 3, 1966
Artist: Jesús Blasco

Special agent John Drake carries out numerous hazardous missions against corrupt governments and criminal organisations.

- Uniquely among Lion's oeuvre, "Danger Man" was a licensed strip based on the ATV television series of the same name, with the art using the likeness of star Patrick McGoohan. Years later it was crudely modified as "Matt Mason – Secret Agent" for Bumper Story Book for Boys.

== The Day the World Drowned ==
Published: November 30, 1968, to April 26, 1969
Artist: Ted Kearon

A colossal underwater earthquake radically alters Earth's geography. Having survived the quake in a reinforced diving vessel, research scientists Bill Sterling and Don Worth find themselves in the middle of an arid wasteland, while their brothers Jamie and Bobby have to deal with a suddenly flooded London. Reunited, the quartet search the radically changed planet for other survivors while avoiding the insane Ark-building Drage family.

== Dr. Mesmer's Revenge ==
Published: October 16, 1971, to October 21, 1972
Writer: Donne Avenell
Artist: Carlos Cruz

When thieves raid the collection of hypnotist Dr. Mesmer, he uses magical cat statue Bulbul to control 5,000-year-old mummy to punish them. His brutal methods soon see him become a feared villain.

- The strip was originally announced to be part of Thunder's line-up but debuted in Lion after the titles were merged. Both Dr. Mesmer and Angor would reappear as villains in Rebellion Developments' The Vigilant.

== Drive For Your life ==
Published: December 6, 1969, to January 31, 1970
Artist: Barrie Mitchell

Balkan aristocrat and racing driver Count von Dracca is exposed as a coward and drummed out of motorsport. He spends the next five years devising a series of brutal traps and kidnaps his six old rivals – German Urich Krutz, British Roland Howard-Price, Italian Alberto Guilo and Americans 'Porkchop' Porter, 'Big Mike' Murphy and Rev Ryder – and forces them to take part in a series of racing challenges as revenge, with only one to survive.

== Flame o' the Forest ==
Published: February 7, 1970, to November 7, 1970
Artist: Massimo Belardinelli

When his mummers' troupe is massacred by cruel Norman warlord the Raven in 1066, Saxon orphan Hal is taught a variety of skills by his mortally wounded uncle Sarl, enabling him to become the Flame o' the Forest, taking vengeance on the Raven and his knights.

== Fleetfoot Fights the Redskin Rebels ==
Published: January 7, 1956, to September 8, 1956
Writer: R.G. Thomas

Chief Fleetfoot of the Cawlees plans to make a peace treaty with settlers but a brave named Blank Panther vehemently disagrees and starts a civil war within the tribe.

== The Flying Fortress ==
Published: March 31, 1973, to June 30, 1973
Artist: Giorgio Trevisan

Two boys holidaying in Europe shelter from the rain in a sinister castle, only to find it is the mobile base of villain Doctor Skurge.

== Flying Furies ==
Published: April 2, 1966, to September 10, 1966
Writer: Jean-Michel Charlier
Artist: Albert Uderzo

Two jet pilots with contrasting personalities move through a training school.

- Modified reprints of "Tanguy et Laverdure" from Pilote.

== Flying Saucer Over Africa ==
Published: September 3, 1955, to April 21, 1956
Writer: Cliff Hooper
Artist: W. R. Culver

When Professor Synton finds the ruins of a forgotten advanced civilisation in the jungles of Africa, his assistant Buloff imprisons him and uses the technology to build saucer ships, ray guns and robots. Fortunately for the natives, white cameraman Danny Malloy and his friend Ted is present to film white rhinoceros, and teams up with Mr. Zaka to combat Buloff's plans for world domination.

== Frogmen Are Tough! ==
Published: August 30, 1952, to June 20, 1953
Writer: Edward R. Home-Gall

Troopers Don Drew and Nobby Pounds are tasked with tracking down a secret Italian naval base wreaking havoc on Allied Mediterranean convoys during World War II.

== The Fugitive from the Planet Scror ==
Published: February 7, 1970, to July 18, 1970
Artist: Solano Lopez

After changing his mind over a Scror plan to invade Earth, shape-shifting alien Karg takes refuge on the planet, pursued by relentless enemy Groll.

== Gadgetman and Gimmick-Kid ==
Published: 4 May to 26 October 1968
Writer: Jerry Siegel
Artist: Vicente Alcázar

A costumed crimefighting duo who used an arsenal of technological devices to battle the likes of the Trickster and the Taunting Titan.

== Gargan ==
Published: May 3, 1969, to January 31, 1970
Artist: Solano Lopez

Cryptid Gargan and superannuated sage Reega the Wise are kidnapped from the Himalayas by cruel American exhibitor Cash Maddack. Their friend, a boy called Rhurki, resolves to free them.

== General Johnny ==
Published: February 7, 1970, to March 13, 1971
Creative Team: Ted Kearon

After his exceptional skill at wargaming is applied to real-life World War II battles, schoolboy Johnny Quick is given the rank of General and given tactical control of a chunk of the British Army.

== The Gladiators ==
Published: May 3, 1969, to January 31, 1970
Artist: Ted Kearon

Six renegade gladiators on the run from Julius Caesar are transported forward in time by a sorcerer, and fit themselves in the midst of World War II.

- Inherited from Eagle.

== Highway Danger! ==
Published: February 27, 1965, to January 1, 1966
Artist: Bert Vandeput

Small-time racer Don Dentry wrecks his garage-built car saving the life of champion driver Milton Halder, who rewards Dentry by letting him take his place with the top team while he recuperates. However, Dentry and his loyal mechanic's big break is complicated by ongoing sabotage shenanigans within the team.

== Hunters of the Tower of London Traitors ==
Published: March 14, 1953, to October 17, 1953
Writer: Ted Cowan
Artist: Alan Philpott

Elizabethan blacksmith Dirk Selden and apprentice Hal Rudd work to counter the treasonous monarch-toppling scheme of Simon De'ath.

== It's Charlie of the Chimps ==
Published: May 15, 1965, to September 18, 1965
Artist: Joe Colquhoun

As the king of the jungle has headed off for a Hollywood career, stranded airman Charlie finds himself filling the gap.

== Jet Jordan ==
Published: June 11, 1966, to September 3, 1966
Writer: Jean-Michel Charlier
Artist: Albert Weinberg

Canadian Air Force pilot Jet Jordan undertakes dangerous test missions.

- Modified reprints of "Dan Cooper" from Tintin; continued from The Champion revival.

== The Jigsaw Journey ==
Published: March 20, 1971, to July 17, 1971
Writer: Frank S. Pepper
Artist: Massimo Belardinelli

Explorer Wolfgang Stranger and his young friend Tom Taylor discover they have one-ninth of a treasure map, and set out to find the other eight.

- The story was a sequel to Thunder strip "The Terrible Trail to Tolmec" and was originally planned for that title before it was merged into Lion.

== Jimmi from Jupiter ==
Published: February 13, 1965, to September 4, 1965
Artist: Mario Capaldi

A young boy from Jupiter gets stranded on Earth, and is taken under the wing the George Gilbert and his kindly family until he can return home. Jimmi's Gamma powers often activate at inopportune moments, placing him in danger of exposure.

- Reprinted as "The Boy From Jupiter" from October 31, 1970, to March 13, 1971.

== Jingo Jones and His Invisibiliser ==
Published: February 23, 1952, to July 4, 1953
Writer: L.E. Ransome (as Tom Stirling)

Young Jingo is given an Invisibiliser by his eccentric uncle Septimus. The device produced a ray that could turn anything invisible until the reverse control was activated. Jones and best friend Bob Day used this as a boon to combat local bullies and spivs.

- Text story.

== Jinks ==
Published: June 25, 1966, to February 15, 1969
Cartoonist: André Franquin

Jinks' wish to simply have some peace and quiet at home is constantly undermined by innumerable catastrophes, usually caused by one of his oddball acquaintances.

- Only made sporadic appearances. Modified version of Modeste et Pompon from Tintin; continued from The Champion

== Johnny Dynamite ==
Published: October 14, 1967, to December 23, 1967
Artists: D'Ami Studio

Johnny embarks on a boxing career to save his family's business.

- Reprinted from Sun.

== Jungle Jef ==
Published: October 19, 1957, to October 10, 1959
Writer: Rex King

Raised in the jungle by animals, Jef and his 'family' – Cheeko the chimpanzee, Boko the parrot and Tusker the elephant – try to avoid getting eaten by lion Yellow fang.

== Karl the Viking ==
Published: October 29, 1960, to September 26, 1964
Writer: Ted Cowan, Michael Moorcock
Artist: Don Lawrence

Viking chieftain Eingar takes a shine to Saxon orphan Karl, taking him back to his village. When Eingar dies Karl takes up leadership of the tribe with cousin Godwulf as his right-hand man, leading them in battles to fend off the Picts, the callous Earl of Eastumbria and legendary monsters.

- The strip was initially called "The Sword of Eingar" before being renamed after the protagonist from the second story. Ken Bulmer co-created the character with Cowan and Lawrence. The complete series was collection across two volumes by Rebellion Developments as part of the Treasury of British Comics series – Karl the Viking Volume 1 – The Sword of Eingar compiled the material from October 29, 1960, to December 1, 1962; Karl the Viking Volume 2 – The Voyage of the Sea Raiders contained the strips from December 8, 1962, to September 26, 1964, as well as material from Lion Annuals.

== The King of Keg Island ==
Published: November 14, 1970, to March 13, 1971
Artist: Tom Kerr

Peter Cable is an orphan and is stunned when he finds a distant relative has left him the deed to Keg Island. He begins to move in to his new land along with a trio of friends from the orphanage, but former custodian Simon Lashley plans to swindle him out of his windfall.

== Knuckles Nixon – The Boxing Trapper ==
Published: March 22, 1958, to August 16, 1958
Writer: Ray Marr

Fur trapper Knuckles Nixon uses his pugilistic skills to see off unwelcome visitors to Lone Pines, aided by native American friend Night Owl.

- Text story.

== Larry West – Cowboy Outlaw ==
Published: January 25, 1958, to October 11, 1958
Writer: Cliff Hooper

Cowhand Larry West and Mexican pardner Pedro are forced to go on the run when they are framed for a stagecoach robbery by the corrupt Sheriff of Sunset City and the Red Diamond Gang.

== The Last of the Harkers ==
Published: October 16, 1971, to May 18, 1974
Artist: John Stokes

Jug-eared Joe Harker is the sole surviving member of the Harker sporting dynasty. With help from the ghost of similarly endowed ancestor Sir Stanley Harker and his own stretchy arms, Joe is able to excel at numerous sporting events and refill the family's trophy cabinets, while rag-and-bone men Bert and Arnold Swizzle schemed to stop him so they could take over Harker Hall on the cheap.

- The story was not continued when Lion merged into Valiant.

== Law of the Legion ==
Published: May 15, 1965, to August 7, 1965

British agent John Law goes undercover to flush out a traitor hiding in the French Foreign Legion.

== Lightning Stormm ==
Published: May 3, 1969, to November 29, 1969
Writer: Ken Mennell
Artists: Barrie Mitchell, Ian Kennedy

After being seriously injured in a crash, top racing driver Dan Stormm is unable to walk and moves into team management. His team, the Slambangers, included his long-term mechanic Cappy Ricks, run young rough diamond drivers Tommy Kidd and the Boyd brothers Pete and Rod.

- A continuation of "Lightning Strikes Again" from Eagle. After 12 issues the story was renamed "Tales from the Tracks", switching to a format of Stormm narrating former glories from his racing career.

== Lofty Lightyear ==
Published: June 11, 1966, to March 2, 1968

Professor Von Nutkaze helps a freakishly tall alien stay out of the clutches of a persistent flying saucer.

- Occasional one-page humour strip, previously featured in The Champion.

== The Lone Commandos ==
Published: February 23, 1952, to July 26, 1952
Writer: Edward R. Home-Gall

In 1943, Commandos Sgt. Roy Tempest and Pte. Jack Steel are tasked with a dangerous mission to destroy a German radar station in occupied France.

== Lost in Limbo Land ==
Published: October 13, 1973, to December 8, 1973

Writer: Chris Lowder Artist: José Muñoz A bookish boy is reading up on Norse mythology when a bolt of lightning transports him back to Viking times.

== Lost Pals of 9 Platoon ==
Published: February 6, 1954, to September 18, 1954
Writer: Cliff Hooper

After finding themselves behind Italian lines, British soldiers Joe Dale and Shorty Brown wage a campaign of asymmetrical warfare.

== Lucky Guffy ==
Published: June 22, 1957, to September 10, 1960

Juvenile Guffy undertakes a variety of endeavours that initially seems to be going badly but ends up working out in his favour.

- A one-page humour strip that resided on the back cover. Later appearances were more spasmodic.

== Maroc the Mighty ==
Published: May 8, 1965, to June 4, 1966
Writer: Michael Moorcock
Artist: Don Lawrence

On his journey home from the Crusades in the 13th century, John Maroc discovers the ancient bracelet of Sun Warrior Zar. The Hand of Zar makes him invulnerable and superhumanly strong when the bangle is in sunlight, helping him fight his way back towards his home in Devon.

- "Maroc the Mighty" was devised as a replacement for "Karl the Viking", and was initially called "The Hand of Zar". The story was reprinted from October 3, 1970, to March 6, 1971.

== Marooned Shipmates of Shark Island ==
Published: September 28, 1957, to March 1, 1958
Writer: Ray Marr

After getting shipwrecked on an island surrounded by shark-infested waters, Jerry Morgan and two other survivors – Irish stoker Conner O'Conner and Aborigine Bingo – try to make the deserted landmass habitable as they await rescue.

- A text story which incorporated detailed explanations of survival and scouting tips for readers.

== Marty Wayne ==
Published: July 7, 1973, to May 18, 1974
Artist: Fred Holmes

Wannabe TV star Marty Wayne's ventriloquist skills and uncanny impressions land him a surprise role as an agent of MI5.

- The story was not continued after the merger with Valiant.

== Masters of Menace ==
Published: September 22, 1973, to May 18, 1974
Artist: John Catchpole

After escaping death and being inadvertently rescued by Nick Dexter and Ron Redding, Professor Krait seeks out Ezra Creech and the pair pool their resources in a bid for world conquest.

- Featuring a team-up between the villains from "Shadow of the Snake" and "White Eyes". The story was not continued after the merger with Valiant.

== Max Malone of the Secret Service ==
Published: August 24, 1957, to October 10, 1959
Writer: Trevor Hugh

Special agent Max Malone and sidekick Hitch Hall frustrate the machinations of the Japanese in World War II.

- A text story.

== The Mind Stealers ==
Published: December 28, 1968, to April 26, 1969
Artist: Tom Kerr

Schoolboys Steve Smith and Bob Jones investigate a haunted mansion, only to find it full of alien blobs who can control minds. The rest of the village rapidly falls under their control as the lads try to raise the alarm.

== Morg of the Mammoths ==
Published: October 19, 1963, to January 18, 1964
Artist: Harry Bishop

Neolithic tribesman Morg is banished from his village after refusing to kill a mammoth. Once out in the tundra, Morg finds himself adopted by the mammoth, who he names Karga.

== Mowser ==
Published: February 22, 1964, to May 18, 1974
Cartoonist: Reg Parlett

In Crummy Castle sly, supine housecat Mowser constantly comes out on top in struggles with his nemesis James the Butler.

- Humour strip; initially half a page, but up to the full back page by 1966. By the seventies, the strip often absent or using reprints.

== Murphy's Magic Mauler ==
Published: November 23, 1968, to April 26, 1969
Artist: Solano López

Gullible cowpoke Joe Murphy believes himself to be in possession of a magic belt. He isn't, but a combination of his increased confidence and good luck mean things tend to work out for him anyway, and Murphy is unflinching in his faith in the pants-retainer.

== Oddball Oates ==
Published: May 3, 1969, to November 7, 1970
Writer: Donne Avenell
Artist: Tom Kerr

Weedy botanist Albert Oates discovers a formula that transforms his body into an athletic marvel. He uses this to win numerous sporting events while keeping his secret formula out of the hands of evil-doers led by Doctor Vulpex.

== Operation Fire-Mountain ==
Published: February 26, 1955, to August 27, 1955
Writer: Rex King
Artist: Peter Gallant

Max Steel and a group of demobbed Commandos investigate the mysterious Fire-Mountain Island at the behest of the Secret Service.

== Paddy Payne ==
Published: July 27, 1957, to March 13, 1971
Writers: Mark Ross, Val Holding
Artists: Joe Colquhoun, Bill Lacey, Ian Kennedy

RAF pilot Paddy Payne and his trusty wingman Dick 'Dicko' Smith defend the skies. Payne was a talented aircraft racer before the war, and served in the Battle of Britain flying a Spitfire. By 1942 Payne was a Squadron Leader and 'troubleshooter', shipped from unit to unit for tricky missions. Later Paddy's number two became the eager but luckless Pete Prendergast.

Payne's role serve in many theatres. In Europe, he was involved defending England from Luftwaffe bombers and V-1s; pathfinding for bombing missions to Germany; protecting the English Channel from U-Boats before bombing their pens in Kiel; sinking the battleship Tirnhorst in a Norwegian fjord; defending Malta; working with partisans to liberate Yugoslavia; thwarting crack Luftwaffe hunter-killer unit the Double Eagles; destroying secret German weapons like the Viper rocket-fighter and old racing opponent Von Engel's dirigible-mounted Sun-Gun, aiding the French Resistance and capturing Field marshal Reichstag. In the Middle East, he supported the Eighth Army from Cairo ahead of the Battle of Alamein, while in the Pacific he was responsible for frustrating a Japanese invasion of India from a Royal Navy battlegroup centered on aircraft carrier HMS Swiftsure, and leading a squadron of raw recruits against Japanese ace Major Kimura over the Coral Sea.

While initially seen in a Spitfire (including a fictional float-equipped version that suffered no significant loss of performance), Paddy's missions took in a wide variety of planes – his logbook contained Beaufighter, Lancaster, Mosquito, Wildcat, Avenger, Kingfisher, Hurricane, Sunderland, Skua, Seamew, Catalina, Kittyhawk, Mustang, Anson, Horsa, Typhoon, Wellington, Helldiver, Tempest, Lysander, Arsenal-Delanne 10, Marauder, Defiant, Nieuport 17 and Gladiator types. Paddy's ability to end up behind enemy lines also saw him try his hand with captured Axis aircraft, including a Bf 109, a Bf 110, a SM.79, a Fw 190, a Stuka, a Do 26, a Ju 88 and even an experimental German helicopter.

- The stories did not always run in chronological order – for example, the first serial took place in 1942, while one set during the Battle of Britain was run years later. From 1957 Paddy Payne took over the colour cover of Lion until 1964. In 1967 the strip stopped while features from The Champion were incorporated before returning in 1968 and running for another year.

== The Phantom Viking ==
Published: 11 June 1966, to 3 August 1968
Writer: Donne Avenell
Artist: José Ortiz, Nevio Zeccara

Nebbish teacher Olaf Larson finds a mystical helmet belonging to one of his Norse antecedents at a Viking burial site. Donning the headgear gave him the ability to turn into the mighty Phantom Viking – a popular hero, in contrast to the awkward teacher mocked as "Loopy Larson" by his Woodburn School pupils. The Phantom Viking's only weakness was that his powers would disappear when the a south wind blew. Despite his pronounced general air of weakness, Larsen attracted sympathy from beautiful secretary Helen Yates.

- The strip was inherited from the short-lived revival of The Champion, where it had debuted on 26 February 1966.

== The Plants Of Peril ==
Published: May 15, 1965, to July 24, 1965

Hydrapods – living and dangerous plants – stalk the English countryside while Professor Paul Loder and assistant Whittaker attempt to devise a way to stop them.

- Reprinted as "Menace of the Killer Plants" in the 1971 Lion Annual.

== Rebels of Ancient Rome! ==
Published: August 16, 1952, to March 7, 1953
Writer: Ted Cowan
Artist: Alan Philpott

In the reign of Emperor Nero, enslaved brothers Cardoc, Granus and Edric seem set to be freed by their noble owner Mercius until he is tricked by rival Gelda. The three Britons are then forced to go on the run.

== Return of the Stormtroopers ==
Published: July 9, 1966, to August 27, 1966
Artist: Eric Bradbury

A forgotten Nazi army led by General Von Stern awaken in 2046 after being cryogenically frozen in the last days of World War II. Finding an enlightened society which has long eschewed weapons, the unit swiftly conquers Britain but have to contend with a resistance led by plucky Bill Churchill.

- Continued from The Champion.

== Robot Archie ==
Published: February 23, 1952, to August 9, 1952; February 2, 1957, to May 18, 1974
Writers: Ted Cowan
Artists: Ted Kearon

Pals Ted Ritchie and Ken Dale are given control of a powerful robot created by Ritchie's uncle, which they use to hunt for treasure in the jungles of Africa and South America.

- The characters initially appeared in "The Jungle Robot" before returning in "Archie the Robot Explorer" in 1957. Later years saw much use of reprints. The story was not continued in Valiant after the merger as a regular feature but did make a six-week "guest appearance".

== Rod of the Trading Post ==
Published: February 23, 1952, to September 13, 1952
Writer: R. G. Thomas

Frontier trading post owner Rod Fleming helps passers-by in times of trouble.

- Text story.

== Rory MacDuff ==
Published: October 24, 1959, to February 6, 1965
Artists: Geoff Campion, Fred Holmes, Reg Bunn

Initially a stuntman and investigator, MacDuff's talents later saw him recruited to join the Allies' efforts in World War II.

== Sandy Dean ==
Published: February 23, 1952, to February 6, 1965
Writers: Barry Nelson, George Forrest
Artists: Selby Dennison

A smart and honest pupil at boarding school Tollington, Sandy helps out friends like bespectacled best chums Jack Hardy and 'Owl' Watson, swots up on his prep, plays sport and deals with bullies like 'Bossy' Bates and prefect 'Haughty' Hawkins. Further down the line the school was even involved in an espionage plot when Bates was bribed by nefarious foreign Eastern European agents.

- The strip was initially called "Sandy Dean's First Term" before being renamed "Sandy Dean's Schooldays" later in 1952. It retained this title until 1961 (throughout which Sandy remained in the fourth form), when it was renamed "Tales of Tollgate School" until 1964. Subsequently, the series switched to smaller storylines – "The Rock That Rocked Tollgate", "Tollgate at Sea!", "The Tollgate Treasure Hunters" and "Sandy Dean and the Ghost Ship" in 1964, and finally "Sandy Dean and the Pirates" in 1965, the last storyline before the strip was dropped.

== Sark the Sleeper ==
Published: December 15, 1973, to May 18, 1974
Writer: Frank S. Pepper
Artist: José Muñoz

Sole survivor of a deep space mission sent a thousand years before, Sark is awakened in the Badlands of the future by two boys called Val and Greg.

- The story was not continued in Valiant after the merger.

== Secret Mission to Norway ==
Published: December 10, 1955, to August 18, 1956
Writer: Frank S. Pepper (credited as Hal Wilton)
Artist: Brian O'Hanlon

Royal Marines Lofty Baker and Tub Cook return from a mission in Nazi-occupied Norway only to be sent back again to extract brilliant scientist Larsen.

== The Secret Tunnellers of Calitz Camp ==
Published: June 27, 1953, to January 30, 1954
Writer: Rex King

Sergeant Wilson and Andy "The Trickster" Ellis plot to be the first ever escapees from the fearsome Black Forest prisoner-of-war camp Calitz.

== Secrets of the Demon Dwarf ==
Published: October 28, 1972, to March 17, 1973
Artist: Alfonso Font

After helping the Black Max, evil scientific genius Doktor Gratz accidentally places himself in suspended animation and reawakens in the present day, where he plans to avenge Germany's defeat in World War I. Special Agent Bill Wilson plans to stop him.

- A spin-off from "Black Max".

== Shadow of the Snake ==
Published: October 28, 1972, to September 15, 1973
Writer: Angus Allan
Artist: John Catchpole

Evil scientist Professor Krait terrorises the world as supervillain the Snake. Able to wriggle through any gap and hypnotise his prey, the Snake also spoke in a hissing voice.

- After his own story ended, the Snake would return to partner Professor Creech in "Masters of Menace". The character has no relation to the Spider adversary of the same name.

== The Silver Colt ==
Published: August 1, 1964, to July 17, 1965
Artist: Ian Kennedy

The travels of a Colt pistol cast in silver intended for a frontier lawman that ends up passing through various unintended owners. The Colt moved forward in time with each owner until last being glimpsed on a World War I battlefield.

== The Sludge ==
Published: February 13, 1965, to June 12, 1965
Writer: Ted Cowan
Artist: Bill Lacey

Emerging from the sea, the monstrous Sludge moves across the world, possessing any machinery it comes into touch with, and reforming after any attempt to destroy it. The focal point of resistance against the substance were Canadian newsmen Bill Hanley and Rick Slade.

- Hanley and Slade had been introduced in "The Whirlpool of Weed"; both the intrepid pair and the Sludge would be featured again in sequel "Return of the Sludge" in the 1967 Lion Annual. The Sludge would later emerge a third time to do battle with Robot Archie in 1970, and reappeared in Rebellion Developments' The Vigilant.

== The Speed Kings ==
Published: January 13, 1968, to May 11, 1968; August 10, 1968, to October 5, 1968
Artist: Barracuda

Professional daredevil brothers Sandy and Joe try to earn a job from the mysterious Mr. Kelsey with their reckless bravery and mechanical ingenuity.

== Spellbinder ==
Published: May 3, 1969, to May 18, 1974
Writer: Frank S. Pepper
Artist: Geoff Campion

Tom Turville inherits crumbling family home Turville Hall. Once inside he is stunned to find his ancestor Sylvester Turville, who had accidentally magically frozen himself in time some 200 years earlier. Upon awakening, he becomes fast friends with Tom, with the pair having to thwart greedy solicitor Mr. Crabtree and his muscle Silas Manson, who thought the house contained treasure, and other parties bent on stealing Sylvester's powerful Philosophers' Stone.

- Originally titled "Turville's Touchstone" before being renamed for the second story, "Spellbinder" was briefly continued in the Valiant Book of Mystery and Magic.

== The Spider ==
Published: June 26, 1965, to April 26, 1969
Writers: Ted Cowan, Jerry Siegel, Ken Mennell
Artist: Reg Bunn

The Spider is a master criminal of hazy origins who uses his genius and his army of crime - including safe cracking idiot savant Roy Ordini and amoral scientist Prof Pelham – to become the 'King of Crooks'.

- Several stories were reprinted in Lion from April 22, 1972, to December 8, 1973.

== Square-Deal Dawson ==
Published: September 20, 1952, to May 2, 1953
Writer: R. G. Thomas

A Mountie who patrolled Frozen Hills in North-west Canada, an area plagued by criminal activity despite its sparse population and barren, remote geography.

- Text story.

== Steel Commando ==
Published: March 20, 1971, to May 18, 1974
Writer: Frank S. Pepper
Artist: Alex Henderson

In World War II, Professor Brayne devises the Mark 1 Indestructible Robot for the British Army. Unfortunately a programming error means the fearsome war machine will only respond to the voice of Lance corporal Ernest "Excused Boots" Bates, a Cockney layabout. Nevertheless, the pair are sent into combat in France with successful results – at least whenever Bates feels like ordering 'Ironsides' into battle.

- Continued from Thunder. After the merger with Valiant, the Steel Commando teamed up with Captain Hurricane. The character made an unnamed cameo in Albion before returning in The Vigilant.

== Stitch in Time ==
Published: March 24, 1973, to August 18, 1973
Artist: José Muñoz

Boy menace "Stitch" Cotton is such a neighbourhood menace his behaviour is noticed by intergalactic despot Mister Universe, who plans to train him alongside the similarly bratty Varl of Voltar as his apprentice. However, the pair steal Universe's time machine and irritate people throughout history instead.

== Stowaway on the Sea-Hawk ==
Published: May 18, 1954, to October 2, 1954
Writer: Ted Cowan

After his father mysteriously disappears serving on the HMS Seahawk, Mark Darrell sneaks aboard to investigate sinister visually-challenged bosun Patch-Eye.

== Swords of the Sea-Wolves ==
Published: January 21, 1967, to June 24, 1967

In ancient Denmark, a sinister fungus begins taking over the population and putting the control of an entity called Helvid; Rolf the Viking leads the battle against the takeover.

- The story was modified reprints of "Karl the Viking".

== Stringbean and Hambone ==
Published: February 7, 1970, to July 18, 1970
Artist: Solano López

A legacy of Chinese curiosities from his uncle plunges Hamish McBone and his friend Alfie Bean into the middle of a Tong plot when they discover a magic gem which transforms them from inept wrestlers to a winning tag team.

== Sweeper Sam ==
Published: July 25, 1970, to March 6, 1971
Artist: Solano Lopez

Friendly lug and street-sweeper Sam attempts to become a wrestler.

== The Team Terry Kept in a Box ==
Published: July 28, 1973, to May 18, 1974
Writer: Frank S. Pepper
Artist: Mike White

Football fan Terry Turner discovers a box of vintage stereoscopic Anstey Albion photos belong to his uncle. When viewed the long-gone legends come to life, and Terry puts them into action to improve the fortunes of the penniless current version of his beloved club.

- The story was not continued in Valiant after the merger.

== Tex Radley – The Rancher from the Circus Ring ==
Published: October 18, 1958, to September 5, 1959
Writer: Cliff Hooper

After a successful career in a Wild West travelling circus, Tex Radley inherits a ranch and settles down with buddy Jud Clegg – only to find crooked neighbour Spencer Duke is scheming to take their spread for himself.

- Text story.

== Texas Jack ==
Published: April 30, 1966, to November 16, 1968
Artists: Geoff Campion, Fred Holmes, Jesús Blasco

A close friend of Wild Bill Hickok, Colonel Jonathan Morningstar leads his United States Cavalry by example from horse Fury.

- A redrawn version of "Buffalo Bill" from The Comet, with Bill's fictionalised adventures reworked to be those of a fictionalised version of Texas Jack Omohundro.

== The Toughest Team in the League ==
Published: August 23, 1958, to April 25, 1959
Writer: John Marshall

Player-manager of Division Four football team Redhaven Rangers, the talented Billy Keen struggles to keep good results coming in while balancing the club's parlous budget.

- Text story.

== The Treasure-Hunt Twins ==
Published: August 25, 1973, to October 6, 1973

Twins flee the orphanage when the strict governor attempts to get rid of their pet Labrador. Given a ramshackle houseboat by a sympathetic stranger, the boys discover a treasure map aboard and set out to seek their fortune.

== Trelawney of the Guards ==
Published: July 9, 1966, to April 20, 1968
Artists: Víctor de la Fuente, José Ortiz, Giorgio Trevisan

Doughty Sergeant Trelawney of the Grenadier Guards leads his unit into battle in World War II.

- Early strips included fact pages on the history of the British Infantry. Like Paddy Payne, the stories often shifted backwards and forwards chronologically. From July 29, 1967, the story was renamed "Trelawny's Mob".

== Vic Gunn ==
Published: February 29, 1964, to May 28, 1966
Artist: Geoff Campion

A tough secret agent in an alternate Britain, Vic Gunn and assistant Tubby fight to free the country from the evil Baron Rudolph. Rudolph has devised a sound weapon that paralyses much of the population and runs Britain as a police state.

- Gunn debuted in "Britain in Chains" and remained the focus when it was renamed "Public Enemy No. 1" and then "The Battle for Liverpool". Later storylines featured the character's name in the title.

== Voyage on the Hoodoo Whaler ==
Published: April 16, 1955, to May 19, 1956
Writer: Ted Cowan

Whaling in the Arctic on board the Polar Fox, Kirk Branston discovers first mate Matt Judley has sold the crew out to their rivals on the Sea Wolf.

== The Waxer ==
Published: May 3, 1969, to September 27, 1969
Writer: Ken Mennell
Artists: Reg Bunn,

Septimus Creech was once curator of the now-decaying Palace of Villainy waxworks museum. Able to make wax figures of history's most evil men and send them on criminal rampages. His activity attracts attention from PC Mick Martin but his tales of a highwayman in 20th century Britain see him drummed off the force. Martin resolves to expose Creech's schemes and clear his name.

- Inherited from Eagle.

== Whacker ==
Published: June 11, 1966, to July 23, 1966

Liverpudlians Whacker and Mac move to a tumbledown country house Hardnutt Hall. In the garage they find an old jalopy fitted with a computer brain that takes them on adventures.

- The story originally began in The Champion, and was a modified version of "Starter" from Spirou.

== What Did You Do in the War, Dad? ==
Published: April 24, 1965, to January 1, 1966
Artist: Bruno Marraffa

A boy quizzes his father over his service in World War II. After initially boasting of various heroics, the elder is ultimately revealed to have greatly exaggerated or otherwise fudged some menial or bizarre antic.

== The Whirlpool of Weed ==
Published: June 19, 1965, to October 9, 1965
Artist: Bill Lacey

Canadian journalists Bill Hanley and Rick Slade discover a huge island of seaweed moving across the Atlantic. It is under the control of Diodin, who plans to use his army of sea creatures to take over America.

- Hanley and Slade would subsequently return in "The Sludge".

== The White-Eyes ==
Published: January 29, 1972, to October 21, 1972
Artist: John Catchpole

A gas turns people into white-eyed, superhumanly powerful aggressors. Later, megalomaniac Ezra Creech exposes himself to the gas and targets the island of Doomcrag as the first step towards global domination, but local boys Nick Dexter and Don Redding plan to stop him.

- Creech is not shown to be related to Septimus Creech from "The Waxer" but did later team up with The Snake in "Masters of Menace".

== Wiz and Lofty – Speed Specialists ==
Published: July 5, 1952, to February 28, 1953
Writer: L.E. Ransome (as Victor Norman)

Wiz Hardy and partner Lawrence "Lofty" Duff are daredevils for hire, testing all manner of experimental vehicles.

- Text story.

== Zip Nolan ==
Published: January 19, 1963, to May 18, 1974
Writers: Frank S. Pepper, Michael Moorcock
Artists: Ted Kearon, Reg Bunn, Fred Holmes, Roberto Diso, Artur Puig, Joe Colquhoun

An American highway patrolman from Pensburgh, equipped with detective skills and a Harley Davidson Electra Glide motorcycle. Nolan often clashed with desk-riding superior Captain Brinker over his hunches, and as such usually ended up taking down the criminal single-handedly after divining his guilt. At one point both Nolan and Brinker were sent to England for six months to study British police techniques.

- The character debuted in straightforward detective strip "Zip Nolan – Highway Patrol" before being reconfigured as the 'interactive' "Spot the Clue with Zip Nolan". Nolan would thus spend parts of the strip breaking the fourth wall, firstly to directly invite the reader's help and then in a wrap-up to explain the crime after apprehending the villain of the week. The strip continued in Valiant after the merger, albeit in reprint form. Nolan himself appeared as a major character in Albion.
