= Adam Eterno =

Comic book character

- Adam Eterno on the cover to the 1972 Lion and Thunder Holiday Special.

Character information
- First appearance: Thunder October 17, 1970 (October 1970)
- Created by: Jack Le Grand; Tom Tully

In-story information
- Full name: Adam Eterno
- Species: Enhanced human
- Place of origin: Earth
- Abilities: Immortality; Near-invulnerability; Enhanced strength

Publication information
- Publisher: Fleetway Publications
- Schedule: Weekly
- Title(s): Thunder (1970-1971); Lion (1971-1974); Valiant (1974-1976)
- Publication date: October 1970 – October 1976

Creative team
- Writer(s): Tom Tully; Ted Cowan; Donne Avenell; Scott Goodall
- Artist(s): Tom Kerr; Francisco Solano López; Eric Bradbury; Joe Colquhoun; John Catchpole; Colin Page; Carlos Cruz

Adam Eterno is a fictional British comic book superhero who has appeared in comics published by Fleetway Publications and, since 2018, Rebellion Developments. The character was created by Jack Le Grand and Tom Tully, debuting in the first issue of Thunder in October 1970.

== Publishing history ==
The character was created by Thunder editor Jack Le Grand (who had co-devised "The Steel Claw") and Tom Tully. On October 17, 1970, Adam Eterno debuted in a self-titled strip in the first issue of Fleetway's new Thunder weekly anthology which also introduced robotic soldier Steel Commando and supernatural pilot Black Max. The prolific writer Tully would write the strip, while initial episodes were drawn by artist Tom Kerr. Partway through the run, Francisco Solano López took over art duties from Kerr, and would be considered the character's definitive artist. However, Thunder was to be short-lived and after only 22 issues it merged with Fleetway's long-running Lion from 20 March 1971. Adam Eterno survived the merger, and Ted Cowan took over as writer. Lion editor Chris Lowder heavily edited Cowan's scripts, feeling he was a "fine storyteller" but describing his dialogue as "wretched"; he also took the opportunity to insert references to the work of Robert E. Howard into the stories.

"Adam Eterno" would run in the pages of Lion until May 1974, when Lion itself merge with Valiant due to declining sales. Again Adam Eterno continued - until October 1976, when Valiant was folded into Battle and the strip ended.

During this period the character also appeared in various specials and annuals span off from Thunder, Lion and Valiant. While Tully and López remained the primary creative team others also contributed, including writers Ted Cowan, Donne Avenell and Scott Goodall, as well as artists Eric Bradbury, Joe Colquhoun, John Catchpole, Colin Page and Carlos Cruz. Adam Eterno's adventures were also printed outside the UK, including in France (in Mon Journal's long-running Janus Stark title), Portugal (in a Portugal Press one-shot compilation) and Australia (in the 1983 anthology Reverie).

In Britain, the character spent the next 40 years to occasional cameo appearances (such as in the 1992 2000 AD Action Special, and the 2000 AD strip "Stickleback"). When numerous IPC/Fleetway characters were revived for the WildStorm mini-series Albion questions as to the character's legal status reduced Adam Eterno to a brief cameo as the series was limited to the pre-1970 characters then owned by TimeUK. Correspondence between Egmont and British Comics expert John Freeman in 2008 confirmed that the former still owned the character.

The rights to IPC/Fleetway's post-1970 properties were then purchased by Rebellion Developments in 2016. Rebellion subsequently appealed to fans for physical issues of Thunder to fill gaps in their archives, leading to speculation that the likes of Adam Eterno and Black Max would be reprinted.

In 2018 the character was given a key role in revival one-shot The Vigilant, though he was not selected as a member of the eponymous team. Shortly afterwards the character's earliest adventures were compiled in Adam Eterno - A Hero of All Time as part of Rebellion's Treasury of British Comics collections, featuring a cover by Chris Weston.

== Fictional character biography ==
Adam Eterno was the surly, bitter assistant to 16th century alchemist Erasmus Hemlock. When Hemlock succeeded in his life's work and was able to distil the powerful Elixir of Life. Believing he was more worthy, Adam spitefully drank the tincture himself. Enraged, Hemlock cursed him to immortality that could only be ended by a weapon of pure gold. In the resulting argument the alchemist's laboratory caught fire, and a repentant Eterno was unable to get Hemlock to safety before he was overcome by smoke. Initially Adam revelled in his immortality, but eventually grew weary and began hoping his life would end. Over the next 300 years he fought in the Napoleonic Wars and World War I but his unusual abilities prevented him finding any acceptance.

By 1970 he was still wandering the Earth aimlessly when he was struck by the car of Greek millionaire Hymis Metataxis. As the vehicle was gold-plated it did not kill Adam but instead sent him back 200 years in history. There a run-in with pirates altered his worldview and he decided to task his abilities and experience to protecting the innocent. He would later drift between other points in history, propelled by the winds of fate.

Doctor Sin later reveals that Adam is a cosmic force of nature given physical form, and that he created his own origin to rationalise his own existence. His importance to the time stream meant that when he was disabled by the Iron Major in Russia in 1943 a series of temporal anomalies struck Earth in the 21st century. Doctor von Hoffman imprisoned Adam in the automaton Zenga. Sin's team of heroes, the Forgotten, were able to weather the resulting Totality Storm and release Adam, who returns to his customary role of patrolling the timestream.

== Other appearances ==
- The character is mentioned in Patrick McCabe's award-winning 1992 novel The Butcher Boy.
- Paul Grist's Jack Staff series features a homage character called the Eternal Warrior based on Adam Eterno.
