= The Leopard from Lime Street =

Comic strip

- Cover to the first collected edition.

Publication information
- Publisher: IPC Magazines Ltd; Fleetway
- First appearance: Buster #802 (27 March 1976)
- Created by: Tom Tully; Eric Bradbury; Mike Western

In-story information
- Alter ego: William "Billy" Farmer
- Species: Human mutate
- Notable aliases: The Leopard Man; The Leopard
- Abilities: Enhanced strength; Enhanced agility; Enhanced speed; Enhanced endurance; Enhanced senses

The Leopard from Lime Street is a comic strip appearing in the British comic Buster from 1976 to 1985. Written by Tom Tully, it was drawn in a 'realistic' comic style by Mike Western and Eric Bradbury, much like Marvel Comics's Spider-Man comic (to which it bears numerous similarities), in direct contrast to the stylized cartoony style of the rest of Buster.

== Publishing history ==
=== Original run ===
The strip appeared regularly in Buster from 27 March 1976 to 18 May 1985, also appearing in annuals and specials spun off from the title. The weekly instalments were typically three pages long, and printed in black and white. "The Leopard of Lime Street" briefly returned to the pages of Buster in 1990, with a selection of reprints being recoloured and ran between 14 April and 5 May. The strips were translated and published in French, in the comic Sunny Sun and in Greek in the Blek comics series (where it was translated as "Panther Kid"), mostly during the 80s. The origin of The Leopard from Lime Street was reprinted in the independent comic Starscape, along with the final published adventure from the Buster Annual 1987.

=== Revivals ===
The Leopard of Lime Street was one of the superheroes assembled to fight the Lloigor in the 2000 AD strip Zenith. After having his appearance openly mocked by the strip's title character he was sent to a parallel Earth known as Alternative-666. The group were ambushed at a London Underground by the Lloigor, and the Leopard was killed when the Lloigor-possessed Mr. Why snapped his neck (in the same frame as another Buster-originated character, Fishboy, was also killed).

An adult version of the character referred to as simply "The Leopard" appeared in Rebellion Publishing's 2000AD Presents: The Vigilant in 2018 as a member of a super team alongside the likes of Adam Eterno, Doctor Sin and the Steel Commando. This was written by Simon Furman, with art by Simon Coleby. A second one-shot by the same team, 2000AD Presents: The Vigilant – Legacy, followed in 2019.

A new story Totem (again written by Furman and illustrated by Laurent Lefeuvre) was published in Rebellion's Monster Fun Halloween Spooktacular in October 2021, and the strip was in the re-launched Monster Fun in April 2022 (and every two months until April 2023, then monthly from June 2023),

==== Story lines in Monster Fun ====
- "Totem": Written by Simon Furman, Illustrated by Laurent Lefeuvre.
- "Birthright" (11 parts in total):

- Part 1 was titled Birthright; part 2 was titled Nocturne; parts 3 onward were not individually titled.

- Written by Simon Furman (all parts).
- Illustrated by Laurent Lefeuvre (parts 1–3); Nicke Roche (parts 4–5), P. J. Holden (parts 6–11)
- Colours by John-Paul Bove (parts 4–11).
- Letters by Laurent Lefeuvre (parts 1–3); O.J. Sanchez (part 4); SquakeZz (parts 6–11).

== Fictional character biography ==
Billy Farmer lived with his Aunt Joan and Uncle Charlie in the fictional town of Selbridge, where the 13-year-old attended secondary school, where he was often bullied. Billy was also the editor, sole writer and photographer for his school magazine, Farmer's World, and as such was sent to take pictures for the publication at a nearby zoological institute run by Professor Jarman. There he was scratched by a radioactive leopard called Sheba, and after returning home found he had enhanced strength, speed, reflexes and agility after an altercation with his abusive uncle. Billy quickly realises he has been granted the abilities of a leopard as a result of the scratch, including a "leopard sixth sense". To hide his identity, he reworks his costume from a school pantomime Puss-in-Boots costume and decides to use it to foil the dangerous burglar known as the Cat-Man. He not only captures the robber and delivers him to the police, but is also able to snap a picture of the criminal in action, which he attempts to sell to Thaddeus Clegg, editor of the local newspaper Selbridge Sun, who believes he has faked the shot and refuses to buy it.

Thereafter Billy has to balance fighting crime with enduring the bullying of both his uncle and other pupils, realising that fighting back with his new powers could kill them. However, he does find various other ways to show them up. He also tries to carve out a career at the Selbridge Sun, where Clegg frequently tries to exploit Billy while simultaneously trying to find out more about the mysterious crime-fighting 'Leopardman'.

Much of the story and format bore a strong resemblance to Spider-Man, including the origin and nature of his powers, an orphan with a kindly but frail aunt, the distrust the Leopardman suffers from both the police and the press; Billy being the target of bullies, but realising he cannot use his powers against them; the unwitting newspaper editor searching to expose the hero, while unaware his alter ego is in his employ; and so forth. The main differences, beyond the small-town British slant, are that Billy's uncle not only lives but is an aggressive, antagonistic presence; and that while the Leopard occasionally fights costumed criminals such as Cat-Man, circus acrobat Vampello and thief Snow-Beast, they had no powers and mixed in with more mundane criminals such as arsonists and thieves.

== Collected editions ==
=== Rebellion collections of original strips ===
The series has been republished in trade paperbacks by Rebellion Publishing as part of The Treasury of British Comics. The limited hardback editions were available exclusively from the 2000 AD / Treasury of British Comics webstores (for Volume 1, this included a numbered bookplate and art print) – the hardback editions for volumes 1 and 2 used the same ISBN as the TP versions, whereas volume 3 had different ISBNs for both HB and TP editions:

Title	ISBN (pb)	ISBN (hb)	Hardbacks Issued	Release date	Originally Serialised
The Leopard From Lime Street Book 1	9781781085974		200	12 Jul 2017	Buster from 27 March 1976 – 11 June 1977
The Leopard From Lime Street Book 2	9781781086780		250	12 Jun 2019	Buster from 18 June 1977 – 15 July 1978
The Leopard From Lime Street Book 3	9781786188304	9781837860364	tbc	15 Mar 2023	Buster from 22 July 1978 – 29 September 1979

=== Collections of Monster Fun Revival stories ===
Title	ISBN	Release date	Originally Serialised
The Leopard From Lime Street: Birthright	9781837861910	18 Jul 2027	Monster Fun Issues 1-11
