= Gadgetman and Gimmick-Kid =

British comic book story

- Gadgetman (left) and Gimmick-Kid on the cover of the 6 July 1968 edition of Lion. Art by Geoff Campion.
- Created by: Jerry Siegel

Publication information
- Publisher: Fleetway Publications
- Schedule: Weekly
- Title(s): Lion; 4 May to 26 October 1968; Lion Annual; 1970
- Formats: Original material for the series has been published as a strip in the comics anthology(s) Lion.
- Publication date: 4 May – 26 October 1968
- Main character(s): Gadgetman; Gimmick-Kid

Creative team
- Writer(s): Jerry Siegel
- Artist(s): Carvic (Note: A collective pseudonym for Carlos Pino and Vicente Alcazar.)

"Gadgetman and Gimmick-Kid" is a British comic strip published by Fleetway Publications in the boys' comic anthology title Lion between 4 May to 26 October 1968. Written by Superman co-creator Jerry Siegel, it tells the adventures of a pair of American crime-fighting technical geniuses - Gadgetman and his younger sidekick Gimmick Kid - as they battle a variety of outlandish villains.

== Creation ==
Despite the ongoing success of Superman in the 1960s, the character's creators Jerry Siegel and Joe Shuster received little financial return for the character. The pair made two unsuccessful attempts to sue DC Comics over ownership of the character; after learning of the preparation of the second in 1966, DC stopped giving the pair work. After a time with Archie Comics, Siegel approached various publishers around the world looking for work.

Siegel contacted British publisher Fleetway Publications in 1965, and took over writing the adventures of super-criminal The Spider in the pages of Lion from Ted Cowan in January 1966. "The Spider" was one of the strips commissioned by Lion assistant editor Geoff Kemp in response to imports of American Silver Age superhero comics, particularly the Marvel and DC reprints of rival Odhams Press' Power Comics line. Siegel refashioned the Spider into an anti-hero, battling a succession of larger-than-life villains.

In response to this success, Siegel was asked to create an even more overtly American strip at a time when few such characters were being created for British comics. Gadgetman and Gimmick-Kid was strongly influenced by Batman, particularly the ABC television series (which had started airing in the UK on ITV on 21 May 1966). Art for the weekly strip was provided by Carlos Pino and Vicente Alcazar (who at the time worked jointly under the pseudonym Carvic), who were among the large number of Spanish artists used by Fleetway and its predecessor Amalgamated Press. Among the pair's previous British work were issues of War Picture Library and City Magazines' licensed Star Trek strip in TV Century 21.

== Publishing history ==
The strip featured on several Lion covers, drawn by Geoff Campion. In line with then-current Fleetway policy - which assigned no ownership or royalties, instead offering sizeable page rates under a work-for-hire model - neither Siegel nor the artists were credited in Lion. The strip would ultimately be short-lived, lasting six months before being dropped after the 26 October 1968 issue of Lion. While no hard information on the strip's popularity is known, the composition of Fleetway's anthologies was dictated by simple audience research - top three lists of reader's favourites were compiled from correspondence, with strips that performed poorly dropped. Siegel would continue to write "The Spider" for Lion until February 1969, while "Gadgetman and Gimmick-Kid" would make one final appearance in the 1970 Lion Annual.

Several Fleetway stories of the time were syndicated for overseas publication. In 1976, Adventures and Voyages reprinted "Gadgetman and Gimmick-Kid" in the first four issues of French anthology Atemi, renamed to simply "Gadgetman". Since 2018, Lion and its contents have been owned by Rebellion Developments.

== Plot summary ==
A genius inventor, Burt Travis uses his skills to build the successful Travis Corporation before putting his skills to fighting crime. He is aided by another brilliant mind, young Travis Corporation scientist Gary Stewart after the youngster helps foil a raid on a laboratory by the Madmen Mob. They hide their true identities they don colourful costumes and become known as Gadgetman and Gimmick-Kid, making a secret hideout in a fake iceberg. Among their arsenal are the heavily armed flying car known as the Gadgetcraft and ray-guns, both of which project a bewildering array of munitions, as well as robot-servants to build any device the pair can conceive. Their reputation is enough to cause a fleet of alien ships to turn around without even trying to invade Earth.

Not that the pair are without enemies. Against them are the joker known as the Trickster, his huge robot the Taunting Titan and his cranially enhanced army of Brain-Men; King Zombie; the Mad Mummy; alien invader Zeroc; and Gimmick-Kid's idiot cousin Ramsey Chillingswaithe, who briefly attempted an unsuccessful superhero career as Zoom-Boy before rebranding as villain Doom-Boy and recruiting female sidekick Doom-Girl as part of a convoluted plan to infiltrate The Terror League.

== Reception ==
In the January 1969 edition of their journal New University, the Association for Programmed Learning and Educational Technology cited "Gadgetman and Gimmick-Kid" as a prime example of the low literacy quality of British comics, naming it as a prime example of a story which had "almost discarded any plot in favour of continuous violence, with assault and retaliation following each other until the quota of panels has been filled". Conversely, Lew Stringer would describe the strip as "completely daft" but nevertheless felt "there's something very likeable about it".
