= Black Max =

British comic book story

- Black Max and one of his giant bats, art by Alfonso Font.

Character information
- First appearance: Thunder (17 October 1970)
- Created by: Ken Mennell; Frank S. Pepper; Eric Bradbury

In-story information
- Full name: Baron Maximilien von Klor
- Species: Human mutant
- Place of origin: Earth
- Team affiliations: Luftstreitkräfte
- Partnerships: Doktor Gratz; Morg; King-Bats; Bat-People
- Notable aliases: The Bat Master
- Abilities: Telepathy

Publication information
- Publisher: IPC Magazines; Rebellion Developments
- Schedule: Weekly
Title(s)
Thunder
17 October 1970 to 13 March 1971
Lion
20 March 1971 to 21 October 1972
Lion and Thunder Special
1971-1973
Thunder Annual
1972-1973
- Formats: Original material for the series has been published as a strip in the comics anthology(s) Thunder; Lion.
- Publication date: 17 October 1970 – 21 October 1972
- Main character(s): Black Max; Tim Wilson; Morg; Major "Groucher" Grommett; Doktor Gratz

Creative team
- Writer(s): Ken Mennell; Frank S. Pepper
- Artist(s): Eric Bradbury; Alfonso Font

Reprints
- Collected editions
- Black Max Volume One: ISBN 9781781086551
- Black Max Volume Two: ISBN 9781781088623

Black Max is a British comic character who has appeared in eponymous strips published by IPC Magazines and Rebellion Developments. The character, a German World War I fighter pilot with telepathic control over gigantic bats, first appeared in the launch issue of IPC weekly comic Thunder on 17 October 1970. The comic only lasted for 22 issues before merging with Lion; "Black Max" survived the transfer, and would continue until 21 October 1972; it was replaced by a spin-off strip called "Secrets of the Demon Dwarf", focusing on supporting character Doktor Gratz. Since 2018, the character has returned in new material published by Rebellion Developments.

== Creation ==
After Fleetway Publications were reorganised into IPC Magazines the new management launched several new titles in the early 1970s. One of these was the boys' action comic Thunder. "The Black Max" was among the new strips devised, created by veterans Ken Mennell and Frank S. Pepper. The design was created by another long-serving staff member, artist Eric Bradbury, who created a three-page introductory serial for the dummy version of Thunder, which would be reused for the first issue of the weekly. While Mennell would write the initial batch of strips, Bradbury was unable to fit it into his schedule. Instead IPC looked to Spain for a regular artist (a practice that had already seen the work of the likes of Jesús Blasco and Francisco Solano López become a familiar sight to British readers). Jorge Macabich of the Barcelona-based Bardon Art agency offered the work to young artist Alfonso Font, who was fascinated by World War I aerial combat and swiftly agreed. Font bought scale models of the Sopwith Camel and Fokker Dr.I as reference. Like many of the artists who worked on Fleetway and IPC stories, he never met the strip's writers or editors, and would later feel not meeting Pepper was his one regret regarding his work on "Black Max".

== Publishing history ==
Thunder launched on 17 October 1970, with "Black Max" among the line-up; the third issue of the comic offered "Black Max's bat" (i.e. a cardboard bat) as a free gift, but the title was cancelled after just 22 issues, to be merged with the long-running Lion. The merger was considered unusual, as six of the 11 Thunder features (including "Black Max") migrated to what was now called Lion and Thunder from 20 March 1972. To bring readers new to the character up to speed, the first strips in Lion retold the events of the Thunder stories. "The Black Max" ended as a regular strip following the 21 October 1972 edition of the comic; it was replaced by "The Secrets of the Demon Dwarf" featuring the Black Max's occasional ally and rival, Doktor Gratz. One-off "Black Max" strips would feature in the 1972 Lion and Thunder Holiday Special and the 1974 Thunder Annual, while some of the weekly serials would be reprinted in the 1977 Lion Annual, the 1980 Lion Special and the same year's Valiant Annual.

Following Rebellion Developments' purchase of the IPC Youth Group (consisting of IPC and Fleetway Publications' post-1970 library, which included "Black Max") in 2016, the first of a series of collected editions of "Black Max" was announced in 2018, under the Treasury of British Comics imprint. The second volume followed in 2020, featured a cover by artist Chris Weston and an exclusive webshop cover by Ian Kennedy. Weston had previously drawn the character for fan commissions.

The character was also revived for the Scream! & Misty 2018 Halloween Special one-shot, at the suggestion of Rebellion editor Keith Richardson. Richardson and writer Kek-W _{(sic)} attempted to find a balance between respecting the original's "old-school craziness" while updating the character for modern appearances. Simon Coleby drew the new story. In 2019, Ian Edginton and Tiernen Trevallion featured the Black Max in their 2000 AD story "Fiends of the Eastern Front", with the character appearing on the cover of Prog 2112.

== Plot summary ==
Recuperating from injuries suffered at the hands of the Royal Flying Corps, German pilot Baron Maximilien von Klor returns to the Western Front to take over command of a fighter squadron. Known as Black Max due to his distinctive black Fokker Dr.I triplane, the Baron is obsessed with making the RFC pay for his wounds, and returns to his ancestral castle to collect a huge bat that follows his commands. With the help of his lumbering assistant Morg he keeps the bat a secret - flying at dawn and dusk while keeping the creature in a nearby cavern. The aircraft-sized bat soon causes heavy losses to the RFC squadron, including the Sopwith Camels of the newly deployed 14th RFC Pursuit Squadron. Among their number is former circus performer Tim Wilson, who witnesses one of the bat's kills. However, squadron commander Major "Groucher" Gromett refuses to believe his story, and Wilson is grounded. He goes to further lengths to expose the secret of Black Max, who in turn attempts to silence Wilson. Both parties become more desperate, with the Black Max willing to kill his own men to hide the truth, and Wilson's obsession landing him in disciplinary trouble. Gromett sees the bat but receives a head injury moments later, losing his memory and being invalided home; the new C.O. is no easier to convince. However, a fellow pilot is finally able to corroborate the existence of the bat; with the truth out the Black Max withdraws from the front line and Wilson is hailed as a hero.

However, the Count is unbowed and returns to his castle. There he works with his grandfather to control a large number of the giant bats, which he calls the Devil Squadron, and returns to battle the RFC and Wilson - who has become an ace and been promoted to lieutenant, and has taken a young pilot called Mike Shaw under his wing - once again. Black Max uses a giant Zeppelin as a mobile base for the Devil Squadron, until it is destroyed by Wilson and Shaw. However, Black Max and many of the bats survive the explosion.

Gromett returned to take command of the squadron, while Black Max's bats continued to exact a toll on the RFC, initially from a mobile base until Wilson and Groucher were able to destroy it. Among those killed by the Devil Squadron was the younger brother of decorated ace Colonel 'Hero' Hall of 12 Squadron, who became obsessed with seeking revenge and had to be saved by Wilson. Frustrated at his defeats, Black Max instead captured and brainwashed RFC recruit Tim Crane in an attempt to trap 14 Squadron, though Wilson was able to save most of his fellow pilots. The German then changed tack, using the Zeppelin L3 to begin launching his giant bats over the skies of London. While Wilson and his comrades were assigned to Home Defence and drove off the raiders, though Wilson's sense of honour prevented him from killing a helpless Black Max. The Count then located a serum to greatly increase the size of his bats, left by his 'Bat-People' antecedents. The resulting King-Bat provided hard to control but terrorised British forces along the Western front until Wilson and Gromett were able to trick it into crashing into a fuel convoy.

Black Max found a similarly twisted ally in the form of the so-called 'Demon Dwarf, the brilliant but evil scientist Doktor Gratz. He devised an drilling machine which would allow Black Max's bats to be used to hold down the strategically crucial Castle Hill - where Gratz was also searching for hidden treasure. The pair eventually turned on each other, allowing British forces to persevere. Von Klor's grandfather was able rediscover the formula for the potion to create a cauldron of King-Bats, and sets his eyes on capturing an experimental Royal Navy battleship, but Tim was able to save the vessel - and capture Black Max. The Count was saved by King-Bats sent by his grandfather and again teamed up with Gratz. They discovered a lost colony of the vicious ancient Bat-People and unleashed them on the British, but instead they turned on the King-Bats. The pair then laid low until the Black Max's distinctive triplane reappeared over the Western front, and was seemingly shot down. Wilson refused to believe his old enemy had died and was proved right when von Klor and Gratz targeted Paris from a French Château. He was eventually able to persuade Grommet of the danger, while the avaricious villains fell out once again. Black Max is seemingly finally destroyed by artillery shelling, but Gratz escapes. Nevertheless, Black Max survived and once again raised a King-Bat in an unsuccessful attempt to kill Tim Wilson in 1916, followed by another in 1917. Doktor Gratz meanwhile cryogenically froze himself, intending only to be in suspended animation for a few months but instead reawakening in 1972. Furious at discovering Germany's defeat in World War I, he uses his scientific knowledge to make the rest of the world pay. He is opposed by RAF Squadron Leader Bill Wilson, who remembers his grandfather's struggles with Gratz.

== Collected editions ==
Title	ISBN	Publisher	Release date	Contents
Black Max Volume One	9781781086551	Rebellion Developments	4 October 2018	Material from Thunder 17 October 1970 to 13 March 1971, Lion March 20 to 8 May 1971, Lion and Thunder Special 1971 and Thunder Annual 1972
Black Max Volume Two	9781781088623	Rebellion Developments	14 October 2021	Material from Lion May 15 to 25 December 1971 and Thunder Annual 1973
Black Max Volume Three	9781837861026	Rebellion Developments	18 January 2024	Material from Lion January 01 to 21 October 1972 and Thunder Annual 1974

== Reception ==
Rachel Bellwoar of Comicon.com was excited by the series' republication, surmising "If the idea of bats fighting WWI make you smile, you're probably the right audience for Black Max". Rebellion editor Keith Richardson described "Black Max" as " the standout strip in Thunder"

Reviewing the first collection for Slings & Arrows, Karl Verhoven likened the story to a Hammer horror, saying it "can't be taken remotely seriously, but in the right frame of mind it's enjoyable claptrap, brilliantly drawn" and felt much the same about the second, criticising the episodes' formulaic events but praising Font's art.
