= Edward Cowan =

Edward Cowan may refer to:

- Ed Cowan (born 1982), Australian Test cricketer
- Edward J. Cowan, Scottish historian
- Ted Cowan, British comic book writer
