= Thunder (British comics) =

British weekly comic

- The cover of Thunder from 21 November 1970.

Publication information
- Publisher: IPC/Fleetway Publications, 1970-1971
- Schedule: Weekly
- Format: Ongoing series
- Genre: Action/adventure
- Publication date: 17 October 1970 – 13 March 1971
- No. of issues: 22
- Main character(s): Adam Eterno; Black Max; Cliff Hanger; Fury's Family; Gauntlet of Fate; The Spooks of St. Lukes; Steel Commando

Creative team
- Written by: Ken Mennell; Frank S. Pepper; Tom Tully
- Artist(s): Eric Bradbury; Mario Capaldi; Alfonso Font; Alex Henderson; Tom Kerr; Joseph Lee; Francisco Solano López; Reg Parlett; Mike Western
- Editor: Jack Le Grand

Thunder was a weekly British comics periodical published by Fleetway Publications from 17 October 1970 to 13 March 1971. A boys' adventure comic, the title only lasted for 22 editions before being merged with another Fleetway title, the long-established Lion.

== Publishing history ==
On 1 January 1969 International Publishing Corporation (IPC) merged Fleetway Publications and Odhams Press into a single division, IPC Magazines. This left them in charge of a large number of weekly comics aimed at younger readers, including seasoned titles such as Eagle, Lion and Valiant. The new company swiftly launched a spate of new titles - girls' comic Sally in June 1969; humour title Whizzer and Chips in October 1969; and the sports-themed Scorcher in January 1970. Thunder was IPC Magazines' first attempt at a new boys' adventure weekly, and the experienced Jack Le Grand was assigned to assemble the new title. The title cost 8d, twice the cost of competitor DC Thomson's The Beano at the time.

In common with most new British comics of the time, initial issues featured a cover-mounted free gift - the first featured an 'Amazing Jumping Kangaroo' that tied into strip "Fury's Family", which British comics expert John Freeman would later regard as "the daftest free gift we’ve ever seen to be used to launch a boys’ adventure comic", while the second - featuring art by Mike Western - promised readers 'Black Max's bat' (actually a cardboard bat). Freeman would later recall being unimpressed with the early covers of Thunder, which soon switched to fore-fronting the educational "Famous Firsts".

The 20 February edition announced a trio of new strips - "Dr. Mesmer's Revenge", "The Mighty Ones" and "The Jigsaw Journey" - would be arriving in Thunder soon. However, three issues later the comic abruptly informed readers it would be merged into Lion after 22 issues. While merging titles was common practice at Fleetway, the combining of Lion and Thunder was unusual. Firstly, normally the subsumed title's name would quietly disappear from the pages of the comic after a few weeks; however, Lion would retain the title of Lion and Thunder until it itself was merged into Valiant in 1974. Secondly, inside the first merged Lion and Thunder on 20 March 1971 six of the 11 features were continued from Thunder rather than Lion, and many would stay until the title folded, while the trio of announced strips would also appear in Lion and Thunder. Despite the demise of the weekly comic, IPC issued Thunder Annuals for 1972, 1973 and 1974.

Thunder was one of several 1970s Fleetway/IPC titles cancelled after 22 issues (as were Jet, Tornado and Starlord); long-serving editor Barrie Tomlinson stated that with the technology of the time it took 22 weeks for meaningful sales trends to emerge and for crude market research on the title to be analysed. The method was known within the company as "hatch, match and dispatch", and was instigated by managing editor John Sanders. New titles with fresh strips would be "hatched", features would be "matched" with the audience and then the comic would be cancelled and its popular features would be "dispatched" to another of the company's weeklies. The popularity of features was largely based on readers' letters; across the company's titles children were encouraged to write in with their top three favourite features of each anthology; those that scored well from new titles would be retained and those that did not were dropped. Strips that scored well from new titles continued after the incorporation with another comic, replacing that publication's underperformers. The subsequent merged publication would typically then receive a considerable boost in sales. Sanders has defended this model, citing the cost of around £30,000 to launch a new title as proof they were not designed to fail, pointing to the commercial success of the process and noting staff were never sacked or penalised for a failed title but simply moved to other comics in the company.

In 2016 Thunder was among the titles purchased from Egmont Group by Rebellion Developments, who have since reprinted some material from the title in their Treasury of British Comics collected editions.

== Stories ==
Due to its short length, Thunder had a consistent run of strips. Only one started after the first issue.

=== Adam Eterno ===
Writer: Tom Tully
Artists: Tom Kerr, Francisco Solano López

After quaffing the Elixir of Life, Adam Eterno is doomed to immortality and drifts through time trying to find a solid gold weapon that can kill him.

- Created by Jack Le Grand and Chris Lowder. It was continued in Lion and then Valiant until 1976.

=== Black Max ===
Writer: Ken Mennell, Frank S. Pepper
Artists: Eric Bradbury, Alfonso Font

Baron Maximilien Von Klorr is Germany's most fearsome ace pilot of World War I - partly due to being helped by a gigantic bats. With his Fokker Dr.I painted black, he soon earns the nickname Black Max. His opposition comes from the Royal Flying Corps, particularly plucky Lieutenant Tim Wilson.

- The character was created by Ken Mennell, Frank S. Pepper and Eric Bradbury. Alfonso Font later took over from Bradbury on art duties.

=== Cliff Hanger ===
Adventurer Cliff Hanger and his Gurkha batman Kukri battle fiends in South America.

- The strip featured an interactive element, similar to Lion's "Spot the Clue with Zip Nolan" - each end-of-instalment cliffhanger featured an element to get Cliff and Kukri out of danger, which readers were encouraged to try and work out in the week between issues. The strip was not continued after the merger with Lion, where Zip Nolan continued.

=== Dusty Binns ===
Artist: Geoff Campion, Alfonso Font

Son of a rag-and-bone man, Plantagenet "Dusty" Binns must balance helping his father with his business and his calling as a talented footballer.

- The story was not continued in Lion, which retained the football strip Carson's Cubs.

=== Famous Firsts ===
- A one-page historical colour strip on the front cover, relating tales of pioneering developments and other notable events. It was due to be replaced with "The Mighty Ones", a similar factual item, which was instead ran in Lion.

=== Fury's Family ===
Young boy Fury works at a circus and discovers he can talk to animals. As a result, he is able to lead an escape from tyrannical new circus owner Archer Spang, with the likes of Bengal tiger Khan, gorilla Chang, chimpanzees Petto and Tikka and kangaroo Ozzie joining him on the run.

- The story was continued in Lion until 1972.

=== Gauntlet of Fate ===
A medieval gauntlet is still haunted by the fearsome Judge Flint gives whoever wears it superhuman strength and invulnerability, and is discovered by ne'er-do-well Tom Stokes.

- The strip was due to be replaced by "Dr. Mesmer's Revenge" before the merger, and was not continued in Lion.

This strip was particularly popular in Sweden, where new stories were produced by creators such as Claes Reimerthi and Dai Darell from 1983 to 1993.

=== The Jet Skaters ===
The Gang - Andy Jackson, Gordon Stone and brothers Jimmy and Peter Clarke - are gifted rocket boots by Andy's American uncle, use the technology to help around town.

- The story continued in Lion until later in 1971.

=== Phil the Fluter ===
Artist: Mike Western

Phil Taylor finds a tin flute in the ruins of his local abbey, and discovers he can freeze time when he plays it.

- A colour strip; when Phil stopped time everyone bar him would switch to black-and-white. Continued in Lion until 1972.

=== Sam ===
Cunning troublemaker Sam one-ups passing unfortunates with a mixture of quick thinking and violence.

- A one-page colour humour strip on the back page, "Sam" was actually modified version of "Biff" from Wham, and featured work from Leo Baxendale and Graham Allen. Sam acted as a mascot for Thunder, and continued in this role for Lion and Thunder.

=== The Spooks of St. Luke's ===
Artist: Joseph Lee

Amiable ghosts at a school work with the pupils to terrorise the school's teachers.

- A one-page comedy strip, with some episodes drawn by which was continued in Lion.

=== Steel Commando ===
In World War II, Professor Brayne devises the Mark 1 Indestructible Robot for the British Army. Unfortunately a programming error means the fearsome war machine will only respond to the voice of Lance corporal Ernest "Excused Boots" Bates, a Cockney layabout. Nevertheless, the pair are sent into combat in France with successful results - at least whenever Bates feels like ordering 'Ironsides' into battle.

- Created by Frank S. Pepper and Alex Henderson, the story also continued in Lion and then Valiant, where the Steel Commando teamed up with Captain Hurricane.

=== The Terrible Trail to Tolmec ===
Tom Taylor's father is missing, presumed dead in the jungles of South America, when the boy discovers a coded map among his effects. With the help of explorer Dr. Wolfgang Stranger he sets out to find him.

- A sequel serial, "The Jigsaw Journey", was printed in Lion.
