= Cursitor Doom =

British comic book character

- Cursitor Doom from the pages of Smash!, art by Eric Bradbury

Publication information
- Publisher: IPC Magazines/Fleetway Publications; Rebellion Developments
- First appearance: Smash!, 15 March 1969
- Created by: Ken Mennell

In-story information
- Species: Human
- Place of origin: Earth
- Partnerships: Scarab; Angus McCraggan
- Abilities: Psychic; Telepathic

Cursitor Doom is a fictional British comic book character who debuted in a self-titled comic strip in the 15 March 1969 issue of the anthology Smash!, published by IPC Magazines. Created by Ken Mennell, Cursitor Doom is a powerful mystic who protects Earth from supernatural threats.

== Creation ==
Odhams Press had been the original publisher of Smash! as one of their short-lived line of Power Comics, an ambitious series of British weekly comics that had briefly prospered and then crashed due to a flooded market and an over-reliance on Marvel and DC Comics reprints. The latter, stripped of their colour and otherwise edited to fit the format of an anthology serial (seeing the 18-page American issues split up into episodes of around six pages), failed to find a lasting audience, and were further compromised by the devaluation of the pound making the once-cheap American licences prohibitively expensive. Odhams were taken over by IPC, putting them under the same umbrella as rivals Fleetway. With the Power Comics collapsing in a series of mergers until Smash! was the sole survivor, the decision was made to turn the comic into a more traditional boys' comic in the Fleetway mould. As such, Smash! received a number of stories intended for a planned horror anthology called Blackjack which IPC management had vetoed, with "Cursitor Doom" among them.

== Publication history ==
The 15 March 1969 issue introduced "Cursitor Doom", "The Incredible Adventures of Janus Stark", "His Sporting Lordship" and "Master of the Marsh" to the comic. Cursitor Doom was written by Ken Mennell, a long-standing editor with a reputation as the comics division's "ideas man", and drawn by veteran Eric Bradbury on the strength of his work on "Maxwell Hawke" in Buster. Initially Bradbury only drew the opening arc; Geoff Campion took over for the second before Bradbury returned to handle art duties for the remainder of the run. Scott Goodall and Chris Lowder later wrote the strip. However, sales of Smash! continued to fall, leading to a rapid turnover of strips as the editorial team tried to find a winning formula, and "Cursitor Doom" ended after 31 January 1970.

== Fictional character information ==
=== Plot ===
Demobbed British soldier Angus McCraggan answers an advertisement that leads him to the home of Cursitor Doom, a portentous mystic who claims to fight mystical things beyond the comprehension of men and lives with a raven called Scarab. He hires McCraggan as his driver and muscle. The pair are soon called into action when a London journalist called Sneed carelessly frees evil sorcerer Karnak the Dwarf from imprisonment and begins to work with the villain. Thanks to Cursitor Doom's encyclopaedic knowledge of the occult and McCraggan's bravery, Kalak was vanquished - though the investigator warned his assistant this was likely to be only the first sinister and mystic foe they faced.

Sure enough they were soon called in to investigate sightings of the ghost of highwayman Black Patch. Later the pair thwarted the return of the Snake-Mummy of Samotoya, saved South American president Velasquez from the influence of the ancient sorcerer Scorpio, Dominic Devine's attempts to release an unspeakable evil from the Door with Seven Locks, preventing a deranged cult from resurrecting the dark mage Mardarax, freed scientist Brice Talbot from sinister influences, and halted the maniacal rival sorcerer Attagory.

=== Powers and abilities ===
Cursitor Doom is a psychic and has some telepathic abilities, being able to detect McCraggan's thoughts from considerable distance when the latter was in distress. He has extensively studied magic and the occult; thus he can carry out various rituals and spells, and his vast working knowledge allows him to rapidly devise counters to his foes' powers.

== Revivals ==
The character was subsequently revived in by Quality Communications in 1986 after they signed a deal with Fleetway to handle repackaging material for the American market. In 1986 the "Cursitor Doom" stories themselves were modified and coloured for inclusion in Spellbinders, an anthology of supernatural stories that also included of "Sláine" and "Nemesis the Warlock" from 2000 AD. The character featured in a new framing sequence (drawn by Garry Leach) for coloured reprints of "The Steel Claw" from Valiant as an ally of Lewis Randell (Note: As Louis Crandell was renamed for the series). For these appearances the character was renamed Amadeus Wolf.

Another short-lived revival came in the 1992 2000 AD Action Special, which saw several classic British characters updated by 2000 AD creators. Cursitor Doom's strip was written by John Tomlinson with art by Jim Baikie. However, any chance of further new adventures were killed off when the 2000 AD staff belatedly discovered the pre-1970 IPC characters had been sold to Danish publisher Egmont Group. In 2006 the Egmont library was licensed to DC Comics, and the Albion mini-series was created by the DC subsidiary WildStorm. The comic combined numerous Amalgamated Press/Fleetway/IPC Magazines characters; Cursitor Doom's appearance was low-key but important as he spent most of the series unnamed and comatose before being revealed as the father of main protagonist Danny (based on the previously unconnected Valiant character Danny Doom) in the final issue.

When Rebellion Developments created their own classic character crossover The Vigilant in 2017, writer Simon Furman wanted to use the character due to his fond memories of the strip. However, he was unable to do so as the character was not among the post-1970 properties then owned by Rebellion. This was rectified in 2018 when the pre-1970 library was purchased by Rebellion, allowing Furman to feature Cursitor Doom in the "Doctor Sin" back-up strip in The Vigilant: Legacy. The character then appeared in the Smash! Special 2020 in an all-new strip by writer Maura McHugh and artist Andreas Butzbach, which featured Cursitor Doom teaming up with Valiant character Jason Hyde, something suggested by Rebellion editor Keith Richardson.

Doom and McCraggan made a cameo appearance in the last episode of 'Portals & Black Goo' in 2000 AD Prog 2347 where Doom's less successful brother is one of the protagonists. Cursitor Doom featured more prominently working with his brother in a second series starting in January 2025.

== Collected editions ==
To tie in with Albion, one of the original "Cursitor Doom" serials ("...and the Dark Legion of Mardarax", originally printed 4 October to 8 November 1969) was published in the companion hardcover Albion Origins in 2006. Three years later, Steve Holland licensed the complete original run as well as strips from two Smash! Annuals and a text story from the Smash! Holiday Special, published via his Bear Alley Books imprint and featuring a new colour cover by John Ridgway.

== Reception ==
Despite the relatively short run, the character was well-remembered. Comic historian Steve Holland has credited this to the "considerable style of Bradbury's art, and has also suggested the straight depiction of the supernatural in the series (compared to the likes of Maxwell Hawke, where ghosts were typically revealed to be illusions created by criminals) as a factor. Dave Gibbons, Steve MacManus and Lew Stringer have also praised the stories.
