= The Cat Girl (comics) =

British comic book story

- The Cat Girl on the cover of the 9 May 1970 edition of Sally, art by Giorgio Giorgetti.

Character information
- First appearance: Sally (14 June 1969)

In-story information
- Alter ego: Cathy Carter
- Species: Human
- Place of origin: Earth
- Abilities: Increased agility, speed and sight via magical suit

Publication information
- Publisher: Fleetway Publications; IPC Magazines
- Schedule: Weekly
- Title(s): Sally; 14 June 1969 to 27 March 1971; Tammy; 3 April to 4 September 1971
- Formats: Original material for the series has been published as a strip in the comics anthology(s) Sally.
- Genre: Crime

Creative team
- Artist(s): Giorgio Giorgetti

The Cat Girl is a British comic character who has appeared in eponymous strips published by IPC Magazines and Rebellion Developments. The character, a girl called Cathy Carter who finds a suit that gives her the attributes of a cat and becomes a crimefighter, first appeared in the launch issue of weekly girls' comic Sally on 14 June 1969.

== Creation ==
In 1969 Fleetway Publications and Odhams Press had been merged to form IPC Magazines under the ownership of the Mirror Group and Reed International. The company's sheaf of successful juvenile titles were a major attraction, and thus IPC would launch a succession of new comics with newly appointed managing editor John Sanders charged with devising them. The first of these was the girls' weekly Sally in June 1969. Compared to many other girls' titles covering "struggling orphans, wandering waifs, and fish-out-of-water stories", the new title featured an unusual amount of adventure strips, including "Legion of the Super-Slaves", "Tiny Tania in Space", "The Girl from Tomorrow", "The Justice of Justine" and "The Cat Girl". "The Cat Girl" was drawn by Giorgio Giorgetti, an artist born in Italy who had been running a studio in Margate since 1950, and had worked on numerous British comics including Eagle and June.

== Publishing history ==
Sally was published until 27 March 1971, before merging with Tammy. It has been speculated that, as a newer title, Sally suffered disproportionately from a printer's dispute that meant no new issues of most IPC titles were released between 14 November 1970 and 30 January 1971. The merger was unusual as Tammy had only been launched the previous month; IPC mergers typically saw the longer-running title retained and the newer comic incorporated. "The Cat Girl" survived the merger, and would run in Tammy until September 1971.

Cat Girl's adventures were also translated and printed in mainland Europe. In the long-running Dutch comic Tina, the strip was renamed "Katja Kruif – Het Katmeisje" and ran until #26; these pages were colourised. In Spain the strips were compiled as Caty – La Chica Gato by Editorial Bruguera. Cat Girl made a brief cameo in the 2000 AD serial "Zenith" in 1989, but was swiftly killed off alongside Buster characters The Leopard from Lime Street and Fishboy by the Lloigor-possessed Mr Why.

As the character's adventures started before 1 January 1970, the Cat Girl was among the properties retained by IPC their library of titles still in publication was sold off to Pergamon Holdings in the early 1990s. In 2018 this library was purchased by Rebellion Developments. This allowed the character to make a brief cameo in Rebellion's The Vigilant series, where Cat Girl was shown as a member of an earlier deceased version of the eponymous team. A new strip was created for Rebellion's 2020 Tammy and Jinty Special; written by Ramzee with art by Elkys Nova, "Cat Girl Returns" depicted Cathy's daughter Claire discovering the costume and taking up the mantle. In August 2020, Rebellion issued the compendium The Best of Cat Girl as part of the Treasury of British Comics, collecting two of the serials from Sally, a story from the 1971 Sally Annual and the 2020 revival strip, with a new cover by Nova. A hardcover version using Giorgetti's art for the cover was also released, exclusive to the Treasury of British Comics website.

== Plot summary ==
The daughter of a widowed and absent-minded private eye, Cathy Carter is observing him at work from their attic when she discovers a cat costume in a casket sent to her father from Africa by a grateful witch doctor. On a whim, she tries it on and suddenly finds she can leap incredible distances with perfect balance. As such, she is able to save her father from a vicious beating from the thugs of crime kingpin, the Eagle while avoiding discovery. She subsequently aids her unwitting father against his enemies, finding she is also able to see in the dark and navigate at night with ease - while also finding the magic suit's abilities were not all positive, as it caused her to panic in water and develop a ravenous appetite for fish. Cathy helps her father foil the Eagle's attempts to steal priceless jewellery from Lady Harrison and rob a train, escape from kidnapping by Kabari sheikh Kaspar, foil evil scientist Professor Von Kapp and his robot Hermann and Christmas gift thief the Duke (actually a bitter young boy called Joe) in the Swiss ski resort of St. Dorrinz, and helping actress Tootie Duval find her missing son Mark in Venice, discovering hidden gems in the Grand Theatre during a production of Dick Whittington and His Cat while foiling an attempt by bratty actress Angela Cook to steal her suit - on each occasion hiding the extent of her help from her oblivious dad so he can take the credit.

== Collected edition ==
Title	ISBN	Publisher	Release date	Contents
The Best of Cat Girl	9780785110798	Rebellion Developments	4 August 2022	Material from Sally June 14 to September 13, 1969; January 24 to May 30, 1970; Sally Annual 1971 and Tammy & Jinty 2020 Special.

== Reception ==
British comics expert and professional John Freeman is a fan of the character and called for "The Cat Girl" to be collected in 2020, noting that the strip prefigured "The Leopard from Lime Street" - something also noted by Lew Stringer. The character has also been compared to the Golden Age character Miss Fury and DC Thomson girls' comics "The Laughing Cats" and "Catch the Cat!", which also featured young heroines in cat costumes. Reviewing a post-merger issue of Tammy and Sally, A Resource on Jinty considered the strip "light relief against the grimness of the Tammy stories that focus on cruelty and misery".

Reviewing The Best of Cat Girl for ComicScene, Martin Dallard fondly recalled reading "The Cat Girl" in his sister's comics, and praised Giorgetti's "quirky" art. Girls Comics of Yesterday also praised the collection.
