= The 10,000 Disasters of Dort =

British comic book story

- The cover to the 7 September 1968 edition of Lion, featuring Ratta and Mike Dauntless
- Publisher: Fleetway Publications
- Publication date: 18 May – November 23 1968
- Genre: Science fiction
- Title(s): Lion 18 May to 23 November 23 1968
- Main character(s): Mike Dauntless; Gaston; Ratta

Creative team
- Writer(s): Mike Butterworth
- Artist(s): Luis Bermejo; José Ortiz
- Editor(s): Geoff Kemp
- 'Collected edition': ISBN 9781786189493

"The 10,000 Disasters of Dort" is a British comic strip published in the weekly anthology Lion from 18 May to 23 November 23 1968, published by Fleetway Publications. Written by Mike Butterworth and drawn by Spanish artists Luis Bermejo and José Ortiz, it concerns a terror campaign against Earth by aliens from the fictional doomed planet Dort, who hope to force humanity into sharing their home.

== Publication history ==
The story was originally serialised in 28 two-page weekly black-and-white episodes in Lion from 18 May to 23 November 23 1968; during this run "The 10,000 Disasters of Dort" was featured three times on the comic's front cover. The following year, an additional strip featured in the 1970 edition of Lion Annual. (Note: Annuals of the time were issued in the autumn of the year before that listed on the cover, in time for the Christmas gift-buying market and dated to make it easier for unsold stock to be sold afterwards) The story was reprinted in Lion itself between 22 December 1973 and 18 May 1974 (twice being featured on the cover), appearing in the title's final issue before it was merged with Valiant. As a result, the final two episodes were redrawn substantially to allow the story to conclude; those behind the new material have yet to be identified.

In May 2023, the serial was selected for collection in Rebellion Developments' Treasury of British Comics series of trade paperbacks. The original serial, the two annual stories and the modified conclusion of the reprint were all included in the book, which featured a brand new cover by artist Staz Johnson, as well as a factual article from the 1971 Lion Annual and a preview of the upcoming The Spider's Syndicate of Crime versus the Crook from Outer Space collection. To promote the book an eight-page preview - comprising the first four episodes - was printed in Judge Dredd Megazine #456.

== Plot summary ==
On 18 March 2000 the liner RMS Royalty arrives in New York City only to find the city completely destroyed; half an hour later the ship itself is lost when it simply collapses. Samples taken from the city are transported to the Cambridge laboratory of Professor Mike Dauntless; three days of study later, he finds the atomic structure of all metal within fifty miles of New York has been altered to the consistency of rubber by an unknown technology. The following day a huge hexagonal structure appears on a holl near Moscow, and projects the giant form of Ratta, dictator of the planet Dort. Scientists from Dory have discovered that by 2050 their planet will collide with its sun. As a result, Ratta has targeted Earth as a new home for his people and plans to unleash ten thousand disasters to hammer the human race into submission, of which the New York attack was just the first.

While the Council of World Governments gathers 48 hours later, few take Ratta's threats seriously - much to Dauntless' irritation. As a result, Ratta unleashes giant weeds that destroy most of Paris. Dauntless investigates by helicopter and rescues a young orphan called Gaston. The pair crash and have to fight their way out of Paris, where law has broken down among the survivors. Ratta announces a third disaster, and Melbourne is overran when he enlarges the city's population of zoo animals. Dauntless flies to Australia on Concorde to investigate, with Gaston stowing away too. Despite a huge eagle destroying their plane, the pair land and Dauntless has a super-sized housefly captured for study. While they work, the relentless Ratta unleashes a fourth disaster, chemically altering all the tea in England so it induces rage in those who drink it, reducing the country to anarchy. Dauntless is able to come up with a serum to return the animals threatening Australia to their normal size but is caught up in the chaos returning to London, and quickly realising the victims need to be anaesthetised while Britain's tea stock is destroyed.

For the fifth disaster, Ratta provides advanced weaponry to tribes of Jamali bandits who begin to advance through Egypt, and soon afterwards blots out all electricity on Earth before unleashing a new ice age for the sixth and seventh disasters. Enjoying the terror he has unleashed, Ratta travels to Earth to see the destruction for himself. Dauntless and Gaston meanwhile are trapped in Rome until they get a steam locomotive working, and soon come face to face with Ratta - who they find is human-sized. The alien plans to trap Dauntless in an iron maiden, but the scientist is able to talk Ratta into a game of chess to prove his superior intellect, with the removal of the sixth and seventh disasters as the stakes. Dauntless wins, and while infuriated Ratta keeps his word. Nevertheless the alien continues his campaign, with Germany receiving a plague of ants and then using a mirror to create an ultra-bright heatwave. Dauntless comes up with a way of stopping the radio signals controlling the ants, and he and Gaston pilot a spacecraft to destroy the orbital mirror, but is believed dead. In the meantime Ratta releases the tenth disaster, reducing 90% of the population to the mental state of beasts via tainted wheatgerm. Believing the humans to be all but defeated, Ratta orders the Dortian invasion fleet to launch. They land unopposed but Dauntless and Gaston have returned to Earth but are captured by the invaders. Just then news arrives that Dort's scientists have discovered the planet will not collide with its sun after all, and the attack on Earth is no longer necessary. Furious at his work being wasted, he attacks Dauntless but falls over a cliff to his death. With the dictator dead, the rest of the Dortians swiftly retreat.

Dauntless and Gaston continued to work together, aiding Government Security when an unnamed scientist unleashed a plague of mechanical locusts on London.

=== Alternate ending ===
In the reprinted version the story branches after the sixth and seventh disasters and Ratta's journey to Earth, when the latter battles Dauntless in single combat only to succumb to Earth germs, causing the invasion to be curtailed.

== Collected edition ==
Title	ISBN	Publisher	Release date	Contents
The 10,000 Disasters of Dort	9781786189493	Rebellion Developments	3 May 2023	Material from Lion 18 May to 23 November 1968 & 23 May 1974 and Lion Annual 1970 & 1971.

== Reception ==
Richard Bruton praised the story's "stunning artwork" and the "usual excellent reproduction" when previewing the collected edition for Comicon.com. While wryly noting that the series only delivered ten disasters before completion, John Freeman praised the series for its pace and spectacular visuals. Frank Plowright was less effusive for Slings and Arrows, feeling the story was more of a "curiosity" and criticising the hurried original ending, noting resolution and the title suggested a much longer run of the serial was planned.
