= Lion (comics) =

British weekly comic

- The cover of Lion from 2 April 1960, featuring Paddy Payne.

Publication information
- Publisher: Amalgamated Press (1952–1959); IPC / Fleetway Publications (1959–1974)
- Schedule: Weekly
- Format: Ongoing series
- Genre: Action/adventure
- Publication date: 23 February 1952 – 18 May 1974
- No. of issues: 1,156
- Main character(s): Captain Condor; Robot Archie; Paddy Payne; Karl the Viking; The Spider

Creative team
- Written by: Mike Butterworth, Ted Cowan, Frank S. Pepper, Jerry Siegel
- Artist(s): Reg Bunn, Geoff Campion, Joe Colquhoun, Don Lawrence, Brian Lewis
- Editor(s): Bernard Smith; George Beal; Geoff Kemp

Lion was a weekly British comics periodical published by Amalgamated Press (and later Fleetway Publications and IPC Magazines) from 23 February 1952 to 18 May 1974. A boys' adventure comic, Lion was originally designed to compete with Eagle, the popular weekly comic published by Hulton Press that had introduced Dan Dare. It debuted numerous memorable characters, including Captain Condor, Robot Archie, Paddy Payne and the Spider. Lion lasted for 1,156 issues before being merged with stablemate Valiant.

== Publication history ==
In 1952, Amalgamated Press (AP) editor Reg Eves ran an internal competition to come up with a competitor for the wildly successful Eagle. Bernard Smith, who had been with the company since 1922, won with the suggestion of Lion, and was rewarded with both a £5 prize and the role of editor of the new title. Smith had experience with boys' papers, having worked on AP's Young Britain and The Champion titles. Whereas those titles had featured text comics, Lion would mimic Eagle by switching to comic strips featuring speech bubbles rather than text captions. By using cheaper paper stock and fewer colour pages, AP hoped to undercut Eagle with Lion, which would be priced at 3d - a full penny cheaper than the Hulton title while matching its 24 pages. The cover proclaimed Lion to be "King of the Picture Story Pages". Like Eagle, most of the stories - bar the occasional humour strip - ran in weekly episodes of two to three pages.

AP identified Dan Dare as Eagle's biggest attraction. Despite having no interest in science fiction, Eves was under orders from management to have a space hero to compete with Dare, and commissioned Captain Condor from writer Frank S. Pepper as a direct rival. Initially drawn by Ron Forbes, Condor started out - in Pepper's words - as "a non-character" but gradually developed a following of his own, though never matching Dare's fame and popularity. Despite most of the characters being created on a work-for-hire basis, Pepper was allowed to retain ownership of Captain Condor. Other comic strips in the first issue were Barry Nelson's "Sandy Dean's First Term", the first of several serials featuring the titular schoolboy; World War II strip "The Lone Commandos" by Edward R. Home-Gall; Scotland Yard ace "Brett Marlow - Detective" in the first of several cases; and Ted Cowan and Ted Kearon's "The Jungle Robot", which introduced Robot Archie. This was rounded out by prose stories "Rod of the Trading Post", "Big Hank" and "Jingo Jones and His Invisibiliser", as well as factual pages - in this case features on sport in Ancient Rome, police reaction to 999 calls and unusual inventions - and enticements to enter a competition (prizes included bicycles, footballs and jack-knives) and join the 'Lion Club'. Readers letters were handled by Reg "Skipper" Clarke.

The first issue sold 900,000 copies before circulation settled to around 750,000. While failing to match Eagle's sales - which were typically around one million an issue - this was nevertheless a good figure for AP, and the comic would remain a strong seller for the rest of the decade. As the comic evolved strips came and went, though it retained a general mix of war, frontier era and science fiction strips. "The Jungle Robot" ended after six months before Robot Archie and his pals returned in 1957, and would run as one of Lion's star features until its final issue. 1957 also saw the debut of Paddy Payne, a World War II RAF pilot; drawn by Joe Colquhoun, Payne displaced Captain Condor from the cover for the first time and would remain a staple until 1969.

=== Lion and Sun ===
AP was acquired by IPC/Fleetway in 1959. Eves retired, while Smith guided Lion through the upheaval. This included a merger with Sun as part of the reorganisation; for several months the cover bore the title Lion and Sun before reverting to simply Lion. By the end of the fifties prose stories had disappeared in favour of either strip material of factual features. Popular additions over this period included stuntman Rory MacDuff and Norse saga "Karl the Viking", while Barrie Tomlinson joined the editorial staff in 1961. Several strips of the era would benefit from IPC's policy of moving towards cheaper artists based in Spain; this saw the likes of Alfonso Font, Víctor de la Fuente, Francisco Cueto and Jose Ortiz work on various Lion stories.

In 1962, Smith left the title to oversee Air Ace Library, before retiring. George Beal was appointed his replacement as editor, though he delegated most of the work to assistant Geoff Kemp. Recognising the growing foothold of imported American Silver Age comics on the British market - particularly rivals Odhams Press' line of Power Comics featuring Marvel reprints - Kemp responded by adding more fantastical strips to Lion. "The Amazing Jack Wonder" was short-lived, but more success was found by anti-heroes like "The Sludge" and "The Spider". The latter was created by Ted Cowan and featured artwork from Reg Bunn, covering the escapades of the eponymous arrogant criminal genius. The Spider's memorable status was sealed when Superman co-creator Jerry Siegel arrived looking for work and chose to write the character. Siegel would later also devise "Gadgetman and Gimmick Kid" for Lion.

=== Lion and Champion ===
IPC's short-lived revival of The Champion was folded into Lion in 1966; the influx from that title's roster included "The Phantom Viking", heavily indebted to Marvel's version of Norse deity Thor. The Champion merger also brought in a then-rare licensed story in the form of "Danger Man", featuring new adventures of Patrick McGoohan's television secret agent John Drake drawn by Jesús Blasco. Another new face was Electra Glide-riding Highway patrolman Zip Nolan. Initially introduced as a straightforward action strip in 1963, the following year it was revamped as "Spot the Clue with Zip Nolan", with readers encouraged to solve crimes by hints provided in the story - an idea previously used in a 1957 strip featuring detective Bruce Kent. Inevitably some mainstays had to make way for the new direction. In 1964 "Captain Condor" switched to reprinting earlier stories before being retired from the weekly two years later; Sandy Dean's adventures concluded in 1965, and in 1969 Paddy Payne stepped down from duty, having been dropped from the hallowed front page in favour of factual military feature Badges of the Brave. From early 1965 the cover switched to a splash illustration, rotated between various features. Spin-off titles included the hardback Lion Annuals (issued every autumn, ahead of the Christmas gift market), various specials and the Lion Picture Library series of digest-sized comics. Unlike the weekly, these featured self-contained stories, and would often feature characters that had been dropped from the weekly.

=== Lion and Eagle ===
1969 saw another merger, this time with Eagle. Throughout the Sixties, sales of Eagle had dwindled considerably as successive owners sought to cut costs; notably since 1967 Dan Dare had been switched to reprint status, and with its circulation dropping to an unsustainable 40,000 it was subsumed by the title created to rival it. As well as continued Dare reprints, the retitled Lion and Eagle brought in "The Waxer". The first Lion and Eagle also introduced "Turville's Touchstone"; retitled "Spellbinder" shortly into its run, the story would be one of the most popular Lion features over the next five years. IPC had merged IPC/Fleetway and Odhams into IPC Magazines in 1969, and a slew of new titles followed.

=== Lion and Thunder ===
Despite the reorganisation with a former rival causing some internal friction, Lion continued, and in 1971 absorbed young rival Thunder. The merger brought six new stories to Lion, some of which – such as "Adam Eterno", "Black Max" and "Sam" – would be mainstays, while the Lion and Thunder name would stick until cancellation. Between November 1970 and February 1971, no new issues were printed due to IPC being in dispute with their printers. Future Action and 2000 AD creator Pat Mills would produce some of his earliest work for Lion, creating "The Can-Do Kids" in 1971.

=== Valiant and Lion ===
The title soldiered on until 1974, when it was finally folded into Valiant from 25 May 1974 after 1,156 issues. This merger was not without controversy, with Lion's final assistant editor Chris Lowder ascribing it to internal politics. Lowder has stated it was outselling Valiant at the time, and that Jack Le Grand – responsible for launching Valiant and now managing director of Fleetway – ensured the comic he had helped devise survived. Lowder recalled he and Kemp took Le Grand to lunch to state their case, and were told they "just had to facking [sic] deal with it". The final line-up consisted of the doughty "Robot Archie, "Steel Commando", "Spellbinder", super-villain team-up "Masters of Menace", "Marty Wayne", "Sark the Sleeper", "The Team Terry Kept in a Box", "The Last of the Harkers", reprint "The 10,000 Disasters of Dort", "Adam Eterno", "Spot the Clue with Zip Nolan" and "Mowser". Only the latter trio would migrate to Valiant, while the Steel Commando would become a guest character in "Captain Hurricane". "Spellbinder" was instead allotted to the short-lived Valiant Book of Mystery and Magic, originally created as a Lion spin-off. As was common for cancelled IPC titles, the Lion Annual continued to be created for the lucrative Christmas market until 1983, albeit with an ever-increasing focus on reprints.

== Legacy ==
In 1991 the post-1970 libraries of IPC and Fleetway had been combined and sold to Egmont UK, being rebranded Fleetway Editions. The following year 2000 AD revived several classic characters for the 2000 AD Summer Special before belatedly realising they did not have the rights to most of them; IPC in fact retained ownership of the pre-1970 characters and stories (bar Dan Dare, who was sold off separately). In 2001 IPC were purchased by Time Inc., part of the TimeWarner group. This put the titles under the same umbrella as DC Comics, and allowed editor Andrew Sumner to interest the American publisher to produce new material based on the characters. As a result the 2005 limited series Albion featured sizeable roles for several former Lion characters. A short round of spin-offs and reprints followed before activity tailed off.

Having purchased the post-1970 library in 2016, Rebellion Developments were able to purchase the balance of the material in 2018, giving them rights to Lion and most of its contents. Selected Lion stories have since been collected as part of Rebellion's Treasury of British Comics series.

== Titles ==
- Lion 23 February 1952 to 17 October 1959
- Lion and Sun 24 October 1959 to 26 March 1960
- Lion 2 April 1960 to 4 June 1966
- Lion and Champion 11 June 1966 to 30 December 1967
- Lion 6 January 1968 to 27 April 1969
- Lion and Eagle 3 May 1969 to 31 January 1970
- Lion 7 February 1970 to 13 March 1971
- Lion and Thunder 20 March to 18 May 1974
- Valiant and Lion 25 May 1974 to 22 March 1975

== Spinoffs ==
- Lion Annual (30 issues, 1954 to 1983)
- Lion Book of War Adventures (1962)
- Lion Picture Library (136 issues, 1963 to 1969)
- Lion Book of Speed (1963)
- Lion Summer Spectacular (1967)
- Lion Summer Special (3 issues, 1968 to 1970)
- Lion and Valiant Special Extra (3 issues, 1968 to 1970)
- Lion Book of How It Works (1968)
- Lion Book of Great Conquerors (1970)
- Lion Book of Motor Racing (1970)
- Lion and Thunder Holiday Special (3 issues, 1971 to 1973)
- Lion Holiday Special (7 issues, 1974 to 1980)
