= The Champion (story paper) =

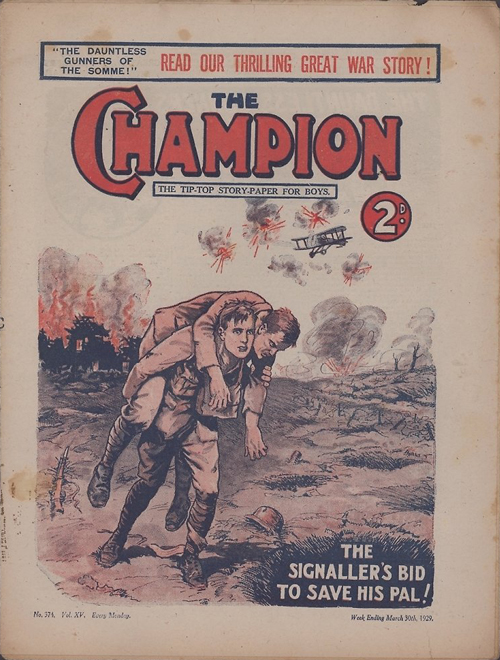
The Champion Vol XV issue 374, 1929.

The Champion was a British weekly boys' story paper published by Amalgamated Press, which ran from January 28, 1922, until March 19, 1955. Its original editor was Francis Addington Symonds. From 1929 until 1940 it had a monthly, pocket-sized companion paper, The Champion Library, containing characters from The Champion and its sister paper The Triumph. The Triumph eventually was merged into The Champion in 1942.

The title was revived as a comics magazine in 1966 for a short-lived publication which merged with Lion later that year.

== Characters ==
- Rockfist Rogan
- Clint Morgan - Hunter of Grey Mask
- Jet Jackson
- Ginger Nutt
- Colwyn Dane - Detective
- Kalgan - The Jungle Boxer
- Dixie Jim
- Johnny Fleetfoot - The Redskin Winger
- Kangaroo Kennedy
- Punch McPhee - The Fighting Sea-Cook
- Trapper Pete and his Racing Huskies
- Danny of the Dazzlers

== See also ==
- Ted Cowan
