= Ted Cowan =

British comic book writer

- Born: Edward George Cowan
- Died: Early 1970s
- Area: writer
- Pseudonyms: E. George Cowan; Edward G. Cowan; Denise Cowan (for the girl's story market); George Forrest; Geo. Forrest
- Notable works: Robot Archie; The Spider

Ted Cowan, being the best known familiar name of Edward George Cowan, was a British comic book writer.

His early career included working as a laboratory assistant prior to World War II when he enlisted firstly in the Royal Air Force and subsequently in the British Army where he was a dispatch rider. After the war he initially continued in the Services in a clerical capacity when he began to make the change to writing.

Having long been fascinated by the comics of the day, it was in response to a friendly challenge that he submitted a story for an amateur writing competition in a newspaper. Shortly afterwards he landed work for The Champion, writing the text story series about schoolboy Ginger Nutt. An increasing number of commissions prompted him to resign his regular job in order to turn professional as a freelance scriptwriter.

This was the start of nearly four decades of working in the British comic industry where at his peak he was considered among the most prolific writers of children's scripts in Fleet Street, London. He not only wrote for comics, but also annuals, "Libraries," and short stories for many publishers including Odhams Press, Fleetway Publications, IPC Media, and extensively in later years DC Thomson of Dundee, Scotland.

Undoubtedly his most famous creation was for Lion, for which he conceptualised Robot Archie (initially known as The Jungle Robot) which he would script for much of the strip's run. Archie, which first appeared in Lion's launch issue published on 23 February 1952, was 'operated' by the fictional Ted Richie and his best friend Ken Dale. Archie has been translated and published in foreign languages including French where he is known as both Archie Le Merveilleux Robot (The Marvellous Robot) and Archie l'homme d'acier (The Man of Steel) and Dutch, Archie de Man van Staal (The Man of Steel).

Another famous creation also for Lion was the anti-hero The Spider, which after the character's conception and first two complete stories was subsequently scripted by Jerry Siegel (though Cowan would return to script "The Bubbles of Doom" for the character's Super Library Stupendous Series). These first two stories by Ted Cowan were reprinted in full in 2005 in a new hardback picture strip book, the King of Crooks, together with other content.

His Tarzanesque jungle story Saber King of the Jungle for Tiger was later reprised in France as Yataca.

Cowan died in the early 1970s.

== Pseudonyms ==
Edward George Cowan has written under variations of his real name as well as pseudonyms, including (but not limited to):

- Ted Cowan
- E. George Cowan
- Edward G. Cowan
- Denise Cowan (for the girl's story market)
- George Forrest
- Geo. Forrest

There are other unrelated authors who have written under the name of George Forrest. The content will tend to indicate which scripts were written by Ted Cowan, who wrote almost exclusively for the boys / girls / comic market.

== Script accreditations ==
Script accreditations include (but are not limited to):

- Robot Archie - Lion
- The Spider - Lion
- Paddy Payne - Lion
- Sandy Dean – Lion
- Roy of the Rovers - Tiger
- Saber King of the Jungle - Tiger
- Billy Binns and his wonderful specs - Boys' World
- Smokeman / UFO Agent - Eagle
- Blackbow the Cheyenne - Eagle
- Girls' Crystal Libraries
- Nick Jolly the Flying Highwayman – Hotspur (comic) 1975, DC Thomson & Co. Ltd.

Short Stories in Hard Cover Compilations:

- On the White Fang - Edward G. Cowan: Boy's Choice, (No ISBN); First Published 1965, Golden Pleasure Books Ltd., London
- The Prey – Ted Cowan: Supernatural Stories for Boys, ISBN 978-0-600-38452-6, 1st edition (1968), The Hamlyn Publishing Group Ltd.
- Not Our Pigeon – Ted Cowan: Purnell's Book Of Spy Stories
- The Dead Don't Ride – Geo. Forrest: Purnell's Book Of Spy Stories, ISBN 0-361-05769-5; Published 1983, Purnell Books, Bristol
