= Frank S. Pepper =

- Born: Frank Stuart Pepper; 8 February 1910 Ilford, North East London, England
- Died: 11 December 1988 (aged 78) Cornwall, England
- Area: Writer
- Pseudonyms: John Marshall; Mark Grimshaw; Hal Wilton; Rupert Hall; John Morion
- Notable works: Roy of the Rovers; Captain Condor; Jet-Ace Logan
- Collaborators: Joe Colquhoun

Frank Stuart Pepper (8 February 1910 – 11 December 1988) was a British writer of comics and story papers for Amalgamated Press, best known as the creator of Roy of the Rovers and Captain Condor.

== Biography ==
Born in Ilford, North East London, on 8 February 1910, on leaving school he joined the staff of The Children's Newspaper as an office boy in 1926, under editor Arthur Mee. He started by writing captions, then longer pieces, and by 1930 was selling articles to other papers on a freelance basis. He went freelance full-time in 1931, writing for numerous newspapers and magazines.

In the mid-1930s he started selling stories to the boys' story papers, his first story being "Snapshot Sammy" for The Triumph. Editor Reg Eves commissioned him to write a series about a boxing airman, "Rockfist Rogan", for The Champion in 1937, which he went on to write, under the pseudonym Hal Wilton, for the next 22 years. Also for The Champion, he wrote football serial "Danny of the Dazzlers" under the pseudonym John Marshall, and "Colwyn Dane" as Mark Grimshaw. He also wrote "The Adventures of Beau Brummell" for Knockout and "The Return of Monte Cristo" for The Comet, as John Morion. For The Children's Newspaper, he wrote the adventures of twins "Bill and Jill", starting in 1948.

In 1952 AP launched Lion, a weekly adventure comic designed to compete with Hulton Press' Eagle, for which Pepper wrote the cover feature "Captain Condor", a space hero created to rival Eagle's "Dan Dare", for twelve years. He also created the cover feature for AP's sports comic Tiger, in 1953: editor Derek Birnage requested a more realistic football series than "Danny of the Dazzlers", and Pepper gave him "Roy of the Rovers", illustrated by Joe Colquhoun, who took over writing the strip, from Pepper's outline, after four episodes, using the pseudonym Stewart Colwyn. Other series he wrote scripts for included "Dan Dare" for Eagle, "Jet-Ace Logan" in The Comet and Tiger and "The Spellbinder" for Lion.

He retired from comics in 1983, and started compiling collections of quotations, including Twentieth Century Quotations, Contemporary Biographical Quotations, Dictionary of Biographical Quotations and Twentieth Century Anecdotes. He died in Cornwall on 11 December 1988. He was married and had four children.
