= Alfonso Font =

Spanish comics artist (born 1946)

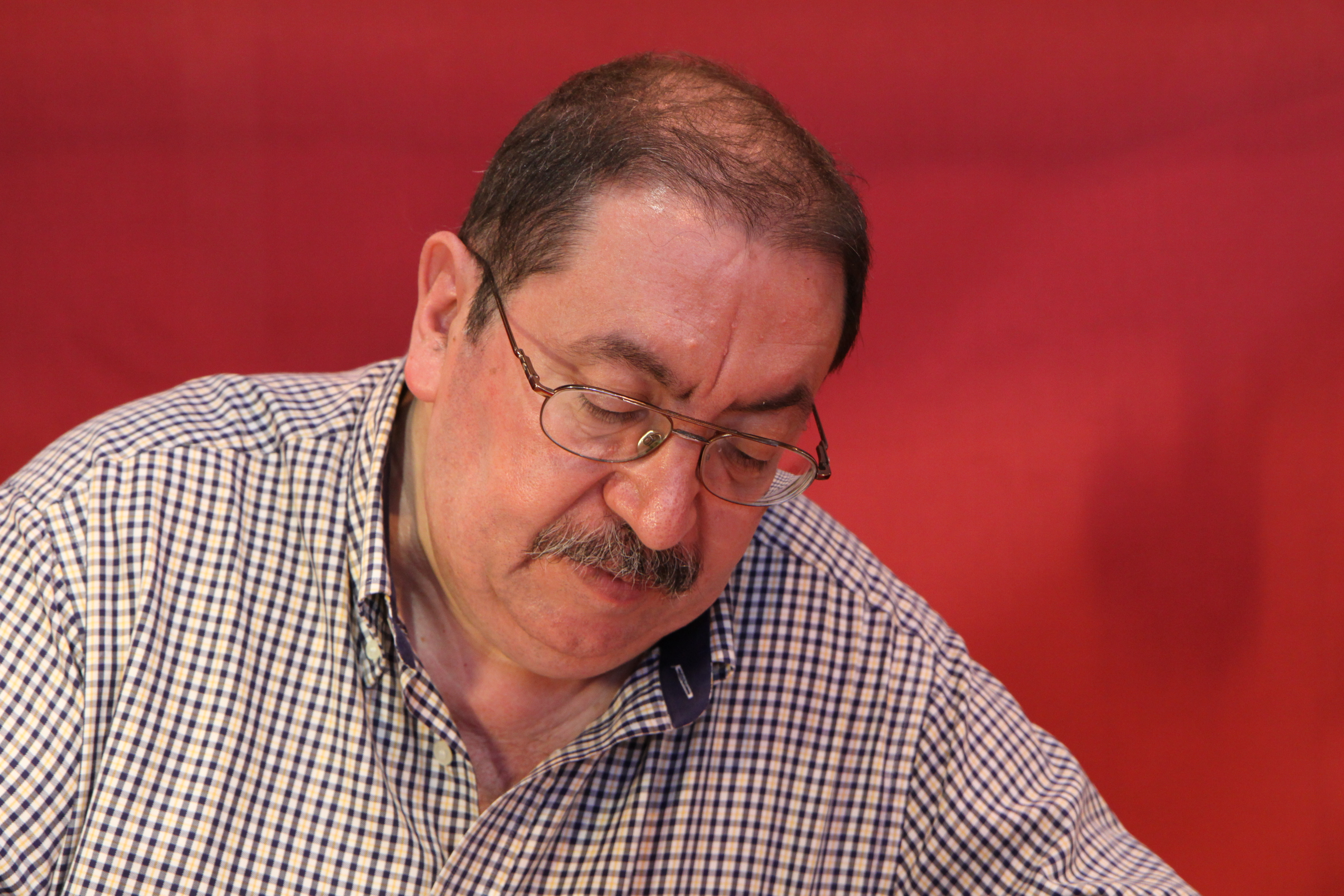
- Alfonso Font in 2010
- Born: 28 August 1946 (age 79); Barcelona, Spain
- Occupations: Comic book artist, illustrator
- Writing career
- Years active: 1964–present
- Genres: Science fiction, adventure
- Notable works: Historias negras (Dark Stories), Cuentos de un futuro imperfecto (Tales of an Imperfect Future), El prisionero de las estrellas (The Prisoner of the Stars), Clarke y Kubrick, Espacialistas Ltd (Clarke & Kubrick: Spatialists Inc.), Jon Rohner, marino (Jon Rohner, sailor)
- Notable awards: Haxtur Award (1990); Barcelona International Comic Fair Award (1993); Yellow Kid Award (1996); U Giancu's Prize (2004)
- Website: alfonsofont.com/en

Alfonso Font (born 28 August 1946) is a Spanish comic book artist.

== Biography ==
Alfonso Font was born in Barcelona, Spain. He began his comics career in the 1960s as apprentice in the local Editorial Bruguera studio, working mostly at western, war, mystery and horror series, especially for foreign publishers. In the 1970s he worked for the British publisher Fleetway to several comics, in particular war series such as Black Max; later he would also work for American publishers Warren Publishing and Skywald. During the latter decade, he shortly moved to Paris, where he collaborated with the magazine Pif gadget for which, among the others, he created the science fiction series Les Robinsons de la terre (The Robinsons of Earth). In 1972 he illustrated the series Geminis, written by Carlos Echevarría, dealing with espionage adventures set in World War I.

Between the 1970s and the 1980s Font realized his most famous series: Historias negras (Dark Stories), a collection of eighteen short, dark humorous adventures, and the science-fictional Cuentos de un futuro imperfecto (Tales of an Imperfect Future). This was followed in 1982 by the similar, though more hilarious El prisionero de las estrellas (The Prisoner of the Stars), an ecological-themed series, and Clarke y Kubrick, Espacialistas Ltd (Clarke & Kubrick: Spatialists Inc.). Though the two main protagonists' names are those of the creators of 2001: A Space Odyssey, author Arthur C. Clarke and film director Stanley Kubrick, this series' is mostly inspired by Robert Sheckley's short stories. In 1982 he also released an erotic comic series entitled Carmen Bond.

In 1985 Font created Jon Rohner (initially as Jann Polynesia), a comics about a seaman's wanderings inspired by tales of authors such as Jack London and Robert Louis Stevenson. The series won the Haxtur Award in 1990 as "Best Short Comics" in the Salón Internacional del Cómic del Principado de Asturias at Gijón.

In 1987 he created Taxi, about a young female taxi driver who lives a series of spy adventures. The Italian magazine L'Eternauta, in 1988, published his series Alice e gli Argonauti (Alice and the Argonauts), a science fictional adventure of a young girl searching for her father, imprisoned by a dictatorial government. Also in Italy, he published a series of self-contained stories entitled Private Eye, about a private detective, and Bri D'Alban, about the clash between the Catholic church and the Cathar heretics during the early 13th century.

In 1993 Font received the Great Prize at the Barcelona International Comic Fair, in Barcelona, Spain, for his whole career.

In 1996 he received the Yellow Kid Award at the Lucca Comics & Games event, in Lucca, Italy.

In 1998 Font drew for Sergio Bonelli Editore a special comic book for Tex Willer (#12, 1998). Four years later he became a regular member of the staff working at Tex ongoing series; in 2012 he also worked at a short story of Dylan Dog.

In 1999, with writer Ewald Fehlau, he adapted Jason Dark's ghost hunter for German Publisher Bastei Verlag. In 2004 he was one of the artists called for the revamping of Pif Gadget, appearing with the pirate comic Les Aventures de Trelawney, written by Richard Marazano. In 2010 he provided art for the medieval historic series Heloise de Montfort, also with script by Marazano.

Starting in 2003, many of his classic stories were reprinted in Spain, in books such as Historias negras (Dark Stories) (2003), El as negro (The Black Ace) (2004), Barcelona al alba (Barcelona at Dawn) (2004), Federico Mendelssohn Bartholdy (2007), Jon Rohner, marino (Jon Rohner, sailor) (2008), Historias negras (Dark Stories) (2017), Taxi (2018), La flor del nuevo mundo (The Flower of the New World) (originally published as The Epos of Chile) (2018.)

He is still active, and his most recent album, Aloma: The Treasure of the Temerario was published in Germany and The Netherlands in 2018.
