= List of Tiger stories =

A list of stories published in the Amalgamated Press/Fleetway Publications/IPC Magazines weekly boys' comic Tiger between 1954 and 1985.

== Achtung! It's Messy Schmidt ==
Published: 29 February to 26 December 1964
Artist: Ron Clarke

The misadventures of a Luftwaffe pilot who maintains an upbeat demeanour despite crashing every single plane he sits in, to the fury of commanding of officer von Spotz.

- Cartoon.

== The Amazing Exploits of Tornado Jones ==
Published: 20 September 1975 to 12 December 1976
Writer: Scott Goodall
Artist: James Bleach

Australian daredevil 'Tornado' Jones attempts numerous high-publicity stunts.

- Jo Tallon from "Tallon of the Track" appeared as a guest character.

== Art King ==
Published: 15 June 1964 to 8 May 1965
Artist: Joe Colquhoun

Art King's prowess in motorcycle road racing soon earns him the nickname 'Knight Rider'.

== Autograph Albert ==
Published: occasional from 12 September 1970
Artist: Norman Mansbridge

An enthusiastic schoolboy will stop at nothing to get the autographs of famous sports stars – and usually ends up infuriating his idols as a result.

- Cartoon.

== The Barbed Wire XI ==
Published: 6 December 1969 to 25 November 1972
Artist: James Bleach

After Nazis use a secret complex of underground tunnels to kidnap key scientists a top-secret unit of 11 hardened Commandos is put together to rescue them.

- The strip featured the characters MacTavish and O'Toole, who had previously appeared in their own strip.

== The Battling Birdmen ==
Published: 19 March to 25 June 1966

During World War II, Petty Officer Pete Parsons and gunner Tug Wilson battle Germans from a northern Fleet Air Arm airbase. Despite using a Blackburn Roc, the pair experience considerable success.

== Battler Britton ==
Published: 2 July to 5 November 1966

The adventures of a World War II British fighter ace.

- Reprints from Sun.

== The Battling Lumberjack ==
Published: 21 April to 9 Jun 1956
Writer: Edward Home-Gall

Canadian woodcutter Ben Beaver works his way through regional boxing rivals as he aims to become a prizefighter.

== Biff Bailey – Fighting Fury ==
Published: 21 April 1956 to 10 January 1959
Writer: Frank S. Pepper (under the pseudonym Hal Wilton)
Illustrator: R. Simmons

With help from his manager Terry Watts, British boxer Biff Bailey becomes a star heavyweight in America.

- Text story.

== Big-Hit Briscoe ==
Published: 6 June to 17 October 1959
Writer: Frank Winsor

Bill Briscoe tries to balance his ambition of becoming a first-class cricketer for Lentshire with his day job working on a construction site.

== Big-Hit Swift ==
Published: 8 November 1969 to 12 September 1970
Artist: Denis McLoughlin

After an accident injures several members of Midshire's cricket team on a tour of Australia, holidaying amateur player Barry Swift gets a dream opportunity.

== Bill and Chris Burnett ==
Published: 9 April 1960 to 21 February 1961
Artists: Reg Bunn, Graham Coton (Note: Due to most British comics not crediting creators and incomplete records, credits may not be exhaustive)

Brothers, racers and engineers Bill and Chris Burnett build a sports car special in their garage and enter it in the 24 Hours of Le Mans.

- The serials starring the Burnett brothers featured no banner title; the first was titled "High Performance" (9 April to 9 July 1960); the second was "Specialists in Speed" (16 July to 22 October 1960); the third was "Brady's Aces" (29 October 1960 to 25 February 1961).

== Billy's Boots ==
Published: 23 December 1961 to 8 September 1962, 1 December 1962 to 13 July 1963
Artist: Frank Purcell

Billy gets a pair of technologically advanced football boots that turn him into a star player.

- Cartoon. Not to be confused with the more renowned picture strip (see below). Renamed "Billy's Big Break" between 7 July and 8 September 1962.

== Billy's Boots ==
Published: 12 October 1974 to 30 March 1985
Writer: Fred Baker
Artist: John Gillatt

After discovering the ancient boots of former footballer Charles 'Dead Shot' Keen, young Billy Dane finds himself playing with the skill of the late England International.

- Continued from Scorcher and Score, continued in Eagle.

== The Black Archer ==
Published: 2 July 1966 to 7 October 1967
Artists: Eric Bradbury, John Gillatt

Clumsy TV reporter Clem Macey leads a double-life as the costumed crimefighter called the Black Archer.

== Black Patch the Wonder Horse ==
Published: 5 April to 10 May 1969
Artist: Sandy James

Stable boy Davey Tyler buys a fast horse called Black Patch from a mysterious gypsy, and plans to use the steed as a champion racer and save Garsdale Racing Stables from financial trouble.

- Continued from Jag.

== Blood Knife ==
Published: 25 June to 3 September 1966
Artist: Alberto Giolitti

Comanche warrior Blood Knife accidentally strays into a valley terrorised by prehistoric monsters. He vows to defend the people of the lost civilisation.

== Brad Nolan ==
Published: 18 June 1960 to 14 January 1961, 20 November 1965 to 18 June 1966 (reprints), 2 March to 20 April 1968 (reprints)
Artists: Geoff Campion, Eric Bradbury, Don Lawrence, Ted Kearon

Cowboy Brad Nolan seems to have his nascent boxing career ruined when jealous Cy Baxter causes him to break his arm at the ranch. Nolan's boss, former fighter Jake Maddock, warns him he will never fight again but Nolan remains determined to seek out his dream.

- The strip was initially titled "Outlaw Puncher" and then "Champ of the Barbary Coast" until Nolan's name was added to the title partway through the second serial.

== Bulldog Bryant ==
Published: 11 September 1954 to 30 April 1955
Writer: Richard Haywood

Freelance adventurer and pilot Bulldog Bryant gets into adventures, aided by chum Steve Martin.

== Carr Street United ==
Published: 7 February 1970 to 9 October 1971

In the rundown northern industrial town of Checkley, Tom Brown recruits friends and neighbours to put together a football team.

== Casey and the Champ ==
Published: 9 May 1964 to 6 February 1965
Artists: Joe Colquhoun, John Vernon

Hot-headed Irish train driver Casey runs his equally cantankerous steam locomotive 'Champ' between San Francisco and Denver.

== Casey's Crew ==
Published: 21 January to 7 October 1967

Tank commander Casey and his crew – Sparrow, Prof, Tosher and Tich – advance through World War II Europe in a chaotic but successful fashion.

== Castaways of Shark Island ==
Published: 23 November 1963 to 13 June 1964,
Artist: Don Lawrence

The same characters later appeared in "Rivals from the Black Gold". Later reprinted in Hurricane.

== Charlie Champ's War ==
Artist: James Bleach

Sporting polymath Charlie Champ is deployed to France in World War II and soon finds a way to put his myriad skills into use against the Wehrmacht.

== Come on the Scruffs ==
Published: 28 December 1968 to 29 March 1969
Artist: Selby Donnison

When the village school of Scruffley is threatened with demolition and amalgamation with snobby private school Crenton. To thwart this, pupils Ginger Nutt and Chubby Merlin put together a football team to win the County Cup.

== Commando One ==
Published: 24 October 1959

Captain Rex Royal of the Commandos is parachuted behind German lines to aid the resistance on Crete in 1942.

- Continued from Comet. The character subsequently joined the cast of "Spike and Rusty".

== Crisis Carson ==
Published: 28 September 1963 to 16 May 1964
Artist: John Stokes

- Later reprinted as "Speed Mann" in Eagle and "Chris Carron" in Valiant.

== Custer ==
Published: 5 April to CHECK
Artist: David Sque

George Armstrong Custer leads the 7th Cavalry in the Indian Wars.

- Continued from Jag.

== Danny Jones Time Traveller ==
Published: 22 February 1964 to 6 February 1965, 12 February 1966 to 28 January 1967 (reprints)

Fishing in a pond, schoolboy Danny Jones finds an ancient clock that can move anyone touching it backwards and forwards in time when the hands are moved.

- Continued in Hurricane after the original run.

== Death Wish ==
Published: 1 November 1980 to 30 March 1985
Writer: Barrie Tomlinson
Artists: Vanyo

Left with huge facial injuries after a crash, Formula One ace Blake Edmonds dons a mask and sets put to find a stunt that will kill him.

- Continued from Speed, later continued in Eagle.

== Dodger Caine ==
Published: 11 September 1954 to 30 November 1957
Writer: Ted Cowan

Dodger and his pal Tubby Travers cause chaos at Greenway College with their pranks and wheezes.

== Don't Rile Rinty O'Reilly! ==
Published: 10 February to 24 March 1962
Artist: Geoff Campion

Kind-hearted Irishman Rinty O'Reilly has the skills to become a boxer and is persuaded to go for the championship by friend and manager 'Blarney' Stone so he can afford to fund his dream of buying a farm. However, O'Reilly is reluctant to fight with ferocity – until someone finally exhausts his huge reserves of patience.

== Dynamite on Wheels ==
Published: 28 October 1961 to 10 February 1962

Jeff Walpole builds a sportscar in his garage and takes it to time trials, only to end up unintentionally upstage the Falkland factory's launch of their new Firebird racer. Despite his efforts to explain, Jeff soon finds himself in a bitter rivalry with Falkland ace Ron Sanderson.

== Ethelred the Unready ==
Published: 22 May to 17 July 1965
Artist: Roy Davis

- Cartoon, reprinted from Sun.

== Fairs Please ==
Published: 7 February to 12 September 1970

Bus conductor Frank Fair and his driver uncle Felix get in a variety of scrapes in their public transport jobs.

== The Fiery Furnaces! ==
Published: 8 October 1966 to 27 May 1967
Artists: Alberto Giolitti, Alex Henderson

Footballing brothers Red and Coke Furnace find themselves stranded in the jungle after a plane crash, and begin to make their way back to civilisation.

== The Fighting 13 ==
Published: 1 June 1963 to 13 March 1965
Artist: Colin Dudley-Page

The exploits of Rugby league team Wurnley City, coached by Sid Blenkinsop and captained by Harry Oldcastle.

== The Fighting Navy ==
Published: 31 March to 18 August 1962
Writer & Artist: Joe Colquhoun

- Reprints of "Biff Benbow" from The Champion.

== File of Fame ==
Published: 12 August 1978 to 1 May 1982
Writer: Terry Magee
Artist: James Bleach

The sports editor of the Daily Globe newspaper shares interesting stories he has covered in his journalistic career.

- The unnamed host, his newspaper and his subjects were all fictional.

== Fisty Flynn ==
Published: 9 April 1983 to 9 June 1984

Schoolboy Terry 'Fisty' Flynn is forced to relocate to the remote island of St. Columba in the South Atlantic when his father, diplomat Sir Nigel Flynn, is appointed governor. Terry's unhappiness and quick temper means he struggles to settle in – a situation that is not made easier when the South American country of Beruvia begins funding rebel attacks on the island.

== Football Family Robinson ==
Published: 5 April 1969 to 5 October 1974
Writer: Tom Tully
Artists: Joe Colquhoun, John Gillatt

Thatcher United would be an average unremarkable lower Division Four side but for the bizarre nature that their entire squad and staff are all part of the massive extended Robinson family, who must try to keep the club from falling into the hands of local businessman Max Sharkey and his plans to turn their ramshackle ground into a supermarket.

- Continued from Jag.

== The Forest Rangers ==
Published: 28 May to 19 November 1966

A group of young rangers learn about nature and the wild in Canada.

- Based on the CBC/ITC television series.

== Golden Boy ==
Published: 10 June 1984 to 30 March 1985
Artist: Mike Western

Athletically gifted feral boy Jamie Speed is discovered running on the moors. Subsequently, Jamie is adopted by a police officer known as Seargent Joe who helps the boy become a professional athlete. However both Jamie and Joe find the world of athletics has an unsavoury side.

- Continued in Eagle.

== The Great Thespius! ==
Published: 14 October 1967 to 19 October 1968
Artists: John Gillatt, Sandy James

Once acclaimed as one of the world's finest actors, Irving Thespius grows bitter when his fame begins to fade. After noting the publicity accorded to the supervillain Plunder Man, Thespius aims to reclaim the spotlight by becoming a world-feared villain.

- Later reprinted in Eagle Picture Library.

== Hawaka ==
Published: 12 July 1958 to 11 June 1960, 24 July 1965 to 26 February 1966 (reprints)
Writer: Roy Leighton
Artists: Ted Kearon, Eric Bradbury

Cherokee warrior Hawaka protects innocents from threats and monsters, and later teams up with Buffalo Bill.

== Helmet Head ==
Published: 30 November 1968 to 29 March 1969

Bookish Clem Hawkins is bequeathed a newspaper in the frontier town of Coltsville, the most lawless settlement in the West. Thankfully his uncle has also left him a robot gunslinger, and the pair set out to clean up Coltsville.

- Rebellion Developments editor Keith Richardson named "Helmet Head" as the story he would most like to see revived in a 2021 interview.

== HMS Outcast ==
Published: 12 June to 14 August 1965

The obsolete destroyer HMS Outcast once again seems destined for scrap before the ship and her oddball crew are recalled for another mission.

- Previously in Hurricane.

== A Horse Called Ugly ==
Published: 12 February 1972 to 14 September 1974

After a spat with stable owner Clive Mannering, unruly groom Joe Larcombe sets out to be a jockey for a rival stable by taming the similarly rowdy stallion Ugly.

== Hot Shot Hamish ==
Published: 12 October 1974 to 30 May 1980
Writer: Fred Baker
Artists: Geoff Campion, Julio Schiaffino

Blessed with a towering physique and a net-busting shot, amiable Hebridean footballer Hamish Balfour joins Princes Park and soon makes an impact on the Scottish Premier Division.

- Continued from Scorcher and Score. Later continued in Roy of the Rovers.

== Hunter's Vengeance ==
Published: 14 October 1967 to 24 February 1968

A syndicate of wealthy men fund the work of brilliant young inventor Don Hunter, only for him to discover his benefactors plan to use his creations for crime. Hunter instead sets out to bring the cabal to justice.

== A Hurricane Has Two Fists ==
Published: 16 September 1961 to 3 February 1962
Artist: Geoff Campion

Quick-fisted Ryk Marangi leaves the tropical Peaceful Islands to pursue a career as a boxer in America.

== Ice Wizard of the Redwood Rockets ==
Published: 12 October 1957 to 5 July 1958
Writer: Roy Leighton
Artist: Ted Kearon

Canadian ice hockey star Bud Wilmott transforms the fortunes of the Redwood Rockets.

== The Inquisitors ==
Published: 16 March to 23 November 1968

Investigator Simon Lash seeks out mysterious supernatural incidents, aided by retainer and reformed criminal 'Knocker' White.

== The Jailbird Commandos ==
Published: 24 July 1965 to 14 January 1967
Artists: Carlos Cruz González, Reg Bunn

During World War II, former police detective Dave Danford becomes a captain in the Commandos. Charged with putting together a team for top secret missions, Danford recruits six wily criminals he put behind bars.

== Jeff Jackson Takes the Wheel ==
Published: 25 January to 15 November 1958
Writer: George Forrest
Artist: Graham Coton

== Jet-Ace Logan ==
Published: 24 October 1959 to 9 March 1968
Writers: David Motton, Michael Moorcock, Kenneth Bulmer, Frank S. Pepper
Artists: John Gillatt, Geoff Campion, Brian Lewis, Graham Coton

A hundred years in the future, RAF pilot Jim "Jet-Ace" Logan and his trusty co-pilot Plumduff Charteris keep Earth safe from alien aggressors.

- Continued from Comet. Reprints from 22 August 1964 onwards.

== Johnny Cougar ==
Published: 31 March 1962 to 30 March 1985
Writer: Barrie Tomlinson
Artists: Geoff Campion, John Gillatt, Sandy James

With help from manager Bill MacLean, Everglades Seminole Johnny Cougar undergoes a career in the colourful world of international wrestling.

- Reprints from April 1984. Johnny Cougar returned in 1992 as host of Fleetway's short-lived wrestling magazine Johnny Cougar's Wrestling Monthly.

== Keep Fit Fred ==
Published: occasional from 24 October 1959
Artist: Arthur Martin

Clumsy Fred's exercise routines cause problems for neighbours and other passing members of the public.

- Cartoon.

== King of the Skating Aces ==
Published: 29 January to 20 August 1955
Writer: Frank S. Pepper (under the pseudonym John Marshall)

Zip King leads ice hockey team Royal Park Aces as player-manager.

- Text story.

== King of the Track ==
Published: 1 April 1978 to 25 October 1980

Barry King longs to be a motorcycle racer but his father bans him from even attending races after his brother Geoff is left in a wheelchair after a bike accident. Geoff himself is more supportive, and gets his old bike out of mothballs, planning to help Barry pursue a racing career behind their parents' backs.

== Lightning Lorant ==
Published: 19 March 1955 to 2 March 1957
Writer: Edward Home-Gall

French Foreign Legion soldier Jack Ripley moonlights as boxer Lightning Lorant while posted in North Africa.

- Later reprinted in Lion as "Law of the Legion".

== Louis Bernard ==
Published: 17 November 1962 to 7 October 1967; 23 March 1968 to 29 March 1969 (reprints)

Believing that a spate of monster sightings in the Caribbean are down to a notorious tiger shark known as Scarback, sea hunter Louis Bernard takes his nephew to investigate.

- The serials used no umbrella title; while Scarback would return on several occasions, only Bernard and his nephew were constants.

== MacTavish and O'Toole ==
Published: 5 April to 29 November 1969
Artist: James Bleach

- Continued from Jag. MacTavish and O'Toole later appeared in "The Barbed Wire XI".

== Martin's Marvellous Mini ==
Published: 10 April 1971 to 26 May 1984
Writer: Fred Baker
Artist: Angelo Todaro

Martin Baker is obsessed with becoming a rally driver but can only afford a clapped out £55 Mini. Christening the car 'George', Martin and his mechanic 'Tiny' Hill set about turning the Mini into a winner.

- In 1978, Tiger agreed to sponsor driver Martin Goodall in the National Mini Championship challenge, and the driver ran in the yellow/blue livery used by George in the strip.

== Master-Spy ==
Published: 9 April to 12 November 1983
Artist: Sandy James

John Master uses his status as the globetrotting British tennis number one to secretly carry out dangerous missions for British Intelligence.

== Men of Steel ==
Published: 14 October 1967 to 27 July 1968

Successful multi-discipline athlete Rod Steel sets himself the challenge of turning around the struggling Anvil Athletic Club.

== The Men Who Could Walk Through Walls ==
Published: 11 December 1965 to 5 February 1966
Illustrator: Reg Bunn

- Text story.

== The Mighty Smiths ==
Published: 25 June 1966 to 31 January 1970

Sam Smith wants to be a boxer and his brother Sid wants to be a boxing manager; the two brothers work together to try and get into the sport, while also running a market stall together.

== Mystery at Mountainsport School ==
Published: 5 January to 5 October 1957
Writer: Brian Leigh
Artist: Ted Kearon

The Mountainsport winter sports school in the Alps is the sight of strange goings-on. Pupils Chick Carey and Bill Gunn are determined to solve the mystery.

== Mystery Ice-Ace of the Arrows ==
Published: 13 September 1958 to 30 May 1959
Writer: Frank Winsor
Artist: Bert Vandeput

Ice hockey team Albury Arrows are assisted by the surprise arrival of an unknown talented player when one of their regulars misses a game. The stranger gives his name as Joe Brown and vanishes, leaving Arrows skipper Tank Carter determined to get to the bottom of the mystery.

== Nelson Lord, T.I.G.E.R. Agent ==
Published: 6 November 1965 to 24 June 1967
Artists:Geoff Campion, Joe Colquhoun, Sandy James

Nelson Lord is the top agent for British agency T.I.G.E.R (The International Group for Eliminating Revolution). Opposing him are the villainous A.T.A.C (Agents of Terror and Chaos).

== Nipper ==
Published: 12 October 1974 to 30 March 1985
Writer: Fred Baker
Artists: R. Charles Roylance, Francisco Solano López

Despite his slight build and young age making him a target for thuggish defenders, jet-heeled 'Nipper' Lawrence soon makes an impact for First Division side Blackport Rovers.

- Continued from Scorcher and Score. Reprints in March to May 1981 (using material from Score drawn by López, as Roylance was unwell) and from April 1984 onwards.

== The Nits of the Round table ==
Published: occasional from 26 November 1966
Writer & Artist: Leo Baxendale

Brave but clumsy knights Sir Lanceclot and Sir Fred (and their squire Varlet) battle the gargantuan ruffian Sid Slobb.

- Later reprinted in Buster.

== Nosey Parker ==
Published: occasional from 2 January 1965

An interfering schoolboy's habit of butting in causes problems for all and sundry.

- Cartoon.

== Olac the Gladiator ==
Published: 9 November 1957 to 1 March 1969
Writers: Brian Leigh, Willie Patterson
Artists: Ruggiero Giovanini, Don Lawrence, Carlos Roume, Gerry Embleton

Briton Olac becomes a successful gladiator in Ancient Rome, before being framed for a crime he didn't commit and becoming an outlaw. After clearing his name, Olac became a trusted agent of the Emperor.

- Reprints between 14 May 1966 and 1 June 1968.

== Paceman ==
Published: 13 October 1984 to 30 March 1985

Daydreamer Henry Hawkins is revealed to have a world class throw in a playground incident, and joins the school cricket team mainly to impress popular girl Shirley. While Henry has a fast bowling delivery from the start, his new teammates are less impressed with his other skills. However, sports master Alec Thompson is determined to whip Hawkins into shape.

== Paddy Ryan's Athletes Unlimited ==
Published: 13 January to 10 November 1962

Paddy Ryan runs Spartan House, a renowned all-round sports training school. His latest pupil is David MacArdle, who wants to emulate his father's Olympic-winning hammer throw.

- Spun off from "Roy of the Rovers".

== Peg-Leg's Penguins ==
Published: 14 October 1967 to 29 March 1969
Artists: Joe Colquhoun, Ian Kennedy

Pete Kelso loses part of his leg after battling the Red Baron in World War I, but remains upbeat and keeps flying. After the conflict he sets up the Flying Penguins air circus, but Kelso and his pilots are turned down on age grounds when World War II breaks out. Determined to help, they pinch a trio of obsolete Gloster Gauntlets destined for disposal, and soon prove their worth.

== Philip Driver ==
Published: to 3 April 1971
Artist: David Sque

After leaving a career as a British intelligence agent, Philip Driver attempts to become a professional golfer. However, he and his caddie 'Peanut' Jones still find themselves drawn into espionage.

== Police Dog Kim ==
Published: 26 November 1955 to 24 January 1959

Hound Kim and his handler P.C. 22 solve crimes in rural England.

== Pony Express ==
Published: 15 May to 17 July 1965
Artist: Geoff Campion, Bill Lacey

Good friends Buffalo Bill Cody and Texas Jack Omohundro compete for the government's Pony Express franchise.

- Reprints from Knockout.

== Pride of the 27th ==
Published: 24 October 1959 to 9 July 1960
Writer: Colin F. Thomas
Artists: Eric Bradbury, Reg Bunn

Captain Alex Pride and Sergeant Paddy O'Hara of the 27th Lancers are stationed in Kabul as the British Empire tries to keep control against Afghan tribes.

== Rex Barton ==
Published: 21 August to 27 November 1965
Illustrator: John Gillatt

Detective Rex Barton specialises in strange and uncanny cases.

- Text story.

== Rivals from the Black Gold ==
Published: 24 October to 7 November 1964

- Sequel to "Castaways of Shark Island".

== Robot Builders ==
Published: 9 April 1966 to 7 October 1967
Artists: Carlos Cruz González, Ron Turner

The Arrow family, made up of heroic geniuses, are known as the Robot Builders – an independent rescue organisation who have built fantastic machines to help those caught in disasters.

== Rockfist Rogan ==
Published: 26 March 1955 to 6 May 1961
Writer: Frank S. Pepper (under the pseudonym Hal Wilton)
Illustrators: R. Simmons, Joe Colquhoun, John Gillatt

As part of the roving Freelance Squadron of RAF trouble-shooters, Rockfist Rogan and navigator Curly Hooper battle the Germans.

- Text story.

== Rod and Line ==
Published: 18 December 1976 to 5 August 1978
Writer: Scott Goodall
Artist: James Bleach

Rod Harper sets out to be a top angler, despite the cost of fishing gear, school bullies and irascible landowners.

== Rogue Driver ==
Published: 16 February to 30 March 1985

== Roy of the Rovers ==
Published: 11 September 1954 to 25 March 1978
Writers: Frank S. Pepper, Joe Colquhoun (under the pseudonym Stewart Colwyn), Derek Birnage, Bobby Charlton (consultant only), Tom Tully
Artists: Joe Colquhoun, Bert Vandeput, Geoff Campion, Fred Holmes, Giorgio Trevisian, Paul Trevillion, Joan Marti, Yvonne Hutton, David Sque

Signed to the youth team of First Division Melchester Rovers, promising forward Roy Race progresses through the ranks of professional football.

- Joined by a parallel series in Roy of the Rovers in 1976, where the strip continued after leaving Tiger in 1978.

== Roy Race's Schooldays ==
Published: 25 April 1970 to 9 October 1971
Artist: Selby Donnison

- Prequel to "Roy of the Rovers".

== Runaway Reb ==
Published: 3 August 1968 to 29 March 1969

A farmhand called Reb gets fed up with his maltreatment from the tyrannical Spragg family and goes on the run. He is befriended by destitute ex-boxer Basher Binns, who soon realises Reb has the makings of a champion pugilist.

== Rusty Steele – Grand Prix Speedster ==
Published: 4 March to 27 May 1961
Artist: Graham Coton

Grand Prix rising star Rusty Steele lands a drive with the crack Lenca team, but a rival frames him for taking a bribe to throw a race. Unwanted by other teams, he becomes a haulage driver while trying to clear his name.

== Saber, King of the Jungle ==
Published: 8 July 1967 to 1 November 1969
Artists: Joe Colquhoun, Denis McLoughlin

Raised in the wild, white man Saber and his Zulu friend Umbala protect the jungle from all manner of threats.

== The School in the Wilds ==
Published: 26 May to 22 December 1956
Writer: Harry Belfield

A wilderness school in North-West America teaches pupils – including Dan Massey and his Inuit friend Ungook – outdoorsmanship and survival skills.

== Sergeant Rock, Special Air Service ==
Published: 15 May to 17 July 1965
Artist: Carlos Cruz González

Former paratrooper Sergeant Rock is called back into service to aid the SAS.

- Sequel to "Paratrooper" from Hurricane.

== Sintek ==
Published: 2 April 1982 to 30 March 1985
Writer: Tom Tully
Artist: Mike White

When American motorcycle star Bruce Tollman is horrifically injured in a race in Salzburg his shattered body is stolen from hospital by scientist Professor Sintek. He replaces most of Tollman's body with advanced robotic parts but is killed by his bitter assistant before the subject wakes. Tollman must try to work out what has happened to him while avoiding the blame for Sintek's death.

== Skid Solo ==
Published: 15 May 1965 to
Writer: Fred Baker
Artists: John Vernon, Graham Coton, John Stokes

Skid Solo advances through the ranks of Grand Prix racing.

- Continued from Hurricane.

== Slogger from Down Under ==
Published: 2 March 1968 to 29 March 1969

Australian Digger Dean arrives in Wiltshire to inherit his family's stately home. A resulting sift through the property documentation reveals the estate to actually be a tiny independent country, and Dean begins coming up with novel ideas to put the micronation on the map.

== Space-Age Kit ==
Published: 15 May to 18 September 1965

- Cartoon, reprints from Knockout.

== The Speed Ace from Cell 457 ==
Published: 9 January to 2 April 1960

Brent Daly is an ambitious sportscar driver hoping to impress factory team talent scouts – little knowing that he is also attracting the attention of master criminal The Director, who wants Daly as a getaway driver.

== Speedster from Bleakmoor ==
Published: 11 September 1954 to 6 January 1955
Writer: George Forrest

After serving a five year sentence in Bleakmoor Prison for a crime he didn't commit, racing driver Len Dyson sets out to clear his name.

== Spike and Dusty ==
Published: 16 February 1957 to 6 January 1957
Writer: David Gregory (under the pseudonym John Chester)
Artist: Reg Bunn

Spike North and Dusty Minto are Royal Navy frogmen turned freelance divers.

== Splash Gorton ==
Published: 8 November 1969 to 1 May 1971
Writer: Scott Goodall
Artist: Joe Colquhoun

Moustachioed hippie Splash Gorton shocks the establishment with his far-out personality and incredible swimming skills.

- After his own strip ended, Splash appeared in "Johnny Cougar" as the title character's second.

== Stand-In for the Mystery Speedster ==
Published: 6 August 1955 to 2 June 1956
Writer: George Forrest

- Later reprinted in Lion as "The Mystery Speed Star".

== Star Rider ==
Published: 16 February to 30 March 1985
Artist: Jose Casanova

- Continued in Eagle.

== Steadfast McStaunch ==
Published: 22 May to 18 September 1965
Artist: Denis Gifford

- Cartoon, reprints from Knockout.

== The Strongman ==
Published: 19 November 1983 to 6 October 1984
Artist: Sandy James

After an impressive performance at a strongman competition, Tommy 'Tiny' Tucker finds himself adopted by eccentric manager Hector Boskovic.

== The Suicide Six ==
Published: 13 January 1962 to 24 August 1963
Artists: Brian Lewis, Fred Holmes

A team of Commandos undertake highly dangerous missions in World War II.

== Tallon of the Track ==
Published: 13 October 1973 to 13 September 1975
Writer: Scott Goodall
Artist: James Bleach

When Dave Trent, captain of the Flying Ospreys speedway team, is injured he seeks a replacement. He finds talented but fiery Jo Tallon, who must overcome the sexism of her teammates and other competitors.

- Jo Tallon later appeared in "The Amazing Exploits of Tornado Jones".

== Terrible Tich ==
Published: 20 July 1963 to 14 March 1964

Brash young athlete Tich's attempts to gain an unfair advantage backfire repeatedly.

- Cartoon.

== Terror of the Jungle Railroad ==
Published: 10 December 1955 to 14 July 1956
Writer: Roy Leighton
Artist: Colin Dudley-Page

Jerry Grant and Lal Singh undertake a perilous journey through North India to deliver a bulldozer needed for railway construction.

== The Tigers ==
Published: 16 October 1971 to 5 October 1974
Artist: Ron Turner

Sports club The Tigers only have three members, which doesn't stop enthusiastic skipper Chunky Smith from entering them in a variety of competitions despite the protestations of the other two-thirds of the membership, Biff and Smithy.

== The Time 'Tec ==
Published: 14 October 1967 to 27 July 1968

Special agent Theo Platt specialises in investigations into unexplained incidents from the past, helped by good-natured boffin Professor Hourglass.

== Topps on Two Wheels ==
Published: 1 November 1980 to 9 June 1984
Artist: Mike Western

Eddie Topps continues his stunt career on homemade bike 'The Beast'.

- Continued from Speed.

== The Tough Game ==
Published: 2 April 1982 to 30 March 1985
Artist: James Bleach

Duggie Batson and 'Big' Ernie Barnes are aspiring Rugby League players in the town of Rushton. The pair sign for Rushton Town RFC and make fast friends with the burly 'Ape Man'. Later, after a fallout with Rushton, the three left to instead play for Potterdale.

== The Toughest Road Race in the World ==
Published: 22 November 1958 to 2 January 1960
Writer: George Forrest
Artist: Bert Vandeput

Racing driver Red Rawley and his trusty riding mechanic Phil Boyce enter their Super Meteor in the Trans-Africa Sports Car Race. The already daunting road race becomes even more dangerous when a mysterious foe with the alias Monsieur Exe attempts to sabotage their efforts.

== Triton Jones, Undersea Adventurer ==
Published: 17 May to 1 November 1969
Artists: Sandy James, Joe Colquhoun

Former swimming champion Triton Jones sets himself up as a diving adventurer.

== The Two-Wheeled Whirlwind ==
Published: 11 September 1954 to 10 December 1955 (text), 3 March 1956 to 6 September 1958 (strip)
Writers: Brian Leigh (both), Frank Winsor (strip only)
Artists: Bert Vandeput, Graham Coton

Rick Rowland establishes himself as Britain's top cyclist, helped by friend and trainer Bill Chubb.

== Typhoon Tracy ==
Published: 8 May 1965 to 31 January 1970
Artist: Geoff Campion, Mario Capaldi

Typhoon Tracy is a jovial 6' 6" soldier of fortune who travels the world onboard looking for excitement and adventure. On top of his towering physique he is superhumanly strong and invulnerable, attributes which can be both blessings and curses due to his general lack of common sense and caution.

- Continued from Hurricane, and later renamed "Typhoon Tracy – Troubleshooter".

== The Undersea Treasure Hunt ==
Published: 7 May to 3 December 1955
Writer: Roy Leighton
Artist: Colin Dudley-Page

Brothers Jeff and Colin Barton hunt for treasure on their boat Sea Spray off the Pacific island of Otahu.

== Val Venture ==
Published: 16 May 1965 to 19 March 1966
Artists: Jesús Blasco, Brian Lewis, Selby Donnison

Explorer Val Venture and his assistant Gloria investigate mysteries in the Middle East.

- No relation to the partner of Ace Hart.

== Young Charioteer ==
Published: 21 January to 29 December 1956
Writer: Brian Leigh
Artist: Ted Kearon

A Briton captured by Romans, Breton serves as a groom in the stables of Senator Messala. He soon discovers he has a gift for chariot racing.

== Young Hurricane ==
Published: 11 September 1954 to 30 March 1955
Writer: Edward Home-Gall
