= Death Wish (comics) =

British comic book story

- The cover to the Rebellion Developments collected edition Death Wish - Best Wishes, using a split face portrait to show Blake Edmonds' mask and scarred face. Art by Robin Smith and Vanyo.
- First appearance: Speed (23 February 1980)

Publication information
- Publisher: IPC Magazines; Fleetway Publications; Rebellion Developments
- Schedule: Weekly
Title(s)
Speed
23 February to 25 October 1980
Speed Annual
1980 to 1981
Tiger
1 November 1980 to 30 March 1985
Tiger Annual
1983 to 1987
Eagle
6 April 1985 to 23 January 1988
Eagle Annual
1988
- Formats: Original material for the series has been published as a strip in the comics anthology(s) Speed; Tiger; Eagle.
- Genre: Action/adventure
- Publication date: 23 February 1980 – 23 January 1988
- Main character(s): Blake Edmonds; Debbie; Suzi Walsh

Creative team
- Writer(s): Barrie Tomlinson
- Artist(s): Vanyo

Reprints
- Collected editions
- Death Wish Volume One: Best Wishes: ISBN 9781781086803

"Death Wish" is a British comic strip published by IPC Magazines, Fleetway Publications and Rebellion Developments. It debuted in the first issue of the weekly anthology comic Speed on 23 February 1980, and was created by writer Barrie Tomlinson. Art was provided by Vanyo. (Note: The professional name used by Spanish brothers Vicente Vaño Ibarra and Eduardo Vaño Ibarra.) The story revolved around racing driver Blake Edmonds, who was horribly disfigured in a plane crash and, donning a distinctive mask, embarked on a career of undertaking dangerous stunts in the hope of finding one that killed him – hence the strip's title. Later stories saw Blake transition to becoming a troubleshooting daredevil hero, and incorporated fantastical elements – including an appearance by Dracula. From September 1987, the strip was retitled "The Incredible Adventures of Blake Edmonds".

While Speed struggled to find a large audience and was cancelled after 31 issues, "Death Wish" was popular with readers and continued after Speed was merged with the long-running IPC title Tiger. When Tiger itself folded in 1985 the story continued once again in the pages of Eagle, where the character's adventures continued until 1988. Since 2016 the character and strip have been owned by Rebellion Developments.

== Creation ==
After stints editing Tiger and Roy of the Rovers, by 1980 Barrie Tomlinson had advanced to the post of Boys' Adventure Group Editor at IPC Magazines. After colleague Bob Paynter pitched the idea for a new boys' weekly comic based around the concept of speed, Tomlinson was assigned to create the new title. Having mainly worked on sports stories, he relished the challenge, enjoying writing "Death Wish" in particular - later recalling "it was a little bit different and I could bring all sorts of different aspects into the story". Art duties were assigned to Vanyo, a collective name used by Spanish brothers Vicente Vaño Ibarra and Eduardo Vaño Ibarra, hired via the Bardon Agency, and had previously drawn "Action Force" stories for Battle. Typically Eduardo would provide pencils, which Vicente would ink; this contrasted with most British artists on weekly titles, who would ink their own pencils, and allowed the pair to be prolific without losing quality. Vanyo would provide the art for the rest of the character's appearances - apart from when the pages for one episode were lost in transit, and veteran Rex Archer provided emergency replacements. A feature on the latter incident was included in the 1989 Eagle Annual.

The strip was not related to "Death Wish", a World War II strip which had appeared in IPC's Valiant title in 1976.

== Publishing history ==
"Death Wish" first appeared in the debut issue of Speed, cover-dated 23 February 1980. After some initial promise, Speed was cancelled at the end of October 1980, with selected contents merged to the long-running Tiger, at that time IPC's best-selling title. As one of the most popular strips in Speed, "Death Wish" was selected to continue; the strip would run for the final five years of Tiger's life, when the venerable comic was merged with the relaunched Eagle. During the story's run in Tiger, Edmonds crossed over with Skid Solo in the weekly as well as wrestler Johnny Cougar and cyborg motorcyclist Sintek in Tiger specials, while the weekly stories began incorporating supernatural elements.

Once again "Death Wish" remained popular with readers and would survive the amalgamation, with adventures appearing in Eagle until 1988 - with the increased fantasy elements seeing Edmonds battle Dracula at one stage. From 1987 the story was renamed "The Incredible Adventures of Blake Edmonds" in belated response to the strip's more upbeat nature, though it retained the subtitle 'A Death Wish Story'. As Eagle credited creators, Tomlinson was listed under the pseudonym 'D. Horton' as writer, retaining his name for editorial credits only. The story did appear in the 1992 Eagle Yearbook, but was only represented by reprints from two Tiger Annual appearances.

By then, IPC had consolidated their comics titles into a resurrected version of Fleetway Publications, which were sold to Pergamon Holdings and then Egmont Publishing. In 2016 these rights - consisting of characters first published after 1 January 1970, and 15 selected older characters who had been still appearing in Buster at the time of the deal - were sold to Rebellion Publishing.

Blake Edmonds was one of the characters chosen by Rebellion to appear in crossover meta-series The Vigilant as one of the members of the eponymous team. The 2018 one-shot starring the team featured a short new "Death Wish" back-up story, which saw Edmonds briefly meet an alternate version of himself from the universe of the infamous Action story "Kids Rule OK!".

In 2019, Rebellion issued the trade paperback collection Death Wish - Best Wishes, compiling the strips from Speed and Speed Annual.

== Plot summary ==
Even after retiring from motor-racing, handsome world champion Blake Edmonds remains a huge celebrity and darling of the public, and takes part in a lucrative land, sea and air race. While leading the event, he crashes a light plane into a forest; while he survives the crash and doctors are able to save his life, the resulting inferno leads his face permanently disfigured. To avoid his injuries being seen by himself or anyone else he commissions a leather mask to cover his ruined features; deciding his life no longer has value, Edmonds announced that he will undertake any daring stunt until he finds one that kills him. His first attempt came when he volunteered to become test driver for the experimental and unstable XK-Seven rocket car in a World Land Speed Record attempt, but despite the vehicle breaking up Blake survives. He takes up an offer from a film producer to drive a train in a real collision for a movie stunt and he decides to try a blindfolded parachute jump, but survives both. A thief steals Blake's mask and he gives chase, finding the resulting cross-town car pursuit thrilling, and while also deriving some satisfaction from saving a rival during a powerboat race. Despite clashes with authorities unwilling to facilitate Blake's stated death wish his various stunts continue to draw a huge audience, and he finds companionship when he is befriended by a blind girl called Debbie. She is kidnapped by Mafiosi to force Blake into undertaking a perilous cross-border money run, but he is able to free her from her captors.

Debbie encouraged Blake to undertake further stunts, and he refuses further surgical operations in the belief they won't make any significant difference. However, he gradually finds more positive uses for his daring, and begins foiling criminals as well as taking part in a multi-discipline race around the world - taking time out to toast the Wedding of Prince Charles and Lady Diana Spencer - and beating out underhanded rival Barry Jackson. Blake subsequently visited Debbie in America and undertook a series of televised stunts. After refusing an offer to show his face as an actor in a film, he is coerced into the role by studio executive Sydney Silversmith.

Later, he is talked into undergoing experimental advanced plastic surgery, only to grow antsy during recuperation and enter the Formula One New York Grand Prix race; battling eventual winner Skid Solo, he suffered a heavy crash but survived. Blake then accepted a challenge to a speedboat race against Bull Jackson between treatments; the pair collided, and called off the race after working together to survive shark attacks. The rebuilding of his face continued to gradually take shape while Edmonds continued to take part in numerous events to ward off boredom - only to be heavily injured again in a helicopter journey back from a race, leaving his face even more badly damaged than before. Wondering if fate wants him to look as he does, Blake declines to restart the surgery and instead throws himself into earning money through his feats. Blake is secretive about what he wants the money for, causing friction with even the ever-patient Debbie as he undertakes ever more absurd and dangerous stunts - including crossing a highly dangerous 'Death Valley' devised by millionaire Wilbur B. Wallace. While he made it across, Wallace died after trying to kill Blake, meaning he would earn nothing for his efforts.

After crashing in the South American jungle during a round-the-world air race he came into contact with a tribe under the command of an ex-Nazi turned witch doctor. Edmonds was able to escape, stumbling across kidnapped journalist Suzi Walsh, who has been caught investigating arms dealers selling guns to local tribes to stoke a war. Working together, Blake and Suzi were able to defeat both sets of villains, while she soon grew used to his face after some initial shock. The pair began making their way back to civilisation, adventuring along the way - dealing with murderous small-town businessman Senor Gomez and taking part in a rally. Having found South America thrilling, Suzi opted to stay behind when Blake returned to the USA. He then revealed the reason for his fundraising - to pay for pioneering eye surgery to restore Debbie's sight; tiring of society, he then returned to South America - believing Debbie would not want to see his face.

He arrived at his friend Tom's trading post to find Suzi was missing, taken prisoner by the vicious warlord Mendala. Blake fought his way through the jungle and was able to free her, while Mendala was killed by one of his own pet snakes. The pair then sought further excitement in Africa. There they investigated the murder of a game reserve owner and foiling the planned poaching of a pride of white lions, helped General Kaedanga overthrow a corrupt government after getting caught up in a coup, and recovering a stolen diamond from a mountain tribe before finding the natives were being exploited. Blake later went missing flying over the jungle and fell under the possession of a madman using a mixture of science and magic to create clones of Edmonds. With the help of some friendly ghosts, Suzi was able to free the real Edmonds and defeat the scientist.

The pair took on even more extraordinary cases, including recovering the jewels stolen from a woman's coffin by crime boss Kovolchick on behalf of the owner's ghost. In order to prevent Blake returning to undertaking lethal stunts, Suzi shot him in the arm and was imprisoned; Blake broke in to free her but she refused to escape. News reached a secret organisation who recruited him to free one of their members from prison in Asia, paying him by restoring his face. However, the unstable material used broke up during the mission and the man was killed moments from freedom. Finding the agency had only wanted to execute the prisoner anyway, a furious Blake refused to work for them again. As a result, the organisation's agents made several attempts to assassinate him, forcing Blake to eliminate them.

Suzie meanwhile had been released from jail and returned to journalism, only to be captured by a witch when reporting on a haunted house. Warned by one of the friendly ghosts that had helped them in Africa, Blake was able to rescue her. By this point, Edmonds was becoming as famed for his investigations as for his stunts, and was called to help solve the riddle of a haunted mine in East Yorkshire, again crossing paths with Suzie. The real culprits were a criminal gang using the abandoned mine as a base for printing counterfeit money, who the pair defeated. Blake then agreed to stay overnight in an apparently haunted house to raise money for charity, something which was harder than he expected.

Blake and Suzi reconciled, and subsequently encountered a werewolf in the West Country and ended its threat, attempting to recapture a misunderstood monster created by the University of Scientific Research, battled the evil forces of the sorcerer Devorous, the Fire Demon and defeated Count Dracula. The pair then spent some time miniaturised after being shrank by a deranged scientist; an attempt to restore them left the pair giant-sized until they were finally returned to their correct size - and decided to take a holiday.

== Collected editions ==
Title	ISBN	Publisher	Release date	Contents
Death Wish Volume One: Best Wishes	9781781086803	Rebellion Developments	11 July 2019	Material from Speed 23 February to 25 October 1980 and Speed Annual 1980 to 1981.

== Reception ==
Reviewing the 2019 collected edition for Broken Frontier, Andy Oliver noted the serial's nihilism and pace, calling Edmonds " one of the most memorable non-2000 AD characters of his era". However, Frank Plowright of Slings & Arrows felt that, despite the strong concept, the writing was limited, surmising "Tomlinson never really stretching himself beyond the target audience means it's still really only aimed at them almost forty years later".
