= Tony Harding =

British illustrator (1942-2014)

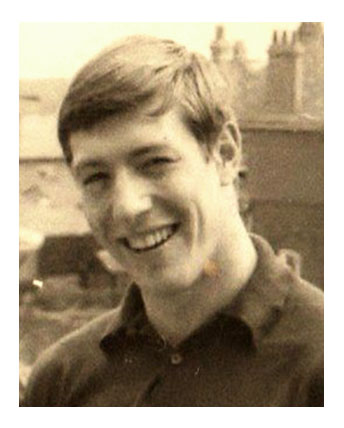
- Born: Anthony John Harding; 9 January 1942; West Ham, London
- Died: 12 January 2014 (aged 72); Isle of Wight
- Occupation: Illustrator of boys' adventure comics
- Known for: Roy of the Rovers, Scorcher, Action, Victor, Bullet, Scoop

Anthony John "Tony" Harding (9 January 1942 – 12 January 2014) was a British illustrator of boys' action comics specialising in football stories. He worked for D. C. Thomson & Co. and IPC Magazines in a career that spanned over 30 years, on comics such as Bullet, Scorcher, Hornet, Action, Roy of the Rovers, Victor and Scoop, amongst others.

== Biography ==
Born in West Ham, London, Harding joined Link Studios in London as a trainee, and began work as a comic artist for DC Thomson and IPC Magazines as a comic artist in 1962, while studying at Saint Martin's School of Art in the evenings and playing football for Gartan Sports FC in East London. A talented footballer, he helped them to win a host of trophies in the mid sixties to early seventies.

He went freelance aged 20 and, with the encouragement of his agent, went to live in Guernsey aged 21 in 1963. There he played for St Martin's FC and between 1963 and 1965 won several more titles and trophies. It was there he met his future wife, Ann, whom he married in 1967. However the distractions of life in Guernsey proved too much and Tony started missing his deadlines, so he returned to London. In 1972 he moved to Shanklin on the Isle of Wight, continuing to work freelance from home. On Saturdays he continued to play football, this time for Rookley FC, playing over 300 games in total and winning many more trophies. He was voted Life President of Rookley Football Club for his many years of service as player and captain.

Originally a Catholic, he became a born-again Christian in 1980, joining the Isle of Wight Full Gospel Business Men's Fellowship, of which he became Vice-President, and the Sacred Heart of Jesus Music Group.

Work in comics began to dry up in the early 1990s after Roy of the Rovers and The Victor ceased publication, so Harding became an Independent Arts teacher, using art to help people recovering from strokes, and worked with people with disabilities at Meadowbrook Day Care Center, where he founded the Isle of Wight Re-Cycle project, collecting over 1000 bicycles for Africa. He continued to work part-time on comics in the late 1990s for the Football Picture Story Monthly comic books for DC Thomson and Soccer Junior Magazine in the USA, and eventually left comics altogether in 2003. He suffered from an irregular heartbeat, and died suddenly on 12 January 2014, aged 72, while returning from work as a carer at Afton Ward at the Sevenacres mental health unit.

== Comics work ==
"Look Out for Lefty", Action, 1976–77

One of Harding's earliest strips was "Wonder Man" for The Victor in 1961–62. A revival of on an old prose serial from The Rover from 1946, it starred H. K. Rodd, a young man raised by scientists to be the perfect athlete. Another early strip was "Bouncing Briggs", which first appeared in The Hornet in 1963. Subtitled "the goalie who's good for a laugh", it featured Bernard Briggs, a young scrap metal dealer who became goalkeeper for Blackton Rovers after calling at the club grounds to collect some iron railings, and criticising their goalkeeper so loudly the team challenged him to have a go himself. The strip ran in The Hornet until 1976, and from then in The Hotspur until 1980.

Harding drew various strips for Roy of the Rovers between 1976 and 1993, but it was only in the annuals that he got to illustrate the adventures of Roy Race himself. In 1976–77 he drew the controversial football strip "Look Out For Lefty", written by Tom Tully, for Action, taking over from his friend Barrie Mitchell. Harding regarded it as a "cheeky", humorous story, but objected to some of the things he was asked to draw, for example refusing to depict Lefty sticking two fingers up to the crowd. He did draw a scene involving a character throwing a bottle from the crowd and hitting a player on the head, thinking the player was "such a horror" he deserved it.

Other comic strips he drew include:

- "Bobby of the Blues", Scorcher, IPC, January 1970 – June 1971, annuals 1973 and 1975
- "What's The Matter With Carter?, The Goalie Clinic Stories", The Victor, D. C. Thomson & Co., 1972
- "King Bernard", The Hornet, D. C. Thomson, 1972
- "Twisty", Bullet, D. C. Thomson, 1976–78
- "The Footballer Who Wouldn't Stay Dead", Roy of the Rovers, IPC
- "This Goalie's Got Guts", Scoop, D. C. Thomson, 1978–81, annuals 1980 and 1981
- "Roy of the Rovers", Roy of the Rovers annual 1981, IPC
- "The Safest Hands in Soccer", Roy of the Rovers, IPC
- "Andy Steel: Playmaker", Roy of the Rovers, IPC
- "Roy's Action Replay", All Action Monthly, Fleetway Publications, 1987
- "The Goals of Jimmy Grant", The Victor, D. C. Thomson, 1988
- "Mike's Misfits", The Victor, D. C. Thomson, 1990
- "Gary's Golden Boots", Roy of the Rovers annual 1993, Fleetway Publications
- "Fouls in the Box" (1998), "The Keeper and Rules" (1999), "Penalty Kick" (2000), "Corner Kick" (2000), Soccer Jr Magazine (US), D. C. Thomson, 1998–2000
- "Choker!", Football Picture Story Monthly, D. C. Thomson, no. 260
- "Men of Steel", Football Picture Story Monthly D. C. Thomson, no. 330, 2000
- "Blackmail", Football Picture Story Monthly, D. C. Thomson, no. 409, 2003
