= Scorcher =

Scorcher may refer to:

- Georgia Scorcher, a roller coaster at Six Flags Over Georgia
- HMS Scorcher (P258), a decommissioned S class submarine of the Royal Navy
- Perth Scorchers, an Australian men's cricket team
- Perth Scorchers (WBBL), an Australian women's cricket team
- Scorcher: The Dirty Politics of Climate Change, a 2007 book by Clive Hamilton
- Scorcher, a record label run by Jamaican deejay Errol Scorcher
- Scorcher, a fictional movie franchise referenced in the 2008 movie Tropic Thunder
- Scorcher (character), the name of a Marvel Comics supervillain
- Scorcher (DC Comics), the name of a DC Comics supervillain
- Scorcher (film), a 2002 science fiction disaster film
- Scorcher (magazine), a football-themed British comic magazine
- Scorcher (rapper), a grime artist from London, who has collaborated with Wiley, S.A.Q and Wretch 32
- Scorcher (video game), a futuristic racing video game by now-defunct developer Zyrinx
- Scorchers (women's cricket), an Irish women's cricket team
- Scorchers, the 1991 film

== See also ==
- Scorch (disambiguation)
- Scorched (disambiguation)
