= Scorched =

Scorched may refer to:

== Arts and entertainment ==
- Scorched (2003 film), a film starring John Cleese and Alicia Silverstone
- Scorched (2008 film), an Australian made-for-TV movie
- Scorched (play), a 2003 play by Wajdi Mouawad
- Scorched: South Africa's Changing Climate, a 2007 by Leonie Joubert
- Scorched (Mark-Anthony Turnage & John Scofield album), a 2004 album by Mark-Anthony Turnage and John Scofield
- Scorched (Overkill album), 2023 album by Overkill
- Scorched (comics), a fictional team appearing in comic books published by Image Comics

== See also ==
- Scorched Earth (disambiguation)
- Scorch (disambiguation)
- Scorcher (disambiguation)
