= Tommy's Troubles =

Football themed comic strip (1976-1986)

Tommy's Troubles was a British football themed comic strip which ran for ten years in the Roy of the Rovers comic and which is still fondly remembered by fans of the "golden age" of British sports themed comics. The strip debuted in the very first issue of Roy of the Rovers, dated 25 September 1976, and apart from a break of approximately three months in 1985, ran until a re-launch of the comic in 1986 saw most of the existing strips replaced, by which time it was the only remaining story from the comic's original line-up apart from the story of Roy himself. The final episode appeared in the issue dated 16 August 1986. The strip was usually written by Fred Baker and drawn by Ramiro Bujeiro. Episodes also appeared in many of the Roy of the Rovers annuals.

== Story overview ==
The story centred on teenager Tommy Barnes, who longs to be a professional footballer but has the misfortune to be sent to Crowhurst School, where only rugby is played. After a concerted campaign by Tommy and his pal Ginger Collins, the headmaster agrees to allow a school football team to be formed on the condition that Tommy is able to get into the school rugby team, which he eventually does.

Later, the school again discontinues its football team, so Tommy and Ginger form their own football club, Barnes United, and enter a local league. They persuade the local council to allow them the use of some disused tennis courts, where they lay their own pitch and build their own clubhouse. Tommy and his team are frequently beset by all manner of "troubles", such as not being able to raise a team or having to hitch-hike to away games as they cannot afford public transport. They also make enemies of two of Crowhurst's top rugby players, the conniving Adam Waller and his slow-witted sidekick Cyril Swate. Waller and Swate spend most of their time orchestrating various schemes to make Tommy's and his teammates' lives miserable, although Waller invariably gets his come-uppance. A memorable storyline of this type sees United enter a team in a five-a-side tournament, prompting Waller to enter a team of tough rugby players, his plan being to rough up the United players. The United players' superior skills nonetheless allow them to defeat the rugby players without great difficulty, and Waller ends up having to pay the tournament fees for his entire team.

=== The end of the original run ===
In Roy of the Rovers editions from the summer of 1985, however, Waller finally gets the better of Tommy when he manages to persuade the local council that Barnes United has disbanded, with the result that the council gives the use of their pitch to a girls' hockey team. Facing expulsion from the league without a ground on which to play, Tommy learns of a long-disused ground on the edge of town which had once been used by a local non-league team. The United players take over the ground and renovate it, allowing them to begin the new league season. After just a couple of matches, however, the owner of the land on which the ground stands makes his presence known and orders the team to vacate it. At the same time, Tommy learns that his father's job has been relocated and he has to move to a different part of the country. With the other players feeling that Barnes United cannot continue without him, Tommy leaves them with a parting message of "Never let your troubles get you down", and the strip came to an end.

=== The strip's return ===
Just a few months later, however, the strip made a return, apparently by popular demand. The story continued with the revelation that Barnes United have decided to continue after all after being allowed the use of a field by a local farmer. Without Tommy, however, they are rooted to the bottom of the league and the farmer does not allow them anything other than run-down old sheds in which to change. Just before Christmas, however, Tommy returns, having moved back to Crowhurst for reasons which are not made clear. He makes his return to the Barnes United team wearing a mask and calling himself "The Masked Avenger", so as to allow for a dramatic unmasking at the end of the first episode.

The strip's second run followed the same tone as the first, mixing on-field action with Tommy and his friends' various off-field "scrapes", which were usually engineered by Waller and Swate. United loses another ground when the farmer develops its facilities and then gives its use to a men's team, but they find and renovate yet another ground, financing the work via a 24-hour sponsored penalty shootout. The strip came to an end in 1986 with a final storyline in which Tommy's teammates come to believe that he is contemplating quitting football, but in the final episode he reveals that he'd always be playing football, whatever his "troubles".
