= Speed (British comics) =

British weekly comic

- The cover of Speed from 22 March 1980.

Publication information
- Publisher: IPC/Fleetway Publications
- Schedule: Weekly
- Format: Ongoing series
- Genre: Action/adventure
- Publication date: 23 February – 25 October 1980
- No. of issues: 31

Creative team
- Written by: Barrie Tomlinson
- Artist(s): John Gillatt; Barrie Mitchell; Ron Turner; Vanyo; Mike Western
- Editor: Barrie Tomlinson

Speed was a weekly British comics periodical published by Fleetway Publications from 23 February to 25 October 1980. A boys' adventure comic, the title only lasted for 31 editions before being merged with another Fleetway title, Tiger.

== Creation ==
Bob Paynter of Fleetway came up with the idea of a boys' anthology comic centred around the concept of speed, feeling it wasn't covered by the company's other output. At the time Paynter was group editor for the company's humour titles (at the time consisting of Buster, Jackpot, Whoopee! and Whizzer and Chips), but management felt the idea was better suited to the boys' adventure division. Having successfully modernised Tiger and launched Roy of the Rovers as a spin-off title, Barrie Tomlinson was assigned to create the new comic.

Having largely worked on sports comics for the previous decade, Tomlinson relished the challenge of Speed's wider mandate and came up with the outlines of the eight launch features himself before refining them with the artists. Sport still featured - "The Fastest Footballer on Earth!" featured Fourth Division bottom feeders having their fortunes transformed by the arrival of enigmatic, superhumanly fast teenager Mickey "Flash" Jordan. In addition to this 'straight' sporting endeavours, daredevil stunts - large in the British imagination of young British boys of the time due to the widely publicised promotional stunts of Evel Knievel and Eddie Kidd - played their part. "Topps on Two Wheels" regaled readers with the adventures of American stunt motorcyclist Eddie Topps; "Speedboy" brought the adventures of schoolboy Timothy Barlow and his obsession with breaking various world records he felt were within his means; and "The £1,000,000 Challenge". The latter concerned wealthy wheelchair-using thrill-seeker Cuthbert "Bullet" Slick; jaded by his injuries and a life of wild antics, he challenged the public for fresh challenges, promising a million pounds to anyone who came up with an idea that broke through his ennui. Readers were encouraged to submit challenges for Bullet, for which they were rewarded with £5.

Using a similar starting point was "Death Wish", which concerned the handsome Formula One driver Blake Edmonds. Horrifically injured in an accident, he dons a mask and becomes a nihilistic daredevil for hire in the hope of finding a stunt which will kill him. Written by Tomlinson and drawn by Vanyo (a name used by Spanish brothers Eduardo and Vicente Vano Ibarra), the story would fast become Speed's most popular feature, and would outlive the title itself by several years, not only making the switch to Tiger but continuing in the revived Eagle when the former was merged. Western "Quick on the Draw" told the story of 1880s gunfighter Luke Cassidy training orphaned Johnny Storm in fast-draw skills; science fiction story "Journey to the Stars", drawn by Ron Turner, told the story of an Earth family who find themselves in deep space onboard a starship after a botched alien kidnap attempt; and obligatory war story "Baker's Half-Dozen" which saw six North African campaign soldiers reluctantly moulded into a commando unit by the unconventional Sergeant Baker. Tomlinson would later recall the latter was an odd fit for the magazine and was unable to recall how it ended up in Speed, speculating it was a last-minute replacement that had been originally planned for Battle. Factual features meanwhile covered the same area, overviewing the subjects like Mario Andretti, Concorde, Stirling Moss, Barry Sheene, McDonnell Douglas F-15 Eagle and HMS Speedy.

== Publishing history ==
The first edition of Speed was dated 23 February 1980. As was typical for the industry of the time, early issues included free gifts to tempt new readers - the first a cover-mounted plastic glider promoted as a 'Speed Plane', the second a 'Speed Slider' detailing statistics of various real-life fast vehicles and the third a pair of ersatz board games. Due to the technology of the time it typically took 22 weeks for meaningful circulation data to emerge, which was combined with crude market research via the long-standing method of requesting readers to send in lists ranking their favourite stories. While Speed's sales were reasonable, the 22 August 1980 edition saw a reconfiguring of the contents - "Journey to the Stars" was dropped to make room for "Winner!", featuring the comeback attempt of Formula One driver Trevor Watson; "Baker's Dozen" was switched out for fighter pilot story "Hit and Run"; while "Quick on the Draw" disappeared for the light-hearted "Supersmith". However, it was only a temporary reprieve, and nine weeks later Speed readers were told of the news that the following week "two great papers join forces", and it was folded into Tiger after 31 issues.

== Legacy ==
Tomlinson later reflected that a 1980 journalist strike which had the side effect of causing a six-week hiatus damaged Speed's sales, referring to it as "the final nail in the coffin". "Death Wish" and "Topps on Two Wheels" were the only features to be carried on in Tiger; the former would even outlive its new home and transfer to the Eagle. The Tiger and Speed name was retained until 12 December 1981, while Speed Annuals had also been produced after the demise of the weekly.

== Stories ==
=== The £1,000,000 Challenge ===
Published: 23 February to 25 October 1980
Artist: Carlos Pino

Wealthy and easily bored, Cuthbert "Bullet" Slick searches for more and more thrills in dangerous stunts until an accident leaves him paraplegic. Even this didn't quash his thirst for excitement, and Bullet issued an open challenge to the public - anyone capable of suggesting a stunt that was still able to give him a rush would be rewarded with a cheque for £1,000,000. He was helped by faithful retainer Wiley, who would occasionally undertake the challenges when Bullet was physically unable to do so.

- The challenges were suggested by Speed readers; anyone whose idea was used would receive £5 and a novelty cheque for £1,000,000 signed by 'Bullet'.

=== Baker's Half-Dozen ===
Published: 23 February to 16 August 1980
Artist: Mike Western

Cut off from their various units in World War II, Privates Pete Carey, Gil Hardisty, Taff Moody, Joe Peach, Bert Rudge and Perot Singh all try to work together to escape from behind German lines in North Africa. Their efforts seem about to fail but before they can surrender they are saved by Sergeant Baker, a manic figure with sergeant stripes tattooed on his right arm and a set of handcuffs attached to his left wrist. An inspired leader and violent soldier, the enigmatic Baker hammers his ad-hoc unit of stragglers into a fast-moving, devastating team of guerrillas - whether they want to or not.

- The complete serial was collected in a 70-page limited edition volume by Hibernia Comics in 2014, featuring an introduction by Rufus Dayglo.

=== Death Wish ===
Published: 23 February to 25 October 1980
Writer: Barrie Tomlinson
Artist: Vanyo

Formula One ace Blake Edmonds seemingly has it all - world championships, millions of pounds and good looks. However, he crashes a plane during a dangerous multi-vehicle race. Hugely disfigured by burns and beyond the help of surgery, Edmonds slumps into depression. Hiding his ravaged face with a mask, he decides against suicide and instead decides to perform dangerous stunts for money in the hope he finds one that kills him.

- Continued in Tiger and then Eagle, eventually running until 1988. The strips from Speed (including the two annual stories) were collected by Rebellion Developments in a 2019 trade paperpack. The character of Blake Edmonds was also a major character in Rebellion's The Vigilant comic.

=== The Fastest Footballer on Earth ===
Published: 23 February to 25 October 1980
Artist: Barrie Mitchell

Mired at the bottom of Fourth Division, Mudport Town have an unlikely change of fortunes when former sea captain Jonah Jordan volunteers his adopted son Mickey as a player. The 16-year old soon proves a match-winning addition due to his seemingly superhuman turn of speed, and is soon nicknamed "Flash" by the long-suffering Mudport faithful as their fortunes turn. However, Mickey Jordan's child-like naivety and mysterious origin soon begin to attract prying journalists.

- While the strip itself was not continued after Speed folded, Mickey Jordan subsequently appeared in "The Marks Brothers" in Roy of the Rovers.

=== Hit and Run ===
Published: 23 August to 4 October 1980
Artist: Mike Western

With the Japanese advancing through Burma and Thailand, fighter ace Johnny Wolfe recruits fellow pilots Bronco Rogers, Jock Stewart, 'Duke' Edward Ogilvy-Smith, Mukah Dan and Snacker Wilson) as the Wolf Pack, who carry out daring strike missions in their P-40s.

=== Journey to the Stars ===
Published: 23 February to 16 August 1980
Artist: Ron Turner

Astronomer Sam Redford inadvertently spots the invasion craft of alien Toad-People. In response they kidnap Sam and his children, Andy and Gina. However, in the resulting struggle on board the alien vessel the ship's crew are teleported into space, leaving the Redfords in the strange ship millions of miles from home. With the help of robot Mark Four-ZQ (which they rename Spidey) the trio try to work out how to pilot the craft and return to Earth.

=== Quick on the Draw ===
Published: 23 February to 16 August 1980
Artist: John Gillatt

After his parents are killed by the Morton gang, Native American Johnny Storm turns to legendary gunfighter Luke Cassidy for aid. The weary veteran agrees to train Storm so he can avenge his family.

=== Speedboy ===
Published: 23 February to 25 October 1980
Artist: Mike White

Schoolboy Tim Barlow dreams of breaking world speed records. With the aid of various local friends and eccentrics he attempts to do so, typically finding out he has massively underestimated what's involved.

=== Supersmith ===
Published: 23 August to 25 October 1980
Artist: John Gillatt

Dim-witted Walter Smith is a dogsbody at the British Institute for Technological Advance, and an unscrupulous scientist there decide to use him as an ad-hoc guinea pig for a new procedure. As a result, whenever Smith sneezes he is transformed into an athletic superhuman for five minutes. He escapes the facility and is helped by friendly lab assistant Nick Carter while the person behind the unsanctioned experiment attempts to recover him.

=== Topps on Two Wheels ===
Artist: Mike Western
Published: 23 February to 25 October 1980

Mechanic Eddie Topps dreams of being a top motorcycle stunt rider. Working for superstar biker Wendell Wonder, he 'borrows' the prototype 'Golden Streak' one-off and crashes it. Fired, Topps buys the scrapped remains and rebuilds it as 'The Beast' and sets up his own stunt career as the Masked Mister Unknown.

- Continued in Tiger.

=== Winner! ===
Published: 23 August to 25 October 1980
Artist: Ron Turner

When Formula One ace Trevor Watson suffers head injuries during a horrific accident at the 1979 British Grand Prix, doctors tell him he will never race again. Watson is determined to prove them wrong and mounts a comeback.

- While the strip itself was not continued after the merger, the full extent of Watson's subsequent career was recounted in Tiger's "File of Fame" feature.

== Spin-offs ==
- Speed Summer Special (1980)
- Speed Annual (2 issues, 1981–1982)

== Collected editions ==
Title	ISBN	Publisher	Release date	Contents
Baker's Half-Dozen	N/A	Hibernia Comics Books	November 2014	Material from Speed 23 February to 16 August 1980 and Speed Annual 1981.
Death Wish Volume One: Best Wishes	9781781086803	Rebellion Developments	11 July 2019	Material from Speed 23 February to 25 October 1980 and Speed Annual 1980 to 1981.
