= Scorched Earth (disambiguation) =

Scorched earth is the military strategy or operational policy of destroying everything useful to the enemy.

Scorched Earth may also refer to:

== Books ==
- Scorched Earth: Australia’s Secret Plan for Total War a 2017 book by Sue Rosen
- Scorched Earth, a 2013 novel, the seventh and final book in the Henderson's Boys series by Robert Muchamore

== Games ==
- Scorched Earth (video game), a 1991 artillery game for IBM PC compatibles
- "Scorched Earth", a DLC for the survival game Ark: Survival Evolved
- In Minecraft PVP, Scorched Earth tactic is also a part of "griefing"

== Films and television ==
- Scorched Earth (1969 film), a Norwegian drama film
- Scorched Earth (2018 film), a Canadian sci-fi film
- "Scorched Earth", a 2000 episode of the fourth season of Stargate SG-1
- Scorched Earth (2024 film), a German crime film
- Scorched Earth (Law & Order: Special Victims Unit), a 2011 episode of Law & Order: Special Victims Unit

== Music ==
- "Scorched Earth", a song from Avatar: Music from the Motion Picture
- "Scorched Earth", a song by Van der Graaf Generator from the album Godbluff
- "Scorched Earth", a song by Marduk from the 1999 album Panzer Division Marduk

== Other ==
- Operation Scorched Earth, a Saudi military operation in the north of Yemen
- Scorched Earth, a board wargame in the Europa series by Game Designers' Workshop
- Scorched-earth defense, a form of risk arbitrage and anti-takeover strategy
- Scorching the Earth, a tactic in British Parliamentary Debating
