= Hurricane (British comics) =

British weekly boys' comic

- The cover to Hurricane, dated 4 April 1965.

Publication information
- Publisher: Fleetway Publications
- Schedule: Weekly
- Format: Ongoing series
- Genre: Action/adventure
- Publication date: 29 February 1964 – 8 May 1965
- No. of issues: 63
- Main character(s): Typhoon Tracy; Skid Solo; Hugo Dunwiddie, Sword for Hire; Harry "Hurry" Cane

Creative team
- Artist(s): Geoff Campion; Mario Capaldi; Giorgio Trevisan; John Vernon
- Editor: Jack Le Grand

Hurricane was a weekly British comics periodical published by Fleetway Publications from 29 February 1964 to 8 May 1965. The title was billed as "the companion paper to Valiant" in reference to the weekly launched by Fleetway in 1962 that had rapidly become one of the company's best-selling publications. However, while Valiant would run until 1976, Hurricane was less successful and lasted just over a year before being merged with Tiger in 1965.

== Creation ==
Amalgamated Press had been taken over by the Mirror Group in 1960, and the new owners reorganised the company's comics magazines under the banner Fleetway Publications. One of the major attractions for the Mirror Group had been AP's plethora of weekly comics with their six-figure circulations. Eager to stamp their own identity on the market, they had launched Valiant in 1962. Eschewing text stories in favour of picture strips and content based on the growing interest in World War II from young boys, it had gone on to be one of the company's most profitable publications. Looking to expand the line further, Valiant creator Jack Le Grand was assigned to create a 'companion paper' along similar lines to counter DC Thomson's successful Hornet.

Coming up with the name Hurricane, Le Grand commissioned a similar range of stories, typical of boys' comics of the era - war, sport and adventure. "Typhoon Tracy" (drawn by Mario Capaldi) echoed the format of "Captain Hurricane", featuring an oversized sailor and trouble-shooter roving the world, putting his superhuman strength to use for good causes; Tracy's low intelligence added a comic factor to proceedings. "HMS Outcast" plumbed similar territory, featuring a crew of Royal Navy misfits thrown onto an antique destroyer in World War II, while "Sword for Hire" starred another roving adventurer, the daring 'Prince of Swordsmen' Hugo Dinwiddie helping innocents during The Protectorate. Sport was represented by "Skid Solo" - featuring the title character's attempts to launch a motor racing career against the wishes of his old-fashioned Aunt Mabel - and 19th century boxing saga "Two Fists Against the World; boarding school antics were provided by tearaway Duffy as "The Worst Boy in School" and - while less popular than the previous decade - Westerns were still catered for by mysterious gunslinger Drago in "He Rides Alone". Humour was provided by the cartoon "Rod the Odd Mod", concerning the electronics-obsessed title character and his skittish friend Percy Vere, reprints of Italian Mark Twain adaptation "Un Americano alla Corte di re Artù" as "A Yankee at the Court of King Arthur" and "Just for a Laugh", featuring cartoons of reader-submitted jokes - those chosen would be rewarded with a £1 prize.

Educational content, still needed as readers were typically of an age where they required parental approval for their purchases, was provided by a back-page potted overview of a historical event. An unusual feature of Hurricane was that it did not have a front page strip - instead featuring a full-page painting, usually linked to the historical article. Like Valiant and its predecessor - the revamped version of Knockout - the comic was also notable due to the high percentage of material commissioned from European studios in Italy and Spain.

== Publishing history ==
The first issue of Hurricane was released on 23 February 1964; (Note: At the time, British industry standard was that comics featured their off-sale date, rather than the date of publication.) it would be published every Monday as was Valiant, further emphasising the link between the two, and the title debuted with cover-mounted model of the much-anticipated BAC TSR-2 jet bomber. At the time it took around five to six months for useful sales information to be collated by Fleetway, and this revealed that sales were less impressive than hoped for. As with other titles, Hurricane's market research was conducted by reader's letters - children were encouraged to write missives listing their three favourite features, and to include such information with submissions for "Just for a Laugh" or reader competitions.

Based on this information the title was heavily reconfigured at the start of July 1964. The painted front cover disappeared in favour of football strip "'Hurry' of the Hammers" (as the name hinted, modified episodes of "Roy of the Rovers" from sister title Tiger). "Two Fists Against the World" and "He Rides Alone" were dropped, while material for "A Yankee in King Arthur's Court" had run out. Coming in were science fiction yarn "The Juggernaut from Planet Z" (featuring work by Brian Lewis), war story "Paratrooper" starring Sergeant Rock (Note: Not to be confused with the DC Comics character of the same name.) and another set of reprints, with Sun's "Billy the Kid" edited to become "The Black Avenger". The revamp didn't help, and further changes at the end of September saw "HMS Outcast", "Sword for Hire" and "The Worst Boy in School" end. They were replaced by disaster story "When the Lights Went Out!" (drawn by José Ortiz), mystery "The Phantom of Cursitor's Marsh" and "Rob O' the Wood". The latter purported to be the adventures of Robin Hood's son; in fact, they were slightly modified versions of the folk hero's appearances in Thriller Picture Library. Harry "Hurry" Cane was moved to the centre pages, and the front cover featured dramatic factual piece "Danger Men", featuring exploits from the likes of Donald Campbell, the Light Brigade, Louis Blériot and William Leefe Robinson before making way for a front-page return by "Typhoon Tracy".

Further new features - Lion reprints "Brett Marlowe" and "Danger Island", and resurrected Tiger reject "Danny Jones, Time-Traveller" failed to halt the slide and the 8 May 1965 cover bore the headline "Big News For All Readers Inside". Said news was that just over a year after its launch Hurricane would be merging with the tabloid-format Tiger the following week as Tiger and Hurricane, designed partly to respond to City Magazines' TV Century 21. "Typhoon Tracy" and "Skid Solo" - the only survivors from the opening issue - made the move, as did "Paratrooper" (reconfigured as "Sergeant Rock, Special Air Service"). Hurricane's mention on the Tiger masthead was relatively enduring, lasting until 22 February 1969, four years later. Like many cancelled Fleetway titles, a Hurricane Annual was also issued for some time after the demise of the ongoing comic - the last being dated 1974.

In 1966, Fleetway would again attempt to launch a Valiant companion title with The Champion; this was even less successful, lasting just 15 weekly editions. In 2018 the rights to the original material for Hurricane were among the pre-1970 AP/Fleetway/IPC library purchased by Rebellion Developments.

== Stories ==
=== Birk 'n' Ed, the Mersey Dead-Beats ===
Published: 30 January to 8 May 1965
Artist: Gordon Hogg

The antics of two Scouse layabouts.

- Modified reprints of "The Wacks" from Wham!; later reprinted in Smash!.

=== The Black Avenger ===
Published: 4 July 1964 to 8 May 1965
Artists: Geoff Campion, Jesús Blasco, Selby Donnison

Johnny Bishop attempts to retire from gunfighting but a long parade of passing villains force him to pick up his shooting irons once again.

- Modified reprints of "Billy the Kid" from Sun.

=== Brett Marlowe ===
Published: 27 March to 1 May 1965

- Reprints from Lion.

=== Carlos of the Wild Horses ===
Published: 16 January to 8 May 1965

Young Carlos runs away from his dull life as son of a Spanish governor, joining a roaming group of wild horses.

=== Danger Island ===
Published: 27 March to 17 April 1965
Artist: Joe Colquhoun

- Reprints of "The Naval Castaways" from Lion.

=== Danny Jones, Time Traveller ===
Published: April 10 to 8 May 1965

- Continued from Tiger.

=== He Rides Alone ===
Published: 29 February to 27 June 1964
Artist: Renato Polese

Lone gunman Drago travels from town to town taking out villains.

=== HMS Outcast ===
Published: 29 February to 19 September 1965
Artists: Giorgio Trevisan, Aurelio Bevia

After causing chaos at a 1942 review of the Royal Navy's Caribbean destroyer flotilla, Lieutenant Wildeblood is promoted out of the way as the captain of the HMS Outcast. To the cheerful officer's shock the ship is a relic literally destined for the breaker's yard, and his crew consists of every substandard man in the squadron. However, Wildeblood's unconventional tactics and the well-hidden talents of the crew lead to a string of unlikely victories against the Kriegsmarine make the vessel annoyingly indispensable.

- Later continued in Tiger.

=== "Hurry" of the Hammers ===
Published: 4 July 1964 to 24 April 1965
Artist: Joe Colquhoun

After a successful trial, young striker Harry "Hurry" Cane lands a contract from giants Hammersfield Town, and soon begins to take the First Division by storm.

- Modified reprints of "Roy of the Rovers" from Tiger.

=== The Juggernaut from Planet Z ===
Published: 4 July 1964 to 31 October 1964
Artist: Brian Lewis (Note: Due to most British comics not crediting creators and incomplete records, credits may not be exhaustive.)

A spaceship lands in the Lake District and a giant, unstoppable robot emerges and begins walking in a straight line to London. Initially concerned, Dan Morgan soon becomes convinced the robot is not hostile, and struggles to convince the rest of the country it poses no threat.

- Renamed "Peril on Planet Z" from 26 September 1964.

=== Paratrooper ===
Published: 4 July 1964 to 8 May 1965
Artist: John Vernon

Veteran Sergeant Rock tells of the exploits of various members of the Parachute Regiment.

- Continued as "Sergeant Rock, Special Air Service" in Tiger.

=== The Phantom of Cursitor's Marsh ===
Published: 10 October 1964 to 23 January 1965

Georgian-era judge Jefferson sentences so many to excessive sentences at Newgate jail he becomes known as the "Red Judge of Newgate". However, his reign of terror over the locals is opposed by a mysterious horseman known only as the Phantom who emerges from Cursitor's Marsh and seemingly has supernatural powers.

- Adapted from text serial "The Phantom of Cursitor Fields", written by Alfred Edgar for The Bullseye in 1931.

=== Rob o' the Wood ===
Published: 26 September 1964 to 20 March 1965
Artists: Angel Pardo, Reg Bunn, Guido Buzzelli, Martin Salvador

Robin Hood's son travels to Sherwood Forest to take command of the still-youthful Merry Men.

- Modified versions of "Robin Hood" from Thriller Picture Library.

=== Rod the Odd Mod and 'is Pal Percy Vere ===
Published: 29 February to 20 June 1964

Rod buys a succession of expensive gadgets to impress the girl next door despite the warnings of his nervous chum Percy, who is invariably correct about the coming disaster.

- Cartoon.

=== The Shadow ===
Published: 30 January to 3 April 1965

In Regency London, seeming dim fop The Honourable Basil Blythe secretly fights underworld supremo the White Count as the Shadow.

- No relation to the famous pulp character of the same name.

=== Sir Hector the Spectre ===
Published: 17 October 1964 to 23 January 1965

With his fortunes waning, Duke Dim decides to open his ancestral home to the lucrative tourism industry. However, the ghost of his ancestor Sir Hector Dim decides otherwise, and does his best to scare visitors away.

- Cartoon.

=== Skid Solo ===
Published: 29 February 1964 to 8 May 1965
Artist: John Vernon

Edward "Skid" Solo tries to kickstart a motor-racing career by competing in races under the nose of disapproving guardian Aunt Mabel.

- Continued in Tiger.

=== Sword for Hire ===
Published: 29 February to 19 September 1964
Artist: Alberto Giolitti

Dashing swordsman Hugo Dinwiddie puts his blade at the service of any good person willing to meet his modest fee.

=== Two Fists Against the World ===
Published: 29 February to 27 June 1964
Artist: Carlos Roume

In 1904 England, orphan Jim Trim begins making his way as a bareknuckle boxer.

=== Typhoon Tracy ===
Published: 29 February 1964 to 8 May 1965
Artist: Mario Capaldi, Geoff Campion

Typhoon Tracy is a jovial 6' 6" soldier of fortune who travels the world onboard looking for excitement and adventure. On top of his towering physique he is superhumanly strong and invulnerable, attributes which can be both blessings and curses due to his general lack of common sense and caution.

- Continued in Tiger. The character later made a brief cameo in the 2000 AD series "Zenith" as part of a multiversal army of superheroes.

=== When the Lights Went Out! ===
Published: 26 September 1964 to 9 January 1965
Artist: José Ortiz

Electricity around the world inexplicably stops working, sending Earth into a savage state. Former army officer Philip Masterson ends his self-imposed exile after being unfairly cashiered and sets about restoring order to Britain.

=== The Worst Boy in the School ===
Published: 29 February to 19 September 1964
Writer: Kenneth Bulmer
Artist: Geoffrey Whittam

As a relative's will stipulates he must graduate from public school to inherit a circus, Duffy enrols in Cambourne College - and soon finds someone there doesn't want him to claim his prize.

=== A Yankee at the Court of King Arthur ===
Published: 29 February to 27 June 1964
Artist: Lino Landolfi

Ex-Marine Hank Morgan finds himself sent back to the time of King Arthur.

- Reprints of "Un Americano alla Corte di re Artù" from Il Vittorioso, itself an adaptation of A Connecticut Yankee in King Arthur's Court by Mark Twain. The original Italian version has been collected by Edizione NPE.
