= Yvonne Hutton =

English artist

- Born: Yvonne Jean Mullins; 31 October 1941
- Died: 1992 (aged 50–51)
- Known for: Comics artist
- Notable work: Roy of the Rovers

"Roy of the Rovers", from Tiger, 1972

Yvonne Hutton (née Mullins; 31 October 1941 – March 1992) was a British comics artist known for her work on the football series Roy of the Rovers.

== Biography ==
While attending Poole Art College, Hutton got work in comics through Colin Page's studio. She drew the "Roy of the Rovers" strip in Tiger from 1967 to 1975, and again in 1976–78, as well as a number of back-up strips in Roy of the Rovers weekly, including "Durrell's Palace" (1981–85), "Wayne's Wolves" (1985–86) "Kevin's Chance" (1986–87) "City" (1987–88), and "Terrible Twins" (1988–89). Her Roy of the Rovers covers were known to be "Powerful and Dynamic" during the early 70s. She also drew the Roy of the Rovers daily strip in the Daily Star and was the first artist to draw the story when it first appeared.

Hutton had a car accident in December 1991, which eventually resulted in her death three months later in March 1992. Her final Roy of the Rovers strip was published in the Star on 17 January 1992.
