= The Black Archer =

- The Black Archer on the cover of Eagle Picture Library #3

Publication information
- Publisher: IPC Magazines
- First appearance: Tiger #607 (1966)
- Created by: Eric Bradbury

In-story information
- Alter ego: Clem Macey
- Species: Human
- Partnerships: Chango; Katt

The Black Archer is a British Silver Age comic book costumed adventurer who debuted in 2 July 1966 edition of Tiger.

== Publication history ==
The character was created by Eric Bradbury and added to the Tiger line-up in 1966, and was dropped in 1967 after 66 weekly episodes. John Gillatt drew most of the character's appearances. The Black Archer also appeared in an illustrated text story in the 1968 Tiger Annual. Following the character's disappearance from the comic some of the Black Archer's adventures were reprinted in two editions of the digest format Eagle Picture Library in 1985.

In 1989 the character made a guest appearance in Grant Morrison's 2000AD strip Zenith as one of a large number of multiversal superheroes battling the Lloigor. While the character achieves little in terms of actually combating the Lloigor he is a prominent figure, frequently complaining about the chaotic nature of the battle. The Black Archer survives the events and returns to his own Earth, but not before verbally berating Lux for the high cost of what he refers to as a "pyrrhic victory".

== Fictional character biography ==
Clumsy TV reporter Clem Macey stumbles onto a warehouse while attempting to cover a robbery in the crime-infested fictional Delago City in America. There he finds the trappings of the legendary Black Archer, accompanied by a wise old man. The stranger was able to persuade Macey to take on the powers of the Black Archer to clean up the city. As the Black Archer he was reluctantly aided by a pair of minor crooks - stereotyped Asian Chango and the homunculus-like Katt. The pair reformed and worked with the Archer to stay out of prison and bickered between themselves constantly. Another recurring character was Delgado City's ineffectual Police Chief Delaney, who often blamed Macey for various misfortunes.

Enemies included hooded crime boss Axe-Man, elastic thief The Remover, The Weatherman and his henchmen Ice-Man and Tornado-Man and Chicago millionaire "Madcap" Miller.

== Powers and abilities ==
The Black Archer powers gave Macey enhanced strength and agility, though his primary power was incredible marksmanship. His signature weapon was a crossbow, for which the Archer had a range of custom bolts - such as one that could generate a smokescreen, another that would allow him to grapple up walls, an incandescent "fire bolt" and - most dramatically - the Black Wind of Fate, which caused a small tornado. His secondary weapon was a dagger that could project fire. He could switch between his everyday identity as Macey and the Black Archer at will and used the flying three-wheeled Aero-Cycle that could be rendered invisible.
