= Scorch =

Scorch may refer to:

== Entertainment ==
- Scorch, a dragon puppet character created by Ronn Lucas
  - Scorch (TV series), a 1992 CBS sitcom starring the Ronn Lucas character
- Scorch (comics), a.k.a. Aubrey Sparks, an antagonist of Superman
- Scorch (Transformers), a character in the Turbomasters line of Transformers
- Scorch Supernova, a character in the film Escape from Planet Earth
- Scorch, the discontinued mascot of the Adirondack Flames

=== Video games ===
- Scorch, a soldier equipped with a flame weapon in the Army Men series
- Scorch, a dragon character in Dungeon Siege
- Scorch, a character in The Lost Vikings 2: Norse by Norsewest
- Scorched Earth (video game), sometimes abbreviated as Scorch
- Scorch, the boss of the Evening Lake world in Spyro: Year of the Dragon
- RC-1262 "Scorch", a character in Star Wars: Republic Commando

== Science and technology ==
- Surface discoloration caused by combustion or heat
- Bacterial leaf scorch, a disease state caused mainly by a xylem-plugging bacterium
- Leaf scorch, browning of plant tissues
- In sulfur vulcanization of rubber, premature vulcanization
- Microsoft System Center Orchestrator

== Other uses ==
- Charles O. Hobaugh (born 1961), NASA astronaut with the call-sign "Scorch"
- Sibelius Scorch, a web browser plugin for the music scorewriter program Sibelius

== See also ==
- Burn (disambiguation)
- Scorched (disambiguation)
- Scorcher (disambiguation)
