= Derek Birnage =

British editor (1913–2004)

- Born: Derek Arthur William Birnage; 13 June 1913 Wandsworth, London, England
- Died: 18 January 2004 (aged 90) Burgess Hill, West Sussex, England
- Areas: Writer, Editor
- Pseudonym: Frank Winsor
- Notable works: Tiger; Roy of the Rovers

Derek Arthur William Birnage (13 June 1913 – 18 January 2004) was a British comics editor and writer and newspaper editor, best known as the founding editor of the weekly sports comic Tiger and as a writer of Roy of the Rovers.

He was born in Wandsworth, South London, on 13 June 1913, the son of Frank Birnage, editor of the conservative evangelical newspaper the Sunday Companion, and was educated at Sutton Valence School in Kent. After leaving school he joined the comics department of Amalgamated Press under Reg Eves, initially working on Schooldays. After it folded he moved to The Champion as a sub-editor under Bernard Smith, also writing Colwyn Dane, a detective strip, for the title.

During the Second World War he did his military service in the Royal Signal Corps, before acting as editor of The Champion until Smith returned. He then left to write children's stories for rival publisher Amex, but quit after only four months to run a toy shop in Bexhill with his wife, Audrey Waterman, whom he had married in 1946, and her parents. When Audrey's mother died a few years later, the shop was sold, and Birnage returned to Amalgamated Press. In 1952 he became editor of The Champion while Smith launched a new title, Lion.

In 1954 Birnage launched a new sports-themed comic, Tiger, and asked writer Frank S. Pepper to create a more realistic football strip than The Champion's Danny of the Dazzlers. The result was Roy of the Rovers, drawn by Joe Colquhoun, who later also wrote the strip under the pseudonym Stewart Colwyn. After Colquhoun left in 1959, Birnage wrote the strip himself, using the pseudonym Frank Winsor, when not ghost-writing for the credited writer, Bobby Charlton.

Birnage left Tiger, and Roy of the Rovers, in 1963, to edit comics annuals. He left comics in 1964 to edit his father's old paper, the Sunday Companion, until it closed in 1970, before returning to IPC (as the publisher was now called after a series of mergers) to work for a new football comic, Score 'n' Roar, under Sid Bicknell. He also edited Smash! and Buster before he was made redundant in 1972.

After jobs in publishing, planning, and the Department of Health and Social Security, Birnage retired to Burgess Hill, West Sussex, where he died on 18 January 2004, survived by his wife and their three children.
