= Scorched Earth (Rosen book) =

2017 book by Sue Rosen

Scorched Earth: Australia's Secret Plan for Total War
- Author: Sue Rosen
- Language: English
- Published: 2017
- Publisher: Allen & Unwin
- Publication place: Australia
- Pages: 304
- ISBN: 9781925575149

Scorched Earth: Australia's Secret Plan for Total War is a 2017 history book written by Sue Rosen. It covers secret Australian planning in response to a feared Japanese invasion of Australia during World War II.
