= Scorcher (magazine) =

Football-themed British comic magazine

- Cover of a 1974 issue

Publication information
- Publisher: IPC Magazines Ltd
- Schedule: Weekly
- Format: Ongoing series
- Genre: Sport
- Publication date: January 1970 – 5 October 1974
- No. of issues: 248
- Main character: Pete
- Editor: Dave Hunt

Scorcher was the name of a football-themed British comic magazine published by IPC between January 1970 and October 1974. Scorcher featured various well-known comic strips, such as Billy's Boots, Bobby of the Blues and Lags Eleven, a story about a prison football team. In addition, the Nipper strip was absorbed from the Score comic, and Hot Shot Hamish made its first appearance after that. Some of these stories later found homes in Roy of the Rovers and in Tiger.

IPC Magazines, the publishers of Scorcher, always referred to it as a "paper" rather than a comic in its editorials, to distinguish it from more child-oriented publications such as The Beano or The Dandy. In addition to its realistic and comedic football-themed stories, it contained factual items about British professional football, and advertisements not only for contemporary toys, games and confectionery, but also others aimed at an older readership, such as for the Charles Atlas body building method, and recruitment advertisements for the Police, the Royal Air Force and the Royal Navy.

== Publication history ==
In July 1971, Scorcher joined with another football-themed comic, Score (initially called Score 'n' Roar, launched in September 1970), to form Scorcher and SCORE, before finally merging into Tiger to become TIGER and Scorcher. The word Scorcher started with almost equal prominence to TIGER on the title page, but as usually happened with such mergers the title size was reduced in November 1975, and again in February 1978 before finally being dropped from the title of the comic after the issue dated 30 August 1980.

In total, 548 weekly comics were published with Scorcher in the title, with the following cover dates (the comic usually appeared for sale one week before its cover date, and capitalisations are as they actually appeared on the title bar of the comics):

- 77 issues of Scorcher from 10 January 1970 to 26 June 1971
- 171 issues of Scorcher and SCORE from 3 July 1971 to 5 October 1974
- 300 issues of TIGER and Scorcher from 12 October 1974 to 30 August 1980 (Industrial action prevented publication of 3 issues in December 1978 and a further 5 in May and June 1980)

14 editions of Scorcher Annual were published from 1971 to 1984, and Scorcher or Scorcher and SCORE Holiday Specials each summer from 1970 until at least 1980.

== Scorcher #1 ==
Issue No. 1 of Scorcher was dated 10 January 1970 and contained the following features and stories:

=== Picture strip stories ===
- Royal's Rangers: the story of Caxford Rangers and their manager, Ben Royal.
- Sub.: a comedy story about a perpetual reserve and his efforts to get a game.
- Kangaroo Kid: Redstone Rovers' coach breaks down in the Australian Outback after a summer tour, and they discover a boy with amazing football abilities living wild.
- Bobby of the Blues: Bobby Booth plays for Everpool City, nicknamed "The Blues" because of their colours.
- Billy's Boots: long-running story about a boy who finds a pair of antique football boots in his gran's attic which seem to make him able to play better. Although one or two of the other picture stories had some single colour in the drawings, this was the only multi-colour story, and had an excellent drawing of an old fashioned pair of football boots in the title banner.
- Paxton's Powerhouse: Vince Paxton, the ruthless soccer dictator who vowed to build a team of world-beaters, using scientific methods.
- Byrd of Paradise Hill: Richard Byrd prefers to take up a teaching post at Paradise Hill Secondary Modern School, rather than the offer of a trial for Hampton Orient reserves.
- Lags Eleven: (Humorous) Willie Smith, known to his friends as "Brilliant Genius", was the greatest super-crook in Britain, having been the mastermind behind numerous bank-raids, jewel-robberies and wage-snatches. Unfortunately for him he'd been caught and was doing a ten-year stretch in Bankhurst Prison, where he decides to start a football team as part of a master plan to escape during the first away match.
- Jimmy of City/Jack of United The Chelsey brothers play for local rivals Castleburn City and Castleburn United. Jimmy is a long-haired, impulsive striker for City. Jack is a stolid defender for United. Their adventures ran in separate strips but the plots were interlocking.

=== Prose story ===
- The Goal Thief: 16-year-old Kenny Banks is taken on as an apprentice by 2nd division Tandridge Town. Then his father breaks into the ground to steal the trophies...

=== Football features ===
- How I Began: each week the story of how a different top star got started in the game. This week: Jack Charlton.
- Roll of Honour: a team picture of the Celtic team which won the European Cup in 1967.
- Floodlight On: photographs and mini-biography of a different star each week. This week: Dave Mackay of Derby County.
- Big Match Preview: illustrated preview of a big match for the following week-end. This week: Southampton versus Everton.
- Football Club Badges: "Start your collection today". Colour illustrations of club badges. This week: Norwich; Torquay; Arbroath; Liverpool; Oldham; Rangers; Hearts; West Ham.
- Meet the Manager: front-page colour pictorial detailing the major achievements of then-current managers.

=== Other features ===
- Scorcher Team of the Week: a different schoolboy team featured each week has their team photograph published and wins a Scorcher football.
- Goal Post: Pete, "the office junior", answers readers' letters, and each one published wins £1 for the sender.
- Know-All: Know-All, "Soccer's Mister Big-Head", makes 10 statements about football and the reader has to spot where he goes wrong.
- Challenge Your Chum to quiz football: a quiz for readers to move a ball up and down the printed pitch into the goal by answering football questions.

This issue contained 32 pages, included a free-gift wallchart which allowed readers to plot their favourite team's progress in the League over the last 20 years, and cost 7d. All photographs in the first issue were black and white.

== Pete ==
The weekly editorial column was featured on the Goal Post page, subtitled Pete's Page, and under the byline of Pete was usually around 200-300 words in a jokey, friendly style, describing recent amusing or chaotic events in the Scorcher office, or upcoming features in the paper. Pete was depicted in a line drawing in early issues as a male in his 20s with a short Bobby Moore haircut, sitting at a desk with a typewriter (although on one occasion when he was unwell he was depicted sitting up in bed with his typewriter on his lap), but in later years changed to just a grinning face, with a longer Kevin Keegan hairstyle and waving a football scarf.

It was revealed over the years that Pete was a West Ham United F.C. fan who attended their matches home and away, had spent some of his youth living in South Africa, had a sister, and played football regularly as a striker for his local club, scoring 22 goals in one season, although he had previously played as a goalkeeper until conceding 6 goals in one match.

Other office characters whose antics featured regularly were Ian the Office Junior (possibly Ian Vosper, future editor of Roy of the Rovers magazine), a Portsmouth F.C. fan who played for the same club as Pete, and the paper's editor (Dave Hunt), a.k.a. the Old Man, a Tottenham Hotspur F.C. fan who was regularly portrayed as a minor tyrant who became angry if Pete didn't make him 48 cups of tea every day. Various other members of the editorial or art staff were mentioned from time to time.

Each week, Pete answered a handful of readers' questions on any aspect of football, often settling bets or other disputes over matters of football fact, and paid £1 to the reader for each letter featured. Despite all this, he often had to reassure concerned readers that he was a real person and not just an invented cover-all name for whoever's duty it was to answer the letters that week.

After joining with Tiger Pete's function was to select a dozen of the readers' best jokes to feature as cartoons on his page, and no longer answered questions.
