= Tiger (British comics) =

British weekly boys' comic

- The cover of the first issue of Tiger from 11 September 1954. Art by Joe Colquhoun.

Publication information
- Publisher: Amalgamated Press; Fleetway Publications; IPC Magazines
- Schedule: Weekly
- Format: Ongoing series
- Genre: Sports; Adventure
- Publication date: 11 September 1954 – 30 March 1985
- No. of issues: 1573
- Main character(s): Roy of the Rovers; Skid Solo; Johnny Cougar; Billy's Boots

Creative team
- Artist(s): Geoff Campion; Joe Colquhoun; John Gillatt; John Vernon
- Editor(s): Derek Birnage (1954 to 1963); David Gregory (1963 to 1969); Barrie Tomlinson (1969 to 1976); Paul Gettens (1976 to 1985)

Tiger was a weekly British comics periodical published by Amalgamated Press, Fleetway Publications and IPC Magazines from 11 September 1954 to 30 March 1985. The title was initially launched in a large tabloid size to mimic newspapers; while it featured some action-adventure stories Tiger contained a large number of sport strips. The most famous of these was "Roy of the Rovers", which debuted in the first issue and was the comic's most popular feature, eventually transferring to its own comic in 1975. Tiger would go on to become one of the company's longest-running titles, with 1,573 issues published before being merged with Eagle in 1985. Over the course of its run, Tiger featured columns by numerous famous sports figures, including Ian Botham, Geoff Boycott, Tony Greig, Trevor Francis and Charlie Nicholas.

== Creation ==
Amalgamated Press had launched Lion - their first all-new post-war boys title - in 1952, in an attempt to outgun Hulton Press' acclaimed Eagle. While it was unable to match Eagle, Lion was a sizeable success in its own right. With paper rationing having ended and a growing market, AP decided to launch another new title. Reg Eves, managing editor of AP's children's division and instigator of Lion, assigned editor Derek Birnage to create the new title, which would be primarily sports-themed, and featured larger pages closer to the size of Eagle.

Since resumption of full football competition in 1947, the game had continued to grow in profile; Eves and Birnage quickly decided a footballer would make a suitable headliner for the new comic. They contacted the experienced writer Frank S. Pepper, who had created Captain Condor for Lion two years previously and had experience writing sports stories for story paper The Champion, including football tale "Danny of the Dazzlers". Pepper devised Roy Race, a gifted young English player spotted playing for Milston Youth Club F.C. by a talent scout of Melchester Rovers and being signed to their reserves. Whereas previous football strips had featured public schoolboys, Race was a normal boy turned professional, in keeping with footballers of the period. Pepper did not have the time to commit to writing the strip beyond the first four episodes, but instead sketched out what he felt was a realistic early career outline for strip artist Joe Colquhoun. The latter would take over script duties under the pen name 'Stewart Colwyn' - not being a fan of football himself, Colquhoun frequently sought out technical advice from other AP staffers. Placed on the full colour front cover, "Roy of the Rovers" swiftly became hugely popular with readers.

Early mock-ups of the paper used the title Champion before Tiger was decided on. As well as "Roy of the Rovers", the first issue also featured racing driver Len Dyson trying to clear his name after an unwarranted jail term in George Forrest's "The Speedster from Bleakmoor", Edward Home-Gall's backwater prize-fighter "Young Hurricane" and Brian Leigh's young cyclist Rick Howland in "The Two-Wheeled Whirlwind" (initially a prose story before graduating to a picture strip in 1956). Other genres included two takes on the boys' comic perennial of school antics - strip "Dodger Caine", written by Ted Cowan and text serial "Tales of Whitestoke Hall" by John Marshall - and more standard adventure fare in "Bulldog Bryant's Amazon Adventure" and medieval archer "Will Strongbow". Feature pages included the first of series on "Thrilling Stories of Sport" and "Daring Escapes", as well as a missive from the purported blazer and club tie-clad editor, known as 'The Skipper'. Another feature was cartoon quiz "Is Knowall Right or Wrong?", in which a binocular wielding self-professed export on sports tested readers on rulebook minutiae for football, cricket, horse racing, speedway, water polo, table tennis and more.

== Publishing history ==
Priced at 3d and featuring 20 large newsprint pages, the first issue appeared on Tuesday 4 September 1954, (Note: At the time, British industry standard was that comics featured their off-sale date, rather than the date of publication.) subtitled 'The Sport and Adventure Picture Story Weekly' and brandishing a 'Space Gun Novelty' at new readers. A string-pull roaring tiger toy was included with the following week's issue. Initially the title had a stable line-up as 'The Skipper' encouraged readers to write in with their three favourite strips, and in January "Speedster from Bleakmoor" was switched out for a different motor-racing story, "Rivals of Rocky Mountain Roadrace"; other like-for-like swaps were the replacement of "Will Strongbow" with more historical adventure in "The Swordsmith's Adventure" and "Young Hurricane" with boxing legionnaire "Lightning Lorant". "Roy of the Rovers" swiftly became the title's biggest star.

=== Tiger incorporating The Champion ===
March 1955 had seen the first of six titles that would be merged into Tiger. The venerable Champion, as a story paper featuring no picture stories but only illustrated prose, was thoroughly out of fashion by this point and thus the only arrival it brought to Tiger was Pepper's pugilist pilot "Rockfist Rogan", which would continue until 1961. August saw Roy Race break into the Melchester Rovers first team (scoring twice in a 3–3 draw) as his following continued to grow - as early as 1957 the character had his own annual - while in November the first of several cases for "Police Dog Kim" appeared; the crime-sniffing hound appeared until 1959. Other notable debuts under the joint banner included long-running Ancient Rome saga "Olac the Gladiator" (drawn for a time by Don Lawrence) and 'frogmen daredevils' "Spike & Dusty".

=== Tiger and Comet ===
No sooner had The Champion been dropped from the title than Tiger was merged with another fading AP title, The Comet, from 24 October 1959. The latter had built its success during the fifties on the back of Westerns and swashbucklers but suffered when these fell out of fashion. Science fiction story "Jet-Ace Logan" was the only permanent addition from The Comet (Note: "Commando One" received a single episode to conclude the story.) Colquhoun meanwhile chose to leave "Roy of the Rovers" in 1959; Birnage himself took over writing the story (though from 1960 to 1962 it was credited to footballer Bobby Charlton as a result of an endorsement deal; the Manchester United star was however merely tapped for story ideas) while the likes of Bert Vandeput, Geoff Campion and Fred Holmes took turns on art duties.

=== Tiger ===
In May 1960 the title reverted to Tiger, and weathered the Mirror Group takeover that saw AP rearranged into Fleetway Publications. The next few years saw the introduction of the long-running wrestling character Johnny Cougar and deep-sea driver Louis Bernard. More fleeting were field athlete Paddy Ryan and World War II strip "The Suicide Six". Birnage meanwhile vacated the editor's chair in 1963, being succeeded by David Gregory. In early 1964 sales were beginning to flag, despite the ever-popular "Roy of the Rovers". In order to bring in new readers the front cover was rotated between Race's exploits and those of Olac and Cougar, but this initially saw little increase in sales.

=== Tiger and Hurricane ===
Tiger was effectively saved by a merger with the similarly struggling Hurricane in 1965. The comic was reformatted into a 40-page standard-sized weekly, while the arrival of comedy-adventure "Typhoon Tracey" and motor-racing drama "Skid Solo" also boosted circulation. While never achieving the same fame as Roy Race, Skid Solo would be a popular character with Tiger readers, running until 1982; among the strip's fans were a young Martin Brundle, who would later use 'S. Solo' as an alias when booking hotel rooms. His adventures were largely written by Fred Baker and drawn by John Vernon, and later featured Stirling Moss as a guest star. The combined Tiger and Hurricane title itself would last until February 1969. Other new stories in the sixties attempted to cash in on other fads - the vogue for spies led to the creation of "Nelson Lord, T.I.G.E.R. Agent" while the boom in superheroes that followed the Batman TV series saw a run for crimefighter "The Black Archer"; however, Tiger would always gravitate back to sports. Colquhoun meanwhile had been tempted back for two more years as "Roy of the Rovers" artist, and would also help launch "Saber, King of the Jungle" in July 1967. Paul Trevillion and then Yvonne Hutton would take over from Colquhoun on "Roy of the Rovers", and Race scored his 300th club goal in 1968.

=== Tiger and Jag ===
April 1969 saw Tiger absorb another flagging title, the short-lived Jag. The merger brought Western bio strip "Custer", World War II culture-clash actioner "MacTavish and O'Toole" and "Black Patch the Wonder Horse", as well as another football strip. Written by Tom Tully, "Football Family Robinson" was less mired in realism than "Roy of the Rovers", concerning a club whose players and staff were made up of a comically extended family. It proved popular with readers and would run until 1974, while Tully would also start writing "Roy of the Rovers" alongside it. A few months after the Jag merger, the title introduced beatnik swimmer Splash Gorton, who would cross over into Johnny Cougar's strip. The merge also saw Tiger gain a portion of Jag's high production values - the cover would be printed in photogravure, while as many as eight pages would be printed in colour.

Around this time Fleetway and recently purchased rivals Odhams Press were reorganised into IPC Magazines, leading to a takeover by Reed International in 1970. With competition from television growing, IPC management began to look at ways of boosting comic sales. They identified the clear appeal of "Roy of the Rovers" and thus Tiger soon included a second strip featuring the character in the form of prequel "Roy Race's School Days", initially drawn by Selby Donnison. Gregory meanwhile was moved across to new football magazine Shoot, his place being taken by assistant Barrie Tomlinson. Taking advantage in the massive boost in interest in sport that followed England's 1966 World Cup win, Tomlinson would strive to promote the series with numerous star contributions and photo ops (with Pelé and Peter Sellers among those persuaded to pose reading the comic). Tomlinson also strove to learn the new web offset printing method IPC were bringing in to replace letterpress, allowing Tiger to take full advantage of the advancements - including running front cover photographs of sports stars. He also initiated the Tiger Sportsperson of the Year award, voted for by readers; the first winner was tennis star Ann Jones.

=== Tiger and Scorcher ===
IPC also rapidly launched a slew of new titles, including two focused entirely on football strips - Scorcher was launched on 10 January 1970, followed by Score 'n' Roar from 19 September 1970. Neither experienced long-term success and on 26 June 1971 were merged as Scorcher and Score. This ran for some time until October 1974, when it was amalgamated with Tiger as Tiger and Scorcher, dropping the Score portion of the title. Again Tiger benefitted from some durable new arrivals, including "Billy's Boots", "Hot Shot Hamish" and "Nipper". Tomlinson meanwhile sought permission to drop the use of 'The Editor' in favour of using his own name in the hope of emulating Eagle creator Marcus Morris' relationship with his readers. He later recalled that both this and his habit of publishing photographs of office visits by various sports drew some criticism from other staff, who felt he was seeking fame; Tomlinson has argued that he was only seeking publicity for Tiger. Winner of the second Tiger Sportsperson of the Year was Gordon Banks; while delivering the trophy to the Stoke City and England goalkeeper, Tomlinson was able to persuade Banks to become a columnist for the comic. The 1971/72 award was the first of two won by champion racing driver Jackie Stewart, either side of a victory for athlete Mary Peters. Subsequent winners included long-distance runner Brendan Foster, cricketer David Steele, racing star James Hunt, athlete Sebastian Coe and footballer Peter Shilton.

The company's desire for new titles saw the loss of "Roy of the Rovers" in 1976 when Barrie Tomlinson was ordered to set the strip up in its own title. Roy Race appeared in both comics until 1978, when he was waved off to Roy of the Rovers full-time with a testimonial featuring World of Sport presenter Dickie Davies as master of ceremonies. Despite the loss of its iconic star, Tiger continued to sell steadily even as the market for boys' comics contracted going into the eighties. The successful launch of Roy of the Rovers saw Tomlinson promoted to IPC's Group Editor for Sport and Adventure in 1976, passing the baton of Tiger editor to long-serving assistant editor Paul Gettens.

=== Tiger and Speed ===
Tomlinson meanwhile would overseen the launch of new weekly Speed in 1980 but the title only lasted 31 issues before being merged with Tiger in November 1980. This brought "Death Wish" and "Topps on Two Wheels" to the comic; the former especially was a popular addition, and would outlive Tiger itself.

=== Tiger ===
While the likes of Lion and Valiant had folded in the seventies, Tiger continued as the grandee of IPC's comics. In 1981, Tiger's circulation was an average of 149,912 - around half of the 300,000 it had commanded in its heyday, but enough to make it the company's biggest seller. However, by 1982 saw it drop behind Buster, Tammy and Whizzer and Chips, losing around 25,000 readers. Among the changes made in the hope of revamping the title, Skid Solo was retired - unusually for a dropped character, his career was ended by an accident which left him in a wheelchair. This received strong reader response, leading to Gettens using his editor's letter to promise updates on the injured character, who was revealed to be regaining some mobility in a later editorial.

Sales continued to fall; by the second half of 1983 they had dipped to 96,101 - behind ten other IPC weeklies. Six months later it was down to being the company's 13th best seller, dropping below 90,000 readers;. The title returned to newsprint stock in an effort to cut costs in April 1984, but the end was now inevitable for the title and the 30 March 1985 issue announced to readers that Tiger would be absorbed into the relaunched Eagle. "Billy's Boots", "Death Wish", "Golden Boy" and "Star Raider" all continued after the merger.

== Legacy ==
Unusually for a merger, the Tiger logo had equal prominence with that of the Eagle and an equal number of strips from each comic appeared. This lasted from 6th April 1985 until 15th February 1986, at which time a smaller version of the old Tiger comic logo was placed under the main Eagle title on the mast head, finally disappearing altogether with the 21st June 1986 edition. By that time only "Death Wish" from Tiger was still running. "Golden Boy" and "Star Raider" had both come to a natural end, and "Billy's Boots" finished its storyline before being transferred to Roy of the Rovers. "Death Wish" survived until 23rd January 1988 edition of the Eagle. It was replaced by the spin-off "Ghost Squad", focusing on a group of spectres that had appeared in "Death Wish". "Ghost Squad" debuted in the first combined issue of Eagle and Battle.

Roy Race continued his own adventures in Roy of the Rovers until May 1995, while Johnny Cougar made a short-lived return as host of IPC's wrestling mag Johnny Cougar's Wrestling Monthly, an attempt to cash in on the huge popularity of WWF in 1992.

Tiger's status as the birth place of "Roy of the Rovers" has ensured it a place in British comics history. In 2012, a stamp featuring the first issue and Roy Race was among those issued by Royal Mail in honour of notable British comics. In 2018 the rights to the original material for Tiger were among the pre-1970 AP/Fleetway/IPC library purchased by Rebellion Developments. Since then the company have issued collections of some material in their Treasury of British Comics range.

== Titles ==
- Tiger - 11 September 1954 to 19 March 1955
- Tiger incorporating The Champion - 26 March 1955 to 17 October 1959
- Tiger and Comet - 24 October to 7 May 1960
- Tiger - 14 May 1960 to 8 May 1965
- Tiger and Hurricane - 15 May 1965 to 22 February 1969
- Tiger - 1 to 29 March 1969
- Tiger and Jag - 5 April 1969 to 7 September 1974
- Tiger - 14 September to 5 October 1974
- Tiger and Scorcher - 12 October 1974 to 30 August 1980
- Tiger - 6 September to 25 October 1980
- Tiger and Speed - 1 November 1980 to 12 December 1981
- Tiger - 19 December 1981 to 30 March 1985
- Eagle and Tiger - 6 April 1985 to 14 June 1986

== Spinoffs ==
- Tiger Annual (1957 to 1987, 31 issues)
- Tiger Football Special (1969 to 1970, 2 issues)
- Tiger Holiday Special (1971 to 1984, 14 issues)
