= Roy of the Rovers (comic) =

Comic magazine

Publication information
- Publisher: Fleetway
- Schedule: Weekly, then monthly
- Publication date: 25 September 1976 – 20 March 1993 as a weekly, relaunched as a monthly in September 1993 until March 1995
- No. of issues: 851 weekly and 19 monthly

Roy of the Rovers comic magazine was launched as a weekly on 25 September 1976, named after the established comic strip of the same name that first appeared as a weekly feature in the Tiger on 11 September 1954. The title ran for 851 issues, until 20 March 1993 (Note: None of the issues were numbered; the total of 853 issues is given in Duncan McAlpine's Comic Book Price Guide 1996/97 Edition.) (industrial action prevented publication of 3 issues in December 1978 and a further 5 in May and June 1980), and included other football strips and features. In February 1989, the magazine merged with the similarly themed Hot Shot, and was known for a brief time as Roy of the Rovers and Hot Shot, but reverted to its original title shortly afterwards.

The magazine was relaunched as a monthly in September 1993, but finally closed in March 1995, after a further 19 issues.

== Publication and readership ==
The magazine's circulation for the six months ending June 1981 was 122,118. A readership survey carried out in 1982 revealed that 88 per cent were male. Of the overall readership, the majority (57 per cent) were aged 11–14. Readers dropped out as they got older; only 10 per cent were aged 17–19, and none were older than 19. (Note: Of the overall readership, 9 percent were aged seven to eight, 18 per cent were aged nine to ten, 57 per cent were eleven to fourteen, 6 per cent were fifteen to sixteen, and 10 per cent were aged seventeen to nineteen.)

During its heyday in Tiger magazine it had a circulation of about 400,000. After 1976 and its own comic, circulation rose to 200,000. By 1993 sales had declined to 30,000, although the story did run on a monthly basis until 2001 in various forms.

== Regular features ==
The weekly magazine generally featured a handful of different strips, of between one and four pages in length, in addition to a letters page, hints and tips about playing football, and features on real-life players, teams and events. Roy of the Rovers was usually the lead feature, although once the cover of the magazine stopped featuring actual strips (instead using photographs of footballers, or artwork that depicted the events contained inside), it was not always the first feature in the magazine. On some occasions, too, the RotR strip would be split (usually due to where the colour pages in the comic were), both opening and closing the issue and featuring a cliffhanger at its break.

The backup strips were almost always football themed, and included:

=== Billy's Boots (1986–1992) ===
Arguably the most famous of the backup strips, Billy's Boots had appeared in Scorcher, Tiger, Valiant and Eagle before finding a home in RotR in 1986. Written by Fred Baker and drawn by John Gillatt, it told the story of Billy Dane, a hopeless schoolboy footballer who suddenly developed amazing skill and intuition whenever he wore the old boots of legendary striker "Dead Shot" Keen. The strip never dwelt at length on nor gave a definitive answer to whether or not the boots were genuinely magical, or simply gave Billy the confidence to play well (he would quite frequently lose the boots, at which point he would revert to playing poorly).

Billy was one of several characters in the comic to not age in real time, as he remained a young boy throughout the long-running storyline.

=== Hot Shot Hamish and Mighty Mouse (1979–1993) ===
Originally these were two different humorous strips, both written by Fred Baker and drawn by Julio Schiaffino.

Mighty Mouse, a Roy of the Rovers strip that began in 1979, featured Kevin "Mighty" Mouse, a successful, skilful Division One player despite being a morbidly obese, short, bespectacled medical student. Hot Shot Hamish, meanwhile, followed gentle Hebridean giant Hamish Balfour, the man with the most powerful shot in the world, and began its days in Scorcher and SCORE, before that title was merged into Tiger.

In 1985, following the closure of Tiger, Hot Shot Hamish moved over to Roy of the Rovers, and immediately introduced the characters of Hamish and Mouse to each other. Shortly afterwards, Mouse was transferred from Tottenford Rovers to join Hamish at Scottish club Princes Park, and the strip was renamed Hot Shot Hamish and Mighty Mouse. It was later shortened to Hot Shot Hamish and Mouse, and finally Hamish and Mouse. The series ran continuously from 1985 to 1990, with a brief break that year before returning. The final new stories were published in January 1992, with the remaining issues until Roy of the Rovers' cancellation taking the form of reprints.

=== Tommy's Troubles (1976–1986) ===
Another of the comic's more popular strips (after the strip ended in 1985, it was revived after just three months), this strip told the story of teenaged Tommy Barnes. Initially it centered on his bid to be allowed to form a soccer team at rugby union-playing Crowhurst School. Later, Tommy and his pal Ginger Collins formed Barnes United FC and played local league football. Two rugby playing pupils at Crowhurst, football hating Waller and Swate, became Barnes's sworn enemies after first resenting Barnes starting a football team, then, after Crowhurst switched to playing Association Football and finding they actually enjoyed the game, being ousted from playing the new sport for the school team by Barnes. The pair repeatedly used any means possible to sabotage their efforts and cause trouble for Barnes and Barnes United F.C.

Written by Fred Baker and usually drawn by Ramiro Bujeiro, the strip began in the first edition of Roy of the Rovers in 1976, finally disappearing permanently a decade later.

=== The Hard Man (1976–1985) and Dexter's Dozen (1985–1986) ===
Two strips that chronicled the career of tough-tackling centre-back Johnny "Hard Man" Dexter across three different clubs. Written by Barrie Tomlinson and usually drawn by Doug Maxted, the series began with Johnny Dexter at Danefield United, where a series of fallings-out with the club's new manager led to his departure for the Spanish club Real Granpala. There he met the fat, bald, camp but extremely successful Hungarian manager Viktor Boskovic, with the strip taking on an increasingly humorous tone in the process. The pair would later return to Danefield for a lengthy run.

In 1985, as part of a widespread revamp of Roy of the Rovers, The Hard Man transformed into Dexter's Dozen. Seen as surplus to requirements at Danefield, Dexter transferred to fourth division Burnside Athletic. Artist Mike White replaced Maxted, and the strip initially took a more serious approach. However, in later installments Viktor reappeared, and the strip took on a more humorous tone again. The series came to an end in 1986, when Dexter was transferred by Tomlinson out of his own strip to join Melchester Rovers in the main Roy of the Rovers story.

Dexter would then become one of only a handful of characters from the weekly comic to appear in the relaunched Roy of the Rovers Monthly between 1993 and 1995. He also later appeared in the Match of the Day magazine Roy of the Rovers strips between 1997 and 2001.

Dexter would also appear in the 2018 revival of Roy of the Rovers.

=== The Safest Hands In Soccer (1977–1982) and Goalkeeper (1983–1990) ===
Written by Gil Page and drawn by Osvaldo Torta, The Safest Hands in Soccer told the story of Gordon Stewart, Scottish goalkeeper for second division Tynefield City. The series came to an end in 1982.

In 1983, the same writer and artist launched Goalkeeper, with the first episode showing Gordon at the end of his career. Gordon was subsequently killed in a plane crash, and Goalkeeper focused on his teenage son Rick, who began to play for the youth team of local rivals Tynefield United, occasionally appearing for the club's first team. It was later explained in an editorial page that Gordon's adventures were retconned to have taken place in the 1960s.

Goalkeeper ran until 1990, with Rick transferring to play first for Oakhampton, and then finally ending up at his father's club Tynefield City.

Both The Safest Hands in Soccer and Goalkeeper suffered occasional scheduling issues due to the health of artist Torta, occasionally having to skip instalments or, in one instance, be substituted with a text-only story.

Gordon Stewart would later be rebooted to appear as Melchester Rovers' goalkeeper in the 2018 Roy of the Rovers revival.

=== Playmaker (1989–1992) ===
Having previously been the lead strip in the short-lived Hot Shot comic, Playmaker moved to Roy of the Rovers upon the merger of the two titles in 1989. Written by Gil Page (under the pseudonym "H. Manning") and drawn by G. Marchetti and later Barrie Mitchell, the story followed Andy Steel, a prodigious 15-year-old midfielder for Millside City in the First Division. Later strips would see him transfer to rich Second Division club Lands Park, and finally to big-name Spanish side Real Catania, along with his teammate and fellow prodigy Kevin Radnor. The final strip in 1992 saw Catania win the Spanish league, and the now 17-year-old Steel finally gaining his first call-up to the full England team.

=== Durrell's Palace and Wayne's Wolves ===
Young manager Dan Wayne was to face constant battles as manager of Western League minnows Durrell's Palace, who he became manager of in the first episode of the popular series in April 1981. Over the next few years he and veteran assistant/groundsman Joe Croke fought valiantly to keep the club in business amid a series of off-field difficulties, but enjoyed success in non-league cup competitions and even appeared at Wembley Stadium in 1984. The club folded the following year but Wayne remained in the comic in the new Wayne's Wolves story for a year. This saw him managing top-flight side Wolverdon, who were financially crippled. After bringing former Palace players Jess Barton and Duke Dancer with him and operating on a shoestring budget, Wolves defied the odds to avoid relegation and win the FA Cup.

=== The Marks Brothers ===
Running from 1980 to 1983, The Marks Brothers was one of several long-running and popular stories to appear in the comic during the 1980s. The storyline followed the fortunes of brothers Steve and Terry Marks. It began with older brother Steve playing in attack for top-flight giants Kingsbay and Terry being the star defender for struggling Fourth Division neighbours, Stockbridge Town. Terry would eventually make the switch to Kingsbay and together the brothers were UEFA Cup winners in 1981 and FA Cup winners when the storyline ended in June 1983.

=== Others ===
Other popular strips in the 1970s included Mike's Mini Men (1976–80), following Mike Dailey's Table Football adventures (the game appeared to be Subbuteo although it was not called this). Mi££ionaire Villa (1976–77) followed rich-kid David Bradley, a fanatical fan and hopeless player who had bought himself a place in the Selby Villa team for £2 million. Simon's Secret (1977–79), meanwhile, featured a young boy whose footballing abilities were enhanced by "cybernetic" implants received after a car crash. Smith and Son (1976–78) followed Barry and Danny Smith's double act at lowly Grandon Town, and The Boy Who Hated Football (1979–80) starred uninterested schoolboy John Smith, who ultimately did fall in love with the beautiful game. The Kid from Argentina (1979–81) followed Manton County's disastrous mix-up in spending big money on an unknown youngster called Jorge Porbillas from Argentina, rather than their intended target who was a famous Argentine international of the same name.

The 1980s saw a slew of popular strips run in the magazine, including The Apprentices (1983–84), a short-lived strip detailing the exploits of Melchester's apprentice professionals (effectively acting as the Melchester Rovers story in the comic as Roy was managing Walford for much of its run), and Harker's War (1985), a strip that took an unconventional angle by showing a former policeman's one-man war on football hooliganism. The mid-1980s also saw reprints of Nipper, a popular strip originally appearing in Score 'n' Roar and Scorcher and Score, that featured Nipper Lawrence, a plucky working-class teenaged orphan playing for Blackport Rovers. An older Nipper had previously shown up in the RotR strip itself, appearing in the England team that Roy Race selected during his one-match tenure as national coach. The strip also appeared in the short-lived monthly comic. There were some storylines that stretched reality in the 1980s, including The Wheelchair Wonder (1982–83), as a First Division teenage wunderkind managed to play again after a road accident despite needing to use a wheelchair most of the time, while Project 917 (1985–86) featured robot Rob Smith as a prolific goalscorer for Westhampton City. Meanwhile, Kevin Clarke progressed to Melchester Rovers after being a cocky teenager with Selbridge in Kevin's Chance (1986–87).

In addition to reprints of classic strips, a number of memorable new features began in the early 1990s. Goalmouth (1990–92) took quite a modern tone, following brilliant young goalkeeper Nick "Rapper" Hardisty, who was also part owner of the struggling Fourth Division club he played for, and who had a propensity for rapping very loudly at opponents and teammates during matches. Rapper was another player who would eventually be signed by Melchester, ending his own strip. Buster's Ghost (1992–93) was a sequel of sorts to Nipper, created by the same writer (Tom Tully) and artist (Solano Lopez) and featuring the same club, Blackport Rovers. Buster Madden had been a top-class player for the club, but was killed in a car crash, and reappeared as a ghost to aid his former teammates on the pitch in a variety of bizarre ways. His cousin Nigel Foster, also a Blackport player, was the only person who could see him (a similar story called The Footballer Who Wouldn't Stay Dead had run a decade earlier). United (1992), meanwhile, was one of a handful of strips that only enjoyed a short life due to being introduced in the dying years of the original weekly comic, and was unique among Roy Of The Rovers strips in that its fictional protagonists (a struggling Premier League side) were actually shown playing against real-life teams and players. Cheat (1992–93) saw Nick Leach continually cheat his way to the top, only to ultimately see his well-deserved comeuppance, while Future Ball (1992–93) gave an insight into how football may be in the future, played across the planets. The final new story to begin was Dream Keeper, which ran for just a few weeks in 1993.

Over the years, there were also occasional non-football strips, such as Racey's Rocket (1984–85), which was about stock-car racing, and Johnny Cougar, the story of the "redskin wrestler" which had previously run in Tiger, but these strips never seemed to fit into the football-themed comic and were invariably quickly dropped. Another spin-off was The Son of Racey (1989–90), which gave schoolboy Roy Race Jr his first prominent role in the comic just before he joined the Rovers as an apprentice.

In addition to the players mentioned above who migrated from their own strips to the main RotR strip, there were also occasional "crossovers" between strips in the weekly comic — —for instance, in an early episode of The Legend, lead character and superstar player Agostina Da Silva was shown playing against Melchester.
