= Joe Colquhoun =

British comics artist (1926–1987)

- Born: 7 November 1926 Harrow, Middlesex, England
- Died: 12 April 1987 (aged 60) Poole, Dorset, England, UK
- Areas: Penciller, Inker
- Pseudonym: Stewart Colwyn
- Notable works: Charley's War

Joe Colquhoun (7 November 1926 – 13 April 1987) was a British comics artist best known for his work on Charley's War in Battle Picture Weekly. He was also the first artist to draw Roy of the Rovers.

== Biography ==
Born in Harrow, Middlesex, Joe Colquhoun served in the Royal Navy during World War II, and won a place at Kingston School of Art on his return. His career in comics began in 1951 in Jungle Trails, and he went on to work for IPC Media on titles such as Lion, and later Tiger, where he drew Roy of the Rovers for six years, from 1954 to 1960, despite having no interest in football.

In the early 1970s he worked mainly for IPC's humour comics Buster and Cor!!, until Battle Picture Weekly came along in 1976. For Battle he drew Soldier Sharp: the Rat of the Rifles and Johnny Red before editor Dave Hunt assigned him to work on Pat Mills' First World War story Charley's War in 1978.

After Charley's War finished in 1986 Colquhoun drew for M.A.S.K. until his death from a heart attack in 1987.

== Bibliography ==
Comics work includes:

- Charley's War (with Pat Mills, in Battle, January 1979 to October 1985) collected by Titan Books as:
  - 2 June – 1 August 1916 (collects episodes 1-29, November 2004, ISBN 1-84023-627-2)
  - 1 August – 17 October 1916 (collects episodes 30–59, November 2005, ISBN 1-84023-929-8)
  - 17 October 1916 – 21 February 1917 (collects episodes 60–83, October 2006, ISBN 1-84576-270-3)
  - Blue's Story (October 2007, ISBN 1-84576-323-8)
  - Return to the Front (October 2008, ISBN 1-84576-796-9)
  - Underground and Over the Top (October 2009, ISBN 1-84576-797-7)
