= Roy of the Rovers =

British comic strip

- 1980 annual featuring title character Roy Race lifting the FA Cup
- Created by: Frank S. Pepper

Publication information
- Publisher: Fleetway; IPC
- Schedule: Weekly
- Formats: Original material for the series has been published as a strip in the comics anthology(s) Tiger and a set of ongoing series.
- Genre: Sport
- Publication date: September 1954
- Main character(s): Roy Race

Creative team
- Writer(s): Frank S. Pepper; Joe Colquhoun; Derek Birnage; Tom Tully; Ian Rimmer; Stuart Green
- Artist(s): Joe Colquhoun; Paul Trevillion; Yvonne Hutton; David Sque; Mike White; Barrie Mitchell; Tony Harding; David Jukes; Sean Longcroft; Garry Marshall
- Editor(s): Barrie Tomlinson; Ian Vosper; David Hunt

Reprints
- Collected editions
- The Best of Roy of the Rovers: The 1980s: ISBN 978-1-84576-948-2
- The Best of Roy of the Rovers: The 1970s: ISBN 978-1-84856-024-6
- The Bumper Book of Roy of the Rovers: ISBN 978-1-84576-958-1

Roy of the Rovers is a British comic strip about the life and times of a fictional footballer and later manager named Roy Race, who played for Melchester Rovers. The strip first appeared in the Tiger in 1954, before giving its name to a weekly (and later monthly) comic, published by IPC and Fleetway from 1976 until 1995, in which it was the main feature.

The weekly strip ran until 1993, following Roy's playing career until its conclusion after he lost his left foot in a helicopter crash. When the monthly comic was launched later that year the focus switched to Roy's son Rocky, who also played for Melchester. This publication was short-lived, and folded after only 19 issues. The adventures of the Race family were subsequently featured in the monthly Match of the Day football magazine, in which father and son were reunited as manager and player respectively. These strips began in 1997 and continued until the magazine's closure in May 2001. In 2018, following the acquisition of the strip's rights by comic book publisher Rebellion, a brand new rebooted Roy of the Rovers story, following the adventures of a 16-year-old Roy in the present day, began publication as a series of original graphic novels and prose novels. A “Roy of the Rovers” newspaper strip, was also published in the Today and Daily Star newspapers in the late 1980s.

Football-themed stories were a staple of British comics for boys from the 1950s onwards, and Roy of the Rovers was the most popular. The strip usually saw Rovers competing for honours at the top of the English and European game, although in some years the storylines would see the club struggle for form, including a relegation from the First Division in the early 1980s. As well as dealing in on-pitch action, Roy of the Rovers featured high drama off the pitch, with kidnapping storylines a recurring feature of its early decades. From the 1970s onwards, stories included a shooting, a terrorist atrocity, and several celebrity guest appearances. Rovers played in a fictional universe made up of invented teams; however, real-life players including Emlyn Hughes, Bob Wilson and Malcolm Macdonald made appearances in the strip, as did former England manager Alf Ramsey.

The stock media phrase "real Roy of the Rovers stuff" is occasionally used by football writers, commentators and fans when describing displays of great skill, or surprising results that go against the odds, in reference to the dramatic storylines that were the strip's trademark.

== Publication history ==
=== Tiger ===
Roy of the Rovers first appeared on 11 September 1954, as a weekly feature in the comic magazine Tiger, debuting on the front page of the first issue.

=== Self-titled weekly comic ===
After 22 years of continued popularity, the strip was judged successful enough to sustain its own weekly comic, the eponymous Roy of the Rovers, launched on 25 September 1976. The comic ran for 851 issues, until 20 March 1993, (Note: The issues were unnumbered; the total of 853 issues is given in Duncan McAlpine's Comic Book Price Guide 1996/97 Edition.) and included other football strips and features.

At the peak of the comic's success, about 450,000 copies were sold each week. There were also hardback annuals and holiday specials featuring a mix of reprinted and original content, and for a brief period, starting in 1986, Roy of the Rovers was serialised in the now-defunct Today newspaper. The strip concluded abruptly, mid-story, on 29 August 1987. These were all-new strips, focusing largely on the relationship between Roy and his wife Penny, rather than the action on the pitch. A new strip was launched in the Daily Star on 13 November 1989, written by regular writer Tom Tully and drawn by veteran Roy artist Yvonne Hutton. Hutton's final Roy of the Rovers artwork appeared on 17 January 1992, with Mike Western debuting on the art the following day. The strip concluded on 14 May 1993, two months after the cancellation of the weekly comic. Between 1988 and 1993, a Best of Roy of the Rovers monthly comic was published, reprinting older stories.

Following the closure of the weekly title in 1993, the strip appeared in a relaunched monthly publication in September that year, with grittier storylines intended to attract teen and young adult fans who had read the weekly comic in their youth. Between January 1994 and January 1995, the monthly strips were mirrored by a weekly edition in Shoot magazine, which had in the late 1980s published a parody called Ray of the Rangers. The relaunched Roy of the Rovers comic ended in 1995.

=== Match of the Day ===
The comic strip was resurrected in July 1997, printed as short (usually two-page) features in the BBC's monthly Match of the Day magazine. These strips ran until the magazine's demise in May 2001. By then the strip's wholesome tone, often espousing the virtues of fair play and strong moral character, (Note: "Roy of the Rovers taught sportsmanship, etiquette and why a fractured ankle, a broken rib and an early case of Polio should never stand between a determined team captain and victory in the FA Cup.") was beginning to seem old-fashioned. The editor of Roy of the Rovers comic, Barrie Tomlinson, has commented that "everyone seemed to be growing up a bit more quickly, and they wanted stories that were more realistic". This series ran until 2001.

=== Re-issues and collections ===
Then-rights holder Egmont published a 64-page "collectors edition" of the comic strip in April 2009, gathering together a number of 1980's era Roy of the Rovers stories in addition to other backup strips from the comic. Two Best of Roy of the Rovers books, featuring successive runs of strips from the 1980s and 1970s, were published in June 2008 and 2009 respectively.

In 2016, the rights to Roy of the Rovers and the rest of the Fleetway comics library were acquired by Rebellion Developments, who subsequently rebooted the series to follow the modern-day adventures of Roy as a teenager. A series of hardcover graphic novels began publication in 2018, written by Rob Williams and drawn by Ben Willsher, running in parallel with a series of novels for younger readers written by Tom Palmer with illustrations by Lisa Henke.

== Plot ==
The first ever appearance of a youthful Roy Race

The story followed Roy Race, a striker for the fictional football team Melchester Rovers, based in a town of the same name in an unspecified part of England, where Roy lived with his family. In the first episode, a teenaged Roy and his best friend, Blackie Gray, signed for the Rovers after being spotted playing for a youth club team. Eight months later, Roy and Blackie made their first-team debuts against Elbury Wanderers in a game that ended in a 3–3 draw, with Roy scoring twice. He soon became a star, leading the team to either the Football League title or a cup almost every season. In January 1975 he was made player-manager, a position he retained for most of the next 20 years. Although the strip followed the Rovers through nearly 40 seasons, Roy did not age at the same rate and appeared to be at most in his late thirties by the time the weekly comic ended. This unrealistic longevity was never remarked upon by the weekly comic, although the monthly comic attempted to address the anomaly by explaining that more than one Roy Race had played for Melchester over the years. (Note: The monthly stated that the Roy whose career ended in 1993 had been born in 1954 (the year the strip first appeared), and had debuted, aged 16, in the Rovers' European Cup Final win of 1970 (which had actually taken place in 1969, not 1970, in the strip). All stories before then were implied to have featured his father, also named Roy.)

Roy won a number of trophies during his career with the Rovers, including nine league titles, eight FA Cups, three League Cups, three European Cups, one UEFA Cup and four Cup Winners' Cups while also making several appearances for England. He married club secretary Penny Laine at the end of the 1975–76 season, with whom he had three children: Roy Jr. (later known as Rocky), Melinda, and Diana. Penny left Roy in the early 1980s, in a high-profile storyline that was covered on national television news. The following year Roy was shot in his office by a mystery gunman, in an incident clearly mirroring the shooting of J. R. Ewing in the hit television series Dallas the previous year. Roy lay in a coma for several weeks. The culprit was eventually revealed to be Elton Blake, an actor who had been cast as Roy in a television series about the Rovers, but who blamed him for his dismissal. In early 1983 Roy swapped Melchester Rovers for ambitious London side Walford Rovers after a fallout with the Melchester directors, but his stint away was short-lived and he was back at his spiritual home by the end of the year. In July 1986 eight members of the Rovers team were killed during a club tour of the fictional Middle Eastern country of Basran, when terrorists accidentally crashed a bomb-laden car into the team bus. Roy escaped with a dislocated shoulder. Author Mick Collins has commented that "Even as youngsters, we knew that this certainly bordered on bad taste, and probably overstepped the mark."

The cover of the 19 July 1986 issue of the comic showed the aftermath of the "massacre" of the Melchester team in the fictional country of Basran. This storyline's depiction of Middle Eastern terrorists caused controversy at the time of publication.

The final incident of Roy's playing career came in the closing pages of the last weekly issue, in March 1993, when he lost control of his helicopter and crashed into a field. Thus the weekly strip ended its 39-year unbroken run on a downbeat and unresolved cliffhanger, as Roy was taken into hospital while fans, the media and his family awaited news on his condition. The mystery of whether or not Roy had survived his crash was unresolved until the first issue of the new Roy of the Rovers Monthly in September 1993, in which readers discovered that the accident had resulted in the amputation of his famous left foot, ending his playing career and resulting in his move to Italy as the manager of Serie A side AC Monza (a fictional top-level Italian club, rather than the real club of the same name). (Note: This event may have been based on Italian racing driver Alessandro Nannini's own helicopter crash that severed his forearm and ended a blossoming Formula One career.)

Reconciling the continuity of the monthly strip with the stories that preceded and followed it presented difficulties, forcing the story's writers to alter its history in a number of ways, a technique known as retroactive continuity. Significantly, the strip rewrote various parts of Melchester's history, and shortened Roy Sr.'s recorded playing career to a more realistic level.

By the time the strip ended in March 1995 Melchester were in dire straits, on the verge of bankruptcy, and their long-term future far from certain. When the strip returned in Match of the Day magazine in May 1997, much of the monthly comic's new continuity was ignored, although the basic thread of the club having struggled against relegation and being severely in debt was continued. It was revealed in the first strip that in the intervening years, while Rovers had managed to survive the threat of bankruptcy, a bribery scandal had caused a mass exodus of players and eventual relegation to Division One. Rocky, meanwhile, was playing for fierce local rivals Melborough, after a bitter falling-out with his father over a car accident in Italy in which his mother, Penny, had been killed. Roy, who had quit football as a result, was blamed by some (including his son) for the accident, even though he had no memory of it, and the precise circumstances surrounding the event were never resolved.

Roy was persuaded to rejoin Melchester as manager and part-owner, backed by the unscrupulous Vinter brothers, and he arrived just in time to save the club from relegation. The following season, Roy and Rocky resolved their differences. Rocky rejoined Melchester, and the club was promoted back into the Premier League at the end of the year. When the magazine closed in 2001, Rovers were attempting to achieve a league placing that would secure them UEFA Champions League football, giving them financial security. Although this storyline was never resolved, there was nevertheless a certain sense of closure as, shortly beforehand, Roy Sr. had wrested full control of the club from the Vinters, thus completing his 44-year progression from player to owner.

=== 2018 revival ===
"With his clean-cut good looks, innate sense of decency and sportsmanship, and a seriously fierce shot in his locker, Roy Race was always meant to be a positive force on the football field. It is this as much as anything that has ensured the iconic comic book character's continuing popularity, almost 67 years after he first appeared on the pages of Tiger magazine."

— Phil Dawkes writing for BBC Sport in 2021 following the Roy of the Rovers reboot.

The 2018 revival series of graphic novels and younger reader novels follows 16-year-old Roy Race as he attempts to earn a trial at Melchester Rovers, a once-proud club that now sit down in League One. Roy divides his time between college and looking after his disabled father, but dreams of playing for Melchester as a striker. He impresses Melchester manager Kevin "Mighty" Mouse and coach Johnny "Hard Man" Dexter at his trial, and is signed on as a trainee – but suddenly finds himself, along with the rest of the youth team, promoted to the first team squad when the club's entire roster of professional players are sold to ensure Melchester's financial survival. The first season follows Roy and the Melchester squad as they strive to qualify for the playoffs and gain promotion to the Championship.

Along with Mouse and Dexter, several other characters from Roy of the Rovers history are repurposed for the reboot, including goalkeeper Gordon Stewart (formerly the star of backup series The Safest Hands in Soccer), club captain Vic Guthrie (a Welsh under-17 star and Roy's main rival in the series), towering central defender Lofty Peak (brought to Rovers by his friend Roy after showing his prowess playing basketball), and Roy's childhood friend William "Blackie" Gray, who joins Rovers on loan from Premier League side Islington. New characters created for the series include Roy's younger sister Roxanne, nicknamed "Rocky" (a homage to Roy's son from the original series), and Vic Guthrie's sister Ffion.

== Recurring characteristics ==
Over the years, the strip became famous for its employment of certain types of storyline and stylistic storytelling devices. For example, despite the fast-paced nature of a football match, exposition would be provided by members of the crowd apparently commenting to one another. Fans made lengthy comments in the short time it took the ball to travel through the air; as the ball was struck towards the goal a member of the crowd might be seen saying "Racey's had a shot!", followed by another responding "The 'keeper won't make it!". Nonetheless, loyal readers would usually suspend disbelief, a characteristic later parodied by Viz magazine's Billy the Fish, a fish with a human head who plays in goal for Fulchester United.

The portrayal of Rovers' successive victories [against foreign teams] mirrors British postwar views on other nations: they are unfit, tactically unaware, lacking in nerve, and only approach victory by playing under blazing sunshine, or fielding physical mutants.

Almost every year, the club was either competing for the major honours at the top of the domestic and European game, or struggling against relegation to lower divisions. Often, such spells would directly succeed one another - a Rovers team that won the European Cup one year could find itself struggling to stay in Division One the next. (Note: In the original strip, the club was only relegated to the old Division Two once, and made a hasty return the following year. In the years between the end of the 1990s monthly comic and the Match of the Day strips, the club was relegated from the Premiership to the new Division One, spending two seasons there before being promoted under Roy's guidance.)

Storylines often centred on new signings who were unable to settle easily in the Melchester team, either because they refused to change their style of play and expected the Rovers to play around them, such as the uncomprisingly tough defender Duncan McKay, or had personal characteristics that made it difficult for the other players to accept them, such as ex-circus ball juggler Sammy Spangler. As the average reader probably stayed with the comic for only three or four years, many storylines were recycled. For instance, during the first ten years of his playing career Roy was kidnapped at least five times.

When playing foreign teams, particularly in the European club competitions, the opposition would often cynically employ overt gamesmanship or downright dirty tactics. Continental sides were considered to be "sneaky":

If they went ahead, they didn't try to extend their lead, like proper footballers, but defended, like blackguards and cowards. It was, Roy always believed, something of a character defect, probably caused by the pencil-thin moustaches they wore, in order to distinguish themselves as foreign.

Roy resigns as Rovers manager live on Sky in 1992

The strip followed the structure of the football season, thus there were several months each year when the Rovers were not playing football, but the strip needed to depict something more exciting than the players going on holiday and then reporting for pre-season training. As a result, the players tended to spend their summers involved in activities such as competing in charity cricket tournaments, but by far the most common summer storyline saw the Rovers go on tour to a fictional country in an exotic part of the world, normally South America, where they would invariably be kidnapped and held to ransom. "Melchester played more pre-season games at gunpoint deep in the jungle than they ever did in more mundane settings." The summer would often also see Roy fending off lucrative offers to leave Melchester, as in 1978, when the Sheik of Basran, an oil-rich Middle-Eastern state, offered him £1 million to coach the national team.

Especially during the 1980s, real-life personalities often made appearances. Former Division One stars Bob Wilson and Emlyn Hughes were brought out of retirement to play for Melchester in 1985, along with longtime fans of the strip Martin Kemp and Steve Norman, of the pop group Spandau Ballet. Geoff Boycott served for several years as Melchester's chairman, and Sir Alf Ramsey had briefly taken over as manager of Melchester in 1982, while Roy lay in his coma. Players such as Malcolm Macdonald and Trevor Francis would sometimes line up alongside Roy in England matches, despite the fact that the clubs they played for in real life were never featured in the strip.

The concept of TV pundits and anchormen making appearances was a later development. When Roy announced his resignation as Rovers manager in 1992, he did so live on Sky Sports in front of shocked presenters Richard Keys and Andy Gray.

== Creators ==
=== Writers ===
Roy was created by the author Frank S. Pepper, who had created the similar strip, Danny of the Dazzlers, but he only wrote four installments of Roy of the Rovers because of his commitments to another of his characters, Captain Condor. Pepper's role was taken by the strip's first artist Joe Colquhoun, who used the pen-name "Stewart Colwyn". He was replaced after four-and-a-half years by Derek Birnage, the editor of Tiger, who had commissioned the strip. In 1960, in an attempt to whip up publicity, it was announced that the footballer Bobby Charlton had taken over as writer, although in reality it was still written by Birnage (who claimed that he did consult with Charlton occasionally for story ideas). The longest-serving writer of the strip was Tom Tully, who began in 1969 on an intermittent basis and then continuously from 1974 until the end of the weekly comic in 1993. Ian Rimmer became the main writer for the strip during the Match of the Day years, until the magazine's closure in May 2001. The 2018 reboot is written by Rob Williams (graphic novels) and Tom Palmer (novels).

=== Artists ===
After Joe Colquhoun departed, he was succeeded first by Paul Trevillion, then by Yvonne Hutton, who illustrated from 1967 to 1974, before David Sque took over in 1975. Despite reportedly not being a football fan, (Note: "They said, 'This is football! You're not interested in football' and I said, 'No I can draw anything.' People are people, figures are figures – just put a football shirt on them or whatever! Now of course I was sworn to secrecy and couldn't tell the Sunday papers that I didn't like football when I was doing the national footballing hero in comics! Obviously I've played it, but I'm a doer not a watcher. I loved playing football at school and in later years.") he was responsible for one of the strip's more definitive looks in its early '80s period. He was replaced in 1986 by former 2000 AD artist Mike White, who gave Roy a more muscular look and the strip a more modern feel. Barrie Mitchell took over in 1992, with a style quite similar to White's. A number of artists worked on the monthly comic, such as David Jukes, Sean Longcroft and Garry Marshall, in contrast to the lengthy tenures of the weekly strip's creative team. Tony Harding often illustrated Roy for the Roy of the Rovers annuals and also drew the Roy's Action Replay strip that appeared in All Action Monthly in the late eighties (Fleetway). Mitchell returned in 1997 as the sole artist of the Match of the Day strips for all four years.

The rebooted graphic novels that began publication in 2018 are drawn by Ben Willsher, while Lisa Henke illustrates the prose novels.

== Cultural impact ==
The phrase "Roy of the Rovers" has become a trope familiar to generations of British football fans and sports commentators, used to describe a memorable sporting achievement such as winning against the odds, or an unexpected comeback. The Guardian newspaper of 10 April 1995, for instance, described future England captain Alan Shearer as "the classic working class sporting hero ... everything legend demands an English centre-forward should be ... As a striker he comes closer to fitting the Roy of the Rovers fantasy than anyone else lately admired by English crowds". Shearer was at that time the leading goal-scorer for "unfashionable" Blackburn Rovers F.C., who were on the verge of winning the Premiership title.

Comparisons have been drawn between the fictional Roy Race and the captain of England's 1966 World Cup winning team, Bobby Moore, whose playing career spanned a similar time-scale to that of Roy's. Moore's death in 1993, just days after the last edition of the Roy of the Rovers comic was published, produced a "literature of tribute", framed around themes "remarkably similar to those at the center of the Roy Race fiction and ideology ... there was a clear sense of mourning for the loss of an age".

Reading Roy of the Rovers and reflecting on the response to the death of sporting heroes such as Bobby Moore, demonstrates how children's popular cultural experiences, and the recollections of them in later life, traverse the boundaries of, and fuse, the fictional and the real ... The world of representation in the comic strip is mobilized as an everyday trope, tapping into modes of thinking within the reality of football discourse; and in turn, football discourse draws upon the narratives, conventions, and myths of football fictions.

== Spin-offs and merchandise ==
Roy of the Rovers Annuals were produced every year from 1958 until 1994, (Note: Even before the establishment of the weekly comic, Tiger published Roy of the Rovers annuals every year from 1958 onwards. In 1958, the annual was simply known as the Roy of the Rovers Football Annual. For 1959 and 1960, the title changed to Tiger Book of Roy of the Rovers, and after that the titles would be Tiger Roy of the Rovers Annual (or slight variations thereon) until the last one in 1975, after which the Roy of the Rovers Annuals themselves would begin, to tie in with the standalone comic. The final three annuals of this iteration, however, would change their title to Roy of the Rovers Yearbook.) and again in 2000. A number of tie-in books were also published, including a handful of paperback prose storybooks in 1977 and 1993, and two football quiz books in 1978 and 1979. Roy of the Rovers never made the leap from page to screen, although he did make an appearance on the BBC comedy sports quiz They Think It's All Over in 1999, in the form of a cardboard cut-out.

A Roy of the Rovers computer game was released, on the Commodore 64, Amstrad CPC and ZX Spectrum in 1988. It was split into two parts: the first an adventure game, in which – taking the role of Roy Race – the player had to find and rescue the kidnapped Melchester team, before then playing the second part, which consisted of a charity match to raise funds for the club. The fewer players recovered before the match began, then the smaller the team who could take part. In the extreme, Roy would be the only player for Melchester. The game received mixed reactions; the Spectrum version received 7/10 from Your Sinclair, but only 3/10 from Sinclair User.

A number of official Melchester Rovers Subbuteo teams were produced in the 1980s and 1990s. There was also an officially licensed board game in the 1980s, which saw players take on the role of Roy Race and manage the club. Replica Melchester Rovers shirts have been available at various stages of the series' life, up to and including a strip designed and produced by Hummel for the 2018 reboot.

In 1990, "Roy Race" and footballer Gary Lineker released a single, "Europe United", described in the comic as "a hot rocking heavy metal rap", which failed to chart in the UK Top 40. The confectionery company McCowans produced a pineapple-flavoured "Roy of the Rovers" chew bar in the 1990s.

== Collected editions ==
On 29 February 2008 it was announced that Titan Books had acquired worldwide book publishing rights to a range of Egmont's comic strips, including Roy of the Rovers. The first of their compilations of Roy's playing days, The Best of Roy of the Rovers: The 1980s was released in May 2008 and included the "Relegation" and "Who Shot Roy" story arcs. The Bumper Book of Roy of the Rovers was published in October 2008, and reprinted strips, articles, short stories and features taken from Roy annuals dated from 1957 to 1971. Two further titles were released in 2009, The Best of the 1970s and The Second Bumper Book, and a third Best of, focusing on the World Cup, was released in 2010. All five of the titles were edited and compiled by David Leach.

The trade paperbacks:

- The Best of Roy of the Rovers: The 1980s (208 pages, June 2008, ISBN 1-84576-948-1)
- The Best of Roy of the Rovers: The 1970s (208 pages, June 2009, ISBN 1-84856-024-9)
- Roy of the Rovers: World Cup Special (208 pages, June 2010, ISBN 1-84856-671-9)

The hardcovers:

- The Bumper Book of Roy of the Rovers (112 pages, October 2008, ISBN 1-84576-958-9)
- The Second Bumper Book of Roy of the Rovers (112 pages, October 2009, ISBN 1-84856-443-0)

== Official translated editions ==
An officially licensed Bengali translation of Roy of the Rovers was announced in December 2025 by Kalpabiswa Publications. They hold the exclusive rights to translate and publish it in Bengali under contract with Rebellion Publishing Limited. Sayak Dutta Choudhury translated the comics for Kalpabiswa. The first volume of the Bengali translation was released at the 2026 International Kolkata Book Fair.

- Rovers-er Roy: Part 1 (56 pages, January 2026, ISBN 978-93-47889-02-8)
- Rovers-er Roy: Part 2 (56 pages, April 2026, ISBN 978-93-47889-59-2)
