= Shocker Toys =

American toy manufacturer

- Founded: New Jersey, U.S. (1998)
- Founder: Geoff Beckett Jr
- Headquarters: New Jersey, United States
- Key people: Geoff Beckett Jr (President); Lance Buttiglieri (CEO)

Shocker Toys was a company that manufactured limited-release toys and products based on comic book and cartoon characters, as well as original creations. Founded in 1998, the company was run by Geoff Beckett Jr., Lance Buttiglieri, and Bill Roshia and was based in Ridgewood, New Jersey.

In 2012, Beckett rebranded the company as GBJR Toys and began raising money for the company through fundraising sites. It has since come under fire for allegedly using licenses without permission and failing to deliver the product as promised. Beckett, however, has claimed that GBJR Toys is in no way associated with Shocker Toys.

== History ==
Shocker Toys was founded in 1998 in Buffalo, New York, by Geoff Beckett Jr. Beckett had previously worked in construction, and was inspired to venture into the toy industry while "playing games with his brother". The company operated primarily on the Internet, and by 2002 the company had two full-time employees: CEO Beckett and Marketing Director Dana Newsom.

Shocker Toys relocated twice prior to 2002, moving to Glen Rock, New Jersey in 2000 before relocating to Ridgewood, New Jersey. During this early period, the company's primary focus was on card games featuring characters developed by Beckett, however these card games were never brought to market. Instead, the company began to focus on developing action figures, and in 2004 they released their first product: the Shockini block figure. According to Shocker Toys, this was a significant year for the company, as it was also the year in which Shocker Toys was incorporated and Beckett was joined by Lance Buttiglieri as a new partner. Subsequent to Buttiglieri joining the company, Shocker Toys continued to develop the Shockinis line, and in 2006 displayed the figures at the American International Toy Fair.

While Shocker Toys became "best known for being plagued by delays and other problems", the company released the first series of Indie Spotlight figures and the "Mallow" line of marshmallow-themed figures in 2009. In January 2010, Dave Ryan was named Shocker Toys' first sales agent.

In May 2011, Shocker Toys was accused of nonpayment for work done for them by artist Tony Robles and then attempted to have the artist's website shut down by Robles' domain host using legal threats. During the Shocker Toys panel at the 2011 San Diego Comic-Con, court papers were served to Geoff Beckett by Jim MacQuarrie on behalf of Robles.

In late 2011, Shocker Toys announced that the company had new partners and that they had undergone a change in ownership. One of the new owners of Shocker Toys was Eric Nyenhuis, the current owner of GLOW (Gorgeous Ladies of Wrestling). Packaging mock-ups of GLOW action figures bearing the Shocker Toys logo have been shown online.

According to Geoff Beckett, he resigned from Shocker Toys in 2012 and bought the rights to sell their Indie Spotlight and Mallow figures under his new label, GBJR Toys. GBJR Toys continued to fill orders for Shocker Toys throughout the company transition. The Shocker Toys/GBJR Toys website was registered in his name in 2017, but they no longer have an active website.

== Products ==
=== Shockinis ===
Debuting in 2004, Shockinis was the company's first product to be released. Shockinis were 3 inch action figures intended for customization, with multiple points of articulation. Geoff Beckett has stated that while there are many similar toy lines – including Kubricks, Pocket Heroes, and Minimates – Shockinis, and their predecessor, Stikfas, are the only two designed specifically for customization. Beckett has differentiated Shockinis from Stikfas on the basis that Shockinis was "conceived in the USA" and were available as preassembled figures rather than as model kits. Different versions of Shockinis, including a Toxic Avenger Shockini, Kade from Arcana comics and other comic book convention exclusives were sold online, at conventions, and through a few comic book shops in limited runs of 50 to 1000 pieces. No new Shockinis have been produced since 2006.

=== Indie Spotlight ===
In 2006, Shocker Toys started work on Indie Spotlight, a line of six-inch action figures based on characters from various independent comic book series. The first series consisted of Katchoo from Terry Moore's Strangers in Paradise, Scud and Sol from Rob Schrab's Scud: The Disposable Assassin, the Maxx from Sam Kieth's series of the same name, David Mack's Kabuki and two different versions of Jim Valentino's Shadowhawk. A small figurine of an Isz was included with each figure, as well as other, character-specific accessories. Plans to include a comic book or poster packed in with each figure, similar to the packaging of Toybiz's Marvel Legends figures, were announced but later abandoned. Shocker Toys also announced a "mail away" figure of Mr. Gone from The Maxx, available to customers who purchase all seven figures in the first series. This figure has yet to be made available, however, a sculpt did appear at the 2010 Toy Fair.

Development of the Indie Spotlight series encountered several problems, among them Marvel Toys' 2007 release of their own line of action figures including independent comic book characters announced for the Shocker Toys line. Prototypes of Indie Spotlight Series 1 were displayed at the 2007 American International Toy Fair, and new versions of that series were shown at the following year's show and at San Diego Comic-Con – the latter also including Series 2 prototypes. Following numerous announced (and subsequently missed) release dates, the first series of Indie Spotlight action figures was available for purchase online as of April 2009.

In February 2011, a limited-run, preview edition of The Tick from the planned second series of Indie Spotlight figures was released, along with a "Mucus Tick" variant produced as an exclusive for the Idle Hands website. As of 2014, GBJR Toys no longer has the right to produce any further Tick-related figures.

=== Limited convention exclusives ===
Shocker Toys has produced a number of convention exclusives over the years. These include a Gwar "Beefcake" statue, a 3" Maxx vinyl figurine for San Diego Comic-Con, and a Scud statue for the New York Comic Con. Shocker Toys also released a pair of statues and a box set of five vinyl figures based on the fictional band Dethklok from the Adult Swim series Metalocalypse as San Diego Comic-Con exclusives. The box sets of vinyl figures were limited to 500 pieces and sold at the 2008 San Diego Comic-Con, the subsequent 2009 San Diego Comic-Con, and the 2009 Wizard World Chicago Comic Con.

At the 2009 New York Comic Con, Shocker Toys had planned to sell two translucent versions of their then-forthcoming Scud and Maxx figures from the Indie Spotlight line. The figures were unavailable for the event but were shipped out to customers roughly a month later, starting on March 3, 2009. A similar variant was offered at the Wizard World convention in Philadelphia that year, with a transparent Maxx incorporating painted highlights. At the 2009 San Diego Comic-Con, Shocker Toys offered figures based on their forthcoming Indie Spotlight Series 2 – a "black and white" Dick Tracy figure and a trench-coated variant. At the same event, convention exclusive Mallows also debuted, including Dr. Rockso, the Phantom, and an SDCC Guy.

Convention exclusives have also been sold through their website, and unsold figures have subsequently been made available at later conventions.

=== Mallows ===
In 2009, Shocker Toys started a new line of marshmallow-themed figures called "Mallows." Similar to Hasbro's Mighty Muggs and Kidrobot's Munny and Dunny figures, Mallows features multiple points of articulation, interchangeable parts, and are available in blank, black or white, do-it-yourself versions. Beckett had discussed creating plush versions of his Mallow line with an independent manufacturer in 2014 but it is unclear whether this plan came into being.

== Cancelled or unreleased items ==
=== Card games ===
Shocker Toys first planned products were card games featuring characters developed by Beckett. Despite promoting them online, none of the card games were brought to market. Beckett cited cost fixing by competitors as the cause.

=== Manga ===
Using characters from the unreleased card games, the company turned its attention to developing an "American Manga magazine". The magazine was never published, but the characters developed for the stories led to the company's next effort.

=== Shoulder Action Figures ===
After its attempts at manga creation and publication, the company changed direction to focus on the production of action figures. In 2002 Shocker Toys displayed prototypes of their Shoulder Action Figures, or SAFs, at the "Christmas in July" event in New York run by public relations firm Steven Style Group. In spite of early publicity for the concept, the product was never released, with Beckett citing problems arising from outsourcing as the cause. The company's attention then shifted to developing the Shockini line of action figures.

=== Mutant Mania Shockinis ===
Shocker Toys announced a line of "mutant and monster" Shockinis in October 2004, for release the following February. Aside from a Toxic Avenger Shockini which was released as a convention exclusive, no other figure from the line was released.

=== Other Licensed Shockinis ===
Shockinis based on characters from Bucky O'Hare, Gwar, 2000AD (including Judge Dredd), Metalocalypse, the Indie Spotlight line, and Who Wants to be a Superhero? were announced as early as 2005. Other than the Toxic Avenger and Kade from Arcana Comics, no other licensed properties were produced as Shockinis.

=== Gwar ===
Shocker Toys acquired the license to produce toys based on the band Gwar, releasing a 500 piece run, resin statue of the band member Beefcake as a San Diego Comic-Con exclusive in 2006. However, the announced line of articulated PVC Gwar action figures was cancelled before reaching the market. The proposed replacement line of vinyl Gwar figures was never released.

=== Metalocalypse ===
In 2007, Shocker Toys acquired a license to the characters in the fictional band Dethklok from the Adult Swim series Metalocalypse. The announced regular retail line of Metalocalypse figures was never released, although San Diego Comic-Con exclusives were sold in 2008 and again in 2009, including Dr Rockzo as a Mallow designer figure in a limited run of 500 pieces. An expansion of the Metalocalypse line was announced December 23, 2009. On January 12, 2010, it was announced that Adult Swim discontinued the Metalocalypse license with Shocker Toys.

=== Who Wants to Be a Superhero? ===
Shocker Toys also licensed the characters from the reality television series Who Wants to Be a Superhero?, including Feedback, the winner of the first season in 2006, with the well-publicized, though unrealized, aim of producing action figures based on the property.

=== Indie Spotlight Series 1 Mail Away Figure ===
The Mr. Gone mail away figure, an incentive for customers who bought all of the first series of Indie Spotlight figures released in 2009, was never released.

=== Indie Spotlight Series 2 ===
A second series of Indie Spotlight figures was announced at Toy Fair in February 2009 and then displayed at San Diego Comic-Con in July 2009. The line was announced to be available in August 2009, with a lineup of King Zombie, Dick Tracy, Ignacia, Jack Staff and The Tick. The official release date was pushed back to Q4 2009 and then again to Q1 2010. The figures, aside from a small run of The Tick, were never released.

=== Indie Spotlight Series 3 ===
A third series of Indie Spotlight figures was announced at Toy Fair in February 2010. These figures were never released.

=== Other Spotlight lines ===
In April 2008, the expansion of the Indie Spotlight line was announced to include Horror Spotlight, Anime Spotlight, Manga Spotlight, Movie Spotlight, and Gamer Spotlight. Illustrations depicting the proposed Anime Spotlight designs were displayed at the 2011 New York Toy Fair. Further announced Indie Spotlight lines from February 2010 include Golden Age Spotlight series 1 and Indie Spotlight Two Packs. These figures were never released.

=== 2010 Summer Convention Exclusives ===
Shocker Toys sold four conventions exclusive Indie Spotlight figures during the 2010 Summer Convention season: Barry Hubris, The Blank, the Blue Beetle and Hunter Rose. The figures were not released.

=== DMC SDCC Exclusive Figure and Comic ===
At the 2011 New York Toy Fair, Shocker Toys announced an exclusive figure and comic book based on DMC of Run DMC. Neither figure nor comic book was released due to a dispute.

=== American Greetings Licensed Mallows ===
Licensed Mallow offerings announced, though never released, include Madballs, My Pet Monster, and Sushi Pack figures.

=== Indieverse Comics ===
In 2010, Shocker Toys announced the Indieverse line of comics, intended to create a crossover universe for participating independent comics titles. No comics were ever released.

=== GLOW Action Figures ===
The GLOW action figures announced in 2011 were never released.
