= Recurrence =

Recurrence and recurrent may refer to:

- Disease recurrence, also called "relapse"
- Eternal recurrence, the concept that the universe is perpetually recurring
- Historic recurrence, the repetition of similar events in history
- Poincaré recurrence theorem, Henri Poincaré's theorem on dynamical systems
- Radial recurrent artery, arising from the radial artery immediately below the elbow
- Recursive definition
- Recurrent neural network, a special artificial neural network
- Recurrence period density entropy, an information-theoretic method for summarising the recurrence properties of dynamical systems
- Recurrence plot, a statistical plot that shows a pattern that re-occurs
- Recurrence relation, an equation which defines a sequence recursively
- Recurrent rotation, a term used in contemporary hit radio for frequently aired songs
- Recurrent state in Markov chains and other stochastic processes
- Recurrence, The Railway Children (band) album

== See also ==
- Feedback (disambiguation)
- Mathematical induction
- Recursion
