= List of Jack Staff characters =

Several characters from Jack Staff - clockwise from bottom: Jack Staff, the Eternal Warrior, Helen Morgan, Tom Tom the Robot Man, the Hurricane, Sgt. States, Becky Burdock. Art by Paul Grist.

The following is a list of characters from the comic book series Jack Staff.

== Iain M. Angel ==
First appearance: Jack Staff (v1) #8

An author, Angel received acclaim for his work on the comic series Dandyman. He later successfully transitions to writing novels with The Jig Saw Man, which tells the story of a serial killer who takes a different organ from eight victims. He undertakes a tour of Northern England and in each of the signing locations someone is murdered in the style of the Jig Saw Man. This is enough for DI Maveryk to arrest Angel for murder at his Castletown appearance. However, Helen Morgan realises the real killer is the disembodied entity the Word, using Angel's book as instructions to build a physical body for itself. Angel is greatly shaken by the resulting confrontation with the Word, believing that books are coming to kill him.

While the first part of Angel's name is a reference to author Iain M. Banks, the character is modeled on Neil Gaiman, and his name is an anagram of the latter's name.

== Black Warrior ==
First appearance: Jack Staff Special #1

An apocalyptic figure seen in prophetic visions by John. The Black Warrior was a powerful fighter, but when he was finally defeated there was no body inside the armour, which was then broken up to prevent his return. Subsequently various parts turned up on the black market. One of the Black Warrior's gauntlets is in the possession of Q, while the other is used by Ben Kulmer as the Claw. Kulmer later steals the Warrior's sword from the town's museum, where the Warrior's helmet is also held. The Claw later grows in influence over the conflicted Kulmer, though ultimately what connection there might be between the Warrior and Kulmer is unknown.

== Blazing Glory ==
First appearance: Jack Staff (v1) #1

In 1919, she was found as a baby in the heart of a volcano. Adopted and raised by explorer Sommerset Stone, at age 13 she develops the mutant ability to burst into flame, secreting an oil that protects her from burning; Glory is also capable of flight. She joined the Freedom Fighters during World War II, helping out in the aftermath of the Castletown Blitz in 1940. However in 1942 a trap set by Brain Head washed the protective oil from her skin, and Blazing Glory was subsequently injured by her own flame. She was subsequently taken to safety by Sgt. States, and transferred to hospital.

== Jim Bones ==
First appearance: Jack Staff (v2) #9

A sadistic bogeyman, he imprisoned Lord Nod and terrorised the Land of Dreams before the young Zipper stopped him by freeing Lord Nod. However, he later manifested in Castletown.

== Brain Head ==
First appearance: Jack Staff (v2) #6

A highly intelligent, arrogant, and misanthropic dwarf, Brain Head moved to villainy due to the scientific community's rejection of both his work and his diminutive appearance. He clashed with Jack Staff on several occasions before striking an alliance with the Nazis, who offered him revenge and possession of Kapitan Krieg's body if he used his teleporter to bring German troops directly to Castletown. Krieg however turned on him, and Jack Staff was able to destroy the machine. Brain Head disappeared along with the machine, his home and Krieg, and has not been seen since.

Jack Staff twice addresses the character as 'Brian', suggesting this is part of Brain Head's true identity.

== Bramble & Son ==
Rag-and-bone men by day and dubiously competent vampire hunters by night, they have repeatedly run into Becky Burdock in their fight against the undead. They do however maintain a considerable library of rare books on the subject of vampirism.

The characters were heavily based on the leads in the British sitcom Steptoe and Son, even retaining the same given names and characterisations.

=== Albert Bramble ===
First appearance: Jack Staff (v1) #1

Albert Bramble first encountered vampires during the Castletown Blitz when he was seven years old; after being rescued from a bomb site by Sgt. States, he discovered his mother was dead from unknown means. Trying to find out what happened, he witnessed the battle between Templar Richards and the Freedom Fighters, saving Jack Staff's life.

Now a crotchety old man, Albert has raised his son Harold to also hunt vampires — "the family trade". He is generally slovenly and unkempt, and frequently puts down his son's attempts to romance Becky Burdock even after it becomes clear her vampirism is no danger. He experiences spasms he refers to as "the oogly moogly". Albert warns Harold of making the same mistakes he did; he appears to have previously enjoyed a liaison with a vampire called Ruth, who may even have been Harold's mother.

In a parallel reality, Albert was a vampire himself. Despite the efforts of Rocky Reality to mend the timeline this version was transported to the regular universe, and battled the human Alfred, besting him in combat and leaving him for dead. The Man of Shadow was able to revive Albert, and the two versions were then merged by Rocky.

=== Harold Bramble ===
First appearance: Jack Staff (v1) #3

Harold would prefer to have a normal life and clashes with his father over the business, especially over their finances; it is a sore point that their daily trade which funds vampire hunting is "the only job that pays less than vampire hunting". He has an infatuation with Becky Burdock, something that causes clashes between him and his father, and dislikes the Man of Shadows for his interest in Becky.

== Becky Burdock ==
First appearance: Jack Staff (v1) #1

As a toddler in Castletown in 1981, Becky was caught up in a battle between Jack Staff and the Hurricane, though she has no memory of the events.

By age 23, Becky becomes a cynical and easily irritated journalist for the sleazy tabloid The World's Press; she is often frustrated with this position, and the poor ethics of her editor Gerald Skinner. She does not speak with her mother often. While researching the disappearance of Jack Staff and the recent vampire murders around Castletown, she was attacked by Sgt. States and transformed into a vampire. Somehow maintaining her mind, she tries to continue her life as if nothing happened - despite her vampiric nature becoming public knowledge - and tries not to get involved in Jack Staff's weird world, but is constantly being drawn into superhero situations anyway.

It was eventually revealed that Becky is the Green's chosen champion, meant to wield the Sword of Devastation in the battle at the end of the world. She is strong enough to resist the control of the Mask of Destiny, facing off the Destroyer without it.

== The Butler ==
First appearance: Jack Staff (v2) #17

A well-mannered masked vigilante who appears out of nowhere to aid Jack Staff against Shock!, armed with a serving tray and a bottle of sparkling mineral water. and slips away after the villain is defeated. He reappears under similar circumstances when the Claw attempts to steal a necklace from the museum and is confronted by Jack Staff. After the latter is taken out of time by Calendar Girl the Butler is knocked unconscious. Who or what the Butler is was ultimately unrevealed.

== Calendar Girl ==
First appearance: Jack Staff (v1) #10

Lynda Jones is a glamour model and local celebrity in Castletown. Her pinup calendars are popular sellers, with John Smith and Alfred Chinard among their audience. The World's Press enlists her for their gaudy coverage of the opening of Raven's casket, where she flirts with John Smith and talks almost entirely in innuendo.

Later she dates Smith - and later reveals that she is also Calendar Girl, a time agent known as a Clock Cop charged with keeping the correct timestream unfolding. To combat a time flux point, she uses a handheld Time Hopper to take him forward in time to observe the Destroyer. While broadly successful, her actions cause Smith to lose three weeks of his life and denounce her for the human cost of her machinations.

== The Claw ==
First appearance: Jack Staff (v1) #1

Karl Stringer was an amoral small-time thief, who has hired to steal a mystical glove from Gravett Museum by the sinister Mason. During the theft, the glove bonded with him - giving him the power to turn invisible (except for the glove) and deliver electric shocks. As a result he did not hand the glove over to Mason and instead became the criminal known as The Claw. He was eventually apprehended by the police but was instead recruited into Q by Helen and given the new identity Ben Kulmer. In order to cover up his past, he killed fellow criminal Alex when the latter attempted to blackmail him, as well as killing Mason when the latter tracked him down to take possession of the Claw.

Despite nominally fighting on the side of good with Q, Kulmer continues to commit thefts in his spare time for reasons that are unclear to even himself, and occasionally wrestles with his conscience about which side he is really on, and how much influence the Claw - revealed to be part of the armour of the fearsome Black Warrior - has over him.

The Claw aspect of the character is based on Fleetway Publications' The Steel Claw, though the origins of the characters' powers is markedly different. Grist noted that 'Ben Kulmer' is a deliberate Spoonerism of Steel Claw co-creator Ken Bulmer.

== Costello Academy students ==
A trio of Costello Academy pupils have superpowers. They use their powers to their own ends, carrying out a series of armed robberies in Castledown.

- Lusion: a boy capable of projecting convincing illusions, and the ring-leader of the trio.
- Morph: a girl with shapeshifting abilities who carries out the robberies, but later helps John clear his name for robbery.
- Flash: after Maveryk asks her if her power is being able to run fast, she reveals her ability is being able to generate blinding flashes of light, allowing the trio to escape.

== Harry Crane ==
First appearance: Jack Staff (v1) #1

A quiet and principled psychic who sees echoes of past events, Crane was originally a policeman and partner to Maveryk. He hid his abilities until an encounter with Helen Morgan and the Twisted Mirror, which saw him drafted into Q. He sees the best in everyone, and is troubled by having to see visions of murders that nobody stopped and that he can't intervene in; he used to be religious but the visions have caused him to "[not] remember what God looks like anymore." Crane "used to be" a husband and father, and it is unknown what happened to his family. After serving for seven years with Q, Crane attempted to quit after the apparent death of Helen - only to be visited by a resurrected Helen and persuaded to stay.

== "The Destroyer" ==
First appearance: Jack Staff Special #1

An unnamed, powerful villain also referred to as the "Devil with an Angel's Face", prophesied to gain control of the Valiant Stone before destroying Castletown and become an even greater threat than the Black Warrior. Calendar Girl takes Jack Staff to the future to witness these events, but the man attacks them and follows them back to the present before being seen off by Becky.

== Doc Tempest ==
First appearance: Jack Staff (v1) #5

Able to control the weather, Tempest fought the Four Good Guys but was defeated. After they disappear he attacks Castletown but was defeated by Tom Tom. Following the latter's battle with Sgt. States, Tempest is able to deduce that Trisha was controlling Tom Tom. Baulking at being defeated by a disabled 12-year old girl he disguises himself as a doctor and takes her to the roof of Castletown Royal Infirmary, planning to push her off. Trish is able to get loose and when Tempest attempts to kill her with his powers a blast of wind causes her wheelchair to crash into the villain, leaving him paralysed - apart from his tongue.

== Doctor Spex ==
First appearance: Jack Staff (v1) #10

The "Man with the X-Ray Eyes", Doctor Spex dresses like a comic character and wears a pair of x-ray goggles, but does not seem to be either a hero or a villain. He is a special guest at the World's Press unveiling of Charlie Raven's casket but as it is lined with lead he is unable to see inside. His goggles do allow him to see the Claw when the latter tries to steal the prize money, but unfortunately for Spex the Claw jabs him in the eyes, wrecking the goggles.

== The Druid ==
First appearance: Jack Staff (v1) #5

A mysterious magical figure, the Druid can see across all realities — including past the fourth wall. His adventures were printed in British boys' comic Brilliant; they were read avidly by a young Zipper Nolan and Druid appeared to help the boy awaken Lord Nod.

The Druid is able to defeat the Word but later an unknown entity stripped him of his ability to see across realities and trapped him in Castletown's Abbey Psychiatric Hospital. He escaped, gained his cloak and made contact with Zipper Nolan, who dismissed him as another of his childhood imaginary friends — the discovery he is also a fictional comic character caused Druid to scream "I have failed! The world is lost!". Nevertheless he happily plays cards and orders pizza with the rest of Zipper's gang.

== The Eternal Warrior ==
First appearance: Jack Staff (v1) #12

A taciturn cosmic champion armed with a sword, the Eternal Warrior has unknown abilities, though he can travel through time and space at will, and survives being shot with arrows. Around the end of the first millennium he travelled to Earth, decapitating Molachi the Immortal. A thousand years later he travelled to Castletown in preparation for the arrival of Vorty Krill. However due to a misunderstanding stoked by Morlyn the Mystic, the Eternal Warrior was engaged by Jack Staff and knocked out. He revived in time to play a pivotal role in the battle with the demon.

The character is based on the Fleetway Publications character Adam Eterno.

== The Four Good Guys ==
A group of heroes who resided in Castletown, and defeated Doctor Tempest on at least one occasion. They occasionally worked with Jack Staff but were no longer active by the time he returned to duty. Their high-tech headquarters subsequently taken over by Trisha and used as a base for her activities as Tom Tom.

== The Freedom Fighters ==
A team of World War II heroes fighting on the side of the Allies, with Jack Staff, Sgt. States, Blazing Glory and Tommy Twister as members. The team were involved in the clean-up after the Castletown Blitz in August 1940, and later fought against a planned Nazi invasion of the town planned by Brain Head and Kapitan Krieg. The latter event saw both Blazing Glory and Tommy Twister incapacitated.

The team are loosely based on Marvel Comics' Invaders. When asked what happened to Tommy Twister and Blazing Glory after that battle, Paul Grist said "Nothing good, I'm afraid."

== General Tubbs ==
First appearance: Jack Staff (v2) #3

A non-verbal autistic teenage boy recruited by Project H to work for the British military, capable of controlling a fleet of toy-sized tanks and jets. Despite using a remote to apparently control the machines he actually controls them with his mind. Malone deployed him to bring the Hurricane under control during the attack on Castletown, though Tubbs was pushed far beyond his limits.

The character is based on the DC Thomson character General Jumbo.

== Commander Hawkes ==
First appearance: Jack Staff (v1) #6

Commander Hawkes led Unit D during their heyday, entering combat with a large powered glove as a weapon. After Unit D was shut down he retained the Thunder Ship and continued to patrol Castletown's skies. He partly blames Jack Staff for Unit D's failures, believing the hero let him down, but nevertheless aids him during crises.

== The Head Master ==
First appearance: Jack Staff (v2) #19

Founder of the prestigious Costello Academy private school, Edward Costello is a powerful telepath who plans to use his mind control abilities to turn his pupils into an army. However, he is foiled when he attempts to take control of Zipper Nolan, instead being rendered insensible by what he discovers there.

== The Hurricane ==
First appearance: Jack Staff (v2) #1

A British army office, Colonel Gust was prone to bouts of extreme rage which gave him ferocious strength. This culminated in a furious rampage that seriously injured numerous French troops; unfortunately for Gust, Britain was not at war with France at the time. This brought him to the attention of Project H, who found a way to fuel his anger, giving him even more enhanced strength, turning him into a superweapon codenamed the Hurricane. Nine months later, the Hurricane was released by Mister Green and set on Castletown to test his potential as an ally. After considerable effort his power was drained by Jack Staff. The rampage was covered up, and the seemingly normal Gust lived as an amnesiac vagrant in Castletown.

However his anger returned and instead seeped into the people of Castletown some twenty years later. Helen Morgan eventually worked out Gust was the source of the anger and channelled it back into Gust, who then she calmed and subsequently recruited as an ally for Q.

Gust is based on Fleetway Publications' Captain Hurricane, who had innate super-strength but was prone to "ragin' furies".

== Jack Staff ==
First appearance: Jack Staff (v1) #1

Castletown woodworker John Smith was granted powers in 1875 by illusionist Mister Fate, who imbues him with power from a strange cabinet on stage to create a champion. This gives him energy abilities, allowing him to transfer energy in or out of objects Smith subsequently took on the identity of Jack Staff and became known as Britain's Greatest Hero, fighting with a wooden staff that he is capable of using to channel his powers. He also gains incredible longevity, having not visibly aged since 1875.

In World War II he fought as part of the allied super-team the Freedom Fighters, notably helping to frustrate a German invasion of his hometown led by old enemy Brain Head. Following the war he worked with Unit D to fight crime, including saving Castletown from the Skull. Later he worked for the Green, but after the Hurricane was unleashed on Castletown in 1981 Jack grew tired of fighting other people's battles and retired.

Smith instead focused on his building business in Castletown, undertaking a modest living, with Jack Staff's disappearance largely unnoticed. However, some twenty years later Jack Staff returned, initially to investigate an apparent return of old enemy Templar Richard. Following this a series of events keep him in the centre of a growing number of unusual events in Castledown. While he is always ready to battle any threat to the innocent, his success record is variable. He is eventually found not to be the champion Fate expected, merely being destined to protect Becky, the real champion.

Jack Staff is based on the Marvel Comics character Union Jack, particularly the Joe Chapman incarnation.

== Kapitan Krieg ==
First appearance: Jack Staff (v2) #6

Formerly a teacher, the patriotic Hans Gruber became Kapitan Krieg in World War II. His indestructible skin allowed him to battle Jack Staff on several occasions, though the pair were too evenly matched for either to emerge victorious. An intelligent and honourable man, Gruber became disaffected as he realised the inhumanity of his Nazi superiors. He learnt his body would be effectively used as an incubator for the demon Morty Krill and in revenge sabotaged Nazi ally Brain Head's teleporter, forestalling a planned German invasion of Castletown in 1942. As a result he disappeared along with Brain Head's machine and home.

Krieg and the building reappeared in the present day outside the Castletown branch of Tesco, with Krill nearly in complete control. However, the combined efforts of Gruber's resistance, Jack Staff, the Eternal Warrior and Morlyn were able to defeat the demon. Gruber's body was later buried by John Smith.

== Lord Nod ==
First appearance: Jack Staff (v2) #7

The ruler of the land of dreams. He appears to Helen Morgan and - as a child - Zipper Nolan, who frees him from Jim Bones with the help of the Druid and his Gang.

== Malone ==
First appearance: Jack Staff (v2) #1

Malone was the amoral commander of Project H. Following the Hurricane's escape in 1981 Malone was more concerned with covering up his own role than reducing casualties and damage. As a result he escalated the situation by deploying another asset, General Tubbs. When this failed to help he pulled a gun on subordinate Colonel Stewart and attempted to seize Tubbs' army for himself, unaware the boy controlled his miniature armada with his mind. He narrowly escaped death at the hands of the Hurricane thanks to the intervention of Jack Staff, reacting with ingratitude.

Malone is named for Captain Hurricane's batman Malone, and is even called "maggot" by Gust at one point in reference to the Captain's nickname for his comrade in the Valiant comic.

== The Man of Shadows ==
First appearance: Jack Staff (v1) #1

A sinister figure with a long-standing interest in Becky Burdock (even haunting her childhood nightmares), the Man of Shadows can inhabit various shadows undetected. He can choose to extend this power to cloak others but does have some physical form, being accosted by Harold Bramble. At one point he engages the Hounds of Hell to track Becky, though their efforts are hindered by the pair's squabbling. Becky refuses to join his cause but is forced to call on him to save the life of Harold from a vampire-worshipping cult, and later to save the Brambles from Albert's vampiric doppelganger. As a result she is in his debt.

== Mason ==
First appearance: Jack Staff (v1) #11

The rich, humourless Mason collects unusual artefacts. To this end he hires thief Karl Stringer to steal one of the Black Warrior's gloves, but Stringer instead keeps it for himself. Mason begins hunting him down - thanks to Q's efforts to erase Stringer's past this process takes five years, though Mason is eventually able to track him to Castletown, where he has taken on the identity of Ben Kulmer. Mason is able to capture Kulmer but thanks to the Claw the latter is able to get free, and snaps Mason's neck.

Mason delegates much of his work to a silent, unnamed female assassin, nicknamed 'Pink' by Kulmer due to her attire. At his behest, she seemingly kills Sommerset Stone, but is later disabled by an electric shock from the Claw.

== D.I. Maveryk ==
First appearance: Jack Staff (v1) #2

A self-described "old-fashioned copper", the belligerent Detective Inspector Maveryk has a low tolerance for anything strange or supernatural, and yet is always being drawn into the adventures of Jack Staff and Q. As a young constable he was on security duty when the criminal Spider stole an emerald cat statue. As a detective, Maveryk tries to dogmatically solve crimes by old-fashioned means (often by shouting) and in one case deliberately destroyed evidence showing Jack Staff was framed in order to "keep things simple" and go with a gut instinct. Maveryk bemoans that Castletown no longer faces old-fashioned crimes, and often attempts to make more normal interpretations of unusual crimes to keep Q out of his business. He heavily dislikes Helen Morgan (who represents everything that offends his traditional outlook), Jack Staff (due to being a superhero who complicates his work ) and also resents former partner Harry Crane's decision to join Q.

== Mister Green ==
First appearance: Jack Staff (v2) #2

A powerful being only concerned with a forthcoming war with the 'Red', and either can not or will not intervene in other affairs. To this end he attempts to recruit various agents. At one point Jack Staff is the Green's champion, but he refuses to work with Mister Green after the latter unleashes the Hurricane on Castletown to see if he was a worthy ally.

Instead he focuses on Helen Morgan as his catspaw, charging her with collecting all of the fragments of the Valiant Stone. As such Q act as agents for the Green.

== Mister Punch ==
First appearance: Jack Staff (v2) #14

A minor villain who models himself on the puppet of the same name, who periodically threatens Castletown and is given to prefacing his actions with video warnings. Nolan is dismissive of Punch, considering him a bargain basement Joker. He inadvertently teleports into the restaurant Tuppers instead of a bank, and is attacked by Jack Staff. However, he is instead defeated by Zipper Nolan and his gang but later disappears from police custody.

== Molachi the Immortal ==
First appearance: Jack Staff Special #1

Hired by the Nagarik aliens to recover various elements needed for a planned invasion of Earth, Molachi is thwarted when the Eternal Warrior beheaded him before he can take possession of the Star Stone. However, this does not kill Molachi - his head grows a tiny body (for which he builds a full-size mechanical body) and his body grows a tiny head. A thousand years later he resurfaces and steals the Star Stone from Castletown's museum, despite the attempts of Jack, Becky and Kulmer to stop him. However, he finds that in the intervening millennia Nagarik have lost interest in invading Earth.

== Helen Morgan ==
First appearance: Jack Staff (v1) #1

An enigmatic Welsh woman and senior member of Q, few of her colleagues know anything about her. Helen has magical–psychic abilities - including precognition, mind control, psychic projections and the ability to halt time. Due to possessing a shard of the Valiant Stone, she returns from the dead every time she is killed. She is a direct agent of Mister Green and can only escape immortality if she collects all the shards of the Valiant Stone. Helen privately loathes being immortal and a pawn of the Green. As a result of the actions she undertakes for the Green she frequently clashes with both Jack Staff and DI Maveryk.

The character is named for former Miss World winner Helen Elizabeth Morgan.

== Morlun the Mystic ==
First appearance: Jack Staff (v1) #10

The horoscope writer for The World's Press, Morlyn is actually a genuinely powerful mage and precog, though he admits fine-tuning his predictions is tricky. He implies his horoscopes are exclusively aimed at Becky, and prefers to be addressed as Al. He later gives Jack Staff cryptic warnings about the forthcoming arrival of Morty Krill. While these are seemingly unhelpful, they end up directing the battle to the point where Morlun is able to simply eat Krill between hosts.

The character is based on renowned British comic writer Alan Moore, both visually and in reference to Moore's much-publicised personal interest in magic.

== Morty Krill ==
First appearance: Jack Staff (v2) #12

A powerful demon the Nazis attempt to manifest in the body of Kapitan Krieg, a plan forestalled by Krieg himself in 1942. His efforts however simply move them forward 60 years in time, and in almost complete possession of Krieg, Krill fights Jack Staff in a supermarket car park - declaring himself ruler of Tesco. He attempts to take possession of the Eternal Warrior but is forced out by the cosmic champion, and is eaten by Morlun before he can take another host.

== D.S. 'Zipper' Nolan ==
First appearance: Jack Staff (v1) #7

Maveryk's latest partner, Detective Sergeant Nolan is a more laid-back character with an interest in comics and fantasy fiction. When he was a small child, Nolan had an abusive father. The boy was recruited by the Druid and a gang of dream beings — Mister Balloons, Dish and Spoon, and Goldie (a goldfish) — to help liberate the Land of Nod from the bogeyman Jim Bones, using his small size and speed to "zip" into Nod's castle and wake him. Zipper and his gang went on to have many adventures throughout his childhood.

These friends seemingly manifested again in his adult life, and began aiding him in various situations before moving into his house, as does the Druid.

Nolan accidentally wandered into Q's arsenal in Jack Staff (v2) #6; Paul Grist has hinted that this is a sign that something is unusual about Nolan. Nolan is named for the Fleetway Publications character Zip Nolan, though aside from being police officers the two share no similarity.

== Lord Gilbert Pearce ==
First appearance: Jack Staff (v2) #8

Successful in many disciplines - Olympic boxing champion, author, member of parliament - Pearce is a resident of Castletown when a murder takes place at his home. He uses his talent for disguise to escape the crime scene, taking Maveryk captive and proclaiming his innocence. Tom Tom rescues Maveryk but Pearce is able to slip away and use his skills to hide in plain sight as one of Castletown's homeless.

== Professor Fate ==
First appearance: The Weird World of Jack Staff #1

Possessed by the Mask of Destiny, Professor Fate wants to take control of the Sword of Destiny and thus needed to find the champion destined to wield the blade. To this end he undertakes a career in music hall, using his psychic abilities both as an act and to screen the population. During a 1875 engagement at the Castletown Empire Theatre his plans were discovered by Charlie Raven, but Fate is able to overpower and trap his rival. On stage he picks builder John Smith out of the audience and uses his Casket of Transformation to activate his powers, which he then tries to take for himself - only to realise Smith isn't the prophesied champion. One of the traps Fate left for Raven starts a fire, and the escapologist is able to prevent Fate leaving before the theatre collapses.

Fate reappears in present day in the restored Castletown Empire but is immediately trapped again when the freshly renovated building is caught in a battle between Tom Tom and the Skull. A builder named Andrew Owen is also buried aliveand the Mask of Destiny transfers to him before he is taken to hospital. The Mask subsequently reanimates Owen and uses him to get close to the real champion, Becky. However, while Becky briefly dons the Mask she is able to reject its control.

== Q ==
First appearance: Jack Staff (v1) #1

Investigators of the unexplainable and dealing in "question mark crimes". Q are officially a special branch of the police and operate out a basement room in Castletown's police station. Unofficially, they are primary agents of the Green, and their operatives wear green coats. Their headquarters contains numerous relics from their cases, including Mister Green's cloak and shards of the Valiant Stone, and is seemingly not bound by the laws of physics. Helen Morgan describes the room as an arsenal — Paul Grist has stated the arsenal "doesn't belong to Q."

== Charlie Raven ==
First appearance: Jack Staff (v1) #8

A talented Victorian escapologist, despite his arrogance and selfishness Raven has a parallel career as a heroic adventurer, much to the irritation of some of the authorities. His stunts included being chained in a cage with a Siberian tiger and being suspended over the Thames with a burning rope. In 1875 he clashed with Professor Fate, seemingly a rival music hall act but actually under the control of the Mask of Destiny. He used his talents to escape a trap set at the subsequent fire at the Castletown Empire, seemingly dooming Fate in the process.

Two years later his reputation brought him to the attention of the Time Leech, which had taken the form of a beautiful woman in Victorian high society. She feels he is more than human, and after killing his assistant Dawson offers him an alliance to conquer the world. Raven refuses, and despite her fascination with him the Time Leech poisons him and has him buried in a casket after a show in Castletown.

Using ancient techniques to slow his breathing and his heartbeat, Raven survives until his casket is recovered by John Smith's building firm. The casket is subsequently unveiled at a promotional event by The World's Press, culminating in the aged but still dynamic Raven reviving. He is placed at Abbey Psychiatric Hospital but escapes and gets to Becky Burdock. Despite her initial scepticism he is able to convince her of the truth and the Time Leech us subsequently defeated.

Raven is based on the Fleetway Publications character Janus Stark.

== Rocky Reality ==
First appearance: Jack Staff (v2) #13

A Temporal Reality Agent and chimpanzee, Rocky is tasked to ensure reality remains the way it is supposed to and fix any changes to it. He works outside of reality, and his own theme song ("when reality's out of whack, Rocky Reality whacks it back!"). He corrects an alternate version of the universe to its correct course after it is warped by the Twisted Stone, and later returns to deal with the escaped vampire version of Albert Bramble.

== Ruth ==
First appearance: Image! #8

A vampire who had a tryst with Albert Bramble, which possibly led to the birth of Harold. Many years later she attempts to set up a social network for vampires in Castletown, much to Becky's delight. However due to a misunderstanding her home is stormed by Jack Staff and the Brambles, who cause considerable damage before Becky can explain the situation.

== Sgt. States ==
First appearance: Jack Staff (v1) #1

"America's Fighting Footsoldier", the superhuman Nathan Hart served in the Freedom Fighters before America joined the war. While pleasant and heroic on the surface, deep down he believed the others were looking down at him. In August 1940, he was transformed into a vampire by Templar Richard and allowed his bitterness and the growing darkness within him to eventually consume him, though he managed to keep his transformation a secret from the other Fighters. His nature was however known to the government who covered it up, replacing his Star-Spangled Kid sidekicks every time he ate one.

After the war, his death was faked and he was regularly dispatched to war zones to carry out America's interests; occasionally he would escape for some fresh blood and would be apprehended by American special forces. He took up a public role once more, with a cover story of having been frozen in ice for several decades, and was sent on a world tour blood drive. Escaping his handlers, Sgt. States deliberately attacked Castletown in order to draw out Jack Staff and have petty revenge on him for imagined slights. He was defeated but was recovered by the US government, who again covered up the incident and returned him to service.

The character is based on Marvel Comics' Captain America.

== Shock! ==
First appearance: Jack Staff (v2) #1

A local supervillain in Castletown who clashes with Tom Tom on several occasions. Trish describes him as more of a mischief maker than an outright villain. When she is possessed by the Hurricane during a battle with Shock!, Tom Tom hospitalises the rogue. He subsequently becomes a vessel for the Hurricane until Helen Morgan was able to channel it back into Gust - shortly before Liz Stewart used Commander Hawkes' glove to disable Shock!

Some time later Shock! returned to the streets of Castletown, attacking Tom Tom and Jack Staff. The battle caught the attention of the Butler, who joined the fight on the side of the heroes. With the Butler's help, Jack Staff is able to defeat Shock!

== Gerald Skinner ==
First appearance: Jack Staff (v1) #1

Editor of The World's Press, Castletown's local tabloid newspaper, which Burdock describes as making "The Sport look like a bastion of truth and integrity". Cynical and populist, Skinner overrides any attempt by Becky Burdock to do any serious journalism in favour of sensationalism - to the extent that when Becky is turned into a vampire Skinner takes out advertisements promoting her as a "vampire reporter".

== The Skull ==
First appearance: The Weird World of Jack Staff #1

An alien who crash-landed on Earth in 1973, with a small fragment of him surviving. Due to the energy given off scientists at Castletown's Alternate Energy Research Centre experimented on the Skull, inadvertently reviving him. He goes on a rampage, easily defeating Unit D before being overloaded by Jack Staff.

However this does not destroy the Skull but instead dissipates him. Over the course of the next 30 years the Skull is able to gradually reassemble and attacks Commander Hawkes before heading to Castletown, looking for revenge on Jack. However, due to Calendar Girl's interference with the timestream John Smith is unaware of his double identity. Becky nearly talks the villain down until the typically clumsy handling of the matter by Maveryk gives the game away. Instead, after the Skull defeats Tom Tom, Becky smashes the Skull with a sledgehammer.

== The Spider ==
First appearance: Jack Staff (v1) #6

Using his own huge intellect to devise a powered exoskeleton suit, the Spider was a successful 'supercrook' of the sixties, but later claimed his crimes were not particularly violent. Unit D were formed in response to his ilk but the Spider himself evaded capture by both them and Jack Staff. Indeed, he was never even seen - his crimes instead being identified by his calling cards, though he came close to being seen by Jack at a theft in Stockbridge in 1968. Following a notorious theft of gold bullion from the Bank of England, Unit D were disbanded and the Spider retired.

Taking the identity of Albert Chinard, he took up residence in Castletown, with no one any the wiser. At age 73, he broke cover and revealed himself to Jack Staff after a thief stole one of his suits, with the Spider taking umbrage to both the theft and the criminal's violent tendencies. With Jack Staff's help he was able to get the pretender into police custody, slipping away after knocking his old adversary out. He did, however, leave evidence that cleared Jack. He later reappeared at The World's Press competition for guessing the contents of a rediscovered casket, and stole the £10,000 prize in the resulting confusion. However, he was seemingly overwhelmed by the Claw shortly afterwards.

The Spider is a straight transplant of the Fleetway Publications character of the same name. After the original character was revived in the licensed WildStorm series Albion in 2005, the Jack Staff version has only been referred to as Alfred Chinard. Albion made use of the Chinard alias, which that series' version of Zip Nolan correctly noted as an anagram of "arachnid". The Jack Staff version was shown to be recruited by a shadowy organisation in a subplot, and in a letters page Grist stated the character would have a sizeable role in the second arc of The Weird World of Jack Staff. However, the comic ended before this could take place.

== The Starfall Squad ==
First appearance: The Weird World of Jack Staff King-Size Special #1

The United Kingdom has a secret space program, and science experiments that go apocalyptically wrong are launched into space in satellites to get rid of them. To handle the satellites that come back to Earth and also general alien activity, the British government set up the Starfall Squad.

Their members are:

- George: a large and physically strong being of unknown species and origin.
- Doctor Anne Dromeda: a xenoscientist from Ipswich.
- Colonel Adam Venture: Britain's first man in space.

== Liz Stewart ==
First appearance: Jack Staff (v2) #1

Liz Stewart was a Colonel in Project H in 1981, and attempted to curb the excesses of superior Malone when the Hurricane is unleashed on Castletown.

She is subsequently appointed commander of the Secret Military Intelligence Lethal Executive (S.M.I.L.E.) and returned to Castletown to help when the Hurricane force begins to affect the city's population.

== Sommerset Stone ==
First appearance: Weird World of Jack Staff Special (v1) #1

An uncouth gentleman explorer whose adventures included the discovery of Blazing Glory in a volcano in 1919; he subsequently adopted the girl as his daughter.

In retirement his home is targeted for burglary by the Claw. Eager for revenge, Stone later tracked the thief to Castletown and captured him, but was cut down by Mason's assassin soon afterwards.

== Templar Richard ==
First appearance: Jack Staff (v1) #2

A Knight Templar who became a vampire and an adversary of Jack Staff, Richard used the Castletown Blitz of 1940 as cover to kill Albert Bramble's mother. The Freedom Fighters are able to locate his lair, and Richard is impaled by a falling stalagtite and subsequently beheaded by Sgt. States.

His apparent return sixty years later brought Jack Staff out of retirement. However, Richard's body was where it was left in 1940; the latest round of vampiric killings are down to Sgt. States, who was turned by Richard shortly before his death.

== Time Leech ==
First appearance: Jack Staff (v1) #9

Most Time Leeches are relatively minor "time eaters", parasites from another dimension which feed on a small amount of time from an individual who merely perceives a few hours as passing quickly. However, one came across the slumbering form of the Eternal Warrior and feasted on his timeless immortality, greatly increasing its intelligence and abilities, as well as its hunger. Taking the form of a beautiful woman, the Time Leech took a place in Victorian high society, running a house where rich individuals could indulge their "eccentricities". This gave her the soft power to meet her own appetites - no longer sated by odd hours, the Time Leech fed on decades from victims, greatly advancing their age. Growing bored, the Time Leech planned to conquer Earth. She identified the adventurer Charlie Raven as the only human capable of stopping her, also becoming fascinated by Raven. She engineered a meeting with Raven and proposed a partnership. He refused, and as a result she had Raven drugged and buried in a casket. However, shortly after her plans went awry when police raided her home. In the resulting scuffle she banged her head on a door, losing her memory.

Over a hundred years later the Time Leech was living in Castletown's retirement home under the name Violet. Her memory was restored by a brief contact with Jack Staff, and she fed on carer Hannah Noone to restore her youth. Seeking out Jack Staff for more saw her again come across Raven, who had also been recently revived. While she was still infatuated with him he attempted to strangle her. As the struggle took place during a bank robbery the pair were separated and locked in a vault with Jack, Becky Burdock and Maveryk. Raven was able to free them from the vault but the Time Leech was left unconscious. Jack attempted to perform CPR but her body disappeared, and she returned to waiting in her original dimension once again, back in its original form.

== Tom Tom the Robot Man ==
First appearance: Jack Staff (v1) #1

Teenager Patricia "Trisha" Carthy is the orphaned daughter of Unit D members Russell Carthy and Sandra Lee, and has been in a wheelchair since an unspecified accident. Her father began work on the armoured suit that would become Tom Tom after Unit D was disbanded but an explosion killed both her parents when Trisha was 11. A genius, she was able to complete Tom Tom and find those responsible. Following that, Tom Tom became a popular hero patrolling the skies and streets of Castletown, operating out of a base which had previously been owned by the Four Good Guys.

Trisha pilots Tom Tom against villains including Doctor Tempest and Shock! before the suit is disabled battling Sgt. States. During her recuperation from the battle, she is attacked at the Royal Infirmary by Tempest, who has deduced her identity, but even in her wheelchair is able to defeat him. After recovering, Trisha reworked Tom Tom as a remote-controlled unit and returned to fighting crime after a six-month gap, becoming a frequent ally of Jack Staff and Becky Burdock.

While the initial appearances of Tom Tom were designed in reference to the Fleetway Publications character Robot Archie, subsequent story developments established the character as substantially different.

== Tommy Twister ==
First appearance: Jack Staff (v1) #1

A plucky teenager, he had an unexplained accident that turned him into a sentient wind current. He was forced to, literally, "pull himself together" and uses a containment suit to stay alive. Despite only being 14, he served with the Freedom Fighters in 1940. During the 1942 battle against Brain Head, Tommy was lured out of his suit, which was then destroyed by Kapitan Krieg, and his form was subsequently split into four containers to prevent him from reforming. The containers were later retrieved by soldiers of the Home Guard when Krieg turned on Brain Head, though the British military were unsure if he could ever be restored.

== Unit D ==
Unit D were formed in 1962 to combat Britain's growing number of so-called supercrooks, and were led by Commander Hawkes. While they had considerable talent and technology, including the formidable Thunder Ship, the team largely came off worse in clashes with the Spider and the extraterrestrial Skull. The latter battle put the team out of action for 10 months. After the Spider was able to steal gold bullion from the Bank of England in 1986 the unit was disbanded in disgrace.

=== Other members ===
- Russell Carthy: Scientific genius. He attempted to use twin pistols on the Skull, but found his weapons ineffective. After Unit D disbanded, he married team-mate Sandra Lee and was developing Tom Tom the Robot Man when he and his wife were killed by an old enemy. They were avenged by their daughter, Trisha.
- Clive Horton: Intelligence.
- Peggy James: Surveillance systems.
- Sandra Lee: Weapons expert. Sandra unsuccessfully attempted to use a heavy weapon on the Skull, who promptly batted her aside. She married Russell Carthy after Unit D folded, and was mother to Trisha McCarthy. She was killed by an old enemy and avenged by her daughter.
- Terry Stringer: Unarmed combat. His ankle was broken during the team's battle with the Skull in 1973.

== Wilbur ==
First appearance: Jack Staff (v1) #8

A cheery talking skull of unknown origin that lives in Q's headquarters.
