= Scare for a Cure =

SCARE for a CURE is an Austin, Texas-based nonprofit organization that raises money for local charities, including the Breast Cancer Resource Center. Each year they produce an "extreme, full contact, interactive haunted house adventure" that runs around 45 minutes to an hour long. This combination of interactive adventure game and haunted house was pioneered by Richard Garriott at his Britannia Manor haunted attraction which began in 1988 and ran every two years until 1994. The torch was passed to Keith Ewing, former Britannia Manor construction manager, and continued in Wild Basin's Haunted Trails every year from 1996 to 2005.

What makes these three haunts a unique performance medium is the emphasis on script and story, similar to a play, but with an emphasis on interactive elements including making the audience play the role of the main character. It also requires a significant physical contribution from the guests, not simply walking through, but running, climbing, crawling, sliding, and occasionally swimming and/or rowing. As their website puts it, SCARE is "a story-driven, theatrical horror experience presented across 26 stages."

Volunteers from all over Austin and the surrounding area come together for this elaborate performance that generally runs during the last two weeks of October. High school drama troupes and Britannia Manor and Haunted Trails veterans continue to make up a significant portion of the volunteer pool, but they have been joined through the years by many members of the Elk's Lodge, as well as general theatre and Halloween enthusiasts from the Austin area. The significant presence of movie, video game, and stage industries in Austin provides a large pool of talented individuals. Local fiction writers, video game companies, and the Texas School for the Blind are frequent contributors as well.

== General History ==
SCARE for a CURE has two separate historical roots which came together in 2007.

Much of the original concept of a story-based, full-touch interactive theatre style of haunted attraction came from Britannia Manor and was carried on by a core group of dedicated volunteers for a decade in Wild Basin's Haunted Trails, before that group of volunteers combined efforts with Jarrett Crippen and SCARE for a CURE.

The other beginning was in Jarrett "The Defuser" Crippen's back yard charity haunt that he did for several years before SCARE for a CURE officially began. Jarrett Crippen, a detective in the Austin Police Department, and winner of the second season of reality show, "Who Wants to be a Superhero?," put on an elaborate haunt in his home and yard asking for donations to various charities, such as cans of food for the Austin Food Bank, as admission. Local high school drama troupes provided much of the acting talent.

Since 2007, SCARE for a CURE has raised over $500,000 for the Breast Cancer Resource Center and over $20,000 to Manor ISD and other local charities. In addition, a scholarship fund for volunteers seeking continuing education was created and has awarded more than $50,000 to students.

== Quest Night ==
Starting in 2013, due to a need for funding to improve safety infrastructure, they added a second annual event in the spring called Quest Night. Quest Night is an interactive action-adventure where players explore the land of Scaria in parties of six, similar to Dungeons and Dragons, LARPs, and True Dungeon events. Players choose from six classes and a variety of quests to embark upon during this up to five-hour adventure featuring combat, puzzles, and social encounters with a large cast of characters. With this unique premise, they advertise "The premiere interactive medieval action-adventure in Central Texas!"

For over ten years, much official lore, history, and playbooks for Quest Night have been released over the years to the public through the website. These materials include Encyclopedia Magica, How To Be A Hero, History of Scaria, The Origin of Goblins (video), and The Labors of Orkyulees.

== 2005 ==
2005 was both the last year of Wild Basin's Haunted Trails and also the last year that Jarrett Crippen put on a haunted house in his back yard. More than 1000 people went through Crippen's house and yard in the three-day run of his charity haunted house, which had been dubbed Scare for a Cure by then. This caused major difficulties with traffic in his neighborhood which necessitated the intervention of traffic control officers.

== 2006 ==
Both the Wild Basin Haunted Trails volunteer group and Jarrett Crippen took a year off.

== 2007 ==
Wild Basin donated all the props, flats and other materials that had been stored from Haunted Trails to Crippen for use in his new haunted attraction. The experienced floating volunteer pool, many of whom had been doing haunts for more than ten years, beginning at Britannia Manor, transferred their energy to Crippen's effort. Crippen, and many of the key volunteers belonged to the BPOE (Benevolent and Protective Order of the Elks). The Austin Elk's Lodge #201 provided SCARE for a CURE a prime location for a large-scale haunt that could handle the traffic levels and other demands. Half the proceeds of SCARE were donated to Elk's Lodge scholarships, with the other half going to the Austin Breast Cancer Resource Centers. Crippen's fame as a recent reality show winner undoubtedly contributed to the level of media coverage. More than $12,000 was raised for SCARE sponsored charities.

The show was dubbed "Phobia Asylum" that year and the premise was that guests would be cured of their phobias, regardless of their nature by a radical new treatment which involved special chemically altered spider venom, and repeated exposure to the object of fear.

There was an odd challenge involved from "Lord Vile" local Austin self-styled super-villain who was also running a haunted house in Austin. If his haunted house got more customers than SCARE on nights when they both ran, half of his proceeds would go to SCARE charities. If Lord Vile's haunt got more customers, he would donate half of his proceeds to NORML.

== 2008 ==
In 2008, a board of directors was elected, and the process of incorporating into a non-profit organization began. The Elks Lodge again hosted the performance, and half of the proceeds went to the Elks Lodge scholarship fund. The other half of the proceeds went to four $2500 scholarships awarded to Austin area high school students whose lives had been adversely affected by cancer, either by losing a close family member, or in one case, by being diagnosed with cancer, themselves. In 2008, volunteer hours were tracked for the first time, resulting in totals of over 8000 hours from more than 200 volunteers.

The SCARE theme was "video games gone wrong" and the sub-title was "World of Horrorcraft." The basic premise was that a new technology had been invented that allowed players to upload their consciousness into video games so they could play directly, rather than through pushing buttons on a controller. Naturally, things go horribly wrong from there, thanks to an evil artificial intelligence named A.L.I.C.E. and the dastardly behind-the-scenes shenanigans of the technology creator, Dunstan Interactive Entertainment (DIE).

== 2009 ==
In 2009, SCARE announced that they are moving to a new location. Richard Garriott has become a sponsor, and allowed them to build this year's haunt on the location of his partially completed mansion, which he refers to as Britannia Manor Mark 2. This is being hinted at as a return of the famous haunt, Britannia Manor, but Garriott's level of involvement may be minimal, aside from providing a venue. Jarrett Crippen is still listed as the director.

SCARE has returned to the 2007 charity of Austin Breast Cancer Resource Centers for the full amount of the proceeds, with a general intention of having Austin BCRC as their primary ongoing charity. 501-C non-profit papers have been filed, and regular monthly board meetings are now held in conjunction with the haunt script and planning meetings.

The sub-title for this year is "Blood Ritual" with a general vampire-related theme. The premise is that the guests have come to interview for the chance to join the Researchers In the Paranormal (RIP), a paranormal investigation organization. As rookie RIPpers, they will have a chance to prove themselves in a genuine investigation of the possible reappearance of Britannia Manor. Unbeknownst to the RIPpers, they are being used by a cabal of vampires in their attempt to raise an all-powerful demon and rule the world. It's up to the guests to find a way to foil their evil plot, and get out alive.

== 2010 ==
Zombie Apocalypse

== 2011 ==
The theme for the 2011 Haunted House was "Carnival of Lost Souls" in which participants meet the ringmaster of a carnival who sends them into a field of ruins to find his lost talisman. Players must watch out for Chuckles, a man-eating clown, and Ivo, the evil brother of the ringmaster.

== 2012 ==
Summer Camp Massacre

== 2013 ==
The first-ever Quest Night event occurs, Glory and Gold.

The theme for 2013 was Fairy Tale Nightmare. Fairy tale archaeologists had visited their subjects of study and brought back artifacts from the fictitious world to showcase in their museum. But their excursions also brought about a change in the stories themselves. Now guests must travel into this other realm to put the stories right - but the new and twisted fairy tale characters may have other plans...

In addition to the haunt, this year featured 2 new attractions: an interactive ghost town murder mystery and a maze, also known as the Boneyard. The murder mystery consisted of groups of guests traveling from one vignette to another, attempting to unravel the secret of the ghost town by talking to its dearly departed residents. The boneyard was a wooden maze where guests must find a way out, but beware: your group may not be the only ones trapped within the walls - and the denizens of the boneyard only get to hunt once a year...

== 2014 ==
Quest Night: Haunt for the Lich King

Due to popular demand, the haunt is doing its first-ever sequel: Return to Zombie Wasteland. It's been 40 years since the zombie virus devastated humanity. No more grocery stores, no more gas stations. No more reality TV. But if you can make it to the City of Prosper, you might have a chance of surviving the Return to Zombie Wasteland.

There will also be another high-octane maze experience, the Slaughterhouse.

== 2015 ==
Quest Night: Black Blood Rising

Haunt: Dread Asylum

== 2016 ==
Quest Night: No show, break year.

Haunt: Final Judgement

== 2017 ==
Quest Night: Elemental Revolt

Haunt: Return To Mutant Wasteland

== 2018 ==
Quest Night: Shadow Nightmares

Haunt: The Last Laugh

== 2019 ==
Quest Night: The Wild Hunt

Haunt: Trial of Blood and Stone

== 2020-2021 ==
The annual Haunt and Quest Night events are cancelled due to the COVID-19 pandemic.

== 2022 ==
Quest Night: The Return of the Orcs

Haunt: Curse of The Blood Demon

== 2023 ==
Quest Night: Nature's Wrath

Haunt: Museum of Madness

== 2024 ==
Quest Night: Season of Cold Flame

Haunt: Nightmares of Legend

== 2025 ==
Quest Night: A Celebration of Peace

Haunt: Mind Crawlers

== 2026 ==
Quest Night's theme was "The War of the Silent Throne". During the Celebration of Peace last year, Scaria's Queen Anne was assassinated with the help of the nation of Hasok. Northern Scaria is now under their control. As they continue their invasion, The Prince Anson is nowhere to be found, leaving the throne empty. Will new dwarven tech help heroes rise up in this chaos or is something evil behind this new research?
