= Mega Snake =

- DVD cover
- Written by: Robby Robinson; Alexander Volz
- Story by: Boaz Davidson
- Directed by: Tibor Takács
- Starring: Michael Shanks; Siri Baruc; John T. Woods; Nick Harvey; Ben Cardinal; Matthew Atherton
- Country of origin: United States
- Original language: English

Production
- Producers: Boaz Davidson; Avi Lerner; Oren Senderman
- Cinematography: Emil Topuzov
- Editor: Ellen Fine
- Running time: 88 minutes
- Production company: Nu Image

Original release
- Network: Sci Fi Channel
- Release: August 25, 2007

Mega Snake is a 2007 made-for-television science fiction horror film by Sci Fi Pictures. The film was produced by the company Nu Image Films as an original movie for broadcasting on the Sci Fi cable television network. It was shot in Sofia, Bulgaria.

The film features a special appearance by Feedback, the winning hero on the channel's first Who Wants to Be a Superhero? contest. Though it was originally advertised as "Starring Feedback", he is a minor character that only appears for a moment towards the end of the movie.

== Plot ==
The film begins in 1986, when a young Les Daniels, who is terrified of snakes, is forced to go to a snake-handling ceremony. When he is supposed to give one of the snakes to his father, he hesitates, giving the snake enough time to bite his father's artery. His father dies in a matter of minutes.

Twenty years later, Les' fear persists in addition to his guilt for being partially responsible for his father's death; his older brother, Duff, often teases him regarding the former. To help him get over his phobia, Duff goes to a Native American snake proprietor, Screaming Hawk. While there, Hawk tells him about a small snake living inside a jar on his desk. The snake, called Unteka, is actually an ancient snake that grows at a massive rate and whose species had killed many of Hawk's tribe in the past. The tribe was finally able to kill all but one of them, and so Unteka is the last of his kind. Duff is given three rules regarding the snake: "Don't let it out of the jar, don't let it eat anything living, and never fear the heart of the snake." Despite being told he cannot have Unteka, Duff steals it.

Once at home, Duff accidentally breaks the jar. Les sees the snake double in size almost instantly, but a distracted Duff doesn't believe him. That night, while Duff is sleeping, the snake eats the pet cat, quickly growing to almost twenty times its original size. It sneaks out into the chicken coop, killing all but one, which it soon finishes off. When Les' mother hears the commotion, she goes investigates the coop, only to meet the same fate.

Duff becomes afraid that the legend has merit and decides to ask some local hick exterminators how to deal with his situation. They say that if the snake hasn't yet reached full size, Duff could kill it by stabbing it in the head. Duff does so and seems to have successfully killed Unteka. The following night, however, the snake revives, killing both him and the family dog.

Les returns home after a long night of drinking and his fight with Duff, only to find the place ransacked. He calls his police officer girlfriend, Erin, as well as her arrogant ex-boyfriend, Bo, the chief of police. When Les says that he has a gut feeling that his family is dead, Bo becomes suspicious that Les might be the killer and arrests him.

Unteka then attacks a vacationing family in the woods, killing the father, and attacking the rest who are taking refuge in the family van. Erin arrives and inspects the incident, indicating that they are most likely hiding if they managed to escape. Erin starts to believe Les' story, but Bo remains skeptical. Erin heads deeper into the woods and finds a giant snakeskin, signifying that the creature is still growing. She helps Les escape, and they meet with Screaming Hawk to try to learn more about Unteka.

Bo and his team finally conclude that Unteka is real and make a move to kill it. The enormous creature jumps at them with only Bo able to temporarily escape. Before he dies, he comes to the homes of the exterminators Duff spoke with earlier. They attempt to kill the beast, but it ultimately turns the tables on them.

Meanwhile, Les, Erin, and Screaming Hawk all begin searching for Unteka's current location. Unteka, which is now 70 feet (21 m) long, heads to the county fair, where the actor that inspired and portrays the comic character Feedback is making a guest appearance. The snake kills a young couple and three stoned men before making its way inside. Unteka then kills multiple people, including Fay off-screen (Les' paramedic partner). Feedback is able to hold the snake off long enough to save some innocents in the crowd before fleeing himself.

On the way into the park, the trio sees a little girl trapped in a ride. Erin is able to save her but ends up being swallowed whole herself.

After being eaten, Erin calls Les via walkie-talkie, revealing that she's still alive. Les' group heads into a haunted roller coaster ride to save Erin. While scanning the area, Les looks behind Hawk who, upon seeing the shock on Les' face, quickly turns around and tries to stab the snake, but Unteka tosses him aside. With Les the only remaining able-body, he allows Unteka to devour him, making no attempts to resist in order to encourage the snake to eat him whole. Unteka advances towards an injured Hawk, but before it can attack, it screams out and flails in agony before falling to the floor dead. Les cuts a hole out of the snake's chest and, holding its heart, tells Hawk to help pull out Erin. They embrace and exit the ride with Hawk holding the snake's heart.

Within a few months, Les and Erin get married and have their first child; Les having gotten over his phobia.

== Cast ==
- Michael Shanks as Les Daniels
  - Itai Diakov as Young Les Daniels
- Siri Baruc as Erin
- Michal Yannai as Fay
- Ben Cardinal as Screaming Hawk
- John T. Woods as Duff Daniels
  - Yoan Karamfilov as Young Duff Daniels
- Todd Jensen as Bo "Big Bo"
- Nick Harvey as Cooley
- Harry Anichin as Patterson
- Laura Giosh as Dixie Daniels
- Mark W. Johnson as Hewlett Daniels
- Michael McCoy as Mayor Artimus Kornferry
- Terence H. Winkleness as Mr. Jensen
- Andrea Anwright as Mrs. Jensen
- Asen Mutafchiev as James Jensen
- Naum Shopov as Derek Jensen
- Matthew Atherton as Feedback
- Dejan Angelov as Drug Guy #1
- Darin Angelov as Drug Guy #2
- Antoni Argirov as Marc

== See also ==
- List of killer snake films
