= Britannia Manor =

Residence of Richard Garriott

Coordinates: 30°21′48.91″N 97°49′15.43″W

Britannia Manor was the residence of game designer Richard Garriott. The name comes from the castle of Lord British, ruler of Britannia, the setting of the Ultima computer role playing game series, which he created. Britannia Manor was situated atop a large hill near Austin, Texas. The home was featured in a 2007 episode of the HGTV television series Secret Spaces and on MTV Cribs.

Britannia Manor was also the name given to what has been called the world's most famous haunted house, held in this location every two years from 1988 to 1994.

== Design ==
The manor's medieval design reflected Garriott's interest in the era.

The house was adorned with various medieval items such as crossbows, swords, and armour. It features traps and a network of secret passages and rooms. A secret room in the basement contained some of Garriott's most treasured artifacts, including dinosaur fossils, a coffin with a human skeleton inside it, and an authentic 16th century vampire hunting kit. The house also featured other collections such as hairs from the Glacier snowman, a brick from the Great Wall of China, a Russian spacesuit, and three stained glass windows retrieved from an abandoned church. There was a large collection of automatons. The basement room he referred to as the dungeon, had shrunken heads, mummified remains of parts of people as well as a mummified bird found in a tomb in Egypt, and human skulls.

The house also had an observatory in the main complex. Although part of the house, it was structurally independent from the rest of the house in order to damp out vibrations, as they ruined long-exposure space photos.

Britannia Manor was designed by designer/architect, Alan Barley, of Barley & Pfeiffer Architects in Austin, Texas. In 1996, Garriott hired Moore-Andersson Architects, Austin, to design another house on a nearby riverfront property. The property was situated atop a bluff overlooking the Austin, Texas skyline, the 360 Bridge, and Lake Austin. Britannia Manor Mark 3 will also have a rotating observatory and will be more castle than house. Construction on this house was delayed for some time after the dot com crash. It resumed for a while a few years later, but was put on indefinite hold when Garriott decided in 2008 to spend the majority of his fortune to go into space.

There was a working cannon at the front door and an indoor grotto with hot-and-cold-running rain showers.

After spending several years on the market, the house was sold in December, 2014. The new owner demolished the house in late 2016.

== Haunt history ==
Before 1995, Britannia Manor was famous for hosting the most elaborate haunted house in the US. Garriott spent a great deal of money biannually around Halloween to pay for makeup, tools, construction materials, special effects, and costumes for his haunted house. The actors and techs were all volunteers, many donating hundreds of hours for the honor of being a part of the show, and a free T-shirt. Only two men were paid to work on Britannia Manor, Greg Dykes and Keith Ewing, from local construction company Custom Creations. They oversaw and organized much of the specialized set construction. Invitations to what Garriott thought of as a giant house party were given away free, with the exception of a few shows where tickets were donated to charity and sold for $100 or more. People waited for as long as two weeks, camped out in front of Garriott's house, to be first in line to receive the free invitations.

Britannia Manor was a full contact Halloween adventure. The events were designed like a role-playing game. Participants would go through Garriott's mountain property in adventuring parties, gathering clues to solve mysteries and quests, while facing different perils and pitfalls. The actors would touch, grab, and physically as well as verbally interact with the guests, who could not simply wander through like in most haunted houses. They would have to swing, crawl, climb, and row their way out. It was not uncommon for parties to lose members in the course of the quest.

The format of an interactive full contact haunted adventure that Richard Garriott created has continued to this day. Many of the volunteers who worked on Britannia Manor, including Keith Ewing, formerly of Custom Creations, transferred Richard's ideas and their talent and enthusiasm to support the Wild Basin Wilderness Preserve in Austin for nine years from 1996 to 2005 by creating Wild Basin's Haunted Trails. Since 2007, many of those volunteers have, and continue to support SCARE for a CURE, a charity haunted house formerly in the Austin Elk's Lodge, now in Lorane Ghost Town directed by Jarrett Crippen, aka The Defuser. SCARE for a CURE has now incorporated as a non-profit.

In 2009, SCARE for a CURE, now sponsored by Richard Garriott but still under the direction of Jarrett Crippen, was held in Garriott's unfinished manor about half mile from the original manor, which he has dubbed Britannia Manor Mark 3 (Mark 1 being his original house in New Hampshire, and Mark 2 being his current residence).

== Curtain Theater ==
On the waterfront portion of the property, Garriott had built a scaled replica of an Elizabethan outdoor theater called the Curtain, after the original Curtain Theatre. Capable of seating well over a hundred, Garriott's Curtain theater was modeled after the style also replicated in full-scale by Sam Wanamaker's Globe Theatre replica in Southwark, on the south bank of the Thames, in an area known as Bankside.

== Media coverage ==
It was featured on an episode of MTV Cribs.

A free documentary was also made called The World's Most Famous Haunted House: A Tribute to Britannia Manor.

== Burglar attack ==
In 1997 the house was broken into by a deranged fan. Garriott held him off with an Uzi, firing a warning shot while waiting for police to arrive.
