= Feedback (disambiguation) =

Feedback is what occurs when outputs of a system are routed back as inputs as part of a chain of cause-and-effect that forms a circuit or loop.

Feedback may also refer to:

== Engineering ==
- Feedback control loop, a closed-loop controller
- Audio feedback, the "howl" sometimes heard in microphone or guitar amplification systems
- Video feedback, the optical equivalent of audio feedback, caused when a camera films the image it is producing
- Positive feedback, a feedback system that responds to perturbation in the same direction as the perturbation
- Negative feedback, a method of attenuation to restore equilibrium
- Negative-feedback amplifier, an amplifier designed to stabilize a system and improve performance

== Human behaviour ==
- Corrective feedback, by a parent or teacher to guide a child's learning process
- Delayed Auditory Feedback, a method of combating stuttering
- Employee performance appraisal, particularly methods such as 360-degree feedback

== Science ==
- Biofeedback
- Climate change feedback, for positive and negative feedbacks associated with climate change
- Reinforcement learning from human feedback, a machine learning technique that uses human feedback to directly optimize a model

== Mathematics ==
- Feedback arc set, in graph theory, a method of eliminating directed graphs
- Feedback vertex set, in computational complexity theory, the feedback vertex set problem is a graph-theoretical NP-complete problem

== Comics ==
- Feedback (Marvel Comics), a Marvel Comics superhero
- Feedback (Dark Horse Comics), the winner of Who Wants to be a Superhero? and a Dark Horse Comics superhero

== Music ==
- "Feedback" (Janet Jackson song), 2008
- "Feedback" (Kanye West song), 2016
- Feedback, a 1944 album by Les Paul
- Feedback (Spirit album), 1972
- Feedback (EP), a 2004 EP by Rush
- Feedback (Jurassic 5 album), 2006
- "Feedback", a song by Covenant from their 1996 album Sequencer
- Feedback (Derek Webb album), 2010
- Feedback (band), a Bangladeshi rock band

== Other ==
- Feedback (novel), a 2016 horror novel by Seanan McGuire, writing under the pen name Mira Grant
- Feedback (radio series), a BBC Radio Four programme in the UK
- Feedback, a Conductoid and alien transformation in Ben 10: Omniverse
- Feedback, a superhero in the Dark Horse Comics
- Feedback, a design principle in User interface design
- Feedback loop (email)
- Causal loop in the context of time travel or the causal structure of spacetime, that is a sequence of events (actions, information, objects, people)
- Feedback (pork industry), the practice of feeding infected deceased pigs and their manure to breeding pigs
- Feedback (TV series), a 2023 Polish television series
