= Defuser =

The Defuser
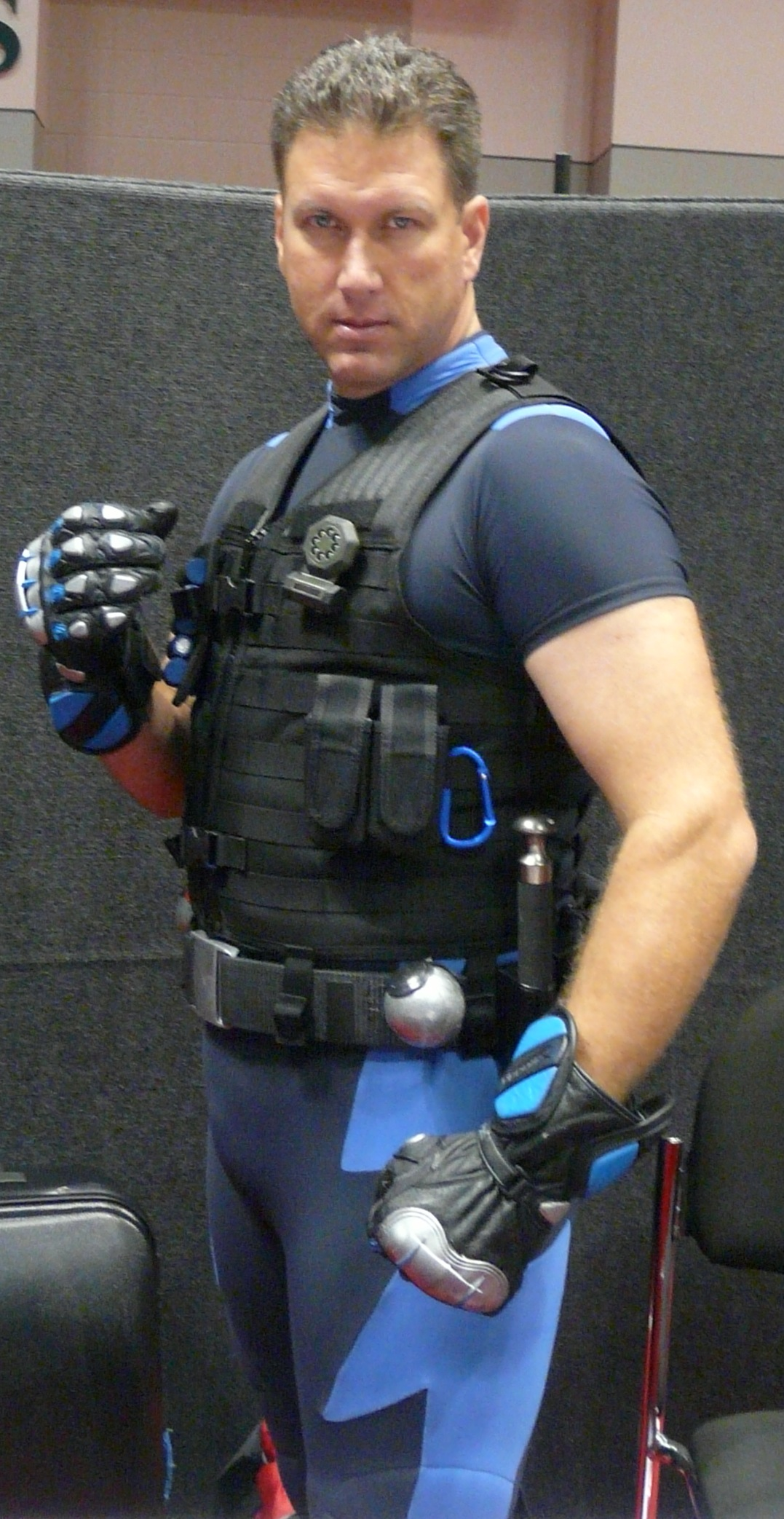
- Crippen as The Defuser at Gen Con Indy 2008 in Indianapolis.

Publication information
- Publisher: Dark Horse Comics
- First appearance: Who Wants to Be a Superhero?
- Created by: Jarrett Crippen

In-story information
- Alter ego: Jarrett Crippen
- Abilities: Enhanced strength, speed, agility, reflexes, hearing and eyesight Night vision to a range of 60 feet Ability to function at 110%

The Defuser is a superhero created and originally portrayed by Austin, Texas police detective Jarrett Crippen on the reality television series Who Wants to Be a Superhero?. As a result of winning the show in its second season, his character is the subject of a Dark Horse Comics comic book written by Jeremy Barlow with art by Kajo Baldisimo and appeared in a Sci Fi Channel original movie entitled Lightning Strikes in 2009.

== Fictional character biography ==
The Defuser is an expert paramilitary superhero who uses non-lethal weaponry and gadgets to stop villains. He has the unique ability to function at 110 percent (this boosts his speed, strength, agility, reflexes, hearing, and eyesight) making him slightly more formidable than virtually any single foe. He has a night vision to a range of 60 feet. The Defuser is susceptible to bright light (he must wear protective eyewear or he risks being blinded). He does not harm his foes severely with weapons. His archenemies are drug dealers. His catchphrase is, "When the Defuser's around, the bad guys are going down!"

In The Defuser's Dark Horse comic, he fought a plane full of hijackers hand-to-hand to save the passengers, which included his wife Norma. He also, with the help of a sympathetic robot cop, disabled an artificial intelligence determined to preserve its own existence by destroying him.

== Jarrett Crippen ==
Jarrett Crippen is also the director and founder of SCARE for a CURE, a non-profit charity and interactive haunted adventure modeled after, and using many of the same talented volunteers, as Richard Garriott's Britannia Manor and Wild Basin's Haunted Trails. Scare for a Cure started as a haunted house that Jarrett put on in his back yard, asking for donations of canned food for local food banks. It grew year by year, with help from the drama troupes of local high schools. In 2007, shortly after winning the Who Wants to Be a Superhero reality show, Jarrett moved his production to the Austin Elk's lodge. That was when he was joined by many of the volunteers who had done Britannia Manor and Haunted Trails in years past. Props and costumes stored at the Wild Basin wilderness preserve were also given to SCARE for a CURE.

The resulting interactive haunted adventure raised close to $10,000 for breast cancer charities and Elk's club sponsored scholarships in 2007, and awarded four $2500 scholarships to deserving students adversely affected by cancer in 2008. In 2009, SCARE went back to its roots. With Richard Garriott's blessing, it relocated to his partially built (and never finished) Britannia Manor Mark 2. SCARE was held at that location for 2 years. The 2009 haunt logged over 12,000 volunteer hours from nearly 300 volunteers. In 2011, the interactive haunt re-located to the Ghost Town in Manor, Texas, 14219 Littig Road, where it has operated every year since, with the exception of 2020. In 2020, it was cancelled due to the COVID-19 pandemic. SCARE now primarily supports the Breast Cancer Resource Center of Texas (BCRC) along with other charities. They raised $45,000 for BCRC in 2019. The all-volunteer crew has included teams from Sony Online Entertainment, Office Max, Americorp, Austin Art Institute, and students from Austin Sunshine Camps and Texas School for the Blind and Visually Impaired/Criss Cole Rehabilitation Center.

The same organization also put on epic fantasy interactive adventures in the spring called "Quest Night" from 2012 to the present, although the 2021 event was cancelled due to COVID-19. This included a Dungeons & Dragons style of play where patrons became fighters and magic users and clerics, and fights with monsters in this live action interactive theater experience were often decided by the roll of dice.

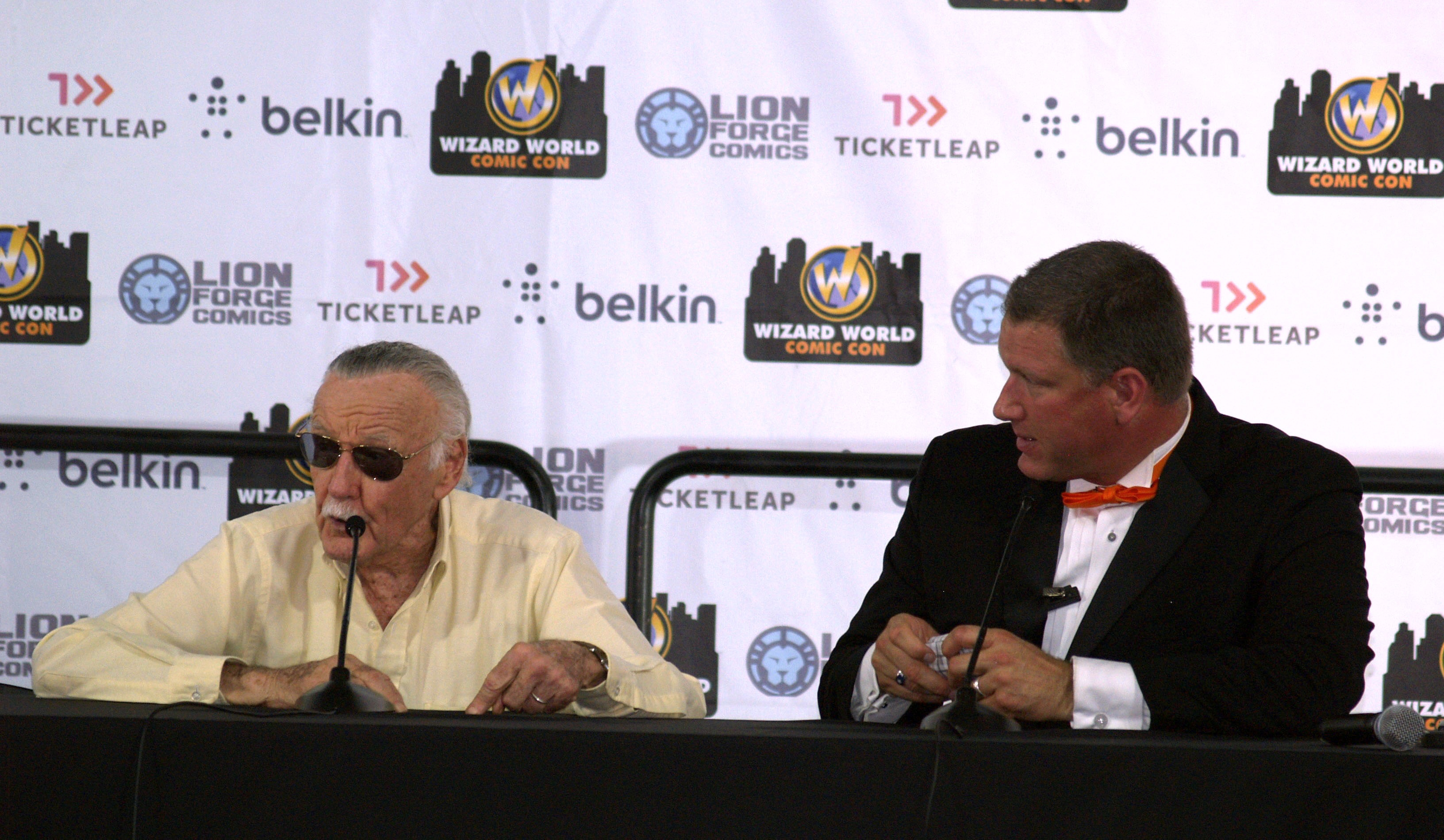
Crippen moderating a Q&A panel with Stan Lee at the 2013 Wizard World New York Experience.

Since 2010, Crippen has served as emcee, panel moderator, and public speaker for Wizard World and other comic conventions across the country. He was known for always wearing a colorful bow tie, and doing a lot of special panels and costume contests for children. He was also frequently a general aid and frequent interview panel moderator for the late Stan Lee who was hard of hearing. Crippen has a deep, clear voice making it easier for Mr. Lee to hear and answer questions he was asked, and they knew each other from Who Wants to Be a Superhero. Crippen continued to emcee comic conventions periodically until 2018.

Crippen used to make amateur movies with friends who also tried out for Who Wants to Be a Superhero, making mini-movies of The Defuser and sidekicks Gravnos and XSeven, along with villain the Punk. These videos were made available on YouTube and Myspace.

He was an active member of the Champion's server chat forum, and co-founder of the Megaforce supergroup for the online game City of Heroes.

Since its resurrection as a free-to-play game, he has again become an avid City of Heroes player.

In 2017, Crippen retired as an Austin Police officer with the rank of Master Detective after 25 years of service in the APD, including teaching as an Austin Police Academy instructor.
