= The Spider (British comics) =

- The Spider, art by Reg Bunn.

Publication information
- Publisher: IPC Magazines
- First appearance: Lion (June 26, 1965)
- Created by: Ted Cowan (writer); Reg Bunn (artist)

In-story information
- Alter ego: Unknown
- Team affiliations: "Professor" Pelham; Roy Ordini; The Army of Crime; Society of Heroes

The Spider is a British comic book character who began as a supervillain before becoming a superhero. He appeared in Lion between 26 June 1965 and 26 April 1969 and was reprinted in Vulcan. He was created by writer Ted Cowan and artist Reg Bunn. Superman co-creator Jerry Siegel took over the writing of the character with his third adventure, and would write the bulk of his adventures.

== Publication history ==
The Spider first appeared in Lion from 26 June 1965, and his adventures were divided into serials of varying lengths. Soon after losing his second lawsuit contesting the ownership of Superman and subsequent sacking by DC Comics, Jerry Siegel made advances to Fleetway looking for work and was sent samples of various stories before choosing to work on the Spider. His first work on the character was published in the 8 January 1966 issue, the start of the serial "The Spider v Doctor Mysterioso".

At the end of the serial NYD detectives Bob Gilmore and Pete Trask, who had been attempting to capture the Spider throughout the strip, made their last appearance, with the Spider instead battling a wide variety of fantastic villains instead. At the end of Siegel's third serial, "The Spider v the Executioner", the character renounced villainy and became more of an anti-hero. After the end of the serial "Ordini the Terrible" in the 1 February 1969 edition Siegel would leave Fleetway to work for Western Publishing. Staff writer Ken Mennell took over for two short serials before the feature ended following the 26 April 1969 issue of Lion. Bunn remained as artist throughout the strip's entire run in Lion.

Parallel to his weekly adventures the Spider was also featured in the hardback Lion Annual books from 1967 to 1971, with a one-off reappearance in 1975. The character also featured in the picture library format Super Library Fantastic Series (renamed Stupendous Series from #3), with the Steel Claw featuring in the odd-numbered editions and the Spider in the even-numbered editions. These consisted of 128-page self-contained adventures and ran from 1967 to 1968. Due to the demands of the weekly strips and a lower page rate both the annuals and the Super Libraries featured different writers (including a returning Kearton, Mennell and staff writer Donne Avenell) and artists (including Aldo Marculetta and Francisco Cueto).

A one-off new strip featuring the character appeared in the 1980 Lion Holiday Special, pitting the Spider against Lion stalwart Robot Archie. This strip was drawn by M. David Harwood.

=== Overseas ===
The Spider's adventures were also reprinted in other countries, such as Germany (in Kobra), Spain, Portugal, Italy, France, India and others.

=== Reprint runs ===
From 22 April 1972 to 8 December 1973 selected serials were reprinted in Lion. "The Spider v Spider-Boy" was truncated, with sections redrawn by John M. Burns. Later, the format of Kobra was copied by Fleetway for the US-format reprint title Vulcan. Initially the title was trialled in Scotland only, where the first four serials reprinted from the first edition on 1 March 1975 to 20 September 1975. The fourth, "The Spider v the Android Emperor", was edited to allow the newly national volume to begin with "The Spider v the Exterminator". The title ended after the 3 April 1976 edition, leaving a reprint of "The Spider v the Crook from Outer Space" incomplete - while selected strips continued in an insert after Vulcan was merged with Valiant the Spider was not among them. A further reprint was also included in the sole Vulcan Annual.

== Fictional character biography ==
The Spider appeared in the 1960s in the United States with the aim to become the 'King of Crooks'. His base of operations was a Scottish castle he brought over to America. He broke out several other criminals to become members of his army of crime and would clash with both the police and with other criminal masterminds. Among these were Mirror Man (who specialised in illusions), Doctor Mysterioso (a multi-talented scientist) and The Android Emperor (who could create a wide variety of robots). He also clashed with a number of criminal gangs, and one organisation, Crime Incorporated, hired the assassin The Exterminator to kill him. The Spider seemed defeated but struck an alliance with his would-be killer, and the pair took down Crime Incorporated. This achieved, the Spider drained the Exterminator, aging him decades with a booby-trapped handshake when the latter tried to double-cross him.

The Spider found fighting criminals to be exhilarating and decided to pit his wits against threats to mankind from now on. For a brief time, he was associated with the Society of Heroes (consisting Captain Whiz; Mr. Gizmo; Rex Robot; Tigro the Wild Man; Rockman; Snowman); all except The Spider died fighting the Sinister Seven. Other foes he faced included The Crime Genie, Spider-Boy, The Snake, The Death-Master, the Ant, the Red Baron, The Fly, The Molecule Man, The Chessman, and Mr. Stonehart.

== Powers and abilities ==
It is unclear what powers, if any, The Spider has. He is physically fit, but probably not any more than most humans. He is supremely arrogant and self-confident. He is also cunning and intelligent, and a superb hypnotist. He has trained himself to be immune to his own knockout/poison gas.

The Spider wears a black form-fitting outfit along with a strange backpack/harness. The harness serves as a jetpack and webshooters, as well as the sources for his web gun and gas gun. He has a large number of gadgets of his own invention at his disposal. His reluctant allies are a pair of freed criminals, the genius 'Prof' Pelham and the safecracker Roy Ordini. They were the only members of his 'army of crime' to stay on after The Spider renounced his criminal ways. Despite this, he treated them very badly and in return they often tried to harm or even kill him. Their failures often brought humiliating punishments from their master.

== Stories ==
=== Serials ===
Story	Issues	Episodes	Writer	Artist
The Spider	Lion 26 June - 4 September 1965	10	Ted Cowan	Reg Bunn
Return of the Spider	Lion 11 September 1965 - 1 January 1966	17	Ted Cowan	Reg Bunn
The Spider v. Dr. Mysterioso	Lion 8 January - 26 March 1966	12	Jerry Siegel	Reg Bunn
The Spider v. the Android Emperor	Lion 2 April - 18 June 1966	11	Jerry Siegel	Reg Bunn
The Spider v. the Exterminator	Lion 25 June - 17 September 1966	14	Jerry Siegel	Reg Bunn
The Spider v. the Crook from Outer Space	Lion 24 September 1966 - 28 January 1967	18	Jerry Siegel	Reg Bunn
The Spider v. the Crime Genie	Lion 4 February - 20 May 1967	16	Jerry Siegel	Reg Bunn
The Spider v. Spider-Boy	Lion 27 May - 7 October 1967	20	Jerry Siegel	Reg Bunn
The Spider v. the Sinister Seven	Lion 14 October 1967 - 11 May 1968	31	Jerry Siegel	Reg Bunn
The Spider v. the Snake	Lion 18 May - 14 September 1968	18	Jerry Siegel	Reg Bunn
Ordini the Terrible	Lion 21 September 1968 - 1 February 1969	21	Jerry Siegel	Reg Bunn
The Death-Master	Lion 8 February - 1 March 1969	4	Ken Mennell	Reg Bunn
The Spider v. the Ant	Lion 8 March - 26 April 1969	8	Ken Mennell	Reg Bunn

=== Annuals ===
Annual	Stories	Writer	Artist
Lion Annual 1967	The Spider in Cobra Island		Reg Bunn
Lion Annual 1968	The Spider & the Stone of Venus		Reg Bunn
Lion Annual 1969	The Spider versus the Red Baron; Starring... the Spider! (prose)		Reg Bunn
Lion Annual 1970	Island of Menace; The Spider Meets the Fly (prose)		Reg Bunn
Lion Annual 1971	The Fabulous Spider (prose)		
Lion Annual 1975	The Spider & the Molecule Man (prose)		

=== Super Libraries ===
Title	Date	Story	Writer	Artist
Fantastic Series #2	January 1967	The Professor of Power	Jerry Siegel	Aldo Marculeta
Stupendous Series #4	February 1967	Crime Unlimited	Donne Avenell	Giorgio Trevisian
Stupendous Series #6	March 1967	The Bubbles of Doom	Ted Cowan	Ogreras
Stupendous Series #8	April 1967	The Man Who Stole New York	David Morton	Aldo Marculeta
Stupendous Series #10	May 1967	The Chessman	Ken Mennell	Aldo Marculeta
Stupendous Series #12	June 1967	The Animator	Donne Avenell	Silio Romagnoli
Stupendous Series #14	July 1967	The Scarecrow's Revenge	Donne Avenell	Francisco Cueto
Stupendous Series #16	August 1967	Mr. Stonehart	Ken Mennell	Ogreras
Stupendous Series #18	September 1967	Dr. Argo's Challenge	Ken Mennell	Aldo Marculeta
Stupendous Series #20	October 1967	The Immortal	David Morton	Francisco Cueto
Stupendous Series #22	November 1967	The Shriveller	M. Scott Goodall	Aldo Marculeta
Stupendous Series #24	December 1967	The Melody of Crime	Ted Cowan	Francisco Cueto
Stupendous Series #26	January 1968	Child's Play	David Morton	Francisco Cueto

== Collected editions ==
The Spider's first three storylines from Lion (plus a bonus storyline from a Lion annual) have been reprinted in King of Crooks in 2005, with cover art by Garry Leach.

In April 2021, the Treasury of British Comics published a volume of strips that were originally serialised in Lion from 26 June 1965 to 18 June 1966 and the Lion Annual 1967. The collection featured a cover by Chris Weston.

== Other versions ==
- The Spider is mentioned in Jean-Patrick Manchette's 1976 crime novel West Coast Blues, where the criminal Bastien is a great fan of his adventures. As a result he is featured on two different pages in the book's graphic novel adaptation by Jacques Tardi, reprinted by Fantagraphics.
- In Alan Moore's Captain Britain story "Jaspers' Warp", a superhero called The Arachnid was killed by the Fury on Captain UK's world. He is seen only as a gravestone amongst a number of others, all also referencing versions of noted British superheroes.
- In the Nikolai Dante storyline The Romanov Job features Abel Ganz, the Tarantula - "Anarchist. Assassin and all-round master criminal" alongside other similar characters based on Janus Stark ("Janos Starak: Escapologist Extraordinaire"), Catwoman ("Selina Solaris: The Panther") and Crusher Creel ("Grushko Kreel").
- An older, retired and more benevolent version of The Spider has appeared in UK writer/artist Paul Grist's Image comic book Jack Staff. Grist named this character Alfred Chinard ("A. Chinard" being an anagram for "arachnid") at IPC Media's request.
- In the novel Sherlock Holmes y los zombis de Camford (Sherlock Holmes and the Camford Zombies) by Spanish author Alberto López Aroca, The Spider appears under the name "Seth Pride" (an anagram for "The Spider"), and his criminal-heroic career is set back to the beginning of the 20th century (the novel takes place in 1903). The character appears in this novel alongside a number of other IPC-Fleetway characters (including Timothy Jekyll aka Tim Kelly; Lewis Crandle aka Louis "Steel Claw" Crandell and Mightech aka Mytek, among others).
