= Jack Staff =

Comic book series

- The cover to Jack Staff #3. Art by Paul Grist.

Character information
- First appearance: Jack Staff (vol. 1) #1 (April 2000)
- Created by: Paul Grist

In-story information
- Alter ego: John Smith
- Species: Human
- Place of origin: Earth
- Team affiliations: Q Unit D Freedom Fighters
- Abilities: Longevity; Energy manipulation

Publication information
- Publisher: Dancing Elephant Press, 2000-2003; Image Comics, 2003-2011
- Schedule: Monthly
- Title(s): Jack Staff (12 issues, Dancing Elephant Press, 2000-2003); Jack Staff (20 issues, Image Comics, 2003-2009); The Weird World of Jack Staff Special (1 issue, Image Comics, 2007); Jack Staff Special (1 issue, Image Comics, 2008); The Weird World of Jack Staff (6 issues, Image Comics, 2010-2011)
- Formats: Original material for the series has been published as a set of ongoing series.
- Genre: Superhero
- Publication date: April 2000 – April 2011

Creative team
- Writer(s): Paul Grist
- Artist(s): Paul Grist
- Letterer(s): Paul Grist
- Colorist(s): Phil Elliott

Jack Staff is a British superhero created by comic book writer/artist Paul Grist. While the title character is billed as "Britain's Greatest Hero", the series is known for being in the style of an anthology title and featuring an ensemble cast, largely inspired by extant American and British characters from comics and other mediums. The series was first published in 2000 via Grist's own Dancing Elephant Press, before moving to American publisher Image Comics in 2003.

== Creation ==
While various sources have stated the series began as a reworked pitch for a series about the Marvel Comics character Union Jack, Grist would later clarify that this was only partially true, having gone no further than an enquiry as to whether Marvel would be interested in a series featuring the character. Having previously worked for Marvel on the 1996 limited series The Daily Bugle, Grist had picked Union Jack off a list of obscure Marvel characters, and was unaware at the time that Union Jack had recently been revived in a 1998 mini-series by Ben Raab and John Cassaday. Serious work on the story did not begin until after the decision was made to create Jack Staff as an original series though part of the first arc was influenced by a 1980s Captain America storyline featuring Union Jack and Baron Blood; Grist was only able to find part of the storyline at the time, so built an alternate conclusion instead.

The series was heavily influenced by the anthology format of British weekly comics produced by Fleetway Publications and DC Thomson, which featured several short serial episodes in each issue. The difference, Grist explained, was that the characters in Jack Staff frequently crossed over into each other's strips. This influenced by several characters being overt homages to classic British comic characters, including the Spider and the Steel Claw, while others were based on vintage television shows such as Steptoe and Son and Dad's Army.

== Publication history ==
Grist initially published the series through his own Dancing Elephant Press imprint, with mainly black-and-white interiors. Strong reception led to the series being picked up by Image Comics, who switched it to full colour. The final Dancing Elephant issue was an extended 32 page special, finishing plot points from the first volume; unusually, it was published after the first issue of the Image series. The series soon became notorious for its irregular schedule, which remained unchanged after the move to Image. The second volume lasted 20 issues. In 2005, Comics International began exclusive publication of a monthly four-page strip featuring the supporting character Ben Kulmer (the Claw); this started in #185 of the magazine and ran for twelve episodes; these were subsequently collected in an Image one-shot called The Weird World of Jack Staff King-Size Special.

A crossover was planned between Jack Staff and Invincible, with Grist drawing and Robert Kirkman writing, but scheduling problems prevented it. Jack Staff himself had already appeared in a cameo in an earlier issue of the title, at the memorial service for the slain Guardians of the Globe, and later helping to defend the Earth from an army of other-dimensional Invincible doubles. A crossover with Savage Dragon also took place, in which Dragon visited Castletown as part of a storyline in which the character searched the world for his missing wife.

The series was relaunched as The Weird World of Jack Staff in 2010. Grist explained that the relaunch was driven partly by an attempt to allay confusion on the part of new readers to the anthology style of the series, noting that many were perplexed by issues often only featuring Jack Staff in a small role. Despite solicitations being published for two further issues, The Weird World of Jack Staff ended prematurely after six issues, with Grist instead focusing on Mudman.

In 2019, Grist would get his chance to actually work on Union Jack, writing new series The Union; after being delayed by the COVID-19 pandemic it was finally published in 2020. After an 11-year hiatus from the character, Grist contributed a new eight-page Jack Staff strip to the Image Comics 30th anniversary anthology Image! in 2022, appearing in the seventh issue.

== Plot ==
=== Yesterday's Heroes ===
Castletown has recently been buffeted by a storm caused by supervillain Doc Tempest before he was taken down by hero Tom-Tom the Robot Man, while the city is also being haunted by a serial killer dubbed the Castledown Slasher. Reporter Becky Burdock meanwhile is narrowly saved from a falling sign thanks to the fast reaction of builder John Smith. Burdock is investigating the disappearance of British superhero Jack Staff for tabloid newspaper The World's Press. Jack Staff was a prominent figure of World War II who performed heroically in the aftermath of the 'Castledown Blitz' as part of the Freedom Fighters but who hasn't been sighted since 1980; however, her editor Gerald Skinner is unmoved and redirects her to reporting on the Slasher. The killings have also attracted the attention of Helen Morgan, Ben Kulmer (a.k.a. The Claw) and Harry Crane - Fortean investigators Q. Using Helen as bait, they draw out a suspect, who is cornered by Tom-Tom and confesses to the killings. However, Tom-Tom is able to detect that the man is lying. Tom-Tom and Becky both converge on a scream, and find Jack Staff standing over Helen's body. Before he can explain he is flattened by Tom-Tom, who only stops his attack when D.I. Maveryk of the police turns up to arrest Jack. However, Crane also arrives and pulls rank, getting Jack handed over to Q instead. Under interrogation, Jack tells Crane his name and that he has seen similar killings in 1940, and the archives of World War II intelligence agency Unit D confirm his story before American hero Sgt. States turns up to vouch for Jack. Burdock is informed of Jack's release, and begins to realise that he and Smith are one and the same. Back at his home, Jack tells his old comrade that he has returned to action to investigate Templar Richard. Burdock attempts to confront Smith, but is killed by a shadowy figure. She awakens to find local vampire hunter Albert Bramble about to drive a stake through her heart; Bramble had been saved from Templar Richard by the Freedom Fighters in August 1940. In the present, Jack Staff and Sgt. States head to Richard's old lair, with the American suffering bouts of nausea. Above ground, Bramble and his son Harold tell Becky she was killed by a vampire and is now one herself, though Harold refuses to let his father kill her. She claims her killer was Sgt. States, while below Jack finds Templar's body unmoved from 1940 as a vampiric Sgt. States leaps at him. The American military is complicit in his vampirism and turns back Maveryk and Q when they arrive at the caverns in pursuit of Jack, so Crane calls in Tom-Tom, while Becky is also drawn to the caverns. Their attacks give Jack a chance to kill Sgt. States. After the fight, John and Becky discover than inside Tom-Tom is a young girl, and get her to safety. Maveryk attempts to arrest Jack Staff for the murder of Becky, but is forced to let him go due to her survival, while American authorities cover up the Sgt. States fiasco.

=== Everything Used to Be Black and White ===
Patricia 'Trisha' Carthy, the paraplegic pilot of Tom-Tom, is recuperating in Castledown Royal Infirmary, where Tempest - having deduced her identity - tries to kill her, only to accidentally propel her wheelchair into his face, paralysing himself. Crane meanwhile returns home to find Helen Morgan waiting for him, alive and well. Helen explains that Q brought her back to life, and persuades Crane to remain working for Q. John meanwhile arrives at the home of the elderly Alfred Chinard to carry out some building work, but the man leads him into a pit. He comes around to find he is now wearing his Jack Staff costume, and realises that Chinard is notorious criminal the Spider, who robbed the Bank of England in 1986, leading to the shutdown of Unit D. Maveryk gains a new partner in D.S. 'Zipper' Nolan as he investigates a theft. After finding the Spider's calling card he decides to set a trap for the super-criminal. The Spider himself is after Jack's help as one of his suits has been stolen, and could be dangerous in the wrong hands. Meanwhile Becky is being chased by the Hounds of Hell, set on her by the mysterious Man of Shadows; she tries to call Jack for help, but he and the Spider are busy walking into Maveryk's trap while tracking the thief to the Eisner Building. They capture him, but the Spider knocks Jack out and leaves him as the Maveryk arrives. Becky meanwhile is saved by Harold Bramble; the Man of Shadows tells her she has to pick a side in a war before vanishing.

Another serial killer arrives in Castletown, this time seemingly mimicking the organ-stealing methods depicted in The Jigsaw Man by author Iain M. Angel, also in town. Maveryk arrests the writer at a signing, as his recent tour coincides with the killings. John is also arrested by Maveryk, but Helen and Ben realise the real killer is a mystical concept attempting to build itself a body. With help from the mystical Druid they are able to stop the Jigsaw Man from becoming corporeal. Becky angrily confronts John for not helping her when under threat of the Shadow, but their bickering is stopped when his colleague unearths a coffin. Becky's editor turns the opening of the coffin into a publicity event, involving a £10,000 prize for guessing the contents, model Lynda Jones and a host of others. Doctor Spex's x-ray eyes are unable to penetrate the casket, and neither are Morlan the Mystic's psychic senses before the event is crashed by thief the Claw and the Spider, who steals the prize in the resulting confusion. The coffin also comes open, revealing its contents to be the still-living Victorian escapologist Charlie Raven. Meanwhile Maveryk and Nolan are called to the town nursing home, where worker Hannah Noone has been found aged to death despite only being 22. Meanwhile Raven escapes from police custody. Raven was trapped by a Time Leech after he refused to ally with its plans for world domination, which were delayed when its human form - a dark-haired woman - suffered amnesia but has recently reawakened in Castletown, revitalising itself with Noone's life-force. Raven visits Becky for help. On their way through town they run into the woman in a bank that is in the process of being robbed. Acting on a tip-off from Becky, John is also in the bank and attempts to stop the robbers as Jack Staff but they take Becky hostage. Jack, Maveryk, Raven and the woman are locked in the vault together but Raven is able to get them out. Jack finds the mysterious woman not breathing, and she vanishes when he tries to resuscitate her. Raven also vanishes, while Becky dresses down Jack for the weirdness he brings to her life. Meanwhile, back in its original form the Time Leech plots its return.

=== Soldiers ===
In 1981, Britain's secret Hurricane escapes and rampages towards Castletown. its progress is tracked by Project H commander Malone. The Hurricane is an enraged, powerful superhuman known as the Hurricane, and is met two miles outside town by Jack Staff, who he beats easily. Jack wakes up to find ally Mister Green on the scene, claiming to be unable to intervene. Exasperated, he follows the trail of destruction to the city centre, where he is able to use an ice cream truck to save a young Becky from Hurricane. As Malone is responsible for creating Hurricane - an officer by the name of Colonel Gust who had anger issues which were augmented by Storm Damage - he decides to kill all the witnesses, using the miniature military forces controlled by another Project H asset, General Tubbs. Tubbs' weapons force Jack and Becky into the sewers, where they are again confronted by Hurricane. Malone's subordinate Stewart expresses concern about overtaxing Tubbs, but the commander pulls a gun on her, takes Tubbs' remote and drops into Castletown to finish the job. However, Malone was unaware that Tubbs controlled the machines with his mind and that the remote was merely a prop. Having learnt about Hurricane's power from Malone, Jack uses his powers to drain the excess anger from Gust, returning him to normal. He is berated by Mister Green, who had intentionally released Hurricane as a potential ally in a forthcoming cosmic war. Disgusted at the attitude of both Mister Green and Malone, Jack Staff quits. The true cause of the damage is covered up by the government, who instead blame it on an earthquake.

Twenty years later, Castletown is hit by a spike in rage-based crimes - Kane is present as a blind man beats a helpful youth to death, Tom Tom causes huge property damage and hospitalises minor villain Shock! while John has to save Becky from a murderous mob. Jack and Becky compare notes with Trisha, who has no memory of Tom Tom's rampage, but they are menaced by more of the townspeople. Meanwhile Maveryk also falls victim to the rage and kills Helen, who once again comes back to life and shares her theories about the causes of the anger with Q and the police, realising the link with the events of 1981. Jack, Becky and Trisha are saved by Commander Hawkes, former leader of Unit D, who teleports them and a man attacked by the mob to his Thunder Ship. They get the man to hospital, where Hawkes discovers he has no records. The hospital is then hit by a blackout; they come under attack from the Claw, and are joined by Stewart. Now commander of intelligence agency S.M.I.L.E., she has also realised the attacks are linked to the Hurricane, and that the injured man is actually Gust. The Claw escapes, having acted as a decoy so Helen could take Gust away. Q assemble at the Quake Circle, a roundabout decorated with debris from Hurricane's attack in 1981. There, Helen is able to transfer the rage back into Gust, who she then suggests would make a good ally for Q.

=== Echoes of Tomorrow ===
In 1942, the Freedom Fighters are called to Castletown, where a German soldier has been found dead. The team come under fire from a nearby house and investigate. Jack discovers a lab inside ran by his enemy Brain Head, who has used a teleporter to bring the German superhero Kapitan Krieg to the town. One by one the team are knocked out by Krieg and captured. Brain Head explains to the captive Freedom Fighters he plans to teleport the German army to Castletown as revenge for the way he feels the country has treated him, also getting to transfer his mind to Krieg's body as a reward. However, Jack and Sgt. States are able to get free. Krieg also turns on Brain Head, giving Jack an opening to destroy the machine. Struggling with some sort of possession, Krieg allows Jack and Sgt. Stripes to get team-mates Blazing Glory and Tommy Twister out of the house, which then implodes.

In the present day, a cult leader hires Bramble & Son to capture Becky, a job that Harold reluctantly accepts. She is taken to sacrificial ceremony, where Harold and Arthur turn on the cultists, only for the trio to be trapped. The Shadow offers Becky help to escape, but she refuses to leave Harold. The cult leader then kills himself as the sacrifice, and a block of vampires arrive and proclaim her the 'Bringer of the Night'; she bluntly refuses to lead them. Helen Morgan meanwhile experiences recurring dreams featuring Mister Green, which warn her something will be happening at the town's branch of Tesco.

Maveryk meanwhile investigates a murder at the home of polymath Lord Gilbert Pearce MP, who masquerades as a police officer and captures Maveryk, proclaiming he has been set up. Tom Tom attempts a rescue, but Pierce slips away and hides in plain sight as one of the town's homeless. Elsewhere, Ben Kulmer continues to commit theft in his spare time, but is being hunted by Mason and his pink-clad assassin for stealing the Claw in the first place. 'Zipper' Nolan is also suffering ominous dreams, featuring his childhood imaginary friends and a battle between the Druid, Lord Nod and the sinister Jim Bones.

John is accosted in Tesco by Morlan the Mystic, who has had visions of Jack Staff losing a battle against a powerful foe. Sure enough, in the car park the cosmic hero known as the Eternal Warrior appears through a portal. Smith is able to best the Warrior after a long fight, but it turns out the real danger is Brain Head's house, sent forward in time. Kapitan Kreig is still inside, unaged and possessed by the demon. After Helen's visions warn her of events, Kane and Kulmer arrive in the car park and try to reason with Krieg, who swipes out one of Kane's eyes in response. He is even able to see the invisible Kulmer, and blows a hole in Tom-Tom when the hero tries to help. Despite Hans' efforts to regain control and Jack's efforts to fight him, Vorty Krill emerges in his own body, and declares himself conqueror of Tesco. Helen arrives and battles Krill, who takes possession of the Eternal Warrior's body. However, the cosmic hero is able to drive the creature out, and it is eaten by Morlun before it can take another host. The Eternal Warrior returns to patrolling the cosmos and John buries old enemy Krieg.

=== Rocky Realities ===
A being called Molachi the Immortal seeks the Star Stone, but is beheaded by the Eternal Warrior. Meanwhile John is struck by dreams of himself standing over the head body of Helen Morgan and then battling an armoured figure. The Star Stone resurfaces in a museum, where Ben Kulmer prepares to steal it - only for Molachi to turn up with a new cyborg body, which Becky has unwittingly repaired. Jack turns up as well but - thanks to having another cloned self as an ally - Molachi is able to take the Star Stone and signal the Nagarik for an invasion of Earth. However, as the invasion was planned to take place a thousand years beforehand the Nagarik have moved on to other things and are no longer interested. In the confusion, Kulmer sneaks away with both the Star Stone and the sword.

In an alternate reality, Jack is Britain's greatest criminal - and a former romantic partner of Becky Burdock, vampire hunter - the pair had a son named Matthew, who was killed by vampires. She has a creeping suspicion something is not right, and this is confirmed when Temporal Reality Agent Rocky Reality appears to mend the timeline. They meet the regular Becky, and the alternate version is less than happy at the idea that she should have been a vampire. Against her wishes, Jack uses a reality rock to change the reality and things seemingly go back to normal. However, a vampire version of Alfred Bramble has crossed over from the alternate reality.

Nolan receives a tip-off that the villain Mister Punch will be outside the swanky restaurant Tuppers, where John is having dinner with model Lynda Jones. Their meal is crashed by Punch, and John changes to Jack Staff and fights the villain without success. Nolan plans to intervene and is seemingly knocked out - but when he comes around Punch has been dealt with, seemingly by his childhood imaginary friends Dish and Goldie. Another of Nolan's childhood heroes, the Druid, appears at Nolan's home, and is distraught to find he is only a comic character. Elsewhere, Albert is attacked by his vampire doppelganger, while Becky visits Harold, who shares some of the Brambles' vampire literature with her and then unwittingly invites the vampire Albert into his home. To save Harold from the vampire, Becky is forced to make a deal with the Man of Shadows, who brings Alfred back to life. Rocky Reality then appears and is successfully able to correct the timeline, returning Alfred to normal, while the Shadow tells Becky she is now in his debt. Kulmer meanwhile is captured by old enemy Sommerset Stone, but his captor is killed by old employer Mason and his assassin. Kulmer finds the Claw seems to be acting to protect him, and kills Mason.

While this is happening, John is accused of armed robbery, and Maveryk attempts to bring him in with the aid of Tom-Tom. He swears his innocence, but Jack and Tom Tom are attacked by Shock! Shock! takes out Tom-Tom and Jack before being confronted by another hero called The Butler, who helps Jack defeat the villain. Trisha is convinced of Jack's innocence and has Tom-Tom fly him away from the police. At her base, Jack realises the real robber is a shape-shifter. Searching for him, Maveryk and Nolan head to the Costello Academy for gifted children, where the Head Master takes over Maveryk's mind with his telepathy. However, another of Nolan's imaginary friends, Mister Balloons, appears to save him. When the Head Master attempts to control Nolan's mind, he recoils at what he sees. Elsewhere a group of superpowered students, including the shapeshifter, capture Trisha. Jack follows and seeing him alongside the shapeshifter as John convinces Maveryk, before the students use their abilities to escape. Later, Zipper's friends order pizza, but unknown to them the delivery boy is attacked by Mister Bones.

=== The Weird World of Jack Staff ===
In 1875, Charlie Raven is trapped by fellow music hall act Professor Fate at the Empire Theatre in Castledown. Fate, wearing the Mask of Destiny, goes on stage and picks a man from the audience called John Smith, who has been "chosen by the fates". Raven begins to escape from Fate's trap, despite a stagehand unwittingly detonating an explosive device. On stage, Fate places Smith in a cabinet, and when he emerges the man has energy coursing off him. Fate attempts to siphon the power off him in order to wield the Sword of Devastation but realises he has chosen the wrong man. Raven confronts Fate, and Smith flees as the theatre catches fire. It burns to the ground, with Raven escaping and Fate trapped underground.

In 1973 at Castletown's Alternate Energy Research Centre, Jack Staff and Unit D battle the Skull, an energy-powered alien being who Jack overloads and seemingly destroys it.

In the present, Commander Hawkes attempts to find John to warn him of the return of the Skull. However, John seems to have three weeks missing from his life - and no recollection of being Jack Staff. Instead Becky attempts to talk him down, claiming Jack Staff has not been seen until 1981, and has some success until Maveryk arrives with armed police - giving the game away about John into the bargain. Tom Tom arrives and attacks the Skull, watched by Fate - who has awakened in the recently refurbished theatre. Becky decapitates the villain with a sledgehammer, and John's memory partly returns, allowing Jack Staff to help her. The pair begin to investigate the gaps in John's memory, which include missing a date with calendar model Lynda Jones - triggering more of his memories. They go to confront her at her book launch. Fate is buried again when the battle between the Skull and Tom Tom collapses the theatre, also burying construction worker Andrew Owens, who is discovered by Tom Tom wearing the Mask of Destiny.

Meeting Lynda restores John's memory. Three weeks earlier, Jack had attempted to foil a theft at the town museum by the Claw, with help from the Butler. However, during the fight Jack is taken out of time by an armoured figure, who transports him to "the end of everything". Professor Fate and Morlan the Mystic also watch on the latter's television. They see "the Destroyer" wearing the complete Valiant Stone among the ruins of Castletown, killing a battered Jack before being challenged by Becky, clad in a green cloak and carrying the Sword of Devastation. The villain spots the observers, and smashes the time-traveller's helmet - revealing her to be Lynda Jones, Calendar Girl. She is a Clock Cop charged with making sure the time stream, and transports them both back to the present - where Lynda bemoans that everything has gone wrong. Fate is able to use the Mask to take control of Andrew, having realised the true champion he was searching for was Becky all along. The Devil with an Angel's face arrives in Castletown and confronts John, Lynda and Becky; Jack battles him but is stabbed saving Becky's life. Lynda puts the area in a time lock and opens a portal to the Sword of Devastation but Andrew arrives and passes the Mask of Destiny to Becky. She is able to reject the Mask's control. Jack berates Lynda for meddling, noting that none of this would have happened if she hadn't taken him out of time, and collects the Mask.

== Collected editions ==
Title	Publisher	ISBN	Release date	Contents
Jack Staff - Yesterday's Heroes	Dancing Elephant Press	0954226402	April 2002	Jack Staff v1 #1-4
Jack Staff Volume 1 - Everything Used to be Black and White	Image Comics	158240335X	March 2004	Jack Staff v1 #1-12
Jack Staff Volume 2 - Soldiers	Image Comics	1582403929	November 2005	Jack Staff v2 #1-5
Jack Staff Volume 3 - Echoes of Tomorrow	Image Comics	1582407193	January 2007	Jack Staff v2 #6-12
Jack Staff Volume 4 - Rocky Realities	Image Comics	1607061481	January 2007	Jack Staff v2 #13-20 & Special #1

== Reception ==
Despite low sales, Jack Staff consistently drew strong critical acclaim. Writing for ComicsAlliance, both Benito Cereno and Chris Sims praised Grist's draughtsmanship, characterisation and storytelling on the series. Sims called it "hands down one of the best comics ever printed". Four years later he stood by the description, and again noted Grist's ability to blend inventive artistic techniques with intelligent superhero stories.

Charles Murphy of TGR praised the central character's moral compass and the depiction of the British in general in the series, something also picked up on by Matthew Meylikhov in an article for Multiversity Comics. Meylikhov also noted the series' pace and rich characters. In his book British Comics - A Cultural History, James Chapman noted the series' ability to keep a strong British identity, something he felt was comparable to the sensibilities of Grant Morrison's Zenith.

=== Awards ===
- 2001: Won "Favourite British Small Press Title" Eagle Award
- 2002: Nominated for "Best Self-Published/Independent" National Comics Award
- 2003:
  - Won "Best Self-Published/Independent" National Comics Award
  - Nominated for "Best New Comic" National Comics Award
- 2005: Nominated for "Favourite British Small Press Title" Eagle Award
- 2007: Nominated for "Favourite Colour Comicbook (American)" Eagle Award
