= Who Wants to Be a Superhero? =

American reality TV series

- Stan Lee and the contestants of Season 2
- Genre: Reality super heroes
- Created by: Stan Lee; Bruce Nash
- Directed by: Rick Telles
- Presented by: Stan Lee
- Judges: Stan Lee
- Narrated by: Stan Lee
- Country of origin: United States
- Original language: English
- No. of seasons: 2
- No. of episodes: 14

Production
- Executive producers: Bruce Nash; Stan Lee; Scott Satin; Andrew Jebb; Gill Champion; Andy Sheer
- Producers: Tess Gamboa; Walk Omiecinski
- Running time: 60 minutes
- Production companies: Sci-Fi Channel; Nash Entertainment; POW! Entertainment

Original release
- Network: Sci Fi
- Release: July 26, 2006 – September 6, 2007

Related
- UK version; Stan Lee's Superhumans

Who Wants to Be a Superhero? is a superhero genre reality TV series that was broadcast on the Sci-Fi Channel (now SyFy) produced by Nash Entertainment and POW! Entertainment. The show was created by Stan Lee and Nash Entertainment. A junior version of the show was broadcast on BBC Two/CBBC in the UK.

== Premise ==
Potential contestants auditioned as their super hero selves. The final 10 selected were then placed in common quarters. The contestants were then tested for superhero traits. Lee was the only judge and would instruct the eliminated contestant: “Turn in your costume”. He also mentored the contestants and made appearances, primarily on TV screens, on a giant plasma at the top of a tower block, a monitor resting in the middle of a pile of trash, or on individually issued "communicators". The winner's character concept would be the star of a Stan Lee scripted Dark Horse comic book and a TV movie for the Sci-Fi Channel.

== Production ==
Stan Lee and Bruce Nash developed the concept. In 2004, MTV was considering televising the show, even holding the regional auditions. The show moved to the Sci Fi Channel two years later with the pitch well-received when they were told that Stan would judge.

The show was renewed for a second season with hints of another country might get a junior version of the show. Jarrett Crippen, aka the Defuser, won the second season.

== US season 1 ==
At the Los Angeles 2004 auditions, Matthew Atherton applied as Knightbeam, powered from artificial light. Atherton reapplied as Feedback and was originally selected as an alternative.

Some filmed challenges were cut from the show. The first challenge (1a) was from Rotiart, a plant from Lee, who talked to the contestants to find out who was there for the right reasons. The next challenge (1b) was to discreetly change into costume and then race to a finish line, with a secret part being to help a lost little girl.

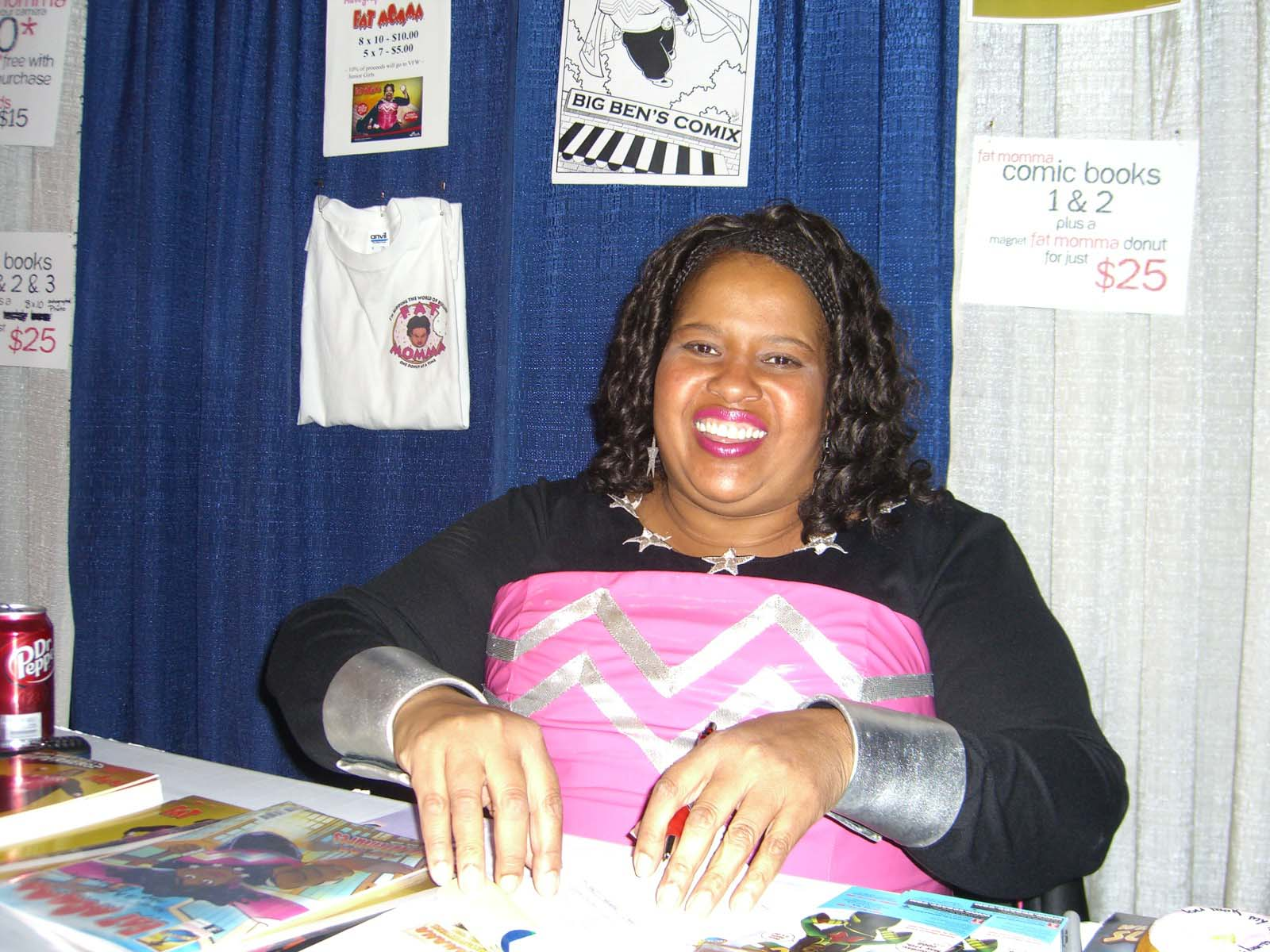
Nell Wilson (Fat Momma) at the 2008 New York Comic Con.

The three finalists had their potential comic book cover shown to them. Then they had the challenge of getting school children to vote for them after telling them their origin story. Fat Momma won the children's vote. The next challenge was to track down Dark Enforcer at Universal CityWalk via planned clues with Major Victory winning. Fat Momma wanted to quit, as she felt Feedback deserved it more, but was convinced to stick it out by the other two. Major Victory was then eliminated.

Feedback won the first season over Fat Momma. The top three, winner Feedback, runners-up Fat Momma and Major Victory, were made into action figures by Shocker Toys released along with the season two's figures. Feedback appeared in the 2007 Sci Fi channel film Mega Snake.

Key:

Superhero completed the task
Superhero was nominated for elimination
Superhero was eliminated
Superhero won

Superhero	Secret Identity	Concept	1a	1b	2a	2b	3a	3b	4a	4b	5	6
Feedback ♂	Matthew Atherton Software engineer 34 years old Las Cruces, New Mexico	Absorb powers from video game characters/generate a feedback field that disrupts electronics within 15 feet/computer genius	IN	IN	IN	NOM	IN	IN	IN	IN	IN	WIN
Fat Momma ♀	Nell Wilson Online sales specialist/single mother 42 years old Los Angeles, California	Grows to 5X her normal size when angry/eating a doughnut activates other powers	IN	IN	IN	IN	IN	NOM	NOM	IN	IN	OUT
Major Victory ♂	Chris Watters Disc jockey 38 years old San Francisco, California	Super strength/flight/super jump/survive without air/super vision/manipulate sound waves	IN	IN	IN	IN	IN	IN	NOM	NOM	OUT	
Lemuria ♀	Tonatzin Mondragon Property manager/artist/sculptor 30 years old Los Angeles, California	Shoot lasers/shoot fireballs/levitation/drain energy from people, animals, and plants/throw orbs of solar energy	IN	IN	IN	IN	IN	IN	IN	OUT		
Creature ♀	Tonya Kay Automobile mechanic 25 years old Coldwater, Michigan	Can heal others with fruit and raw foods/shoot fire beams/magical bullwhip/throws knives with unerring precision	NOM	IN	NOM	IN	IN	IN	OUT			
Ty'Veculus ♂	E. Quincy Sloan Fire captain 34 years old Bakersfield, California	Super strength/super speed/fire resistance/lie detection	IN	IN	IN	NOM	IN	OUT				
Monkey Woman ♀	Mary Votava Real estate investor 28 years old Seattle, Washington	Skills of a monkey/talk to monkeys/high-tech weapons disguised as bananas/bamboo staff	IN	NOM	IN	IN	OUT					
The Iron Enforcer ♂	Steel Chambers Bodyguard 35 years old Brooklyn, New York	Densest bone structure of any human/death punch/various high-tech weapons	NOM	NOM	NOM	OUT						
Cell Phone Girl ♀	Chelsea Weld Interior designer 22 years old La Crescenta, California	Teleport from one cell phone to another/eyes can take digital photos/mentally download information from a computer/use cell phone waves to move objects and shoot laser beams	IN	IN	OUT							
Nitro G ♂	Darren Passarello College student/filmmaker 19 years old Staten Island, New York	Super strength/super speed/flight/energy manipulation	IN	OUT								
Levity ♂	Tobias Trost Toy designer/animator 32 years old Lakeside, Montana	Force shields/aerokinesis	OUT									
Rotiart ♂	Jonathan Finestone Business owner 27 years old Los Angeles, California	Spy cameras	plant/spy for Lee, not a true contestant									

== US season 2 ==
Two or three villains, Dr. Dark and Bee Sting, were used in this season and there was an overarching story line. In addition to the first season rewards of a Stan Lee written comic book published by Dark Horse and a Sci Fi Original movie appearance, the winning character would also get a Shocker Toys action figure.

Jarrett Crippen's character was originally named Take Down, but as that name was trademarked by a wrestler, Stan Lee chose "The Defuser" after discussing his job as a police detective. Crippen finished filming for his character's movie appearance by January 15, 2009. The movie, Lightning Strikes, also starred Kevin Sorbo.

Key:

Superhero completed the task
Superhero was nominated for elimination
Superhero was eliminated
Superhero won

A plus sign indicates that the hero was singled out for praise by Lee in that episode.

Superhero	Secret Identity	Concept	1	2	3a	3b	4	5	6	7	8
The Defuser ♂	Jarret Crippen Police detective Austin, Texas	Use non-lethal weapons/body can function at 110%/super strength/super speed/enhanced reflexes/super hearing/night vision	IN	IN	IN	IN	NOM	NOM	IN	NOM	WIN
Hygena ♀	Melody Mooney Homemaker Sherman Oaks, California	Use a magic necklace to turn cleaning tools into weapons	IN+	IN+	IN+	IN	NOM	NOM	NOM	NOM	OUT
Hyper-Strike ♂	John Stork Circus performer Plainfield, Vermont/Chicago, Illinois	Martial arts expert/super strength/enhanced durability/enhanced agility/can manipulate own qi	IN	IN	IN	NOM	IN	IN+	NOM	NOM	OUT
Parthenon ♂	Dan Williams College professor Orlando, Florida	Super strength/invulnerability/flight/force-field generation/sonic blast/illusion creation	IN+	IN	IN+	IN	IN+	IN	OUT		
Whip-Snap ♀	Paula Thomas Security officer Dallas, Texas/Los Angeles, California	Expert at using a whip/increased flexibility/decomposing touch/absorbs strength from the Earth	IN+	IN	IN	IN	IN	OUT			
Basura ♀	Aja de Coudreaux Artist Oakland, California	Use magic to turn trash into weapons/communicate with insects	IN+	IN	NOM	NOM	OUT				
Ms. Limelight ♀	Trisha Paytas Barista Byron, Illinois/Los Angeles, California	Absorb the powers and skills of action stars from movies/fantastic swimmer/sense people's weaknesses/use a mirror to temporarily blind foes	NOM	NOM	NOM	OUT					
Mr. Mitzvah ♂	Ivan "Sir Ivan" Wilzig Multi-millionaire Miami, Florida/New York City	Star of David paddle that can deflect any attack/super strength/flight/night vision/super senses	NOM	NOM	OUT						
Mindset ♂	Phillip Allen Cashier Coral Springs, Florida	Super intelligence/telekinesis/time travel/indestructible armor/sense danger/excellent problem solver	IN	OUT							
Braid ♀	Crystal Clark Homemaker/Former CIA Bloomington, Illinois	Use hair extensions as a zip line/shape-shifting/super smell/can change into her costume using a prism stone	OUT								

== UK season 1 ==
In the UK version, 13 children competed in superhero persona; it was broadcast on CBBC.
