= Feedback (Dark Horse Comics) =

American superhero comic book character

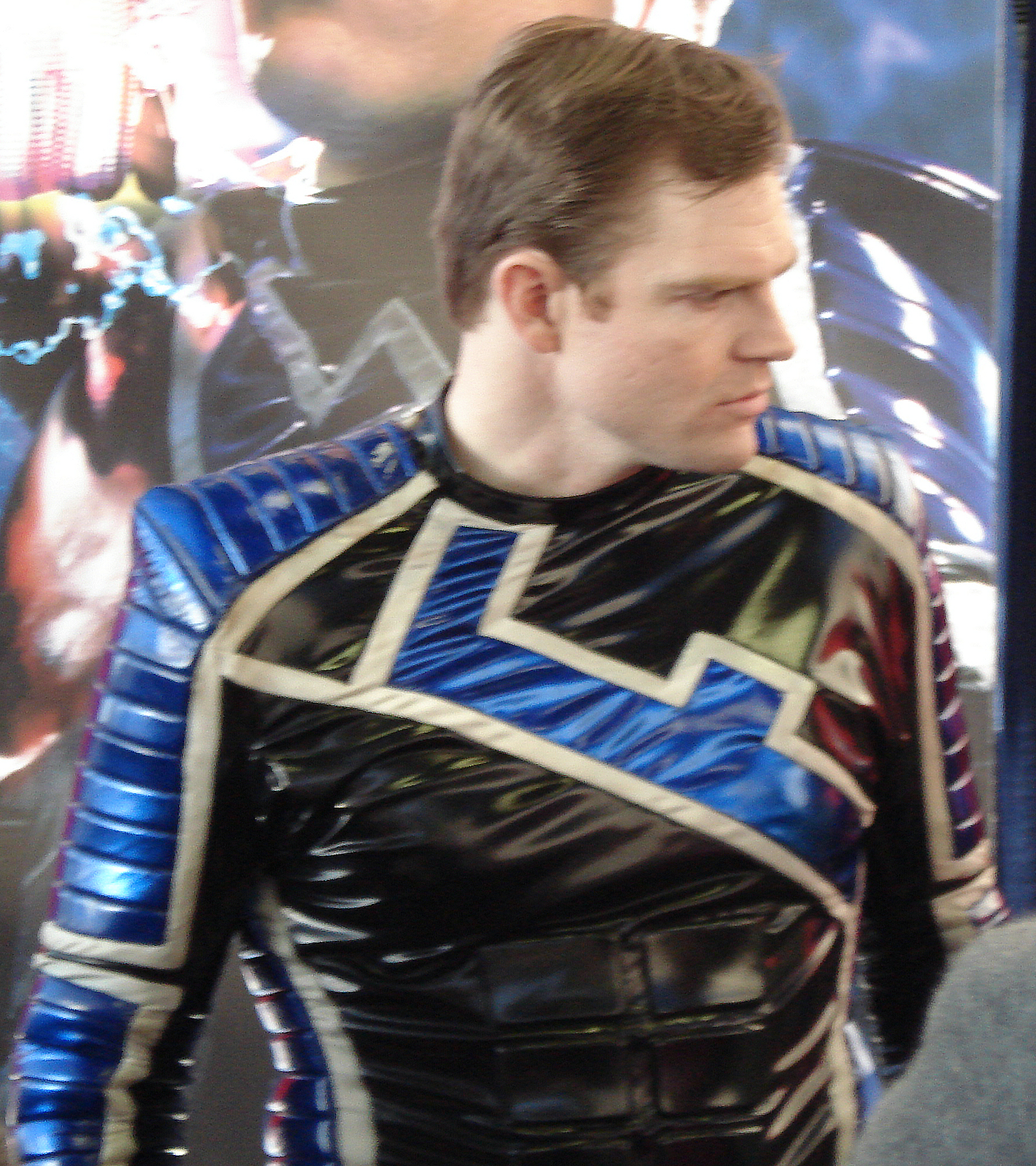
- Matthew Atherton as Feedback at the 2007 New York Comic Con.

Publication information
- Publisher: Dark Horse Comics
- First appearance: Who Wants to Be a Superhero?
- Created by: Matthew Atherton

In-story information
- Alter ego: Matthew Atherton
- Abilities: Energy projection Use of damping suit and electronic gadgets Ability to disrupt electrical equipment and receive powers from playing a video game

Feedback is a superhero created and originally portrayed by actor Matthew Atherton on the reality television series Who Wants to Be a Superhero? As a result of winning the show, his character was made the subject of a Dark Horse Comics comic book written by Stan Lee. He also made a guest appearance in the Sci-Fi Channel original movie Mega Snake. He also has his own audio series written by and starring Atherton. The first episode of which was produced in collaboration with amateur audio groups Darker Projects and is now a continuing audio series hosted by BrokenSea Audio Productions.

== Matthew Atherton ==
Matthew Atherton is a software engineer from Las Cruces, NM. He quit his job to take part in the show. He was 34 years old during season one. After the death of his father by suicide (when Matthew was 14), superheroes like Spider-Man became Matthew's role models. Atherton graduated from Grinnell College in 1995.

== Fictional character history ==
While working on a bio-organic computer system using organic computing, software engineer Matthew Atherton is caught in a large explosion that bombards his body with hi-tech cellular shrapnel. Atherton discovers that his body is generating a feedback field that shuts down nearby electronic equipment. Atherton creates a damping suit that keeps the field in check and becomes Dark Horse Comic's new superhero "Feedback." His catchphrase is "Okay, lecture's over—time for some Feedback!"

Atherton also discovers that by playing video games, he can absorb some attributes of the game. For example, if Feedback plays Prince of Persia: The Sands of Time, he temporarily gains the ability to run along walls and do acrobatics, and perhaps rewind time. By using an organization created by his former employer known as "Tech Support", Feedback gains enough knowledge to use the limited powers wisely. Each time Feedback uses a power, he loses some of his memory.

However, both the Dark Horse comic and the Sci-Fi Channel original movie Mega Snake failed to feature Feedback's ability to use video game powers. This may be due to intellectual property rights surrounding commercial video games. While the comic did feature Feedback's electricity-wielding abilities, Mega Snake did not show any of his powers at all.

=== Comic book origin ===
Computer whiz Matthew Atherton is tricked by Ironside, the world's deadliest terrorist, into helping him perfect an unstoppable robot vehicle, little knowing that Ironside intends to use the vehicle to destroy Matthew's hometown. Left for dead by the terrorists, an unexpected event turns Matthew into Feedback, giving him one chance to redeem himself and save the city.

== Equipment and powers ==
Feedback is equipped with many pieces of technology and several superpowers.

=== Equipment ===
- Damping Suit: Made of high-tech fabric and designed by Atherton himself. The suit, when activated, can generate a field that counters the disruptive nature of the feedback field. It also allows Feedback to absorb powers from video games.
- Body Armor: Not being bullet-proof, Feedback's original costume included a layer of body armor. The new costume now incorporates "FlexTek" body armor into the damping suit.
- Feedback Field Monitor: This wrist device monitors the "feedback field" that gives Feedback his powers. It can be activated by voice-command ("Game on!") to turn off the field inhibitor of the damping suit and also indicates the remaining "charge" that exists before the feedback field reverts to its normal disruptive state.

=== Powers ===
- Force Feedback Power Emulation: Feedback has the ability to absorb special abilities and/or powers by playing certain video games. After "jacking into" a modified game console, the special suit acts as an adapter that transfers the powers of a video-game character directly to him, but only for a limited duration. 1 hour of game play normally equates to 10 minutes of power emulation. However, there are consequences to using these powers (see weaknesses below).
- Feedback Field: Although Feedback perceives this more as a nuisance than a power, this "Feedback Field" can be useful against foes that rely on technological gadgets. The field completely disrupts electronic equipment that is within 15 feet of Feedback. Anything that has a microprocessor will altogether cease to operate within this field. At up to 25 feet, this field will cause computers and electronic devices to malfunction. The field is always on. Feedback has no means of controlling it, other than wearing his damping suit. The field does shut off, however, when he is "charged" from playing games.
- Feedback Blast: Feedback has the ability to generate from his hands a very powerful blast of concentrated electrical energy. This blast is extremely shocking and can be very dangerous to use. Feedback uses his electric powers to shock his enemies and never uses them to harm civilians.

=== Weaknesses ===
- Energy Weakness: High-energy fields react with the "Feedback Field" and cause incredible pain. Power lines cause headaches, microwaves cause nausea. Energy-beam weapons cause more damage than normal.
- Weakness Emulation: Feedback inherits the weaknesses of the character he is emulating as well as the powers.
- Power Charge: 1 hour of continuous game play is required to emulate powers for 10 minutes, so Feedback must decide in the morning what game to play, which (more often than not) is completely inappropriate for the challenges he'll face that day.
- Memory Loss: Whenever Feedback uses an emulated power, the exertion results in the loss of a random part of his memory.
- Unpredictable Charge: If a foreign game console is used to get an "Immediate Boost", the results are always unpredictable and often negative.

== Tech Support ==
Tech Support is an elite group that provides reconnaissance and research assistance, as well as field support where required. They often research games that would give Feedback the powers necessary for a given task. Also, they are attempting to discover why he is losing his memory, as well as how to retrieve it. They are officially recognized by Feedback as his sidekicks.

Tech Support is the fictional parallel of Feedback's fan club of the same name, with characters created by his fans. Atherton has expressed public support for the group as a fan club and as a part of his backstory. However, this has not been approved by those who now hold the rights to Feedback.

== Appearances ==
Feedback made his debut public appearance at the Mid-Ohio Con the weekend of November 25–26, 2006, in Columbus, Ohio. He has also appeared at, among other events Phoenix Cactus Comicon the weekend of January 26–28, 2007, in Phoenix, AZ; Steel City Con on the weekend of March 24 and 25, 2007, in Monroeville, Pennsylvania, at the Pittsburgh Expomart; and Emerald City Comicon on the weekend of March 31 and April 1 in Seattle, Washington, at the Qwest Expo Hall. He signed autographs and took pictures with fans at each event.

The Feedback comic was released by Dark Horse Comics as a "one-shot" publication under the Who Wants to Be a Superhero? title, officially dated July 4, 2007. The character's story in the comic differs from Feedback's "official" origin (above) in several respects, most notably that "Matt" (the only "civilian" name given for the character in the comic) is struck by lightning while holding a high-tech game controller of his own invention. The character's powers are limited to the equipment mentioned above plus the Feedback Blast; no use of "game energy" is ever mentioned.

The Sci-Fi Original Movie Mega Snake, which debuted August 25, 2007 on the Sci-Fi Channel, featured a brief guest appearance by Feedback. Though the movie was advertised on the Sci-Fi Channel as "starring Feedback," he is a minor character. His time on screen is minimal, totaling less than two minutes. The carnival scene with Feedback was reportedly filmed after the original movie was completed. In the film, the titular monster attacks a carnival grounds while Feedback is present giving a safety lecture to children. Upon the serpentine monster attacking the stage area, Feedback manages to hold the creature off while the crowds evacuate before taking his leave.

He appeared in the opening episode of the second season of Who Wants to Be a Superhero? announcing each contestant's acceptance, and again in the final episode to congratulate the winner of the contest. He also interviewed the contestant who had most recently been removed from the show on Scifi Channel's website after every episode.

Feedback was a Media Guest of Honor at GenCon Indy, Aug 16-19 2007, in Indianapolis, IN. In addition to signing autographs and posing for pictures with fans at his booth on the convention floor (along with Major Victory and Fat Momma), Feedback also sold a limited edition "Feedback Loop" token in association with the True Dungeon event run by True Adventures, Inc. Sales of this token raised over $1700 for the Make-A-Wish Foundation and Recording for the Blind & Dyslexic charities.

Feedback was also a Media Guest of Honor at Gencon Indy, Aug 16-19 2008, along with Hygena and the Enforcer.

Feedback was also a scheduled guest at Dragon*Con, America's largest Sci-fi/Fantasy/Horror/Comic/Media Convention, Labor Day weekend 2007 in Atlanta, GA. Scheduled along with him were fellow contestants Major Victory and Fat Momma.
