= List of Comet stories =

Short stories published weekly between 1946 and 1959

A list of stories published in the J.B. Allen/Amalgamated Press/Fleetway Publications weekly boys' comic Comet between 1946 and 1959.

== Air Taxi ==
Published: 18 June to 30 July 1949
Artist: Reg Beaumont

Air cargo pilot Bill and co-pilot Lynn find their latest assignment - transferring the Red Arrow racing car to France - attracts the attention of thieves.

- Front cover strip.

== The Astounding Adventures of Marco Polo ==
Published: 10 March to 12 May 1951
Artist: Patrick Nicolle

Explorer Marco Polo and warrior maid Shireen encounter pirates and mystics in the Far East.

== The Banner of the Silver Lion ==
Published: 6 November 1954 to 29 January 1955
Artist: Patrick Nicolle

After his father is killed in battle, noble Simon de Montfort must deal with his avaricious brother Amory.

== Billy Bunter ==
Published: 17 December 1947 to 17 February 1951 (text); 9 February 1952 to June 1958 (strip)
Illustrator: C. H. Chapman (text)
Artists: Reg Parlett, George Parlett, Tom Laidler, Reg Bunn, C. H. Chapman (strip)

The antics of the Fat Owl of the Reach and the Famous Five - rugged Form Captain Harry Wharton, sporting star Frank Nugent, excitable Bob Cherry, stoutly proud Yorkshireman Johnny Bull and Indian Prince Hurree Jamset Ram Singh - at Greyfriars School.

- The initial text stories were abridged reprints of Charles Hamilton's stories from The Magnet before a switch to picture strips. Bunter was already running in a cartoon in Knockout when he started appearing in Comet, and the two strips would run parallel until 1958.

== Bob Harley ==
Published: 10 May 1952 to 13 June 1953
Illustrators: Graham Coton, Steven Chapman, Reg Parlett

Police officer Bob Harley of Scotland Yard investigates the theft of an atomic motor by the treacherous scientist Doctor Nikolas.

- Text story.

== Boss of the Lazy O ==
Published: 7 February to 16 May 1947
Writer: Trevor Galway

Englishman Roy Summers takes charge of the Lazy-O ranch, and soon finds himself helping neighbour Jeff Willard fight off cattle rustlers.

- Text story.

== Bowmen of King Harry ==
Published: 29 October 1955 to 28 January 1956

Archers Pip Parkin, Tom Hayfork and Hubert the Minstrel try to play their part in Henry V's French campaign, albeit hindered by their cowardly, rotund superior Sir Rollo Bluster.

== Buck Jones ==
Published: 13 August 1949 to 9 September 1950
Artist: Reg Bunn (Note: Due to most British comics not crediting creators and incomplete records, credits may not be exhaustive)

Lawman Buck Jones keeps the peace in the Wild West.

- Based on a fictionalised version of the film star. Later continued in Sun. Initial episodes were reprinted from Amalgamated Press' Buck Jones series until new Bunn-drawn material started on 8 October 1949. Jones also appeared in Cowboy Picture Library.

== Buffalo Bill ==
Published: 20 May to 16 September 1950; 17 October 1953 to 17 October 1959
Writer: Mike Butterworth
Artists: Fred Meagher, Geoff Campion, Derek Eyles, Steven Chapman, Patrick Nicolle, Fred Holmes, Jesús Blasco, Colin Merritt, Alejandro Blasco, Francisco Hidalgo, Eugenio Giner, Romeu, Julio Vivas, Adriano Blasco, Edward Drury

Buffalo Bill Cody leads the scouts of Custer's 7th Cavalry out of Fort Abraham Lincoln. He soon develops a bond of honour and respect with noble Sioux chief Sitting Bull despite their opposing roles in the Indian Wars.

- The initial 1950 run was reprints of a European strip. From the return on 17 October 1953 until 23 January 1954 the story was a reprint of the United Feature Syndicate newspaper strip, with some additional material by Philip Mendoza. From 30 January 1954 British creators produced original material, in self-contained 8-page stories; this high page count for a weekly story led to the employment of a rotating group of artists. This also saw the character take over on the front cover. Alongside his appearances in Comet, Buffalo Bill also featured in issues of Cowboy Picture Library and Thriller Picture Library. In 1966 the strips were modified and reprinted in Lion as "Texas Jack".

== Cabin in the Woods ==
Published: 4 May to 24 August 1948
Writer: Arthur Catherall
Illustrator: Bob Wilkin

Young Robin Legrice helps his game warden father Dan fend off villainous trappers Skookum Pete and Yorky, with help from his city girl cousin Jeanne.

- Text story.

== Christine and Patch the Circus Starlets ==
Published: 15 November 1946 to 29 June 1958
Artist: H. Cornell

Young girl Christine and her dog Patch try to launch a career at the travelling Grand Circus.

- Cartoon.

== Chuckle Club ==
Published: 14 November 1953 to 17 October 1959
Artist: Rodger

- Cartoon. Readers' jokes drawn by cartoonist Rodger; successful submissions would be rewarded with 10 shillings.

== The Circus of Sandstep ==
Published: 5 September to 2 December 1947
Writer: Arthur Catherall

Adventurous pair Tony Barstow and Penelope Chambers help find missing circus trick pony Wimsy.

- Text story.

== Claude Duval ==
Published: 19 September 1953 to 17 October 1959
Writer: Mike Butterworth
Artists: Fred Holmes, Eric Parker, Patrick Nicolle

The dashing Frenchman Claude Duval daringly leads the Royalist cavalry during the English Civil War. He also protects the Crown from the machinations of the duplicitous French and their Roundhead co-conspirator, Major Midas Mould.

- Renamed "The Gay Cavalier" from 15 September 1956. The comic strip's repurposing of highwayman Duval as a Royalist hero would inspire the Associated-Rediffusion television series The Gay Cavalier, starring Christian Marquand as Duval and Ivan Craig as Mould.

== Commando One ==
Published: 28 June 1958 to 17 October 1959
Artist: Ferdinando Tacconi

Captain Rex Royal of the Commandos is parachuted behind German lines to aid the resistance on Crete in 1942.

- Continued for one episode in Tiger.

== The Cowboy with a Thousand Faces ==
Published: 28 February to 9 May 1953
Illustrator: George Parlett

A sheriff and master of disguise uses his skills to deal with outlaws.

- Text story.

== Dick Barton ==
Published: 11 April to 10 October 1953
Artist: Peter Sutherland, Graham Coton

Detective Dick Barton and partner Snowy White investigate flying saucers.

- Front cover story. Barton appeared some three years after the end of the BBC Radio programme. The third and final serial, "Dick Barton and the Grey Ghost", was a modified version of a Sexton Blake story from Knockout, drawn by Roland Davies. Barton also appeared in Super Detective Library.

== Don Deeds ==
Published: 24 August 1948 to 3 March 1951
Artist: R. W. Plummer

Young bank teller Don Deeds finds himself drawn into an adventure when racketeers target colleague Miss Jones. Later Deeds and female friend Mai-Mai got entangled in a Martian invasion of Earth.

== Dr. Grunter's Zoo School ==
Published: 29 March 1952 to 3 January 1959

A mathematically gifted polar bear teaches other animals.

== Dr. Pennyfeather ==
Published: 8 April 1950 to 3 February, 7 July & 11 August 1951
Artist: Denis Gifford

A bumbling schoolmaster is undone by his pupils.

- Cartoon, paired with "Scamp" on the front cover.

== The Flying Gunmen ==
Published: 20 October to 18 November 1950
Writer: George E. Rochester
Illustrator: Roland Davies

Chick Brown and Polly Western are passengers on an airliner when it is hijacked and taken to a deserted island.

- Text story.

== The Gene Autry Story ==
Published: 24 February to 15 December 1951

- Text story. A biography of actor Gene Autry, illustrated with stills from his films.

== The Golden Scarab ==
Published: 15 June 1948 to 31 May 1949
Artist: Reg Beaumont

British adventurer Mike Thompson is dragged into a Web of intrigue during a visit to Algiers in French North Africa, as - aided by handmaiden Nina - he must recover the Golden Scarab from Sheikh Ali Pasha.

- Text comic, printed on the front cover.

== Guy Gallant ==
Published: 10 February to 23 June 1951
Artist: Edward Drury

Captain Guy Gallant of the Sea Witch hunts for pirate Don Diego - known as the Grandee - in the Sargasso Sea.

- Front cover story.

== Island of Peril ==
Published: 2 May to 15 August 1959

Searching for pearls on a Pacific island, Bob and Pat Shaw clash with the unscrupulous Red Harry.

- Reprint from Super Detective Library.

== Jack the Giant Tamer ==
Published: 16 February to 29 March 1952
Illustrators: Tom Laidler, Reg Parlett

Arriving on a desert island, Jack soon takes control of one the giant natives.

- Text story.

== Jet-Ace Logan ==
Published: 15 September 1956 to 17 October 1959
Writers: Mike Butterworth, David Motton
Artists: Geoff Campion, John Gillatt

A hundred years in the future, RAF pilot Jim "Jet-Ace" Logan and his trusty co-pilot Plumduff Charteris keep Earth safe from alien aggressors.

- Continued in Tiger and Thriller Picture Library.

== Jimmy and Jacko the Merry Monks ==
Published: 15 November 1946 to 29 June 1958
Artist: H. Cornell

Two English-speaking monkeys get into scrapes in the jungle.

== Jimmy's Magic Cat ==
Published: 11 November 1950 to 17 February 1951
Writer: George E. Rochester
Illustrator: Robert MacGillivray

Jimmy and June Watson discover their cat Tutty is actually a transformed Egyptian sorcerer.

== June ==
Published: 13 August to 17 December 1949
Writer & Artist: Norman Pett

Naïve but plucky young girl June is sent back to the time of King Arthur by her uncle's time machine.

- Front cover story. June was designed by Pett as a younger, more wholesome version of his Daily Mirror newspaper strip heroine Jane.

== Jungle Lord ==
Published: 21 February 1947 to 1 June 1948
Artist: Reg Beaumont

Searching for his lost parents in the jungle, Dick Seymour soon comes into conflict with the Ivory trader Snape. Seymour is aided by multiracial local girl Bibi.

- Front cover story.

== The King's Captain ==
Published: 3 November 1951 to 19 January 1952
Writer: Leonard Matthews
Artist: Sep E. Scott

Prince Rupert of the Rhine and his female comrade Black Velvet attempt to protect King Charles II from revolutionary factions.

- Later reprinted in Thriller Picture Library as "The Cavalier and the Crown".

== Kit Carson ==
Published: 16 September 1950 to 1 August 1953 (strip); 8 August to 10 October 1953 (text)
Writer: Joan Whitford (under the pseudonym Barry Ford) (text)
Artists: Geoff Campion, Patrick Nicolle, Ron Embleton, Stephen Chapman, Robert Forrest, R. W. Plummer, Ron Smith, Peter Sutherland, Derek Eyles, Bill Lacey
Illustrator: Derek Eyles (text)

Buckskin-clad Pioneer Railway Company trouble-shooter and scout Kit Carson fends off bandits and natives with his twin six-shooters.

- Carson's adventures were also featured in Knockout and Cowboy Picture Library.

== Laredo - Texas Ranger ==
Published: 28 June to 20 December 1958
Artist: Bob Schoenke

The exploits of Texas Ranger Laredo.

- Reprints of the Register and Tribune Syndicate comic strip "Laredo Crockett".

== The Last of the Commanches ==
Published: 22 December 1951 to 8 March 1952
Writer: Joan Whitford (under the pseudonym Barry Ford)

Red Hand deals with unscrupulous cowboys.

- Text story.

== The Lone Ranger ==
Published: 2 March 1957 to 18 January 1958
Writer: Fran Striker
Artist: Charles Flanders

The masked hero known as the Lone Ranger challenges the guilty and finds justice for the innocent with the help of partner Tonto.

- Reprinted from the King Features Syndicate newspaper strip.

== Mick the Moon Boy ==
Published: 29 March 1952 to 23 May 1959
Illustrator: C.M. Montford, Reg Parlett, George Parlett

A technologically advanced boy from the Moon arrives in the Old West and helps lawmen.

- Text story.

== Mickey's Pal the Wizard ==
Published: 30 May to 1 August 1953
Artist: Reg Parlett

Mickey Royston and his sister Betty gain revenge on their cruel uncle Silas Marley when the boy discovers a brass bottle containing the wizard Akbar Al Bagrag.

- Previously published in Knockout.

== More Tales of the West ==
Published: 2 June to 7 July, 29 September to 29 December 1951
Writer: Joan Whitford (under the pseudonym Barry Ford)
Illustrator: Derek Eyles, Steven Chapman

- Text story. Renamed "Barry Ford's Tales of the West" from 29 September 1951.

== The Mystery of the Moor ==
Published: 30 May to 22 August 1947
Writer: Trevor Holloway
Artist: Bob Wilkin

Camping in Devon, Dick and Jill Martin stumble on criminal activity at a nearby abandoned mine.

- Text story.

== The Mysterious Mr. Midson ==
Published: 29 November 1946 to 24 January 1947
Writer: Ronald Meade

Camling College student Derek Elliot finds out his grouchy master Mr. Milson is involved in a conspiracy.

- Text story.

== Nelson ==
Published: 4 June to 22 October 1955
Artist: Eric Parker

Horatio Nelson commands the Royal Navy to some of its finest victories.

== Odd Job Jack ==
Published: 28 June 1958 to 11 April 1959

- Cartoon. Later reprinted as "Odd Job Bob" in Valiant.

== The Old Timer ==
Artist: Alan Frazer

An elderly employee's poor timekeeping causes stress for his co-workers.

- Cartoon, front cover strip.

== Paul Clifford ==
Published: 7 February to 25 April 1959
Artist: Robert Forrest

Highwayman Paul Clifford falls in love with lawyer's niece Lucy Brandon and vows to go straight,

- Reprint from Thriller Picture Library.

== Phantom of Gravestones Grange ==
Published: 4 February to 28 April 1956
Artist: Eric Parker

Captain Dick Dashwood and his batman Tom Twitcher lead a detachment of Royal Dragoons, sent to capture archvillain Creepy Crawley from his trap-filled lair at Gravestones Grange.

- Creepy Crawley had featured as a villain in "Dick Turpin" in sister comic Sun.

== Phil and Fritzi ==
Published: 28 June 1958 to 3 January 1959
Artist: Ernie Bushmiller

Phil and his girlfriend Fritzi cross wits.

- Reprints of the United Feature Syndicate newspaper strip "Fritzi Ritz".

== Pirate Gold ==
Published: 15 September 1956 to 23 February 1957
Illustrator: Paul Hardy

- Text story. Modified from a S. Walkey serial published in the story paper Chums.

== Poochie ==
Published: 9 December 1950 to 3 February 1951
Artist: Hugh McNeill

Outrageous talking dog Poochie gets totally in the face of miserly owner Mister Fogey.

== The Purple Sunflower ==
Published: 16 December 1947 to 30 April 1948
Writer: Laurence Gill

Kidnappers target teenager Ron Yorke after he finds a mysterious purple flower in the street.

- Text story.

== The Quest of the Jungle Queen ==
Published: 5 to 19 April 1952
Illustrator: Graham Coton

Jack Swift enters the jungle searching for a missing girl called Peta, finding out that she has been made Queen of a lost African tribe. Swift has to get her to safety before she is killed by treacherous high priest Tharka.

- Text story.

== Riff and Raff the Lads of Our Village ==
Published: 15 November 1946 to 29 June 1948
Artist: H. Cornell

Two cheerful boys help out the locals.

- Cartoon.

== Robin Hood ==
Published: 19 November to 17 December 1949; 14 April to 15 September 1951
Artist: Reg Bunn

Sherwood Forest outlaw Robin Hood plunders the prosperous and donates to the downtrodden.

- The Robin Hood mythos also inspired strips in Sun and Knockout.

== Round the World in the Flying Fish ==
Published: 20 September 1946 to 24 September 1949
Artist: David Williams

Siblings Jack and Jill join their Uncle Bob for a voyage in his new invention the Flying Fish, a technological wonder capable of travelling over land, under sea and through the air.

== Rusty Riley ==
Published: 2 September 1950 to 3 March 1951
Artist: Frank Godwin

After being orphaned in The Blitz, Rusty Riley is adopted by kindly American Quentin Miles and taken to his horse ranch in Kentucky, where he makes fast friends with half-sister Patty and dog Flip.

- Reprints of the King Features Syndicate newspaper strip.

== Sally Bright ==
Published: 20 September 1946 to 16 July 1949
Illustrators: Bob Wilkin, David Williams

Resourceful teenage girl Sally Bright helps those in need.

- Text story.

== Scamp ==
Published: 28 January 1950 to 13 January 1951; 10 February 1951 to 6 March 1954
Artist: Fred Robinson

Enthusiastic dog Scamp and partner-in-crime Kitty the cat cause mild disruption to their long-suffering owners.

- Cartoon. Front cover strip.

== School at Castle Grim ==
Published: 28 December 1948 to 16 July 1949
Writer: Jeffrey Trent
Illustrator: David Williams

A fire forces a public school to temporarily relocate to the foreboding Castle Grim.

== Scoop ==
Published: 24 September 1949 to 22 April 1950
Artist: Fred Robinson

Comet's own reporter Scoop goes to great lengths to get the story - usually in vain.

== The Secret of Paul Barron ==
Published: 22 August to 17 October 1959
Artist: Reg Bunn

Agent Miles Mallory sets out to recover gold stolen by Paul Barron.

- Reprinted from Super Detective Library.

== The Secret of the Sea Spider ==
Published: 20 June to 12 September 1953
Illustrator: Philip Mendoza

Digby Everard builds a huge mechanical vessel called the Sea Spider and seems to have turned to piracy; however, when his friend Guy Raynor investigates he finds Everard is instead aiming for illegal arms factories.

- Text story.

== Shorty the Deputy Sheriff ==
Published: 3 December 1949 to 13 June 1953
Artists: Hugh McNeill, Eric Bradbury, Reg Parlett

A well-meaning, diminutive lawman causes disruption.

- Cartoon.

== Sir Tich ==
Published: 8 October 1949 to 25 March 1950
Artists: Geoff Campion, Norman Ward

Despite his slight stature, gallant knight Sir Tich triumphs through a mixture of courage and pure luck.

- Cartoon.

== The Sky Explorers ==
Published: 26 January 1952 to 4 April 1953
Artist: Geoff Campion, Pete Sutherland, W. Bryce-Hamilton, Reg Parlett

Young siblings Peter and Ann are whisked away by their Uncle Jolly to visit strange civilisations in his rocket ship - including an island of superannuated pirates, another populated by clockwork robots (built by Swiss inventors Von Tik and Von Tok), and the planet Jupiter.

- Originally a text comic before being transformed into the front cover strip, drawn by Parlett, from 28 June 1952.

== Splash Page ==
Published: 6 May to 16 September 1950 (strip), 7 October to 4 November 1950 (text)

Artist/Illustrator: Alex Oxley Top Daily World reporter Splash Page's investigative work puts him and his assistant Jill Brent in the centre of the story.

- Page debuted as an ally of Sexton Blake decades before in the story paper Union Jack.

== Strongbow the Mohawk ==
Published: 8 August 1953 to 1 June 1957
Artists: Geoff Campion, Stephen Chapman, Graham Coton, Robert Forrest, Philip Mendoza, Colin Merritt, Patrick Nicolle

After the Mohawk tribe that raised him are slaughtered, white man Strongbow becomes a doctor in the town of TOWN while hunting for the killers. He later faces the likes of Choctaw rebel Black Lynx and evil Huron chief Rattlesnake, gains a doughty ally in Hawkeye the Hunter and meets the likes of General Custer and Davy Crockett.

- The story launched on the front cover before moving to the interior.

== Tarzan of the Apes ==
Published: 24 February 1951 to 9 February 1952
Writer: Edgar Rice Burroughs
Illustrators: Edward Drury, Eric Parker, Ron Smith, Graham Coton

- Text story. Reprints of Edgar Rice Burroughs stories from All-Story Magazine and New Story Magazine with new illustrations.

== They Lived By the Gun ==
Published: 5 to 26 May 1951
Writer: Joan Whitford (under the pseudonym Barry Ford)

- Text story.

== Thunderbolt Jaxon ==
Published: 13 August to 5 November 1949
Artist: Hugh McNeill

- Reprints from Thunderbolt Jaxon. The character would later reappear in Knockout in 1958.

== The Tobacco Runners ==
Published: 7 September to 14 December 1948
Writer: David Morris

Peter and June Kelsey stumble across a tobacco smuggling racket.

- Text story.

== Tommy Hawk and Mo Cassin ==
Published: 14 January to 26 August 1950
Artist: Birch, Denis Gifford

- Reprinted from Knockout, and later reprinted in Valiant.

== Under the Golden Dragon ==
Published: 3 January to 29 May 1954
Writer: Mike Butterworth
Artist: Patrick Nicolle

William the Conqueror's Norman army lands in 1066 to face the forces of King Harold.

- Later reprinted in Thriller Picture Library.

== Vikings of the Spaceways ==
Published: 27 January to 28 April 1951
Writer: Paul Flood
Illustrators: Reg Bunn, Patrick Nicolle

Reporter Tom Pennant investigates a spate of spaceship disappearances, leading him and friend Prince Rudolph of Transitania to Deimos.

- Text story.

== War Eagle ==
Published: 1 February to 21 June 1958
Artist: Ferdinando Tacconi

Raised by sea-eagles on an isolated rock in the North Atlantic, Eagle joins the RAF during World War II. His avian upbringing naturally allows him to swiftly become a fighter ace, and he is soon entrusted with the experimental Whiplash as his personal aircraft.

== The Wheezes of Willie Wizzard ==
Published: 15 October 1952 to 1 August 1953
Illustrator: Hugh McNeill, Reg Parlett

Inventor Willie Wizzard's innovations rarely work as intended.

- Text story.

== The White Fox ==
Published: 29 July to 19 August 1950
Writer: Jack Lewis (under the pseudonym Lewis Jackson)
Illustrator: Tom Laidler

Visiting his mean uncle Squire Dean, Jack Dean crosses paths with

- Text story.

== Adaptations ==
=== The Adventures of Gallant Bess ===
Published: 3 June to 22 July 1950

- Based on the British Lion film.

=== Buffalo Stampede ===
Published: 5 May to 4 August 1951
Artist: Ron Smith

- Based on the novel by Zane Grey.

=== The Coral Island ===
Published: 22 October 1949 to 25 March 1950
Illustrator: Michael Hubbard

- Based on the novel by R.M. Ballantyne. Illustrations taken from the Knockout picture strip adaptation.

=== Distant Drums ===
Published: 19 April 1952 to 3 May 1953

- Text story. Based on the Warner Bros. film; illustrated with stills.

=== The Elusive Pimpernel ===
Published: 31 December 1949 to 6 May 1950
Artist: W. Bryce-Hamilton

- Based on the British Lion film.

=== The Exploits of Hereward the Wake ===
Published: 26 August to 14 October 1950
Illustrator: Tom Laidler

- Text story. Based on the novel by Charles Kingsley.

=== Julius Caesar ===
Published: 21 November to 26 December 1953
Artist: Patrick Nicolle

- Based on the MGM film.

=== King of the Khyber Rifles ===
Published: 5 June to 24 July 1954
Artist: Philip Mendoza

- Based on the Twentieth Century-Fox film.

=== Knights of the Round Table ===
Published: 31 July to 6 November 1954
Artist: Patrick Nicolle

- Based on the MGM film.

=== The Last Outpost ===
Published: 18 August to 27 October 1951
Artist: Ron Smith

- Based on the Paramount film.

=== The Lion and the Horse ===
Published: 6 to 27 December 1952

- Text story. Based on the Warner Bros. film, illustrated with stills.

=== The Sheriff of Fractured Jaw ===
- Text story. Based on the 20th Century Fox film, illustrated with stills.

=== The Spanish Main ===
Published: 8 August to 7 November 1953
Artist: Patrick Nicolle

- Based on the RKO film.

=== Treasure Island ===
Published: 30 September 1946 to 16 December 1947
Artist: Bob Wilkin

- Based on the novel by Robert Louis Stevenson.
