= List of Sun stories =

A list of stories published in the J.B. Allen/Amalgamated Press/Fleetway Publications weekly boys' comic Sun between 1947 and 1959.

== 1066 ==
Published: 3 November to 22 December 1951
Artist: Roy Davis

Both the Normans and the Saxons muddle their way towards the Battle of Hastings.

- Cartoon.

== 55BC ==
Published: 10 June to 16 September 1950
Artist: Roy Davis

Julius Caesar leads his legions to invade Britain, only to find the Ancient Britons to be a strange bunch, and his own troops no better.

- Cartoon.

== Addy ==
Published: 2 March 1948 to 25 June 1949
Artist: Edward Banger

The misadventures of a bumbling navy admiral.

- Cartoon.

== The Adventures of Boy Colin ==
Published: 9 October 1954 to 29 October 1955
Writer: Jacques Van Melkebeke
Artist: Paul Cuvelier

Colin and his friends Prince Wong and Singh hunt for treasure in the Temple of Jade.

- Reprints of "L'Extraordinaire Odyssée de Corentin Feldoé" from Tintin.

== The Adventures of Marco Polo ==
Published: 21 August to 2 October 1954
Artist: Michael Hubbard

Marco Polo and father Nicolo Polo are entertained at the court of Kublai Khan.

- Reprints from Knockout.

== Alfred the Great ==
Published: 4 November 1950 to 17 February 1951
Artist: Roy Davis

King Alfred finds novel ways of repulsing an invasion by bumbling Vikings.

- Cartoon.

== All at Sea ==
Published: 24 January to 17 October 1959
Artists: Geoff Campion, Fred Holmes

The adventures of sailors Stripey, Nobby and Jock.

== Alley Cat Ollie ==
Published: 28 July 1951 to 10 January 1953
Artist: Harry Hargreaves

A cat's attempts to catch fish and birds causes disaster on the streets.

- Cartoon.

== Battler Britton ==
Published: 7 January 1956 to 17 October 1959
Artists: Geoff Campion, Eric Bradbury, Ian Kennedy, Reg Bunn, Carlos Freixas

The adventures of a World War II British fighter ace.

- Later promoted to the front cover from 28 June 1958. Also in Battle Picture Library, Knockout, The Champion, Tiger and Valiant.

== Billy the Kid ==
Published: 16 August 1952 to 17 October 1959
Writer: Mike Butterworth
Artists: Geoff Campion, Stephen Chapman, Eric Parker, Selby Donnison, Colin Merritt, C. L. Doughty, Fred Holmes, Ian Kennedy, Jesús Blasco, Eric Bradbury, Reg Bunn, Don Lawrence, R. Charles Roylance, Keith Shone (Note: Due to most British comics not crediting creators and incomplete records, credits may not be exhaustive)

William Boney retires to a peaceful life on a ranch but when trouble brews dons the mask and black outfit of Billy the Kid once more, riding his horse Satan to drive off villains.

- Continued in Lion. Also featured in Knockout and Cowboy Picture Library, later reprinted as "The Black Avenger" in Campion modelled the character on actor Robert Taylor, who had portrayed Billy the Kid in the 1941 film version.

== Buck Jones ==
Published: 7 July to 22 December 1951
Artist: Geoff Campion

Sheriff Buck Jones deals with outlaws and kidnappers.

- Based on the Western actor Buck Jones, previously in The Comet and also in Cowboy Picture Library.

== The Canyon Kids ==
Published: 29 December 1951 to 22 March 1952
Artist: Eric Bradbury

Hayseed children Elmer, Emmie, Homer, Nibbler, Hot Shot, Lollipop Lou, Tubby, Cedric and Gumboil build bizarre devices.

- Cartoon.

== The Centurion's Secret ==
Published: 2 March to 8 June 1948
Writer: David Morris
Illustrator: Bob Wilkin

John Trevor, his children Eric and Kaye and the archaeologist Professor Warwickson set off to a Roman wall in Northumberland to search for a cache of documents reputedly buried there by Centurion Paulus. However, they find landowner Mr. Russell to be strangely uncooperative.

- Text story.

== The Chums of St. Clemens ==
Published: 7 January to 9 September & 7 to 28 October 1950
Writer: Percy Clarke (under the pseudonym Martin Fraser)

The adventurers of pupils at an English boarding school.

- Text story. A spinoff of Knockout story "Tales of St. Clemens".

== The Cisco Kid ==
Published: 5 April to 27 June 1958
Writer: Ron Reed
Artist: Jose Luis Salinas

Caballero Cisco Kid hunts outlaws, aided by Mexican sidekick Pancho.

- Reprints of King Features newspaper strip.

== Clip McCord ==
Published: 27 May 1950 to 5 May 1951
Artist: Reg Bunn

Ace Daily Bugle reporter Clip McCord is recruited by the secret service to stop the machinations of criminal mastermind the Hawk, aided by assistant Mary Trent.

== The Cruise of the Cormorant ==
Published: 11 November 1947 to 17 February 1948
Writer: Arthur Catherall

Holidaying off the coast of Spain in their uncle Toby's yacht Cormorant, Dick and Pam are drawn into a thrilling hunt for treasure.

- Text story.

== Deadshot Sue ==
Published: 1 October 1949 to 7 January 1950
Artist: Hugh McNeill

Ace sharpshooter Sue Sage lives with her grandfather, little brother Timmy and little sister Lottie on Sundown Ranch. However, gambler and Sourdough City mayor Lou Largo plans to take over their spread.

== Dick Turpin ==
Published: 17 February 1951 to 17 October 1959 (strip), 15 September 1956 to 4 May 1957 (text)
Writer: Mike Butterworth
Artists: Hugh McNeill, Eric Parker, John McNamara, Edgar Spencely, Derek Eyles, Geoff Campion, Jesus Blasco, Eric Bradbury
Illustrator: C. L. Doughty

Unjustly outlawed, Dick Turpin and his female companion Moll Moonlight roam the roads of Britain, foiling villains such as Creepy Crawley. Later, Turpin allied with friend Jem Peters and servant Beetles.

- Later reprinted in Thriller Picture Library. The text stories ran parallel to the picture strips. The latter were later reprinted as "Jack o' Justice" in Valiant; Moll retained her name in the reprints and continued as a supporting character when new material was printed.

== Ethelred the Unready ==
Published: 26 May to 21 June 1951
Artist: Roy Davis

The unfortunate King Ethelred lives up to his historical epithet.

- Cartoon. Later reprinted in Tiger.

== The Farm of Secrets ==
Published: 29 March to 6 August 1949
Writer: David Morris
Illustrators: Bob Wilkin, David Williams

Exploring their home of Dingle Farm, twins Roy and Julia Cranston discover a secret message, which shepherd Tom Marsden believes might lead to the fortune of his late uncle Simon. However they must unravel the mystery before cowhand Jake Taylor and sinister Mr. Manson are able to do so.

- Text story.

== Find It Who Can ==
Published: 26 November 1949 to 1 April 1950
Writer: John Hunter
Illustrator: Derek Eyles

Schoolboys Tom Standring and Billy Baldwin find a fragment of a map to the buried treasure of notorious pirate Paul Caron. However, their search sees the pair fall into the hands of a gang of smugglers.

- Text story.

== Formula X ==
Published: 2 March to 21 December 1948
Artist: Serge Drigin

Detective Steve Murton tries to stop vital scientific papers from falling into the hands of sinister foreign agents, aided by his driver Ginger.

== Fuzzy ==
Published: 11 November 1947 to 2 March 1948
Writer: Bob Wilkin (under the pseudonym Wendy Wilkin)
Artist: Bob Wilkin

A smartly-dressed, cunning rabbit protects his friends from foxes.

- Cartoon.

== The Golden Whistle ==
Published: 6 December 1951 to 24 May 1952
Illustrators: Philip Mendoza, Patrick Nicolle, Ron Smith, Robert MacGillivray, Reg Parlett

Schoolboy Tommy Brown has a magic whistle capable of bringing objects to life.

- Text story. Renamed "Tommy's Magic Whistle" from 22 March 1952.

== Hal Hotspur ==
Published: 24 February to 25 August 1951

Gallant knight Hal Hotspur and his squire Alain battle the villainous Fitz-Stephen.

== The Happy Hussar ==
Published: 20 February 1954 to 2 February 1957
Writer: Mike Butterworth
Artists: Eric Parker, Julio Vivas, Philip Mendoza, Fred Holmes, Eric Bradbury

Max Bravo is a gallant, skilled rider in the French Army's 9th Hussars as Napoleon's forces battle through Central Europe. Bravo must also be wary of vicious rival Sergeant-Major Slashtrap.

- Later reprinted in Thriller Picture Library and Swift.

== Handy Andy ==
Published: 28 April 1951 to 18 October 1952, 28 June 1958 to 30 May 1959
Artist: Hugh McNeill, Denis Gifford, Eric Bradbury, Reg Parlett

Andy's attempts to show off his intelligence are constantly undermined by his dim-witted behaviour.

- Cartoon. Previously in Knockout and also appeared in The Comet.

== Harold the Hare ==
Published: 8 July 1950 to 22 May 1952
Artist: Roy Davis, Harry Hargreaves

A hare called Harold has adventures in a world of anthropomorphic animals called Leafy Wood.

- Cartoon. The character later returned in preschool title Jack and Jill, then headlined spinoff title Harold Hare's Own Magazine between 1959 and 1964, and was later purchased from Fleetway by Look and Learn Ltd.

== Home in Happy Valley ==
Published: 17 February 1948 to 25 June 1949
Illustrator: Bob Wilkin

The Morton family move to a farmstead in seemingly idyllic Happy Valley, but soon find not all the locals are welcoming.

- Text story.

== Jak of the Jaguars ==
Published: 29 March to 9 November 1952
Artists: Patrick Nicolle, Philip Mendoza, Stephen Chapman

Washed ashore as a baby following a shipwreck, a baby is saved by a jaguar and raised by a jungle tribe, becoming a skilled warrior called Jak.

== Jeremy Blaze, the Boy Buccaneer ==
Published: 29 August 1953 to 14 August 1954
Writer: Mike Butterworth

Jeremy Blaze is the young captain of Royal Navy warship HMS Lightning, and soon starts making a name for himself as a daring and talented commander.

== The Jester's Revenge ==
Published: 4 November 1950 to 10 February 1951

Noble Count Roger of Lombardy is betrayed by his jester Odo, who imprisons heir Guy and allows the French to take control of their castle. Roger's loyal retainer Marius is able to escape the purge and swears to avenge his master.

== John and Joan Randall ==
Published: 3 February 1948 to 24 December 1949
Artist: R. W. Plummer

Professor Randall takes his children John and Joan, as well as their dog Rover, on adventures in a spaceship to Venus and beyond.

== The Jolly Giants of Jupiter ==
Published: 20 August to 26 November 1949
Illustrator: Bob Wilkin

Travelling by rocket with Professor Pooter, Peter Hayward and his cousin Molly land on Jupiter, finding the planet populated by amiable giants.

- Text story.

== Jolly Wally ==
Published: 28 July to 22 September 1951
Artist: Eric Bradbury

Enthusiastic circus boy Jolly Wally and his (more intelligent) horse Trix get in a variety of scrapes.

- Cartoon.

== Kindheart ==
Published: 11 November 1947 to 25 June 1949
Artist: Walter Holt

A dog with a heart on his fur does good deeds and makes sure mean types get their comeuppance.

- Cartoon.

== King of the Wild Horses ==
Published: 26 May to 27 October 1951
Artist: H. C. Milburn

The piebald leader of a pack of wild horses wandering the plains protects his followers from the likes of Sharp Fang the wolf, Slithe the rattlesnake and Cougar the mountain lion.

== The King's Musketeers ==
Published: 15 November 1952 to 3 January 1953
Artist: H. M. Brock

The Black Musketeers - including d'Artagnan, Athos, Porthos and Aramis - defend the throne of Louis XIII.

- Later reprinted in Thriller Picture Library.

== Lord of Sherwood ==
Published: 29 March to 21 June 1952 (text), 22 November 1952 to 20 April 1958 (strip)
Writers: Lance Sterling (text) Mike Butterworth (strip), Joan Whitford (strip, under the pseudonym Barry Ford)
Illustrators: Stephen Chapman, Patrick Nicolle
Artists: Patrick Nicolle, Fred Holmes, Geoff Campion, C. L. Doughty, Edgar Spencely, Reginald Heade, Jesús Blasco

Chased from his castle by Normans after his father is killed in the Crusades, Robin of Locksley and faithful servant Watt set up a base of operations in Sherwood Forest as they plan to fight back against their oppressors.

== Marooned on Mars ==
Published: 9 July to 19 September 1949
Writer and Artist: Norman Williams

Martians planning an invasion of Earth kidnap boxer Tom Boyd to find out more about humans; he is freed by Martian Princess Gayra, and they set about thwarting the attack.

== Mr. Peep ==
Published: 21 April 1951 to 1 March 1952
Artist: Fred Robinson

The nosey Mr. Peep finds out about various things in a clumsy, disruptive fashion.

- Cartoon.

== Moko the Monk ==
Published: 4 February 1950 to 18 October 1952
Artist: Robert MacGillivray, Harry Hargreaves

A curious chimp tries out various pieces of human technology, with chaotic results.

- Cartoon. Later graduated to the front cover.

== My Pal Wagger ==
Published: 29 March to 20 September 1952
Writer: David Roberts
Illustrator: Stephen Chapman

A gypsy boy called Ned and his dog Wagger solve crimes.

- Text story.

== The Mystery of Westford Manor ==
Published: 22 June to 26 October 1948
Writer: Arthur Catherall (under the pseudonym Trevor Holloway)
Illustrator: Bob Wilkin

Brian King and Hilary Dene search for the lost treasure of buccaneer Henry DeLancey at the pirate's old home at Westford Manor.

- Text story.

== The New Adventures of Monte Cristo ==
Published: 21 April to 1 September 1951
Writer: Frank S. Pepper (under the pseudonym John Morion)
Illustrator: Eric Parker

The richest man in the world, the Count of Monte Cristo is also a tenacious adventurer who investigates international mysteries.

- Text story.

== The Petrified Valley ==
Published: 17 August 1948 to 29 October 1949

WA:Artist: Bill Holroyd Professor Wimple and his young assistant Don investigate the mysterious Petrified Valley, a land ruled by an evil wizard.

== Professor Peanut ==
Published: 26 November 1949 to 15 April 1950
Artist: Hugh McNeill

The misadventures of a forgetful scientist.

- Cartoon. Also featured in Knockout.

== The Queer Adventures of Patsy and Tim ==
Published: 9 July to 26 November 1949
Artist: Eric Parker

Professor Digby invents the Dwindling Pill, capable of shrinking human beings. His nephew Tim and niece Patsy take them and are miniaturised for numerous adventures.

- Reprints from Knockout.

== Roy Rogers - King of the Cowboys ==
Published: 9 February to 10 August 1957

- Reprints of King Features newspaper strip.

== Sexton Blake ==
Published: 8 September to 1 December 1951
Writer: Francis Warwick (under the pseudonym Warwick Jardine)

- Text story. Sexton Blake appeared simultaneously in a picture strip in Knockout.

== Sherwood Outlaw ==
Published: 11 November 1947 to 17 September 1949
Artist: Reg Beaumont

Robin Hood strives to free Maid Marian from Baron Irvine.

== Sinbad Sails Again ==
Published: 29 March to 26 July 1952
Artists: Stephen Chapman, Michael Hubbard

Sinbad undertakes a perilous sea journey to visit the Caliph of Baghdad.

- From 7 June 1952 the feature reprinted "Sinbad the Sailor" from Knockout.

== Sitting Bull ==
Published: 1 October 1949 to 9 August 1952
Writer: Marijac
Artists: Dut, R. J. Plummer, Patrick Nicolle, Steve Chapman

On the run after shooting the man who killed his father, Michael Kearney is taken under the wing of Sitting Bull, noble chief of the Lakota tribe.

- Reprints of "Sitting Bull" by Marijac and Dut from Coq Hardi from 1 October 1949 to 19 May 1951 and 29 September 1951 to 15 March 1952. Other strips were in-house material. Sitting Bull also featured in a parallel story in Knockout, "Sitting Bull's Schooldays".

== Susan Starr, the Girl Reporter ==
Published: 11 November 1947 to 3 September 1949
Writer: Arthur Catherall (under the pseudonym Peter Hallard)

A writer for The Marport Evening News, Susan Starr's assignments often aren't as straightforward as they seem.

- Text story.

== The Terrible Three ==
Published: 15 September 1956 to 21 June 1958
Writer: Charles Hamilton (under the pseudonym Martin Clifford)
Artists: Reg Bunn, Eric Parker

The antics of St. Jim's pupils Tom Merry, Monty Lowther and Harry Manners.

- The characters had been created for storypaper The Gem in 1907.

== Tom Merry's Schooldays ==
Published: 25 October 1952 to 13 June 1953
Writer: Charles Hamilton (under the pseudonym Martin Clifford)
Illustrator: Robert McDonald

Public schoolboy Tom Merry gets into scrapes.

- Text story. Tom Merry had previously appeared in story paper The Gem between 1907 and 1939, and also featured in "The Terrible Three".

== Tough Tempest - Crime Buster ==
Published: 2 December 1950 to 14 April 1951
Writer: Jacques Pendowner
Illustrator: Eric Parker

'Tough' Rod Tempest battles a European crime ring with designs on the jewels known as the Seven Stars of Wisdom.

== Warrior the Wonder Dog ==
Published: 22 December 1951 to 15 May 1952
Illustrator: Stephen Chapman

Loyal hound Warrior helps a trapper called Jim in the wild North of America.

== Where Adventurers Meet ==
Published: 9 December 1947 to 3 February 1948
Writer: A. R. Channel
Illustrator: Bob Wilkin

Explorer Eric Thompson meets the Queen of the Crags.

- Text story.

== Wild Bill Hickok ==
Published: 2 December 1950 to 22 December 1951 (text), 22 March 1952 to 26 March 1955 (text), 2 April to 31 December 1955 (strip)
Writer: Joan Whitford (under the pseudonym Barry Ford)
Illustrators: Derek Eyles, Geoff Campion, Stephen Chapman, Reg Bunn
Artists: Geoff Campion, Eric Bradbury (strip)

The escapades of frontier lawman Bill Hickok.

== Young Joey ==
Published: 26 November 1949 to 19 May 1951
Artist: Hugh McNeill, Ron Smith, Geoff Campion n

Joey is taken on adventures by the genie Pip-Van-Winkle.

- Cartoon.

== Adaptations ==
=== The Black Rose ===
Published: 26 August 1950 to 6 January 1951
Artist: Hugh McNeill

- Based on the 20th Century Fox film.

=== Branded ===
Published: 10 March to 30 June 1951
Writer: Joan Whitford (under the pseudonym Barry Ford)
Artist: Geoff Campion

- Based on the Paramount film.

=== The Fighting O'Flynn ===
Published: 21 January to 1 July 1950
Artist: Hugh McNeill

- Based on the Universal film.

=== Gene Autry in Loaded Pistols ===
Published: 13 to 20 May 1950

- Text story illustrated with stills, based on the Columbia film.

=== Good King Wenceslas ===
Published: 23 December 1947
Artist: Bob Wilkin

- Based on the Christmas carol.

=== Hills of the Brave ===
Published: 22 July to 12 August 1950

- Text story illustrated with stills, based on the Columbia film.

=== The Inspector General ===
Published: 8 July to 19 August 1950
Artist: Hugh McNeill

- Based on the Warner Bros. film.

=== Ivanhoe ===
Published: 28 June to 15 November 1952
Artist: Patrick Nicolle

- Based on the MGM film.

=== King Solomon's Mines ===
Published: 13 January to 5 May 1951
Artist: Hugh McNeill

- Based on the MGM film.

=== The King's Thief ===
Published: 15 October to 31 December 1955
Artist: Eric Bradbury

- Based on the MGM film.

=== MacDonald of the Canadian Mounties ===
Published: 20 June to 22 August 1953
Artist: Patrick Nicolle

- Based on the 20th Century Fox film. Later modified and reprinted as "Dick Daring of the Mounties" in Thriller Picture Library.

=== The Martian ===
Published: 25 October 1958 to 23 May 1959
Artist: Robert Forrest

- Based on the novel A Princess of Mars by Edgar Rice Burroughs.

=== Mighty Joe Young ===
Published: 10 December 1949 to 18 February 1950
Artist: Robert MacGillivray

- Based on the RKO film.

=== No Dust on My Saddle ===
Published: 28 February to 25 April 1959
Artist: Edward Drury

- Reprints from Thriller Picture Library. Based on the novel by Charles M. Lee.

=== The Prisoner of Zenda ===
Published: 10 January to 14 March 1953
Artist: Patrick Nicolle

- Based on the MGM film.

=== The Red Rapiers ===
Published: 2 May to 5 September 1959
Artist: Robert Forrest

- Reprints from Thriller Picture Library. Based on the novel by David Leslie Murray.

=== Rogues of Sherwood Forest ===
Published: 16 September to 25 November 1950

- Text story illustrated with stills, based on the Colombia film.

=== Sand ===
Published: 4 March to 13 May 1950
Artist: Derek Eyles, Geoff Campion

- Based on the 20th Century Fox film.

=== She Wore a Yellow Ribbon ===
Published: 20 May to 1 July 1950
Artist: Robert MacGillivray

- Based on the RKO film.

=== Sons of the Musketeers ===
Published: 1 to 22 March 1952

- Text story illustrated with stills, based on the RKO film.

=== South of St. Louis ===
Published: 21 January to 29 April 1950

- Photostrip. Based on the Warner Bros. film.

=== The Spider and the Fly ===
Published: 24 December 1949

- Text story illustrated with stills, based on the GFD film.

=== The Swiss Family Robinson ===
Published: 11 November 1947 to 3 August 1948
Artist: Bob Wilkin

- Based on the novel by Johann David Wyss.

=== A Ticket to Tomahawk ===
Published: 12 August to 28 October 1950
Artist: Rodger

- Based on the 20th Century Fox film.

=== When Worlds Collide ===
Published: 6 to 27 October 1951

- Text story illustrated with stills, based on the Paramount film.

=== Winchester '73 ===
Published: 19 August to 23 September 1950

- Text story illustrated with stills, based on the Universal film.

=== The Wind in the Willows ===
Published: 18 February to 28 November 1950
Artist: Hugh McNeill

- Reprints from Woman's Pictorial, based on the novel by Kenneth Grahame.
