= List of Knockout (British comics) stories =

A list of stories published in the Amalgamated Press/Fleetway Publications weekly boys' comic Knockout between 1939 and 1963.

== The Adventures of Bear Cub ==
Published: 17 February 1940 to 25 January 1941 (text); 28 February to 30 May 1942 (strip)
Illustrator: Derek Eyles (text)
Artist: Eric Parker (strip)

Young Sioux warrior Bear Cub makes friends with paleface Bill Chapman.

== The Adventures of Marco Polo ==
Published: 27 November 1948 to 8 January 1949
Artist: Michael Hubbard

Marco Polo and father Nicolo Polo are entertained at the court of Kublai Khan.

== The Bandit of Baghdad ==
Published: 1 October to 3 December 1949
Artist: Lunt Roberts

Scheming Vizier Abu Hassan tries to usurp the post of Caliph of Baghdad at the expense of true heir, the young Prince Ahmed of Basra.

== Battler Britton ==
Published: 21 May 1960 to 16 February 1963
Artists: Geoff Campion, Ian Kennedy, Colin Merritt

The adventures of a World War II British fighter ace.

- Continued from Sun; continued (as reprints) in Valiant.

== Beau Brummell ==
Published: 27 May 1950 to 12 May 1951
Writer: Frank S. Pepper (under the pseudonym John Marian)
Illustrator: Eric Parker

Tales of the Regency dandy.

- Text story.

== Bert and Daisy - The Happy Vaccies ==
Published: 8 March 1941 to 29 September 1945
Illustrators: Derek Eyles, Eric Parker

Two evacuees find adventure in their new home.

- Retitled "The Happy Adventures of Bert and Daisy" from 14 July 1945.

== Billy Bunter ==
Published: 4 March 1939 to 16 February 1963
Artists: Charles H. Chapman, Frank Minnitt, Eric Roberts, Reg Parlett, Arthur Martin, Les Barton, A.J. Pease

The heavyweight chump Billy Bunter causes problems for the other pupils and staff of Greyfriars School with his greed and idiocy.

- Cartoon strip. Continued in Valiant.

== The Black Pirate ==
Published: 26 November 1960 to 4 March 1961
Artist: Cecil Langley Doughty

Richard Fairfax, the son of Captain Jonas Fairfax, hunts down the Spanish galleon Santa Joanna to seek revenge for the unlawful death of his father.

== Blacksmoke ==
Published: 3 October 1959 to 2 January 1960

Boy Tim Flanagan attempts to restore the storied but decommissioned locomotive Blacksmoke.

== Blarney Bluffer ==
Published: 23 July 1960 to 16 February 1963
Artist: Angel Nadal

A small-scale spiv tells tall tales to shift his wares.

- Cartoon strip. Later reprinted as "Gabby McGlew" in Valiant.

== Bobby's Bugle Guards the Khyber Pass ==
Published: 12 August 1939 to 10 February 1940.

Bobby's bugle guards the Khyber Pass.

- Text story.

== Buffalo Bill ==
Published: 17 February 1940 to 3 February 1951 (strip), 27 April 1950 to 15 August 1953 (text)
Writer: Joan Whitford (under the pseudonym John Haslar, text)
Artists: Joseph Walker, Cecil Langley Doughty, Derek Eyles, Eric Parker (strip)
Illustrators: Derek Eyles, Cecil Holloway, Eric Parker, Geoff Campion, Stephen Chapman (text)

Buffalo Bill keeps crooks and hostile natives at bay in the Wild West.

== Breed of the Brudenels ==
Published: 17 December 1949 to 6 May 1950
Writer: Leonard Matthews
Artist: H. M. Brock

The adventures of dandy highwayman Dick Turpin.

== Captain Flame ==
Published: 6 November 1948 to 1 December 1950; 14 March to 6 June 1953
Writer: Leonard Matthews
Artist: Sep E. Scott

After being stranded on a desert island by pirates, Michael Flame and loyal friend Count Anthony Ferrara escape and fund their own galleon flush the miscreants out of the world's sea-lanes.

== Captain Careless ==
Published: 21 October 1961 to 12 May 1962
Artist: Fred Holmes

King's Cavaliers captain Kit Careless and his men Tom Hodges and Ben Carstairs try to recover the Crown Jewels from the mysterious Masked Woman and her underlings.

- Modified reprints of "Claude Duval" from The Comet.

== Captain Kidd's Lost Prize ==
Published: 14 to 28 May 1949
Artist: T. Heath Robinson

The merchantman Sunflower tries to evade dread pirate William Kidd's Venture.

== Captain Phantom ==
Published: 9 August 1952 to 5 December 1953
Writer: Ron Clarke
Artists: Graham Coton, Mike Western

The British agent codenamed Captain Phantom is a master of disguise, a talent he uses to foil Germany's designs on Britain during World War II. His secret identity, not known to even his own superiors, is Squadron Leader Ralph Daunton.

== The Curse of Claw Castle ==
Published: 4 August to 17 November 1962
Artist: Robert Forrest

== Cuthbert the Clumsy ==
Published: 3 February to 17 March 1951
Artist: Tom Laidler

Oafish youth Cuthbert Doolittle tries to earn a place in Robin Hood's band. His bumbling nature seems set to scupper his chances, but his various clangers have a tendency to work out.

== Davy Crockett ==
Published: 22 October 1955 to 19 September 1959
Artists: Ian Kennedy, Mike Western, George Parlett, Ramon de la Fuente

Tennessee tracker and outdoorsman Davy Crockett tames the wild frontier.

- The character had previously featured in Knockout's adaptation of the film Davy Crockett, Indian Scout. He also appeared concurrently in Cowboy Comics Library.

== Deed-a-Day Danny ==
Published: 4 March 1939 to 10 April 1954
Artist: Hugh McNeill, Frank Lazenby, Wally Robertson, Norman Ward, A.J. Kelly, Geoff Campion, Eric Bradbury, Brian White, Ron Smith

Boy scout Danny's desire to help others doesn't always go smoothly.

- Cartoon strip.

== Dick Turpin ==
Published: 13 August 1960 to 27 May 1961
Writer: Colin Brooks
Illustrators: H. M. Brock, Ronald Simmons, Fred Holmes

Highwayman Dick Turpin carries out daring robberies.

- Text story.

== Dick Turpin and the Cavern of Monsters ==
Published: 19 May to 28 July 1962
Artist: Jesús Blasco

- Reprinted from Sun.

== Frank and Fred, the Pocket-size Cowboys ==
Published: 19 June to 23 November 1943
Artist: Eric Parker

Two boys from a secret society of miniature people thwart crimes in the Old West.

== From the Vaults of Time ==
Published: 24 November 1962 to 16 February 1963
Artist: Francisco Solano López

Professor Kraken's experiments allow him to hatch dinosaur eggs, but the creatures soon escape their enclosure and rampage across Britain.

- Continued in Valiant.

== Ginger Tom ==
Published: 18 August 1956 to 13 February 1959
Writer: Ron Clarke
Artist: Pat Nicolle

Redheaded Tom Meadowman is a squire in the service of Sir Guy de Travere. He wants to become a knight himself, but must first deal with Sir Guy's scheming man-at-arms Broadsword.

- From 8 March 1958 the serial was renamed "Firebrand the Red Knight" to reflect Tom gaining his knighthood.

== Gordon Jim ==
Published: 21 April to 11 August 1956

After a vicious border feud, Gordon Jim is the only survivor of the noble Scottish house of Lanark after their clashes with the Northern English Sutherland family. Complicating things, he and Arabel Sutherland are in love, and trying to conceal this from her father, Sir Henry.

== Hopalong Cassidy ==
Published: 9 October 1954 to 2 April 1960
Artists: Don Spiegle, Mike Western, Ian Kennedy, Peter Sutherland

A black-clad clean-cut sarsaparilla-swilling gunman defends the innocent in the Wild West, despite a leg injury.

- Initially reprints of the King Features Syndicate newspaper strip, before in-house material created from 13 April 1957.

== Jimmy Jingles' Time Machine ==
Published: 1 to 22 August 1942
Artist: Eric Parker

An experimental time machine transports young boy Jimmy Jingles back to the time of King Arthur.

== Johnnie Wingco ==
Published: 9 October 1954 to 14 May 1960
Writer: Ron Clarke
Artist: Mike Western

Master pilot Johnnie Wingco carries out a wide variety of daring flying missions across the globe.

- Promoted to the front cover from 19 October 1957. Later modified and reprinted as "Nick Shannon" in Film Fun and Buster.

== Jungle Drums ==
Published: 14 May to 16 July 1960
Artist: Hugo Pratt

A young European girl attempts to survive in the jungles of Africa.

- Modified reprints of Anna della Jungle.

== Kelly's Eye ==
Published: 21 July 1962 to 16 February 1963
Writer: Tom Tully
Artists: Francisco Solano López, Tom Kerr

After discovering a gem called the Eye of Zoltec in an ancient temple, Tim Kelly finds the stone makes him invulnerable.

- Continued in Valiant.

== Kiddo the Boy King ==
Published: 4 March 1939 to 15 June 1940
Artist: Frank Minnitt

A young king's antics and ideas keep his ministry busy.

- Cartoon strip.

== The King's Horses ==
Published: 24 March 1939 to 21 July 1945
Illustrator: Derek Eyles

- Text story.

== Kit Carson ==
Published: 3 December 1949 to 13 May 1950
Artist: Eric Parker

Heroic cowboy Kit Carson keeps order on the Old West frontier.

- Carson also made appearances in Cowboy Comics Library.

== Lucky Logan ==
Published: 23 August 1953 to 2 October 1954
Writer: Ron Clarke
Artists: Mike Western, Eric Bradbury, Graham Coton

Sheriff 'Lucky' Logan keeps order in the town of Horseshoe Bend.

== MacTavish of Red Rock ==
Published: 10 November 1962 to 16 February 1963
Artist: Mike Western

Dougal MacTavish arrives in the Wild West to take over a frontier ranch he has inherited. Soon those after the spread for their own reasons - including bandit Karl Bencher and a local Comanche tribe - find the burly, kilt-wearing Scot to be no pushover.

- Later modified and reprinted in Valiant as "The Laird of the Lazy Q".

== The Mad Emperor ==
Published: 23 July to 17 September 1960
Artist: Robert Forrest

Inheriting the Russian throne from his mother Catherine the Great, Emperor Paul I quickly causes problems with his insane behaviour. After comrade Nicholas Rostov is sentenced to Siberia for coughing in the Tsar's presence, Imperial Guard Captain Peter Gordanov begins to lose his confidence in the throne.

== Mark Trail, Forest Patrolman ==
Published: 17 February to 20 October 1951
Artist: Ed Dodd

Photojournalist and outdoor magazine writer Mark Trail's assignments lead him into danger and adventure.

- Reprints of the Post-Hall Syndicate newspaper strip.

== Matt Marriott ==
Published: 24 September 1960 to 10 June 1961
Artist: Tony Weare

Matt Marriott uses reason where he can and Colt Peacemaker six-shooters where he can't to keep order.

- Modified reprints of newspaper strips from The Evening News.

== Micky's Pal the Wizard ==
Published: 24 March 1939 to 11 September 1948 (text); 10 February to 31 March & 14 July to 21 July 1951 (strip)
Illustrators: Fred Bennett, Eric Parker, Hugh McNeill
Artists: Edgar Spencely, 'Rodger' (strip)

A close association with a wizard leads to adventures for Micky Roysham and his sister Betty.

== Mike, Spike and Greta ==
Published: 4 March 1939 to 27 April 1940
Artist: John Jukes

A pair of inept cowboys and their mule Greta seek their fortune.

- Cartoon strip.

== Nick and Nan and Stainless Stan ==
Published: 20 December 1947 to 28 February 1948
Artist: Eric Parker

Nick and Nan are treasure hunting with their uncle when his flying boat crashes. The trio are left stranded on a tropical island; their uncle fashions wreckage into the robot Stan to help them.

- An updated remake of "The Steam Man on Treasure Island".

== No. 13 Grimm Street ==
Published: 25 August to 17 November 1962

== Oliver Bold ==
Published: 11 March to 28 October 1961
Artist: Dino Battaglia

Swashbuckling English privateer Oliver Bold leads his crew on daring raids against Spanish bases in the Caribbean.

== Our Ernie ==
Published: 4 March 1939 to 16 July 1960
Artists: Charles E. Holt, Hugh McNeill, Frank Lazenby, Fred Robinson, A.J. Kelly, Reg Parlett, Denis Gifford, Ron Smith, Eric Bradbury

Wigan lad Ernie Entwhistle helps around the town.

- Cartoon strip.

== Percy and Steve ==
Published: 4 March 1939 to 14 October 1939
Artist: W. Ridgwell

A pair of football enthusiasts who routinely overestimate their skills and importance.

- Cartoon strip. Reprinted from Sports Budget.

== Peril from Below ==
Published: 7 July to 3 November 1962
Artist: Eric Bradbury

- Later reprinted in Buster.

== Pete Madden ==
Published: 27 May 1961 to 18 August 1962

Genius detective Pete Madden foils the schemes of numerous shadowy characters.

- Modified reprints of "Sexton Blake", and (after 28 April 1962) "Dick Barton" from The Comet.

== Peter the Whaler ==
Published: 20 November 1943 to April 22, 1944
Artist: Eric Parker

Peter LeFroy is eager to learn about life at sea and sneaks on board the whaling ship Black Swan, only to find the captain and first mate are tyrannical thugs.

== The Phantom Sheriff ==
Published: 31 May to 23rd August 1947
Artists: Eric Parker, Derek Eyles

A masked avenger protects the innocent in rural America.

== Pony Express ==
Published: 23 July to 29 October 1960
Artists: Geoff Campion, Bill Lacey

Good friends Buffalo Bill Cody and Texas Jack compete for the government's Pony Express franchise.

- Later reprinted in Tiger.

== Queer Adventures of Patsy and Tim ==
Published: 14 September 1940 to 7 November 1942
Artist: Eric Parker

Professor Digby invents the Dwindling Pill, capable of shrinking human beings. His nephew Tim and niece Patsy take them and are miniaturised for numerous adventures.

== Red Ryder ==
Published: 4 March 1939 to 24 February 1940
Artist: Fred Harman

Cowboy Red Ryder fends off cattle rustlers with trusty steed Thunder.

- Reprints of the NEA Service syndicated strip.

== The Rio Kid's Double ==
Published: 7 May 1949

A lookalike frames the cowboy known as the Rio Kid, who strives to clear his name.

== Robin Hood ==
Published: 25 June 1949 to 26 August 1950

Artists: Lunt Roberts, Patrick Nicolle Folk hero Robin Hood and his band of outlaws battle the cruel Sheriff of Nottingham.

== The Saga of Eric the Red ==
Published: 12 March to 30 April 1948
Writer: Leonard Matthews
Artist: Reginald Heade

Viking explorer Erik the Red sets out on an exciting voyage.

== Sexton Blake ==
Published: 4 March 1939 to 5 December 1953 (strip), 25 October 1952 to 4 April 1953 (text)
Writer: John Newton Chance (text)
Artists: Joseph Walker, Alfred Taylor, Eric Parker, Reginald Heade, Jack Grandfield, Robert MacGillivray, Roland Davies, Harry Dodd, Graham Coton (strip)
Illustrator: Robert MacGillivray (text)

Genius detective Sexton Blake foils the schemes of numerous shadowy characters.

== Slade ==
Published: 9 April to 16 July 1960
Artist: Jijé

Lone gunman Slade patrols the border of Texas and Mexico.

- Modified reprints of "Jerry Spring" from Spirou.

== Simon the Simple Sleuth ==
Published: 4 March 1939 to 15 June 1940
Artist: Hugh McNeill

Despite his bumbling inadequacies, an amateur detective always solves crimes.

- Cartoon strip.

== Sinbad Simms ==
Published: 13 April 1957 to 14 May 1960
Artist: Eric Roberts

The adventures of Sinbad Simms and his tame shark Jasper.

== Sitting Bull's Schooldays ==
Published: 21 July 1951 to 5 July 1952
Writer: Joan Whitford
Illustrators: Derek Eyles

Sitting Bull entertains the young of his tribe with tales of his youth.

- Text story.

== Smugglers' Creek ==
Published: 13 June to 15 August 1953
Artist: W. Bryce-Hamilton

Cornish lad Dick Treherne fights local nobleman James Mostyn's alliance with the villainous smuggler Black Patch.

== Space Age Kit ==
Published: 17 January 1959 to 4 June 1960
Artist: Bill Titcombe

The antics of schoolboy Kit and his family in the Britain of the future.

- Later reprinted in Tiger.

== The Space-Family Rollinson ==
See also Space-Family Rollinson

Published: 12 December 1953 to 26 July 1958
Artists: Graham Coton, Ian Kennedy

Dad and Mom Rollinson and their children Bob, Betsy, Joey and Joy are kidnapped by Zektron aliens, who then abandon them near Saturn.

== Spies of Spain ==
Published: 16 February to 12 April 1952
Artist: W. Bryce-Hamilton

In 1567 Martin and his sister Mary try to prevent the treasonous Lord Radnor from facilitating a Spanish invasion of Britain.

== Sporty ==
Published: 25 June 1949 to 16 February 1963
Artists: Reg Wootton

Amiable, diminutive Sporty tries his hand in a variety of outdoor activities, despite the whinging antics of lanky friend Sydney trying to spoil things.

- Cartoon strip. Unlike most AP/Fleetway strips of the period, Wootton was clearly credited. Continued in Valiant.

== Steadfast McStaunch ==
Published: 9 September 1950 to 14 June 1952
Artists: Denis Gifford

A doughty, determined anthropomorphic dog attempts to solve crimes.

- Cartoon strip. Gifford later redesigned the character for Whizzer and Chips.

== The Steam Man of Treasure Island ==
Published: 4 March 1939 to 10 February 1940
Artists: Joseph Walker, Norman Ward

When the Shamrock is wrecked on an uncharted island, Scots engineer Sandy builds a steam-powered robot to help himself, fellow crewmember Sailor Sammy and child passengers Rob and Jill survive.

== Stone-Henge Kit ==
Published: 4 March 1939 to 2 August 1952
Artists: Norman Ward, William Radford, A.J. Kelly, Hugh McNeill, Geoff Campion, Denis Gifford

Ancient Briton Kit causes trouble in his settlement.

- Cartoon strip. The story is mentioned in Alan Garner's novel Treacle Walker as the protagonist's favourite.

== Strongbow the Mohawk ==
Published: 28 October 1961 to 9 February 1963
Artist: Philip Mendoza

Mohawk tribesman Strongbow helps strangers and undertakes daring quests.

- Reprinted from The Comet.

== Tales of St. Clements ==
Published: 21 August 1948 to 6 April 1957
Writer: Percy Clarke (under the pseudonym Martin Frazer)
Illustrators: Robert Macdonald, Tom Laidler

The adventurers of pupils at an English boarding school.

- Text story.

== Texas John Slaughter ==
Published: 17 June 1961 to 5 May 1962
Artists: Tony Weare, Reg Bunn, R. Charles Roylance

Lawman John Slaughter brings in desperadoes and keeps invaders away from pioneer settlers.

- Modified reprints of "Buck Jones" from Cowboy Comics Library. The strip was tied in to the Walt Disney television series, complete with an in-character photograph of leading man Tom Tryon at the start of each instalment.

== Thunderbolt Jaxon ==
Published: 2 August 1958 to 23 January 1960
Artists: Ian Kennedy, George Partlett

Orphan Jack Jaxon discovers a magic belt that grants him the powers of Thor when in the service of good.

- Initially reprints of Australia/New Zealand title Thunderbolt Jaxon. Later modified and reprinted as "Johnny Samson" in Buster.

== Tommy Hawk and Mo Cassin ==
Published: 4 March 1939 to 28 October 1939
Artist: Denis Gifford

Two Native American Braves irritate the rest of their tribe with their antics.

- Cartoon strip. Later reprinted in Valiant.

== Tough Todd and Happy Annie ==
Published: 24 March 1939 to 1 February 1941 & 19 April 1941 (text); 27 December 1947 to 2 April 1960 (strip)
Writer: Leonard Matthews (strip)
Illustrators: Eric Parker, Derek Eyles (text)
Artist: Hugh McNeill (strip)

Two children escape a cruel orphanage and search for a new home.

- The initial text stories were called "The Runaway Orphans". Todd and Annie also featured in the concurrent strip "A Christmas Carol" from 4 December 1948 and 1 January 1949; also drawn by McNeill, this featured the Charles Dickens novel being read to the pair. A similar conceit was later used for the strip adaptations of The Secret Garden (5 November to 26 November 1949, in which the pair attended a screening of the film) and Black Beauty (5 January to 9 February 1952, when the Anna Sewell book was again read to the characters).

== Will o' the Woods ==
Published: 26 April 1941 to 23 April 1943; 26 July to 8 November 1952
Illustrators: Derek Eyles (1941-1943), W. R. Calvert (1952)

- Text story.

== Literary adaptations ==
=== Gulliver's Travels ===
Published: 26 December 1942 to 26 March 1943
Artist: Eric Parker

- Based on the novel by Jonathan Swift.

=== Stories from the Arabian Nights ===
Published: 3 April to 12 May 1943
Artist: Eric Parker

- Based on the translations by Antoine Galland.

=== Mr Midshipman Easy ===
Published: 29 April to 11 November 1944
Artist: Eric Parker

- Based on the novel by Frederick Marryat.

=== The Children of the New Forest ===
Published: 27 January to 16 June 1945
Writer: Percy Clarke
Artist: Eric Parker

- Based on the novel by Frederick Marryat.

=== Treasure Island ===
Published: 23 June to 3 November 1945
Writer: Percy Clarke
Artist: Michael Hubbard

- Based on the novel by Robert Louis Stevenson.

=== Kidnapped ===
Published: 10 November 1945 to 9 March 1946
Artist: Eric Parker

- Based on the novel by Robert Louis Stevenson.

=== The Coral Island ===
Published: 16 March to 28 July 1946
Artist: Michael Hubbard

- Based on the novel by R. M. Ballantyne.

=== The Three Musketeers ===
Published: 3 August to 21 December 1946
Writer: Leonard Matthews
Artist: Eric Parker

- Based on the novel by Alexandre Dumas.

=== Westward Ho! ===
Published: 28 December 1946 to 24 May 1947
Artist: Eric Parker

Based on the novel by Charles Kingsley.

=== The Black Arrow ===
Published: 27 March to 10 June 1948
Artist: Eric Parker

- Based on the novel by Robert Louis Stevenson.

== Film adaptations ==
=== The Adventures of Robin Hood ===
Published: 21 June to 20 September 1947
Artist: Michael Hubbard

- Based on the Warner Bros. film.

=== Sinbad the Sailor ===
Published: 27 September to 13 December 1947
Artist: Michael Hubbard

- Based on the RKO film.

=== Dick Turpin's Ride to York ===
Published: 17 July to 11 September 1948
Writer: Leonard Matthews
Artist: Dick Eyles

- Based on the Stoll Pictures film.

=== The Exile ===
Published: 18 September to 30 October 1948
Artist: Eric Parker

- Based on the Universal-International Pictures film.

=== Bonnie Prince Charlie ===
Published: 22 January to 29 January 1949
Artist: Alfred Taylor

- Based on the London film.

=== Red River ===
Published: 5 February to 5 March 1949
Artist: Michael Hubbard

- Based on the United Artists film.

=== Cardboard Cavalier ===
Published: 4 June to 18 June 1949
Artist: Norman Pett

- Based on the Two Cities film.

=== The Iron Mask ===
Published: 4 June to 29 October 1949
Writer: Edward Holmes
Artist: W. Bryce-Hamilton

- Based on the United Artists film.

=== The Captain from Castile ===
Published: 9 July to 17 September 1949
Artists: Reginald Heade, Norman Pett

- Based on the 20th Century Fox film.

=== Buccaneer's Girl ===
Published: 11 March to 15 April 1950
Artist: Robert MacGillivray

- Based on the Universal Pictures film.

=== The Happiest Days of Your Life ===
Published: 25 March to 6 May 1950
Artist: 'Rodger'

- Based on the London film.

=== Ambush ===
Published: 1 July to 26 August 1950
Artist: Roland Davies

- Based on the MGM film.

=== Indian Scout ===
Published: 30 September to 6 December 1950

- Based on the United Artists film.

=== The Flame and the Arrow ===
Published: 27 January to 31 March 1951
Artist: Ron Smith

- Based on the Warner Bros. film.
