= Knockout (British comics) =

British weekly comic

- The cover to the 1 July, 1939 issue of Knock-Out Comic.

Publication information
- Publisher: Amalgamated Press; Fleetway Publications; IPC
- Schedule: Weekly
- Format: Ongoing series
- Genre: Action/adventure, humor/comedy
- Publication date: 4 March 1939 – 16 February 1963
- No. of issues: 1227

Creative team
- Written by: Ron Clarke; Leonard Matthews
- Artist(s): Derek Eyles; Denis Gifford; Hugh McNeill; Frank Minnitt; Eric Parker; Reg Wootton
- Editor(s): Edward Holmes (1939 to 1940, 1946 to 1948); Percy Clarke (1940 to 1946); Leonard Matthews (1948 to 1956); Arthur Bouchier (1956 to 1960); George J. Allen (1960 to 1963)

Knockout (launched as The Knock-Out Comic, and also known as The Knock-Out and Knock-Out Comic at various times) was a weekly British comics periodical published by Amalgamated Press and later Fleetway Publications and IPC Magazines from 4 March 1939 to 16 February 1963. A boys' adventure comic, the title ran for 1227 issues before being merged with Valiant.

== Creation ==
Since consolidating his various titles into Amalgamated Press in 1902, Alfred Harmsworth had built one of the largest publishing empires in the world over the first quarter of the 20th century. As well as some of Britain's largest newspapers (which included founding Daily Mail and Daily Mirror, as well as buying out The Times, The Sunday Times and The Observer), Amalgamated Press also dominated story papers, with early successes Comic Cuts and Illustrated Chips joined by the likes of The Gem, The Magnet, School Friend, The Champion and The Schoolgirl. Initially designed to undercut the infamous 'penny dreadfuls' with a halfpenny price, the story paper was roughly equivalent to the American pulp magazine - containing prose fiction interspersed with illustrations and the occasional short cartoon, designed to be sold to children as disposable casual reading material. However a challenge emerged from rival DC Thomson. In 1937 the Scottish publisher launched Dandy Comic and the following year The Beano. While still featuring illustrated prose stories, these led with comic strips of the type which were dominating children's fiction in America and mainland Europe, using sequential artwork and speech bubbles to tell the stories. AP's first response was the entertainment personality-focused Radio Fun, and after it launched well Harmsworth assigned editor Edward Holmes to craft a second title, this time freed from the celebrity format, with Leonard Matthews as sub-editor.

== Publication history ==
=== The Knock-Out ===
Holmes initially proposed a weekly title entirely consisting of the new picture stories but AP executives baulked at such a radical departure. Instead, only three would run in the first issue. "The Steam Man on Treasure Island" featured the small crew of the tramp steamer Shamrock becoming marooned on a tropical island, aided by a mechanical steam-powered robot built by the ship's engineer. Drawn initially by Joseph Walker (with Norman Ward later taking over); AP's stalwart detective Sexton Blake, even then 45 years old, tackled the Hooded Stranger; and the National Editorial Association's syndicated Red Ryder cowboy strip was licensed and modified. At this point, the strips featured speech bubbles for dialogue but utilised large narrative captions under each frame; indeed, these were added to "Red Ryder" for British readers.

Text stories were instead equally represented, consisting of "The Runaway Orphans" (introducing Tod and Annie, who would appear often over the next twenty years), "The King's Horses" and "Mickey's Pal, the Wizard". The remainder of the 28 pages were given over to a variety of cartoons, including "Our Crazy Broadcasters" (a celebrity strip originally intended for Radio Fun) and the mishaps of greedy public schoolboy Billy Bunter. Like Sexton Blake, Bunter already a staple of AP's older story papers, and was ripe for the cartoon format, with initial episodes of 'the fattest boy on Earth' drawn by Charles H. Chapman. The cartoon section was largely shaped by the sense of humour of Hugh McNeill, recently tempted from DC Thomson and encouraged to break AP's mould. He responsible for "Deed-a-Day Danny" and "Simon, the Simple Sleuth", and collaborated on "Ali Barber" with Frank Minnitt. Minnitt himself contributed "Kiddo the Boy King", "Merry Margie, Invisible Mender" and "Bob's Your Uncle" to the opening line-up. Other debutants included "Stone-Henge Kit" and "Our Ernie". McNeill's cartoons soon became one of the title's most enduring and popular features.

Priced at 2d, featuring four-colour front and back covers and black-and-white interiors, the first issue of The Knock-Out was dated 4 March, 1939. (Note: British periodicals of the time featured the off-sale date as a cover date) In order to tempt in new readers, Amalgamated Press funded an attractive scheme of free gifts to boost the first month's appeal; the first issue included either a 'Tuck Hamper' of sweets or a paint-box and brush, depending on the copy; the second came with a painting book; the third a 'zoo album' with four printed cards to stick into it, and the fourth the remaining quartet of animal portraits. The tactic worked, and The Knock-Out was swiftly a sales success.

A little over six months after its launch, World War II broke out. Initially this meant little change to the comic, which debuted "Buffalo Bill" and "The Queer Adventures of Patsy and Tim" in place of the Steam Man and Red Ryder. However, Nazi Germany's rapid invasion of much of Western Europe meant, among other things, that paper was rationed.

=== Knock-Out Comic ===
Renamed Knock-Out Comic in March 1940, during the conflict the page count fell to 14 pages and the colour was removed. Percy Clarke took over as editor for the duration of the war; to reduce the impact of military call-ups (McNeill was among the AP staff who would serve in the conflict) a move was made towards shorter serials, including a strand of literary adaptations, beginning with "Gulliver's Travels" and later including the likes of "Mr. Midshipman Easy", "Treasure Island" and "The Coral Island".

=== Knock-Out Comic and Magnet ===
On 15 June 1940 Knock-Out Comic incorporated the venerable Magnet, one of several wartime mergers forced as much for practical reasons as for financial concerns. The war also had an effect on the stories themselves; "The Happy Vakkies", a cartoon depicting evacuees enjoying fun adventures, debuted in the first Knock-Out Comic and Magnet while Sexton Blake would put his skills at the disposal of the Special Service Brigade until 1944. Other new stories of the time included "Will o' the Woods" and "Outlaw Kid".

=== Knockout Comic ===
After the end of the war the comic gradually returned to its previous size, and - after a period where adaptations of popular films superseded the literary stories - returned to more ambitious picture strips, with Holmes returning to the editor's seat in 1946. The long-running school text story "Tales of St. Clements" start in August 1948, while November debuted the picture strip swashbuckler "Captain Flame".

=== Knockout ===
The following year saw AP purchase rival J. B. Allen, and their competing boys' papers, Sun and The Comet. Holmes was moved across to the latter, with Leonard Matthews taking over as editor; around the same time the title of the comic was modified again to simply Knockout. Matthews introduced the likes of "Kit Carson", spy story "Captain Phantom" and the return of the runaway orphans in "Tough Todd and Happy Annie" while hiring a fresh wave of artists including Sep E. Scott, H. M. Brock, D. C. Eyles and Geoff Campion.

=== Knockout and Comic Cuts ===
In 1953 the title consumed the venerable Comic Cuts. Three months later Sexton Blake, the only surviving serial of Knockout's first issue, was dropped in favour of science fiction caper "Space Family Rollinson", a sign of AP's awareness of the cultural shift brought on by Hulton Press' smash hit Eagle and the nascent Space Race. Other changes saw strips based on Hopalong Cassidy and Davy Crockett appearing, as both featured in popular films.

=== Knockout ===
The title had reverted to plain Knockout again in 1954, and would stay that way for the rest of the title's life. In 1956 Matthews moved upstairs to managing editor of AP's boys' adventure group and the editorship of Knockout passed to Arthur Bouchier. Among his commissions were "Ginger Tom", later retitled "Firebrand the Red Knight". A more fantastical strip was "Thunderbolt Jaxon", about a boy who could become the god Thor via a magical belt. The character had been created for an "American-style" title bearing his name for AP's line in Australia and New Zealand; his antipodean escapades had been printed in a 'Mighty Midget' comic insert given away with the July 1957 issues of Knockout. Positive reader response saw Jaxon join the main comic in August, and new material saw his adventures run until 1960.

1959 had seen Amalgamated Press brought out by IPC/Fleetway, and Knockout was looking outdated compared to much of the competition. The following year Bouchier moved over to Air Ace Picture Library, with George J. Allen installed as editor. At the new owners' behest, he oversaw a modernisation of the title, and the likes of "Tough Todd and Happy Annie" and "Hopalong Cassidy" were wound down. A more relevant Western, "Texas John Slaughter", was produced (albeit by modifying existing strips) to take advantage of the popular Disney TV show. Elsewhere, Sexton Blake adventures were modernised and converted to the adventures of a detective by the name of Pete Madden, while Battler Britton was transferred from Sun to take the place of Johnny Wingco. More fantasy-tinged strips were introduced - "From the Vaults of Time" introduced Professor Kraken as a scientist intent on reintroducing dinosaurs to present day England and "Kelly's Eye" introduced Tim Kelly, an adventurer who discovered the invulnerability-granting Eye of Zoltec. The latter pair featured artwork from Francisco Solano López, one of several Spanish artists hired by Fleetway at the time who would go on to greatly contribute to British comics over the next decade.

The makeover of Knockout was considered a success by Fleetway, at least in terms of reader response. The same principles were carried over to the creation of the all-new Valiant, which launched in 1962 to huge sales. However, Knockout itself was soon eclipsed by the newcomer and after the 16 March 1963 edition it was folded into Valiant after 1227 issues and 24 years.

=== Valiant and Knockout ===
"From the Vaults of Time", "Kelly's Eye" and "Billy Bunter" would survive to join the renamed Valiant and Knockout. The title reverted to Valiant in February 1964, and would be outlived by all three strips. Kraken appeared in further serials until September 1964, Tim Kelly would have more than a decade of further adventures and Billy Hunter would remain with Valiant until it was subsumed itself by Battle Picture Weekly in 1976. Unlike many later cancelled titles, Fleetway did not continue the Knockout Annual after the weekly' demise, with the last such book dated 1962 (Note: British annuals were dated the year after publication). However, in 1971 Fleetway reused the title for an otherwise-unrelated (and ultimately less long-lived) weekly humour comic.

== Title ==
- The Knock-Out 4 March 1939 to 23 February 1940
- Knock-Out Comic 2 March 1940 to 8 June 1940
- Knock-Out Comic and Magnet 15 June 1940 to 2 February 1946
- Knock-Out Comic 9 February 1946 to 11 December 1948
- Knockout 18 December 1948 to 12 September 1953
- Knockout and Comic Cuts 19 September 1953 to 20 March 1954
- Knockout 27 March 1953 to 16 February 1963
- Valiant and Knockout 23 March 1963 to 2 February 1964

== Spinoffs ==
- Knock-Out Fun Book (5 issues, 1941 to 1945)
- Knockout Fun Book (11 issues, 1946 to 1956)
- Knockout Annual (6 issues, 1957 to 1962)
