= Leonard Matthews =

British editor, publisher, writer and illustrator of comics and children's magazines

- Born: 10 October 1914 Islington, London, England
- Died: 9 November 1997 (aged 83) Esher, Surrey, England
- Areas: Writer, Artist, Editor, Publisher
- Notable works: Amalgamated Press children's titles Look and Learn

Leonard James Matthews (10 October 1914 – 9 November 1997) was an English editor, publisher, writer and illustrator of comics and children's magazines, best known as the founder of the educational magazine Look and Learn.

== Early life ==
Born in Islington, London, on 10 October 1914, he joined the Amalgamated Press (AP) as an editorial assistant in 1939, starting as a sub-editor on the weekly comic Knockout under editor Percy Clarke. Matthews persuaded cartoonist Hugh McNeill, then working for rival DC Thomson's comics The Beano and The Dandy, to go freelance and work for AP. McNeill contributed Deed-a-Day Danny and Simon the Simple Sleuth to Knockout's initial lineup, and remained a mainstay of AP's comics for the rest of his life; he and Matthews remained friends until McNeill died in 1969.

== RAF and WWII ==
Matthews served in the RAF during the Second World War, and also compiled training manuals for the Air Ministry in London. He volunteered as a fire lookout, and saved AP's offices at Fleetway House from burning down during an air raid. After the war he returned to Knockout, becoming editor in 1948. He featured more adventure strips, including adaptations of classic adventure novels, scripting some of them, including The Three Musketeers, drawn by Eric Parker. He wrote the pirate strip Captain Flame for artist Sep E. Scott, and Dick Turpin serials for H. M. Brock and D. C. Eyles. He was also an artist, drawing strips like Daffy the Cowboy Tec for Knockout.

== Comics career ==
In 1949 he became editor of a second comic, Sun, acquired by AP from rival publisher J. B. Allen. Again, he increased the adventure content, hiring Geoff Campion to draw Billy the Kid, and introducing new characters like Max Bravo and Battler Britton. In 1950 he launched Cowboy Comics, a digest-sized series repackaging western comics originated for the Australian market, and later became editor of Thriller Comics, which published historical adventure stories in the same format. He scripted several of them, including adaptations of Lorna Doone and Quentin Durward.

In the 1950s he became Managing Editor of Amalgamated Press's comics, including the girls' and nursery titles as well as the boys' titles. In 1958 Amalgamated Press was bought by the Mirror Group and renamed Fleetway Publications, and in 1961 Matthews was named Director of Juvenile Publications, and launched several new titles, including Princess, Buster and War Picture Library. In 1962 he launched Look and Learn, a lavishly illustrated weekly magazine inspired by the Italian magazines Conoscere and La Vita Meravigliosa, and in 1965 launched Ranger, which combined educational features with comic strips, such as Rob Riley and the highly regarded Rise and Fall of the Trigan Empire. Whilst Mike Butterworth is credited as the author of the Trigan Empire, it was Leonard Matthews who initiated the original concept, as Butterworth explained:

The original impetus was from that veritable genius Leonard Matthews, then my senior group editor when I was editing Sun and Comet. He threw the first introductory script at me and told me to take it from there. He had no idea where to further it but he knew where to look for a guy who did...

Nicknamed "Napoleon of the Comics," while at Fleetway, Matthews nonetheless left the company at the end of 1968 to set up his own company, Martspress, packaging comics and juvenile publications like TV21 and Once Upon a Time for City Magazines.

A small man, Matthews liked to have tall men working for him. In addition, no employee was allowed to have a beard or they'd be sacked.

== Death ==
Matthews died in Esher, Surrey, on 9 November 1997.
