= Thriller Comics =

- Thriller Comics #28: "The Return of Captain Flame", art by Septimus E. Scott, 1952.

Publication information
- Publisher: Amalgamated Press / Fleetway Publications
- Schedule: Biweekly; weekly
- Format: Ongoing series
- Genre: Action/adventure
- Publication date: November 1951 – May 1963
- No. of issues: 450
- Main character(s): Robin Hood; Dick Turpin; Three Musketeers; Buffalo Bill; Wild Bill Hickok; Captain Flame; Max Bravo; Battler Britton

Creative team
- Artist(s): D. C. Eyles, Mike Hubbard, Eric Parker, Septimus E. Scott
- Editor(s): Edward Holmes; Leonard Matthews

Thriller Comics, later titled Thriller Comics Library and even later Thriller Picture Library, was a British comic book magazine, published in series of digest sized issues by the Amalgamated Press, later Fleetway Publications, from November 1951 to May 1963: 450 issues in all, originally two per month, later four.

Its stories were mainly historical adventure, featuring classic characters such as Robin Hood, Dick Turpin and the Three Musketeers, western characters such as Buffalo Bill and Wild Bill Hickok, adaptations of classic adventure novels and films, and original characters such as Captain Flame, Max Bravo and Battler Britton, either originated for the title or reprinted from other AP titles including Knockout, Sun and Comet. Artists featured included D. C. Eyles, Mike Hubbard, Eric Parker and Septimus E. Scott. Its original editor was Edward Holmes, succeeded in 1952 by Leonard Matthews.
