= Ron Smith (comics) =

English comic artist (1928–2019)

- Born: Ronald George Smith; 1928 Southampton, England
- Died: 10 January 2019 (aged 90)
- Area: Artist
- Notable works: Judge Dredd

Ronald George Smith (1928 – 10 January 2019) was an English comic artist whose career spanned almost fifty years. Primarily producing strips for the two main publishers, DC Thomson and IPC Magazines, Smith was best known for drawing Judge Dredd for 2000 AD and the Daily Star.

== Biography ==
=== Early life and work ===
Smith was born in Bournemouth in 1928, the son of a structural engineer. He studied to become an engineer himself, but his studies were interrupted by the outbreak of World War II. Smith enlisted as a pilot with the Empire Flying Training Programme, and ended up flying mark 19 Spitfires (a photo-reconnaissance model). He was demobbed in 1947, and joined the Gaumont British animation studio, alongside future comics artists Mike Western and Eric Bradbury.

After Gaumont British's parent company, the Rank Organisation, went bust in 1949, Smith found work drawing comics for the Amalgamated Press under editor Leonard Matthews, starting on Knockout with humour strips like "Deed-a-Day Danny" and "Young Joey". His first adventure strip was an adaptation of the Burt Lancaster film The Flame and the Arrow in 1951. More adventure work, including "Ryan of the Redcoats" and adaptations of the western films Buffalo Stampede and The Last Outpost for The Comet, followed. He also contributed art for the Eagle.

=== D. C. Thomson ===
In 1952 he was hired by D. C. Thomson & Co. as an illustrator for boys' story papers like Hotspur, Adventure and The Wizard under editor R. D. Low. Smith was now married with a child and no longer wanted to live in bomb-damaged London, so Thomsons bought him a house outside Dundee, where they had their headquarters, paid for from deductions from his wages. He also drew for their girls' comics Bunty and Judy.

In 1963 he was sent to South Africa by The Scotsman newspaper to find Jeannie Stewart of the anti-apartheid group Black Sash, who had been sending the paper material but had been stopped by the South African authorities. Because his passport gave his profession as "artist", rather than "journalist", it was felt he would arouse less suspicion. He found her and, after going on safari in the Kruger National Park to maintain his cover as a tourist, was able to bring some material back for the paper.

In 1972 he left D. C. Thomson's staff and went freelance, moving to Surrey, although he continued to draw for Thomsons' comics, primarily Hotspur. Strips he drew included "The Cowboy Cricketer", and "Nick Jolly", a fantasy story about an eighteenth-century highwayman brought forward in time by well-meaning aliens to fight the sinister arch-villain Simon Death on his robotic, jet-powered horse Bess. He pushed for Thomsons to publish superhero strips, and was eventually given the go-ahead to create "King Cobra", who first appeared in Hotspur in 1976 and ran until 1980. Other titles he drew for include humour titles The Topper, The Dandy and The Beezer, and boys' adventure titles The Victor and Warlord, for which he drew "Drake of E-Boat Alley" and "Codename Warlord". He also did some uncredited work for Marvel Comics in the USA.

=== 2000 AD ===
In 1979 he began drawing "Judge Dredd" for IPC's 2000 AD, and during the early to mid-1980s, Ron Smith was among the most prolific artists working on the character. Along with Brian Bolland and Mike McMahon he contributed to two of the character's most popular epic-length stories, "The Day the Law Died" and "The Judge Child".

Amongst the more grotesque characters created by Smith was Otto Sump, Mega-City One's ugliest man, with Smith excelling himself in "The Otto Sump Ugly Clinic" depicting the horrific length citizens of the metropolis go to in making themselves look as physically repulsive as possible. Smith was responsible for the majority of ugly-spin-off stories including "Gunge", "Who Killed Pug Ugly?" about an ugly pop star and "The League of Fatties" about over-eaters gone to extremes (although the first Fatty story was actually drawn by McMahon in a previous Annual). The "Get Ugly!" 2000AD cover has been used at least twice as a T-shirt design. Other Dredd stories drawn by Smith were the Pat Mills scripted "Blood of Satanus" where he depicted a man's transformation into a blood-thirsty Tyrannosaur/human hybrid, "The Hot-Dog Run" featuring a group of cadet Judges on a training mission in the Cursed Earth and "The Graveyard Shift", an extended narrative covering one typically crime-filled night in Mega-City One. Ron Smith also co-created the anti-hero Chopper in "Unamerican Graffiti" and Dave the orang-utan who became Mayor of Mega-City One. Smith also created some of the most memorable 2000 AD cover images, and produced a number of other strips produced for the comic, including "Rogue Trooper" and "Chronos Carnival".

Smith went on to draw for other IPC titles, including M.A.S.K., Eagle, Wildcat and Toxic Crusaders before retiring in the 1990s.

=== Daily Star ===
Smith drew the weekly Dredd strip for the Daily Star newspaper.

== Bibliography ==
=== D. C. Thomson ===
- Warlord
  - "Codename Warlord", No. 3, 10, 17, 22, 29, 59, 68, 75, 95, 116
  - "Drake of E-Boat Alley", #20–36
  - Cover, No. 12
- Hotspur
  - "Nick Jolly", #787–816, 819
  - Covers, Hotspur Annual, 1976, 1978, 1980, 1981, 1982
- The Victor
  - "The Menace in Pit 19", #29–36

=== IPC/Fleetway ===
- 2000AD
  - "Judge Dredd", No. 104, 106–108, 111–112, 117–119, 121–25, 128–29, 131–32, 134–35, 137, 140–43, 148, 152–54, 157–59, 164–65, 167–69, 173–75, 179–81, 186–89, 192, 197–200, 202–03, 206–07, 209–223, 233–35, 237–244, 273–74, 280, 289–290 & 295, 300–03, 315–18, 329–330, 335–341, 346–49, 356–58, 366–68, 377–383, 387–89, 393–407, 414–15, 421–22, 430–33, 436, 442, 445–46 & 448–49, 499, 700–701, 824, 835–836, 855, 873–879, 895–896, 899. (1979–1994)
  - "Survivor", #639–644 (1989)
  - "Tales from the Doghouse: Moosey", #649 (1989)
  - "Chronos Carnival"
  - "Rogue Trooper", #712–723, 776–779(1991–1992)
  - "Harlem Heroes", #776–779 (1992)

=== Marvel UK ===
- Transformers No. 84 "Target:2006: Part 4 – Wreck and Rule!" (with Simon Furman, Marvel UK, 1986, collected in Target 2006, 136 pages, Titan Books, August 2002, ISBN 1-84023-510-1, IDW Publishing, January 2008, ISBN 1-60010-148-8)
