= Rob Riley (comic strip) =

British comic strip

Rob Riley was a British comic strip, drawn by Stanley Houghton, that appeared in every issue of the comic Ranger from 20 November 1965. After forty issues, Rob Riley and The Trigan Empire were transferred to Look and Learn; it continued to be featured during the 1960s and 1970s.

== Concept ==
Rob Riley was a fairly realistic strip about an eponymous contemporary British schoolboy. The story follows Rob from adolescence as he begins secondary school through to adulthood, by which time he is employed as a private detective. At one point he obtained a scholarship to a public school, the strip dealt with the social issues this raised. Slightly unusually for its time, he had a black friend.

It is set in the fictional town of Westhaven-on-Sea. Originally, this town was based upon Dartmouth in Devon, although the later aerial pictures show the town as being an oyster-shaped bay. Dartmouth Castle is shown in the first instalment as well as an amalgamation of Dartmouth and Kingswear.
