= War Picture Library =

British war comic magazine

- Cover to War Picture Library No. 1 – "Fight Back to Dunkirk", 1 September 1958

Publication information
- Publisher: IPC Magazines, Amalgamated Press/Fleetway Publications
- Schedule: Bi-monthly/Weekly
- Genre: War
- Publication date: Sep 1958 to Dec 1984
- No. of issues: 2,103

Creative team
- Written by: Various
- Artist(s): Various; including F. Solano López, Jose Ortiz, Ramon de la Fuente, Luis Ramos and Hugo Pratt, Faruk Geç

Collected editions
- Unleash Hell: ISBN 1-85375-629-6
- Against All Odds: ISBN 1-85375-629-6
- Up and at 'em!: ISBN 1-85375-698-9

War Picture Library was a British 64-page "pocket library" war comic magazine title published by Amalgamated Press/Fleetway (now owned by IPC Magazines) for 2103 issues. Each issue featured a complete story, beginning on 1 September 1958 with "Fight Back to Dunkirk" and finishing 26 years later on 3 December 1984 with "Wings of the Fleet". The editor was Ted Bensberg. Assistant editors included Geoff Kemp and Brian Smith. Other editorial staff included Pat Brookman, Terence Magee, Clive Ranger, Tony Power and Clive McGee. Art editor was Mike Jones and art assistant was his brother Dave Jones. Other art assistants at various times were Roy McAdorey, Geoff Berwick, Bill Reid and John Fearnley.

Companion titles Air Ace Picture Library (1960–1970) and Action Picture Library (1969–1970) were both folded into the longer-running War Picture Library in later years.

== Publication history ==
Launched in September, 1958, the Amalgamated Press/Fleetway title War Picture Library was one of the earliest (arguably the earliest) "pocket library" titles, and in particular one of the first to feature stories set during World War II. Comprising 64 pages, the tales were, according to writer and editor Steve Holland "page turner[s] of the first order, a shilling shocker that grabbed [the] attention" of a – primarily – young audience. Written and illustrated, at least in early years, "by creators who had lived through the war themselves, many on the front line", War Picture Library was able to show clearly to its target audience "what [the reader's] fathers and uncles had been through in combat". Holland said that War Picture Library brought the Second World War to life "[i]n all its grim glory".

The stories were not limited to tales of combat, some set in "the bomb-torn streets of London during the blitz", although the bulk of the stories released several times a month for over 2000 issues were set in all fields of combat. Crucially, reflecting the cultural shifts in popular fiction, the war stories did not always feature "a heroic journey", nor yet were all characters automatically "gung-ho" stereotypes: "[a] diversity of characters", human emotion and even some considerable sympathy for 'the enemy' was not out-of-place in some tales.

. . . cowards and glory seekers could be found in some episodes; spies and traitors rubbed shoulders with our staunchly loyal heroes in others. Neither were all of the stories purely about killing the enemy; some of them were dedicated to saving lives even in the midst of the carnage of war.

Running until late 1984, "War Picture Library was a monthly window into a six-year global storm that affected every family in Britain". The first-hand knowledge of many of its creators also enabled the stories to ring true, and disclose – in sometimes simplified, and always fictionalised terms – the truth behind the stories told in history books.

[The stories] helped the two generations of children that grew up following VE Day make sense of the catastrophic consequences of war and the sacrifices that were made.

=== Creators ===
Uncredited from the start, as were the vast majority of comic books written and drawn in the late 1950s and early 1960s, War Picture Library continued the trend of UK-based comics publishers such as D. C. Thomson and publisher Fleetway in continuing not to credit on-page the names of its creators.

Many names – and before them, styles – became familiar to UK comics readers, however, and still more names have been documented over recent years. Contributors to War Picture Library included artists such as Fred Holmes, Giorgio Trevisan, Harry Farrugia, George Heath, G. R. Parvin, Nevio Zeccara, Annibale Casabianca, F. Solano López, Juan Gonzalez Alacreu, Jose Ortiz, Ramon de la Fuente, Jorge Moliterni, Renzo Calegari, Faruk Geç, Luis Ramos, Gino D'Antonio, Carlos Pino and Hugo Pratt.

Writers are often harder to identify, but among those identified by Steve Holland (et al.) are Donne Avenell, Ian Kellie, Douglas Leach, Willie Patterson, Alf Wallace, David Satherley, Roger P. Clegg, A. Carney Allen and S & J Thomas, also Gordon Brunt, author of 40 Air Ace Picture Library issues between 1961 and 1969.

=== Hallmarks ===
War Picture Library was among the first war comic to use real dates, places, settings, battles and (occasionally) battalions to more accurately place the stories in the historical action, even if the stories themselves were fictional. This came about largely because so many of the (early) writers and artists had actually fought in the battles they wrote about and drew. Steve Holland cites the example of G. R. Parvin, a "relatively minor contributor to the war libraries", who "was captured and made a P.O.W. by the Japanese". Parvin's story is told in the autobiographical Yasumai! (Digit Books, 1958), and "[a]t least one" of his contributions to War Picture Library (as well as Battle Picture Library) "was set around the Railroad of Death in Burma".

As with most war picture libraries, the equipment was accurately depicted in addition to the settings, although unlike some, War Picture Library was not averse to making central characters out of individuals usually associated with relatively minor overall roles. The often-realistic writing even downplayed the differences between the sides, treating some German frontline soldiers as – like the British – discrete individuals caught up in their wartime role, who were not wholly evil and did not always wish to fight, as wartime propaganda so often suggested. Nevertheless, due in part to the ultimately patriotic nature of many of the stories, and the time in which some were created, some racist stereotyping occasionally crept in.

Stories of self-sacrifice, such as that of Captain John Locke in "The Valley of Death" (War Picture Library No. 120 (Nov 1961), art by Jose Ortiz) were not uncommon, and were frequently depicted as serving a greater good and having a large, wider impact on the course of the war (in Locke's case, Operation Broadway). Some tales would also provide a certain amount of levity, and even slapstick comedy, such as the mildly farcical tale of Corporal Tagg in the Donne Avenell-penned "Snarl of Battle" (War Picture Library No. 162 (Sep 1962), art by Ramon de la Fuente), which also highlighted very serious issues including the often stark discrepancies between the men who engaged in action and those who took (or were given) the credit.

=== Memorable stories ===
Stories written for all the war comics were able to bring attention to lesser-known battles and actions, as well as highlight those instantly memorable. In addition, in one issue, a narrative could be followed from training, through action to heroism – and/or death. WPL No. 22 (July 1959) featured "The Invisible Enemy", set during the Battle of the Bulge, and dealing with Nazi war crimes such as the execution of prisoners; issue #54 (June 1960)'s "Umbrella in the Sky" provided a fictionalised account of RAF pilots flying Hurricanes to Russia providing aid to Britain's then-ally during the German assaults. Issue #1151 "Fix Bayonets" (December 1975) followed four conscripts from their initial training until their eventual action in Italy, where two are killed: one heroically, one pointlessly – aptly highlighting the dichotomy between different forms of 'death in action' and providing a story all the more poignant for having followed their careers for so long.

== Legacy ==
One of the earliest "Picture/Pocket library" titles, War Picture Library saw a slew of imitators and sister-publications spring up, including arguably the title's more-famous rival war pocket library: Commando (D. C. Thomson), in 1961. Perennial rival publishers D. C. Thomson and Amalgamated Press/Fleetway competed for readers and launched between them dozens of comics in pocket format – some spun off from or reprinting existing titles, others providing new twists on the adventure serial. Two of Fleetway's sister-publications – Air Ace Picture Library and Action Picture Library – were ultimately folded into War Picture Library. Such mergers were commonplace in the UK (and US) markets, and Air Ace was on its own published for 545 issues over a full decade (Jan 1960 – Nov 1970) before being merged.

In addition to the multiple war-related titles, others dealing with cowboys/westerns and spies sprang up, as did titles from smaller publishers such as GM Smith/Micron, M V Features, Pearson Publications and Famepress Publications, among others. Titles were also translated into several languages, and sold around the world. In Italy the stories were very successful and published since the 60s as the popular Collana Eroica and Super Eroica magazines.

== War Picture Library content ==
- List of War Picture Library titles

There were 2103 individual titles, as well as War Picture Library Holiday Special, which was published annually from 1963 to 1990.

== Collected editions ==
Starting in 2008, Carlton Books imprint Prion Books began reprinting – under licence from DC Comics, current rights owner of the IPC Media titles – selected issues of War Picture Library as part of their UK comics reprints stable. Two volumes of 12 comics each have so far been produced, with a further volume of 11 comics published in 2009 and a smaller volume containing six comics in 2010:

- Unleash Hell: War Picture Library Collection No. 1, by Steve Holland (ed.) (Carlton Books/Prion, September 2007) ISBN 978-1-85375-629-0
  - Collects: "Fight Back to Dunkirk" (#1), "The Crowded Sky" (#56), "Action Stations" (#3), "Umbrella in the Sky" (#54), "Crash Call" (#53), "The Iron Fist" (#25), "Lone Commando" (#36), "The Black Ace" (#141), "Air Commando" (#52), "Fire Power" (#129), "The Red Devils" (#7) and "Task Force" (#66).
- Against All Odds: War Picture Library Collection No. 2, by Steve Holland (ed.) (Carlton Books/Prion, 4 August 2008) ISBN 978-1-85375-661-0
  - Collects: "Finest Hour" (#175), "The Troubled Sea" (#117), "Foxhole Glory" (#170), "The Thin Blue Line" (#96), "Strike Squadron" (#84), "Banzai!" (#80), "Road from Tobruk" (#154), "Up Periscope" (#10), "Rogue Lancaster" (#181), "Paratroop" (#158), "The Valley of Death" (#120) and "Snarl of Battle" (#162).
- Up and at 'em!: War Picture Library Collection No. 3, by Steve Holland (ed.) (Carlton Books/Prion, April 2009) ISBN 978-1-85375-698-6
  - Collects: "Rough Justice" (#214), "Strike Silent" (#218), "The Secret Enemy" (#242), "Counter-Attack" (#283), "Trail of the Avenger" (#229), "Devil's Island" (#227), "The Iron Cross" (#202), "The Long March" (#206), "Operation Doomsday" (#295), "Undaunted" (#292) and "Sound the Alarm" (#212).
- "No Surrender!- Six of the Best Comic-Book adventures from War Picture Library" by Steve Holland (ed.) Prion Books Ltd, April 2010 ISBN 978-1-85375-760-0
  - Collects: "Battle Drop" (#67), "Aces High" (#78), "Up the Marines!" (#58), "Close Range" (#63), "Bombers Moon" (#72) and "Danger Dives Deep" (#65).

== See also ==
- British comics

=== Pocket Libraries ===
- Commando Comics (D. C. Thomson) – published from 1961 to the present.
- Air Ace Picture Library (Amalgamated Press/Fleetway) – aerial-warfare sister-comic, published between Jan 1960 and Nov 1970 (545 issues), and then incorporated into War Picture Library.
- Battle Picture Library (Amalgamated/Fleetway) – published between Jan 1961 and Dec 1984 (1706 issues).
- Combat Picture Library (GM Smith/Micron Press) – published between March 1959 and June 1985 (1212 issues).
  - Combat Library (GM Smith/Micron Press) – text stories only and companion to Combat Picture Library, published between 1959 and 1960 (51 issues)

=== Other British/war comics ===
- Battle Picture Weekly
- Warlord
- Battler Britton, by Garth Ennis
- Charley's War, by Pat Mills
- Adventures in the Rifle Brigade, by Garth Ennis
- War Story, by Garth Ennis
