= Thunderbolt Jaxon =

- Thunderbolt Jaxon on the cover of Knockout Annual 1960.

Publication information
- Publisher: Amalgamated Press; Fleetway Publications; WildStorm
- First appearance: Thunderbolt Jaxon Comics #1 (1949)
- Created by: Jacques Pendower; Hugh McNeill

In-story information
- Alter ego: Jaxon Bedingfield
- Species: Human
- Abilities: Flight; Super-strength; Super-endurance

Thunderbolt Jaxon is a fictional Australian-British Golden Age comic book superhero. He first appeared in Thunderbolt Jaxon Comics #1, published in Australia by Amalgamated Press in 1949. While the character debuted in an Australian comic it was created by British staff working at Amalgamated Press' UK headquarters. The character has since appeared intermittently in British comics, and was revived by Wildstorm in 2006 for a five-issue mini-series written by Dave Gibbons with art by John Higgins.

== Publication history ==
With their Australian wing struggling to keep up with a rash of imported American titles Amalgamated Press editor Edward "Ted" Holmes was instructed to devise strips specially for that market. The result was Thunderbolt Jaxon, devised by the prolific Jacques Pendowner (under his JCH Jacobs pseudonym) and drawn by Hugh McNeill. Holmes later wrote material for the strip himself. Despite the character having the powers of the Norse God Thor, Thunderbolt Jaxon's costume was more ancient Greek in style, with a close-fitting, short-sleeved shirt, short skirt and laced boots.

Adventures of the character appeared in AP's British title The Comet after they purchased it from J.B. Allen and reoriented it to an action comic. Debuting in the 13 August 1949 edition, the Thunderbolt Jaxon strip only lasted a few weeks before being dropped. The Australian series was similarly short-lived, being cancelled after six issues. After a long hiatus, Thunderbolt Jaxon returned in another AP title, Knockout. This time the character's adventures lasted 18 months, from August 1958 to January 1960 (including being the subject of the cover for the 1960 Knockout Annual), with new material including art by Ian Kennedy. A second revival followed in 1964, where the strips were modified slightly and published as Johnny Samson in the pages of Buster until 1965.

In 1989 the character made a guest appearance in Grant Morrison's 2000AD strip Zenith as one of a large number of multiversal superheroes battling the Lloigor. Thunderbolt Jaxon joins a force of superhumans sent to Alternative 257, a parallel Earth. There he is killed by the Lloigor-possessed Wyvern when his belt fails to activate.

The character was one of many Amalgamated Press/Fleetway/IPC characters licensed to DC Comics via WildStorm in 2005; however, Thunderbolt Jaxon did not appear in the Albion mini-series. Instead a reimagining of the hero appeared in a 2006 spin-off mini-series "from the world of Albion", written by Dave Gibbons, who also provided covers for the five issues. Interior art was by John Higgins.

== Character Biography ==
Buckle on this won'rous belt,
Thine is my magic and my power,
Thus speak I, the Mighty Thor,
Thunder Lord of Valhalla's Tower.

— the inscription on the magic belt of Thor.

Orphan Jaxon Bedingfield is under the care of his unpleasant uncle Jasper until his guardian frames him for a crime. He is sent to borstal, where he finds the magic belt of the Norse God Thor. Putting the belt on gives him the powers of Thor himself, transforming him into a large superhuman - as long as he is acting for good. As Thunderbolt Jaxon his first adventure sees Jasper put behind bars. He later tackles saboteurs, kidnappers and prehistoric monsters, among others.

== Powers and abilities ==
When wearing the belt of Thor, Jaxon has incredible strength and endurance, as well as the ability to fly.

== Revival ==
Thunderbolt Jaxon
- The cover to Thunderbolt Jaxon #1.

Publication information
- Publisher: WildStorm
- Schedule: Monthly
- Format: Limited series
- Publication date: April – September 2006
- No. of issues: 5

Creative team
- Written by: Dave Gibbons
- Artist: John Higgins
- Letterer: Todd Klein
- Colorist: Wildstorm FX

Collected editions
- Thunderbolt Jaxon: ISBN 9781401212575

=== Synopsis ===
With the rise of Christianity the powers of the Pagan Norse Gods of Asgard are waning. Unable to overcome the Christian host they strike a deal that sees the Aesir and the giants of Jotunheimen renounce their godhood and objects of power. However Odin's son Thor eschews the deal and walks away from immortality.

1500 years later local teenagers Jaxon, Billy and Saff are out treasure hunting at Vigrid Cove when they find Viking artefacts - a belt, a necklace in the shape of a cross and a torc. After returning by bus they split the items between them. Jaxon is attacked by his vicious stepfather Larry, who then joins up with local gangster O'Dunne and his men, who violently thwart a drug deal being struck by the rival gang ran by Garrod. Jaxon meanwhile puts on the belt and is transformed into a musclebound adult. The following morning Jaxon awakens to the sound of Larry beating his mother. He hits Larry with the belt - unmasking him as the Aesir Loki. Jaxon gets his mother clear and drops her off with relatives before heading to Saff's house, while Larry tricks his way into Billy's home and tries to take the torc. Jaxon again puts on the belt and becomes Thor but struggles to maintain control, allowing Larry to kidnap Saff. She is taken to O'Dunne's Rainbow Club, and he tells her of his history as Odin. Before Larry can start beating her for information Garrod's men firebomb the club in retribution.

Jaxon once again assumes the role of Thor, with Billy helping him to maintain control long enough to get Saff to safety. He returns to normal but the trio are captured by Garrod. They then realise the necklace taken by Saff is actually the hammer Mjollnir, and Jaxon breaks free as Thor just as O'Dunn's gang arrives at Garrod's hideout. With Jaxon back to normal the trio get the bus to Vigrid Cove, planning to rebury the objects. They are pursued by both gangs, who have dropped the pretence and are now openly the Aesir and the giants. Even though O'Dunne and Larry ram the bus they make it there. The battle spreads to consecrated ground and an angel appears, unleashing the Midgard Serpent and triggering Ragnarok. The Aesir and the giants are all wiped out apart from Thor. Billy pleads for Jaxon's life and the angel relents, instead simply removing Thor's personality. This leaves Jaxon as a mortal but in full control in either form. He rights the bus and Billy comes up with the name Thunderbolt Jaxon for their friend.
