= Sep E. Scott =

English painter

- Born: Septimus Edwin Scott; 19 March 1879 Sunderland, Tyne and Wear, England
- Died: 1965 (aged 85–86)
- Area: Artist

Septimus Edwin Scott (1879–1965), who signed his name Sep E. Scott, was a British painter, illustrator and comics artist.

== Biography ==
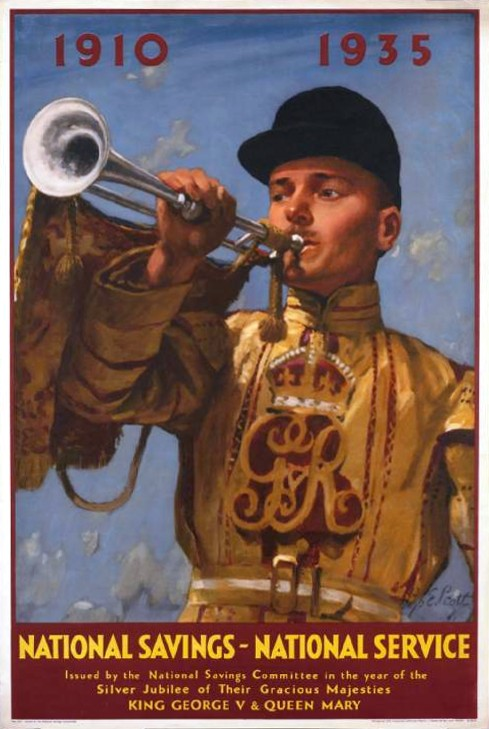
1910 - 1935 - National Savings - National Service, (1935)

Scott was born in Sunderland, Tyne and Wear, England, on 19 March 1879, and studied at the Royal College of Art in London. By 1903 he was exhibiting his landscape and portrait paintings at the Royal Academy. He was elected an associate of the Royal Society of British Artists in 1919, the Royal Institute of Oil Painters in 1920 and Royal Institute of Painters in Water Colours in 1927.

As an illustrator, Scott contributed to periodicals including The Graphic and The Red Magazine, painted colour plates for editions of Charles Dickens' A Tale of Two Cities and R. M. Ballantyne's The Coral Island, and illustrated a number of Ladybird Books. He also illustrated the book An Incurable Disease written under the pseudonym Roland Dunster by Lord Stevenson.

During the First World War he painted propaganda posters for the Ministry of Munitions, and from the 1920s he worked in advertising, painting posters for Lifebuoy soap, Mars chocolate bars and Players cigarettes, among many other products. His art was probably most widely known through railway company posters such as one for the London & North Eastern Railway to advertise rail services to Newcastle's North East Coast Exhibition, which was open from May to October 1929.

In 1948 he was recruited by Amalgamated Press comics editor Leonard Matthews to draw historical adventure comic strips. He illustrated the pirate series Captain Flame for Knockout from 1948 to 1953, and The King's Captain for Comet from 1951 to 1952, both strips written by Matthews. He drew five issues of Thriller Comics Library, which also reprinted his Captain Flame and King's Captain serials, and painted 108 covers for the title, and several for Cowboy Comics Library, War Picture Library, and Swift. He also drew strips for the nursery titles Playhour and Jack and Jill, and contributed illustrations to the educational magazine Look and Learn. He worked in comics until shortly before his death in 1965.
