= The Gay Cavalier (TV series) =

1957 British television adventure series

- Created by: Brock Williams; Jack Andrews
- Starring: Christian Marquand
- Country of origin: United Kingdom
- No. of series: 1
- No. of episodes: 13 (all missing)

Production
- Running time: 30 minutes
- Production company: Associated-Rediffusion

Original release
- Network: ITV
- Release: 12 July – 4 October 1957

The Gay Cavalier is a 1957 British television adventure series set during the English Civil War and starring Christian Marquand as a fictionalised Captain Claude Duval. The series was made by Associated Rediffusion and shown on ITV between May and August 1957.

== Plot ==
In truth, Duval was a successful gentleman highwayman who came from France to post-Restoration England, but The Gay Cavalier portrayed him in heroic fashion. In each of the series 13 episodes, Duval was to be seen embarking on an adventure which required him to undertake such tasks as treasure hunting, thwarting a plot by the Roundheads or saving a damsel in distress. Each of the adventures was self-contained and Duval was often accompanied on these exploits by a female companion (usually a different one in each episode).

== Cast ==
The series also featured a number of other actors who generally appeared in one of the adventures. These included Christopher Lee, John Le Mesurier, Conrad Phillips, Nigel Stock and Sam Kydd.

== Similarities to other historical fiction series ==
The series was similar in genre to others of the time, such as The Adventures of Robin Hood, and though it was shot on film, it is unique in that not one of its episodes has survived.
