= Geoff Campion =

British cartoonist

- Born: Arthur Geoffrey Campion; 19 November 1916; Coventry, Warwickshire, England
- Died: 18 December 1997 (aged 81); Axbridge, Somerset, England
- Occupation: Artist
- Known for: Adventure strips

Cover of Battle Picture Weekly, featuring D-Day Dawson, 1975

Arthur Geoffrey Campion (19 November 1916 – 18 December 1997) was a British comics artist who drew adventure strips for Amalgamated Press/IPC.

He started out as a tax inspector. As a staff officer in the British Indian Army in World War II he began drawing cartoons for the forces' magazine, Jambo. Returning to England, he responded to an ad from the Amalgamated Press looking for artists in 1948. He was hired by editor Leonard Matthews to draw humour strips like Professor Bloop in Knock-Out, and filled in on a variety of strips for AP artist Hugh McNeill, including a Thunderbolt Jaxon comic for publication in Australia in 1949.

Matthews then recruited him to draw westerns for Cowboy Comics Library — when Campion protested he couldn't draw horses, Matthews replied, "Bloody well learn then!" He established himself as one of AP/Fleetway's leading adventure artists, working for titles like The Comet and Sun as well as Knock-Out. Aside from westerns, like Strongbow the Mohawk, Buffalo Bill and Billy the Kid, he drew WWII aviation strip Battler Britton, historical strips like Dick Turpin, a highwaywoman strip, Black Velvet, for Poppet, and adaptations of Quo Vadis and Last of the Mohicans. He also drew Tales of the Gold Monkey and The Cyclone King for TV Comic, and for Eagle, Playhour and Look and Learn.

Over the course of the 1950s and 60s his style became the house style for AP/Fleetway adventure artists. In the 1960s he worked for Lion, drawing Captain Condor, Typhoon Tracy and The Spellbinder, and Valiant, drawing Captain Hurricane. In the 1970s he worked for Battle Picture Weekly, drawing D-Day Dawson, The Eagle, Fighter from the Sky, Sergeant Without Stripes and Action Force.

In 1988, he drew large tableau boards for the National Trust, illustrating the history of The Needles old Battery on the Isle of Wight, which remain on display there.
