= Reg Bunn =

British comic book artist

- Born: Reginald Bunn c. 1905 UK
- Died: 1971 (aged 65–66) UK
- Area: Artist
- Notable works: The Spider

Reginald Bunn (c. 1905–died 1971) was a British comic book artist, best known for his work on The Spider in Lion, and work in other British comics during the 1960s.

As a young man, Bunn produced commissioned portraits and caricatures to supplement his income. He spent the war years in Liverpool, suffering a serious motor accident there in 1944 which rendered him paralysed from the neck down. He was told he would never walk again but with considerable effort he recovered, although he would suffer back problems for the rest of his life.

After the war he worked as a draughtsman at Rolls-Royce in Derby. In 1949 Amalgamated Press launched a nationwide search for artists for their publications. Bunn was a joint winner and would go on to draw for The Comet (Buck Jones and Robin Hood), Sun (Clip McCord), Thriller Comics and, most notably, Lion, for which he co-created The Spider with writer Ted Cowan. His work was noted for its highly detailed and angular qualities.

Bunn married and had three children — two sons and a daughter. He spent more than 20 years working from a studio in his home and died in 1971 at the age of sixty-six.
