= Wild West Weekly =

U.S. periodical

Wild West Weekly was a dime novel later turned pulp magazine.

On October 24, 1902 Frank Tousey released his first issue of the 5-cent dime novel Wild West Weekly called "The Prince in the Saddle". Written by Frank, though said to be written by "An Old Scout", it created a story centered around the character Young Wild West, a "bright, handsome boy of eighteen with a wealth of waving chestnut hair hanging down his back". West is an expert horse rider among other things.

The dime novel series ran from 1902 to 1928. In 1927, the novel was acquired by Street & Smith and continued to run as a pulp magazine from 1931 to 1943. In 1943 the magazine went through a name change, removing the word weekly from its title and was discontinued by the company later that year. Wild West ran for a total of 822 issues before ceasing publication.

Regular writers included editor Tousey, Cornelius Shea, J. Allan Dunn, Wayne D. Overholser, Walker A. Tompkins, and Allan Vaughan Elston. Wild West Weekly had covers drawn by several artists who worked for Street & Smith, including Walter M. Baumhofer and Norman Saunders.

The magazine was featured in an exhibition about Native American portrayals by the University of California Bancroft Library.
