= Battler Britton =

Publication information
- Publisher: Amalgamated Press/Fleetway Publications; DC/WildStorm
- First appearance: Sun #362 (14 January 1956)
- Created by: Mike Butterworth and Geoff Campion

In-story information
- Alter ego: Robert Hereward "Battler" Britton
- Species: Human
- Team affiliations: Royal Air Force
- Abilities: Flying ace

Battler Britton is a British comics character created by Mike Butterworth and Geoff Campion. He first appeared in Amalgamated Press' Sun in 1956, and later featured in Knockout, and the long-running digest titles Thriller Picture Library, Air Ace Picture Library, and War Picture Library.

Wing Commander Robert Hereward "Battler" Britton is a former member of the French Foreign Legion and served as a Lieutenant-Commander while attached to the Peruvian Navy. He was one of the Royal Air Force's top pilots during World War II, proficient on both Supermarine Spitfires and Hawker Hurricanes.

== Publication history ==
=== Original run ===
Battler Britton first appeared in Amalgamated Press' Sun #362 (14 January 1956) (Sun was acquired by AP from rival publisher J. B. Allen). Mike Butterworth wrote early episodes of Battler Britton, which were illustrated by Geoff Campion; later artwork was provided by Gianluigi Coppola, Hugo Pratt, Francisco Solano López, Ian Kennedy, Pat Nicolle, and Graham Coton.

Battler Britton became the Sun cover feature with issue #490 (28 June 1958), and from April to September 1959 the publication carried the tagline Battler Britton's Own Weekly. Sun merged with Lion in 1959, as Amalgamated Press was acquired by what became IPC/Fleetway. After appearing in Sun, Battler Britton was featured on the cover of Fleetway's Knockout in 1960–1961. The Battler Britton strip was later a mainstay of Thriller Picture Library, Air Ace Picture Library, and War Picture Library. He later appeared in The Champion, Valiant, and a couple of Valiant annuals, and the Battler Britton Picture Library Holiday Special, published annually from 1977 to 1984.

=== 2006 revival ===
After a series of acquisitions, Time Warner became the license holder of Battler Britain (along with a whole stable of IPC characters, including Captain Hurricane, Robot Archie, The Steel Claw and The Spider, as well as minor characters like Fishboy and Faceache). In the summer of 2004, DC Comics acquired the license.

Comics writer (and World War II enthusiast) Garth Ennis revived Battler Britain in 2006 in Battler Britton: Bloody Good Show, a five-part series published by DC Comics/WildStorm with art by Colin Wilson. Covers were by Garry Leach. The series featured the ace fighter pilot commanding a squadron of Bristol Beaufighters in North Africa during the Second World War. A trade paperback was released in 2007 (ISBN 1-4012-1378-2), which contained some additional information on the original character.

=== Current licensee ===
In August 2016, Rebellion Developments acquired the Fleetway library from Egmont Group, making it the owner of all comics characters and titles created by IPC's subsidiaries after 1 January 1970, together with 26 specified characters who appeared in Buster and Roy of the Rovers; while IPC currently retains its other comics characters and titles, including Sexton Blake, The Steel Claw, and Battler Britton (but not Dan Dare, which was sold separately and is now owned by the Dan Dare Corporation).
