= D. C. Eyles =

British illustrator and comics artist (1902–1974)

"A Tale of Hereward the Wake", from the Knockout Fun Book, 1950

Derek Charles Eyles (1902–1974) was a British illustrator and comics artist. Born in North Finchley, London, he was the son of Charles Eyles, a painter and illustrator who had worked with the Impressionists in France, and had a brother, Geoffrey Eyles, an illustrator who appears to have died young.

Eyles' colour plates and black and white illustrations began appearing in boys' annuals in the 1920s and 1930s. He painted covers and drew interior illustrations for story papers like Wild West Weekly. He also illustrated novels, including an edition of Jack London's White Fang, and children's books, including an edition of Charles and Mary Lamb's Tales from Shakespeare, and in the 1930s and 1940s, painted a series of covers for Collins' western novels. Two fictitious portraits in a fake memoir are signed "D. C. Eyles 41".

After the Second World War he was hired by Amalgamated Press editor Leonard Matthews to draw adventure strips for the publisher's comics, beginning with "The Phantom Sheriff" in The Knockout in 1947, a character whose prose adventures he had previously illustrated in Wild West Weekly. Other titles he contributed to included The Comet, Thriller Picture Library, Cowboy Comics Library, Sun, Radio Fun, Adventures, and Swift. He excelled at drawing horses, which made him particularly suitable for western characters, including Wild Bill Hickok, Kit Carson and Buffalo Bill, as well other historical characters like Hereward the Wake, Robin Hood and Dick Turpin, and new artists were given samples of his work as examples of how to "do horses properly".

In the 1960s he worked mainly in the nursery end of the comics market, on titles like Treasure and TV Toyland, and for girls' titles like Tina and Princess Tina. By the 1970s westerns and other equestrian genres had fallen out of fashion, and Eyles struggled to get work. Suffering from diabetes, he died in December 1974 after an unsuccessful operation.
