= Frank Minnitt =

- Born: Frank John Minnitt; 3 September 1894; Southgate, London
- Died: 12 May 1958 (aged 63)
- Occupations: illustrator, cartoonist
- Years active: 1920s–1950s
- Known for: comic papers (1920s1950s)
- Notable work: Knockout comic
- Spouse(s): Alice Davie (m.1919); Evelynne Thelma Snell (m.1947)
- Children: 2: daughter, son

Frank John Minnitt (3 September 1894 – 12 May 1958) was a British illustrator and cartoonist who drew for over 100 comic magazines from the 1920s to the 1950s. He is perhaps best known for his depictions of Billy Bunter in the comic Knockout between 1939 and 1958.

Minnitt was born in Southgate in London in 1894, the youngest of five sons of Mary Ann Smith (1854-1943) and William Robinson Minnitt (1858-1927). Educated at the Hugh Myddleton School in Islington, aged 14 he was the London Junior Boxing Champion; later, he followed his father into working for the General Post Office (GPO) before serving with the Coldstream Guards during World War I. He was sent to France where he suffered injuries from mustard gas which affected him for the rest of his life. After the war Minnitt returned to the General Post Office, later working as a welder with a taxi firm before becoming an artist. A completely self-taught cartoonist, around 1920 Minnitt began to contribute single joke cartoons to the comics of the Amalgamated Press (AP). Subsequently, his work appeared in various titles including Comic Life, Joker, Merry & Bright, Butterfly, Jolly and Sparkler.

From 1936 he began to submit work to D.C. Thomson and his drawings appeared in the Fun Section of The Sunday Post and The Dandy. He took over drawing Billy Bunter’s picture strip from C. H. Chapman in Amalgamated Press’s Knockout comic in 1939, drawing the popular character in a round-style. Minnitt drew a beaming and bouncy Bunter, which at first followed Chapman's style, then later branched into a style of his own, concentrating on slapstick humour. By 1942 the Famous Five had vanished from the strip, replaced by Jones Minor, who had all the good qualities Bunter lacked, but who was prone to being led astray by Bunter. The form-master, Mr Quelch, stayed (at least in name), but he lost his dignity and aloofness. It was an entirely different Greyfriars School from that described by Charles Hamilton in The Magnet but it became immediately popular, with Minnitt continuing to draw Bunter until shortly before he died in 1958. In the mid to late 1940s his work appeared in a number of different short-run titles issued by small publishers; these included Comicolour, Jingo, Swell Comic, Big Laugh, and various others. During World War II he lived in Leigh-on-Sea in Essex.

He married Alice Davie in 1919, and had a daughter Betty (1920–2009). He married Evelynne Thelma Snell (1912–2003) in 1947 and with her had a son, John Frank Minnitt (born 1950).

On his death the drawing of Billy Bunter in Knockout was taken over by artists Eric Roberts and Reg Parlett.

== Sources ==
- Frank Minnitt by Alan Clark (Golden Fun, Summer 1986)
- Knockout Comic: An Illustrated Guide by David Ashford, John Allen-Clarke & Steve Holland (CJ Publications, 1997)
