= Eric Parker (illustrator) =

British illustrator and comics artist (1898–1974)

- Born: Eric Robert Parker; 7 September 1898; Stoke Newington, London, England
- Died: 21 March 1974 (aged 75); Edgware, London
- Education: Central School of Arts and Crafts
- Known for: Illustration, comics

Union Jack #1105, cover illustration of Sexton Blake by Eric Parker, 1924

Eric Robert Parker (7 September 1898 – 21 March 1974) was a prolific British illustrator and comics artist best known for illustrating the adventures of Sexton Blake in various periodicals.

Born at Stoke Newington, North London, on 7 September 1898, he was awarded a special scholarship to the Central School of Arts and Crafts at the age of 15. A photo of him appeared in the Boy's Own Paper celebrating his achievement.

During the First World War he served with the Royal Buckinghamshire Hussars and in military intelligence MI 7b alongside Captain Bruce Bairnsfather, producing propaganda directed at the Home Front - See "MI 7b - the discovery of a lost propaganda archive from the Great War". After the war he became a freelance illustrator, contributing to periodicals including The Strand Magazine. He joined the Amalgamated Press as a staff artist in 1922, where Harold Twyman, editor of the story paper Union Jack, was looking to give detective character Sexton Blake a new direction and a more identifiable look. Parker drew him as a tall, lean pipe-smoker with receding hair, an interpretation that became definitive. Throughout the 1930s he illustrated Blake's adventures in Union Jack (until it closed in 1933), Detective Weekly (from 1933 on) and the Sexton Blake Library, for which he painted all the covers until 1953, and continued illustrating the character until 1955 when a new editor decided on another revamp. At the same time, he was providing illustrations for Chums, The Strand Magazine, Pearson's, The Scout, The Wide World Magazine, Wild West Weekly and others.

In 1939 AP launched a new comic, Knockout, for which Parker initially supplied spot illustrations for prose stories, later also drawing comic strips, mostly historical adventures, including westerns starring Buffalo Bill and Kit Carson, and adaptations of classic novels like Kidnapped and The Children of the New Forest and the 1947 Douglas Fairbanks, Jr. film The Exile. Although Knockout featured Sexton Blake in comic strip adventures, it was only in 1949 that Parker drew a Sexton Blake comic strip serial, "The Secret of Monte Cristo". The same year he illustrated the prose adventures of Beau Brummell, who writer Frank S. Pepper imagined living a double life as a highwayman. After 1949 he also worked for two new AP comics, Sun and Comet, drawing "The Happy Hussar", set during the Napoleonic Wars, for the former, and "Nelson", a biographical strip of the Naval hero, and the adventures of highwayman Claude Duval, for the latter. During the 1950s he drew more westerns and historical adventures for Cowboy Comics Library and Thriller Comics, and in the early 1960s he drew "The Three Rollicking Rogues" for Buster.

In the late 1940s and 50s he also drew five newspaper strips: "Pepys' Diary" for The Evening News, "Making a Film" and "Paula" for the Daily Express, Elizabethan strip "An Age of Greatness" for the Daily Globe, and "Our Gang" for The Sunday Pictorial. He also drew "Tommy Walls", a series of adverts in comic strip form for Wall's ice cream in the Eagle, full colour political advertisements for the Conservative Party, and illustrations and covers for The Soldier, official magazine of the British Army.

In 1960 Parker was appointed art director for educational magazine Look and Learn, which involved laying out comic strips for other artists to draw. He also contributed to Ranger, including a full colour feature called "Scrapbook of the British Soldier", which he wrote as well as illustrated based on his knowledge of military history, beginning in 1966. The "Scrapbook" moved to Look and Learn when Ranger merged into it, and was followed by "Scrapbook of the British Sailor", and "For Valour", on the history of medals. When he died on 21 March 1974 he was working on a new series, "A Thousand Years of Spying".
