= Arthur Catherall =

English author (1906–1980)

- Born: 6 February 1906; Bolton, England
- Died: 6 January 1980 (aged 73)
- Occupation: Author
- Writing career
- Genre: Children's literature

Arthur Catherall (1906–1980) was an English author, mostly of works for children.

Catherall was born in Bolton, England. During the Second World War he served with the RAF in Burma and East Bengal. He also travelled widely in Europe, Africa and the Far East. A keen sailor, he also made several voyages in British trawlers to the fishing grounds off the coast of Iceland.

His writing career was diverse and prolific, writing under his own name and also at least seven pseudonyms, including A. R. Channel; Dan Corby; J. Baltimore; Linda Peters; Peter Hallard; Trevor Maine and Margaret Ruthin. He wrote magazine short stories, single novels and series novels for all age groups and genders. By 1973 his U.K. publishers, J.M. Dent and Sons, claimed that sales of his books exceeded one million copies

== Bibliography ==
- Camp Fire Stories 1935.
- The Rival Tugboats 1937.
- Black Gold 1938.
- Adventurers, Ltd 1938.
- Raid on Heligoland 1940.
- Keepers of the Khyber 1940.
- The Flying Submarine 1945.
- The Bull Patrol 1949.
- Riders of the Black Camel 1949.
- Cock o' the Town 1950.
- Lost with All Hands 1950.
- Tomorrow's Hunter 1950.
- Pirate Sealer 1951.
- The River of Burning Sand 1947.
- Vanished Whaler 1939.
- The Scout Story Omnibus 1954.
- Vibrant Brass 1954.
- The Scuttlers 1955.
- Sea Wraith 1955.
- Wild Goose Saboteur 1955.
- Land Under the White Robe 1956.
- Jamboree Challenge 1957.
- Jungle Trap 1958.
- Tenderfoot Trapper 1959.
- Lapland Outlaw 1960.
- The Arctic Sealer 1961.
- The Young Baden-Powell 1961
- Vagabond Ape 1962.
- Orphan Otter 1963.
- Lone Seal Pup 1964.
- The Strange Invader 1964.
- Thunder Dam 1965
- Yugoslav Mystery 1965.
- Shanghaied! 1966.
- A Zebra Came to Drink 1967.
- Prisoners in the Jungle 1967.
- Prisoners in the snow 1967.
- Sicilian Mystery 1967.
- Camel Caravan 1968.
- The Night of the Black Frost 1968.
- Barracuda Mystery 1969.
- Duel in the High Hills 1969.
- Red Sea Rescue 1969.
- Kidnapped by Accident 1969.
- The Big Tusker 1970.
- Antlers of the King Moose 1970
- The Unwilling Smuggler 1971.
- Freedom for a Cheetah 1971: A young tame cheetah is let loose from her home in an Indian aristocrat's stables and faces the dangers and joys of life in the jungle.
- The Last Horse on the Sands 1972.
- Vanishing Lapland 1972.
- The Cave of the Cormorant 1973.
- A Wolf from the Sky 1974.
- Stranger on Wreck Buoy Sands 1975.
- The Last Run and Other Stories 1977.
- Twelve Minutes to Disaster and Other Stories 1977.
- Thirteen Footprints and Other Stories 1979.
- Keepers of the Cattle 1979.
- Smuggler in the Bay 1980.
- The "Bulldog" books.

1.Ten Fathoms Deep 1954.
2. Jackals of the Sea 1955.
3. Forgotten Submarine 1956.
4. Java Sea Duel 1957.
5. Sea Wolves 1959 .
6. Dangerous Cargo 1960.
7. China Sea Jigsaw 1962.
8. Prisoners Under the Sea 1963.
9. Tanker Trap 1965.
10. Death of an Oil Rig 1967.
11. Island of Forgotten Men 1968.

As A R Channel:

- Phantom Patrol 1940: five boy scouts -an English boy, two Finns and two Lapps - in Petsamo, Finland, are caught behind enemy lines when Stalin invades Finland in the 1939 Winter War. Dedicated to "the Boy Scouts of Finland, who gave service and sacrifice without stint in defence of their country".
- The Fighting Four 1958.
- Operation V.2. 1960.
- The Tunnel Busters 1960.
- Million Dollar ice floe 1961.
- Arctic Spy 1962.
- The Rogue Elephant 1962.
- Mission Accomplished 1964.
- Red Ivory 1964.
- Jungle Rescue 1968.

The Forgotten Patrol – A “Fighting Four” Adventure (?)

As Dan Corby:

- The Little Sealer 1960.
- Lost Off the Grand Banks 1961.
- Man-Eater 1963.
- Thunder Dam 1964.
- Conqueror's Gold 1965.

As Peter Hallard:

- Barrier Reef Bandits 1960.
- Guardian of the Reef 1961.
- Coral Reef Castaway 1968.
- The White Giraffe 1969.
- Desert Caravan 1969.
- Puppy Lost in Lapland 1971.
- Kalu and the Wild Boar 1973.

As Margaret Ruthin:

- The Secret Pagoda 1950.
- Kidnapped in Kandy 1951.
- The Ring of the Prophet 1953.
- The White Horse of Hungary 1954.
- Strange Safari 1955.
- Jungle Nurse 1960.
- Elle of the Northland 1961.
- Reindeer Girl 1961.
- Lapland Nurse 1962.
- Secret of the Shetlands 1963.
- Katrina of the Lonely Isles 1964.
- Kidnapped in Stromboli 1966.
- Jungle Gypsy 1968.
- Hungarian Rebel 1970.

As Trevor Maine:

- Blue Veil and Black Gold 1961.

As Linda Peters:

- Adventures at Brackendale 1960.
