= Sun (comics) =

British former weekly comic

- The cover to the 22 March 1958 edition of Sun Weekly, featuring Battler Britton

Publication information
- Publisher: J. B. Allen (November 1947 – May 1949); Amalgamated Press (May 1949 – October 1959)
- Schedule: Fortnightly (11 November 1947 to 6 May 1950); Weekly (20 May 1950 to 17 October 1959)
- Format: Ongoing series
- Genre: Action/adventureHumor/comedy
- Publication date: 11 November 1947 – 17 October 1959
- No. of issues: 551
- Main characters: Battler Britton; Billy the Kid; Dick Turpin; Max Bravo; Robin Hood

Creative team
- Written by: Mike Butterworth; Joan Whitford
- Artist(s): Reg Bunn; Geoff Campion; Hugh McNeill; Patrick Nicolle
- Editor(s): Leonard Matthews; Len Wenn

Sun was a weekly British comics periodical published by J. B. Allen, Amalgamated Press and Fleetway Publications between 11 November 1947 and 17 October 1959. During this time it was also known as Sun Comic, Sun Adventure Weekly, The Cowboy Sun Weekly, The Cowboy Sun, The Sun and Sun Weekly at various points, and ran for 551 issues before merging with Lion.

While predominantly featuring Westerns and other historical adventure stories, the title's best-remembered character would be the World War II fighter pilot Battler Britton, who first appeared in 1956 and foreshadowed the popularity of war comics in Britain through the 1960s and 1970s.

== Creation ==
Sale-based publisher J.B. Allen had launched the first new post-war British comic - The Comet - in 1946. It had quickly become a success and the company looked to add a companion title. However post-war rationing and austerity meant permission to create new titles was difficult to obtain. Instead, Allen decided to repurpose health magazine Fitness and Sun, turning it into an 8-page fortnightly comic.

== Publication history ==
=== J. B. Allen ===
The first edition of the comic was dated 11 November 1947 and led with a text comic adaptation of The Swiss Family Robinson drawn by Bob Wilkin and a similarly formatted telling of Robin Hood in Reg Beaumont's "Sherwood Outlaw". There were also a trio of text stories - "The Cruise of the Cormorant", "Susan Storm - Girl Reporter" and "The Coffin Ship", as well as humour cartoons "Kindheart", "Old Buck and Texas Tich" and "Fuzzy".

The title was a success, and the Christmas edition on 23 December saw the front page given over to a retelling of "Good King Wenceslas". Since the change, the 'Fitness and...' had been rendered on the cover in a tiny font, and as of 6 January 1948 disappeared entirely. Further adventure serials followed with the escapades of teenage siblings John and Joan Randall, and espionage thriller "Formula X".

=== Amalgamated Press ===
In 1949 J. B. Allen were taken over by London giant Amalgamated Press, with Sun and Comet both continuing under the new owners, both transitioning to becoming weekly comics. Leonard Matthews, one of the driving forces behind AP's successful Knockout comic, was assigned as editor from the 24 May edition. Initially the change of Sun's contents was slow, though text comics were phased out in favour of picture strips, but on 1 October the comic changed to photogravure printing, introducing two new comic serials - Westerns "Sitting Bull" (initially an imported French strip originally printed in Coq Hardi) and "Deadshot Sue". The latter was drawn by Hugh McNeill, recruited from DC Thomson in 1939 to launch Knockout, who would be prolific contributor to Sun on both humour and adventure features.

December would see a picture strip retelling RKO's Mighty Joe Young, the first of a large number of film adaptations. Typically these were based on recent hit adventure movies, and the Sun versions used a number of formats - picture strips with likenesses of the cast drawn by McNeill or Robert MacGillivray; prose pieces illustrated with stills and on one occasion - for Western South of St. Louis - as a photo strip.

Amalgamated Press mounted a nationwide talent search in 1949, unearthing Reg Bunn and Geoff Campion. The following year saw the debut of Bunn-drawn adventure serial "Clip McCord", following the eponymous reporter turned special agent. 1951 saw popular new adventures of highwayman Duck Turpin in "Highway Days" and Campion's take on celebrity cowboy actor Buck Jones. The former invented a female companion for Turpin in the form of highwaywoman Moll Moonlight; when some Turpin strips were modified to form the early adventures of Jack o' Justice in Valiant, her character was retained unchanged, making Moll one of the few prominent female characters in boys' comics of the time.

Under AP, Sun and Comet were treated as sister titles under the 'Happy Comics' banner, and frequently advertised each other. In March 1952 the pages of both were halved in size and the comic was expanded to 20 pages. This allowed space for new picture stories "Jak of the Jaguars" and "Sinbad Sails Again". Six months after the reformat, one of Sun's longest-running stories joined the line-up. "Billy the Kid" was a highly romantic and historically inaccurate take on William Boney, featuring the outlaw attempting to hang up his guns, only to constantly have to fight once more as a long string of villains passed by. The setup featured Billy using a dual identity; realising this would take up a lot of each weekly episode, Matthews ordered it extended to a then-unheard of six pages instead of the two or three pages usually used at the time for a British weekly story. Campion would be the primary artist, though the demanding schedule meant many others filled in. The result was hugely popular with readers, and the format was copied by Comet for lead feature "Strongbow the Mohawk" and later "Buffalo Bill".

Later in the year Robin Hood also appeared in new strips, written by Mike Butterworth and later 'Barry Ford' - the pseudonym of Joan Whitford, who chose to hide her gender due to the growing audience segregation of British comics. Ironically, 'Ford' was one of the title's most popular writers, particularly of Westerns, and also provided popular factual feature "Barry Ford's Western Scrapbook". Other genres were catered for by the likes of "Max Bravo - The Happy Hussar" and "Jeremy Blaze the Boy Buccaneer".

7 January 1956 saw the debut of Battler Britton, a World War II fighter ace. At the time the conflict had rarely been a subject of British comics, which had largely served as an escape for children. Devised by Mike Butterworth and initially drawn by Campion, Battler's swift success with readers suggested it was no longer a traumatic subject. A growing number of war stories would appear in AP and DC Thomson boys' comics going forward.

Another new addition was Tom Merry, who provided Billy Bunter-esque boarding school japes, both by himself and as part of the Terrible Three. Like Bunter - who was enjoying a popular revival in Knockout - he was an old character from boys' story papers, having debuted in The Gem in 1907. For the time being Westerns were still the biggest draw however, to the extent that for a time in 1957 the comic was renamed the Sun Cowboy Adventure Weekly, and began featuring a Roy Rogers strip.

Accordingly, as Westerns fell in popularity at the end of the fifties Sun's sales suffered, and Len Wenn took over as editor from Matthews. The title's name was changed to The Sun and then Sun Weekly; the photogravure paper disappeared in favour of cheaper newsprint while an attempt at modernising was undertaken with the likes of "The Martian" (based on Edgar Rice Burroughs' A Princess of Mars) and Battler Britton being moved to the front page. A slew of reprints from Picture Library titles failed to halt the slide, and shortly after Amalgamated Press were purchased by the Mirror Group and reorganised into Fleetway Publications both Sun and Comet would be cancelled.

While Comet was incorporated into Tiger, Sun was merged with Lion from 24 October 1959; the name Lion and Sun would remain in place until 26 March 1950. Only "Billy the Kid" would continue in the combined title.

Since 2018 the rights to the material originated for Sun have been owned by Rebellion Developments..

== Titles ==
- Fitness and Sun - 11 November to 23 December 1947
- Sun - 6 January 1948 to 4 November 1950
- Sun Comic - 11 November 1950 to 22 March 1952
- Sun - 29 March 1952 to 11 August 1956
- Sun Adventure Weekly - 18 August 1956 to 6 April 1957
- The Cowboy Sun Weekly - 13 April to 30 June 1957
- The Cowboy Sun - 6 July to 13 July 1957
- The Sun - 20 July to 17 August 1957
- Sun Weekly - 24 August 1957 to 17 October 1959
