= The Comet (British comics) =

British weekly comic

- The cover of Comet from 6 December 1952, art by Reg Parlett.

Publication information
- Publisher: J.B. Allen (1946 to 1949); Amalgamated Press (1949 to 1959); Fleetway Publications (1959)
- Schedule: Weekly
- Format: Ongoing series
- Publication date: 20 September 1946 – 17 October 1959
- No. of issues: 580

Creative team
- Written by: Mike Butterworth; Edward Holmes; Leonard Matthews
- Artist(s): Reg Bunn; Geoff Campion; Derek Eyles; Philip Mendoza; Patrick Nicolle; Reg Parlett; Sep E. Scott
- Editor(s): Edward Holmes; Alfred Wallace

The Comet was a weekly British comics periodical published by J.B. Allen and later Amalgamated Press and Fleetway Publications from 20 September 1946 to 17 October 1959. Initially a children's newspaper, The Comet was transformed into a boys' adventure comic in May 1949 by editor Edward Holmes when J.B. Allen were purchased by Amalgamated Press. Also known as Comet Comic, The Comet Adventure Weekly, Comet Weekly and simply Comet as various points the title continued until October 1959, reaching 580 issues before being merged with another AP boys' comic, Tiger.

== Creation ==
After the end of World War II, Sale, Greater Manchester publisher J.B. Allen opted to take advantage of the conflict's impact on story papers and comics. Paper rationing had seen many established pre-war titles fold or merge with other publications, while children's literature had naturally been low priority as cargo on Atlantic convoys, ending importation of American comic books. As such, there were gaps in the post-war market. Launched on 20 September 1946, The Comet was the first new British comic launched since before the war, and consisted of eight 9.5 inch by 12.25 inch pages, some enhancing the black-and-white with red ink, and was priced at 2d. The fortnightly paper was a mix of picture strips (initially adventure story "Round the World in the Flying Fish" and literary adaptation "Treasure Island"), illustrated prose stories and comedic cartoons.

== Publishing history ==
The paper was a success, and a third picture strip - new cover feature "Jungle Lord" - was added in February 1947, which saw the title convert to two-tone glossy photogravure. In October 1947, The Comet was joined by companion publication Sun (an overhauled relaunch of bi-weekly health magazine Fitness and Sun).

In May 1949, the large London-based Amalgamated Press bought out J.B. Allen. The new owners assigned two of their most successful editors, Edward Holmes and Leonard Matthews, to revamp The Comet and Sun respectively into weekly comics. Before the war, Holmes had been the driving force in setting up AP's Dandy/Beano competitor Knockout. Following wartime service, Holmes - a strong advocate of picture strips as the future of comics - had been assigned to develop a line of American-style comic books for AP's division in Australia and New Zealand. He experienced particular success with Western characters Kit Carson (based on the real-life frontiersman) and Buck Jones (based on a fictionalised version of the film star), while also instigating the creation of early British superhero Thunderbolt Jaxon. Based on this experience, Holmes decided to reinvent The Comet as a through-and-through boys' adventure title, phasing out the humour cartoons, though briefly featuring the female-led "June" - a young, innocent but equally disaster-prone version of Norman Pett's newspaper pin-up icon Jane. Buck Jones and Thunderbolt Jaxon were chosen to spearhead the newly rebranded Comet Comic, initially using the extant art. The comic also emphasised its link with Sun - both titles were marketed as companions under the "Happy Comics" banner, and frequently advertised each other.

To fill these new pages Holmes and Matthews instigated a nationwide search for artistic talent. While this endeavour only uncovered two new artists it delivered on quality as both Reg Bunn and Geoff Campion would provide high quality, popular work for AP and its successors in the decades ahead. Bunn was swiftly assigned to continue "Buck Jones" after the back inventory ran dry. "Thunderbolt Jaxon" was less popular, and after the existing material would have to wait until a 1958 revival in the pages of Knockout for new adventures. While the humour cartoons were jettisoned, some light relief was provided by illustrated abridged versions of Charles Hamilton's Billy Bunter (who was also appearing in Knockout at the time). Good response to Westerns saw Holmes bring in Kit Carson in September 1950 as a replacement for Buck Jones, while the adventures of 'wonder horse' Gallant Bess and a European import based on the exploits of Buffalo Bill were also featured. The general success of Westerns with readers in the fifties would lead to AP launching the long-running digest-format Cowboy Picture Library title. Other adventure genres were represented by swashbuckler Guy Gallant, who took over the front page in February 1951, and the exploits of the improbably named ace reporter Splash Page (previously an ally of detective Sexton Blake in the pages of Union Jack), while Billy Bunter transitioned to a picture strip. Fantasy was provided by Professor Jolly and his Sky Adventurers, initially a text comic before becoming a full picture strip and running until 3 April 1953, taking over from Guy Gallant on the front cover.

The Comet Adventure Weekly, 29 September 1956.

From 17 January 1953 the comic was reconfigured to 16 standard-sized pages. August saw the start of new cover feature "Strongbow the Mohawk", concerning a white man taken in and raised by the native American tribe. When his adoptive clan were massacred, Strongbow became a small town doctor by day while donning his tribal outfit by night to bring the killers to justice. While the convoluted double identity aspect was later deemphasised, the strip (drawn by Philip Mendoza) was a success and would continue until 1957 after moving to the interior. The same year also saw the return of Buffalo Bill; after imported American newspaper strips proved a hit, new material was created from January 1954 and the character would stay a feature until the magazine was cancelled, taking over on the front cover from Strongbow. Introduced in September 1953, "laughing cavalier" Claude Duval was another who would remain a fixture for the remainder of what was by now simply titled Comet's run. The comic's version of Duval - a dashing Royalist officer, compared to a a French highwayman - was popular enough that it would be the inspiration for the 1957 television series The Gay Cavalier. Also popular with readers was Butterworth's retelling of the Norman conquest of Britain in "Under the Golden Dragon", illustrated by Patrick Nicolle on the colour centre pages - which would be home to several historical epics. Less enduring was Dick Barton, who appeared on the front cover some three years after the famous radio show had ended, before disappearing nine months later.

By now both Comet and Sun were facing heavy competition from not only Hulton Press' acclaimed Eagle and Scots arch-rival DC Thomson, but also fresher AP boys' titles Lion and Tiger, while Westerns in general were being pushed out by the audience's growing interest in World War II action. 1956 saw the title respond to the science fiction trend with the futuristic Jet-Ace Logan, one of a slew of Dan Dare clones that appeared in British comics of the period. Despite his derivative nature, art from Campion and later John Gillatt helped Logan and his majestically named assistant Plumduff Charteris find an audience, and the strip was another to run until the final issue. June 1957 saw a format change, dropping the front cover strip in favour of a full-page art cover. Other features were less impressive at this point; they included film adaptations (some as picture strips, some as prose "illustrated" by stills from the movie), overseas imports, and reprints of material - particularly from Knockout and AP's growing line of Picture Library titles. Comet however continued to lose sales. Hoping to both shore up its profitability and more closely aligned it with their newer boys' weeklies, June 1958 saw Comet drop the photogravure printing and painted covers, instead become a 22-page newsprint title with three-colour front covers (initially overlaid with blue and later red). Billy Bunter was a casualty of the redesign, which instead brought in war story "Commando One". Circulation continued to drop however, and Comet ended after 580 issues in October 1959, shortly after AP was reorganised into Fleetway Publications, merging into Tiger the following week.

"Jet-Ace Logan" would continue in Tiger and Comet until 7 May 1960, before the comic reverted to Tiger once again; Logan would however stay part of the line-up until March 1968, albeit in reprint form for the final three years. The only other strip to make the move was "Commando One", and even then only as a one-off to conclude the story. The various stories created for Comet have been owned by Rebellion Publishing since 2018.

== Titles ==
- The Comet - 20 September 1946 to 18 March 1950
- Comet Comic - 25 March 1950 to 22 March 1952
- Comet - 29 March 1952 to 18 August 1956
- The Comet Adventure Weekly - 25 August 1956 to 21 June 1958
- Comet Weekly - 28 June 1958 to 11 April 1959
- Comet - 18 April to 17 October 1959
- Tiger and Comet - 21 October 1959 to 7 May 1960
