= Philip Mendoza =

British artist and cartoonist (1898–1973)

Montague Philip Mendoza (14 October 1898 – 1973) was a London-born British artist and cartoonist. He served as a private with the British Army from 1914 until 1920. After the World War I and during World War II, he became a popular poster designer. In 1951, he became a comic artist.

Most of his poster art featured anthropomorphised mice.
