= Fleetway Publications =

British comics-publishing company (founded 1959)

- Founded: 1959
- Defunct: 2002
- Successor: Egmont
- Country of origin: United Kingdom
- Headquarters location: London
- Publication types: Comic books

Fleetway Publications was a magazine publishing company based in London.

== History ==
It was founded in 1959 when the Mirror Group acquired the Amalgamated Press, then based at Fleetway House, Farringdon Street, London. It was one of the companies that merged into the IPC group in 1963, and the Fleetway banner continued to be used until 1968 when all IPC's publications were reorganised into the unitary IPC Magazines.

In 1987, IPC's comics line was sold to Robert Maxwell as Fleetway Publications. Egmont UK bought Fleetway from Maxwell in 1991, merging it with their own comics publishing operation, London Editions Magazines, to form Fleetway Editions, but the name "Fleetway" ceased to appear on their comics some time after 2002.

In August 2016, Rebellion Developments acquired the Fleetway library from Egmont, making it the owner of all comics characters and titles created by IPC's subsidiaries after 1 January 1970, together with 26 specified characters which appeared in Buster and Roy of the Rovers. IPC retained its other comics characters and titles, including Sexton Blake, The Steel Claw, and Battler Britton, until 2018 when it sold them to Rebellion too. The exception was Dan Dare, which was sold separately and is now owned by the Dan Dare Corporation.
