= Monster (comics) =

British comic book story

- Kenny Corman (left) and Uncle Terry from "Monster" in a panel from the 26 May 1984 edition of Scream!, art by Jesus Redondo.

Publication information
- Publisher: IPC Magazines
- Schedule: Weekly
- Title(s): Scream! 24 March to 30 June 1984; Eagle; 1 September 1984 to 30 May 1985; Scream! Holiday Special; 1986 to 1988
- Formats: Original material for the series has been published as a strip in the comics anthology(s) Scream! Eagle.
- Genre: Horror
- Publication date: 24 March 1984 – 30 May 1985
- Main character(s): Uncle Terry; Kenny Conway

Creative team
- Writer(s): Alan Moore; John Wagner and Alan Grant (Note: Credited as 'Rick Clark'.)
- Artist(s): Alberto Giolitti; Jesus Redondo
- Editor(s): Ian Rimmer; Dave Hunt

Reprints
- Collected editions
- Monster: ISBN 9781781084533

"Monster" is a British horror comic strip character, appearing in titles published by IPC Magazines. The strip debuted in the weekly anthology Scream! on 24 March 1984, before continuing in Eagle until 30 May 1985. The opening episode was written by Alan Moore, with the remainder by John Wagner and Alan Grant; art was provided by Alberto Giolitti, and later Jesus Redondo. The story concerned a young boy called Kenny's attempts to get his deformed, abused uncle Terry help.

== Creation ==
Senior editors Barrie Tomlinson and Gil Page were assigned to put together the anthology title Scream! for IPC, despite management reservations due to the illegality of horror comics in Britain since the passing of the Children and Young Persons (Harmful Publications) Act 1955 and the negative publicity received by the controversial Action in 1976. The pair were forced to find a balance for the contents, which Tomlinson would later describe as making the comic "a bit frightening, without being a horror comic".

Alan Moore, who had written "Skizz" and was working on "D.R. & Quinch" for IPC's 2000 AD, worked on the initial story and would write the opening episode before handing over to John Wagner and Alan Grant; Moore at the time was heavily committed elsewhere, also writing "Miracleman" and "V for Vendetta" for Quality Communications' Warrior, and was being tapped by DC Comics to work on Swamp Thing. At the time Wagner and Grant were such prolific contributors to IPC comics that managing director John Sanders insisted they use pen names for some of their work; for "Monster" the pair were credited as 'Rick Clark', which they would also use for - among others - "Invasion 1984!" in Battle. Art for the first episode was provided by Alberto Giolitti, head of the Giolitti art agency and primary artist on Eagle strip "Doomlord"; from the second episode Spaniard Jesus Redondo, whose British work included "Mind Wars" for Starlord.

== Publishing history ==
The Moore/Giolitti 8-page opening episode of "Monster" appeared in the launch issue of Scream! dated 24 March 1984 (Note: The cover date was actually the last day on which the issue was on sale, so the issue would have been published the previous Monday), with the Wagner/Grant/Redondo team taking over from the second issue. However, IPC's nervousness regarding the title saw constant management interference, necessitating many rewrites. After just 15 issues it was cancelled, officially due to the knock-on effect of the 1984 NUJ strike, though many believe that management wariness played a large part in Scream!'s demise.

Instead the comic would be merged with Eagle, which had been relaunched in 1982. Only two strips would make the transition to Eagle and Scream! - "Monster" and "The Thirteenth Floor". Due to the late decision regarding the cancellation of Scream! and the industrial action, the merged comic would not begin until September 1984, some three months after the last issue of Scream! had been published. "Monster" would run in Eagle until 30 March 1985, being dropped to make room for the contents of another cancelled title, the long-running Tiger. Text stories however continued to appear in annual Scream Holiday Specials until 1988. Grant enjoyed writing the story, later describing himself as having a "soft spot" for "Monster".

In 2016, the post-1970 IPC material owned by Egmont Publishing, including the contents of Scream!, was purchased by Rebellion Developments. Shortly afterwards, "Monster" was reprinted in a collected edition. Due to the original negatives for the story being lost, the story had to be remastered from scans of Scream! back issues.

== Plot summary ==
12-year old Kenny Corman buries his abusive father in the back garden of the family's ramshackle house in Burfleet, after finding him killed by something mysterious in the attic. Exploring, he discovers his deformed, freakishly strong uncle Terry has been kept chained up in the loft; with his mother Joan (Terry's sister) having already died, Kenny is left responsible for looking after him. Terry's upbringing has left him with a very limited understanding of the outside world; when Thacker, one of his father's acquaintances turns up looking for money owed to him, Terry interprets it as an attack and kills the man. Kenny buries the body but realises staying in the house will raise problems, especially after a storm causes the bodies of his father and Thacker to resurface. The pair go on the run, while police inspector Halley investigates the Corman household, and a manhunt starts. Kenny meanwhile tries to impress on Terry that killing is wrong, and resolves to find his uncle help for his murderous temper. The pair of fugitives reach Aberdeen, as Kenny has heard of a doctor who specialises in the area is living in Cromarty, but Terry kills two men who try to capture them soon after they arrive, and a poacher soon afterwards as the police close in.

Kenny is separated from Terry and hospitalised when a boat the pair are using overturns. He tries to explain the story to the authorities, who believe Terry drowned. However, he resurfaces and meets a doctor, who pretends to help Terry before attempting to sedate him, leading to the monster killing him. The police restart their dragnet as Terry searches for Kenny, his wanderings taking him to Blackpool where he is finally injured and captured after killing more. Halley is able to persuade Kenny to persuade Terry to go quietly to prison, where he can be cared for without harming others, while the boy is sent to a council children's home. Terry is sentenced to life in a maximum security hospital, while Kenny is set to move to Australia and live with an aunt. However, the van transporting Terry crashes, leaving him roaming the Southampton area and attempting to find a way to follow Kenny to Australia by boat, but is discovered by the crew during the journey. Terry befriends a young crew-member called Mitch but gets loose as the ship nears port, falling into shark-infested waters - but makes it ashore alive and begins searching for Kenny. He befriends a Bushman called Digger, who takes him in but later finds out the truth about Terry from a newspaper; realising he has no malice, Digger persuades Terry to abandon the search for Kenny and live with him, staying off the grid in peace.

== Collected editions ==
Title	ISBN	Publisher	Release date	Contents
Monster	9781781084533	Rebellion Developments	13 July 2016	Material from Scream! 24 March to 30 June 1984, Eagle 1 September 1984 to 30 May 1985, Scream Holiday Special 1986 to 1988

== Reception ==
Reviewing the collected edition for Down the Tubes, Ian Wheeler felt the story was "one of the best British comic strips ever created", praising its mix of adventure and pathos. D. Emerson Eddy felt that "Monster" didn't quite live up to the early promise of Alan Moore's opening episode, but overall felt it was still an "entertaining serial".
