= Mind Wars =

British comic book story

- "Mind Wars" on the cover of the 22 July 1978 edition of Starlord.
- Publisher: IPC Magazines
- Publication date: 20 May – 7 October 1978
- Genre: Science fiction
- Title(s): Starlord; 20 May to 7 October 1978
- Main character(s): Arlen Lakam; Ardeni Lakam

Creative team
- Writer(s): Alan Hebden
- Artist(s): Jesus Redondo; Ian Gibson
- Editor(s): Kelvin Gosnell

"Mind Wars" is a British comic science fiction adventure story published in the weekly anthology Starlord from 20 May to 7 October 1978 by IPC Magazines.

The story takes place in the year 3000 during the midst of a galactic war, following 17-year old twins Arlen and Ardeni Lakam. Alien invaders attempt to turn them into living weapons by activating their powerful latent psychic abilities, leading to the siblings becoming caught in the middle of the conflict.

== Creation ==
Starlord was originally planned by IPC and editor Kelvin Gosnell as a high-quality science fiction fortnightly with two ongoing 10-12 page serials in the form of "Strontium Dog" and "Ro-Busters". However, with the launch impending IPC management changed their minds and ordered the comic to be a regular weekly, requiring Gosnell and assistant editor Steve MacManus to find three new strips on short notice to fill the comic.

Alan Hebden had primarily written war comics and was working on Battle Picture Weekly at the time, where he had worked with Carlos Ezquerra on the likes of "Major Eazy" and "El Mestizo" but enjoyed the science fiction genre - being fan of Cordwainer Smith - and pitched "Mind Wars" to Glosnell and MacManus, rapidly getting the nod - and also being assigned to rewrite "Planet of the Damned", an abandoned Pat Mills story originally pitched for the early issues of 2000 AD, which Hedben repurposed as a quasi-sequel to his own "Death Planet". He would later feel Ardeni being a strong female character enabled the script to work well. Art duties were assigned to Jesus Redondo, a Spanish artist who had primarily worked on girls' comics for DC Thomson and had a reputation for a fast work-rate. He was already committed to working on a series for Dutch girls' comic Tina at the time, and would later recall: -

I remember doing Mind Wars at the same time as another story for Netherlands; for five days in a week I sleep only three hours a night... It was terrible. It is curious because the editors tell me, "Well, it's your best work, Congratulations."

— Jesus Redondo, quoted by Michael Molcher, "Days of Wine & Warlocks", Judge Dredd Megazine #296 (31 March 2010)

== Publishing history ==
Due to several additional features in the first issue of Starlord, "Mind Wars" didn't debut until the second, dated 20 May 1978. Starlord was a modest sales success, but it soon became clear it was splitting the market with 2000 AD and that the comics would need to be merged. "Mind Wars" was not selected for continuation, and Hebden was forced to rewrite the story by combining two scripts to make a conclusion for the 22nd and final issue of Star Lord, dated 7 October 1978. Hebden was disappointed at Starlord's demise, feeling "it was much better than 2000 AD, as it had better stories and was a better all round comic", though he gained some recompense as he was paid for both the two scripts and for rewriting them into a single episode. He would later rate "Mind Wars" alongside "Meltdown Man" from 2000 AD as his favourites from his own work.

A new story would feature in the 1981 Starlord Annual. In 2019, "Mind Wars" was issued as a series of supplements with Judge Dredd Megazine - with the strips from the weekly available with #408 and #409, and the story from the 1980 annual in #410.

== Plot summary ==
In 3000, war has broken out between the human Stellar Federation and the alien Jugla Empire. While the Federal Interstellar Strike Corps (FISC) are able to fend off the Jugla fleets they are unable to counterattack as they don't know where the Jugla home world is. Both Federal Controller Doctor Varn and his opposite number Cosmol Na-Rutha realise that they are in a state of stalemate, but the Cosmol has a plan to break the deadlock. On the Federation colony of Vulcrugon, twins Ardeni and Arlen are however targeted by the aliens, who destroy their home and kill the pair's parents bathing them with Primary Neural Irradiation. They both find they suddenly have impressive mental powers. The pair are taken in by the colony's authorities after Arlen deflects a falling Federation interceptor and Ardeni brings the pilot back from the dead, with the Federation believing they are Jugla plants, something made worse when the Cosmol is able to trigger their powers during their trial. The pair use their powers to warp out of the trial, but Federal special agent Yosay Tilman finds them and offers them the chance to escape the colony and make for Earth to explain themselves and see if their powers can help the Federation - with secret orders to kill them if that isn't the case. However, they are unaware that Na-Rutha also wants them there so he can use them to devastate the Federation's home-world. The trio evade Vulcrugon security, but an increasingly concerned Varn orders their execution. However, he eventually decides to help the twins gain control of their powers instead and takes them on board the Solar Saint, a Lenarthian cargo ship, joined by the friendly alien Kola Rashnik of the Garduiant Star Chain.

The battle for the twins escalates, with the planet Yu-Jubum and the FISC flagship destroyed in the process, causing the Jugla to attempt a mass attack on Earth in the chaos. The FISC are able to drive off the invasion, and the Solar Saint lands. Kola dies soon afterwards, causing the twins to teleport to Varn and confront him. Na-Rutha attempts to use Ardeni to send a cobalt fission bomb into the Sun and send it supernova. Ardeni is able to free herself from Jugla control and stop the bomb, but only after killing Arlen. She swears to find the alien planet and destroy it in revenge, refusing help from the Federation. She and Tilman take Varn's personal ship Vegan Belle for the search. Na-Rutha attempts to regain control of Ardeni and sends warships to intercept them, without success. However, she eventually realises that destroying the Jugla is not the answer, and neutralises the weapons of both Na-Rutha and Varn's forces before departing with Tilman, leaving the two civilisations with no choice but to work together.

The uneasy peace between Earth and Jugla continues for a year until a vengeful Na-Rutha attempts to recruit the telepathic Brood Mother to gain revenge on Ardeni. She has chosen to stop using her powers and is working as a nurse on the planet Garagagon, but reactivates them when the Federation's population become irrationally aggressive under alien influence. She is able to stop the attacks and takes over Na-Rutha's ship, sealing it and sending it hurtling through space. Ardeni resolves to continue using her powers to help the needy.

== Reception ==
BEM columnist Ruan Lanihorne felt the discontinuation of "Mind Wars" was one of the saddest features of Starlord's demise, noting it "was a strip I wasn't too keen on at first - but it's grown, expanded, matured" and would later again express sadness at it not being able to find a place in the merged 2000 AD and Starlord.

John Freeman has described "Mind Wars" as "one of my all-time British comic favourites", praising it as a "cracking space opera". Michael Molcher complemented Redondo's "mind-bending" art and the "harder edge" to the story.
