= Metalzoic =

1986 graphic novel

- Metalzoic on the cover of 2000AD, art by Kevin O'Neill.

Publication information
- Publisher: DC Comics
- Genre: Science fiction
- Publication date: 1986

Creative team
- Written by: Pat Mills
- Artist(s): Kevin O'Neill; Bill Sienkiewicz (Graphic novel covers)

Metalzoic is a graphic novel (ISBN 0-930289-10-2) written by Pat Mills and drawn by Kevin O'Neill which was first published by DC Comics in 1986 as the sixth of the DC Graphic Novel line. Later in the same year it was reprinted in serial form in 2000 AD, issues #483–492.

== Plot ==
In the far future, the Earth's magnetic field has cut out, and humanity has abandoned the planet, leaving it to multiple species of sentient robots, which after centuries of evolving look (and in some cases behave) similar to the now extinct terrestrial animals. This signals the end of the Humanic period, and the beginning of the Metalzoic age.

Legend surrounds The God Beast - Amok - the leader of a herd of robotic elephants (wheeldebeasts), and his return to the geographical location that another tribe now occupies - the Mekaka, led by the psychotic - yet also cunning - gorilla robot Armageddon. Armageddon's brutality and drive is explained that he operated on his own brain to remove lesser emotions which would impede his intentions to make "The Mekaka the greatest tribe on Earth".

At the same time Armageddon leads his tribe to search for Amok, The God Beast is returning to the Mekaka's territory, and needing metal to facilitate repairs to himself, he attacks the Mekaka tribe, killing Armageddon's mate - Koola - and almost Armageddon's son - Ham. Only the intervention of a Novad human - Jool - (who Armageddon had unintentionally rescued earlier) prevents his destruction as well.

Armageddon is in fact consumed by Amok, but he draws on the planets magnetic field and reconstitutes himself - Pumping Iron - subsequently vowing to track down and kill Amok, which he now believes to have gone rogue.

After following Amok's trail they arrive at the Pits of Zinja - a long since exhausted mine, and coincidentally Jool's last home. During a three-way fight between the Mekaka, the Wheeldebeasts and the Zinja, Jool believes that The God Beast has not brought the herd to Zinja for more metal, but to kill them, as he buries them in the empty pits. To prevent this, Armageddon attacks The God Beast directly, and inadvertently hacks into his brain - releasing The Master Program into Armageddon. Breaking the fourth wall, The Master Program explains to the reader how Earth came to be (mentioning the only date in the series - that the Earth's magnetic field cut out in the 24th century) and also reveals to Armageddon that The God Beast is not destroying his herd, but protecting them from an imminent asteroid shower - the Moonsoon. As the asteroids start to fall, fighting is broken off and all the combatants take joint cover in the pits. As Armageddon now has ownership of The Master Program he becomes the new God Beast, Amok dies, and passes control of the herd onto Armageddon. Armageddon states that the ore in the asteroids will help him rebuild his tribe - referring to the Wheeldebeasts.

The graphic novel ends with the tribe shamek Jugarjuk commenting that now Armageddon has the Wheeldebeasts as well as his own Mekaka he will indeed control the world. Jool agrees, and quotes from Pythagoras, but this does not go down with the other surviving robots as well, and they leave in disdain - all apart from Ham who is strapped to her back.

== Earth's magnetic field ==
A core aspect of the graphic novel is that the Earth's magnetic field has cut out, allowing cosmic rays to bombard the planet, and rendering it uninhabitable to humanity. An equally important aspect of the graphic novel is Armageddon's ability to come into phase with the Earth's magnetic field and boost his own power output considerably - this is referred to as Pumping Iron and used several times throughout the novel, saving his life at least three times. The discrepancy is never clarified, despite being a potentially large plot hole.
