= Black Hawk (British comics) =

British comic book story

- Black Hawk on the cover to 2000 AD Prog. 137, dated 3 November 1979.

Character information
- First appearance: Tornado (14 April 1979)

In-story information
- Species: Human
- Place of origin: Earth

Publication information
- Publisher: IPC Magazines; Fleetway Publications; Rebellion Developments
- Schedule: Weekly
- Title(s): Tornado; 14 April to 18 August 1979; 2000 AD; 25 August 1979 to 19 April 1980; Tornado Annual; 1981; 2000 AD Annual; 1981 to 1982; 2000 AD Sci-Fi Special; 1982
- Formats: Original material for the series has been published as a strip in the comics anthology(s) Tornado; 2000 AD.
- Genre: Action/adventure
- Publication date: 14 April 1979 – 19 April 1980
- Main character(s): Black Hawk; Ursa; Batak; Zog

Creative team
- Writer(s): Tornado; Gerry Finley-Day; 2000 AD; Alan Grant/Kelvin Gosnell as "Alvin Gaunt"
- Artist(s): Tornado; Alfonso Azpiri; 2000 AD; Massimo Belardinelli; Ramon Sola; Joe Staton; Greg Guler
- Editor(s): Dave Hunt; Roy Preston; Steve MacManus

Reprints
- Collected editions
- Black Hawk: The Intergalactic Gladiator: ISBN 9781907992599

Black Hawk was a comic strip appearing on the British magazine Tornado, created by Gerry Finley-Day. It was one of three strips to transfer from Tornado to 2000 AD after the two merged.

== Creation ==
The lead character was inspired by Woody Strode's role in the film Spartacus.

== Plot synopsis ==
At the time of the Roman Empire a Nubian slave rises up against his captors and leads a rebellion. However his bravery is recognised by a Roman General and he is commissioned as a Roman Centurion. Black Hawk took his name from a Hawk that he adopted and assembled a crack platoon from hardened prisoners and other slaves. As with other Finley-Day war stories the basic plot was borrowed from The Dirty Dozen with Black Hawk's squad being singled out for the hardest missions.

In 2000 AD he is taken from his Roman captors by an alien species only to be entered into their own intergalactic gladiatorial events against other alien species. Black Hawk adopts a Wookiee type alien as a sidekick (ironically the Hawk that gave him his name was left behind on earth). Black Hawk manages to escape but ends up stranded on a planet orbiting a black hole. Here a creature called "The SoulSucker" removes Black Hawks soul and he pursues the SoulSucker relentlessly, eventually regaining it shortly before the end of the series run.

Eventually, Tharg the Mighty's race were written in, as a robotic "Kwark" created by the "Thargians", and the whole cast were sucked into a black hole. They are later seen in Tharg's desk drawer, full of other dead or discarded characters, where Black Hawk complains how long they have been waiting as Ace Garp is selected for a revival.

In the 2000 AD Yearbook 1994 it was acknowledged by the editor that this was a poor series, and Alan Grant had written himself into a corner.

== Bibliography ==
- "Black Hawk" (with Gerry Finley-Day and Azpiri, in Tornado #4-22, 1979)
- "Black Hawk" (with Alan Grant/Kelvin Gosnell as "Alvin Gaunt" and Alan Grant (2-34); Massimo Belardinelli, Ramon Sola (5, 16, 17), Joe Staton (6) and Greg Guler (17), in 2000 AD #127-161, 1979)
- "Black Hawk" (Tornado Annual 1981)
- "Death-Dive" (2000AD Annual 1981)
- "The Longest Walk" (with Alan Grant and Joe Staton, 2000AD Sci-Fi Special 1982)

=== Collected editions ===
All the stories are collected in one trade paperback:

Title	ISBN	Publisher	Release date	Contents
Black Hawk: The Intergalactic Gladiator	9781907992599	Rebellion Developments	10 November 2011	Material from Tornado 14 April to 18 August 1979, 2000 AD 25 August 1979 to 19 April 1980, Tornado Annual 1981, 2000 AD Annual 1981-1982 and 2000 AD Sci-Fi Special 1982.
