= Tornado (comics) =

British weekly comic

- The cover of the 12 May 1979 edition of Tornado featuring Dave Gibbons as Big E.

Publication information
- Publisher: IPC Magazines
- Schedule: Weekly
- Format: Ongoing series
- Genre: Action/adventure
- Publication date: 24 March – 18 August 1979
- No. of issues: 22

Creative team
- Created by: Kelvin Gosnell
- Written by: Gerry Finley-Day; Alan Hebden; Tom Tully
- Artist(s): Alfonso Azpiri; Massimo Belardinelli; Mike Dorey; Vanyo
- Editor(s): Kelvin Gosnell; Dave Hunt

Tornado was a British weekly boys' adventure comic published by IPC Magazines from 24 March to 18 August 1979. (Note: The cover date was actually the last day on which the issue was on sale, so the issue would have been published the previous Monday) The comic was partly created as a way to use up stories already commissioned for other titles, and was marred by a difficult production. Tornado sold poorly and was merged with 2000 AD after 22 issues.

== Creation ==
The cancellation of Valiant in 1976 and Action the following year had left IPC Magazines without a standard multi-genre boys' weekly. 2000 AD firmly established as a science fiction title (something reinforced by its merger with Starlord); Battle was likewise established as a war comic; and the venerable Tiger had become the company's best-selling weekly due to editor Barrie Tomlinson's decision to focus heavily on sport. However, this meant several stories that had been commissioned that did not fit in with the extant titles were on file at IPC, who had a policy against wasting paid-for material. As such, after overseeing the merger of 2000 AD and Starlord, Kelvin Gosnell was recruited by editorial director John Sanders to launch a new title to use some of the stories up. The launch cost would be offset by the savings in material, and should the new weekly prove a success could be continued. Gosnell picked Richard Burton as assistant editor and Jan Shepheard as art director.

The comic was initially conceived with the title Heroes. To fit into the theme, and influenced by the runaway success of the Salkinds' film version of Superman, Gosnell decided that the comic's fictional editor - a device used successfully with Tharg the Mighty in 2000 AD and the eponymous host of Starlord - would be 'the U.K.'s first real live super hero'. As a result, artist Dave Gibbons found himself talked into dressing up as The Big E (for 'editor') for photographs; the character would be introduced by Tharg in the first issue, with the Mighty One introducing his trainee. John Wagner had been the first choice to don the spandex costume, but in Gibbons' recollection asked for too much money. Despite his embarrassment, Gibbons volunteered on the grounds it would be "a day's work and it'll be a laugh". The photographs for the character were taken at the top of King's Reach Tower, and Gibbons would later recall the high winds and the Big E's cape were a bad combination. While acknowledging the unintentional amusement the modelling brought, Gibbons would see the lighter side - "Quite frankly, I don't mind at all, I'm quite at peace with my inner superhero".

New material included a Sexton Blake strip, which Chris Lowder was eager to write. However, word came down that Blake was considered outdated and the character was subtly changed to become the new Victor Drago. Lowder was deeply unhappy, and would leave the strip after contributing only a few scripts. Other sources have suggested IPC no longer had the rights to Blake, forcing the rename. Mike Dorey, a fan of Blake, particularly Eric Parker's strips in Knockout, signed up to draw the strip. "The Mind of Wolfie Smith" meanwhile was written by veteran Tom Tully, and followed a young boy with extrasensory perception, with Vanyo as artist. Alan Hebden had contributed "Death Planet" to 2000 AD and reworked an old Pat Mills idea as "Planet of the Damned" in Starlord, and worked with Massimo Belardinelli on the thematically similar "The Angry Planet" for Tornado. "Wagner's Walk" meanwhile was about a German prisoner of war escaping from the Red Army, and was credited to the pseudonymous 'R.E. Wright'; it has been speculated that the story was originally written as a continuation of "Hellman of Hammer Force" (which ended with Major Kurt Hellman captured during the closing stages of the Battle of Berlin). Meanwhile, various archival strips were featured under the banner "Triple T" - Tornado's True Tales - despite their questionable veracity, and Kevin O'Neill contributed humour cartoon "Captain Klep".

The Heroes name was dropped when an Australian member of staff pointed out that Hero was brand of condoms in his home country, and with Australia making up around 8% of the company's business a renaming was needed. Gosnell however would recall that the orders to change the name came from the board, and was not explained. Nevertheless, he came up with the name 'Tornado' based on the jet fighter, which had recently entered service with the RAF, and in keeping with Valiant, Victor and Vulcan sharing names with the V bombers. Steve MacManus, at the time acting editor of 2000 AD, remembered the change threw the launch plans into chaos. Nick Landau reportedly pointed out that Tornado was also the name of a cleaning product, but was ignored.

Gosnell meanwhile found his already-fractious relationship with IPC managing editor Bob Bartholomew get more fraught; fed up with what he felt was interference from Bartholomew, he quit as editor of Tornado. Gosnell would later describe Tornado as "a complete bag of worms" and the run-up to the launch as a "completely disastrous piece of head-fucking". While Sanders was able to persuade Gosnell to remain at IPC as a script editor, Battle editor Dave Hunt - who would describe Gosnell's actions as a "fit of pique" - moved over to supervise the inexperienced Burton on Tornado. Despite the internal reorganisation, Tornado was announced early in 1979.

== Publication history ==
The first issue of Tornado was dated 24 March 1979, and included a free 'Turbo Flyer' - apparently "designed with the same aerodynamic manoeuvrability" as the Tornado strike-fighter - complete with instructions inside the cover to only use the thing outside. Further editorial characters were invented - mild-mannered Percy Pilbeam played the Clark Kent to the Big E's Superman, with Samantha 'Sam' Stevens as Lois Lane, while Billy Preston was apparently a gung-ho young roving reporter finding stories for Tornado. Readers were to write to Percy with their questions and Sam as - unusually for a boys' comic - an agony aunt, offering to help readers with "hassles with Big Sis' using her nail varnish on your plastic models". Big E and his cohorts also encouraged readers to be heroes themselves by performing good deeds, and write in about them.

Due to the use of some archival material, features were introduced as and when needed for space reasons. The third issue introduced gypsy nomad "Storm" by Scott Goodall, initially by Xavier Musquera and soon taken over by Cam Kennedy. The following edition debuted "Black Hawk", about a former slave in Ancient Rome. Writer Gerry Finley-Day modelled the title character on Draba, the character played by Woody Strode in the Stanley Kubrick film Spartacus. while Gosnell and MacManus would later contribute maverick cop story "The Lawless Touch". From June, Tornado ran a string of covers unrelated to the strips, instead being part of the "It's Your Turn" competition - readers were to send in a 350-word story based on the image, with the best one winning £20.

After Hunt moved on to edit new football magazine Top Soccer, Hunt was replaced by former 2000 AD subeditor Roy Preston. By this point, due to the 6-8 week cycle of preparing the comic, the first 8 or 9 issues were already complete. He would later recall "the comic launched like a stone and carried on sinking", and recalled he was pressed to include as much inventory material as possible. Alan Grant reportedly turned down a role as sub-editor on the title as he believed the comic would last less than six months, and recalled betting £5 against Sanders over the prediction.

The plug was pulled on Tornado after 22 issues due to low sales, with Preston moving over to work with Hunt on Top Soccer and Tornado slated to merge with 2000 AD. Tornado was one of several IPC titles to be cancelled after 22 issues, along with Thunder, Jet and Starlord. Tomlinson would later explain that at the time this was typically because it took 22 weeks for meaningful sales trends to be analysed with the technology of the time.

== Legacy ==
=== 2000 AD and Tornado ===
Following Gosnell's departure, MacManus had become editor of 2000 AD, on what was initially planned to be a temporary basis. He was on holiday when the order came to incorporate Tornado into 2000 AD, which had only recently amalgamated with Star Lord. Instead Alan Grant would oversee the merger. Sanders has dismissed rumours that MacManus refused to carry out the merger, stating he would have fired him if that had been the case - "I didn't run the sort of organisation where editors could refuse to do something I told them to".

"Black Hawk", "The Mind of Wolfie Smith" and "Captain Klep" continued in 2000 AD and Tornado, with "Dan Dare" and "Project Overkill" dropped to make space. "Mars Force", a strip developed for Tornado before its cancellation by Richard Burton and Belardinelli, was reported to be joining the 2000 AD line-up further down the line, but ultimately did not do so. While "Project Overkill" was concluded in a hurried fashion, "Dan Dare" was partway through a story. While the strip was planned to return, Dare did not feature again and his next appearance - in the 1982 revival of the Eagle - did not continue the storyline from 2000 AD.

"The Mind of Wolfie Smith" was reworked to fit in with the darker tone of 2000 AD, with Tom Tully increasing the focus on the character's ESP, and first Ian Gibson and then Jesus Redondo taking over on art duties until Mike Dorey drew the final instalment (under the pseudonym 'J. Clough'). "Black Hawk" meanwhile was transferred from Ancient Rome to outer space; Finley-Day had tired of the strip, and Grant would take over as writer.

The merger was not popular with 2000 AD readers, as after the merger issue 2000 AD and Tornado reverted to letterpress printing after a spell using web offset printing, and Grant recalled the title receiving many letters complaining of the loss of Dare in place of the Tornado stories. Nevertheless, the merger increased 2000 AD's circulation by 30%. The combined branding remained until the 13 September 1980 issue, when the Tornado name and "The Mind of Wolfie Smith" both ended, "Black Hawk" having finished a few months before.

=== Special and annuals ===
In common with many former IPC weeklies, the Tornado brand was still used for irregular publications, a tactic which allowed twice as many of these lucrative titles to be made. A summer special was issued alongside the weekly, and shortly after the weekly was cancelled a Tornado Annual, with a second following ahead of the 1980 Christmas period. Like the weekly, these leaned heavily on archival material.

=== Reprints ===
Rebellion Developments had taken over publication of 2000 AD and Judge Dredd Megazine in 2001, and issued a collection of the complete "Black Hawk" in 2011.

In 2017, Rebellion reprinted "The Lawless Touch" in a free supplement with Judge Dredd Megazine #387, and did the same with "Wagner's Walk" across two Judge Dredd Megazine #391-392. In 2020, Hibernia Books licensed "The Angry Planet" from Rebellion and reprinted it as the first volume in their Fleetway Files series of collections.

== Stories ==
=== The Angry Planet ===
Published: 24 March to 18 August 1979
Writer: Alan Hebden
Artist: Massimo Belardinelli

In 2002, colonisation of Mars begins in earnest. However, ninety years later the settlers soon find themselves exploited ruthlessly by Mars Incorporated. Matthew Markham leads the colonists' attempt to petition authorities on Earth for independence, but the corporation targets him for retribution.

=== Black Hawk ===
Published: 14 April to 18 August 1979
Writer: Gerry Finley-Day
Artist: Alfonso Azpiri

An African warrior captured by the powerful Roman army in 50 BC defies fate to join the Empire's Auxiliaries as an officer. 'Black Hawk' is given the assignment to find 100 soldiers who are eager to serve under him, and he does it while pulling his trusty desert hawk.

- Continued in 2000 AD.

=== Captain Klep ===
Published: 24 March to 18 August 1979
Writer: Dave Angus, Nick Landau
Artist: Kevin O'Neill

Due to the environmental differences between Earth and his home planet of Klepton, Captain Klep naturally possesses superpowers. After being raised in Hicksville, he relocates to Miniopolis to pursue his dream of being a professional superhero, enrolling with the Department of Heroes. They give him a position and a secret identity, but his inherent idiocy and clumsiness means he is of little use.

- Cartoon; continued in 2000 AD.

=== The Lawless Touch ===
Published: 2 June to 18 August 1979
Writers: Kelvin Gosnell, Steve MacManus (as Ian Rogan)
Artists: Barrie Mitchell, Mike White

Johnny Lawless is the most successful thief in Britain, with his meticulous approach leaving nothing to chance. However, he soon finds his skills have put him on the radar of the European Special Corps, an organisation that uses the best criminals in the world for dangerous but vital missions.

=== The Mind of Wolfie Smith ===
Published: 24 March to 18 August 1979
Writers: Tom Tully, Ken Armstrong
Artist: Vanyo

Ernest Patrick Smith was born with ESP, leaving him an outcast. Others nickname him 'Wolfie' because of his piercing eyes. When he becomes a teenager, Wolfie's powers grow in magnitude. As a result, he finds himself sent to a psychiatrist and accused of cheating at school as his life grows unpredictable.

- Continued in 2000 AD.

=== Storm ===
Published: 7 April to 18 August 1979
Writer: Scott Goodall
Artist: Xavier Musquerra, Cam Kennedy

Young Scots shepherd Andrew Kane finds a mysterious youth called Storm living in a cave with a cat called Skarr. He has been living in solitude for seven years and has developed tremendous physical skills, but Storm finds himself targeted by landowner Sir Gordon Forbes.

- Early episodes credited Cam Kennedy as 'S. Kennedy' due to IPC mistakenly believing the artist's given name was Sam.

=== Triple T/Big E's True Tales ===
Anthology features

- The Tale of Benkie

Published: 24 March to 7 April 1979
Writer: Steve Moore
Artist: Xavier Musquerra

- The Search

Published: 12 May 1979
Artist: Massimo Belardinelli

- Warrior

Published: 12 to 26 May 1979
Writer: Brian Burrell
Artist: John Richardson

- Moon Ghost

Published: 19 May 1979
Writer: Roy Preston (as G. Miller)
Artist: David Jackson

- The Man Behind the Gun

Published: 4 to 18 August 1979

- Man Eater

Published: 18 August 1979

=== Victor Drago ===
Published: 24 March to 18 August 1979
Writers: Chris Lowder (as Bill Henry), Roy Preston, Frank S. Pepper
Artist: Mike Dorey

In the early part of the 20th century, private investigator Victor Drago regularly helps his friend police Inspector John Carter and others solve crimes. Based in Baker Street, Drago is aided by Cockney sidekick Spencer and bloodhound Brutus.

- Drago also hosted factual feature "Victor Drago's Black Museum of Villains", which featured archival histories of the likes of Billy the Kid and Adolf Hitler. After a seven-part picture strip the story switched to prose with text illustrations for much of the rest of the comic's run.

=== Wagner's Walk ===
Published: 24 March to 18 August 1979
Artist: Eduardo Lozano, Mike White

May 1945 marks the end of the Second World War, and the Red Army is holding two million former German troops captive and subjecting them to years of arduous labour. Panzer Major Kurt Wagner and his crewmen Big Karl and Gruber, plot an escape to India.

- The script was credited to R.E. Wright, an IPC staff pseudonym.

== Spin-offs ==
- Tornado Summer Special (1 edition, 1979)
- Tornado Annual (2 editions, 1980 to 1981)

== Collected editions ==
Title	ISBN	Publisher	Release date	Contents
Black Hawk: The Intergalactic Gladiator	9781907992599	Rebellion Developments	10 November 2011	Material from Tornado 14 April to 18 August 1979, 2000 AD 25 August 1979 to 19 April 1980, Tornado Annual 1981, 2000 AD Annual 1981-1982 and 2000 AD Sci-Fi Special 1982.
The Angry Planet	N/A	Hibernia Books	1 December 2020	Material from Tornado 24 March to 18 August 1979

== Reception ==
In July 1979, BEM columnist Ruan Lanihorne counted four strips from Tornado in his top twenty British comic strips then in production - "Captain Klep" (#3), "Black Hawk" (#4) (behind 2000 AD stories "Judge Dredd" and "Ro-Busters"), "The Angry Planet" (#12) and "Wagner's Walk" (#19). Sanders' blunt evaluation of Tornado was that it failed "because it wasn't good enough and the staff bear the brunt of responsibility for that".
