= Future Shock! The Story of 2000AD =

- Film poster
- Directed by: Paul Goodwin
- Produced by: Sean Hogan; Helen Mullane
- Starring: Pat Mills; John Wagner; Neil Gaiman; Alan Grant; Brian Bolland; Dave Gibbons; Karl Urban; Grant Morrison
- Production company: Stanton Media
- Distributed by: Metrodome
- Release date: 21 September 2014 (Fantastic Fest)
- Running time: 100 minutes
- Country: United Kingdom
- Language: English

Future Shock! The Story of 2000AD is a 2014 documentary film about the history of British science fiction comic 2000 AD. Its world debut was at the 2014 Fantastic Fest in Austin, Texas, and subsequently shown at other US film festivals. Its UK debut was at the 2015 Edinburgh International Film Festival, and it had a limited theatrical release in the UK. It was released on DVD on 7 December 2015.
