= Tharg the Mighty =

- Tharg, from 2000 AD #1700. Art by Jon Davis-Hunt.

Publication information
- Publisher: Originally IPC Media (Fleetway) until 1999, thereafter Rebellion Developments
- First appearance: 2000 AD #1 (26 February 1977)
- Created by: Pat Mills

In-story information
- Place of origin: Quaxxann
- Notable aliases: The Mighty One, TMO
- Abilities: Rigellian hotshot

Tharg the Mighty or The Mighty One is the fictional editor of the British science fiction comic 2000 AD. The character was introduced on the cover of the first issue in 1977 and is one of only two characters to appear in almost every issue of the comic, the other being Judge Dredd. Tharg occasionally appears in stories, and strips involving him have been written by such notable writers as Alan Grant, Alan Moore and John Wagner, albeit usually credited to "TMO" – "The Mighty One".

== Characterisation ==
Tharg is depicted as an alien from Quaxxann, a fictional planet that orbits the star Betelgeuse. The character has green skin, a white mohawk hairstyle and a red device called the rosette of Sirius on his forehead. He is written and performed for comic effect as an authoritarian egoist. He eats polystyrene cups.

Tharg writes the comic's introduction, answers letters, and doles out prizes to readers (for artwork or story suggestions) - winners could choose payment either in pounds sterling or in "galactic groats". Tharg speaks mostly in English, but with various pithy Betelgusian aphorisms thrown in for colour.

In addition to the editorial duties in 2000 AD being attributed to Tharg, all writing, art, lettering, sub-editing and PR is attributed to malcontent, feckless and long-suffering droids that appear as caricatures of their actual counterparts.

In one episode, a Tharg suit in the comic's office was explained as a skin that Tharg had shed.

== Creation and concept ==
The concept of using a fictional character to host the comic is comparable to the tradition of hosts in horror comics. It was commonplace in British comics in the 1970s when 2000 AD began publication. For example, Warlord was supposedly edited by Lord Peter Flint and Bullet by a character named Fireball. 2000 AD's short-lived sister title Starlord used a similar device with the eponymous alien Starlord as did Tornado with Big E.

Pat Mills created Tharg but since regrets it, in 2015 describing him as an anachronism. In 1996 David Bishop was determined to get rid of Tharg and challenge the status quo, so replaced him as host in #1014 with the Vector 13 Men in Black. Reader reaction was "strong and vitriolic" and Tharg was reinstated in #1032. Bishop came to realise that Tharg is an intrinsic part of 2000 AD and that the Men in Black were "a tiresome encumbrance". Tharg's return and the ousting of the Men in Black was covered in the Vector 13 story "Case Ten: Case Closed?"

== 2000 AD editors ==
The role of Tharg has been performed by the following editors:

1. Pat Mills, #1–16 (1977)
2. Kelvin Gosnell, #17–85 (1977–1978) Assistant editor Nick Landau largely edited the comic himself in 1978 while Gosnell was occupied with editing new sister title Starlord.
3. Steve MacManus, #86–519 or #500 (1978–1987)
4. Richard Burton, #520–872 or #501–872 (1987–1994)
5. Alan McKenzie, #873–914 (1994)
6. John Tomlinson, #915–977 (1994–1996)
7. David Bishop, #978–1199 (1996–2000)
8. Andy Diggle, #1200–1273 (2000–2002)
9. Matt Smith, #1274–present (2002–present)

== Comic strips ==
2000 AD regularly features self-contained, science-fiction short stories called Tharg's Future Shocks. Tharg is generally characterised as the host or presenter of these one-shots. The format also sub-divides into genre-specific variants including: Tharg's 3rillers, Tharg's Alien Invasions, Tharg's Dragon Tales, and Tharg's Terror Tales.

On occasion 2000 AD includes short humorous strips that feature Tharg as a character. The plots often concern Tharg's conflict with Thrillsuckers, a plague of psychic pests that attempt to steal 2000 AD's Thrillpower, his abuse of his droid staff, and his battles against The Dictators of Zrag, rulers of the dull cube-shaped planet Zrag. This trio of incompetent alien warlords hope to usurp Tharg's position and use the comic's powers to revitalise their planet. Tharg uses the Dictators as convenient scapegoats whom he can blame for printing errors and plot holes.

=== Publication history ===
- Tharg and the Intruder (art by Kevin O’Neill, in #24, 1977)
- Captain Klep (written by Dave Angus, art by Robin Smith and unknown artists, in #127, #139, 1979)
- A Day in the Life of the Mighty Tharg (art by Carlos Ezquerra, in #129, 1979)
- Tharg's XMas Tale (art by Carlos Ezquerra, in #145, 1979)
- Judge Dredd - Christmas Party (art by Keith Page, in Dan Dare Annual, 1980)
- The Final Secret (art Robin Smith, in Sci-Fi Special, 1980)
- What Tharg Did on Sunday (art by Carlos Ezquerra, in #146, 1980)
- This is Your Life (art by Carlos Ezquerra, in #155, 1980)
- Tharg and the Cheat (written by Alan Grant, art by Carlos Ezquerra, in #162, 1980)
- The Great Human Rip-Off (written by Alan Grant, art by Carlos Ezquerra, in #176-77, 1980)
- Tharg and the Thrill Suckers (art by Carlos Ezquerra, in #180, 1980)
- Tharg Strikes Back! (art by Carlos Ezquerra, in #181, 1980)
- Tharg Saves the Day! (written by John Wagner, art by Carlos Ezquerra, in #182, 1980)
- Alien (Photostory, in Sci-Fi Special, 1981)
- Revenge of the Thrill Suckers (art by Ian Gibson, in #198-99, 1981)
- Tharg at the Party (art by Carlos Ezquerra, in #200, 1981)
- Tharg and the Creep Who Stole Croydon (art by Mike Dorey, in #207, 1981)
- The Day They Banned 2000 AD! (art by Ian Gibson, in #208-209, 1981)
- The Nightmare (art by Ian Gibson, in #222-23, 1981)
- Tharg's Christmas Tale (art by Eric Bradbury, in #243-44, 1981)
- Tharg's Birthday Party (art by Eric Bradbury, in #260, 1982)
- The Shedding (written by Alan Moore as T.M.O. (Tharg), art by Eric Bradbury, in #283-5, 1982)
- The Day the World Died (Nearly) (art P Knight, in Sci-Fi Special, 1983)
- Tharg and the Mice (art by Carlos Ezquerra, in #304, 1983)
- Invasion of the Thrill-Snatchers (art by Massimo Belardinelli, in #308-12, 1983)
- A Tharg Special Thriller: Mr Macabre (written by Alan Grant, art by Massimo Belardinelli, in #314, 1983)
- The Lethal Laziness of Lobelia Loam (written by Alan Moore, art by Boluda, in #323, 1983)
- The Challenge (art by Eric Bradbury, in #361, 1984)
- Zrag Law (art by Eric Bradbury, in #386, 1984)
- Judge Grexnix (art by Anthony Jozwiak, in #427, 1985)
- Exit the Wally (art by Carlos Ezquerra, in #435, 1985)
- Enter the Beast (art by Carlos Ezquerra, in #436, 1985)
- Psmith's Farewell (art by Carlos Ezquerra, in #443, 1985)
- Supersub! (art by Eric Bradbury, in #467, 1986)
- 2000BC (written by Grant Morrison, art by Eric Bradbury, in #473, 1986)
- Tharg's Head Revisited (art by Cam Kennedy, Dave Gibbons, Ian Gibson & Mike McMahon, in #500, 1986)
- Night of the Living Thrill Sucker (art by Eric Bradbury, in Sci-Fi Special, 1991)
- Galactic Greetings (art by Eric Bradbury, in #719, 1991)
- The Question (art by Eric Bradbury, in #749, 1991)
- Tharg's Masterclass (art by Eric Bradbury, in #823, 1993)
- The Perilous Perm of the Purple Nurples (art by Anthony Williams, in #841, 1993)
- Vector 13 "Case Ten: Case Closed?" (art by S.B. Davis, in #1032, 1997)
- A Night 2 Remember (written by Alan Grant, Andy Diggle, Dan Abnett, Gordon Rennie, Grant Morrison, John Tomlinson, Mike Carey, Pat Mills & Robbie Morrison, art by Anthony Williams, Frazer Irving, Ian Gibson, Jock, John Higgins, Kevin O’Neill, Kevin Walker, Simon Davis & Steve Yeowell, in #1280, 2002)
- A History Of 2000 AD In 5 Pages (in #1526, 2007)
- Whatever happened to?: Alec Trench (written by Alan Grant, art by Robin Smith, in Judge Dredd Megazine #242, 2006)
- Building a Better Comic (art by Anthony Williams, in #2014, 2013)
- The Secret of Prog 1977 (art by Mike Collins, in #1977, 2016)
- Untitled one page story (art by Henry Flint, in 2000AD Free Comic Book Day, 2017)

== Catchphrases and jargon ==
Tharg occasionally uses words and phrases from a fictional language. This slang has become part of the vocabulary of 2000 AD fan culture, particularly in fan interactions with Tharg. The following is a short list, with approximate translations:

- "Blurk" - bon appetit or enjoy your meal (with friends)
- "Borag Thungg" - Galactic Greetings
- "Deca Thargo" - A person who has read 2000 AD for ten years (Note: "Deca Thargo" was originally introduced in the 10 year anniversary issue (1987's Prog 520) and described as a "[n]ew award. Automatically given to any Earthlet who has read 2000 AD since prog 1", however this gradually changed into a generic 10 year award. As of 2025, long-term readers can have multiple Deca Thargo awards.)
- "Earthlings"/"Earthlet"/"Earthlette"/"Terran" - A human (Note: "Earthlet" and "Earthlette" were briefly combined into the gender-neutral "Earthlet" after a letter of complaint, but the term "Earthlette" was reintroduced in prog 531.)
- "Florix Grabundae" - Many thanks
- "Ghafflebette" - Out of this world
- "Grexnix" - Idiot or un-zarjaz person
- "Klfixam" - A keeper of the law
- "Krill Tro Thargo" - Honoured by Tharg, a special award to Earthlets who have helped advance the cause of Thrill-Power
- "Nazotimer" - A teacher
- "Nonscrot" - A person who does not read 2000 AD or prefers other comics
- "Quaequam Blag!" - an expression of surprise or outrage
- "Scrotnig" - packed with Thrill-Power (or very good in general)
- "Seto Thargo" - An Earthlet with a complete collection of 2000 AD progs
- "Splundig vur Thrigg" - Farewell
- "Splurix Klondie" - bon appetit or enjoy your meal (in polite company)
- "Squaxx dek Thargo" - A friend of Tharg / every regular reader of 2000 AD
- "Stanglic Crott" - A creator of a species / parent
- "Thrashoruns" - Best wishes
- "Thrill-Power" - excitement generated by reading 2000 AD
- "Throgloopnarg quae quam quallust stralk" - an expression of annoyance
- "Vinglop Hudsock" - Great enjoyment
- "Zarjaz" - Fantastic
