= Jesus Redondo =

Spanish comic artist (born 1934)

- Born: Jesús Redondo Román; August 8, 1934 (age 92) Valladolid, Spain
- Area: Artist
- Pseudonym: Redondo
- Notable works: Mind Wars, Return to Armageddon

Jesús Redondo Román (born 8 August 1934) is a Spanish comic artist who has been published in many countries, including Spain, the UK, the Netherlands, Sweden and the United States.

== Biography ==
The son of a schoolteacher, Redondo was born in Valladolid, Spain.

He moved to Madrid in 1958 to work for an advertising agency, and was soon head of studio. His first comics work was "Profesor Woosley" for Editorial Bruguera in 1962. His Spanish work includes El Capitán Trueno, Un Paseo por la Rioja, Centauro and SOS Dossier Ecológico. He has also drawn "Eduard & Emily" for the Dutch magazine Tina.

In the mid-1960s he began working for UK publishers D. C. Thomson & Co. and IPC, initially on girls' comics like Diana ("Suzette of the Silver Sword") and Jackie, later on boys' adventure comics like 2000 AD, Starlord, Tornado and Scream!, including drawing Dan Dare for the Eagle in 1986. In the 1990s he worked on Motormouth and Killpower for Marvel UK, and Star Trek and Kitty Pryde for Marvel US. In recent years he has been illustrating children's books as well as comics.

== Bibliography ==
Comics work includes:

=== 2000 AD ===
- M.A.C.H. 1:
  - "Airship" (with Nick Allen, in 2000 AD #13, 1977)
  - "Spotbox" (with Nick Allen, in 2000 AD #17, 1977)
  - "Planet Killers" (with Pat Mills, in 2000 AD #27-29, 1977)
  - "The Dolphin Tapes" (with Steve MacManus/Oniano, in 2000 AD #54-55, 1978)
- Tharg's Future Shocks:
  - "Poacher" (with Barry Clements, in 2000 AD #85, 1978)
  - "The Machine" (with Kelvin Gosnell, in 2000 AD #224, 1981)
  - "Giant Leap" (with Kelvin Gosnell, in 2000 AD #230, 1981)
  - "The Red House" (with Steve Moore, in 2000 AD #231, 1981)
  - "Love Thy Neighbour" (with Kelvin Gosnell, in 2000 AD #242, 1981)
  - "The Lanulos Run" (with David Perry, in 2000 AD #258, 1982)
  - "Nigel Goes a Hunting" (with Alan Grant, in 2000 AD #259, 1982)
  - "The Writing on the Wall" (with Alan Moore, in 2000 AD #268, 1982)
  - "One Christmas During Eternity!" (with Alan Moore, in 2000 AD #271, 1982)
  - "The Martians" (with David Perry, in 2000 AD #274, 1982)
  - "Sunburn" (with Alan Moore, in 2000 AD #282, 1982)
  - "Beware the Men in Black" (with David Perry, in 2000 AD #286, 1982)
  - "The Pioneer" (with Alan Hebden, in 2000 AD #302, 1983)
  - "Class of '65" (with Alan Hebden, in 2000 AD #382, 1984)
  - "The Edge of Forever" (with Alan Hebden, in 2000 AD #429, 1985)
- Project Overkill (with Kelvin Gosnell and Ian Gibson, in 2000 AD #119-126, 1979)
- Timequake (with Chris Lowder, in 2000 AD #148-151, 1980)
- The Mind of Wolfie Smith (with Tom Tully, in 2000 AD #162-175, 1980)
- Return to Armageddon (with Malcolm Shaw, in 2000 AD #185-218, 1980–81)
- Nemesis the Warlock Book 2 (with Pat Mills, 2000 AD #246-257, 1982)
- Time Twisters:
  - "Joy Riders" (with Alan Hebden, in 2000 AD #311, 1983)
  - "Ring Road" (with Alan Moore, in 2000 AD #320, 1983)
  - "The Time Machine" (with Alan Moore, in 2000 AD #324, 1983)
  - "The Great Infinity Inc. Foul-Up" (with Chris Lowder, in 2000 AD 356–357, 1984)
  - "Running Out of Time" (with Chris Lowder, in 2000 AD #362, 1984)
- Rogue Trooper: "First of the Few" (with Alan Moore, 2000 AD Annual 1984, 1983)
- Missionary Man: "Mark of the Beast" (with Gordon Rennie, in 2000 AD #1201-1204, 2000)
- Tharg's Terror Tales: "Birth of the Mazzikim" (with David Baillie, in 2000 AD #1737, 2011)
- Tharg's 3rillers: "Rewind" (with Robert Murphy, in 2000 AD #1856, 2013)

=== Starlord ===
- Mind Wars (with Alan Hebden and Ian Gibson, in Starlord #2-22, 1978)

=== Starblazer ===
- "The Promised Planet" (with G. Parker, Starblazer #96, 1983)
- "Pirates of the Ether Sea" (with Ray Aspden, Starblazer #100)
- "The Executioner" (Starblazer #165)
- "Ravenmaster" (with M Gately, Starblazer #257)

=== Eagle ===
- The Amstor Computer
  - "6746 - Journey on the Junk Food Express" (with Alan Hebden, Eagle #83, 1983)
- Dan Dare
  - "Marshall" (with Tom Tully, c. 1986)
  - "Untitled" (in Eagle Annual 1988, 1987)
  - "Untitled" (in Eagle Annual 1989, 1988)

=== Scream! ===
- Monster (with Alan Moore, John Wagner, 1984)

=== Various ===
- El Capitán Trueno (in Adventuras bizarras, 1987–89; La Revista de El Mundo, 1999)

=== Marvel ===
- Skeleton Warriors #2-3 (with Adam Bezark, 4-issue mini-series, Marvel Comics, May–June 1995)
- Star Trek: Voyager #1-12 (with Laurie S. Sutton, ongoing series, Marvel Comics, November 1996 - December 1997)
- Kitty Pryde, Agent of S.H.I.E.L.D. (pencils, with writer Larry Hama, 3-issue mini-series, Marvel Comics, December 1997 - February 1998)
- Spider-Man versus Doc Ock (with Ivan Vasquez) 2004
