= Starlord (comics) =

British weekly comic

- The cover of the 3 June 1978 edition of Starlord featuring "Strontium Dog", art by Carlos Ezquerra.

Publication information
- Publisher: IPC Magazines
- Schedule: Weekly
- Format: Ongoing series
- Genre: Action/adventure
- Publication date: 13 May – 7 October 1978
- No. of issues: 22

Creative team
- Created by: Kelvin Gosnell
- Written by: Alan Hebden; Chris Lowder; Pat Mills; John Wagner
- Artist(s): Carlos Ezquerra; Dave Gibbons; Ian Kennedy; Horacio Lalia; Brendan McCarthy; Carlos Pino
- Editor: Kelvin Gosnell

Starlord (Note: Occasionally referred to as Star Lord due to the design of the logo) was a British weekly boys' science fiction comic published by IPC Magazines from 13 May to 7 October 1978 (Note: The cover date was actually the last day on which the issue was on sale, so the issue would have been published the previous Monday), when it merged with 2000 AD after 22 issues. The comic was created by Kelvin Gosnell, and was originally intended as a fortnightly sister title for 2000 AD with higher production values and an older audience, but late changes in production saw it converted into a weekly.

While Starlord lasted for less than six months before amalgamation, it had a lasting effect due to debuting the long-running strip "Strontium Dog", as well as "Ro-Busters", the fore-runner of "ABC Warriors".

== Creation ==
2000 AD had been launched partly in anticipation of a boost in interest in science fiction due to Star Wars, and both the comic and the film had been successful. The runaway box office success of Star Wars in particular led to a massive boom in similar material, with Paramount planning to reactivate the Star Trek franchise, the BBC commissioning Blake's 7 and dusting off Flash Gordon serials for Saturday morning repeats, ABC preparing Battlestar Galactica and Marvel UK publishing Dez Skinn's news-and-reviews magazine Starburst. IPC Magazines' editorial director John Sanders would later relate he was "passionately obsessed with the 'me-too' idea. If you thought you had a winner, do a duplicate of it right away", reasoning that there was potentially a market for two science fiction comics and it would be better for IPC to launch their own 'competitor' rather than allow it to come from Marvel UK or DC Thomson. Initially Sanders approached Pat Mills - the driving force behind Battle Picture Weekly, Action and 2000 AD - to create the new comic but he demurred, feeling it was far too soon. Mills was also in conflict with IPC over his growing desire for greater rights and remuneration for himself and IPC creators in general, leading to his working relationship with Sanders souring.

Instead, Sanders turned to 2000 AD editor Kelvin Gosnell to put together the new comic. Gosnell would later greatly regret the move, calling it "one of the biggest mistakes of [his] life"; while he was still nominally editor of 2000 AD alongside Star Lord, much of the running of the former was carried out by assistant editor Nick Landau. He set out to make Starlord as more than a simple clone of 2000 AD by aiming for older readers by creating a fortnightly with longer stories of 10-12 pages per episode, with the move to 5-6 page stories in 2000 AD compared to the 3-4 in other boys' comics having been identified as a popular move with readers. Starlord would also feature web offset printing, and be all-colour. Gosnell hoped to create a British rival for the likes of Métal hurlant, Omni and Heavy Metal.

Gosnell worked with several 2000 AD contributors to come up with the new title. He recruited Battle assistant editor Steve MacManus to work on the title, but Kevin O'Neill turned down the post of art director, preferring to stay on 2000 AD despite the chance of a pay increase. He would later relate "...I didn't want to work on a knock-off of 2000 AD. Starlord didn't make a whole lot of sense to me, but it was a typical IPC thing to do". Instead Gosnell recruited Jan Shepheard, 2000 AD's art director. The team decided to follow 2000 AD's popular gimmick of being edited by the fictional character of 'host' Tharg the Mighty, and the eponymous Starlord - a bouffant-haired superhero, designed by Ian Gibson - was developed by MacManus and the experienced Chris Lowder; each issue's editorial content took the format of a primer for survival in the galaxy, and would be signed off with a catchphrase imploring readers to "keep watching the stars". Similarly, where 2000 AD issues were referred to as 'Progs', issues of Starlord were referred to as 'Starzines'. After O'Neill had succeeded in getting contributor credits printed in 2000 AD, they were included in Star Lord from the start - with the creators credited as 'Blueprinters'. MacManus disliked the character, later describing it as "puerile".

While Mills and O'Neill had turned down staff posts with Starlord, both contributed work to the title - partly as favours to Gosnell - with the strip "Ro-Busters", about a robot disaster-response squad. Mills wrote the initial episodes, while O'Neill designed the characters. Judge Dredd co-creator John Wagner meanwhile worked on futuristic mutant bounty hunter Johnny Alpha as the lead of "Strontium Dog", though Gosnell would recall they had difficulty coming up with a name for the character and the strip. He was joined by Battle artist Carlos Ezquerra, who had been involved in early work for "Judge Dredd" but had left the strip in acrimonious circumstances. Ezquerra partly agreed to draw "Strontium Dog" as a chance to get back over this perceived snub. These two main features were to be joined by a rotating one-off strip.

However, Gosnell's ambitious plans for the title were causing cold feet higher up in IPC. First of all the colour pages were cut back to eight per issue and then the reality of the cost of radically different printing began to dawn, and Sanders ordered the comic to be turned into a weekly, albeit with improved quality paper to retain the web offset design. Even with these cutbacks, the comic would still retail at 12p, compared to the 8p price of 2000 AD and Tiger. The 12-page stories were unsustainable for a weekly, so a crestfallen Gosnell was faced with suddenly having to find two further features to fill out the comic. "Planet of the Damned" was pulled from the archives, having originally been planned and then rejected for 2000 AD; originally devised by Mills and taken over by Alan Hedben, the stories were credited under the pseudonym 'R.E. Wright', a play on 'rewrite'; Lowder meanwhile hurriedly put together time-travel story "Timequake" and Hedben also began work on "Mind Wars". The increased demands of retooling the comic into a weekly left Gosnell with less and less time to work on 2000 AD; this led to a growing rivalry between Gosnell and Landau, with the latter revelling in taking chances and the former feeling without him the comic went too far. Sanders would later recall he chose not to intervene in their squabbling, believing it motivated both to push for improvements in their titles.

== Publication history ==
Boasting a cover-mounted 'Starlord Trooper' free badge, the first issue of Starlord was dated 13 May 1978, coming out on the preceding Monday - the same day as new issues of 2000 AD, to encourage new readers to pick up both on the same trip to the newsagents. "Mind Wars" joined the initial trio of stories from the second issue, but MacManus would later note that the late change of plans left Starlord with "two good stories and three weak ones". Finding contributors was also difficult as many were heavily involved in other projects, with Mills - busy on Judge Dredd storyline "The Cursed Earth" - soon quitting as "Ro-Busters" writer and many strips soon using a patchwork of artists. Gibson in particular found himself tapped for late fill-ins after getting a reputation for overnight jobs for "Death Game 1999" in Action.

While Starlord sold respectably it soon became clear that readers were picking it up instead of 2000 AD rather than as well as, effectively splitting the market. Gosnell would later suggest that Starlord had been launched under IPC management's infamous 'hatch, match and dispatch' philosophy, and was always planned to either be merged into 2000 AD or subsume it. Sanders has refuted any suggestion that IPC ever launched a title to fail, pointing to the £500,000 cost associated with a new launch as evidence that the "economics of it would never have stacked up". For his part Gosnell grew rapidly disenchanted with the perceived interference of managing editor Bob Bartholomew, who effectively had to sign off on all IPC's magazine output before it went to press.

Sanders meanwhile was left to figure out the conundrum of what to do with two under-performing science fiction titles. After some deliberation he decided against folding one or the other into a non-science fiction title such as Battle or Tiger and felt combining 2000 AD and Starlord to provide a single title was still a viable proposition. At the time Starlord was considerably outselling 2000 AD and seemed set to be the comic which continued; however, the former's circulation took a noticeable dip as Sanders was coming to his decision; while they were still slightly better than those for 2000 AD and IPC's policy was generally to keep the highest-selling title, Sanders followed a 'hunch' that the material in 2000 AD was "excitingly different" and would provide a better chance of long-term survival. After 22 issues, Starlord was cancelled and would be merged into its companion title.

== Legacy ==
=== 2000 AD and Starlord ===
The first issue of the rebranded 2000 AD and Starlord was dated 14 October 1978 with, unusually, equal emphasis given to both titles on the masthead. (This would last until 2000 AD’s 100th issue, dated 17 February 1979, when a redesigned logo clearly put the emphasis on 2000 AD.) Gosnell briefly returned to the title, with Landau moved across to Battle in an attempt to defuse the pair's deteriorating relationship, with MacManus instead installed as the title's assistant editor. In the comic itself was reorganised, with "Ant Wars" and the controversial "Harlem Heroes" sequel "Inferno" dropped to make room for new arrivals "Strontium Dog", "Ro-Busters" and "Timequake", with "Robo Hunter" and "Dan Dare" also put on a temporary hiatus. As was typical for merged titles, an all-new story was started the same week in the form of a sequel to the popular "Flesh".

Gosnell's return was short-lived as he was soon recruited by Sanders to work on another launch, for the ill-fated Tornado - a development which saw MacManus promoted to 2000 AD editor, initially on a temporary basis. Thanks to the influx of Starlord readers and both "Strontium Dog" (which saw the popular Ezquerra abandon his policy of not working for 2000 AD) and "Ro-Busters" becoming fast hits with 2000 AD readers, Sanders would count it as one of the most impressive merges in the company's history. While the sales had their expected spike from the amalgamation, sales of 2000 AD and Starlord began to climb. The title would remain the same until the 18 August 1979 edition, when it had to be changed to accommodate a merge with Tornado, but many consider the new strips and boost in sales from Star Lord to have gone some way to assuring 2000 AD's medium-term future. "Strontium Dog" would be a 2000 AD staple until the death of Ezquerra in 2018, while "Ro-Busters" was soon developed into the long-running "ABC Warriors".

=== Special and annuals ===
In common with many former IPC weeklies, the Star Lord brand was still used for irregular publications - a tactic which allowed twice as many of these lucrative titles to be made. As the weekly was heading towards cancellation, a 48-page Star Lord Summer Special was issued, featuring self-contained "Timequake", "Ro-Busters" and "Strontium Dog" strips, as well as one-off "Trash". Three Starlord Annual hardbacks were also produced for the Christmas market in 1979, 1980 and 1981 - per standard industry practice, these were dated for the following year to make it easier for retailers to move on unsold stock. Due to the comic's small number of features and overlap with 2000 AD the contents were eclectic in nature; they included reprints of old Lion stories "Captain Condor", "Jimmi from Jupiter", "The Return of the Sludge" and "The Robot Builders" from Tiger as archives were raided for anything science-fiction related.

=== Starlord in 2000 AD ===
When the title was cancelled and merged with 2000 AD, Starlord announced that his mission on Earth had been successfully completed and he was off to battle the evil Interstellar Federation on other worlds, though he urged his readers to "keep watching the stars". The fate of the comic's narrator would become something of an in-joke on letters pages in 2000 AD in later years.

When a 2000 AD reader asked after Starlord's whereabouts in a 1999 issue though, 2000 AD editor Tharg claimed that "While Starlord has not been sighted on Earth since 1979, rumours that he was seen in a McDonald's in Basingstoke cannot be entirely discounted". On another occasion, it was claimed that he was "out in the Rakkalian Cluster, singing lead soprano with an Alvin Stardust tribute band".

Heralding the 40th anniversary of the comic, and satirising the flurry of revelations regarding 1970s children's entertainers, it was suggested in a satirical story that Starlord was in fact a warmonger who brainwashed children to become child soldiers and had been imprisoned as a war criminal for the past four decades. The same year the comic was also covered in an episode of the 2000 AD Thrillcast podcast.

=== Reprints ===
Rebellion Developments had taken over publication of 2000 AD and Judge Dredd Megazine in 2001, and in 2016 purchased the remaining contents of Star Lord from Egmont Publishing along the rest of the post-January 1970 IPC archive.

Since then they have issued collected editions of "Strontium Dog" and "Ro-Busters" that have included Star Lord material, while "Mind Wars" has been issued as a series of supplements with Judge Dredd Megazine - with the strips from the weekly available with #408 and #409, and the story from the 1980 annual in #410.

In February 2026, Rebellion announced that they would be publishing a new collection, with volume 1 (which will collect Starlord starzines 1-12 and the Starlord Summer Special) due for release in November 2026.

== Stories ==
=== Holocaust ===
Published: 13 May – 7 October 1978
Writer: Alan Hebden
Artists: Horacio Lalia, Madigllianes

Private eye Carl Hunter becomes caught up in a hostile alien race's attempts to invade Earth.

=== Mind Wars ===
Published: 20 May – 7 October 1978
Writer: Alan Hebden
Artist: Jesus Redondo, Ian Gibson

In the year 3000, the human Stellar Federation is at war with the mysterious Jugla Empire. Twin 17-year olds Arlen and Ardeni Lakam find they have powerful mental powers and are caught up in the conflict.

=== Planet of the Damned ===
Published: 13 May – 8 July 1978
Writer: Pat Mills and Alan Hebden (both as R.E. Wright)
Artists: Horacio Lalia, Jesus Peña, Alfonso Azpiri

The passengers and crew of a jetliner fly over the Bermuda Triangle and disappear from Earth - finding that it is actually a spacetime warp taking them to a dangerous alien planet.

=== Ro-Busters ===
Published: 13 May – 7 October 1978
Writers: Pat Mills (both under his real name and as V. Gross), Chris Lowder (as both Bill Henry and Jack Adrian)
Artists: Carlos Pino, Dave Gibbons, Ian Kennedy, José Ferrér

Eccentric billionaire Howard Quartz saves droids Ro-Jaws and Hammerstein from the scrapyard, recruiting them for Ro-Busters - his squad of highly advanced rescue robots.

- Continued in 2000 AD.

=== Strontium Dog ===
Published: 13 May – 7 October 1978
Writers: John Wagner and Alan Grant (as T.B. Grover)
Artists: Carlos Ezquerra, Brendan McCarthy, Ian Gibson

In the 22nd century the Search and Destroy bounty hunters are unleashed to bring law to the stars. As they have been exposed to Strontium 90 fallout to give them mutant powers, and are nicknamed 'Strontium Dogs'. Johnny Alpha is one of the toughest.

- Continued in 2000 AD.

=== Timequake ===
Published: 13 May – 5 August 1978
Writers: Chris Lowder (as Jack Adrian), Ian Mennell
Artists: Ian Kennedy, John Cooper, Magallenes Salinan

Tramp steamer skipper James Blocker reluctantly recruited into Time Control, an agency which fought to prevent anyone tampering with time.

- Continued in 2000 AD.

== Story index ==
=== Regular issues ===
The cover date was actually the last day on which the issue was on sale, so the issue would have been published in the previous week.

Planet of the Damned
Issues: 1–10
Episodes: 10
Pages: 49
Script: Pat Mills
Art: Lalia 1; Pena 2, 5, 6, 8, 10; Azpiri 3, 4, 7, 9
Cover dates: 13 May 1978 to 15 July 1978

Timequake
First story
Issues: 1–3
Episodes: 3
Pages: 18
Script: Jack Adrian
Art: Ian Kennedy 1, 3; John Cooper 2
Dated: 13 May 1978 to 27 May 1978

Second story
Issues: 4–9
Episodes: 6
Pages: 36
Script: Jack Adrian
Art: Magellanes Salinas
Dated: 3/6/78 to 8/7/78

Third story
Issues: 10–13
Episodes: 4
Pages: 28
Script: Ian Mennell
Art: Magellanes Salinas
Dated: 15 July 1978 to 5 August 1978

Strontium Dog
Max Quirxx
Issues: 1–2
Episodes: 2
Pages: 10
Script: John Wagner
Art: Carlos Ezquerra
Dated: 13 May 1978 to 20 May 1978

Papa Por-ka
Issues: 3–5
Episodes: 3
Pages: 15
Script: John Wagner
Art: Carlos Ezquerra
Dated: 27 May 1978 to 10 June 1978

No Cure For Kansyr
Issues: 6–7
Episodes: 2
Pages: 10
Script: John Wagner
Art: Carlos Ezquerra
Dated: 17 June 1978 to 24 June 1978

Planet of the Dead
Issues: 8–10
Episodes: 3
Pages: 15
Script: John Wagner
Art: Carlos Ezquerra
Dated: 1 July 1978 to 15 July 1978

Two-Faced Terror!
Issues: 12–15
Episodes: 4
Pages: 23
Script: John Wagner
Art: Carlos Ezquerra
Dated: 29 July 1978 to 19 August 1978

Demon Maker
Issues: 17–19
Episodes: 3
Pages: 15
Script: John Wagner
Art: Brendan McCarthy 1; Ian Gibson 2–3
Dated: 2 September 1978 to 16 September 1978

The Ultimate Weapon
Issues: 21–22
Episodes: 2
Pages: 10
Script: John Wagner
Art: Carlos Ezquerra
Dated: 30 September 1978 to 7 October 78

Ro-Busters
First story
Issue: 1
Episodes: 1
Pages: 11
Script: Pat Mills
Art: Carlos Pino
Dated: 13 May 1978

Second story
Issues: 2–4
Episodes: 3
Pages: 18
Script: Pat Mills
Art: Carlos Pino
Dated: 20 May 1978 to 3 March 1978

Third story
Issues: 5–6
Episodes: 2
Pages: 10
Script: Bill Henry
Art: Ian Kennedy
Dated: 10 June 1978 to 17 June 1978

Fourth story
Issues: 7–12
Episodes: 6
Pages: 38
Script: Pat Mills
Art: Carlos Pino
Dated: 24 June 1978 to 29 July 1978

Fifth story
Issues: 13–14
Episodes: 2
Pages: 14
Script: V. Gross
Art: Ian Kennedy
Dated: 5/8/78 to 12/8/78

Sixth story
Issues: 15–19
Episodes: 5
Pages: 34
Script: Jack Adrian
Art: Carlos Pino 1, 3, 5; Ferrer 2, 4
Dated: 19 August 1978 to 16 September 1978

Seventh story
Issues: 20–22
Episodes: 3
Pages: 23
Script: Jack Adrian
Art: Ferrer 1, 3; Carlos Pino 2
Dated: 23 September 1978 to 7 October 1978

Mind Wars
Issues: 2–22
Episodes: 21
Pages: 129
Script: Alan Hebden
Art: Jesus Redondo 1–19, 21
(with Ian Gibson in episode 11);
Mike White 20
Dated: 20 May 1978 to 7 October 1978

Good Morning, Sheldon, I Love You!
Issue: 11
Episodes: 1
Pages: 6
Script: John Wagner
Art: Casanovas
Dated: 22 July 1978

Holocaust
Issues: 14–22
Episodes: 9
Pages: 69
Script: Alan Hebden
Art: Lalia 1–4; unknown artist 5, 8–9;
Madigllianes 6; Luis 7
Dated: 12/8/78 to 7/10/78

Earn Big Money While You Sleep!
Issue: 16
Episodes: 1
Pages: 6
Script: Alan Grant and John Wagner
Art: Casanovas
Dated: 26 August 1978

The Snatch
Issue: 17
Episodes: 1
Pages: 3
Script: Alan Hebden
Art: Pena
Dated: 2/9/78

Skirmish!
Issue: 20
Episodes: 1
Pages: 5
Script: Alan Hebden
Art: Pena
Dated: 23 September 1978

=== Summer special ===
Timequake
Pages: 9
Script: Patterson
Art: John Cooper

Ro-Busters
Pages: 10
Script: V. Gross
Art: G. Campion

Trash
Pages: 7
Script: D. Hooper
Art: Magano

Strontium Dog
Pages: 10
Script: Bill Henry
Art: Brendan McCarthy

Neutron Tide
Text story by Arthur C. Clarke
(Reprinted from Galaxy Science Fiction, May 1970)

== Spin-offs ==
- Starlord Special (1 edition, 1978)
- Starlord Annual (3 editions, 1980 to 1982)

== Collected editions ==
Title	ISBN	Publisher	Release date	Contents
Ro-Busters - The Complete Nuts and Bolts Volume One	9781781082621	Rebellion Developments	8 October 2015	Material from Starlord 13 May to 7 October 1978
Planet of the Damned & Death Planet	9781781084137	Rebellion Developments	10 March 2016	Material from Starlord 13 May to 15 July 1978 and 2000 AD 29 April to 24 June 1978
Strontium Dog - Search & Destroy	9781781087657	Rebellion Developments	12 November 2020	Material from Starlord 13 May to 7 October 1978, Starlord Summer Special 1978 and Starlord Annual 1980 to 1982.
The Complete Starlord Archival Collection - Volume 1	9781837868438 (Standard HB) 9781837868445 (webstore exclusive slipcase HB)	Rebellion Developments	19 November 2026	Collects Starlord starzines 1-12 and the Starlord Summer Special.
The Complete Starlord Archival Collection - Volume 2	TBA	Rebellion Developments	TBA	TBA
