= Kelvin Gosnell =

British comics writer and editor

- Notable works: The Stainless Steel Rat (comics adaptation)

Kelvin Gosnell is a British comics writer and editor. He was involved in the founding of the long-running comic 2000 AD in 1977, and was its second editor (1977–1978). He also edited Starlord (1978) and Tornado (1979).

== Biography ==
Gosnell was working as a sub-editor in IPC's competition department when Pat Mills asked if he would be interested in working on Action where he wrote Dredger and The Suicide Club. It was during this period that he read an article in the Evening Standard on the forthcoming sci-fi films in the late seventies and concluded that a science-fiction comic would complement the other genres the company was publishing. He suggested it to managing editor Jack Le Grand who turned it down, but mentioned it to Mills who suggested Gosnell write his ideas down in a memo, which Mills then passed on to John Sanders, head of the Youth Group in IPC. Sanders recalls Gosnell from those years:

Gosnell wrote lots of memos and Le Grand stuffed lots of them. I liked talking to Gosnell. He was a better ideas man than he was an editor, and there is always a place for someone like him. Gosnell was enormously noisy, enormously enthusiastic. He was a great guy to have around because he was always bubbling. Good ideas men often create dissent. You have to give them space to do that.

Sanders liked the ideas and passed it over to Mills to develop into a dummy issue to show to the IPC Board. After it was approved Mills brought Gosnell onto the staff in an official capacity as he recalls "I felt I owed Kelvin something for suggesting the idea in the first place, for which he hadn't been paid. I asked for him to be appointed editor designate. His input was valuable on strips like M.A.C.H. 1 and Dan Dare, because of his technical and science fiction knowledge." Kevin O'Neill, who was the art assistant in the early days, recalls the discussion between Mills and Gosnell "They had these ranting conversations, lots of swearing and cursing... Pat and Kelvin had a poisonous, venomous hatred of cosy editorial chats seen in the like of Valiant, that sort of kindly 'Uncle Editor' stuff. They wanted to do the opposite of that, an irreverent sort of editorial figure." Gosnell suggested either "an imperious intelligent alien or a computer" and it was the former that met with the most approval. They then bought a latex Neanderthal mask, added a pony tail, a brooch (for the Rosette of Sirius) and Gosnell put it on with a grey jumpsuit with silver stripes to complete the outfit. Tharg's alien language also largely came from Gosnell based on "invented swearwords from his schooldays."

Mills resigned after the first 16 issues, partly because of the interference from senior management, and handed the reins to Gosnell. Nick Landau moved over from Action to become Gosnell's chief sub-editor. Gosnell relied more on Landau when he had to oversee the launch of Starlord, and the eventual merger of the title into 2000 AD, which saw Landau swap places with Battle sub-editor Steve MacManus. Gosnell eventually resigned from his editorship over friction with managing editor Bob Bartholomew, during the time of the launch of Tornado (1979), with MacManus being promoted to editor. Gosnell would continue to work on Tornado as both editor and freelance writer during its short run.

On the writing front Gosnell is best known for his three adaptations of Harry Harrison's The Stainless Steel Rat, illustrated by Carlos Ezquerra and serialized in 1979, 1980 and 1984 in 2000 AD. He also co-wrote the 1977 series of Dan Dare for that weekly comic. Gosnell also worked for the Dutch comic strip weekly Eppo for a number of years, writing Storm, with art by Don Lawrence, and Rud Hart, art by Belgian artist Gilbert DeClerq. A two-page Wonder Woman text story in London Editions Magazines' Super-Heroes Annual for 1983 is also credited to him.

== Bibliography ==
Comics work includes:

- Dan Dare (in 2000 AD #1–11, 1977)
- Judge Dredd:
  - "Whitey" (with co-writers Peter Harris and Pat Mills, art by Mike McMahon, in 2000 AD #2, 1977)
  - "The New You" (with Mike McMahon, in 2000 AD #3, 1977)
  - "The Aggro Dome" (with co-writer Alan Grant, art by Mike McMahon, in 2000 AD #183, 1980)
  - "Mega-way Madness" (with co-writer Alan Grant, art by Ron Smith, in 2000 AD #189, 1980)
- Tharg's Future Shocks:
  - "Play Pool!" (with Kevin O'Neill, in 2000 AD #36, 1977)
  - "Trial and Error" (with Mike Dorey, in 2000 AD #204, 1981)
  - "The Collector" (with Ian Kennedy, in 2000 AD #210, 1981)
  - "Long Live the Queen" (with Eric Bradbury, in 2000 AD #212, 1981)
  - "Bloomin' Cold" (with Garry Leach, in 2000 AD #215, 1981)
  - "'Ang About" (with Eric Bradbury, in 2000 AD #221, 1981)
  - "Diversion" (with Colin Wilson, in 2000 AD #222, 1981)
  - "The Machine" (with Jesus Redondo, in 2000 AD #224, 1981)
  - "Seeing Is Believing" (with Colin Wilson, in 2000 AD #225, 1981)
  - "Giant Leap" (with Jesus Redondo, in 2000 AD #230, 1981)
  - "Space to Let" (with Anthony Jozwiak, in 2000 AD #236, 1981)
  - "Love Thy Neighbour" (with Jesus Redondo, in 2000 AD #242, 1981)
  - "Horn of Plenty!" (with John Higgins, in 2000 AD #248, 1982)
- Project Overkill (with Ian Gibson and Jesus Redondo, in 2000 AD #119–126, 1979)
- Blackhawk (with co-writer Alan Grant and art by Massimo Belardinelli, in 2000 AD #127, 1979)
- The Stainless Steel Rat (with Carlos Ezquerra, tpb, 208 pages, July 2010, ISBN 1-906735-51-4):
  - The Stainless Steel Rat (in 2000 AD #140–151, 1979–1980)
  - The Stainless Steel Rat Saves the World (in 2000 AD #166–177, 1980)
  - The Stainless Steel Rat for President (in 2000 AD #393–404, 1984–1985)
- Ro-Jaws' Robo-Tale: "Damian, Child of Tomorrow" (with co-writer Prigmore and art by Mike White, in 2000 AD #147, 1980)
- Storm (with Don Lawrence, Eppo #27–52, 1980–1981, collected in Storm Volume 4, March 2005, ISBN 90-73508-68-1):
  - "The Legend of Yggdrasil/De Legende van Yggdrasi"
  - "City of the Damned/Stad der Verdoemden"
- Joe Black (with John Higgins):
  - "Joe Black's Tall Tale!" (in 2000 AD #241, 1981)
  - "The Hume Factor" (in 2000 AD #252, 1982)
  - "Joe Black's Big Bunco" (in 2000 AD #256, 1982)
- The Terminal Man (with Oliver Frey, in CRASH, 12 4-page episodes, 1984).

== Notes ==
Preceded by Pat Mills	2000 AD editor 1977–1979	Succeeded by Steve MacManus
