= Steve MacManus =

British comic writer and editor (born 1953)

- Born: 1953 (age 72–73) London, England
- Areas: Writer, editor
- Pseudonym: Ian Rogan
- Notable works: 2000 AD; Crisis; Judge Dredd Megazine; Batman/Judge Dredd: Judgment on Gotham; Sonic the Comic

Steve MacManus (sometimes credited as Ian Rogan; born 1953) is a British comic writer and editor, particularly known for his work at 2000 AD.

== Biography ==
Born in London and educated in Devon, MacManus joined IPC in 1973, aged 20, as a sub-editor on the boys' weekly comic Valiant, until 1975 when he moved to Battle Picture Weekly under editor David Hunt. While working on Battle he also freelanced on Action, appearing as the title's mascot "Action Man", who performed and wrote up stunts and activities such as exploring London's sewers or flying a hot air balloon, as well as writing "The Running Man", "Sport's Not For Losers", and episodes of "Dredger".

In 1978 he was taken off Battle to sub for Kelvin Gosnell on a new science fiction title, Starlord. When it was cancelled later the same year, he became Gosnell's sub on 2000 AD, replacing Nick Landau who was moved to Battle. He wrote scripts for "M.A.C.H. 1", and was the main writer for its spin-off "M.A.C.H. Zero", as well as contributing episodes of "The V.C.s", and also wrote "The Lawless Touch" for another of Gosnell's titles, Tornado.

In 1979 he was promoted to editor of 2000 AD, a job he held until 1986. This period is widely regarded as the title's "golden age", during which John Wagner, Alan Grant, Pat Mills and Alan Moore produced some of their best work, and new talents like Peter Milligan and Grant Morrison joined the line-up. MacManus had a hand in the creation of one of the comic's most enduring characters, "Rogue Trooper", alongside writer Gerry Finley-Day and artist Dave Gibbons, and he co-wrote the character with Simon Geller in 1986.

His one-off story "Shok!", created with Kevin O'Neill for the 1981 Judge Dredd Annual, was the basis of Richard Stanley's 1990 film Hardware. Only after a court case, which Stanley lost, were the two given writing credits on the film. Hardware is now considered the first 2000 AD story to be adapted into film.

MacManus gave up editing 2000 AD in December 1986. In the following year he became managing editor of the 2000 AD Group, during which time he launched Crisis, a politically aware comic which introduced Garth Ennis, John Smith, Sean Phillips and Duncan Fegredo, among others. After IPC's comics division became Fleetway, he quit Crisis after 50 issues following problems with censorship under new owner Robert Maxwell. He married in 1990.

In the early 1990s he edited the first twelve issues of the Judge Dredd Megazine, and co-edited the Batman/Judge Dredd crossover Judgement on Gotham with DC Comics' Denny O'Neil. Other titles he oversaw in the 2000 AD Group included Revolver and Dice Man. In 1995 he became Managing Editor of the Pre-School Group of Fleetway's new owners Egmont, editing Sonic the Comic and overseeing titles such as Toxic and Ben 10.

In 1997 he returned to 2000 AD to write their 3000 AD twentieth anniversary special with David Bishop. After Egmont sold 2000 AD to Rebellion Developments in 2000, MacManus moved out of comics and into Egmont's magazine editorial. He announced he was stepping down in 2011.

In 2016 Rebellion published his memoirs, The Mighty One: My Life Inside the Nerve Centre, with a limited edition hardcover and a standard paperback edition.

== Bibliography ==
=== Comic strips ===
- The Running Man (with Horacio Lalia, Mike White, in Action, 14 February – 12 June 1976).
- Sport's Not For Losers (with Dudley L. Wynn, in Action, 14 February – 1 May 1976).
- M.A.C.H. 1:
  - "Chinese Formula" (with Kato, in 2000 AD No. 14, 1977).
  - "Tokyo" (with Lopez, in 2000 AD No. 20, 1977).
  - "The Death Trumpet" (with Marzal Canos, in 2000 AD No. 26, 1977).
  - "M.A.C.H. Zero" (with Ramon Sola, in 2000 AD #43–46, 1977–1978).
  - "The Dolphin Tapes" (with Jesus Redondo (1–2), Montero (3–4), in 2000 AD #54–57, 1978).
- M.A.C.H. Zero:
  - "Cousin George " (with Mike Donaldson (1–2, 4, 6–8), Ramon Sola (3, 5), in 2000 AD #65–72, 1978).
  - "The Suit" (with Montero, in 2000 AD #73–75, 1978).
  - "M.A.C.H. Zero" (with Mike Dorey, in 2000 AD #162–165, 1980).
- Strontium Dog: "Assault on Trigol 3" (with Rob Moran, in 2000 AD Sci-Fi Special 1979).
- The Lawless Touch: "The Dogs of Death" (with Mike White, in Tornado #20–22, 1979).
- The V.C.s: "The VCs" (with Cam Kennedy, in 2000 AD No. 145, 1979).
- One-Off:
  - "Shok!" (with co-writer and artist Kevin O'Neill, in Judge Dredd Annual 1981, 1980) .
  - "Last Thought" (with John Higgins, in 2000 AD No. 202, 1981).
- Tharg's Future Shocks: "Say 'Aaaaagh!'" (with Dave Wyatt, in 2000 AD No. 493, 1986).
- Rogue Trooper:
  - "The War of Words" (with Robin Smith, in 2000 AD Annual 1985, 1984).
  - "M For Murder" credited as "Rogan" (with art by Cam Kennedy, in 2000 AD #384-386, 1984).
  - "The Hit Man" (with co-writer Simon Geller and artist Steve Dillon, in 2000 AD #495–499, 1986).
- Tharg the Mighty: "The Last Laugh" (with Carlos Ezquerra, in 2000 AD Winter Special 1990).
- B.L.A.I.R. 1: "B.L.A.I.R. 1" (with co-writer David Bishop and artist Simon Davis, in supplement to 2000 AD #1034, 1997).
- Dan Dare: "Dan Dare 3000 AD" (with co-writer David Bishop and artist Kev Walker, in supplement to 2000 AD #1034, 1997).
- Flesh: "Flesh 3000 AD" (with co-writer David Bishop and artist Carl Critchlow, in supplement to 2000 AD #1034, 1997).
- Harlem Heroes: "Hike Harlem Heroes" (with co-writer David Bishop and artist Jason Brashill, in supplement to 2000 AD #1034, 1997).
- Invasion: "Invasion! 3000 AD" (with co-writer David Bishop and artist Henry Flint, in supplement to 2000 AD #1034, 1997).
- Blazer! (2019)

=== Books ===
- The Mighty One: My Life Inside the Nerve Centre (Rebellion, 2016). ISBN 978-1-78108-475-5.
- Elmsworld. My Life At Dartington Hall School 1963-1971 (eBook Publication, 2017). ISBN 978-1-97331-574-2.

== Notes ==
Preceded by Kelvin Gosnell	2000 AD editor 1979–1987	Succeeded by Richard Burton
Preceded by —	Judge Dredd Megazine editor 1990–1991	Succeeded by David Bishop
