= Kevin O'Neill (comics) =

English illustrator (1953–2022)

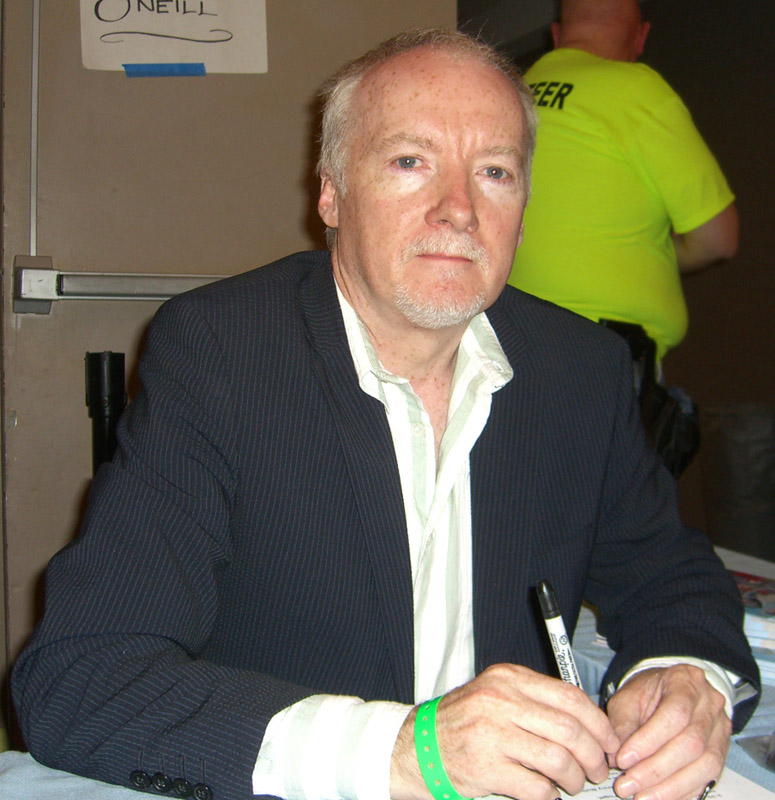
- O'Neill in 2009
- Born: 22 August 1953 London, England
- Died: 3 November 2022 (aged 69) London, England
- Area: Artist
- Notable works: Nemesis the Warlock; Marshal Law; The League of Extraordinary Gentlemen
- Awards: 3 Harvey Awards; 2 Eisner Awards; Eagle Award; Bram Stoker Award

Kevin O'Neill (22 August 1953 – 3 November 2022) was an English comic book illustrator who was the co-creator of Nemesis the Warlock, Marshal Law (both with writer Pat Mills), and The League of Extraordinary Gentlemen (with Alan Moore).

== Early life ==
O'Neill was born in London on 22 August 1953, the son of a contractor father and a homemaker mother.

== Career ==
=== Early career ===
O'Neill began working for the publishing company IPC at the age of 16 as an office boy for Buster, which was a children's humour title. In 1972 he published two issues of the fanzine World of Comics. In 1975 he started publishing, as a personal side project, the fanzine Just Imagine: The Journal of Film and Television Special Effects which lasted five regular issues and one special issue through 1978. By 1976 he was working as a colourist on Disney comics reprints and British children's comics such as Monster Fun and Whizzer and Chips.

Tired of working on children's humour titles, he heard that a new science fiction title was being put together at IPC and went to see Pat Mills and asked to be transferred to the new comic which was to be called 2000 AD.

=== 2000 AD ===
O'Neill initially provided art for pin-ups and covers, including the centre image of Tharg on the cover of the first issue of 2000AD, bodging and introducing creator credits. After a period of being nurtured by Mills, he eventually started branching out drawing short Tharg the Mighty strips, Future Shocks and various humorous short stories. In issue 88 of 2000AD O'Neill started work on Ro-Busters, his first major ongoing strip for the title and the first of what would become a long series of collaborations with writer Pat Mills. O'Neill's quirky and unusual work on Ro-Busters proved popular and helped establish him as a major 2000AD creator.

Mills and O'Neill's next major work was a one-off story called Terror Tube in issue 167 which was said to be inspired by the song "Going Underground" by The Jam. However the story was a reaction against IPC objecting to a long chase sequence in Ro-Busters, so the pair created a six-page story which consisted entirely of an extended chase sequence between the hordes of the villainous Torquemada and a mysterious character called Nemesis.

The story proved popular and the pair followed Terror Tube up with a two part story featuring Nemesis called Killer Watt. This proved to be even more popular and by now O'Neill's grotesque style was winning over more and more fans who also wanted to see more of Nemesis. In issue 222 they would get their wish with the first book of an ongoing Nemesis the Warlock series. The strip would eventually rival Judge Dredd in terms of popularity but O'Neill's art would get him into trouble with IPC's censors who considered his work too violent and disturbing. However O'Neill was one of 2000AD's most popular artists and would not only continue working on Nemesis the Warlock, but would provide art for The ABC Warriors and even Judge Dredd.

It was with Nemesis the Warlock that O'Neill would spend most of his time working on for much of the early 1980s, but O'Neill was suffering from financial difficulties and decided to take offers of work from DC Comics. This meant stopping work upon Nemesis and becoming freelance, although he would return for the occasional one-off episode of Nemesis and provide other work for 2000AD.

The story "Shok!" (created with Steve MacManus for Judge Dredd Annual 1981) was involved in controversy when it was realised that it was the basis of Richard Stanley's 1990 film Hardware. Only after a court case, which Stanley lost, were the two given writing credits on the film. Hardware is now considered the first 2000 AD story to be adapted into film.

=== DC Comics and the Comics Code Authority ===
O'Neill had drawn several fill-in issues and short stories for titles such as The Omega Men, but his first major work for DC was a story written by Alan Moore for the Tales of the Green Lantern Corps Annual No. 2 in 1986. The Comics Code Authority objected to O'Neill's art. When DC asked what was wrong and if anything could be changed (the story featured scenes of a crucifixion) to get approval, the Authority replied that it was O'Neill's entire style they found objectionable. DC pointed out that his art had been passed previously but the Authority stuck by their decision. DC decided to print the comic without the Comics Code Authority stamp. The short story has established continuity points in the DC Universe on which the 2009 storyline "Blackest Night" was based.

1986 also saw the release of the graphic novel Metalzoic by the team of Mills and O'Neill. This was highly acclaimed and one of the first creator owned stories published by DC. The story was reprinted in 2000AD later the same year.

=== Marshal Law ===
Mills and O'Neill created a six issue mini-series for Epic Comics called Marshal Law which would be their take on superheroes. Although the series sold well, Epic received several complaints about the art, as well as forcing Mills and O'Neill to change the characters in the Marshal Law Takes Manhattan one-shot from the familiar Marvel Comics characters as they intended to use to thinly disguised duplicates of heroes such as Captain America, Spider-Man and The Punisher.

The pair decided to take Marshal Law from Epic to the newly formed Apocalypse Comics for a one-off special (featuring a satire on the Batman character) before launching a new weekly comic titled Toxic! with Marshal Law as its flagship character. Toxic! was an attempt to take on and even rival 2000AD but although the title initially sold well, it suffered from stories missing issues, including Marshal Law which was left incomplete during a story. After 31 issues the title was cancelled and Apocalypse Comics went bankrupt shortly afterward.

After this Mills and O'Neill took Marshal Law to Dark Horse Comics where the story started in Toxic! was completed. Dark Horse also published several mini-series featuring Marshal Law, and Epic Comics published a two issue series pitting the character against Clive Barker's Pinhead character. The character then appeared on the Cool Beans World website in a series of illustrated novellas, but since the site closed in 2002, Marshal Law has been in limbo since, with the exception of one appearance in 2000AD. In 2008, Top Shelf Productions announced plans to publish a complete Marshal Law Omnibus in 2009.

=== The League of Extraordinary Gentlemen ===
In 1999 O'Neill teamed up with Alan Moore for a six issue series for America's Best Comics called The League of Extraordinary Gentlemen. This teamed up various characters in Victorian literature such as Captain Nemo, Allan Quatermain and Dr. Jekyll. The title was a huge success and was followed by a second six issue series which again proved successful but issue five was recalled by Paul Levitz due to a real advert for a Victorian "Marvel Douche" due to him not wishing to offend Marvel Comics.

The film version of League of Extraordinary Gentlemen was released in 2003. The film was critically mauled and both Moore and O'Neill disowned it. After a legal dispute where it was alleged the film was plagiarised by 20th Century Fox and that Fox solicited the idea for Moore and O'Neill's comic as a smokescreen, the pair have taken the third volume of League of Extraordinary Gentlemen and its Nemo spinoffs to Knockabout Comics and Top Shelf Productions due both to Moore feeling insulted by the lack of support from 20th Century Fox and DC comics in the lawsuit, and also Warner Bros.' failure to retract false claims of Moore's endorsement of the V for Vendetta film adaptation.

=== Later work ===
O'Neill drew the final Nemesis the Warlock story in the special Prog 2000 millennium edition of 2000AD in 1999. Apart from this and his work on League of Extraordinary Gentlemen, he worked on short strips for Negative Burn published by Caliber Comics.

The DVD of the 2003 documentary feature film The Mindscape of Alan Moore contains an exclusive bonus interview with Kevin O'Neill, elaborately detailing the collaboration with Alan Moore. O'Neill talks about League of Extraordinary Gentlemen: Century, his run-ins with the censors and the status of the Marshal Law movie in an interview with The Times.

His 2009 work includes The League of Extraordinary Gentlemen: Century, the third League limited series, the first issue of which was released in May 2009.

O'Neill was a contributor to Alan Moore's bi-monthly magazine, Dodgem Logic, which ran from January 2010 to April 2011.

In 2017 he co-wrote the novel Serial Killer with Pat Mills.

In a March 2021 podcast O'Neill revealed that he had completed eight pages of comics for Alan Moore's Moon and Serpent Bumper Book of Magic for Top Shelf, as well as a cover illustration and design work for the Cinema Purgatorio collected edition.

== Death ==
O'Neill died of cancer in London on 3 November 2022. No information was made public about his survivors.

== Bibliography ==
=== Comics ===
- Tharg's Future Shocks:
  - "Wings" (script and art, in 2000 AD #28, 1977)
  - "Play Pool!" (with Kelvin Gosnell, in 2000 AD #36, 1977)
- Bonjo from Beyond the Stars (script and art, in 2000 AD #41–50, 1977)
- M.A.C.H.0: "Cyborg Express" (with Henry Miller, in 2000AD Sci-Fi Special 1978)
- Ro-Busters (with Pat Mills, collected in The Complete Ro-Busters, 336 pages, Rebellion, November 2008, ISBN 1-905437-82-X):
  - "Hammerstein's War Memoirs" (in 2000 AD #88, 90, 1978)
  - "Fall & Rise of Ro-Jaws and Hammerstein" (in 2000 AD #103–115, 1979)
- ABC Warriors (with Pat Mills, collected in The Meknificent Seven, 136 pages, Rebellion, 2009, ISBN 978-1-906735-08-1):
  - "ABC Warriors" (in 2000 AD #119, 1979)
  - "The Order of Knights Martial" (in 2000 AD #123–124, 1979)
- Captain Klep (in occasional issues of 2000 AD between #127–155, 1979–1980)
- Ro-Jaws' Robo-Tales: "The Inside Story" (with Pat Mills, in 2000 AD #144, 1979)
- Walter's Robo-Tales: "Shok!" (co-author and artist, with writer Steve MacManus, in Judge Dredd Annual 1981, 1980)
- Dash Decent (with Dave Angus, in 2000 AD #178–198, 1980–1981)
- Nemesis the Warlock (by Pat Mills):
  - Volume 1 (2007, ISBN 1-905437-11-0) collects:
    - "Terror Tube" (in 2000 AD #167, 1980)
    - "Killer Watt" (in 2000 AD #178–179, 1980)
    - "The Sword Sinister" (in 1981 Sci-Fi Special)
    - "The World of Termight (Book 1)" (in 2000 AD #222–244, 1981)
    - "The Secret Life of the Blitzspear" (in 2000 AD Annual 1983, 1982)
    - "The World of Nemesis (Book 3)" (in 2000 AD #335–349, 1983)
    - "The Gothic Empire (Book 4)" (first two episodes only, in 2000 AD #387–388, 1984)
  - Volume 2 (August 2007, ISBN 1-905437-36-6) collects:
    - "A Day in the Death of Torquemada" (in 2000 AD Annual 1984, 1983)
    - "The Secret Life of the Blitzspear" (in 2000 AD Annual 1984, 1983)
    - "Ego Trip" (in 2000 AD #430, 1985)
    - "The Torture Tube" (in Dice Man #1, 1986)
    - "Torquemada the God" (in 2000 AD #520–524, 1987)
    - Torquemada: "Torquemada's Second Honeymoon" (with Pat Mills, in 2000 AD Annual 1988, 1987)
  - Volume 3 (December 2007, ISBN 1-905437-36-6) collects:
    - "Book X: The Final Conflict" (final episode, in 2000 AD Prog 2000, 1999)
  - "The Tomb of Torquemada" (in Poster Prog Nemesis #1, 1994)
  - "Tubular Hells" (in 2000 AD #2000, 2016)
- Green Lantern #182–183, 189–190 (1984–1985)
- Omega Men #24, 26, Annual #2 (1985)
- Batman Annual #9 (1985)
- DC Universe: The Stories of Alan Moore (with Alan Moore, trade paperback, 2003, Titan, ISBN 1-84576-257-6, DC, ISBN 1-4012-0927-0) collects:
  - Omega Men #26: "Brief Lives" (DC, 1985)
  - Tales of the Green Lantern Corps Annual #2: "Tygers" (DC, 1986)
- Metalzoic (with Pat Mills, DC Graphic Novel, 1986, ISBN 0-930289-10-2)
  - Reprinted in serial form in 2000 AD, #483–492
- Judge Dredd (with John Wagner/Alan Grant except where otherwise indicated):
  - "Ryan's Revenge" (writer unknown, in Dan Dare Annual 1979)
  - "The Law According to Dredd" (in 2000 AD #474–475, 1986)
  - "Varks" (in 2000 AD #503, 1986)
  - "What If Judges Did Ads?" (in 2000 AD #521, 1987)
- Critical Mass #1–2 (1990)
- Clive Barker's Hellraiser #2 (1990)
- Batman: Legends of the Dark Knight #38 (1992)
- Lobo Convention Special (1993)
- Lobo #21, Annual #2 (1994–1995)
- Batman: Mitefall (1995)
- Lobo: Bounty Hunting for Fun and Profit (1995)
- Adventure Comics 80-Page Giant #1 (1998)
- Marshal Law (with Pat Mills):
  - Fear and Loathing (collects Marshal Law #1-6, Epic Comics, 1990, ISBN 0-87135-676-7)
  - Blood Sweat and Tears (collects Kingdom of the Blind, Hateful Dead, and Super Babylon, Dark Horse, 1993, ISBN 1-878574-95-7).
  - Fear and Loathing (collects Marshal Law #1-6 Titan, 2002, ISBN 1-84023-452-0)
  - Blood, Sweat and Fears (collects Kingdom of the Blind, Hateful Dead, and Super Babylon, Titan Books, 2003, ISBN 1-84023-526-8)
  - Fear Asylum (collects Takes Manhattan, Secret Tribunal, and vs The Mask, Titan Books, 2003, ISBN 1-84023-699-X)
  - The Day of the Dead (an illustrated novella, Titan Books, 2004, ISBN 1-84023-636-1)
  - Cloak of Evil (an illustrated novella, Titan Books, 2006, ISBN 1-84023-683-3)
- "The Abyss Also Grasps" (with writer Aldyth Beltane, in Negative Burn No. 31, Caliber Comics, January 1996, collected in Negative Burn: The Best from 1993–1998, Desperado Publishing, January 2005, ISBN 1-58240-452-6)
- The League of Extraordinary Gentlemen (with Alan Moore):
  - Volume I (6-issue limited series, DC Comics/Wildstorm/ABC, 1999–2000, collected hardback edition, 2001, ISBN 1-56389-665-6, paperback, 2002, ISBN 1-56389-858-6)
  - Volume II (DC Comics/Wildstorm/ABC, 6-issue limited series, 2002–2003, collected hardback edition, 2003, ISBN 1-4012-0117-2, paperback, 2004, ISBN 1-4012-0118-0)
  - Black Dossier (DC Comics/Wildstorm/ABC, graphic novel, hardback, November 2007, ISBN 1-4012-0306-X)
  - Volume III: Century (3-issue graphic novel mini-series, ongoing):
    - 1910 (80 pages, Top Shelf Productions, April 2009, ISBN 1-60309-000-2, Knockabout Comics, May 2009, ISBN 0-86166-160-5)
  - The League of Extraordinary Gentlemen: Nemo Trilogy
  - Volume IV: The Tempest
- Bonjo from Beyond the Stars: "Solids in the Bile Tube" (script by Garth Ennis, in 2000 AD #2312, December 2022)

=== Novels ===
- Serial Killer (with co-author Pat Mills, Millsverse Books, 2017, ISBN 978-0-9956612-0-2)
