= 2000 AD (comics) =

British comic magazine

- Cover of the first issue of 2000 AD, 26 February 1977

Publication information
- Publisher: Formerly; IPC Magazines; Fleetway Publications; Currently; Rebellion Developments
- Schedule: Weekly
- Format: Ongoing series
- Genre: Action/adventure, science fiction
- Publication date: 26 February 1977 to present
- No. of issues: 2,500 regular issues, plus 16 irregularly-numbered issues, (Note: In the years 1999 to 2014, the last issue of the year was numbered after the New Year. The issue numbers 2000 to 2015 were therefore duplicated in the year 2016. (The actual 2,000th weekly issue was the one numbered 1984.)) 78 special issues and 38 annuals (as of September 2026)
- Main character(s): Judge Dredd, Tharg the Mighty, Strontium Dog, Rogue Trooper, Nikolai Dante, Sláine, The Ballad of Halo Jones, ABC Warriors, Nemesis the Warlock

Creative team
- Created by: Kelvin Gosnell, Pat Mills, John Wagner
- Written by: John Wagner, Alan Grant, Pat Mills, Grant Morrison, Mark Millar, Ian Edginton, Alan Moore
- Artist(s): Mike McMahon, Carlos Ezquerra, Dave Gibbons, Massimo Belardinelli, Jock, Frank Quitely, Frazer Irving, Dom Reardon, Ian Gibson, Cam Kennedy, Simon Bisley, Kevin O'Neill, Ron Smith

2000 AD is a weekly British science fiction-oriented comic magazine. As a comics anthology it serialises stories in each issue (known as "progs") (Note: Prog: short for "programme" as issues are supposedly beamed directly to the printed page.) and was first published by IPC Magazines in 1977, the first issue dated 26 February. (Note: The cover date was actually the last day on which the issue was on sale, so the issue would have been published in the previous week.) Since 2000, it has been published by Rebellion Developments.

2000 AD is most noted for its Judge Dredd stories, and has been contributed to by a number of artists and writers who became renowned in the field internationally, such as Alan Moore, Dave Gibbons, Grant Morrison, Brian Bolland, Mike McMahon, John Wagner, Alan Grant and Garth Ennis. Other series in 2000 AD include Rogue Trooper, Sláine, The Ballad of Halo Jones, Strontium Dog, ABC Warriors, Nemesis the Warlock and Nikolai Dante.

== History ==
2000 AD was initially published by IPC Magazines. IPC then shifted the title to its Fleetway comics subsidiary, which was sold to Robert Maxwell in 1987 and then to Egmont UK in 1991. Fleetway continued to produce the title until 2000, when it was bought by Rebellion Developments.

=== 1970s ===
==== Pre-publication ====
In December 1975, Kelvin Gosnell, a sub-editor at IPC Magazines, read an article in the London Evening Standard about a wave of forthcoming science fiction films, and suggested that the company might get on the bandwagon by launching a science fiction comic. IPC publisher John Sanders asked Pat Mills, a freelance writer and editor who had created Battle Picture Weekly and Action, to develop it. Mills brought fellow freelancer John Wagner on board as script adviser and the pair began to develop characters. The then-futuristic name 2000 AD was chosen by John Sanders, as no-one involved expected the comic to last that long. The original logo and overall look of the comic were designed by art assistant Doug Church.

IPC owned the rights to Dan Dare, and Mills decided to revive the character to add immediate public recognition for the title. Paul DeSavery, who owned Dare's film rights, offered to buy the new comic and give Mills and Wagner more creative control and a greater financial stake. The deal fell through, however.

===== Judge Dredd =====
Mills' experiences with Battle and Action in particular had taught him that readers responded to his anti-authoritarian attitudes. Wagner, who had written a Dirty Harry-inspired tough cop called One-Eyed Jack for Valiant, saw that readers also responded to authority figures, and developed a character that took the concept to its logical extreme, imagining an ultra-violent lawman patrolling a future New York with the power to arrest, sentence, and if required execute criminals on the spot. This would allow the new comic to be as violent as Action had been – a comic which had generated much controversy – but without attracting criticism, because the violence would be committed by an officer of the law. As Sanders put it, "The formula was simple: violence on the side of justice ... Dredd could be as violent as hell, and no one could say a thing."

Meanwhile, Mills had developed a horror strip, inspired by the novels of Dennis Wheatley, about a hanging judge, called Judge Dread (after the reggae and ska artist of the same name). The idea was abandoned as unsuitable for the new comic, but the name, with a little modification, was adopted by Wagner for his ultimate lawman.

The task of visualising the newly named Judge Dredd was given to Carlos Ezquerra, a Spanish artist who had previously worked with Mills on Battle, on a strip called Major Eazy. Wagner gave Ezquerra an advertisement for the film Death Race 2000, showing the character Frankenstein clad in black leather, as a suggestion for what the character should look like. Ezquerra elaborated on this greatly, adding body-armour, zips and chains, which Wagner originally thought over the top. Wagner's initial script was rewritten by Mills and drawn up by Ezquerra, but when the art came back a rethink was necessary. The hardware and cityscapes Ezquerra had drawn were far more futuristic than the near-future setting originally intended, and Mills decided to run with it and set the strip further into the future. By this stage, however, Wagner and Ezquerra had both quit.

Mills was reluctant to lose Judge Dredd, and farmed the strip out to a variety of freelance writers, hoping to develop it further. Their scripts were given to a variety of artists as Mills tried to find a strip which would make a good introduction to the character, all of which meant that Dredd would not be ready for the first issue. The story chosen was one written by freelancer Peter Harris, (Note: Harris also wrote two Future Shocks and one episode of M.A.C.H. One.) extensively rewritten by Mills and including an idea suggested by Kelvin Gosnell, and drawn by newcomer Mike McMahon. The strip debuted in prog 2, dated 5 March 1977.

==== The opening line-up ====
Dan Dare was extensively revamped to make it more futuristic. In the new stories he had been put into suspended animation and revived in the year 2177. Several artists were tried out before Mills settled on Italian artist Massimo Belardinelli, whose imaginative, hallucinatory work was fantastic at visualising aliens, although perhaps less satisfying on the hero himself. The scripts were endlessly rewritten in an attempt to make the series work, but few Dan Dare fans remember this version of the character fondly. Belardinelli and Gibbons later switched strips, with Gibbons drawing Dan Dare and Belardinelli drawing the Harlem Heroes sequel Inferno. When Gibbons took over Dan Dare in prog 28 the strip was refashioned as a Star Trek-style space opera.

Mills had also created Harlem Heroes, about the future sport of aeroball, a futuristic, violent version of basketball with jet-packs. Similar future sport series had been a fixture of Action, and the similarly themed film Rollerball had been released the previous year. Wanting to give the new comic a distinctive look, Mills wanted to use European artists, but the work turned in on Harlem Heroes by Trigo was disappointing. Veteran British artists Ron Turner and Barrie Mitchell were tried out, but the newcomer Dave Gibbons won the editor over with his dynamic, American-influenced drawings and got the job. Mills wrote the first five episodes before handing the strip to Roy of the Rovers writer Tom Tully.

The other opening strips were M.A.C.H. 1, a super-powered secret agent inspired by The Six Million Dollar Man; Invasion!, about a "Volgan" (thinly disguised and originally billed as Soviet, but changed before printing to a "neutral" antagonist) invasion of the United Kingdom opposed by tough London lorry driver turned guerrilla fighter Bill Savage; and Flesh, a strip about time-travelling cowboys farming dinosaurs for their meat.

After 16 issues, Mills quit as editor and handed the reins to Kelvin Gosnell, whose idea the comic had been in the first place.

==== Early years ====
Wagner returned to write Judge Dredd, starting in prog 9. His "Robot Wars" storyline was drawn by a rotating team of artists, including McMahon, Ezquerra, Turner and Ian Gibson, and marked the point where Dredd became the most popular character in the comic, a position he has rarely relinquished. Dredd's city, which now covered most of the east coast of North America, became known as Mega-City One. Dredd had also been unmasked in issue 8 in a story drawn by Massimo Belardinelli, but the decision was made to make out that Dredd's face had been scarred and the panel had a "censored" banner slapped on it. After this, there were no further attempts to show Dredd's face again.

A new story format was introduced in prog 25 – Tharg's Future Shocks, one-off twist-in-the-tale stories devised by writer Steve Moore. 2000 AD still uses this format as filler and to try out new talent.

Wagner introduced a new character, Robo-Hunter, in 1978. The hero, Sam Slade, was a private detective-type character specialising in robot-related cases. José Ferrer was the original artist, but the editorial team were not happy with his work and quickly replaced him with Ian Gibson, who redrew parts of Ferrer's episodes before taking over himself. Gibson's imaginative, cartoony art helped drive the series' style from hard-boiled detective to surreal comedy. As the series continued Sam was joined by an idiot kit-built robot assistant, Hoagy, and after a crack-down on smoking in IPC comics, a Cuban robot cigar, Stogie, designed to help him cut down on nicotine.

Other ongoing strips included The Visible Man, detailing the misfortunes of Frank Hart, a man whose skin had been made transparent due to exposure to nuclear waste, and Shako, (which followed the same formula as Hook Jaw from Action but with less success) the story of a polar bear pursued by the Army because it had swallowed a secret capsule.

M.A.C.H. 1 was killed off in 1978 but a spin-off, M.A.C.H. Zero, continued into the 1980s. Flesh had a sequel in 1978, set on the prehistoric oceans, and Bill Savage appeared again in a prequel, Disaster 1990, in which a nuclear explosion at the north pole had melted the polar ice-cap and flooded Britain.

In 1977 2000 AD launched the annual 48-page Summer Special, including a full-length M.A.C.H. Zero story drawn by O'Neill. The yearly hardcover annual also started in 1977 (cover dated 1978) and would continue till 1990 (dated 1991).

Pat Mills took over writing Dredd for a six-month "epic" called "The Cursed Earth", inspired by Roger Zelazny's Damnation Alley, which took the future lawman out of the city on a humanitarian trek across the radioactive wasteland between the Mega-Cities. McMahon drew the bulk of the stories, with occasional episodes drawn by Brian Bolland.

Steve MacManus took over from Gosnell as editor in 1978, starting with prog 86, dated 14 October. In that issue 2000 AD merged with Starlord, a second science fiction comic which had been launched by IPC earlier that year. As Gosnell was editor of Starlord and 2000 AD at the same time, 2000 AD sub-editor Nick Landau largely edited the latter comic himself during this time. Starlord was cancelled after only 22 issues and merged into 2000 AD from prog 86. Two Starlord strips strengthened 2000 AD's line-up: Strontium Dog, a mutant bounty hunter created by Wagner and Ezquerra, and Ro-Busters, a robot disaster squad created by Mills. Ro-Busters gave O'Neill the chance to spread his artistic wings and led to the popular spin-off ABC Warriors. Strontium Dog and ABC Warriors continued to feature in 2000 AD for the next 40 years. (A third Starlord series, Timequake, only lasted for four episodes and was not renewed.) Dan Dare was suspended while "The Cursed Earth" was finished in time for the merger. Wagner returned to Dredd following the merger to write "The Day the Law Died", another six-month epic in which Mega-City One was taken over by the insane Chief Judge Cal, based on the Roman emperor Caligula.

Another cancelled title, Tornado, was merged with 2000 AD a few months later from prog 127, dated 25th August, 1979. Tornado contributed three stories to 2000 AD: Blackhawk, an historical adventure series about a Nubian slave in the Roman Empire which took a science-fictional turn in 2000 AD with him becoming a gladiator in an alien world; The Mind of Wolfie Smith, a coming of age/psychic story of a runaway teenager, and Captain Klep, a single-page superhero parody. These stories, unlike Starlord's, did not continue for very long. The last issue titled 2000 AD and Tornado was prog 177, dated 13 September 1980.

2000 AD featured an adaptation of Harry Harrison's novel The Stainless Steel Rat, written by Gosnell and drawn by Ezquerra, beginning in November 1979. Adaptations of two of Harrison's sequels, The Stainless Steel Rat Saves the World and The Stainless Steel Rat for President, would follow later. The appearance of the main character, galactic thief "Slippery" Jim DiGriz, was based on James Coburn, evidently a favourite of Ezquerra's; Coburn was also the inspiration for Major Eazy, which Ezquerra drew in Battle, as well as Cursed Earth Koburn, a Dredd-universe reworking of the Major Eazy character, who first appeared in 2003. Gerry Finley-Day contributed The V.C.s, a future war story inspired by the Vietnam War, drawn by McMahon, Cam Kennedy, Garry Leach and John Richardson.

A feature of the early years of 2000 AD was the opportunities it gave to young British comic artists: by the time the title celebrated its 100th issue Brian Bolland, Dave Gibbons, Ian Gibson, Mike McMahon and Kevin O'Neil were all established as regulars.

=== 1980s ===
In 1980 Judge Dredd gained a new enemy. Writer John Wagner realised that Dredd's habit of shooting just about everybody he came up against meant that it was difficult to create a recurring villain. The solution was Judge Death, an undead judge from another dimension where, since all crime was committed by the living, life itself was outlawed. The law had been thoroughly enforced on his own world, and now he had come to Mega-City One to continue his work. Judge Death first appeared in an atmospheric three-parter drawn by Brian Bolland which also introduced Judge Anderson and Psi Division, a squad of judges with psychic powers.

Dredd soon began another epic journey in "The Judge Child". A dying Psi Division Judge had predicted disaster for Mega-City One unless it was ruled by a boy with a birthmark shaped like an eagle, so Dredd set off into the Cursed Earth, to Texas City, and into deep space in search of the boy, Owen Krysler, and his kidnappers, the Angel Gang. All of them were killed during the course of the story, however the Mean Machine was later resurrected by Krysler during "Destiny's Angels". "The Judge Child" was drawn by Bolland, Ron Smith and Mike McMahon in rotation, and the later episodes marked the beginning of Wagner's long-running writing partnership with Alan Grant. The pair would go on to write Strontium Dog, Robo-Hunter and many other stories for 2000 AD, as well as for Roy of the Rovers, Battle and the relaunched Eagle in the United Kingdom, and a number of comics in America.

With prog 178 all current stories, with the exception of Judge Dredd, were wound up, and a new set of stories was launched simultaneously, consisting of Mean Arena, set around a violent high-tech street football game, Meltdown Man, whose hero was transported to a genetically engineered far future by a nuclear explosion, the return of Strontium Dog and Dash Decent, a Flash Gordon parody.

Pat Mills introduced Comic Rock, which was meant to be a format for short stories inspired by popular music. The first story, inspired by The Jam's Going Underground, was drawn by Kevin O'Neill and featured a complicated underground travel network on a planet called "Termight", in which a freedom fighter called Nemesis battles the despotic Torquemada, chief of the Tube Police. All that was seen of Nemesis was the outside of his vehicle, the Blitzspear. The story was a reaction to an earlier tube chase sequence Mills and O'Neill had done in Ro-Busters, which management objected to.

The only other Comic Rock story was a follow-up called "Killer Watt", in which Nemesis and Torquemada fought on a teleport system. This led to a series, Nemesis the Warlock, in which it was revealed that Termight was Earth in the far future. Torquemada was changed from the Chief of Traffic Police to a despotic demagogue leading a campaign of genocide against all aliens, and Nemesis was the leader of the alien resistance. Mills and O'Neill were on a roll and produced a stream of bizarre and imaginative ideas, but ultimately O'Neill was unable to continue the level of work he was putting into it on 2000 AD pay. He left to work for DC Comics in America, and was replaced on Nemesis by first Jesus Redondo and then Bryan Talbot.

2000 AD would occasionally take a gamble on non-science fiction material. For example, Fiends of the Eastern Front was a World War II vampire story by Gerry Finley-Day and Carlos Ezquerra which was probably originally intended for Battle. Its hero was a German soldier who discovered that some of his Romanian allies were vampires. Later in the war, when Romania changed sides, he was the only one who knew their secret.

A readers' poll revealed that future war was a popular topic, so Gerry Finley-Day was asked to come up with a new war story. He, editor Steve MacManus and artist Dave Gibbons devised Rogue Trooper, a "Genetic Infantryman" engineered to be immune to chemical warfare hunting down the traitor general who had betrayed his regiment, who debuted in 1981. He was supported by bio-chips of the personalities of three dead comrades, which, slotted into his equipment, could talk to him. Gibbons left the strip early on and was replaced by Colin Wilson, Brett Ewins and Cam Kennedy. Rogue Trooper replaced Meltdown Man, which had recently ended its run.

Another new strip in 1981, inspired by the brief CB radio craze, was Ace Trucking Co., a comedy about pointy-headed alien space trucker Ace Garp and his crew by Wagner, Grant and Belardinelli.

In the Judge Dredd series, Mega-City One had grown too large and unwieldy: therefore authors Wagner and Grant they planned to cut it down to size. "Block Mania", in which wars broke out between rival city-blocks, turned out to be a plot orchestrated by the Russian city East-Meg One, and led directly to "The Apocalypse War", another six-month epic and a hard-hitting satire on the concept of mutually assured destruction. East-Meg One, protected by a warp-shield, softened up Mega-City One with nuclear warheads before invading. Dredd spearheaded the resistance, leading a small team to East-Meg territory, hijacking their nuclear bunkers and blowing East-Meg One off the face of the earth. "The Apocalypse War" was drawn in its entirety by Carlos Ezquerra, making a return to the character he created.

A new writer, Alan Moore, had started contributing Future Shocks in 1980. He wrote more than fifty one-off strips over the next three years, while also contributing to various Marvel UK titles and the independent magazine Warrior. In 1982 he gained his first series, Skizz, a less sentimental take on the same basic plot used in E.T. the Extra-Terrestrial, set in Birmingham and influenced by Alan Bleasdale's Boys from the Blackstuff. The series was drawn by Jim Baikie.

Moore wrote another series, D.R. and Quinch, spun off from a one-off Time Twister. Drawn by Alan Davis, the strip featured a pair of alien juvenile delinquents with a penchant for mindless thermonuclear destruction. He went on to create The Ballad of Halo Jones with artist Ian Gibson. Halo was an everywoman in the far future, born into mass unemployment on a floating housing estate, who escaped the earth and became involved in a terrible galactic war. Three books were published, and more were planned, but Moore's demands for creator's rights and his increasing commitments to American publishers meant they never materialised.

A new character, Sláine, debuted in 1983, but had been in development since 1981. Created by Pat Mills and his then wife Angela Kincaid, Sláine was a barbarian fantasy strip based on Celtic mythology. Kincaid was a children's book illustrator who had never worked in comics before, and her opening episode was drawn and redrawn several times before the editors were satisfied. Other stories were written for artists Massimo Belardinelli and Mike McMahon, but these could not see print until Kincaid's episode was ready.

In 1985, after appearing as a supporting character in Judge Dredd, Judge Anderson finally appeared in her own series, written by Wagner and Grant and initially drawn by Brett Ewins. New artist Glenn Fabry debuted on Sláine, but, due to his slowness, he was rotated with David Pugh. In the Judge Dredd story "Letter from a Democrat", Wagner and Grant introduced a pro-democracy movement in Mega-City One, which is after all a police state. This would provide plotlines for years to come.

In 1986 the comic reached its 500th issue. A new Sláine story, Sláine the King, began, entirely drawn by Fabry. Peter Milligan, a writer who had been contributing Future Shocks, began two series, the bleak future war story Bad Company and a strange, psychedelic series called The Dead. In 1986, 2000 AD was selling 150,000 copies a week.

In 1987 IPC's comics division was hived off and sold to publishing magnate Robert Maxwell as Fleetway. 2000 AD was revamped, with a larger page size and full process colour on the covers and centre pages. Richard Burton became editor. Kevin O'Neill returned for a short Nemesis series called "Torquemada the God". Not long after came the debut of Zenith, 2000 AD's first serious superhero strip, by new writer Grant Morrison and artist Steve Yeowell. The title character was a shallow pop singer with superhuman powers, caught up in the intrigues of a 1960s generation of superhumans and the machinations of some Lovecraftian elder gods.

Wagner and Grant began a new Dredd Epic, "Oz", featuring Chopper, a popular supporting character. Chopper was a skysurfer who had been imprisoned for competing in an illegal surfing competition a few years previously. A legal "Supersurf" race was being held in Oz, the future Australia, and Chopper escaped to compete. Dredd also went to Oz, partly to deal with Chopper, but mostly to investigate the Judda, a clone army created by Mega-City One's former chief genetic engineer. The Judda were defeated, and Chopper narrowly lost the race to Jug McKenzie. Dredd was waiting at the finish line, but McKenzie distracted him and allowed Chopper to escape into the outback. This ending was apparently the cause of some dispute between Wagner and Grant, and was a contributing factor (it was The Last American, a mini series for Epic Comics which would mark the end) in ending their regular writing partnership. Wagner kept Dredd, while Grant continued Strontium Dog and Judge Anderson. However the pair would still come together for occasional collaborations.

The "Oz" storyline had some lasting implications. Kraken, a Judda cloned from the same genetic material as Dredd, was captured by Justice Department, who had plans for him. Chopper also spun off into his own series, written by Wagner and drawn by Colin MacNeil.

The ABC Warriors finally had their own series again in 1987 as a spin-off from Nemesis. This was written, as ever, by Pat Mills, and drawn by two artists in rotation, newcomer Simon Bisley and science fiction artist S.M.S.

In 1988 Grant and artist Simon Harrison began a new Strontium Dog story, "The Final Solution". It took nearly two years to complete, and ended with the death of Johnny Alpha, who sacrificed his life to save mutants from extermination. Original artist Carlos Ezquerra did not agree with the decision to kill the character off, and refused to draw it.

The number of colour pages was increased, allowing for one complete strip per issue to be painted. Initially the colour pages were reserved for Judge Dredd, but were later given over to a new Sláine story, "The Horned God", fully painted by Simon Bisley. The series was collected as a series of three graphic novels, then as a single volume, and has remained in print ever since.

In 1989 the colour pages were increased again, allowing for three colour stories and two black and white in every issue. One of the colour series was Rogue Trooper: the War Machine, written by Dave Gibbons and painted by Will Simpson. The original Rogue Trooper series had run out of steam after the Traitor General had been dealt with, though continued with Rogue's adventures on Horst and the "Hit" series, so Gibbons revamped the concept, creating a different genetic infantryman, Friday, in a different war, albeit in the same universe.

One of the black and white stories, "The Dead Man", was a low-key beginning for a major event. In the Cursed Earth, villagers come across a man, burnt from head to toe, with no memory of who he is or what happened to him. As he tries to piece his memories back together, he is being hunted by the evil beings who left him in that state. A creepy, atmospheric horror-western, it was drawn by John Ridgway and written by "Keef Ripley", a pseudonym for John Wagner. By the end of the series the Dead Man had discovered his identity: he was Judge Dredd.

=== 1990s ===
As "The Dead Man" ended, a new Judge Dredd story, "Tale of the Dead Man", explained how Dredd had ended up in that position. Dredd was getting older and the democratic movement was causing him to doubt his role, so Justice Department had groomed Kraken, the former Judda cloned from his bloodline, to replace him. Kraken was now ready for his final assessment, and Dredd himself was chosen to assess him. Although Kraken performed faultlessly, Dredd thought he perceived a hint of his former allegiance to the Judda in him, and failed him. He then resigned as a judge and took the 'Long Walk' into the Cursed Earth. There he met the Sisters of Death, and only barely survived the encounter. This could mean only one thing: Judge Death was back.

This set up the latest six-month epic, "Necropolis". After Dredd had left, Justice Department had put Kraken through one final test, and given him Dredd's badge. But the Sisters of Death, spirit beings from Judge Death's dimension, were able to use Kraken's inner conflict to take control of him and use him to bring Judge Death and the other Dark Judges back from the limbo dimension Dredd had exiled them to. The Sisters possessed all the city's judges and began to enforce Death's twisted law. Out in the Cursed Earth, Dredd had recovered his memory and returned to defeat the Dark Judges. He then tried to lance the democratic boil by holding a referendum on whether the Judges should continue to govern the city. The judges won, by a small margin on a desultory turnout, and Dredd was satisfied.

2000 AD gained an influx of talent from other comics. Garth Ennis and John Smith had come to prominence writing for Crisis, a 2000 AD spin-off for older readers, while artists Jamie Hewlett and Philip Bond were the stars of Deadline, an independent comics and popular culture magazine founded by Steve Dillon and Brett Ewins. Smith created Indigo Prime, a multi-dimensional organisation that polices reality, whose most memorable story was "Killing Time", a time travel story featuring Jack the Ripper. Garth Ennis and Philip Bond contributed Time Flies, a time-travel comedy, and Hewlett was paired with writer Peter Milligan for the surreal Hewligan's Haircut. Writer John Tomlinson and artist Simon Jacob created Armoured Gideon, an action-comedy series about a giant killer robot charged with keeping demons from invading earth.

The Judge Dredd Megazine, a monthly title set in the world of Dredd, was launched in October 1990. With John Wagner focusing his attentions there, Garth Ennis became the regular writer of Dredd in the weekly.

American writer Michael Fleisher, who had written The Spectre and Jonah Hex in the 1970s, was recruited to write the continuing adventures of the new Rogue Trooper, along with several other strips, none of which went down very well. Another new writer who failed to set 2000 AD on fire was Mark Millar, whose revival of Robo-Hunter was particularly unpopular. Millar has since gone on to become a successful writer of American superhero comics such as The Authority and The Ultimates.

2000 AD went all-colour about this time (prog 723, dated 23 March 1991), in response to a short-lived new colour weekly, Toxic!, launched by Pat Mills and many of the core 2000 AD team of creators. Toxic! only lasted 31 issues but many of the creators who had worked on the comic eventually found their way to work for 2000 AD. Button Man, a contemporary thriller by John Wagner and Arthur Ranson, was originally intended for Toxic! but ended up in 2000 AD.

A new ABC Warriors series, written by Mills and Tony Skinner and painted by Kev Walker, began in 1991, in which Deadlock took over the warriors with his "Khaos" philosophy.

The old IPC strip Kelly's Eye was revived, by the new creative team of Alan McKenzie, Brett Ewins, and Zac Sandler, in 1993, when the publishers realized they no longer had the rights to the character.

Robert Maxwell died in late 1991, and Fleetway was merged with London Editions, a Danish-owned company that owned rights to Disney characters, to become Fleetway Editions.

In 1992, 2000 AD and the Judge Dredd Megazine ran their first crossover story, "Judgement Day", in which zombies overran Mega-City One. Written by Garth Ennis and drawn by Carlos Ezquerra, Peter Doherty, Dean Ormston and Chris Halls, the story teamed Judge Dredd with Johnny Alpha through the medium of time travel. John Smith and artist Paul Marshall created Firekind, a slow-paced story about dragons and alien societies, which was accidentally published with its episodes in the wrong order.

The Strontium Dog world was eventually spun out to encompass a wider field, gaining the plural name Strontium Dogs – characters such as female vampire Durham Red, the albino Feral Jackson, and former Johnny Alpha sidekick The Gronk – the latter, normally a timid creature with weak "heartses", became a gung-ho action character upon learning of Alpha's death. However, in the 12-parter The Darkest Star, it transpires that the one to actually kill him was the Gronk himself; changed into a form designed by a cadre of Lyran necromancers to bring him endless agony, Alpha asked his friend to end his torment.

The "Summer Offensive" was an eight-week experiment in 1993, when new editor Alan McKenzie gave free rein to writers Grant Morrison, Mark Millar and John Smith, to a mixed reception. Morrison wrote a Dredd story, "Inferno", and a drug-influenced comedy adventure, Really & Truly. Smith contributed Slaughterbowl, in which convicted criminals on dinosaurs are pitted against each other in a deadly sport, with the survivor being paroled for a year and granted wealth – but being forced to enter the Slaughterbowl again the next year. Millar wrote Maniac 5, an action-packed series about a remote controlled war-robot. During this run was a satire of British tabloid attitudes titled Big Dave, written by Morrison and Millar and drawn by Steve Parkhouse.

John Tomlinson became editor in 1994, and a second crossover between 2000 AD and the Megazine, "Wilderlands", began. Written by Wagner and drawn by Ezquerra, Mick Austin and Trevor Hairsine, it followed on from "Mechanismo", a series of stories in the Megazine in which Justice Department, opposed by Dredd, tried to introduce robot judges. With Wagner writing, Judge Dredd was again the flagship strip.

Former Megazine editor David Bishop became editor of the weekly in 1996 but sales continued to decline. Unsuccessful series were dropped, and a number of new series were tried out, some more successful than others. Writer Dan Abnett introduced Sinister Dexter in 1996, a strip about two hitmen influenced by the film Pulp Fiction, which became a regular feature. In 1997, writer Robbie Morrison and artist Simon Fraser, who had worked with Bishop on the Megazine, created Nikolai Dante, a swashbuckling series set in future Russia starring a thief and ladies' man who discovers he's the illegitimate scion of an aristocratic dynasty. There were also gimmicks, like the "sex issue", sold in a clear plastic wrapper, The Spacegirls, a series attempting to cash in on the popularity of the Spice Girls, B.L.A.I.R. 1, a parody of Tony Blair based on M.A.C.H. 1, and an adaptation of the Danny Boyle film A Life Less Ordinary.

A new Dredd epic, "Doomsday", appeared in 1999 and again ran in both 2000 AD and the Megazine. Wagner had been laying the foundations for this story for several years, introducing the main villain, semi-robotic gang lord Nero Narcos, and supporting characters like Judge Edgar of the Public Surveillance Unit, and Galen DeMarco, a former judge who had quit after falling in love with Dredd and become a private eye.

1999 also saw the return of another character, Nemesis the Warlock. After a break of ten years, writer Pat Mills decided to bring the story to an end with "The Final Conflict". The series was drawn by Henry Flint in a style that recalled Kevin O'Neill's early work on the series, as well as Simon Bisley's ABC Warriors work.

The decade ended with a special 100-page issue called "Prog 2000". Behind a cover by Brian Bolland, Nemesis wrapped up for good in a final episode drawn by Kevin O'Neill. War broke out in Nikolai Dante, and writer Gordon Rennie and artist Mark Harrison introduced future war story Glimmer Rats. Another old favourite, Strontium Dog, was revived by Wagner and Ezquerra, telling new stories of Johnny Alpha set before his death, with the conceit that previous stories had been "folklore" and the new stories were "what really happened", allowing Wagner to revise continuity.

=== 2000s ===
The publisher has been owned by Rebellion Developments since 2000, with editors Andy Diggle and (since 2002) Matt Smith at the helm. Rebellion continues to develop stories (and computer games) based on classic characters such as Rogue Trooper and Judge Dredd, and has also introduced a roster of new series including Shakara, The Red Seas and Caballistics, Inc.. It has also published a tie-in to the film Shaun of the Dead in a story written by Simon Pegg and Edgar Wright.

The comic continues to uncover new British talents, including Boo Cook, Dom Reardon and Al Ewing. It has also benefited from an improved dollar-pound exchange rate that has meant the comic can now afford to re-employ some of the talent thought lost to America.

A number of shorter self-contained stories, partly created by the new wave of talent, have run including London Falling, Stone Island and Zombo. Other developments include a revamping of the Judge Dredd Megazine which has included a section acting as a showcase for British small press comics. Starting in program 1500 was the Judge Dredd story "The Connection", a "prelude" to a 23-part Judge Dredd epic "Origins" which filled in a lot of the details about Dredd's past.

In prog 1526, dated 28 February 2007, 2000 AD celebrated their 30th anniversary. The issue saw the start of two new storylines: Nikolai Dante (by Robbie Morrison and Simon Fraser) and Savage (by Pat Mills and Charlie Adlard), along with a one-off episode of Flesh (by Pat Mills and Ramon Sola). The run-up to this saw the first arcs of new series Stickleback and Kingdom.

2000 AD was also made available online through Clickwheel, another Rebellion Developments-owned firm. Starting in December 2007, the latest issue was made available to download as a PDF. In early 2008 it was announced that an archive of the 2007 issues would be added to the service. The Clickwheel Comics Reader was launched in July 2008 which would allow the digital versions of the comics to be downloaded and read on the iPhone and iPod Touch.

=== 2010s ===
On 19 March 2012 the Royal Mail launched a special stamp collection to celebrate Britain's rich comic book history, which included 2000 AD.

In 2015 a documentary about the history of the comic was made, called Future Shock! The Story of 2000AD.

On 1 October 2016, signings were held at comic shops in the UK, Ireland, Australia and the US to mark the publication of the 2000th prog. In the same week a 40th birthday convention was announced, which was held in Hammersmith, London in February 2017. At the convention itself, it was announced by the Kingsley brothers that Rebellion would be willing to speak to outside software developers on developing 2000 AD's intellectual property. In the same year, former editor Steve MacManus published his memoirs, The Mighty One: My Life Inside The Nerve Centre.

In 2017, founding editor Pat Mills published his memoirs, Be Pure! Be Vigilant! Behave! 2000 AD and Judge Dredd: The Secret History. Later in that year, Hachette Partworks began publishing 2000 AD: The Ultimate Collection, initially an 80-volume fortnightly series of hardback books featuring classic stories from the first 40 years of the comic. Now the Collection has been extended to 180 volumes. This followed the success of Judge Dredd: The Mega Collection, which had started in 2015 and later been extended to 90 volumes.

In June 2018 (July in the United States) a special issue was published, the 2000 AD Sci-Fi Special 2018, which contained stories written and illustrated entirely by women.

Starting in May 2019, 2000 AD began publishing periodic "all ages" issues every quarter, marketed as 2000 AD Regened, and targeted at younger readers. In these sixteen issues, Judge Dredd was replaced by Cadet Dredd stories. This lasted until November 2023.

== Lists of stories ==
Wikimedia Commons has the following indexes:

- Index of every story published in 2000 AD to September 2026 (#1 to #2500)
- Index of all the Judge Dredd stories to appear in 2000 AD (including specials and annuals) up to September 2026 (to #2500)

== Crossovers ==
Although there is no overall shared universe containing all 2000 AD stories, some stories spin-off or crossover into other stories. These include the numerous stories that occur in the Judge Dredd universe. Many stories by Pat Mills, which are frequently interlinked, link into the Dredd universe as well, though have been partially retconned by the writer. Many stories written by Ian Edginton feature shared themes and references.

== Editors ==
A long-running theme is that the editor of 2000 AD is Tharg the Mighty, a green extraterrestrial from Betelgeuse who terms his readers "Earthlets". Tharg uses other unique alien expressions and even appears in his own comic strips. Readers sometimes play along with this; for example, in prog 201 a pair of readers wrote to Tharg claiming that they preferred to be called "Terrans"; the resulting controversy ended in Tharg allowing readers to vote for the preferred term in prog 229. In prog 240 Tharg announced that the result was a draw, and "Terran" became an accepted term for readers' letters in the Nerve Centre. In similar vein, Tharg used to draw distinction between male and female letter-writers with "Earthlet" and "Earthlette" until a letter was printed in Prog 314 complaining about the use, and Tharg agreed to use "Earthlet" (or "Terran") regardless of gender. From prog 531 the term "Earthlette" was reintroduced.

Another running theme is Tharg's use of robots to draw and write the strips, which bear a marked resemblance to the actual writers and artists. A fictional reason for Tharg to use mechanical assistance was given when the robots "went on strike" (reflecting real-life industrial action that occasionally halted IPC's comics production during the 1970s and 1980s). Tharg wrote and drew a whole issue himself, but when he ran it through the quality-control "Thrill-meter", the device melted down on extreme overload. The offending issue had to be taken away, by blindfolded security guards, to a lead-lined vault where there was no danger of anyone seeing it accidentally. The role of Tharg has been performed by the following editors:

1. Pat Mills, #1–16 (1977)
2. Kelvin Gosnell, #17–85 (1977–1978) Assistant editor Nick Landau largely edited the comic himself in 1978 while Gosnell was occupied with editing new sister title Starlord.
3. Steve MacManus, #86–519 or #500 (1978–1987)
4. Richard Burton, #520–872 or #501–872 (1987–1994)
5. Alan McKenzie, #873–914 (1994)
6. John Tomlinson, #915–977 (1994–1996)
7. David Bishop, #978–1199 (1996–2000)
8. Andy Diggle, #1200–1273 (2000–2002)
9. Matt Smith, #1274–present (2002–present)

Starting in December 2004, an additional editor's note, titled "Damage Control", began appearing in the legal fine print at the bottom of the first page of every issue. This editor's note is written not from the perspective of Tharg but from that of Matt Smith, the sitting editor since "Damage Control" started.

== Contributors ==
Well-known contributors to 2000 AD include:

- Nick Abadzis
- Dan Abnett
- Massimo Belardinelli
- Simon Bisley
- Brian Bolland
- Philip Bond
- Chris Cunningham
- Alan Davis
- Steve Dillon
- D'Israeli
- Ian Edginton
- Garth Ennis
- Al Ewing
- Brett Ewins
- Carlos Ezquerra
- Gerry Finley-Day
- Michael Fleisher
- Henry Flint
- Tom Frame
- Neil Gaiman
- Dave Gibbons
- Ian Gibson
- Alan Grant
- Trevor Hairsine
- Jamie Hewlett
- John Hicklenton
- John Higgins
- David Hine
- Frazer Irving
- Jock
- Cam Kennedy
- Tony Lee
- Brendan McCarthy
- Maura McHugh
- Mike McMahon
- Mark Millar
- Peter Milligan
- Pat Mills
- Alan Moore
- Grant Morrison
- Robbie Morrison
- Kevin O'Neill
- Arthur Ranson
- Gordon Rennie
- John Ridgway
- John Smith
- Ron Smith
- Simon Spurrier
- Richard Starkings
- Bryan Talbot
- John Wagner
- Kev Walker
- Chris Weston

Many of these have since moved on to work for American publishers such as DC Comics (especially the Vertigo and Wildstorm imprints) and Marvel Comics.

== Film and TV adaptations ==
- Hardware (1990)
- Judge Dredd (1995)
- Dredd (2012)
- Rogue Trooper (TBA)
- Judge Dredd: Mega-City One (TBA)
- Button Man: Get Harry Ex (TBA)

== Audio adaptations ==
In 2021, Rebellion Publishing and Penguin Random House released five audio drama adaptations of classic 2000 AD stories:

- The Ballad of Halo Jones
- Brink: Volumes 1-3
- Judge Dredd: America
- Judge Dredd: The Pit
- Sláine: The Horned God

== Video game adaptations ==
The first 2000AD video games for 8-bit computers were two games based on Strontium Dog published by Quicksilva in 1984 for the ZX Spectrum and Commodore 64.

Melbourne House released the first Judge Dredd game on the Commodore 64 in 1986 and ZX Spectrum the following year. The second Judge Dredd game was published by Virgin Games in 1991 for the Amiga, Atari ST, Amstrad CPC, Commodore 64, and ZX Spectrum platforms.

Martech produced two titles, Nemesis the Warlock and Sláine, while Piranha Software only published one 2000AD video game, Rogue Trooper (written by Design Design) it had games based on Judge Death and Halo Jones in development which were never released.

Krisalis Software released another adaptation of Rogue Trooper for the Amiga and Atari ST in 1991, and the merchandising that accompanied the 1995 Judge Dredd film included tie-in games for the IBM PC (MS-DOS), Game Boy, Game Gear, PlayStation, Sega Genesis and Super Nintendo Entertainment System.

A Judge Dredd arcade game was created but never completed nor released. It can be found online, where it is available for free, but requires an arcade / coin-op emulator. It features Mean Machine and other Angel Gang members.

A Judge Dredd Pinball game was released for MS-DOS in 1998. The same year saw the release of a Judge Dredd videogame for the Sony PlayStation which was developed by Gremlin Interactive and published by Activision.

With the purchase of 2000 AD by Rebellion Developments, a computer game company, several more 2000 AD-linked games have been released or are under development. Judge Dredd: Dredd Vs. Death was released in 2003 and Rogue Trooper followed in 2006 for the Xbox, PlayStation 2 and Microsoft Windows. An updated version for the Wii entitled Rogue Trooper: Quartz Zone Massacre was released in December 2009.

A licensed Judge Dredd choose your own adventure style game "Judge Dredd: Countdown Sector 106" was released in 2012 by Australian and UK-based Tin Man Games for iOS, subsequently for Google Play and Steam.

== Awards ==
Although the various stories and creators have also won awards, (see the various entries for details) the comic itself has its own trophies:

- 1979: Won the Eagle Awards: Favourite Comic (UK)
- 1986: Won the Eagle Awards: Favourite Comic – British
- 1987: Won the Eagle Awards: Favourite Comic – British
- 1988: Won the Eagle Awards: Favourite Comic – British
- 1990:
  - Won the Eagle Awards: Favourite Comic – British
  - Won the Eagle Awards: Roll of Honour
- 1992: Nominated for UK Comic Art Award: Best Ongoing Publication
- 1993: Nominated for UK Comic Art Award: Best Ongoing Publication
- 1997:
  - Won the National Comics Awards: Best Comic (British)
  - Nominated for the National Comics Awards: Best British Comic Ever
  - Nominated for UK Comic Art Award: Best Ongoing Publication
- 1998: Won the National Comics Awards: Best Comic (British)
- 1999:
  - Won the National Comics Awards: Best Comic (British)
  - Won the Eagle Awards: Favourite British Comic
  - Prog 2000 nominated for the Eagle Awards: Favourite Cover Published During 1999
- 2000:
  - Won the Eagle Awards: Favourite British Comic
  - 2000adonline.com nominated for the Eagle Awards: Favourite Comics Related Website
  - Tharg the Mighty (David Bishop) nominated for the Eagle Awards: Favourite Comics Editor
- 2001:
  - Won the National Comics Awards: Best Comic in the World Ever
  - Won the National Comics Awards: Best Comic Ever
  - Won the Eagle Awards: Favourite British Comic
  - Tharg the Mighty (Andy Diggle) won the Eagle Awards: Favourite Comics Editor
- 2002:
  - Nominated for the National Comics Awards: Best Comic Ever
  - 2000adonline.com nominated for the National Comics Awards: Best Specialist Magazine or Website
  - Nominated for the National Comics Awards: Best Comic Now
- 2004: won the Diamond Comics Awards: Best comic
- 2006: won the Eagle Award for Best British Colour Comic
- 2007:
  - Won the Eagle Award for Favourite Colour Comicbook – British
  - 2000adonline.com nominated for the Eagle Award for Favourite Comics Related Website
  - Tharg the Mighty (Matt Smith) won the Eagle Awards: Favourite Comics Editor
- 2008:
  - Nominated for the Eagle Award for Favourite Colour Comicbook – British
  - 2000adonline.com nominated for the Eagle Award for Favourite Comics Related Website
  - Tharg the Mighty (Matt Smith) won the Eagle Awards: Favourite Comics Editor
- 2010: Won the Eagle Award for Favourite Colour Comicbook – British
- 2011:
  - Won the Eagle Award for Favourite British Comicbook – Colour
  - Tharg the Mighty (Matt Smith) won the Eagle Awards: Favourite Comics Editor
- 2012: Tharg the Mighty (Matt Smith) nominated for the Eagle Awards: Favourite Comics Editor
- 2013: Nominated for the Eisner Award for Best Anthology
- 2014: Won the True Believers Comics Award for Favourite British Comic: Colour

== Related publications ==
- The current sister publication to 2000 AD is the monthly Judge Dredd Megazine, which originally focused exclusively on expanding the world of Judge Dredd, but in recent years has expanded its focus to include other stories set in other universes as well.
- Starlord was a weekly title (originally intended to be monthly) launched in 1978 following much the same format as 2000 AD and included Strontium Dog and Ro-Busters which introduced characters that would later reappear in ABC Warriors. The two titles were merged later the same year and published as 2000AD and Starlord. A third Starlord series, TimeQuake, also had a 4-week run in 2000AD over a year later.
- Tornado was a weekly title launched in 1979. There was less emphasis on Science Fiction series. It was merged with 2000 AD after 22 issues, transferring the strips Blackhawk, The Mind of Wolfie Smith and Captain Klep. For a while the publication was titled 2000 AD and Tornado.
- Diceman (1986) was an early attempt at creating a role-playing comic featuring regular 2000 AD characters such as Rogue Trooper and Slaine, as well as original characters, like Diceman. The magazine was not a success and only lasted five issues.
- Crisis (1988–1991) was a sister publication that did not follow the format of 2000 AD, but did share many editorial staff and creative teams. Early issues featured two SF-themed stories aimed at a slightly older age group than 2000 AD with strong political themes. It became a magnet for British creators who wanted to create comics for the adult market. The 2000 AD series Finn, begun the year after Crisis was cancelled, continued the adventures of the character from Third World War, though with more of a fantasy emphasis.
- Revolver (1990–1991) joined Crisis though it only lasted for seven issues. Dan Dare was in the original line-up, and this transferred to Crisis when Revolver finished.
- A Best of 2000 AD title was published in the mid-1980s which featured reprint material from early issues of 2000 AD. In the early 1990s, The Complete Judge Dredd began publication in a similar format. Both titles were relaunched as Classic 2000AD and Classic Judge Dredd in the mid-1990s but were cancelled soon after.
- The bimonthly 2000 AD Extreme Edition presented reprints of classic and hard-to-find 2000AD stories, but poor sales led to its cancellation in mid-2008. Since the cancellation, a smaller reprint supplement has been packaged with the Judge Dredd Megazine instead.
- A yearly hardcover annual was published from 1977 to 1990 (though the cover dates on the annuals were always the following year). From 1991 this was replaced by a softcover 2000AD Yearbook; the last of these was published in 1994. There were also annuals/yearbooks dedicated to 2000 AD characters such as Dan Dare (1978–1979, cover dated 1979–1980), Judge Dredd (1980–1994) and Rogue Trooper (1990).
- An annual summer special was published during the summer months between 1977 and 1996, entitled the 2000AD Sci-Fi Special from 1978. This was revived in 2014.
- Other specials include the 2000AD Winter Special (1988–1995, 2005 and 2014), Judge Dredd Mega Special (1988–1996) and Rogue Trooper Action Special (1996). (1996's Judge Dredd Action Special was a tie-in to the defunct Judge Dredd: Lawman of the Future rather than 2000AD proper).
- In April 1992, a 2000AD Action Special featured six strips reviving classic British comics characters such as the Steel Claw. Of these only Kelly's Eye also appeared in 2000 AD proper.
- In the mid-1990s a series of 2000 AD Poster Progs were published, each featuring a new strip. There were five Judge Dredd poster magazines, plus one each for four other 2000 AD series: Nemesis the Warlock, Strontium Dogs, Sláine and Rogue Trooper.
- A series of American comic format reprints started in 1983 by Eagle Comics with the first issue of an ongoing monthly Judge Dredd title. Eagle Comics also reprinted other 2000 AD material in other titles. The license to reprint 2000 AD material in the US was later taken over by Quality Comics. These reprints ended in the early 1990s.
- Toxic! was a short-lived rival publication, established by 2000 AD talent, that was published during 1991.

=== Fanzines ===
2000 AD has an active fanbase, which has produced a number of independent fanzines.

In 1998 W.R. Logan, frustrated at the lack of activity from the comic's publishers both in promoting the title and also in making best use of new talents, decided to create an independent title using 2000 AD copyrighted characters and situations. This was titled Class of '79, named after the year of Dredd's graduation from the Academy of Law – 2079. The first couple of issues contained work from now-professional comics creators Rufus Dayglo, Boo Cook, Henry Flint and PJ Holden and won the best Self Published/Independent Comic Award at the 1999 National Comics Awards.

In 2001, Andrew J. Lewis created Zarjaz comic, with strips featuring characters from a variety of 2000 AD stories. There were also interviews with Alan Grant, Frazer Irving and Alan Moore, as well as an extensive article on breaking into comics as a writer.

Another long-running fanzine, dedicated to the world of Johnny Alpha, is Dogbreath, originally run by the pseudonymous Dr Bob it is now being produced by FutureQuake Publishing. In 2003, Arthur Wyatt created FutureQuake, a fanzine devoted to the Future Shocks format. Although Class of '79 and FutureQuake now appear to be on hiatus, the other titles are in continuous publication, Zarjaz having started up again with a new issue 1.

In addition, a number of small press comics have emerged from the 2000 AD fanbase, including Solar Wind, Omnivistascope and The End Is Nigh.

== See also ==
- List of 2000 AD stories
- List of minor 2000 AD stories
- Action
- British comics
- British Invasion, which saw a number of 2000 AD artists and writers working for the big American firms during the 1980s.
