= List of Action stories =

A list of stories published in the IPC weekly boys' comic Action between 1976 and 1977.

== Blackjack ==
Published: 14 February to 4 September 1976
Writers: John Wagner, Chris Lowder
Artists: Leopold Sánchez, Gustavos Trigo, Alan Philpott

Jack Barron, a British professional boxer who fights in order to help poor kids escape the hard life he had as a youth, discovers that he is going blind. Despite his worsening condition he fights on to the delight of his followers but eventually loses his eyesight and moves into the music industry in an attempt to raise money for an experimental operation to restore his vision.

- Wagner would later admit Muhammad Ali was the main inspiration for the strip, though he made Barron less cocky, and he was proud to "help redress the balance" at a time when British comics rarely featured minorities in positive roles. However, he grew tired of the story and had Barron finally lose his sight as he ran out of interest. Chris Lowder was subsequently asked to continue the strip.

== The Coffin Sub ==
Published: 14 February to 3 April 1976
Writer: Ron Carpenter
Artist: Angelo Todaro

Submarine HMS Conquest sinks, with Lieutenant-Commander Mark Kane the sole survivor. The sub is raised, refitted and sent back into service with Kane in command, hell-bent on getting revenge for his old crew and with his new crew wary that he might sent them to a watery grave too.

- Pat Mills originally envisioned the strip as a "creepy horror story" but felt the story was too traditionalist, and only ran it because time was running out. Readers were similarly unimpressed, and the story was the first to be dropped from the initial line-up. The story was later reprinted in the 1981 and 1984 Action Annuals, and All-Action Monthly.

== Death Game 1999 ==
Published: 8 May to 16 October 1976, 4 December 1976 to 12 November 1977
Writer: Tom Tully
Artists: Costa, Ian Gibson, Mike White, Massimo Belardinelli, Ron Turner

A lethal future sport played by condemned prisoners.

- Renamed "Spinball" from 4 December 1976. Continued in Battle as "The Spinball Wars".

== Double Dynamite ==
Published: 4 December 1976 to 18 June 1977
Writer: Scott Goodall
Artists: Felix Carrion, Bill Lacey

Amateur boxers and best friends Tyke Trueman and Ossie Miller are signed up by professional trainer Bulldog Brady, with the former as a heavyweight and the latter as a middleweight. The pair get involved in numerous scrapes as their careers advance.

- Chris Lowder (who wrote for Action under his Jack Adrian pseudonym) has claimed the early episodes of "Double Dynamite" were taken from a rejected story for another boys' weekly IPC had retained on file, with Goodall initially having to write to fit the completed art.

== Dredger ==
Published: 14 February to 16 October 1976, 4 December 1976 to 12 November 1977
Writers: Kelvin Gosnell, Pat Mills, Steve MacManus, Chris Lowder, Geoffrey Kemp, Stewart Wales, Gerry Finley-Day, Terry Magee
Artists: Horacio Altuna, Fred Holmes, Leandro Sesarego, Ricardo Villagrán, Jordi Badía Romero, Jesús Blasco, Geoff Campion

Intelligence agent Simon Breed of D.I.6 receives a tough new partner - the 'shoot-first, ask-questions-never' Dredger.

- Continued in Battle.

== Green's Grudge War ==
Published: 24 April to 18 September 1976
Writer: Gerry Finley-Day
Artist: Massimo Belardinelli

In 1942, Private James Green joins the Commandos, believing it to be the route to personal glory and medals. However, he soon clashes with the more humble Private John Bold, taking personal offense at the latter's thoughtless bravery and popular personality, and takes every opportunity to try and show him up. His envy is only stoked further when Bold is promoted to Corporal.

- The story was consistently lowly-rated by readers.

== Hell's Highway ==
Published: 19 June to 16 October 1976, 4 December 1976 to 2 April 1977
Writer: Alan Hebden, Chris Lowder
Artists: Mike White, Tom Hirst

Truckers Steve Manning and Danny Kuzlak find themselves drawn into espionage after stumbling across a road accident that has left USAF Intelligence officer George L. Doolly dead. In order to clear their name they are forced to carry out jobs by Hartwell and Hayer, two agents form a secret US government department.

- Alan Hebden pitched the story and wrote the first episode, inspired by the impact of C. W. McCall's hit song "Convoy", but was then uncontactable, leading to Lowder taking over the rest of the story. Following the withdrawal of Action, the planned October 23 episode of "Hell's Highway" was heavily censored to tone down the violence and remove all mention of Cuba from a storyline which had focused on a Bay of Pigs-style insurgency storyline. As Martin Baker noted in Action - The Story of a Violent Comic, this effectively made the storyline nonsensical. Moose Harris has speculated that the story was slated to end shortly afterwards anyway, but was prolonged due to the replacements already being needed to replace "Kids Rule - O.K." and "The Probationer", and noted that the number of uses the government had for an 18-wheeler truck operated by two civilians were already pushing credibility before the suspension.

== Hellman of Hammer Force ==
Published: 14 February to 16 October 1976, 4 December 1976 to 12 November 1977
Writer: Gerry Finley-Day
Artists: Mike Dorey, Alex Henderson, Mike White, Jim Watson

Honourable Wehrmacht tank commander Major Kurt Hellman fights for Germany while opposing the brutal attitudes shown by the Nazi regime.

- Continued in Battle. Rebellion Developments published a collection of the Action strips in 2021, under their Treasury of British Comics label.

== Hook Jaw ==
Published: 14 February to 16 October 1976, 4 December 1976 to 12 November 1977
Writers: Pat Mills, Ken Armstrong
Artists: Ramon Sola, John Stokes

Hook Jaw is a massive great white shark and the hero of the series, even though he spends most of his time eating most of the human cast of characters. The name 'Hook Jaw' comes from the gaff hook which remains stuck in the shark's jaw after some fisherman tried to catch the creature shortly before being eaten by it.

- Spitfire Comics released a collection of the pre-ban strips in Collected Hook Jaw vol.1 in 2007.

== Jinx Jackson ==
Published: 25 June to 12 November 1977
Artist: A.G. Coleman

Accident-prone 'Jinx' Jackson is a young staff photographer for the Transglobal News Service on Fleet Street; while his clumsiness irritates boss Jock McBane, Jackson has an uncanny knack of being in the middle of a story and ending up with important pictures.

== Kids Rule O.K. ==
Published: 11 September to 16 October 1976
Writer: Chris Lowder
Artist: Mike White

In a dystopian near-future London a plague has wiped out most of the adult population, with the result that violent gangs of children now run riot.

- Dropped without explanation after the suspension.

== The Loner ==
Published: 9 April to 17 September 1977
Writer: Chris Lowder
Artist: A.G. Coleman

All-action Detective Sergeant Tom Darrow is transferred to a new squad of undercover police under the leadership of Commander George Coutts, who soon has to deal with the tough, uncompromising cop.

== Look Out for Lefty! ==
Published: 1 May to 16 October 1976, 4 December 1976 to 12 November 1977
Writer: Tom Tully
Artists: Barrie Mitchell, Tony Harding

The adventures of Kenny Lampton, a working-class teenager whose powerful left foot gives him the nickname of "Lefty", as he juggles a budding career with Wigford Rovers with his senile grandfather and headstrong girlfriend Angie.

== Play Till You Drop! ==
Published: 14 February to 16 October 1976, 4 December 1976 to 12 November 1977
Writer: Ron Carpenter
Artist: Barrie Mitchell

Alec Shaw is seemingly living the dream as star striker for Rampton City, but his career takes a turn when a journalist named Grice turns up and begins blackmailing him, threatening to publish photographs of his father Tom - a retired player himself - taking bribes. Not wanting his father's name to be disgraced, he agrees to fix games for Grice.

- Like Carpenter's "The Coffin Sub", Mills felt the story was too traditional, and it was replaced by "Look Out for Lefty!". The story was later reprinted in All-Action Monthly.

== Probationer! ==
Published: 25 September to 16 October 1976
Writers: Stewart Wales, Geoff Kemp
Artist: Tom Hirst

Given a six-month probationary sentence, Dave Brockham tries to keep his nose clean despite a number of criminal acquaintances trying to get him involved in illegal activities.

- Dropped without explanation after the suspension.

== Roaring Wheels ==
Published: 4 December 1976 to 18 June 1977
Writers: Stewart Wales, Geoff Kemp
Artists: Mike White, Colin Page, Kim Raymond

Formula One ace Brad Foreman survives a huge crash at Indianapolis 500 and returns to fitness, only to be taken out of his comeback race by underhanded rival Luigi Solla. Sacked by the McGarren team, he goes it on his own, building up a Formula 5000 car in his garage.

== The Running Man ==
Published: 14 February to 12 June 1976
Writer: Steve MacManus
Artists: Horacio Lalia, Mike White

Visiting New York, British athlete Mike Carter becomes drawn into a Mafia plot when he is kidnapped and his face is altered with plastic surgery to resemble that of the wanted gangster Vito Scarlatti. Carter is forced to go on the run from the police while he tries to find a way to prove his innocence by finding the real Scarlatti.

- MacManus credited Pat Mills with creating the concept and working with him on the scripts. While he enjoyed writing the story but readers weren't keen on a hero who was constantly running away.

== School for Survivors ==
Published: 22 June to 12 November 1977

After a group of students from Alma Road Comprehensive are shipwrecked near a desert island in the West Indies, troublemakers Joey Slade, Sam Fern, Sludger Smith and Ralph Griffin immediately form a gang to start terrorising the other marooned pupils and staff.

== Slater's Steamer ==
Published: 24 September to 12 November 1977
Artist: A.G. Coleman

Brothers Gary and Tim Slater get trapped potholing. When they return to the surface they find Britain has been hit by a nuclear attack, leaving few survivors. The pair borrow a steam traction engine from eccentric survivor Lord Drago of Drax Manor to take them to London as they look for their father.

== Sport's Not for Losers! ==
Published: 14 February to 1 May 1976
Writer/s: Steve MacManus
Artist/s: Dudley Wynn

Barncastle hurdler Dan Walker tears his Achilles tendon, and seemingly ruins his hopes of making a career to help his impoverished father. Instead, he decides to begin training his slob brother Len to become a hurdler instead.
