= List of Battle Picture Weekly stories =

A list of stories published in the IPC weekly boys' comic Battle Picture Weekly between 1975 and 1988.

== Achilles the Avenger ==
Published: 8 April to 3 June 1978
Writer: Gil Page
Artist: Luis Lorente

A gentle Greek giant becomes a fearsome fighting machine after Germany invades.

== Action Force ==
Published: 4 June 1983 to 29 November 1986
Writers: Gerry Finley-Day, Frank Noble, Ken Noble, Scott Goodall, James Nicholas, P. Rudge, Peter Milligan, Alan McKenzie
Artists: Jim Watson, Vanyo, Geoff Campion, Ron Turner, James Bleach, John Cooper, Josep Gual, Tony Coleman, Manuel Carmona, Enrique Badía Romero

Baron Ironblood plans to conquer the world with his huge army of brainwashed fanatical Red Shadows. Standing in his way is the multinational Action Force, divided into four branches - infantry unit Z-Force; special operations unit SAS Force; naval unit Q-Force; and space unit Space Force.

- Based on the Palitoy toyline of the same name, derived from Action Man. Changes in the toyline saw Cobra from G.I. Joe take over as primary villains from 1985. The series ended when the licence was transferred to Marvel UK, who rebooted Action Force with their own series in 1987.

== The Black Crow ==
Published: 23 October 1976 to 22 January 1977
Writer: Scott Goodall
Artists: Eric Bradbury, Bill Lacey

Codenamed The Black Crow, a British secret agent carries out perilous missions in German-held Europe while Gestapo officer Major Klaus von Steutsel attempts to stop him.

- Continued from Valiant.

== The Bootneck Boy ==
Published: 8 March 1975 to 12 November 1977
Writers: Ian McDonald, Gerry Finley-Day, John Wagner
Artist: Juan Giralt

Orphan Danny Budd has been reluctantly raised by his unpleasant uncle. He enlists in the Royal Marines where he is picked on because of his small physique, but remains determined to prove himself.

== Carver ==
A British military policeman investigates a murder in 1941 North Africa.

== Charley's War ==
Published: 6 January 1979 to 4 October 1986
Writers: Pat Mills, Scott Goodall
Artist: Joe Colquhoun

16-year-old Charley Bourne enlists in the British army during World War I, and soon finds out the truth of brutal trench warfare.

- Reprinted in Battle 11 October 1986 to 23 January 1988 and Eagle 30 January 1988.

== Clash of the Guards ==
Published: 26 September 1981 to 30 October 1982, 8 January to 23 April 1983
Writer: Alan Hebden
Artists: Cam Kennedy, Ron Tiner, Vanyo, Norma

During the Allied campaign in Italy in 1943 American Captain Brad Clash - a former Hollywood stuntman and speedway driver - is sent to join a British infantry platoon in order to observe their tactics and methods.

- Collected by Rebellion Developments in July 2023.

== Cold Steele ==
Published: 21 February to 27 March 1976
Writer: Gerry Finley-Day

Fighting the German invasion of Norway in 1940, Private Robert Steele is first torched by flamethrowers and then got frostbite. Unable to even pull the trigger of a gun, he fights on against the Nazis with just a bayonet.

- The story was a late replacement, and Finley-Day would later reflect it "wasn't the greatest strip".

== The Commando They Didn't Want ==
Published: 4 April 1981 to 13 February 1982
Writer: Terry Magee (as John Richard)
Artist: Carlos Pino

After his gun jams on a mission and his unit are massacred, Commando Joe Dixon is drummed out of the regiment and assigned to the non-combatant Pioneers.

== Cooley's Gun ==
Published:
Writer: Gerry Finley-Day
Artist: Geoff Campion

== Coward's Brand on Bradley ==
Published: 31 May to 30 August 1975
Writer: Robert Ede

New recruit Ben Bradley is framed as a coward in 1942 Burma after an incident that leaves him with a c-shaped scar on his forehead. Condemned to death, he escapes the firing squad and sets out to prove his innocence.

== Crazy Keller ==
Published: 15 July to 8 September 1978
Writer: Alan Hebden
Artist: Eric Bradbury

Captain Kermit Keller of the United States Army Signal Corps doesn't let anything get in the way of his destination, driving his jeep Scoot 3 through any Germans who try to hinder him.

== D-Day Dawson ==
Published: 8 March to 22 May 1975; 14 August 1976 to 22 January 1977
Writers: Gerry Finley-Day, Ron Carpenter, Alan Hebden, Robert Ede, Terry Magee, Eric Hebden
Artists: Annibale Casabianca, Geoff Campion, Colin Page, Mike Western, Bill Lacey, Jim Watson (Note: Due Battle not crediting creators until 1981 and incomplete records, credits may not be exhaustive)

British army sergeant Steve Dawson is wounded on the D-Day beaches by a bullet that is lodged near his heart, sealing his eventual doom. However, the doctor that diagnoses the injury is then killed and Dawson re-joins his unit with no one else aware of his terminal condition, having decided to fight with his platoon until the end.

- The two runs were reprinted in Battle between 18 September 1982 and 22 October 1983 and 7 January to 5 May 1984, respectively.

== Darkie's Mob ==
Published: 14 August 1976 to 18 June 1977
Writer: John Wagner
Artist: Mike Western

In the jungles of Burma, the renegade Captain Joe Darkie leads a group of lost soldiers in a personal guerrilla war against the Japanese.

- Reprinted in Battle 21 March and December 1981, and Judge Dredd Megazine #202 to #210. Collected by Titan Comics in 2011.

== Death Squad ==
Published: 12 July 1980 to 4 June 1981
Writer: Alan Hebden (as Mark Andrew)
Artist: Eric Bradbury

A motley band of German soldiers serve in a penal battalion on the Eastern Front.

- Reprinted in Battle 31 January 1987 to 23 January 1988.

== Destroyer! ==
Published: 15 November 1975 to 27 March 1976
Writer: Ron Carpenter
Artist: Jim Watson

Commander 'Shiny' Knight is given command of the destroyer HMS Sword. Initially his particular ways and high standards seem set to rub the crew the wrong way but he soon proves to be an inspirational and fearless leader.

== Dredger ==
Published: 19 November 1977 to 7 October 1978
Writers: Kelvin Gosnell, Tom Tully, Alan Hebden, Chris Lowder
Artist: John Cooper

- Continued from Action.

== The Eagle ==
Published: 8 March 1975 to 18 June 1977, to 14 March 1981
Writers: Eric Hebden, Robert Ede, Pat Mills, John Wagner, Gerry Finley-Day, Chris Lowder, Ron Carpenter, Kelvin Gosnell
Artists: Pat Wright, Barrie Mitchell, Geoff Campion, Vanyo, Francisco Masip, Bill Lacey, Jim Watson

Britain's top secret agent - Mike Nelson of the Special Operations Executive, codenamed The Eagle - parachutes into occupied France in 1943. His mission is to kill Adolf Hitler.

== Fight for the Falklands ==
Published: 18 September 1982 to 19 March 1983
Writer: John Wagner
Artist: Jim Watson

Argentine forces invade the Falkland Islands, and Prime Minister Margaret Thatcher dispatches a British taskforce to retake the dependency.

== Fighter from the Sky ==
Published: 3 April to 7 August 1976
Writer: Gerry Finley-Day
Artist: Geoff Campion

In 1939, German paratrooper Paul Fallman is demoted back to private after his father is executed for treason, and becomes determined to restore honour to his family name.

== Fighting Mann ==
Published: 12 July 1980 to 19 September 1981
Writer: Alan Hebden
Artist: Cam Kennedy

A veteran US Marine Colonel embarks on an unauthorised mission in the Vietnam War to locate his son - a Navy pilot who has gone missing and has been accused of desertion.

- Reprinted in Battle 24 January 1987 to 23 January 1988. Collected by Titan Comics in August 2016 as part of Garth Ennis Presents: Battle Classics Volume Two.

== The Fists of Jimmy Chiang ==
Published: 27 February 1982 to 19 March 1983
Writer: Scott Goodall
Artist: Eric Bradbury

Hong Kong martial arts expert Jimmy Chang battles organised crime and Communist agents using his kung fu skills.

== The Flight of the Golden Hinde ==
Published: 8 March to 24 May 1976
Writer: Charles Herring, Pat Mills, John Wagner, Scott Goodall

James Finch is captain of a replica of Sir Francis Drake's Golden Hind that sets sail in 1937 aiming to circumnavigate the world to commemorate the 360th anniversary of Drake's 1577 voyage. The ship is still at sea when the war breaks out in 1939. Finch disobeys an order to return to Britain, and instead decides to complete the voyage.

== The Fortrose Falcon ==
Published: 31 May to 9 August 1975
Writer: John Wagner, Eric Hebden
Artist: Andrea Bresciani, Vanyo, John Stokes

The history of the Scottish Fortrose clan and their falcon mascot from 1743 to 1943.

== Gaunt ==
Published: 25 June to 12 November 1977
Writer: John Wagner, Pat Mills
Artist: John Cooper

An unbalanced secret agent is given a superhumanly strong artificial hand to replace one lost during torture.

- Reprinted in Eagle 27 December 1984 to 30 March 1985

== The General Dies at Dawn ==
Published: 14 October to 23 December 1978
Writer: Alan Hebden
Artist: John Cooper

A Wehrmacht General, due to be executed for treason, spends his final hours describing his wartime experiences to the sympathetic guard outside his cell.

- The story was collected in Garth Ennis Presents: Battle Classics by Titan Comics in 2014.

== Glory Rider ==
Published: 6 January to 8 October 1979
Writer: Gerry Finley-Day
Artist: Geoff Campion, Carlos Cruz-Diez

Major Jeb Rider is in an American tank unit battling Germans in North Africa, and pins the blame for his rash actions during battle on the group's dead commanding officer. However, Tank-Sergeant Steve Hilts knows the truth of events.

- Reprinted in Battle 23 August 1986 to 17 January 1987. Finley-Day would later relate that Rider was partly inspired by George Patton.

== Hellman of Hammer Force ==
Published: 19 November 1977 to 8 July 1978
Writers: Gerry Finley-Day, Alan Hebden
Artists: Mike Dorey, Jim Watson, Pat Wright

Honourable Wehrmacht tank commander Major Kurt Hellman fights for Germany while opposing the brutal attitudes shown by the Nazi regime.

- Continued from Action.

== HMS Nightshade ==
Published: 6 January 1979 to
Writer: John Wagner
Artist: Mike Western & Ron Tiner

At the height of the Battle of the Atlantic, the crew of the British Royal Navy Corvette HMS Nightshade protect Allied supply convoys from German U-Boats.

- Reprinted in Battle 28 September 1985 to 16 August 1986. Two pages of each episode were inked by Tiner to enable Western to keep to a four-page weekly schedule, though Western was not keen on the approach. The story was collected in Garth Ennis Presents: Battle Classics by Titan Comics in 2014.

== Hold Hill 109 ==
Published: 29 May to 10 July 1976
Writers: Steve MacManus, Jim Watson
Artist: Jim Watson

A ragged group of 13 Eighth Army soldiers have to hold a vital hill against a vastly superior force of Afrika Korps for six days.

== The Hunters S.I.6 ==
Published: 27 February 1982 to 12 January 1985
Writer: Terry Magee (as John Richard), Brian Burrell
Artists: Carlos Pino, Francisco Masip, Manuel Carmona

A pair of secret agents, Ned Hare and Larry Fox, battle threats to national security whilst maintaining their cover as actors in a TV show where they also play secret agents.

== Invasion! ==
Published:24 January to 29 August 1987
Writer: Terry Magee
Artist: Jim Watson

A young boy finds himself caught up in the 1982 Falklands War.

== Invasion 1984! ==
Published: 26 March to 31 December 1983
Writers: John Wagner and Alan Grant (as R. Clark)
Artists: Eric Bradbury

When a race of skeletal-like aliens invade the world and enslave humanity British special forces unit 'Storm Squad' lead the fightback.

- Collected by Rebellion Developments in 2019.

== Jetblade ==
Published: 1 January to 1 October 1983
Writer/s: Alan Hebden
Artist/s: John Vernon

The adventures of an advanced prototype jet-assisted helicopter as the crew perform demonstration missions for prospective buyers worldwide.

== Joe Two Beans ==
Published: 29 January 1977 to 1 April 1978
Writers: John Wagner, Scott Goodall
Artist: Eric Bradbury

A Blackfoot Native American serves in the United States Marine Corps in the Pacific War.

== Johnny Red ==
Published: 29 January 1977 to 17 January 1987
Writer: Tom Tully, James Nicholas
Artists: Joe Colquhoun, John Cooper, Carlos Pino

British fighter pilot Johnny "Red" Redburn starts flying for the Russians in a Hawker Hurricane fighter. Later, Redburn flies with the RAF and USAAF in England before returning to the Eastern Front in a Hawker Typhoon nicknamed The Red Death.

- Reprinted in Battle 24 January 1987 to 23 January 1988 and Eagle 30 January to 14 October 1988. Four collected editions of the strip were issued by Titan Comics between 2010 and 2016.

== King of the Yanks ==
Published: 19 July to 8 November 1975
Writer: Ron Carpenter
Artist: Stanley Houghton

RAF pilot Jeff King is placed in charge of a USAAF squadron but his new charges are convinced he is a jinx.

== Kommando King ==
Published:
Writer: Gerry Finley-Day
Artist: Cam Kennedy, Geoff Campion

German-born American Joe King gets accused of treachery and heads to join the Brandenburgers under Wilhelm Canaris to redeem the family name.

== Lofty's One-Man Luftwaffe ==
Published: 8 March to 3 July 1975
Writers: Pat Mills, John Wagner, Ken Armstrong
Artists: Paulo Ongaro, Stanley Haughton

British pilot Dave 'Lofty' Banks speaks fluent German, and is shot down over Occupied Europe in 1943. He escapes from a POW camp and assumes the identity of a dead German pilot. Lofty ends up serving in the Luftwaffe, working to sabotage his squadron from within.

- Reprinted in Battle 17 October 1987 to 23 January 1988. In June 2018 a complete reprint of the story was included as a bonus supplement with Judge Dredd Megazine #379.

== Major Eazy ==
Published: 10 January to 27 March 1976, 15 May 1976 to 22 January 1977, 19 November 1977 to 10 June 1978
Writer: Alan Hebden
Artists: Carlos Ezquerra, Ron Tiner

With his shaggy hair, Bentley and laidback attitude the anti-authoritarian Major Eazy seems an unlikely soldier - until he goes into action.

- Reprinted in Battle 2 July to 22 October 1983. Titan Comics collected the first batch of strips as Major Eazy: Heart of Iron in 2010, with the same material issued by Rebellion Developments as Major Eazy: The Italian Campaign in 2021.

== Major Eazy versus Rat Pack ==
Published: 29 January to 23 April 1977
Writer/s: Alan Hebden
Artist/s: Carlos Ezquerra

With Major Taggart recovering from injuries inflicted by the Gestapo, Major Eazy is placed in charge of the Rat Pack.

- Collected by Rebellion Developments in 2020.

== Merrill's Marauders ==
Published: 15 November 1975 to 27 March 1976
Writer: Eric Hebden
Artist: Geoff Campion, Mike Western

A unit of American soldiers tries to fend off the Japanese advance in the early days of the war in the Pacific.

== El Mestizo ==
Published: 4 June to 17 September 1977
Writer: Alan Hebden
Artist: Carlos Ezquerra

In 1862 a former slave turned bounty hunter returns from Mexico to America at the height of the Civil War.

- Collected by Rebellion Developments in 2018.

== The Nightmare ==
Published: 19 January 1985 to 11 October 1986
Writers: Barrie Tomlinson, Terry Magee (early episodes as John Richard)
Artists: Mario Capaldi, Jesus Redondo

A boy of The Blitz is pursued by a Nazi assassin. }

== One-Eyed Jack ==
Published: 23 October 1976 to 28 May 1977
Writers: Scott Goodall, Chris Lowder
Artist: John Cooper

Detective Jack McBane leaves the NYPD to join military intelligence.

- Continued from Valiant.

== Operation Shark ==
Published: 14 August to 16 October 1976, 15 July to 23 December 1978
Writers: Brian Bullen, Tom Tully
Artists: Mike Western, Vanyo, Mike Dorey, Alex Henderson

With the Channel Islands occupied by Nazi Germany in 1940, four schoolboys begin a resistance movement.

== Panzer G-Man ==
Published: 23 October 1976 to 18 June 1977
Writer: Gerry Finley-Day
Artists: Geoff Campion, Jim Watson

Panzer-Grenadier Kurt Slinger fights not only against the Allies but against deadly rivals among his own comrades.

- Reprinted in Battle 2 July to 1 October 1983.

== Rat Pack ==
Published: 8 March 1975 to 7 August 1976, 30 April to 17 June 1977, 17 June to 8 July 1978
Writers: Terry Magee, Eric Hebden, Gerry Finley-Day, Peter Harris, S. Cornforth, Ken Mennell, R. Marsh, Alan Hebden, Brian Bullen
Artists: Carlos Ezquerra, Alan Philpott, Ken Houghton, Colin Page, Massimo Belardinelli, Johnny Johnson, Eduardo Freio, Bill Lacey, Vanyo, John Cooper, Eric Bradbury

Major Taggart of the British Army recruits four condemned soldiers - burly Cypriot Kabuk 'The Turk' Hasan, safe cracker Ronald Weasel, Scots powerhouse Ian "Scarface" Rogan and Commando Matthew Dancer - for near-suicidal missions in return for a chance of freedom.

- The first batch of stories were collected by Titan Comics in 2010 as Rat Pack: Guns, Guts & Glory.

== Rattling Rommel ==
Published: 10 July to 7 August 1976
Writer: Alan Hebden (as Mark Andrew)
Artist:

The escapades of a seemingly sentient Rolls Royce scout car.

== The Red Baron ==
Published: 24 September to 5 November 1977
Writer: Roy Orlandini
Artist: Jim Watson

Baron Manfred von Richthofen quickly becomes the most feared German pilot in the skies above the Western Front.

== Ryan's Revenge ==
Published: 14 February to 8 May 1976
Writer: Ron Carpenter
Artist: Jim Watson

John Ryan trains as a flight sergeant in RAF Coastal Command to get revenge after U-Boats kill his brother.

== Samurai ==
Published: 15 July to 9 September 1978
Writer: Pat Mills
Artist: Carlos Cruz-Diez

== The Sarge ==
Published: 25 June 1977 to 16 December 1978, 6 January to 29 October 1979
Writers: Gerry Finley-Day, Scott Goodall
Artists: Mike Western, Jim Watson, Phil Gascoine, Matías Alonso, Geoff Campion

A veteran of World War I, British Sergeant Jim Masters has to shepherd his rookie, over-confident platoon during the Second World War.

- Reprinted in Battle 13 October 1984 to 21 September 1985. The first batch of stories were collected by Rebellion Developments in 2022.

== Sea Wolf ==
Published: 25 June to 12 November 1977
Writers: Stuart Wales, Geoff Kemp
Artist: Pat Wright

U-159 captain Kurt Wolf wages war on Atlantic convoys while avoiding a Nazi fanatic among his own crew who wants him dead.

== Sergeant Without Stripes ==
Published: 6 September to 8 November 1975
Writers: Norman Worker, Gerry Finley-Day, Pat Mills
Artist: Giancarlo Alessandrini

After a spat with green but well-connected Lieutenant Flashley, Bill Saxon is busted down from sergeant to the ranks. The platoon still respect him however and he must do all he can to stop Flashley's inexperience from getting them all killed.

== Skreamer of the Stukas ==
Published: 16 September to 23 December 1978
Writer: Gerry Finley-Day

Lieutenant Otto Skreamer is a ruthless and cruel Junkers Ju 87 pilot in the Luftwaffe during World War II. Jimmy Fletcher, a young British boy, loses his father to Skreamer in the Dunkirk evacuation and vows revenge on the dive-bomber pilot.

== Soldier Sharp: The Rat of the Rifles ==
Published: 23 October 1976 to 22 January 1977
Writer: Scott Goodall
Artist: Joe Colquhoun

As the Allies liberate France in 1944, Cockney loudmouth Arnie Sharp's cowardice gets most of his unit killed, but circumstances see him incorrectly recognised as a hero. Only his badly-injured childhood acquaintance Sammy Little survives with knowledge of the truth.

- Continued from Valiant.

== The Spinball Wars ==
Published: 19 November 1977 to 3 November 1979
Writer: Tom Tully
Artist: Ron Turner

The Black Gladiators spinball team are trained as a covert missions group, with their cover being as the official US Army spinball outfit.

- Continuation of "Spinball" from Action.

== Storm Force ==
Published: 24 January 1987 to 23 January 1988
Writers: James Nicholas, Scott Goodall
Artists: Vanyo, John Cooper

The Mole commands anti-terrorist unit Storm Force - consisting of Storm, Stiletto, Magnus, Griffin, Mikron and Porcupine - against foes including Tarantula and the Web Masters.

- Continued in Eagle.

== The Team That Went To War ==
Published: 3 April to 7 August 1976
Writer: Tom Tully
Artists: Mike Western, Jim Watson

After a Luftwaffe kills civilians on the street of their home town, the staff of First Division football team Barchester United sign up for the war effort.

- Later reprinted in Roy of the Rovers.

== Terror Behind the Bamboo Curtain ==
Published: 8 March to 24 May 1975
Writer: Charles Herring, PMJW, Tom Tully
Artist: Giancarlo Alessandrini

British troops in a Japanese POW camp in Burma which is run by a sadistic commander who performs cruel punishments and experiments on his prisoners.

- Later reprinted in the 1980 Tornado Annual.

== They Can't Stop Bullet! ==
Published: 16 August to 1 November 1975
Writer: Pat Mills, John Wagner, Robert Ede
Artist: Rafael Boluda Vidal

After escaping a POW camp on a captured German motorcycle, dispatch rider Nick "Bullet" Carter is equipped with a custom Zundapp 750 bike and carries out crucial scouting missions for British Intelligence.

- David Bishop called the concept a "blatant swipe of Steve McQueen's character in The Great Escape".

== Truck Turpin ==
Published: 27 February to 25 December 1982
Writer: Alan Hebden
Artist: John Vernon

Tom 'Truck' Turpin, a British trucker, drives a Kenworth rig across the United States during the Seventies, accompanied by his co-driver & sidekick 'Jacknife'.

== The Unknown Soldier ==
Published: 14 August to 16 October 1976
Writer: Ron Carpenter
Artist: Jim Watson

After an attempt on his life leaves him with amnesia a British soldier is unaware his own commanding officer wants him dead.

== War Dog ==
Published: 29 December 1979 to 5 July 1980Writer Alan Hebden
Artist/s: Cam Kennedy

German Shepherd Kazan experiences World War II from different sides.

== The Wilde Bunch ==
Published: 3 January 1981 to
Writer: Scott Goodall
Artist: Phil Gascoine

The oldest of the Wilde Brothers tries to use his role as a dispatch rider to keep his three brothers safe after they enlist in 1941.

== X-Changers ==
Published: September 1987 to 23 January 1988

In the Westarr Complex planetary system, Star Marshall Colt Lazeor and his allies Alpha Cody and Buck Meteor keep order against the outlaw Blackstarr and his minions.

- Based on the Acamas toyline.

== Y for Yellow Squadron ==
Published: 15 November 1975 to 14 February 1976
Writer: Ken Mennell, Ron Carpenter
Artist: Bill Lacey

Squadron Leader David 'Big Dave' Challinor is put in charge of a squadron of RAF misfits and malingerers.

== Yellow Jack ==
Published: 14 August to 16 October 1976
Writer: Terry Magee
Artist: Geoff Campion, Jim Watson

Cowardly British soldier Jack Loot hungers for gold in the North African desert war.
