= Kids Rule O.K. =

British comic book story

- "Kids Rule O.K." on the cover of the 18 September 1976 edition of Action.
- Publisher: IPC Magazines
- Publication date: 11 September – 16 October 1976
- Genre: Science fiction
- Title(s): Action; 11 September to 16 October 1976
- Main character(s): Ray Spencer; Benny; Mick Roker

Creative team
- Writer: Chris Lowder
- Artist: Mike White
- Editor: John Smith

"Kids Rule O.K." is a British comic science fiction adventure story published in the weekly anthology Action from 11 September to 16 October 1976 by IPC Magazines.

The strip concerns a near-future environmental disaster which kills off 90 percent of the world's adult population, leaving Britain under the control of roaming gangs of teenagers. "Kids Rule O.K." was published at the height of the British tabloid press-led moral panic over the contents of Action, and further stoked the outcry. As a result, the comic was suspended from publication after 16 October 1976, with just seven episodes of "Kids Rule O.K." published. When the sanitised Action returned to publication in December 1976 the strip was not continued.

== Creation ==
IPC Magazines' new Action comic had already drawn critical articles in the likes of The Sun, Evening Standard and Daily Mail newspapers for its violence, moral depravity and anarchic attitude. The comic was an instant sales success however, and underwent the standard IPC method of dropping stories unpopular with readers in favour of new material. Boxing story "Blackjack" had been with the anthology since it debuted in February 1976 and outlived several others but began to decline in popularity and was effectively voted out in summer 1976 as it fell behind additions like "Look Out for Lefty" and "Death Game 1999". The idea for a replacement was devised by writer Chris Lowder, (Note: Often referred to under his pseudonym Jack Adrian.) who had worked on the editorial staff of the defunct Lion but had been one of the few extant staff writers to respond well to the changes Action creators Pat Mills and Geoff Kemp had implemented. Lowder had already contributed episodes of "Blackjack" and "Dredger", as well as writing trucking drama "Hell's Highway" for Action.

Lowder drew inspiration from William Golding's novel Lord of the Flies, and his original story notes outlined some of his thoughts: -

I'd like to get into this story a real Lord of the Flies atmosphere. The savagery of the kids who've had the reins taken off them. No discipline. No one bothering about anything, because there's stacks of supplies, petrol, canned food, and so on, left. Why think about tomorrow?... until something really drastic happens that convinces Ray that they can't go on like this... They've got to do it all themselves, and it's no joke from now on.

— Chris Lowder, quoted by Martin Baker, "11. When the Crumblies flipped it: Kids Rule OK...?", Action - The Story of a Violent Comic (11 August 1990)

To make the protagonists - a gang of youths led by a boy called Ray - more sympathetic, Lowder created an authoritarian threat in the form of police cadets, a group with a neo-fascist desire to take over the running of the beleaguered country. Working titles included "Kids' Power", "Lords of London", "After the Oldies Died" and "Dear Dad" before the final name was settled on. Lowder requested to be paired with artist Mike White due to their good working relationship with on "Hell's Highway", and editor John Smith complied.

== Publishing history ==
For the third chapter of the story, "Kids Rule O.K." was selected to appear on the comic's cover. Carlos Ezquerra, a Spanish artist who had already made a popular impact with readers on Battle Picture Weekly strips such as "Rat Pack" and "Major Eazy". He contributed an image of Ray wielding a chain as he led an army of kids with similar improvised weaponry into combat against a background of urban destruction. In the foreground an adult cowered, while a police helmet was among the debris. In true comic book fashion, the cover only had a passing resemblance to the events of the instalment inside, which featured no adults - police or otherwise - and combat with shotguns rather than the more accessible chains and pipes wielded in the image. Nevertheless, the cover was seized upon by Action's detractors as featuring a gang of teenagers attacking a helpless police officer. Ezquerra for his part has always maintained the police helmet was not connected to the prone adult, pointing to the lack of similarity between his clothing and a police uniform, and that the colourist made an error in colouring them the same blue. The same issue featured an issue of football strip "Look Out for Lefty" where the title character's girlfriend threw an empty coke bottle onto the pitch during a game, leading to press claims that the strip was endorsing hooliganism.

Action creator Pat Mills, who had moved away from the title to work on creating 2000 AD, would later use the cover to illustrate his belief that the comic rapidly went too far under Smith, later recalling:

...when I saw the Kids Rule OK cover, I went white with shock. I knew it was asking for trouble, but everyone at Action was laughing because "we'd finally shocked Pat."

— Pat Mills, quoted by Stephen Jewell, "The Sevenpenny Nightmare!", Judge Dredd Megazine #379 (17 January 2017)

The clamour for changes was such that IPC's editorial director John Sanders, who had rigorously defended the comic in the press, was called onto BBC magazine programme Nationwide and was charged with amoral motives by host and BDSM enthusiast Frank Bough. The IPC board, already wary of Action due to the press attention and internal conflict, ordered Action withdrawn after the 16 October 1976 edition. In a press statement about the withdrawal, managing editor Johnny Johnson stated the comic would be retooled and no stories would be dropped. However, when it returned on 4 December 1976 "Kids Rule O.K." was absent without explanation, and would not return before the comic was cancelled in November 1977.

This was despite five more episodes of the story being completed to bring it to a conclusion; these were retained in the IPC archive and examined by author Martin Barker during production of Action - The Story of a Violent Comic for Titan Books. He noted that even though no serious work seemed to have been done to rework "Kids Rule - O.K." for publication unlike with stories such as "Hook Jaw" and "Look Out for Lefty", the art still showed signs of censorship and heavy rewriting, particularly with a sudden ending that seemed to go against the grain of the story. He felt the latter was evidence that even before the title was suspended there were plans to curtail it, regardless of popularity with the readers; Lowder has suggested since that he was having trouble working out where the story was going and was leaning towards finishing it off swiftly. While opposed to the treatment of Action, Barker conceded "It's not difficult to see why this would be an unwise thing to publish", and drew particular attention to the planned cover for the conclusion - based on casual research from Lowder asking teenagers what they'd do if in power of the country - of Mick on the throne, festooned with the crown jewels as an image likely to have caused further controversy. Both the published and unpublished episodes of "Kids Rule - O.K." were included in Action - The Story of a Violent Comic, though Barker would make the tongue-in-cheek comment that he was tempted to suppress the concluding episode due to its trite nature.

Since 2016 the rights to "Kids Rule O.K." have been owned by Rebellion Developments.

In 2018 the universe of "Kids Rule - O.K." was revisited as an alternate dimension in a "Death Wish" back-up strip in The Vigilant, which featured Blake Edmonds meeting a parallel reality version of himself.

== Plot summary ==
In 1986, a drastic increase in pollution affects the metabolism of nine-tenths of the world's adult population, causing near-instant heart failure. Only those under 20 and a few isolated cases are able to survive. In London, roaming gangs of kids prowl the streets, and the handful of surviving adults become a despised minority - nicknamed 'Crumblies' by the kids. One of the gangs is the Malvern Road Mob, led by the bullying Mick Roker. Tired of Mick's needless cruelty, gang member Ray Spencer challenges him to a knife-fight, only for the duel to be broken up by a gang of West End bikers. The two factions of the Malvern Road Mob find a cache of weapons and a brutal civil war breaks out between them while the bikers attack both groups. Ray and his friend Benny realise the two gangs have to work together, but the gang escape a siege at Malvern Road school Mick attempts to kill Ray as they escape the burning building. Ray survives and decides to leave his faction to set up a new territory on Baker Street, out of the way of both the bikers and Mick's loyalists. However, on their journey through the disused London Underground they find themselves opposed by a brutal group of police cadets.

Battle soon breaks out between Ray's gang and the police cadets, and he is knocked out and drawn before Chief Inspector Ronald Stryde at Quex Road Police Station, who plans to use his inherited authority to return law and order to Britain. He has Ray viciously beaten by the cadets when he objects. Ray escapes and busts out the rest of the gang with fireworks from the evidence room, and the gang finds a working double-decker bus to escape the area. However, they are spotted by Ray and his cronies. However, a more reasonable police inspector has also survived and brings both groups to Scotland Yard and persuades them to make peace, turn in their weapons and take a more constructive role in rebuilding the country.

== Collected editions ==
Title	ISBN	Publisher	Release date	Contents
Action - The Story of a Violent Comic	9781852860233	Titan Books	11 August 1990	Material from Action 14 February to 16 October 1976

== Reception ==
Barker's criticism of the pat ending of the unpublished material has been echoed by Moose Harris, who described it as "awful, truly the worst thing never to be printed in Action". He did also concede that while the story was enjoyable it did suffer from a lack of direction.
