= Dredger (comics) =

British comic book story

- Dredger on the cover of the 11 September 1976 edition of Action.
- Publisher: IPC Magazines
- Publication date: 14 February 1976 – 7 October 1978
- Genre: Spy
- Title(s): Action; 14 February to 16 October 1976; 4 December 1976 to 12 November 1977; Battle Action; 19 November 1977 to 7 October 1978
- Main character(s): Dredger; Simon Breed

Creative team
- Writer(s): Kelvin Gosnell; Pat Mills; Steve MacManus; Chris Lowder; Geoffrey Kemp; Stewart Wales; Gerry Finley-Day; Terry Magee; Tom Tully; Alan Hebden
- Artist(s): Horacio Altuna; Fred Holmes; Leandro Sesarego; Ricardo Villagrán; Jordi Badía Romero; Jesús Blasco; Geoff Campion; John Cooper
- Editor(s): Geoff Kemp; John Smith; Sid Bicknell; Dave Hunt

"Dredger" is a British comic action story published in the weekly anthologies Action and Battle Action from 14 February 1976 to 7 October 1978 by IPC Magazines. The strip focused on the eponymous, uncompromising secret agent and his partner Breed, featuring self-contained stories that featured Dredger getting out of lethal situations with an innovative and violent approach.

== Creation ==
Left with a short time to create an all-new comic for IPC Magazines and a shortage of suitable writers, Pat Mills and Geoff Kemp soon hit on a formula of repurposing elements of popular films. The character of Harry Callahan from the Dirty Harry film series - which had recently released a third successful instalment, The Enforcer was the inspiration for Dredger, who was then transplanted into the spy genre. Part of the comic's tough image was the cachet from basing the stories on movies that themselves were largely unavailable to readers due to their certification. DI Jack Regan from The Sweeney - hugely popular with boys of Action's demographic, despite its post-watershed timeslot - and Mills would later admit the design of the strip's logo was based on that of the TV series. Much of the strip's development was undertaken by Gerry Finley-Day, who came up with the name, though it was Mills' idea to pair the maverick agent with old Etonian sidekick Breed. He chose this relationship to "reverse the stereotypes and have working-class heroes", an ethos he attempt to instil in the rest of Action. He would later deny that Dredger's name was the inspiration for the name of Judge Dredd, who was instead named after the ska musician. Finley-Day also listed Starsky & Hutch as an influence. Veteran artist Geoff Campion worked on the character's design.

Mills also insisted on making "Dredger" consist of standalone stories in response to what he perceived as comics stories that "were taking the piss out of readers with these endless spun-out cliffhangers". The strip was laid out by Action's art director Doug Church

== Publishing history ==
The demanding nature of the all-in-one work required for "Dredger" saw it quickly burn through writers, with initial scribe Kelvin Gosnell soon making way for contributions from the likes of Steve MacManus, Chris Lowder and Stewart Wales taking turns, along with Mills and Kemp themselves. Mills would recall "It was bloody hard work, and I must have been mad to do it as it was like coming up with a complete novella in three pages!".

Like much of Action, "Dredger" soon gathered mainstream press disapproval for its violent and nihilistic content. Lowder would later admit "some of the Dredgers I did were mainly shock-for-shock's sake", noting that one of his contributions was created around the image of Dredger shooting a priest; another, where Dredger bit out the throat of a guard dog, was rejected by editor John Smith. Church meanwhile worked on another episode with Mills that revolved around Dredger decapitating an opponent during a train-top fight. As a result of such outrageous, twist-filled storytelling "Dredger" was second only to "Hook Jaw" as the most popular story in Action's early line-up. An episode by Gosnell which featured a character being dissolved with acid pumped through a shower attracted criticism from tabloid newspaper The Sun, which was at the time moving towards becoming the country's best-selling newspaper due to an editorial decision to start printing topless pictures of young models, many of whom were under 18.

While the comic was hugely popular, the press clamour against the comic reached a pitch that saw the IPC board finally order Action be withdrawn while it was extensively overhauled after the 16 October edition. The comic returned in December, with "Dredger" still in the line-up but with its violence heavily toned down and any Cold War political commentary excised; some episodes produced but unpublished before the suspension were later reused after heavy editings. While it remained one of the more popular strips in the comic relatively speaking, the more traditionalist editorial direction of veteran Sid Bicknell (who had been parachuted in to replace the scapegoated Smith) saw Action rapidly lose sales before being cancelled in November 1977. "Dredger" was one of three strips to survive the merger with war comic Battle Picture Weekly, with the strip killing off Breed in the first episode, setting Dredger off on a hunt for his killer. John Cooper took over as permanent artist when the story moved to what was now called Battle Action, the arrival of "Dredger" having effectively curtailed his previous assignment of another spy strip, "Gaunt". "Dredger" would continue for another 11 months before being replaced by "The General Dies at Dawn". MacManus felt that despite the quality of "Dredger" it was a mistake to dilute Battle's all-war content with the stories from Action.

Due to its standalone format "Dredger" was suited to reprinting, and pre-ban episodes were included in the short-lived 1987 all-reprint title All-Action Monthly, as well as the 1988 224-page softback Big Adventure Book. In 1991 selected episodes of "Dredger" were included in Martin Barker's Action - The Story of a Violent Comic, published by Titan Books.

Since 2016 the rights to "Death Game 1999", "Spinball" and "The Spinball Wars" have been owned by Rebellion Developments. In spring 2020 Rebellion published an Action Special 2020 under its Treasury of British Comics imprint. The special included a new "Dredger" strip by Zina Hutton and Staz Johnson. In June 2022 Rebellion followed up with a hardcover Battle Action Special with new stories featuring characters from both comics, all written by Ennis and featuring another new "Dredger" strip. This had a more positive reception.

== Plot summary ==
In 1973, the hard-case former Royal Marine Dredger joins British intelligence agency D.I.6, being partnered with public schoolboy Simon Breed. The taciturn, enigmatic Dredger immediately makes himself a name as a relentless maverick, stopping assassinations, aircraft hijackings, kidnappers, East German Secret Police, Soviet spies and more, rarely hesitating to use his Magnum .44 to solve problems and leaving a trail of destruction for his superiors to clean up.

== Reception ==
In a study on British comics, James Chapman felt "Dredger" was a good strip but that much of its violence was gratuitous, and like several strips in Action was hard to defend from criticism in this regard.
