= Death Game 1999 =

British comic book story

"Death Game 1999" "Spinball" "The Spinball Wars"
- Joe Taggart playing Spinball on the cover of the unissued 23 October 1976 edition of Action; art by Massimo Belardinelli.
- Publisher: IPC Magazines
- Publication date: 8 May 1976 – 3 November 1979
- Genre: Science fiction
- Title(s): Death Game 1999; Action; 8 May to 16 October 1976; Spinball; Action; 4 December 1976 to 12 November 1977; Spinball Wars; Battle Action; 19 November 1977 to 3 November 1979
- Main character(s): Joe Taggart; Yo-Yo Devine; Al Rico; Bull Kruger; Henry Smailes

Creative team
- Writer: Tom Tully
- Artist(s): Costa; Ian Gibson; Mike White; Massimo Belardinelli; Ron Turner
- Editor(s): Geoff Kemp; John Smith; Sid Bicknell; Dave Hunt

"Death Game 1999" is a British comic science fiction/sport story published in the weekly anthologies Action and Battle Action from 8 May 1976 to 3 November 1979 by IPC Magazines.

The story is centred around a highly violent gladiatorial futuristic sport reminiscent of Rollerball, played by convicted prisoners. Following the controversy which saw Action withdrawn from sale in October 1976, the story was retooled as the less violent "Spinball". After Action was folded into war comic Battle in 1977, the story was renamed a second time as "The Spinball Wars".

== Creation ==
Devised by Action co-creator Geoff Kemp, "Death Game 1999" was heavily inspired by the successful science fiction film Rollerball; Roger Corman's Death Race 2000 has also been suggested as an influence. Part of the comic's appeal and image was featuring such stories when the movies themselves were largely unavailable to readers due to their certification. While Action had aimed to blood new writers, the story was written by the experienced Tom Tully, who had written the likes of "Kelly's Eye", "The Steel Claw" and "Mytek the Mighty" for Valiant in the 1960s, and had become one of the main writers of "Roy of the Rovers". However, he had shown he could adapt to the newer style Action was looking for with "The Team That Went To War" in Battle Picture Weekly. Like many of the stories in Action the art was farmed out to one of the European agencies used by IPC; in this case Alberto Giolitti's studio in Rome assigned Costa to the strip, though Ian Gibson contributed some of his earliest professional work to the first chapter.

== Publishing history ==
The strip debuted in the 8 May 1976 issue of Action, taking over from Steve MacManus' athletics drama "Sport's Not for Losers!". It was instantly popular with readers, but its violent nature only added to the growing press clamour against the comic. Action editor Steve MacManus would relate that children began their own version of the game, mounted on bicycles. After the conclusion of war story "Green's Grudge War" in September, Massimo Belardinelli was assigned to take over drawing the strip, which was nearing the conclusion of its initial story arc; Costa was moved across to "Dredger". However, in October the continuing moral panic about the comic saw IPC management withdraw the comic from sales after the October 16 edition. A cover by Belardinelli intended for the cancelled October 23 edition drew poor responses from editorial director John Sanders and the influential veteran Leonard Matthews and was ordered to be withdrawn; many of the completed pages intended for publication have been lost. It did not help that the planned cover used the word 'suicide' three times.

Over the next six weeks the comic was heavily retooled, with every page having to be signed off on by Sanders, and editor John Smith being replaced by old-school veteran Sid Bicknell. "Death Game 1999" was retitled "Spinball" and the violence was immediately toned down, with Belardinelli's artwork cannibalised as the storyline was hurriedly concluded in a single episode and redirected in a less acerbic, violent direction. Belardinelli would remain as artist for a short period before being moved over to work on the new version of "Dan Dare" for 2000 AD, with Costa returning to draw the story.

"Spinball" would continue in the much-sanitised Action, with Ron Turner taking over on art duty from September 1977, until falling sales saw it merged with Battle Picture Weekly as Battle Action. To fit in with that comic's war genre it was renamed again as "Spinball Wars" and retooled as a more military-orientated adventure story, running for another two years.

In 1991 the pre-ban episodes of "Death Game 1999" and a partial reconstruction of the unpublished episodes were included in Martin Barker's Action - The Story of a Violent Comic, published by Titan Books. Since 2016 the rights to "Death Game 1999", "Spinball" and "The Spinball Wars" have been owned by Rebellion Developments. In an interview with The Independent, Rebellion publisher Ben Smith subsequently identified "Death Game 1999" as one of the strips he would like to see reprinted.

== Plot summary ==
In the America of 1999, violent death sport spinball is the most popular in the world, having made American football obsolete. The game consists of two teams of seven, attempting to hit pins on a giant pinball table. The attacking team rides motorcycles to hit the pins, while the defending team are equipped with bladed skates and armed with projectile weapons. Lethal force is not only permissible but highly anticipated by the crowds, earning the sport the nickname 'the Meat Machine'. Due to the highly dangerous nature of the sport, it is contested by teams made up of prisoners slated for execution, with the incentive of the championship team earning parole. Due to the high popularity of the sport, the administration hands out death sentences for numerous offences and makes it difficult for players to escape.

=== Death Game 1999 ===
Former footballer Joe Taggart gets unwittingly involved in a robbery that leaves a ticket tout dead, and is imprisoned in the Karson City maximum security prison. This delights the prison's governor Henry Smailes, due to the prison's Karson City Killers spinball team having just lost its star player Al Rico to massive injuries in a 'Death Run' special event. Despite his reluctance, Taggart is coerced into joining up by Smailes' henchman warden 'Bull' Kruger, but decides to recruit a team from scratch closer to his principles, including Yo-Yo Devine - imprisoned for killing his landlord when his family was threatened. Taggart's attempts at playing the game with a minimum of sadism are unpopular with the spectators, and in response Smailes has Rico rebuilt as a bionic sociopath. Taggart, who is gaining acceptance from spinball fans, is attacked at the prison by Rico and after a long struggle leaves him for dead in a swamp. However, Smailes continues his attempts to have other players kill Taggart, as does the government as the outspoken player's public influence begins to rise. Kruger attempts to kill him with a bomb.

=== Spinball ===
However, Taggart survives the attack, allowing himself and Devine to win their freedom. As a result, the government separates the sport from the penal system. Initially Devine and Taggart enjoy their retirement, but ultimately return to spinball to counter the influence of Supersport International business tycoon Homer T. Kneagle by earning a place on his Kneagle's Eagles team. The pair later form their own team, the Black Gladiators.

=== The Spinball Wars ===
In 2001 the Black Gladiators were recruited to work as a team of trouble-shooters for the World Security Organisation, under the cover of being the organisation's spinball team.

== Collected editions ==
| Title | ISBN | Publisher | Release date | Contents |
|---|---|---|---|---|
| Action - The Story of a Violent Comic | 9781852860233 | Titan Books | 11 August 1990 | Material from Action 14 February to 16 October 1976 |

== Reception ==
Evaluation of "Death Game 1999" has mainly focused on its violence and subsequent censorship, though Jamie Chapman has argued there is a satirical element in the strip's commentary on the crowds baying for blood. The story's science-fantasy dressing has also seen it suggested as one of the stronger forerunners to 2000 AD in the pages of Action. Martin Barker also noted that Yo-Yo Devine was a still-rare example of a positive black character in British comics of the time, alongside Jack Barron from Action's boxing strip "Blackjack", and suggested this in itself may have been problematic for some of the older members of IPC staff. In a study of post-war British leisure activities, Stuart Hylton identified "Death Game 1999" as proof Action "set out to shock", while Moose Harris considered the post-suspension continuation an "insipid pretender".
