= Flesh (comics) =

British comic strip

- Created by: Pat Mills; Joan Solà-Segalés (a.k.a. Boix)

Publication information
- Publisher: Fleetway; Rebellion
- Schedule: Weekly
Title(s)
2000 AD #1-
- Formats: Original material for the series has been published as a strip in the comics anthology(s) 2000 AD.
- Genre: Science fiction
- Publication date: February 1977 – 2016

Creative team
- Writer(s): Pat Mills; Geoffrey Miller; Steve White/Dan Abnett; David Bishop/Steve MacManus

Reprints
- Collected editions
- Flesh: The Dino Files: ISBN 1-907992-26-X

Flesh is a recurring science fiction story in the British weekly anthology comic 2000 AD, created by writer Pat Mills and artist Boix.

== Publishing history ==
Flesh debuted in 2000 AD's first issue in 1977. The series was set in the age of dinosaurs who were farmed for their meat by cowboys from the future. The series was initially planned by Mills to be in Action, but after that title suffered censorship, Mills held the story back for his next project which eventually became 2000 AD.

The strip followed a similar path to Hook Jaw, one of the strips Mills had written in Action, in that it featured humans trying to dominate nature for their own purposes before falling prey to nature itself. Mills's original story's frontier setting was also influenced by Westworld, including tourists treating the dinosaurs as entertainment (coincidentally, Michael Crichton, the author of Westworld, later wrote Jurassic Park).

Flesh Book 1 ran for the first 19 issues of 2000 AD as well as the 1977 annual, and ending its run that year. While Flesh was popular, the series was not mentioned again until 1978 when Satanus, the son of Book 1's Tyrannosaurus antagonist Old One-Eye, appeared in the Judge Dredd story The Cursed Earth. The series was revived and returned with Flesh Book Two in issue 86, which was written by Kelvin Gosnell and primarily drawn by Massimo Belardinelli. The series gained popularity and ran until issue 99. Further books followed in issues 800–808 and 817–825, written by Mills and Tony Skinner with art by Carl Critchlow, and issues 973–979 written by Dan Abnett and Steve White with art by Gary Erskine and Simon Jacob.

After a 10-year absence from 2000 AD, Flesh returned in 2007 with "Hand of Glory", a prequel to the events of Book 1. 4 years later, Book 1's sequel, "Texas", appeared 2000 AD. This arc remained unfinished and was followed by the sequel "Midnight Cowboys" in 2012. Flesh again returned in 2013 with "Badlanders" which featured the return of Book 1 characters set before the conclusion of Book 2.

While Flesh Book 1 was published in black-and-white, Book 2 featured colour pages and dinosaurs covered in feathers—nearly 40 years before feathered dinosaurs became commonly accepted.

== Bibliography ==
The dinosaurs have made a number of appearances over the years:

- Flesh:
  - "Flesh, Book 1" (script by Pat Mills (1, 18–19), Ken Armstrong (2–4, 8), Studio Giolitti (5, 9, 10, 13) and Kelvin Gosnell (6–7, 11–12, 14–17); art by Boix (1–2, 8–10, 14), Ramon Sola (3–7, 10–12, 15–16, 19) and Felix Carrion (13, 17–18), in 2000 AD #1–19, 1977)
  - "Carrion" (2000AD Summer Special 1977)
  - "The Buffalo Hunt" (2000AD Annual 1978, 1977)
  - "Flesh, Book 2" (by Geoffrey Miller, Massimo Belardinelli (1–12) and Carlos Pino (13–14), in 2000 AD #86–99, 1978–1979)
- Judge Dredd: The Cursed Earth (by Pat Mills (1–10, 21–25), John Wagner (11–16, 19–20), Chris Lowder (17–18) and Mike McMahon/Brian Bolland, in 2000 AD #61–85, 1978)
- ABC Warriors: "Golgotha" (with Pat Mills and Carlos Ezquerra, in 2000 AD #119–139, 1979)
- Nemesis the Warlock: "Book V: The Vengeance of Thoth" (by Pat Mills and Bryan Talbot, in 2000 AD #435–445, 1986)
- Flesh:
  - "Legend of Shamana, Book 1" (by Pat Mills/Tony Skinner and Carl Critchlow, in 2000 AD #800–808, 1992)
  - "Legend of Shamana, Book 2" (by Pat Mills/Tony Skinner and Carl Critchlow, in 2000 AD #817–825, 1993)
  - "Chronocide" (by Steve White/Dan Abnett and Gary Erskine, in 2000 AD #973–979, 1996)
  - "Flesh 3000AD" (by David Bishop/Steve MacManus and Carl Critchlow, in 2000 AD #1034, 1997)
- Satanus: "Unchained!" (by Pat Mills and Colin MacNeil, in 2000 AD #1241–1246, 2001)
- Flesh:
  - "Hand of Glory" (by Pat Mills and Ramon Sola, in 2000 AD #1526, February 2007)
  - "Texas" (by Pat Mills and James Mckay, in 2000 AD #1724–1733, March–May 2011)
  - "Midnight Cowboys" (by Pat Mills and James Mckay, in 2000 AD #1774–1785, 2012)
  - "Badlanders" (by Pat Mills and James Mckay, in 2000 AD #1850–1861, 2013)
  - "Gorehead" (by Pat Mills and Clint Langley, in 2000 AD #2001–2010, 2016)

=== Collected editions ===
- Flesh: The Dino Files (collects "Book 1," "Book 2," "Hand of Glory," and "Texas", plus Bonus Thrills: "Carrion" and "The Buffalo Hunt", 272 pages, September 2011, Rebellion, ISBN 1-907992-26-X)

== Cast ==
=== Main characters ===
- Earl Reagan – Veteran dinosaur hunter and the anti-hero of the series.
- "Claw" Carver – Reagan's greedy rival. His weapon is a dinosaur claw, taken from the Deinonychus that bit off his hand. He is last seen being attacked (and presumably killed) by Big Hungry. However, it is possible that he survived, since he appears in subsequent issues.
- Vegas Carter – Daughter of Claw Carver and a prostitute. As an adult, she works as an executive for the corporation.

=== Allies ===
- Joe Brontowski – Cowboy from Reagan's team and the only one to survive Old One Eye's attack. Is killed by spiders in the meat processing plant.
- Doctor – A drunkard and gambler who is the only physician in Carver's town. Most of his patients die on the operating table.
- Jane B Goode – Ex prostitute who is Claw Carver's girlfriend and Vegas' mother.
- Boots McGurk – Vegas Carter's trail boss and an old friend of Reagan. Branded the Tyrannosaurus Gorehead with the number of the beast 666.
- Notch – A fat, bald dinosaur hunter with large muttonchop sideburns and a love of cigars. He cuts a notch into his body whenever he kills a dinosaur.
- Remuda – A Mexican with a wide-brimmed sombrero hat. He is the first of McGurk's group to be killed.
- Stand Alone Shareen – Cowgirl from McGurk's team with a reputation for being a man hater.
- Nailbomb – Shareen's boyfriend, a punk covered in tattoos and extreme body piercings. Is eaten by a Quetzalcoatlus pterosaur.

=== Enemies ===
==== Dinosaurs ====
- Old One Eye – 120-year-old matriarch of a pack of Tyrannosaurs. Her eye was gouged out by Reagan.
- Big Hungry – Giant Nothosaurus seeking revenge on Carver for killing his babies. A malfunctioning time portal sends him into modern times where he becomes the Loch Ness Monster.
- Gorehead – Tyrannosaur from Old One Eye's pack mutated by atom bomb.
- Satanus – Cloned son of Old One Eye, appears in Judge Dredd: The Cursed Earth.
- Golgotha – Son of Satanus and grandson of Old One Eye, appears in ABC Warriors: The Mek-nificent Seven.

==== Humans ====
- McZ – Detective and gunslinger resembling Buffalo Bill Cody who relentlessly pursues Carver for murdering a time controller.
- Flesh Controller – Corrupt corporate boss in charge of Base Nine, a meat packing plant that sends dinosaur flesh from the Cretaceous to the twenty-third century.
- J.M Grose – Greedy executive in charge of fishing rig Atlantis. He has a parrot that repeats his orders like Long John Silver's bird, Captain Flint.
- "Bull" Svensson – Captain of a fishing submarine. Is betrayed and drowned by Carver who hijacks the sub to reclaim his lost gold. His crew are named after characters from classic novels like Moby Dick, Treasure Island, and Twenty Thousand Leagues Under the Seas.
- Peters – The only sailor to remain loyal to Svensson. Is determined to bring Carver down.
- Gunner Ben – Old deckhand and friend of Peters. He is very superstitious and half insane.
- Preacher Sunday – Evil priest who believes the Cretaceous is Hell. He is actually a serial killer who strangles women, including Carver's girlfriend.

== See also ==
- Bloodfang
