= Look Out for Lefty! =

British comic book story

- 'Lefty' Lampton on the cover of the 18 December 1976 edition of Action.
- Publisher: IPC Magazines
- Publication date: 1 May 1976 – 12 November 1977
- Title(s): Action; 1 May to 16 October 1976; 4 December 1976 to 12 November 1977
- Main character(s): Ken 'Lefty' Lampton; Angie Roberts; Enoch Lampton; Mike Roberts; Sid Symthe; Mr. Gosling

Creative team
- Writer(s): Tom Tully
- Artist(s): Barrie Mitchell; Tony Harding
- Editor(s): Geoff Kemp; John Smith; Sid Bicknell

"Look Out for Lefty!" is a British comic sports story published in the weekly anthology Action from 1 May 1976 to 12 November 1977 by IPC Magazines. The strip focused aspiring footballer Kenny Lampton, nicknamed 'Lefty' due to his powerful left foot shot.

During the strip's publication Action encountered press outrage for its content. An episode of "Look Out for Lefty!" was particularly criticised for perceived encouragement of hooliganism, and shortly afterwards Action was pulled from sale and retooled.

== Creation ==
While Action creators Pat Mills and Geoff Kemp were eager to break the mould while putting together the new title they realised football stories were a staple of boys' comics and wanted to include one. Former DC Thomson writer Ken Carpenter was assigned to write it, coming up with "Play Till You Drop!". Mills in particular was unhappy with the strip, feeling it was too traditional in style - elements such as bribery had already been an element in numerous storylines in the likes of Tiger and Roy of the Rovers. However, with time running out before the launch the team were left with little option but to run it. Action was a strong sales success and while "Play Till You Drop!" was not among the comic's most popular strips, audience research found out that "The Coffin Sub" was universally disliked, so had to be the first story to be replaced.

However, Tom Tully was soon assigned to pitch a new football story. While Tully was an experienced old-school writer (including at the time on "Roy of the Rovers") but relished the chance to come up with a story more in line with Action's street level, working class approach. He was paired with artist Barrie Mitchell, who had drawn the outgoing "Play Till You Drop!". He designed Lefty Lampton as a cross between a young Denis Law and George Best. Tully meanwhile added often-irreverent humour to the strip in Lefty's private life, including tough girlfriend Angie and his drunken wheeler-dealer grandfather.

== Publishing history ==
Mitchell emigrated to Spain in June 1976 after a month on the strip, and was replaced by Tony Harding, who would censor some of Tully's scripts - refusing, for instance, to render fans flicking V signs at Lefty. Action had immediately come under attack from the tabloid media for its violence and nihilistic tone, but "Look Out for Lefty!" initially seemed to avoid the furore until the 23 September 1977 edition, where Angie's action of throwing a bottle at a player victimising Lefty was taken as proof the comic was encouraging hooliganism, with the noted referee Jack Taylor speaking out in the Daily Mail to criticise it as a bad example for children. The development was reportedly introduced by Tully in response to editor John Smith's concerns the strip was growing stale. That the same issue featured a controversial cover for "Kids Rule O.K." only added fuel to the fire, and after editorial director John Sanders was criticised by Frank Bough in an interview on the BBC's Nationwide TV programme the IPC board opted to withdraw the comic for an overhaul.

Beyond avoiding future depictions of hooliganism, in theory "Look Out for Lefty!" faced less work to be retooled to be acceptable. However, in Action - The Story of a Violent Comic, author Martin Barker noted a pattern of minor changes when the strip returned in the 4 December 1976 edition under the editorship of Sid Bicknell, now occupying the colour pages at the expense of "Hook Jaw". Angie's close crop became subtly more feminine, and she stopped getting involved in physical altercations. Lefty's streak for humiliating and mildly injuring players who targeted him was also toned down, both characters stopped dropping letters when speaking and much of the dark comedy was taken out of the actions of Lefty's grandfather. The strip would continue until Action folded in November 1977 when the title was merged with Battle Picture Weekly, not being suitable for continuing in the war comic.

The pre-ban episodes of "Look Out for Lefty" and some surviving unpublished pages appeared in Action - Story of a Violent Comic, with added narration from Barker. Since 2016 the rights to "Look Out for Lefty!" have been owned by Rebellion Developments.

== Plot summary ==
Living in his grandfather Enoch's second-hand store, Kenny 'Lefty' Lampton dreams of becoming a footballer with First Division Birmingham City. At school, P.E. teacher Mr. Gosling invites Sam Henderson, a scout for Burmington City to watch posh lickspittle Sid Smythe play for the school team, but he is more impressed with Lampton, and offers both a trial. Despite the scout being impressed by the boy's left foot, due to his absent-minded grandfather leaving his dentures in Lefty's boot the trial goes badly, though the kindly Henderson suggests he try at the town's Third Division also-ran side Wigford Rovers. He also soon becomes close to fellow pupil and violently devoted Bay City Rollers fan Angie Roberts, whose father Mike agrees to give him a run-out for Wigford's youth team, where he is coach. Despite some brutal attention from opposing players he has crossed around town he scores five goals in the match, though at school he continues to be singled out by Gosling and Smythe. He continued to impress for Wigford, scoring four goals in the youth cup final despite an injured ankle, further infuriating Gosling and getting help from Angie, and is offered an apprenticeship by Wigford.

With the school term nearly over Gosling attempts to injure Lefty during a teachers versus pupils 'friendly' but ends up humiliating himself, while Lefty tries to look after his increasingly erratic grandfather after he falls off a ladder. Nevertheless, he soon earns a spot on the Wigford reserve team, but is called away at half time during his debut when his grandfather escapes from hospital. Manager Jim Bowker gives him another chance, but Lefty makes an enemy of Ray Jarvis, who arranges for his brother Terry - also in the reserves - to get even on his behalf. Terry continually makes Lefty look bad until the watching Angie beans him with a coke bottle, and without Jarvis as a spoiler he scores twice and sets up another goal in the last 15 minutes. He gains further revenge by semi-accidentally injuring Ray and is called up to the first team to play bitter rivals Rotherfield. An incident before the game makes him a target for the team's thug ultras the Rippers, and they pelt him with missiles until Lefty tricks them into being arrested by the police, allowing Lefty to score a hat-trick.

Lefty became an integral part of the Wigford side, and his goals fired them to promotion to the Second Division, where he continued to star - even earning a call-up to the England youth team.

== Collected editions ==
Title	ISBN	Publisher	Release date	Contents
Action - The Story of a Violent Comic	9781852860233	Titan Books	11 August 1990	Material from Action 14 February to 16 October 1976

== Reception ==
Moose Harris opined "In its original form, Lefty had the distinction of being a truly original football strip, with some realistic and sympathetic characters. Its transformation into another Tiger-styled Roy of the Rovers wannabe is rather sad."
