= Hellman of Hammer Force =

British comic book story

- Major Kurt Hellman on the cover of the 7 August 1976 edition of Action.

Publication information
- Publisher: IPC Magazines
- Schedule: Weekly
- Title(s): Action; 14 February 1976 to 12 November 1977 (Note: No issues of Action were published between 16 October and 4 December 1976); Action Annual; 1977-1980; Battle; 19 November 1977 to 8 July 1978
- Formats: Original material for the series has been published as a strip in the comics anthology(s) Action; Battle.
- Publication date: 14 February 1976 – 8 July 1978
- Main character(s): Major Kurt Hammer 'Big' Max; Dekker

Creative team
- Writer(s): Gerry Finley-Day
- Artist(s): Mike Dorey; Alex Henderson; Mike White; Jim Watson

"Hellman of Hammer Force" is a British comic strip published by IPC Magazines in the boys' comic anthology titles Action and later Battle between 14 February 1976 and 8 July 1978. The story was set in World War II; while war comics were common material in British comics of the time, "Hellman of Hammer Force" was rare for its use of a sympathetic Wehrmacht officer as the lead protagonist. While not as controversial as fellow Action stories such as "Kids Rule O.K." and "Hookjaw" it was nevertheless caught up in the campaign against the title by the British tabloid press.

== Creation ==
When Pat Mills and Geoff Kemp were left with three months to create eight stories for the new weekly Action comic the pair quickly decided on a template of taking familiar stories and adding a subversive twist to them. World War II comics had been a staple of British comics since the 1950s and a variety of approaches had been used for stories told at many ranks in many branches of the Allied services on land, sea and air. While Mills and John Wagner had added some grit and realism to the genre while creating the successful Battle for IPC in 1975, the stories had again focused on Allied protagonists; for Action's sole war story Mills and Kemp decided to invert this and follow an honourable German officer during the conflict. Mills recalled that IPC managing editor John Sanders was initially against the idea and took some persuading, and cited the work of novelist Sven Hassel as an inspiration. Gerry Finley-Day was also influenced by Colonel Martin Hessler, the character played by Robert Shaw in Battle of the Bulge. Despite the unconventional nature of the lead, the comic was not above using jingoistic language when referring to Hellman.

== Publishing history ==
Action launched on 8 February 1976 (Note: British comics of the time carried their off-sale date on the covers), and was heavily advertised. It immediately caused a sensation, both in terms of sales and gathering negative attention from Britain's tabloid press. At the time of publishing, several conservative pressure groups were screening the media for its perceived negative influence on British youth, particularly the influential curtain-twitcher Mary Whitehouse, head of the National Viewers and Listeners Association. While "Hellman of Hammer Force" itself was relatively unscathed - with most of the criticism aimed at the gore of "Hookjaw" and "Death Game 1999", the anti-authoritarian "Kids Rule O.K." and the use of off-pitch violence in the football strip "Look Out for Lefty" it was nevertheless withdrawn along with the rest of the magazine after 16 October 1978 when press outcry reached fever pitch, leading to talk of newsagents boycotting IPC's entire output in protest. Despite this, the strip did draw some bemused responses from young readers at a time when many had living grandparents who had fought against Germany in the war.

IPC removed editor John Smith in favour of the long-serving Sid Bicknell, who was given the brief of making Action less controversial. Again, "Hellman of Hammer Force" largely escaped censure, though pages of some planned episodes were redrawn, including eliminating a cameo by Joseph Stalin. Action returned to publication on 28 November 1976, but the retooled version was poorly received and rapidly lost readers. A year later the comic was merged into Battle, with "Hellman of Hammer Force"'s status as a war story meant it was a natural fit for continuation; it would continue in the renamed Battle Action until July 1978. The strip would occasionally be renamed for some arcs, but would generally revert to the original title. The first arc in Battle, "The Early Adventures of Hellman of Hammer Force" was - as the name suggested - a prequel, recounting the character's escapes before the start of the Action stories.

Some strips were reprinted in the 1981 Action Annual and the short-lived 1987 All-Action Monthly. In 2016, the strip - along with the rest of Action - was among the properties purchased from Egmont Publishing by Rebellion Developments. The publisher released a collection of the Action strips in 2021, under their Treasury of British Comics label. In 2022, "Hellman of Hammer Force" was one of the classic properties reactivated for Rebellion's new Battle Action Special. The new strip was written by Garth Ennis, with Mike Dorey returning to art duties, and was successful enough that a five-issue mini-series was released in 2023, with another new "Hellman of Hammer Force" story in the fifth issue. Another story appeared in 2025.

== Plot summary ==
Major Kurt Hellman is the commander of Hammer Force, an armoured division spearheading the Blitzkrieg into Belgium on 1 May 1940. While an efficient and professional fighter, Hellman respects his enemies as fellow soldiers and does not kill them indiscriminately. His loyalty is to Germany and his men, and Hellman dislikes the Nazi Party and the sadistic elements of the regime, such as the SS. Much to Hellman's displeasure, the unit receives an SS adjutant in the shape of fervent Nazi Gauleiter Kastner. He is soon revealed to be a cowardly martinet with little care for the lives of German soldiers and frequently voices his displeasure about Hellman's reluctance to engage in slaughter, his habit of taking prisoners and his refusal to leave men behind. While Hammer Force are the first unit to reach the English Channel, the conflict between Hellman and Kastner comes to a head when the Major refuses to abandon an injured British soldier to the sea. Kastner orders them both shot but is hit moments later when the group is strafed by a passing Spitfire.

Hellman is awarded the Iron Cross for his success, and after a brief stints in Greece and Crete is transferred to North Africa. He is delighted to find the reconstituted Hammer Force has been re-equipped with fearsome Tiger I tanks, but less pleased to find a recovered Kastner is again assigned as SS liaison. Despite Hellman's brilliance a war of attrition sets in after the Battle of El Alamein, and - after America enters the conflict, and Kastner makes a cowardly escape via plane - is forced to destroy his final remaining Tigers before withdrawing, while his loyal batman Muller suffered permanent leg injuries.

Hammer Force is next assigned to the Eastern Front. Despite being equipped with new Panther tanks, Hellman soon finds that the Russian T-34 is an enemy to be wary of and that the Red Army gives no quarter. Hammer Force is ordered to work alongside an SS armoured unit who use the huge but unwieldy Elefant tank destroyers, and Hellman soon falls out with their cruel commander Gruber. Gruber makes several attempts to take out Hellman before forcing Hammer Force to cross a minefield, destroying its tanks and killing most of Hellman's men. Furious, he makes the SS unit make a stand against the Russians where they are all killed, with Hammer finishing Gruber himself. The SS are highly suspicious of Hammer, and as a result he is given a suicide mission - holding the town of Ozel against the advancing Russians with only a handful of tanks and a force made up of condemned deserters and criminals. Despite the men making several attempts to kill him, Hellman is able to fend off the Red Army for several days before escaping in a Tiger with a trip of the deserters 'Big' Max, Dekker and Brenner. Thanks to Hellman the group are able to make their way back to German lines.

The unit is again reconstituted and ordered to Italy, with Max and Dekker now serving as Hellman's staff. The major soon makes another enemy in the SS by striking General Von Starm. The latter issues a warrant for Hellman's arrest but he is already in Salerno, where Hammer Force's success leads to the Feldmarschall belaying the arrest. A second battle follows at Anzio, where Hellman has to use a scant force to face an amphibious landing by Commandos and Sherman tanks. Under his command they thwart the attack, forcing the Allies to redirect their efforts to Monte Cassino, and Hellman is again in the thick of the action. Despite a staunch defence, after five months' fighting the Germans are forced back. Von Starm attempted to draw Hellman into a trap afterwards, but was himself killed.

With the Italian front collapsing, Hammer Force are moved to Normandy in June 1944. Hellman is convinced it will be invaded by the Allies soon, but top brass believes otherwise and has the best units stationed elsewhere. He finds his new men are similarly complacent, despite the threat posed by the growing boldness of the French Resistance. He begins whipping the unit into shape before the Allies suddenly invade on 6 June. Hammer Force is soon overwhelmed, and the Tigers are no match for the new American Pershing tanks. Hellman however has the chance to help two generals fleeing the repercussions of the 20 July plot from Gestapo agent Fleischer to flee to neutral Switzerland. The Allied advance soon forces the Wehrmacht back to the Rhine, despite briefly stalling at Arnheim and continued local successes for Hellman and his men. Hammer Force are at the vanguard of the Ardennes Offensive as Germany makes one last desperate attack in December 1944 but the assault stalled; Hellman and his surviving men had to evade Allied forces after getting cut off in Brussels. By the time they return, the Red Army is moving towards Berlin, with Kastner once again arriving to cause trouble for Hellman - who is put in charge of leading a breakout with a unit of a hundred callow boys. Realising his charges are cannon fodder, Hellman arranges for them to be ferried to Sweden rather than killed in a futile fashion. He returns to do his duty in the doomed defence of Germany with Max and Dekker.

Earlier in the war, Hellman had also fought with distinction in Poland and France and taken part in Operation Barbarossa. Kastner was eventually killed by Hellman in the Battle of Berlin, shortly before Hellman, Max and Dekker were captured by the Red Army.

== Collected editions ==
A limited edition hardback version of each volume was available exclusively from the 2000 AD and Treasury of British Comics websites. The first volume didn't have an ISBN for the hardback edition.

Title	ISBN (paperback)	ISBN (hardback)	Publisher	Release date	Contents
Hellman of Hammer Force	9781781089422	—	Rebellion Developments	8 December 2021	Material from Action 14 February to 18 December 1976.
Hellman of Hammer Force: Downfall	9781837860982	9781837862542	Rebellion Developments	27 March 2024	Material from Battle 19th November 1977 to 8 July 1978.

== Reception ==
"Hellman of the Hammer Force" has attracted positive reviews, though Moose Harris considered the quality of the artwork declined after Mike Dorey left the strip. Frank Plowright echoed this view, but felt that the strong script meant the comic "stands up without the need for nostalgia". Despite being considered less controversial than other strips in Action, analysis of "Hellman of Hammer Force" by Andrew Screen for Horrified Magazine found that it was the most violent across the comic's whole run, containing 438 deaths.

Comics writer Garth Ennis is an avowed fan of "Hellman of Hammer Force", particularly the final arc in Action for having "a real sense of the Third Reich in its death-throes". Mike Dorey would look back on the strip as one of his favourites from his own work.
