= Ron Turner (illustrator) =

British comics illustrator and creator

- Born: 3 August 1922 Norwich, England
- Died: 19 December 1998 (aged 76)
- Areas: Cartoonist, Writer, Artist, Letterer
- Notable works: Comic strips: "The Daleks" "Thunderbirds"

Ronald Turner (3 August 1922 – 19 December 1998) was a British illustrator and comic book artist.

== Early life and career ==
Turner was born in Norwich, England. He became interested in science fiction at an early age, with numerous works across several media: the novels of H. G. Wells, Edgar Rice Burroughs, and Jules Verne; films and film serials such as Metropolis, Things to Come, and Flash Gordon; and Alex Raymond's comic strips. He developed a keen interest in American science-fiction pulp magazines, such as Amazing Stories and Astounding Stories (now known as Analog Science Fiction), and first started to develop his talent by attempting to copy the often spectacular cover illustrations.

In 1936, at the age of 14, Turner first got work as an apprentice in Odhams, a London art studio and publishing house. By 1938, Turner was providing illustrations for the British magazine Modern Wonder. In 1940, Turner's professional art career was interrupted by the Second World War, and he was drafted into the British Army. He returned to professional illustration in the late 1940s, finding a job drawing comic strips for Scion's Big series, which were mostly centred around the crew of the Atomic Mole: a subterranean craft, that explored the theoretical "habitable spaces" beneath the Earth's crust.

Odhams eventually began publishing a line of paperback fiction, for which Turner drew numerous covers, notably the Vargo Statten series by John Russell Fearn. Turner's art raised his profile to the extent that other publishers started to send him assignments. In 1953, Turner left Odhams to try his hand at freelancing and attempt to produce a regular comic strip in the style of British cartoonist Frank Hampson, whose work he admired.

== Solo comics work ==
In 1953, Turner spoke to the publisher of Tit-Bits Science Fiction Novels (for which he was providing cover illustration) about the possibility of producing his own comic series. The publisher agreed, and began Tit-Bits Science Fiction Comics, a 64-page monthly comic book written, drawn and lettered by Turner. It quickly became apparent that the workload was too onerous for one man, and Turner brought in other artists in order to meet his deadlines. Publication was discontinued after seven issues.

Around the time of the demise of Tit-Bits Comics, Turner began to write, draw and letter the "Space Ace" strip for the Lone Star comic, which required only four pages per month. In 1954, he also started drawing for Amalgamated Press's Super-Detective Library comic, which had recently started running a science-fiction strip titled "Rick Random: Space Detective". Editor Ted Holmes commissioned Turner to provide art for the strip, leaving the chores of script-writing, lettering and cover illustration to others. Turner worked on "Rick Random" for the next five years.

== 1960s ==
As the vogue for pulp science fiction dwindled, Turner found work doing cover illustrations again for numerous publications, such as the popular science journal Practical Mechanics. By the mid-1960s, Turner had mostly abandoned the world of monthly publishing, and was producing original paint-by-number paintings for the company Craftmaster.

In 1965, Turner was offered the opportunity to draw his first colour comic strip, based on the Gerry Anderson TV series Stingray, for TV Century 21 Stingray Extra (a holiday special issue of the weekly comic TV Century 21). The following year, Turner began contributing to TV Century 21 on a regular basis with his first continuing colour comic strip, "The Daleks", featuring the mechanical villains from the TV series Doctor Who. Turner replaced the strip's previous artist Richard Jennings, initially for issues 50 and 51 (January 1966) and then on a regular basis from issue 59 (March 1966). He continued to illustrate The Daleks until its conclusion in issue 104 (January 1967).

Between 1965 and 1969, Turner also contributed strips based on the various Anderson series to a number of TV Century 21 holiday specials and the publisher's hardback annual books, illustrating further Stingray strips in addition to ones based on Fireball XL5, Thunderbirds, Captain Scarlet and the Mysterons and Joe 90. He illustrated all 80 pages of the Joe 90 Puzzle Book and the same number for the Joe 90 Dot to Dot Book (both Century 21 Publishing, 1968) as well as providing strips based on the series The Champions, Star Trek and Land of the Giants for the Joe 90 Top Secret Annual (1969). In addition, he again found work with Amalgamated Press (now called Fleetway), taking over the black-and-white "Robot Builders" strip from Carlos Cruz for Fleetway's Tiger and Hurricane comic magazine.

== 1970s ==
In the 1970s, Turner began working for IPC Media (which had absorbed Fleetway), drawing strips for the Whizzer and Chips comic, such as "Wonder-car", "Archie's Angels" and "Danny Drew's Dialling Man", which were generally aimed at the young adult market. As well as contributing a regular Star Trek strip to IPC Media's TV21, he also continued his association with Gerry Anderson with Thunderbirds strips for the 1972 Thunderbirds Annual and the 1973 Countdown Annual.

In the late 1970s, Turner drew a number of "Judge Dredd" comic strips for 2000 A.D., including several episodes in the first multi-part story The Robot Wars although his style did not gain the favour of his editors, and the long-term assignment eventually fell to other artists. Instead, Turner found regular work on the re-launched version of IPC's formerly violent comic Action with "The Spinball Slaves"—a sequel to the science-fiction sport strip "Death Game 1999" (influenced by the 1975 film Rollerball) and its less violent sequel "Spinball". When Action merged with IPC's war comic Battle Picture Weekly to become Battle Action, Turner contributed a further "Spinball" sequel strip entitled "The Spinball Wars". He also worked on a revival of "Rick Random" also for 2000 A.D..

== 1980s ==
Turner continued to work for Battle Action under its new title Battle Action Force, drawing many of the "Action Force" strips, which featured Action Man characters licensed from Mattel. He also began drawing a strip called "Journey to the Stars" for the new IPC Media weekly comic Speed, although publication ceased shortly afterwards. Turner found work with other IPC comics such as War and Battle Picture Library, but the shrinking comics market in 1980s Britain soon caused these publications to fold in 1984. At this time, Turner announced his retirement, although not long afterwards he was found drawing strips for an independent small press, including "Nick Hazard" and "Kalgan the Golden".

== 1990s and death ==
By this point, Turner had started regularly providing book cover illustrations once again, on this occasion for Gryphon Books. He also painted a new six-part "Daleks" strip for Doctor Who Magazine.

Turner died of a stroke and a heart attack in 1998. His artwork has continued to appear posthumously on books published by Gryphon Books and Wildside Press, drawing on many previously unpublished pieces as well as re-printing his earlier book cover illustrations.

== Bibliography ==
=== Books ===
The following books are entirely or substantially illustrated by Turner:

- Into Space with Ace Brave! Space-Master (Birn Brothers Ltd., 1953) (pop-up book)
- Joe 90 Puzzle Book (Century 21 Publishing, 1968) (written, devised and illustrated by Turner)
- Joe 90 Dot to Dot Book (Century 21 Publishing, 1968) (written, devised and illustrated by Turner)
- Rick Random: Space Detective (656 pages, Prion Books, 2008, ISBN 1-85375-673-3) (all bar one story illustrated by Turner)

=== Comic strips ===
Comics work includes:

- The Amstor Computer
  - "854391 – A Modern Christmas..." (wr: Roy Preston, in Eagle #92, 1983)
- Captain Scarlet and the Mysterons
  - "Assassination of the Director of Economic Affairs" (in Captain Scarlet Annual, September 1967)
  - Untitled Story (in TV Century 21 Annual, September 1968)
  - "Target London" (in Captain Scarlet Annual, September 1968)
  - "Destroy San Francisco" (in TV21 Annual, September 1969)
  - "Lost in Time" (in TV21 Annual, September 1969)
- The Champions
  - "Error of Judgement" (in Joe 90 Top Secret Annual, September 1969)
- The Daleks
  - "The Eve of the War", parts 4 and 5 (wr: David Whitaker, in TV Century 21 #50–51, January 1966)
  - "The Rogue Planet" (wr: David Whitaker, in TV Century 21 #59–62, March 1966)
  - "Impasse" (wr: David Whitaker, in TV Century 21 #63–69, April–May 1966)
  - "The Terrorkon Harvest" (wr: David Whitaker, in TV Century 21 #70–75, May–June 1966)
  - "Legacy of Yesteryear" (wr: David Whitaker, in TV Century 21 #76–85, July–September 1966)
  - "Shadow of Humanity" (wr: David Whitaker, in TV Century 21 #86–89, September 1966)
  - "The Emissaries of Jevo" (wr: David Whitaker, in TV Century 21 #90–95, October–November 1966)
  - "Road to Conflict" (wr: David Whitaker, in TV Century 21 #96–104, November 1966 – January 1967)
  - "Return of the Elders" (wr: John Lawrence, in Doctor Who Magazine #249–254, February–July 1997)
- Fireball XL5
  - "The Drifting Coffin" (in Fireball XL5 Annual, September 1966)
- Joe 90
  - "Deadly Toy" (in Joe 90 Annual, September 1968)
  - "Rat Trap" (in Joe 90 Annual, September 1968)
  - "Ambush" (in Joe 90 Annual, September 1968)
  - "Doctor Fawkes" (in Joe 90 Annual, September 1968)
  - "Check Mate" (in Joe 90 Annual, September 1968)
  - "Break-Down" (in Joe 90 Annual, September 1969)
  - "The Deadly Swarm" (in Joe 90 Annual, September 1969)
- Judge Dredd
  - "Robots" (wr: John Wagner, in 2000 A.D. #9, April 1977)
  - "Robot Wars", parts 2, 4 and 7 (wr: John Wagner, in 2000 A.D. #11, 13 and 16, May–June 1977)
  - "The Solar Sniper" (wr: Gerry Finley-Day, in 2000 A.D. #21, July 1977)
- Land of the Giants
  - Untitled Story (in Joe 90 Top Secret Annual, September 1969)
- Rick Random
  - "Kidnappers from Space" (in Super-Detective Library #44, December 1954)
  - "The Case of the Man Who Owned the Moon" (in Super-Detective Library #49, March 1955)
  - "The Five Lives of Mr. Quex" (in Super-Detective Library #64, September 1955)
  - "The Gold Rush Planet" (in Super-Detective Library #66, October 1955)
  - "The Mystery of the Moving Planet" (in Super-Detective Library #70, December 1955)
  - "The Planet of Lost Men" (in Super-Detective Library #79, June 1956)
  - "Invaders from the Ocean Planet" (in Super-Detective Library #83, July 1956)
  - "Manhunt Through Space" (in Super-Detective Library #90, October 1956)
  - "The Mystery of the Time Travellers" (in Super-Detective Library #97, February 1957)
  - "The Riddle of the Vanishing People" (in Super-Detective Library #101, April 1957)
  - "Sabotage from Space" (in Super-Detective Library #111, September 1957)
  - "The S.O.S. from Space" (wr: Harry Harrison, in Super-Detective Library #115, November 1957)
  - "The Planet of Terror" (wr: Bob Kesten, in Super-Detective Library #123, March 1958)
  - "The Space Pirates" (wr: Harry Harrison, in Super-Detective Library #127, May 1958)
  - "Perilous Mission" (wr: Harry Harrison, in Super-Detective Library #129, June 1958)
  - "The Mystery of the Frozen World" (wr: Bob Kesten, Super-Detective Library #133, August 1958)
  - "The Mystery of the Robot World" (wr: Conrad Frost and Barry Coker, in Super-Detective Library #137, October 1958)
  - "The Terror from Space" (wr: Harry Harrison, in Super-Detective Library #143, January 1959)
  - "The Threat from Space" (wr: Bob Kesten, in Super-Detective Library #153, June 1959)
  - "The Kidnapped Planet" (wr: Bob Kesten, in Super-Detective Library #163, December 1959)
  - "The Riddle of the Astral Assassin!" (wr: Steve Moore, in 2000 A.D. and Star Lord #113–117, May–June 1979)
- Star Trek
  - Untitled Story (in Joe 90 Top Secret Annual, September 1969)
  - Untitled Story (in TV21 #58–61, October 1970)
- 'Stingray'
  - "Double Trap" (in TV Century 21 Stingray Extra, May 1965)
  - Untitled Story (in TV Century 21 International Extra, October 1965)
  - "The Collector" (in Stingray Annual, September 1966)
  - "The Sunken City" (in Stingray Annual, September 1966)
  - "Death Ray" (in Stingray Annual, September 1966)
- Tharg's Future Shocks
  - "Just Like Home" (wr: Peter Harris, in 2000 A.D. #29, September 1977)
  - "Beautiful World" (in 2000 A.D. #30, September 1977)
- 'Thunderbirds'
  - Untitled Story (in Thunderbirds Extra, March 1966)
  - "The Hood Makes a Strike" (in Thunderbirds Annual, September 1966)
  - Untitled Story (in Thunderbirds TV Century 21 Spring Extra, March 1967)
  - "Volcano Alert" (in TV Century 21 Annual, September 1967)
  - "Bridge of Fear" (in Thunderbirds Annual, September 1967)
  - "Day Return from Death" (in Thunderbirds Annual, September 1968)
  - "Curse of the Elastos" (in Thunderbirds Annual, September 1968)
  - "Fire Lords" (in Captain Scarlet and Thunderbirds Annual, September 1969)
  - "Crash Down" (in Captain Scarlet and Thunderbirds Annual, September 1969)
  - "Invisible Invader" (in Thunderbirds Annual 1972, September 1971)
  - "The Law Breakers" (in Thunderbirds Annual 1972, September 1971)
  - "The Collector" (in Countdown Annual 1973, September 1972)
- Zero-X
  - "Conflict on Mars" (in TV Century 21 Annual, September 1967)
  - "Brink of Disaster" (in TV Century 21 Annual, September 1968)
  - "Break Out" (in TV21 Annual, September 1969)

=== Cover art (books) ===
The following books all feature cover illustrations by Turner:

- Operation Venus by John Russell Fearn (Scion, 1950)
- Annihilation! by Vargo Statten (John Russell Fearn) (Scion, 1950)
- The Micro Men by Vargo Statten (John Russell Fearn) (Scion, 1950)
- Wanderer of Space by Vargo Statten (John Russell Fearn) (Scion, 1950)
- 2,000 Years On! by Vargo Statten (John Russell Fearn) (Scion, 1950)
- Inferno! by Vargo Statten (John Russell Fearn) (Scion, 1950)
- The Cosmic Flame by Vargo Statten (John Russell Fearn) (Scion, 1950)
- Nebula X by Vargo Statten (John Russell Fearn) (Scion, 1950)
- The Sun Makers by Vargo Statten (John Russell Fearn) (Scion, 1950)
- The Avenging Martian by Vargo Statten (John Russell Fearn) (Scion, 1951)
- Deadline to Pluto by Vargo Statten (John Russell Fearn) (Scion, 1951)
- The Petrified Planet by Vargo Statten (John Russell Fearn) (Scion, 1951)
- The Devouring Fire by Vargo Statten (John Russell Fearn) (Scion, 1951)
- The Renegade Star by Vargo Statten (John Russell Fearn) (Scion, 1951)
- The New Satellite by Vargo Statten (John Russell Fearn) (Scion, 1951)
- The Catalyst by Vargo Statten (John Russell Fearn) (Scion, 1951)
- Anjani the Mighty by Earl Titan (John Russell Fearn) (Scion, 1951)
- The Gold of Akada by Earl Titan (John Russell Fearn) (Scion, 1951)
- The Caves of Death by Victor Norwood (Scion, 1951)
- The Skull of Kanaima by Victor Norwood (Scion, 1951)
- The Temple of the Dead by Victor Norwood (Scion, 1951)
- Spawn of Space by Franz Harkon (Scion, 1951)
- Destination Mars by George Sheldon Brown (Dennis Hughes) (Edwin Self, 1951)
- The Inner Cosmos by Vargo Statten (John Russell Fearn) (Scion, 1952)
- The Space Warp by Vargo Statten (John Russell Fearn) (Scion, 1952)
- The Eclipse Express by Vargo Statten (John Russell Fearn) (Scion, 1952)
- The Time Bridge by Vargo Statten (John Russell Fearn) (Scion, 1952)
- The Man from Tomorrow by Vargo Statten (John Russell Fearn) (Scion, 1952)
- The G-Bomb by Vargo Statten (John Russell Fearn) (Scion, 1952)
- Laughter in Space by Vargo Statten (John Russell Fearn) (Scion, 1952)
- Tremor by Frank Lederman (Kaye Publications, 1952)
- Two Days of Terror by Roy Sheldon (H.J. Campbell) (Panther, 1952)
- Ultra Spectrum by Vargo Statten (John Russell Fearn) (Scion, 1953)
- Zero Hour by Vargo Statten (John Russell Fearn) (Scion, 1953)
- The Black Avengers by Vargo Statten (John Russell Fearn) (Scion, 1953)
- Odyssey of Nine by Vargo Statten (John Russell Fearn) (Scion, 1953)
- Pioneer, 1990 by Vargo Statten (John Russell Fearn) (Scion, 1953)
- Man of Two Worlds by Vargo Statten (John Russell Fearn) (Scion, 1953)
- The Lie Destroyer by Vargo Statten (John Russell Fearn) (Scion, 1953)
- Black Bargain by Vargo Statten (John Russell Fearn) (Scion, 1953)
- Moons for Sale by Volsted Gridban (John Russell Fearn) (Scion, 1953)
- The Dyno-Depressant by Volsted Gridban (John Russell Fearn) (Scion, 1953)
- Magnetic Brain by Volsted Gridban (John Russell Fearn) (Scion, 1953)
- Scourge of the Atom by Volsted Gridban (John Russell Fearn) (Scion, 1953)
- Exit Life by Volsted Gridban (John Russell Fearn) (Scion, 1953)
- The Master Must Die by Volsted Gridban (John Russell Fearn) (Scion, 1953)
- Conquerors of Venus by Edgar Rees Kennedy (John W. Jennison) (Edwin Self, 1953)
- Cosmic Exodus by Conrad G. Holt (John Russell Fearn) (Tit-Bits Science-Fiction Library, 1953)
- The Hell Fruit by Lawrence F. Rose (John Russell Fearn) (Tit-Bits Science-Fiction Library, 1953)
- Doomed Nation of the Skies by Steve Future (Steve Gilroy) (Tit-Bits Science-Fiction Library, 1953)
- The Star Seekers by Francis G. Rayer (Tit-Bits Science-Fiction Library, 1953)
- Sinister Forces by Alvin Westwood (Brown Watson Ltd.,1953)
- Planetoid Disposals Ltd. by Volsted Gridban (E.C. Tubb) (Milestone, 1953)
- Fugitive of Time by Volsted Gridban (E.C. Tubb) (Milestone, 1953)
- The Wall by Charles Grey (E.C. Tubb) (Milestone, 1953)
- Dynasty of Doom by Charles Grey (E.C. Tubb) (Milestone, 1953)
- Tormented City by Charles Grey (E.C. Tubb) (Milestone, 1953)
- Space Hunger by Charles Grey (E.C. Tubb) (Milestone, 1953)
- I Fight for Mars by Charles Grey (E.C. Tubb) (Milestone, 1953)
- The Great Ones by Jon J. Deegan (Robert Sharp) (Panther, 1953)
- Vanguard to Neptune by J.M. Walsh (Cherry Tree Fantasy Books, 1953)
- Zhorani (Master of the Universe) by Karl Maras (H.K. Bulmer) (Comyns, 1953)
- The Grand Illusion by Vargo Statten (John Russell Fearn) (Scion, 1954)
- Wealth of the Void by Vargo Statten (John Russell Fearn) (Scion, 1954)
- A Time Appointed by Vargo Statten (John Russell Fearn) (Scion, 1954)
- I Spy by Vargo Statten (John Russell Fearn) (Scion, 1954)
- 1,000 Year Voyage by Vargo Statten (John Russell Fearn) (Scion, 1954)
- The Purple Wizard by Volsted Gridban (John Russell Fearn) (Scion, 1954)
- Frozen Limit by Volsted Gridban (John Russell Fearn) (Scion, 1954)
- I Came – I Saw – I Wondered by Volsted Gridban (John Russell Fearn) (Scion, 1954)
- The Genial Dinosaur by Volsted Gridban (John Russell Fearn) (Scion, 1954)
- The Lonely Astronomer by Volsted Gridban (John Russell Fearn) (Scion, 1954)
- The Plant from Infinity by Karl Maras (Peter Hawkins) (Paladin Press, 1954)
- Alien Life by E.C. Tubb (Paladin Press, 1954)
- The Living World by Carl Maddox (E.C. Tubb) (Scion, 1954)
- The Extra Man by Charles Grey (E.C. Tubb) (Milestone, 1954)
- Menace from the Past by Carl Maddox (E.C. Tubb) (Scion, 1954)
- City of No Return by E.C. Tubb (Scion, 1954)
- Hell Planet by E.C. Tubb (Scion, 1954) [cover art reused from City of No Return (1954)]
- The Resurrected Man by E.C. Tubb (Scion, 1954)
- The Hand of Havoc by Charles Grey (E.C. Tubb) (Merit Books, 1954)
- Enterprise 2115 by Charles Grey (E.C. Tubb) (Merit Books, 1954)
- Before the Beginning by Marx Reisen (Tit-Bits Science-Fiction Library, 1954)
- Home is the Martian by Philip Kent (H.K. Bulmer) (Tit-Bits Science-Fiction Library, 1954)
- Mission to the Stars by Philip Kent (H.K. Bulmer) (Tit-Bits Science-Fiction Library, 1954)
- Slaves of the Spectrum by Philip Kent (H.K. Bulmer) (Tit-Bits Science-Fiction Library, 1954)
- Vassals of Venus by Philip Kent (H.K. Bulmer) (Tit-Bits Science-Fiction Library, 1954)
- The Dissentizens by Bruno G. Condray (Leslie Humphreys) (Tit-Bits Science-Fiction Library, 1954)
- Jupiter Equilateral by John Rackham (John T. Phillifent) (Tit-Bits Science-Fiction Library, 1954)
- The Master Weed by John Rackham (John T. Phillifent) (Tit-Bits Science-Fiction Library, 1954)
- Space Puppet by John Rackham (John T. Phillifent) (Tit-Bits Science-Fiction Library, 1954)
- Slave Traders of the Sky by Steve Future (Steve Gilroy) (Tit-Bits Science-Fiction Library, 1953)
- Voyage into Space by Earl Van Loden (Lisle Willis) (Edwin Self, 1954)
- The Yellow Planet by George Sheldon Brown (John W. Jennison) (Edwin Self, 1954)
- Alien Virus by John Rackham (John T. Phillifent) (Tit-Bits Science-Fiction Library, 1955)
- Dimension of Illion by Irving Heine (Dennis Hughes) (Tit-Bits Science-Fiction Library, 1955)
- Exile from Jupiter by Bruno G. Condray (Leslie Humphreys) (Tit-Bits Science-Fiction Library, 1955)
- Deep Freeze by Jonathan Burke (Panther, 1955)
- One Against Time by Hank Janson (Stephen Frances) (Moring, 1956) [background art only]
- The Unseen Assassin by Hank Janson (Stephen Frances) (Moring, 1956) [background art only]
- A Mirror of Witchcraft by Christina Hole (Pedigree Books, 1957)
- The Satanic Mass by H.T.F. Rhodes (Pedigree Books, 1957)
- Pandora’s Box by E.C. Tubb (Gryphon Books, 1996)
- The Golden Amazon by John Russell Fearn (Gryphon Books, 1996)
- Temple of Death by E.C. Tubb (Gryphon Books, 1996)
- Saturn Patrol by E.C. Tubb (Gryphon Books, 1996)
- Kalgan the Golden by E.C. Tubb (Gryphon Books, 1996)
- Assignment New York by E.C. Tubb (Gryphon Books, 1996)
- Aftermath by John Russell Fearn (Gryphon Books, 1996)
- The Golden Amazon Returns by John Russell Fearn (Gryphon Books, 1996)
- The Golden Amazon's Triumph by John Russell Fearn (Gryphon Books, 1996)
- Get Me Headquarters by Stephen Frances (Gryphon Books, 1996)
- Hell Hath No Fury by Sydney J. Bounds (Gryphon Books, 1996)
- She Wanted a Guy by Norman Lazenby (Gryphon Books, 1996)
- You Take the Rap by John Russell Fearn (Gryphon Books, 1996)
- Fantasy Annual 1, ed. Philip Harbottle and Sean Wallace (Cosmos Books, 1997)
- The Return by E.C. Tubb (Gryphon Books, 1997)
- Murder in Space by E.C. Tubb (Gryphon Books, 1997)
- The Golden Amazon's Diamond Quest by John Russell Fearn (Gryphon Books, 1997)
- Murder Wears a Halo by Howard Browne (Gryphon Books, 1997)
- Kidnapped! by Maurice Hershman (Gryphon Books, 1997)
- Kill and Desire by Stephen Frances (Gryphon Books, 1997)
- Mitzi by Michael Avallone (Gryphon Books, 1997)
- I Fight for Mars by E.C. Tubb (Gryphon Books, 1998)
- Alien Life by E.C. Tubb (Gryphon Books, 1998)
- The Tall Adventurer: The Works of E.C. Tubb by Sean Wallace and Philip Harbottle (Beccon, 1998)
- The Gold of Akada by John Russell Fearn (Gryphon Books, 1998)
- The Amazon Strikes Again by John Russell Fearn (Gryphon Books, 1998)
- The Fortress of Utopia by Jack Williamson (Gryphon Books, 1998)
- Twin of the Amazon by John Russell Fearn (Gryphon Books, 1998)
- Conquest of the Amazon by John Russell Fearn (Gryphon Books, 1998)
- Anjani the Mighty by John Russell Fearn (Gryphon Books, 1998)
- If You Have Tears by Howard Browne (Gryphon Books, 1998)
- The Whispering Gorilla by Don Wilcox (Gryphon Books, 1998)
- Fantasy Annual 2, ed. Philip Harbottle and Sean Wallace (Cosmos Books, 1998)
- Earth Set Free by E.C. Tubb (Gryphon Books, 1999)
- The Wall by E.C. Tubb (Gryphon Books, 1999)
- The Stellar Legion by E.C. Tubb (Gryphon Books, 1999)
- The Ruler of Fate & Xandulu by Jack Williamson (Gryphon Books, 1999)
- The Slitherers by John Russell Fearn (Gryphon Books, 1999)
- The Iron God / Tomorrow by Jack Williamson / E.C. Tubb (Gryphon Books, 1999)
- Lord of Atlantis by John Russell Fearn (Gryphon Books, 1999)
- Triangle of Power by John Russell Fearn (Gryphon Books, 1999)
- The Stone from the Green Star by Jack Williamson (Gryphon Books, 1999)
- Gryphon SF and Fantasy Reader 1, ed. Philip Harbottle (Gryphon Books, 1999)
- Fantasy Annual 3, ed. Philip Harbottle and Sean Wallace (Cosmos Books, 1999)
- Death God’s Doom by E.C. Tubb (Cosmos Books, 1999)
- The Sleeping City by E.C. Tubb (Cosmos Books, 1999) [cover art reused from A Mirror of Witchcraft (1957)]
- Manton's World by John Russell Fearn (Cosmos Books, 1999)
- Alien Worlds by E.C. Tubb (Pulp Publishing, 1999)
- The Amythyst City by John Russell Fearn (Gryphon Books, 2000)
- Daughter of the Golden Amazon by John Russell Fearn (Gryphon Books, 2000)
- Blue Spot & Entropy Reversed by Jack Williamson (Gryphon Books, 2000)
- Invader on My Back by Philip E. High (Cosmos Books, 2000)
- These Savage Futurians by Philip E. High (Cosmos Books, 2000)
- The Extra Man by E.C. Tubb (Wildside Press, 2000) [cover art reused from The Plant from Infinity (1954)]
- Fantasy Annual 4, ed. Philip Harbottle and Sean Wallace (Wildside Press, 2000)
- The Central Intelligence by John Russell Fearn (Gryphon Books, 2001)
- Fantasy Quarterly 1, ed. Philip Harbottle (Wildside Press, 2001)
- The Best of John Russell Fearn, Vol. 1 by John Russell Fearn (Wildside Press, 2001)
- The Best of John Russell Fearn, Vol. 2 by John Russell Fearn (Wildside Press, 2001)
- The Cosmic Crusaders by John Russell Fearn (Gryphon Books, 2002)
- Parasite Planet by John Russell Fearn (Gryphon Books, 2002)
- The Genial Dinosaur by John Russell Fearn (Gryphon Books, 2002)
- A Thing of the Past by John Russell Fearn (Gryphon Books, 2002)
- The Space-Born by E.C. Tubb (Wildside Press, 2002) [cover art reused from 1,000 Year Voyage (1954)]
- The Best of Philip E. High by Philip E. High (Wildside Press, 2002)
- Fantasy Adventures 1, ed. Philip Harbottle (Wildside Press, 2002)
- World Out of Step by John Russell Fearn (Gryphon Books, 2003)
- The Shadow People by John Russell Fearn (Gryphon Books, 2003)
- Fantasy Adventures 2, ed. Philip Harbottle (Wildside Press, 2003)
- Fantasy Adventures 3, ed. Philip Harbottle (Wildside Press, 2003)
- Fantasy Adventures 4, ed. Philip Harbottle (Wildside Press, 2003)
- The Best of Sydney J. Bounds by Sydney J. Bounds (Wildside Press, 2003)
- The Best of Sydney J. Bounds, Vol. 2 by Sydney J. Bounds (Wildside Press, 2003)
- Stardeath by E.C. Tubb (Wildside Press, 2003) [cover art reused from Dynasty of Doom (1953)]
- Liquid Death and Other Stories by John Russell Fearn (Wildside Press, 2003)
- Voice of the Conqueror by John Russell Fearn (Wildside Press, 2003)
- The Intelligence Gigantic by John Russell Fearn (Wildside Press, 2003)
- Liners of Time by John Russell Fearn (Wildside Press, 2003)
- The Butterfly Planet by Philip E. High (Wildside Press, 2003)
- Fantasy Annual 5, ed. Philip Harbottle and Sean Wallace (Cosmos Books, 2003)
- Dark Centauri by John Glasby (Gryphon Books, 2004)
- Dwellers in Darkness by John Russell Fearn (Gryphon Books, 2004)
- Kingpin Planet by John Russell Fearn (Gryphon Books, 2004)
- World in Reverse by John Russell Fearn (Gryphon Books, 2004)
- A Step to the Stars by Philip E. High (Cosmos Books, 2004)
- Fantasy Adventures 5, ed. Philip Harbottle (Wildside Press, 2005)
- Fantasy Adventures 6, ed. Philip Harbottle (Wildside Press, 2005)
- Fantasy Adventures 7, ed. Philip Harbottle (Wildside Press, 2005)
- Fantasy Adventures 8, ed. Philip Harbottle (Wildside Press, 2005)
- Fantasy Adventures 11, ed. Philip Harbottle (Wildside Press, 2006)
- Fantasy Adventures 13, ed. Philip Harbottle (Wildside Press, 2008)

=== Cover art (magazines) ===
The following magazines all feature cover illustrations by Turner:

- Tales of Tomorrow, #3, 4 (John Spencer and Co. 1951, 1952)
- Futuristic Science Stories, #7 (John Spencer and Co. 1952)
- Wonders of the Spaceways, #3 (John Spencer and Co. 1952)
- Worlds of Fantasy, #7 (John Spencer and Co. 1952)
- Out of this World, #2 (John Spencer and Co. 1954)
- Vargo Statten Science Fiction Magazine, #1, ed. Vargo Statten (John Russell Fearn) (Scion, 1954)
- Vargo Statten British Science Fiction Magazine, #5, ed. Vargo Statten (John Russell Fearn) (Scion, 1954)
- Planet X-1: The New World (Tit-Bits Science-Fiction Comics, 1954)
- Captain Diamond and the Space Pirates (Tit-Bits Science-Fiction Comics, 1954)
- The Scourge of the Carbon Belt (Tit-Bits Science-Fiction Comics, 1954)
- The Terror of Titan (Tit-Bits Science-Fiction Comics, 1954)
- Practical Mechanics, March 1954 (George Newnes, Ltd, 1954)
- British Science Fiction Magazine, #10–19, ed. Vargo Statten (John Russell Fearn) (Dragon, 1955)
- Supernatural Stories, #6 (Badger, 1955)
- Super Detective Library, #53: The Case of the Space Bubble (Amalgamated Press, 1955)
- Practical Mechanics, September 1955 (George Newnes, Ltd, 1955)
- Practical Mechanics, November 1955 (George Newnes, Ltd, 1955)
- Practical Mechanics, April 1957 (George Newnes, Ltd, 1957)
- Practical Mechanics, December 1957 (George Newnes, Ltd, 1957)
- Practical Mechanics, April 1958 (George Newnes, Ltd, 1958)
- Super Detective Library, #153: Rick Random and the Threat from Space (Amalgamated Press, 1959)
- Practical Mechanics, April–July 1961 (George Newnes, Ltd, 1961)
- Practical Mechanics, September 1961 – August 1962 (George Newnes, Ltd, 1961/62)
- The Dalek Chronicles (Marvel Comics UK, 1994)
