= Massimo Belardinelli =

Italian comics artist (1938–2007)

- Born: 5 June 1938
- Died: 31 March 2007 (aged 68)
- Notable works: Ace Trucking Co.

Massimo Belardinelli (5 June 1938 – 31 March 2007) was an Italian comic artist best known for his work in the British science fiction comic 2000 AD.

== Biography ==
=== Early work ===
Belardinelli was born in Rome. His father was an amateur oil painter. Inspired by the Disney film Fantasia, Belardinelli went into animation in the 1960s, painting backgrounds for films produced by the Sergio Rosi studio. He then moved into comics, again through the Rosi studio, drawing backgrounds for "The Steel Claw" in the British weekly Valiant in a team which also included Giorgio Cambiotti on pencils and Sergio Rosi himself on inks. In 1969 he moved to the Giolitti Studio, which got him work in Italy, Germany, the UK and the USA. He collaborated with Alberto Giolitti on Gold Key Comics' Star Trek series in the US, with Giolitti drawing the characters and Belardinelli the spaceships. In the UK in the mid-1970s he drew "Rat Pack" for Battle Picture Weekly and "Death Game 1999" and "Green's Grudge War" for Action.

=== 2000 AD ===
When 2000 AD was in preparation in 1977, an artist was needed for the revamped "Dan Dare", and Belardinelli tried out for no pay and got the job, and the rare honour of a byline, despite editor Pat Mills' reservations: although he excelled at visualising aliens, alien technology and alien landscapes, Mills thought "the hero looked awful". Belardinelli's work on the strip was not popular, and after a year he was switched to future sports series "Inferno", the sequel to the popular "Harlem Heroes", while former "Harlem Heroes" artist Dave Gibbons took over "Dan Dare".

Belardinelli then drew the second series of "Flesh", in which the time-travelling meat-farmers moved into the prehistoric oceans, in 1978–79. He also drew "The Angry Planet", a sci-fi serial set on colonised Mars, written by Alan Hebden, for Tornado in 1979, and then took over "Blackhawk", Gerry Finley-Day's strip about a Nubian slave who became a Roman centurion, when Tornado merged into 2000 AD later in the year. The strip was given a sci-fi twist by new writers Alan Grant and Kelvin Gosnell, with the hero being abducted by aliens and forced to fight in a galactic arena. Grant believes the strip's popularity was down to Belardinelli's art.

"Meltdown Man", a year-long cliffhanger serial written by Alen Hebden, followed in 1980–81, in which an SAS officer was caught in a nuclear explosion and blasted into a future where humans have enslaved genetically-engineered humanoid animals, and leads the fight for their liberation. In 1981 writers John Wagner and Alan Grant created a new series for him, space haulage comedy "Ace Trucking Co.". Grant says they wanted to exploit Belardinelli's "fevered imagination" and wrote a series which featured "as few actual human beings as possible" - almost all the characters were aliens.

Belardinelli also drew several storylines of the Celtic barbarian strip "Sláine" in 1983–84, whose writer, Pat Mills, selected him to visualise the hero's body-distorting "warp spasm". Although his strips were popular with the general readership, what Mills called "purist comic fans" never really took to him, and his "Sláine" stories were not collected by Titan Books.

=== Later work ===
His last major 2000 AD strips were "The Dead", written by Peter Milligan (1987) - a philosophical yet psychedelic series set in a future where an evolved human race thinks it has conquered death, until demons start erupting from their bodies, and the hero, Fludd, has to travel to the land of the dead to save mankind - violent future sport series "Mean Team" (1985, 1987) and space opera "Moonrunners" (1988–89). He also drew "Joe Alien" for short-lived younger-readers sci-fi comic Wildcat, in 1988. Among his last comic work in the UK was for Fleetway's Teenage Mutant Hero Turtles comic in the early 1990s.

He stopped working in British comics in 1993 when his agent, Alberto Giolitti, died. Having suffered from heart problems, Belardinelli died on 31 March 2007.

== Bibliography ==
Comics work includes:

- "Dan Dare" (in 2000 AD #1-23 (with Ken Armstrong, Pat Mills, Kelvin Gosnell and Steve Moore) and 2000 AD Annual 1978)
- "M.A.C.H. 1" (in 2000 AD #3 & 23-24, 1977)
- "Judge Dredd" (in 2000 AD #8, 1977)
- "Harlem Heroes":
  - "Harlem Heroes" (in 2000 AD #25-27, 1977)
  - "Inferno" (in 2000 AD #36-75, 1977–78)
- "Flesh" (in 2000 AD #86-97, 1978–79)
- "The Angry Planet" (in Tornado #1-22, 1979)
- "Blackhawk" (with Alan Grant/Kelvin Gosnell as "Alvin Gaunt", in 2000 AD #127-161, 1979)
- "Meltdown Man" (in 2000 AD #178-227, 1980–81)
- "Ace Trucking Co." (with co-authors John Wagner/Alan Grant):
  - The Complete Ace Trucking Co. Volume 1 (320 pages ISBN 1-905437-77-3) collects:
    - "The Kleggs" (in 2000 AD #232-236, 1981)
    - "Lugjack" (in 2000 AD #244-250, 1982)
    - "The Great Mush Rush" (in 2000 AD #251-258, 1982)
    - "The Ughbug Bloos" (in 2000 AD #259, 1982)
    - "Last Lug To Abbo Dabbo" (in 2000 AD #260-267, 1982)
    - "Joobaloo" (in 2000 AD #268-272, 1982)
    - "Too Many Bams" (in 2000 AD #273-278, 1982)
    - "The Kloistar Run" (in 2000 AD #279-285, 1982)
    - "Stoop Coop Soup" (in 2000 AD #288-293, 1982)
  - The Complete Ace Trucking Co. Volume 2 (336 pages ISBN 1-905437-98-6) collects:
    - "Bamfeezled" (2000AD Sci-Fi Special 1982)
    - "On The Dangle" (in 2000 AD #378-386, 1984)
    - "Strike!" (in 2000 AD #387-390 and 392-400, 1984–1985)
    - "The Croakside Trip" (in 2000 AD #428-433, 1985)
    - "Stowaway Lugjacker" (in 2000 AD Annual 1986, 1985)
    - "Whatever Happened to Ace Garp?" (in 2000 AD #451, 1986)
    - "The Doppelgarp" (in 2000 AD #452-472, 1986)
    - "The Garpetbaggers" (in 2000 AD #475-483 and 485-498, 1986)
    - "The Homecoming" (in 2000 AD Annual 1989, 1988)
- "Tharg's Time Twisters" (in 2000 AD #297, 306-307, 360, 370, 374, 1983-4)
- "Tharg the Mighty" (in 2000 AD #308-312, 1983)
- "Sláine" (with Pat Mills):
  - Warrior's Dawn (2005, ISBN 1-904265-33-2) collects:
    - "The Beast in the Broch" (in 2000 AD #331-334, 1983)
    - "The Bride of Crom" (in 2000 AD #337-342, 1983)
    - "The Creeping Death" (in 2000 AD #343, 1983)
    - "The Bull Dance" (in 2000 AD #344, 1983)
  - "Dragonheist" (in 2000 AD #361-367, 1984, collected in Time Killer (2007, ISBN 1-905437-21-8)
- "Mean Team"
  - Series One (in 2000 AD #437-447, 1985)
  - Series Two (in 2000 AD #525-531, 533-535 & 537-541, 1987)
- "The Dead" (with Peter Milligan, in 2000 AD #510-519, 1987)
- "Tharg's Future Shocks": "I'm a Believer " (with Neil Gaiman, in 2000 AD #536, 1987)
- "Moonrunners" (in 2000 AD #591-604, 607, 641-644 and three specials, 1988–89)
- "Medivac 318" (in 2000 AD Winter Special #2, 1989)
