= Hook Jaw =

British comic book story

- Hook Jaw on the cover of the 15 May 1976 edition of Action.
- Publisher: IPC Magazines
- Publication date: 14 February 1976 – 12 November 1977
- Title(s): Action; 14 February to 24 April 1976; 15 May to 16 October 1976; 4 December 1976 to 12 November 1977

Creative team
- Writer(s): Pat Mills; Ken Armstrong
- Artist(s): Ramon Sola; Felix Carrion; John Stokes
- Editor(s): Geoff Kemp; John Smith; Sid Bicknell

"Hook Jaw" is a British comic adventure story published in the weekly anthology Action from 14 February to 12 November 1977 by IPC Magazines.

The story is centred around a great white shark with a gaff hook lodged in its lower jaw. Created by Pat Mills and Geoff Kemp, the strip largely happened from Hook Jaw's point of view, portraying the shark as a creature simply following its instincts and forever under attack from amoral humans. Mills would later describe it as an ecological story. "Hook Jaw" was heavily criticised by the British tabloid press for its level of violence.

== Creation ==
Given a short period to create the new action-adventure comic Action in 1976, Pat Mills and Geoff Kemp quickly hit on the idea of taking popular films and television shows and adding their own twist. Their inspiration was Steven Spielberg's blockbuster Jaws; while yet to be released in the UK the film had broken box office records in America and its Christmas release was highly anticipated. The basic idea of doing a shark story was pitched by Ken Armstrong during a brainstorming session with Mills and John Wagner, as he was aware of the impact of "a shark version of Moby Dick". He wanted to emphasise that man was the aggressor in the story;

...Hook Jaw became a ferocious killer because of the brutal way a fisherman tried to capture him by shoving a gaff through his lower jaw. I always worked on the basis that man was plundering Hook Jaw's territory to grab the riches of the ocean and the shark was merely defending its territory.

Mills - who had similar views, later stating "I wanted nature to win!" - worked with Armstrong on the story, and along with IPC editorial director John Sanders encouraged the story to become more gory, with Armstrong recollecting this was to show the reality of shark attacks in detail. Ramon Sola, a Spaniard with a talent for drawing wildlife and described by Mills as "an artistic genius", was assigned to draw the story. He had first worked for IPC on the romance comic Valentine in 1974, and had recently moved to London from Barcelona. Several minor characters in the story were named after Action staff, including Mills, John Wagner and Ian Vosper.

== Publishing history ==
"Hook Jaw" rapidly became a favourite with readers, helped by being placed in the centre colour pages for most of the issues, allowing the blood to pop. It also added to the comic's street cred by covering a violent film some of the audience were not allowed to see; Jaws had been released in the UK on 26 December 1975 to strong box office and considerable publicity due to controversially being rated A (requiring children to be accompanied by an adult).

Right from the start, Action received attention for its high level of violence, with "Hook Jaw"'s frequent dismemberments, maulings and devourings attracting its share of criticism, and after the 16 September 1976 the comic was withdrawn for drastic retooling on the orders of the IPC board. Sola was replaced as artist by Felix Carrion from the start of the second storyline in the 15 May 1976 edition. Despite - or perhaps because of - this the strip was consistently rated the most popular in Action by readers.

Carrion left the strip in the interim; a modified version of his last episode was belatedly published in the 4 December 1976 edition as Action returned to publication, after which British artist John Stokes (primarily known for his work on "Fishboy" for Buster) took over on the strip. Among the steps taken to tone down the returning Action by new editor Sid Bicknell was demoting "Hook Jaw" from the colour pages to lessen the impact of the much-reduced bloodshed. The storyline was also heavily re-edited, with Hook Jaw briskly redirected from the English Channel to more abstract tropical climes, and a marked increase in the competence of the authorities to deal with the shark.

While it remained one of the more popular strips in Action, under the new direction sales slumped and the comic was merged into "Battle"; due to its lack of a military angle it was not selected to continue. Mills later used "Hook Jaw" as a template for the 2000 AD strips "Flesh" and "Shako!". Some episodes of "Hook Jaw" were included in the 1988 224-page softback Big Adventure Book. In 1991 the pre-ban episodes of "Hook Jaw" and a selection of the unedited the unpublished episodes were included in Martin Barker's Action - The Story of a Violent Comic, published by Titan Books. The volume also included analysis of the strip. Spitfire Comics released a collection of the pre-ban strips in Collected Hook Jaw vol.1 in 2007.

=== Titan Comics ===
Since 2016 the rights to "Hook Jaw" have been owned by Rebellion Developments. In 2017, Rebellion licensed the rights to "Hook Jaw" to Titan Comics, who produced a five-part mini-series written by Simon Spurrier and drawn by Conor Boyle. Spurrier was a fan of the original strip, noting "it was disguised as something rather lowbrow... but it concealed some very smart and subversive twists". The Titan series rebooted the story and was set in the present day, with an oceanographer Mag as the sympathetic lead human protagonist. Titan also published a collected edition of the Action strips to tie in with the series. Mills claimed not to have read the new series, but had heard it was "dire".

=== Rebellion Publishing ===
In spring 2020 Rebellion published an Action Special 2020 under its Treasury of British Comics imprint. The special included a new "Hook Jaw" strip by Quint Amity and Dan Lish.

In September of that year, a new version debuted in 2000 AD. With the title now styled as 'Hook-Jaw', it was written by Alec Worley and illustrated by Leigh Gallagher. It re-imagined the shark as an elemental water god capable of changing shape.

== Plot summary ==
In 1972, a group of game fisherman attempt to capture a great white shark in the Caribbean, planning to cut it open and photograph it. However, it kills them, despite a hook getting rammed in its jaw. Learning of the incident, the press nicknames the shark 'Hook Jaw'. A year later it re-emerges during construction of an offshore oil rig in the area. Rig boss Red McNally plans to kill Hook Jaw, rapidly becoming obsessed despite the warnings of the more reasonable lead diver Rick Mason. Blinded by greed and driven insane after a string of disasters hit the rig, McNally eventually dives into the sea to battle Hook Jaw one-on-one and is devoured.

Mason escaped the destruction of the rig and finds himself working for the exploitative Doctor Gelder, who is trying to turn the island of El Salvados in the Gulf of Mexico into a resort called Paradise Island, with little respect for the natives or the marine life. Hook Jaw soon arrives and begins to disrupt Gelder's plans, leading to the developer putting a bounty on the shark. The bounty hunters take heavy casualties and rapidly become more extreme, culminating in explosives opening up a volcanic rift under the island. In the chaos Mason is killed by Hook Jaw, and his furious native friend Sharkie kills Gelder in revenge as El Salvados is evacuated. Hook Jaw, finding the seas around the island polluted, moves on again.

Hook Jaw ended up in the English Channel in the midst of a criminal gang's attempts to hijack a shipment of gold bullion. The shark's feeding prevents the gang from getting their loot to shore, and gang-leader Jack Gunn is the latest to become obsessed with killing Hook Jaw before a Royal Navy minesweeper appeared and arrested the criminals.

Thereafter Hook Jaw prowled the Atlantic Ocean before seemingly being destroyed by a treasure hunter's exploding ship.

== Collected editions ==
Title	ISBN	Publisher	Release date	Contents
Action - The Story of a Violent Comic	9781852860233	Titan Books	11 August 1990	Material from Action 14 February to 16 October 1976
The Collected Hook Jaw Vol. 1	9780955473302	Spitfire Comics	1 February 2007	Material from Action 14 February to 16 October 1976
Hook Jaw Volume 1	9781782768050	Titan Books	15 August 2017	Material from Hook Jaw #1-5
Hook Jaw	9781782768043	Titan Books	26 September 2017	Material from Action 14 February to 16 October 1976

== Reception ==
Reviewing the 2017 Titan collected edition for Slings & Arrows, Ian Keogh gave the volume a broadly positive review, applauding the "hilariously bad taste" and that "Hook Jaw's episodes follow a formula, in small doses it's still a thrilling and often funny formula", but felt that ultimately the strip had already began to drop off in quality before the cancellation.
