= Gerry Finley-Day =

Scottish comic book writer

- Born: 1947 (age 78–79) Broughty Ferry, Dundee, Scotland
- Area: Writer
- Notable works: Rogue Trooper; The V.C.s; Fiends of the Eastern Front

Gerry Finley-Day (born 1947, in Broughty Ferry, Dundee) is a Scottish comics writer, prolific from the 1960s to the 1980s, best known as the creator of "Rogue Trooper".

== Career ==
He began his career at D.C. Thomson & Co., before becoming the editor of IPC Media's girls' title Tammy in 1971, for which he wrote strips such as Ella on Easy Street and The Camp on Candy Island. Tammy's stories were full of cruelty and adversity, based on research showing that girls wanted stories that made them cry.

Finley-Day rose to become deputy managing editor of IPC's girls' comics department, but quit to become a freelance writer. In 1974 he was drafted in by Pat Mills to help develop characters for Battle Picture Weekly, launched the following year, for which he wrote Rat Pack, The Sarge, The Bootneck Boy, D-Day Dawson, Return of the Eagle, Sergeant Without Stripes, Cold Steele, Skreamer of the Stukas, Glory Rider, Cooley's Gun, Action Force, One-Eyed Jack and many others. He had a penchant for creating honourable German heroes, including Fighter from the Sky, Panzer G-Man, Commando King, Sea Wolf, and perhaps the best known, Hellman of Hammer Force, which started out in Action and transferred to Battle after Action was merged into it. Other strips he wrote for Action include Green's Grudge War and Dredger.

Finley-Day was one of the mainstays of early 2000 AD, writing Invasion!, Dan Dare, Fiends of the Eastern Front, and a couple of early episodes of Judge Dredd, and became their specialist in future war stories, first with The V.C.s, and then his most enduring character, Rogue Trooper, which still features occasionally, written by other writers — although Finley-Day returned to the character for a one-off story in 2010. He also wrote Blackhawk for Tornado, and several strips for the revived Eagle, including Saddle Tramp, Sergeant Streetwise, Jake's Platoon, The Hand, and episodes of The Collector. In August 2022, Rebellion published The Best of Gerry Finley-Day with a short UK booking signing tour at Forbidden Planet shops. The book includes the full Harry 20 on the High Rock as well as excerpts from Dan Dare and the V.C.s

== Bibliography ==
Comics work includes:

- Slaves of 'War Orphan Farm' (in Tammy 6 February 1971 to 17 July 1971)
- The Camp on Candy Island (in Tammy 28 October 1972 to 19 May 1973)
- Serfs of the Swamps (in Tammy 13 September 1975 to 22 November 1975)
- Invasion! (in 2000 AD #2-6, 8-35, 37-38, 40 & 42-51, 1977–78)
- Judge Dredd: "The Solar Sniper" (with Ron Turner, in 2000 AD #19, 1977)
- Dan Dare (in 2000 AD #28-51 & 64-66, 1977–78)
- Ant Wars (in 2000 AD #71-85, 1978)
- Blackhawk (in Tornado #4-22, 1979)
- Disaster 1990 (in 2000 AD # 119-139, 1979)
- The V.C.s (in 2000 AD 140-143, 145-165, 168-169 & 171-175, 1979–1980)
- Fiends of the Eastern Front (in 2000 AD # 152-161, 1980)
- Rogue Trooper (in 2000 AD #228-232, 234-243 & 246-258, 1981–82)
- Father's Footsteps (in Tammy 1982)
- Cross on Court (in Tammy 1982)
- Rae Rules OK (in Tammy 1982)
- Jaws Three (in Tammy 21 May 1983 to 25 June 1983)
- Sgt. Streetwise (in Eagle #1-11, 1982)
- Rogue Trooper (in 2000 AD #260-62, 1982 Sci-Fi Special & #265-301, 1982–83)
- Saddle Tramp (in Eagle #14-26, 1982)
- Sgt. Streetwise (in Eagle #27-31, 1982)
- Harry Twenty on the High Rock (in 2000 AD #287-307, 1982–83)
- Sgt. Streetwise (in Eagle #32-38, 1982)
- Rogue Trooper (in 2000 AD #303-355, 1983–84)
- Jake's Platoon (in Eagle #41-57, 1983)
- Sgt. Streetwise (in Eagle #41-43 & 46-48, 1983)
- The Hand (in Eagle from #70-93 and continuing, 1983–84)
- Sgt. Streetwise (in Eagle #76-78, 1983)
- Rogue Trooper (in 2000 AD #358-364, 366-392, 1983–84)
- Rogue Trooper (in 2000 AD #401-406, 410-419, 422-426 & 428-432, 1985)
- Rogue Trooper (in 2000 AD #444-449, 1985)
- Rogue Trooper (in 2000 AD #2011, 2010)
