= Action (comics) =

British weekly comic

- The cover of the 14 August 1976 edition of Action, spotlighting "Death Game 1999", "Hook Jaw", "Look Out for Lefty!" and "Hell's Highway".

Publication information
- Publisher: IPC Magazines
- Schedule: Weekly
- Format: Ongoing series
- Genre: Action/adventure
- Publication date: 14 February 1976 – 5 November 1977
- No. of issues: 86 (Note: An additional 23 Oct 1976 issue was created but not distributed; no issues were produced between 30 October and 27 November 1976)

Creative team
- Created by: Pat Mills; Geoff Kemp
- Written by: Ken Armstrong; Chris Lowder; Steve MacManus; Pat Mills; Tom Tully; John Wagner
- Artist(s): Massimo Belardinelli; Mike Dorey; Ramon Sola; Mike White
- Editor(s): Pat Mills; Geoff Kemp; John Smith; Sid Bicknell

Action was a British weekly boys' comic published by IPC Magazines from 14 February 1976 to 5 November 1977, when it merged with war comic Battle after 86 issues. The comic was created by Pat Mills and Geoff Kemp.

While initially a sales success, the comic quickly received media criticism for its violent content, causing a moral panic that ultimately saw it withdrawn from sale by IPC in October 1976, amid rumours it was to be banned. Action returned two months later in a much-sanitised form, quickly losing readers and being cancelled the following year. Despite its short lifespan, Action was highly influential on the British comics scene, and was a direct forerunner of the long-running 2000 AD.

== Creation ==
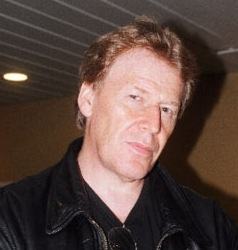
Pat Mills in 2003.

After a successful stint working on various IPC girls' comics, Pat Mills had interviewed for the vacant position of managing editor at the company. Mills felt the company's output had grown stale and outdated and told the board so, and wasn't offered the job due to his forthright criticism. However, his fresh ideas had been noted by editorial director John Sanders, who likewise felt the company's comics needed an overhaul but found it politically difficult to do so due to the long-serving, well-connected nature of much of the company's staff. He was impressed enough to remember Mills when charged with creating an answer to DC Thomson's Warlord comic, assigning Mills and his fellow freelancer John Wagner to create Battle Picture Weekly in 1974. Despite internal friction from the bypassed staff the comic was a major triumph, and Sanders quickly moved to use them elsewhere in IPC's boys adventure division.

Wagner was given editorship of Valiant, which had been the company's leading title of the sixties but was now increasingly outdated, while Mills was tasked with creating a new weekly. Having learnt about Mills' perfectionism in the launch of Battle – which required the guidance of veteran Dave Hunt to make its launch date – Mills was given a choice of staff editors to work with, picking the experienced Geoff Kemp. Kemp had a long history with the company, including a sizeable stint as assistant editor of Lion (which he had helped update in the mid-1960s, being the driving force behind the introduction of the likes of anti-hero The Spider) but was identified by Sanders and Mills as one of the staff most open to new ideas. The pair were given three months to put the comic together from scratch; while Mills felt this was a "ridiculously short time", the more seasoned Kemp would later note it was the longest run-in he had ever known. The pair quickly settled on a formula of taking extant story ideas, approaching them from a different angle and injecting a large amount of contemporary realism. Mills envisioned making a title that appealed to children that didn't read comics rather than simply trying to draw an audience from other titles, and as such aimed to make the title streetwise and more in touch.

Following this template, the pair looked at the blockbuster film Jaws and switched the perspective by following the shark, while making many of the human characters unsympathetic, to create "Hook Jaw". "Hellman of Hammer Force" took the old staple of World War II but followed an Axis protagonist in the form of fiercely principled tank commander Major Kurt Hellman. According to Mills, Sanders was initially reluctant about running the story, but was worn down by repeated requests. "Dredger" applied the hard-edged ethos of Clint Eastwood's Dirty Harry to the spy genre. "Blackjack" was a boxing story, but unlike those featured previously in the likes of Tiger and Valiant not only took a closer look at corruption in the sport but also featured a black protagonist, infused with the brashness of Muhammad Ali; Mills would later recall some of IPC's staff felt Barron being black would make the strip unpopular, and urging him to change the character to a white man with a black sidekick. A similarly unsentimental view of athletics and youth was evident in "Sport's Not For Losers!", about a working class lout who smoked but had an unexpected talent for long-distance running. For "The Running Man", Mafiosi and a face-swap were added to the format of The Fugitive. The obligatory football strip, "Play Till You Drop!", featured a player controlled by a blackmailing journalist, while "The Coffin Sub" featured a captain wracked with survivor's guilt wondering if he was leading his new crew to their deaths. Rejected were an ecologically tinged fishing story (dropped when a dummy episode proved too bleak) and a story about a photographer with a knack of getting in the thick of unpleasant situations, as well as World War I aviation strip "The Suicide Club" by Kelvin Gosnell (which was eventually used as a one-off in the 1976 Action Special).

They also looked at the editorial content, feeling that this also dated their competitors by generally being too paternal and condescending. Steve MacManus, who was writing "The Running Man" and "Sport's Not For Losers!", found himself corralled into the role of 'ActionMan', whereby readers would set the unfortunate writer bizarre stunts; MacManus would be photographed doing the winning entry and the reader who submitted it would be awarded with £10. MacManus also handled running the letters column, taking on the persona of a put-upon dogsbody forever trying to avoid tyrannical editor Peg-Leg and have a cup of tea in peace. Readers were encouraged to submit bizarre and stupid questions to resident 'Knowall' Milton Finesilver and, most anarchically, to nominate a public figure as 'Twit of the Week'. Each 'Twit' would have their portrait printed together with a pithy dismissal of whatever they had done to invoke the readership's ire. Bamber Gascoigne, Nicholas Parsons, Russell Harty, The Bay City Rollers, Malcolm Allison and Tony Blackburn were among those honoured. The idea was to let the readers know they considered them as equals – in the words of MacManus, to let readers know "We know what you're thinking". As with Battle, the plan was for Mills and Kemp to bed in the new title and then hand it over to an experienced editor for week-to-week running.

Mills purposefully modelled the page layouts on infamous British tabloid newspaper The Sun, later explaining: -

My thinking was to play them at their own game and use that approach to do Action... figure out how the popular culture media indoctrinates readers with their establishment shite and rival it with equally popular counter-culture. So don't do a version of Oz or International Times, as much as I admire them, as that will have limited appeal to kids, but do a subversive equivalent of mainstream media culture.

— Pat Mills, "The Sevenpenny Nightmare!", Judge Dredd Megazine List of Action stories#379 (17 January 2017)

Doug Church worked as art director on the comic, as he had done on Battle. The plan was originally to name the new comic 'Boots' or 'Dr. Martens' (in honour of the tough kid's footwear of choice) but instead Mills chose 'Action'. He initially wanted to call it Action 76 and change the number incrementally to emphasise the comic's up to date nature, but this went down poorly with newsagents and the idea was dropped.

== Publishing history ==
The cover to the first issue of Action, cover-dated 14 February 1976

Backed by a television advertising campaign the first issue sold 250,000 copies – a sizeable figure at the time. As was standard for the industry figures soon dropped to a respectable range of 160,000 to 170,000. However, instead of dropping further they stabilised and then actually started to increase as word-of-mouth spread, and IPC's post room was swamped by reader's letters. Having learnt of Action, IPC's rival DC Thomson brought out Bullet in response; however, produced by the same hands as Victor, Hornet and Hotspur it failed to make much of an impression. In the early days of the comic, Mills was very hands-on, rewriting many of the scripts himself.

=== Controversy ===
Almost immediately Action's violence began to attract attention from the press. On 23 February 1976, The London Evening Standard ran an article on the comic, criticising its bloodletting. More sustained criticism came from The Sun, which dissected Action on 30 April 1976. As author Martin Baker has noted, the article itself was relatively balanced but the headline – "The Sevenpenny Nightmare", in reference to the notorious Victorian penny dreadfuls – set the tone for a campaign against the title's immorality. However, the excellent sales led to the creative staff being egged on in some cases.

Meanwhile, the comic continued, and the first round of changes to the contents were instigated. "The Coffin Sub" and "Play Till You Drop" proved unpopular with readers and were ejected in favour of World War II commando story "Green's Grudge War" and a new football strip, "Look Out for Lefty!". The latter revolved around the supremely gifted but short-tempered Kenny 'Lefty' Lampton, a borderline thug whose off-the-pitch life rang more true than the kidnappings and assassination plots faced by Roy of the Rovers. May saw the Northern poverty of "Sport's Not For Losers!" swapped out for "Death Game 1999", a highly violent lift of successful sci-fi film Rollerball, and in June trucking drama "Hell's Highway" replaced "The Running Man". John Smith meanwhile took over the editorship from Kemp; his previous experience had largely been with nursery titles. The creative teams on the various strips meanwhile revelled in treading new ground and pushing boundaries.

Meanwhile, the press attention on the title refused to go away. Self-appointed public guardian Mary Whitehouse and her NVLA – influential with the powerful tabloid press and Parliament – took a sojourn from trying to remove violence from television to begin campaigning against Action. Another moralistic pressure group, Delegates Opposing Violent Education, threatened to have its members deface Action in newsagents by adding stickers denouncing the publication as being in violation of the Children and Young Persons (Harmful Publications) Act 1955. Denis Gifford, a former cartoonist turned comics historian whose books had made him the doyen of British comics, gave colour quotes negatively comparing Action to his beloved nonviolent pre-war comics such as Happy Days. Much of the reportage drew comparisons between Action and the lurid pre-code American horror titles of the 1950s, which had been banned in Britain by the act of Parliament.

Sanders became the public face of Action's defence, stoutly maintaining it was still less violent than numerous popular films and television shows. However, behind the scenes he attempted to moderate the comic. Despite his efforts, in September 1976 criticism reached a new level. Two strips brought particular attention. New addition "Kids Rule O.K." featured a version of present-day Britain where a disease suddenly killed off the world's adult population, leaving the country filled with tough gangs of teenagers fighting to survive, while "Look Out for Lefty!" covered the player's breakthrough into the first team. In the latter, Lefty's iconoclasm had created an enemy among his team-mates who went out of their way to disrupt the title character's game. Seeing this from the terraces, Lefty's spiky girlfriend Angie threw a bottle at the attacker, knocking him out and allowing Lefty's talent to shine through. At the time football hooliganism was on a sharp rise and the press accused the comic of endorsing such behaviour, with noted referee Jack Taylor among those to supply condemnatory statements to the tabloids. The same 18 September edition had also launched "Kids Rule O.K." with a front cover – rendered by Carlos Ezquerra – featuring a bike chain wielding youth against a background of urban devastation, standing over what appeared to be the body of a policeman. While in typical comic style the cover image was only tangentially related to the strip itself, the image was seized on by the press as an example of the comic's attempts to corrupt the nation's youth. The artist would later claim this was caused by the colourist, and the helmet and the prone figure were not meant to be related. The controversy was such that a bemused Stan Lee, visiting to do the promotional rounds for Marvel UK's launch of Captain Britain, found himself being questioned about it.

=== Withdrawal ===
With the attention not going away, the BBC arranged for Sanders to be interviewed live on their popular prime time magazine show Nationwide. At the time the programme's main studio anchor was Frank Bough, who was – before his private life was revealed by the press to involve wearing lingerie for cocaine-fuelled orgies with prostitutes – one of the most trusted faces on television. Sanders was given a list of questions he would be asked, which Bough promptly ignored in favour of excoriating his guest for warping children. A blindsided Sanders attempted to rally, but after the broadcast the IPC board intervened and after the 16 October 1976 issue Action was pulled from circulation. Sanders reportedly only found out about the withdrawal by reading about it in newspapers when on holiday in Spain.

The decision to withdraw had actually been made some seven weeks before, that being the lead-in for the printing cycle; IPC resisted calls to pull production on comics they had already paid for. However, the 23 October edition only got as far as a small run of 30 copies (an internal policy allowing a comic to be given final checks before a full print run was made). The precise reason for this step, unprecedented for a publisher that valued sales above all else, has been a matter for debate; Baker has speculated several factors combined to lead to the title being withdrawn. It is often stated that newsagents threatened to either refuse to stock Action or all IPC comics. However of the two largest distributors in the UK at the time John Menzies only sent a note expressing concern about the criticism of Action, while Baker's research was only able to conclusively verify that WHSmith only threatened either only honour orders for reserved copies or not provide promotional support for any relaunches, though he found there were many second-hand accounts of the threat from those inside IPC at the time.

Another suggested factor was internal politicking. Many of the IPC staff, particularly the boys' adventure division, had greatly resented being bypassed for Battle and then Action, but strong sales had prevented them from protesting. Many had been with the company for decades and had good relations with the board, particularly the influential Jack Le Grand, the driving force behind the creation of Valiant. Like the staff, the board was distinctly traditionalist and many held personal views closer to those of Whitehouse than of Action's creators and readers. Further friction came from freelancers such as Mills being paid better than their equivalent staffers. Mills himself would later feel that after he stepped away Action "went too far".

=== Return, decline and cancellation ===
Smith was removed, with much of the blame being put on his inexperience with adventure comics meaning he lost control of the creative teams. The traditionalist Sid Bicknell, a former Valiant editor, took over and Sanders was tasked by the board with approving every single page. Baker was able to view a copy of the 23 October issue during production of Action – A Violent Comic, and compare it to the heavily cannibalised version that would become the 4 December edition, and identified a large number of edits for both violence and political content. Other overt changes were the removal of "Kids Rule OK" and "The Probationer" entirely, replaced by motor racing story "Roaring Wheels" and "Double Dynamite" (a boxing story about a white man with a black sidekick), while "Death Game 1999" was renamed "Spinball". "Double Dynamite" and fellow post-suspension introductions "Jinx Jackson" and "The Loner" were described by Andrew Screen as "standard boy’s adventure strips that could feature in any other contemporary comic", and therefore proof that Action's "edge had gone".

The new, safer Action failed to sell as well as readers swiftly realised it was largely the same as previous boys' comics and in November 1977 it was merged into Battle after sales fell to an unprofitable 70,000. "Hellman of Hammer Force" (which had ironically avoided heavy censure and had actually featured more deaths after the suspension), "Dredger" and "Spinball" would continue, though the latter pair were reconfigured and only "Hellman of Hammer Force" would run for any considerable length of time. In the meantime, Mills and Wagner had been reunited by Sanders, and successfully launched the science fiction boys' weekly 2000 AD in 1977.

== Legacy ==
Mills has credited his overall experience with Action as being crucial to 2000 AD, both in terms of taking on writing more of the contents himself instead of editing and in terms of learning what was and wasn't going to get unwanted attention. As he noted some years later, "We just kept saying it that they're robots or androids that are getting their heads blown off!". Many of the Action contributors would play key roles in 2000 AD's formative years.

A decade after the cancellation, "Dredger", "The Coffin Sub" and "Play Till You Drop!" were among the contents of the short-lived 1987 reprint title All-Action Monthly. The following year portions of "Dredger" and "Hook Jaw" were included in the 224-page softback Big Adventure Book special, alongside reprints of the likes of "The Steel Claw" and "One-Eyed Jack".

In 1990 Titan Books released Action – The Story of a Violent Comic written by Martin Barker. This was a history of the comic, as well as a study of the effects of the ban. In this book Barker revealed that 30 copies of the pulped 23 October 1976 issue were saved and the book prints many of the strips from that issue, plus following issues thanks to Barker coming into possession of unpublished art. The book reveals just how much Action was being censored at an editorial level, and the route the title was heading in before it was cancelled. In 2007, Spitfire Comics released a collection of the pre-ban "Hook Jaw" strips in Collected Hook Jaw vol.1.

=== Revivals ===
Since 2016 the rights to Action and its contents have been owned by Rebellion Developments. In 2017, Rebellion leased the rights to "Hook Jaw" to Titan Comics, who produced a five-part mini-series written by Simon Spurrier and drawn by Conor Boyle, and also published a collected edition of the Action strips to tie in with the series.

In 2020 Rebellion published an Action Special 2020 under its Treasury of British Comics imprint. The special included new strips for "Kids Rule O.K." (by Ram V and Henrik Sarlström), "Hellman of Hammer Force" (by Garth Ennis and original artist Mike Dorey), "Hook Jaw" (by Quint Amity and Dan Lish) and "Dredger" (by Zina Hutton and Staz Johnson), as well as Henry Flint's "Hell Machine". The Special also included a cover-to-cover reprint of the previously unpublished 23 October 1976 edition of Action. Ennis won the 2021 Irish Comics News Award for Best Irish Writer for his story. but other elements of the special were not as well received. The company also published a collected edition of the "Hellman of Hammer Force" collected edition in 2021.

In June 2022 they followed up with a hardcover Battle Action Special with new stories featuring characters from both comics, all written by Ennis and with various artists, with new "Dredger" and "Kids Rule O.K." stories. This had a more positive reception. Starting in May 2023, Rebellion published a five-issue series of Battle Action, with each issue featuring two complete stories, once again written by Ennis. In 2024, ten further issues were announced, beginning in that year.

== Spinoffs ==
- Action Annual (9 editions, 1977 to 1985)
- Action Summer Special (5 editions, 1976 to 1980)

== Collected editions ==
Title	ISBN	Publisher	Release date	Contents
Action – The Story of a Violent Comic	9781852860233	Titan Books	11 August 1990	Material from Action 14 February to 16 October 1976
The Collected Hook Jaw Vol. 1	9780955473302	Spitfire Comics	1 February 2007	Material from Action 14 February to 16 October 1976
Hook Jaw	9781782768043	Titan Books	26 September 2017	Material from Action 14 February to 16 October 1976
Hellman of Hammer Force	9781781089422	Rebellion Developments	8 December 2021	Material from Action 14 February to 18 December 1976.
Action - Before the Ban: Volume 1	9781837866694 (regular hardback); 9781837866847 (webstore exclusive cover hardback)	Rebellion Developments	25 February 2026	The first twelve issues of Action, containing all of the strips and some of the editorial
Action - Before the Ban: Volume 2	9781837868933 (regular hardback); 9781837868995 (webstore exclusive cover hardback)	Rebellion Developments	22 April 2027	Collects issues 13 through to 24. This volume includes the dramatic conclusion of The Running Man, and the start of two new thrilling strips - Hell's Highway and the brutal, future sport tale, Death Game 1999.
