= Death Squad (British comics) =

British comic book story

- Death Squad as shown in the 12 July 1980 edition of Battle, art by Eric Bradbury.
- Publisher: IPC Magazines
- Publication date: 12 July 1980 – 4 June 1981
- Genre: War
- Title(s): Battle; 12 July 1980 to 4 June 1981; Battle Annual; 1982
- Main character(s): 'Grandad' Halbritter 'Frankie' Franke 'Swede' Norung 'Licker' Kopple; Gus Schdmidt

Creative team
- Writer(s): Alan Hebden (Note: Credited as 'Mark Andrew')
- Artist(s): Eric Bradbury
- Editor(s): Terry Magee

"Death Squad" is a British comic war story published in the weekly anthology Battle from 12 July 1980 to 4 June 1981 by IPC Magazines. Set during World War II, the story follows a Wehrmacht penal military unit spared death sentences in return for service on the Eastern front. It was written by Alan Hebden and drawn by Eric Bradbury.

== Creation ==
Since the debut of "Hellman of Hammer Force" in sister title Action, Battle had followed its example with strips featuring German protagonists, beginning with "Fighter from the Sky" in 1976, followed by the likes of "Panzer G-Man". Son of Battle's original technical advisor and occasional writer Eric Hebden, Alan Hebden began his writing career on War Picture Library and joined Battle soon after it launched, writing for "Rat Pack", "Major Eazy", "El Mestizo" and "The General Dies at Dawn", the latter having already featured a sympathetic German character. Hebden would later admit to having a fascination with the Eastern Front, and felt it was a theatre that was poorly represented in comics before Battle. He would later describe the comic as "a sort of German Rat Pack". Hebden was paired with experienced artist Eric Bradbury, who had served as an RAF tail-gunner in World War II before joining IPC's forerunner Amalgamated Press. His long list of credits for the company included "Mytek the Mighty", "The House of Dolmann" and "Cursitor Doom", as well as "Crazy Keller" and "Joe Two Beans" for Battle, having begun working for the war comic after the closure of Valiant.

== Publishing history ==
Despite initially being planned as only six parts, the story was published in Battle (at the time titled Battle Action after merging with Action) between 12 July 1980 and 4 June 1981. While the strip was published after Battle started crediting creators, Hebden was listed under the pseudonym 'Mark Andrew' as he was also working on "Fighting Mann". A story featuring the characters was printed in the 1982 edition of the Battle Annual, while the story was reprinted in Battle from 31 January 1987 to 23 January 1988.

Since 2016, the rights to the story have been owned by Rebellion Developments. In 2020, Rebellion issued the story in a collected edition as part of their Treasury of British Comics series.

== Plot summary ==
Five condemned Wehrmacht soldiers - World War I veteran 'Grandad' Halbritter, thief 'Frankie' Franke, conman Gus Schmidt, dim-witted lumberjack Gunnar 'Swede' Norung and vain former SS officer and Nazi sycophant 'Licker' Kopple - are deployed on the Eastern Front battling the Red Army in 1941 as a penal unit called Death Squad. Other German units treat them with disdain, and SS Major Brandt continually gives them suicidal missions. However, the group's pool of skills, quirks and desire for self-preservation frequently allows them to come up with unconventional tactics and survive to fight again. Brandt sent them to infiltrate Moscow's Red Square in disguise to find a T-34 factory, having to escape imprisonment and NKVD torture after Licker made an impromptu attempt to assassinate Josef Stalin; Death Squad were able to carry out the mission successfully, though Licker suffered a slipped disc and had to use a wheelchair.

In 1942 the group's transport train was caught in a snowdrift and they came under relentless attack from Soviet partisans led by the compassionate female fighter Mariola. While Death Squad battled their way back to German lines they found out their new commanding officer was Gruppenfeuhrer Horst von Tedermann, an SS sadist and favourite of Adolf Hitler - and a dead ringer for Licker. Grandad soon becomes aggrieved at von Tedermann's brutal scorched earth tactics, while Licker is forced to pose as von Tedermann to force the Partisans out so they could be massacred, only to be captured by Mariola. Von Tedermann's SS troops try to kill the squad, much to the displeasure of some of Grandad's friends in the Wehrmacht. As a result, they petition Reinhard Heydrich in Berlin, who orders von Tedermann killed – risking a civil war between the Wehrmacht and the SS. Grandad is able to rescue Licker and smuggle him back disguised as a burn victim. He then kills von Tedermann when he refuses to return to Berlin to explain himself, while Grandad allows Mariola to escape as long as she vows to give up her partisan activities.

The Death Squad were then moved to the Western Front as part of a garrison at a French port. While initially it seems a cushier job than fighting the Russians, the town soon comes under attack from British Commandos. Despite Grandad's best efforts the Death Squad, his old friend Kapitan Kreus and the other scant troops in the town are unable to prevent huge damage to the nearby U-Boat pens. Kreus and the Squad are arrested for cowardice; while the Death Squad are spared, they are forced to be the firing squad for Kreus, before shipping back off to the Eastern Front once again.

== Collected editions ==
Title	ISBN	Publisher	Release date	Contents
Death Squad	9781781087688	Rebellion Developments	4 November 2020	Material from Battle 12 July 1980 to 4 June 1981 and Battle Annual 1982

== Reception ==
Garth Ennis has gone on the record to state "Death Squad" is among his favourite Battle strips.
