= Baker's Half-Dozen =

British comic book story

- The cover to the 29 March 1980 edition of Speed, featuring Sarge Baker of "Baker's Half-Dozen".
- Publisher: IPC Magazines
- Publication date: 23 February – 16 August 1980
- Genre: War
- Title(s): Speed 23 February to 16 August 1980; Speed Annual 1981
- Main character(s): Sarge Baker; Pete Carey; Hardisty; Taff Moody; Joe Peach; Corporal Rudge; Perot Singh

Creative team
- Writer(s): Unidentified (Note: Speed did not carry credits on strips, and documentation from the era has not survived; Stephen Jewell has speculated that it may have been written by Angus Allan.)
- Artist(s): Mike Western
- Editor(s): Barrie Tomlinson

"Baker's Half-Dozen" is a British comic war story published in the weekly anthology Speed from 23 February to 16 August 1980, published by IPC Magazines. The story is set in the North African campaign of World War II, and features six British Commonwealth stragglers formed into a unit by the mysterious 'Sarge' Baker.

== Creation ==
While the rest of the contents of Speed had a sporting bent to fit in with the title, as a war story "Baker's Half-Dozen" was an incongruous inclusion despite attempts to play up the title unit's fast-moving tactics. Speed editor Barrie Tomlinson was unable to recall how the story had ended up in the magazine, referring to its placement as "a strange one". For some years he thought it was a reprint as he created all of the other stories in Speed himself. Tomlinson has speculated that the story was rejected from another IPC title, suggesting war comic Battle as the most likely source, and was possibly included to replace a strip vetoed by IPC management. As such the writer of the story is currently unknown; in a 2019 article on Speed for Judge Dredd Megazine, Stephen Jewell speculated that it was "most probably" written by Angus Allan. The artist however has been firmly identified as veteran Mike Western.

== Publishing history ==
The story ran in black-and-white three-page instalments in Speed from 23 February to 16 August 1980. However, while the magazine initially sold respectably, reader research indicated that "Baker's Half-Dozen" was one of the less popular series, and it was replaced from the 23 August 1980 edition of Speed, replaced by another World War II story - aerial combat serial "Hit and Run". A text story featuring the characters was included in the 1981 Speed Annual.

In 2014, small Irish publisher Hibernia Books licensed the serial from Egmont Publishing. Hibernia publisher Dave McDonald considered the story a "great, self-contained action strip, which was like a cross between The Sarge and Darkie's Mob". The limited-edition 70 page paperback collection was issued in November 2014 and featured both a foreword and a pin-up illustration by 2000 AD artist Rufus Dayglo and a cover by Richard Pearce. The contents of Speed were among the post-1970 IPC Magazines/Fleetway Publications properties purchased by Rebellion Developments in 2016.

== Plot summary ==
As the British Eighth Army is routed by an Afrika Korps counter-attack in January 1942, Pete Carey and pretty boy Joe Peach are the only survivors of a column of Stuart tanks ambushed by Panzers. They escape to a nearby village only to find it has also been overrun, and discover just four survivors in hiding - Second Australian infantryman Hardisty, Army Catering Corps Corporal Rudge, 'Taff' Moody of the Royal Welch Fusiliers and Perot Singh from the 3rd Indian Motor Brigade. Demoralised and far behind the retreating British lines, the group are about to surrender to a German half-track when a crazed man with sergeant stripes tattooed on his arm, handcuffs hanging from one wrist and a Bren gun kills the would be-captors. He introduces himself as Sarge Baker, and tells the group that under his command they will fight their way back to friendly lines - whether they like it or not.

The group finds a wrecked motorpool, and Carey is able to refashion wrecked motorbikes into a pair of three-man vehicles he christens 'Sand-Jockeys'. The unit head out into open desert, evading German troops and Junkers Ju 87 dive-bombers. While most of the soldiers respond well to Baker's all-action style of command, Rudge gradually develops a dislike of the enigmatic sergeant. They destroy a German detachment at a watering hole, finding they were escorting a Waffen-SS colonel carrying important dispatches revealing the location of a secret communications centre at El Homra. Baker decides the group will attack it themselves, leading Rudge to talk Moody into escaping in the night with the team's food and water. The pair blunder into a German patrol but are rescued by Baker, who disciplines the pair. He then leads them to a successful attack on El Homra; the Germans send out an expert sniper known only as the Limping Vulture - an old enemy of Baker's - to pick off the squad in response, wounding Carey and Hardisty. Baker is able to capture him, and beats the Vulture unconscious when he tries to tell the men about the reason for his handcuffs. During a firefight, Rudge and Moody try to get to the Vulture and find out more but the man is shot before he can tell them anything.

A friendly fire incident sees Baker shoot down an RAF Bristol Blenheim; the unit tries to rescue the surviving crew before roving Tuareg nomads kill them. The tribesmen take Baker hostage; Rudge and Moody lobby to leave him behind, until Carey points out that Baker has all their maps, and the radio in the Blenheim has been wrecked in the crash. They rescue him and soon run into a Long Range Desert Group who take them to British lines. The LRDG's base is under the command of Major John Braggat, whom Baker is eager to confront. Baker and Braggat had been on a patrol six months earlier when they had been caught by the Vulture, and the Major had bought his freedom by giving their captors vital British intelligence. The Germans had planned to execute Baker by leaving him in the desert handcuffed to a wooden post; he chewed through the post to get free. Moody and Rudge make one final attempt to kill Baker, but are overwhelmed by Singh and Peach. The remaining unit prepares to hand the three traitors over - but first Baker orders Peach to fetch a saw and cut the handcuffs off his wrist.

== Collected edition ==
Title	ISBN	Publisher	Release date	Contents
Baker's Half-Dozen	N/A	Hibernia Books	November 2014	Material from Speed 23 February to 16 August 1980 and Speed Annual 1981.

== Reception ==
Lew Stringer praised the production values of the Hibernia collection, while also feeling Western's "powerful, tough artwork" made the story memorable. David McDonald would reaffirm his belief that "Baker's Half-Dozen" was among Western's best work in a blog article for Rebellion Developments' Treasury of British Comics website.
