= Johnny Red =

British comic book story

- Johnny Red on the cover of the 28 April 1986 edition of Battle, art by Carlos Pino.
- Publisher: IPC Magazines
- Publication date: 29 January 1977 – 17 January 1987
- Genre: War
- Title(s): Battle; 29 January 1977 to 17 January 1987
- Main character: Johnny 'Red' Redburn

Creative team
- Writer(s): Tom Tully; James Nicholas
- Artist(s): Joe Colquhoun; John Cooper; Carlos Pino
- Editor(s): Dave Hunt; Terry Magee; Richard Burton

"Johnny Red" is a British comic war story published in the weekly anthology Battle Picture Weekly from 29 January 1977 to 17 January 1987 by IPC Magazines. Set during World War II, the story follows Johnny 'Red' Redburn, a British pilot leading the Falcon Squadron unit of the Soviet Air Forces on the Eastern Front. Written by Tom Tully and initially drawn by Joe Colquhoun, the strip was the longest-running in Battle's history, only ending in 1987 when financial constraints saw it switched to reprints.

== Creation ==
Battle editor Dave Hunt commissioned the story as part of his attempt to balance the different services depicted in the comic, which was lacking an enduring aerial serial. He spoke to Tom Tully, an experienced and prolific writer with long stints on "The Steel Claw", "Mytek the Mighty" and "Roy of the Rovers" among his many credits, not to mention strips for Battle such as "The Team That Went To War". Tully came up with the title "Johnny Red"; Hunt would later speculate that Tully came up with good titles first before inventing a story to fit them. The pair went backwards and forwards over how to make the idea of a British pilot serving on the Eastern Front, and picked the doughty Hawker Hurricane as the character's plane of choice – a decision Garth Ennis would describe as "the perfect mount for the down-at-heel, working class Johnny Redburn". For an artist, Hunt was delighted to find that Joe Colquhoun, another veteran who also had a long history with "Roy of the Rovers", was available.

At the time few comics had depicted the Eastern Front, let alone with a sympathetic view of the Soviet Union, due to the tensions of the Cold War. The initial episodes were inspired by Arthur Burr, an RAF pilot who used a Hurricat to protect an Arctic convoy before flying the fighter to a safe landing in Russia in September 1942.

== Publishing history ==
"Johnny Red" debuted in the hundredth issue of Battle Picture Weekly, cover-dated 29 January 1977 – a mini-relaunch that also saw the launch of "Joe Two Beans" and crossover "Major Eazy vs. Rat Pack".

The strip soon became a fast favourite with readers, and in 1979 was the most popular in the comic. Hunt then made the risky decision of moving Colquhoun off the strip to work on Pat Mills' World War I epic "Charley's War". Instead John Cooper, who had worked on John Wagner's "One-Eyed Jack" and also "Dredger" (as well as episodes of "Judge Dredd" and "M.A.C.H. 1" for 2000 AD), took over. While briefly daunted at following Colquhoun (recalling he "had a nice style, but was a bugger for detail"), Cooper leapt at the chance and soon found a rhythm with the strip. Cooper and Tully would remain as the creative team for the next six years, and the artist would later claim "I can draw him while blindfolded. Nearly."

While "Johnny Red" remained popular with readers, as the 1980s progressed sales of both Battle and comics began to decline, and new editor Terry Magee attempted to update the title, including producing a set of licensed strips based on Palitoy's Action Force toyline. From September 1984 Cooper was moved across to Action Force, with Spanish artist Carlos Pino taking over on "Johnny Red". During 1986, James Nicholas would contribute occasional scripts due to Tully's large number of other commitments. Nevertheless, the strip continued to be popular, and was left as one of the few new features still running after the Action Force licence moved to Marvel UK at the end of 1986. However, sales of Battle were falling fast; an ever-increasing amount of the comic was switched to reprints, and "Johnny Red" followed suit after the 17 January 1987 edition. Battle itself would only last a year longer before being merged with Eagle, where the reprints of "Johnny Red" would continue until 14 October 1989.

Steve MacManus, Battle's assistant editor at the time of the strip's creation and later long-time editor of 2000 AD, would later highly praise "Johnny Red", believing it to be Tully's best work. He would later recall "what impressed me about Johnny Red were the incredible scenes of the Russians as heroes".

The rights to the original material in Battle were among the IPC Youth Group properties consolidated into the resurrected Fleetway Publications and sold to Persimmon BPCC Publishing on 6 July 1987, and were later purchased by Egmont Publishing. From 1 April 2009, Egmont UK in conjunction with W H Smith announced 4 special reprint collections from their stable, including a collection of Battle strips. Two episodes of "Johnny Red" was included in the magazine.

=== Titan Comics ===
Subsequently, Titan Comics began licensing various strips from Battle and issuing them in hardback compendiums. Collected editions of "Johnny Red" proved among the most popular, and four volumes were issued between 2010 and 2016.

Avid Battle reader Garth Ennis was a fan of the character – describing it as his "favorite strip in Battle from the get-go" - and he later became a professional comics writer. He included Johnny Red in his 2000 AD story "Time Flies", one episode of which started with a pastiche Battle strip before protagonist Bertie Sharp appeared and stole Johnny's Hurricane, and Ennis later commissioned a drawing of the character from Cooper. In 2015, Ennis and artist Keith Burns produced a new eight-part limited series featuring the character for Titan.

=== Rebellion Developments ===
Since 2016, the rights to the story have been owned by Rebellion Developments. In June 2022, Rebellion published a hardcover Battle Action Special with new stories featuring characters from both comics, written by Ennis and with various artists, including a new "Johnny Red" story by Ennis and Burns. The strip saw the character fight another Battle aviator, Otto Skreamer. Subsequently, multi-episode stories by Ennis and Burns were published in new issues of Battle Action.

== Plot summary ==
19-year old Liverpudlian Johnny "Red" Redburn is serving in the galley of a merchant ship on an Arctic convoy to the Soviet Union in November 1941; he had previously joined the RAF but was thrown out in disgrace following a training accident that kills an instructor. The convoy comes under Luftwaffe attack; the vessel he is onboard is a CAM ship, but the pilot for the catapult-launched Hawker Hurricane is killed in an explosion. Johnny boards the plane, and despite his nervousness shoots down two of the German raiders and drives the rest off. Afraid that if he ditches near the fleet his unauthorised piloting will see him court martialled and imprisoned, he instead flies to Russia and lands at a small airstrip on the Kola Peninsula, which turns out to be a forward airbase of the Soviet Air Forces 5th Air Brigade, known as the Falcons. Initially planning to link back up with the convoy, Johnny is highly impressed by the bravery of the Russian pilots, despite their obsolescent Polikarpov I-15 and I-16 aircraft. Realising he can do more for the war effort fighting in Russia than potentially being imprisoned at home, he volunteers to join the Falcons, under the acting command of Captain Alex Semoyov after the squadron leader is killed.

Johnny soon proves an invaluable fighter and helps motivate the Falcons, while making fast friends with bear-like fellow pilot Dimitry Yakob. However, the unit comes under the scrutiny of the NKVD, having been assigned to fight to the death – their continued survival being interpreted by Commissar Kraskin as evidence of cowardice. A Luftwaffe air raid interrupts the squadron's planned execution, and after landing elsewhere Johnny leads the squadron in extorting fresh, modern planes out of a depot manager leaving the Falcons with a selection of MiG, Lavochkin and Yakolev fighters. Despite their inexperience with the aircraft, the Falcons soon make a big impact on the invading Germans while continuing to give Kraskin the slip. The Commissar planned to kill Johnny himself by staging a friendly fire incident, while Redburn also makes a German archenemy of Luftwaffe ace Lieutenant Erich von Jurgen. Some of the pressure is relieved when Johnny saves the life of minister Nikita Lychenko, who nominates him for the Order of Lenin, and while he captures von Jurgen he refuses to have his rival killed in a cowardly fashion, allowing him to escape.

In January 1942, the Falcons were deployed as a fighter-bomber unit at the Murmansk front. The squadron gets a new commanding officer with in the ample shape of the cruel Colonel Grigor Yaraslov, who drives the pilots relentlessly, leading to a drastic rise in casualties as the German Army advances on Leningrad. Semoyov is killed as the brutal fighting reaches the city, as is his replacement Lieutenant Zagorny. The Falcons are rotated out for a week's leave at Murmansk, but Johnny clashes with Coppel, brother of the RAF instructor he killed, in the port. Coppel attempts to kill him with a Spitfire he was ferrying to Russia, but is shot down by Yakob and Rudi Vorishkin. The squadron then returns to the defence of the renamed Stalingrad, and after a gruelling battle the Germans are forced back, with Johnny fighting another duel with von Jurgen.

Redburn's increasing fame sees him given the highly important mission to fly diplomat Tokayev to a conference in Britain, with Yakob and Vorishkin joining him as the crew of the 'Flying Gun' a B-25 bomber modified to mount a dozen machine guns. Despite a perilous journey where all three Falcons are injured they make it to England, where Johnny flees for Liverpool to avoid questions from military intelligence. However, he finds his home has been bombed out; his father is dead and his mother badly injured, while authorities believe Redburn is a deserter. However, a recovered Rudi and Yakob conspire with Tokoyev to get him back as the Flying Gun's pilot, and feeling there is nothing left for him at home, he returns to Russia.

The trio return to find the Falcons in Stalingrad under the temporary command of Michanek, the only experienced pilot left after losses and the transfer of other surviving original Falcons Krasov and Gragori to a Sturmovik squadron. Their job is further made harder by another NKVD commissar, the slimy Rastovitch. Tokoyev arranges for Johnny to take command of the Falcons, and Redburn once again clashes with the NKVD to prevent mistreatment of prisoners, once again helping von Jurgen escape in return for the German ace inadvertently saving him from execution. The fighting in Stalingrad continues, and Redburn - now nicknamed the 'Red Devil', and wracked by nightmares of his dead comrades - works together with Captain Nina Petrova, a daring female Po-2 'sewing machine' biplane pilot, and he survives the bloody battle despite a loss of memory. A return to Murmansk initially fails to fully return his memory, though it returns in time to help Redburn defeat the Nazi ace known as the Black Butcher. However, further losses see him begin a long quest to find more pilots to join the Falcons.

Redburn then finds himself in combat with the Gang of Seven, a merciless group of pilots whose leader – a masked figure called the Bogeyman – was placed in charge of the Falcons. The Gang are gradually killed off, and Johnny eventually saves the Bogeyman even after he tried to turn him over to Nazi-sympathising partisans. Redburn is shaken by another encounter with von Jurgens, who had abandoned any veneer of chivalry. He is given a new customised blood-red De Havilland Mosquito and after mysterious dreams sets out to find the injured Yakob at his hometown of Lubyan, which is in the centre of vicious fighting due to its strategic position overlooking Kursk. Johnny heads in, accompanied by cowardly co-pilot Ratov, as he tries to find Yakob. He shoots down von Jurgens and fights through the streets before finding Yakob's body, cremating his friend.

In July 1943 the Falcons are assigned to Kursk, where they help break the German artillery. However, Rudi and Krasov are both killed in the battle. Redburn briefly becomes nihilistic and plans a suicidal attack on German positions, but eventually resolves to recruit a new squadron of Falcons in tribute to his friends. He leads the new outfit in his Hurricane, and is frequently haunted by visions of his old comrades. The new Falcons have to contend with the arrival of the Focke-Wulf Fw 190 on the Eastern Front, but nonetheless the unit takes shape. However, Johnny is recalled to England, with his Hurricane once again fitted to a catapult. Seeing little way out of it he goes along, arranging for Ratov to fly the Red Death to England as a potential escape route. He again takes off from the convoy when it comes under attack but this time is forced to ditch after conducting an aerial ramming attack on a torpedo bomber after his guns jam.

Arriving in Liverpool, he finds his mother had been killed in another bombing, while ministry official Fisher holds charges of impersonating an officer over Johnny, ordering him to function as a troubleshooter, with Ratov as his assistant. Their first assignment is to find out what is behind the bad luck being suffered by No. 191 Squadron; he eventually traces it to damaged aerials on the squadron's Mosquitos allowing water ingress. Next he is seconded to the Ninth Air Force, flying as a gunner on a B-17 Flying Fortress during a bombing raid on Fleigsburg. After the pilot of his plane is killed, Redburn takes over and bombs a German fighter base, incurring the wrath of squadron leader Joe Staples. However, the pair work together to mastermind a daring daylight bombing raid on German V-1 flying bomb bases, though Staples is killed during the operation.

Johnny and Ratov are then assigned to train Fleet Air Arm pilots on the newly commissioned aircraft carrier HMS Titan. He once again rapidly makes an enemy in the form of cowardly pilot Pelham. On arrival in Russia the unit are charged with ferrying Hurricanes and Typhoons to Russian units. Fearing disgrace, Pelham opts to fly into the Russian interior, with Redburn in pursuit. Johnny saves the man after he mistakenly lands in a prisoner-of-war camp. However, Pelham nevertheless frames him for murdering the crew of an RAF transport plane sent to collect him. He again finds that Falcon Squadron has been taken over by a group of brutal fliers led by Krupolev. Now personally equipped with a Typhoon, Johnny's job is made harder when Pelham is killed, with Krupolev offering to act as a witness in return for Redburn turning a blind eye to his savagery. While he loses his Typhoon, he is able to take control of a new tank-busting Hurricane Mark IV.

By 1944, the Russian Army is advancing west through Ukraine with Falcon Squadron at the fore, even briefly deploying on the ground to help a penal battalion capture a ridge. Redburn later joins an ultimately unsuccessful commando mission to rescue captured Soviet ace Dimitri Sigoriev. Johnny takes leave in Moscow, but finds his holiday disrupted by a desperate Luftwaffe pilot creating a hostage situation. Johnny then leads the Falcons to victory over Major Von Krull's Black Rain unit of Stuka dive-bombers.

After a confrontation with Messerschmitt Me 262 jets in 1945 wipes out the other Falcons, Johnny crashes his Hurricane. He awakens with a broken leg in a British field hospital and is returned to Britain, where news of his exploits brings a promotion to Squadron Leader and a medal. He is joined by the sole surviving Falcon, the injured Helga Kaganovitch, and loyal mechanic Rodimitz, who are on leave from a diplomatic flight and soon find the exploits of Johnny Red have made him a hero.

== Collected editions ==
Title	ISBN	Publisher	Release date	Contents
Johnny Red: Falcons' First Flight	1848560338	Titan Books	November 2010	
Johnny Red Volume 2: Red Devil Rising	1848560346	Titan Books	June 2012	
Johnny Red Volume 3: Angels over Stalingrad	1848564384	Titan Books	February 2013	
Johnny Red Volume 4: The Flying Gun	1848564449	Titan Books	September 2016	
Johnny Red: The Hurricane	9781837864201	Rebellion	January 2025	Johnny Red: The Hurricane #1-8 (originally published 2023/2024)
Johnny Red: A Couple of Heroes	9781837866571	Rebellion	January 2026	Battle Action Volume 3 issues 1-10 (originally published 2024/2025)
Johnny Red: Volume 1: The Falcons	9781837868513 (p/b); 9781837869206 (h/b)	Rebellion	November 2026	Battle 29th January 1977 - 23rd December 1978 "The first in a series collecting Johnny Red in its entirety, this volume presents the complete two-year run by original artist Joe Colquhoun, written by co-creator Tom Tully"; The hardback was a webstore exclusive.
