= Major Eazy =

British comic book character

- Major Eazy on the cover of the 10 January 1976 edition of Battle Picture Weekly. Art by Carlos Ezquerra.

Character information
- First appearance: Battle Picture Weekly (10 January 1976)

In-story information
- Species: Human
- Place of origin: Earth
- Team affiliations: British Army

Publication information
- Publisher: IPC Magazines
- Schedule: Weekly
- Title(s): Battle Picture Weekly; 10 January to 27 March 1976; 15 May 1976 to 23 April 1977; 19 November 1977 to 10 June 1978
- Formats: Original material for the series has been published as a strip in the comics anthology(s) Battle Picture Weekly.
- Genre: Action/adventure
- Publication date: 10 January 1976 – 10 June 1978

Creative team
- Writer(s): Alan Hebden
- Artist(s): Carlos Ezquerra
- Editor(s): Dave Hunt

Major Eazy is a British comic character, appearing in strips published by IPC Magazines. Eazy featured British comic war stories published in the weekly anthology Battle Picture Weekly from 10 January 1976 to 10 June 1978, written by Alan Hebden and drawn by Carlos Ezquerra. Set during World War II, the strips follow Eazy, an unconventional British Army officer with a laidback attitude.

== Creation ==
After the successful launch of Battle Picture Weekly in 1975 under the guiding hand of creators Pat Mills and John Wagner, editor Dave Hunt was left to manage the typical churn of a British anthology comic. This involved identifying stories that were unpopular with the readership (typically via reader correspondence, where children writing in were encouraged to rank the comic's contents) and commissioning replacements. While "D-Day Dawson", "Rat Pack" and "The Bootneck Boy" swiftly proved popular, replacing the less successful stories initially proved difficult, with new stories struggling to stick.

A breakthrough came in January 1976. A veteran of World War II, Eric Hebden had been appointed Battle's technical advisor at launch, and contributed many war stories to past IPC titles. As a result, he received contributor copies of the titles he worked with, which were devoured by his son Alan. In 1971, Alan Hebden began working for DC Thomson at his father's suggestion, later also contributing to Fleetway's War Picture Library. After Battle started he wrote scripts for "Rat Pack" before coming up with "Major Eazy".

Drawing the strip was Carlos Ezquerra, who had been headhunted for the comic and contributed to "Rat Pack" part-time while balancing work for DC Thomson. Hunt and assistant editor Steve MacManus were able to persuade him to switch full-time for "Major Eazy", and Ezquerra designed the character.

Normally when I design a new character I base it on some actor I really like. Then I can see them moving and acting when I am visualising the story. I didn't have a very refined style until I started doing Major Eazy, my style emerged from that. He was my kind of character, an anti-hero. It also suited me that he was scruffy. My art has never been very clean. Everything looks dirty with me, so Eazy fitted perfectly.

— Carlos Ezquerra, "None But The Brave", Judge Dredd Megazine #209 (26 August 2003)

Many have suggested he based Eazy on actor James Coburn, particularly his breakout role as Britt in the 1960 Western The Magnificent Seven. However, in a 2018 interview Alan Hebden denied Coburn was the inspiration, telling Stephen Jewell "Other people might have said that but he never did, and I never did." Instead he has noted Clint Eastwood's Man with No Name as an influence on Eazy. Hunt felt that Eazy's attitude reflected Hebden, who he recalled "was very laid-back himself", a sentiment echoed by Battle assistant editor Steve MacManus.

== Publishing history ==
The new story debuted in the 10 January 1976 edition of Battle Picture Weekly, announced on the front cover with the slogan "Like him - hate him! You can't ignore... Major Eazy!". The strip consisted of three-page stories which were largely self-contained - a format Hebden enjoyed, later stating it "was very good to do if I was planning on going on a long journey because I could write a dozen or more of them in just two weeks". While Hebden and Ezquerra had a good professional relationship the production of the strip was not completely without difficulty; in 2018, Hebden would recall having to rewrite an episode where Eazy had been originally planned to kill an SS officer in cold blood due to objections from Hunt.

The initial batch of episodes ran until the 27 March 1976, before the character returned for a second longer run from 15 May 1976. From 29 January 1977 the strip featured a crossover with Rat Pack and was renamed "Major Eazy versus Rat Pack" in reference to the antagonistic relationship between the characters; it was the first crossover between characters in Battle Picture Weekly - something which was rarely done in British anthologies at the time. Hunt would later admit the story was created as a solution to keep both popular characters in the comic while making room for new stories such as "Johnny Red". Following the end of the arc in April 1977, the character took another break while Ezquerra worked on designing Judge Dredd for 2000 AD before working on American Civil War story "El Mestizo" with Hebden for Battle before returning for one final batch of episodes from 19 November 1977 to 10 June 1978 before ending when Ezquerra left to work on "Strontium Dog" for Starlord.

In 2011 Titan Comics licensed the strip from then-current owners Egmont Publishing and issued the hardback collection Major Eazy: Heart of Iron (Volume 1). Despite the name, no further volumes followed. The rights to IPC's post-1970 library were purchased from Egmont by Rebellion Developments in 2016. In 2020 they issued a collected version of Major Eazy vs. Rat Pack under the Treasury of British Comics label, with the character's initial run being compiled as Major Eazy Volume One: The Italian Campaign following in 2021.

== Plot summary ==
British troops land on Sicily in July 1943, and a British Army unit receives an unorthodox commanding officer - the cheroot-smoking, shaggy-paired Major Eazy, driving an open-top Bentley scout car. Formerly a Long Range Desert Group soldier (where he had performed numerous actions against the Germans despite being partnered with Bedouin guide Tewfik, who made repeated attempts to kill him), Eazy soon proves to be a formidable shot with a high-velocity rifle, and is so laid back he takes a nap as soon as the first round of fighting is over. He soon wins the respect of his initially bemused Sergeant Daly and the rest of the men with a succession of laconic heroics - taking out a King Tiger with a well-placed rifle shot; coercing an SS officer into shaving him; shooting down a USAAF P-51 Mustang that misidentified their column as German; sniping Germans using children as human shields from a church steeple; singlehandedly wiping out a Wehrmacht flamethrower squad; using rats to take control of a castle; and saving an old friend from execution as he and his men advanced to Rome.

Eazy's dislike of ceremony saw him arrange an artillery barrage so he could feign cowardice in front of a Brigadier to avoid being given a medal. As the unit continued to saunter across Italy, with Eazy shooting a flower girl planning to blow up Allied troops; seeing to the death of a murderous Polish captain; thrashing a black marketeer; clashing with the Mafia; and defeating an E-Boat after a chase through the canals of Venice.

After the Rat Pack abandoned an injured Major Taggart to the mercies of the Gestapo, Eazy appointed himself the unit's commanding officer and badgered them into mounting a rescue mission.

== Collected editions ==
Title	ISBN	Publisher	Release date	Contents
Major Eazy: Heart of Iron (Volume 1)	1848564414	Titan Books	November 2010	Material from Battle 10 January to 27 March 1976
Major Eazy vs. Rat Pack	9781781088555	Rebellion Developments	30 September 2020	Material from Battle 29 January to 23 April 1977
Major Eazy Volume One: The Italian Campaign	9781781089811	Rebellion Developments	4 March 2021	Material from Battle 10 January 1976 to 22 January 1977

== Reception ==
MacManus would recall that "Major Eazy" was an instant hit with readers, "booting D-Day Dawson into touch fairly quickly", and praised the "relaxed, anti-authority attitude", while John Wagner would state the strip was where Ezquerra "really started to come into his own" Writing for The Guardian, John Plunkett also declared himself a fan of the character, and noted his resemblance to Coburn. Gordon Rennie would homage the character of Eazy in the "Cursed Earth Koburn" Judge Dredd story.

In his book on the British Invasion, Jochen Ecke analysed Major Eazy as an early example of the movement's style, noting the conscious unreality of the comic and its protagonist, also noting the strip's structure as posing a situation which Eazy would then solve in an unconventional way, feeling it challenged readers to guess his actions in lieu of questioning his eventual triumph.
