= Death squad (disambiguation) =

A death squad is an armed group whose primary activity is carrying out extrajudicial killings, massacres, or enforced disappearances as part of political repression, genocide, ethnic cleansing, or revolutionary terror.

Death squad may also refer to:

- Death Squad (Marvel comics)
- Death Squad (British comics)
- The Agent of Death, a novel republished in 1989 with the title The Death Squad
- The Death Squad (film), a 1974 American television crime drama film
