= El Mestizo =

British comic book story

- El Mestizo on the cover of the 4 June 1977 edition of Battle Picture Weekly, art by Carlos Ezquerra.
- Publisher: IPC Magazines
- Publication date: 4 June – 17 September 1977
- Genre: War
- Title(s): Battle; 4 June to 17 September 1977

Creative team
- Writer(s): Alan Hebden
- Artist(s): Carlos Ezquerra
- Editor(s): Dave Hunt

"El Mestizo" is a British comic war story published in the weekly anthology Battle Picture Weekly from 4 June to 17 September 1977 by IPC Magazines. Set during the American Civil War, the story follows a mestizo slave turned mercenary returning from Mexico to America in 1862. The story was written by Alan Hebden and drawn by Carlos Ezquerra.

== Creation ==
Since starting work on Battle Picture Weekly on the strips "Rat Pack" and "Major Eazy", Carlos Ezquerra had rapidly become one of the comic's most popular artists by 1977. He was much in demand elsewhere, working with Pat Mills and John Wagner on designing Judge Dredd for new science fiction weekly title 2000 AD. Battle editor Dave Hunt wanted to keep Ezquerra, and assigned Alan Hebden - who had worked with the artist on "Major Eazy" - to create a story, especially for the artist, coming up with "El Mestizo". As it was, Ezquerra left as regular artist on "Judge Dredd" in controversial circumstances, and would remain with Battle for another year.

As with Eazy, Hebden drew on the Clint Eastwood-starring Dollars Trilogy of films, directed by Sergio Leone, both for the mysterious lead character and the historical setting. John Freeman would later suggest that Jimi Hendrix influenced the design of the character.

== Publishing history ==
Ezquerra greatly enjoyed both the comic and working with Hebden, but was aware the strip's unconventional nature - being the first in Battle to feature a black hero and the first (and last) story in the comic set in the American Civil War, and at the time one of the few not centred on World War II - meant it was unlikely to be popular with readers. He would recall that "England in the seventies was not the right place for this character".

Their predictions proved correct as it only lasted for 16 issues before the pair were returned to "Major Eazy". Hebden would later reflect it was "too radical a story for the readership of the time", and felt Ezquerra wouldn't have left Battle to draw "Strontium Dog" in Starlord if the strip had continued for longer.

Since 2016, the rights to the story have been owned by Rebellion Developments. In 2018 they issued a hardcover collected edition of all 16 episodes under their Treasury of British Comics label, shortly before Ezquerra's death.

== Plot summary ==
A mysterious stranger appears in a Texas border town in 1862; with word of 'El Mestizo's deeds having already spread few are willing to tangle with him. He claims to be uninterested in the civil war being waged across America, instead having crossed from Mexico in pursuit of a murderer called Hutardo - though he has no reservations about taking on mercenary work for both Union and Confederate armies. He also pays a visit to the plantation in Alabama that he escaped from, visiting old friend Shelley and killing his former 'owner', only to see her mortally wounded by a group of Yankee brigands.

== Collected editions ==
Title	ISBN	Publisher	Release date	Contents
El Mestizo	9781781086575	Rebellion Developments	15 November 2018	Material from Battle 4 June to 17 September 1977

== Reception ==
In his foreword for the collected edition, Alan Hebden acknowledged the story's poor reception from Battle readers at the time but felt the strip had received a re-evaluation in the years since. David Bishop, editor of 2000 AD between 1996 and 2000, referred to the strip as "ground-breaking".

Reviewing the collected edition for Slings & Arrows, Karl Verhoven praised Ezquerra's art but expressed discomfort of the strip using a derogatory slur as its title, surmising that otherwise the story "still stands up as an imaginative adventure strip, rarely predictable beyond the certainty that the title hero will live to appear in the next episode".
