= D-Day Dawson =

British comic book story

- The cover to the 20 September 1975 edition of Battle Picture Weekly, featuring Sergeant Steve Dawson of "D-Day Dawson".
- Publisher: IPC Magazines
- Publication date: 8 March 1975 – 12 November 1977
- Genre: War
- Title(s): Battle Picture Weekly; 8 March to 22 May 1975; 14 August 1976 to 22 January 1977
- Main character(s): Steve Dawson

Creative team
- Writer(s): Gerry Finley-Day; Ron Carpenter; Alan Hebden; Robert Ede; Terry Magee; Eric Hebden
- Artist(s): Annibale Casabianca; Geoff Campion; Colin Page; Mike Western; Bill Lacey; Jim Watson
- Editor(s): Dave Hunt

"D-Day Dawson" is a British comic war story published in the weekly anthology Battle Picture Weekly from 8 March 1975 to 22 January 1977 by IPC Magazines. Set during World War II, the story follows Steve Dawson, a sergeant in the British Army left with an inoperable bullet next to his heart after being shot during the D-Day landings.

== Creation ==
Battle Picture Weekly co-creator Pat Mills worked with freelance writer Gerry Finley-Day on "D-Day Dawson" for the launch issue of the new IPC Magazines title through 1974. Finley-Day would recall the story was inspired by two principle factors - a TV series Mills remembered about a private eye living on borrowed time, and the wide coverage of the 30th anniversary of D-Day itself in the mainstream media throughout the year. The initial artist was Italian Annibale Casabianca, an employee of the Giolitti art studio.

== Publishing history ==
The story debuted as the first feature in the first issue of Battle Picture Weekly, cover-dated 8 March 1975, and was told in self-contained three-page episodes. The strip used a succession of different artists - ('Badia' of the Spanish Barden agency and British veterans such as Geoff Campion, Colin Page, Mike Western, Billy Lacey and Jim Watson) and writers (Ron Carpenter, Alan Hebden, Robert Ede, Terry Magee and Eric Hebden). The initial round of stories ended in May 1976, replaced by "Hold Hill 109" and "Rattling Rommel", before returning in August for a final six-month run that concluded the story. The final instalment was written by Eric Hebden and drawn by Jim Watson, and featured in the 99th issue of Battle. While the strip was still popular, editor Dave Hunt reluctantly concluded that the story's chronological nature and the approaching end of World War II in the serial meant "He had to die". Both runs were later reprinted in Battle, between 18 September 1982 and 22 October 1983 and 7 January to 5 May 1984, respectively.

The first episode of "D-Day Dawson" was reprinted by Egmont Publishing in a 2009 Classic Comics special edition of Battle Picture Weekly. Since 2016, the rights to the story have been owned by Rebellion Developments.

== Plot summary ==
After landing in Normandy on 6 June 1944, Sergeant Steve Dawson is shot clearing out a German machine gun nest. A doctor inspects him on a landing craft and finds a bullet is lodged next to his heart and will kill him at some point in the next year. However, before the medic can recommend he is shipped home a shell blows up the landing craft and Dawson is left as the only person aware of his condition. Unable to conscience leaving his brave but raw squad behind, Dawson vows to fight on as long as he can while fighting like a man with nothing to lose. As such he was always quick to volunteer to draw out snipers, tackle flamethrowers or plant explosives as his unit pushes to Arnhem and then on into Germany, earning a Victoria Cross along the way. As they reached the edge of Berlin, Dawson ultimately opted to die on his own terms, and walked into the sea after being assured his men could now look after themselves.

== Reception ==
Despite what he felt was a tone similar to "the 'straight bat' stories of the War Picture Library", then-Battle assistant editor Steve MacManus would recall "D-Day Dawson" rapidly became the most popular strip in the comic.

Journalist John Plunkett of The Guardian recalled the strip being "one of his favourites" from Battle Picture Weekly. However, in his foreword for reprint collection Battle Classics, comics writer Garth Ennis felt the story was a good initial concept spoilt by repetitive writing.
