= Fight for the Falklands =

British comic book story

- "Fight for the Falklands" on the cover of the 18 September 1982 edition of Battle, art by Jim Watson.
- Publisher: IPC Magazines
- Publication date: 18 September 1982 – 19 March 1983
- Genre: War
- Title(s): Battle; 18 September 1982 to 19 March 1983

Creative team
- Writer(s): John Wagner
- Artist(s): Jim Watson
- Editor(s): Terry Magee

"Fight for the Falklands" is a British comic war story published in the weekly anthology Battle from 18 September 1982 to 19 March 1983 by IPC Magazines. Written by John Wagner and drawn by Jim Watson, the strip purported to be a factual account of the then-recent Falklands War, particularly focusing on the British Task Force and Operation Corporate.

== Creation ==
The undeclared war between the United Kingdom and Argentina in April 1982 posed a problem for the editorial staff of Battle. While the British response to what was viewed as an invasion of British territory produced a boom in patriotism and interest in warfare, Battle editor Terry Magee, boys' adventure group editor Barrie Tomlinson and managing editor John Sanders ultimately agreed that 'cashing in' on the conflict would be in poor taste. As it was, the fighting concluded on 14 June 1982 and IPC swiftly planned coverage. To maintain decorum over a conflict which had seen 255 British deaths, it was decided to make a documentary-style strip simply recounting the events with no overt fictional elements. Battle co-creator and frequent contributor John Wagner was eager to write the strip, recalling he was "ready to go" and "was all for bashing the Argies" at the time. Stalwart Jim Watson drew the comic.

== Publishing history ==
"Fight for the Falklands" debuted in the 18 September 1982 edition of Battle, running for 27 weeks before ending in March 1983. Tomlinson would recall that the close proximity to the fighting drew some minor criticism, but felt "we did it in a very tactful way". Wagner noted that "war correspondents get their books out as soon as they can after getting home - they never get any stick for it". Nevertheless, it would be some four years until Battle used the Falklands War as a backdrop for a fictional story with 1987's "Invasion!", (Note: Not to be confused with the 2000 AD story of the same name.) written by Magee and again drawn by Watson. Meanwhile Battle's rival war comic, DC Thomson's Warlord printed photographs from the conflict, and ran factual pages on the military hardware involved.

Wagner would later have mixed feelings about "Fight for the Falklands", feeling he got caught up in the wave of post-victory patriotism and failed to question the British government's version of events, particularly the Belgrano sinking. Since 2016, the rights to the story have been owned by Rebellion Developments.

== Content ==
The strip retells the events of the Falklands War from a largely British perspective, with a focus on combat.

Events depicted include Operation Rosario, the attack on the ARA Santa Fe, Operation Black Buck, the sinkings of the ARA General Belgrano and HMS Sheffield, Operation Paraquet, the Battle of San Carlos, the sinking of the Atlantic Conveyor, the Battle of Goose Green, the Bluff Cove air attacks, the Battle of Two Sisters, the Battle of Mount Tumbledown and the Argentine surrender.

Prominent figures such as Leopoldo Galtieri, Rex Hunt, Keith Mills, Margaret Thatcher, Alexander Haig, Ian McDonald, Sandy Woodward, H. Jones, Ian McKay and Jeremy Moore were all featured.
