= Invasion 1984! =

British comic book story

- The 'Spooks' attacking London, from the cover of the 11 June 1983 issue of Battle. Art by Eric Bradbury.

Publication information
- Publisher: IPC Magazines
- Schedule: Weekly
- Title(s): Battle; 26 March to 31 December 1983
- Formats: Original material for the series has been published as a strip in the comics anthology(s) Battle.
- Publication date: 26 March – 31 December 1983
- Main character(s): Edward Lomax; Major McVicker; General Lapsey

Creative team
- Writer(s): John Wagner and Alan Grant (Note: Under the pseudonym 'R. Clark'.)
- Artist(s): Eric Bradbury
- Editor(s): Terry Magee

"Invasion 1984!" is a British comic strip published by IPC Magazines in the boys' comic anthology title Battle between 26 March and 31 December 1983. Written by John Wagner and Alan Grant, and drawn by Eric Bradbury, the story depicts an alien invasion of a very near future Earth by advanced, brutal aliens referred to only as 'Spooks'.

== Creation ==
Battle had been launched by IPC in 1975 in response to DC Thomson's Warlord, with both focusing on war stories with some connection to real conflicts past and present. While initially both were highly successful, by 1982, sales had begun to fall. In response, Battle enlarged its scope with the likes of martial arts story "The Fists of Jimmy Chiang" and trucking strip "Truck Turpin". The magazine also tried hybrid war stories, and "Invasion 1984!" was commissioned based on the ongoing success of the science fiction genre in culture in general and 2000 AD in particular. The strip was devised by John Wagner and Alan Grant, already established as two of 2000 AD's major contributors; their IPC output by this point was so prolific that managing editor John Sanders insist they use a pseudonym for the title, which was credited to 'R. Clark'. Veteran Eric Bradbury, who had been working for the company in its various guises for more than three decades, was selected for art duties.

== Publishing history ==
The serial was printed in Battle between 26 March and 31 December 1983, effectively ended to make space for the increasing amount of the comic taken up by the Palitoy-backed "Action Force" licensed strips.

Having purchased the rights to IPC's post-1 January 1970 catalogue in 2016, Rebellion Developments issued the complete story in a trade paperback under their Treasury of British Comics imprint in May 2019.

== Plot summary ==
A fleet of a thousand UFOs enters Earth's Solar System on 21 March 1984. While no communication has been made, Earth is hopeful of a friendly first contact and Space Shuttle Columbia is sent into orbit to greet the aliens – only to be shot down on live television as it approaches. Panic sets in all around the world at the show of hostility. The ships begin heading toward the major cities of the world, and the RAF scramble to meet those heading for London. They find the invaders ships are heavily shielded, and the planes are wiped out by return fire before the aliens start landing, attacking those on the ground indiscriminately. While their foot soldiers are unshielded, the British Army is only able to give sporadic resistance due to the air supremacy enjoyed by the aliens' spike-covered scout ships.

Among the few still alive in London is linguist Ed Lomax, along with his wife Marie and son Mike. Unknown to them they are being sought by Storm Squad, a British special ops unit of questionable characters activated due to the crisis. They are able to make radio contact with Lomax and arrange an extraction, but their helicopter is shot down. Led by the uncompromising Major "Mad Mike" McVicker, Storm Squad fight their way into London and back out with the Lomax family, taking them to a secure bunker in Bedfordshire under the command of General Lapsey and the Minister of Defence. Parliament is soon destroyed, and even the launch of a Trident missile at Glasgow fails to pierce the alien shields. Lomax has been recruited to decipher the language used by the aliens – who are nicknamed 'Spooks' by Storm Squad, a name which soon sticks – so it can be worked out what exactly they want. Meanwhile, around the world, the pattern is the same, as the aliens systematically annihilate Earth's military forces and major population centres.

As little footage of the aliens has survived, Lomax requests live subjects for study – a task Storm Squad are only too happy to undertake. The sweep reveals that society has effectively broken down and little resistance to the aliens remains. The Spooks have started rounding up civilians, fitting able-bodied adults with cybernetic control boxes that irreversibly turn them into mindless zombies and killing any who resist. Despite losses, Storm Squad are able to return to the bunker undetected with a trio of captured Spooks. Lomax believes it will take him two months to decode their language, but the Minister of Defence tells him it will only be a week before humanity is doomed. Using a decoder headset created by Lomax, the Minister allows himself to be captured so he can request peace, but is decapitated. The aliens release a deadly pathogen to flush out the remnants of resistance, and many in the base become infected as it is spread from one of Storm Squad. Lomax meanwhile is able to find that the aliens come from a planet near the constellation of Cygnus where their sun is nearing supernova, but falls ill soon afterwards. McVicker and his men find an antidote after realising the Spooks must be using something to make themselves immune and are able to cure most in the bunker.

The mission gives McVicker the idea of using an Earth disease against the invaders; while they are clearly immune to most diseases he suggests retrieving Culture Ex-Seventeen from the Bacterial Warfare facility at Geddon Down, inoculating themselves. While some baulk at the idea, it is eventually decided that there are few other alternatives. Storm Squad take Lapsey, Lomax and former Geddon Down worker Doctor Martin Bennett on the sortie to retrieve Ex-Seventeen, using a captured spy craft piloted by a veteran RAF Squadron Leader 'Tommo' Frame. Despite further losses – including both the General and Squadron Leader sacrificing themselves to allow the rest of the group to escape – and a slow, perilous journey back to the bunker, the survivors are able to release the bacteria, realising that they will be wiping out much of the remainder of humanity along with the invaders. Ex-Seventeen rapidly kills the Spooks already on Earth, causing the second wave of alien ships to turn back. A week later, the Lomax family emerge and begin planning to search for other survivors and rebuild Earth.

== Collected editions ==
Title	ISBN	Publisher	Release date	Contents
Invasion 1984!	9781781086759	Rebellion Developments	2 May 2019	Material from Battle 26 March to 31 December 1983

== Reception ==
Wagner has since expressed embarrassment over the story, calling it "terrible" and feeling they should have done a better job with the concept. Despite his dislike of the story, "Invasion 1984!" has received positive, if qualified, reviews.

Andrew Darlington noted the Storm Squad's similarities to earlier Battle unit Rat Pack and the story's similarity to 2000 AD story "Invasion!", but overall felt the story worked "remarkably well". Reviewing the collected edition for Broken Frontier, Andy Oliver also signposted the premise's lack of originality but enjoyed both the nihilism and the art, feeling "while it starts slowly this tale of extraterrestrial terror slowly evolves into a solemn sermon on the devastating consequences of war". Despite having no memory of it when originally reading Battle in 1983, Lew Stringer also praised the story, noting it was a "bloody good yarn that's fast-paced and full of action", and noting his surprise that the high level of violence passed at the time compared to the controversy generated a few years earlier by the infamous Action.

Starburst also gave the book a highly positive review, surmising that "Invasion 1984! is terrific entertainment, breathlessly page-turning and possibly even more harrowing and affecting in the rather more anodyne 21st century than it would have been for its wide-eyed 1980s audience", though noting the hurried ending. Doris V. Sutherland covered the story for WomenWriteAboutComics, and appreciated the potentially silly storyline being told with "a straight face", citing it as an example that 2000 AD "did not have a monopoly on bombastic sci-fi pulp" at the time; however, she also noted the abrupt change of direction in the conclusion. Frank Plowright also praised the choice of the story for the Treasury of British Comics line, stating Invasion 1984! remained "a cracking formula adventure that maintains its suspense to the end".
