= The Bootneck Boy =

British comic book story

- The cover to the 10 April 1976 edition of Battle Picture Weekly, featuring Danny Budd of "The Bootneck Boy".
- Publisher: IPC Magazines
- Publication date: 8 March 1975 – 12 November 1977
- Genre: War
- Title(s): Battle Picture Weekly; 8 March 1975 to 12 November 1977
- Main character(s): Danny Budd

Creative team
- Writer(s): Ian McDonald; Gerry Finley-Day; John Wagner
- Artist(s): Juan Giralt
- Editor(s): Dave Hunt

"The Bootneck Boy" is a British comic war story published in the weekly anthology Battle Picture Weekly from 8 March 1975 to 12 November 1977 by IPC Magazines. Set during World War II, the story follows Danny Budd, a youth from the fictional Northern England town of Tynecastle as he strives to join the Royal Marines.

== Creation ==
Having been hired by IPC Magazines to create the new anthology Battle Picture Weekly in 1974, freelancer writers Pat Mills and John Wagner both had mixed feelings about writing a war comic, and as a result tried to take a more realistic approach with working class heroes as protagonists. They recruited fellow freelancer Gerry Finley-Day, having had good experiences working with him on IPC's line of girls' comics. Battle assistant editor Steve MacManus recalled Finley-Day being an important sounding board for Mills and Wagner. All three had worked for rival DC Thomson, and Finley-Day took inspiration from Alf Tupper, the working class athlete who starred in sports strip "The Tough of the Track" in the Scottish company's long-running Victor. Finley-Day would work with Ian McDonald on the story, while Spaniard Juan Giralt handled art duties.

== Publishing history ==
The first episode of "The Bootneck Boy" appeared in the debut issue of Battle Picture Weekly, dated 8 March 1975. McDonald wrote the first two weekly episodes before Finley-Day took over as writer for two weeks before the next two episodes were written by Wagner, after which Finley-Day returned and remained on the strip until it finished. He would later name "The Bootneck Boy" as his favourite strip to work on for Battle.

The story was popular with Battle readers, and would run until the 12 November 1977 edition, when it finally made way to accommodate incoming stories from the comic's merger with Action.

"The Bootneck Boy"'s first episode was reprinted by Egmont Publishing in a 2009 Classic Comics special edition of Battle Picture Weekly. Since 2016, the rights to the story have been owned by Rebellion Developments.

== Plot summary ==
Danny Budd is rejected by the Royal Marines due to his lack of height. An orphan, he lives with his sneering Uncle Fred and oafish cousin Ron in Northern town Tynecastle. Danny works as an underappreciated role as assistant to Fred's coal delivery business, and longs to be a Bootneck like his late father. After being spotted in a scuffle by a Marines recruiting officer, Danny is signed up. While his small stature makes him the butt of jokes his determination and courage soon shine through, especially when defending the barracks from a Luftwaffe raid.

Despite further clashes with Fred, Ron and a brash company of Rangers deployed to the town he successfully completes training, and is deployed to the 1942 landings in North Africa. Danny is later selected for SBS missions in the Aegean Sea and fighting along partisans on Crete and in raids in Yugoslavia. Later his unit were selected to work with Soviet marines in the Black Sea, fighting in the Crimea over the winter of 1943. In 1944 he was assigned to special unit Striker Force for the Anzio landings; Danny was injured during the battle and sent on leave in Britain, ending up foiling an escape by German prisoners-of-war. He was later assigned to the Normandy landings force, coming ashore at Juno Beach. Danny fought in the Liberation of Paris and the push to Antwerp. Later in the year he was seconded to the United States Marine Corps, where he made fast friends with Moose Malloy, before being seriously injured fighting the Japanese in Burma in January 1945. After VJ Day, Danny and Moose set up a boxing gym in New York.

== Reception ==
The Guardian humorously compared Budd's difficulties in making the grade as a Royal Maine with those of Prince Edward, while Graham Kibble-White likened the story to kitchen sink realism.
