= Charley's War =

British comic strip

- Author(s): Pat Mills (script) (1979–1985); Scott Goodall (script) (1985–1986); Joe Colquhoun (art)
- Current status/schedule: Concluded
- Launch date: 6 January 1979
- End date: 4 October 1986
- Publisher: IPC Publications
- Genre: Action / War

Charley's War was a British comic strip set in World War I, written by Pat Mills and drawn by Joe Colquhoun.

It was originally published in Battle Picture Weekly from January 1979 to October 1986.

Though later parts of the story covered the Russian Civil War (and, in episodes written by Scott Goodall, the early part of World War II), Pat Mills has stated that Charley's story should end at the end of the First World War, and this has been reflected in the collections published by Titan Comics.

== Publishing history ==
Described by Andrew Harrison as "the greatest British comic strip ever created", Charley's War tells the story of an underage British soldier called Charley Bourne. Charley joins the British Army during World War I at the age of 16, having lied about his age and told the recruiting officers that he was 18 (they conveniently overlook the fact that Charley gives his date of birth on his application form as 1900), and is quickly thrust into the Battle of the Somme.

The strip follows Charley's life in the trenches and his experiences during the war. Colquhoun put a meticulous level of research into the already well-researched scripts which Mills provided. The strip rarely flinched from providing an extremely frank portrayal of the horrors of war, so much so that in some later reprintings some of the artwork was censored. Mills added a political slant in the strip not seen in British war comics and avoided the standard heroics common in war comics generally.

In addition to depicting Charley's own experiences of the war, the comic took the risk of going off on several tangents, temporarily shifting the focus to characters in different locations and time periods. The first and most successful tangent was the story of 'Blue', a British soldier in the French Foreign Legion who fought with them at Verdun in 1916 before deserting and making his way back to England (where he meets Charley). Another diversion was when the storyline turned to Charley's younger brother Wilf and his experiences as an observer/gunner in the Royal Flying Corps in early 1918. The final and least successful tangent was the story of Charley's cousin Jack Bourne, a sailor in the Royal Navy and the story of his ship HMS Kent and its participation in the Battle of the Falklands in 1914. Unlike the previous diversions, this new change of setting received poor feedback from readers and the editor of Battle ordered Mills to return the storyline to Charley in the trenches, much to Mills' disappointment who had originally planned to continue Jack's story on into the Battle of Jutland in 1916.

The strip followed Charley through to the end of the war and through into the invasion of Russia in 1919. However, in January 1985, Mills quit the strip before being able to complete the story (he intended the story to end in 1933, with Charley on the dole as Hitler is made Chancellor of Germany) due to a dispute over his research budget.

Mills was replaced by Scott Goodall and the story was moved to World War II and became a more conventional war adventure strip. However, the series ended in the early part of the Second World War after Charley is one of the lucky ones successfully evacuated from Dunkirk (along with his son), realising he is too old for soldiering any more. The story ends with him wondering how he came to become a soldier in the first place, leading into a re-run of the strip within Battle Picture Weekly until that comic folded.

In reality, the ending of Charley's War was down to the poor health of Joe Colquhoun, which had already caused the strip to be delayed several weeks. Out of respect for Joe, there was no question of getting another artist to take over production, and it was felt best to simply draw it to a close.

In 1988, Battle was folded into Eagle, which also began reprinting Charley's War, which became one of the mainstays of the title. By 1990, the storyline had reached 1917 and Charley's time as a stretcher bearer, but with the comic about to be revamped and most of the strips about to be dropped, the title skipped ahead to the conclusion of the First World War and the end of Charley's conflict with Captain Snell in order to give it some conclusion.

Episodes of Charley's War were reprinted in the Judge Dredd Megazine (#211–244, in 2003–2006). The First World War episodes were collected in ten graphic novels by Titan Books between 2004 and 2013. Rebellion's Treasury of British Comics imprint began a new series of graphic novels in 2018.

Charley's War was featured in "Boys and Girls", the second programme of Comics Britannia on BBC Four.

Charley's War was the subject of a display dispersed around the Musée de la Grande Guerre du Pays de Meaux in France (from 16 October 2014 to 4 January 2015).

== Plot ==
- June–December 1916. Sixteen-year-old Charley Bourne from East End of London enlists in the British Army. He arrives on the Western Front in France shortly before the beginning of the Battle of the Somme. His platoon is commanded by Lt Thomas and Sgt 'Ole Bill' Tozer and private Ginger Jones becomes Charley's best mate. Participates in the opening day of the Somme on 1 July. The platoon suffers heavy losses. Charley witnesses the last British Cavalry charge and takes part in the combat debut of the new Tanks. Guilt-strickened veteran Lonely sacrifices himself to expose the location of a German ambush. Lt Thomas saves the platoon by withdrawing without orders and he is arrested and executed for cowardice. Charley and Weeper Watkins endure harsh field punishment for refusing to join Thomas' firing squad. Ginger is killed by a random shell. Oiley Oliver arrives but does not last long, escaping via a self-inflicted injury. The German 'Judgement Troopers' led by the ruthless Colonel Zeiss stage a counter-attack, penetrating deep into the British lines and nearly wiping out Charley's platoon but their success is halted by the German high command's refusal to give Zeiss reinforcements. Charley is wounded by a stray shell.
- January–March 1917. Charley recuperates in hospital and has a spell of leave in London. Discovers Oiley's criminal activities. Charley rescues his mother from a munitions factory during a Zeppelin raid. Encounters deserter Blue and aids his escape after the latter tells him of his experiences with the French Foreign Legion at the Battle of Verdun.
- April–May 1917. Charley returns to the Western Front where Cpt Snell (who he encountered as a lieutenant during the Somme) is now his commander. Snell is a ruthless leader who does not care about the welfare of his men. Charley becomes Snell's batman for a short period. A burly veteran Grogan bullies a bookwormish newcomer Scholar and other conscripts. Charley intervenes and he and Grogan eventually fight but the latter is accidentally killed when a discarded shell he picked up to throw at Charley turns out to be live and explodes in his hand. Weeper is wounded and later deserts. During a march to the rear in fierce heat, Sgt Tozer passes out with exhaustion and Snell demotes him to private.
- June–July 1917. Snell volunteers the platoon to become miners to plant underground explosives under the German trenches. One of the men, Budgie, is a conscientious objector and Charley defends him from abuse by others. Charley and several of his comrades narrowly survive a cave-in and they break into and destroy a German tunnel. An increasingly pompous Scholar wrangles a transfer away to officer training and Charley begins to regret having helped him. The huge mine that the platoon has set beneath the German lines fails to detonate and an enraged Snell accuses Budgie of sabotage and shoots him dead. Charley follows Snell into the tunnels, intending to kill the latter but another soldier with the same plan gets there before him. In the shootout that follows, Snell is struck in the head by a ricochet and sent away in a coma.
- August–September 1917. Charley's unit takes part in the Battle of Third Ypres. Charley finds and rescues his wounded brother Wilf who has joined up under-age by assuming the identity of a deserter (in a scheme arranged by Oiley). The unit is sent to the training camp at Etaples to prepare for the next great offensive. The harsh and cruelly strict conditions enrage the veteran, war-weary soldiers, eventually igniting the Etaples Mutiny. Charley encounters Blue who is posing as a British officer whilst smuggling food to his gang of deserters hiding in nearby woods. Tozer is remade a Sergeant. Weeper who had been arrested for desertion is freed during the mutiny but is killed whilst saving Charley from a knife attack by another deserter. The mutiny is a success, improving conditions at the camp but Charley is then returned to the trenches.
- October–December 1917. The muddy hell of Passchendaele. Sickened by the slaughter, Charley volunteers to be a stretcher-bearer, a duty he performs bravely but he is falsely accused of looting the dead and sacked. A massive British tank attack breaks the German line at Cambrai but the offensive is halted due to in-decision by the British commanders. Scholar returns from officer training. Charley is detailed to become a sniper and the platoon occupies a sector opposite the unit of Corporal Adolf Hitler. Charley and Hitler fight hand-to-hand during a trench raid, nearly killing each other. The two sides enjoy a Christmas truce but Hitler stays in his dugout, refusing to take part.
- January–February 1918. Wilf has transferred to the RFC and is now an observer/gunner in a Bristol F2B squadron. He shoots down several German planes but narrowly avoids death when he is shot down and his pilot Captain Morgan is killed. Back in the trenches, Charley accidentally shoots himself in the foot and is accused of cowardice by the Scholar. Whilst in hospital he meets a nurse Kate and after a frosty start, the former realises Charley is no coward and the two begin a romantic relationship. A written statement from a dying officer saves Charley from a conviction and he and Kate go on leave in London. Snell, rendered psychotic by his head wound, attempts to murder Charley and Kate.
- March–June 1918. Charley marries Kate. Whilst on their honeymoon, they receive the news that Wilf is dead, having been shot down after bringing down a German Zeppelin heavy bomber over London. Charley's cousin Jack, a sailor in the Royal Navy, tells of his experiences at the Battle of the Falklands in 1914. Charley, now a Lance-Corporal, returns to the Front, just in time for the massive and sudden German spring offensive. The German Stormtroopers attack Charley's sector and Scholar is set ablaze by a flame-thrower. Charley cannot bring himself to put the dying Scholar out of his agony but the deed is performed by newcomer Skin. Charley rallies a rag-tag group of stragglers and looters to mount a last-ditch defence of the town of Albert. Skin is seen talking to a German soldier who is revealed to be his brother but not before the latter is fatally shot by another Briton. During a battle against the new German tanks, Charley meets Snell, who has managed to secure a transfer back to the fighting, despite being virtually insane. Charley is promoted to full Corporal. Snell murders an African-American Doughboy named 'Pig-Iron' that Charley has befriended and then later kills a British officer who witnessed the earlier crime.
- July–November 1918. After a battle against German commandoes, Charley is captured and sent to a POW camp where he meets his cousin Jack. After three attempts, the pair escape and Charley rejoins his unit. The platoon advances towards Germany during the final weeks of the war, taking part in the crossing of the St. Quentin Canal. Skin is shot dead by Snell after the former protests at the latter's execution of German prisoners. On 11 November, the final day of the war, Snell is determined to have the symbolic honour of reaching Mons, pointlessly expending his men's lives. After the platoon is wiped out only minutes before the 11am ceasefire, Snell and Charley have a final showdown. Snell is about to kill Charley but the former is drenched by an acid-sprayer wielded by a surviving German. Ignoring Snell's pleas to be put of his misery, Charley walks away leaving his nemesis to die slowly. Snell's final action had been to 'volunteer' Charley to join the British Expeditionary Force to the Russian Civil War.
- January–October 1919. Charley and Bill Tozer head to Russia where they fight alongside the 'Whites' – pro-Monarchist Russians – against the Bolshevik Reds who are defending their Revolution, with Tozer serving as company sergeant major. Charley soon becomes disillusioned at the incompetence and cowardice amongst the Whites, some of whom change sides and join the Reds. Charley prevents rogue Bolshevik Colonel Spirodonov from capturing a White armoured train loaded with refugees and royal gold.
- 1933. The Great Depression and Charley is on the dole. News arrives that Adolf Hitler has seized power in Germany. At this point, writer Pat Mills ceased work on the comic and was replaced by Scott Goodall.
- September 1939 – June 1940. Charley reluctantly enlists in the British Army again after learning his son Len has joined up. Joins the BEF in France and participates in the heavy fighting against the German Blitzkrieg and in the long and confused retreat to Dunkirk. Back in England, Ole Bill has joined the Home Guard. Charley's wife Kate is falsely arrested for black-marketeering as, unbeknown to her, Oiley has been stashing stolen goods in her home. Oiley tries to have Bill murdered but the attempt fails and Bill beats Oiley into confessing, freeing Kate from prison. Back in France, Charley finds his shell-shocked son Len at Dunkirk and they escape back to Britain together. Charley decides he has had enough of war.

== Major characters ==
Charley Bourne

The central character and hero of the series. A working-class London lad from a close-knit family, he enlists in the British Army in 1916, age sixteen and arrives in the trenches on the Western Front shortly before the start of the Somme Campaign. Naive and not too bright, Bourne nonetheless gets much hard-earned worldly wisdom as he experiences and survives the horrors of the Great War for the next three years and beyond. Exceptionally brave, loyal to his comrades and quick to defend those who are suffering bullying or injustice, Bourne makes friends and enemies in equal numbers. His fundamental decency and conscientious sense of duty are sometimes at odds with his anger at the many injustices of military life and his growing disillusionment over the conduct of the war.

Sergeant 'Ole Bill' Tozer

The veteran Platoon-Sgt, Ole Bill is one of the very few who makes it all the way through the war with Bourne, more or less in one piece. An old pre-war Regular soldier, he was one of the BEF's 'Old Contemptibles' who fought at Mons in August 1914. Burly, loud, fond of a drink and seemingly indestructible, Bill has a roaring voice and courage that help Charley and his fellows out of trouble time and time again.

Ginger Jones

Charley's best pal on the Somme in 1916. Never a natural-born soldier and always the first to complain, Ginger makes up for his lack of enthusiasm with his sense of humour and cunning. Despite himself, he survives numerous tight-spots alongside Charley in 1916.

Lieutenant Thomas

Charley's first platoon commander and easily the best officer he serves under during the war. Public-schooled but enlightened, brave but never blood-thirsty, Thomas is a decent man who represents the best of his class.

Lieutenant (later Captain) D'Arcy Snell

A vicious, pompous and war-loving officer, Snell treats the war as a marvellous sport and his men as expendable examples of the lower classes who must be kept in their place. Snell becomes Charley's platoon commander after the death of Thomas and he remains Charley's ultimate nemesis.

Lonely

A traumatised veteran who was the sole survivor of his platoon when it was wiped out in 1915 due to a recklessly cruel act by Lt Snell. Wracked by guilt, he confides in Charley the truth of what happened.

Blue

A British deserter from the French Foreign Legion, Blue fled to England after surviving the hellish Battle of Verdun in 1916 in which most of his fellow Legionaries were slaughtered. Charley reluctantly helps Blue to avoid capture whilst in Britain and later encounters him again during the infamous Etaples Mutiny in 1917. Despite his misgivings over Blue's desertion, Charley cannot help but feel a kinship with him due to their common resentment of the military hierarchy and Charley's realisation that, with less fortunate circumstances, he could have easily ended up the same way.

Weeper Watkins

Injured by poison gas that left his tear-ducts constantly running, Weeper is a cheeky rebel who hates the war and despises the army and he suffers badly for his insubordination. He eventually deserts but is recaptured in 1917.

Ernie Stubbs

A short soldier who is one of the officers' servants during Charley's time as Snell's batman. He once served in the Bantams until his regiments was disbanded because of heavy casualties. Captured during a raid on the trench, he is killed by Adolf Hitler with a grenade when he tries to escape.

The Scholar

Joining Charley's platoon as a young private after the Somme, the Scholar, a gentle and timid book-worm, is bullied viciously by a burly veteran named Grogan. Charley steps in to help, leading to a fight in which Grogan is accidentally killed. The Scholar soon turns out to be a two-faced cunning snob who wrangles a transfer to officer training and he later returns as the platoon commander who thinly conceals his fear behind his pomposity and petty resentment of Charley.

Earwig

A one-time crony of Grogan's and the regiment's barber. He holds a grudge against Charley for his role in Grogan's death and they often clash. He dies at the Third Battle of Ypres, after taking shelter in a shell hole full of mustard gas.

Budgie

A conscientious objector who has been forced into the army through torture and intimidation and works as a miner alongside Charley in 1917 employed to lay explosive mines beneath the German lines. Budgie has sworn never to kill a fellow human being.

Sadders

A terminally pessimistic soldier with a morbid fear of being gassed. He becomes one of Charley's regular companions during Etaples and Passchendaele. He is later killed by a sniper.

Wilfred Bourne

Charley's younger brother, 'Wilf' enters the army under-age by assuming the identity of a deserter. Injured on the Western Front in 1917, Wilf transfers to the Royal Flying Corps and serves as an observer/gunner in a two-seater Bristol squadron.

Captain Morgan

Wilf's pilot and commander whose previous three observers have all been killed. Morgan is a tough, hard-bitten pilot who has no tolerance for shirkers nor for the chivalrous pretensions of his fellow officers.

Jack Bourne

Charley's cousin and a sailor in the Royal Navy who fought at the Battle of the Falklands in 1914. He and Charley meet each other in a German POW camp in 1918.

Oiley Oliver

Charley's brother-in-law, he arrives at the front as a private during the Somme Campaign and soon proves to be a snivelling coward. Escaping from the war with a self-inflicted injury, he returns to London to become a con-man, black marketeer and stand-over merchant.

Smith 70 and Young Albert

Smith is the eccentric and cheerful machine-gunner who regards his work as both a science and an art-form and Albert is his injury-prone but uncomplaining loader.

Dr No

British Army doctor who treats wounded troops at a forward aid station. Known for his cold and callous attitudes towards the suffering of injured soldiers, refusing to allow even badly injured men to be sent to the rear, often dispensing the dreaded 'Number 9' pill, a strong laxative intended to 'cure' all ailments. Charley initially despises him but he later learns of the horrific conditions and immense pressures that the exhausted doctor works under.

Kate

A young nurse who lost her fiancé at Gallipoli in 1915 and who tends to Charley when he is hospitalised in early 1918 with an accidental self-inflicted wound. After a tense beginning, the relationship blossoms into romance and the pair eventually marry and after the war have a son, Len.

Skin Skorczyk

British soldier whose parents were born in German-ruled Silesia and whose brother is in the German army.

Corporal Pig-Iron

An African-American Doughboy of the 'Harlem's Hell-fighters'.

Colonel Ziess

Tough, brave and ruthless German officer who commands the veteran 'Judgement Troopers' and launches a deadly counter-attack on the Somme against the sector where Charley's platoon is located. Having risen from humble origins, Ziess despises his more aristocratic peers and instead believes in the modern ideas of war – 'total' war to be waged without mercy.

Corporal Adolf Hitler

In December 1917, Charley's unit is located in the sector opposite the regiment of the young Hitler who appears here as a short-tempered, idealistic, selfishly brave and somewhat pompous soldier who is tolerated, rather than liked, by his comrades.

Unteroffizier 'Guts' Guttenheim

Sadistic German officer who runs the POW camp that Charley and Jack are confined in during the summer of 1918.

Warrior

A British army horse that Charley, who grew up working with horses, saves the life of in 1916 and encounters several times during the rest of the war, the two sharing a certain bond.

Colonel Spirodonov

Bolshevik officer in the Russian Civil War. A former soldier in the Czar's army, he suffered brutally in a penal battalion forced to build the so-called 'Death Railway' in Murmansk. Knowing the railway was commissioned and paid for by the British government, he has vowed revenge on all Englishmen.

Len Bourne

Charley and Kate's son, who after a row with his parents joins the British Army. At one point Charley believes Len to have been killed only for them to reunite outside Dunkirk, although Len has severe shell shock and nearly causes the death of his father.

Joe 'Wattsie' Watts

A former jockey and member of Charley's section in France, 1940. Wattsie and Charley become best friends and manage to escape to the Dunkirk perimeter before Wattsie is seriously wounded.

Sergeant Bert 'Ol Nick' Nickles

Charley's Platoon Sergeant in the B.E.F. and nemesis. Nickles, who is vicious and nasty, resents Charley's experience from the Great War. 'Ol Nick becomes more and more sadistic until he meets his match in Major Klaus Rimmer, also known as Atilla the Hun.

Archie Bentall and Cyril 'Handy' Hordle

Cut off from their unit like Charley and Wattsie, they join up and escape the attacking German Army in a Bren Carrier they find in a barn. The four have various adventures during the retreat from Belgium until Wattsie is crippled by Panzer fire, and later Handy is killed and Charley wounded by German sniper Heinrich Horst.

== Collected editions ==
Titan Books released the bulk of Pat Mills' run of Charley's War in 112-page hardcover anthologies.

Ten collections were published between 2004 and 2013. These collected editions finish at the end of the First World War. They do not contain the later Charley's War comics, not written by Pat Mills, where Charley takes part in the Second World War.

- Charley's War:
  - 2 June – 1 August 1916 (collects episodes 1–29, November 2004, ISBN 1-84023-627-2)
  - 1 August – 17 October 1916 (collects episodes 30–59, November 2005, ISBN 1-84023-929-8)
  - 17 October 1916 – 21 February 1917 (collects episodes 60–83, October 2006, ISBN 1-84576-270-3)
  - Blue's Story (October 2007, ISBN 1-84576-323-8)
  - Return to the Front (October 2008, ISBN 1-84576-796-9)
  - Underground and Over the Top (October 2009, ISBN 1-84576-797-7)
  - The Great Mutiny (November 2010, ISBN 1-84856-741-3)
  - Hitler's Youth (October 2011, ISBN 0-85768-299-7)
  - Death from Above (October 2012, ISBN 0-85768-300-4)
  - The End (October 2013, ISBN 0-85768-301-2)

An omnibus edition of the first three volumes was published in paperback by Titan in 2014:

- Charley's War: A Boy Soldier in the Great War (Collects episodes 1-87, August 2014, ISBN 1-78116-914-4) – an omnibus edition containing the strips from the first three volumes above plus the first few strips from volume IV. This volume was reprinted in November 2014 as Charley's War: A Working Man's Journey into War.

In 2018 Rebellion began another series of Charley's War reprints in its Treasury of British Comics imprint. These paperback volumes included colour spreads from the comic for the first time in an English printing since it ran in Battle. Called The Definitive Collection it collected the Great War strip in three volumes:

- The Boy Soldier (April 2018, ISBN 978-1781086193)
- Brothers in Arms (May 2018, ISBN 978-1781086209)
- Remembrance (June 2018, ISBN 978-1781086216)

== Awards ==
- 2006: Nominated for "Favourite Reprint Compilation" Eagle Award
