= Rat Pack (comics) =

British comic book story

- Rat Pack on the cover of the 1 December 1979 edition of Battle Picture Weekly, art by Carlos Ezquerra.
- Publisher: IPC Magazines
- Publication date: 8 March 1975 – 8 July 1978
- Genre: War
- Title(s): Battle; 8 March 1975 to 3 January 1976; 3 April to 7 August 1976; 29 January to 8 July 1978; 18 September 1979 to 7 June 1980
- Main character(s): Major Taggart; Matthew Dancer; Kabuk 'The Turk' Hasan; Ian 'Scarface' Rogan; Ronald Weasel

Creative team
- Writer(s): Terry Magee; Eric Hebden; Gerry Finley-Day; Peter Harris; S. Conforth; Ken Mennell; R. Marsh; Alan Hebden; Brian Bullen
- Artist(s): Carlos Ezquerra; Alan Philpott; Ken Houghton; Colin Page; Massimo Belardinelli; Johnny Johnson; Eduardo Feito; Bill Lacey; Vanyo; John Cooper; Eric Bradbury
- Editor: Dave Hunt

"Rat Pack" is a British comic war story published in the weekly anthology Battle Picture Weekly from 8 March 1975 to 8 July 1978 by IPC Magazines. Set during World War II, the story follows the eponymous unit, a penal military unit of four criminals recruited by British Army officer Major Taggart to undertake deadly missions.

== Creation ==
After Pat Mills and John Wagner were charged with creating Battle Picture Weekly for IPC Magazines. Gerry Finley-Day was one of the writers they turned to after positive experiences working with him on girls' comics, particularly Tammy. Finley-Day was later be honest that the concept "was simply a rip-off of" war film The Dirty Dozen. The editorial team originally wanted Carlos Ezquerra to draw the strip after spotting his work in DC Thomson titles. After some difficulty locating the uncredited artist via his agent, Ezquerra agreed to work on the strip, but only around his extant DC Thomson work until he could be sure Battle Picture Weekly was a success.

== Publishing history ==
As a result of Ezquerra's commitments numerous artists filled in on the strip, including Massimo Belardinelli, while the format of standalone six-page stories saw several writers rotate on the strip. It nevertheless a hit with readers. "Rat Pack" appeared in the first issue of Battle in March 1975 and initially ran until January 1976, but would return periodically due to reader demand. Alan Hebden would eventually become the main writer. He remembered he felt there were too many characters, and frequently pitched killing off Rogan as he "was the deserter and nobody ever liked that".

From 29 January 1977 the strip featured a crossover with Major Eazy (who took command of the Pack after they abandoned Taggart and were then forced to rescue him by new commanding officer Eazy), and was renamed as "Major Eazy versus Rat Pack" in reference to the antagonistic relationship between the characters; it was the first crossover between characters in Battle Picture Weekly - something which was rarely done in British anthologies at the time. Battle editor Dave Hunt would later admit the story was created as a solution to keep both popular characters in the comic while making room for new stories such as "Johnny Red". Ezquerra drew the strip but would later note he enjoyed Major Eazy's solo adventures more; like Hedben, he felt there were too many characters in "Rat Pack". After a year out of the comic, the team returned for a final time after Terry Magee took over as Battle editor, this time as a serial until June 1980.

An episode of "Rat Pack" was reprinted by Egmont Publishing in a 2009 Classic Comics special edition of Battle Picture Weekly. The following year Titan Comics collected the first group of stories in the hardback Rat Pack: Guns, Guts & Glory (Volume 1); despite the name, no further volumes followed.

Since 2016, the rights to the story have been owned by Rebellion Developments. Two years later in August 2018, they issued a new 3-part comic series Sniper Elite: Resistance by Keith Richardson and Patrick Goddard, a spin-off from the PlayStation 4 game Sniper Elite. The story, set in German-occupied France in 1941, included an appearance by the Rat Pack. In 2020 Rebellion issued a collected edition of "Major Eazy vs. Rat Pack" as part of their Treasury of British Comics range, while Garth Ennis would write a new story for the same year's Battle Action Special one-shot.

== Plot summary ==
Four inmates imprisoned in Wessex Military Prison's maximum security wing in 1941 - Kabul 'the Turk' Hasan (a Cypriot who attacked a superior officer), Ronald Weasel (a safecracker who attempted to rob a Paymaster's Office, Ian 'Scarface' Rogan (a deserter from the Highland Infantry) and Matthew Dancer (a Commando caught looting) find their cells unlocked and escape.

They find out they have been sprung by Major Taggart, who plans to turn them into a crack special operations team in return for being released from prison. Despite the four convicts hating each other almost as much as they hate Taggart and various attempts to murder, abandonment and exploitation the 'Rat Pack' carry out numerous successful missions behind enemy lines.

== Collected editions ==
Title	ISBN	Publisher	Release date	Contents
Rat Pack: Guns, Guts & Glory (Volume 1)	1848560354	Titan Books	September 2010	Material from Battle 8 March 1975 to 7 August 1976
Major Eazy vs. Rat Pack	9781781088555	Rebellion Developments	30 September 2020	Material from Battle 29 January to 23 April 1977
Rat Pack: Convict Commandos	9781837865376	Rebellion Developments	27 August 2020	Originally serialised in Battle 29 October 1979 to 7 June 1980
