= Darkie's Mob =

British comic book story

- The cover to the 19 March 1977 edition of Battle Picture Weekly featuring "Darkie's Mob", art by Mike Western.
- Publisher: IPC Magazines
- Publication date: 14 August 1976 – 18 June 1977
- Genre: War
- Title(s): Battle Picture Weekly; 14 August 1976 to 18 June 1977
- Main character(s): Joe Darkie; Lieutenant Meeker; Sergeant Samson; Private 'Shorty' Shortland; Private Johnson; Private Smiley; Private Roper 'Flyboy' Ferris

Creative team
- Writer: John Wagner
- Artist: Mike Western
- Editor: Dave Hunt

"Darkie's Mob" is a British comic war story published in the weekly anthology Battle Picture Weekly from 14 August 1976 to 18 June 1977 by IPC Magazines. Set during World War II, the story follows a rogue unit led by the uncompromising Joe Darkie, operating in Burma behind Japanese lines. Written by John Wagner and drawn by Mike Western, the strip was told through a bloodstained notebook recovered from the Burmese jungle in 1946.

== Creation ==
John Wagner had worked with Pat Mills on the original launch of Battle Picture Weekly in 1975 before taking the post of editor on the long-running but flagging IPC boys' weekly Valiant. He became frustrated at the opposition he faced from the department's traditionalist staff and resigned in mid-1976 to return to freelancing. "Darkie's Mob" was his first commission since leaving the staff role, and Wagner conducted considerable research into the Burma campaign in order to ensure he "got it right". He also requested and got the experienced Mike Western as artist, feeling he "would give the story a solidity and grittiness" that fitted the subject. Western would later list "Darkie's Mob" as his favourite work from his own career, relating that Wagner's scripts "could put the atmosphere on the end of your pen and brush".

== Publishing history ==
The story debuted in the 14 August 1976 edition of Battle Picture Weekly, a soft relaunch issue that featured three other new stories - "Operation Shark", "Yellow Jack" and "The Unknown Soldier" - and a cover commissioned from the famed Don Lawrence. "Darkie's Mob" quickly became hugely popular with readers, though the strip's high level of violence drew some comment. Shortly after the story debuted in Battle, the comic's sister title Action drew critical media coverage for its purported brutality, editor Dave Hunt received a letter of complaint from an MP after a constituent had flagged up an episode where Joe Darkie tied one of his men to a cross and left him for the Japanese. Hunt sent a reply claiming it was based on a real-life incident, and received no further protest. Western would later recall that some of the violence did cause him some discomfort, and that he purposefully reined some of it in. Despite the story's popularity with readers, Wagner wanted to avoid it becoming stale and, feeling it was becoming repetitive, brought the story to a conclusion in June 1977. While Hunt was reluctant to lose such a popular strip, he would later feel that the story "is a classic because it did stop". The character of 'Flyboy' Ferris was added at the suggestion of Battle assistant editor Steve MacManus.

The story's popularity was nevertheless such that when declining sales saw Battle begin a reprint slot in March 1981, "Darkie's Mob" was chosen as the inaugural rerun. In 2003 it was given another repeat, being printed in the 2000 AD Gold section of Judge Dredd Megazine #202 to 210, despite not having featured in 2000 AD In 2011, the complete story was reprinted in a hardback collection by Titan Comics as Darkie's Mob: The Secret War of Joe Darkie.

Since 2016, the rights to the story have been owned by Rebellion Developments.

== Plot summary ==
Following the defeat of Japan at the end of World War II a battered, stained notebook is found in 1946 among the remains of a bloody jungle battle in Burma. Inside is a journal starting on 30 May 1942, when a cut-off group of twenty British Army stragglers from the retreating British Army, trapped on the wrong side of the Chindwin River. With their captain dead and under the command of the injured Lieutenant Meeker, the unit is too weary to argue when a man walks out of the jungle and proclaims himself to be their new commanding officer, Kukri-wielding Captain Joe Darkie. Even the British troops are alarmed when Darkie captures a Japanese scout, who runs away in terror at the mention of Darkie's name, and for the next three days the unit encounters no hostile action as they prepare to cross the river, capturing a Japanese patrol boat. However, Sergeant Samson realises Darkie has instead led them across the Irrawaddy River and behind Japanese lines. Samson and the men object, but Darkie viciously beats Samson and the squad realise they have little choice but to go along with him. The squad begin responding to his ruthless command, and wipe out any Japanese units unfortunate enough to cross their paths.

However, Private Richard 'Shorty' Shortland makes radio contact with headquarters and find out that not only was no Captain Darkie assigned to them, but no Captain Darkie is on record with the Army. Darkie destroys the radio, and the unit votes to summarily execute him. However, the trial is interrupted by a Japanese attack, and the group soon realises they have little chance of survival without Darkie. Only Shorty heard the message, and opts to keep it to himself while writing a journal of the events. Despite being massively outnumbered 'Darkie's Mob' win a string of victories against the Japanese, and even being stabbed through the chest by a Japanese officer in Samurai regalia fails to slow Darkie for long, while Samson is startled to discover that Darkie is a Buddhist. In September the group takes its first casualty when a seemingly lack of medical supplies leaves Private Edritch to die of his wounds; however, after he is buried Darkie discovers Padmore was hoarding the serum and ties him to Edritch's grave for the Japanese to find.

News of the unit's exploits reach British high command, and SOE agent Raymond Reynolds is parachuted behind Japanese lines to find out exactly what is going on. With a little coercion, Darkie persuades Reynolds not to tell the rest of the men about his apparent lack of commission, and to tell his superiors he found no sign of the group. Darkie also amputates Meeker's arm after it goes gangrenous, replacing it with a hook, but he begins to brood after news reaches them of the Chindit expeditions. Another member of the Mob is lost when the group is captured and Private Colston is beheaded before the unit gets free. Alarmed by Darkie's Mob's string of successes, the Japanese step up their efforts to destroy Darkie's Mob, and Private Carling is killed in February 1943 buying time for the squad an escape. The Mob then find themselves in conflicts with the Chindits after Darkie clashes with the major in charge of one of the columns, and tensions rise further after two of the Mob - Kearney and Young - are killed saving the Chindits from an ambush. The major discovers the army's lack of records for Darkie, who plans to head into the jungle alone. However, the remaining ten members of the Mob decide to join him even if he doesn't have any authority, and the rogue unit heads for Rangoon.

They gain a new recruit when they rescue and pressgang downed pilot Ferris in April 1943, promptly using him as bait to flush out a Japanese ambush. 'Flyboy' Ferris however wins Darkie's respect by punching the ersatz captain afterwards. The Japanese meanwhile put out bounties to encourage the Burmese to turn Darkie in, and begin torching villages suspected of being friendly to the troop. A year to the day after Darkie's arrival, Meeker is the latest to die, causing a train collision during a rescue after Samson and a patrol are captured. Soon afterwards, the Mob find themselves surrounded by a thousand Japanese troops on a hilltop but escape into a monsoon, though two more men - Tomlinson and Trench - are killed during the battle. Norman 'Jonesy' Jones is next to go, seemingly losing the will to live as sickness hits the Mob. This leaves Darkie, Johnson, Samson, Flyboy, Smiley, Roper and Shorty as the sole survivors, but after the monsoon season passes the Mob goes back on the offensive. The group is even called out by Tokyo Rose, much to Darkie's delight.

However, in October 1943 a ¥2m bounty sees the group turned in by a Burmese villager and paraded around Mandalay ahead of execution, though civilians help Flyboy escape. He steals a Zero and interrupts the execution. Darkie and the others escape before Flyboy plunges into a bridge out of the city to prevent them being followed. Soon afterwards Johnson is injured and stays behind so the remaining five men can escape. They resolve to capture General Shoto or die trying and infiltrate his camp, but both Roper and Smiley are lost - while Darkie is shot in the gut. He decides to tell Shorty and Samson the truth about himself - he is really an Anglo-Japanese called Joseph Daakee living in Burma who joined a group of bandits. After the Japanese invaded they executed his parents; swearing revenge, he took the uniform of a dead British Army captain and posed as Captain Darkie. He kills Shoto, responsible for ordering his parents' execution, but his condition grows gradually worse as Samson and Shorty try to get him out of the jungle. On 4 November they capture a Japanese launch, but Darkie dies before they can get him medical attention. There, Major McKay accepts Shorty's battle-log as the truth and the pair are to be returned to England. However, at the last moment the pair decide to return to the jungle and continue the battle against the Japanese; neither are ever seen again.

== Collected editions ==
Title	ISBN	Publisher	Release date	Contents
Darkie's Mob: The Secret War of Joe Darkie	1848564422	Titan Books	April 2011	Material from Battle 14 August 1976 to 18 June 1977

== Reception ==
"Darkie's War" has received considerable acclaim. Graham Kibble-White praised the story, and called it one of the darkest strips to appear in Battle. Mike Conroy has also applauded the story, even including Joe Darkie in his book of 500 Great Comic Book Action Heroes. In his autobiography Heartland, author Neil Cross mentioned the death of the group in Battle as "the worst pain I had ever endured". Comic writer, Battle fan and military history enthusiast Garth Ennis has lauded the strip, and wrote a foreword for the 2011 collected edition.

However, the story has received some criticism for both its violence and its portrayal of the Japanese. The Judge Dredd Megazine rerun drew accusations of racism from readers, and in 2023, Michael Molcher opined that the story's "jingoistic language and brutal violence make for uncomfortable reading now". Jochen Eche however has argued that the strip investigated the popular representation of World War II as a 'good war'.
