= Mike Western =

British comics artist (1925–2008)

- Born: 4 February 1925 Southampton, Hampshire, England
- Died: 13 May 2008 (aged 83)
- Area: Artist

Darkie's Mob, from Battle Picture Weekly, 1970s

Mike Western (b. Southampton, 4 February 1925; d. 13 May 2008) was a British comics artist. He worked as a clean-up artist for GB Animation after military service in the Second World War, and later at Halas and Batchelor on their 1954 film adaptation of Animal Farm. In the early 1950s he joined fellow former GB Animation artists Ron ''Nobby'' Clark and Eric Bradbury at Amalgamated Press, drawing adventure strips for Knock-Out, including the western Lucky Logan and the aviation series Johnnie Wingco.

In 1960 he moved to TV Express, where he drew TV tie-ins No Hiding Place and Biggles, the latter in colour. In 1962 he began drawing for Buster, including The Leopard from Lime Street, on which his pencils were inked by Bradbury, When Britain Froze, World in Peril, and The Star of Fortune. The same year he joined the newly launched Valiant, a title he would be associated with for the next thirteen years. One of his most notable strips there was The Wild Wonders (which ran 1968–1973), written by Tom Tully, about a pair of wild boys, brought up by animals, who turn out to be fantastic athletes, for which he used a semi-cartoony style which was much imitated. Other strips Western worked on included Jack O' Justice and The Duke of Dry Gulch. Valiant featured covers on historical topics, and Western drew over 500 of these.

In 1975 he moved to Battle Picture Weekly, where he reverted to a grittier style and drew John Wagner's Darkie's Mob and HMS Nightshade, as well as The Sarge and Tully's The Team That Went to War. He did some work in romance comics, but was not comfortable there, and drew two covers for 2000 AD in 1977 and 1981. He drew Baker's Half-Dozen for short-lived sports title Speed in 1980, then Topps on Two Wheels and Golden Boy for Tiger, and Computer Warrior, The Hard Men, Shadow and The Avenger for the relaunched Eagle. He drew Billy's Boots for Scorcher and Roy of the Rovers for four years, as well as the Roy of the Rovers daily strip in the Daily Star in 1992–93. He then retired from comics, with the exception of a strip in a theatre magazine in 1997–2000, and concentrated on painting and magazine illustration. He died in 2008, aged 83, having been confined to bed for a few months following a heart attack and a stroke.
