= List of Eagle (1982 comic) stories =

A list of stories published in the IPC/Fleetway Publications boys' comic Eagle between 1982 and 1994.

== The Adventures of Fred ==
Published: occasional between 3 April to 25 December 1982
Writer: Barrie Tomlinson

- Humour photo strip. Reputedly discontinued at the request of IPC management.

== The Amstor Computer ==
Published: 24 September 1983 to 7 June 1986
Writers: Barrie Tomlinson, Alan Hebden, Chris Lowder, Ian Rimmer, James Nicholas, A. Stone, J. Louiss, C. Potter, Roy Preston, Brian Burrell, N. Allen, J. Trevelyan, Ian Mennell, Fred Baker, R. Davies, Ken Armstrong, John Richardson
Artist: José Ortiz, John Cooper, Cam Kennedy, Jesus Redondo, Mike Dorey, Ron Turner, John Stokes, Nevio Zeccara, Alberto Giolitti, Ian Kennedy, John Vernon, Mario Capaldi, John Richardson, Dave D'Antiques

Inputting codes into the powerful Amstor Computer generates stories.

- Anthology strip; occasionally returned between 1987 and 1990 as a reprint, sometimes using modified "Tharg's Future Shocks" from 2000 AD.

== Ant Wars ==
Published: 17 May to 23 August 1986
Writer: Gerry Finley-Day
Artists: Jose Ferrer, Eduardo Lozano, Alfonso Azpiri, Jesus Peña

Humanity comes under attack from enormously mutated South American ants.

- Reprinted from 2000 AD.

== Avenger ==
Published: 7 March to 29 August 1987
Writers: John Wagner and Alan Grant (as W. Steele)
Artist: Mike Western

Paul Cannon is a science teacher by day and vigilante by night.

== Beast! ==
Published: 8 September to 22 December 1990
Writer: Tom Tully
Artist: Eric Bradbury

A strange creature prowls a fairground.

== Billy's Boots ==
Published: 6 April 1985 to 10 May 1986.
Writer: Fred Baker
Artist: John Gillatt

After discovering the ancient boots of former footballer Charles 'Dead Shot' Keen, young Billy Dane finds himself playing with the skill of the late England International.

- Continued from Tiger; continued in Roy of the Rovers.

== Bloodfang ==
Published: 9 June 1984 to 30 March 1985
Writers: John Wagner and Alan Grant (as F. Martin Candor)
Artist/s: Jim Baikie, Carlos Cruz-Diez, Vanyo

The life of a Tyrannosaur, later captured by time-travelling bounty hunters and shipped to a zoo in the 22nd century.

- The initial storyline was later reprinted in The Best of Eagle Monthly #6, dated October 1988. The story was translated into French by Aventures & Voyages, renamed "Croc-Rouge" and printed in the anthology Akim in 1988.

== The Brothers ==
Published: 18 February to 1 September 1984
Writers: Scott Goodall, Gerry Finley-Day
Artists: Vanyo

Peter Trent's twin brother Bob is regressed to a primitive mindset by an industrial accident as the pair try to locate their family.

== A Bullet for the Marathon Man ==
Published: 28 July to 11 August 1984
Writer: Alan Grant
Artist: Josep Gual

== Charley's War ==
Published: 30 January 1988 to 21 April 1990
Writers: Pat Mills
Artist: Joe Colquhoun

Charley Bourne fights in the British army during World War I.

- Reprints, continued from Battle.

== The Collector ==
Published: 27 March to 25 December 1982, 19 February 1983
Writers: Roy Preston, Brian Burrell, Alan Moore, Gerry Finley-Day, Malcolm Shaw, Ian Rimmer, Fred Baker, Simon Geller, Ian Mennell

A being called The Collector (Note: No relation to the Marvel Comics character of the same name.) introduces morality tales based around items in his collection.

- Anthology photo strip, though the Collector himself was drawn for the framing sequence by Pat Wright.

== Computer Warrior ==
Published: 6 April 1985 to January 1994
Writers: John Wagner (as D. Spence and R. Clark), Brian Waddle, James Nicholas
Artist: John Cooper, Ian Kennedy, Sandy James, Mike Western, Robin Smith, Mike Dorey, Dave D'Antiques

Bobby Patterson finds he can play computer games for real using a "real life code".

- The first arc was called "The Ultimate Warrior"; it was renamed from 4 May 1985. Games featured included Wizard of Wor, Pastfinder, Rescue on Fractalus!, Ghostbusters, Metro-Cross and Dynasty Wars.

== Comrade Bronski ==
Published: 7 May to 29 August 1987
Writer: Alan Hebden
Artists: Carlos Ezquerra, Mike Dorey

Bronski, a former KGB agent who lost favour and was punished with hard labour, is recalled to Moscow to join the Special Directorate, a newly formed security team created to combat crime and corruption.

== Crowe Street Comp ==
Published: 26 February to 28 July 1983
Writer: Fred Baker
Artist: Rex Archer

The adventures of a group of comprehensive schoolchildren.

== D.A.D.D. ==
Published: 25 January to 10 May 1986
Writer: Scott Goodall
Artists: Horacio Lalia, John Richardson

Dawn Destructor are a rock band whose members are Missy Troll, lead guitarist 'Big Chew' Charlie Carver, keyboardist 'Iceberg' Slim Rodell and bassist Girl Pete. The band members also run a crime-fighting hotline.

== Dan Dare - Pilot of the Future ==
Published: 27 March 1982 to January 1994
Writers: Barrie Tomlinson (as D. Horton), Pat Mills, John Wagner, Tom Tully, B. Jones
Artists: Ron Embleton, Oliver Frey, Ian Kennedy, Frank Hampson, (Note: Reprints on 4 to 11 December 1982.) Carlos Cruz-Diez, Jesus Redondo, John Gillatt, Manuel Carmona, Keith Watson, Andrew Skilleter, Keith Page, David Pugh, Jonathan Howard, John M. Burns

Dan Dare must face the challenge of his great-great-grandfather's oldest enemy, The Mekon.

== Dark Angels ==
Published: 28 April 1990 to 16 February 1991
Writer: Tom Tully
Artists: Francisco Solano López

A group of teenagers leave school and decide to set up a vigilante organisation.

== Death Wish ==
Published: 6 April 1985 to 23 January 1988
Writer: Barrie Tomlinson (as D. Horton)
Artists: Vanyo, Rex Archer

Left with huge facial injuries after a crash, Formula One ace Blake Edmonds dons a mask and sets put to find a stunt that will kill him.

- Continued from Tiger. Renamed "The Incredible Adventures of Blake Edmonds" from 5 September 1987.

== Detective Zed ==
Published: 5 September 1987 to 2 July 1988
Writers: John Wagner and Alan Grant (as A. O'Kay)
Artist/s: Robin Smith, Dave D'Antiques

Scotland Yard has a new detective - the unstoppable robotic Zed.

== Dolebusters ==
Published: 14 June 1986 to 21 February 1987
Writer: Brian Waddle
Artist: John M. Burns

Unemployed friends Chas, Kaz and Dogbone search for jobs and ways to make money.

== Doomlord ==
Published: 27 March to 19 June 1982; 14 August to 24 December 1982; 26 February to 2 July 1983; 24 September 1983 to 14 October 1989
Writers: John Wagner and Alan Grant (as Grant Grover); Alan Grant
Artists: Alberto Giolitti (as Heinzl), Eric Bradbury, Geoff Senior, Dave D'Antiques

A merciless, powerful alien Doomlord judging humanity's right to exist arrives on Earth.

- Initially a photo strip, switched to a conventional picture strip from 24 September 1983. Reprints from 21 October 1989

== The Eagle One-Off ==
Published: 28 April 1990 to June 1991
Writer: David Robinson
Artists: Alan Burrows, John Gillatt, Richard Elson, John Stokes

- Anthology feature.

== The Fifth Horseman ==
Published: 26 February to 16 July 1983
Writer/s: Alan Hebden
Artist: José Ortiz

American adventurer Thaddius Thorn investigates the purported coming of the World Destroyer, the mythical Fifth Horseman.

== The Fists of Danny Pyke ==
Published: 21 September 1983 to 21 July 1984; 18 August 1984 to 30 March 1985
Writer: John Wagner (as D. Spence)
Artists: John M. Burns, Josep Gual

Scouse amateur boxer Danny Pyke aims for the world championship.

== Gaunt ==
Published: 27 December 1984 to 30 March 1985
Writer: John Wagner, Pat Mills
Artist: John Cooper

An unbalanced secret agent is given a superhumanly strong artificial hand to replace one lost during torture.

- Reprinted from Battle Picture Weekly

== Ghost Squad ==
Published: 30 January to 16 July 1988
Writer: Barrie Tomlinson (as D. Horton)
Artists: Vanyo, Rex Archer

A squad of ghost detectives solve crimes.

- The characters had been introduced in "Death Wish".

== Ghostworld ==
Published: 28 April to 21 July 1990
Writer: James Nicholas
Artists: Eric Bradbury

== Gil Hazard - Codename Scorpio ==
Published: 26 February to 2 July 1983
Writer: John Wagner and Alan Grant (as Ian Holland)
Artist/s: Mike Dorey

Secret agent Gil Hazzard finds quitting British Intelligence harder than expected.

- The first five parts were in 3-D stereoscopy.

== Golden Boy ==
Published: 6 April to 5 October 1985
Writer: A. Power
Artist: Mike Western, Sandy James

Athletically gifted feral boy Jamie Speed is discovered running on the moors. Subsequently, Jamie is adopted by a police officer known as Seargent Joe who helps the boy become a professional athlete. However both Jamie and Joe find the world of athletics has an unsavoury side.

- Continued from Tiger.

== The Hand ==
Published: 23 July 1983 to 11 February 1984
Writer: Gerry Finley-Day
Artists: Vanyo

Freelance photographer Luke Hackett loses his left hand in a car accident. It is replaced by that of dead gangster Luca Mancino, and starts to control him.

== The Hard Men ==
Published: 8 November 1986 to 28 February 1987
Writer: Peter Milligan
Artist: Mike Western

MI5 agents Clovis and Chowdhary are blackmailed into carrying out unsanctioned missions.

== House of Correction ==
Published: 11 June to 27 August 1983
Writer: Chris Lowder (as Jack Adrian)

Doctor Heinrich Streicher runs a foreboding sanatorium.

- Photo strip.

== The House of Daemon ==
Published: 11 September 1982 to 12 February 1983
Writers: John Wagner and Alan Grant
Artist: José Ortiz

Architect Elliot Aldrich constructs a dream house for his wife Cassandra. However, the house became possessed by an "evil presence" calling itself Daemon

== The Invisible Boy ==
Published: 2 October to 25 December 1982, 22 January to 19 February 1983, 30 April to 4 June 1983
Writer: Scott Goodall

Schoolboy Tim Talbot discovers he can become invisible.

- Photo strip.

== Jake's Platoon ==
Published: 26 June to 18 September 1982
Writer: Gerry Finley-Day

- Photo strip.

== Joe Alien ==
Published: 6 to 27 May 1989
Artist: Ron Smith

The last survivor of friendly alien planet Xgangbe-4 takes the name Joe Alien and uses his telescopic limbs and highly advanced cybernetic brain to help Wildcat's crew find a new home. As such he is put in charge of Shuttle Two and its exploration team.

- Continued from Wildcat.

== Joe Soap ==
Published: 12 June to 21 August 1982; 1 to 29 January 1983
Writers: John Wagner and Alan Grant (as Grant Grover); Alan Grant

Joseph Soaper - also known as 'Joe Soap' - believes himself to be an "enquiry agent" and took inspiration from the tough private detectives in crime stories. However, he was actually a kind-hearted person - and not very successful at what he did, often overlooking important clues or annoying his clients and the police.

- Photo strip. The character of Joe Soap would reappear during the late 1980s, this time in drawn form, in a comic strip/puzzle feature which would be published in both the Eagle Summer Special and the Eagle Annual of that year. Titled Could You Be a Joe Soap?, it encouraged readers to read the story carefully and try to spot in both the frames and speech balloons all the clues Joe missed.

== Johnny Red ==
Published: 30 January 1988 to 14 October 1989
Writer: Tom Tully
Artist: John Cooper

British fighter pilot Johnny "Red" Redburn starts flying for the Russians in a Hawker Hurricane fighter.

- Reprints, continued from Battle.

== Kid Cops ==
Published: 9 July to 15 October 1988
Artist: José Ortiz

In the 21st century war breaks out on Earth, and most of the adult population travels to the Moon to take part in the fighting. As such children step up to take numerous roles to keep the planet functioning in their absence, including policing.

== Kitten Magee ==
Published: 8 to 29 April 1989; 3 June to 14 October 1989
Artist: José Ortiz, Alan Burrows

Formerly leader and benefactor of the militant World Campaign Against Male Dominance, Kitten Magee provides $20m from her fortune to help fund the Wildcat. As a result, Turbo Jones gives her command of Shuttle Three, backed by her followers and her robot Crud.

- Continued from Wildcat.

== Legend of the Linkits ==
Published: 12 April to 20 December 1986
Writer: G. Douglas
Artist: Rex Archer

In 2063, the Johnson family crashes on the cube-obsessed world of Linkit and find themselves drawn into a civil war.

- Based on the Matchbox toys.

== Loner ==
Published: 29 April to 20 May 1989; 21 October 1989 to 21 April 1990
Artist: David Pugh, Eric Bradbury

The antisocial galactic mercenary known as Loner surprises everyone by putting $20m in his earnings (aided by a lottery win) towards the funding of Wildcat and is given the fourth exploration shuttle. Unlike the other parties he opts to only take his custom six-shooter Babe along to new planets.

- Continued from Wildcat.

== M.A.C.H. 1 ==
Published: 30 August 1986 to 29 August 1987
Writers: Pat Mills, John Wagner, Roy Preston, Steve MacManus, Alan Hebden
Artists: Ian Kennedy, Mike Dorey, John Cooper, Barrie Mitchell, Jesus Redondo, Francisco Solano López, Massimo Belardinelli, Carlos Freixas, Ramon Sola

John Probe is a British Secret Service agent engaging in missions against Communists, terrorists and organised crime.

- Reprinted from 2000 AD.

== M.A.C.H. Zero ==
Published: 5 September to 12 December 1987
Writers: Steve MacManus, Roy Preston (as G. Miller)
Artists: Ian Kennedy, Mike Dorey, John Cooper, Barrie Mitchell, Jesus Redondo, Francisco Solano López, Massimo Belardinelli, Carlos Freixas, Ramon Sola

The early missions of John Probe.

- Reprinted from 2000 AD.

== M.A.S.K. and V.E.N.O.M. ==
Published: 29 October 1988 to 25 March 1989.
Writer: Peter Milligan
Artists: John Cooper, Carlos Pino, Keith Page, A. Williams

M.A.S.K. (Mobile Armored Strike Kommand) is an underground task force, battling the criminal organization V.E.N.O.M. (Vicious Evil Network of Mayhem).

- Continued from M.A.S.K..

== Manix ==
Published: 4 September 1982 to 11 June 1983; 9 July to 10 September 1983; 24 September 1983 to 30 March 1985
Writers: John Wagner and Alan Grant (as Grant Grover); Alan Grant (as Keith Law), Scott Goodall
Artist: Manuel Carmona

Manix is a robotic secret agent, created by a secret department of the British government. His bosses used him to do hidden missions, sometimes using methods that the government and the public wouldn't like. Manix was highly intelligent but unable to think for itself or make moral judgements.

- Initially a photo strip, switched to a conventional picture strip from 9 September 1983.

== Manta Force ==
Published: 5 September 1987 to 23 January 1988
Writers: John Wagner and Alan Grant (as W. Steele), Alan Hebden
Artists: Ian Kennedy, Mike Dorey

Following the successful launch of the M.A.N.T.A. Force ship, the World Government created the Red Venom to help Manta Force colonise New Earth. During its test runs the Red Venom is hijacked by a group of highly skilled soldiers called the Viper Squad. Under the command of Major Vex, the Viper Squad attempted to use the Red Venom to hijack the M.A.N.T.A. Force ship, so they could be the ones to colonise New Earth.

- Based on the Bluebird Toys range.

== Mask of Evil ==
Published: 23 July to 8 October 1988
Artists: Vanyo

Individuals discover a mask created by a wizard that turns the wearer into a villain.

== Monster ==
Published: 1 September 1984 to 30 May 1985
Writers: John Wagner and Alan Grant (as R. Clark)
Artist: Jesus Redondo

A deformed man ('Uncle Terry') who grew up locked in an attic inevitably escapes, tending to murder people he didn't like due to his inhuman strength and lack of social restraint.

- Continued from Scream.

== My Pet Alien! ==
Published: 28 July 1990 to July 1991
Writers: James Nicholas, B. James
Artists: John Gillatt, Eric Bradbury

== News Team ==
Published: 18 February to 25 August 1984
Writer: Alan Hebden
Artists: José Ortiz, Luis Bermejo, Phil Gascoine

A group of investigative TV reporters travel to war-torn countries and other dangerous locations.

== One-Eyed Jack ==
Published: 9 July 1983 to 15 December 1984
Writer: John Wagner
Artist: John Cooper

Eyepatch-wearing Detective Jack McBane undertakes a ruthless war on New York's criminals.

- Reprinted from Valiant.

== Rat Trap ==
Published: 21 October 1989 to 21 April 1991

Serial burglar Doctor Ratty Rat possesses with powerful sonic rasp.

- Revival of the strip from Cor!!. This is sometimes cited as a reprint series but was actually original to Eagle. Both versions of the series had a reader write-in & reward element that would have them unsuitable for reprint. Additionally, the first episode of the Eagle revival features a British prime minister who is clearly meant to be Margaret Thatcher.

== Roadblasters ==
Published: 7 May to 22 October 1988
Writer: Barrie Tomlinson (as D. Horton)
Artist: Manuel Cardona

The Great Race is arranged on the planet Okreb in 2587, with Turbo Force and the Motor Lords battling for supremacy.

- Based on the Matchbox toys. The toys themselves were based on a computer game, which had previously featured in an arc of "Computer Warrior".

== The Robo Machines ==
Published: 10 November 1984 to 27 July 1985
Writer: Tom Tully
Artists: Mario Capaldi, Kim Raymond

Evil scientist Stron-Domez builds Robo Machines and targets conquest of Earth, followed by Security Forces officer Ex-El and his own Robo Machines.

- Based on the Bandai Robo Machine toys.

== S.O.S. ==
Published: 12 October 1985 to 4 October 1986
Writer: Barrie Tomlinson (as D. Horton)
Artist: Sandy James

The Special Operations Squad are an elite anti-terrorist task force consisting of Captain John West, Sergeant Thomas Mackenzie, Corporal Danny Lloyd and Henry ‘Fingers’ Malone called in for the toughest missions.

== Saddle Tramp ==
Published: 26 June to 18 September 1982
Writer: Gerry Finley-Day

A mysterious stranger appears in a Mexican border town in the 1870s.

- Photo strip.

== Soup Squad ==
Published: 29 December 1990 to 16 February 1991
Writer: David Robinson
Artists: Vanyo

A secret division of Scotland Yard, dedicated to investigating cases involving supernatural beings.

== Sgt. Streetwise ==
Published: 27 March 1982 to 19 February 1983; 3 to 17 September 1983; 28 January to 31 March 1984
Writer: Gerry Finley-Day
Artist: John Vernon

DS Wise is an all-action undercover police officer on the streets of 1980s London, and a master of disguise.

- Initially a photo strip, switched to a conventional picture strip from 28 January 1984.

== Shadow ==
Published: 3 August 1985 to 18 January 1986
Writers: John Wagner and Alan Grant (as Rick Clark)
Artist: Mike Western

Police dog Shadow hunts for his master's killer.

== Star Rider ==
Published: 6 April 1985 to 6 February 1986
Artist: Jose Casanova, Phil Gascoine

- Continued from Tiger.

== Starcom ==
Published: 24 September to 8 October 1988

Starcom protects Earth from the evil Emperor Dark.

- Based on the Mattel toys.

== Storm Force ==
Published: 9 January 1988 to 21 April 1990
Writers: James Nicholas
Artists: Vanyo

The Mole commands anti-terrorist unit Storm Force - consisting of Storm, Stiletto, Magnus, Griffin, Mikron and Porcupine - against foes including Tarantula and the Web Masters.

- Continued from Battle. Reprinted from May 1991.

== Survival ==
Published: 7 March 1987 to 30 April 1988
Writer: Barrie Tomlinson (as D. Horton)
Artist: José Ortiz

A deadly virus wipes out most of Earth's population apart from a few people with a rare blood group, including young Mark Davies.

== The Thirteenth Floor ==
Published: 1 September 1984 to 28 February 1987
Writers: John Wagner and Alan Grant (under the pseudonym Ian Holland)
Artist: José Ortiz

Crazed computer Max in charge of an elevator in a 17-storey apartment building - when someone bad or evil steps inside, Max would take them to The Thirteenth Floor, a virtual reality where they would be tormented or killed.

- Max later functioned as the fictional editor of Eagle. The strip was later reprinted from 23 February 1991.

== Thunderbolt & Smokey! ==
Published: 27 March to 25 September 1982
Writer: Tom Tully

Two talented young footballers - Colin 'Thunderbolt' Dexter and Leo 'Smokey' Beckles - attempt to recruit an under-14s team for their school.

- Photo strip.

== Timespell ==
Published: 11 October 1986 to 28 February 1987
Writer: Barrie Tomlinson (as D. Horton)
Artists: Ian Kennedy, Sandy James

After Simon Studkins saves the life of a tiny magical creature, it grants him wishes - though they have a tendency to backfire.

== The Tower King ==
Published: 27 March to 4 September 1982
Writers: John Wagner and Alan Grant
Artist: José Ortiz

A malfunctioning solar-powered satellite bathes the Earth in radiation that makes the production of electricity in any form impossible. Without heating, transport, food, or communication and in the middle of a heavy winter, London swiftly falls into mass panic, resulting in pseudo-medieval anarchy.

== Toys of Doom ==
Published: 21 October 1989 to 21 April 1991
Artists: Eric Bradbury

Orphan Nick Jardine finds his late grandfather's collection of killer toys.

- A sequel to the story from Buster.

== Turbo Jones ==
Published: 8 to 22 April 1989; 3 to 10 June 1989
Artist: Vanyo

Science-hero Turbo Jones discovered the meteor shower set to destroy Earth in 2492, and is the driving force behind the Wildcat mission. He also heads up one of the exploration teams, aided by cyborg chimpanzee Robo.

- Continued from Wildcat.

== Walk or Die ==
Published: 18 June to 17 September 1983
Writer/s: Scott Goodall
Artist: Ramon Escolano Metaute

A group of children on a school trip to Canada become stranded in the wilderness after a plane crash.

- Initially a photo strip, switched to a conventional picture strip from 24 September 1983.
