= Loner (comics) =

British comic book character

- Character poster of Loner from Wildcat No.4 (dated 3 December 1988), art by David Pugh.

Character information
- First appearance: Wildcat Preview (15 October 1988)
- Created by: Barrie Tomlinson

In-story information
- Full name: Unknown
- Species: Human
- Place of origin: Earth
- Team affiliations: Wildcat Four
- Abilities: Expert shot

Publication information
- Publisher: Fleetway Publications
- Schedule: Weekly
- Title(s): Wildcat Preview; 15 October 1988; Wildcat; 22 October 1988 to 25 March 1989; Wildcat Holiday Special; 1989; Wildcat Winter Special; 1989; Eagle; 29 April to 20 May 1989; 21 October 1989 to 21 April 1990
- Formats: Original material for the series has been published as a strip in the comics anthology(s) Wildcat; Eagle.
- Genre: Science fiction
- Publication date: 15 October 1988 – 21 April 1990

Creative team
- Writer(s): Barrie Tomlinson; James Tomlinson
- Artist(s): David Pugh; Eric Bradbury
- Editor(s): Barrie Tomlinson

Loner is a British comic character, appearing in strips published by Fleetway Publications. The character debuted in the preview issue of the science fiction anthology Wildcat, included in titles dated 15 October 1988. The character's eponymous strip was one of the four linked ongoing serials in Wildcat, and was continued in Eagle after Wildcat was cancelled. A former mercenary and lone wolf, the self-described Loner puts $20m of his career earnings towards the Wildcat mission in order to leave the doomed Earth. As the crew search for a new planet for colonisation he is assigned to exploration shuttle Wildcat 4. Unlike the other shuttles, which are crewed by teams, Loner's only companion on Wildcat 4 is his custom gun - which he has named 'Babe'.

== Creation ==
Fleetway Publications set boys' adventure group editor Barrie Tomlinson to the task of creating a version of 2000 AD in 1988; he devised the idea of Wildcat, an anthology with five parallel, linked but separate storylines, including "Loner". He would later note that the diversity of the comic broke new ground; at the time having a black character as a lead in a British boys' comic was "slightly revolutionary".

Ian Kennedy would design the cast of Wildcat. David Pugh - who had been drawing "Sláine" for 2000 AD since 1984 and worked on the licensed M.A.S.K. title - was assigned to draw the strip, and Kennedy tailored the design accordingly. Pugh drew inspiration from Jimi Hendrix and Baaba Maal for the look of the character.

== Publishing history ==
Loner and the other Wildcat characters first appeared in Wildcat Preview, a free comic with art by Kennedy provided with several other Fleetway comics from the week ending 15 October 1989, with the regular title starting the following week. While Tomlinson passed the regular writing of "Kitten Magee" and "Joe Alien" to Nicholas Tomlinson and David Robinson respectively he continued writing the fortnightly episodes of "Loner" and "Turbo Jones". Tomlinson felt Pugh's art on "Loner" was important in keeping up the quality following in from Kennedy.

Wildcat however came out at a time when comic sales in the UK were in a sharp decline. The title lasted only 12 issues before being cancelled and merged into Eagle, where a lack of space meant the features had to rotate, with "Turbo Jones" and "Kitten Magee" finishing off the storylines in progress when Wildcat was cancelled before "Loner" took over from the former from the 29 April 1989 edition of Eagle for four weeks. Despite greatly enjoying drawing "Loner" (later referring to it as "the happiest year of my comic career"), Pugh found an offer to work alongside Keith Watson on "Dan Dare" (also in Eagle) was too good to turn down. Veteran Eric Bradbury took over drawing the strip from October 1989. The Bradbury-drawn story ran until 21 April 1990 - the last survivor of the Wildcat stories. Shortly after the story finished, "Loner" was repackaged on behalf of Fleetway by Dez Skinn's Quality Communications and issued in North America as a seven-part mini-series between November 1990 and May 1991.

The contents of Wildcat - including "Loner" - were among the properties purchased from Fleetway owners Egmont Publishing in 2016. In 2018 Rebellion announced plans to reprint the contents of Wildcat in collected editions under their Treasury of British Comics imprint. The collected edition of "Loner" was released in September 2019, featuring the complete Wildcat and Eagle stories (including specials and annuals) in a single volume.

== Plot summary ==
In 2488 Turbo Jones fails to convince the Supreme Earth Council of Earth's forthcoming doom, and instead starts the Wildcat project to ensure some of the planet's population are able to escape and start a new home. He begins stringently screening volunteers for a place on the crew, and the former bounty hunter Loner wins a space onboard by donating $20m in funding for the construction of the Wildcat spacecraft, which launches three years later - shortly before Earth is destroyed. Joe Alien discovers a planet with suitable Earth-like conditions and four shuttles are sent down to the surface to investigate.

Loner pilots Wildcat 4 down himself, taking only his firearm Babe - a heavily customised antique revolver - along due to his preference for working alone. With the unnamed planet's background radiation disabling communications, he instead makes contact with a race of furry, electric-generating creatures who end up overwhelming him. Loner finds himself taken before a huge lizard-like telepathic warrior of the alien Bellari, who has also been imprisoned on the planet and taken control of the creatures. He is coerced into fighting a large beast living in the caverns, and physically modifies him so he can use Bellary weaponry for the task. While Loner kills the beast, he is also able to use the weaponry to destroy the lizard, freeing the furry creatures from his control. He later comes into contact with a Seringar shape-changer which shrinks him down to a minute size, exposing Loner to the planet's insect life. After being frozen and briefly ejected into space, Loner finds himself relying on the 'Fuzzballs' for help; they are with what they believe to be a full-sized version of Loner. After making peace the Seringar he is returned to normal size, and the two versions are merged as Loner returns to the Wildcat.

Along with Turbo Jones, Kitten Magee and Joe Alien, Loner was later kidnapped by an alien Gamemaster of the Glarzon race, and were forced into combat. However, the Glarzon released them after the quartet decimated the troops expected to kill them. The planet was eventually made habitable and colonised by the passengers of the Wildcat. However, Loner soon grew bored with pastoral life and returned to the life of a bounty hunter.

== Collected editions ==
Title	ISBN	Publisher	Release date	Contents
Loner	9781781086841	Rebellion Developments	4 September 2019	Material from Wildcat 22 October 1988 to 7 April 1989, Wildcat Winter Special 1989, Wildcat Holiday Special 1989, Eagle 29 April 1989 to 21 April 1990, Eagle Holiday Special 1990 and Eagle Annual 1991

== Reception ==
Reviewing the collected edition, Steve Holland felt the Wildcat stories of "Loner" became repetitive to being sent on the same planet, and preferred the wider-roaming Eagle material. Lew Stringer meanwhile praised Tomlinson's "fast, exciting pace" and Pugh's detailed artwork.
