= Turbo Jones =

British comic book character

- Character poster of Turbo Jones from Wildcat No.6 (dated 31 December 1988), art by Vanyo.

Character information
- First appearance: Wildcat Preview (15 October 1988)
- Created by: Barrie Tomlinson

In-story information
- Full name: Turbo Jones
- Species: Human
- Place of origin: Earth
- Team affiliations: Wildcat One
- Partnerships: Robo
- Abilities: Scientific genius

Publication information
- Publisher: Fleetway Publications
- Schedule: Weekly
- Title(s): Wildcat Preview; 15 October 1988; Wildcat; 22 October 1988 to 25 March 1989; Wildcat Holiday Special; 1989; Wildcat Winter Special; 1989; Eagle; 8 to 22 April 1989; 3 to 10 June 1989
- Formats: Original material for the series has been published as a strip in the comics anthology(s) Wildcat; Eagle.
- Genre: Science fiction
- Publication date: 15 October 1988 – 22 April 1989

Creative team
- Writer(s): Barrie Tomlinson
- Artist(s): Ian Kennedy; Vanyo; Keith Page
- Editor(s): Barrie Tomlinson

Turbo Jones is a British comic character, appearing in strips published by Fleetway Publications. The character debuted in the preview issue of the science fiction anthology Wildcat, included in titles dated 15 October 1988. The character's eponymous strip was one of the four linked ongoing serials in Wildcat, and was continued briefly in Eagle after Wildcat was cancelled. A brilliant scientist, Turbo Jones sinks his knowledge and invention into creating the colony ship Wildcat after his warnings of disaster for Earth is dismissed by the authorities. As well as being the de-facto commander of Wildcat, Jones pilots exploration shuttle Wildcat One, aided by his companion Robo.

== Creation ==
As group editor of Fleetway Publications' boys' adventure line, Barrie Tomlinson was tasked with creating a new science fiction anthology to function as a version of 2000 AD, which it was felt was becoming too adult for younger readers. The result of Tomlinson's work was Wildcat; despite being an anthology like most British comics of the time, the five stories in each fortnightly issue were part of an overall linked story - while also independent up to a point to allow flexibility for the creative teams. Tomlinson devised the characters for the story before handing design over to Ian Kennedy.

While Tomlinson attempted to make the other feature characters - Loner, Kitten Magee and Joe Alien - unusual, Turbo Jones was planned as a more traditional hero, though he provided him with cyborg sidekick Robo to offset the seriousness of the strip. Due to other commitments, Kennedy would only be available for the first regular episode; instead Vanyo would take over as regular artists, having recently had the long-running "Death Wish" (also written by Tomlinson) finish in Eagle. While Tomlinson would pass "Joe Alien" and "Kitten Magee" off to other writers after sketching the premise, he would stay as writer on both "Loner" and "Turbo Jones".

== Publishing history ==
The regular Wildcat was preceded by free issue Wildcat Preview, included with several Fleetway titles dated 15 or 22 October 1988; the first regular issue shared the latter date. However, the fortnightly comic failed to find an audience and ran for only 12 editions before low sales forced it to be folded into weekly sister title Eagle in March 1989. As there was limited space in the Eagle and Wildcat only two slots were available, so the Wildcat serials would rotate; "Turbo Jones" appeared for three weeks in April 1989 to conclude the storyline before being swapped out for "Loner". The strip would make one last appearance across two episodes in June 1989 before ending. Shortly after the story finished, "Turbo Jones" was repackaged on behalf of Fleetway by Dez Skinn's Quality Communications and issued in North America as the one-shot Turbo Jones - Pathfinder, with a new cover by Dave Dorman.

Wildcat and its strips - including "Turbo Jones" - were among the properties purchased from Fleetway owners Egmont Publishing in 2016. In 2018 Rebellion announced plans to reprint the contents of Wildcat in collected editions under their Treasury of British Comics imprint. The first of these was the collected edition of "Turbo Jones" in January 2019, featuring the complete Wildcat and Eagle stories (including specials and annuals) in a single volume. Tomlinson and Kennedy carried out a signing tour to promote the volume.

== Plot summary ==
In 2488, prominent scientist Turbo Jones (a Professor of Earth History at the Thatcher University of Science) fails to convince the Supreme Earth Council of Earth's forthcoming doom after realising it will be destroyed in 12 years. Instead, Jones goes public with his concerns in order to ensure the survival of the human race. He starts the Wildcat project to ensure some of the planet's population are able to escape and start a new home, and begins stringently screening volunteers for a place on the crew. He selects three unusual lieutenants - former mercenary Loner, spiky feminist Kitten Magee and super-intelligent extra-terrestrial Joe Alien - and construction of the huge Wildcat spacecraft begins in Earth orbit. Three years later the work is complete and the Wildcat heads into space to search for a suitable planet to colonise; shortly afterwards Earth is destroyed, while Joe Alien detects a planet that should support human life.

As interference prevents the planet being scanned, Turbo and his lieutenants head down to investigate the four continents in the ship's shuttles. Turbo takes his robotic companion Robo and a squad of troopers down in Wildcat One. The team soon found themselves caught in the middle of a civil war between two of the unnamed planet's indigenous races, the Burroids - ruled by a huge organic brain - and the Arglons - who ride massive dinosaur-like creatures into battle. Turbo Jones puts himself in the service of the Burroids to help end the war, angering skeleton Arglon leader the Great Ark. Jones is taken prisoner by the Arglons but escapes with the help of Robo. The Arglons target Wildcat with a missile in response; he was able to use one of their spacecraft to prevent the attack but then found himself put on trial for treason by the Burroids. Turbo is sentenced to the ordeal of walking through the Valley of Death but with help from Robo he survived and returned to the Wildcat.

After conferring with Loner and Joe Alien, he returns to the surface once again but returns in time to save Wildcat from being taken over by an alien warlord. Along with Loner, Kitten Magee and Joe Alien, Loner was later kidnapped by an alien Gamemaster of the Glarzon race, and were forced into combat. However, the Glarzon released them after the quartet decimated the troops expected to kill them.

== Collected editions ==
Title	ISBN	Publisher	Release date	Contents
Turbo Jones	9781781086841	Rebellion Developments	10 January 2019	Material from Wildcat 22 October 1988 to 7 April 1989, Wildcat Winter Special 1989, Wildcat Holiday Special 1989 and Eagle 8 to 22 April & 3 to 10 June 1989

== Reception ==
Reviewing the collected edition for Broken Frontier, Tony Ingram enjoyed the set-up of "Turbo Jones" but felt it became repetitive once it arrived on the planet's surface, and also noted the similarity of the character's role to Superman's father Jor-El. Despite some reservations, including about Turbo's treatment of Robo and why dialogue referred to the latter as a robot when he resembled an augmented ape, he concluded that overall it was "an enjoyable romp through one of the less remembered corners of the IPC universe". Tim Hayes of Tripwire also drew comparisons with the actions of Jor-El but enjoyed some of the story's quirks, surmising it was a "fast-paced doomy space opera with big lizards and brains in jars". Graham Kibble-White felt the character was too traditional and the least interesting of the Wildcat characters, despite being amused by the name Turbo Jones.
