= Kitten Magee =

British comic book character

- Character poster of Kitten Magee (with Crud the robot underfoot) from Wildcat No.1 (dated 22 October 1988), art by José Ortiz.

Character information
- First appearance: Wildcat Preview (15 October 1988)
- Created by: Barrie Tomlinson

In-story information
- Full name: Kitten Magee
- Species: Human
- Place of origin: Earth
- Team affiliations: World Campaign Against Male Dominance; Wildcat Three
- Partnerships: Casandra Cardeti; Doc Barnes; Bonnie Fox; Aurora; Crud
- Abilities: Weapons and combat expert

Publication information
- Publisher: Fleetway Publications
- Schedule: Weekly
- Title(s): Wildcat Preview; 15 October 1988; Wildcat; 22 October 1988 to 25 March 1989; Wildcat Holiday Special; 1989; Wildcat Winter Special; 1989; Eagle; 8 to 29 April 1989; 3 June to 14 October 1989
- Formats: Original material for the series has been published as a strip in the comics anthology(s) Wildcat; Eagle.
- Genre: Science fiction
- Publication date: 15 October 1988 – 14 October 1989

Creative team
- Writer(s): Barrie Tomlinson; James Tomlinson
- Artist(s): José Ortiz; Alan Burrows
- Editor(s): Barrie Tomlinson

Kitten Magee is a British comic character, appearing in strips published by Fleetway Publications. The character debuted in the preview issue of the science fiction anthology Wildcat, included in titles dated 15 October 1988. The character's eponymous strip was one of the four linked ongoing serials in Wildcat, and was continued in Eagle after Wildcat was cancelled. A militant feminist and former leader of the World Campaign Against Male Domination, Kitten Magee joins the Wildcat mission to help humanity find a new home after donating a $20m inheritance towards the ship's construction. She is subsequently placed in charge of the exploration shuttle Wildcat 3 with her handpicked all-female team - Doc Barnes, Casandra Cardeti and Bonnie Fox - and her hated, sycophantic robot Crud.

== Creation ==
Charged by Fleetway Publications with creating a new science fiction anthology comic as a counterpart to 2000 AD in 1988, group editor Barrie Tomlinson took a day off and worked from home, creating the linking story for Wildcat and its main protagonists, including Kitten Magee. Tomlinson would later note "it was slightly revolutionary to have an entire female cast in a boys' comic". After coming up with the basic premise of "Kitten Magee", Tomlinson handed his early outline over to his son James, who had written for Battle and Eagle under the pseudonym James Nicholas to avoid accusations of nepotism.

James Tomlinson devised the all-female supporting cast for the script, including the characters of Casandra Cardeti, Bonnie Fox and Doc Barnes. The format of Wildcat allowed him considerable scope for planning the storyline, and he greatly enjoyed the interaction of the characters - comparing the challenge of writing complex interactions among explorers as an area that interested him as a fan of Doctor Who. He would later suggest Magee could be seen as a forerunner to strong female heroines such as the title characters of Buffy the Vampire Slayer and Xena: Warrior Princess, and in 2019 stated "I would like to imagine that Kitten, Crud, Bonnie, Doc and Cassandra [sic] are still out there somewhere doing their bit for Girl Power, exploring strange, dangerous worlds and kicking aliens where it hurts!".

The strip was drawn by the experienced José Ortiz, who had recently been freed up by the ending of "Kid Cops" in Eagle". "Kitten Magee" would be among Ortiz's last work for the British comics industry.

== Publishing history ==
Kitten Magee first appeared in the Wildcat Preview, a free insert given away with other Fleetway boys' comics dated 15 or 29 October 1988, drawn by Ian Kennedy, before continuing in the fortnightly Wildcat itself in five-page episodes by Nicholas Tomlinson and Ortiz. However, at the time the British comics market was contracting and Wildcat was cancelled and merged with Eagle after only 12 issues. Some unused material was published in two Wildcat specials issued in 1989 while the strips were continued on rotation in Eagle; the ongoing storyline of "Kitten Magee" was tied up in a four-issue run in April, before returning for a longer stint from June to October the same year, with Alan Burrows taking over as artist from August.

"Kitten Magee" and the other stories from Wildcat were among the properties purchased from Fleetway owners Egmont Publishing in 2016. In 2018 Rebellion announced plans to reprint the contents of Wildcat in collected editions under their Treasury of British Comics imprint. Despite being planned for 2020, a collected edition of "Kitten Magee" failed to appear. As of 2026 only "Turbo Jones" and "Loner" have been released, with "Kitten Magee" still uncollected.

== Plot summary ==
In 2488, scientist Turbo Jones addresses the Supreme Earth Council as his research has indicated Earth will be destroyed by a meteor storm. His concerns are dismissed, so he plans to build the spaceship Wildcat to evacuate some of Earth's population, holding open interviews for potential crew members. One of those selected is Kitten Magee, formerly leader of the feminist World Campaign Against Male Domination, and an expert in both unarmed and armed combat - particularly using laser wrist-bands. She pledges her fortune of $20m, which she claims to have inherited from her father. The Wildcat is completed three years later and moves off to find a world suitable for colonisation shortly before Earth is destroyed ahead of Jones' prediction. Kitten claims to be 25, but unknown to the others on the Wildcat, is using "life dust" (hidden within Crud) to hide her true age, which although unspecified is possibly a thousand years old.

After Joe Alien finds a planet with a suitable Earth-type atmosphere, four shuttles are sent down to the surface to escape. Magee took command of Wildcat 3, dispatched to the planet's tropical jungle. She insists on a hand-picked crew of her friends as back-up - science expert Doc Barnes, impulsive bazooka-toting Casandra Cardeti, tough Bonnie Fox and Aurora, as well as Crud. They soon find out the majority of the lifeforms in the jungle are hostile, though the group prove a match for them. After another battle, they learn that some of those attacking them are actually robots, controlled by the obese, hostile Hobos. Finding his minions of little use, Hobos feigns being friendly and attempts to lead them into lethal situations; Kitten and her comrades survive however, and leads them to his city while continuing to hide his true nature. Once there, he attempts to kill Kitten, but the rest of the team breaks free, and discovers that the Hoboans attempted to wipe another civilisation to build their city, the Kirak. They strike an alliance with the surviving Kirak. Kitten meanwhile escapes with the help of Crud and eventually her team and the Kirak kill Hobos and overthrow his people.

As the expedition continues, Casandra discovers Kitten's secret - though the others do not believe her. They come under attack from the savage Zxiiz, who attempt to trap them in their ship. While Kitten explores, the rest are caught by the Zxiiz and strapped into the Nightmare Machine. Aurora is turned into a giant maggot, but Kitten is able to force the Zxiiz into reversing the process as Kitten and her followers find themselves caught up in a three-way struggle between the Zxiiz, Zoowaas and the Skiggles as they continue to explore the jungle.

Along with Jones, Loner and Joe Alien, Kitten was later kidnapped by an alien Gamemaster of the Glarzon race, and were forced into combat. However, the Glarzon released them after the quartet decimated the troops expected to kill them.

== Reception ==
Artist Tracey Emin is a fan of the character, and has a page covering the character on her official website as a "testament to a science fiction story which held more untapped potential which, like so many others of its kind, was never allowed to fully come to fruition".
