= Computer Warrior =

British comic book story

- Bobby Patterson, a.k.a. Computer Warrior, on the cover of Eagle, dated 5 August 1989.

Character information
- First appearance: Eagle (6 April 1985)

In-story information
- Full name: Robert 'Bobby' Patterson
- Species: Human
- Place of origin: Earth
- Partnerships: Martin French

Publication information
- Publisher: IPC Magazines; 1982 to 1987; Fleetway Publications; 1987 to 1994
- Schedule: Weekly
- Title(s): Eagle "The Ultimate Warrior"; 6 to 27 April 1985 "Computer Warrior"; 4 May 1985 to January 1994
- Formats: Original material for the series has been published as a strip in the comics anthology(s) Eagle.
- Genre: Action/adventure
- Publication date: 6 April 1985 – January 1994

Creative team
- Writer(s): John Wagner (Note: Credited as 'D. Spence' and 'R. Clark'.); Brian Waddle; James Nicholas; Tom Tully
- Artist(s): John Cooper; Ian Kennedy; Sandy James; Mike Western; Robin Smith; Mike Dorey; Dave D'Antiques
- Editor(s): Dave Hunt; Terry Magee; Barrie Tomlinson

"Computer Warrior" (initially "The Ultimate Warrior") is a British comic strip, appearing in titles published by IPC Magazines. The story was published in the anthology Eagle from 6 April 1985 to January 1994, initially written by John Wagner and drawn by John Cooper. The story followed the eponymous Computer Warrior - a video game expert called Bobby Patterson, who gained the ability to enter computer games. Both fictional and real games were featured in the story, which ran until Eagle was cancelled in 1994.

== Creation ==
In April 1985, Eagle incorporated sister title Tiger. As well as continuing selected strips from both Eagle and Tiger, as was customary for merged IPC titles Eagle and Tiger also featured a brand-new story. This was "The Ultimate Warrior", devised by John Wagner - a prolific contributor to IPC comics in general (most notably as co-creator of 2000 AD's Judge Dredd) and the relaunched Eagle in particular - and his writing partner Alan Grant. While the pair worked together on the concept, only Wagner would submit the scripts. The initial four-part story was drawn by the experienced John Cooper, who had worked with Wagner on Valiant story "One-Eyed Jack".

Grant could not recall if he and Wagner had seen the similarly themed 1982 film Tron; he liked the format of the strip, noting "something similar could still be successful today" and noting it as having an inverse concept to TV series Ace Lightning, which he also wrote for.

== Publishing history ==
Due to the sheer number of scripts Wagner and Grant submitted to IPC, editorial director John Sanders insisted the pair use pen names for much of their work; as such the story was initially credited to 'D. Spence', which Wagner had previously used for boxing strip "The Fists of Danny Pyke".

The first four-part story featured a fictional game created by Wagner and Cooper called Zyklon Invasion, but from 4 May 1984 it was renamed "The Computer Warrior" and began mainly featuring real-life games sent in by manufacturers, with Commodore sending the pair a console and a selection of games. However, Wagner and Grant proved to be poor at playing the games and eventually had to request they were sent videos of gameplay. Many of the games featured were featured in parallel competitions and other promotions in Eagle alongside the strip.

The strip proved popular with readers, and would run until Eagle itself was cancelled at the start of 1994, a record only matched by Dan Dare. Brian Waddle contributed some scripts in 1987, while in 1990 Wagner was credited under another pseudonym, 'R. Clark', for a few months before James Nicholas took over as writer from August 1990 (aside from a single fill-in episode by Tom Tully). Ian Kennedy, Mike Western, Robin Smith, Mike Dorey and Dave D'Antiques were among those to draw the series.

The Eagle became a monthly comic in the early nineties; "Computer Warrior" and "Dan Dare" became the only strips that weren't reprints. The comic eventually ceased production in January 1994 and the storyline was quickly wrapped up.

== Plot ==
Bobby Patterson's friend Martin French mysteriously disappears. Bobby receives a message in which Martin reveals that he had discovered a code to activate a 'real life facility' on his computer, enabling him to literally enter the computer games realm - and that his disappearance means that he has lost a game and is now trapped within the Nightmare Zone. In order to rescue Martin, Bobby must practice on the games before using the code to play the games in the computer realm. A single loss would mean Bobby himself would also be trapped in the Nightmare Zone. The only way for Bobby to free Martin was to complete 10 games himself using the code. Bobby made great progress through the tests, including overcoming various real life problems with his mother and father. Once Martin had the chance to free himself by finding a secret tunnel in the Nightmare Zone where he met the computer who gave him one chance to escape, by completing without practice the game UggaBulla. He failed. Eventually Bobby saw through all ten games, Martin was rescued and Bobby gained the title of Computer Warrior.

Bobby then discovered the purpose of the challenge was to find a champion to defeat the dark forces of the Nightmare Zone. The realm's ruler, the Computer Warlord, gathered together all qualified Computer Warriors and eliminated them one by one before banishing them to the Nightmare Zone in a series of tests to find the 'Ultimate Warrior'. As before, each test was the successful completion of a popular computer game of the time. Bobby made friends and enemies amongst the other Computer Warriors as the tests went on, but eventually Bobby emerged triumphant and became the Computer Warlord's champion; the other Computer Warriors being freed from the Nightmare Zone.

The Computer Warlord then set Bobby five more tests to defeat the Nightmare Zone creatures once and for all. In the final test the Nightmare Zone creatures picked a champion to defeat Bobby - his evil self. Bobby defeated this last enemy and the Nightmare Zone creatures were trapped in a 'cube of holding' by the Warlord.

In later stories, Bobby defeated various Nightmare Zone creatures who refused to enter the cube and then became the Computer Warlord, the old one having died and bequeathing the title to Bobby. Bobby used his new found status to invite Eagle readers to play real life games.

In one of Eagle's many revamps, a new attempt was made to refresh the Computer Warrior storyline. Bobby was summoned before the Council of Warlords to be told he wasn't really a Computer Warlord, and they demoted him back to Computer Warrior. Another Warlord named Baal explained to Bobby that they too were being attacked by Nightmare Zone creatures and he needed a champion to defeat them. Bobby then proceeded to complete more video games under Baal's direction.

The Eagle concluded its run in January 1994. For the final video game test, Bobby played Another World. When this was successfully completed, he was told by Baal that "no test had been too great" and he had now defeated the Nightmare Zone forces. How he achieved this was left unexplained. Bobby was returned to his home and told that all his adventures had taken place in seconds in the real world and he would no longer be needed. Bobby pleaded with Baal to come back but had to contend with himself that he would miss being the Computer Warrior.

=== Games featured ===
While the comic featured both fictional and real games, the majority of the titles were games published in the UK by U.S. Gold for 8 and 16 bit computers.

In earlier issues, the computer used had the appearance of a Commodore 64, but was later changed to resemble an Atari St without explanation

- Zyklon Attack†
- Wizard of Wor
- Pastfinder
- Rescue on Fractalus!
- The Great American Cross-Country Road Race
- Ghostbusters
- Walls of Jericho†
- Desert Fox
- Psi 5 Trading Company
- Uggabulla†
- Silent Service
- Kung Fu Master
- Infiltrator+
- Gauntlet
- Express Raider
- World Games
- Ace of Aces
- Metro Cross
- Impossible Mission II
- Side Arms Hyper Dyne
- Black Christmas†
- Wizard Warz
- Battlefield 3000†
- 4th & Inches
- Dream Warrior
- Blood of Dracula
- Bionic Commando
- RoadBlasters
- ThunderBlade
- The Deep
- Zak McKracken and the Alien Mindbenders
- Forgotten Worlds
- Indiana Jones and the Last Crusade: The Action Game
- Slay Ride‡
- Turbo Outrun
- Ghouls and Ghosts
- Black Tiger
- Crackdown
- Dynasty Wars
- U.N. Squadron
- Time Warrior†
- ESWAT
- Space Attack†
- Mercs
- Army War†
- Street Fighter 2
- Another World
- † = Fictional game.
- ‡ = Fictional game, devised by Eagle readers.
