= Joe Alien =

British comic book character

- Character poster of Joe Alien from Wildcat No.2 (dated 5 November 1988); art by Ron Smith.

Character information
- First appearance: Wildcat Preview (15 October 1988)
- Created by: Barrie Tomlinson

In-story information
- Full name: Unknown
- Species: Xgangbe
- Place of origin: Xgangbe-4
- Team affiliations: Wildcat Two
- Abilities: Telescopic limbs High intelligence

Publication information
- Publisher: Fleetway Publications
- Schedule: Weekly
- Title(s): Wildcat Preview; 15 October 1988; Wildcat; 22 October 1988 to 25 March 1989; Wildcat Holiday Special; 1989; Wildcat Winter Special; 1989; Eagle; 6 to 27 May 1989
- Formats: Original material for the series has been published as a strip in the comics anthology(s) Wildcat; Eagle.
- Genre: Science fiction
- Publication date: 15 October 1988 – 27 May 1989

Creative team
- Writer(s): Barrie Tomlinson; David Robinson
- Artist(s): Massimo Belardinelli; Ron Smith
- Editor(s): Barrie Tomlinson

Joe Alien is a British comic character, appearing in strips published by Fleetway Publications. The character debuted in the preview issue of the science fiction anthology Wildcat, included in titles dated 15 October 1988. The character's eponymous strip was one of the four linked ongoing serials in Wildcat, and was later briefly featured in Eagle after Wildcat was cancelled. Joe Alien is an identity taken on by the last survivor of the friendly planet Xgangbe-4, and joins the Wildcat mission to help humanity find a new home. He is placed in command of the Wildcat 2 exploration shuttle.

== Creation ==
Shortly after IPC Magazines sold their comics interests to Robert Maxwell's Mirror Group Newspapers under the Fleetway Publications, group editor Barrie Tomlinson was charged with creating a new science fiction anthology as a junior version of 2000 AD. Tomlinson devised a format whereby all five features in the fortnightly comic would link together to form an overall narrative, as different events centred on the spaceship Wildcat.

As such, he created four lead characters - Turbo Jones, Loner, Kitten Magee and Joe Alien - to act as heads of exploration teams, with the fifth slot to be a one-off tales taking place on the mothership. Tomlinson penned the initial episodes of the stories before some were passed to other writers, beginning his work with a preview comic introducing the premise that was given away with Fleetway titles 2000 AD, Eagle, Roy of the Rovers, Buster, Oink!, Whizzer and Chips and M.A.S.K. dated 15 October or 22 October 1988. Massimo Belardinelli, an experienced 2000 AD artist on strips that included "Ace Trucking Co." and had a knack for creating alien worlds, was assigned to draw the opening episodes of "Joe Alien"; Tomlinson felt his art brought the "story to life".

== Publishing history ==
The regular Wildcat began with an issue dated 22 October 1988. The 32-page comic featured high production values for the period, and to enhance Belardinelli's artwork "Joe Alien" was selected as the comic's colour strip. From the third issue veteran illustrator Ron Smith took over as artist on the story. However, the British comic industry was in decline and Wildcat failed to find an audience, being cancelled after 12 issues and merged with Eagle in March 1989. All of the strips from Wildcat were continued to some degree in Eagle, though pressures of space meant they were rotated. "Joe Alien" was one of the less lasting, occupying the slot for four weeks in May 1989 to complete the in-progress story arc. The character would however feature in three episodes of the self-contained "The Wildcat Complete" anthology, the last coming on 23 September 1989.

"Joe Alien" and the other contents of Wildcat were among the properties purchased from Fleetway owners Egmont Publishing in 2016. In 2018, Rebellion announced plans to reprint the contents of Wildcat in collected editions under their Treasury of British Comics imprint. As of 2025 only "Turbo Jones" and "Loner" have been released however, with "Joe Alien" still uncollected.

== Plot summary ==
After Turbo Jones realises Earth is doomed to destruction in 2488, the pseudonymous Joe Alien is among the successful interviewees for positions onboard his planned spacecraft Wildcat. Having seen his own planet of Xgangbe-4 destroyed, and possessing his species' combined knowledge - so vast it requires an external brain-pack, attached to his head - he has reached the same conclusion as Jones. While he is unable to offer the same financial aid to the Wildcat project as Loner and Kitten Magee, Joe's high intelligence and unusual physical attributes soon see him readily selected. After the ship launches in 2491 - shortly before Earth itself is destroyed - Joe's advanced sensors are vital in seeking out a potential new home for the Wildcat refugees; after some searching he locates one close to Earth conditions.

Joe is put in charge of exploration shuttle Wildcat Two and assigned to scout a continent designated Area 17 of the prospective new home for mankind. His team soon finds themselves under attack from the planet's sentient, carnivorous vegetation. Unable to evacuate due to a loss of contact with Wildcat, the group suffers some losses before finding an English-speaking two-headed alien which has also come under attack by the plants. The team discover that the plants are following the orders of an ancient human astronaut, lost on a mission to Mars in 2079 and found by envoys from the planet. He brokered a deal to end a civil war between the various plant lifeforms, who extended his life in response. However, the explorer has since gone mad with power and is worshipped as a god by the plants; he refuses to help Joe's team. They escape, and Joe brokers an alliance with the continent's oppressed population of giant insects, giving them chance to return to Wildcat Two and leave, later taking part in other expeditions

He grew close to his unit, and at one point tell them of how the Xgangbe were destroyed when they were attacked by the vicious race Kargroz and wiped out; as the lone survivor, Joe obliterated the entire Kargroz fleet in revenge, but found it to be little comfort and remains grateful that his brain-pack allows him to turn of his memories of his homeworld. His skills later saw him chosen to flush out an alien shapeshifter on board the Wildcat which was masquerading as child Firth Buckstead.

Along with Jones, Loner and Magee, Joe Alien was later kidnapped by an alien Gamemaster of the Glarzon race, and were forced into combat. However, the Glarzon released them after the quartet decimated the troops expected to kill them.

== Reception ==
Graham Kibble-White considered Joe Alien "dopily designed".
