= Ultimate Warrior (disambiguation) =

The Ultimate Warrior (born James Hellwig) was an American professional wrestler.

Ultimate Warrior or The Ultimate Warrior may refer to:

- The Ultimate Warrior (film), a 1975 science fiction and action-adventure film directed by Robert Clouse
- Musa (film), a South Korean film also titled The Ultimate Warrior
- Barbarian: The Ultimate Warrior, 1987 video game
- Computer Warrior, a comic strip previously named Ultimate Warrior
- "Ultimate Warrior", a title used for the champion of Raven
- Ultimate Warrior, a mixtape by rapper Starlito

== See also ==
- Jon Richardson: Ultimate Worrier, a British panel show
