= Doomlord =

British comic character

- Doomlords Vek and Zyn fighting on the cover of 25 May 1985 edition of Eagle, art by Eric Bradbury.

Character information
- First appearance: Eagle (27 March 1982)

In-story information
- Alter ego: Zyn; Vek; Enok
- Place of origin: Nox
- Partnerships: Mrs. Souster
- Notable aliases: Eric Plumrose
- Abilities: Absorption of consciousness Shape-shifting; Strength; Invulnerability; Transferral of life-force Energiser ring

Publication information
- Publisher: IPC Magazines; 1982 to 1987; Fleetway Publications; 1987 to 1989
- Schedule: Weekly
- Title(s): Eagle; 27 March to 19 June 1982; 14 August to 24 December 1982; 26 February to 2 July 1983; 24 September 1983 to 14 October 1989
- Formats: Original material for the series has been published as a strip in the comics anthology(s) Eagle.
- Genre: Science fiction
- Publication date: 27 March 1982 – 14 October 1989

Creative team
- Writer(s): Alan Grant; John Wagner and Alan Grant (Note: Credited as 'Grant Grover'.)
- Artist(s): Alberto Giolitti (Note: Credited as 'Heinzl'.); Eric Bradbury; Geoff Senior; Dave D'Antiques
- Editor(s): Dave Hunt; Terry Magee

Reprints
- Title(s): The Best of Eagle Monthly; Eagle

Doomlord is a British comic character, appearing in strips published by IPC Magazines. The character featured in British comic stories published in the weekly anthology Eagle from 27 March 1982 to 14 October 1989. The strip was initially a photo comic written by Alan Grant and John Wagner as Eagle experimented with the format. While "Doomlord" was popular with the readership, the photo stories had a more mixed reception, and from 24 September 1983 "Doomlord" turned into a conventional picture strip, with art from Eric Bradbury, and ran until October 1989. The story began with a Doomlord – a powerful alien – judging the human race's right to exist. Over the course of the strip three different Doomlords – Zyn, Vek, and Enok – acted as protagonist.

== Creation ==
Having persuaded IPC management to allow him to revive Eagle, boys adventure group editor Barrie Tomlinson settled on photo strips to make the comic stand out. Writer Alan Grant, a regular contributor to 2000 AD, also saw the potential of the format, which he was familiar with from girls' comics and Italian pornographic magazines, and created "Doomlord" with frequent writing partner John Wagner on a science fiction story in the format.

Despite some similarities, Grant denied that the character was consciously influenced by Judge Death. Tomlinson and Eagle editor Dave Hunt found the costume for the character after scouring London's theatrical and fancy dress shops., At the time, Grant and Wagner contributed so many scripts to IPC titles that managing director John Sanders requested they use pseudonyms to disguise some of their work, choosing 'Grant Grover' for "Doomlord". Grant later recalled "We had such a laugh when writing it... My abiding memories are seeing the early Doomlord scripts in photo-strip and being blown away... I guess that a rubber joke-shop mask and a set of robes made Doomlord really stand out!".

In 2005, Grant mused on the character's morality: -

His philosophy is Platonic, socialistic and fascistic at the same time – the fate of the individual is unimportant, only the fate of the species matters. This makes it right and inevitable that an elite will arise to supposedly safeguard the rights of the majority (and keep them in line). And you can see the logic in his conclusions – mankind is polluting Earth to death, we're slaughtering each other with ever bigger bombs, we're on the threshold of space travel with ships bearing nukes. Shit, if I was a Doomlord I'd be putting the kibosh on the species too.

— Alan Grant, Alan Grant Interview, Part 5, 2000 AD Review

The strip's masthead would depict Doomlord's latest victim transforming into the alien.

In 2026, Wagner said: "I think it was certainly the best thing we did for the Eagle. There were some other good things like The Thirteenth Floor ... The House of Daemon too ... But the best story we did, without a doubt, was Doomlord."

== Publishing history ==
"Doomlord" was popular with readers, and after the initial strip ended in June 1982 two sequels followed. However, the photo strips were not as popular, and turned out to be less cost-effective than initially anticipated. As of 24 September 1983, "Doomlord" returned as a standard ongoing picture strip, with art from Alberto Giolitti (under the pseudonym Heinzl). The change coincided with Wagner and Grant dissolving their writing partnership; Grant continued writing "Doomlord" solo, though Wagner later reflected "the stories were a hell of a lot of fun to write". The strip was now unrestricted by budget or special effects constraints – the first page shows Vek warping into a bird and observing a road crash from aloft. Grant later used the character's scenes with the Sousters to create a softer side he described as "surreal" and part of "his Coronation Street-type soap opera existence".

Despite the series' popularity with readers, falling sales saw it end in October 1989 as more and more of Eagle switched to reprints. Selected reprints followed until April 1990, but the strip was dropped completely for Eagle's last revamp.

In 1998, the rights to the strips created for Eagle – including "Doomlord" – were purchased from Egmont Publishing by the Dan Dare Corporation. In 2006, Hibernia Books leased the rights to the first picture strip and published them in a collected edition, called Doomlord: The Deathlords of Nox.

== Plot summary ==
Journalist Howard Harvey and policeman friend Bob Murton witness an apparent meteor falling into local woods; it in fact a spaceship bringing a sinister robed alien to Earth - Doomlord, the self-proclaimed servant of Nox, master of life and bringer of death. The alien kills Bob and knocks Harvey unconscious. Waking alone, Harvey discovers Bob alive, laughing at his friend's 'dream' – however, Bob is wearing the alien's "energiser ring". Harvey pieces together what is happening – Doomlord has the power to murder people, and absorb their memories and personality by touch. He would then disintegrate their body with the ring, and then use another alien ability – to shapeshift his form to resemble his absorbed victim, and thus impersonate them flawlessly. In this way, he can move freely amongst human society, leaving only a trail of missing persons as he abandons each identity for a new one.

Harvey attempts to stop Doomlord, but is unable to convince anyone else of the alien's existence. Doomlord also seems invulnerable; however, this does not extend to his human form and Harvey takes advantage of that to shoot him - only for Doomlord to pass his life force to another person, and then grow inside and take over as if he had absorbed them. Doomlord manipulates Harvey into a trap, and explains his "dread mission" as a "Servant of Nox" – he is to be judge, jury, and executioner on humanity's right to exist, using the identities of members of society's elite as stepping stones to gather evidence. If Doomlord judges humanity as unfit or to pose a potential risk to the interstellar community, he will destroy it – the billions of deaths being inconsequential, as "The fate of the individual is unimportant when the survival of the species is at stake." Doomlord delivers a sentence of death upon humanity. He hypnotises Harvey to accompany him to a germ warfare establishment to watch helplessly as Doomlord constructs a virus to kill humans worldwide. However, Harvey manages to overcome his hypnotism through strength of will, and stabs Doomlord. The alien infects Harvey with his life-force but the reporter sacrifices himself by releasing the virus within the sealed laboratory. Harvey's last act is to inform the dead Doomlord that humanity had the right to decide its own fate.

'Doomlord' is a generic name for one of many Servitors from the planet of Nox, who have taken upon themselves the task of species-level eugenics for the common welfare of the galaxy. The rulers of Nox - the Dread Council - notice the disappearance of Servitor Zyn on Earth, and dispatch the novice Servitor Vek (Note: Vek's name was however not revealed until the "Doomlord III" story, the Dread Council mentioning it when sending Servitor Zom to find the supposedly missing Vek.) to investigate and possibly carry out Zyn's judgement. Vek's experiences of humanity are different from his predecessor; taking the identity of commercial traveller Eric Plumrose, Vek lodges at Mrs Souster's bed and breakfast in Bradford, keeping her and her two young sons under permanent hypnosis so that he can remain in his own identity, as being in other forms saps his strength. He determines Zyn's fate and recovers his energiser ring. He concludes that humanity's problems are mostly social rather than inherent; humanity's leaders deserve the focus of blame, with the vast majority guilty of only apathy, ignorance and powerlessness. Vek petitions the Council for a review of Zyn's judgement; they give him one year to secretly influence humanity for the better, with execution to be carried out if he does not succeed.

Doomlord tries to clandestinely alter human affairs to make them pass the Servitor's judgement. Vek hypnotises the wealthy to place funds in an environmental pressure group called Alternative Earth and increases political activity amongst the general public. As time grows short, he shocks the world into nuclear disarmament by manipulating the American military into launching a nuclear strike. The Russians are able to destroy it safely and the near-miss shocks the superpowers into total nuclear disarmament. As a result, the Dread Council of Nox lifts humanity's death sentence and asks Vek to return to Nox. However, the explosion of the missile has destroyed his ship and he is forced to remain on Earth until a replacement craft can be sent.

Unfortunately, the improvements to humanity are only temporary. An Arab state launches a nuclear missile, escalating a small-scale conflict and causing the world's powers to re-arm, while Alternative Earth's funds are embezzled by its director; Vek realises that human nature may be a larger factor than he realised. The Dread Council, having lost faith in humanity's ability to keep its promises, orders Vek to carry out the death sentence on humanity. Due to the fondness of mankind that he has developed Vek disobeys, revealing his existence to humankind and taking an open stance in his attempts to manipulate humanity, pointing out the sentence of death hanging over it if it does not reform.

Doomlord grants audiences with anyone who requests one. He reacts passively to bungled attempts at assassination, coercion, and propaganda by the British Government. As a demonstration of his power he even creates a virus to destroy the small town of Prattlewell. Eventually, Vek is tranquillised whilst in human form and is kept imprisoned underground; as he requires ultraviolet light for sustenance, he starves and his corpse is triumphantly paraded as a trophy. However, he has transferred his life-force to a sympathetic scientist named Denby and lost patience with humanity, deciding to carry out the death sentence. However, Servitor Zom arrives with the task of destroying both humanity and Vek. While Zom is on the way to create a man-destroying virus, humanity once more decides to abandon nuclear weapons and Vek kills Zom to save humanity. He explains what has happened and sets himself up as humanity's protector, knowing that more Noxians would follow to slaughter humanity.

Still staying at Mrs Souster's boarding house, Vek has almost become one of the family, enjoying friendly banter with Mrs Souster and being a father-type figure to her sons Pete and Mike; however they are still hypnotised into seeing him as Eric Plumrose. The Dread Council becomes concerned at the lack of contact from Zom and contacts Vek to ask his whereabouts. Vek admits he has killed Zom to protect the human race and declares that the judgement is wrong; the Dread Council sends a trio of assassins called the Deathlords to kill him. Their combined energiser rings prove too strong for him; his ring is destroyed but the injured Vek manages to escape in the form of a dog. With the help of Mrs. West and her son Nick he is healed with a sunlamp. The Deathlords set up a shield around Bradfield to stop Vek escaping and decide to use his love of humanity to lure him out, sending hypnotic waves all over the town to force people to walk into the shield, killing them. Vek finds the energiser ring powering the shield, fending off one of the Deathlords and killing him before deactivating the shield and going on the run. Eventually, they grow tired of the chase and decide to lure him out by killing 104 humans on a motorway and sending a message to Vek that the next day they would kill 10,000 if he did not surrender. He chooses to face them at Stonehenge, killing them both. Vek keeps the Deathlord's ring, aware that other assassins will be sent. Vek appears on global television and explains the Noxian ethical code and the Deathlords, pointing out that now he is all that stands between humanity and execution, and how he had rebelled against Nox to protect them.

Shortly afterwards, Vek is taken to Nox by a fail-safe device in the Deathlords' ship when he tries to use it to rescue the Space Shuttle. He convinces the Council that the death judgement was wrong and to lift the sentence of death from Earth; however his crimes against Nox mean he is returned to Earth in exile. As protector of Earth, Vek repels the Gemini Plague, genetically engineered parasitic insects used by the robotic Populators of Pollux to wipe out a planet's higher lifeforms in advance for use as a breeding ground He also hosts "The Doomlord Show", where he would kidnap various public figures, connect them to an electrified lie detector to reveal criminal or unethical behaviour, punish criminals with political connections who could avoid conventional justice, and even respond to phoned-in personal grievances, as he can teleport directly there and employ intimidation. He also deals with the inadvertent revival of Zyn through stored tissue samples from Howard Harvey; Zyn resumes his attempts to execute humanity until Vek absorbs his life-force.

Vek decides to become a father to further his understanding of humans, particularly the emotion of love, so uses his bioengineering knowledge to artificially produce and rapidly grow a human-Noxian hybrid called Enok. Inevitably, Enok's human emotions and flaws lead him to delinquency. The Dread Council learns of Enok's existence and send the Firelords to destroy the impurity, while Enok murders Vek and wreaks havoc on Earth. Human Douglas Reeve injects himself with a stored sample of Vek's blood, thus becoming Vek. Unable to murder his own son, he abandons Enok on an asteroid.

Vek receives a Noxian lodestone to recover from a serious illness after a passionate plea by Douglas Reeve; the Sousters become aware at this point that they have Doomlord living under their roof, although the hypnotic block remains, so they still "see" Eric Plumrose. He is later manipulated into freeing the Noxian mystic Orak by Lord Kev and Lady Shal.

The galactic carnival of Tibor captures Mrs. Souster's sons to lure Vek as an exhibit. Upon their return, Vek, Pete and Mike find themselves in a parallel timeline, accidentally landing on an alternative Earth where his renegade son Enok has escaped his asteroid prison and enslaved the whole planet. Vek also fights S.M.O.G., a terrorist organisation (Note: S.M.O.G. had previously appeared in the Eagle strip Manix. Manix himself is referred to at one point during this story, and also appears briefly in flashback)

He has to undergo a psychological ordeal in the mystical Realms of Death to ensure his dedication to the Cold Blue Flame of Noxian justice. He is purged of his human emotions, becomes a Servitor once more, and returns with a burning hatred of humanity, charged with its execution, despite the fact that the Dread Council had lifted the death sentence. Fearing the result of the ordeal, Vek had previously brought Enok back to Earth and had placed him in his final growth cycle, correctly gambling that this would mature Enok and foster a love of Earth. Enok now protects humanity, whilst Vek wishes to destroy it. Vek has been given a new energiser ring which allows him to both animate objects (such as getting a chimney to fight for him) and travel through time, resulting in him destroying the advanced prehistoric civilisation of Atlantis. When Vek returns he easily killsEnok, but the Souster boys eat his blood as Vek torments the Earth; the older brother Pete manages to return as Enok and faces Vek in combat. Their energisers interact to render Vek permanently intangible, whereupon he retreats into hiding inside a mountain.

Enok finds himself continuing in Vek's role as Earth's now unwanted and resented protector, fighting a pollution monster, alien mind parasites, and a created by the siphoning off of part of his life-force. During the same period, the younger Souster boy Mike also becomes Enok, but with unexplained vampiric qualities. The first Enok is killed fighting the rival superhero that had been possessed by the mind parasites, leaving the second Enok undecided as to whether to protect humanity or feast upon it.

== Collected editions ==
| Title | ISBN | Publisher | Release date | Contents |
|---|---|---|---|---|
| Doomlord: The Deathlords of Nox | [ISBN unspecified] | Hibernia Books | 2006 | Material from Eagle 24 September 1983 to 3 March 1984 |
| Doomlord Volume One: Zyn | [ISBN unspecified] | Hibernia Books | 2026 | Material from Eagle issues 1-13 (27th March - 19th June 1982) |
| Doomlord Volume Two (TBC) | [ISBN unspecified] | Hibernia Books | 2027 | |
