= Eagle (British comics) =

Seminal British children's comic

- The front cover of the first issue of Eagle, with artwork by Frank Hampson. Advances in printing technology offered a substantial improvement on the original issue's faded colours. The logo was modelled on the top of a large brass inkwell owned by Marcus Morris, the comic's founder, and typography was by Berthold Wolpe, designer of the Tempest font.

Publication information
- Publisher: Hulton Press; IPC Magazines
- Schedule: Weekly
- Format: Ongoing
- Genre: Science fiction, adventure
- Publication date: 14 April 1950 to 26 April 1969; 27 March 1982 to 1994
- No. of issues: 991 (or 987) (original); 505 (new)
- Main character(s): Dan Dare, Harris Tweed, Luck of the Legion, Doomlord

Creative team
- Written by: Frank Hampson; Chad Varah
- Artists: Frank Hampson; Frank Bellamy; Keith Watson; Don Harley; Bruce Cornwell

Eagle was a British children's comics periodical, first published from 1950 to 1969, and then in a relaunched format from 1982 to 1994. It was founded by Marcus Morris, an Anglican vicar from Lancashire. Morris edited a Southport parish magazine called The Anvil, but felt that the church was not communicating its message effectively. Simultaneously disillusioned with contemporary children's literature, he and Anvil artist Frank Hampson created a dummy comic based on Christian values. Morris proposed the idea to several Fleet Street publishers, with little success, until Hulton Press took it on.

Following a huge publicity campaign, the first issue of Eagle was released in April 1950. Revolutionary in its presentation and content, it was enormously successful; the first issue sold about 900,000 copies. Featured in colour on the front cover was its most recognisable story, Dan Dare, Pilot of the Future, created by Hampson with meticulous attention to detail. Other popular stories included Riders of the Range and P.C. 49. Eagle also contained news and sport sections, and educational cutaway diagrams of sophisticated machinery. A members club was created, and a range of related merchandise was licensed for sale.

Amidst a takeover of the periodical's publisher and a series of acrimonious disputes, Morris left in 1959; Hampson followed shortly thereafter. Although Eagle continued in various forms, a perceived lowering of editorial standards preceded plummeting sales, and it was eventually subsumed by its rival, Lion, in 1969. Eagle was relaunched in 1982 and ran for over 500 issues before being dropped by its publisher in 1994.

== History ==
=== Background ===
Eagle was founded by John Marcus Harston Morris (1915–1989). Morris was born in the Lancashire town of Preston, and in 1918 moved to Southport. He graduated from Brasenose College, Oxford with a second-class degree in Literae Humaniores, and at Wycliffe Hall, Oxford gained a second in theology in 1939. He became a Church of England priest the following year, and served as a chaplain in the Royal Air Force Volunteer Reserve from 1941 to 1943.

In 1945 he became vicar of St James' Church in Birkdale. Morris had long felt that the Anglican church was not publicising its message effectively enough; four years earlier he had written an unpublished article, intended for the Yarmouth Mercury and entitled Christian Hypocrisy, in which he questioned the difference that the Christian church had made to society in general. (Note: Morris's Canon had asked him not to publish it, and Morris had complied.) Morris also felt that the church was completely out of touch with the people whom it was supposed to represent. He gradually expanded the parish magazine—printed on four pages of cheap paper— into The Anvil, a widely circulated Christian magazine based on the humour and arts magazine Lilliput. Morris managed to employ several notable contributors on Anvil, such as C. S. Lewis and Harold Macmillan.

In 1948 he employed young artist Frank Hampson, a war veteran (Note: As a teenager Hampson had taught himself how to draw, and had enrolled at art school in 1938. He was called up for war service in 1939, and in 1940 was evacuated from Dunkirk during Operation Dynamo.) who had enrolled at the Southport School of Arts and Crafts, where he was described by his tutor as an "outstanding draughtsman 'prepared to go to endless trouble to get a thing right'". He worked as the illustrator on Anvil, and later became the full-time artist for Interim, a Christian publicity society formed during a conference of diocesan editors, with ambitions to produce a strip cartoon magazine aimed at children.

Children's comics such as The Rover, The Hotspur, Schoolgirls' Own, The Magnet and Adventure usually contained a mixture of adventure stories, presented as text rather than strip cartoons, and some British boys were buying American horror comics produced for G.I.s. Morris was impressed by the high standard of artwork in the US magazines, but disgusted by their content, which he described as "deplorable, nastily over-violent and obscene, often with undue emphasis on the supernatural and magical as a way of solving problems". He realised that a market existed for a children's comics periodical which featured action stories in cartoon form, but which also would convey to children the standards and morals he advocated.

Morris was instrumental in launching the short-lived Society for Christian Publicity, formed to take control of The Anvil and to perhaps produce further Christian publications, and in January 1949 the Daily Mirror published an optimistic piece about the rumoured publication by the Society of a "new children's comic". This intrigued local journalist Norman Price, and the following month he met Morris, and helped him express his desire to see such a magazine by co-writing with him "comics that bring horror to the nursery", published in the Sunday Dispatch. Morris's article provoked a strong reaction from its readers; letters of support flooded into his home.

Morris envisioned a character called Lex Christian, "a tough, fighting parson in the slums of the East End of London", whose adventures would be told in strip cartoon form, illustrated by Hampson. The idea gained the support of Terence Horsley, editor of the Sunday Empire News, but Horsley was killed in a gliding accident shortly thereafter. Morris suggested to Hampson that they instead create an entirely new children's publication. Hampson was enthusiastic about the idea, and in May that year the two began work on a dummy of it. Lex Christian became Chaplain Dan Dare of the Inter-Planet Patrol, and featured on the cover. On the inside, two pages of Secret City featured a character named Jimmy Swift, and on the back page was a religious story about Saint Paul. Short strips included Joe from Strawberry Farm and Ernie, Always Unlucky. Other features included Morris's Editor's Letter and a range of news articles. Three photocopies of the dummy were made, each hand-coloured by Hampson.

It is a magazine with 175 flawlessly vivid drawings that start with gangsters shooting a girl in the stomach, having the heroine twice bound and gagged, finally dumped in a bath of cold water to drown ... Horror has crept into the British nursery. Morals of little girls in plaits and boys with marbles bulging their pockets are being corrupted by a torrent of indecent coloured magazines that are flooding bookstalls and newsagents.

— Marcus Morris and Norman Price, writing in the Sunday Dispatch, 13 February 1949

By then deeply in debt from the publication of The Anvil and the production costs of the dummy, Morris formed Anvil Productions Ltd. Its prospectus declared: "The Company proposes to publish a new children's coloured 'comic' paper, which will be of a much higher and more mature quality than anything published in England and in appearance and format will be modelled more on the American comic papers which are so far in advance of our own". Initially he sought to keep the project under his control, but his escalating debts forced him to try to sell the idea. To that end, he made several trips to London, where—armed with the dummy—he pitched his idea to several Fleet Street publishers. He met John Myers at Hulton Press, who referred him to Montague Haydon at Amalgamated Press. He then met Neville Pearson at George Newnes, Ltd., whose executives claimed that the publication was "not an economic proposition". The US comics reprinter Boardmans was next, followed by Mike Wardell of the Sporting Record. Neither The Times nor The Daily Telegraph were interested, and at The Sunday Times the personal assistant to Gomer Berry, 1st Viscount Kemsley, presumed that Morris was asking for a charitable donation. In autumn 1949 however, Hulton Press contacted Morris with the instruction "definitely interested do not approach any other publisher".

=== 1950–1969 ===
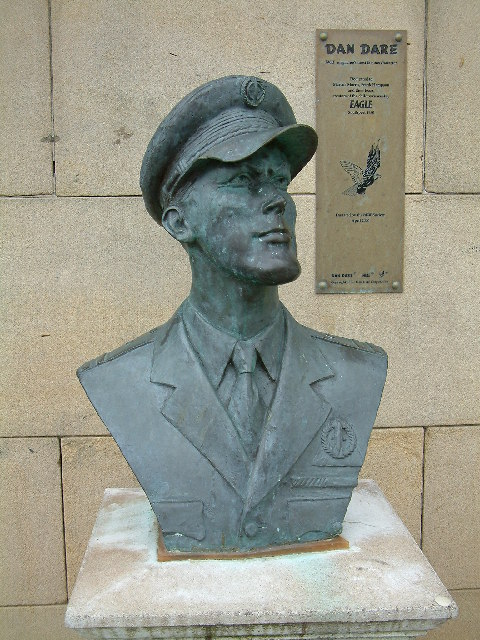
Bust of Dan Dare in Southport

In October that year Morris sold The Anvil—by then selling about 3,560 copies monthly—for £1,250, plus a £200 annual contract to continue as editor. (Note: The Anvil was last published in September 1950, by which time its production costs had forced its new owners to cease production.) Morris wanted to produce a comic the pages of which would be filled with role models whose behaviour and moral outlook he felt was socially desirable. Foreigners would not be depicted as either enemies or villains, and at least one child in any group of children would be from an ethnic minority. Religious values would not be imposed upon the reader, although their underlying moral tones would be made obvious on each page. These were innovative but somewhat risky ideas, as nothing similar existed in the market, (Note: Publishers had for decades kept largely to the same format, which typically concentrated on a contemporary figure involved in some unfortunate event, who then emerged unscathed, as a hero.) and Hulton therefore commissioned extensive research into the new comic, which by then, inspired by the design of her church lectern, had been christened Eagle by Hampson's wife. Layout and typography were designed by Morris's friend, Ruari McLean, assisted by Charles Green, and faced with an initial print run of 1 million copies, Aintree printer Eric Bemrose designed and built a new ten-unit rotogravure machine in about twelve weeks.

The comic was heavily publicised before its release; copies were mailed direct to several hundred thousand people who worked with children, and a "Hunt the Eagle" scheme was launched, whereby large papier-mâché golden eagles were set on top of several Humber Hawk cars, and toured across the UK. Those who spotted an eagle were offered tokens worth 3d, which could be exchanged at newsagents for a free copy of Eagle.

Despite its relatively high price, the comic was an immediate success; released on 14 April 1950, and despite government paper quotas, (Note: Eagle managed to avoid the problems caused by the countrywide paper shortage, by absorbing the quotas of other publications.) the first issue sold about 900,000 copies. Eight of its (Note: First issue) twenty pages were presented in four-colour rotogravure. Eagle was designed to entertain and educate its readers; although a typical issue might contain such characters as Cavendish Brown, Harris Tweed, Jack O'Lantern, Storm Nelson and Luck of the Legion, it also included a special news section, a sports page, and school stories. Each issue also featured a centre-spread full-colour cutaway illustration of a piece of machinery—the first detailed the inner workings of the British Rail 18000 locomotive. Such high quality strips as Riders of the Range and P.C. 49 helped ensure a weekly circulation of almost a million copies, but it was the adventures of Dan Dare, Pilot of the Future, which most captivated readers. Created by Hampson—now a full-time staff artist with his own team—Dan Dare was the UK's first science-fiction comic strip of any significance. Readers were thrilled by the square-jawed British spaceman's weekly exploits, and his struggles with The Mekon. (Note: The character of Dare is described by author Ann Lawson Lucas as embodying "many of the qualities associated with the male hero of nineteenth-century boys' adventure stories, while displaying others which arise from the ideological discourses of postwar Britain". Authors Dudley Jones and Tony Watkins describe Dare as being part of the "'powerful sense of beleaguered hope' that characterised not only the campaign against horror comics but other aspects of British post-war culture".)

I wanted to give hope for the future, to show that rockets, and science in general, could reveal new worlds, new opportunities. I was sure that space travel would be a reality.

— Frank Hampson

While Morris (who by now had resigned from St James) edited the magazine from Hulton's premises at Shoe Lane in London, the comic was created in a converted bakery in the Churchtown district of Southport. The building was described by Eagle artist Greta Tomlinson as "very basic, a flagstone floor and a tin roof; there was cold running water in the corner. It was freezing cold in the winter and boiling hot in the summer". Working to a tight schedule, Hampson created each Dan Dare episode first in pencil, and then in ink and colour. He and his team of artists posed for photographs, in the positions drawn in his pencil sketches (Hampson usually posed for Dan Dare). These photographs were combined with the rough sketches, and his colleagues then worked on the strip while he tackled the opening frame of each week's story. His drawings of the technology Dan Dare employed were meticulous, and were based on a large body of research and reference material, as well as space ship models, plaster heads, mocked-up space suits, and a complete model of a space station. He also wrote the dialogue for several of the comic's pages. Hampson was assisted in his work by expert consultants, among them Arthur C. Clarke (then an aspiring young science fiction writer). Scriptwriters included Anglican priest Chad Varah (founder of Samaritans). Varah also accompanied Morris on tours of Cathedrals often filled with Eagle readers keen to meet the comic's creators. Peter Ling and Macdonald Hastings were contributors, as was Harris Tweed's creator John Ryan, who was also responsible for Captain Pugwash, printed in the first 19 issues.

Children were encouraged to submit their good deeds to the comic; those that had their stories printed were called MUGs, a not-so-subtle dig at the "spivs" who made fun of them. The best of these stories were awarded the title of "MUG of the Month", or "MUG of the Year". Readers were also invited to join an Eagle club. Upon payment of a subscription, members would be given a gilt Eagle badge, a rulebook, and a list of privileges. The club proved extremely popular, attracting within months a membership of about 100,000, but it also served as a research tool for Hulton; questionnaires were sent to a random selection of members, asking each to rate certain aspects of the comic. Eagle's production costs were funded partly by advertising revenue, although advertisers were required to integrate their designs so as to match the comic's high standards. Another of Hampson's strips, Tommy Walls, was the first commercial cartoon in any comic, and an obvious advertisement for Wall's ice cream. Eagle also spawned a large range of merchandise, which included toothpaste, pyjamas, and toy ray guns. Several annuals were printed; the first was announced in a September 1951 issue, in Morris's regular letter to his readers. (Note: Eagle Annuals 1 to 9 carried a large black eagle printed on a bold red cover, but from 1961 photographs or illustrations were used instead. Production of Eagle Annual ceased after 1975, but restarted in 1983. The last was printed in 1992.)

Eagle became immensely popular with people of all ages and walks of life. Copies brought into school regularly found their way into the hands of staff, who enjoyed them almost as much as the children they taught. The Lancet reported on one doctor who read Eagle on his rounds. It was sent to soldiers in Korea, to refugee camps, and was praised by Geoffrey Grigson on the BBC Home Service. Wolf Mankowitz proclaimed Dan Dare a "Hero of Our Time", and the Earl of Jellicoe was reported to have read the comic in the library of Westminster Palace. Lord Mountbatten supposedly placed a subscription order for his nephew, Prince Charles, and on one occasion rang Hulton to complain that the comic had not arrived; a replacement was quickly despatched. Years later Morris sent the prince a copy of The Best of Eagle (1977); Charles replied and thanked him for the "fond memories". The comic was not universally popular, however, as it was quickly banned in South Africa.

I am sure that the success of Eagle (a sell-out of 900,000 copies of its first issue) was due to the insistance [sic] on quality. Where Eagle was concerned, the quality of the paper, printing, artwork and writing set a new standard. There were bright colours, well-drawn pictures and exciting stories. Technically, the Eagle strips marked an advance on the standards of that time (standards that had stood still for years) when most strips were not true strips but merely pictures with captions underneath.

— Marcus Morris (1977)

Despite settling some of his debts, Morris once again found himself in financial trouble, with unexpected tax bills and arguments with Hulton over payments. In 1955 he sold the copyright of his signature to Hulton for £7,250 (a portion of which was a loan). 45% of his £5,000 per annum salary was paid to the taxman. With only one other profit-making magazine (Farmers Weekly), Hulton sought to curb Eagle's costs, complaining about the use of taxis, expensive stationery, electricity and telephone bills, restaurant bills, and staff expenses. At their 1957 AGM Hulton's Chairman reported a fall in profits, from £298,000 to £36,000, blaming reduced revenue from another of their magazines, Picture Post, and increased production costs. Several of Morris's friends later left the company, and following a short period of internal turmoil Morris gave up the editor's chair in 1959. The following year Eagle was taken over by Odhams Press. Hampson's studio (by then in Epsom) was disbanded, and following creative differences he retired from the comic. (Note: Sources disagree on the precise date on which Hampson left the comic, and therefore this article remains ambiguous on the subject.) His duties on Dan Dare were taken up by Frank Bellamy, (Note: Bellamy's first front page Dan Dare work appeared, unsigned, on 29 August 1959. His first signed front page work appeared on 3 October that year.) described by Morris as "a most fastidious artist and scrupulous draftsman, and like Hampson at his best, often consumed with anxiety". With Keith Watson and Don Harley, the three worked from a studio in Fleet Street. The front cover was redesigned, the Eagle name appearing across the top of the page rather than in one corner, coinciding with a new-look Dare. Many readers found Bellamy's changes to Dare (made at the behest of Eagle's publisher) objectionable. Bellamy was succeeded by Harley, who in 1962 was followed by Watson, who had returned from a short stint working on Eagle's rival, Lion. Watson stopped drawing Dan Dare in 1967, and was succeeded by Bruce Cornwell. Following Hampson's departure, the emphasis on Dan Dare's exploration of the Solar System had changed instead to include interstellar travel. Continuity became strained, and production on Dan Dare ceased in 1967, when it was replaced by reprints from earlier editions.

Eagle continued to be published through the 1960s, under a succession of editors (Morris was succeeded by his deputy, Clifford Makins). Regular changes in emphasis, including an increasing number of features on contemporary music and sport, were not enough to ensure the comic's continued survival. Although in 1961 its circulation was still about 500,000, under IPC, then Eagle's owners, (Note: Hulton Press was renamed Longacre Press, after being taken over in 1960 by Odhams Press, which itself was bought soon after by the Daily Mirror Group (now IPC).) the comic suffered a drastic fall in quality. The centre spreads were replaced with the historically inaccurate "Last of The Saxon Kings", and letters of complaint poured in to the comic. Within months the comic's circulation fell to 150,000, and continued to drop. By 1966 it was in decline. IPC continued production until the comic's last issue, on 26 April 1969, by which time circulation had dwindled to an unprofitable 40,000. Just short of its 1,000th edition, the comic was merged with its rival, IPC's Lion.

Eric Meredith from Chester was employed as technical adviser by the Eagle Comic as the 'Man from Eagle' who undertook daring stunts and wrote about his experiences in the comic.

=== 1982–1994 ===
The front cover of an early issue of the relaunched Eagle

A modified Dan Dare was briefly featured in IPC Media's 2000 AD (1977–1979). The public reaction to this, along with news of a planned television series, persuaded IPC's comic arm Fleetway to relaunch Eagle in 1982, as a weekly comic edited by Dave Hunt. The first issue was dated 27 March 1982.

The original Dan Dare was no longer a feature of the comic, his eponymous great-great grandson taking on the mantle of space explorer instead. Drawn by Gerry Embleton, and later Ian Kennedy, and set 200 years after the original story, the first story-arc featured the return of Dan Dare's earliest nemesis, The Mekon. IPC were unable to recreate the popularity of the original strip, and in 1989 the original Dan Dare returned to the comic, in a six-part story illustrated by original Eagle artist Keith Watson.

In an attempt to emulate the success that Fleetway had had with girls' magazines, the relaunched Eagle initially contained a large number of photo stories such as Doomlord, Sgt. Streetwise, Manix and Walk or Die, but this style was soon replaced by the more traditional comic-strip format. Other stories included Bloodfang, The House of Daemon, Computer Warrior and Detective ZED.

Along with IPC's entire comics line, Eagle was sold to Robert Maxwell in 1987. Although not as successful as its predecessor, over 500 issues were published. A change to a monthly anthology caused by falling sales was a portent of the comic's future. For much of its existence, issues contained reprints of earlier work, including reprints of stories from other comics, such as M.A.C.H. 1 from 2000 AD and Charley's War from Battle. There were also new Dan Dare stories written by Tom Tully and illustrated by David Pugh. The relaunched Eagle was dropped in 1994.

=== Mergers with other comics ===
In the twentieth century it was standard practice in the British comics industry to merge a comic into another one when it declined in sales. Typically, a few stories from the cancelled comic would continue for a while in the surviving comic, and both titles would appear on the cover (one in a smaller font than the other) until the title of the cancelled comic was eventually dropped. In this way, two comics were merged with the original Eagle, Swift in 1963 and Boys' World in 1964, before the Eagle itself came to an end when it was merged with Lion in 1969.

Lion was merged with Valiant in 1974, Valiant in turn was merged with Battle Picture Weekly in 1976, and finally Battle was merged into the revived Eagle in 1988. In a sense, the new Eagle was descended from the old.

The new Eagle also consumed Scream! in 1984, Tiger in 1985, M.A.S.K. in 1988 and Wildcat in 1989. The story "The Thirteenth Floor" from Scream! continued in the Eagle until 1987, and its lead character, Max, purported to be the comic's editor for several years after the story finished (starting in #159).

== Legacy ==
I didn't want to produce a strip without a female. In a way I struck a blow for Women's Lib! She [Peabody] was shown as a very clever, attractive young lady. It also paved the way for a few arguments between her and Sir Hubert in the first story—a nice human touch ... she was just a very normal, efficient, competent girl.

— Frank Hampson (1974)

Eagle inspired several imitators, such as Valiant, Tiger, and Lion (which featured a Dan Dare clone, "Captain Condor") but such adventure tales were less palatable for girls. Female characters like Dan Dare's Professor Peabody (one of only two female main characters in the strip), were generally given less important roles than the men, and as a result a trend developed toward producing comics aimed specifically at either boys or girls. Girl, a sister title to Eagle, appeared in November 1951, and featured youthful capers in boarding schools, and tales of equestrian adventure. Later comics such as Jackie, descended from contemporary women's magazines, were more cosmopolitan in flavour. Girl was followed in 1953 by Robin, which was aimed at younger children, and in March 1954 by Swift, for older readers than Robin but younger than Eagle or Girl.

The popularity of comics which depicted war faded after the end of the Second World War, and Eagle's previously unheard-of circulation figures helped define the content of most comics produced during the 1950s, including war. In contrast to other, earlier publications, Eagle attempted to educate the reader with factual, text-based historical stories, such as the life of Winston Churchill, as presented in "The Happy Warrior". A detailed account of the Second World War was given, while one strip lambasted German paratroopers, who on seeing British infantry below them, shouted "Donner und Blitzen! Der Englander!" During the mid-1950s however, comics began sensationalising their covers with war imagery, and Eagle followed suit in the 1960s.

Morris went on to become editorial director of the National Magazine Company, and later its managing director and editor-in-chief. He launched Cosmopolitan in the UK, and with Condé Nast he formed COMAG, one of the UK's largest media distribution companies. He was appointed OBE in 1983, retired the following year, and died in March 1989. Despite his later work however, he is best remembered as the founder of Eagle. His memorial service at St Bride's Church in Fleet Street was filled to overflowing.

... if a character's popularity can be assessed by the amount of merchandising they attract then there can be no doubt that during the 1950s Dan Dare was far and away the most popular character going.

Hampson was embittered by his departure from Eagle. Although he created Dan Dare, he and Morris had signed contracts which made the space adventurer the copyright of its publisher. (Note: According to Morris's biography, at the time he was heavily indebted. Having his debts paid off was what most concerned him, and the matter of copyright was given no real attention.) This made it difficult for him to get hold of his original artwork, and excluded him from any profits Hulton made from the huge range of Dan Dare and Eagle merchandise it licensed. He called Odhams, the comic's owner after 1960, "Treens". Hampson later worked on various advertising commissions, and illustrated seven Ladybird books. He recovered from cancer to become a graphics technician at Ewell Technical College, and in 1975 at the Lucca comics convention was declared as the best writer and illustrator of strip cartoons since the end of the Second World War. At the 1976 Comics 101 British comics convention he was given the Ally Sloper Award, as the best British strip cartoon artist. He died at Epsom in July 1985. His original Dan Dare drawings now command high prices, and have inspired a range of modern artists.

Gerald Scarfe and David Hockney were first published in Eagle. X-Men comic scriptwriter Chris Claremont read and enjoyed Eagle, and cites Hampson's work as influential on his career. Watchmen co-creator Dave Gibbons has also praised Hampson's work, and the lyricist Tim Rice, in his foreword to Living with Eagles (1998), cites the stories printed in Eagle as helping "me in my story-telling efforts through musicals many years on". Professor Stephen Hawking, when asked about the influence Dan Dare had on him, replied: "Why am I in cosmology?", and the entertainer Kenny Everett chose an Eagle Annual as his book on Desert Island Discs.

The comic industry's Eagle Awards, first presented in 1977, are named after Eagle, and a fan club, the Eagle Society, regularly publishes the quarterly Eagle Times.

== Related publications ==
- Beardmore, George (1958). Jack O' Lantern and the Fighting Cock. Hulton Press.
- Bond, Geoffrey (1958). Luck of the Legion's Desert Adventure. Hulton Press.
- Bond, Geoffrey (1956). Luck of the Legion's Secret mission. Hulton Press.
- Dawson, Basil (1956). Dan Dare on Mars. Hulton Press.
- Ling, Peter (1957). The Three J's and the Pride of Northbrook. Hulton Press.
- Trice, Edward (1957). Storm Nelson and the Sea Leopard. Hulton Press.
