= John Cooper (artist) =

British comics artist

John Cooper (1942 – 22 February 2015) was a British comics artist.

Cooper was born in Featherstone, West Yorkshire, in 1942. In 1963 he became a freelance artist, and illustrated the comic strips "Captain Scarlet", "Thunderbirds" and "Secret Agent 21" for TV Century 21. In 1975 he co-created "One-Eyed Jack" for Valiant, with writer John Wagner. He later became the regular artist on "Johnny Red" for Battle Picture Weekly, drawing over 300 episodes, as well as "Action Force" and "Dredger" for the same title. For 2000 AD he drew "Judge Dredd," "M.A.C.H. 1", Alan Moore's "Abelard Snazz" and some "Future Shocks". He also worked on Starlord, Eagle, Scream!, Marvel UK, Roy of the Rovers, Warlord, the Judge Dredd Megazine and Private Eye.

As well as his work on comics, he also painted detailed maritime scenes by private commission, and did some work as a courtroom artist.

He was married twice, and had two children from his first marriage.
