= David Pugh (comics) =

British comics artist

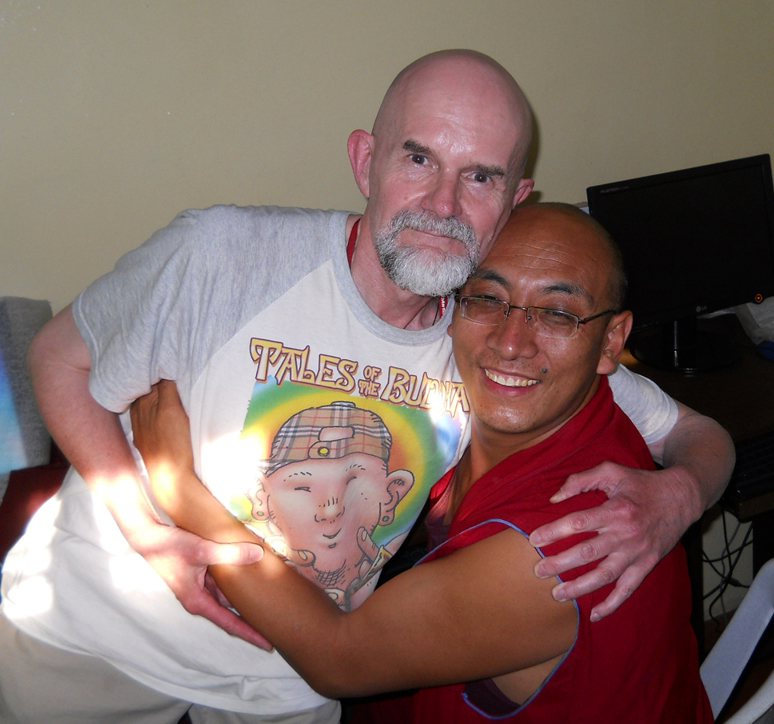
- Areas: Writer, Artist, Letterer, Colourist
- Notable works: Sláine
- Collaborators: Pat Mills

David Pugh is a British comics artist best known for his work on Sláine at 2000 AD.

== Early life and career ==
Pugh attended Art College at Brighton and Kingston upon Thames. On leaving, he joined the American company Pier 1 Imports, as a company artist and photographer, he worked with the London-based advertising agency Brockie, Haslam and Allen. After two years he returned to Wales, to work for the Thomson Organization as a visualizer in various advertising and promotional departments. His first published comic strip was "Looking Glass Library" in the Thomson weekly newspaper the Merthyr Express in 1976. In 1979, he also created Captain Classified: Star Ranger for the weekly Glamorgan Star, it was this work that brought him to the attention of Pat Mills and the beginning of his professional comics career.

== Comics ==
Pugh began drawing Sláine for 2000 AD in 1984, helping to remold the character into his current incarnation and create the look of the longtime villain, Elfric. His work on "Time Killer" and "Tomb of Terror" has been reprinted several times and is still available in various collected editions. He became one of the top artists in Boys' Adventure comics for Fleetway, visualising Peter Milligan scripts for MASK comics. His personal favorite character was Loner, the black space gunslinger, especially created for him to showcase his talent in the Sci-Fi weekly, Wildcat.

When Wildcat merged with the Eagle comic, Pugh handed Loner over to Eric Bradbury and took on the challenge of reinventing his own childhood hero, Dan Dare. David was fortunate to alternate with Keith Watson from the original Frank Hampson studio. Together they recreated Dare into an eighties action hero, retaining the look of the original character but heavily influenced by movies such as Alien and Predator. Work followed for AC Comics and Tekno Comix in the USA, the most successful work being on Neil Gaiman's Phage: Shadowdeath, written by Bryan Talbot. David wrote and drew a regular sci-fi strip and designed many spacecraft for Games Workshop. Obvious Tactics the graphic novel for Black Library has been reprinted twice and is available as a free download. For eleven years he provided the colour and 3D computer effects for the Scorer’s football strip in the Daily Mirror.

== Creative work outside comics ==
Pugh has also been a design consultant for Holiday World International Travel and Oberland Holidays since 1979. This work helped fund his travels, taking him into the homes of many deprived families and becoming long term friends with many of them.

He has created many adventure books featuring Disney and SEGA characters and illustrated a series of educational books for Belitha Press. Pugh has been commissioned to work on several 3D art projects including a campaign for Renault cars and has collaborated on a 3D children's book The Boy who Walked on the Ceiling, with his friend Jon Haward, written and created by Doug Moench.

David Pugh is now a published author; his first novel Dharma Sutra is published by Austin Macauley. "A romance to help you find your true self and spirituality by having lots of sex."

Sylvia Dharma has a holiday romance with Remus Jallow, a West African palm tapper, and moves to The Gambia. She becomes involved with a Botswana hitman to take on the dangerous Bob Jatta, a sexually dysfunctional human trafficker whom she has publicly offended. Her estranged husband, Jeffrey, goes to India and finds love in the Tibetan community of Dharamsala. He forms a cult of sexual self-realization with Sylvia’s former lover, Remus. The two are joined by a Japanese adult video star and her grown-up aborted daughter. Guidance comes from a beer-loving Jesus with a little help from Jagannath, Lord of the Universe, and the words of Leonard Cohen.

== Other works ==
He is now the founder of Bus Fare, a charity set up to help migrant workers and refugees reunite with their families. Currently living in India, he is alternating between working as designer and computer graphics teacher for the LHA Charitable Trust, working with Tibetan refugees in Dharamsala and helping a street children project in Rishikesh. His friends, Bhuwan Chandra and Kamal Chandra are helping to put fifteen girls through full-time education and giving free daily music and yoga classes to around thirty other children. Their project is funded by giving music and yoga lessons to foreign visitors, who are encouraged to also work with the children.

Bus Fare is currently working to help a migrant worker in the Gambia keep in touch with his family in Guinea Bissau. David is helping to develop home stays in the isolated forest village of Cassalol in Guinea Bissau.

== Bibliography ==
Comics work includes:

=== Writer ===
- Looking Glass Library (1977)
- Captain Classified (1979–1981)
- Tharg's Future Shocks: "Ten" (script and art, in 2000 AD No. 480, 1986)
- Where's Sonic Now? (1993)
- The Last Planet (with co-writer Simon Davies, 1993)
- Warhammer 40,000: Obvious Tactics (script and art, Black Library, 1997, ISBN 1-84154-147-8)

=== Artist ===
- Looking Glass Library (1977)
- Captain Classified (1979–81)
- 2000 AD (1984–86):
  - Blood Sport (with Jamie Delano, in 2000 AD #484, August 1986)
  - Slaine (with Pat Mills):
    - "The Time Killer" (in 2000 AD #413–418, 422–426 and 433–434, 1985, collected in Time Killer, Rebellion Developments, 2007, ISBN 1-905437-21-8)
    - "The Tomb of Terror" (with Glenn Fabry and David Pugh, in 2000 AD #449–457, 461, December 1985 – March 1986, collected in Slaine the King, 2008, ISBN 978-1-905437-66-5)
- Mask (1986–88)
- Wildcat (1989)
- Eagle (1989–1994)
- Garbage Man (with Alan Grant, in Toxic! #27–29, September–October 1991)
- Sonic Adventure Books (1992–93)
- The Last Planet (1993)
- Disney Gargoyles (1995)
- Neil Gaiman's Phage: Shadow Death (pencils, with writer Bryan Talbot and inks by Tim Perkins, 6-issue limited series, Tekno Comix, June–November 1996)
- Star Wars: Galactic Search (1997)
- Obvious Tactics (Black Library, 1997)
- Warhammer Monthly (1998)
- The Worm (1999)
- Cape and Mask (2003)
- Eternal Damnation (96 pages, Black Library, 2003, ISBN 1-84416-029-7, also in Flames of Damnation, 224 pages, 2005, ISBN 1-84416-253-2 ) includes:
  - "Zero Option" (with Dan Abnett)
  - "Predator & Prey" (with Gordon Rennie)

=== Letterer ===
- Deff Skwadron (2004)
- Eternal Damnation (2003)
- Kal Jerico (2000)
- Tales From The Ten-Tailed Cat (2002)
- Warhammer Monthly (1998)

=== Covers ===
- Eagle (1989–1994)
- Dan Dare Annual (1991)
- RoboCop Annual (1996)
- Masked Rider Annual (1997)
