= Manix =

Cartoon strip series in the Eagle comic

Manix was both the title and main character of a comic strip serial published in the British comics anthology Eagle. The serial first appeared in issue 24 (dated September 4, 1982).

The serial was created by Alan Grant and John Wagner, who scripted the early story arcs. The strip was subsequently written by Grant using the pseudonym "Keith Law", and later by Scott Goodall.

The early adventures, like most of the serials published in Eagle at the time, were fumetti: illustrated by black-and-white photographs using actors, with text boxes and speech balloons superimposed. The photography for Manix was by Sven Arnstein. When Eagle ceased to publish fumettis and moved to a traditionally illustrated format in 1983, the art for the Manix strip was provided by Manuel Carmona.
