= Eagle (1982 comic) =

British comic

- The cover of the 27 March 1982 edition of Eagle, the first of the relaunched series. Art by Gerry Embleton.

Publication information
- Publisher: IPC Magazines; 1982 to 1987; Fleetway Publications; 1987 to 1994
- Schedule: Weekly; 27 March 1982 to 6 April 1991; Monthly; May 1991 to January 1994
- Format: Ongoing series
- Genre: Action/adventure
- Publication date: 27 March 1982 – January 1994
- No. of issues: 505
- Main character(s): Dan Dare; Doomlord; Max

Creative team
- Written by: Alan Grant; Pat Mills; Tom Tully; John Wagner
- Artist(s): Eric Bradbury; Mike Dorey; Gerry Embleton; Ian Kennedy; José Ortiz; Vanyo
- Editor(s): Dave Hunt; Terry Magee; Barrie Tomlinson

Eagle, sometimes referred to as The New Eagle and known at various points in its life as Eagle and Scream!, Eagle and Tiger, Eagle and Battle, Eagle and M.A.S.K. and Eagle and Wildcat, was a British boys' adventure comic published by IPC Magazines from 27 March 1982 to January 1994. (Note: The cover date was actually the last day on which the issue was on sale, so the issue would have been published the previous Monday) A revival of the famous Eagle, the title was initially a weekly publication until turning into a monthly in May 1991. The title was finally cancelled in January 1994, after 505 issues.

Like the original Eagle, the comic's lead feature was Dan Dare; other long-running stories included "Doomlord" and "Computer Warrior". While the comic was successful on its own terms as the British comic market contracted heavily in the 1980s and 1990s, it never matched the commercial or critical success of its illustrious predecessor.

== Creation ==
Originally launched in 1950 by Reverend Marcus Morris as a reaction to the controversial importation of American horror comics (a genre which would be outright banned by British parliament in the Children and Young Persons (Harmful Publications) Act 1955), the original Eagle had changed the face of British comics in the decade following its launch, with a peak circulation of a million copies and a readership which included the future Charles III. However, a mixture of competition from the likes of Amalgamated Press and DC Thomson, which eroded sales, and financial problems saw Morris and original publisher Hulton Press selling Eagle to Odhams Press. Sales continued to fall, leading to a series of cost-cutting measures – including the controversial replacement of Frank Hampson's art studio with less costly alternatives. Odhams' parent company, the Mirror Group, purchased Amalgamated Press and reorganised its magazine division into Fleetway Publications. While Eagle continued publication its circulation began to fall, while criticism of its increasingly generic content increased. In 1969, another takeover saw Odhams and Fleetway combined into IPC Magazines, which was left with a huge portfolio of titles, and decided to trim a number of underperformers. With sales of Eagle down to 40,000, the comic went through the indignity of being folded into Lion – one of several titles which had been created as a competitor.

Barrie Tomlinson had been a fan of Eagle and had been pushing for a revival of the title since becoming Sport and Adventure group editor at IPC Magazines in 1976. Tomlinson strove to find a balance between making a fresh comic for the 80s while remaining faithful to the spirit of the original. He particularly wanted the title to appeal to parents who remembered the original version and might buy it for their children while they might not buy an existing title. The same ethos was applied to the new Eagle's logo, which updated the stylised eagle of the original version. Dave Hunt, who had experience on Battle Picture Weekly, Tornado and Top Soccer, was chosen as editor, while Ian Rimmer was among the sub-editors on the title.

"Dan Dare" was, Tomlinson felt, the most important feature of the new Eagle. The character had been resurrected in 1977 for the launch of 2000 AD but despite some talented creators had quickly fallen behind the likes of "Judge Dredd" and "Strontium Dog" in readers' affections, and had been unceremoniously dropped after Tornado was merged into 2000 AD. Tomlinson chose to eschew the updated 2000 AD version in favour of hemming closer to Frank Hampson's work on the character, particularly wanting to reintroduce The Mekon, reasoning "he is one of the best villains ever created!" Hunt turned to Pat Mills and John Wagner, who had worked on a planned film adaptation (at the time Gareth Hunt was linked to the role), and they worked on a more faithful version that would still appeal to modern audiences, with Gerry Embleton on art duties. At the behest of the rights-holders the strip continued to follow the adventures of Dare's great-great-grandson, with a similar descendant of his side-kick Digby. Ian Kennedy had been Tomlinson's first choice for drawing the strip, but at the time of the launch was enduring a three-month period of rehabilitation following a car crash. Embleton was instead signed up to draw the strip.

While realising Dare and science fiction were important, Tomlinson wanted the comic to have a mix of genres. He also tapped into some of the techniques which had worked for him on Tiger, such as celebrity columnists in the form of Radio One DJ Mike Read and athlete Daley Thompson. Tomlinson decided to make the new Eagle stand out from other IPC launches like Tornado by giving it a unique hook to stand out, settling on photo strips. The format had been tried with some success in girls' comics, most famously in DC Thomson's Jackie. Hunt agreed, feeling it would make Eagle "different, more modern". The move was controversial; the method was not popular with IPC's artists, who saw the approach as a potential threat to their livelihoods while writer Gerry Finley-Day, who scripted "Sgt. Streetwise" and "Saddle Tramp", thought the format was "slightly restricting". Writer Alan Grant, a regular contributor to 2000 AD, also saw the potential of the format, and worked on creating "Doomlord" with frequent writing partner John Wagner as a science fiction story that was achievable as a photo story. Despite some similarities, Grant would deny the character was consciously influenced by Judge Death. Hunt and Tomlinson hunted for props for the photo strips from theatrical and fancy dress shops. At the time Grant and Wagner contributed so many scripts to IPC titles that managing director John Sanders insisted they use pseudonyms to disguise how prolific they were.

In addition to "Dan Dare" and "Doomlord", the launch issue contained four other stories – two photo strips in the form of police drama "Sgt. Streetwise" and football strip "Thunderbolt & Smokey!" (written by Tom Tully) and two other conventional picture strips, "The Collector" (an anthology where the eponymous host would show readers the story behind an item from his collection, with a rotating group of creators – Alan Moore contributed two early episodes) and the dystopian story "The Tower King", written by Alan Hebden and drawn by José Ortiz. Pat Mills, who had experienced some success scripting photo-story "Nine to Four" for Girl, planned a rock band story called "Streetwise", but the band involved were unable to take part. Mills would later express irritation that the title would later be used for "Sgt. Streetwise".

== Publication history ==
=== Eagle ===
Tomlinson arranged a lavish press launch for Eagle with Tony Kelleher (son of artist agent Pat Kelleher) playing Dan Dare and wrestler Big Daddy making an appearance. The first issue – dated 27 March 1982 – had a print run of 350,000 copies, and the launch drew coverage from the mainstream press, including The Daily Telegraph, The Times and the Daily Star.

April saw the debut of the occasional "Adventures of Fred"; Tomlinson would later claim the humorous photo-strip – which he wrote and starred in – was discontinued on management orders. Hunt made the decision to rotate the photo strips to explore the format; in June the first arcs of "Doomlord" and "Sgt. Streetwise" concluded, and were cycled out for inept private eye "Joe Soap" (another by Grant and Wagner, credited to 'Grant/Grover') and Finley-Day's Western "Saddle Tramp". Neither were particularly popular, leading to "Doomlord II" and, from September, cyborg cop story "Manix". Written initially by Grant and Wagner as Grant/Grover and later by Grant alone as 'Keith Law'. The writers considered the basic idea of Manix absurd – noting that the two tonne character should fall through the floor of most buildings, but ultimately reasoned "if you're going to have a ridiculous concept like a robot secret agent, you might as well have fun with it". The pair also penned picture strip "The House of Daemon", a straight replacement for "The Tower King", again with art by Ortiz. Wagner and Grant were occasionally asked to reign in the strip's horrific content by the editor.

December 1982 saw the end of the first arc of "Dan Dare", with Wagner and Embleton moving on from the strip. With Embleton's style perceived as old-fashioned, "Dan Dare" was again offered to the recovered Ian Kennedy; a childhood fan of the original, he jumped at the chance to join up, recalling it as "a huge challenge and an awful lot of fun". Mills remained as solo writer and decided on a NASA-based approach, influenced by Tom Wolfe's The Right Stuff to play to Kennedy's strength. Other new stories in both formats largely failed to stick for more than a few months, however, and a worrying sign came in July 1983 when the comic began reprinting "One-Eyed Jack" from Valiant.

September 1983 saw the photo strips dropped entirely in favour of conventional stories, though at a cost as the title switched to newsprint and letterpress printing. The photo stories had proved not entirely popular with readers, and turned out to be less cost-effective than hoped. "Doomlord", "Walk or Die" and "Manix" were all reconfigured as normal picture strips from the 24 September 1983 edition, with "Sgt. Streetwise" following in January 1984. Grant continued writing "Doomlord" solo, drawn by Alberto Giolitti, head of the Giolitti art agency. Hunt would later acknowledge "it worked to a certain extent, but we could never replace the imaginations and talents of real-life artists", and pointed to "Doomlord" in particular as a story that worked better in conventional form. The same issue saw the debut of "The Fists of Danny Pyke", about a Liverpudlian boxer, and another Wagner and Grant story – the pair being boxing fans. The pair used the pseudonym 'D. Spence' for the strip, which was illustrated by John Burns (who greatly disliked it). Sales had by this point settled to around 150,000 copies a week.

Parallel to the new weekly Eagle, IPC also set up Eagle Comics as a publishing label to repackage stories from 2000 AD such as "Judge Dredd", "Strontium Dog" and "Nemesis the Warlock" for the American market. Eagle Comics was managed by Nick Landau, and beyond the name and publisher had little to do with the ongoing Eagle comic.

=== Eagle and Scream! ===
Tomlinson hoped to follow up on the success of Eagle with the supernatural comic Scream! but a combination of slow sales, industrial action and management interference saw the title cancelled after fifteen issues, and merged with Eagle. "Monster" and "The Thirteenth Floor" were added to the line-up, while around the same time changes were made to the comic's two biggest hitters. Mills moved on from "Dan Dare", deciding he had "done his penance for reviving the character" and "to leave while I was still ahead". Tomlinson took over as writer under the pseudonym 'D. Horton'. Meanwhile, the veteran Eric Bradbury took over art duties on "Doomlord".

While the amalgamation provided a boost to Eagle's sales, the overall sales of British comics were steadily falling. As such further compromises had to be made to boost the title's profitability. November saw the debut of "Robo Machines", based on the Bandai toyline and with the manufacturer underwriting the cost, while December saw reprints of "Gaunt" from Battle Picture Weekly to save money. The comic bore the new title Eagle and Scream until 23 February 1985, before reverting to Eagle for a month.

=== Eagle and Tiger ===
The cancellation of Scream! was a harbinger, and in April 1985 Tiger was next on the chopping block after collapsing sales, having been the company's best-seller only a few years before. This meant a more thorough influx of stories, including the story of Blake Edmonds in "Death Wish (written by Tomlinson, who moved the story in a more supernatural direction in response to the different content of Eagle), popular football strip "Billy's Boots", "Golden Boy" and "Star Rider" all joining, as well as the all-new "The Ultimate Warrior" in the first Eagle and Tiger, dated 6 April 1985. "The Ultimate Warrior" was another Wagner and Grant contribution, and was renamed "The Computer Warrior" from its second arc. Grant was unable to recall if Disney's Tron was an influence. The strip was sponsored by Commodore, who sent a console and games for research material. Unfortunately the pair proved to be so bad at the games they were forced to request the company send them videos of gameplay instead.

December 1985 saw Tom Tully – who had written the 2000 AD strip for a spell – take over from Tomlinson as writer on "Dan Dare", remaining as the primary writer for the rest of the strip's life. Other new stories from the period included Scott Goodall's "D.A.D.D." – short for "Dial A Dawn Destructor", and detailing the exploits of a rock group whose musical career was a cover for their international crimefighting activities – and "Legend of the Linkits", another licensed story bankrolled by Matchbox, while 2000 AD strips "Ant Wars", "M.A.C.H. 1" and "M.A.C.H. Zero" were also reprinted. June 1986 saw the introduction of "Dolebusters", about a trio of teenagers searching for a job and taking part in get-rich-quick schemes. Burns enjoyed drawing the strip, feeling it was "humorous, without being cartoony – lots of opportunity for action".

=== Eagle ===
By this point Eagle's sales generally hovered around 90,000 per week, around 10,000 less than 2000 AD and reflective of a general loss of interest in comics, with football weeklies such as Shoot! and Match eating into the market. In light of these trends, IPC decided to divest itself of all of its comics, and placed the currently running titles, including Eagle and 2000 AD, in a resurrected Fleetway Publications. On 7 July 1987, IPC sold Fleetway to Egmont Publishing. As well as the running titles, the deal included all comic material published after 1 January 1970, as well as 15 characters from before that date which were still featured in the long-running Buster. Summer 1987 saw the end of the long-running "Death Wish" after an unsuccessful reconfiguration as "The Incredible Adventures of Blake Edmonds", while there was another short-lived toy tie-in with Bluebird's Manta Force.

=== Eagle and Battle ===
Egmont considered halting the weeklies altogether, but Tomlinson was able to come up with a plan where the staff would be reemployed as freelancers working mainly from home to keep the group going and continued as group editor. However, the continuing malaise saw Eagle absorb Battle in 1988. By the time of its cancellation, Battle had been a shadow of its former self, and relied heavily on reprints after the loss of the Action Force licence to Marvel UK at the end of 1986. As such, all it bequeathed to Eagle were Action Force knock-off "Storm Force" and reprints of "Johnny Red" and "Charley's War".

=== Eagle and M.A.S.K. ===
October 1988 saw another merger, this time with the licensed M.A.S.K. title, which had run for two years before the Kenner toyline's fortunes began to decline. The company still underwrote the cost of strips for Eagle for another six months, however.

=== Eagle and Wildcat ===
Tomlinson had created the new fortnightly Wildcat shortly after Battle's closure. The title was a science fiction anthology with the five strips all being centred on the exploits of different characters from the eponymous spacecraft. However, it failed to find an audience and merged with Eagle after only 12 issues, with the four main features from the comic rotating until petering out in 1990.

=== Eagle ===
In July 1989 the title reverted to Eagle once again. "Dan Dare" meanwhile saw Keith Watson – one of the original strip's most popular artists – return to the strip, and the protagonist reverted to the original Dare rather than his descendent.

=== The New Eagle and The New Eagle Monthly ===
Tomlinson was by now the title's editor. April 1990 saw the title given a makeover as The New Eagle; at the behest of Egmont, the logo was also updated. This failed to halt the slide, however, and from May 1991 the title was switched to a monthly schedule, Tomlinson as editor before finally shutting down in 1994.

=== Special and annuals ===
Parallel to the comic's run, the Eagle brand was revived for annuals and specials, though the former ended in 1992 as the annual market dwindled. Other publications under the brand included the 1985 Eagle Picture Library, though this featured no material from the new comic, but instead back catalogue material from older strips such as "The Black Archer", "Rebels of Ancient Rome!" and "The Incredible Adventures of Janus Stark".

== Legacy ==
In 1998 the rights to Dan Dare and the characters created for both versions of the Eagle were purchased from Egmont by the Dan Dare Corporation. The deal did not include stories which had debuted in other comics before mergers; these were retained by Egmont until they were sold to Rebellion Developments in 2016.

The Dan Dare Corporation has leased material from the revived Eagle to Hibernia Books (including "Doomlord", "The House of Daemon" and "The Tower King") and Rebellion Developments ("The Thirteenth Floor").

== Titles ==
- Eagle (27 March 1982 to 25 August 1984)
- Eagle and Scream (1 September 1984 to 23 February 1985)
- Eagle (2 to 30 March 1985)
- Eagle and Tiger (6 April 1985 to 14 June 1986)
- Eagle (21 June 1986 to 23 January 1988)
- Eagle and Battle (30 January to 28 May 1988)
- Eagle (4 June to 22 October 1988)
- Eagle and M.A.S.K. (29 October 1988 to 25 March 1989)
- Eagle (1 April 1989)
- Eagle and Wildcat (8 April to 15 July 1989)
- Eagle (22 July 1989 to 21 April 1990)
- The New Eagle (28 April 1990 to 6 April 1991)
- The New Eagle Monthly (May 1991 to January 1994)

== Spin-offs ==
- Eagle Annual (9 editions, 1983 to 1991)
- Eagle Holiday Special (8 editions, 1983 to 1990)
- Eagle Picture Library (14 editions, May to November 1985)
- The Best of Eagle (6 monthly editions, May to October 1988)
- The New Eagle Yearbook (1 edition, 1992)

== Collected editions ==
Title	ISBN	Publisher	Release date	Contents
Doomlord: The Deathlords of Nox	[ISBN unspecified]	Hibernia Books	2006	Material from Eagle 24 September 1983 to 3 March 1984
The House of Daemon	[ISBN unspecified]	Hibernia Books	2015	Material from Eagle 11 September 1982 to 12 February 1983
Monster	9781781084533	Rebellion Developments	13 July 2016	Material from Scream! 24 March to 30 June 1984, Eagle 1 September 1984 to 30 May 1985, Scream Holiday Special 1986 to 1988
The Thirteenth Floor Vol. 01	9781781086537	Rebellion Developments	18 October 2018	Material from Scream! 24 March to 30 June 1984 and Eagle 1 September 1984 to 13 April 1985.
Turbo Jones	9781781086841	Rebellion Developments	10 January 2019	Material from Wildcat 22 October 1988 to 7 April 1989, Wildcat Winter Special 1989, Wildcat Holiday Special 1990 and Eagle and Wildcat 29 April to 7 October 1989
Loner	9781781086841	Rebellion Developments	4 September 2019	Material from Wildcat 22 October 1988 to 7 April 1989, Wildcat Winter Special 1989, Wildcat Holiday Special 1990, Eagle 29 April 1989 to 21 April 1990, Eagle Holiday Special 1990 and Eagle Annual 1991
The Thirteenth Floor Vol. 02	9781781087725	Rebellion Developments	15 October 2020	Material from Eagle 20 April 1985 to 22 January 1986, Scream! Holiday Special 1982 and Eagle Holiday Special 1986.
The Thirteenth Floor Vol. 03	9781781089347	Rebellion Developments	16 September 2021	Material from Eagle 1 March 1986 to 28 February 1987 and Eagle Annual 1987.

== Reception ==
While acknowledging that "Doomlord" was memorable and that the return of Keith Watson to "Dan Dare" was a positive, TV Cream was less enthusiastic about the "pointless celebrity columns" and mocked the photo-stories, particularly Western "Saddle Tramp" for looking "like a bunch of pasty Eagle employees stomping around the badlands of modern-day Satmford Street and anywhere else within a bus ride of the office".
