= Wizard Warz =

1987 video game

- Developer: Canvas Software
- Publisher: GO! Media Holdings
- Platforms: Amiga, Atari ST, Commodore 64, MS-DOS, Amstrad CPC, ZX Spectrum
- Release: 1987
- Genre: Role-playing
- Mode: Single-player

Wizard Warz is a 1987 role-playing video game developed by Canvas Software and published by GO! (a label of U.S. Gold).

== Gameplay ==
Wizard Warz is a role-playing game with real-time combat. The player is an apprentice wizard whose objective at level 1 is to collect six items by defeating six monsters and return the items to their respective cities. At level 2, the objective is to collect further three magical items. At level 3, the aim is to defeat seven wizards. The spells belong to one of three categories: physical, spiritual and mental. The player has points in each of the categories that are drained by casting the spells.

== Reception ==
Zzap!64 called Wizard Warz "A very poor interpretation of an excellent concept." Commodore User noted it as a good game and recommended it to beginner RPG players. Another reviewer from the magazine said the role-playing aspects are extremely bad. ACE called it a standard RPG. ST Action said the most annoying thing about the game is when the player dies, the game has to be rebooted from the desktop.

Reception

Review scores
Publication	Score
ACE	612/1000
Aktueller Software Markt	8/12
Crash	70%
ST Action	55%
Zzap!64	30%
Amstar & CPC	13/20
Commodore User	7/10 (C64); 40% (Amiga)
Datormagazin	2.5/5
