= M.A.C.H. 1 =

Cartoon strip series in the 2000AD comic

M.A.C.H.1

Publication information
- Publisher: IPC Media
- First appearance: 2000 AD #1 (26 February 1977)
- Created by: Pat Mills & Enio

In-story information
- Alter ego: John Probe
- Team affiliations: British Secret Service
- Abilities: Superhuman strength, speed and durability On-board tactical computer

M.A.C.H. 1 was a comic strip that ran in the British science fiction comic 2000 AD. The strip was created by writer Pat Mills and illustrator Enio. It debuted in the first issue of 2000 AD, which was published in February 1977, and ran nearly continuously until issue 64, dated 13 May 1978.

== Development ==
Pat Mills has said the idea was a deliberate ripoff of The Six Million Dollar Man after kids said they wanted to see that in a comic, and the concept of a computer brain as a partner was taken by John Wagner from Marvel Comics' Deathlok. The name came from Doug Church while Mills, according to Church, came up with the acronym on the spot.

Mills credits the early survival of 2000 AD down to M.A.C.H. 1, stating that for the first year of the comic's publication, M.A.C.H. 1 was by far the most popular strip, helping the comic find its feet until Judge Dredd took over as the leading strip.

== Premise ==
Initially, M.A.C.H. 1 ("M.A.C.H." stands for "Man Activated by Compu-puncture Hyperpower") thematically resembled the Six Million Dollar Man, but with more graphic violence. As the strip continued the tone became increasingly dark. This contrasted directly with The Six Million Dollar Man, who began as a killer, but was progressively softened by the TV networks until it fitted into family entertainment. Probe's physical reaction to compu-puncture changed as the story progressed - early strips (such as "Probesnatch") showed that without action the hyperpower would build up in his system and he would need to physically exert himself to burn it off, whereas later strips (especially highlighted in "Return to Sharpe") dictated that unless Probe received regular doses of compu-puncture he would burn out and die through lack of energy.

=== Plot ===
John Probe is a British Secret Service agent at first engaging in missions against Communists, terrorists and organised crime. He has been given extreme physical enhancement by a method known as "compu-puncture" to give him "hyperpower" equivalent to the strength of fifty men, and computer circuitry imprinted onto his skull to control and advise on use of the hyperpower. The computer also grants him occasional mental skills, such as how to pilot aeroplanes, drive an armoured car, or specific scientific and military knowledge he would not normally possess. Probe eventually discovers that his superior, Denis Sharpe, had engineered the compu-puncture treatment which had given him his abilities so as to erase Probe's pre-augmented memory and to cause his death if he did not receive frequent treatments. As a result, Probe was forced to work for Sharpe.

Probe attempted to leave Sharpe and the service several times, but was forced to return for controlling hyperpower injections to prevent his energy flow from falling below survival level - although one story ("Return to Sharpe") states that it has been six weeks since his last dose of compu-puncture. Probe's computer would often attempt to overrule or counter his human emotions, but as the story wore on Probe became more and more resentful to both the computer and Sharpe's orders, often disobeying the computer's advice completely. Eventually, M.A.C.H. 1 killed Sharpe and then sacrificed himself to enable aliens, provoked into attacking Earth by Sharpe, to return home. Probe's life before his compu-puncture treatment was never clarified or explained, and it was stated several times that the only person who knew anything about his prior life was Sharpe himself.

== Characters ==
- John Probe: A British Secret Service agent who volunteered for a special procedure whereby his physical strength, speed and agility would be enhanced using 'compu-puncture', a computerized form of acupuncture using multiple 'electro-needles'. His metabolism was controlled by a computer implanted in his skull, which also fed him tactical information such as the amount of strength or the exact throwing angle required for a given task.
- M.A.C.H. Zero: M.A.C.H. 1 later met M.A.C.H. Zero, a prototype agent who had not been equipped with a computer implant and had consequently been driven insane by the uncontrolled hyperpower. M.A.C.H. Zero later appeared in his own strip, involving a search for his son Tommy, based on a case of mistaken identity
- Tanya Maski, an East European M.A.C.H. agent created after Sharpe sold the compu-puncture techniques to the Soviets. Maski had been created using inferior technology and although she possessed similar hyperpower to M.A.C.H. 1 would burn out much sooner. Aware of this, she sacrificed herself to allow M.A.C.H. 1 to escape and confront Sharpe over his involvement.
- M.A.C.H. 2 a robot successor to M.A.C.H. 1, created by Sharpe in order to remove the human element and perceived limitations from the M.A.C.H. project. M.A.C.H. 1 fought M.A.C.H. 2, and was beaten, but managed to severely damage M.A.C.H. 2 during the fight. Sharpe prevented M.A.C.H. 2 from killing M.A.C.H. 1, recognising that the human element - which was what enabled M.A.C.H. 1 to damage M.A.C.H. 2 - may still have use.

== Publications ==
Both M.A.C.H. 1 and M.A.C.H. Zero appeared in their own eponymous series. M.A.C.H. 1 and M.A.C.H. Zero were later reprinted in Eagle, and M.A.C.H. 1 was also in anthology format (the beginning and end in 2000AD Extreme Edition #6 and #9). Appearances include:

=== M.A.C.H. 1 ===
- "Vulcan" (with Pat Mills (1)/Robert Flynn (2) and Enio (1)/Ian Kennedy (2), in 2000 AD #1-2, 1977)
- "Battleship" (in 2000AD #3, 1977)
- "To Kill a President" (in 2000AD #4, 1977)
- "Probesnatch" (in 2000AD #5, 1977)
- "Himmler's Gold" (in 2000AD #6, 1977)
- "Bolavia" (in 2000AD #7, 1977)
- "Spain Kidnap" (in 2000AD #8, 1977)
- "Our Man in Turkostan" (in 2000AD #9, 1977)
- "On the Roof of the World" (in 2000AD #10, 1977)
- "Operation Death-Drive!" (in 2000AD #11, 1977)
- "The Laser Hound" (in 2000AD #12, 1977)
- "Airship" (in 2000AD #13, 1977)
- "Chinese Formula" (with Steve MacManus and Kato, in 2000 AD #14, 1977)
- "Kraal" (in 2000AD Summer Special, 1977)
- "Yeti" (in 2000AD #15, 1977)
- "Capitol" (in 2000AD #16, 1977)
- "Spotbox" (in 2000AD #17, 1977)
- "Skyscraper Terrorists" (in 2000AD #18, 1977)
- "Corporal Tanaka" (in 2000AD #19, 1977)
- "Tokyo" (with Steve MacManus and Lopez, in 2000 AD #20, 1977)
- "Recluse" (in 2000AD #21, 1977)
- "Arab Story" (in 2000AD #22, 1977)
- "Spy Plane" (in 2000AD #23, 1977)
- "King Karat" (in 2000AD #24, 1977)
- "Terror Train" (in 2000AD #25, 1977)
- "The Death Trumpet" (with Steve MacManus and Marzal Canos, in 2000 AD #26, 1977)
- "The Planet Killers" (in 2000AD #27 - 29, 1977)
- "Operation Hercules" (in 2000AD Annual 1978, 1977)
- "UFO" (in 2000AD #30 - 33, 1977)
- "Everest" (in 2000AD #34 - 35, 1977)
- "M.A.C.H. Woman" (in 2000AD #36 - 39, 1977)
- "Death Ray" (in 2000AD #40 - 42, 1977)
- "M.A.C.H. Zero" (with Steve MacManus and Ramon Sola, in 2000 AD #43-46, 1977–1978)
- "Return to Sharpe" (in 2000AD #53, 1978)
- "The Dolphin Tapes" (with Steve MacManus and Jesus Redondo (1–2), Montero (3–4), in 2000 AD #54-57, 1978)
- "Swamp Saga" (in 2000AD #58, 1978)
- "Origins" (in 2000AD #59 - 60, 1978)
- "The Final Encounter " (with Pat Mills and Montero, in 2000 AD #61-64, 1978)
- "The Mach-Man File (in 2000AD Sci-Fi Special 1978)
- "The Taxaco Venture" (in 2000AD Sci-Fi Special 1979)

=== M.A.C.H. Zero ===
- "Cousin George " (with Steve MacManus and Mike Donaldson (1–2, 4, 6–8), Ramon Sola (3, 5), in 2000 AD #65-72, 1978)
- "Cyborg Express" (with Henry Miller and Kevin O'Neill, in 2000AD Sci-Fi Special 1978)
- "The Suit" (with Steve MacManus and Montero, in 2000 AD #73-75, 1978)
- "M.A.C.H. Zero Book 2" (with Steve MacManus and Mike Dorey, in 2000 AD #162-165, 1980)

== Collected editions ==
- M.A.C.H. 1: The John Probe Mission Files (Rebellion Books, 22 March 2018, ISBN 978-1781086131):

- Progs 1-33
- 2000AD Summer Special 1977
- 2000AD Annual 1978
- Gallery of covers

- M.A.C.H. 1: Close Encounters (Rebellion Books, 18 April 2019, ISBN 978-1781086742):

- Progs 34-46
- Progs 53-75
- Progs 162-165
- 2000AD Sci-Fi Special 1978
- 2000AD Annual 1979
- 2000AD Sci-Fi Special 1979
- Gallery of covers

== Parodies ==
=== B.L.A.I.R. 1 ===
A spoof, entitled B.L.A.I.R. 1, a satire on Tony Blair, appeared in 2000 AD in the late 1990s, and gained considerable media attention at the time. The story was not popular with readers, however, and was soon killed off.

- B.L.A.I.R. 1 (with art from Simon Davis):
  - "B.L.A.I.R. 1" (with David Bishop/Steve MacManus, in 2000 AD #1034, 1997)
  - "Blair Force One" (with Alan Grant, in 2000 AD #1071-1074, 1997)
  - "Criminal Record" (with Alan Grant, in 2000 AD #1084, 1998)
  - "He Died with his Boots on" (with Alan Grant, in 2000 AD #1097-1098, 1998)

=== Z.O.M.B.O. ===
A second spoof ran in the 40th Anniversary Special: a fake 'original' version of the strip Zombo, dropped from the comic's original line-up. Z.O.M.B.O. parodied M.A.C.H. 1, Invasion!, and other British 1970s strip tropes with an over-the-top working class Zombo (playing the John Probe role) paired with an upper-class Etonian.
