= Wildcat (British comics) =

British weekly comic

- The cover of Wildcat No. 2 from 5 November 1988.

Publication information
- Publisher: Fleetway Publications
- Schedule: Fortnightly
- Format: Ongoing series
- Genre: Action/adventure
- Publication date: 22 October 1988 – 25 March 1989
- No. of issues: 12
- Main character(s): Joe Alien; Kitten Magee; Loner; Turbo Jones

Creative team
- Created by: Barrie Tomlinson
- Written by: David Robinson; Barrie Tomlinson; James Tomlinson
- Artist(s): Massimo Belardinelli; Joan Boix; Ian Kennedy; José Ortiz; David Pugh; Ron Smith; Vanyo
- Editor(s): Barrie Tomlinson

Wildcat was a fortnightly British comics periodical published by Fleetway Publications from 22 October 1988 to 25 March 1989 (Note: Each issue of Wildcat bore the on-sale and off-sale dates on the cover; the final issue bore the date 'March 25th - April 7th 1989', so the latter is sometimes listed as the end date of the series). A science fiction adventure comic, the title only lasted for 12 editions before being merged with another Fleetway title, Eagle.

== Creation ==
In 1987 IPC Magazines had sold their comic titles to Robert Maxwell's Mirror Group Newspapers. The following year the experienced group editor Barrie Tomlinson – who had previously launched the successful Tiger spinoff Roy of the Rovers and the 1982 revival of Eagle, as well as the shorter-lived Speed and Scream! – was asked to create a new science fiction-themed anthology as a 'junior version' of 2000 AD. Tomlinson devised a novel concept for the new title, Wildcat; whereas previous Fleetway anthology comics had largely (if not universally) consisted of unconnected stories, he decided that the five strips of the new title would interlink. Tomlinson had enjoyed moving out of his comfort zone of sports comics previously and relished that Wildcat gave him a chance to try science fiction; while 2000 AD itself was under his group, he largely left the capable Steve MacManus to run the title unless his help was asked for. The idea of linking the stories was also something new for Tomlinson, while also giving Wildcat a different twist to 2000AD.

The central conceit of Wildcat concerned an eponymous ship setting out from a doomed Earth in the year 2500, looking for a new planet to colonise. One thread consisted of standalone stories set on the Wildcat itself, while four serials – "Turbo Jones", "Loner", "Kitten Magee" and "Joe Alien" – would follow the exploration exploits of various parties onboard the ship. Tomlinson devised the initial stories himself and wrote the scripts for the first couple of issues before passing some of them on to other writers. Tomlinson retained "Turbo Jones" – initially drawn by Ian Kennedy and later Spanish duo Vanyo – and "Loner", with art by David Pugh. David Robinson took over as writer on the Massimo Belardinelli-drafted "Joe Alien"; Belardinelli would later make way for Ron Smith as artist. José Ortiz meanwhile drew "Kitten Magee", which was later written by Tomlinson's son James, who wrote for Wildcat (as well as Eagle and Battle Action Force) under the pseudonym James Nicholas to avoid the appearance of nepotism. Tomlinson would also continue to write the ship-based stories, most of which were drawn by Joan Boix, and were later titled "The Wildcat Complete". Kennedy designed the Wildcat itself, which Tomlinson felt was "superbly drawn".

== Publishing history ==
Wildcat was previewed by a 16-page insert given away with issues of 2000 AD, Eagle, Roy of the Rovers, Buster, Oink!, Whizzer and Chips and M.A.S.K. on 15 October and 22 October 1988; it contained a prelude strip by Tomlinson and Kennedy introducing the premise The magazine launched on the latter date; Tomlinson opted for a fortnightly schedule both due to the falling circulations of comics at the time and to reduce the strain on the artists given that each story was 5 pages long. The title also featured pin-ups of the characters and a letters page 'hosted' by the robot Crud, one of Kitten Magee's sidekicks. As well as the front and back covers, six interior pages were in colour, typically used for "Joe Alien" and pinups.

However, the comic failed to find an audience, and was cancelled after 12 issues in March 1989. Tomlinson would later wonder if the decision to make the title fortnightly had cost it momentum, though he would also note that the British comics market was continuing to contract, with the previous year having seen MASK, Oink! and Hot-Shot all end. He later felt "the title was one of the best [he] produced", and was gratified when Rebellion Developments chose serials from Wildcat for their Treasury of British Comics reprint series decades later.

Wildcat was subsequently merged with Eagle from 8 April 1989. All five strips would subsequently rotate in the title until "Loner" ended on 21 April 1990; the joint branding disappeared from Eagle after 7 July 1989. Two specials were also issued in 1989, using material left over from the regular run as well as some reprints of vintage "Jet-Ace Logan" strips. "Loner" and "Turbo Jones" were both also repackaged by Quality Communications for the international market – the former as a seven issue limited series and the latter as a one-shot graphic novel.

After Rebellion Developments bought the rights to IPC's back catalogue of comics in 2016, it announced that it would reprint most of the stories from Wildcat under its Treasury of British Comics imprint, starting with Turbo Jones in January 2019 and then Loner in September 2019. As of 2025, no further volumes have been produced.

== Stories ==
=== The Battle to Survive ===
Published: 22 October 1988
Writer: Barrie Tomlinson
Artist: Ian Kennedy

- A one page recap of the preview issue.

=== Joe Alien ===
Published: 22 October 1988 to 25 March 1989
Writer: Barrie Tomlinson, David Robinson
Artist: Massimo Belardinelli, Ron Smith

The last survivor of friendly alien planet Xgangbe-4 takes the name Joe Alien, and uses his telescopic limbs and highly advanced cybernetic brain to help humanity find a new home. As such he is put in charge of Shuttle Two and its exploration team.

- Continued in Eagle.

=== Kitten Magee ===
Published: 22 October 1988 to 25 March 1989
Writer: Barrie Tomlinson, James Tomlinson (under the pseudonym James Nicholas)
Artist: José Ortiz

Formerly leader and benefactor of the militant World Campaign Against Male Dominance, Kitten Magee provides $20m from her fortune to help fund the Wildcat. As a result, Turbo Jones gives her command of Shuttle Three, backed by her followers and her robot Crud.

- Continued in Eagle. In 2019 a planned collection by Rebellion Developments was announced but as of 2025 has yet to appear.

=== Loner ===
Published: 22 October 1988 to 25 March 1989
Writer: Barrie Tomlinson
Artist: David Pugh, Eric Bradbury

The antisocial galactic mercenary known as Loner surprises everyone by putting $20m in his earnings (aided by a lottery win) towards the funding of Wildcat and is given the fourth exploration shuttle. Unlike the other parties he opts to only take his custom six-shooter Babe along to new planets.

- Continued in Eagle. The complete "Loner" strips were issued in the Rebellion Developments collection Wildcat: Loner in September 2019 as part of the Treasury of British Comics, with a foreword by David Pugh.

=== Turbo Jones ===
Published: 22 October 1988 to 25 March 1989
Writer: Barrie Tomlinson
Artist: Ian Kennedy, Vanyo

Science-hero Turbo Jones discovered the meteor shower set to destroy Earth in 2492, and is the driving force behind the Wildcat mission. He also heads up one of the exploration teams, aided by cyborg chimpanzee Robo.

- Continued in Eagle. The complete "Turbo Jones" strips were issued in the Rebellion Developments collection Wildcat: Loner in January 2019 as part of the Treasury of British Comics, with a foreword by Barrie Tomlinson.

=== The Wildcat Complete ===
Published: 22 October 1988 to 25 March 1989
Writer: Barrie Tomlinson
Artist: Joan Boix

While the exploration teams explore each planet, other members of the crew deal with other crises.

- Continued in Eagle. The umbrella title of "The Wildcat Complete" was not used until the tenth issue; before then the self-contained strips had used individual titles.

== Spin-offs ==
- Wildcat Holiday Special (1989)
- Wildcat Winter Special (1989)
