= Vanyo =

Vanyo is the professional name of two comics artists, brothers Vicente Vaño Ibarra (1947–2006) and Eduardo Vaño Ibarra (b. 1944). Their work in British comics includes "Judge Dredd" for 2000 AD, "Death Wish" for Speed, "Bloodfang" and "The Hand" for Eagle. They also worked for Battle Action Force, Tornado and Wildcat.
