= Keith Watson (artist) =

British comics artist (1935–1994)

- Born: 1 February 1935 Ormesby, Yorkshire, England
- Died: 9 April 1994 (aged 59) Cheam, London, England
- Areas: Writer, Artist
- Notable works: Dan Dare, Captain Scarlet and the Mysterons

Keith Watson (1 February 1935 – 9 April 1994) was a British comics artist most famous for his work on Dan Dare and TV Century 21.

== Career ==
Watson joined the studio team of Frank Hampson working on the Dan Dare strip in Eagle in 1958. After Hampson left the strip the following year, Watson worked on Captain Condor for the rival comic Lion. He later returned to Dan Dare, becoming the sole artist.

Watson worked on the Captain Scarlet and the Mysterons strip in TV Century 21, and the Joe 90 strip in the comic of the same name, and later in the merged "TV21 and Joe 90". He also wrote some of the later episode.

During the 1970s, he worked for the Dutch comic series Roel Dijkstra.

In 1989, he revived the original Dare for the new Eagle comic, which until then had been publishing tales of a descendant.

In 1994, he died from cancer aged 59.
