= Ian Kennedy (comics) =

UK comics artist (1932–2022)

- Born: 22 September 1932 Dundee, Scotland
- Died: 5 February 2022 (aged 89)
- Area: Artist
- Notable works: Dan Dare

Ian Kennedy (22 September 1932 – 5 February 2022) was a British artist who worked initially for D. C. Thomson & Co. Ltd, then later for Amalgamated Press.

== Biography ==
Educated at the Clepington Primary School and then at Morgan Academy, both in Dundee, Kennedy was employed after leaving school by D. C. Thomson & Co. He was taken on as a trainee illustrator in their Art Department in 1949. He recalled that his first published work was inking the black squares in the weekly Sunday Post crossword.

In 1953 having become married, Kennedy managed to get work in Amalgamated Press's Knockout via a local agent. In 1955 he began working for D. C. Thomson again, this time as a freelance artist.

During the 1950s Kennedy mainly illustrated war comics such as Thriller Picture Library and Air Ace and his work appeared in a range of comics including Hotspur, Buster, and The Wizard.

From the 1970s onward, Kennedy began to extend his range to science fiction comics, regularly producing work for IPC's 2000AD and Star Lord. He also worked for Battle Picture Weekly, Buddy, Blake's 7, Eagle (Dan Dare), M.A.S.K., Victor Summer Special, Wildcat and D. C. Thomson's pocket books (including Commando).

Kennedy also produced many covers over the years for different comics and annuals, working mainly in acrylic paint. In the late 1980s and 1990s Kennedy began creating the covers for the annual RAF Leuchars Air Show's programmes.

He went into semi-retirement in 1997, but still continued to draw covers and features for Commando until his death.

A definitive career-spanning interview with Kennedy appears in the Spring 2009 edition (Vol.11, No.1) of the "International Journal of Comic Art".

Kennedy died in February 2022, at the age of 89.

== Bibliography ==
Comics work includes:

- Jeff Craig Detective (Buster)
- Tiger McTaggart (Wizard)
- Typhoon Tennyson (Wizard)
- M.A.C.H. 1: "Vulcan" (with Robert Flynn, in 2000 AD #2, 1977)
- Invasion:
  - "Wembley" (with Gerry Finley-Day, in 2000 AD #6, 1977)
  - "Jump Jet" (with Chris Lowder, in 2000 AD #36, 1977)
- Ro-Busters:
  - "Midpoint" (with Chris Lowder as Bill Henry, in Starlord #5-6, 1978)
  - "Farnborough Droid Show" (with Pat Mills as V. Gross, in Starlord #13-14, 1978)
- Time Quake (with Chris Lowder, in Starlord #1-13, 1978)
- Dan Dare:
  - Untitled (in Eagle Annual 1979, 1978)
  - "Return of the Mekon" (with Barrie Tomlinson, John Wagner and Pat Mills, in Eagle #19-26, 1982)
  - "The Dare Report" (with Pat Mills, in Eagle #34-38, 1982)
  - "Fireflight" (with Pat Mills, in Eagle #39-83, 1982)
- Tharg's Future Shocks: "The Collector" (with Kelvin Gosnell, in 2000 AD #210, 1981)
- Judge Dredd: "99 Red" (with John Wagner/Alan Grant, in 2000 AD #423, 1985)

=== Covers ===
Covers work includes:

- over 1,600 covers for Commando
- 2000 AD #96, 446, 1961
- Starlord #20
- Tornado #5-6, 10, 13, 16 and 18
- Eagle #42, 47, 50-83
