= Barrie Tomlinson =

British comics editor and writer (1938–2026)

Barrie Tomlinson (2 February 1938 – 21 April 2026) was a British comics editor, writer and publicist, best known for his influential role in the development of UK comics during the late 20th century. He is particularly associated with the success of Roy of the Rovers and his involvement in titles such as Tiger, Battle Picture Weekly, and 2000 AD.

== Early life and career ==
Tomlinson was born on 2 February 1938 in St Albans, England, where he spent most of his life. He began his career in 1961 after responding to a job advertisement seeking contributors for children’s comics. Tomlinson began his career at IPC Magazines in 1961, initially as a writer and then later as copyeditor on the comics Lion (1961–1967) and then Tiger, becoming editor of the latter title in 1969.

One of the comic’s most notable features was the story of Roy Race, a fictional footballer who first appeared in 1954. Tomlinson played a significant role in expanding the character’s popularity, contributing to the development of Roy of the Rovers as a standalone title, and becoming the founding editor of the comics Roy of the Rovers (1976), followed by Speed (1980), Scream! (1984), Wildcat (1988) and Teenage Mutant Hero Turtles (1990).

== Editorial work and publicity innovations ==
Tomlinson was noted for combining editorial expertise with innovative promotional strategies. In the absence of advertising budgets, he secured endorsements from public figures, often featuring them alongside promotional material for Roy of the Rovers. Contributors and supporters included figures such as Eric Morecambe, Ernie Wise, Prince Philip, Duke of Edinburgh, Gordon Banks, Geoffrey Boycott, Peter Sellers, and Pelé.

The weekly Roy of the Rovers comic achieved initial sales exceeding 300,000 copies and became one of the publisher’s most successful titles. Under Tomlinson’s direction, the character of Roy Race became widely recognised in British popular culture, and the phrase “Real Roy of the Rovers stuff” entered common usage to describe notable sporting achievements.

He also introduced reader engagement initiatives, including a telephone feedback system that allowed audiences to comment on publications.

== Later career ==
Tomlinson became Group Editor for Sports and Adventure in 1976, overseeing multiple titles. His management style allowed editors such as Steve MacManus to develop 2000 AD during its period of critical and commercial success in the 1980s.

In 1982, he relaunched Eagle (a title originally published between 1950 and 1969), something for which he had long campaigned. For this revival, he wrote series including "Death Wish" and "Survival". The success of these projects contributed to the launch of Scream! in 1984, a short-lived but influential horror-themed comic.

During the late 1980s, Tomlinson worked on additional publications, including the science fiction comic Wildcat and licensed titles such as Teenage Mutant Ninja Turtles. Following changes in the publishing industry, including the acquisition of IPC by Egmont Group in 1991, Tomlinson transitioned to freelance work.

He subsequently wrote the football strip "Scorer" for the Daily Mirror, producing over 6,000 episodes across a 22-year period in collaboration with several artists.

== Death ==
Tomlinson died on 21 April 2026, at the age of 88.

== Bibliography ==
Tomlinson wrote most of the stories in Wildcat, as well as "Death Wish" for Speed, all of which continued to appear in Eagle after the cancellation of the comics in which they had originated. He also wrote "Survivor" for Eagle.

Tomlinson wrote two books of memoirs about his career in the British comics industry:

- Real Roy of the Rovers Stuff, Pitch Publishing, ISBN 978-1785-31212-0, October 2016
- Comic Book Hero, Pitch Publishing, ISBN 978-1785-31324-0, September 2017

== Sources ==
- "When Eagles Dared" by Karl Stock, Judge Dredd Megazine #389, 14 November 2017, p. 63
- "Cat O'Four Tales" by Stephen Jewell, in Judge Dredd Megazine #403, 15 January 2019, pp. 40–43.
- "Fast Fiction" by Stephen Jewell, in Judge Dredd Megazine #410, 20 August 2019, pp. 50–53
- "The Comic That Roared – Lion" by Stephen Jewell, in Judge Dredd Megazine #421, 14 July 2020, pp. 40–44.
- "In Conversation With Barrie Tomlinson" at OldNDazed.co.uk
