= John Wagner bibliography =

- Active period: 1971–Present

Publishers
- 2000 AD: 1977–Present
- DC Comics: 1987–1997
- Dark Horse Comics: 1995–2003

John Wagner has worked on a wide range of British comics most notably working on Judge Dredd and the various spin-offs.

Wagner has often written under a number of pseudonyms, including John Howard, T. B. Grover and Keef Ripley.

== IPC/Fleetway ==
Wagner broke into writing comics in 1971 in partnership with Pat Mills, writing scripts for IPC humour comics like Cor!! and Whizzer and Chips.

=== Valiant ===
- "Yellowknife of the Yard", co-written with Pat Mills, art by Douglas Maxted, 1971
- "One-Eyed Jack", art by John Cooper, 1975–76 (continued with other writers in Battle Picture Weekly, 1976); later reprinted in Eagle
- "Soldier Sharp", art by Joe Colquhoun, 1976; continued in Battle Picture Weekly, 1976

=== Jet ===
- "Patridge's Patch", co-written with Pat Mills, art by Mike Western, 1971

=== Tammy ===
- "School for Snobs", co-written with Pat Mills, 1971
- "Bella at the Bar", one of several writers, art by John Armstrong, 1974–

=== Lion ===
- "The Can-Do Kids", co-written with Pat Mills, c. 1971–2

=== Sandie ===
- "Jeannie and her Uncle Meanie", c. 1973

=== Battle Picture Weekly ===
- "Rat Pack", one of several writers, 1975–76
- "The Flight of the Golden Hinde", one of several writers, 1975
- "The Bootneck Boy", one of several writers, 1975–77
- "Lofty's One-Man Luftwaffe", one of several writers, 1975
- "D-Day Dawson", one of several writers, 1975–77
- "The Fortrose Falcon", first episode, remainder written by Eric Hebden, 1975
- "They Can't Stop Bullet", one of several writers, 1975
- "Battle Badge of Bravery", one of several writers, 1975
- "Return of the Eagle", one of several writers, 1975–76
- "Darkie's Mob", art by Mike Western, 1976–77; reprinted in the Judge Dredd Megazine, 2003; hardcover, Titan Books, April 2010, ISBN 1-84856-442-2
- "Joe Two Beans", art by Eric Bradbury, 1977
- "Gaunt", art by John Cooper, 1977
- "HMS Nightshade", art by Mike Western, 1978–79
- "Fight for the Falklands", art by Jim Watson, 1982–83
- "Invasion 1984!" co-written with Alan Grant (credited to R. Clark), art by Eric Bradbury, 1983

=== Action ===
- "Black Jack", #1–30, 1976–1977 (later episodes written by Jack Adrian)

=== The 2000 AD group ===
Work done for 2000 AD, Starlord and Judge Dredd Megazine

- M.A.C.H. 1 (in 2000 AD #9 & 16, 1977)
- Judge Dredd:
  - Complete Case Files Volume 1 (336 pages, December 2005, ISBN 1-904265-79-0)
    - Judge Dredd, 2000 AD #9–18, 20–23, 25–28, 32–60, 1977–78, including:
        - "The Robot Wars", art by Carlos Ezquerra, Ron Turner, Mike McMahon and Ian Gibson, #10–17
  - Complete Case Files Volume 2 (320 pages, February 2006, ISBN 1-904265-83-9)
    - Judge Dredd, 2000 AD #61–115, 1978–79, including:
      - The Day the Law Died", art by various, #89–108
  - Complete Case Files Volume 3 (240 pages, April 2006, ISBN 1-904265-87-1)
    - Judge Dredd, 2000 AD #116–151, 1979–80, including:
      - "Judge Death", art by Brian Bolland, #149–151
  - Complete Case Files Volume 4 (336 pages, June 2006, ISBN 1-904265-90-1)
    - Judge Dredd, 2000 AD #155–182 & 184–207, 1980–81, including:
      - "The Judge Child", co-written with Alan Grant, art by Brian Bolland, Mike McMahon and Ron Smith, #156–181
  - Complete Case Files Volume 5 (384 pages, October 2006, ISBN 1-905437-08-0)
    - Judge Dredd, 2000 AD #208–270, 1981–82, including:
      - "Judge Death Lives", co-written with Alan Grant, art by Brian Bolland, #224–228
      - "Block Mania", co-written with Alan Grant, art by Mike McMahon, Ron Smith, Steve Dillon and Brian Bolland, #236–244
      - "The Apocalypse War", co-written with Alan Grant, art by Carlos Ezquerra, #245–270
  - Complete Case Files Volume 6 (336 pages, November 2006, ISBN 1-905437-09-9)
    - Judge Dredd, 2000 AD #271–321, 1982–83
  - Complete Case Files Volume 7 (352 pages, March 2007, ISBN 1-905437-20-X)
    - Judge Dredd, 2000 AD #322–375, 1983–84
  - Complete Case Files Volume 8 (336 pages, May 2007, ISBN 1-905437-27-7)
    - Judge Dredd, 2000 AD #375–423, 1984–85, including
      - "City of the Damned", co-written with Alan Grant, art by various, #293–406
  - Complete Case Files Volume 9 (357 pages, November 2007, ISBN 1-905437-47-1)
    - Judge Dredd, 2000 AD #424–473, 1985–86
  - Complete Case Files Volume 10 (368 pages, June 2008, ISBN 1-905437-68-4)
    - Judge Dredd, 2000 AD #474–522, 1986–87
  - Complete Case Files Volume 11 (368 pages, October 2008, ISBN 1-905437-79-X) includes:
    - Judge Dredd, 2000 AD #523–570, 1987–88, including:
      - "Oz", co-written with Alan Grant, art by various, #545–570
  - Complete Case Files Volume 12 (336 pages, January 2009, ISBN 1-905437-91-9)
    - Judge Dredd, 2000 AD #571–586, 588–597, 599, 601, 603–606, 608–612, 615–618, 1988–89
  - Complete Case Files Volume 13 (272 pages, July 2009, ISBN 1-906735-07-7)
    - Judge Dredd, 2000 AD #620–621, 623–626, 632–635, 638–639, 641–646, 648–655, 657–658, 661, 1989–90
  - Complete Case Files Volume 14 (272 pages, November 2009, ISBN 1-906735-29-8)
    - Judge Dredd, 2000 AD #662–699, 1990, including
      - "Tale of the Dead Man", art by Will Simpson, Jeff Anderson, 662–668
      - "Necropolis", art by Carlos Ezquerra, #669–699 (including "Countdown to Necropolis" episodes)
  - Complete Case Files Volume 15 (320 pages, April 2010, ISBN 1-906735-44-1)
    - Judge Dredd, 2000 AD #700–710, 716–718, 721–726, 1990–91
  - Judge Dredd, Judge Dredd Megazine Vol 1 #1–3 & 7–9, 1990–1991
  - Complete Case Files Volume 16 (336 pages, August 2010, ISBN 1-906735-50-6)
    - Judge Dredd, 2000 AD #739, 750–753, 1991–92
  - Complete Case Files Volume 17 (304 pages, February 2011, ISBN 1-907519-83-1)
    - Judge Dredd, Judge Dredd Megazine Vol 2 #1–3, 1992
  - Complete Case Files Volume 18 (304 pages, September 2011, ISBN 1-907992-25-1)
    - Judge Dredd, Judge Dredd Megazine Vol 2 #12–18, 21–26, 1992–93, including:
      - "Mechanismo", art by Colin MacNeil, Vol 2 #12–27
      - "Mechanismo Returns", art by Peter Doherty, Vol 2 #22–26
  - Complete Case Files Volume 19 (320 pages, May 2012, ISBN 1-907992-96-0)
    - Judge Dredd, Judge Dredd Megazine Vol 2 #31–43, 1993, including:
      - "Mechanismo: Body Count", art by Manuel Benet, Vol 2 #37–43
  - Judge Dredd: The Complete P.J. Maybe (192 pages, September 2006, ISBN 1-904265-96-0) collects:
    - "Bug" (with co-author Alan Grant and art by Liam Sharp, in 2000 AD #534, 1987)
    - "PJ Maybe, Age 13 " (with art by Liam Sharp, in 2000 AD #592–594, 1988)
    - "The Further Adventures of PJ Maybe, Age 14" (with art by Liam Sharp, in 2000 AD #599, 1988)
    - "The Confeshuns of PJ Maybe" (with art by Liam Sharp, in 2000 AD #632–634, 1989)
    - "Wot I Did During Necropolis" (with art by Anthony Williams, in 2000 AD #707–709, 1990)
    - "The All New Adventures of P. J. Maybe" (with art by Peter Doherty, in 2000 AD #1204, 2000)
    - "You're a Better Man Than I Am, Gunga Dinsdale" (with art by Ben Oliver, in 2000 AD #1210, 2000)
    - "Bring Me the Heart of P. J. Maybe" (with art by Ben Oliver, in 2000 AD #1211, 2000)
    - "Six" (with art by Chris Weston, in Judge Dredd Megazine #221–222, 2004)
    - "The Monsterus Mashinashuns of P.J. Maybe" (with art by Carlos Ezquerra, in Judge Dredd Megazine #231–234, 2005)
  - "Bury My Knee at Wounded Heart" (with Peter Doherty, in Judge Dredd Megazine vol. 2 #46, February 1994)
  - Judge Dredd (in Judge Dredd Megazine vol.2 # 46–48 & 50–69, 1994)
  - Judge Dredd (in Judge Dredd Megazine vol.2 # 70–83, 1995)
  - "Terror with Mrs. Gunderson" (with Jason Brashill, in Judge Dredd Megazine vol. 2 #80, May 1995)
  - "Language Barrier" (with Jason Brashill, in 2000 AD #950, July 1995)
  - Judge Dredd (in Judge Dredd Megazine vol.3 # 2–7 & 9–10, 1995)
  - The Pit (tpb, Hamlyn, 1997, ISBN 0-600-59433-5, Rebellion 2008, ISBN 1-905437-84-6) collects:
    - "The Pit" (with Carlos Ezquerra, Colin MacNeil and Lee Sullivan, in 2000 AD #970–983,
    - "True Grot" (with Alex Ronald, in 2000 AD #984–986, March–April 1996)
    - "Unjudicial Liaisons" (with Carlos Ezquerra, in 2000 AD #987–989
    - "Last Rites" (with Lee Sullivan, in 2000 AD #990
    - "Declaration of War" (with Lee Sullivan, in 2000 AD #991
    - "Bongo War" (with Lee Sullivan, Alex Ronald and Carlos Ezquerra, in 2000 AD #992–999, May–July, 1996)
  - "Lethal Weapon" (with Jason Brashill, in Judge Dredd Megazine vol. 3 #17, May 1996)
  - "My Beautiful Career" (with Alex Ronald, in 2000 AD #1010, September 1996)
  - "View From a Window" (with Eoin Covenay, in Judge Dredd Megazine vol. 3 #22, October 1996)
  - The Hunting Party (August 2006, ISBN 978-1904265917) collects:
    - "The Pack (with Henry Flint, in 2000 AD #1014–1016, 1996)
    - "The Hunting Party" (with Sean Phillips, #1033, 1997)
    - "Lost in Americana" (with Trevor Hairsine, #1034–1036, 1997)
    - "Fog on the Eerie" (with Calum Alexander Watt, #1037–1040, 1997)
    - "Dance of the Spider Queen," art by Henry Flint, #1041–1044, 1997)
    - "Camp Demento" (with Jason Brashill, in 2000 AD #1045–1046, June 1997)
    - "Shark Country" (with David Bircham, #1047–1048, 1997)
    - "Trail of the Man-Eaters," art by Henry Flint, #1048–1049, 1997)
  - "A Walk In Gang Alley" (with Alex Ronald, in 2000 AD #1062, September 1997)
  - "Ojay" (with Alex Ronald, in Judge Dredd Megazine vol. 3 #34, October 1997)
  - "Simple Domestic" (with Steve Tappin, in Judge Dredd Megazine vol. 3 #35, November 1997)
  - "In the Year 2120" (with Jason Brashill, in 2000 AD #1077, January 1998)
  - "No More Jimmy Deans" (with Trevor Hairsine, in Judge Dredd Megazine vol. 3 #39, March 1998)
  - "Headbangers" (with Alex Ronald, in 2000 AD #1084, March 1998)
  - Judge Dredd (in Judge Dredd Megazine vol.3 #40–47, 1998)
  - "Revenge of the Taxidermist" (with Trevor Hairsine, in 2000 AD #1087–1089, 1998)
  - "Angel of Mercy" (with Alex Ronald, in 2000 AD #1090–1091, April 1998)
  - "Death Becomes Him" (with Alex Ronald, in 2000 AD #1114–1115, October 1998)
  - "Christmas Angel" (with Jason Brashill, in 2000 AD #1123–1124, December 1998)
  - "Revenge of the Taxidermist" (with Trevor Hairsine, in 2000 AD #1087–1089, 1998)
  - "The Scorpion Dance" (with John Burns, in 2000 AD #1125–1132, December 1998 – February 1999)
  - "The Contract" (with Cam Kennedy, in Judge Dredd Megazine vol. 3 #50, February 1999)
  - "Alien Town's Burning" (with Cam Kennedy, in 2000 AD #1133–1134, February–March 1999)
  - "There Be Dragons" (with Greg Staples, in Judge Dredd Megazine vol. 3 #51, March 1999)
  - "Banzai Battalion" (with Henry Flint, in 2000 AD #1135–1137, March 1999)
  - "The Doomsday Scenario":
    - Judge Dredd: Doomsday for Mega-City One (Hamlyn, 2001, ISBN 0-600-60306-7) collects:
      - "The Connection" (with Andrew Currie, in Judge Dredd Megazine vol. 3 #52–55, April–July 1999)
      - "Doomsday" (art by Colin Wilson and Mike Collins, in Judge Dredd Megazine vol. 3 #56–59, August–November 1999)
      - "Volt Face" (with Colin Wilson, 2000 AD #1167, October 1999)
    - Judge Dredd: Doomsday for Dredd (Hamlyn, 2001, ISBN 0-600-60307-5) collects:
      - "Return of the Assassin" (with Cam Kennedy, in 2000 AD #1141–1147, April–June 1999)
      - "The Trial" (art by Simon Davis, in 2000 AD #1148–1150, June 1999)
      - "Trial of Strength" (art by Neil Googe/Stephen Baskerville, in 2000 AD#1151–1152, July 1999)
      - "War Games" (with Neil Googe, Mike McMahon, Charlie Adlard, Andy Clarke/Stephen Baskerville, and Colin Wilson, in 2000 AD #1153–1159, July–September 1999)
      - "Endgame" (with Charlie Adlard, in 2000 AD #1160–1164, September–October 1999)
  - "Termination (With Extreme)" (with Alex Ronald, in 2000 AD #1139–1140, April 1999)
  - "A Night with Judge Death" (with art by Andy Clarke, in 2000 AD #1168, 1999)
  - "No Man's Land" (with Cam Kennedy, in 2000 AD #1183–1185, 2000)
  - "Blood Cadets" (with Simon Fraser, in 2000 AD #1186–1188, 2000)
  - "Lobsang Rampage" (with art by Andy Clarke, in Judge Dredd Megazine (vol. 3) #61, 2000)
  - "J. D. Megson" (with Henry Flint, in Judge Dredd Megazine vol.3 #63, 2000)
  - "Dead Ringer" (with Duncan Fegredo (64), Jock (65), Wayne Reynolds (66), Simon Coleby/Anthony Williams (67), Ben Oliver (68) and Richard Elson (69), in Judge Dredd Megazine vol.3 #64–69, 2000)
  - "Ten Years" (with Jock, in Judge Dredd Megazine vol.3 #70, 2000)
  - "Cold Comfort" (with Anthony Williams, in 2000 AD #1225, 2001)
  - "Star Drekk: A Space Fantasy" (with Anthony Williams, in 2000 AD #1232, 2001)
  - "Zoom Time" (with Simon Fraser, in 2000 AD #1311, 2002)
  - "My Beautiful Career" (with Simon Coleby, in Judge Dredd Megazine #215, 2004)
  - "After the Bombs" (with Jason Brashill, in 2000 AD #1420–1422, January 2005)
  - "PF" (with Arthur Ranson, in 2000 AD #1476, 2006)
  - Origins (160 pages, May 2006, ISBN 1-905437-23-4) collects:
    - "The Connection" (with Kev Walker, in 2000 AD #1500–1504, 2006)
    - "Origins" (with Carlos Ezquerra, in 2000 AD #1505–1519, 1529–1535, 2006–2007)
  - Tour of Duty: The Backlash (272 pages, September 2010, ISBN 978-1-907519-23-9) collects:
    - "The Streets of Dan Francisco" (with Rufus Dayglo, in 2000 AD #1520, 2007)
    - "Fifty-Year Man" (with Patrick Goddard, in 2000 AD #1536, 2007)
    - "Mutants in Mega-City One" (with Colin MacNeil, in 2000 AD #1542–1545, 2007)
    - "The Facility" (with Colin MacNeil, in 2000 AD #1546, 2007)
    - "The Secret of Mutant Camp 5" (with Colin MacNeil, in 2000 AD #1547–1548, 2007)
    - "The Spirit of Christmas" (with Colin MacNeil, in 2000 AD Prog 2008, 2007)
    - "Emphatically Evil: The Life and Crimes of PJ Maybe" (with Colin MacNeil, in 2000 AD #1569–1575, 2008)
    - "...Regrets" (with Nick Dyer, in 2000 AD #1577–1581, 2008)
    - "The Edgar Case" (with pencils by Patrick Goddard and inks by Lee Townsend, in 2000 AD # 1589–1595, 2008)
    - "Mutie Block" (with Kev Walker, in 2000 AD #1600–1603, 2008)
    - "Backlash" (with Carl Critchlow, in 2000 AD #1628–1633, 2009)
  - "The Sexmek Slasher" (with Vince Locke, in 2000 AD #1521, 2007)
  - "The Gingerbread Man" (with Henry Flint, in Judge Dredd Megazine #261–263, 2007)
  - "Mandroid: Instrument of War" (with Simon Coleby, in 2000 AD #1555–1556, 2007)
  - "Still Mental After All These Years" (with Cliff Robinson, in 2000 AD #1608, 2008)
  - "Ratfink" (with Peter Doherty, in Judge Dredd Megazine #273–277, 2008)
  - "The Ecstasy" (with Paul Marshall, in 2000 AD #1617–1626, January–March 2009)
  - Tour of Duty: Mega-City Justice (June 2011, ISBN 978-1-907992-39-1) collects:
    - "Under New Management" (with Carl Critchlow, in 2000 AD #1649, August 2009)
    - "Tour of Duty" (with Colin MacNeil, in 2000 AD #1569–1575, August–September 2008)
    - "Tour of Duty Interlude: Mega-City One" (with P. J. Holden, in 2000 AD #1656, October 2009)
    - "The New Deal" (with Mike Collins, in 2000 AD #1657)
    - "Snake" (with Mike Collins, in 2000 AD #1658)
    - "Pink Eyes" (with Mike Collins, in 2000 AD #1659–1663)
    - "Gore City" (with Colin MacNeil, in 2000 AD #1664–1667 and Prog 2010, 2009–2010)
    - "The Talented Mayor Ambrose," (with John Higgins (parts 1–5 and 11–12), Colin MacNeil (parts 6–10), and Mike Collins (part 13), in 2000 AD #1674–1686)
    - "Mega-City Justice" (with Carlos Ezquerra, in 2000 AD #1687–1693)
- Shako! (with co-author Pat Mills (1–4) and various artists, in 2000 AD #20–35, 1977, collected in Extreme Edition #18, 2006)
- Strontium Dog (with art by Carlos Ezquerra, except where indicated):
  - Search/Destroy Agency Files: Volume 1 (336 pages, January 2007, ISBN 1-905437-15-3) collects:
    - "Max Quirxx" (in Starlord #1–2, 1978)
    - "Papa Por-ka" (in Starlord #3–5, 1978)
    - "No Cure For Kansyr" (in Starlord #6–7, 1978)
    - "Planet Of The Dead" (in Starlord #8–10, 1978)
    - "Two-Faced Terror!" (in Starlord #12–15, 1978)
    - "Demon Maker" #17–19 (with art by Brendan McCarthy (17) and Ian Gibson (18–19), in Starlord #17–19, 1978)
    - "The Ultimate Weapon" (in Starlord #21–22, 1978)
    - "The Galaxy Killers" (in 2000 AD #86–94, 1978)
    - "Journey Into Hell" (in 2000 AD #104–118, 1979)
    - "Death's Head" (with co-author Alan Grant, in 2000 AD #178–181, 1980)
    - "The Schiklegruber Grab" (with co-author Alan Grant, in 2000 AD #182–188, 1980)
    - "Mutie's Luck" (with co-author Alan Grant, in 2000 AD #189, 1980)
    - "The Doc Quince Case" (with co-author Alan Grant, in 2000 AD #190–193, 1980–1981)
    - "The Bad Boys Bust" (with co-author Alan Grant, in 2000 AD #194–197, 1981)
  - Search/Destroy Agency Files: Volume 2 (with co-author Alan Grant, 288 pages, June 2007, ISBN 1-905437-29-3) collects:
    - "Portrait Of a Mutant" (in 2000 AD #200–206, 210–221, 1981)
    - "The Gronk Affair" (in 2000 AD #224–227, 1981)
    - "The Kid Knee Caper" (in 2000 AD #228–233, 1981)
    - "The Moses Incident" (in 2000 AD #335–345, 1983)
    - "The Killing" (in 2000 AD #350–359, 1984)
    - "Outlaw!" (in 2000 AD #363–385, 1984)
  - Search/Destroy Agency Files: Volume 3 (with co-author Alan Grant, 384 pages, September 2007, ISBN 1-905437-38-2) collects:
    - "The Big Bust Of ’49" (in 2000 AD #415–424, 1985)
    - "The Slavers Of Drule" (in 2000 AD #425–436, 1985)
    - "Max Bubba" (in 2000 AD #445–465, 1985–1986)
    - "Smiley's World" (in 2000 AD #466–467, 1986)
    - "Rage" (in 2000 AD #469–489, 1986)
    - "Incident On Mayjer Minor" (in 2000 AD #490–496, 1986)
    - "Warzone!" (in 2000 AD #497–499, 1986)
  - Search/Destroy Agency Files: Volume 4 (with co-author Alan Grant, 352 pages, January 2008, ISBN 1-905437-51-X) collects:
    - "Bitch" (in 2000 AD #505–529, 1987)
    - "The Royal Affair" (in 2000 AD #532–536, 1987)
    - "A Sorry Case" (with art by Colin MacNeil, in 2000 AD #540–543, 1987)
    - "The Rammy" (in 2000 AD #544–553, 1987)
    - "The Stone Killers" (written by Grant alone; 2000 AD #560–572, 1988)
    - "Incident On Zeta" (written by Grant alone; plot suggested by Carlos Ezquerra; 2000 AD #573, 1988)
    - "The No-Go Job" (written by Grant alone; art by Simon Harrison; 2000 AD #580–587, 1988)
    - "Fever" (art by Kim Raymond; 2000 AD Annual 1987)
    - "Complaint" (2000 AD Annual 1988)
    - "Incident at the End of the World" (art by Keith Page; 2000 AD Annual 1991, 1990)
    - "Assault on Trigol 3" (written by Steve MacManus, art by Rob Moran; 2000 AD Sci-fi Special 1989)
    - "An Untold Tale of Johnny Alpha" (written by Peter Hogan, art by John Ridgway; 2000 AD Sci-fi Special 1992)
  - The Final Solution (160 pages, May, 2008, ISBN 1-905437-63-3)
    - "The Final Solution" (part 1 - written by Grant alone; art by Simon Harrison; 2000 AD #600–606, 615–621, 636–641, 645–647, 1988–89)
    - "The Final Solution" (part 2 - written by Grant alone; art by Colin MacNeil; 2000 AD #682–687, 1990)
    - "Incident at the Birth of the Universe" (written by Grant alone; art by Kev Walker; 2000 AD Winter Special 1988)
    - "The Town that Died of Shame" (written by Grant alone; art by Brendan McCarthy and Colin MacNeil; 2000 AD Sci-Fi Special 1988)
    - "Judge Dredd: Top Dogs" (art by Colin MacNeil; Judge Dredd Annual 1991, 1990)
    - "The Kreeler Conspiracy" (in Prog 2000, 2000 AD #1174–1180, 1195–1199, 1999–2000)
    - "The Sad Case" (in Prog 2001, 2000)
    - "Roadhouse" (in 2000 AD #1300–1308, 2002)
    - "The Tax Dodge" (in 2000 AD #1350–1358, 2003)
    - "The Headly Foot Job" (in 2000 AD #1400–1403, 2004)
    - "Traitor To His Kind" (in 2000 AD #1406–1415, 2004)
    - "A Shaggy Dog Story" (in Prog 2006, 2000 AD #1469–1472, 2005–2006)
    - "The Glum Affair" (in Prog 2008, 2000 AD #1567–1576, 2007–2008)
    - "Blood Moon" (with co-artist Hector Ezquerra, in 2000 AD #1617-1628, 2009)
    - "The Mork Whisperer" (in 2000 AD #1651–1660, 2010)
    - "The Life and Death of Jonny Alpha" (in 2000 AD #1689–1699, 2010)
    - "The Life and Death of Jonny Alpha Book II: The Project" (in 2000 AD Prog 2012, #1764–1771, 2011–2012)
    - "The Life and Death of Jonny Alpha Book III: Mutant Spring" (in 2000 AD Prog 2013, #1813–1821, 2012–2013)
    - "The Life and Death of Jonny Alpha Book IV: Dogs of War" (in 2000 AD Prog 2014, #1862–1870, 2013–2014)
    - "The Stix Fix" (in 2000 AD #1924–1933, 2015)
    - "Repo Men" (in 2000 AD #1961–1971, 2015–2016)
  - Uncollected:
    - "The Son" (in 2000 AD #2073–2081, 2018)
- Robo-Hunter (art by Ian Gibson):
  - Robo-Hunter (in 2000 AD # 76–85 & 100–112, 1978–79)
  - Robo-Hunter (in 2000 AD # 152–174, 1980)
  - Robo-Hunter (in 2000 AD # 259–272, 275–281 & 283–288, 1982)
  - Robo-Hunter (in 2000 AD # 292–307, 1982–83)
  - Robo-Hunter (in 2000 AD # 312–334, 1983)
  - Robo-Hunter (in 2000 AD # 435–443, 1985)
- Ace Trucking Co. (with co-author Alan Grant and art by Massimo Belardinelli, unless noted):
  - The Complete Ace Trucking Co. Volume 1 (320 pages ISBN 1-905437-77-3) collects:
    - "The Kleggs" (in 2000 AD #232–236, 1981)
    - "Hell's Pocket" (with art by Ian Gibson, in 2000 AD #239–243, 1981)
    - "Lugjack" (in 2000 AD #244–250, 1982)
    - "The Great Mush Rush" (in 2000 AD #251–258, 1982)
    - "The Ughbug Bloos" (in 2000 AD #259, 1982)
    - "Last Lug To Abbo Dabbo" (in 2000 AD #260–267, 1982)
    - "Joobaloo" (in 2000 AD #268–272, 1982)
    - "Too Many Bams" (in 2000 AD #273–278, 1982)
    - "The Kloistar Run" (in 2000 AD #279–285, 1982)
    - "Stoop Coop Soup" (in 2000 AD #288–293, 1982)
  - The Complete Ace Trucking Co. Volume 2 (336 pages ISBN 1-905437-98-6) collects:
    - "Bamfeezled" (2000AD Sci-Fi Special 1982)
    - "On The Dangle" (in 2000 AD #378–386, 1984)
    - "Strike!" (in 2000 AD #387–390 and 392–400, 1984–1985)
    - "The Croakside Trip" (in 2000 AD #428–433, 1985)
    - "Stowaway Lugjacker" (in 2000 AD Annual 1986, 1985)
    - "Whatever Happened to Ace Garp?" (in 2000 AD #451, 1986)
    - "The Doppelgarp" (in 2000 AD #452–472, 1986)
    - "The Garpetbaggers" (in 2000 AD #475–483 and 485–498, 1986)
    - "The Homecoming" (in 2000 AD Annual 1989, 1988)
- Anderson: Psi Division (with co-author Alan Grant):
  - "The Mind of Edward Bottlebum" (with art by Ian Gibson, Judge Dredd Annual 1985, 1984)
  - "Revenge" (with art by Brett Ewins (1–7), Cliff Robinson (8–10, 12) and Robin Smith (11), in 2000 AD #416–427, 1985)
- The Helltrekkers (with José Ortiz, in 2000 AD # 387–415, 1984–1985)
- Tales from Mega-City One:
  - Tales from Mega-City One (in 2000 AD # 523, 525–26, 532–34 & 539, 1987)
  - Tales from Mega-City One (in 2000 AD # 605, 1988)
- Chopper
  - "Soul on Fire" (with Colin MacNeil, in 2000 AD #594–597, 1988)
  - "Song of the Surfer" (with Colin MacNeil, in 2000 AD #654–665, 1989)
  - "The Big Meg" (with Dylan Teague, in 2000 AD #1387–1394, 2004)
- The Dead Man (in 2000 AD # 650–662, 1989–90)
- America (with Colin MacNeil):
  - "America" (in Judge Dredd Megazine vol.1 #1–7, 1990–1091)
  - "Fading of the Light" (in Judge Dredd Megazine vol.3 #20–25, 1996–1097)
- Judge Death:
  - "Young Death" (with Peter Doherty, in Judge Dredd Megazine vol.1 #1–12, 1990–1991, collected in Young Death: Boyhood of a Superfiend, May 2008, ISBN 1-905437-65-X)
  - "Tea With Mrs. Gunderson" (with Dean Ormston, in Judge Dredd Megazine vol.2 #15, 1992)
  - My Name is Death (with Frazer Irving, 112 pages, 2005, ISBN 1-904265-73-1) collects:
    - "My Name is Death" (in 2000 AD #1289–1294, 2002)
    - "The Wilderness Days" (in Judge Dredd Megazine #209–216, 2003–2004)
- Al's Baby (with Carlos Ezquerra, reprinted in Extreme Edition #16, 2006):
  - "Al's Baby" (in Judge Dredd Megazine vol.1 #4–15, 1991)
  - "Blood on the Bib" (in Judge Dredd Megazine vol.2 #16–24, 1992–1993)
  - "Public Enemy No. 1" (in 2000 AD #1034–1044, 1997)
- Mean Machine:
  - "Travels with Muh Shrink" (with Richard Dolan, in 2000 AD # 730–736, 1991)
  - "Son of Mean Machine" (with Carl Critchlow, in Judge Dredd Megazine vol.2 # 63–72 & 82, 1994–1995)
  - "Visiting Time" (with John Hicklenton, in Judge Dredd Megazine vol.2 #82, 1995)
  - "Angel Heart" (with David Millgate, in Judge Dredd Megazine #218–220, 2004)
- Brit-Cit Babes (with Steve Sampson, in Judge Dredd Megazine vol.1 #16–20, 1992)
- Button Man:
  - "Book I: The Killing Game" (with Arthur Ranson, in 2000 AD #780–791, 1992)
  - "Book II: Confession" (with Arthur Ranson, in 2000 AD #904–919, 1994)
  - "Book 3" (with Arthur Ranson, in 2000 AD prog 2001 & #1223–1233, 2001)
  - "Book IV: The Hitman's Daughter" (with Frazer Irving, in 2000 AD #1551-1566, 2007)
- I Was a Teenage Tax Consultant (with Ian Gibson, in 2000 AD # 1050–1059, 1997)
- Predator vs. Judge Dredd (with art by Enrique Alcatera, in Judge Dredd Megazine vol.3 #36–38, Dark Horse, 3-issue mini-series, 1997, collected in tpb, 80 pages, Titan, 1998, ISBN 1-84023-021-5, Dark Horse Comics, 1999, ISBN 1-56971-345-6)
- The Balls Brothers (with Kev Walker):
  - "Heroes for Hire" (in 2000 AD #1128–1131, 1999)
  - "Balls to Biloxi" (in 2000 AD #1141–1147, 1999)
- Banzai Battalion (80 pages, March 2005, ISBN 1-904265-11-1) collects:
  - "The Fitz" (with Ian Gibson, in 2000 AD #1257–1262, 2001)
  - "Save the Fitz!" (with Ian Gibson, in 2000 AD prog 2003, 2002)
  - "Robot Wars" (with Steve Roberts, in 2000 AD #1501–1506, 2006)
- Surfer (with Colin MacNeil, in Judge Dredd Megazine #439–444, 449–454, 2022–2023)
- Spector (with Carlos Ezquerra and Dan Cornwell, in Judge Dredd Megazine #455–464, 2023–2024)
- Rok the World (with Dan Cornwell, in Judge Dredd Megazine #488–ongoing, 2026)

=== Eagle ===
- "Dan Dare: The Return of the Mekon", co-written with Pat Mills and Barrie Tomlinson, art by Gerry Embleton, Ian Kennedy, #1–33, 1982
- "Joe Soap", co-written with Alan Grant, photo-strip, #12–22, 1982
- "Manix", co-written with Alan Grant (credited to Keith Law), photo-strip, #24–31, 1982
- "Doomlord", co-written with Alan Grant, photo-strip, then traditional comic strip drawn by Eric Bradbury, 1982–1991
- "The House of Daemon", co-written with Alan Grant, art by José Ortiz, #25–47, 1982–83
- "Gil Hazzard – Codename Scorpio", co-written with Alan Grant, #49–67, 1983
- "The Fists of Danny Pyke", co-written with Alan Grant (credited to D. Spence), art by John M. Burns
- "Bloodfang", (credited to F. Martin Candor), art by Jim Baikie and Carlos Cruz, #116–127 and 129–158, 1983–84
- "Computer Warrior", co-written with Alan Grant, 1985–88

=== Scream! ===
- "The Thirteenth Floor", co-written with Alan Grant (credited to Ian Holland), art by José Ortiz, 1984; continued in Eagle
- "Monster", co-written with Alan Grant (credited to R. Clark), art by Jesus Redondo, 1984; continued in Eagle

=== Roy of the Rovers ===
- "Dan Harker's War", co-written with Alan Grant, 1985

== Marvel Comics ==
- Doctor Who, with co-writer Pat Mills and art by Dave Gibbons, in Doctor Who Magazine #1–16 & 19–34, 1979–1980, collected in The Iron Legion, 2004, ISBN 1-904159-37-0:
  - "The Iron Legion" (#1–8)
  - "City of the Damned" (#9–16)
  - "The Star Beast" (#19–26)
  - "Dogs of Doom" (#27–34)
- The Chronicles of Genghis Grimtoad, with co-writer Alan Grant and art by Ian Gibson, in Strip (Marvel UK), 1990, collected as a Marvel Graphic Novel
- Clive Barker's Night Breed #1-4 (1990)
- The Last American, with co-author Alan Grant and art by Mike McMahon, 4-issue mini-series, Epic Comics, 1990–1991, TPB, Com.x, 2004
- Punisher: Blood on the Moors (1991)
- Punisher: Die Hard in the Big Easy (1992)

== DC Comics ==
Work at DC Comics, and their imprints include:

- Outcasts with co-author Alan Grant and pencils by Cam Kennedy, 12-issue limited series, DC Comics 1987–1988
- Detective Comics #583-587 (1988)
- Batman/Judge Dredd: Judgement on Gotham (1991)
- Batman #477-478 (1992)
- Batman vs. Judge Dredd: Vendetta in Gotham DC/Fleetway (1993)
- Lobo: Unamerican Gladiators #1-4 (1993)
- Chain Gang War, created with Dave Johnson. DC Comics 1993–1994. Ongoing monthly series cancelled after 12 issues.
- Jude Dredd: Legends of the Law #1-4 (1994-1995)
- Bob, the Galactic Bum, with co-author Alan Grant and art by Carlos Ezquerra, 4-issue mini-series, DC 1995
- Batman/Judge Dredd: The Ultimate Riddle, DC/Fleetway 1995
- Lobo/Judge Dredd: Psycho Bikers vs. the Mutants From Hell (1996)
- Batman: Legends of the Dark Knight #101, 172-176 art by Carlos Ezquerra and Chris Brunner, DC (1997–2004)
- A History of Violence, with Vince Locke, Paradox Press 1997
- Batman/Judge Dredd: Die Laughing, with co-author Alan Grant, art by Glenn Fabry and Jim Murray, two-issue mini-series, DC 1998

== Dark Horse Comics ==
Wagner has also worked at Dark Horse Comics on a number of their licensed properties:

- Aliens: Berserker, with Paul Mendoza and Andy Mushynsky, 4-issue mini-series, Dark Horse, 1995, included in Aliens Omnibus, Volume 4, 384 pages, June 2008, ISBN 1-59307-926-5
- Star Wars:
  - Star Wars Omnibus: Shadows of the Empire (408 pages, Dark Horse, February 2010, ISBN 1-59582-434-0, Titan Books, April 2010, ISBN 1-84856-599-2) includes:
    - Shadows of the Empire, with pencils by Kilian Plunkett and John Nadeau and inks by P. Craig Russell, 6-issue mini-series, 1996, TPB, 1997, ISBN 1-56971-181-X
  - Star Wars Omnibus: Boba Fett (494 pages, Dark Horse, April 2010, ISBN 1-59582-418-9, Titan Books, July 2010, ISBN 1-84856-616-6) includes:
    - Boba Fett, with Cam Kennedy, 3-issue mini-series, Dark Horse Comics, 1995–1996, TPB, Boba Fett: Death, Lies, & Treachery, 1998, ISBN 1-56971-311-1
    - Boba Fett: Enemy of the Empire (112 pages, 1999, ISBN 1-56971-407-X) collects:
      - "Enemy of the Empire", with Ian Gibson, 4-issue mini-series
      - "Salvage", with pencils by John Nadeau and inks by Jim Amash, Boba Fett ½ in Wizard Magazine
    - "Sacrifice", with Cam Kennedy, in Empire #7, 2003, collected in Boba Fett: Man with a Mission, Dark Horse, March 2007, ISBN 1-59307-707-6
  - "The Jabba Tape", with Kilian Plunkett, one-shot, 1998
- Xena: Warrior Princess #1–8 (1999–2000):
  - The Warrior Way of Death, with pencils by Joyce Chin, Clint Hilinski, Mike Deodato and Ivan Reis and inks by Walden Wong, Mike Deodato, Grant Nelson, TPB, collects Xena #1–3, 2000, ISBN 1-56971-452-5)
  - Slave, with pencils by Joyce Chin and Mike Deodato and inks by Clint Hilinski, Fabiano Neves and Walden Wong, TPB, collects Xena #4–6, 2000, ISBN 1-56971-471-1
  - Blood and Shadows, with pencils by Davide Fabbri and Mike Deodato and inks by Mark Heike, Neil Nelson, TPB, collects Xena #7–10, 2001, ISBN 1-56971-521-1

== Others ==
- The Bogie Man, with co-author Alan Grant and art by Robin Smith:
  - The Bogie Man, John Brown Publishing, 128 pages, 1991, ISBN 1-870870-21-2
  - Chinatoon, Toxic! #2–9, 1991, started by Cam Kennedy, redrawn and completed by Smith, Atomeka Press, 112 pages, 1993, ISBN 1-85809-006-7
  - The Manhattan Project, Toxic! #11–21, 1991, Tundra Publishing, 52 pages, 1992, ISBN 1-85809-001-6
  - The Bogie Man, collects the first volume and Chinatoon, Pocket Books, 224 pages, 1998, ISBN 0-671-00923-0
  - "Return to Casablanca", Judge Dredd Megazine #227–233, 2005
- The Crow, Top Dollar Comics, Kitchen Sink Press:
  - City of Angels, with co-author David Goyer, and art by Dean Ormston (#1) and Phil Hester (#2–3), 3-issue mini-series, 1995, TPB, Titan Books, 1996, ISBN 1-85286-757-4
  - Dead Time, with co-author James O'Barr, and art by Alex Maleev, 3-issue mini-series, 1996, TPB, 96 pages, Titan Books, 1997, ISBN 1-85286-740-X, Kitchen Sink, ISBN 0-87816-547-9
- Rok of the Reds, with Alan Grant (co-writer) and Dan Cornwell (artist), Black Hearted Press, 2018
- Rok the God, with Alan Grant and Dan Cornwell, self-published, 2020
- Rok the World, with Dan Cornwell, Judge Dredd Megazine #488–ongoing, 2026
