= Bloodfang =

British comic book character

- Bloodfang on the cover of The Best of Eagle Monthly #6, dated October 1988.

Character information
- First appearance: Eagle (9 June 1984)

In-story information
- Species: Tyrannosaurus
- Place of origin: Earth

Publication information
- Publisher: IPC Magazines
- Schedule: Weekly
- Title(s): Eagle; 9 June to 25 August 1984; 8 September 1984 to 30 March 1985
- Formats: Original material for the series has been published as a strip in the comics anthology(s) Eagle.
- Genre: Action/adventure
- Publication date: 9 June 1984 – 30 March 1985

Creative team
- Writer(s): John Wagner and Alan Grant (Note: Credited as 'F. Martin Candor'.)
- Artist(s): Jim Baikie; Carlos Cruz González; Vanyo
- Editor(s): Dave Hunt

Reprints
- Title(s): The Best of Eagle Monthly #6

Bloodfang is a British comic character, appearing in strips published by IPC Magazines. The character featured in British comic stories published in the weekly anthology Eagle from 9 June 1984 to 30 March 1985, written by John Wagner and Alan Grant and drawn by Jim Baikie, Carlos Cruz González and Vanyo. The story followed the eponymous Tyrannosaurus rex, initially in prehistoric times and then later in the year 2150.

== Creation ==
"Bloodfang" was one of many stories submitted to the revived Eagle by writing duo John Wagner and Alan Grant. The pair were such prolific contributors to IPC's output that managing editor John Sanders insisted they use pseudonyms to mask their level of contribution; Grant would later recall the pair enjoyed coming up with the pen-names. For "Bloodfang" the pair chose to be credited as 'F. Martin Candor'; Martin was a shopkeeper and Candor a mechanic, both known (and disliked) by Grant, with the 'F' being an obscene dismissal of the pair.

The first 12-part storyline, published 9 June to 25 August 1984, was illustrated by Jim Baikie, who had recently worked with Alan Moore on "Skizz" in IPC's 2000 AD. After a one-week break as material from the cancelled Scream! was incorporated into Eagle, the second arc was drawn by Carlos Cruz González from 8 September 1984 to 2 February 1985, with the final episodes drawn by Vicente Vaño Ibarra and Eduardo Vaño Ibarra under their Vanyo identity. Due to an editorial error, José Ortiz was incorrectly credited for the 8 December 1984 instalment. The serial was effectively halted by an influx of strips from the cancelled Tiger. A standalone story also appeared in the 1985 Eagle Holiday Special.

Like many IPC stories, "Bloodfang" was sold for overseas publication, and was printed by Aventures & Voyages in French as part of the anthology Akim in 1988, renamed "Croc-Rouge". The same year the first arc of the story was reprinted in Fleetway Publications' The Best of Eagle Monthly #6, dated October 1988. In 1998, the rights to the strips created for Eagle – including "Bloodfang" – were purchased from Egmont Publishing by the Dan Dare Corporation.

== Plot summary ==
Bloodfang hatches from his egg a hundred million years ago. He promptly kills his siblings and is raised by his mother Karka until she is killed in a fight with the tyrannosaur pack leader Blackheart – Bloodfang's father. During the fight, Bloodfang is wounded in the face by Blackheart, leaving him with permanent scars. Bloodfang flees, and becomes an outcast from the pack. Forced to fend for himself, the young tyrannosaur initially struggles to survive and nearly starves. His first meal without his mother's assistance consists of carrion. However, when other dinosaurs (four sauroctoni) try to steal his meal from him, Bloodfang cunningly bides his time until they have gorged themselves, and then attacks them when they are vulnerable, killing two and driving the others away.

Over the next four years he grows to become six metres tall and weigh ten tonnes, by which time he has learned to be a ferocious fighter, stronger than most adults of his species. Bloodfang returns to his pack during mating season, and kills a rival male tyrannosaur to steal his harem of females. Bloodfang quickly establishes his status as one of the strongest of the pack, but backs down when challenged by Blackheart. During a final reckoning, Bloodfang kills Blackheart and usurps him as leader of the pack, who then feast on Blackheart's corpse.

In the second series, time-travellers from 2150 – hunting dinosaurs for meat with which to feed the people of the 22nd century – attack Bloodfang's pack. Bloodfang fights back but is eventually captured, brought to 2150 and kept in a zoo. Escaping, he goes on a rampage, killing many humans, until he returns to his own time.

== Reception ==
On the editorial page of the Best of Eagle Monthly reprint, fictional editor Max referred to the story as "one of the strangest ever told in Eagle". Nostalgia book A 1980s Childhood identified it as one of the best strips in the revived Eagle.

== See also ==
- Flesh (comics), a series about dinosaurs and time-travel in 2000 AD, also published by IPC Magazines.
