= I Was a Teenage Tax Consultant =

I Was a Teenage Tax Conultant
- Created by: John Wagner; Ian Gibson

Publication information
- Publisher: Originally IPC Media (Fleetway) until 1999, thereafter Rebellion Developments
- Schedule: Weekly
Title(s)
2000 AD
- Genre: Science fiction
- Publication date: July – September 1997

Creative team
- Writer(s): John Wagner
- Artist(s): Ian Gibson
- Editor(s): Tharg (David Bishop)

I Was a Teenage Tax Consultant is a series published in the British comic anthology 2000 AD in 1997. It was created by John Wagner and Ian Gibson and was advertised as one of the strangest stories ever published in 2000 AD. The series was originally scripted in 1991 and is, unlike most series published in 2000 AD, creator-owned.

The opening splash page doubles an imitation film poster that includes billings for the characters and creators as well as a notice that the artwork is in “Superwidestrip”, a spoof of 1950s widescreen film formats like CinemaScope. The artwork for I Was a Teenage Tax Consultant was not completed before the comic changed size to A4 so every page had to include a banner across the top of each page.

== Plot summary ==
The premise is a parody of the 1957 horror film I Was a Teenage Werewolf. A rebel biker called Jimmy Root is bitten by rabid tax consultant. Afterwards, whenever there is a full moon, Jimmy transforms into a nerdish tax consultant who harangues people in a complicated legalese about their finances. After a number of transformations and a visit to an institution dedicated to grotesque occupational disorders Jimmy and his girlfriend abscond to a remote island where his tax consultant alter-ego cannot pester people.
