= José Ortiz (comics) =

Spanish comics artist (1932–2013)

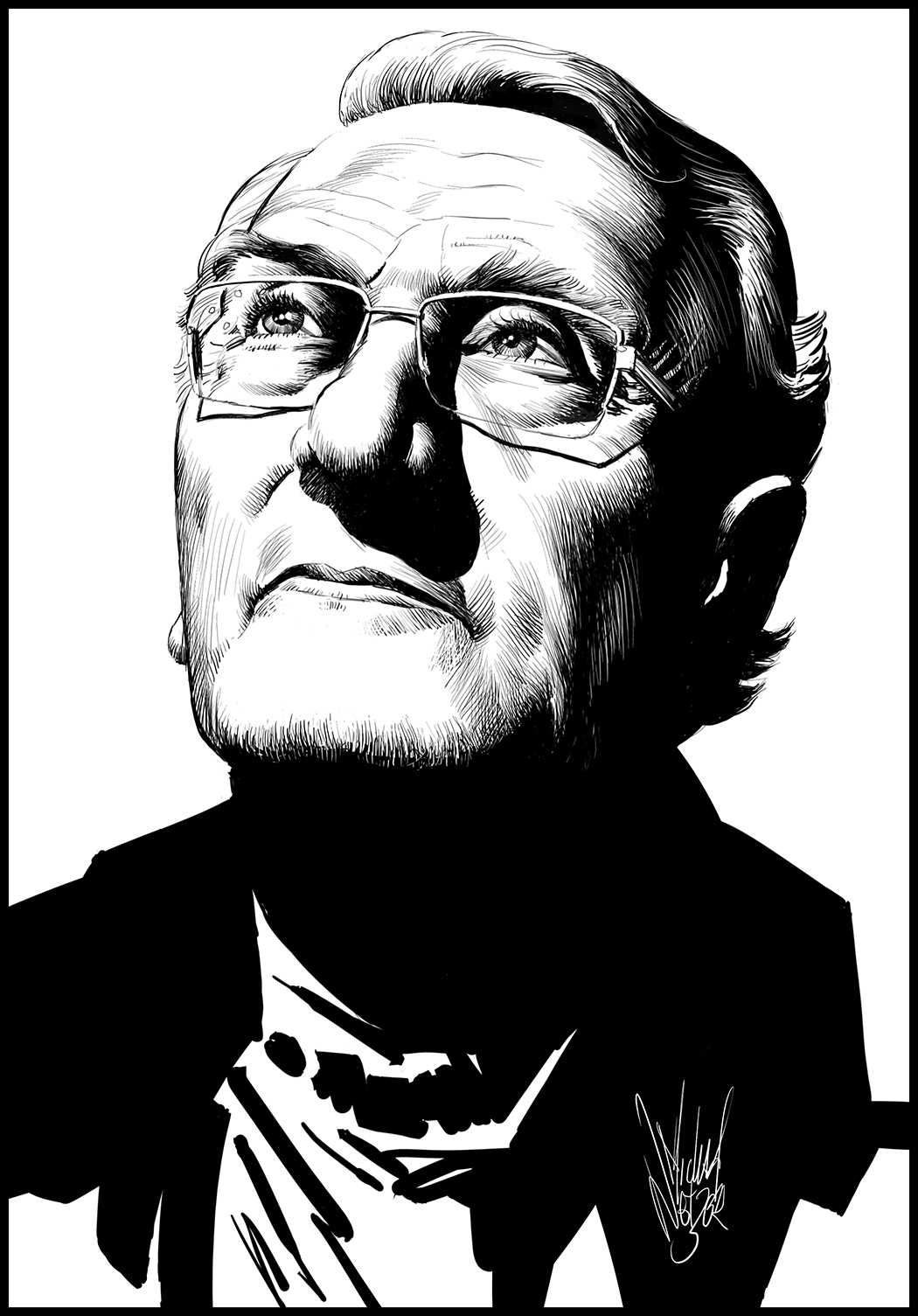
- José Ortiz by Michael Netzer
- Born: José Ortiz Moya; 1 September 1932 Cartagena, Region of Murcia, Spain
- Died: 23 December 2013 (aged 81) Valencia, Spain
- Areas: Penciller, Inker
- Pseudonyms: José Ortiz; Jaimie Ortiz
- Notable works: Hombre; Jack el Destripador; Morgan; Burton & Cyb

José Ortiz Moya (1 September 1932 – 23 December 2013) was a Spanish comics artist, best known for several collaborations with Antonio Segura, such as the series Hombre.

== Biography ==
José Ortiz was born in Cartagena, in the Region of Murcia.

His career began at an early age, winning an artistic tournament held by the Spanish magazine Chicos in 1948. After a period of making pocket sized comics, he created the series Sigur el Vikingo and Johnny Fogata in 1959, and Carolynn Baker for the English newspaper Daily Express in 1962.

Ortiz joined Warren Publishing in 1974 due to his connections with the Valencia studio of Selecciones Ilustradas. He would remain with Warren until 1983 and drew more stories for that company (approximately 120) than any other artist. His work included the series Apocalypse, Night of the Jackass and Coffin in Eerie, as well as Pantha in Vampirella and numerous stand alone stories. Ortiz would also draw Vampirella herself in issues 35 and 36 that title. He won the award for 'Best All Around Artist' at Warren in 1974.

A sample of Jose Ortiz's work, from Eerie #65.

Following this period in the U.S. comics industry making horror comics, he returned to Spain and formed a lasting and fertile working partnership with Antonio Segura in 1981, initiated by the serial publication of Hombre, a post-apocalyptic saga, in the magazine Cimoc.

By 1983, Ortiz and Segura joined with several other artists including Leopold Sánchez, Manfred Sommer and Jordi Bernet, to form the short-lived publishing house Metropol with the artists' interest in mind, responsible for three comics magazines, Metropol, Mocambo and KO cómics.

During the 1980s Ortiz also produced work for a number of British publications including The Tower King and The House of Daemon for Eagle and The Thirteenth Floor for Scream!. He then moved over to 2000 AD in 1984 where he contributed to a number of stories, mostly on Rogue Trooper.

In addition to the continued run of Hombre, Ortiz and Segura created Ives and Las Mil Caras de Jack el Destripador (The Thousand Faces of Jack the Ripper) the following years, later renaming Ives to Morgan. In 1987, they began the humorous science fiction series Burton & Cyb, followed in 1990 by the series Juan el Largo.

From 1993, Ortiz focused on the Italian comics market, illustrating stories for Tex Willer, Ken Parker and Magico Vento.

He died at Valencia on 23 December 2013.

== Bibliography ==
=== French titles ===
- Le petit sauvage (1980, Editions du Triton, ISBN 84-85138-13-9)
- L'apocalypse (1982, Campus Editions, ISBN 84-85138-13-9)
- Hombre, with Antonio Segura
  - HS1. Une humanité errante (1987, Kesselring, ISBN 2-88159-020-9)
  - HS2. L'héritage de l'humanité (1988, Kesselring, ISBN 2-88159-030-6)
  - T1. L'ombre du désespoir (1989, Magic strip, ISBN 2-8035-0190-2)
  - T2. L'ultime ennemi (1989, Magic strip, ISBN 2-8035-0202-X)
  - T3. Attila (1991, Soleil Productions, ISBN 2-87764-055-8)
  - T4. Attila et les sept nains (1992, Soleil Productions, ISBN 2-87764-110-4)
  - T5. Les vautours (1994, Soleil Productions, ISBN 2-87764-110-4)
  - T1. La Genèse - Une tombe en béton (1993, Soleil Productions, ISBN 2-87764-134-1)
  - T2. La Genèse - La vallée de la vengeance (1993, Soleil Productions, ISBN 2-87764-135-X)
  - T3. La Genèse - Le chasseur (1993, Soleil Productions, ISBN 2-87764-149-X)
- Burton & Cyb, with Antonio Segura
  - 1. Escrocs de l'espace (1989, Comics USA, ISBN 2-87695-051-0)
  - 2. Loubards des étoiles (1989, Comics USA, ISBN 2-87695-101-0)
  - 3. Gangsters galactiques (1991, Comics USA, ISBN 2-87695-134-7)
  - 4. Pourritures planétaires (1992, Comics USA, ISBN 2-87695-176-2)
- Morgan, with Antonio Segura
  - 1. Repose en paix (1989, Les Humanoïdes Associés, ISBN 2-7316-0600-2)
  - 2. Le Contrat (1991, Soleil Productions, ISBN 2-87764-060-4)
  - 3. Le Zombie (1991, Soleil Productions, ISBN 2-87764-069-8)
  - 4. Don Gaetano (1992, Soleil Productions, ISBN 2-87764-099-X)
  - 5. Petits nègres et négriers (1993, Soleil Productions, ISBN 2-87764-138-4)
  - 6. Les Vampires (1993, Soleil Productions, ISBN 2-87764-142-2)
- Jean le Long (Juan el Largo) with Antonio Segura
  - 1. Jean le Long (1990, Vaisseau d'argent, ISBN 2-87757-027-4)
  - 2. Le lac des emeraudes (1991, Vaisseau d'argent, ISBN 2-87757-045-2)
- Jack l'éventreur (Jack el Destripador) with Antonio Segura (1992, Magic Strip, ISBN 2-8035-0277-1)

=== British titles ===
British comics work includes:

- The Tower King (with Alan Hebden, in Eagle #1-24, 1982)
- The House of Daemon (with John Wagner/Alan Grant, in Eagle #25-47, 1982–1983)
- The Fifth Horseman: A Thaddius Thorn Story (with Alan Hebden, in Eagle #49-69, 1983)
- The Amstor Computer:
  - "714299 - The Computer Murder" (with B. J. Tomlinson, in Eagle #79, 1983)
  - "221 - Nightmare!" (with Alan Hebden, in Eagle #91, 1983)
- Tharg's Future Shocks:
  - "The War Game!" (as Jaimie Ortiz, with Alan Hebden, in 2000 AD #386, 1984)
  - "Time to Wake Up" (with Larry Watson, in 2000 AD #609, 1989)
- The Helltrekkers (with John Wagner/Alan Grant, as F. Martin Candor, in 2000 AD #387, 1984)
- Rogue Trooper (as Jaimie Ortiz):
  - "Return of Rogue Trooper" (with Gerry Finley-Day, in 2000 AD #410-419, 1985)
  - "Antigen of Horst" (with Gerry Finley-Day, in 2000 AD #422-426, 428–432, 1985)
  - "Return to Milli-Com" (with Gerry Finley-Day, in 2000 AD #444-449, 1985)
  - "The Fanatics" (with Peter Milligan, in 2000 AD Sci-Fi Special 1986)
  - "Nort by Northwest" (with Peter Milligan, in 2000AD Annual 1987, 1987)
- Judge Dredd: "Night of the Ripper" (with John Wagner/Alan Grant, in 2000 AD #517, 1987)
- A collection of the Scream! story The 13th Floor was published in Ireland in 2007
