= The Tower King =

British comic book story

- Mick Tempest on the cover of the 15 May 1982 edition of Eagle, art by John Higgins.

Publication information
- Publisher: IPC Magazines
- Schedule: Weekly
- Title(s): Eagle; 27 March to 4 September 1982
- Formats: Original material for the series has been published as a strip in the comics anthology(s) Eagle.
- Genre: Science fiction
- Publication date: 27 March – 4 September 1982
- Main character(s): Mick Tempest

Creative team
- Writer(s): Alan Hebden
- Artist(s): José Ortiz
- Editor(s): Dave Hunt

"The Tower King" is a British comic science fiction strip, appearing in titles published by IPC Magazines. The story was published in the weekly comic, Eagle, from 27 March to 4 September 1982, written by Alan Hebden, with art by José Ortiz. The story was set in a dystopian London, where society has broken down.

== Creation ==
While the relaunched Eagle included a mix of photo and conventional picture strips. "The Tower King" was one of the latter. It was written by IPC stalwart Alan Hebden, who had experience writing for Battle Picture Weekly (including creating Major Eazy) and 2000 AD. José Ortiz provided the art; while the strip was in black-and-white, the web offset printing method used for Eagle meant he was able to give the art a grey wash, enhancing the atmosphere and detail. The strip's creators made use of the opportunity by juxtapositioning jarring visual elements, such as historic London landmarks strewn with the rubble of modern buildings, or soldiers in patchwork armour complete with pocket watches and police helmets, armed with both halberds and grenades.

== Publication history ==
The story debuted in the launch issue of the new Eagle, dated 27 March 1982 and continued until the 4 September 1982 edition - when it was effectively replaced by another Ortiz-drawn strip, "The House of Daemon".

In 1998, the rights to the strips created for Eagle – including "House of Daemon" – were purchased from Egmont Publishing by the Dan Dare Corporation. In 2014, Hibernia Books licensed "The Tower King" and produced a collected edition with a foreword by 2000 AD artist Leigh Gallagher, initially in a print run of 200 copies. A second limited run followed in 2017. In 2020, Hibernia produced another short run, along with another run of their collection of "The House of Daemon".

== Plot ==
The story is set in a post-apocalyptic modern-day London. Following from a nuclear war, a malfunctioning solar-powered satellite, somehow bathes the Earth in radiation that makes the production of electricity in any form impossible. Without heating, transport, food, or communication, and in the middle of a heavy winter, London swiftly falls into mass panic, resulting in pseudo-medieval anarchy; the state of the rest of Britain or other countries is not explored during the strip.

Unlike many of the early Eagle strips, The Tower King is in drawn rather than photographic format; the strip's creators made use of the opportunity by juxtapositioning jarring visual elements, such as historic London landmarks strewn with the rubble of modern buildings, or soldiers in patchwork armor complete with pocket watches and police helmets, armed with both halberds and grenades.

The main character is Mick Tempest, a natural-born soldier and leader, with a down-to-earth demeanour. He organises his neighbourhood into a group, sharing protection and food in the face of rioters and looters, and then negotiates entry into the Tower of London for protection, Britain's monarchy apparently having been killed in the chaos. He is captured in an assault on the Tower by Lord Spencer, a self-styled feudal warlord, who tries to publicly behead Tempest on Tower Green when he refuses to swear fealty. They are attacked by Tube Rats, a vicious group of cannibalistic survivors who had taken over the defunct London Underground system; in the battle, Tempest proves his worth to Spencer as an equal rather than a lieutenant.

Tempest, Spencer, and their army slowly regain control over parts of central London, encountering a hospital containing medical staff who had become insane due to events and have started a cult around worship of human organs; a group called the Wreckers who drive hand-cranked diesel-powered tanks and trains; and an 'electric temple' inside a power station, within which another group of deranged people worship electricity as if it still exists.

Unknown to everyone on Earth, the electricity-interfering satellite is destroyed by meteor impact. It's Tempest who discovers the station's generators work when he turns them on to prove electricity is never coming back. The strip ends with Tempest vowing to re-create the world without the many social problems wrought by modern technology.

== Reception ==
Reviewing the 2014 collected edition, Lew Stringer highly praised both the art and story, describing it as "one of the best British adventure strips of its time", despite noting a hurried conclusion.
