= Robin Smith (comics) =

British artist

- Born: 1957 (age 68–69)
- Areas: Penciller, Inker
- Notable works: The Bogie Man

Robin Smith is a British artist best known for his long association with the science fiction magazine 2000 AD, including work on Judge Dredd and the Bad City Blue mini-series. For a period, he also served as 2000 AD art editor.

From 1989 onwards, he drew The Bogie Man for Fat Man Press.

== Bibliography ==
Comics work includes:

- Bad City Blue - with Alan Grant (credited as "Craig Lipp"), in 2000 AD #468-477
- Judge Dredd - Troublemaker - Alan Grant with Gordon Rennie, in 2000 AD #2312, 2022 (a tribute to the late Alan Grant)
- Tharg the Mighty - The Final Secret (2000 AD Sci-Fi Special, 1980)
- Tharg's Future Shocks:
  - "The Big Day" - with Alan Moore, in 2000 AD #270, 1982
  - "Doin' Time" - with Peter Milligan, in 2000 AD #441, 1985
  - "Scablands" - with Arthur Wyatt, in 2000 AD #1607, 2008
  - "Legacy System" - with Arthur Wyatt, in 2000 AD #1640, 2009
- The Bogie Man (with John Wagner and Alan Grant):
  - The Bogie Man - John Brown Publishing, 128 pages, 1991, ISBN 1-870870-21-2
  - Chinatoon - Toxic! #2-9, 1991, started by Cam Kennedy, redrawn and completed by Smith, Atomeka Press, 112 pages, 1993, ISBN 1-85809-006-7
  - The Manhattan Project - Toxic! #11-21, 1991, Tundra Publishing, 52 pages, 1992, ISBN 1-85809-001-6
  - The Bogie Man - collects the first volume and Chinatoon, Pocket Books, 224 pages, 1998, ISBN 0-671-00923-0
  - "Return to Casablanca" - Judge Dredd Megazine #227-233, 2005
- L.E.G.I.O.N. #37, 39-43, 46-47, 49-50, 56-58 (inks, with writer Barry Kitson/Alan Grant and pencils by Barry Kitson, DC Comics, 1992–1993
- Green Candles - with Tom De Haven, 3-issue mini-series, Paradox Press, 1995
