= Carlos Cruz González =

Spanish comics artist (1930–2018)

Carlos Cruz
- Born: June 1, 1930 Motril, Granada, Spain
- Died: March 27, 2018 (aged 87)
- Areas: Penciller, Inker
- Notable works: The Phantom; Dan Dare; Bloodfang

Carlos Cruz González, usually known simply as Carlos Cruz (1 June 1930 – 27 March 2018, was a Spanish comics artist.

In the 1950s, he worked in Buenos Aires as a cover illustrator and cartoonist, before moving to Málaga in the 1960s, where he began working for British firm Fleetway Publications on their British comics. His work appeared in Eagle, Lion, Tiger, Buster, Smash! and others. His most significant work in British comics was his three-year stint on the series Dan Dare in the relaunched Eagle from 1985 to 1988. Between 1988 and 2003, he worked on The Phantom in Sweden.

== Bibliography ==
- 1947–1948: Chatin supplement of The Late Movement Press, Málaga
- 1956: Lightning Red and Misterix, in the Just Cartoon Colt, Buenos Aires
- 1960–1962: Sergeant Kirk
- 1962–1963: Santos Palma, in SuperMisterix, EY, Buenos Aires
- 1964: The Shrinker's Revenge, in Buster (from III-64), Fleetway
- 1964: Mighty McGinty, in Buster (from VI-64), Fleetway — reprinted in Smash! in 1970–1971 as The Fighting Three
- 1965: Battling Boffins, in Tiger (from IV-65), Fleetway
- 1965: Sergeant Rock — Paratrooper, in Tiger and Hurricane (from VI-65), Fleetway — reprinted in Smash! in 1970–1971 as The Fighting Three
- 1966: When the Sky Turned Green and various series, in The Champion, Fleetway
- 1966: Robot Builders, in Tiger, Fleetway
- 1968: Marvel's Mighty Multi-Gun, in B, (from X-68), Fleetway
- 1969: Crabbe's Crusaders, in Buster, Fleetway
- 1969: Roamin' James – Space Pilot, in Buster and Giggle (from IV-69), Fleetway
- 1970: The Pillater Peril and various other series, in Smash!, IPC
- 1971: Sniper war comic, DC Thomson
- 1971: Dr Mesmer's Revenge, in Lion, Fleetway
- 1971–1972: Juanjo, in Trinca, Doncel
- 1973: The Executioner and Murderer, Memories, Bruguera, in SuperMortadelo
- 1974: Union Jack Jackson, in Warlord (from IX-74), DC Thomson
- 1974: Pauline, in Melanie (from IV-74), Fleetway/IPC
- 1975: Wendy, various stories, Fleetway/IPC
- 1982: M.A.S.K., Fleetway/IPC
- 1983: School of Dark Secrets and various series, in Princess, Fleetway/IPC
- 1984: Bloodfang and various series, in Eagle, Fleetway/IPC
- 1985–1988: "Dan Dare: Pilot of the Future, in Eagle and Tiger, Fleetway/IPC (in colour)
- 1988–2003: The Phantom (beginning in #15 (IV-1988), Egmont/Bulls, Stockholm
