= A History of Violence (comics) =

1997 graphic novel

- First edition cover
- Date: 1997
- Main characters: Tom McKenna
- Page count: 286 pages
- Publisher: DC Comics

Creative team
- Writer: John Wagner
- Artist: Vince Locke
- Letterer: Bob Lappan
- Editor: Andy Helfer
- ISBN: 1-56389-367-3

A History of Violence is a comic book written by John Wagner and illustrated by Vince Locke, originally published in 1997 by Paradox Press and later by Vertigo Comics, both imprints of DC Comics. In 2005, it was adapted into a film of the same name, directed by David Cronenberg. This was the first cinematic adaptation of a work by John Wagner since 1995's Judge Dredd.

== Plot ==
In a rural Michigan town, cafe owner Tom McKenna becomes a local hero after he overpowers and kills two armed robbers. Despite his efforts to avoid the limelight, Tom's story receives national attention.

Tom is soon visited by three men who are later revealed to be associates of a powerful New York City Mafia family. Their leader, John Torrino, an aging hitman blind in one eye, alleges that Tom is actually a mobster named Joey who crossed him 20 years earlier. Torrino notices that Tom is missing a finger on his left hand and pulls out a pendant containing a severed finger, claiming he took it from Joey during their last encounter. Tom's wife Edie intervenes and orders the men to leave before she calls the police. The men comply but Edie still calls Sheriff Frank Carney, who confronts and chases off the gangsters but then later questions Tom as to whether they might have something against him.

Tom vehemently protests his innocence to everyone but is eventually forced to drop his façade when Torrino and his accomplices take the McKennas' son Buzz hostage in order to draw out Tom. Tom manages to thwart their plan and kill the other two mobsters, while Edie shoots Torrino dead in defense of her husband.

At the hospital, Tom finally admits to Edie and Buzz that he is in fact Joey and reveals why he left New York and changed his identity. He and his childhood friend Richie Benedetto pulled off a well-planned and spectacular heist, killing local crime boss Lou Manzi and several of his associates. This event was perpetrated mostly by Richie in retaliation for the murder of his older brother Steve. Tom, then known by his real name Joey Muni, only agreed to help so he could acquire the money that his grandmother needed for an expensive medical procedure on her heart. Richie foolishly chose to flaunt his take, which allowed Torrino and his cronies to identify him as one of the robbers. Using a young girl as bait, they lured Richie to a derelict apartment building where he was tortured and presumably killed, but not before naming Joey as his accomplice. Joey narrowly escaped the same fate, losing his finger to and taking an eye from Torrino in the process, and fled the city with the intent of starting over with a new identity, eventually changing his name to Tom McKenna.

Tom is eventually forced to confess all of this to the police after DNA analysis reveals that the finger Torrino kept is in fact his. Fortunately for him, his lawyer arrives and learns that the police failed to Mirandize him, which makes his confession inadmissible in court.

Prior to his confession to the police, Tom learns that Richie is still alive and being held captive by someone later revealed to be Manzi's sadistic son, "Little" Lou, who seeks to avenge his father's murder. Tom and Edie send their children to stay with relatives while the two of them fly to New York to deal with related legal matters. He arranges a meeting with Little Lou at a warehouse where he dispatches three more men waiting to ambush him and maims a fourth, who leaves a blood trail that helps the police track down his location later on.

Tom finds Richie hanging in a harness, having been horribly mutilated and tortured for twenty years. He is utterly deformed; his face is completely disfigured, missing an eye, both legs, both arms, and can barely speak to Tom. Little Lou arrives and knocks him down with a bat before tying him up to be tortured to death. He proceeds by drilling a hole into Tom's leg. After Lou threatens to torture and kill his family, Tom manages to grab Little Lou with his legs and topple them both over, freeing him. He gets ahold of the mobster's gun but finds that Lou had purposefully left it unloaded. The mob boss grabs an industrial chainsaw and is subsequently killed when Tom pushes him onto the running blade, slicing through his head. Tom tells Richie he will get him to a hospital, but Richie, overcome with guilt and being broken from years of torture, begs his old friend to finish him off. Reluctantly, Tom suffocates Richie in an act of euthanasia shortly before the police arrive. As Tom is loaded onto an ambulance, he assures Edie that it is all over.

== Awards ==
A History of Violence was nominated for the 2006 Angoulême International Comics Festival Prize for Scenario.

== Film adaptation ==
In 2005 the comic was adapted into a film by David Cronenberg, starring Viggo Mortensen.

While the first half of the film is faithful to the source, the remainder of the film takes many liberties with the story. Some changes are relatively minor (in the film, the main character's name is Tom Stall, he lives in Indiana and the gangsters pursuing him are from a Philadelphia-based Irish Mob), the main character's brother, played by William Hurt, bears virtually no resemblance to the corresponding character in the graphic novel.

The film's reviews were largely favorable and it garnered recognition at the Cannes Film Festival, as well as Academy Award nominations for Hurt (Best Performance by an Actor in a Supporting Role) and writer Josh Olson (Best Writing, Screenplay Based on Material Previously Produced or Published).

In a March 2009 issue of Now, comic book experts Christopher Butcher and Peter Birkemoe praised the film while panning the original comic.
