= The Bogie Man (comics) =

Comic book series

Publication information
- Publisher: Fat Man Press
- Schedule: Monthly
- Publication date: September 1989–4 September 1990
- No. of issues: 4

Creative team
- Written by: John Wagner and Alan Grant
- Artist: Robin Smith

The Bogie Man is a comic book series created by British writers John Wagner and Alan Grant and artist Robin Smith. The main character is Francis Forbes Clunie, a Scottish mental patient who resembles Humphrey Bogart and believes he is him, or rather a composite of the hard-boiled characters Bogart played in his films. Each story revolves around Clunie's construction of a completely fictional story in which he is the hero and only he can solve the "mystery" of his own creation.

== Publication history ==
The title was initially pitched to DC Comics but after they refused it, Wagner and Grant then decided to publish it independently with Fat Man Press, a publishing company based in Glasgow set up by John McShane of the comic shop, AKA Books and Comics. A four issue black and white miniseries was published, beginning in 1989 to tie in with Glasgow being the 1990 European City of Culture, in which Clunie, newly escaped from a Glasgow mental hospital, stumbles on an attempt by small-time criminals to fence some stolen turkeys. Associating the "big birds" with The Maltese Falcon, Clunie drags a gullible waitress and the nearest convenient "fat man" into proceedings, until, pursued by the criminals and the police and quoting dialogue from a variety of Bogart films, he demolishes half of Glasgow's Central Station. A collected edition was published by John Brown Publishing in 1992.

Meanwhile, The Bogie Man next appeared in the pages of Toxic!, a new weekly comic set up in 1991 in direct competition to 2000 AD. "The Chinese Syndrome", illustrated in colour by Cam Kennedy, involved Clunie thinking he is dealing with a gang of Chinese criminals in Glasgow, but was left uncompleted after co-creator Smith objected to infringement of his copyright. Toxic!, however, did manage to publish a complete Bogie Man story, "The Manhattan Project", in which Clunie went to New York and rescued the then US Vice President Dan Quayle from an entirely imaginary assassination plot, illustrated in full colour by Robin Smith. A collected edition was published by Tundra Publishing in 1992. "The Chinese Syndrome" was later revamped, redrawn in black and white by Smith and completed as "Chinatoon", a four issue miniseries, and later a collected edition, published by Tundra's UK arm Atomeka Press in 1993. A collection of the first miniseries and "Chinatoon" was later published by Paradox Press in 1998.

After this the character entered limbo for several years before a fourth story, "Return to Casablanca", was serialised in the Judge Dredd Megazine in 2005. Illustrated once again in black and white by Smith, it involves Clunie mistaking a Scottish singer who had appeared before in "Chinatoon" for resistance leader Victor Laszlo from Casablanca, while an old foe runs a scam involving illegal immigrants making shortbread, during the Edinburgh Festival.

== Issues and collected editions ==
- The Bogie Man (Fat Man Press, issue #1-4, September 1989-September 1990)
- Apocalypse presents volume 4 (July 1991) - reprints Toxic! #2-9, 1991
- Apocalypse presents volume 6 (September 1991) - reprints Toxic! #11-21, 1991
- The Bogie Man (John Brown Publishing, 128 pages, issue #1-4, 1991, ISBN 1-870870-21-2)
- Chinatoon (Toxic! #2-9, 1991, started by Cam Kennedy, redrawn and completed by Smith, Atomeka Press, 112 pages, 1993, ISBN 1-85809-006-7)
- The Manhattan Project (Toxic! #11-21, 1991, Tundra Publishing, 52 pages, 1992, ISBN 1-85809-001-6)
- The Bogie Man (collects the first volume and Chinatoon, Pocket Books, 224 pages, 1998, ISBN 0-671-00923-0)
- Return to Casablanca (Judge Dredd Megazine #227-233, 2005)

== In other media ==
A television film version of The Bogie Man was produced by the BBC and screened on BBC2 during Christmas 1992. It starred Robbie Coltrane as Clunie, with Fiona Fullerton and Midge Ure, and was based upon the original four issue miniseries. It was not received well by critics and had poor viewing figures.

Wagner and Grant felt the film was a huge disappointment due to the makers not granting them more influence in how it was made.

It has only ever been shown once and there are no plans to release the film on DVD.
