= Al's Baby =

- Cover to The Complete Al's Baby; Art by Carlos Ezquerra

Publication information
- Publisher: originally IPC Media (Fleetway) to 1999, thereafter Rebellion Developments
- First appearance: Judge Dredd Megazine 1.04 (1991)
- Created by: John Wagner; Carlos Ezquerra

Al's Baby is a British comedy comic series, which featured in the Judge Dredd Megazine and its weekly parent publication 2000 AD in the 1990s. It tells the story of Al 'The Beast' Bestardi, a mob enforcer compelled into male pregnancy to give his terminally ill boss and father-in-law, Don Luigi Sarcoma, a grandchild.

The series was created by writer John Wagner and artist Carlos Ezquerra and was the first series to appear in the Judge Dredd Megazine that was not set in the same world as Wagner and Ezquerra's most famous creation, Judge Dredd.

== Synopsis ==
=== Al's Baby ===
The story begins in a classroom where two students, Malady and Johnny, argue over gender differences due to girls being able to carry babies and boys not being able to. Their teacher, a robot, explains that at one point men were able to carry babies, but due to robot midwives, this practice was retired. She then proceeds to tell them the story of one of the first male births "when this land was still called America" in a city called Chi-Town.

An alternate version of this opening, seen in "The Complete Al's Baby" paperback, leaves out this part and has the story narrated by Vinnie, the owner of a bar and grill frequented by Al and his mobster buddies.

Al 'The Beast' Bestardi is the most feared and the toughest hit man in Chi-Town. The only person that he fears is his boss Don Luigi Sarcoma whose daughter, Velma, is married to Al. One day, Luigi reveals that he is disappointed with Al due to the fact that even though he has been married to Velma for two years, they have yet to produce an offspring. Luigi demands that they have one as he is getting old and wants the family business to continue. Al visits Velma at the Velvet Room where she is a singer, despite the fact that she is terrible at it. Velma refuses to have a baby as she believes it will ruin her career and suggests that Al carry it instead. Despite having a surrogate agree, Velma prefers Al to carry it just to see him suffer. Al considers killing himself, but realizes that this would make him a laughing stock and he goes through with the procedure. After telling his sidekick, Sal, he takes the role of midwife due to past experience.

Al and his gang have a brief run in with Mutt McClusky, a hit man for Don Ratso Verruca, resulting in Sal warning Al about exerting himself. Luigi is confused by Al's decision to get pregnant, but keeps him alive due to the circumstances. Sal quickly learns that Al has zero understanding of maternity and tries to get him to connect with the baby. After getting a belly scan, Al makes out that he is having a boy. Soon Ratso and Mutt learn of Al's pregnancy and mock him. After nearly getting bombed by Mutt, Al retaliates by sinking him in feces which lands him in the hospital. Al continues on through the pregnancy with Velma visibly annoyed. She goes to Don Luigi to go easy on Al, but he refuses and tasks him with capturing Ratso. Realizing that this would no doubt hurt the baby, Velma and Sal go and capture him themselves.

Luigi offers a deal with Ratso to end their mob war by paying him and gives him a day to think it over. In the meantime, Al and Velma use Ratso in place of a doll for diaper training, with Sal taking pictures, causing him to agree to a deal. During the trade off, Ratso fires at Al, Velma and Sal. Al's water suddenly breaks and he is rushed to the same hospital that Mutt just so happens to be at. Mutt barges into the operating room to kill Al, but is taken out by Sal and Velma. Al successfully gives birth much to everyone's delight. Luigi decides to go easy on Al for his hard work and threatens Ratso that if he were to back out of their deal that he would release the photos that Sal took.

=== Blood on the Bib ===
Al's son, Little Al, turns out to be a vicious little monster, just like his father, although his doting grandfather couldn't be more delighted. At over a year of age, Little Al is christened, but the occasion is disrupted by an assassination attempt on Don Sarcoma. Injured in the resultant shootout, the angry Don informs Al that this was called for by the heads of the Five Families in Miami, Denver, Phoenix, Dallas and San Francisco, who are angry that Don Sarcoma cheated them on an import deal. The Don orders Al to assassinate the head of each of the Five Families, and instructs him to take both Sal and newcomer Tony, Don Sarcoma's nephew by his brother from Jersey, with him on the assassinations. Al is less than pleased when Don Sarcoma announces that, because Tony is his nephew, his plan is to have Tony look after the gang upon Don Sarcoma's death, at least until Little Al is old enough. After all, Al had expected that spot to be his, considering he went through the trouble of birthing the Don's grandson.

Things grow more complicated when the nursery group that has been looking after Little Al throws him out for operating a protection racket, complete with beating the other kids violently for refusing to pay up. As this behavior has already resulted in Little Al being blackballed by every babysitter in Chi-Town, and his mother Velma is no more fit to look after him than she is to be a singer, Al has no choice but to take his son with him on the road.

The first stop is in Miami; whilst officially there to knock off Don Ricardo "Dicky" Gumma, Al makes plans to kill Tony too and make it look like an accident. The first attempt has Tony scuba out to Don Gumma's luxurious yacht and plant a limpet mine; when Al attempts to set it off prematurely, however, it fails to detonate. Don Dumma accidentally hooks Tony and his men start shooting. Little Al begins fiddling with the remote and manages to detonate the mine. Then, with a bit of luck, Tony makes it out of the blast virtually unscathed. Don Sarcoma is very proud of his grandson's achievement... but also outraged that Al took Little Al along on the mission to begin with.

As such, by the time they reach Dallas, Al decides it's best to cool his plans to assassinate Tony. Instead, whilst planning to snipe Don Frankie "The Wolf" Lupus, he has Tony handle the rifle, in order to try and get him set up for a murder rap. He then has Tony go to the street and distract Don Lupus, stalled at a tampered stoplight, by pretending to be a window washer so he can get a bead on him. However, Al decides to let Little Al pull the trigger, resulting in Don Lupus only being winged. Amazingly, when the car drives off, the suds from Tony's street shiner disguise cause them to swerve into an oncoming truck and crash, setting a fire to the building where Al, Sal and Little Al were aiming. Don Lupus escapes alive, but in the process of escaping, Al fatally hits him with their getaway car... although the sniper rifle burns up in the building.

Trading their hot car, the three men and the baby come to a stop in Dallas. Here, Al spikes Tony's drink with sleeping pills and then dumps a bag full of rattlesnakes into Tony's bedroom through the windows. However, because Tony is completely unconscious, his presence doesn't disturb the snakes. Al and Sal are then attacked by assassins sent by the remaining three Five Families heads; Don Maxie Grosso, Don Bruno "Itchy" Tinea, and Don Vito Chorea. Al, Sal and Little Al avoid the barrage by diving into the pool in the back, whilst Tony is miraculously unscathed by the gunfire. The assassins beat a hasty retreat, and Al's party carries on to Phoenix, to make their attack on Don Chorea.

Al's group hijacks a tank from a nearby army convoy and attacks Don Chorea's mustang breeding ranch. Don Chorea escapes on the back of a horse, but winds up backed up against a cliff, which ultimately crumbles under his feet as he tries to bribe Al into turning on Don Sarcoma, resulting in Don Chorea falling to his death.

Ironically, whilst trying to escape Al, Don Tinea winds up in Vegas, where Al's group has just arrived. Al wastes no time in tracking the Don down and strangling him as he visits a masseur. The last Don left, Don Grosso, hires his own assassin to take out Al in exchange for a million dollars.

Arriving in San Francisco, Al plans to assassinate Don Grosso at his favorite Italian Restaurant, getting Tony to dress up as a woman and go into the restaurant with a gun concealed in a baby carriage whilst Al and Sal wait outside dressed as police officers. The "official" plan is that Tony will carry out this final hit, with Al pointing out that becoming a Made Man in the Mafia requires at least one kill in order to coax Tony into agreeing. In reality, Al is hoping that Don Grosso's guards will kill Tony, especially as he's loaded Tony's gun with blanks. Amazingly, Tony manages to not only escape alive, but actually causes Don Grosso to fatally choke on a fish in the process.

Escaping in the confusion, the three assassins head back to collect Al's son from the local associate they left him with, only to find he's been kidnapped by Don Grosso's assassin, Mutt McClusky. Whilst McClusky does not find Little Al to be an easy hostage, nearly getting shot when the toddler grabs his gun, Al doesn't dare come after him until McClusky contacts him and arranges for a showdown on Alcatraz.

Using Little Al as leverage, McClusky forces Al to strip down and let himself be handcuffed to some bars. He then begins to torture Al, until Little Al manages to grab McClusky's gun and shoot the assassin in the foot. This gives Al the opportunity to grab McClusky with his legs and knock him out cold on the bars, and then escapes with some further help from Little Al. As they drive McClusky's boat back to San Francisco, they chain the assassin to a concrete weight and throw him overboard into the sea.

By the time Al's returned, Tony has already caught a flight back to Chi-town, and Al reluctantly heads home. There, Don Sarcoma and Tony call Al out on his attempts at assassinating Tony, which Al admits to. Don Sarcoma then tells Tony that he's failed his tests; he knew Al would try and kill Tony, and wanted Tony to prove he had what it took to be Don by killing Al himself. Having failed that test, Tony will never be Don Sarcoma's heir.

As the story ends, Don Sarcoma is so impressed with tales of Little Al's ruthlessness and viciousness that he muses Al and Velma should have another child.

=== Public Enemy No. 1 ===
Al's assassination attempt of five Dons, of course, has repercussions, with both the law and the mob wanting the Beast's head. In the hospital, Don Sarcoma tells Al three things. The first is that, to preserve some level of peace in the mob, he had to tell the Five Families that Al was a rogue agent. Secondly, he's arranged for Al to go into hiding in the mountains. Third, Al is going to have a second child - once more, by himself. Al protests getting pregnant again, but Don Sarcoma's arguments that the Sarcoma legacy must be secured, that Al has no hope of convincing Velma to get pregnant this time (especially as she's "obtained" a role as an actress in a movie), and that the Don will hand Al over to the Five Families if he doesn't do it, convince Al to return to Miama to be impregnated with Velma's egg again.

Narrowly escaping an assassination attempt whilst he recovers from the impregnation, Al and Sal head to their hidey-hole in Wyoming. To aid his attempts to hide, Al is forced to disguise himself as Sal's pregnant wife.

Unfortunately, they turn out to have a neighbor across the hill. An eccentric, wealthy retired rear admiral named Dagwood T. Filby IV, who becomes infatuated with "Alma" when he catches sight of her through his spyglass. He promptly drops over to announce himself by way of a secret tunnel leading from his mansion to Al and Sal's cabin - their cabin used to be used to house women the former own was conducting illicit liaisons with him. The cheerful old man merrily introduces himself, making it quite obvious how attracted he is to "Alma" by both his words and his repeat fondling of Al's rump, oblivious to how this nearly gets him killed by the outraged hitman. He invites the two of them over for drinks that evening and then departs.

Al is less than enthused, but Sal argues that it's in their best interest to keep Dagwood cheerfully happy about their presence, and so they drop by. The dinner is quite trying for Al's temper, as Dagwood insists on flirting and groping him shamelessly.

A long winter settles in, and Al finds himself forced to repeatedly visit Dagwood's mansion to keep from going stir-crazy. Despite little incidents like Dagwood trying to kill Sal so he can marry "Alma" himself, things proceed smoothly up until spring. Then, a call to Don Sarcoma is tapped, allowing the mob to send hitmen after Al - who is almost full term with his pregnancy. After a brief firefight, Al goes into labor; only timely assistance by Dagwood and his hover-buggy allows the three men to escape and head for safety.

Though the initial buggy is shot down, Dagwood's butler, Bellman, rescues them with a second, and they head for the airport. Al is less than pleased when, even as he finally confesses to Dagwood that he's a man, Dagwood is undeterred in his plans to wed and impregnate him. Boarding Dagwood's private plane, they fly for Miami - at the same time, Velma attempts to assassinate Mo Scarlatti, the last witness willing to testify against Al for his recent murder spree.

This results in a frantic chase as Al, Velma, a wounded Mo, the FBI and the mob all converge on the same hospital. Ironically, Al's car crushes Mo Scarlatti to death as they plough into the hospital, before Al is taken away to the delivery room whilst the FBI are confounded: with Scarlatti dead, they have no witnesses, so they can't pin the murder charges on Al. Despite a final attempt to kill Al by some mobsters, the quick thinking of Dagwood, Velma and Bellman saves Al's life and he delivers the second child.

Still infatuated with Al, Dagwood agrees to take all the blame for his destructive landing, and for the presence of the guns in the car he and Bellman used to deliver Al to the hospital. He and Bellman are subsequently sentenced to ten years on an upstate work farm.

After Al recovers from the birth, things are all roses for AL; not only is he off the hook for murder, but his role in killing Mo Scarlatti, who was also selling out other mob leaders, persuades the mob to call off their vendetta. At a party to celebrate, Don Sarcoma formally names Al as the new godfather of the Sarcoma mob, at least until Sarcoma's grandsons come of age. Which is when Al corrects Don Sarcoma; the second Bestardi-Sarcoma child is a girl, Louise. The revelation that he has a granddaughter enrages the Don so badly that he suffers a fatal heart attack, leaving Al, finally, as not only a mother of two, but also as the Godfather.

== Publications ==
- "Al's Baby" (in Judge Dredd Megazine, 1.04-15, 1991)
- "Blood on the Bib" (in Judge Dredd Megazine, 2.16-2.24, 1993)
- "Public Enemy No. 1" (in 2000 AD, #1034-44, 1997)

=== Collected Editions ===
- Wagner, John & Ezquerra, Carlos (2010) The Complete Al's Baby. Oxford: Rebellion (ISBN 9781906735494)
