= Outcasts (DC Comics) =

DC limited series

- Cover art for the first issue of Outcasts, published by DC Comics in 1987.

Publication information
- Publisher: DC Comics
- Schedule: Monthly
- Format: Limited series
- Publication date: October 1987 - September 1988
- No. of issues: 12
- Main character(s): Kaine Salinger; B.D. Rickenbacker; Yancy Queeg; Shock "Killer" Kowalski; Professor W. R. Watson; The Satan Brothers

Creative team
- Created by: John Wagner, Alan Grant
- Written by: John Wagner; Alan Grant
- Penciller: Cam Kennedy
- Inker: Steve Montano
- Letterer(s): Agustin Mas; John Costanza; Bill Oakley
- Colorist(s): Tom Ziuko; Nansi Hoolahan
- Editor(s): Mike Carlin; Dennis O'Neil; Renée Witterstaetter

Outcasts is a 1987 twelve-issue limited series published in 1987 by American company DC Comics. It was written by John Wagner and Alan Grant, and drawn by Cam Kennedy and Steve Montano.

== Plot ==
The series takes place in a bleak world ruled by mega-corporations and corrupt politicians that prey on the weak and poor members of society. In this world, all manners of outrageous habits exists: Slaughterbowl (a hyper violent sport comparable to football) and government controlled euthanasia centers are among them.

The series begins with the city in an uproar due to the new law passed by corrupt city ruler, Boss Angel. He has just made being a mutant in Big City illegal and has ordered the "Mutant Clearance Act" by banning mutants on Earth, capturing them and shipping them off to work on off-world work colonies. He claims the decision was decided by ORCOM, the living organic computer that makes all of Big City's decisions.

Kaine Salinger, the rich daughter of slain Public Defender Salinger and herself a mutant (in secret), recruits a resistance group of mutants and misfits to discover the truth behind the Clearance Act. Her team is composed of cyborg ex-Slaughterbowl Superstar B.D Rickenbacker, the cursed to be immortal Yancy Queeg, and the blue-skinned Dag Skinnard AKA Shock, a mutant with powers of electricity who is out to avenge the death of his girlfriend by Big City enforcers.

Kaine's mutant power is eventually revealed: anything she touches ages and dies. She is shown to touch a flower and it wilts and dies instantly. In order to live, Kaine must occasionally suck the life force out of living beings. Her victims do so willingly, in exchange for money. Since they are poor and the Big City streets are tough, they sell their life force to her. Kaine's dedicated robo-servant, Joseph, recruits her victims for her and maintains the Outcast headquarters.

On various raids and excursions, the team discovers and obtains proof of the horrible truth; all male mutants taken off-world are killed and their remains destroyed. The women are kept alive for breeding purposes because mutant children produce a certain enzyme in their heads that has healing properties and can prolong life, keeping them young and vital. Big City's rich and corrupt desperately want to be inoculated with this serum, named Immortalis, so they joined Boss Angel and outlawed mutantism.

Boss Angel learns the identity of B.D. Rickenbacker during one of their raids and hires the psychotic mutants The Satan Brothers to find him. They start at B.D.'s last known address and torture his father for information, ultimately killing him.

The Outcasts watch the news and it is reported that they have been killing off all of Big City's corrupt City Council Officials one by one. It is reported that at each murder scene, the killer writes the word "OUTCASTS" using the victim's blood. The actual Outcasts have not taken part in any of these murders and wonder who could have done it in their name. During the same broadcast, B.D. learns about his father's death and abandons the team abruptly to investigate, followed by Yancy and Shock.

Kaine decides to storm the popular weekly live television broadcast "Fozzy's Fabulous Freakshow" and reveal the truth to the world on live TV. She does this alone, since the rest of the team left after B.D.

B.D., Yancy, and Shock battle the Satan Brothers and defeat them, although Shock is critically injured. They take him back to Outcast Headquarters and Joseph tells them that Kaine left for the TV station.

Racing to aide Kaine, they learn that she has been gunned down in the air and is barely alive. They hijack the ambulance containing Kaine and Yancy, angry that she won't be able to finally end his life of immortality by aging him to death, grabs her bare skin as he yells at her to get up. Touching her allows her body to inadvertently absorb his life force and brings her back to life while Yancy ages, withers, and collapses to the floor in a heap of skin and bones.

B.D. gets them back to Outcast headquarters, makes sure that Kaine is treated for her wounds, and realizes that Yancy is not dead. Yancy's eyes open and B.D. can communicate with him via Yancy's blinking eyes (one blink for yes, two blinks for no). B.D. grabs a red bucket and puts Yancy's bones and head in it and carries it with him, talking to his old pal as if nothing happened to him.

With Kaine and Shock incapacitated and Yancy out of the game, B.D. takes it upon himself to recruit new Outcasts. He invites his former Slaughterbowl teammate Nigel "Killer" Kowalski to join in the struggle and assist him in springing another ex-teammate Professor W. R. Watson. AKA "The Prof" from a mental institution. Together they kidnap Boss Angel from a public appearance at "Suicide Park", a fun park where people can go and end their own lives instead of choosing the boring alternative of euthanasia.

However, The Prof is killed and the entire team is captured by Big City enforcers and brought before ORCOM, the living organic computer that runs the city. ORCOM reveals that it was the one who had killed the corrupt City Council members and that it considers itself a mutant and part of their team. ORCOM promises that they will be free if they join him.

Shock refuses to accept ORCOM, realizing that it is responsible for the death of his girlfriend and attacks. ORCOM asks him to stop, but he does not and ORCOM kills him. The rest of the team attacks ORCOM and B.D. smashes open ORCOM's braincase in the melee. Kaine touches ORCOM and he withers and dies.

Kaine has absorbed ORCOM's brain powers and now has incredible powers including telepathy. She tells Boss Angel that she is now in charge of Big City and she will allow him to work for her to set things right if he plays along. He agrees begrudgingly.

Kaine asks Yancy if he truly wants to die and he blinks twice, so she finally puts Yancy to rest. She tells the last 2 surviving Outcasts, B.D., and Killer that the time for Outcasts is over. B.D. begins to protest, but she teleports him and Killer back to the streets of Big City.

They decide that they better keep Yancy's head around for a few days, just in case he returns to life. They stalk off into the night, wishing that Kaine had kept the team together, clutching the bucket and yelling their battle cry... "Outcasts! Outcasts! Rah! Rah! Rah!"

== Crossovers ==
B.D. Rickenbacker, Nigel "Killer" Kowalski, and Yancy Queeg (in a bucket) appear in the Lobo 1993 miniseries UnAmerican Gladiators, also written by John Wagner and Alan Grant and drawn by Cam Kennedy. The main antagonists from Outcasts, The Satan Brothers, also return herein.
