= The House of Daemon =

British comic book story

- Daemon, Cassandra and Elliot on the cover of the 11 September 1982 edition of Eagle, art by José Ortiz.

Publication information
- Publisher: IPC Magazines
- Schedule: Weekly
- Title(s): Eagle; 11 September 1982 to 12 February 1983
- Formats: Original material for the series has been published as a strip in the comics anthology(s) Eagle.
- Genre: Horror
- Publication date: 11 September 1982 – 13 February 1983
- Main character(s): Elliot Aldrich; Cassandra Aldrich; Daemon

Creative team
- Writer(s): John Wagner and Alan Grant
- Artist(s): José Ortiz
- Editor(s): Dave Hunt

"The House of Daemon" is a horror British comic strip, appearing in titles published by IPC Magazines. The story was published in the anthology Eagle from 11 September 1982 to 12 February 1983, written by John Wagner and Alan Grant, with art by José Ortiz. The story followed couple Elliot and Cassandra Aldrich, who moved into a new home – only to find it is haunted by a demonic being.

== Creation ==
Grant had never written a horror comic before, and was not a fan of the genre. He would reflect that "those kinds of magical concepts are often rather too easy to write. If you've got a problem you can just think of some magic to get yourself out of it."

== Publishing history ==
Wagner and Grant were occasionally asked to adjust their scripts for the serial when they were considered too scary, leading to some rewrites. The story ran between 11 September and 12 February 1983.

In 1998, the rights to the strips created for Eagle – including "House of Daemon" – were purchased from Egmont Publishing by the Dan Dare Corporation. David McDonald leased the rights to the serial for Hibernia Books in 2015; a fan of the story, he would note "It stands up really well, the art is fantastic and the storyline's great", and felt it was comparable to stories running in 2000 AD at the time. Grant was sent a copy by Hibernia, and was impressed with how well it read, particularly praising Ortiz's art in noting "I didn't fully recognise it at the time but Ortiz was supremely talented, and his art was wonderful".

== Synopsis ==
Architect Elliot Aldrich has constructed a dream house for his wife Cassandra. However, the isolated house has been possessed by an evil presence calling itself Daemon. After a short period of paranormal activity, Daemon was able to trap the couple, along with workmen, police, and paranormal investigators in nightmarish worlds of his own devising, inside each area of the house.

Daemon's abilities were limited only by his own demented imagination; the kitchen became a large jungle which took several days to cross, in a futuristic recreation of the Vietnam War. Cassandra was revealed to possess psychic powers that enabled the group to battle Daemon; for example, by navigating through the house despite its appearance. She also located three apparent wizards in a peaceful sanctuary, within the building's lounge. The wizards revealed that they and Daemon were from the 26th century, where humanity had perfected psychic powers. Daemon, an exceptionally powerful child of darkness, was imprisoned within the still-standing house, with the three wizards combining their power to act as his jailers. However, Daemon was able to reach over half a millennium into the past to torture those on the site of his future prison, with the wizards only able to follow him but not stop him.

Eventually, the couple located Daemon in the house's attic. The people supposedly killed in the house were revealed to be alive, due to Daemon's reality-manipulation abilities; he intended to torture them indefinitely. Cassandra herself temporarily defeated his physical form with poison, and the people escaped. Elliot and his building firm encircled the house with high brick walls, isolating Daemon within until his jailors would be ready in the 26th century.

== Collected editions ==
Title	ISBN	Publisher	Release date	Contents
The House of Daemon	[ISBN unspecified]	Hibernia Books	2015	Material from Eagle 11 September 1982 to 12 February 1983

== Reception ==
The House of Daemon was positively received by critics. Joel Harley of Starburst praised its characterisation and deemed it "one of the best-looking horror comics of all time".
