= John Wagner =

American-born British comics writer (born 1949)

John Wagner MBE
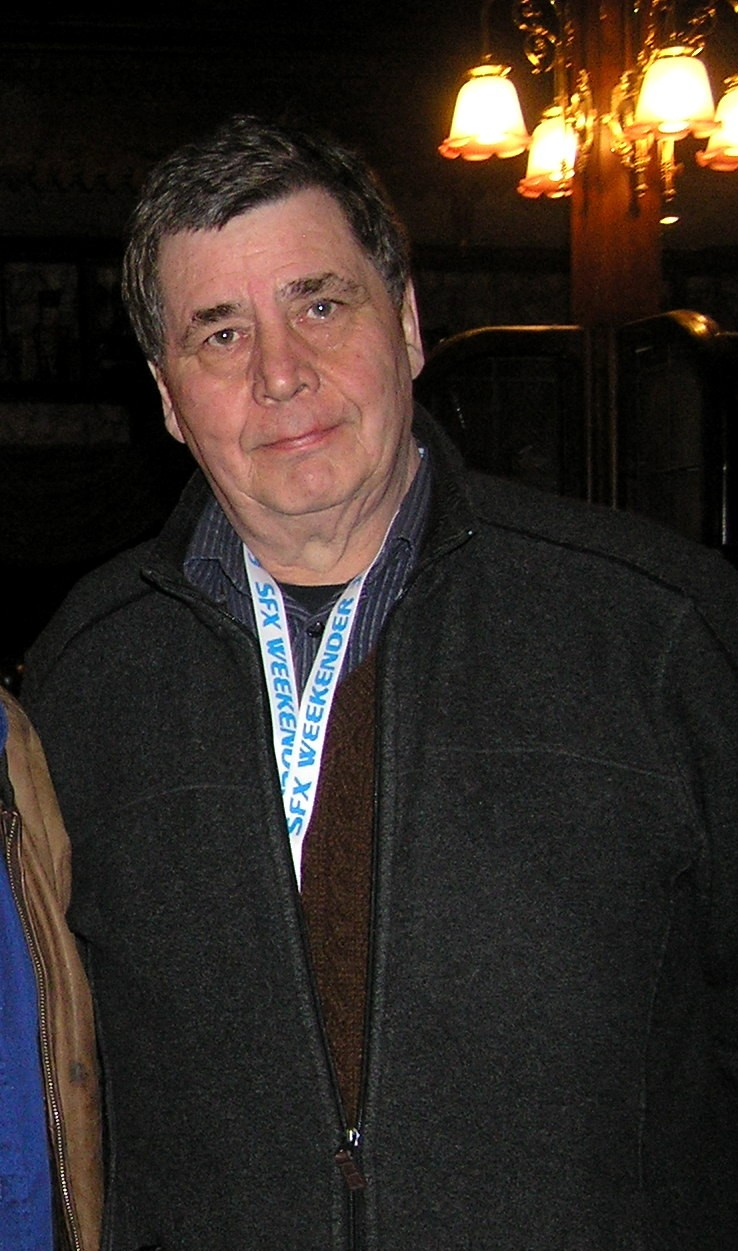
- Wagner in 2012
- Born: John Alexander Wagner; July 18, 1949 (age 77) Pennsylvania, U.S.
- Area: Writer
- Pseudonyms: John Howard; T.B. Grover; Mike Stott; Keef Ripley; Rick Clark
- Notable works: Judge Dredd; Strontium Dog; The Last American; The Bogie Man; A History of Violence; Button Man
- Collaborators: Pat Mills; Alan Grant; Carlos Ezquerra
- Awards: Eagle Award (x3); UK Comic Art Award (x4); National Comics Award (x4); Inkpot Award

John Alexander Wagner (born 1949) is an American-born British comics writer. Alongside Pat Mills, he helped revitalise British comics in the 1970s, and continues to be active in the British comics industry, occasionally also working in American comics. He is the co-creator, with artist Carlos Ezquerra, of the character Judge Dredd.

Wagner started his career in editorial with D. C. Thomson & Co. in the late 1960s before becoming a freelance writer and a staff editor at IPC in the 1970s. He has worked in children's humour and girls' adventure comics, but is most notable for his boys' adventure comics; he helped launch Battle Picture Weekly (1975), for which he wrote "Darkie's Mob", and 2000 AD (1977), for which he created numerous characters, including Judge Dredd, Strontium Dog, Robo-Hunter and Button Man. In the 1980s, he and co-writer Alan Grant wrote prolifically for IPC's 2000 AD, Battle, Eagle, Scream! and Roy of the Rovers. They also wrote for DC Comics' Batman in the U.S., created a series of Batman and Judge Dredd team-up comics, and started the British independent comic The Bogie Man. Judge Dredd has twice been adapted for film, and David Cronenberg adapted Wagner's graphic novel A History of Violence into the 2005 film of the same name. Wagner continues to write for 2000 AD and Judge Dredd Megazine.

On 12 June 2026, the British government announced that Wagner will be awarded an MBE in the King's birthday honours "for services to British Comic Books and the Comic Book Industry".

== Biography ==
=== Early life and career ===
"Patridge's Patch", from Jet, co-written with Pat Mills, illustrated by Mike Western, 1971.

Wagner was born in Pennsylvania, U.S., in 1949, the product of a war marriage. When Wagner was twelve his parents separated and his mother returned to Greenock in Scotland with the children. Wagner describes himself as "a pretty badly adjusted youth" in America, fighting and getting into trouble, and says he "benefited a lot from the added discipline of life in Scotland."

When he left school he joined a printing company, going to college on day release, until his aunt showed him an advert for editorial assistants at D. C. Thomson & Co. in Dundee. He got the job, starting in the Fiction department, and went on to become chief sub-editor of the romance comic Romeo, and also wrote horoscopes. He and Pat Mills, a fellow sub-editor, left to go freelance in 1971, and began submitting scripts to London's IPC, working from Mills' garden shed in Wormit, Fife. Starting with humour titles like Cor!! and Whizzer and Chips, they also went on to write for girls' and boys' adventure comics, including strips like "Yellowknife of the Yard", about a Native American detective in London, drawn by Doug Maxted, for Valiant; "Partridge's Patch", about a friendly rural policeman and his dog, drawn by Mike Western, for Jet; "The Can-Do Kids" for Lion, and boarding school serial "School for Snobs" for Tammy. IPC managers John Purdie and John Sanders began to take notice.

After nine months their writing partnership broke up, and Wagner moved to London to join IPC's staff, editing girls' titles Sandie and Princess Tina until 1973, when both were merged into other titles. After that he quit comics for a time, taking a variety of jobs, including as caretaker of an estate in the Scottish Highlands and dredging on a barge.

=== Battle, Valiant and Action ===
"Darkie's Mob", illustrated by Mike Western, from Battle Picture Weekly

In the autumn of 1974 Pat Mills had been tasked with developing Battle Picture Weekly, a new war-themed title for IPC to compete with D. C. Thomson's Warlord. He asked Wagner to join him and help develop characters. Mills and Wagner were dissatisfied with the sanitised nature of boys' comics and wanted to make them harder-hitting, with more working-class heroes. They devised the opening line-up themselves, with the assistance of Gerry Finley-Day, before farming the stories out to other writers. The title was launched with a cover date of 8 March 1975, and was a hit.

Wagner continued to write for girls' comics, including scripting gymnastics strip "Bella at the Bar" for Tammy, and was appointed editor of the ailing boys' weekly Valiant. Characters he created for this title included the tough New York City cop "One-Eyed Jack", drawn by John Cooper, which was inspired by the film Dirty Harry and became the comic's most popular character, and "Soldier Sharp", drawn by Joe Colquhoun, about a cunning coward in World War II. Both strips transferred to Battle when Valiant was merged into it in 1976, with One-Eyed Jack leaving the police and becoming a spy.

Wagner then quit editorial and returned to freelance writing. In 1976–77 he wrote "Darkie's Mob" for Battle, a violent series about a renegade British captain leading a group of lost soldiers in a personal war against the Japanese in Burma during World War II, drawn by Mike Western, which became one of the comic's most popular strips, although Wagner has since said he regrets "some of the jingoistic, racist language" used. A collected edition was published by Titan Books in 2011. Other strips he wrote for Battle included "Joe Two Beans" (1977), about a mute Native American soldier in the Pacific Campaign, drawn by Eric Bradbury, and the naval series "HMS Nightshade" (1978–79), drawn by Western. For Mills' short-lived, controversial title Action he scripted the boxing strip "Blackjack". During this time he shared a flat on Camberwell New Road in London with future 2000 AD editor Steve MacManus.

=== 2000 AD ===
In 1976 Mills brought Wagner in as script adviser for the new science fiction comic he was developing, 2000 AD. Wagner suggested the new title needed a cop story, and his proposal, "Judge Dredd", took the Dirty Harry archetype further, imagining a violent lawman, empowered to dispense justice on the spot in a future New York. Artist Carlos Ezquerra was asked to visualise the character, but Wagner initially hated the elaborate look Ezquerra came up with, thinking it "way over the top". When a proposed buy-out of 2000 AD that would have improved creators' terms and conditions fell through, Wagner walked away from the comic, leaving Mills to develop the character by commissioning stories from freelancers. The first published episode appeared in issue 2, based on a script by Peter Harris, rewritten by Mills and drawn by Mike McMahon, which alienated Ezquerra. Wagner returned to write the character from issue 9, and has written the majority of Judge Dredd stories since. Ezquerra returned in 1982 to draw the "Apocalypse War" storyline, and continued to draw the character semi-regularly until his death in 2018.

Wagner created two long-running series in 1978. One, "Robo-Hunter", a private detective-style character who specialised in robot-related cases, was initially drawn by José Ferrer, but his pages were partly redrawn by Ian Gibson, who became the strip's regular artist. The other, "Strontium Dog", a sci-fi western about a bounty hunter in a future where mutants are an oppressed minority forced into doing such dirty work, was created by Wagner and Ezquerra for Starlord, a short-lived sister title to 2000 AD with higher production values. Starlord was later merged into 2000 AD, bringing "Strontium Dog" with it.

=== Doctor Who ===
During their writing partnership, Wagner and Mills had submitted story ideas to the BBC for the TV series Doctor Who in the 1970s, but Wagner eventually dropped out, tired of the endless rewrites requested, an experience which turned him off TV writing. Mills' involvement came to an end when the show's script editor changed. Artist Dave Gibbons was aware of this, and when he was offered the chance to draw the lead strip in Doctor Who Weekly in 1979, he suggested them as writers. The pair wrote four eight-part serials, based on their unmade TV scripts. They adapted them separately, Wagner scripting "City of the Damned" and "Dogs of Doom", and Mills scripting "The Iron Legion" and "The Star Beast", although all were credited to "Mills & Wagner".

=== Partnership with Alan Grant ===
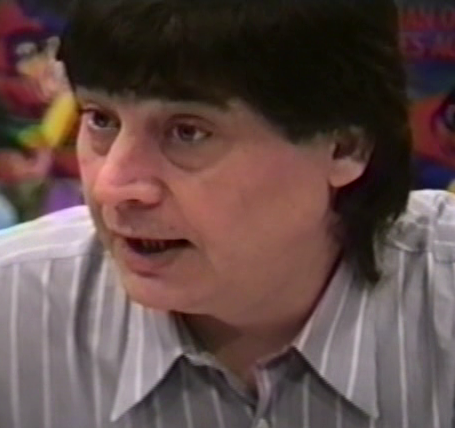
John Wagner at a comic convention in New York City in 1992.

From 1980 to 1988 he wrote in partnership with Alan Grant, an old friend and former D. C. Thomson and 2000 AD sub-editor with whom he was sharing an old farmhouse in Essex, although most stories were credited to Wagner alone (under one of his pseudonyms) or Grant alone – whichever of them typed the script up got the cheque. Wagner (as John Howard or T. B. Grover) was credited with "Judge Dredd", and Grant with the less frequent "Robo-Hunter", "Strontium Dog", and the Judge Dredd spin-off "Anderson, Psi Division", while some strips, like the CB-inspired space haulage comedy "Ace Trucking Co.", were credited to "Grant/Grover". "Judge Dredd" was credited to "Wagner/Grant" starting in 1986.

Other pseudonyms were created, at the insistence of publisher John Sanders, to disguise how prolific the two writers were. For the revived Eagle they wrote "Doomlord", "Joe Soap", "Computer Warrior", "The Fists of Danny Pyke", "Manix" and "The House of Daemon"; for Scream! they wrote "The Thirteenth Floor", for Roy of the Rovers they wrote "Dan Harker's War", and for Battle they wrote "Invasion 1984". During this time Wagner wrote the documentary strip "Fight for the Falklands" for Battle, without Grant who had no interest in war stories, and "Dan Dare" with Pat Mills for Eagle.

Wagner and Grant became part of the so-called "British Invasion" of American comics during the 1980s. In 1987 their first title, a mini-series called Outcasts, was published by DC Comics with Cam Kennedy as artist. Outcasts was well received, though it never sold in great quantities, and this success led to the pair writing Batman in the pages of Detective Comics from issue 583, largely with Norm Breyfogle on art duties. Grant and Wagner introduced the Ventriloquist in their first Batman story and the Ratcatcher in their third. The pair also created the bleak nuclear dystopia The Last American for Epic Comics with longtime Dredd artist Mike McMahon. Arguments over the direction of that title and the ending of the Judge Dredd story "Oz" led to the end of their writing partnership and they split their work between them: Wagner kept "Judge Dredd", while Grant continued "Strontium Dog" and "Anderson, Psi Division" and became the sole writer of Detective Comics. Although the two continued to collaborate from time to time, they never resumed a full-time partnership.

=== Creators' rights ===
In 1987, IPC's comics division was sold to Robert Maxwell as Fleetway Publications. John Davidge was appointed as publishing director in 1989, and within a matter of weeks was confronted by Wagner, who emptied a large bag of Judge Dredd merchandise onto his desk, pointed out he had received no royalties for any of it, and threatened a creator walk-out over the issue. Davidge, whose background was in magazine and book publishing, was shocked, and introduced written contracts and royalty payments for comic creators.

=== The Bogie Man and the 1990s ===
One series Wagner and Grant did continue writing together was The Bogie Man, about an escaped mental patient who thinks he is Humphrey Bogart, or rather a composite of the characters he played, and constructs imaginary cases by associating random events with events in Bogart films. They had previously pitched the series, unsuccessfully, to DC before writing Outcasts. It was first published as a four-part miniseries by the Scottish independent Fat Man Press in 1989, intending to tie in with Glasgow's position as European City of Culture in 1990, and further stories followed from other publishers.

Wagner and Grant were named as consulting editors on a new title, the Judge Dredd Megazine, in 1990. Wagner did most of the development work, and wrote three of the five strips in the opening line-up, including "America", illustrated by Colin MacNeil, which examined the totalitarian nature of the Judge system through the story of a young woman who becomes a pro-democracy terrorist, and "Young Death: Boyhood of a Superfiend", with art by Peter Doherty, which told the origin of Dredd's arch-enemy Judge Death in humorous style. While his efforts were concentrated on Dredd in the Megazine, Wagner took a break from writing the character in 2000 AD, replaced by Garth Ennis, Grant Morrison, Mark Millar and others. He did not resume writing for 2000 AD for more than three years.

Wagner was initially involved in Toxic!, an independent weekly anthology launched in 1991, but, aside from two Bogie Man serials co-written with Grant, most of his proposed stories were rejected and he withdrew from the project. One such proposal, "Al's Baby", a comedy about a male mob hitman who becomes pregnant, drawn by Carlos Ezquerra, ran in the Judge Dredd Megazine in 1991. Another, "Button Man", a contemporary urban gladiator thriller drawn by Arthur Ranson, was published in 2000 AD in 1992. Both spawned sequels.

Wagner and Grant reunited in 1992 for Judgement on Gotham, a hit graphic novel teaming up Judge Dredd and Batman, co-published by Fleetway and DC and featuring painted art by Simon Bisley. Further team-ups between Dredd and Batman followed, but were beset by production delays.

In the mid-1990s Wagner worked on a number of licensed properties for Dark Horse Comics in the US, including Aliens, Star Wars – notably solo stories starring Boba Fett and the comics strand of the multimedia project Shadows of the Empire – and Xena: Warrior Princess. In 1997 he wrote his first original graphic novel, A History of Violence, a contemporary thriller about an unassuming small-town man whose background in gang crime comes back to haunt him, drawn by Vince Locke for the Paradox Press imprint of DC Comics. It was nominated for the Angoulême International Comics Festival Prize for Scenario in 2006.

=== 21st century ===
In 2000 Wagner and Carlos Ezquerra revived "Strontium Dog" (main character Johnny Alpha had been killed off in 1990 in a story written by Alan Grant), based on a treatment Wagner had written for an abortive TV pilot. Initially, stories were set before the character's death in a revised continuity, but 2010's "The Life and Death of Johnny Alpha" brought Johnny back from the dead.

Wagner continued to be the main writer of "Judge Dredd" in 2000 AD and the Judge Dredd Megazine. In 2003 he co-wrote the Judge Dredd/Aliens crossover, "Incubus", with Andy Diggle, which was co-published by Dark Horse Comics and 2000 AD. Since 2005 he has shared the character with other writers, including Gordon Rennie, Robbie Morrison, Si Spurrier, Al Ewing and Michael Carroll. Major storylines he has contributed include "Origins" (2006–2007), exploring how the Judge system was established, and "Day of Chaos" (2011–2012), in which many of the institutions of Dredd's world are destroyed, leaving a more dangerous city. Since 2012, he has no longer been the main writer of "Judge Dredd", but has still contributed stories occasionally.

In 2016 Wagner teamed up with Grant to create a new comic for BHP Comics. Drawn by Dan Cornwell, Rok of the Reds tells the story of a dangerous intergalactic outlaw, Rok of Arkady, who, while on the run, hides on the planet Earth by taking over the body and life of troubled football star Kyle Dixon. There were two sequels, in 2020 and 2026.

In an interview in 2026, Wagner said that his third Rok story, and a Judge Dredd story published at the same time, would most likely be the last stories he would write. (Note: These are "Rok the World" (Judge Dredd Megazine #488–ongoing) and "Death of a Judge" (2000 AD #2464–2469).) He is currently (as of January 2026) working on his autobiography. In June 2026 he received an MBE in recognition of his contribution to British comics.

A father of two, Wagner lives with his wife near Shrewsbury, Shropshire.

== Style and influence ==
Pat Mills describes Wagner's writing as "romantic but not emotional". His depictions of violent action, from "Darkie's Mob" to "Judge Dredd" to A History of Violence, are unsentimental and laced with mordant humour. Other strips, like "Robo-Hunter", "Ace Trucking Co." and "The Balls Brothers", reveal a more overt comedy side to his writing. He is well known for writing terse scripts, described by artist Dave Gibbons as being like "exciting telegrams". He says he does not think visually, but rather "in terms of plot developments [and] dialogue", preferring to leave the visual decisions to the artist.

Described by Warren Ellis as "probably the single most influential writer in British comics", Wagner is named as an influence by writers such as Alan Grant, who says he "taught me almost all I know about comic writing", Garth Ennis, Andy Diggle and Rob Williams. Alan Moore was inspired by the work of Wagner and Pat Mills in 2000 AD to try and express his ideas in mainstream comics. Wagner's own influences include the comics of D. C. Thomson & Co. of the '60s and '70s. Outside of comics, authors he admires include John Steinbeck, Patrick O'Brian and Michael Connelly.

== Awards and honours ==
=== Honours ===
- 2026: Member of the Order of the British Empire

=== Awards won ===
- 1979 Eagle Award for Favourite Comicbook Writer — U.K. (as T.B. Grover)
- 1980 Eagle Award for Favourite Comicbook Writer — U.K. (as John Howard)
- 1981 Eagle Award for Favourite Comicbook Writer — U.K. (as T.B. Grover)
- 1992 UK Comic Art Award for Best Writer
- 1992 UK Comic Art Award for Best Original Graphic Novel (Judgment on Gotham)
- 1992 UK Comic Art Award for Best Graphic Novel Collection (Judge Dredd in America)
- 1992 Career Achievement Award (UK Comic Art Awards)
- 1994 UK Comic Art Award for Best Original Graphic Novel (Vendetta in Gotham)
- 1999 National Comics Award for Best Writer
- 2001 National Comics Award for Best Writer in Comics Today (for Button Man and Judge Dredd; both in 2000 AD)
- 2002 National Comics Award for Lifetime Achievement
- 2003 National Comics Award Roll of Honour

=== Nominations ===
- 1978 Eagle Award for Favourite British writer
- 1984 Eagle Award for Favourite Comicbook Writer — U.K.
- 1985 Eagle Award for Favourite Comicbook Writer — U.K.
- 2002 National Comics Award for Best Writer in Comics Today
- 2002 National Comics Award for Best Writer Ever
- 2002 National Comics Award Roll of Honour
- 2010 Eagle Award for Favourite Writer
- 2011 Eagle Award for Favourite Writer

== Bibliography ==
See also Category:Comics by John Wagner

== Screen adaptations ==
A TV film of The Bogie Man was made in 1992 by BBC Scotland starring Robbie Coltrane, but was not well received and a series was never made. Wagner and Grant made very little money out of it. Wagner felt that the screenwriter did a poor job adapting it, and Coltrane did not understand the character.

1995 saw the release of Judge Dredd, a big budget version of the comic directed by Danny Cannon and starring Sylvester Stallone. Wagner was unhappy with the result, feeling they had filmed "the wrong script" and that "Stallone was badly advised". A second attempt at adapting the character to the screen, entitled Dredd, was released in September 2012, directed by Pete Travis from a script by Alex Garland, and starring Karl Urban. This time Wagner was consulted over the script, was involved in the promotion of the film, and has described it as "unlike the first film, a true representation of Judge Dredd".

In 2005 his graphic novel A History of Violence was adapted into a film, directed by David Cronenberg and starring Viggo Mortensen and Ed Harris. Wagner had backed the film once he saw the group of actors Cronenberg had gathered. The film was nominated for the Palme D'Or at the Cannes Film Festival in May 2005, and the script, by Josh Olson, was nominated for an Academy Award for Best Adapted Screenplay in 2005.

It was reported in May 2012 that Danish director Nicolas Winding Refn was in talks with DreamWorks about a possible Button Man film.
