= Alan Grant bibliography =

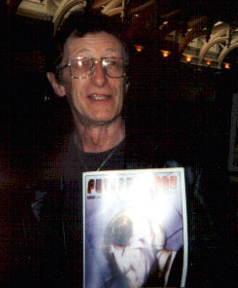
- Alan Grant with small-press title FutureQuake.
- Active period: 1979–2022

Publishers
- 2000 AD: 1979–2008
- DC Comics: 1987–2003

This is a list of works by Scottish author Alan Grant.

== Novels ==
Novels include:

- Batman: The Stone King (2001)
- Batman: No Man's Land (2001)
- DC Universe: Last Sons (2006 – featuring Superman, Martian Manhunter and Lobo)

== Comics ==
=== 2000 AD ===
Writing in 2000 AD include:

- Tharg's Future Shocks:
  - "A Close Encounter of the Fatal Kind!" (with Carlos Ezquerra, in 2000 AD #102, 1979)
  - "Nigel Goes a Hunting" (with Jesus Redondo, in 2000 AD #259, 1982)
  - "Alec Trench, Zombie" (with Ron Smith, in 2000 AD #263–264, 1982)
  - "Sid" (with Brett Ewins, in 2000 AD #286, 1982)
  - "The War Game" (with Jim Eldridge, in 2000 AD #287, 1982)
  - "A Close Encounter of the Fatal Kind" (with Carlos Ezquerra, in 2000 AD Annual 1991, 1990)
- Blackhawk (in 2000 AD #127-28 & 130–161, 1979–80 & 2000 AD 1982 Sci-Fi Special, 1982)
- Judge Dredd:
  - "The Billion Credit Caper" (with art by Bret Ewins, 2000 AD Sci-Fi Special 1979)
  - "The Judge Child" (with co-author John Wagner and art by Brian Bolland (1, 7, 17–18), Ron Smith (2–4, 9–10, 12–14, 19–20, 24–26) and Mike McMahon (5–6, 8, 11, 15–16, 21–23), in 2000 AD #156–181, 1980)
  - " The Greatest Story Ever Told" (with art by Steve Dillon, 2000 AD Sci-Fi Special 1980)
  - "The Case of the Urban Gorillas" (with art by Brett Ewins, 2000 AD Annual 1981, 1980)
  - "Block War" (with co-author John Wagner and art by Brian Bolland, in 2000 AD #182, 1980)
  - Judge Dredd (in 2000 AD #183–267, 269–499, 1980–1985)
  - "The Sweet Taste of Justice" (with art by Colin Wilson, in 2000 AD Sci-Fi Special 1981)
  - "Judge Death Lives" (with co-author John Wagner and art by Brian Bolland, in 2000 AD #224–228, 1981)
  - "The Apocalypse War" (with co-author John Wagner and art by Carlos Ezquerra, in 2000 AD #245–270, 1982)
  - "Law of the Jungle" (with art by Ian Gibson, in 2000 AD Annual 1983, 1982)
  - "The Graveyard Shift" (with co-author John Wagner and art by Ron Smith, in 2000 AD #335–341, 1983)
  - "Block Out at the Crater Bowl" (with co-author John Wagner and art by John Byrne, in 2000 AD Sci-Fi Special 1983)
  - "The Beast in 24B" (with art by Robin Smith, in 2000 AD Annual 1984, 1983)
  - "City of the Damned" (with co-author John Wagner and art by Steve Dillon (1, 5–7, 12–13), Ron Smith (2–3, 10, 14), Kim Raymond (4, 11) and Ian Gibson (8–9), in 2000 AD #393–406, 1984)
  - "Gate Crashers" (with co-author John Wagner and art by Ian Gibson, in 2000 AD Annual 1985, 1984)
  - "The Big Bang Theory" (with art by Carlos Ezquerra, in Judge Dredd Annual 1985, 1984)
  - "On the Waterfront" (with co-author John Wagner and art by Ian Gibson, in 2000 AD Annual 1986, 1985)
  - Judge Dredd Annual 1986 (1985)
  - Judge Dredd (in 2000 AD # 451–502, 1986
  - "Ladies Night" (with co-author John Wagner and art by Bryan Talbot, in 2000 AD Annual 1987, 1986)
  - Judge Dredd Annual 1987 (1986)
  - "Tomb of the Judges" (with co-author John Wagner and art by Ian Gibson, in 2000 AD #496–498, 1986)
  - Judge Dredd (in 2000 AD # 503–554, 1987)
  - "The Four Horsemen" (with co-author John Wagner and art by Mike Collins and Mark Farmer, in 2000 AD Sci-Fi Special 1987)
  - "She-Devils!" (with co-author John Wagner, in 2000 AD Annual 1988, 1987)
  - Judge Dredd (in 2000 AD # 555–574 & 577, 1988)
  - "The Gaia Conspiracy" (with art by Phil Elliott, 2000 AD Sci-Fi Special 1988)
  - "Joe Dredd's Blues" (with co-author John Wagner and art by John Higgins, 2000 AD Annual 1989, 1988)
  - Judge Dredd Annual 1989 (1988)
  - Judge Dredd Mega-Special #1 (1988)
  - Judge Dredd (in 2000 AD # 587, 598, 600–602 & 607, 1988)
  - "Confessions of an Anarchist Flea" (with art by Vanyo, in 2000 AD Winter Special 1988)
  - "A Total Near Death Experience" (by Alan Grant, with art by Barry Kitson, in 2000 AD #629–630, 1989)
  - Judge Dredd Mega-Special #2 (1989)
  - "Headbangers" (with art by Kevin Hopgood, in 2000 AD Annual 1990, 1989)
  - Judge Dredd Annual 1990 (1989)
  - "The Santa Affair" (with art by Arthur Ranson, in 2000 AD Winter Special 1989)
  - Judge Dredd Mega-Special #3 (1990)
  - Judge Dredd (in Judge Dredd Megazine vol.1 #1–6, 10–20, 1990–92)
  - Judge Dredd Mega-Special #4 (1991)
  - "The Art of Geomancy" (in 2000 AD with John M. Burns #762-765, 1991-1992)
  - "Parallel Lines" (in 2000 AD Yearbook 1993, 1992)
  - Judge Dredd (in Judge Dredd Megazine vol.2 #19–20, 1993)
  - Judge Dredd Mega-Special #8 (1995)
  - Judge Dredd (in 2000 AD #1170-1172, 1174-1177, 1999)
  - "Pumpkin Eater" (with Siku, in 2000 AD #1180-1182, 2000)
  - Judge Dredd (in 2000 AD #1274, 1277-1278, 1280, 1288, 2002)
  - Judge Dredd (in 2000 AD #1375-1377, 1388, 1391, 1406-1407 2004)
  - "Magic Moments" (with David Roach, in 20000 AD #1567, 2008)
  - "Gorilla/z" (with Mike Collins, in 20000 AD #1568, 2008)
  - "The Lost Cases" (in Judge Dredd Megazine #292-297, 2010)
  - Judge Dredd (in Judge Dredd Megazine #314-315, 2011)
  - Judge Dredd Text Story (in Judge Dredd Megazine #326-327, 2012)
  - "Ratfink's Revenge" (with Tiernen Trevallion, in Judge Dredd Megazine #328-330, 2012)
  - Judge Dredd (in Judge Dredd Megazine #332-333, 2013)
  - "Witch's Promise" (with David Roach, in 2000 AD #1818, 2013)
  - "Night At the Museum" (with Robin Smith, in 2000 AD Sci-Fi Special 2019)
- Tharg the Mighty (in 2000 AD #162, Sci-Fi Special & 176-77, 1980)
- Strontium Dog (all co-written with John Wagner unless otherwise stated; all art by Carlos Ezquerra unless otherwise stated):
  - "Death’s Head" (2000 AD #178–181, 1980)
  - "The Schicklgruber Grab" (2000 AD #182–188, 1980)
  - "Mutie’s Luck" (2000 AD #189, 1980)
  - "The Doc Quince Case" (2000 AD #190–193, 1980–81)
  - "The Bad Boys Bust" (2000 AD #194–197, 1981)
  - "Portrait of a Mutant" (2000 AD #200–206, 210–221, 1981)
  - "The Gronk Affair" (2000 AD #224–227, 1981)
  - "The Kid Knee Caper" (2000 AD #228–233, 1981)
  - "The Moses Incident" (2000 AD #335–345, 1983)
  - "The Killing" (2000 AD #350–359, 1984)
  - "Outlaw!" (2000 AD #363–385, 1984)
  - "The Big Bust Of ’49" (2000 AD #415–424, 1985)
  - "The Slavers Of Drule" (2000 AD #425–436, 1985)
  - "Max Bubba" (2000 AD #445–465, 1985–86)
  - "Smiley’s World" (2000 AD #466–467, 1986)
  - "Rage" (2000 AD #469–489, 1986)
  - "Incident on Mayjer Minor" (2000 AD #490–496, 1986)
  - "Warzone!" (2000 AD #497–499, 1986)
  - "Incident at the Back o' Beyond" (written by Grant alone, art by Robin Smith; 2000 AD 1983 Annual)
  - "The Beast of Milton Keynes" (written by Grant alone; 2000 AD Annual 1986)
  - "Bitch" (2000 AD #505–529, 1987)
  - "The Royal Affair" (2000 AD #532–536, 1987)
  - "A Sorry Case" (art by Colin MacNeil); (2000 AD #540–543, 1987)
  - "The Rammy" (2000 AD #544–553, 1987)
  - "The Stone Killers" (written by Grant alone; 2000 AD #560–572, 1988)
  - "Incident On Zeta" (written by Grant alone; plot suggested by Carlos Ezquerra; 2000 AD #573, 1988)
  - "The No-Go Job" (written by Grant alone; art by Simon Harrison; 2000 AD #580–587, 1988)
  - "Fever" (art by Kim Raymond; 2000 AD Annual 1987)
  - "Complaint" (2000 AD Annual 1988)
  - "Incident at the End of the World" (art by Keith Page; 2000 AD Annual 1991, 1990)
  - "Assault on Trigol 3" (written by Steve MacManus, art by Rob Moran; 2000 AD Sci-fi Special 1979)
  - "The Final Solution" (part 1 - written by Grant alone; art by Simon Harrison; 2000 AD #600–606, 615–621, 636–641, 645–647, 1988–89)
  - "The Final Solution" (part 2 - written by Grant alone; art by Colin MacNeil; 2000 AD #682–687, 1990)
  - "Incident at the Birth of the Universe" (written by Grant alone; art by Kev Walker; 2000 AD Winter Special 1988)
  - "The Town that Died of Shame" (written by Grant alone; art by Brendan McCarthy and Colin MacNeil; 2000 AD Sci-Fi Special 1988)
  - "Judge Dredd: Top Dogs" (art by Colin MacNeil; Judge Dredd Annual 1991, 1990)
- Ace Trucking Co. (with co-author John Wagner and art by Massimo Belardinelli, unless noted):
  - The Complete Ace Trucking Co. Volume 1 (320 pages ISBN 1-905437-77-3) collects:
    - "The Kleggs" (in 2000 AD #232–236, 1981)
    - "Hell's Pocket" (with art by Ian Gibson, in 2000 AD #239–243, 1981)
    - "Lugjack" (in 2000 AD #244–250, 1982)
    - "The Great Mush Rush" (in 2000 AD #251–258, 1982)
    - "The Ughbug Bloos" (in 2000 AD #259, 1982)
    - "Last Lug To Abbo Dabbo" (in 2000 AD #260–267, 1982)
    - "Joobaloo" (in 2000 AD #268–272, 1982)
    - "Too Many Bams" (in 2000 AD #273–278, 1982)
    - "The Kloistar Run" (in 2000 AD #279–285, 1982)
    - "Stoop Coop Soup" (in 2000 AD #288–293, 1982)
  - The Complete Ace Trucking Co. Volume 2 (336 pages ISBN 1-905437-98-6) collects:
    - "Bamfeezled" (2000AD Sci-Fi Special 1982)
    - "On The Dangle" (in 2000 AD #378–386, 1984)
    - "Strike!" (in 2000 AD #387–390 and 392–400, 1984–1985)
    - "The Croakside Trip" (in 2000 AD #428–433, 1985)
    - "Stowaway Lugjacker" (in 2000 AD Annual 1986, 1985)
    - "Whatever Happened to Ace Garp?" (in 2000 AD #451, 1986)
    - "The Doppelgarp" (in 2000 AD #452–472, 1986)
    - "The Garpetbaggers" (in 2000 AD #475–483 and 485–498, 1986)
    - "The Homecoming" (in 2000 AD Annual 1989, 1988)
- Robo-Hunter:
  - Robo-Hunter (in 2000 AD #259–272, 275–281 & 283–288, 292–307, 312–334 & 1984 2000 AD Annual 1982–1983)
  - Robo-Hunter (in 2000 AD prog 2004 & #1371–1373, 2003–2004)
- Samantha Slade Robo-Hunter
  - "Like A Virgin" (in 2000 AD prog 2004 & #1371-1373, 2004)
  - "The Furzt Case" (in 2000 AD #1406–1411, 2004)
  - "The Davinchy Code" (in 2000 AD #prog 2005, 2004)
  - "Stim!" (in 2000 AD #1450-1456, 2005)
  - "Casino Royal" (in 2000 AD #1527-1531, 2007)
  - "I, Jailbird!" (in 2000 AD 1545-1549, 2007)
- Harry Twenty on the High Rock (uncredited co-writer) (in 2000 AD # 287–307, 1982–1983)
- Time Twisters:
  - "Nigel Goes a Hunting" (with Eric Bradbury, in 2000 AD #294, 1982)
  - "Dr Dale's Diary" (with Boluda, in 2000 AD #302, 1983)
  - "Rogan's Run" (with Massimo Belardinelli, in 2000 AD #307, 1983)
  - "The Avenging Kong Meets Laurel and Hardy" (with Mike White, in 2000 AD #313, 1983)
  - "TCSpudd's First Case" (with Jim Eldridge, in 2000 AD #316, 1983)
  - "I Could Do That" (with Mike White, in 2000 AD #321, 1983)
  - "Que Sera, Sera" (with Robin Smith, in 2000 AD #346, 1983)
  - "Jogging" (with Geoff Senior, in 2000 AD #348, 1983)
- Anderson: Psi Division:
  - "The Haunting" (with art by Kim Raymond, 2000 AD Annual 1984, 1983)
  - "The Mind of Edward Bottlebum" (with co-author John Wagner and art by Ian Gibson, Judge Dredd Annual 1985, 1984)
  - "Four Dark Judges" (with art by Brett Ewins (1–7), Cliff Robinson (8–10, 12) and Robin Smith (11), in 2000 AD #416–427, 1985)
  - "The Possessed" (as R. Clark, with art by Brett Ewins, in 2000 AD #468–478, 1986)
  - "Hour of the Wolf" (with art by Barry Kitson and Will Simpson, in 2000 AD #520–531, 1987)
  - "A Fistful of Denimite" (with art by Ian Gibson, in Judge Dredd Annual 1986, 1985)
  - "Golem" (with art by Enric Romero, in 2000 AD Annual 1987, 1986)
  - "A Soldier's Tale" (with art by Mike Collins, in Judge Dredd Annual 1988, 1987)
  - "Colin Wilson Block" (with art by Ian Gibson, in 2000 AD Winter Special 1988)
  - "Contact" (with art by Mark Farmer, in 2000 AD #607–609, 1988–1989)
  - "Beyond the Void" (with art by Mick Austin, in 2000 AD #612–613, 1989)
  - "Helios" (with art by David Roach, in 2000 AD #614–622, 1989)
  - "Triad" (with art by Arthur Ranson, in 2000 AD #635–644, 1989)
  - "The Prophet" (with art by David Roach, in 2000 AD #645–647, 1989)
  - "The Random Man" (with art by Carlos Ezquerra, in 2000 AD #657–659, 1989)
  - "Judge Corey – Leviathan's Farewell" (with art by Mick Austin, in 2000 AD Sci-Fi Special 1989)
  - "Confessions of a She-Devil" (with artist Mick Austin, 2000 AD Annual 1990, 1989)
  - "The Screaming Skull" (with art by David Roach, in 2000 AD #669–670, 1990)
  - "Shamballa" (with art by Arthur Ranson, in 2000 AD #700–711, 1990)
  - "Engram" (with art and co-plotting by David Roach, in 2000 AD #712–717, #758–763, 1991)
  - "Blythe Spirit" (with art by David Roach, in Judge Dredd Megazine (vol. 2) #8, 1992)
  - "Reasons to Be Cheerful" (with art by Arthur Ranson (1) and Siku (2), in Judge Dredd Megazine (vol. 2) #10–11, 1992)
  - "The Witch? Report" (with art by Arthur Ranson, in Judge Dredd Megazine (vol. 2) #14, 1992)
  - "Baby Talk" (with co-author Tony Luke and art by Russel Fox, in Judge Dredd Mega Special 1992)
  - "George" (with art by Russell Fox, in Judge Dredd Yearbook 1993, 1992)
  - "Jesus Syndrome" (with art by Arthur Ranson, in Judge Dredd Megazine (vol. 2) #22–24, 1993)
  - "Childhood's end" (with art by Kev Walker, in Judge Dredd Megazine (vol. 2) #27–34, 1993)
  - "Voyage of the seeker" (with art by Mark Wilkinson, in Judge Dredd Megazine (vol. 2) #37, 1993)
  - "Postcards from the Edge" (with art by Steve Sampson (1, 10–11), Tony Luke (2, 8), Charles Gillespie (3, 9), Arthur Ranson (4), Xuasus (5–7), in Judge Dredd Megazine (vol. 2) #50–60, 1994)
  - "Postcard to Myself" (with art by Steve Sampson, in Judge Dredd Megazine (vol. 2) #73, 1995)
  - "Something Wicked" (with art by Steve Sampson (1–3) and Charles Gillespie (4–7), in Judge Dredd Megazine (vol. 2) #74–80, 1995)
  - "Satan" (with art by Arthur Ranson, in Judge Dredd Megazine (vol. 3) #1–7, 1995)
  - "The Protest" (with art by Arthur Ranson, in Judge Dredd Megazine (vol. 3) #14, 1996)
  - "Wonderwall" (with art by Steve Sampson, in 2000 AD #1045–1049, 1997)
  - "Crusade" (with art by Steve Sampson, in 2000 AD #1050–1061, 1997)
  - "Danse Macabre" (with art by Angel Unzueta, in 2000 AD #1076, 1998)
  - "Witch" (with art by Steve Sampson, in 2000 AD #1087–1089, 1998)
  - "The Great Debate" (with art by Steve Sampson, in 2000 AD #1090, 1998)
  - "Lawless" (with art by Trevor Hairsine, in 2000 AD #1102–1103, 1998)
  - "Horror Story" (with art by Steve Sampson, in 2000 AD #1132–1137, 1999)
  - "Semper Vi" (with art by Steve Sampson, in 2000 AD #1140, 1999)
  - "R*Evolution" (with art by Arthur Ranson, in 2000 AD #1263–1272, 2001)
  - "Half-Life" (with co-author Tony Luke, and art by Arthur Ranson, in Judge Dredd Megazine #214–217, 2004)
  - "WMD" (with art by Arthur Ranson, in Judge Dredd Megazine #221–226, 2004)
  - "Lock-in" (with art by Arthur Ranson, in Judge Dredd Megazine #227–230, 2005)
  - "City Of Dead" (with art by Arthur Ranson, in Judge Dredd Megazine #231–236, 2005)
  - "Lucid" (with art by Arthur Ranson, in Judge Dredd Megazine #238–241, 2005)
  - "Big Robots" (with art by Dave Taylor, in Judge Dredd Megazine #257–261, 2007)
  - "Wiierd" (with art by Boo Cook, in Judge Dredd Megazine #272–276, 2008)
  - "Biophyle" (with art by Boo Cook, in Judge Dredd Megazine #277–278, 2008)
  - "House of Vyle" (with art by Boo Cook, in Judge Dredd Megazine #300-304, 2010)
  - "The Trip" (with art by Boo Cook, in Judge Dredd Megazine #309-313, 2011)
  - "Teenage Kyx" (with art by Carlos Ezquera, in 2000 AD #1734-1739, 2011)
  - "Algol" (with art by Steve Yeowell, in 2000 AD #1780-1785, 2012)
  - "Stone Voices" (with art by Boo Cook, in Judge Dredd Megazine #327-331, 2012-2013)
  - "One in Ten" (with art by Carlos Ezquera, in 2000 AD #1833-1839, 2013)
  - "Dead End" (with art by Michael Dowling, in Judge Dredd Megazine #343-349, 2014)
  - "Horror Comes To Velma Dinkley" (with art by Darren Douglas, in 2000 AD Winter Special 2014)
  - "A Dream of Death" (with art by David Roach, in 2000 AD #2000, 2016)
  - "Dragon Blood" (with art by Paul Marshal, in Judge Dredd Megazine #380-383, 2017)
  - "NOW" (with art by Paul Marshal, in Judge Dredd Megazine #385-390, 2017)
  - "Death's Dark Angels" (with art by Jake Lynch, in 2000 AD #2100, 2018)
  - "Jordan Ramzy's Kitchen" (with art by Inaki Miranda, in Judge Dredd Megazine, #400)
  - "Judge Dredd: The Movie" (with art by Jake Lynch, in 2000 AD #2150, 2019)
- The Helltrekkers (with José Ortiz, in 2000 AD # 387–415, 1984–1985)
- Mean Team (in 2000 AD # 437–447, 1985)
- Mazeworld (with Arthur Ranson):
  - "Book I" (in 2000 AD #1014–1023, 1996)
  - "Book II" (in 2000 AD #1101–1110, 1998)
  - "Book III" (in 2000 AD #1151–1160, 1999)
- Bad City Blue (in 2000 AD # 468–477, 1986)
- Tales from Mega-City One:
  - Tales from Mega-City One (in 2000 AD # 523, 525–26, 532–34 & 539, 1987)
  - Tales from Mega-City One (in 2000 AD # 605, 1988)
- Tales from the Doghouse (in 2000 AD # 578-79, 1988)
- Judge Corey (in 2000 AD Sci-Fi Special 1989)
- Judge Hershey (in Judge Dredd Mega-Special # 2, 1989)
- Max Normal (in Judge Dredd Annual #1981-1983, 1980-1982)
- The Mean Machine (Judge Dredd Annual #1982-1983, 1981-1982)
- Jonathan Livingston Dog-Vulture (Judge Dredd Annual 1991, 1990)
- Durham Red (with Carlos Ezquerra):
  - "Island of the Damned" (in 2000 AD #762–773, 1991)
  - "The Golden Mile" (in 2000AD Yearbook 1993)
  - "The 'Nobody Wants This Job' Job" (in 2000 AD #1785-1790, 2012)
- Middenface McNulty: "Wan Man an' His Dug" (co-author Tony Luke and artist John McCrea, in Judge Dredd Megazine vol.1 #15–20, 1991–1992)
- Armageddon: The Bad Man (in Judge Dredd Megazine vol.2 #1–7, 1992)
- BLAIR One (with art from Simon Davis):
  - "Blair Force One" (in 2000 AD #1071–1074, 1997)
  - "Criminal Record" (in 2000 AD #1084, 1998)
  - "He Died with his Boots on" (in 2000 AD #1097–1098, 1998)
- Young Middenface:
  - "Grannibal!" (with pencils by Patrick Goddard and inks Dylan Teague, in Judge Dredd Megazine #3.76, 2001)
  - "Tambo Shanter" (with pencils by Patrick Goddard, inks Dylan Teague and colours by Richard Elson, in Judge Dredd Megazine #4.11, 2002)
  - "A Parcel of Rogues" (with pencils by Patrick Goddard, inks Dylan Teague, in Judge Dredd Megazine #4.16–4.18, 2002)
  - "Mutopia" (with John Ridgway, in Judge Dredd Megazine #205–207, 2003)
  - "Brigadoom!" (with pencils by Patrick Goddard, inks Dylan Teague, in Judge Dredd Megazine #218–220, 2004)
  - "Killoden" (with John Ridgway, in Judge Dredd Megazine #224–229, 2004–2005)
  - "Midnapped!" (with Shaun Thomas, in Judge Dredd Megazine #234–236, 2005)
  - "A Scottish Sojer" (with Shaun Thomas, in Judge Dredd Megazine #240–243, 2006)
- Juliet November (in Judge Dredd Megazine #202–204, 2003)
- Apocalypse Soon (in Judge Dredd Megazine #204–214, 2003–2004)
- The Bogie Man: "Return to Casablanca" (in Judge Dredd Megazine #227–233, 2005)
- Whatever Happened to?: "Melda Dreepe" (in Judge Dredd Megazine #230, 2005)
- Tales from the Black Museum (in Judge Dredd Megazine #256, 2007)
- What if...? (In 2000 AD #1772-1773, 2012)

=== Eagle ===
- Doomlord (in Eagle # 1–13, 20 – 40, 49 – 67, 79 – 93 and continuing, 1982–83)
- Joe Soap (in Eagle # 12–22, 41–45, 1982)
- Manix (in Eagle # 24–31, 41 – 64, 68–77, 79 to 93 and continuing, 1982–84)
- The House of Daemon (in Eagle # 25–47, 1982–83)
- Gil Hazzard – Codename Scorpio (in Eagle # 49–67, 1983)
- Computer Warrior (1985–1988)

=== Dark Horse Comics ===
- Dark Horse Presents #138 (1998)
- The Terminator #1-4 (1998-1999)
- The Terminator: Death Valley #1 (1998)
- The Terminator: The Dark Years #1-4 (1999)

=== DC Comics ===
- Outcasts (with co-author John Wagner, and pencils by Cam Kennedy, 12-issue limited series, DC Comics, 1987–1988)
- Action Comics Weekly #636-641 (1989)
- Secret Origins Special (1989)
- Detective Comics #583-597, 601-621, 627, 641-642,1000(Deluxe Edition), Annual #5 (#583-587 with co-author John Wagner, 1988–1992, 2019)
- Batman vs. Judge Dredd: Judgement on Gotham (1991)
- Batman #448-449, 455-466, 470-471, 474-476, 479-480, Annual #15-16 (24 issues, DC Comics, 1990-1992)
- Batman: Legends of the Dark Knight #38,52-53,89-90, Annual #6 (1992-1997)
- Robin Annual #1 (1992)
- Showcase '93 #12 (1993)
- Showcase '94 #3-4,8-10 (1994)
- Showcase '95 #9 (1995)
- Batman/Spawn: War Devil (DC-Image Comics) (1994)
- The Batman Adventures #31 (1995)
- The Batman Chronicles #1-3,5 (1995-1996)
- Batman: Shadow of the Bat #0-82, 1,000,000, Annual #1-5 (82 issues, DC Comics, 1992–1999) collected as:
  - Batman: The Last Arkham (collects Shadow of the Bat #1–4, 1992, tpb, 1996)
    - Batman: The Tyrant (collects Shadow of the Bat Annual Volume 1 #2, 1994)
- Lobo #1-4 (1990-1991)
- Lobo #0-64, 1,000,000, Annual #1-3 (65 issues, DC Comics, 1993-1999)
- Lobo Paramilitary Christmas Special (1992)
- Lobo's Back #1-4 (1992)
- Lobo Blazing Chain of Love (1992)
- Lobo Infanticable #1-4 (1992-1993)
- Lobo: Portrait of a Victim (1993)
- Lobo: Unamerican Gladiators #1-4 (1993)
- Lobo Convention Special (1993)
- Lobocop (1994)
- Lobo: A Contract on Gawd #1-4 (1994)
- Lobo: In the Chair (1994)
- Lobo/Deadman: The Brave and the Bald (1995)
- Lobo: Bounty Hunting for Fun and Profit (1995)
- Lobo's Big Babe Spring Break Special (1995)
- Lobo: I Quit (1995)
- Lobo/Judge Dredd: Psycho Bikers vs. the Mutents From Hell (1996)
- Lobo Goes to Hollywood (1996)
- Lobo/Demon - Hellowe'en (1996)
- Lobo: Death and Taxes #1-4 (1996-1997)
- Lobo/Mask (DC-Dark Horse Comics) (1997)
- Lobo: Chained (1997)
- Lobo: Fragtaatic Voyage (1997)
- The Demon #1-21, 23-25, 30-39, Annual #1 (1990-1993)
- L.E.G.I.O.N. #1-39, 50-51, Annual #1-2 (41 issues, DC Comics, 1989-1993)
- Batman / Judge Dredd: Vendetta in Gotham (DC / Fleetway, 1993)
- Green Arrow #84-85 (1994)
- Jude Dredd: Legends of the Law #1-4 (1994-1995)
- Batman: Mitefall (1995)
- Nightwing: Alfred's Return (1995)
- Bob, the Galactic Bum (with co-author John Wagner and art by Carlos Ezquerra, 4-issue mini-series, DC, 1995)
- Batman / Judge Dredd: The Ultimate Riddle (DC / Fleetway, 1995)
- Catwoman #26 (1995)
- Underworld Unleashed: Batman - Devil's Asylum (1995)
- Tank Girl: Apocalypse #1–4 (Vertigo, 1995–1996)
- Batman: Demon (1996)
- Re-Loaded (1996)
- Batman/Phantom Stranger (with Arthur Ranson, one-shot, DC Comics, 1997)
- Anarky (vol.1) #1–4 (1997)
- The Book of Fate #9-12 (1997-1998)
- New Year's Evil: Mr. Mxyzptlk (1998)
- Batman: The Abduction (1998)
- Batman / Judge Dredd: Die Laughing (1998)
- Batman: Arkham Asylum - Tales of Madness (1998)
- Batman 80-Page Giant #1 (1998)
- Batman: Scottish Connection (1998)
- Batman Villains Secret Files and Origins (1998)
- DCU Heroes Secret Files and Origins (1999)
- DCU Villains Secret Files and Origins (1999)
- Tattered Banners #1-4 (Vertigo, 1998-1999)
- Batman: Anarky (1999)
- Anarky (vol.2) #1–8 (1999)
- Batman & Demon A Tragedy (Elseworlds) (2000)
- Batman/Lobo (Elseworlds) (2000)
- The Batman of Arkham (Elseworlds) (2000)
- Batman: Dreamland (2000)
- Superman vs. The Terminator: Death to the Future (with pencils by Steve Pugh and inks by Mike Perkins, 4-issue mini-series, DC Comics and Dark Horse Comics, 1999-2000)
- Batman/Scarface: A Psychodrama (2001)
- "The Bat no More...?" (with Enrique Breccia, in Batman: Gotham Knights #16, 2001, collected in Batman: Black & White Volume 2)
- JLA: Riddle of the Beast (with various artists: Carl Critchlow, Simon Davis, Glenn Fabry, Jon Foster, Rafael Garres, Doug Alexander Gregory, Michael William Kaluta, Hermann Mejia, Jim Murray, Alessandro Orlandelli, Andrew Robinson, Liam Sharp, Greg Staples, Saverio Tenuta, John Watson, Martin Williams, Elseworlds DC Comics, hardcover, 2001, paperback, 2003)
- DC Retroactive: Batman – The '90s #1 (2011)
- Batman/Daredevil: King of New York (Marvel-DC crossover) (2000)
- The Authority/Lobo: Jingle Hell (DC-Wildstorm) (2004)
- The Authority/Lobo: Spring Break Massacre (DC-Wildstorm) (2005)

=== Image Comics ===
- Images of Shadowhawk #1-3 (1993-1994)

=== Marvel Comics ===
- Cliver Barker's Night Breed #1-4 (1990)
- Incredible Hulk Annual #16 (1990)
- Robocop #1-10 (1990)
- Robocop 2: Comic Adaptation (1990)
- Silver Surfer Vol 3 #39 (1990)
- Nick Fury, Agent S.H.I.E.L.D Vol 3 #11 (1990)
- Punisher: Blood on the Moors (1991)
- Lobo the Duck (Marvel-DC) (1997)

=== Other ===
- Doctor Who: "Invaders From Gantac" (with pencils by Martin Griffiths and inks by Cam Smith, in Doctor Who Magazine #148–150, 1989)
- The Last American (with co-author John Wagner and art by Mike McMahon, 4-issue mini-series, Epic Comics, 1990–1991, tpb, Com.x, 2004)
- The Chronicles of Genghis Grimtoad (with co-writer John Wagner and art by Ian Gibson, in Strip (Marvel UK), 1990, collected as a Marvel Graphic Novel)
- Makabre (with Enrique Alcatena. in Toxic! #7–11, 16–18, 1991)
- Buzzz (in Purnell's Book of Horror Stories, 1983, ISBN 0361057709)
- Garbage Man (with David Pugh, in Toxic! #27–29, September–October 1991)
- The Bogie Man (with co-author John Wagner and art by Robin Smith):
  - The Bogie Man (John Brown Publishing, 128 pages, 1991, ISBN 1-870870-21-2)
  - Chinatoon (Toxic! #2–9, 1991, started by Cam Kennedy, redrawn and completed by Smith, Atomeka Press, 112 pages, 1993, ISBN 1-85809-006-7)
  - The Manhattan Project (Toxic! #11–21, 1991, Tundra Publishing, 52 pages, 1992, ISBN 1-85809-001-6)
  - The Bogie Man (collects the first volume and Chinatoon, Pocket Books, 224 pages, 1998, ISBN 0-671-00923-0)
  - "Return to Casablanca" (Judge Dredd Megazine #227–233, 2005)
- Dominator (with co-author and art by Tony Luke, in Monthly Afternoon, 1993–1994)
- Psychonauts (with co-author Tony Luke (#3) and artist Motofumi Kobayashi, 4-issue mini series, Epic Comics, 1993–1994)
- Negative Burn #48 (Caliber Comics, 1997)
- Brodie's Law (Pulp Theatre, 2005)
- Evil Ernie in Santa Fe #1-4 (Devil's Due Publishing, 2005-2006)
- Kidnapped - The Graphic Novel (Waverley Books, 2007)
- Jeremiah Harm (with co-author Keith Giffen and art by Rafael Albuquerque and Rael Lyra, 5-issue mini-series, Boom! Studios, trade paperback, 128 pages, August 2007, ISBN 1-4276-0686-2)
- Lego Rock Raiders: High Adventure, Deep Underground (with art by Robin Smith, 48 page graphic novel, Lego Systems Incorporated, 2000)
- Strange Case of Dr Jekyll and Mr Hyde (Waverley Books, 2008)
- Wasted (Bad Press Ltd, 2008)
- The Dead: Kingdom of Flies #1-4 (with art by Simon Bisley, Berserker Comics, 2008-2009)
- Church of Hell #1-2 (with Wayne Nichols and Simon Bisley, Berserker Comics, 2009)
- The Loxleys and the War of 1812 (Renegade Arts Entertainment, 2012)
- Tales of the Buddha before he was enlightend (Renegade Arts Entertainment, 2013)
- Channel Evil (Renegade Arts Entertainment, 2013)
- Scott vs Zombies (Artlink, 2013)
- Rok of the Reds (Black Hearted Press Comics, 2016)
- Scott vs Demons (Artlink, 2017)
- Rok of the God (Black Hearted Press Comics, 2020)
- The Battle of Britain Special #2020 (Rebellion, 2020)

== TV and film ==
As well as adaptations of his work, both official (Bogie Man) and unofficial (The Lobo Paramilitary Christmas Special) he has also written directly for film and television:

- Archangel Thunderbird (1998)
- Ace Lightning (2002)
- Dominator:
  - Dominator (2003)
  - Dominator X (2007)
- Action Man: Robot ATAK (2004)
