= Kipling (disambiguation) =

Rudyard Kipling (1865–1936) was a British author.

Kipling can also refer to

== People ==
- John Kipling (1897–1915), son of Rudyard Kipling
- John Lockwood Kipling (1837–1911), father of Rudyard Kipling
- Alice Kipling (1837–1910), mother of Rudyard Kipling

== Places ==
=== Canada ===
==== Saskatchewan ====
- Kipling, Saskatchewan, a town in Saskatchewan
  - Kipling Airport, an airport near Kipling, Saskatchewan

==== Toronto ====
- Kipling Avenue, a street in Toronto and York Region
  - Kipling station, a station on the Toronto subway system
  - Kipling GO Station, a GO Train commuter rail station in Toronto

=== United States ===
- Kipling, Michigan, an unincorporated community
- Kipling, Ohio, an unincorporated community in Center Township, Guernsey County, Ohio, United States
- Colorado State Highway 391, also known as Kipling Street

== Other ==
- Mr Kipling, a brand of baked goods in the United Kingdom
- Kipling House, a boarding house at Haileybury and Imperial Service College, a public school near Hertford, England
- Harry Kipling, a character in 2000 AD, a British science-fiction comic
- HMS Kipling (F91), a British K-class destroyer named after the author and sunk in the Second World War
- Rudyard Kipling (ship), British steam trawler sunk in 1939
- Kipling (brand), Belgian bag brand
- Kipling (crater), a crater on planet Mercury
- Bagheera kiplingi, a species of jumping spider
- Willoughby Kipling, a fictional character by DC Comics
