= Dark Empire =

Star Wars comic book metaseries

- Dark Empire I (Trade Paperback)

Publication information
- Publisher: Dark Horse Comics
- Schedule: Monthly
- Title(s): Dark Empire I Dark Empire II; Empire's End
- Formats: Original material for the series has been published as a set of limited series.
- Genre: Science fiction
- Publication date: Dark Empire I December 1991 – October 1992; Dark Empire II; December 1994 – May 1995; Empire's End; October–November 1995
- Number of issues: Dark Empire I: 6 Dark Empire II: 6 Empire's End: 2

Creative team
- Writer(s): Tom Veitch
- Artist(s): Dark Empire I and Dark Empire II; Cam Kennedy; Empire's End; Jim Baikie

Reprints
- Collected editions
- Dark Empire I: ISBN 1-56971-073-2
- Dark Empire Trilogy: ISBN 1-59582-612-2

Dark Empire is a Star Wars-themed metaseries of comic books produced by Dark Horse Comics. It consists of a six-issue limited series written by Tom Veitch and drawn by Cam Kennedy, followed by a second six-issue limited series by Veitch and Kennedy, followed in turn by a two-issue limited series written by Veitch and drawn by Jim Baikie. The initial series is notable for being one of the first Star Wars comics to be produced by Dark Horse, which retained the comic rights to the franchise for over two decades.

Part of the Star Wars Expanded Universe, the trilogy picks up six years after the events of Return of the Jedi and just a year after Timothy Zahn's Thrawn trilogy (1991–1993). The story deals with the resurrection of primary series antagonist Palpatine, revealed to have cheated death by transferring his spirit into a succession of cloned bodies. Other highlights include Luke Skywalker temporarily succumbing to the dark side of the Force, the return of Boba Fett (who seemingly died in Return of the Jedi), and the first appearance of Princess Leia and Han Solo's youngest son Anakin Solo.

The series received mixed-to-positive reviews, and is credited as helping revive interest in the franchise in the early 1990s. Audio dramas and action figures were produced, and the series has been referenced in various other Star Wars media. As of 2000, over 100,000 issues had been printed. Although the comic was amongst many works declared non-canon to the franchise in 2014, the final film of the Skywalker Saga, 2019’s The Rise of Skywalker, utilized the plot element of Palpatine returning via cloning.

== Publication history ==
The Dark Empire I story was originally developed by Tom Veitch and Cam Kennedy for Marvel Comics. Veitch and Kennedy were approached by Lucasfilm based on their success with The Light and Darkness War. After difficulties with Marvel, the project was picked up by Dark Horse Comics. According to Veitch, he pitched franchise creator George Lucas the idea of a different character wearing Darth Vader's armor, which Lucas rejected but said he would allow Palpatine's return, as well as his use of a clone body. However, Star Wars Insider's series of retrospectives on the creation of the series in 2015 clarified that Veitch's editorial contact throughout the development of the series was Lucy Autrey Wilson. This was further illuminated in 2022, when Wilson spoke about the development of the series, saying: "Tom Veitch, the story he wrote... You know, we were kind of letting people do what they wanted then. He wrote his story. I didn't ask George anything."

Dark Empire I was a six-issue limited series published bimonthly in 1991 and 1992. Dark Empire II was also a six-issue limited series published from 1994 to 1995. The final installment, Empire's End, was a two-issue limited series published in 1995. The trilogy is set after Timothy Zahn's Thrawn trilogy, which was published from 1991 to 1993.

The individual comic issues each feature several pages of prose "endnotes" that provide additional background for the story, such as contextualizing Palpatine's goals and worldview through excerpts of encyclopedic volumes called the Dark Side Compendium written from his in-universe perspective. (Note: A Guide to the Star Wars Universe (1998) explains that while he was on Byss, Luke Skywalker read all three completed volumes of the hundreds the Emperor had planned. These are titled The Book of Anger, The Weakness of Inferiors, and The Creation of Monsters.)

=== Collections ===
The various series have been collected into trade paperbacks:

- Dark Empire (collects Star Wars: Dark Empire #1–6, 182 pages, May 1993, ISBN 1-56971-073-2)
- Dark Empire II (collects Star Wars: Dark Empire II #1–6, 168 pages, September 1995, ISBN 1-56971-119-4)
- Empire's End (collects Star Wars: Empire's End #1–2, 64 pages, September 1997, ISBN 1-56971-306-5)

The entire metaseries has also been collected into a single hardcover, which also includes Star Wars Handbook 3: Dark Empire, a collection of illustrated essays on the characters, locations, and other elements of the story:

- Dark Empire Trilogy (352 pages, Dark Horse Comics, September 2010, ISBN 1-59582-612-2, Titan Books, December 2010, ISBN 1-84856-887-8)

It was collected again under Marvel's Epic Collection as Volume 5 of the New Republic series. This volume collects the three parts of the Dark Empire storyline, as well as some strips from Star Wars Tales, and the Star Wars Handbooks for X-Wing Squadron and Dark Empire (496 Pages, Marvel Comics, March 2021, ISBN 978-1302926984).

== Plot ==
=== Dark Empire ===
Six years after the events of Return of the Jedi, the Millennium Falcon leads a Rebel task force to Coruscant. Han Solo, Leia Organa, Chewbacca, and C-3PO are heading to the planet to rescue Luke Skywalker, R2-D2 and Lando Calrissian, who have spent the past several days holding out against Imperial attacks after an earlier raid using the captured Star Destroyer Liberator goes awry and the warship crashes. The Rebels successfully rescue the survivors, but a massive energy storm appears. Luke sees the storm as a large disturbance in the Force, and asks everybody to leave him behind; he lets himself be devoured by the storm.

The taskforce returns to the Rebel fleet in the Da Soocha system. Rebel commanders discuss the appearance of the Imperials coming out of the Deep Core and discover that Admiral Ackbar's homeworld of Mon Calamari is now under attack by a fleet of Imperial war machines. Called the World Devastators, the machines are designed to convert everything in their path into raw materials for building more war machines on the spot. Lando leads another taskforce with a second captured Star Destroyer leading the charge to aid in Mon Calamari's defense.

Meanwhile, Luke awakes from the light of the Force storm and finds out he is aboard an old Imperial prison ship heading to Byss. The ship docks and Luke is closely escorted to a chamber, where he is stunned to see Emperor Palpatine alive. The Emperor explains that he has revived himself in a clone body and makes Luke doubt any attempt to kill him knowing he will quickly manifest in another clone. Sensing the futility and seeing the horror of what is happening on Mon Calamari, Luke humbly surrenders to becoming the Emperor's new apprentice, intending to destroy the Empire from within.

Leia has visions of Luke being pulled to the dark side of the Force and wants to travel to Byss and save him. She and Han travel to Nar Shaddaa and try to arrange a ship to bring them past Byss' security network. Han reunites with smuggler friends Shug Ninx, Salla Zend, and Mako Spince to make it happen. Along the way, an old woman named Vima-da-Boda—a former Jedi who survived the Empire's purge—feels Leia's Force energy and gives her an old Jedi artifact. However, the Hutts have put a large bounty on Han and Leia, with Spince selling him out to Boba Fett (revealed to have survived being devoured by the sarlacc during the events of Return of the Jedi); the two escape Nar Shaddaa aboard Salla's ship, the Starlight Intruder, with the Falcon attached. The Intruder has the proper codes to get inside Byss, and Imperial security lets them in (but lock out a pursuing Fett). Han, Leia, Chewie, and the droids are brought before Luke and Palpatine.

Leia discovers that he holds hostage an even greater treasure: a mysterious and intelligent artifact called the Jedi Holocron, a holographic cube that contains historical information about the Jedi. When Leia discovers that Palpatine is interested in possessing her third child, she steals the Holocron and the group successfully breaks out of Byss while having to leave behind Luke again. Luke faces the already frail Palpatine and destroys his clone tanks, but Palpatine possesses one living clone and subdues him to his will.

Han's group travels to Mon Calamari as Rebel commando forces lay siege to the World Devastators, which have been shut down by a special master code Luke was able to steal and give to R2 and C3PO for transmission to the machines. The Imperials aboard the machines still have the factories running and attack the Rebels. R2 rigs the World Devastators to destroy each other.

As the Rebels celebrate on Mon Calamari, Alliance command determines that the World Devastators are part of a larger Imperial offensive to conquer the galaxy. Leia studies the Holocron and sees an old prophecy about a pregnant woman coming to save the Jedi from doom. At the same time, a small Imperial fleet, led by the massive flagship Eclipse, appears above Da Soocha. The Emperor demands that the Alliance surrender Leia to him and Luke. Leia travels on her own and appeals to Luke to break away from the Emperor. Palpatine creates a large Force storm to destroy the Rebel fleet, but Leia and Luke work together to amplify the storm beyond the Emperor's power and turn it against him. The siblings escape the doomed warship, and as Luke sees the last remnants of the Eclipse being vaporized, he declares the Jedi Knights will rise again.

=== Dark Empire II ===
With Emperor Palpatine apparently perishing aboard the Eclipse, more worlds defy Imperial edicts, especially those that have been recently reconquered. One of these is the arms manufacturing planet Balmorra, whose planetary governor, Beltane, has begun supplying the Rebels with the latest military vehicles, such as the Viper X1 Automadon, a war droid designed to convert energy from enemy laser fire into power for its own turbolaser cannons. The Emperor's Dark Side Executor Sedriss leads a force to subdue the planet, but Beltane's troops hold the line and Sedriss is compelled to negotiate a supply agreement with him. Sedriss returns to Byss, where he kills two Dark Side Adepts who've been killing other clones of Emperor Palpatine that Luke missed. Palpatine possesses one clone to Sedriss' surprise and orders the Imperial offensive to continue.

Having pledged to reestablish the Jedi Order by finding any surviving Jedi in the galaxy, Luke Skywalker returns to Pinnacle Base on the moon Da Soocha V (orbiting Da Soocha in the Cyax System of Hutt Space of the Outer Rim) with Kam Solusar, a former Dark Jedi. Beltane tips the Rebel Alliance of a shipment of new Vipers bound for the Empire's Deep Core stronghold of Byss, and Alliance commanders accept Wedge Antilles' suggestion of intercepting the shipment for a surgical strike using the droids, with Rebel commandos in the attack. Although Luke presses for liberating more worlds to provide more staging areas for an all-out strike on Byss, Mon Mothma asks him to concentrate on rebuilding the Jedi Order instead. The Jedi Holocron educates Luke about the planet Ossus, a former Jedi-populated world destroyed by the Sith thousands of years earlier.

Han, Leia and Chewie fly back to Nar Shaddaa to find Vima-da-Boda, at least where Leia last saw her. However, Vima has disappeared and every bounty hunter on the moon is still out for them, including Boba Fett, as well as an Imperial force led by two Dark Side Elites. Leia successfully fetches Vima after flying into the deeper reaches of Nar Shaddaa. Aboard Nar Shaddaa's traffic control tower, Mako Spince sees Han and guides an Imperial Star Destroyer's tractor beam on him. Han turns the tables by flying close to the tower, forcing the tractor beam to lock onto the structure and pull it instead at full power. The tower impales the Star Destroyer and it crashes into Nar Shaddaa. Fett, back in his old ship Slave I, chases the Millennium Falcon into a nearby acidic gas cloud. Han takes the risk and flies into the cloud, surprisingly appearing on the other side and stumbling onto the long-lost world of Ganath. Ganathan engineers repair the Falcon and equip it with a lightning cannon while the team meets Ganath's ruler, Empatojayos Brand, a veteran Jedi who survived the Empire's Jedi Purge. Inspired by the possibility of a Jedi rebirth, Brand joins Han's party while leaving Ganath in the hands of a military officer. Han takes out Fett and heads to a secret hideout on New Alderaan, where Han and Leia's twin children are under care.

Luke and Kam fly to Ossus and chances upon the Ysanna, a warrior tribe which has rudimentary Force powers. They fight off the Ysanna attacks and sensing they are indeed Jedi, the Ysanna chief welcomes them. Having known about the trip, Palpatine orders Sedriss and fellow Dark Side Elite Vill Goir to capture them. Solusar kills Goir, but Sedriss takes one of the Ysanna hostage and leans against a tree. To everybody's surprise, the tree is a millennia-old Neti Jedi Master named Ood Bnar, who wraps Sedriss in a fatal embrace and they die in an explosion of Force energy. Bnar's heroic sacrifice leaves a part of him in the soil and a hole underneath his location reveals an old cache of lightsabers; Luke successfully discovers an old Jedi library. Two Ysanna tribe members, siblings Ralf and Jem, join Luke and Kam in leaving the planet with their elders' blessing.

Lando leads the Rebel infiltration into Byss and start the attack when the Viper droids are offloaded. The droids prove superior to existing Imperial defenses until Palpatine releases an army of dark side-mutated monsters on the attackers. The Vipers, which are attuned against energy attacks, are cut to shreds under the monsters' mauling. Salla Zend and Shug Ninx mobilizes fellow smugglers nearby to rescue the Rebel strike group and escape Byss.

On New Alderaan, Leia prepares for the birth of her third child as Han and Chewie attempt to rendezvous with Lando's group. Luke's party arrives with grim news: he had reached Da Soocha to see a large missile appear and destroy the planet, with the Rebel Alliance command presumably killed. He uses the time to train the Ysanna siblings as Kam and Empatojayos practice their Jedi skills as well. Unknown to them, Palpatine's Dark Side Elites have tortured a Rebel pilot into revealing the location of New Alderaan. Palpatine sees this as an opportunity to capture the Skywalker siblings and Leia's offspring in one fell swoop. The Darksiders attempt to poison Luke, but Vima saves him as the entire settlement goes into action to fight the Imperials, who have deployed AT-ATs as backup. In the course of the fighting, Jem is killed and Rayf saves Leia's twins from being kidnapped. The Millennium Falcon and Lando's forces arrive and defeat the Imperial assault, then evacuate the New Alderaan survivors.

The Rebels relocate to the space stations of Nespis VIII, where they discover that the Alliance had evacuated Pinnacle Base before it was destroyed. On Nespis VIII, Han and Leia's son Anakin (named after his deceased grandfather) is born and the Alliance plots the final destruction of the Empire.

=== Empire's End ===
After perishing in battle with Luke and Leia Skywalker in Dark Empire I, Emperor Palpatine is forced to occupy an inferior clone body, since it was the last clone body that remained. Unknown to him, his personal physician had been corrupted by Carnor Jax, backed by a number of other high-ranking Imperial personnel. The physician had deliberately inserted genetic material and contaminants into all stored samples of the Emperor's original body, to the effect that the resulting bodies would be nowhere as resistant to the ravaging effects of the dark side as the original.

The last clone body not destroyed by Skywalker or traitorous Imperials is now aging rapidly, and Palpatine's final end is near, unless he can either fix his genetic material (an impossibility since no unaltered samples remain) or insert his spirit into another body. After consulting with ancient Sith Lords on the mausoleum planet Korriban, Palpatine learns that Han and Leia's youngest child, Anakin, has the only workable body.

Palpatine follows the Solos to Onderon in order to gain a new body, to ensure the future of his rule. A fierce duel occurs between Luke Skywalker and his Jedi team and Palpatine; finally, Han Solo wrongly shoots the Emperor, allowing him to be out of his physical form and get what he wanted: Anakin's body. He desperately tries to send his spirit into the infant Anakin, but he is blocked by the soul of the dying Jedi Empatojayos Brand, who makes the ultimate sacrifice in willingly sending his eternal soul into the "madness beyond death" that is the dark side, to ensure Palpatine would go as well and can never return. Luke then vows to revive the Jedi Order. After the death of Palpatine, a projectile from the Galaxy Gun is shot into Byss (since the crew were frightened by the potential collision, and also misfired), utterly destroying Byss, and destroying the second Eclipse-class Star Destroyer, Eclipse II, which was steered into a collision course with the Galaxy Gun by R2-D2, thus ending the Empire's harsh rule.

== Adaptations ==
In 1994 and 1995 respectively, Time Warner Audio Publishing released audio dramas of the first and second volumes of Dark Empire. The cast was:

- John Cygan – as Luke Skywalker, Wedge Antilles, Vill Goir, Okko and Umak Leth
- Joe Hacker – as Han Solo, Boba Fett, Empatojayos Brand and Lo Khan
- Ann Patricio – as Princess Leia and Mon Mothma
- Nick Jameson – as Emperor Palpatine and Governor Beltane
- Jim Ward – as C-3PO, Kam Solusar and Executor Sedriss
- Glynnis Talken – as Salla Zend, Vima-Da-Boda and Jem Ysanna
- Andy Cowan – as Admiral Ackbar, Zevulon Veers and Baddon Fass
- Billy Dee Williams – as Lando Calrissian

Later in 1995, a Dark Empire: Collector's Edition CD set was released that collected the two Dark Empire audio dramas as well as an exclusive adaptation of Empire's End.

== Impact ==
Along with Timothy Zahn's books, Dark Empire has been credited with sustaining the profitability of Star Wars during the 1990s. By the end of the decade, it had sold over 100,000 copies.

Kenner released four action figures based on the series in 1998: Luke, Leia, Palpatine, and an Imperial sentinel (originally intended to be a new character called 'Atha Prime' for Kenner's aborted 1984 'Power of the Force' line of toys); the cases for each of the figures folded out into 3-D backdrops based on the comic. In 2008, figures of Luke and Palpatine from Dark Empire II were released.

Dark Empire has appeared on a number of lists of best Expanded Universe works. In a review for The Sci-Fi Block, Robert Ring called the series "an essential Star Wars classic" but commented that the ending was rushed. Writing for Tor.com, Ryan Britt stated that the first Dark Empire miniseries was superior to its sequels and praised it for taking stylistic departures from other works.

The later Dark Horse comic Crimson Empire trilogy takes place after and references events from the Dark Empire trilogy.

Following its 2012 acquisition by Disney, in April 2014 Lucasfilm branded most of the licensed Star Wars novels and comics produced since the originating 1977 film as non-canonical 'Legends' to create a clean slate for the sequel trilogy.

Following the release of the final sequel trilogy film, The Rise of Skywalker (2019), several critics interpreted the circumstances of Palpatine's return as amounting to a tribute to Dark Empire. The film's novelization reveals that Palpatine returned using a clone body, much like his return in the comic. Additionally, both the comic and film invoke the spirits of past Jedi to defeat Palpatine permanently.

Although first glimpsed prior to Dark Empire in Marvel's Star Wars comic, Boba Fett's survival was canonically depicted in the second season of The Mandalorian (2020) and its spinoff series The Book of Boba Fett (2022).
