= Gutsville =

- Cover of the first issue

Publication information
- Publisher: Image Comics
- Schedule: Irregular
- Format: Limited series
- Genre: Steampunk
- Publication date: May 2007 -
- No. of issues: 3 (out of 6, as of June 2009)

Creative team
- Created by: Simon Spurrier; Frazer Irving
- Written by: Simon Spurrier
- Artist: Frazer Irving
- Letterer: Frazer Irving
- Colorist: Frazer Irving

Gutsville is a currently on hiatus six issue comic book limited series from Image Comics which began in May 2007. It is written by Simon Spurrier and drawn by Frazer Irving.

== Publication history ==
Spurrier and Irving had worked together on From Grace and The Simping Detective. Spurrier had been looking to break into the American market and Irving seemed the ideal partner because he'd already worked at Marvel and DC. As Irving had spoken to people at Image Comics Spurrier prepared two pitches and Gutsville was picked "because it is more of a high-concept pitch." Soon after getting this accepted, Irving got the job providing art for David Hine's Silent War after the original artist backed out, and as he was using Photoshop for that "I realized Gutsville had to be done in the same way. I won't be able to change gears fast enough. As it turns out, it is the perfect choice. Photoshop gave me just the right tools I need to make it slightly unearthy."

Issue #1 was sold out and went for a second printing in July 2007. Matt Timson provided back-up art for issue #2 cover dated September 2007. There was a six-month delay after issue #2 for personal reasons, with #3 released in March 2008 with a text back-up text story illustrated by Boo Cook. The fourth issue has not yet been released, leading to rumors of cancellation.

== Plot ==
In 1846 an English ship called the Daphne heads out to reach Australia. The ship never makes it, as it, and all of its passengers (including slaves, zealous missionaries, and English settlers) are swallowed up by some gargantuan, oceanic beast. Skip forward to the present day and the descendants of the original passengers are living in Gutsville, a shanty town within the belly of this mysterious creature.

== See also ==
- Leviathan
- Goliath Awaits
- The Watch Below, by James White
- List of steampunk works
