= Tom Veitch =

American writer (1941–2022)

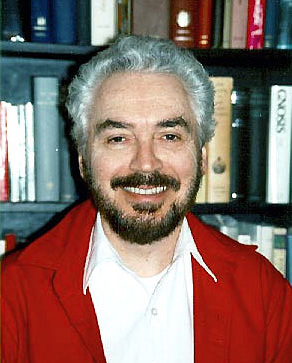
- Born: September 26, 1941 Walpole, New Hampshire, U.S.
- Died: February 14, 2022 (aged 80) Bellows Falls, Vermont, U.S.
- Area: Writer
- Notable works: Star Wars; The Light and Darkness War
- Collaborators: Greg Irons; Cam Kennedy

Tom Veitch (/viːtʃ/; September 26, 1941 – February 14, 2022) was an American writer, known for his work in the comic book industry. He was also a novelist and a poet. He was the brother of comics writer and artist Rick Veitch.

== Early life ==
Veitch was born on September 26, 1941, as the oldest of six children. His family moved from Walpole, New Hampshire, to Bellows Falls, Vermont. He attended Columbia University. While living in New York City, he published his first book Literary Days (1964).

From 1965 to 1968, Veitch was a Benedictine monk at Weston Priory. In 1968, he moved to San Francisco and started a poetry magazine, the Tom Veitch Magazine.

== Comics career ==
Veitch was a contributor to the underground comix movement of the early 1970s. His collaborations with underground comix artist Greg Irons (the creative team known as "GI/TV") included such titles as Legion of Charlies, Deviant Slice and contributions to many other underground comix, including Skull Comix and Slow Death Funnies.

Creator-owned comics by Veitch include The Light and Darkness War with artist Cam Kennedy, published by Marvel Comics and Titan Books, and The Nazz with artist Bryan Talbot, Clash with artist Adam Kubert, and My Name Is Chaos with artist John Ridgway, each published by DC Comics. Also for DC Comics he wrote Animal Man No. 33–50 with art by Steve Dillon, Tom Mandrake, Dick Giordano, David G. Klein, Mark Badger, Brett Ewins, Jim McCarthy and Steve Pugh, as well as two Elseworlds series, Kamandi: At Earth's End and Superman: At Earth's End.

He is known for initiating the Dark Horse Comics line of Star Wars comic books, with Dark Empire and Tales of the Jedi.

The Old Republic era was first introduced by Dark Horse's Tales of the Jedi comic series, the brainchild of writer Tom Veitch, before reaching new heights in the 2003 BioWare RPG, the critically acclaimed Knights of the Old Republic, which itself spawned a sequel titled The Sith Lords, a comic book series of the same name, and the still-active The Old Republic MMORPG.

== Prose and poetry ==
Veitch's novels include: The Luis Armed Story (Full Court Press, 1978); Eat This! (Angel Hair Books, 1974); and Antlers in the Treetops, written with poet Ron Padgett (Coach House Press, 1970). His poetry collection Death College and Other Poems, with an afterword by Allen Ginsberg, was published in 1976 by Bill Berkson's Big Sky Books.

During his years as a Benedictine monk, Veitch formed friendships with two former Trappists. One of those men, whose religious name was Elias, agreed to be interviewed by Tom and discuss his inner spiritual life, covering a period of more than fifty years. The result was the book The Visions of Elias, published in 2016 by Sky River Books.

== Personal life and death ==
Veitch was married to Martha Veitch, and they had a daughter named Angelica.

He died from COVID-19 in Bellows Falls, Vermont, on February 14, 2022, at the age of 80, during the COVID-19 pandemic in Vermont.
