= Capote (crater) =

Crater on Mercury

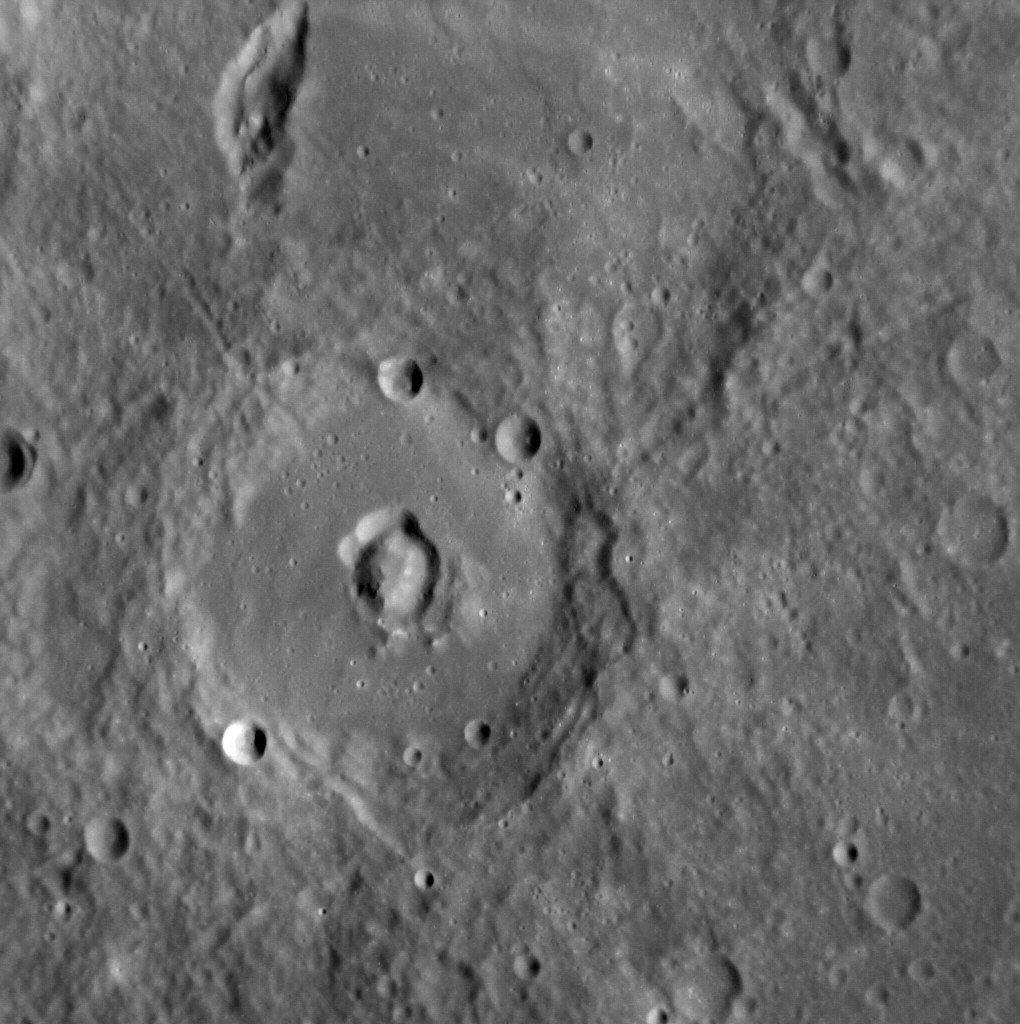
- MESSENGER NAC image
- Planet: Mercury
- Coordinates: 21.1°S 287.59°W
- Quadrangle: Debussy
- Diameter: 88 km (55 mi)
- Eponym: Truman Capote

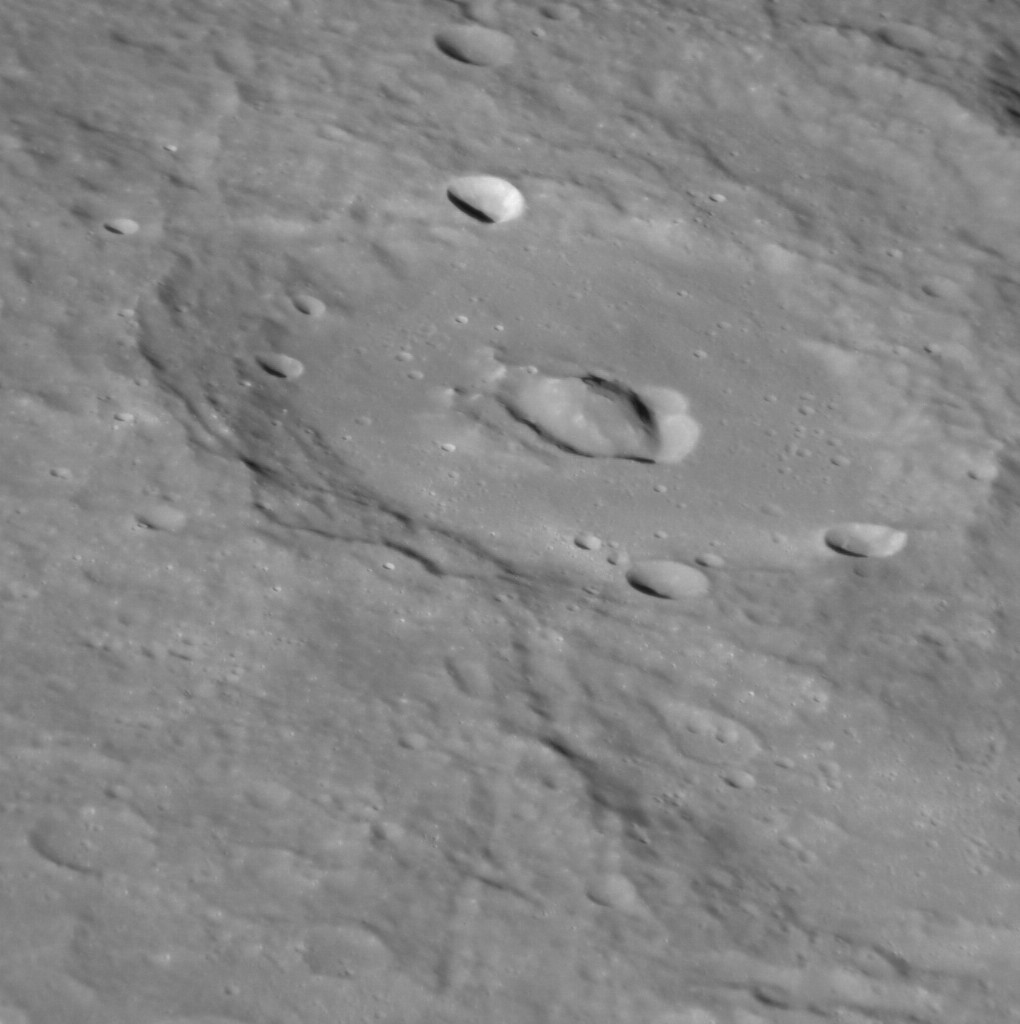
Oblique view

Capote is a crater on Mercury. Its name was adopted by the International Astronomical Union (IAU) in 2013, and is named for the American author Truman Capote.

The central peak of Capote is unusual because a ring-like depression completely surrounds it.

On the north rim of Capote, along its border with Kipling crater, is a dark spot of low reflectance material (LRM), closely associated with hollows.

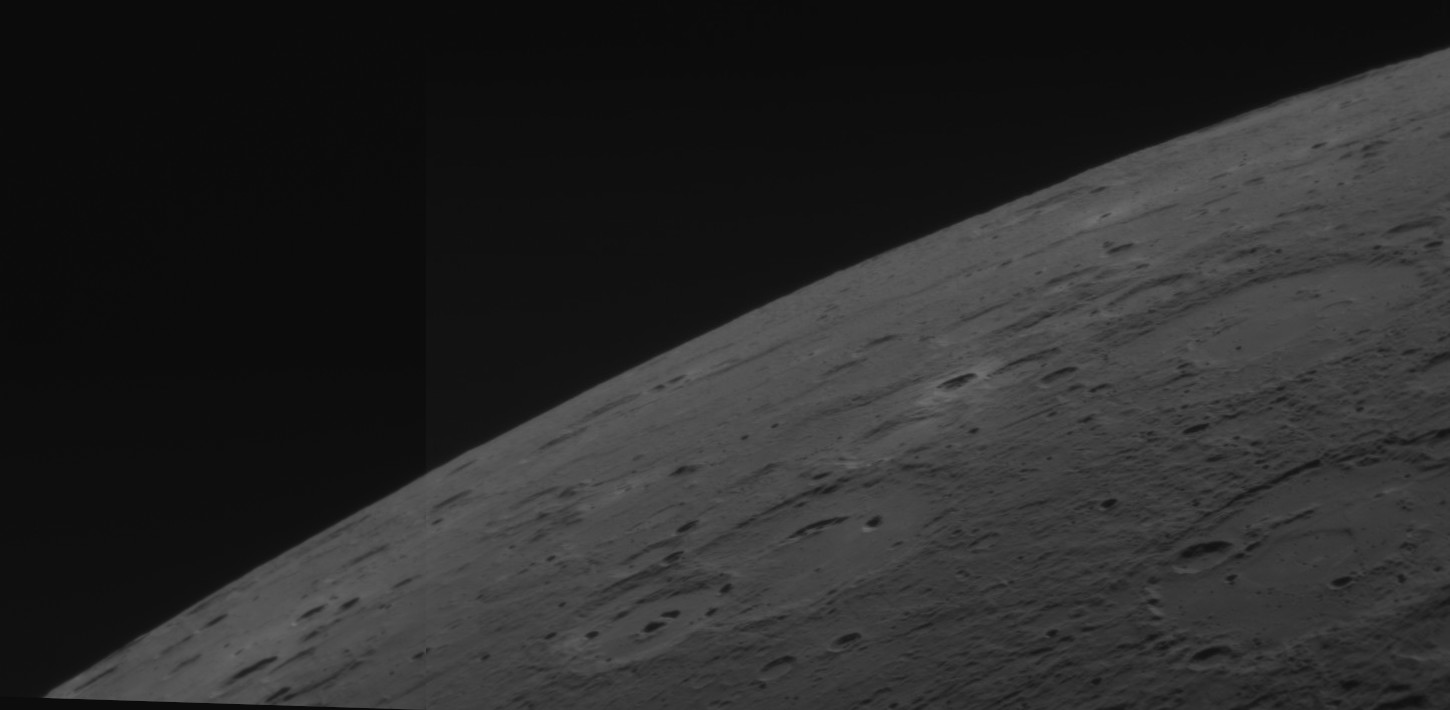
Oblique view from MESSENGER's second flyby in October 2008. Capote is in central foreground.
