= Lobster Random =

Fictional character in the comic 2000 AD

- Lobster Random as seen in the cover of the 2000 AD #1349 by Graham Rolfe

Publication information
- Publisher: Rebellion Developments
- First appearance: 2000 AD #1342
- Created by: Simon Spurrier; Carl Critchlow

Lobster Random is a character in the comic book 2000 AD. He was created by Simon Spurrier and artist Carl Critchlow.

== Overview ==
Ugly of temper and with a pair of claws surgically grafted onto his sides, Lobster Random was a genetically modified soldier, adapted to never need sleep or to feel pain. After being discharged from the military he found his talents lay in the art of torture, and hired out his services for any client who required information and wasn't squeamish about the methods employed to get it. "Lob" is a cranky old bald man with two huge lobster claws emerging from his back, and is part of a long tradition in 2000 AD giving their protagonists a distinctive visual appearance at odds with the comic book stereotype of square-jawed, good-looking action heroes. Lob's character is portrayed as extremely grumpy, cynical and sometimes psychotic (all resulting from both decades without sleep and his experiences during the time after his discharge from the military). Lob has also had his left arm amputated on three separate occasions (twice was this self-inflicted).

The art, by Carl Critchlow, represented a departure from his older painted style and instead used a computer-based line drawing technique that he developed in his self-published Thrud the Barbarian.

Lobster Random debuted in an eight-part adventure in 2003, entitled "No Gain, No Pain" (progs 1342-1349). A hardback collection of this 45-page story was released by Rebellion Developments for the European market in April 2005.

The second series, "Tooth and Claw", ran for nine episodes (with a double-length finale), from progs 1411-1419 (October to December 2004).

The third series was called "The Agony and the Ecstasy".

=== "The Vort" and subsequent series ===
Writing under the pseudonym G. Powell, Spurrier introduced a world called The Vort in its own standalone series. At the conclusion, it was revealed that one of the main characters was a hideously scarred Lobster Random.

It was followed by the fourth series of Lobster Random entitled "The Forget-Me-Knot" starting in prog 1601 in 2008.

== Bibliography ==
The character has appeared in his own eponymous series, the first instalment now reprinted as a trade paperback by Rebellion Developments, and The Vort:

- Lobster Random (by Simon Spurrier and Carl Critchlow):
  - "No Gain, No Pain" (in 2000 AD #1342-1349, 2003, tpb, 48 pages, March 2005, ISBN 1-904265-63-4)
  - "Tooth and Claw" (in 2000 AD #1411-1419, 2004)
  - "The Agony & The Ecstasy" (in 2000 AD #1482-1490, 2006)
  - "The Forget-Me-Knot" (in 2000 AD #1601-1610, 2008)
- The Vort (by G. Powell and D'Israeli, in 2000 AD #1589-1596, 2008)
