= Simon Spurrier =

British comics writer and novelist (born 1981)

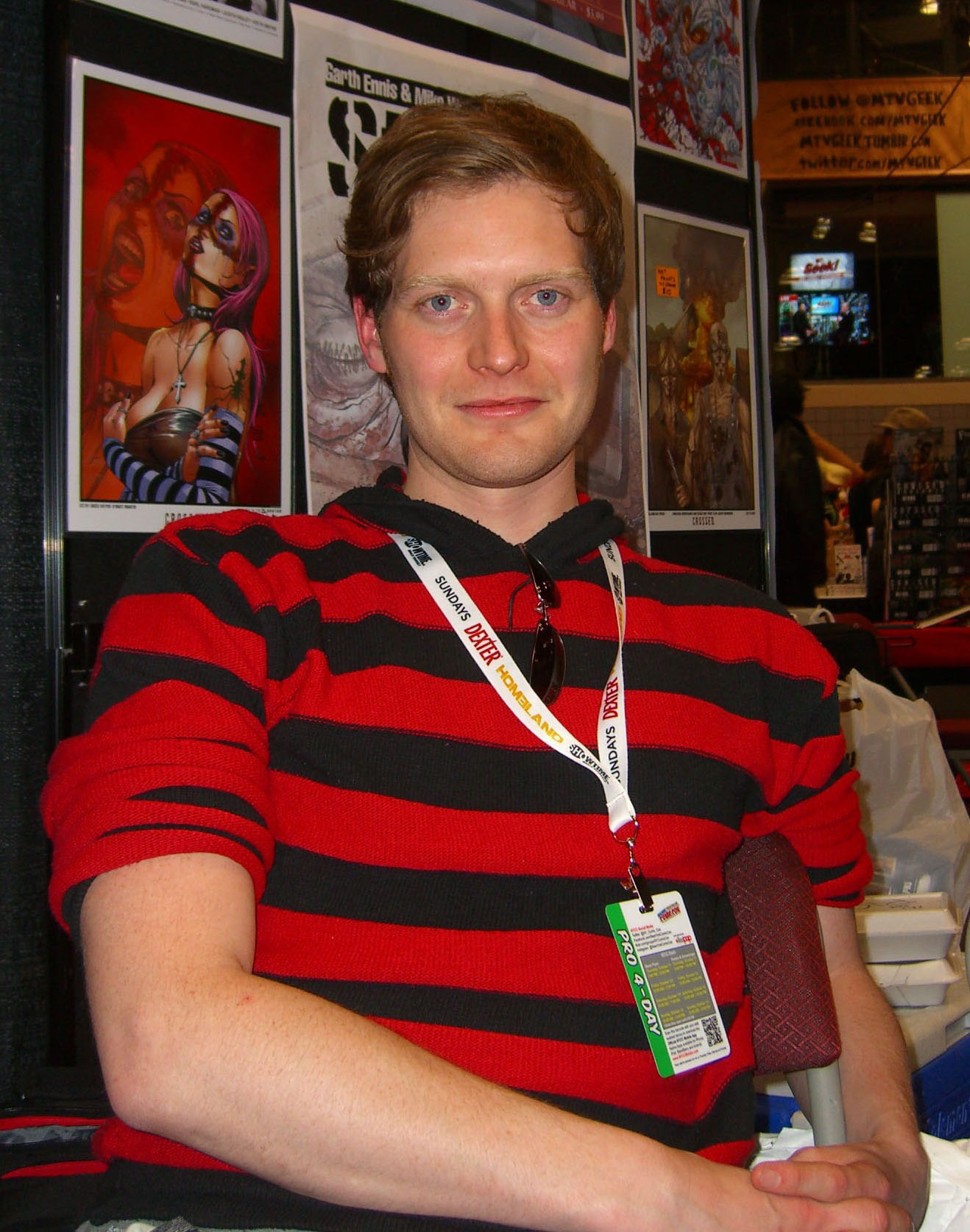
- Spurrier at the 2012 New York Comic Con
- Born: 2 May 1981 (age 45)
- Occupations: Comic book writer, novelist
- Writing career
- Period: 2001–present
- Genres: Comic book, science fiction
- Notable works: Lobster Random; Bec & Kawl; The Simping Detective; Harry Kipling; Contract; Star Wars: Doctor Aphra
- Website: www.simonspurrier.com

Simon "Si" Spurrier (born 2 May 1981) is a British comics writer and novelist, who has previously worked as a cook, a bookseller, and an art director for the BBC.

Getting his start in comics with the British small press, he went on to write his own series for 2000 AD, like Lobster Random, Bec & Kawl, The Simping Detective and Harry Kipling, as well as a number of stories for the flagship character Judge Dredd. In recent years he has broken into the American comic book industry, writing mainly for Marvel Comics. He also wrote Marvel's X-Force in 2014 and 2015, which starred the characters Cable, Psylocke, Marrow and Fantomex.

He started co-writing Star Wars: Doctor Aphra from Marvel Comics with Kieron Gillen in November 2017 on issues #14-19, taking over with issue #20 in May 2018.

Simon has also written a number of novels, initially on other people's properties, but in 2006 he signed a two-book contract with Hodder Headline, the first of which was Contract (2007) and the second A Serpent Uncoiled (2011).

== Career ==
Simon Spurrier writes mainly for the British comic 2000 AD but has also written comic-strips for the anthology Warhammer Monthly, as well as contributing written articles, stories and reviews to the Judge Dredd Megazine. He is the creator of Lobster Random (with Carl Critchlow), The Simping Detective (with Frazer Irving), From Grace (also with Irving), Zancudo (a belated follow-up to Ant Wars) with Cam Kennedy and Bec & Kawl (with Steve Roberts).

Spurrier has done a number of work for hire books, writing one 2000 AD themed novel for Black Flame press, and three science fiction novels for the Black Library, as well as an upcoming book for Abaddon Books. In May 2006 he signed a two-book contract with Hodder Headline. The first novel, a "post-pulp" occult-crime-comedy, is titled Contract. A limited edition hardback was released in May 2007, and the mass-market paperback is published on 4 October 2007.

He has created Gutsville with Frazer Irving and Silver Surfer: In Thy Name.

His other projects include more work for Marvel like Ghost Rider Annual #2, the one-shot "Wolverine: Dangerous Game," Danny Ketch: Ghost Rider mini-series with Javier Saltares, "Conqueror" a newuniversal one-shot, Punisher War Journal Annual #1, and X-Men Legacy vol.2, starring the character Legion. He also wrote a short story for Dark Horse Presents called "In Fetu."

In July 2019, it was announced that Spurrier would be writing DC's Hellblazer relaunch as part of The Sandman Universe line of comics. The relaunched series, written by Spurrier and illustrated by Aaron Campbell, begins after the events of the 1990 miniseries The Books of Magic. Hellblazer began with a one-shot on Halloween 2019, before becoming a regular series in November that same year. Due to the COVID-19 pandemic, the series was prematurely canceled after 12 issues. However, during New York Comic Con 2023, it was revealed that the series would getting a revival miniseries called John Constantine, Hellblazer: Dead in America, with Spurrier and Campbell returning and publication set to begin in January 2024.

In March 2023, it was announced that Spurrier would becoming the writer of The Flash when the book relaunches in September as a part of the Dawn of DC initiative. In April 2023, Spurrier was revealed to be writing Uncanny Spider-Man, as a part of Fall of X, and focuses on Nightcrawler donning a Spider-Man costume and defending New York City following the events of the 2023 Hellfire Gala.

== Bibliography ==
=== Comics ===
- Mega-City One:
  - "The Burning Red" (with PJ Holden, in Zarjaz vol. 1 #1, 2001)
  - "Catching the Rads" (with Darren Chandler, in Zarjaz vol. 1 #1, 2001)
- Tharg's Future Shocks:
  - "Old Red" (with Staz Johnson, in 2000 AD #1232, 2001)
  - "Given to Fly" (with Cam Smith, in 2000 AD #1257, 2001)
  - "Alpha Team" (with PJ Holden, in 2000 AD #1262)
  - "Sex Machine" (with Boo Cook, in 2000 AD #1264)
  - "Spare Parts" (with Richard Elson, in 2000 AD #1267)
  - "Hormones" (with Nigel Raynor, in 2000 AD #1279, 2002)
  - "Celestial Bodies" (with Shaun Bryan, in 2000 AD #1294, 2002)
  - "Tadfraggers" (with Gary Crutchley, in 2000 AD #1369, 2003)
  - "Hacked" (with Jon Davis-Hunt, in 2000 AD #1754, 2011)
- Tharg's Terror Tales: "Snacks of Doom" (with Neil Edwards, in 2000 AD #1282, 2002)
- Bec & Kawl (with Steve Roberts):
  - "and the Mystical Mentalist Menace!" (in 2000 AD #1290–1291, 2002)
  - "Beccy Miller's Diary" (in 2000 AD #1292–1293, 2002)
  - "Enlightenment" (in 2000 AD #1327, 2003)
  - "eeevil.com" (in 2000 AD #1328–1330, 2003)
  - "Pest Control" (in 2000 AD #1351–1354, 2003)
  - "Toothache" (in 2000 AD #1383–1386, 2004)
  - "Hell To Pay" (in 2000 AD #1401–1404, 2004)
  - "Attack of the Cones" (in 2000 AD #1437–1440, 2005)
  - "Freakshow" (in 2000 AD #1477–1481, 2006)
- The Scrap (with Richard Elson, in 2000 AD #1308–1312, 2002)
- Past Imperfect:
  - "Red Man Rising" (with Ian Richardson, in 2000 AD #1314, 2002)
  - "Warts 'n all" (with David Roach, in 2000 AD #1317, 2002)
- Lobster Random (with Carl Critchlow):
  - "No Gain, No Pain" (in 2000 AD #1342–1349, 2003 ISBN 1-904265-63-4)
  - "Tooth and Claw" (in 2000 AD #1411–1419, 2004)
  - "The Agony & The Ecstasy" (in 2000 AD #1482–1490, 2006)
  - "The Forget-Me-Knot" (in 2000 AD #1601-1610, 2008)
- From Grace (with Frazer Irving, in 2000 AD #1357–1361, 2003)
- "Work Experience" (with Steve Roberts, in 2000 AD #1403–1407, 2003)
- PlagueBringer (with Frazer Irving, in Warhammer Monthly, #84–85, 2004)
- The Simping Detective (with Frazer Irving):
  - "Crystal Blue" (in Judge Dredd Megazine #221–223, 2004)
  - "Innocence: A Broad" (in Judge Dredd Megazine #224–226, 2004)
  - "Dorks of War" (in Judge Dredd Megazine #227, 2004)
  - "Playing Futsie" (in Judge Dredd Megazine #234–236, 2005)
  - "Fifteen" (in Judge Dredd Megazine #237, 2005)
  - "Petty Crimes" (in Judge Dredd Megazine #238–239, 2005)
  - "Jokers to the Right" (in 2000 AD #1804–1811, 2012)
  - "Trifecta" (in 2000 AD #1812, 2012)
- The Dark Judges: "Judge Fear's Big Day Out" (text story, with an illustration by Cam Smith, in Judge Dredd Megazine #224, 2004)
- Zancudo (with Cam Kennedy, in Judge Dredd Megazine #231–233, 2005)
- Daemonifuge: Heretic Saint (with co-writers: Gordon Rennie and Jim Campbell, Art: Kev Walker, Karl Richardson, Chris Quilliams and Tim Trevellion; Black Library, 2005 ISBN 1-84416-251-6)
- Judge Dredd:
  - "Cursed Earth Rules" (with John Ridgway, in Judge Dredd Megazine #236, 2005)
  - "In the Stomm" (with Boo Cook, in Judge Dredd Megazine #236, 2005)
  - "Dominoes" (with pencils by Lawrence Campbell and inks by Kris Justice, in 2000 AD #1482, 2006)
  - "Splashdown" (with pencils by Laurence Campbell and inks by Kris Justice, in Judge Dredd Megazine #245, 2006)
  - "Neoweirdies" (with Paul Marshall, in 2000 AD #1496–1498, 2006)
  - "Versus" (with Peter Doherty, in 2000 AD #1499, 2006)
  - "Gutshot" (with Anthony Williams/Rob Taylor, in 2000 AD #1708, October 2010)
  - "The Beast in the Bay" (with Patrick Goddard, in 2000 AD #1709, November 2010)
- Harry Kipling (with Boo Cook):
  - "Prologue" (in 2000 AD #1476, 2006)
  - "Mad Gods & Englishmen" (in 2000 AD #1481–1483, 2006)
  - "Whetting the Whistle" (in 2000AD #1492–1493, 2006)
  - "Something for Nothing" (in 2000AD #1497–1499, 2006)
  - "The Hitman and Hermoth" (in 2000AD #1509-ongoing, 2006)
- Beneath (with Frazer Irving, in The Telegraph Magazine 2006-02)
- London Falling (with Lee Garbett, in 2000 AD #1491–1495, 2006)
- Tales From the Black Museum: "Ruddler's Cuddlers" (with Graham Manley, in Judge Dredd Megazine #246, 2006)
- Chiaroscuro (with Smudge, in 2000 AD #1507–1517, 2006)
- The Angel Gang: "Before they wuz dead" (with Steve Roberts, in Judge Dredd Megazine #258-262, 2007)
- Gutsville (with Frazer Irving, Image, 2007, ongoing)
- Silver Surfer: In Thy Name (with Tan Eng Huat, 4-issue mini-series, Marvel Comics, November 2007)
- Ghost Rider:
  - Ghost Rider Annual #2 (with Mark Robinson, Marvel Comics, 2008)
  - Danny Ketch: Ghost Rider (with Javier Saltares, 5-issue mini-series, Marvel Comics, 2008)
- The Vort (as G. Powell, with D'Israeli, in 2000 AD #1589–1596, 2008)
- "Wolverine: Dangerous Game" (with Ben Oliver, one-shot, Marvel Comics, June 2008}
- newuniversal: "Conqueror" (with Eric Nguyen, one-shot, Marvel Comics, October 2008)
- Punisher War Journal Annual #1 (with Werther Dell’Edera, Marvel Comics, November 2008)
- "The One Who Got Away" (with Paul Davidson, in Dark X-Men: The Beginning #3, Marvel Comics, October 2009)
- "The Ghost of Asteroid M" (with Leonard Kirk, in Nation X #1, February 2010)
- "In Fetu" (with Christopher Mitten, in Dark Horse Presents, Dark Horse Comics, 2010)
- X-Men: Blind Science (with Paul Davidson/Francis Portela, one-shot, Marvel Comics, July 2010)
- X-Men: Curse of the Mutants – Smoke and Blood (with Gabriel Hernandez Walta, one-shot, Marvel Comics, November 2010)
- X-Men Legacy vol. 2 (with Tan Eng Huat #1–24, Marvel Comics, 2012–2014)
- Extermination (with Jeffrey Edwards and V Ken Marion, 8 issue TPB, Boom studios, 2013)
- Six-Gun Gorilla (with Jeff Stokely, 6 issue TPB, Boom studios, 2013)
- X-Men Legacy #300 (co-written with Mike Carey and Christos Gage, drawn by Tan Eng Huat, Steve Kurth and Rafa Sandoval, Marvel Comics, March 2014)
- X-Force vol.4 (with Rock-He Kim, #1-#15, Marvel Comics, February 2014)
- The Spire #1-8 (with Jeff Stokely, #1-#8, Boom Studios, July 2015)
- Cry Havoc #1-6 (with Ryan Kelly, Image Comics, January 2016)
- Godshaper #1-6 (with Jonas Goonface, #1-#6, Boom Studios, April 2017)
- Angelic #1-6 (with Caspar Wijngaard, Image Comics, September 2017)
- Star Wars: Doctor Aphra #14-#19 (with Kieron Gillen, Marvel Comics, November 2017)
- Star Wars: Doctor Aphra #20-#40, Annual #2 (Marvel Comics, May 2018)
- Coda (with Matías Bergara, Boom Studios, May 2018)
- The Dreaming (with Bilquis Evely, #1-20, DC Black Label, September 2018)
- John Constantine, Hellblazer (with Aaron Campbell and Matias Bergara, #1–12, DC Black Label, November 2019)
- King in Black: Black Knight One-Shot (with Jesús Saiz, Marvel, January 2021)
- Black Knight: Curse of the Ebony Blade (with Sergio Dávila, #1-5, Marvel, March-July 2021)
- Way of X #1-5 (with Bob Quinn, Marvel, April 2021)
- X-Men: The Onslaught Revelation One-Shot (with Bob Quinn, Marvel, September 2021)
- Death of Doctor Strange: X-Men/Black Knight One-Shot (with Bob Quinn, Marvel, January 2022)
- Step by Bloody Step #1-4 (with Matias Bergara, Image Comics, February 2022)
- Legion of X #1-10 (with Jan Bazaldua, Marvel, May 2022)
- Damn Them All #1-10 (with Charlie Adlard, Boom! Studios, October 2022)
- Sins of Sinister: Nightcrawlers #1-3 (Marvel, February 2023)
- X-Men: Before the Fall – Sons of X #1 (with Phil Noto, Marvel, May 2023)
- Coda Vol. 2 #1-5 (with Matias Bergara, Boom! Studios, September 2023)
- Uncanny Spider-Man #1-5 (with Lee Garbett, Marvel, September 2023)
- The Flash #1-ongoing (with Mike Deodato Jr., DC, September 2023)
- X-Men Blue: Origins #1 (with Marcus To and Wilton Santos, Marvel, November 2023)
- John Constantine, Hellblazer: Dead in America #1-11 (with Aaron Campbell, DC Black Label, January 2024)

=== Web comics ===
- With Javier Barreno & Fernando Melek (October 2011). Crossed: Wish You Were Here. Avatar Press.

=== Novels ===
Spurrier has written a number of Warhammer 40,000 and 2000 AD-related novels:

- Fire Warrior. Black Library. 2003. ISBN 1-84416-010-6.
- Strontium Dog: Prophet Margin. Black Flame. 2004. ISBN 1-84416-134-X.
- Lord of the Night. Black Library. 2005. ISBN 1-84416-157-9.
- Xenology. Black Library. 2006. ISBN 1-84416-282-6.
- The Afterblight Chronicles: The Culled. Abaddon Books. August 2006. ISBN 1-905437-01-3.

==== Crime novels ====
- Contract. Headline Book Publishing. October 2007. ISBN 978-0-7553-3590-9.
- A Serpent Uncoiled. Headline Book Publishing. August 2011. ISBN 978-0-7553-3592-3.

== Awards ==
- 2002: Nominated for the "Best New Talent" National Comics Award
- 2007: Nominated the "Favorite Newcomer Writer" Eagle Award
- 2020: Won the GLAAD Media Award for Outstanding Comic Book

== Bibliography ==
- Simon Spurrier at 2000 AD online
- Simon Spurrier at the Black Library
