= Thrud the Barbarian =

Comics character created by Carl Critchlow

- Thrud in a Frank Frazetta-inspired pose in Critchlow's painted style on the cover of issue 1 of the Thrud the Barbarian full-length comic.

Publication information
- Publisher: Games Workshop (1983–1988), Carl Critchlow (2002–2007)
- First appearance: Arken Sword (1981)
- Created by: Carl Critchlow

In-story information
- Species: Barbarian
- Team affiliations: None
- Abilities: Strength of a rhinoceros Speed of a jungle cat Intelligence of a garden snail

Thrud the Barbarian is a comics character created by British artist Carl Critchlow in 1981. Although Thrud himself is a parody of Conan the Barbarian, particularly as depicted in the Arnold Schwarzenegger films, inspiration for the character's adventures and adversaries has been drawn from several fantasy sources.

During the 1980s, a Thrud comic strip was a regular and popular feature in the roleplay and wargame magazine White Dwarf with Thrud's grotesque and comic antics forming a memorable part of the magazine's golden age. In 2002, continued interest in the character from role-playing enthusiasts and a desire to be free to experiment with a new artistic style prompted Critchlow to self-publish a series of award-winning full-length Thrud the Barbarian comics.

Since October 2002, Critchlow has continued to develop his new artistic style in several different 2000 AD stories, contributing to the success of Lobster Random in particular. While Critchlow's use of muted palettes has been criticised, his style has received praise for being highly recognisable and unique.

== Appearances ==
=== Initial publications ===
The character of Thrud was created by the then 18-year-old Critchlow in 1981 while he was at foundation art college. His graphic design tutor, Bryan Talbot, gave him the project of producing a comic strip. At the time, Critchlow was reading the Conan books by Robert E. Howard, and this inspired him to produce Thrud. The initial five-page strip was published in comics fanzine Arken Sword. When Critchlow moved on to art college in Liverpool, Thrud made a further appearance in the comic Dead 'Ard, which Critchlow co-authored with artist Euan Smith. Dead 'Ard also featured a strip titled The Black Currant, subsequently re-published in the 26th and final issue of the Warrior comic anthology. The Black Currant would later appear as one of Thrud's many enemies.

Thrud from his origin story in the Thrud the Barbarian Graffik Novel and illustrating Critchlow's early inked style

=== White Dwarf ===
On seeing an advertisement in White Dwarf magazine asking for cartoonists, Critchlow submitted some of his Thrud strips and was hired. Thrud the Barbarian became a monthly feature in White Dwarf between issue 45 in September 1983 and issue 105 in September 1988. During this time, the black-and-white single-page strip was voted "Most popular feature" for three consecutive years.

In 1987, a collection of Thrud strips was published in a Thrud the Barbarian Graffik Novel by Games Workshop. In addition to strips that had been printed in White Dwarf, this anthology included a re-drawn version of the original Arken Sword strip and an origin story for Thrud.

=== Full-length comic ===
Once the Thrud strip had run its course in White Dwarf, Critchlow worked on other comics including the Judge Dredd/Batman crossover story The Ultimate Riddle, first published in 1995. His work on this story was fully painted, and while considered impressive was also criticised as being forced, confused and muddy. Critchlow was developing a new style based on line-drawings with computer colouring, but having been pigeon-holed as a painter did not believe that he would be able to interest anyone in this very different style.

When attending gaming conventions, Critchlow found that he was often remembered for his work on Thrud and recognised that there was still an interest in the character. He therefore decided to create and self-publish a full-length Thrud the Barbarian comic as a way to get his new style noticed. A total of five Thrud the Barbarian comics were published:

Thrud in issue 1 of the Thrud the Barbarian full-length comic and illustrating Critchlow's developing computer-drawn style

1. Carborundum Capers – June 2002
2. Ice 'n' a Slice – January 2003
3. Lava Louts – June 2004
4. Thrud Rex! – June 2005
5. Bungle in the Jungle – January 2007

Critchlow found that, by organising distribution through comic shops and a devoted Thrud website, he was able to break even financially. His new style was also noticed and received positive comments.

The cover images for each of the first four comics were hand-painted in contrast to the computer-coloured line art used in the comic itself. For issue 5, Critchlow also used his new style for the cover image.

== Fictional character biography ==
An origin story for Thrud was printed in the Thrud the Barbarian Graffik Novel. The story tells of a group of mercenaries who, lost and searching for a pub, stumble across an abandoned baby in a deserted village. The mercenaries decide to raise the baby as one of their own, teaching him how to fight and drink beer.

At the age of five, Thrud is sent to Crom the Destroyer Orthodox Pagan Infants School, where he towers above the teachers and his fellow students. When one of the children shoots him with a pea shooter, Thrud's reaction is to kill and maim twenty-seven pupils and three teachers, leading to his expulsion from the school. Choosing to return to the wilderness rather than his adoptive parents, Thrud lives alone until, one day, he stumbles across a hidden burial chamber. Finding a small helmet and a large axe, Thrud arms himself. Finding gold and gems, he decides to return to civilisation with his newfound wealth, quickly establishing himself a reputation as a violent warrior.

Many years later, Thrud the Barbarian becomes Thrud the King, but finds the mundane duties of kingship tiresome without opportunities to fight. To put a halt to Thrud's constant mutterings of, "Kill! Death! Maim! Mutilate! Destroy!", the wise men of his kingdom collect stories of heroism from around the land and read them to him long into the night.

== Characterisation ==
Endowed with the strength of a rhinoceros, the speed and agility of a jungle cat and the intelligence of a garden snail, Thrud is a one-dimensional character who engages in mindless slaughter and strikes Frank Frazetta-style poses while remaining ignorant of plot points. Depicted as an 8-foot-tall (2.4 m) barbarian with a hugely exaggerated, muscular physique and a very small head, and dressed in large furry boots and a loincloth, Thrud is a caricature of Arnold Schwarzenegger's Conan the Barbarian.

Thrud is also a heavy drinker, frequenting The Hobbit's Armpit tavern and regularly causing mayhem when he is unable to have his desired flavour of crisps. These and other annoyances often cause Thrud to invoke the author of the Conan the Barbarian books with the battle cry, "By the sacred jockstrap of Robert E. Howard you'll pay for this, Hellspawn!"

== Supporting characters ==
=== The Black Currant ===
First appearing in Dead 'Ard and Warrior, The Black Currant returned in a series of White Dwarf Thrud strips titled Thrud the Destroyer. In this story, The Black Currant is the leader of a horde of warriors who attack a small village, looting the homes, burning the women, raping the livestock and eating the babies. The Black Currant returned again in issue 3 of Critchlow's self-published Thrud the Barbarian comic as the leader of a group of bandits laying siege to a small town. The Black Currant is depicted in heavy black armour, wearing a helmet provided with a pair of exceedingly long, horizontally extending horns.

=== Carl Critchlow ===
Critchlow himself appears in a number of Thrud strips, occasionally as a narrator although more often as a drinking companion for Thrud. Critchlow depicts himself with lank hair and a large cap pulled down low over his eyes.

Croneman the Cimpletan posing in the Thrud the Destroyer story. Croneman is depicted as resembling Arnold Schwarzenegger, a common satirical target in the Thrud strips and comics

=== Croneman the Cimpletan ===
Croneman claims to be the mightiest barbarian of the northern tribes and honorary chief of the savage bezerkers of Nid. Known also as Amoron, the Wombat, he is a slayer, a reaver, a corsair, a usurper, and a conqueror. Depicted as resembling Schwarzenegger, he is also a bodybuilder with a very silly accent. On first meeting Croneman, Thrud slices him in half with a sword. When Croneman returns to join a group of mercenaries fighting The Black Currant in Thrud the Destroyer, he is depicted with a line of sutures running down the middle of his face and chest.

=== Lymara, the She Wildebeeste ===
Thrud first encounters Lymara when he sees her chasing away a wasp by waving a small cloth from her tower bedroom. Thinking her to be a damsel in distress, Thrud storms the tower, killing Lymara's father, five brothers, two uncles, ten cousins and fiance in the process. Seeking revenge, Lymara attempts to poison Thrud with a bottle of Acme "Mammoth Poison", but succeeds only in putting him to sleep as part of The Three Tasks of Thrud series of strips. Subsequently, Lymara joins Thrud as one of the group of mercenaries brought in to fight The Black Currant in Thrud the Destroyer. In this latter series of strips, Lymara is depicted with oversized breasts barely covered by an off-the-shoulder leather bra.

=== To-Me Ku-Pa ===
To-Me Ku-Pa (a name phonetically similar to that of British comedian Tommy Cooper) is an evil necromancer who regularly crosses paths with Thrud and is depicted as a bald man wearing a large cloak. Thrud first encounters To-Me Ku-Pa in an early White Dwarf strip and is turned into a frog. Subsequently, in The Three Tasks of Thrud, To-Me Ku-Pa takes advantage of Thrud's drugged state, following Lymara's failed assassination attempt, to hypnotise him and force him to obtain three items necessary for a spell.

In Thrud the Destroyer, To-Me Ku-Pa is revealed as being in service to The Black Currant and is providing him with an army of warriors drawn from throughout time, including daleks and Imperial stormtroopers. To-Me Ku-Pa also appears as the villain in issue 1 of the full-length Thrud the Barbarian comic.

== Merchandise ==
Collection of Thrud miniatures released by Citadel Miniatures

A range of Thrud merchandise has been produced since the character's inception, including a Thrud T-shirt and badge as well as a series of miniatures. Citadel Miniatures produced five different metal miniatures of Thrud, starting in 1984 with a "White Dwarf Personality" miniature. Three numbered limited edition miniatures followed consisting of "LE12, Thrud the Barbarian", in 1986, "LE19, Thrud and Female Admirer" in 1987, and "LE104, Thrud scratching head". Thrud was also introduced as a Blood Bowl player and Jervis Johnson commissioned an appropriate miniature. Heresy Miniatures has also produced three Thrud miniatures, including a limited edition "Strolling Thrud" that sold out within three weeks of release. On 29 March 2007, another limited edition of 1000 resin miniatures was released.

== Reception and awards ==
Thrud the Barbarian was one of the best loved pieces in White Dwarf over the five years that the strip ran, being voted "Most popular feature" for three consecutive years during the magazine's golden age. Long-term fans of Thrud were excited and nostalgic to see him return in his own full-length comic, but were concerned that the idea would not stretch to 24 pages. In reviewing issue 1, Jez Higgins, writing on TRS2, and Robert Clark of Strike to Stun, considered the comic a success that was more than one joke spread thin and which was not limited by the single page brevity of the original strip. Steven Maxwell of Bulletproof Comics, however, found that what worked well within the constraints of a single page seemed stretched when spun out over 24. Issue 2 received similarly mixed reviews, with Clark criticising the comic for being much the same, with the same themes and joke as issue 1 while Glenn Carter of Comics Bulletin found it to be well written light reading with quite a few elements of humour. Overall, the comic was deemed a success, with even the more negative reviewers awarding it 6 out of 10 and looking forward to more issues.

Although the writing received mixed reviews, the reception of the artwork was almost entirely positive. Higgins, recalling the heavy blacks and bold outlines of the original strip, found Critchlow's new style to be much more open and expressive. Maxwell also praised Critchlow's development as an artist, judging the comic to be beautifully drawn and coloured with a clear line style. Carter thought that the art was a little flat in places, but nevertheless praised it for being unique with a lot of character.

Critchlow was also commended for the risky decision to write, draw and publish the comic himself. The comic was compared favourably with professional quality comics, with its lack of adverts viewed as an advantage over those offerings. The high production values were also praised, with the glossy cover and high quality paper used for the inner pages.

In 2004, Thrud the Barbarian won the Eagle Award for "Favourite British Small Press Title". In 2006 Thrud was nominated for the "Favourite Colour Comicbook – British" Eagle Award, but lost out to 2000 AD.

== Legacy ==
In October 2002, four months after Thrud issue 1 was published, Critchlow returned to 2000AD using his new computer-drawn style. His first story was the Judge Dredd, Out of the Undercity story written by John Wagner. The new style was initially well received by 2000AD Review and seen as a marked improvement over his previous fully painted style with clearer figures and atmospheric colouring. As the Undercity story developed, however, Critchlow was criticised for using too narrow a palette, with too many greys and blues, although this might have been as a result of the story being set underground.

2000AD Review's criticism of Critchlow's subdued colouring continued with the 2003 Lobster Random story, No Gain, No Pain. By the conclusion, however, Critchlow's style was recognised as being truly unique and even the previously criticised blues and greys were seen to work well when used with other coloured elements. The artwork in two further Lobster Random stories, Tooth & Claw in October 2004 and The Agony & the Ecstasy in April 2006 was again very well received. Tooth & Claw was praised for its character designs while Critchlow's style in The Agony & the Ecstasy was said to be easily recognisable, having "volume, colour and verve".

== Bibliography ==
- Critchlow, Carl (1987). "Thrud the Barbarian Graffik Novel" (Document). Games Workshop. Stock Code 00776_{2}.
- Critchlow, Carl (June 2002). "Thrud the Barbarian Issue 1". Carl Critchley Audaciously Presents Thrud the Barbarian. Carl Critchlow. ISSN 1477-7096.
- Critchlow, Carl (June 2004). "Thrud the Barbarian Issue 3". Carl Critchley Audaciously Presents Thrud the Barbarian. Carl Critchlow. ISSN 1477-7096.
- Critchlow, Carl (January 2007). "Thrud the Barbarian Issue 5". Carl Critchley Audaciously Presents Thrud the Barbarian. Carl Critchlow. ISSN 1477-7096.
