= Carl Critchlow =

British fantasy and science fiction illustrator

- Areas: Artist, writer
- Notable works: Thrud the Barbarian · Lobster Random · Judge Dredd

Carl Critchlow is a British fantasy and science fiction comic illustrator. He is best known for his character Thrud the Barbarian, which originally appeared in White Dwarf magazine, and for his work for the Lobster Random comics.

== Career ==
Critchlow's comic book career began in the early 1980s, when he contributed to fanzines and informal publications. His professional career began in 1983 when his work was published in Issue 45 of Games Workshop's White Dwarf magazine, where Critchlow first portrayed his fantasy barbarian character, Thrud the Barbarian, in a regular, page-long, black and white, ink-drawn strip of the same name. Thrud was published for over fours years until issue 106; the strip was voted 'most popular feature' for three years running in readers' polls. Thrud the Barbarian often reflected current Games Workshop product lines and borrowed themes from games like Judge Dredd, Blood Bowl and Warhammer 40,000 and Thrud's native fantasy theme. To celebrate the character's status as a popular feature of the publication, Citadel produced a number of metal miniatures of Thrud. Shannon Appelcline referred Critchlow's "Thrud the Barbarian" as one of the comics "for which White Dwarf is probably best known". Critchlow also provided numerous black and white interior illustrations for Games Workshop's Dark Future game, and was featured in an Illuminations exposè in White Dwarf issue 103.

In 1984, Critchlow had his debut in mainstream comic books when he contributed The Black Currant strip for Warrior issue 26. In the 1990s, after the Thrud strip had concluded in White Dwarf, Critchlow began working with 2000AD, and he contributed artwork for Pat Mills' Nemesis & Deadlock strip. Critchlow contributed art for numerous strips in 2000AD, including Tharg's Future Shocks, Judge Dredd, Mean Machine: Son of Mean Machine, Tales of Telguuth, Flesh, and full colour work for the 1995 crossover Judge Dredd/Batman:The Ultimate Riddle.

Critchlow further contributed to the gaming world in 2000, and his work appeared in Dungeons & Dragons third edition books Monster Manual, Monsters of Faerûn, Magic of Faerûn, Lords of Darkness, Tome of Magic and Fiendish Codex I: Hordes of the Abyss. He has also provided illustrations for the Wheel of Time Roleplaying Game and the Star Wars supplements Secrets of Tatooine, Ultimate Alien Anthology and Star Wars Hero's Guide and almost two hundred illustrations for the Magic: The Gathering card game. He also contributed to JLA: Riddle of the Beast, a DC Comics graphic novel by Alan Grant.

In 2000, Critchlow withdrew from mainstream comics; he wrote and drew the Thrud the Barbarian strip for its own comic. The series proved popular with the comic reading public and won the Diamond 2004 Award for Best Small Press title. During this time he also worked as a lecturer and numerous new comics artists, such as Barry Renshaw, credited him for helping and inspiring them. In October 2002, four months after the first issue of Thrud was published, Critchlow started drawing for 2000AD again. His first work was the Judge Dredd story Out of the Undercity written by John Wagner, followed by the introduction of new comic Lobster Random in 2003 with No Gain, No Pain, written by Simon Spurrier. This was followed by Tooth & Claw in 2004 and The Agony & the Ecstasy in 2006. His current work includes ongoing artwork for Lobster Random and artwork for Judge Dredd scripts by Gordon Rennie.

== Style and reception ==
Critchlow's early work, including the entire Thrud the Barbarian series in White Dwarf, consisted entirely of black and white ink drawings. The Thrud character originated at art college, where Critchlow was studying under comic artist Bryan Talbot.Critchlow was presented with a comic strip project for the course, and began to develop Thrud. Critchlow was inspired by Robert E. Howard's Conan stories, which he was reading at the time. In an exposè published in White Dwarf towards the end of Thrud's tenure, art editor John Blanche wrote that Critchlow's "unique, chunky comic book technique provides the perfect vehicle for the biffoesque barbarian."

In the 1990s Critchlow began to use colour; his work on the 1995 Batman/Judge Dredd: The Ultimate Riddle was fully painted. At the time, while considered impressive his painting work was also considered forced, confused and muddy. Critic Joseph Szadkowski wrote that Critchlow's 1996 work "Sherlock Joker Strikes Out" shows his "commitment to presenting the Joker in an expressionist style, almost [Ernst Ludwig] Kirchner in a good mood." Critchlow continued to develop his colour work and new stylistic direction as he abandoned paint and began to combine traditional line drawings with computer colouring. However, having been pigeon-holed as a painter he did not believe he could interest anyone in this radically different approach. This new combination of techniques was used in 2000AD for the Judge Dredd story Out of the Undercity and was initially well received and seen as a marked improvement over his previous fully painted style, with clearer figures and atmospheric computer colouring. As the Undercity story developed, however, Critchlow was criticised for using too narrow a palette, with too many greys and blues, although this may have been a result of the story's underground setting. By the end of the series, views on Critchlow's artwork were mixed, although some readers wanted to see him working on a story set above ground and in daylight.

Criticism of Critchlow's subdued colouring style continued with his work on the Lobster Random debut in 2003, but as appreciation for the story grew, the two-toned colouring and scratchy line style were viewed by some as well-suited to the character. In one instalment, in which the protagonist is drugged, Critchlow introduced more colour into the strip, used sumptuous Day-Glo colours and experimented with unconventional panel layouts, moves that were well received. By the conclusion, Critchlow's style was recognised as unique, and even the previously criticised blues and greys were viewed as working well with other coloured elements.

In 2004, Critchlow's work on the Judge Dredd story, Cincinnati was praised for showing further stylistic improvements and introducing more colour than had previously been used. Critchlow's work on two further Lobster Random stories in 2004 and 2006 was very well received. Tooth & Claw was praised for its character designs and use of colour, and The Agony & the Ecstasy was considered immediately recognisable with its "volume, colour and verve".

Critchlow named Frank Frazetta as his principle formative influences, and he was inspired by seeing the work of Bryan Talbot's Luthor Arkwright series first hand. His other favourite artists from the comic book genre include Mike McMahon, Mike Mignola, Duncan Fegredo, Jamie Hewlett, Simon Davis, Nicolas de Crecy and Masamune Shirow.

== Bibliography ==
Thrud the Barbarian, as he appeared in the publication of the same name, and featuring Critchlow's use of line and colour combining traditional and digital techniques.

=== Comics ===
- The Black Currant (in Warrior issue 26, 1984)
- Thrud the Barbarian:
  - Thrud the Barbarian (in White Dwarf magazine issues 45, 1983 to 106, 1988)
  - Carborundum Capers (in Thrud the Barbarian issue 1, 2002)
  - Ice 'n' a Slice (in Thrud the Barbarian issue 2, 2003)
  - Lava Louts (in Thrud the Barbarian issue 3, 2004)
  - Thrud Rex! (in Thrud the Barbarian issue 4, 2005)
- Nemesis & Deadlock (with Pat Mills):
  - Warlocks and Wizards (in 2000 AD issue 700, 1990)
  - Enigmass Variations (in 2000 AD issue 723–729, 1991)
- Tharg's Future Shocks: Blink of an Eye (with Mark Eyles, in 2000 AD issue 748, 1991)
- Flesh:
  - Legend of Shamana Book 1 (with Pat Mills/Tony Skinner, in 2000 AD issue 800–808, 1992)
  - Legend of Shamana Book 2 (with Pat Mills/Tony Skinner, in 2000 AD issue 817–825, 1993)
  - Flesh 3000AD (with David Bishop/Steve MacManus, in 2000 AD issue 1034, 1997)
- Judge Dredd:
  - Happy Birthday Judge Dredd (with Mark Millar, in 2000 AD issue 829, 1993)
  - Out of the Undercity (with John Wagner, in 2000 AD issue 1313–1316, 2002)
  - Cincinnati (with John Wagner, in 2000 AD issue 1371–1373, 2004)
  - The Searchers (with Gordon Rennie, in 2000 AD issue 1424, 2005)
  - Burned Out (with Gordon Rennie, in 2000 AD issue 1461 and Judge Dredd Megazine issue 238, 2005)
  - Mandroid: Instrument of War (with John Wagner, in 2000 AD issues 1555–1566, 2007)
  - Backlash (with John Wagner, in 2000 AD issues 1628–1633, 2009)
  - Under New Management (with John Wagner, in 2000 AD issue 1649, 2009)
  - Trifecta (with Al Ewing, Simon Spurrier and Rob Williams, in 2000 AD issue 1812, 2012)
- Mean Machine: Son of Mean Machine (with John Wagner, in Judge Dredd Megazine issue 2.63–2.72, 1994–1995)
- Batman/Judge Dredd: The Ultimate Riddle (with John Wagner/Alan Grant, 1995)
- Lobo #13, 27-28, 31-33, 35-36, 38-40, 43-45, 47, 49-50, 53-54, Annual #3 (with Alan Grant, 1995-1998)
- Batman: Masterpieces (1998)
- Batman/Scarecrow 3-D (with John Francis Moore, 1998)
- Tales of Telguuth (with Steve Moore):
  - Uhuros the Horrendous (in 2000 AD issue 1198, 2000)
  - The Caverns of Garnek-Spay (in 2000 AD issue 1240–1242, 2001)
- JLA: Riddle of the Beast (with Alan Grant, 2002)
- Lobster Random (with Simon Spurrier):
  - No Gain, No Pain (in 2000 AD issue 1342–1349, 2003 ISBN 1-904265-63-4)
  - Tooth and Claw (in 2000 AD issue 1411–1419, 2004)
  - The Agony & The Ecstasy (in 2000 AD issue 1482–1490, 2006)
  - The Forget-Me-Knot (in 2000 AD issue 1600-, 2008)

=== Role-playing games ===
- Conan: Adventures in an Age Undreamed Of (2016, Modiphius Entertainment, inner pages illustrations by Carl Critchlow, among others)
