= The Spire (comics) =

- Cover of The Spire #1, showing Shå

Publication information
- Publisher: Boom! Studios
- Format: Limited series
- Genre: Fantasy, mystery
- No. of issues: 8

Creative team
- Written by: Simon Spurrier
- Artist: Jeff Stokely
- Letterer: Steve Wands
- Colorist: André May

The Spire is an American weird fantasy / mystery comics series written by Simon Spurrier and drawn by Jeff Stokely. The eight-issue limited series has been published since 2015 by Boom! Studios. The series was nominated for an Eisner Award in 2016 for “Best Limited Series”.

It is set in the titular Spire, a vast city in the middle of a deadly wasteland, locked in war with religious zealots and riven by the tension between its rulers and the underclass of "Sculpted", humans who have been hybridized with nonhuman biology. The protagonist is Shå, the city's captain of police, who investigates a series of murders of aristocrats at a time when a new Baroness is crowned and the city's internal and external conflicts are about to come to a head.

Spurrier described the recipe for the series as "one part 'Mad Max,' one part 'Bladerunner,' one part 'Dark Crystal,' one part nutfuck insanity". Paste Magazine characterized the "beguiling" comic as inspired by China Miéville's Bas-Lag and Jeff VanderMeer's Ambergris in creating a world where "the fantastical aspects don’t mitigate the worst aspects of human nature".
