= Kidnapped (comics) =

2007 graphic novel by Alan Grant

Kidnapped, a 2007 graphic novel by Alan Grant (words) and Cam Kennedy (artwork), is adapted from Robert Louis Stevenson's 1886 novel Kidnapped. It was commissioned as part of the events to celebrate Edinburgh being named the first UNESCO City of Literature.

The National Library of Scotland acquired some of the original artworks from the project for its permanent collections. Additionally, pieces were featured in Edinburgh Evening News. 7500 free copies of it were printed.

Grant claims to have read the original novel six times to familiarise himself fully with the source material, and decided to use as much of the original dialogue as possible.

It has also been translated into Lowland Scots, as Kidnappit by Matthew Fitt, and James Robertson, and it has been translated into Scots Gaelic as Fo Bhruid by Iain MacDhòmhnaill.
