= Cam Kennedy =

Scottish comics artist

- Born: Campbell Kennedy; October 15, 1944 (age 82)
- Areas: Penciler, Inker
- Notable works: Judge Dredd; Rogue Trooper; The Light and Darkness War; Star Wars: Dark Empire

Campbell "Cam" Kennedy is a Scottish comics artist. He is best known for his work on 2000 AD, especially the flagship titles Judge Dredd and Rogue Trooper.

== Biography ==
Following work in commercial art in his hometown of Glasgow, Kennedy went freelance and worked as an illustrator on D.C. Thomson's Commando, a British war comic, between 1967 and 1972, before leaving comics altogether to become a professional fine artist. Kennedy's work has been described as gritty, energetic, chunky and raw.

In 1978 he was lured back to comics work again, beginning by drawing the Fighting Mann (1980-81) strip for Fleetway Publications' Battle comic. As Battle began to wind down, Kennedy moved across to its stablemate, the weekly science fiction anthology 2000 AD

Kennedy was instrumental in several strips that continue to this day, including The V.C.s (written by Gerry Finley-Day, Judge Dredd (with John Wagner and Alan Grant, including the "Midnight Surfer" story which reintroduced Chopper) and Rogue Trooper (again with Finley-Day). His association with the comic, which is largely produced by fellow Scotsmen, has never faltered: in 2005, Kennedy designed and produced a brand new strip, Zancudo, written by Simon Spurrier for the Judge Dredd Megazine, and Wagner has written three stories about character Kenny Who?, an alter-ego for Kennedy, based on his early problems getting work at American companies (as well as making jokes on issues like creator's rights and censorship).

In America, Kennedy established a working relationship with writer Tom Veitch, producing the creator-owned Vietnam War-inspired science fantasy miniseries The Light and Darkness War for Marvel Comics' Epic imprint. This led to the pair working on a Star Wars spin-off, Dark Empire, for Dark Horse Comics. Kennedy has worked on other Star Wars licensed comics, including Boba Fett stories with writer John Wagner. For DC Comics Kennedy has worked on Lobo, Batman, Outcasts and The Spectre. For Marvel, he has illustrated the Punisher, Daredevil and Nick Fury, Agent of S.H.I.E.L.D.

As part of the UNESCO City of Literature in 2007 he has drawn Kidnapped, an adaptation of Robert Louis Stevenson's Kidnapped, written by Alan Grant, published by Waverley Books. Some of the art for this has been bought for the collections of the National Library of Scotland.

A follow-up has been made by the same creative team, it is an adaptation of Jekyll and Hyde and was as part of the One Book – One Edinburgh 2008 campaign.

== Bibliography ==
=== 2000 AD / Judge Dredd Megazine / Warrior ===
- The V.C.s (in 2000 AD # 142–143, 146–147, 150–153, 156–160, 163–164 & 169, 1979–80)
- Rogue Trooper (in 2000 AD # 265, 278–281, 290–301, 303–310, 316–322 & 327–332, 1982–83)
- Ektryn (in Warrior # 14, 1983)
- Judge Dredd (in 2000 AD # 342, 1983)
- Rogue Trooper (in 2000 AD # 343–347, 350–355, 358–364, 366–377 & 381–392, 1983–84)
- Ektryn (in Warrior # 25, 1984)
- Rogue Trooper (in 2000 AD # 401–406, 1985)
- Judge Dredd (in 2000 AD # 416–418 & 424–429, 1985)
- Rogue Trooper (in 1986 2000 AD Annual, 1985)
- Judge Dredd (in 2000 AD # 435, 437 & 440–41, 1985)
- Judge Dredd (in 2000 AD # 451–455, 458, 461–463, 466–467 & 477–479, 1986)
- Judge Dredd (in 2000 AD # 507–510, 514 & 520, 1987)
- Judge Dredd: Beyond Our Kenny (in Judge Dredd Megazine vol.1 # 1–3, 1990)
- Judge Dredd (in Judge Dredd Megazine vol.3 # 46 & 50, 1998–99)
- Zancudo (with Simon Spurrier, in Judge Dredd Megazine #231–233, 2005)

=== Dark Horse ===
- Star Wars:
  - Dark Empire (with Tom Veitch):
    - Dark Empire (six-issue mini-series, 1991–1992, trade paperback, 1993, ISBN 1-56971-073-2)
    - Dark Empire II (six-issue mini-series, 1994, trade paperback, 1995, ISBN 1-56971-119-4)
  - Boba Fett:
    - Death, Lies, & Treachery (with John Wagner, Dark Horse Comics, 1998, ISBN 1-56971-311-1) collects:
      - "Bounty on Bar-Kooda" (one-shot, 1995)
      - "When the Fat Lady Swings" (one-shot, 1996)
      - "Murder Most Foul" (one-shot, 1997)
    - "Agent of Doom" (with John Ostrander, one-shot, 2000)
  - "Sacrifice" (with John Wagner, in Empire No. 7, 2003, collected in Boba Fett: Man With A Mission, Dark Horse, March 2007, ISBN 1-59307-707-6)

=== DC Comics ===
- Outcasts (with John Wagner/Alan Grant, 1987)
- The Spectre #7–8: "Armed against Evil" (with Doug Moench, 1987)
- Batman #477–478: "A Gotham Tale" (with John Wagner, 1992)
- Lobo: "Unamerican Gladiators" (with Alan Grant/John Wagner, 4-issue mini-series, 1993)
- Batman/Judge Dredd: Vendetta in Gotham (with John Wagner/Alan Grant DC / Fleetway, 1993)
- War Story: "The Reivers" (with Garth Ennis, Vertigo, standalone one shot, 2003, collected in War Stories: Volume 2, 2006 ISBN 1-4012-1039-2)

=== Marvel Comics ===
- The Light and Darkness War (with Tom Veitch, 1988)
- Nick Fury, Agent of S.H.I.E.L.D. # 11: "Greeting from Scotland" (1990)
- Daredevil #Annual 6 (1990)
- Punisher: "Blood on the Moors" (with John Wagner/Alan Grant, 1991)
- Punisher: Streets of Laredo (with Garth Ennis, Punisher # 28–31, tpb, Volume 5, 168 pages, 2003, ISBN 0-7851-1096-8)
