= Kipling (crater) =

Crater on Mercury

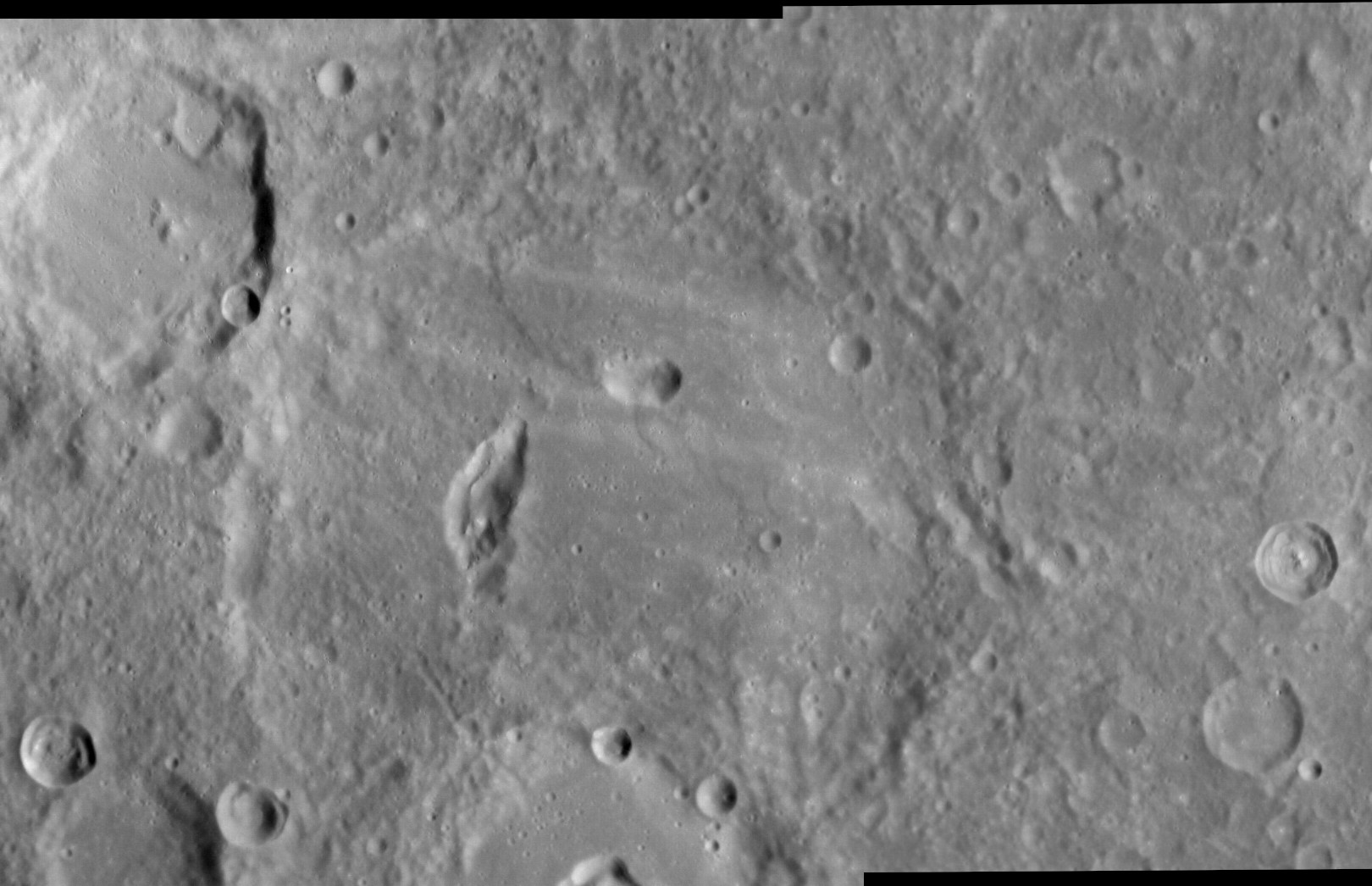
- MESSENGER NAC mosaic of Kipling
- Feature type: Impact crater
- Location: Eminescu quadrangle, Mercury
- Coordinates: 19.37°S 287.98°W
- Diameter: 164 km (102 mi)
- Eponym: Rudyard Kipling

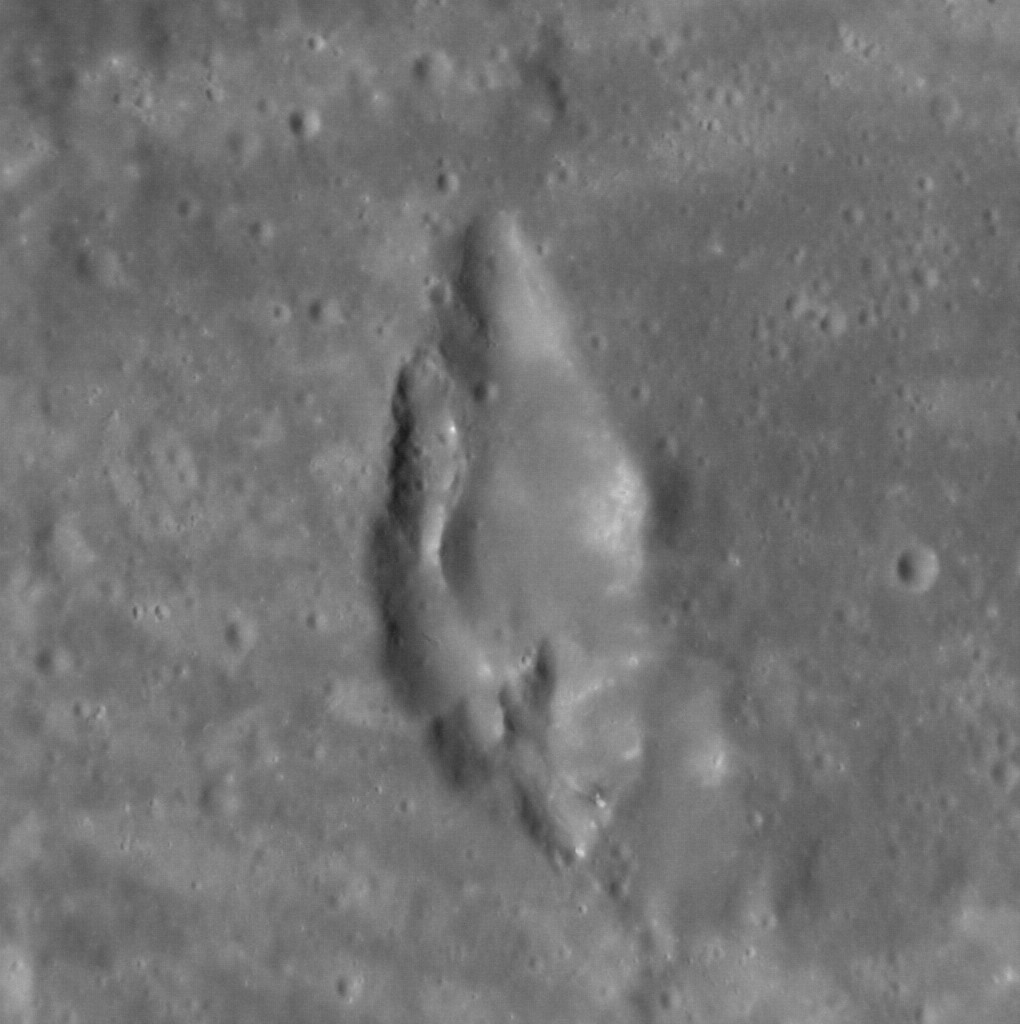
The larger of the two irregular depressions within Kipling crater

Kipling is a crater on Mercury. It has a diameter of 164 kilometers. Its name was adopted by the International Astronomical Union (IAU) in 2010. Kipling is named for the British author Rudyard Kipling, who lived from 1865 to 1936.

There is a large, irregular depression within Kipling that is probably a volcanic pit. It was likely caused by multiple eruptions and it is called a compound vent. The pit is also a confirmed dark spot.

Kipling is north of the smaller Capote crater. To the northwest of Kipling is the small but prominent crater David, which is also a dark spot.

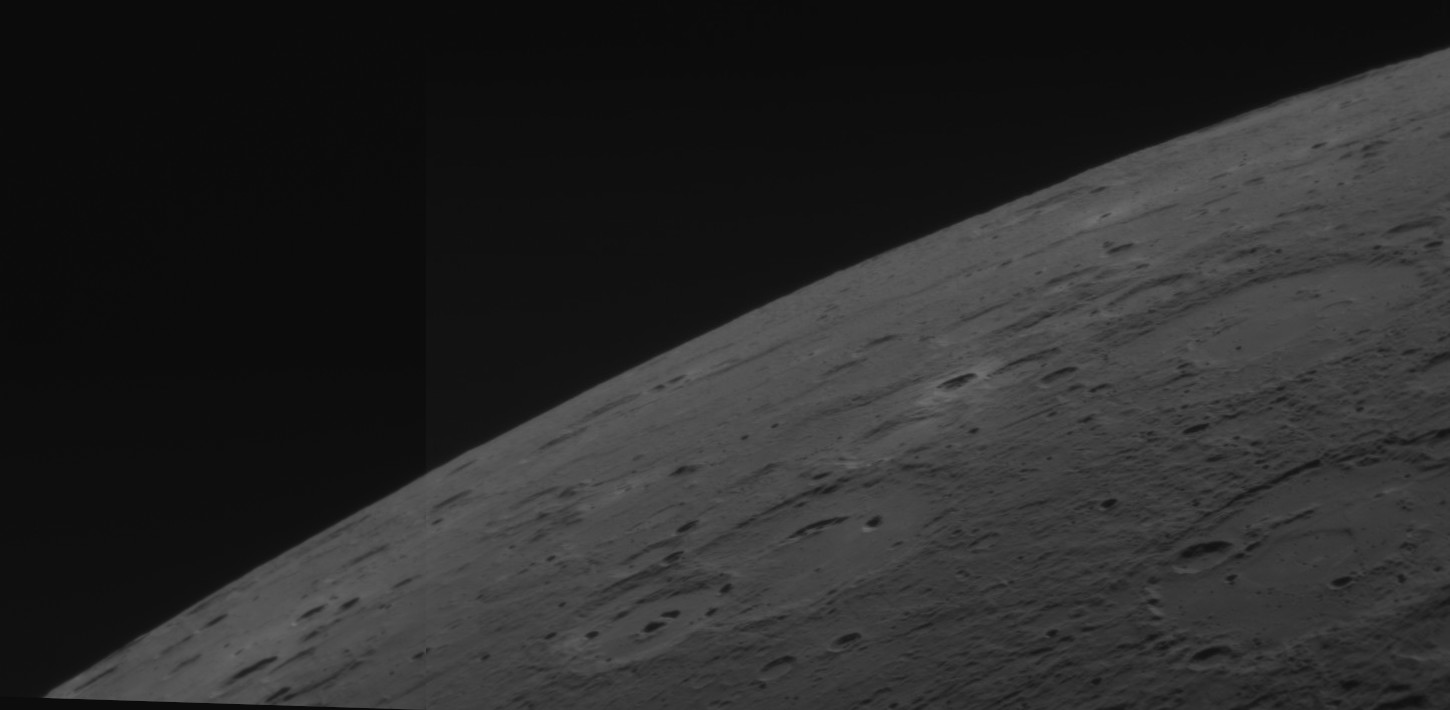
Oblique view from MESSENGER's second flyby in October 2008. Kipling is in central foreground.
