= Harry Kipling =

Harry Kipling is a comics character appearing in the British weekly anthology 2000 AD, created by Simon Spurrier and Boo Cook. He is a True Brit, trying to survive in a world of rampant Pantheistic solipsism aided only by strong tea and a big gun.

== Plot ==
The story takes place in an alternate steampunk version of the British Empire (Neo-Britannia). The Empire has collapsed and every supernatural being has somehow been physically manifested. The various deities and sprites pass their time eating their subjects, squabbling and fighting amongst themselves in hopes of achieving monotheism.

They are fought by a single relic of the NeoBritannia Empire, Harry Kipling. A parody of a traditional Imperial man, he wears a solar topee, uses an elephant gun and drinks earl-grey tea. He lives as a zombie, dedicating his undead existence to the complete eradication of gods - "Proactive Atheism".

In this he's aided by Neesha, a bewildered refugee from a war-torn planet, and Klux, a powerful but unintelligent engine of destruction. Kipling discovered he is the pawn of an unnamed god who is presumably more powerful than those he's seen before and probably the one who brought him back. He promised allowed he would take down this god too which an unknown figure was heard mockingly saying he could try.

== Appearances ==
So far he has only appeared in his own eponymous series, formed by the following episodes:

- "Prologue" (in 2000 AD #1476, 2006)
- "Mad Gods & Englishmen" (in 2000 AD #1481-1483, 2006)
- "Whetting the Whistle" (in 2000 AD #1492-1493, 2006)
- "Something for Nothing" (in 2000 AD #1497-1499, 2006)
- "The Hitman and Hermoth" (in 2000 AD #1509-1512, 2006)
- "Winter Wonderbrand" (in 2000 AD Prog 2007, 2007)

== Gods ==
- The Family - Appears in #1476
- Sobek the crocodile god - Appears in #1481-1483
- Spider Queen of Teotihuacan - Appears in #1492-1493
- Ama-Tsu-Mara - Appears in #1492-1493
- Ornumila the Wise - Appears in #1497-1499
- The Anti-God/Atheist Commander - Appears in #1497-1499
- Bellin-Bellin - Appears in #1509 - 1512
- Hermoth - Appears in #1509 - 1512
- Christmas Gods - Appears in #2007

== See also ==
- List of steampunk works
