= The Light and Darkness War =

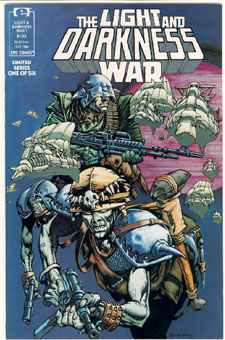
- Original cover of issue one of The Light and Darkness War.

Publication information
- Publisher: Marvel Comics
- Format: Limited series
- Genre: Portal fantasy; Science fantasy; War
- Publication date: October 1988 – September 1989
- No. of issues: 6

Creative team
- Created by: Tom Veitch; Cam Kennedy
- Written by: Tom Veitch
- Artist(s): Cam Kennedy
- Letterer(s): Gaspar Saladino
- Colorist(s): Cam Kennedy
- Editor(s): Archie Goodwin

The Light and Darkness War is a limited series, six-issue science fantasy comic book written by Tom Veitch and illustrated by Cam Kennedy. It was published by Epic Comics, an imprint of American company Marvel Comics.

Titan Books released a collected hardcover edition of the series in May 2015 (ISBN 978-1-7827-6180-8). In addition to the six complete issues of the original comics, the book contains a foreword by retired United States Navy Commander and helicopter pilot Mike Beidler; a background briefing by Tom Veitch; an essay by Stephen R. Bissette; and extensive sketch and development art by Cam Kennedy.

== Plot synopsis ==
Lazarus Jones, a disabled Vietnam War veteran who lost his legs in combat during a helicopter explosion that killed four of his brothers-in-arms, suffers post-traumatic stress disorder and descends into alcohol and drug abuse. Years later, living a life bordering on despair, he wishes he had died with his friends.

After an emotional visit to the Vietnam Veterans Memorial Wall with his wife Chris, he suffers a car accident that puts him in a coma, during which he is transported to another dimension where his friends are alive, serving as warriors in a never-ending battle against Lord Na and the forces of Outer Darkness.
