= Boo Cook =

British comic artist

- Born: 1972 (age 53–54)
- Area: Artist
- Notable works: 2000AD

Boo Cook (born 1972) is a British comic artist, whose work mainly features in the comic 2000 AD.

== Career ==
Boo Cook mostly works as an artist for British comic 2000AD on characters such as Judge Dredd, Anderson Psi, Death Cap, Void Runners, Blunt, Harry Kipling, ABC Warriors and Asylum. Boo has also worked on various Image comics including Elephantmen and Prophet, Doctor Who for Titan comics and has provided covers for Marvel Comics Wolverine and X Factor. He's provided art for several album covers including Henge's 'Journey To Voltus B' and various other artists. He is also a painter and a musician in solo project Owlmask and plays drums with bands Forktail and Crab, all of which can be found on Bandcamp.

== Bibliography ==
=== Comics ===
- Tharg's Future Shocks:
  - "Home from the War" (with Steve Moore, in 2000 AD #1208, 2000)
  - "Earth Works" (with Dan Abnett, in 2000 AD #1233, 2001)
  - "Sex Machine" (with Simon Spurrier, in 2000 AD #1264, 2001)
  - "Skin Game" (with Steve Moore, in 2000 AD #1268, 2001)
  - "Goldie Locke & the Three B.E.A.R.s" (with Andrew Lewis, in 2000 AD #1288, 2002)
- ABC Warriors: "The Zero Option" (with Pat Mills, in 2000 AD #1243-1245, 2001)
- Asylum (with Rob Williams, tpb, April 2007, ISBN 1-904265-67-7):
  - "Asylum" (in 2000 AD #1313-1321, 2002)
  - "Asylum 2" (in 2000 AD #1406-1414, 2004)
- Dead Men Walking (with David Bishop as "James Stevens", in 2000 AD #1362-1370, 2003)
- Judge Dredd:
  - "Doppelganger" (with Ben Dickson, in Zarjaz (vol. 2) #1, 2005)
  - "Descent" (with Gordon Rennie, in 2000 AD #1432-1436, 2005)
  - "In the Stomm" (with Simon Spurrier, in Judge Dredd Megazine #236, 2005)
  - "The Listener" (with Gordon Rennie, in Judge Dredd Megazine #265, 2007)
  - "The Biographer" (with Rob Williams, in 2000 AD #1537, 2007)
  - "The Slow Walk" (with Rob Williams, in 2000 AD #1698, 2010)
- Harry Kipling (with Simon Spurrier):
  - "Prologue" (in 2000 AD #1476, 2006)
  - "Mad Gods & Englishmen" (in 2000 AD #1481-1483, 2006)
  - "Whetting the Whistle" (in 2000AD #1492-1493, 2006)
  - "Something for Nothing" (in 2000AD #1497-1499, 2006)
  - "The Hitman and Hermoth" (in 2000AD #1509-ongoing, 2006)
- "Team Titanic!" (with Al Ewing, in The End Is Nigh #3, 2006)
- Anderson: Psi Division (with Alan Grant):
  - "Wiierd" (in Judge Dredd Megazine #272-276, 2008)
  - "Biophyle" (in Judge Dredd Megazine #277-278, 2008)
  - "The House of Vyle" (in Judge Dredd Megazine #300-304, 2010)
- Damnation Station (with Al Ewing):
  - "The Feelings That You Lack" (in 2000 AD #1681, 2010)
  - "The Sun Always Shines" (in 2000 AD #1682-1684, 2010)
- Doctor Who (with Al Ewing)
  - Whodunnit (in Doctor Who: The Eleventh Doctor #4, 2014)
  - The Sound of Our Voices (in Doctor Who: The Eleventh Doctor #5, 2014)

=== Covers ===
Cover work includes:

- 2000 AD #1342, 1365, 1368, 1411, 1413, 1422, 1436, 1454, 1471, 1492, 1500, 1509, 1532 and 1561 (2003-)
- The End Is Nigh #2
- 2000 AD Winter Special (2005)
- Judge Dredd Megazine #254 and 274 (2007)
- Elephantmen: War Toys #1-3 (2007–2008)
- X-Factor: The Quick and the Dead (July 2008)
- Wolverine: Dangerous Games (August 2008)
- X-Factor #33-37 (September 2008)
- X-Factor Special: Layla Miller (October 2008)

=== Other work ===
In 2010 Boo Cook provided the artwork for the debut album of British Alt Rock band The Longest Day
