= The Nightcomers (comics) =

British comic book story

- Beth (left) and Rick Rogan in a panel from "The Nightcomers" from the 9 June 1984 edition of Scream!; art by John Richardson.

Publication information
- Publisher: IPC Magazines
- Schedule: Weekly
- Title(s): Scream! 5 May to 30 June 1984
- Formats: Original material for the series has been published as a strip in the comics anthology(s) Scream!.
- Genre: Horror
- Publication date: 5 May – 30 June 1984
- Main character(s): Beth Rogan; Rick Rogan

Creative team
- Writer(s): Tom Tully
- Artist(s): John Richardson
- Editor(s): Ian Rimmer

Reprints
- Title(s): Judge Dredd Megazine #417 (supplement); 19 February 2020

"The Nightcomers" is a British science fiction strip character, appearing in titles published by IPC Magazines. The strip debuted in the weekly anthology Scream! on 5 May 1984, running until the comic was cancelled after the 30 June 1984 edition. The story was written by Tom Tully and drawn by John Richardson.

== Creation ==
Scream! had initially launched with a strip called "Terror of the Cats" written by Chris Lowder; however, management had severe concerns about the horrific content of Scream! in general and "Terror of the Cats" in particular. Tiring of constant demands to rewrite the story, Lowder quit and assistant editor Simon Furman was tasked with swiftly wrapping up the story. A replacement was commissioned at short notice from the experienced Tom Tully, a veteran who had written for the majority of IPC's boys titles over the previous 20 years - most notably "Roy of the Rovers".

== Publishing history ==
Scream! was still beset by nervous management despite the removal of "Terror of the Cats", and the title was cancelled at the end of June 1984. Group editor Barrie Tomlinson felt the impact of the 1984 National Union of Journalists strike - which brought IPC to a halt - and executives looking for an excuse to cancel the title were factors along with sales. "The Nightcomers" was not selected to be continued after the story was merged into Eagle; however, unlike "The Dracula File" and "Tales from the Grave", the story at least landed on the end of an arc. The episode featured in the 30 June 1984 issue promised 'A new Rogan thriller next week!'. A second story written by Furman had been completed and drawn when Scream! was cancelled but did not see print at the time, even though Scream! specials would be published until 1989. The unpublished episodes were published as part of Hibernia Books' It's Ghastly - The Untimely Demise of Scream! in 2016.

In 2016, the post-1970 IPC material owned by Egmont Publishing, including the complete run of Scream!, was purchased by Rebellion Developments.

Beth Rogan and Raven's Meet were both included as plot elements in Rebellion's crossover series The Vigilant. In 2020, the first arc of "The Nightcomers" story was reprinted by Rebellion and issued as a free supplement with Judge Dredd Megazine #417; the supplement also included a reprint of "Terror of the Cats".

== Plot summary ==
Ghost-hunters David and Anne Rogan are killed in a car crash, fleeing a malevolent entity while investigating a foreboding house called Raven's Meet; their telepathic children Beth and Rick immediately learn of their parents' deaths and meet up, heading to the family home. David and Anne carried out their work under the cover of a magic stage act; they find a cassette recording telling them of their real activities, and that they had been hired by the house's owner, Simon Cutler.

The pair resolve to continue to investigate Raven's Meet; as they approach they come under attack from a demonic beast. Beth hears her mother's voice in her head, telling her to use her Ankh amulet. She uses it to absorb the creature, and Beth realises she has inherited her parents' extrasensory perception. Rick is found by Cutler and his scarred servant Aldo, who knock him out. Beth meanwhile continues to come under psychological attack inside Raven's Meet. Cutler plans to burn the house down to end its threat to him, but Aldo is killed as he starts the blaze and a spirit arrives to torment him. Rick and Beth are able to bring the fire under control, and she has a vision of tremendous sadness from the home. Cutler meanwhile hits on the idea of sacrificing the pair to the spirit, and ties up Beth. Cutler explains he made a deal with the demon Baphomet, and accidentally killed his wife Edna during the ritual. He hopes killing Beth will appease Edna's spirit but Baphomet arrives and forces Cutler to stab himself. Rick is able to drive the demon off, and the pair escape Raven's Meet, resolving to further delve into its mysteries.
