= The Dwarf =

The Dwarf may refer to:

- The Dwarf (Lagerkvist novel), a 1944 novel by Pär Lagerkvist
- The Dwarf (Cho Se-hui novel), a 1978 novel by Cho Se-hui
- Der Zwerg (The Dwarf), an opera by Alexander von Zemlinsky
- The Man from Another Place from the Twin Peaks series by David Lynch
- The Dwarf (comics), a comic strip and character from the British comics anthology Jet
- "The Dwarf", a 1954 short story by Ray Bradbury
