= Terror of the Cats =

British comic book story

- The first page of "Terror of the Cats" as published in the 24 March 1984 edition of Scream!; art by José Gonzalez, script by Chris Lowder.

Publication information
- Publisher: IPC Magazines
- Schedule: Weekly
- Title(s): Scream! 24 March to 28 April 1984
- Formats: Original material for the series has been published as a strip in the comics anthology(s) Scream!.
- Genre: Horror
- Publication date: 24 March – 28 April 1984
- Main character(s): Allen Woodward; Doctor Ulrich Kruhl; Sir Ralph Spedding

Creative team
- Writer(s): Chris Lowder (Note: Credited as 'John Agee'.); Simon Furman
- Artist(s): José Gonzalez; John Richardson
- Editor(s): Ian Rimmer

Reprints
- Title(s): Judge Dredd Megazine #417 (supplement); 19 February 2020

"Terror of the Cats" is a British horror comic strip character, appearing in titles published by IPC Magazines. The strip was published in the weekly anthology Scream! from 24 March to 28 April 1984. The story was initially written by Chris Lowder before he quit, with Simon Furman taking over; it was Furman's first published comics work. José Gonzalez and John Richardson provided artwork. The story concerns housecats suddenly becoming hostile to humans.

== Creation ==
Sensing a gap in the market, senior editors Barrie Tomlinson and Gil Page began putting together the anthology title Scream! for IPC. Management were nervous; horror comics had been banned in the UK in Children and Young Persons (Harmful Publications) Act 1955, and the IPC board were wary of a repeat to the outcry received by Action in 1976. As such, Tomlinson and Page had to walk a fine line; Tomlinson would later describe his plans be to make Scream! "a bit frightening, without being a horror comic".

Lowder had 15 years of experience with IPC, having worked on the editorial team of Lion in the final days of the comic. His scripting work had included "Invasion!" and "Dan Dare" for 2000 AD, as well as "Hell's Highway" and the controversial "Kids Rule O.K." for Action. He maintains he warned Tomlinson that the strip would be "about cats clawing the faces off babies" and was given the all-clear, and threw himself into writing the story with some relish.

== Publishing history ==
"Terror of the Cats" featured in the debut issue of the new title. However, Scream! was beset with managerial interference from the start; Tomlinson recalled the first issue was "torn apart" by the board at a meeting, necessitating numerous rewrites, a pattern that would stay for the rest of the comic's short life. With four scripts completed, management demanded "Terror of the Cats" be brought to a quick end after just two had seen print after consistent criticism. Group editor Barrie Tomlinson put this down to him and Gil Page having to take the scripts to a member of executive management while Lowder ascribed the decision to editorial director John Sanders - who had been at the forefront of the Action controversy several years before. Lowder - already disillusioned at a planned Sexton Blake revival for Tornado had been changed to feature a new character called Victor Drago at the insistence of management - left comics writing as a result.

Instead Scream! assistant editor Simon Furman would be charged with taking over the story at short notice; he had already written a story for the comic's "Library of Death" anthology strip, but his hurriedly-written replacement scripts for "Terror of the Cats" would be his first published comics work. The story was ended after the sixth issue of Scream!, instead being replaced by "The Nightcomers". He would later recall struggling for how to make cats scary even after referring to Alfred Hitchcock's The Birds, reflecting "it was hard to really work up much enthusiasm for something I'd been brought in just to wrap up as quickly and cleanly as possible".

In 2016, the post-1970 IPC material owned by Egmont Publishing, including the contents of Scream!, was purchased by Rebellion Developments. In 2020, the complete "Terror of the Cats" story was reprinted by Rebellion and issued as a free supplement with Judge Dredd Megazine #417; the supplement also included a reprint of "The Nightcomers".

== Plot summary ==
In Barchester, six people are hospitalised after separate attacks by cats in the space of an hour. Barchester Evening Echo reporter Allen Woodward sets out to investigate, and finds research scientist Doctor Ulrich Kruhl under attack from felines. Woodward heads back to the hospital to question surgeon Sir Ralph Spedding over Kruhl's odd behaviour, but comes under attack himself. The hospital then comes under siege by an army of cats, targeting nurse Jim Wardon - who had helped Kruhl. Woodward meanwhile slips past the cats and heads to Kruhl's research lab, where he finds the scientist has created a huge brain capable of controlling all cats, which he plans to use as his own personal army. After a struggle, Woodward knocks Kruhl onto the brain and both are destroyed. The area's cats return to their usual selves, while Woodward is prevented from filing a report due to the government issuing a D-Notice.
