= Vampirella =

Fictional vampire character

- Vampirella by Joe Jusko

Publication information
- Publisher: List: Warren Publishing (1969–83); Harris Publications (1991–2010); Dynamite Entertainment (2010–present)
- First appearance: Vampirella #1 (September 1969)
- Created by: Forrest J Ackerman; Trina Robbins

In-story information
- Alter ego: Ella Normandy
- Species: Vampire
- Place of origin: Drakulon
- Abilities: List: Vampirism; Shapeshifting; Immortality; Superhuman healing and regeneration; Superhuman strength; Superhuman speed; Night vision; Flight; Hypnosis; Telepathy
Vampirella
- Vampirella #1 (September 1969). Cover art by Frank Frazetta
Publication information
- Schedule: Monthly
- Format: Ongoing series
- Genre: Horror, fantasy
- Publication date: List: (Warren) September 1969 – March 1983; (Harris – vol. 1) November 1997 – April 2000; (Harris – vol. 2) March 2001 – August 2003; (Dynamite – vol. 1) November 2010 – February 2014; (Dynamite – vol. 2) June 2014 – August 2015; (Dynamite – vol. 3) March–August 2016; (Dynamite – vol. 4) February 2017 – April 2018; (Dynamite – vol. 5) July 2019 -November 2021; (Dynamite – vol. 6) February 2024-March 2025; (Dynamite – vol. 7) March 2025-present
- No. of issues: List: (Warren): 112; (Harris – vol. 1): 26; (Harris – vol. 2): 22; (Dynamite – vol. 1): 38; (Dynamite – vol. 2): 13; (Dynamite – vol. 3): 6; (Dynamite – vol. 4): 11; (Dynamite – vol. 5): 25; (Dynamite – vol. 6): 9
Creative team
- Written by: List: (Warren) Archie Goodwin; (Harris – vol. 1) Kurt Busiek; (Harris – vol. 2) Mark Millar; (Dynamite – vol. 1) Eric Trautmann; (Dynamite – vol. 2) Nancy A. Collins; (Dynamite – vol. 3) Kate Leth; (Dynamite – vol. 4) Jeremy Whitley; (Dynamite – vol. 5) Christopher Priest; (Dynamite – vol. 6) Christopher Priest; (Dynamite – vol. 7) Christopher Priest
- Artist: List: (Warren) José González Gonzalo Mayo; (Harris – vol. 1) Louis Small; (Harris – vol. 2) Mike Mayhew; (Dynamite – vol. 1) Fabiano Neves; (Dynamite – vol. 2) Patrick Berkenkotter; (Dynamite – vol. 3) Eman Casallos; (Dynamite – vol. 4) Andy Belanger; (Dynamite – vol. 5) Ergun Gunduz; (Dynamite – vol. 6) Ergun Gunduz; (Dynamite – vol. 7) Ergun Gunduz

Vampirella (/væmpɪˈrɛlə/) is a vampire superheroine created by Forrest J Ackerman and comic book artist Trina Robbins in Warren Publishing's black-and-white horror comics magazine Vampirella #1 (Sept. 1969), a sister publication of Creepy and Eerie.

Writer-editor Archie Goodwin later developed the character from horror-story hostess, in which capacity she remained through issue #8 (Nov. 1970), to a horror-drama leading character. The magazine was published continuously until 1983, when Warren Publishing ceased operations and its assets were bought by Harris Publications. Vampirella comics, both new and reprints, have continued through various publishers into the 21st century.

== Publication history ==
=== Warren Publishing ===
Vampirella initially appeared in Warren Publishing's black-and-white horror-comics magazine Vampirella #1 (Sept. 1969), running to issue #112 (March 1983), plus a 1972 annual reprinting stories from the series, and a 1977 special with color reprints of José González stories. The title was a sister magazine of Warren's horror anthologies Creepy and Eerie. Like those magazines' respective mascots, Uncle Creepy and Cousin Eerie, Vampirella hosted horror stories, though unlike them, she would also star in her own story, which would headline each issue. Vampirella was initially edited by Bill Parente. It was later edited by Archie Goodwin (issues #7–12, 34–35), Billy Graham (#13–16), Bill DuBay (#21–50, 87–95, 101–102) and Louise Jones (#51–86).

According to comics historian Richard J. Arndt, "Forrest Ackerman created, or at least had a strong hand in creating, Vampirella and he clearly had a major influence in shaping the lighthearted bad-girl story style of this issue as well." Her costume and hair style were designed by comics artist Trina Robbins. The character's first story artist was Tom Sutton. Artist Frank Frazetta's first-issue cover was a substitute for the original cover by European artist Aslan.

José González became the character's primary artist starting with issue #12. Other artists who drew Vampirella during her magazine's original run included Gonzalo Mayo, Leopold Sanchez, Esteban Maroto, José Ortiz, Escolano, Rudy Nebres, Ramon Torrents, Pablo Marcos, Jimmy Janes, John Lakey, Val Lakey, and Louis Small Jr.

Backup features appearing in Vampirella included "Tomb of the Gods", "Pantha", and "Fleur". Vampirella herself appeared in a story with fellow Warren characters Pantha and the Rook in Eerie #94–95, and with most of the Warren characters in a company crossover special in Eerie #130.

=== Harris Publications ===
Upon Warren's bankruptcy shortly afterward, Harris Publications acquired the company assets at auction in August 1983, although legal murkiness and a 1999 lawsuit by Warren publisher James Warren resulted in his reacquisition of the rights to sister publications Creepy and Eerie. Harris Comics published Vampirella stories in various series and miniseries from 1991 to 2007, beginning with Vampirella #113 (1988), a one-issue continuation of the original series, containing Vampirella reprints and one unrelated new story. Harris subsequently published the all-reprint one-shot Vampirella vs. the Cult of Chaos, and the four-issue miniseries Vampirella: Morning in America (Sept. 1991 - April 1992) by writer Kurt Busiek and penciler Louis La Chance. Three ongoing series followed:

- Vampirella #1–5, followed by #0 (Nov. 1992 – Dec. 1994), primarily by plotter Busiek, scriptwriter Tom Sniegoski, and penciler Louis Small Jr.;
- Vengeance of Vampirella #1–25 (April 1994 – April 1996) by writer Sniegoski and artist Aldrin Aw (under the pseudonym Buzz), and later pencilers including Kirk Van Wormer, Kevin Sharpe, David Perrin, Chris Batista, and Amanda Conner.
- Vampirella Strikes #1–7 (Oct. 1995 – Oct. 1996) by writers Sniegoski, David Quinn, Mark Millar, and Ian Edginton, and pencilers including Ed McGuinness, Karl Moline, and Rudy Nebres.

The three-issue miniseries Vampirella Lives (Dec. 1996 – Feb. 1997) featured writer Warren Ellis and penciler Conner.

Additionally, Harris published several one-shots: Vampirella Summer Nights (title per its trademarked cover logo) / Vampirella's Summer Nights (as in the indicia's copyright information) (1992), by writer Steve Englehart and penciler Joe Brozowski (under the pseudonym J. J. Birch), Vampirella/Shadowhawk: Creatures of the Night (Feb. 1995), Vampirella Pin-Up Special (Oct. 1995), and Vengeance of Vampirella: The Mystery Walk (Nov. 1995).

Harris also published many reprints. The 1993 trade-paperback collection Vampirella: The Dracula War reprinted a serialized story from Harris' Vampirella #1–4. The 1994 Cain / Vampirella Flip Book reprinted a 1993 Vampirella story by writer Busiek and artist Arthur Adams from Harris' Creepy 1993 Fearbook. The five-issue Vampirella Classic (Feb.–Nov. 1995) reprinted Warren stories. Vengeance of Vampirella: Bloodshed (March 1995) reprinted a serialized story from the Vengeance of Vampirella series.

The publisher additionally reprinted Warren stories in the trade paperback Vampirella: Transcending Time & Space (1992), Vampirella: A Scarlet Thirst (1993), and Vampirella & The Blood Red Queen of Hearts (1996); and the series Vampirella of Drakulon #1–5, followed by #0 (Jan.–Nov. 1996).

At the Fangoria Weekend of Horrors convention in January 2007, Scott Licina, editor-in-chief of Fangoria Comics, announced his company had acquired the character from Harris. However, on April 30, 2007, Harris editor Bon Alimagno denied there had been such an arrangement in place and that Fangoria's claim was "not factual". Harris subsequently launched the title Vampirella Quarterly.

=== Dynamite Entertainment ===
On March 17, 2010, Dynamite Entertainment acquired the rights to Vampirella from Harris Comics. The publisher started a new ongoing series with Vampirella #1, in November 2010. A new monthly series, Vampirella and the Scarlet Legion, was released in May 2011 following the main title. The series lasted 38 issues before concluding in January 2014.

The title was rebooted in June 2014 with Vampirella vol. 2, #1 by author Nancy Collins. A third volume debuted in March 2016, which was noted for giving Vampirella a new costume.

A fourth monthly series, Vampirella vol. 4, debuted in 2017. The series was initially written by Paul Cornell, and later by Jeremy Whitley.

A fifth monthly series, written by Christopher Priest and Ergun Gündüz, began publication in July 2019 in celebration of the character's 50th anniversary. The run lasted 25 issues long and ended with Vampirella's marriage to Dracula. That same year, Dynamite debuted Vengeance of Vampirella, which had been the name of a Harris-era comic, and hired the original writer of that series, Thomas Sniegoski, to write a continuation of the original series for the character's 50th anniversary.The series would get sequels Vampirella Strike, Vampirella Armageddon and Vampirella Paradise. The series follows after the death vampirella in the original Vengeance of Vampirella she is broguht back to final bring an end to Nyx's reign and the aftermath of her killing Nyx

In 2020 Dynamite published several other series and one-shots fearing Vampirella, including Die!namite (2020), Vampirella vs Purgatori. In 2021 it published Vampiverse and Vampirella/Dracula: Unholy!

A sixth monthly Vampirella series launched in February 2024.

In 2022 Dyanmite published the spinoff The Vamp, Vampirella: Mindwarp, Vampirella vs. Superpowers, and Vampirella: Year One.

In celebration of the character's 55th anniversary, Dynamite announced it would renumber the book starting with issue 666, counting runs and one shots throughout Vampirella's history, with the first new story arc, "Beyond", written by Christopher Priest, who has been writing Vampirella since 2019 and is the longest writer in the character's history This brought Volume 5 to an end with 25 issues and the sixth relaunch started with legacy numbering 666 the legacy renumbering ending with issue 675.

A seventh relaunch debuted in March 2025, with a new issue #1 (legacy number 676). In April 2026, an eighth volume of the monthly Vampirella series, written by Christopher Priest with art by Davis Goettenm, debuted with a new issue #1. The storyline would explore themes of race, politics, gender, and humanity through both the titular main character, who would experience a loss of her powers and a resurgence of her bloodthirst, and Draculina. The debut issue was designated with the legacy number of #688, with Dynamite planning for the milestone issue #700.

=== Mike The Pike Productions ===
On March 2, 2021, Mike The Pike Productions, Inc.'s subsidiary Arowana Media Holdings, Inc. acquired the worldwide film, television and streaming rights to Dynamite Entertainment's Vampirella. Including stories, characters, and derivative works of the Vampirella universe.

== Fictional character biography ==
Vampirella originally hails from the planet Drakulon, a world where blood flows like water and where the natives, called the Vampiri, share traditionally vampiric characteristics. Drakulon orbits a binary star which causes continuous droughts throughout the year. These droughts gradually dry up the Vampiri's blood supply; threatening them with extinction. Vampirella's journey begins when an American space shuttle crashes on Drakulon. Hoping to save her people, she travels to Earth and begins hunting dark remnants of her own race. Earth's vampires originate from Dracula, a forgotten member of the Vampiri race who left his homeworld centuries ago only to be corrupted by the demonic entity known as Chaos.

=== Harris continuity ===
After relaunching Vampirella with the miniseries Morning In America, written by Kurt Busiek, Harris Comics published the story "Mystery Walk", which revised Vampirella's origin. She learns she is, in fact, the daughter of Lilith, whom popular medieval lore depicts as the first wife of Adam. Lilith would not submit to Adam and, cast out of Eden by God, spawned demons. She later repented and went to Eden to bear children to fight the evil she had created. Her first attempt was Madek and Magdalene, who turned to evil; Vampirella was her second. Madek and Magdalene brainwashed her into believing she was from Drakulon.

Further retcons were presented in Vampirella Lives and in Blood Lust. Drakulon is real, but is a place in Hell. Vampirella was brought to Eden, not born there. It was Lilith, not Madek and Magdalene, who made believe Drakulon was another planet. Vampirella restores the rivers of blood to Drakulon, which weakens Lilith, who is killed by the hand of God.

A further revision in the "World's End" storyline revealed Lilith did not really repent and raised Vampirella to be good because she wanted to release the Heart of Darkness (heart of the fallen angel Malkuth) from Metatron's lance, which could only be done by a good person. Another retcon, in Vampirella: Revelations, reveals the reason Lilith raised Vampirella to be good was that the existence of vampires made Lilith weaker and she wanted someone to kill them. Lilith used a magic mirror to make Vampirella believe whatever variation on her origin was necessary at the time.

=== Dynamite continuities ===
In the initial Dynamite-published series, Vampirella works reluctantly with Dracula against a rebellious cult of his former followers. Acquiring Sofia Murray as her sidekick, Vampirella becomes involved in a plot by the Vatican that ultimately resurrects Von Kreist and leads to Sofia's death. Vampirella severs her ties with the Vatican and finds herself working for the forces of Order again. Reuniting with a resurrected Van Helsing, Pendragon, and other characters from the Warren Magazine run, Vampirella visits the future and discovers the world destroyed by the supernatural. Trying to form a supernatural kingdom to contradict this, Vampirella falls prey to a conspiracy by Dracula and a group of vampire knights that results in reality becoming unraveled. Lilith banishes Vampirella from her universe in order to save her.

Vampirella was relaunched with Our Lady Of Shadows as an agent of the Vatican before being relaunched again with a new costume in Hollywood Horror under author Kate Leth. In this universe, Vampirella has recently come to Earth and become a Hollywood scream queen. She lives with her boyfriend Tristan and butler Coleridge.

After falling into a thousand-year sleep, Vampirella awakes in a bizarre, dystopian future, where she meets her new sidekick and girlfriend, Vicki, and a black cat she names Grit. After going on a journey through her own mind, Vampirella learns she has absorbed all the memories and experiences of a hundred Vampirellas from parallel universes.

According to the Hack/Slash series, Vampirella currently works as a radio talk show host and has several times teamed up with Cassie and her partner Vlad to stop demons and vampires instead of the standard slashers the series is known for. She and Vlad have an intense physical attraction and relationship, but broke up because his nomadic lifestyle did not mesh with hers.

In the 2019 version by Christopher Priest, the writer incorporated all the previous versions of the character's history to make a comprehensive revision of Vampirella's back story. Vampirella has been on Earth for 50 years, and she has strained relationships with Lilith, Draculina, Victory (her one time girlfriend), and Chasity. After Vampirella married Dracula, she had his child.

=== Powers and abilities ===
Vampirella possesses many of the typical powers of mythological vampires. She exerts super-strength when facing her opponents and can move so fast that she appears as a blur of motion. Her senses are far beyond those of humans, allowing her to tell one's emotional state through their scent, hear things imperceptible to humans, and see clearly in total darkness. She has increased athletic abilities and possesses stamina, reflexes, and agility beyond that of humans. Her healing factor grants her resilience, allows her to heal rapidly from her wounds, and makes her immune to Earthly illness and toxins. Feeding quickly restores her strength and health.

She has the power to grow a giant pair of chiropteran wings to allow self-propelled flight. She can make her stare and even her voice hypnotic. She has been seen as having the ability to induce sexual arousal in males simply by being in their presence. She is shown to have the power of telepathy as she was able to hear the voices of demons inside Jackie Estacado's mind.

She is immortal. In addition to her supernatural abilities, Vampirella is a formidable hand-to-hand combatant and is shown to be skilled with modern-day firearms.

== Spinoffs ==
Christopher Priest's world of Vampirella has been expanded in spinoffs. The first is Sacred Six (2020), which follows Lilith, Vampirella's mother, protecting a vampire city with a team consisting of Nyx, Chastity, Pantha, Victory (who takes on the name Draculina), and Katie (the real Draculina). Solo series were published for Nyx (2021), Pantha (2022), Draculina (2022), and Victory (2023).

== Characters ==
=== Main protagonists ===
- Vampirella

The heroine is a vampire and the daughter of Lilith. She needs blood to survive and has many typical vampiric powers, including superhuman physical abilities, shapeshifting into a bat, immortality, and a mesmeric stare. She is not prone to the race's traditional weaknesses, such as daylight, holy water, garlic, or crosses. She does not attack people to drink their blood, except occasionally when she herself is attacked or desires to kill. Generally she tries to drink the blood of criminals and not the innocent.

- Pendragon

A former sorcerer, now a sideshow magician. Vampirella calls him "Pendy dearest" and treats him as she would a kindly old uncle. While occasionally his knowledge of magic is useful to her, Pendragon is often a liability. In the Warren stories they often travel together, seeking out evil-doers, but Pendragon is generally depicted as getting lost, getting drunk, falling asleep, or otherwise fumbling at a critical moment, thus causing a crisis. Vampirella is deeply loyal to him, however; he is the only real family she has.

- Conrad van Helsing

A blind, psychic vampire hunter. He was pursuing Dracula and initially tried to destroy Vampirella, believing her to be kin to that vampire lord.

- Adam van Helsing

Conrad's son, and the last of a long line of vampire hunters, he followed his father's steps and became a paranormal researcher. He is portrayed as more open-minded than his father. He believed Vampirella was not evil, and eventually they fell in love. Vampirella has often helped Adam in his research.

=== Other characters ===
- Tyler Westron

A physician who rescued Vampirella after a plane crash. Due to the injuries she sustained, he had to amputate her wings and was able to create a substitute blood serum that keeps Vampirella's thirst under control.

- Dracula

Dracula appears as the most frequently recurring villain of the series.

- The Blood-Red Queen of Hearts

Formerly known as Jezebel, or the Whore of Babylon, she was once a beautiful woman of ancient Babylon. She served as high priestess of the mad-god Chaos, until she offended her master by demanding that he make her his queen. As punishment, Chaos destroyed her body and trapped her soul within a Queen of Hearts playing card. Though she no longer has a physical form of her own, she has continued to exist for thousands of years as the card. Whenever a woman touches the card, she becomes the Queen.

- Madek and Magdalene

Evil brother and sister of Vampirella, who planted false memories of the planet Drakulon in Vampirella's mind, in one version of her origin.

- Draculina

Vampirella's blonde twin sister, who first appeared in Vampirella #2 (1969). She would make sporadic appearances in Harris publications, such as in Vampirella Quarterly Summer 2008. She began appearing in Dynamite stories in 2015. In the 2019 run there was introduced of an alternate version called Katherine (also Katie or Vampirette), switching places using a cursed candle.

- Nuberus

The demon who tempted Vampirella with her true origin in order to gain access to Earth.

- Sofia Murray

A young punk girl rescued by Vampirella who becomes her sidekick in the first Dynamite series.

- Von Kreist

A former Prussian World War I officer, now a lich, who won his state of immortality in a card game with Satan, but at the price of steadily decaying alive. A cruel and sadistic mastermind, with a special victim preference in children.

- Chaos

The ruler of Hell and the master of most of the villains that Vampirella faces.

- Mistress Nyx

The daughter of a liaison between the mad-god Chaos and Lucrezia Borgia. A demonic persona, who is bent on destroying Vampirella.

- Dixie Fattoni

One of two daughters of a Mafioso boss whom she was forced to kill by von Kreist; her twin sister Pixie was turned into a vampire by von Kreist's minions. Vampirella took the orphaned girl under her wing and trained her in combating vampires.

- Pantha

Initially, alien shapeshifter from Vampirella's native planet who can morph into a black panther. Later stories rewrote her origin to that of an ancient Egyptian Pharaoh that was cursed by the Egyptian gods because of a murderous spree . She is cursed to live forever, with periods where she does not know who or what she is.

- Lilith

Vampirella's mother and the first woman created by God. Her story is told in the alternate version of the events of Genesis, she was the first wife of Adam, and the mother of demons. She sent her daughter to Earth to atone for her mistakes. In Priest's run, she no longer is the first woman but a woman from the planet Drakulon.

- Tristan

Vampirella's boyfriend on Drakulon in the Warren series who was killed by astronauts from Earth. In the 2010 Dynamite series, he is Vampirella's boyfriend and a werewolf.

- Victory

Victoria Harris ("Victory") debuted in the 2019 Dynamite Priest era of Vampirella; her name is taken from when Drauclina used the name Victory as an alias during the Harris Era.

- Hemorrhage

A wielder of Bloodmagic and lover of Nyx.

- Mamba

A snake goddess and enemy of Pantha

- Lukas Van Helsing

The future son of Vampirella and Adam van Hellsing.

- Drago

Vampirella's half brother who became Vampirella's ally after falling in love with a human woman.

- Coleridge

Vampirella's butler.

- Dixie Fattoni

The daughter of a crime boss who befriends Vampirella.

- Lorelei

A young vampire from the planet Drakulon.

- Professor Quatermass

A time traveler seeking to conquer history.

- Dervish

A member of the Danse Macabra organization.

- Metifa

The villain from the one shot story "Prelude to Shadows" and the bride of Satan.

- Cicero

Vampirella and Dracula's son.

== Reception ==
Vampirella was ranked 35th in Comics Buyer's Guide's "100 Sexiest Women in Comics" list.

== Circulation figures ==
Data is derived from annual Statements of Circulation. "Copies printed" refers to total print run. "Total paid circulation" refers to number of copies actually sold, which is the above number minus returns, lost/damaged copies, and free/promotional copies.

=== Vampirella (Warren) ===
Statement date / Published in	Average, copies printed	Average, total paid circulation	Percent of run returned / Sell-through at retail
Oct. 1, 1974 / #42 (May 1974)	170,850	95,735	22.2% / 56.0%
Oct. 1, 1975 / #49 (March 1975)	175,150	97,530	20.0% / 55.7%
Oct. 1, 1976 / #58 (March 1976)	162,740	90,725	20.0% / 55.7%
Nov. 30, 1977 / #67 (March 1977)	165,400	92,125	20.0% / 55.7%
Sept. 30, 1978 / #76 (March 1978)	166,395	92,550	20.0% / 55.6%
Sept. 30, 1979 / #85 (March 1979)	161,745	90,050	20.0% / 55.7%
Sept. 30, 1980 / #94 (March 1980)	137,345	76,468	20.0% / 55.7%
Sept. 28, 1981 / #104 (April 1981)	129,311	71,923	20.0% / 55.6%
Oct. 1, 1982 / #112 (March 1982)	123,592	68,728	43.2% / 55.6%

== Comics Bibliography ==
=== Warren Publishing ===
Title	Issues	Publication date	Collection edition
Ongoing series
Vampirella	#1–112	September 1969 – March 1983	Vampirella Archives 1–15

=== Harris Publications ===
Title		Issues	Publication date	Notes
Ongoing series
Vampirella	vol. 1	#113	1988	Magazine is reprints of earlier Vampirella stories
Vampirella	vol. 2	#0–5	November 1992 – December 1994	
Vengeance of Vampirella		#0–25	June 1994 – April 1996	
Vampirella Monthly		#0–26	November 1997 – April 2000	
Vampirella	vol. 3	#1–22	August 2001 – August 2003	
Vampirella Comics Magazine		#1–10	October 2003 – April 2005	
Vampirella Quarterly		#1–7	March 2007–September 2008	
Limited series
Vampirella: Morning in America		#1–4	September 1991 – April 1992	
Chains of Chaos		#1-3	November 1994 – January 1995	
Vampirella Strikes		#1–7	October 1995 – October 1996	
Vampirella of Drakulon		#1–5	January–September 1996	
Vampirella: Death and Destruction		#1–3	July–September 1996	
Vampirella Lives		#1–3	December 1996 – February 1997	
Vampirella: Blood Lust		#1–2	July–August 1997	
Vampirella: Revelations		#1–3	July 2005 – February 2006	
One-shots
Vampirella: Summer Nights			August 1992	
Vampirella: Sad Wings of Destiny			September 1996	
Queens of Halloween		#1	October 1996	
The Death of Vampirella			February 1997	
Vampirella Manga 2999			December 1998	
Hell on Earth Battlebook: Streets of Fire		#1	January 1999	
Vampirella Manga 3000			July 1999	
Vampirella: Vampology			September 2003	
Vampirella: Halloween Trick or Treat			October 2004	
Vampirella: Halloween Special		#1	October 2006	
Crossovers
The Magdalena/Vampirella	vol. 1	#1	October 1993	Co-published with Image Comics through Top Cow Productions.
Vampirella/Shadowhawk: Creatures of the Night		#1–2	February–March 1995	
Catwoman/Vampirella: The Furies		#1	February 1997	Co-published with DC Comics.
Vampirella vs Pantha		#1	March 1997	
Vampirella vs Hemorrhage		#1–3	April–June 1997	
Vampirella/Wetworks		#1	June 1997	Co-published with Image Comics; followed by the similarly titled Wetworks/Vampirella #1 (July 1997).
Vampirella/Shi			September 1997	Co-published with Crusade Comics; followed by the similarly titled Shi/Vampirella (October 1997).
Vampirella/Dracula: The Centennial			October 1997	Written by Alan Moore
Vampirella/Painkiller Jane			May 1998	
Vampirella/Lady Death		#1	February 1999	Co-published with Chaos! Comics.
Lady Death vs. Vampirella		#1	March 1999	Co-published with Chaos! Comics.
Lady Death vs. Vampirella II		#1	March 2000	Co-published with Chaos! Comics.
Purgatori vs. Vampirella		#1	April 2000	Co-published with Chaos! Comics.
Vampirella/Witchblade			July 2003	Co-published with Top Cow Productions.
Witchblade/The Magdalena/Vampirella		#1	January 2004	Co-published with Top Cow Productions and Dynamic Forces.
Vampirella/Witchblade: Union of the Damned		#1	October 2004	Co-published with Top Cow Productions.
The Magdalena/Vampirella	vol. 2	#1	October 1993	Co-published with Image Comics through Top Cow Productions.
Vampirella/Witchblade: The Feast		#1	October 2005	Co-published with Top Cow Productions.
The Darkness/Vampirella		#1	July 2005	Co-published with Top Cow Productions.
Tomb Raider/Witchblade/Magdalena/Vampirella		#1	August 2005	Co-published with Image Comics through Top Cow Productions.
Sword of Dracula/Vampirella		#1	January 2008	Co-published with Digital Webbing.

=== Dynamite Entertainment ===
==== Ongoing ====
Title		Publication date	Issues	WRITER	ARTIST	Collection editions
Ongoing series
Vampirella	Vol. 1	November 2010 – February 2014	#1–38, Annual 1–2	Eric Trautmann, Brandon Jerwa	Wagner Reis, Fabiano Neves, WalterGeovani Heubert Khan-Michael, Malaga, Patrick Berkenkotter	Vol. 1: Crown of Worms Vol. 2: A Murder of Crows Vol. 3: Throne of Skulls Vol. 4: Inquisition Vol. 5: Mothers, Sons, and a Holy Ghost Vol. 6: The Final Curtain Vampirella: Bites
Vampirella	Vol. 2	June 2014 – June 2015	#1–13	Nancy A. Collins	Patrick Berkenkotter, Cristhian Zamora	Vol. 1: Our Lady of The Shadows Vol. 2: God Save The Queen
Vampirella	Vol. 3	March–August 2016	#1–6	Kate Leth	Eman Casallos	Vampirella: Hollywood Horror
Vampirella	Vol. 4	February 2017 – January 2018	#0–11	Paul Cornell, Jeremy Whitley,	Jimmy Broxton, Andy Belanger, Creees Lee, Paulo Barrios, Rapha Lobosco	Vol. 1: Forbidden Fruit Vol. 2: The God You Know
Vampirella	Vol. 5	July 2019 – November 2021	#0–25	Christopher Priest	Ergun Gunduz	Vol. 1: Seduction of the Innocent Vol. 2: Seduction of the Innocent Vol. 3: Interstellar Vol. 4: Red Mass
Vengeance of Vampirella		October 2019 – December 2021	#1–25	Tom Sniegoski	Michael Sta. Maria	Vengeance of Vampirella Volume 1: Rebirth Vol. 2: The Spoils of War Vol. 3: Ghost Dance Vol. 4: After The Fall
Vampirella	Vol.6	February 2024 –March 2025	#666-675	Christopher Priest	Ergun Gunduz, Ivan F. Silva	*
Vampirella	Vol. 7	March 2025 – February 2026	#1–12	Christopher Priest	Ergun Gunduz	*
Vampirella	vol.8	April 2026-Present	# 1-present	Christopher Priest	Davis Goetten	

==== Limited Series ====
Title		Publication date	Issues	WRITER	ARTIST	Collection editions
Limited series
Vampirella and the Scarlet Legion		May–October 2011	#1–5	Joe Harris	Jose Malaga	Vampirella and the Scarlet Legion
Vampirella: The Red Room		April–November 2012	#1–4	Dan Brereton	Jean Diaz	Vampirella: The Red Room
Vampirella: Southern Gothic		August 2013 – February 2014	#1–5	Nate Cosby	Jose Luis	Vampirella: Southern Gothic
Vampirella Strikes	Vol. 1	January–June 2013	#1–6	Tom Sniegoski	Johnny D.	Vampirella Strikes
Vampirella: Feary Tales		October 2014 – February 2015	#1–5	Nancy A. Collins, Gail Simone, Devin Grayson, John Shirley, Stephen R. Bissette	Jack Jadson, Ronilson Freire, Elmo Eklabuz, Bilquis Evely, Eman Casallos	Vampirella: Feary Tales
Legenderry: Vampirella		February–June 2015	#1–5	David Avallone	David T. Cabrera	Legenderry: Vampirella
Vampirella: Roses for the Dead		June 2018 – June 2019	#1–4	Kristina Deak-Linsner	Joseph Michael Linsner	Vampirella: Rose for the Dead
Vampirella: The Dark Powers		December 2020 – April 2021	#1–6	Dan Abnett	Paul Davidson	Vampirella: Dark Powers
Vampiverse		September 2021 – February 2022	#1–6	Tom Sniegoski, Jeannine Acheson	Daniel Maine	Vampiverse
Vampirella Strikes	Vol. 2	May 2022 – May 2023	#1–13	Tom Sniegoski	Jonathan Lau	Vampirella Strikes Vol. 1: Hell on Earth
Vampirella: Year One		July 2022 – April 2023	#1–6	Christopher Priest	Giovanni Timpano, Ergun Gunduz	Vampirella: Year One
Vampirella: Mindwarp		September 2022 – January 2023	#1–5	Jeff Parker	Ben Dewey	Vampirella: Mindwarp
Vampirella: Dead Flowers		October 2023 – January 2024	#1–4	Sara Frazetta, Bob Freeman	Alberto Locatelli	*
Vampirella: Armageddon		July 2025 – June 2026	#1–12	Tom Sniegoski	Kewber Baal (#1-5), Edu Menna (#6-12)	*
Vampirella: Dark Reflections		June 2024 – Present	#1–5	Tom Sniegoski, Jeannine Acheson	Daniel Maine	*

==== One-shots ====
Title	Publication date	Issues	WRITER	ARTIST	Collection editions
One-shots
Vampirella vs. Fluffy the Vampire Killer	October 2012		Mark Rahner	Cezar Razek	Vampirella: Bites
Vampirella: Nublood	February 2013		Mark Rahner, Ty Templeton	Bruce Timm, Cezar Razek	Vampirella: Bites
Vampirella Halloween Special	October 2013		Shannon Eric Denton	Dietrich Smith	*
Altered States Vampirella	March 2015			Nancy A. Collins	Francesco Mann
Savage Tales: Vampirella	May 2018		Burnham, Doug Murray	Anthony Marques, J. Bone, Fernando Ruiz, Daniel HDR, Lui Antonio	*
Vampirella Halloween Special	October 2018		Scott Lobdell, Blake Northcott	Rapha Lobosco, Anthony Marques, Marc Deering	*
Vampirella Valentines Day Special	February 2019		Leah Williams, Michael Golden	Maria Sanapo, Michael Golden	*
Vampirella: Trial of the Soul	September 2020		Bill Willingham	Giuseppe Cafaro	*
Vampirella: Valentine's Day Special 2021	February 2021		Tom Sniegoski, Jeannine Acheson	Marcos Ramos	*
Vampirella 1992	June 2021		Max Bemis	Marcos Ramos, Roberto Castro	*
Vampirella Holiday Special	November 2021		Will Robson	Will Robson	*
Vampirella: Valentine's Day Special 2022	February 2022		Dearbhla Kelly	Jonathan Lau	*
Vampirella: Fairy Tales	August 2022		Soo Lee	Emiliana Pinna	*
Vampirella Helliday 2024 Special		December 2024		Frank Tieri	Mariano Benitiz Chapo
Vampirella Helliday 2025 Special		November 2025		Frank Tieri	Mariano Benitiz Chapo
Vampirella Summer Special 2026		July 2026		Erica Schultz	Adriana Melo
Vampirella Winter Special 2026		February 2026		Liam Johnson	Jordan Michael Johnson, Marc Borstel
Vampirella vs Red Sonja Red City #1		August 2026		Chuck Brown	Paulo H. Mel
Vampirella x Witchblade Special		October 2026		Erica Schultz	Valentina Pinti
Vampirella vs Darkstalkers Special		December 2026		Tim Seeley	Drax

==== Crossovers ====
Title	Publication date	Issues	WRITER	ARTIST	Collection editions
Crossovers
Vampirella vs. Dracula	January 2012– August 2012	#1–6	Joe Harris	Ivan Rodriguez	Vampirella vs. Dracula
Dark Shadows/Vampirella	July – December 2012	#1–5	Marc Andreyko	Patrick Berkenkotter, Jose Malaga	Dark Shadows/Vampirella
Dawn/Vampirella	September 2014 – January 2015	#1–5	Joseph Michael Linsner	Joseph Michael Linsner	Dawn/Vampirella
Aliens/Vampirella	September 2015 – February 2016	#1–6	Corinna Bechko	Javier Garcia-Miranda	*
Swords of Sorrow: Vampirella & Jennifer Blood	May – August 2015	#1–4	Nancy A. Collins	Dave Acosta	*
Vampirella/Army of Darkness	July 2015 - October 2015	#1–4	Mark Rahner	Jethro Morales	Vampirella/Army of Darkness
Hack/Slash vs. Vampirella	October 2017 – February 2018	#1–5	Shawn Aldridge	Rapha Lobosco	Hack/Slash vs. Vampirella
Kiss/Vampirella	June – October 2017	#1–5	Christopher Sebela	Annapaola Martello	Kiss/Vampirella
Vampirella/Dejah Thoris	September 2018 – February 2019	#1–5	Erik Burnham	Ediano Silva	Vampirella/Dejah Thoris
Vampirella vs. Reanimator	December 2018 – April 2019	#1–4	Cullen Bunn	Blacky Shepherd	Vampirella vs. Reanimator
Vampirella/Red Sonja	September 2019 – December 2020	#1–12	Jordie Bellaire	Drew Moss	Vol. 1: These Dark Synchronicities Vampirella/Red Sonja Vol. 2
Red Sonja and Vampirella Meet Betty and Veronica	May 2019 – July 2020	#1–12	Amy Chu	Maria Sanapo, Dan Parent	Red Sonja and Vampirella Meet Betty and Veronica Vol. 1 Red Sonja and Vampirella Meet Betty and Veronica Vol. 2
Vampirella vs. Purgatori	March – July 2021	#1–5	Ray Fawkes	Alvaro Sarraseca	Vampirella vs. Purgatori
Vampirella/Dracula: Unholy	December 2021 – June 2022	#1–6	Christopher Priest	Donny Hadiwidjaja	Vampirella/Dracula Unholy
Vampirella versus Red Sonja	November 2022 – March 2023	#1–5	Dan Abnett	Alessandro Ranaldi	Vampirella versus Red Sonja
Vampirella versus The Superpowers	May – September 2023	#1–5	Dan Abnett	Pasquale Qualano	Vampirella versus The Superpowers
Vampirella/Dracula: Rage	August 2023 – April 2024	#1–6	Christopher Priest	Christian Rosado	Vampirella/Dracula: Rage
Sabrina the Teenage Witch / Vampirella	January 2027	#1-present	Tini Howard	Bill Galvan and Ben Galvan	

==== Spin-offs ====
Title	Publication date	Issues	WRITER	ARTIST	Collection editions
Spin-offs
Sacred Six	July 2020 – August 2021	#1–12	Christopher Priest	Jae Lee, Julius Ohta, Gabriel Ibarra, Guilherme Balbi, Giuseppe Cafaro, Fritz Casas, Stephane Roux	Vol. 1: Numerology Vol. 2: War of Roses
Nyx	November 2021 – October 2022	#1–10	Christos Gage	Marc Borstel	Vol.1: Daddy's Girl Vol. 2: Family Matters
Pantha	January–September 2022	#1–5	Tom Sniegoski and Jeannine Acheson	Igor Lima	Pantha
Draculina	February–September 2022	#1–6	Christopher Priest	Michael Sta Maria	Draculina: 90 hours in San Francisco
Draculina: Blood Simple	February–October 2023	#1–6	Christopher Priest	Michael Sta Maria	Draculina: Blood Simple
Victory	June–November 2023	#1–5	David F. Walker	Brett Weldele	Victory

== Other versions ==
=== Vampi ===
In 2000, a comic book series entitled Vampi began circulation through Anarchy Studio. The series followed Vampi, an alternate futuristic version of Vampirella that seeks to find a cure for her vampirism. The main series ran for 25 issues. Several miniseries followed under the titles Vampi Vicious, Vampi Vicious Circle, Vampi Vicious Rampage, and Vampi vs. Xin. An omnibus edition collecting the first eighteen issues of the initial run was released in 2012 through Dynamite Entertainment.

=== Li'l Vampi ===
In January 2014 Dynamite Entertainment released Li'l, a one-shot comic book by writer Eric Trautmann and artist Agnes Garbowska. The comic followed a child version of Vampirella as she tries to uncover why monsters are destroying the town of Stoker, Maine.

== Media adaptations ==
In 1992 Canadian actor and award-winning screenwriter, Peter Jobin, created the production company Europa Production Investment Corporation and purchased the movie rights to the comic book character Vampirella. Based on the source material, Mr. Jobin wrote the first draft screenplay and began the process of securing financing. Promotional artwork was commissioned from graphic artist William (Bill) Rankine. Promotional and investment packaging was presented at the May 1993 Cannes Film Festival at the American Pavilion. A full page promotional poster was also featured in the May 18, 1993 Hollywood Reporter Cannes '93 Daily Satellite Edition - Day 5. Financing was never fully completed for Vampirella: The Motion Picture and the film rights lapsed.

In 1996, a Vampirella film adaptation was produced by Concorde Pictures, starring Talisa Soto in the title role. In 2021, Dynamite Entertainment announced a new feature film was in development in addition to plans for television adaptations based on the Vampirella Universe.
