= Treasury of British Comics =

Comic book collection imprint

- Parent company: Rebellion Developments
- Founded: 2016
- Country of origin: United Kingdom
- Key people: Keith Richardson; Oliver Pickles
- Publication types: Comic books Trade paperbacks
- Official website: Treasury of British Comics

Treasury of British Comics is a line of comic book collections published by Rebellion Developments, collecting British comics stories from the libraries of Amalgamated Press/Fleetway Publications/IPC Magazines.

== History ==
Rebellion Developments had purchased 2000 AD and Judge Dredd Megazine from Fleetway Publications in 2000. At the time, ownership of the library of material the later had published in its various incarnations was split, with characters who had appeared before 1 January 1970 sold to Danish publisher Egmont as part of TI Media (the latest incarnation of IPC Magazines, who made short-lived licensing deals for the characters with WildStorm (via Time Warner) and Titan Books in 2006. Dan Dare meanwhile was sold off separately to the Dan Dare Corporation, while the fact-based contents of Look and Learn and Ranger were purchased by Look and Learn Magazines Ltd. Fleetway meanwhile licensed occasional reprint collections of the post-1970 material they still owned, notably to small Irish publisher Hibernia Comics.

In 2016, Rebellion purchased the material still owned by Fleetway (then known as the Fleetway/IPC Youth Group), and announced they would be beginning reprints shortly afterwards. The Treasury of British Comics series began later that year, with the collection of "Monster" from the pages of Scream!. Due to the masters being lost, the comic had to be remastered from scans of original issues. Keith Richardson was editor for the range.

In 2018, Rebellion purchased the pre-1970 material from TI Media, and began adding it to the Treasury of British Comics reprint series. In 2019, the first of a series of books reprinting Hugo Pratt's British work was announced. The same year a Funny Pages special was produced for Free Comic Book Day.

In 2020, Rebellion editor Oliver Pickles described the "mission statement" of the imprint as "bringing these ignored masterpieces back to the forefront of the public’s consciousness" when referring to the company's schedule for the year, which included collections of strips including "Third World War", "Billy's Boots", "The Rise and Fall of the Trigan Empire" and "The Thirteenth Floor".

In May 2023 a revival of the traditional British annual with the Treasury of British Comics Annual, which included new material based on vintage properties such as the Spider, the Leopard from Lime Street and Black Beth, backed with reprints of classic material.

== Collections ==
Title	ISBN	Pages	Release date	Contents	Notes
The 10,000 Disasters of Dort	9781786189493	80	3 May 2023	Material from Lion 18 May to 23 November 1968 & 23 May 1974 and Lion Annual 1970 & 1971.	Paperback.Cover by Staz Johnson.
Adam Eterno: A Hero for All Time	9781781088692	110	27 May 2021	Material from Thunder 17 October 1970 to 13 March 1971 and Thunder Annual 1972 to 1974.	Paperback.Cover by Chris Weston.
The Astounding Jason Hyde	9781786186386	208	1 September 2022	Material from Valiant 15 May to 18 December 1965 and Valiant Annual 1968.	Paperback.Cover by Jimmy Broxton.
Badtime Bedtime Stories	9781786185310	96	1 September 2022	Material from Monster Fun 28 June to 26 July, 30 August, 18 October, 1 November, 15 November, 29 November & 20 December 1975.	Hardback. Cover by Leo Baxendale.
The Beatles Story	9781781086179	56	21 February 2018	Material from Look-In between 1981 and 1982.	Hardback. Cover by Arthur Ranson.
Billy's Boots:The Legacy of Dead-Shot Keen (Volume 1)	9781781086711	112	6 February 2020	Material from Scorcher between 10 January 1970 and 9 January 1971	Hardback. Cover by unknown.
Bella at the Bar - Book One	9781781086254	114	12 July 2018	Material from Tammy & June 22 June to 7 September 1974, 22 March to 2 August 1975 & the Tammy Annual 1976.	Paperback. Cover by John Armstrong.
Birdman and Chicken	9781786184924	192	17 March 2022	Material from Krazy December 1976 to 1978 and Krazy Annual 1978–1985.	Paperback. Cover by Trevor Metcalfe.
Black Beth: Vengeance Be Thy Name	9781786186355	80	9 June 2022	Material from Scream! Holiday Special 1988, Scream! & Misty Halloween Special 2018, Misty & Scream! Halloween Special 2020 andBlack Beth and the Devils of Al-Kadesh.	Paperback. Cover by DaNi.
Black Max Volume One	9781781086551	114	4 October 2018	Material from Thunder 17 October 1970 to March 13, 1971, Lion 20 March to 8 May 1971, Lion and Thunder Special 1971 and Thunder Annual 1972.	Paperback. Cover by Alfonso Font.
Black Max Volume Two	9781781088623	112	14 October 2021	Material from Lion 15 May to 25 December 1971 and Thunder Annual 1973.	Paperback. Cover by Ian Kennedy.
The Best of Cat Girl	9780785110798	128	4 August 2022	Material from Sally 14 June to 13 September 1969, 24 January to 30 May 1970, Sally Annual 1971 and Tammy & Jinty 2020 Special.	Paperback. Cover by Elkys Nova.
Charley's War Volume 1: Boy Soldier	9781781086193	320	18 April 2018	Material from Battle 6 January 1979 to 25 October 1980.	Paperback. Cover by Joe Colquhoun.
Charley's War Volume 2: Brothers in Arms	9781781086209	336	17 May 2018	Material from Battle 1 November 1980 to 10 July 1982.	Paperback. Cover by Joe Colquhoun.
Charley's War Volume 3: Remembrance	9781781086216	368	14 June 2018	Material from Battle 2 October 1982 to 26 January 1985.	Paperback. Cover by Joe Colquhoun.
Clash of the Guards	9781781086216	96	26 July 2023	Material from Battle 26 September 1981 to 20 February 1982.	Paperback. Cover by Cam Kennedy.
Classic Gums: The Monster Fun Years	9781786189998	128	22 November 2023	Material from Monster Fun 7 February to 30 October 1976 and Monster Fun Annual 1977 to 1985.	Paperback. Cover by Robert Nixon.
The Concrete Surfer	9781781087633	80	17 September 2020	Material from Jinty 28 January to 10 June 1978 and Jinty Special 1978.	Paperback. Cover by Christine Ellingham.
Death Squad	9781781087688	128	4 November 2020	Material from Battle 12 July 1980 to 4 June 1981, and Battle Annual 1982.	Paperback. Cover by Eric Bradbury.
Death Wish Volume One: Best Wishes	9781781086803	116	11 July 2019	Material from Speed 23 February to 25 October 1980 and Speed Annual 1980 to 1981.	Paperback. Cover by Vanyo.
Dr. Mesmer's Revenge	9781781086872	128	3 October 2019	Material from Lion 16 October 1971 to October 21, 1972. (Note: Incorrectly accredited to Thunder on the front cover of the collection)	Paperback. Cover by Carlos Cruz.
The Dracula File	9780785110798	96	19 October 2017	Material from Scream! 24 March to 30 June 1984 and Scream! Holiday Special 1985 to 1988.	Paperback. Cover by Chris Weston.
Faceache Volume 01: The First Hundred Scrunges	9781781086018	112	19 October 2017	Material from Jet 1 May to 25 September 1971 and Buster 2 October 1971 to 24 March 1973	Hardback. Cover by Ken Reid.
Fran of the Floods	9781781086728	112	20 March 2019	Material from Jinty January to September 1976	Hardback/paperback. Cover by Phil Gascoine.
Hellman of Hammer Force	9781781089422	112	8 December 2021	Material from Action 14 February to 18 December 1976	Paperback. Cover by Carlos Ezquerra.
Hellman of Hammer Force: Downfall	9781837860982 (p/b) 9781837862542 (h/b)	128	27 March 2024	Material from Battle 19 November 1977 to 8 July 1978.	Standard paperback edition. A limited hardcover edition with a new cover by Mike Dorey was available from the 2000 AD and Treasury of British Comics webstores.
The House of Dolmann	9781786184917	144	14 April 2022	Material from Valiant 8 October 1966 to 6 May 1967	Paperback. Cover by Brian Bolland.
Invasion 1984!	9781781086759	128	2 May 2019	Material from Battle 26 March to 31 December 1983	Paperback. Cover by Eric Bradbury.
The Best of Jane Bond	9781786188021	96	12 April 2023	Material from Tina 25 February to 16 September 1967, Princess Tina 2 March 1968 to 6 April 1969 & 6 December 1969 to 28 February 1970	Paperback. Cover by Mike Hubbard.
The Incredible Adventures of Janus Stark	N/A (Note: Exclusive to Rebellion's website.)	52	8 April 2020	Material from Smash! 15 March to 7 June 1969	Paperback. Cover by Francisco Solano Lopez.
The Incredible Adventures of Janus Stark, Volume II	N/A	52	26 May 2020	Material from Smash! 14 June to 27 September 1969	Paperback. Cover by Francisco Solano Lopez.
The Incredible Adventures of Janus Stark, Volume III	9781786185631	52	30 June 2021	Material from Smash! 4 October 1969 to 28 February 1970	Paperback. Cover by Francisco Solano Lopez.
Jinty - The Land of No Tears & The Human Zoo	9781781086247	112	28 June 2018	Material from Jinty 5 November 1977 to 11 February 1978 and 12 August 1978 to 13 January 1979	Paperback. Cover by Guy Peeters.
The John Steel Files	9781781088463	128	11 November 2020	Material from Thriller Picture Library #371 and #379.	Paperback. Cover by V. V. Glass.
The Complete Johnny Future: The Missing Link	9781781087589	208	30 April 2020	Material from Fantastic 18 February 1967 to 3 February 1968.	Hardback. Cover by Luis Bermejo.
Karl the Viking - Volume I: The Sword of Eingar	9781786184627	242	20 January 2020	Material from Lion 29 October 1960 to 1 December 1962	Paperback. Cover by Don Lawrence.
Karl the Viking - Volume II: The Voyage of the Sea Raiders	9781786187338	244	22 December 2020	Material from Lion 1 December 1962 to 29 September 1964 and Lion Annual 1963-66 & 1969.	Paperback. Cover by Don Lawrence.
Ken Reid's Creepy Creations	9781781086605	96	29 November 2018	Material from Shiver and Shake 10 March 1973 to 5 October 1974.	Hardback. Cover by Ken Reid.
Ken Reid's World-Wide Weirdies Vol:One	9781781086926	112	29 November 2019	Material from Whoopee! & Shiver and Shake 12 October 1974 to 6 November 1976.	Hardback. Cover by Ken Reid.
Ken Reid's Football Funnies: The First Half	9781781088838	144	5 August 2021	Material from Scorcher and Score 10 January 1970 to 6 May 1972.	Hardback. Cover by Ken Reid.
Leo Baxendale's Sweeny Toddler	9781781087268	112	25 July 2019	Material from Shiver and Shake 10 March 1973 to 5 October 1974 and Whoopee! 23 November 1974 to 7 June 1975.	Hardback. Cover by Leo Baxendale.
The Leopard from Lime Street: Volume 1	9781781085974	160	12 July 2017	Material from Buster 27 March 1976 to 11 June 1977.	Paperback. Cover by Mike Western.
The Leopard from Lime Street: Volume 2	9781781086780	176	12 June 2019	Material from Buster 18 June 1977 to 15 July 1978.	Paperback. Cover by Mike Western.
The Leopard from Lime Street: Volume 3	9781786188304	192	15 March 2023	Material from Buster 22 July 1978 to 29 September 1979.	Paperback. Cover by Mike Western.
Loner	9781781086841	224	4 September 2019	Material from Wildcat 22 October 1988 to 7 April 1989, Wildcat Winter Special 1989, Wildcat Holiday Special 1990, Eagle 29 April 1989 to 21 April 1990, Eagle Holiday Special 1990 and Eagle Annual 1991.	Paperback. Cover by Eric Bradbury.
Major Eazy vs. Rat Pack	9781781088555	48	30 September 2020	Material from Battle 29 January to 23 April 1977.	Hardback. Cover by Carlos Ezquerra.
Major Eazy Volume One: The Italian Campaign	9781781089811	160	4 March 2021	Material from Battle 10 January 1976 to 22 January 1977.	Paperback. Cover by Carlos Ezquerra.
Marney the Fox	9781781085981	160	5 October 2017	Material from Buster 22 June 1974 to 11 September 1976.	Hardback. Cover by John Stokes.
El Mestizo	9781781086575	64	15 November 2018	Material from Battle 4 June to 17 September 1977.	Hardback. Cover by Carlos Ezquerra.
Misty Vol. 1 Featuring: Moon Child & The Four Faces of Eve.	9781781084526	112	7 September 2016	Material from Misty 4 February to 29 April 1978 & 17 June to 2 September 1978.	Paperback. Cover by Shirley Bellwood.
Misty Vol. 2 Featuring: The Sentinels & End Of The Line...	9781781086001	112	15 November 2017	Material from Misty 4 February to 22 April 1978 & 12 August to 18 November 1978.	Paperback.
Misty Vol. 3	9781781086513	96	19 September 2018	Material from Misty 31 March & 5 May to 18 August 1979.	Paperback. Cover by Mario Capaldi & Shirley Bellwood.
Misty Presents: The Jordi Badia Romero Collection	9781781086896	128	16 October 2019	Material from Misty 10 June 1978 to 12 January 1980. Misty Annual 1981.	Hardback. Cover by Jordi (Jorge) Badia Romero.
Misty Presents: The Jaume Rumeu Collection	9781781089378	128	10 November 2021	Material from Misty17 June to 16 September, 28 October & 9 December 1978 and in Tammy & Misty 19 January to 22 March 1980.	Paperback. Cover by Jaume Rumeu.
Misty: 45 Years of Fear	9781786187994	272	28 September 2023	Material from Misty4 February to 29 April 1978, 1 July 1978, 14 October 1978, 5 May to 1 September 1979, 15 December 1979. Misty Annual 1985 & 1986, Misty Winter Special 2020 & Scream! & Misty Special 2020.	Hardback. Cover by unknown. Design by Gemma Sheldrake.
Monster	9781781084533	192	13 July 2016	Material from Scream! 24 March to 30 June 1984, Eagle 1 September 1984 to 30 May 1985, Scream Holiday Special 1986 to 1988	Paperback. Cover by Jesus Redondo.
One-Eyed Jack	9781781085721	160	14 June 2017	Material from Valiant 20 December 1975 to 16 October 1976, Battle 23 October 1976 to 28 May 1977, Valiant Annual 1978	Paperback. Cover by John Cooper.
Robot Archie and the Time Machine	9781837861699 (p/b) 9781837862443 (h/b)	144	22 May 2024	Lion, 20 April 1968 to 11 January 1969; Lion & Valiant Special Extra! 1969; Lion Summer Special 1970	Standard paperback edition. A limited hardback edition (with a cover by Bert Bus) was available exclusively from the 2000 AD and Treasury of British Comics webstores
Roy of the Rovers: The Best of the 1950s	9781781087176	96	25 July 2019	Material from Tiger between 11 September 1954 and 21 May 1955, 20 August 1955 to 11 February 1956. Roy of the Rovers Annuals 1958 & 1959.	Hardback. Cover by G.Keane.
Roy of the Rovers: The Best of the 1960s	9781781087183	96	22 August 2019	Material from Tiger & Comet between 19 December 1959 and 21 January 1961, 22 January to 28 May 1966. Roy of the Rovers Annual 1969.	Hardback. Cover by unknown.
Roy of the Rovers: The Best of the 1970s - The Tiger Years	9781781087923	118	28 May 2020	Material from Tiger between 16 June and 6 October 1973, 3 August to 28 December 1974, 4 January to 21 June 1975.	Hardback. Cover by Yvonne Hutton.
Roy of the Rovers: The Best of the 1970s - The Roy of the Rovers Years	9781781088043	182	4 March 2021	Material from Roy of the Rovers between 25 September and 25 December 1976, 1 January to 21 May 1977, 7 January to 3 June 1978, 10 March to 2 June 1979.	Hardback. Cover by David Sque.
Roy of the Rovers: The Best of the 1980s - Who Shot Roy Race?	9781781088968	176	10 June 2021	Material from Roy of the Rovers between 3 January 1981 and 5 June 1982. Roy of the Rovers Annual 1982.	Hardback. Cover by David Sque.
Roy of the Rovers: The Best of the 1980s Volume 2 - Dream Team	9781786189509	176	8 June 2023	Material from Roy of the Rovers between 27 July 1985 and 10 May 1986. Roy of the Rovers Annual 1984.	Hardback. Cover by David Sque.
The Rise and Fall of the Trigan Empire Volume I	9781781087558	304	19 March 2020	Material from Ranger 18 September 1965 to 18 June 1966 and Look and Learn 25 June 1966 to 17 May 1968.	Paperback. Cover by Don Lawrence.
The Rise and Fall of the Trigan Empire Volume II	9781781087756	288	24 December 2020	Material from Look and Learn 24 May 1968 to 14 November 1970.	Paperback. Cover by Don Lawrence.
The Rise and Fall of the Trigan Empire Volume III	9781781087756	256	22 July 2021	Material from Look and Learn 21 November 1970 to 10 February 1973.	Paperback. Cover by Don Lawrence.
The Rise and Fall of the Trigan Empire Volume IV	9781786185648	240	26 October 2022	Material from Look and Learn 17 February 1973 to 4 January 1975 and Ranger Book 1967.	Paperback. Cover by Don Lawrence.
The Sarge Volume 1	9781786186331	146	12 May 2022	Material from Battle 25 June 1977 to 18 March 1978.	Hardback. Cover by Mike Western.
A Spell of Trouble	9781786186126	80	12 October 2022	Material from Jinty 9 April 1977 to 2 July 1977 and 5 July 1980 to 30 September 1980.	
The Spider's Syndicate of Crime	9781781089057	144	15 April 2022	Material from Lion 26 June 1965 to 18 June 1966 and Lion Annual 1967.	Paperback. Cover by Reg Bunn. Due to copyright reasons, the volume was released as Jerry Siegel's Syndicate of Crime in North America.
The Spider: Crime Unlimited	9781786184658	256	3 February 2023	Material from Super Picture Library - Fantastic Series #2 and Super Picture Library - Stupendous Series #4	Hardback.
The Spider's Syndicate of Crime versus the Crook from Outer Space	9781786189738	144	5 July 2023	Material from Lion 25 June 1966 to 28 January 1967.	Paperback. Cover by Reg Bunn. Due to copyright reasons, the volume was released as Jerry Siegel's Syndicate of Crime versus the Crook from Outer Space in North America.
The Steel Claw - Invisible Man	9781781089064	128	2 February 2021	Material from Valiant 6 October 1962 to 21 September 1963 and Valiant Annual 1965 to 1966.	Paperback.
The Steel Claw - Reign of the Brain	9781786186812	112	10 November 2022	Material from Valiant 28 September 1963 to 19 September 1964.	Paperback.
The Steel Claw - The Cold Trail	9781786186591	128	19 January 2023	Material from Super Picture Library - Stupendous Series #5	Hardback.
Steel Commando - Full Metal Warfare	9781781086810	160	22 August 2019	Material from Thunder 17 October 1970 to 27 February 1971; Lion 20 March 1970 to 16 December 1972, Valiant 25 May to 22 June 1974 and Thunder Annual 1972 to 1974.	Paperback, digest-sized.
The Best of Sugar Jones	9781781087701	112	26 November 2020	Material from Pink 16 October 1974 to 21 May 1977.	Paperback. Cover by Rafael Busom Clua.
Third World War Book One	9781781087510	208	9 January 2020	Material from Crisis #1-14	Paperback. Cover by Carlos Ezquerra.
Third World War Book Two: Back to Babylon	9781781089293	256	5 January 2021	Material from Crisis #15-34	Paperback. Cover by Carlos Ezquerra.
The Thirteenth Floor Vol. 01	9781781086537	176	18 October 2018	Material from Scream! 24 March to 30 June 1984 and Eagle 1 September 1984 to 13 April 1985.	Paperback. Cover by José Ortiz.
The Thirteenth Floor Vol. 02	9781781087725	176	15 October 2020	Material from Eagle 20 April 1985 to 22 January 1986, Scream! Holiday Special 1982 and Eagle Holiday Special 1986.	Paperback. Cover by José Ortiz.
The Thirteenth Floor Vol. 03	9781781089347	176	16 September 2021	Material from Eagle 1 March 1986 to 28 February 1987 and Eagle Annual 1987.	Paperback. Cover by José Ortiz.
The Thirteenth Floor - The Return of Max	9781837860180	80	28 September 2023		Paperback.
Turbo Jones	9781781086841	224	10 January 2019	Material from Wildcat 22 October 1988 to 7 April 1989, Wildcat Winter Special 1989, Wildcat Holiday Special 1990 and Eagle and Wildcat 29 April to 7 October 1989	Paperback. Cover by Ian Kennedy.
Treasury of British Comics Annual:2024	9781837860258		8 November 2023		Hardback. Cover by Henry Flint.
A Very British Affair: The Best of Classic Romance Comics	9781786187710	228	2 February 2023	Material from various issues of Mirabelle, Valentine, Marilyn, Serenade, Roxy and Mates	Paperback.
Von Hoffman's Invasion: Book 1	9781781086261	128	23 August 2018	Material from Jet 1 May to 25 September 1971 and Buster 2 October 1971 to 5 February 1972	Paperback.
War Picture Library - Battle Stations	9781781087527	64	20 February 2020	Material from War at Sea Picture Library #34	Hardback. Cover by Hugo Pratt.
War Picture Library - Battle of Britain	9781781087794	128	16 April 2020	Material from Air Ace Picture Library #65 & #182	Hardback. Cover by Ian Kennedy.
War Picture Library - Battler Britton	9781781087664	64	8 July 2020	Material from Thriller Picture Library #297, Battler Britton Annual, and Hurricane Annual 1965.	Hardback. Cover by Hugo Pratt.
War Picture Library - Night of the Devil	9781781089033	144	16 February 2021	Material from Battle Picture Library #62 and War Picture Library #91.	Hardback. Cover by Hugo Pratt.
