= Black Beth =

British comic book character

- Black Beth as featured in Scream! Holiday Special 1988, art by Blas Gallego.

Character information
- First appearance: Scream! Holiday Special 1988 (1988)

In-story information
- Full name: Beth
- Species: Human
- Partnerships: Quido
- Abilities: Expert swordfighter

Publication information
- Publisher: IPC Magazines; Rebellion Developments
- Schedule: Irregular
- Title(s): Scream! Holiday Special 1988; Scream! & Misty Halloween Special 2018; Misty & Scream! 2020 Special; Black Beth and the Devils of Al-Kadesh

Creative team
- Writer(s): Alec Worley
- Artist(s): Blas Gallego; DaNi

Reprints
- Collected editions
- Black Beth - Vengeance Be Thy Name: ISBN 9781786186386

Black Beth is a British comic character who has appeared in eponymous strips published by IPC Magazines and Rebellion Developments. While the character was created in the 1970s, she did not appear in print until 1988, debuting in the Scream! Holiday Special. After a further hiatus of thirty years, Black Beth was revived by Rebellion in 2018. The story concerns a roaming, avenging female warrior in a fantasy world.

== Creation ==
IPC Magazines was one of the biggest British comic publishers in the 1970s and considered a horror anthology named Scream in response to a potential gap in the market. Dummy copies were made of the title, which advanced enough to plan a dark fantasy story named "Black Beth" was drawn by Spanish artist Blas Gallego, who was mainly experienced in providing illustrations for magazines at the time. The writer of the story has never been established, nor has the intended format - while serials in British weekly comics were typically between two and four pages long, the "Black Beth" story was 23 pages. Eventually, IPC management got cold feet, and the title was shelved with the completed Black Beth strip placed in inventory.

== Publishing history ==
In 1984, IPC revived the Scream! concept. However, the title was short-lived and only lasted 15 issues before being merged with Eagle. Despite this - in common with several canceled regular comics of the period - seasonal specials still bearing the magazine's name were published, often using reprints and inventory; the final Scream Holiday Special was printed in 1988, and the full "Black Beth" story was among the content.

Among those who read the story was a young Alec Worley, who would later write "Judge Anderson" and "Durham Red" for 2000 AD. Admitting he was "obsessed" with the character, when he found out 2000 AD publisher Rebellion Developments had purchased the IPC Youth Group (consisting of IPC and Fleetway's post-1970 library) and were planning to revive old characters for a series of specials, Worley began lobbying Rebellion editor Keith Richardson to bring back Black Beth. Richardson was also a fan of the story, thinking the artwork was closer to material in Warren Publishing magazines such as Creepy or Eerie than typical British artwork, and greenlighted a story for the 2018 Scream! & Misty Halloween Special anthology. After pitching successfully for the job of writer, Worley reached out to Greek artist DaNi - with whom he had worked with on a strip for the previous year's special, "Fate of the Fairy Hunter". DaNi recalled her initial reaction to seeing the Gallego art was "Wow, this is some fucking great visual style", and she strove to follow the original's highly detailed work for the six-page strip. The new team felt the original design was strong and needed to be retained, though the British horror icon Barbara Steele was used as an influence.

The pair reunited to produce a longer 8-page strip (again using black-and-white art) for the Misty & Scream! 2020 Special. Worley researched some of the filming locations for Conan the Barbarian in Almería; the 'Tree of Woe' which Arnold Schwarzenegger's Conan was crucified on during the movie was still standing, and featured in the "Black Beth" strip as 'the Witch Tree'.

Interest in the character was enough for Rebellion to publish a one-shot centered on the character in June 2021, Black Beth and the Devils of Al-Kadesh. The comic featured the character in colour for the first time; as well as a 32-page full-length story by Worley and DaNi in colour, it also contained a three-page short black-and-white story illustrated by Andrea Bulgarelli, as well as an unrelated backup featuring Richardson's Death-Man character. DaNi relished the chance to work on the character again, telling John Freeman "Who wouldn’t want to draw a fierce black-haired girl with a helmet and a sword, in a world full of dark magic?", while Worley also appreciated the longer length the format allowed.

The following year Rebellion collected all of the character's adventures to date in the trade paperback Black Beth - Vengeance Be Thy Name. As well as the mass-market paperback, Rebellion released a hardcover exclusive to their Treasury of British Comics webshop.

== Plot summary ==
Cinder-witch Moldred makes a prophecy to Count Wolfgang Rassau, warning the warlord known as the Beast of Holsteg and his followers of coming vengeance for their evils, in the form of an armoured woman on a horse, the village of Holsteg and the name 'Beth'. Claiming she is trying to trick him, Rassau refuses to pay Moldred but leads his bodyguards to Holsteg regardless, arriving as two locals called Karl and Beth are about to be wed. Due to the prophecy he tries to take Beth captive, and a fight breaks out during which the villagers are massacred by the Count and his men. Left for dead, Beth is found by local blind outcast dwarf Quido, who takes her to his forest lair and helps her recover. As she does so, she trains with Quido's sword; he was once a feared warrior of the Count until standing up to his growing cruelty and was blinded by Rassau in response. Beth persuades Quido to train her to get revenge on Rassau. He agrees and also provides her with a suit of armor – due to its color, she takes on the name of Black Beth – and his horse, Nightshade. She gathers other survivors of the Count's oppressive ways, and they march on Castle Rassau. Her army is spotted, and fearing Moldred's words are coming true, Rassau prepares to escape with his treasure rather than fight. The peasant army storms the castle, but Beth insists on pursuing Rassau, with Quido following her. The Count sets up an ambush, but Beth's armor protects her from their crossbows. She kills his remaining men, while Rassau himself falls to his death, fleeing in terror.

Black Beth and Quido then traveled the land, following prophecies Mildred gave in return for riches taken from villains. She freed children from being sacrificed by Koschoi the Warlock, saving a soothsayer from hanging while on a pilgrimage to the Witch Tree of Mournveil and defending the city of Al-Kadesh from the demonic Anis-Amunn.

== Collected edition ==
| Title | ISBN | Publisher | Release date | Contents |
|---|---|---|---|---|
| Black Beth - Vengeance Be Thy Name | 9781786186355 | Rebellion Developments | 9 June 2022 | Material from Scream! Holiday Special 1988, Scream! & Misty Halloween Special 2018, Misty & Scream! 2020 Special andBlack Beth and the Devils of Al-Kadesh |

== Reception ==
"Black Beth" has received positive critical response. Richard Bruton gave both the Black Beth and the Devils of Al-Kadesh one-shot and the trade collection 10 out of 10 for Comicon.com, particularly praising the work of both Gallego and DaNi and how well their styles meshed despite the decade's interval between the contents. The strong visuals were also praised by Ian Keogh, reviewing the collected edition for Slings & Arrows.
