= Tom Kerr =

British comic strip artist

- Born: Thomas David Kerr; 1915; Hackney, London, England
- Died: 1984 (aged 68–69); Eastbourne, East Sussex, England
- Occupation: comic strip artist
- Known for: comic annuals of the 1960s and 1970s
- Notable work: Rip Kerrigan strip, Adam Eterno hero
- Spouse: {hyllis (m. 1951)
- Children: 1 son

Tom Kerr (1915–1984) was a British comic strip artist whose work has appeared in comics such as Look-in, the Eagle, Valiant, and TV21. He has also drawn for many annuals of the 1960s and 1970s, including the Monkees annuals, Look-in annuals, etc. He is not to be conflated with the Australian cartoonist of the same name, who was responsible for such creations as Daddles, an animated duck that would walk along the TV screen when a cricketer scored a duck.

== Early life ==
Thomas David Kerr was born in Hackney, London and died at Eastbourne, East Sussex. He married Phyllis in 1951. They had a son.

== Career ==
=== Comic strips ===
Strips include Boy Bandit in Jag (later Tiger) 1968–1969 and the Tara King/The Avengers strip in TV Comic (1968). He also worked for comics such as Lion, Buster, Thunder, The Eagle, Knockout, Valiant, Princess, TV21, Lady Penelope, Solo, and Jet (including "The Dwarf").

IPC planned a comic strip character called Captain Britain which was to be drawn by Kerr during the early 1970s. Marvel later produced a similar character but the idea seemed to be dropped by IPC long before this.

=== 1940s and 1950s ===
His early work appears as far back in 1949 when he drew for Pets' Playtime Comic published by Philmar. Later work included Fay in the Weekend Mail Comic in 1955 and Monty Carstairs in Mickey Mouse Weekly. He drew for many British girls' comics, including Marilyn, School Friend, Girls' Crystal, and June.

=== 1960s ===
Rip Kerrigan was a strip he did for Buster in 1961–62, and also worked on Kelly's Eye, Captain Hurricane, The Steel Claw, Charlie Peace, Kraken, and Black Axe.

=== 1970s ===
In 1970, he drew the first-ever Adam Eterno strip in Thunder. This would be his only time doing so.

In the 1970s, he drew for Twinkle and Little Star, and his career seemed to end soon after this.
