= The Dracula File =

British comic book story

- The cover to the final issue of Scream!, dated 30 June 1984. Art by Eric Bradbury.

Publication information
- Publisher: IPC Magazines; Rebellion Developments
- Schedule: Weekly
- Title(s): Scream! 24 March to 30 June 1984
- Formats: Original material for the series has been published as a strip in the comics anthology(s) Scream!.
- Publication date: 24 March – 30 June 1984
- Main character(s): Dracula; Colonel Stakis

Creative team
- Writer(s): Gerry Finley-Day; Simon Furman
- Artist(s): Eric Bradbury

Reprints
- Collected editions
- The Dracula File: ISBN 9780785110798

"The Dracula File" is a British comic horror strip published by IPC Magazines and Rebellion Developments. It debuted in the first issue of the weekly anthology comic Scream on 24 March 1984. The story was written by Gerry Finley-Day and later Simon Furman, and was drawn by Eric Bradbury. The story featured Count Dracula escaping from the Eastern Bloc at the height of the Cold War before appearing in modern-day England, with KGB Colonel Stakis in pursuit. Scream was short-lived, being merged into Eagle in June 1984 after only 15 issues.

The story was not continued after the merger, but retains a cult following and has been released in trade paperback form by Rebellion Developments.

== Creation ==
In 1984, IPC's juvenile division felt there was a gap in the market for a horror title as the genre grew in popularity on the back of successful films, and group editor Barrie Tomlinson was charged with putting together Scream!, with the support of managing editor Gil Page. He felt a vampire strip was in order, and that the perennial nature of Count Dracula made him a good focal point. Tomlinson assigned writer Gerry Finley-Day and artist Eric Bradbury to the story. Finley-Day had cut his teeth in editorial at the company's girls' comics division before moving to freelance writing and scripting numerous stories for Battle and 2000 AD. Bradbury meanwhile had experience stretching back four decades, and had contributed to atmospheric boys' adventure strips such as "Maxwell Hawke" in Buster, "Cursitor Doom" in Smash!, and "Danny Doom" in Valiant. The pair had worked together on the early instalments of the 2000 AD story "Invasion!", in 1977. As Scream! was put together, Cold War tensions were high. Ian Rimmer, who would be appointed editor of the new title, felt "The Dracula File" was an important story for the comic and had it placed "in primary position" on page 3, and to be the longest in Scream! at five pages per issue.

== Publishing history ==
Shortly after publication began, Finley-Day fell behind schedule and assistant editor Simon Furman began writing the story, initially as a fill-in and then permanently when the disenchanted Finley-Day left the comic. Scream! itself was beset by management interference and ended after just 14 issues, not helped by an industrial strike hitting any early momentum. The title was merged into Eagle. While "The Thirteenth Floor" and "Monster" were continued in Eagle after the merger, "The Dracula Files" wasn't and some plot points were left unresolved. The strip would make occasional returns in Scream! Holiday Specials, however. Scream! aficionado David McDonald has suggested the first of these, drawn by Bradbury, was written for the weekly before its cancellation. Later one-offs featured work from Geoff Senior and Kenneth Page. In 2015, McDonald leased the rights to the "Dracula Files" and printed a low-volume collection under Hibernia Books.

Having purchased the rights to IPC's post-1 January 1970 catalogue in 2016, Rebellion Developments released a new "Dracula File" strip in the 2017 Scream! and Misty Special. The new story was written by Gráinne McEntee and drawn by Tristan Jones, both of whom praised the original and incorporated elements of it into their style for the new strip.

Shortly afterwards, a collection of the original story was announced as part of Rebellion's Treasury of British Comics series. The book featured a new cover by Chris Weston, the material from the specials and a written piece on Scream!'s history by McDonald.

== Plot summary ==
A stranger escapes from his coffin behind the Iron Curtain, takes an East German military uniform and sprints into West Berlin. Despite being riddled with machine gun fire the man is alive and taken to a British military hospital in West Germany, where his survival baffles doctors before the building catches fire, destroying the records. The defector survives; fearing the blaze was a KGB assassination attempt, the injured man is shipped to England by MI5. However, the man is revealed to be Count Dracula, who takes control of one of the nurses and a security agent, while feeding on people including a farmer, a man watching Dracula's Death at a nearby cinema, two guests at a fancy dress party and a taxi driver, causing a mass panic and baffling the police. Word of the spate of killings reaches the KCG, where Rumanian Colonel Stakis realises Dracula is behind them. Despite his superiors being unwilling to do anything to help the West, Stakis is determined to stop the vampire, and slips across into Western Berlin as Dracula gives MI5 the slip and sets up a base in London.

Dracula continues his campaign in London, pursued by Stakis. Being hunted is nothing new for the vampire, however, who survived an attack by the determined Alexander Quinn and his burley assistant Carl in 1892.

== Collected editions ==
Title	ISBN	Publisher	Release date	Contents
The Dracula File	N/A	Hibernia Books	March 2015	Material from Scream 24 March to 30 June 1984 and Scream! Holiday Special 1985 to 1988.
The Dracula File	9780785110798	Rebellion Developments	19 October 2019	Material from Scream 24 March to 30 June 1984 and Scream! Holiday Special 1985 to 1988.

== Reception ==
John Freeman praised the series when the Hibernia reprint was announced, noting the dark humour mixed in with the traditional horror material.

Reviewing the Rebellion collection for Slings & Arrows, Frank Plowright felt the story was not without positives but warned "this is not a lost masterpiece... the memory may prove stronger than the actuality". Andy Oliver of Broken Frontier pondered whether the Cold War setting made for an "intentional allegory or whether it was simply a topical twist", and felt that while the story was patchwork due to the publication format as short episodes, but praised Bradbury's artwork. Emily Lauer reviewed the collection for WomenWriteAboutComics, and felt it was "a fascinating time capsule".
