= Daddles =

Cartoon character

Daddles, also known as Daddles the duck, is the name of an animated duck who was first introduced in 1977, used in the television coverage of cricket by the Australian Nine Network's Wide World of Sports.

When a batsman is dismissed without scoring, usually referred to as a "duck", an animation of Daddles, dressed as a batsman, is shown using on-screen graphics, crying, tucking his bat under his wing and walking across the screen accompanying the coverage of the departing batsman on his way back to the pavilion. According to Cricinfo, this adds "to the departing batsman's shame" at being dismissed without troubling the scorers. In its most common format, the sound of the duck was similar to an upset-sounding Donald Duck. The duck was used in many cricket broadcasts for nearly 40 years.

== Origins ==
In 1977, Australian media tycoon Kerry Packer organised a break-away professional cricket tournament called World Series Cricket, despite never having played cricket himself. He ensured that Daddles was one of a number of innovations introduced at the new tournament, along with additional cameras placed around the ground, greater usage of slow-motion replays, day-night matches, coloured costumes, white balls and stump-cam. There existed a perception that Test cricket needed to "make major changes" to keep the public interested, and that "observing cricket rated about as high as watching paint dry". The graphical innovation, conceived by Australian cartoonist Tom Kerr (no relation to the British cartoonist of the same name) was brought to David Hill, a sports producer for Nine who later brought further innovative coverage of sports to the United States through his presidency of Rupert Murdoch's Fox Sports. It initially horrified the cricket establishment. It was thought of as "brash" coverage of the game; subsequently, broadcasters such as the United Kingdom's Channel 4, upon announcing that they would be covering the English cricket team in 1999, stated "there will be no cartoon ducks". Daddles was considered to be a way in which to keep young people interested in the long format of the game.

Kerr himself stated on his website in 2016: "I read somewhere that the pommies (the English) hated it, and that is reward in and of itself."

== See also ==
- Primary Club
