= The Dwarf (comics) =

British comic book character

- The Dwarf as featured in the 4 September 1971 issue of Jet, art by Tom Kerr.

Character information
- First appearance: Jet (8 March 1971)

In-story information
- Place of origin: Earth

Publication information
- Publisher: IPC Magazines; Rebellion Developments
- Schedule: Weekly
- Title(s): Jet; 8 May to 25 September 1971; Jet Annual; 1973
- Formats: Original material for the series has been published as a strip in the comics anthology(s) Jet.
- Genre: Science fiction
- Publication date: 8 May – 25 September 1971

Creative team
- Artist(s): Tom Kerr

The Dwarf is a British comic character who has appeared in eponymous strips published by IPC Magazines. The character, a criminal genius who operated an army of highly realistic robots, first appeared in the anthology title Jet on 8 May 1971. The strip mixed adventure and comedy elements, with the Dwarf frequently breaking the fourth wall to address readers directly.

== Creation ==
Since Fleetway Publications and Odhams Press had been merged into IPC Magazines by common owners International Publishing Company in 1969, management had launched several new juvenile titles, including Sally, Scorcher, Cor!!, Score 'n' Roar, Thunder and Tammy. While not all of the titles were successful, market research showed that they boosted the company's overall comic sales, and allowed new readers to be funnelled to extant titles if merged, effectively allowing new titles to function as test beds for new features. Jet was therefore devised as a new boys' adventure title in 1971, despite IPC's previous new effort in the genre (Thunder) having only recently been cancelled.

"The Dwarf" was among the new storylines devised for the comic, and was drawn by the experienced Tom Kerr. The strip was unusual due to the Dwarf frequently directly addressing the audience, a device usually used in humour strips rather than adventure material. Most weekly episodes ended with a frame of the Dwarf gently taunting the readers - or, as the character often called them, "multitude" with his success and his plans to commit another daring crime the next week.

== Publishing history ==
Due to the presence of expanded editorial material, "The Dwarf" did not appear in the launch issue of Jet, instead debuting the following week. Jet was ultimately short-lived, only running for 22 issues before merging into Buster; "The Dwarf" was not among the strips that continued.

Jet and its contents were among the post-1970 IPC Youth Group properties purchased by Rebellion Developments in 2016. As such the Dwarf was among the characters selected to appear in crossover title The Vigilant; The revived version was updated significantly, now showing him as a wheelchair user and bald. Recruited by primary villains Von Hoffman (who had also debuted in Jet) and Doctor Mesmer, the Dwarf was fused with the Iron Major armour.

== Plot summary ==
With crime in London at an all-time low, pompous police Superintendent Smarmy of Scotland Yard is honoured on live television for his achievements. However, the broadcast is interrupted by a boastful character calling himself the Dwarf, who warns Smarmy he is instigating a one-man crime wave. The diminutive genius pilots an array of highly realistic robots as a means of disguise and operates from a suburban tower block called Gallows Court. The flats are a hollow façade housing his workshop and entirely populated by his robots, allowing the Dwarf to operate right under Smarmy's nose.

Despite frequently announcing his targets in advance, the Dwarf's intelligence and inventiveness allow him to carry out a spate of thefts. He often targeted items under the personal guard of Smarmy, leaving his rival humiliated - at one point he was able to chalk a taunting message on the Superintendent's shirt, and escape undetected. As well as the robots, the Dwarf devised numerous other machines pull off his thefts - including a drilling tank called The Mole, a strength-boosting Giant Grip Glove, mechanical bat wings that allowed him to fly and Retro-Powered Shoes which featured springs.

== Reception ==
Author Michael Carroll noted the similarity of both the character's design and behaviour to that of the company's earlier 'King of Crooks', the Spider. Mike Conroy meanwhile included the character in his 2004 book of 500 memorable comic villains.
