= Duck (cricket) =

Cricket term

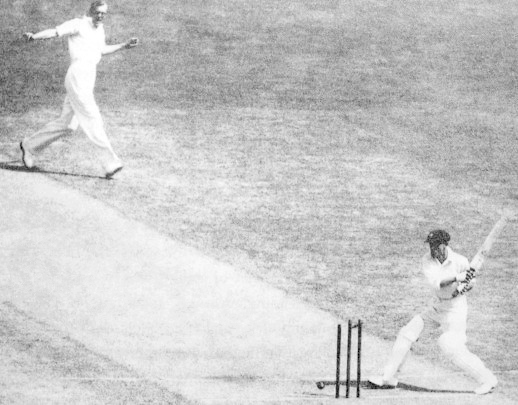
Don Bradman dismissed for a first ball duck in the second Test of the 1932–33 Ashes series on 30 December 1932

In cricket, a duck is a batter’s dismissal with a score of zero. A batter being dismissed off their first delivery faced is known as a golden duck.

== Etymology ==
The term is a shortening of the term "duck's egg", the latter being used long before Test cricket began. When referring to the Prince of Wales' (the future Edward VII) score of nought on 17 July 1866, a contemporary newspaper wrote that the Prince "retired to the royal pavilion on a 'duck's egg'". The name is believed to come from the shape of the number "0" being similar to that of a duck's egg, as in the case of the American slang term "goose-egg" popular in baseball and the tennis term "love", derived – according to one theory – from French l'œuf ("the egg"). The Concise Oxford Dictionary still cites "duck's egg" as an alternative version of the term.

== Significant ducks ==
The first duck in a Test match was made in the first Test, between Australia and England at Melbourne in March 1877, when Ned Gregory was caught by Andrew Greenwood off the bowling of James Lillywhite. As of 2017, the record for the most ducks in Test cricket is held by West Indies player Courtney Walsh, who was out for nought on 43 occasions, while the overall first-class record is 156, set by Worcestershire and England player Reg Perks.

One particularly high-profile example of a duck came in 1948, when Don Bradman was playing his final Test match for Australia, against England at The Oval. In Australia's first innings, Bradman was bowled for a duck by Eric Hollies, causing his Test average to fall from 101.39 to 99.94; had he scored just four runs, his average would have been 100. As things turned out, Australia won the match by an innings, and so Bradman did not get to bat a second time (had he batted, he would have needed at least 104 runs if dismissed or at least four runs if not out to get his average back to 100).

In the first Test of Australia's tour of India in 1986, with the cumulative scores tied, Indian tailender Maninder Singh was trapped LBW by Greg Matthews for a four ball duck, ensuring the second tied Test in Test Cricket history.

Indian all-rounder Ajit Agarkar earned the nickname "Bombay Duck" after being dismissed for ducks five consecutive times in test matches against Australia.

In a 1913 match against Glastonbury Cricket Club in Somerset, all the batsmen for Huish and Langport CC scored ducks for a total of zero runs. A similar occurrence in indoor cricket happened in Kent in 2016, when Bapchild Cricket Club were dismissed for zero against Canterbury Christ Church University.

Most ducks by a batter in their career
Rank	Player (Country)	Career	Mat	Inns	0
1	Muttiah Muralitharan (Sri Lanka)	1992–2011	495	328	59
2	Courtney Walsh (West Indies)	1984–2001	337	264	54
3	Sanath Jayasuriya (Sri Lanka)	1989–2011	586	651	53
4	Glenn McGrath (Australia)	1993–2007	376	207	49
4	Stuart Broad (England)	2006–2023	344	338	49
6	Mahela Jayawardene (Sri Lanka)	1997–2015	652	725	47
7	Daniel Vettori (New Zealand)	1997–2015	442	383	46
8	James Anderson (England)	2002-2024	400	347	45
8	Wasim Akram (Pakistan)	1984–2003	460	427	45
10	Zaheer Khan (India)	2000–2014	309	232	44
10	Shane Warne (Australia)	1992–2007	339	306	44
10	Shahid Afridi (Pakistan)	1996–2018	524	508	44
10	Chris Gayle (West Indies)	1999–2021	483	551	44

== Variations ==
There are several variations used to describe specific types of duck. The usage or prevalence of many of these terms vary regionally, with one term having different meanings in different parts of the world. Even within commentary from ESPN Cricinfo or individual cricket board websites, there is no uniform application of some of these terms.

- A batter who is dismissed by the first ball they face is said to have been dismissed for a golden duck. This term is applied uniformly throughout the cricket world.
- A "second ball" duck is when a batter is dismissed by the second ball they face, when they haven't yet scored. This is also called a silver duck. A third ball duck is appropriately called a bronze duck.
- A batter who is dismissed by the first ball of an innings is said to have been dismissed for a royal or platinum duck.
- A batter who is dismissed without facing a ball (most usually run out from the non-striker's end, but alternatively stumped or run out off a wide delivery) is said to be out for a diamond duck, but in some regions that term has an alternative definition. If the batter is one of the openers, that is said to be a titanium duck. If the batter is timed out without making it to the crease, that is known as a diamond duck or a platinum duck.

== Pair ==
To be dismissed for nought in both innings of the same two-innings match is to be dismissed for a pair, because the two noughts together are thought to resemble a pair of spectacles; the longer form is occasionally used. To be dismissed first ball in both innings (i.e., two golden ducks) is to suffer the indignity of making a king pair.

== Related expressions ==
Two consecutive pairs, or (more generally) four consecutive ducks, are referred to as an Audi. The expression alludes to the German car manufacturer, the logo of which is four linked rings. A player who has been dismissed for three consecutive ducks and not yet scored in a further consecutive innings is said to be "on an Audi".

In 1992, Australian batter Mark Waugh scored successive Test pairs against Sri Lanka, and was given the temporary nickname "Audi". In 2023, Australian wicket-keeper-batter Alyssa Healy almost completed a Test Audi when she feathered a ball from Kate Cross towards Amy Jones during a Women's Ashes match at Trent Bridge, but Jones did not take the proffered catch and Healy went on to score an even 50.

A player who has completed an Audi and is yet to score in yet another consecutive innings is said to be "on an Olympic", an expression alluding to the five interlocking Olympic rings. In Test cricket, three players have completed an Olympic: Bob Holland (1985), Ajit Agarkar (1999–2000) and Mohammad Asif (2006).

== See also ==
- Glossary of cricket terms
- Daddles – Cartoon character
- Golden sombrero – Striking out four times in a single baseball game
- Hat-trick – Terminology in cricket for the dismissal of three batsmen from three consecutive balls
- Names for the number 0 in English
- Pairs in test and first-class cricket – Batter out without scoring in both innings
