= Escolano =

Escolano (Spanish pronunciation: [es.ko.ˈla.no]) is a Spanish surname.

Notable people with this surname include:

- José Gea Escolano (1929–2017), Spanish prelate
- Luis Mercader Escolano (1444–1516), Spanish grand inquisitor
- Sonia Escolano (born 1980), Spanish director
