= José González (artist) =

Spanish comic book artist (born 1939–2009)

- González photographed at his studio in 1979
- Born: 1939 Barcelona, Spain
- Died: 2009 (aged 69–70)
- Area: artist
- Pseudonym: Pepe
- Notable works: Vampirella
- Awards: Warren Award, Best Art in a Story, 1971 and 1974

José "Pepe" González (1939 – 13 March 2009) was a Spanish comic book artist.

== Career ==
=== Early career ===
José González started his career at the age of 17 working on Rosas Blancas and Brigitte for the company Editorial Toray. He joined the agency Selecciones Ilustradas in 1960 and drew romance comics for Fleetway. González also worked as a pin-up artist during this time for the international market.

=== Vampirella ===
Due to his connections with the Selecciones Ilustradas agency, González started working for Warren Publishing in 1971. Jim Warren described his reaction to seeing González's art in The Warren Companion:

The minute I took one look at Pepe González's artwork, I knew we had it! We survived 12 issues but there it was. This is what I wanted for the first issue but couldn't put together.

Starting with issue 12 in 1971, González became the primary artist for the character Vampirella. Comics historian David Roach discusses the reaction to González's art on Vampirella in The Warren Companion:

His first "Vampirella" strip appeared one year later in Vampirella #12 and caused an immediate sensation. Here was the same glamour and sophistication that had worked so well in Britain applied to a character of enormous potential but hitherto little direction. The cover of #19 featured González's memorable full figure painting of Vampirella, a bat balanced on her outstretched hand, which came to symbolize the character on everything from posters to books to stickers and pillows. It was an icon, as a pin-up for adolescents (of all ages) that his vision of her worked best since her strips, particularly in the early day, failed to live up to their potential.

González received immediate acclaim for his work on Vampirella, and his first story won the Warren Award for best art in a story in 1971. González drew the Vampirella story for every issue from issue 12 through issue 34. He won another Warren Award in 1974 for best art on a story for his work in issue 33.

By mid-1974, González's output for Vampirella reduced and multiple fill in artists including Jose Ortiz and Leopold Sanchez contributed Vampirella stories. González would remain as the primary artist for Vampirella for the next few years, but by 1977 he shared duties with artist Gonzalo Mayo. Warren would also reprint the three part series "Herma", which had appeared in 1974 in issues 8-10 of the magazine 1984. After issue 82 of Vampirella in 1979, González ceased drawing for Warren, except for one page pin-up contributions (which had started appearing with issue 39 in 1975) which were printed on the Contents page. González would return to Warren in 1982 and would draw stories for Vampirella in the final 6 non-reprint issues of the title until Warren's bankruptcy. From 1971 through 1983, González drew 58 stories for Warren Publishing, putting him in the top 10 most prolific artists at the company. He drew 53 total strips of Vampirella, making him that title's most prolific artist.

== Bibliography ==
Interior art includes:

=== Warren ===
- Vampirella #12-34, 37-38, 42-44, 50, 53, 56-62, 65-68, 71-72, 74-76, 82, 106, 108, Annual 1972
