= Blas Gallego =

Spanish painter and illustrator (born 1941)

Blas Gallego (born 1941 in Barcelona) is a Spanish artist, painter and illustrator with a career spanning six decades. He has created and drawn comic books and strips, book covers, film posters, role-playing game cards, and portraits, among other formats, for publishers in tens of countries. Gallego is internationally known for his specialization in erotic art.

== Work history ==
Gallego learned artistic drawing while working for the movie advertisement industry in 1955–56, for companies such as Paramount Pictures, Metro-Goldwyn-Mayer, and RKO Pictures, among others. In 1960 he founded a publicity company. From 1962 to 1966 he worked for Creaciones Editoriales, before going in 1966 to work for Selecciones Ilustradas, where he remained until 1968. The next year he moved to England, but came back to Barcelona to get married in 1973. Around that time, he drew the comic of Twins of Evil (1974), started oil painting, lived for a few years in London and for a short while in Stockholm, and drew for publications in Germany, Sweden, Norway, Denmark, Italy, Australia, Japan, among other countries.

In 1977 he worked for the British magazine Woman's Realm and for the German magazine Roman Woche. In 1978 he drew for Woman's Weekly. He also did the illustrations for the series Grandes Amantes ("Great Lovers"), commissioned for Neue Revue (Germany) and published in Norway, Sweden and in the Spanish weekly news magazine Interviú, images for the British magazine Men Only and calendars.

In 1983, he published erotic paintings in Japan via Tank Incorporated. After that, he worked for more than 20 years for the United States market, making illustrations for book covers, film posters and for the Tyndale House Holy Bible in 1990. He drew for Zona 84 as well. During this time, SQP Productions published a collection of his cover art sketches. He drew dozens of covers for Marvel Comics' The Savage Sword of Conan (also published in Scandinavia) and covers as well as regular pages for Tom and Jerry comics (1988–96). Later, he published role-playing game cards (1996) and a daily strip, Ben & Katie in the British Daily Star newspaper in 1998–99.

== Bibliography ==
- Flesh and Fire (1999)
- John Sinclair "Doctor Tod" (2004)
- John Sinclair "Sakuro" (2004)
- John Sinclair "Jason Dark" (2004)
- Gespenster (2004)
- Dolly (2005)
- Animal Rescue Unit (2007 – 4 books)
- Horse Angel (2007)
