= Jet (British comics) =

British weekly comic

- The cover of Jet from 12 June 1971.

Publication information
- Publisher: IPC/Fleetway Publications, 1971
- Schedule: Weekly
- Format: Ongoing series
- Genre: Action/adventure
- Publication date: 1 May – 25 September 1971
- No. of issues: 22
- Main character(s): Bala the Briton; Paddy McGinty's Goat; Sergeants Four; The Sludgemouth Sloggers; Von Hoffman

Creative team
- Written by: Tom Tully
- Artist(s): Eric Bradbury; Fred Holmes; Geoff Jones; Tom Kerr; Francisco Solano López; Ken Reid; Mike Western

Jet was a weekly British comics periodical published by Fleetway Publications from 1 May to 25 September 1971. A boys' adventure comic, the title only lasted for 22 editions before being merged with another Fleetway title, the long-established Buster.

== Publishing history ==
While IPC Magazines' previous attempt to launch a new boys' comic, Thunder, had been short-lived and merged with Lion earlier in 1971 the experiment had not been a complete waste; Thunder's new features had proven popular with readers, and given the post-merger Lion a sales boost. Under group director Jack Le Grand, the decision was taken to try another weekly as a testbed for new stories, which could then be folded into an extant title should the new arrival not find an audience.

The comic was an anthology covering similar areas of adventure and humour as other boys' comics of the period. Fantasy was covered by "Von Hoffman's Invasion", "Bala the Briton", "Paddy McGinty's Goat" and, from the second issue, "The Dwarf"; war by "Sergeants Four" and "Carno's Cadets"; sport by "Adare's Anglians", "Kester Kidd" and "The Sludgemouth Sloggers"; crime by "Partridge's Patch"; and humour by Ken Reid's "Faceache", "The Kids from Stalag 41", Reg Parlett's "Bonehead" and Terry Baye's "Bertie Bumpkin". These were rounded out by text features - factual pages "It's a Weird World" and "The Regiment" (a picture feature on various British military units), and reader-submitted jokes in "Jest a Minute". The first issue included two Trebor Bumper Bars as free gifts; the second featured a 'Monster Wasp' and the third a voucher for free Wall's ice cream.

Priced at 3p and published on Thursdays, to 40-page Jet failed to find an audience, however, and like Thunder was cancelled after 22 weekly issues. Jet was merged into the long-established Buster, where four of the features - "Von Hoffman's Invasion", "The Sludgemouth Sloggers", "Faceache" and "The Kids from Stalag 41", would continue. "Faceache" in particular would have a long run, lasting until 1988 in Buster and becoming a well-remembered strip. Despite the weekly's short life, a Jet Annual would still be published in the autumn for the 1971 Christmas market, while the name Buster and Jet remained in place until 9 June 1974.

Jet was one of several 1970s Fleetway/IPC titles cancelled after 22 issues (as were Thunder, Tornado and Starlord); long-serving editor Barrie Tomlinson stated that with the technology of the time it took 22 weeks for meaningful sales trends to emerge and for crude market research on the title to be analysed. The method was known within the company as "hatch, match and dispatch", and was instigated by managing editor John Sanders. New titles with fresh strips would be "hatched", features would be "matched" with the audience and then the comic would be cancelled and its popular features would be "dispatched" to another of the company's weeklies. The popularity of features was largely based on readers' letters; across the company's titles children were encouraged to write in with their top three favourite features of each anthology; those that scored well from new titles would be retained and those that did not were dropped. Strips that scored well from new titles continued after the incorporation with another comic, replacing that publication's underperformers. The subsequent merged publication would typically then receive a considerable boost in sales. Sanders has defended this model, citing the cost of around £30,000 to launch a new title as proof they were not designed to fail, pointing to the commercial success of the process and noting staff were never sacked or penalised for a failed title but simply moved to other comics in the company.

In 2016 Jet was among the titles post-1970 IPC/Fleetway titles purchased from Egmont Group by Rebellion Developments. As such several characters from Jet went on to play a prominent role in the 'Rebellion-verse' crossover property The Vigilant, while compilations of material featuring some of the stories from Jet have been published under the Treasury of British Comics imprint.

== Stories ==
Due to its short length, Jet had a largely consistent run of strips; only one started after the first issue.

=== Adare's Anglians ===
After a freak own goal leaves England out of qualifying for the World Cup, the strange old-fashioned remote dominion of New Anglia offers to qualify on their behalf. Their Edwardian throwback behaviour and manners draw some mockery, but the close-knit team enjoy surprising success on the field.

=== Bala the Briton ===
Ancient British warrior Gods send the valiant Bala to undertake a perilous quest to find his missing father Haral and his crew. He is helped by a small, loyal crew including a mystic known as the Roon.

=== Bertie Bumpkin ===
Artist: Terry Baye

Friendly yokel Bertie and his friends' country-ways trip up passing city slickers.

- Cartoon strip.

=== Carno's Cadets ===
Artist: Francisco Solano López

At Redburn Military School, Australian Lance-Corporal Fred Carno is given command of an oddball section of cadets - Gus MacGregor, Duffy Lewis, Welshman Taff Morgan, Gurkha Peerak, Mick O'Malley, and Indian heir Sadra Chand - who unwittingly stumble across an alien brain planning to invade Britain.

=== Crazy Car Capers ===
Artist: Francisco Solano López

Four British drivers - Englishman Bulldog Brown, Scotsman Mac MacIntosh, Welshman Dai Williams and Irishman Paddy O'Toole - compete for the Crazy Car Championship and a £100,000 prize, despite the attempted disruption of Eastern European nation Mundavia and their catspaw Colonel Kutch.

=== The Dwarf ===
Artist: Tom Kerr

Diminutive criminal genius the Dwarf commits audacious crimes to cement his status as the king of the London underworld, while Superintendent Smarmy of Scotland Yard tries to bring him to justice.

- Unlike the other strips, "The Dwarf" debuted in the second issue of Jet, dated 8 March 1971. The character later appeared as one of the villains in The Vigilant.

=== Faceache ===
Artist: Ken Reid

Ricky Rubberneck has the ability to "scrunge" his face into a wide variety of strange expressions, which he uses in a variety of scrapes.

- Cartoon; continued in Buster. All of the Jet strips and the Buster and Jet up until 24 March 1973 were collected in the hardback Faceache Vol. 1 - The First Hundred Scrunges as part of Rebellion Developments' Treasury of British Comics series, with an Alan Moore introduction.

=== Kester Kidd ===
Having grown up as a boy shepherd in a rural area, Kester Kidd has supreme speed and endurance. He is spotted by trainer Barney Grumshott, who hopes to turn the boy into a world class sportsman. However, sports director Doktor Mutter of the Republic of Spotzania hope to thwart the pair's plans.

=== The Kids from Stalag 41 ===
Artists: Mike Lacey, Toni Goffe

Kommandant of Stalag 41 should be an easy job for Kolonel Klaus Schtink, as the camp consists only of captured British boys. However, a gang of his inmates - Winston, Muscles Miller, Nipper Long, Judge Jenkins and Danger Bell - make his life a living hell.

- Cartoon, printed in full colour on the centre pages. Continued in Buster.

=== Paddy McGinty's Goat ===
Artist: Geoff Jones

A shape-shifting alien from the planet Ven arrives in the Irish town of Boggymorra and befriends schoolboy Paddy McGinty. When not required to be something different he generally defaults to a goat and is nicknamed such by Paddy, and the pair get involved in numerous antics.

- The comic strip was inspired by the comic song of the same name, well known at the time due to the 1964 cover by Val Doonican. The character would later appear in The Vigilant.

=== Partridge's Patch ===
Artist: Mike Western

PC Tom Partridge transfers from the quiet backwater of Barnleigh to London, where his rural ways - particularly his use of loyal dog Patch - are initially treated as a joke, but their unconventional ways soon bring results.

=== Sergeants Four ===
Artist: Fred Holmes

A quartet of resourceful British Army Sergeants - Englishman Alf Higgs, Irishman Paddy O'Boyle, Scotsman Jock McGill and Welshman Taffy Jones - carry out vital missions behind German lines in World War II.

- Among the villains in the strip was the robotic Iron Major, who later appeared in The Vigilant.

=== The Sludgemouth Sloggers ===
Artist: Douglas Maxted

In order to promote the moribund holiday resort of Sludgemouth, a group of unusual fellows take part in various national sporting events.

=== Von Hoffman's Invasion ===
Writer: Tom Tully
Artist: Eric Bradbury

Imprisoned since the end of World War II, former Nazi scientist Doktor Von Hoffman is released from prison. Returning to his experiments, he is able to use his skills to enlarge insects and animals, unleashing the resulting giant creatures on present-day England in revenge for his fatherland's defeat. His first target is the village of Little Upton, where local boys Barry and Joey form the first line of defence against his monsters.

- Continued in Buster. Von Hoffman returned as a major villain in The Vigilant. The Jet strips and some from Buster and Jet were collected in the hardback Von Hoffman's Invasion Volume 1 as part of Rebellion Developments' Treasury of British Comics series.

== Title ==
- Jet 1 May to 25 September 1971
- Buster and Jet 2 October 1971 to 9 June 1974

== Spinoffs ==
- Jet Annual (1971)
