= Scream! (comics) =

British weekly comic

- The cover of Scream! from 21 April 1984. Art by Eric Bradbury.

Publication information
- Publisher: IPC Magazines
- Schedule: Weekly
- Format: Ongoing series
- Genre: Horror
- Publication date: 24 March – 30 June 1984
- No. of issues: 15

Creative team
- Written by: Gerry Finley-Day; Simon Furman; Alan Grant; Chris Lowder; Tom Tully; John Wagner
- Artist(s): Eric Bradbury; José Ortiz; Jesús Redondo; John Richardson; Jim Watson
- Editor(s): Ian Rimmer; Simon Furman (assistant editor); Barrie Tomlinson (group editor)

Scream! was a weekly British comics periodical published by IPC Magazines from 24 March to 30 June 1984. A horror comic anthology comic, the title lasted for 15 editions before being merged with another title, Eagle.

== Creation ==
Horror comics had a chequered history in Britain; the term was strongly tied into the salacious penny dreadfuls of the Victorian era. When the post-World War II American comic industry saw a drop in superheroes the horror genre output of EC Comics and their imitators led to a moral panic when imported to the UK, led by Eagle founder John Marcus Harston Morris. A year after Fredric Wertham's controversial study Seduction of the Innocent, British parliament passed the Children and Young Persons (Harmful Publications) Act 1955, under which the first prosecution occurred in 1970. The law effectively banned the sale of horror comics, effectively stopping importing of American comics full-stop. Instead, homegrown British titles gravitated towards war, adventure and humour, a combination that remained steadfast even when the Silver Age saw superhero sales rebound in America.

IPC were one of the biggest British comic publishers and in the 1970s considered a horror anthology named Scream at the potential gap in the market. Dummy copies were made of the title, which advanced enough that a full-length episode of planned dark fantasy story "Black Beth" was produced, drawn by Spanish artist Blas Gallego. However the company found themselves in the midst of controversy in 1976 when the influential Mary Whitehouse of the National Viewers and Listeners Association and the tabloid press were among the groups to criticise IPC's hard-edged Action. This culminated in managing editor John Sanders being criticised for his poor moral character by presenter Frank Bough on BBC1's flagship magazine show Nationwide, and any thoughts on a horror title were shelved.

Long after the controversy had died down, the company explored the idea again in 1984. The success of 2000 AD suggested there was an audience for more mature comics, and boys ' adventure group editor Barrie Tomlinson was commissioned to put together such a title on the back of his successful relaunch of Eagle in 1982. As Tomlinson had a wide range of titles he was responsible for (including Eagle, Tiger, Roy of the Rovers and 2000 AD - though in practice he left the latter largely to the devices of Steve MacManus), he hired Ian Rimmer as editor. Rimmer in turn brought in Simon Furman, an aspiring copywriter in the competitions department, as his assistant.

The editorial approach to Scream! was to de-emphasise the horror label and deliberately not repeat the style of its more controversial precursors, making it more tongue-in-cheek for younger readers, as evidenced by its cover strap-line "not for the nervous". Like 2000 AD and Tornado the decision was taken to create a fictional editor-cum-host for the comic in the form of Ghastly McNasty. Rimmer devised the name after being inspired by a Liverpool band called Filthy McNasty. Ghastly's face was concealed by a hood, and a regular feature of the comic involved readers sending in drawings of what they believed he looked like, with any 'correct' entrants being rewarded with £50.

== Publishing history ==
Despite these attempts the tone was more horrific than Sanders had anticipated; he and the IPC board were wary of a repeat of the Action controversy, especially as the horror genre was closely linked to the video nasties outcry. Sanders was so shocked at the first episode of "Terror of the Cats" that he had writer Chris Lowder removed from the serial, which was instead hurriedly completed by Furman. Lowder subsequently left the comics industry. Furman also remembered that management were unhappy with the story and requested it be concluded swiftly while Tomlinson recalled he and Gil Page presented an issue to an executive only to see it "pulled to pieces".

Sanders would later recall the title attracted complaints from Liberal Democrat leader Paddy Ashdown, who sent him several letters of complaint - a year after the title had ceased regular publication. Ironically, Sanders felt the title perhaps didn't go far enough - he reminisced that focus groups felt the stories were tame compared to what they regularly saw on TV and video. He ultimately felt Scream! was a disappointment. Scream!, along with five other IPC titles, ceased publication was in response to an industrial dispute. Tomlinson felt the 1984 National Union of Journalists strike gave upper management an excuse to cancel Scream! after just 15 issues. He remained proud of the title, reflecting "people still talk about it now". As a result of the industrial action many of the strips were stopped at short notice instead of being brought to a natural end; Furman had produced a conclusion for "The Nightcomers" that was ultimately not used. Rimmer and Furman both left IPC to go freelance shortly afterwards; Rimmer would land a job at Marvel UK and later hire Furman to write for the company's licensed Transformers title in 1985, beginning a long association with the franchise for the writer.

Scream! subsequently merged with Eagle (#128, 1 September 1984) to form Eagle and Scream!, in which the series "Monster" and "The Thirteenth Floor" were continued. Max would eventually take over as 'editor' of the Eagle. There were also five seasonal Halloween specials released from 1985 to 1989, mostly consisting of reprints of horror-themed stories from IPC's back catalogue. This included the release of the "Black Beth" strip prepared for the mooted 1978 incarnation of Scream.

== Stories ==
=== The Dracula File ===
Published: 24 March to 30 June 1984
Writers: Gerry Finley-Day, Simon Furman
Artist: Eric Bradbury

The lead strip, about Dracula returning to hunt in 1980s England.

=== Fiends and Neighbours ===
Published: 24 March to 30 June 1984
Writer: Les Lilley
Artist: Graham Allen

A family of monsters live next door to an ordinary couple.

- Cartoon strip, originally printed in Cor!!.

=== A Ghastly Tale ===
Published: 24 March to 30 June 1984

Standalone horror stories introduced by host Ghastly McNasty.

- The stories were uncredited.

=== Library of Death ===
Published: 24 March to 30 June 1984
Writers: Barrie Tomlinson, Chris Lowder (under the pseudonym John Agee), Simon Furman, Angus Allan
Artist: Cam Kennedy, Ron Smith, Julio Vivas, John Cooper, Brendan McCarthy, Steve Dillon, Mario Capaldi, José María Casanovas, Steve Parkhouse, Rafael Boluda Vidal

One-off morality tales.

=== Monster ===
Published: 24 March to 30 June 1984
Writers: Alan Moore, John Wagner and Alan Grant (under the pseudonym Rick Clark)
Artist: Jesús Redondo

A deformed man ('Uncle Terry') who grew up locked in an attic inevitably escapes, tending to murder people he didn't like due to his inhuman strength and lack of social restraint.

- Continued in Eagle. Moore only wrote the first episode.

=== The Nightcomers ===
Published: 5 May to 30 June 1984
Writer: Tom Tully
Artist: John Richardson

A husband-and-wife investigator team are killed mysteriously at the haunted house Raven's Meet; their children Rick and Beth are drawn to the house to solve the mystery, and have unusual abilities themselves.

- Beth Rogan subsequently returned in "Rebellion-verse" series The Vigilant.

=== Tales from the Grave ===
Published: 24 March to 30 June 1984
Writers: Tom Tully, Ian Rimmer, Scott Goodall
Artist: Jim Watson

Short stories illustrating the depravity of Victorian era London.

=== Terror of the Cats ===
Published: 24 March to 28 April 1984
Writers: Chris Lowder (under the pseudonym John Agee), Simon Furman
Artist: John Richardson

An ill-fated experiment to harness the psychic energy of cats results in local felines becoming enraged and attacking people in a small town.

=== The Thirteenth Floor ===
Published: 24 March to 30 June 1984
Writers: John Wagner and Alan Grant (under the pseudonym Ian Holland)
Artist: José Ortiz

Crazed computer Max in charge of an elevator in a 17-storey apartment building - when someone bad or evil steps inside, Max would take them to The Thirteenth Floor, a virtual reality where they would be tormented or killed.

- Continued in Eagle. Max subsequently returned in both revival material and The Vigilant.

== Spinoffs ==
- Scream! Holiday Special (4 issues, 1985 to 1988)
- Scream! Spinechillers Holiday Special (1 issue, 1989)

== Revival ==
Rebellion Developments purchased the rights to the post-1970 IPC library in 2016, and editor Keith Richardson soon began looking at ways of reactivating the classic properties available. The first fruit of this was a joint Scream! & Misty Halloween Special in October 2017, featuring creators from 2000 AD and independent comics working on the properties. Many agreed due to their strong memories of the title and its characters; Guy Adams wrote a new story for "The Thirteenth Floor" and recalled Scream!'s "grimy, finger-staining sense of the illicit", while co-artist Frazer Irving noted the darker tone fitted in with his tastes at the time and interest in horror via video nasties. Irving would draw the nightmare sequences projected by Max, with veteran John Stokes drawing the 'normal' pages on either side. The other Scream! feature revived for the special was "The Dracula File", written by Grainne McEntee and drawn by Tristan Jones.

The special caused a minor controversy; due to the Scream! logo being larger on the cover of the special, Misty creator Pat Mills complaining it made the title seem like a "poor relation" and that Rebellion perhaps didn't understand the female market. In response, the 2017 special eventually had a Misty & Scream! variant made available, but only through specialist stores.

A second special followed in 2018; to avoid a repeat variant covers as both Scream! & Misty and Misty & Scream! were produced. Adams, Irving and Stokes provided another new Max story, while Alec Worley and DaNi provided a strip reviving "Black Beth", a character with whom the writer had become fascinated with after reading the 1988 Scream! Special. In 2019 the Halloween Special entirely focused on "The Thirteenth Floor". Richardson noted that one of the few complaints about previous specials had been the year wait between instalments, and the special - titled Scream Presents the Thirteenth Floor - was designed to rectify this. Adams, Irving and Stokes all contributed again, with Tom Paterson, Vince Locke, Kelley Jones and Kyle Hotz among the other artists featured. Scream! and Misty did return in 2020 and this time there would only be one version of the cover with the title given as Misty and Scream! with a separate Misty Winter Special 2020 also available. 2021 then saw what was marketed as a Scream! One-Shot Special in US comic book size under the title of Black Beth and the Devils of Al-Kadesh; this saw Worley and DaNi again return to the swordswoman.

The legacy of Scream! continues in the Treasury of British Comics Annuals, with both the 2024 and 2025 editions containing a new "Black Beth" comic as well as one Scream! one-shot comic reprint each. Both the 2024 and 2025 annuals have 2 variant covers, all of them having representation of "Black Beth".

A Scream! 40th Anniversary Special has been announced for 6 November 2024.

== Collected editions ==
Monster, The Dracula File, and The Thirteenth Floor have been collected in omnibuses by Rebellion Developments. They also issued both "The Nightcomers" and "Terror of the Cats" as a supplement packed free with Judge Dredd Megazine #417 in 2020.

Title	ISBN	Publisher	Release date	Contents
The Dracula File		Hibernia Books	March 2015	Material from Scream! 24 March to 30 June 1984 and Scream! Holiday Special 1985 to 1988.
Monster	9781781084533	Rebellion Developments	13 July 2016	Material from Scream! 24 March to 30 June 1984, Eagle 1 September 1984 to 30 May 1985, Scream Holiday Special 1986 to 1988
The Thirteenth Floor Vol. 01	9781781086537	Rebellion Developments	18 October 2018	Material from Scream! 24 March to 30 June 1984 and Eagle 1 September 1984 to 13 April 1985.
The Dracula File	9780785110798	Rebellion Developments	19 October 2019	Material from Scream! 24 March to 30 June 1984 and Scream! Holiday Special 1985 to 1988.
