= British girls' comics =

Comics intended for girls

British girls' comics flourished in the United Kingdom from the 1950s through the 1970s, before beginning to decline in popularity in the 1980s and 1990s. Publishers known for their girls' comics included DC Thomson and Fleetway/IPC. Most titles appeared weekly, with the content primarily in picture-story format. The majority of the stories were serialized, with two or three pages per issue, over eight to twelve issues. They were marketed toward young teen girls.

British girls' comics were often titled after common girls' names. Examples include Judy, Diana, Jackie, June, Penelope, Mandy, Tina, Sally, Tammy, Sandie, Debbie, Misty, Emma, Penny, Tracy, Suzy, and Nikki.

Long-running titles included Bunty, Mandy, and Judy (all DC Thomson) and Jinty, Misty and Tammy (IPC).

== History ==
=== Origin ===
Girls' comics were the natural evolution of a trend that started with story papers. As boys' story papers like The Magnet and The Gem gained readerships of young teens, publishers like Amalgamated Press looked to expand the market by producing story papers for girls. Titles like School Friend, Schoolgirls' Own, and The Schoolgirl, all launched in the period 1919–1922, established a girls' market.

By the end of World War II, story papers were phasing out in favor of comic books and television. The first girls' comics, Amalgamated Press' School Friend and Hulton Press' Girl, appeared in the early 1950s, with School Friend selling in excess of one million copies per week. (The School Friend comic was in fact the descendant of the School Friend story paper from the 1920s.) The girls' comics trend took off in the latter half of the 1950s, with the long-running titles Bunty and Judy, as well as titles like Boyfriend and Princess, all debuting in the years 1956–1960. (British romance comics, marketed toward older teen girls and young women, also flourished from the mid-1950s to the mid-1960s. Other than a few examples, however, romance titles had petered out by the mid-1970s.)

DC Thomson had published its first girls' magazine, Bunty, in 1958. The success of this title led the company to publish Judy, which was also successful: between them, Bunty and Judy achieved a circulation of over one million. DC Thomson went on to launch other similar titles in the 1960s, including Jackie (1964), Diana (1965), and Mandy (1967).

=== Industry consolidation ===
In the period 1958 to 1968, a series of mergers and acquisitions led to the girls' comics industry consolidating into two main publishers: DC Thomson and the newly created IPC. In January 1959 Cecil Harmsworth King, chairman of the Daily Mirror newspaper group, acquired Amalgamated Press. Within a few months he changed its name to Fleetway Publications, Ltd. Shortly thereafter, Odhams Press absorbed both Newnes/Pearson and the Hulton Press. King saw an opportunity in this to rationalise the overcrowded women's magazine market, in which Fleetway and Newnes/Pearson were the major competitors, and acquired Odhams. Fleetway took over Odhams in March 1961. In consequence, King controlled two national daily and two national Sunday newspapers, almost one hundred consumer magazines (including comics), more than two hundred trade and technical periodicals, and interests in book publishing.

In 1963 all the Mirror Group companies were combined by the creation of a parent (or "holding") company called the International Publishing Company (known informally as IPC). All of the existing companies continued to operate, but as IPC subsidiaries. When the dust cleared, IPC controlled five girls' comics titles — School Friend, Girl, Girls' Crystal, June, and Princess — while DC Thomson controlled three — Bunty, Judy, and Diana. (City Magazines was still in the mix as well, with their title Boyfriend.)

IPC set up a management development department in 1965 so that its various subsidiaries would no longer be in competition with each other for the same markets. This led to a reorganisation of the Group, in 1968, into six divisions, with IPC Magazines in charge of all comics content.

In the period 1960–1970, there were between seven and ten girls' comics in publication in the UK at any one time, with one estimation that the girls' comics market was larger than that of women's magazines.

=== "Hatch-match-dispatch" ===
The 1970s was a period of tumult for the British girls' comics industry. DC Thomson's Bunty, Judy, Jackie, and Mandy (as well as the "little girls'" comic Twinkle) continued strong through the decade. IPC, on the other hand, changed gears editorially — as writer/editor Terence Magee details, "Pat Mills and John Wagner [were brought in] to shake things up. The safe and gentle middle-class stories gave way to gritty, working-class yarns." The company introduced a slew of new titles, most of which lasted a few years before merging into other company titles — IPC's "hatch-match-dispatch" method. (Note: It was standard practice in the twentieth-century British comics industry to merge a comic into another one when it declined in sales. Typically, three stories or strips from the canceled comic would continue for a while in the surviving comic, and both titles would appear on the cover (one in a smaller font than the other) until the title of the canceled comic was eventually dropped.) Examples include Sandie (1972–1973; merged into Tammy), Pixie (1972–1973; merged into June), Lindy (1975; merged into Jinty), and Penny (1979–1980; merged into Jinty).

The IPC Fleetway stablemates Tammy (1971–1984), Jinty (1974–1981), and Misty (1978–1980) existed somewhat outside this trend, although in the end both Misty and Jinty ended up absorbed into Tammy (which absorbed four other titles during its run — Sandie, Sally, June, and Princess vol. 2 — before being merged itself with IPC's Girl vol. 2 in 1984). (Note: Tammy was intended to merge with Girl in the summer of 1984, but, according to the Grand Comics Database, "a printer's dispute in June 1984 prevented the final issues being published and it was simply cancelled. Girl did carry the Tammy masthead for several issues from 25th August 1984 but these issues contain no material from Tammy.")

By 1974, DC Thomson's girls' comics had fallen off somewhat — Bunty, Judy, Mandy, and Debbie had a combined circulation of 750,000 that year — but remained the market leader. At its height in the late 1970s, Tammy sold 250,000 copies per week.

=== Transition to slick magazines ===
Starting in the mid-1970s, IPC introduced a line of slick girls' magazines that downplayed the traditional comics content, instead featuring mainly product-related articles and photo comics. Titles in this line included Pink (1973–1980; merged into Mates), My Guy (1978–c. 2000), Oh Boy (1976–1985; merged into My Guy), Mates (1975–1981; merged into Oh Boy), Blue Jeans (1977–1991), and the second iteration of Girl (1981–1990; merged into My Guy).

Meanwhile, DC Thomson's girls' titles which had launched in the slick format in the 1960s, such as Jackie, continued in that format; and others, such as Diana (1965–1976; merged into Jackie) and Judy (1960–1991; merged with Mandy), changed to become slicks.

=== Decline ===
By 1980, there were eleven girls' comics titles in publication (not counting the slicks, which had much less comics content), but the last girls' comics of any note to debut happened in 1985: Nikki for Girls, which only lasted until 1989. Even DC Thomson's girls' titles fell victim to "merger mania": Mandy, which began in 1967, absorbed Debbie (which itself had previously absorbed Spellbound, published 1976–1978) in early 1983. Suzy (published 1982–1987) merged into Bunty. And by the time Mandy merged with Judy (launched in 1960) in 1991, that title had previously absorbed Emma (1978–1979) and Tracy (1979–1985).

By 1990, only four girls' comics were in publication, all published by DC Thomson: Bunty, Mandy, Judy, and Twinkle (the latter was a separate category of comics for "little girls"). The last girls' title, Bunty, was canceled in 2001.

=== Back catalog reprints ===
The Fleetway/IPC back-catalog is now owned by Rebellion Developments, which since 2016 has reprinted a number of Tammy, Jinty, and Misty serials, and is due to republish further series as part of The Treasury of British Comics.

In October 2017 Rebellion published a Scream! & Misty Halloween Special, which contained all-new stories featuring characters from those comics.

== Content ==
Girls' comics generally offered a mix of romance, pathos, school, and girl-next-door stories, thriving well into the era when consumer, fashion, and teen idol fare became popular in girls' magazines. The stories were generally moralistic in tone, with long-suffering heroines finally achieving happiness, while villainous relatives or girls who were liars, cheats, and bullies received their comeuppance. Also popular were stories of girls confronting adversity and overcoming it.

One of the earlier titles, Girl, founded by the Rev. Marcus Morris (with the close participation of fellow clergyman Chad Varah), was very much an educational magazine whose heroines, including those who got into scrapes, became involved in tales that had a moral substance. A considerable number of pages were also dedicated to real-life tales of heroic women in various fields.

Common girls' comics storylines included:

- orphans forced to live with cruel or uncaring relatives
- girls enduring blackmail, hardship, or unpopularity to protect a secret (often on behalf of their family)
- girls slaving for cruel employers or criminals
- saving animals from cruelty
- cruel factories, shops, boarding schools or workhouses
- heroines adopting masked identities to secretly help people
- spiteful girls causing trouble for an unsuspecting cousin, foster-sister or classmate
- girls becoming unpopular because events keep conspiring to make them appear jealous or selfish
- blundering girls getting into one scrape after another
- girls pretending to be disabled in order to take advantage of people
- girls who were put under a curse or came into possession of apparently supernatural objects which adversely affected their lives, but of which they were unable to rid themselves until they worked out how
- boyfriend-themed stories (by the 1980s)

The various strips in the girls' comics were usually broken up by letters pages, competitions, featured readers, puzzle pages, promotions, next-week previews, and advertisements.

Bunty's The Four Marys, drawn by Barrie Mitchell, was the longest serial in girls' comics, running from the magazine's creation in 1958 to its end in 2001. It centered on four young teens — each named Mary — in a girls-only boarding school in the fictional location of Elmbury, who often had problems with studying, staying alert, or helping the other girls and teachers. Of the four main characters, two were middle-class, one was the aristocratic daughter of an earl, and one was working-class, attending the school on a scholarship.

Three related Fleetway titles — Tammy (launched 1971), Jinty (launched 1974), and Misty (launched 1978) — had their own particular focus. Tammy concentrated on sadder Cinderella-themed stories and dark tales of tortured heroines. Many stories were full of cruelty and adversity, based on research showing that girls wanted stories that made them cry. Jinty concentrated on science fiction or otherwise fantastical stories. Misty concentrated on supernatural and horror stories, featuring plots such as "pacts with the devil, schoolgirl sacrifice, the ghosts of hanged girls, sinister cults, evil scientists experimenting on the innocent and terrifying parallel worlds where the Nazis won the Second World War." Writer Pat Mills, later to become famed for his work on 2000AD, scripted many strips for all three titles.

== Writers and artists ==
Despite the intended audience for the comics being female, the vast majority of the writers and artists responsible for the girls' comics industry were men. One notable exception was Marion Turner, who wrote hundreds of strips for DC Thomson's line, especially for Mandy, Judy, and M&J.

In general, artists and writers were not credited in girls' comics (or indeed most British comics of that era). As was common practice in the 1960s and 1970s, many illustrators were recruited via art agencies, including ones that specialized in Spanish artists (the UK was a popular market for Spanish artists as the exchange rate meant the work paid well) — notable Spanish girls' comics artists included Luis Bermejo, Purita Campos, Carlos Freixas, Jesus Redondo, and Jordi Badía Romero. Artists can sometimes be identified by their work in Tammy (which moved to a system of crediting creators in the early 1980s) or in boys' comics such as 2000AD, which brought in such a policy from earlier on. (Note: 2000 AD began crediting artists beginning with issue #36 (29 October 1977).) In other cases, it is possible to identify the artists from their signatures on the pages of the comics themselves. Identification of writers in girls' comics is currently dependent on information provided by the writers themselves.

=== Notable writers ===
- Ruth Adam — Girl (Lindy Love, Susan of St. Bride's)
- Angus Allan — Lady Penelope (various strips)
- Charles Chilton — Girl (Flying Cloud)
- Primrose Cumming — Tammy (Bella Barlow)
- Anne Digby — Tammy (Olympia Jones)
- Gerry Finley-Day — Tammy (The Camp on Candy Island)
- Scott Goodall — School Friend (some episodes of The Strangest Stories Ever Told)
- Peter Ling — Girl (Penny Starr, Two Pairs of Skates)
- Terence Magee — Tammy (Spartan School), Sandie (Slave of the Trapeze), Jinty (Merry at Misery House)
- Pat Mills — Tammy (Becky Never Saw the Ball, Thursday's Child, Glenda's Glossy Pages); Jinty (Girl in a Bubble, Land of No Tears, The Human Zoo, Concrete Surfer); Misty (Moonchild; Hush, Hush, Sweet Rachel)
- Frank Redpath — School Friend (Lucky's Living Doll)
- Betty Roland — Girl (Angela Air Hostess, Laura and the Legend of Hadley House, Pat of Paradise Isle, The Rajah's Secret, Vicky in Australia)
- Malcolm Shaw — Jinty (The Robot Who Cried); Misty (The Sentinels, The Four Faces of Eve, End of the Line); (Note: Shaw also edited Misty.) Tammy (E.T. Estate)
- Chad Varah — Girl (various strips)
- John Wagner — Tammy (School for Snobs) (Note: Wagner also edited Sandie and Princess Tina.)

=== Notable artists ===
- John Armstrong — Tammy (Bella Barlow); Misty (Moonchild), Girls' Crystal
- Jim Baikie — June (Gymnast Jinty, Tilly's Magic Tranny), Jinty (Left-Out Linda; The Kat and Mouse Game; Face The Music, Flo!; Ping-Pong Paula; Miss No-Name; Willa on Wheels; Rose Among the Thornes; Spell of the Spinning Wheel; Fran'll Fix It!; Two Mothers for Maggie; Wild Rose; The Forbidden Garden; Village of Fame; White Water; Left-Out Linda); Tammy (Glen — Lonely Dog on a Quest)
- Luis Bermejo — Girls' Crystal
- H. M. Brock — Princess (Lorna Doone)
- John M. Burns — School Friend (various strips), Girls' Crystal
- Purita Campos — Princess Tina (Patty's World)
- Evelyn Flinders — School Friend (The Silent Three)
- Cecil Langley Doughty — Girl (The Untold Arabian Nights), School Friend (Terry Brent)
- Derek Charles Eyles — Princess Tina
- Carlos Freixas — June (Angie’s Angel, My Family, My Foes!,Wild Girl of the Hills), Jinty (The Valley of the Shining Mist), Princess vol. 2 (Miranda's Magic Dragon)
- Phil Gascoine — June (The Twin She Couldn’t Trust!), Jinty (Girl in a Bubble, Fran of the Floods, The Green People, Gail's Indian Necklace, Badgered Belinda, No Cheers for Cherry)
- Harry Hargreaves — School Friend (Scamp)
- Tom Kerr — Girls' Crystal; Princess; June (Orphans Alone)
- Sean Phillips — Bunty; Judy; Nikki
- Jesus Redondo — Misty (Hangman's Alley, Amanda Must Not Be Expelled)
- Jordi Badía Romero — Misty (Wolfsbane, Hunt the Ripper, Screaming Point!)
- John Ryan — Girl (Lettice Leefe, the Greenest Girl in School)
- Ron Smith — Bunty; Judy
- John Millar Watt — Princess (Daughters of Adventure, The Scarlet Pimpernel)

== Notable examples ==
Title	Starting year	Ending year	Original publisher	Fate	Notes
School Friend	1950	1965	Amalgamated Press	Merged into June	
Girl	1951	1964	Hulton Press	Merged into Princess	Second volume runs from 1981 to 1990
Girls' Crystal	1953	1963	Amalgamated Press	Merged into School Friend	Numbering continued from a story paper of the same name, which itself had been continued from The Schoolgirl (dating back to 1922)
Bunty	1958	2001	DC Thomson	Canceled	
Judy	1960	1991	DC Thomson	Merged with Mandy	
Princess	1960	1967	Fleetway	Merged into Princess Tina. Had a second volume in 1983–1984 which merged into Tammy	
June	1961	1974	Fleetway	Merged into Tammy	Absorbed Poppet, School Friend, and Pixie
Diana	1963	1976	DC Thomson	Merged into Jackie	
Jackie	1964	1993	DC Thomson	Canceled	Fewer comics content than most other titles; no comics at all by the 1980s
Lady Penelope	1966	1969	City Magazines	Becomes Penelope; merged into Princess Tina	
Mandy	1967	1991	DC Thomson	Becomes Mandy & Judy; merged into Bunty	Continues as Mandy & Judy from 1991 to 1997
Princess Tina	1967	1973	IPC	Merged into Pink	
Tammy	1971	1984	Fleetway	Canceled (merged into Girl vol. 2 in name only)	Absorbed Sally, June, Sandie, Jinty, Misty, and Princess vol. 2
Jinty	1974	1981	Fleetway	Merged into Tammy	
Misty	1978	1980	Fleetway	Merged into Tammy	Concentrated on supernatural and horror stories
Nikki	1985	1989	DC Thomson	Canceled	Featured the strip The Comp, which continued in Bunty after Nikki folded

== See also ==
- British boys' magazines
- Story paper
- Romance comics
- British comics
- Young adult fiction
- Shoujo manga

== Sources ==
- Freeman, John. "British Girls Comics: There Should Be A Book...," DownTheTubes.net (Aug. 27, 2020).
- Gibson, Mel (2003). "'What Became of Bunty?' The Emergence, Evolution and Disappearance of the Girls' Comic in Post-War Britain". In Styles, Morag; Bearne, Eve (eds.). Art, Narrative and Childhood. Trentham Books. ISBN 1-85856-263-5.
- Holland, Steve. "The Men Behind Girls' Fiction", Collecting Books and Magazines (2001).
- Newson, Kezia (2014). How Has The Pre–teen Girls' Magazine Influenced Girls From The 1950s To Present Day?. Issuu.
- Round, Julia (May 16, 2017). "Misty, Spellbound and the lost Gothic of British girls' comics". Palgrave Communications. 3 (1) 17037: 1–11. doi:10.1057/palcomms.2017.37. ISSN 2055-1045.
- Scott, Jenni. "Female writers in a girls’ genre," A Resource on Jinty: Artists, Writers, Stories (February 28, 2015).
