= Judy (magazine) =

Judy was the name of these magazines:

- Judy, a British satirical magazine, extant 1867–1907
- Judy, a British girls' magazine, extant 1960–1991
- Judy, a Japanese manga magazine published by Shogakukan, extant 1983–2008

== See also ==
- Aunt Judy's Magazine
