= Judy (girls' magazine) =

British girls' magazine

- The cover of Judy #1 (16 January 1960).

Publication information
- Publisher: DC Thomson
- Schedule: Weekly
- Format: Newsprint magazine
- Genre: School, Romance, Drama, Humour
- Publication date: 16 January 1960 – 11 May 1991
- No. of issues: 1,635
- Main character(s): Bobby Dazzler; Judy; Emma (from 1979); Tracy (from 1985)

Creative team
- Written by: Marion Turner

Judy was a British pre-teen and teen girl's magazine, primarily in comic book form. Judy was extant from 1960 to 1991. From 1991 to 1997 it was combined with another title in Mandy and Judy magazine. Judy was published by DC Thomson.

== Publication history ==
=== Background ===
DC Thomson had published its first girls' magazine, Bunty, in 1958. The success of this title led DC Thomson to publish Judy, which was also successful: between them, Bunty and Judy achieved a circulation of over one million. DC Thomson went on to publish other similar titles: Diana (published 1965–1976), Mandy (published 1967–1991), Debbie (published 1973–1983), and Suzy (published 1982–1987).

By 1974, DC Thomson's girls' imprints had fallen off somewhat (Bunty, Judy, Mandy, and Debbie had a combined circulation of 750,000 that year) but remained the market leader. Whether in imitation or not, British girls' magazines of this era typically bore a single female given name as title; besides the DC Thomson titles, other magazines were Tracy, Nikki, Sandie, Diana, Sally, June, Tammy, Lindy, Misty, and Penny.

=== Mergers ===
As was common in British comics of the period, it was standard practice to merge a comic into another one when it declined in sales. Typically, three stories or strips from the cancelled comic would continue for a while in the surviving comic, and both titles would appear on the cover (one in a smaller font than the other) until the title of the cancelled comic was eventually dropped. Judy was emblematic of this practice. It absorbed Emma in 1979 and Tracy in 1985; as a consequence, the title was known as Judy and Emma from issue #1027 (15 September 1979) to issue #1049 (16 February 1980), and Judy and Tracy from issue #1306 (19 January 1985) to some time before issue #1443.

Even though Judy had debuted earlier than Mandy, when the two titles merged in 1991, Mandy was listed first in the new merged publication. Mandy & Judy, also known as M&J, merged with Bunty in 1997.

== Content ==
Judy offered a mix of romance, pathos, school, and girl-next-door stories, thriving well into the era when consumer, fashion, and teen idol fare became popular in girls' magazines. The insouciant Bobby Dazzler was a recurring character.

Among the fare offered by Judy was stories of girls confronting adversity and overcoming it — for instance, Nobody Loves Dixie (1964) tells of a shunned girl who wins a trophy and rises from her wheelchair to collect it — or succumbing to it — for instance, in the harrowing Nothing Ever Goes Right (1981), the heroine, beset with poverty, orphanhood, and health problems, dies of heart failure while rescuing children from an abandoned house.

=== Strips ===
- Bess’s Secret Brother, written by Marion Turner (1984); reprinted as Her Brother’s Keeper (1990)
- Bobby Dazzler
- Bobtail the Beach Rescue
- Boomerang, the Horse that Always Comes Back
- Cold As Charity, written by Marion Turner (1986–1987); reprinted in Mandy & Judy (1994)
- Cybela, written by Marion Turner (1979–1980)
- The Honourable SJ
- Judy & Co. (1985–1991) — starring Judy, the "host" of the comic, and her schoolfriends Emma and Tracy, both of whom joined after Judy absorbed their respective titles.
- Marina and the Monster
- Nobody Loves Dixie (1964)
- The Nobody of the School, written by Marion Turner (1982); reprinted as The Veiled Lady (1988); reprinted as The Nobody of the School in M&J (1994)
- Nothing Ever Goes Right (1981)
- Patience in the Saddle
- Part-Time Supergirl, written by Marion Turner (1983)
- Petra the Party Maker
- The Princess Who Never Was, written by Marion Turner (1986)
- The Rivals
- Sally of Studio Seven
- Sandra of the Secret Ballet
- Supergirl — Jenny Brown (not related to DC Comics' Supergirl)
- Topsy and the Scientist's Secret
- The Unwanted Ones, written by Marion Turner (1980–1981)
- Where Is Melanie Forbes?, written by Marion Turner (1982); reprinted (1989)

== See also ==
- British girls' comics

== Sources ==
- Judy at the Grand Comics Database
- Mandy & Judy at the Grand Comics Database
