= Girl (British comics) =

Comics magazInes

- The cover of Girl issue 1, featuring Kitty Hawke and her All-Girl Air Crew, 1951

Publication information
- Publisher: Hulton Press, Odhams Press, IPC
- Schedule: Weekly
- Format: Ongoing series
- Publication date: 2 November 1951 – 3 October 1964
- No. of issues: 675
- Editor(s): Marcus Morris, Jean Crouch

Girl was the name of two weekly comics magazines for girls in the United Kingdom.

The first and more well-known volume was published from 1951 to 1964. It was launched by Hulton Press on 2 November 1951 as a sister paper to the Eagle Girl was very much an educational magazine whose heroines, including those who got into scrapes, became involved in tales that had a moral substance. A considerable number of pages were also dedicated to real-life tales of heroic women in various fields.

A second volume of the series was published by IPC from 1981 to 1990, during which time Dreamer and Tammy were merged into it.

== Original series ==
Like the Eagle, Girl was founded by the Rev. Marcus Morris, with the close participation of Morris' fellow clergyman Chad Varah. The lead strip was originally Kitty Hawke and her All-Girl Air Crew, drawn in full colour by Ray Bailey, about a group of women running a charter airline. The strip was not very popular — it was apparently felt to be too masculine — and it was moved to the black-and-white interior pages, replaced on the cover by the schoolgirl strip Wendy and Jinx, written by Michael and Valerie Hastings and drawn by Bailey.

Other strips included:

- Angela Air Hostess, written by Betty Roland and drawn by Dudley Pout (1958-1961)
- At Work With Janet — Fashion Artist, drawn by Marjorie Slade
- Belle of the Ballet by George Beardmore and Stanley Houghton
- Captain Starling by George Beardmore and Paddy Nevin
- Claudia of the Circus, written by Geoffrey Bond and drawn by T. S. La Fontaine
- A Cosy Christmas, drawn by Gerald Haylock
- Emergency Ward 10, based on the TV series, drawn by Eric Dadswell
- Flying Cloud, a western strip, written by Charles Chilton
- Judy and Pat, illustrated by Harry Winslade
- Laura and the Legend of Hadley House by Betty Roland and Dudley Pout (1954)
- Lettice Leefe — the greenest girl in the school, by John Ryan
- Lindy Love by Ruth Adam and Peter Kay (1954–55)
- Pat of Paradise Isle by Betty Roland and Dudley Pout (1953-1954)
- Penny Starr, written by Peter Ling and Sheilah Ward (1957)
- Penny Wise by Norman Pett
- The Pilgrim Sisters by George Beardmore and Hardee
- Prince of the Pampas, drawn by Dudley Pout (1961)
- The Rajah's Secret by Betty Roland and Charles Paine
- Robbie of Red Hall, drawn by Roy Newby
- Sally of the South Seas by J. H. G. Freeman and Dudley Pout (1961)
- Sumuna's South Sea Isle by Terry Standford and Paddy Nevin
- Susan of St. Bride's, series about a student nurse, by Ruth Adam and Peter Kay (1954–61)
- Susan Marsh by Ruth Adam and Peter Kay
- Tessa of Television
- Three Sisters of Haworth, bio of the Brontë sisters, written by Pamela Green and Kenneth Gravett, drawn by Eric Dadswell
- Travel Girl by Molly Black and Dudley Pout (1952-52)
- Two Pairs of Skates, written by Peter Ling and Sheilah Ward (1956–57)
- The Untold Arabian Nights by Geoffrey Bond and Cecil Langley Doughty
- Vicky by Betty Roland and Dudley Pout (1954-1958) — reprinted as Vicky in Australia in Princess Tina
- White Queen of Calabar, drawn by Gerald Haylock
- Yvette by Sylvia Little and Dudley Pout (1952)
- Your Pets by Barbara Woodhouse and George Howe

== 1980s series ==
Girl

Publication information
- Publisher: IPC Magazines
- Schedule: Weekly
- Format: Ongoing series
- Publication date: 14 February 1981 – March 1990
- No. of issues: 478

According to Jacqueline Rayner, writing about girls' comics in The Guardian, the second volume of Girl "was a stepping stone between the traditional 'picture-story papers' and . . . teen mags such as Jackie and Blue Jeans." It "had photo-stories, boyfriends, pop stars and problem pages, alongside its occasional illustrated story."

The IPC title Dreamer, which debuted on September 19, 1981, merged into Girl after Dreamer's May 15, 1982, issue. The merged publication carried the title Girl and Dreamer in the period 1982–1983 (issues 89 to 110 at least).

The fellow IPC title Tammy (launched 1971) was intended to merge with Girl in the summer of 1984, but, according to the Grand Comics Database, "a printer's dispute in June 1984 prevented the final issues being published and it was simply cancelled. Girl did carry the Tammy masthead for several issues from 25th August 1984 but these issues contain no material from Tammy."

In March 1990, Girl was merged into its fellow IPC title My Guy, which became My Guy and Girl for a period. Girl volume 2 published 478 issues.

=== Strips ===
- Diary of a Ballerina
- The Haunting of Uncle Gideon
- Patty's World by Purita Campos — continued from Princess Tina and Pink

== Sources ==
- Girl (Hulton Press, 1951 Series) at the Grand Comics Database
- Girl (IPC, 1981 Series) at the Grand Comics Database
