= John Armstrong (comics) =

British comics artist

- Died: 28 August 2018
- Areas: Penciller, Inker
- Notable works: Bella; Moonchild; The Silver Racer-back

John Armstrong (died 28 August 2018) was a British comics artist, best known for his work in Misty and Tammy, for which he drew the long-running strip Bella. Other strips he has drawn include The Secret Gymnast in Bunty.

== Biography ==
Although one of the few acknowledged artistic pupils at his infant, junior and secondary schools, John Armstrong's first proper art lessons were whilst serving in the Army, in the Far East. "To keep us occupied, art lessons were started in a deserted palace outside Rangoon; local people in ethnic dress posed for us," he recalled in 2003. "I still have portraits of Burmese and Indian women, and West African and Indian soldiers.

On leaving the army, this course and its artwork steered Armstrong to art school in Middlesbrough’s Constantine College. In five years he passed Intermediate Arts and Crafts and gained National Diplomas in Design in both painting and illustration – making me more qualified than any of the staff.

On the Principal’s advice he next did a year in Teacher Training College. The students used to take the bus to various schools for teaching practice. "Two characters who sold toy bows and arrows in the local market boarded the same bus and expressed their amazement that an aspiring teacher was always reading a comic," Armstrong recalls. "In those days “educationists” regarded comics as a subversive element.

On teaching practice I’d amuse the kids by drawing Tarzan a la Hogarth on the blackboard. The kids got to like me and would beg, “Don’t be a teacher, sir!” With this excellent advice and with my art school specimens I got my first job in a Newcastle Ad Agency, meeting with commercial artists for the first time – a daunting experience. I was astonished by the skill of the head layout artist who would simulate a brochure – photos, lettering, typesetting – all by hand using pencils, inks and water colour so that it looked exactly like the eventual printed article. Art schools knew nothing about such expertise.

After a year there Armstrong headed south and pounded the streets of London with a heavy folder filled with art school work. Using an A-Z and a Writers and Artists Year Book he visited about 40 studios, publishers and agents and eventually got a job in a studio opposite St Paul's Cathedral and soon got his first freelance commission from Putnams Education Department for a poetry book. Quite a lot of school book work followed.

Armstrong acquired an agent in London's Holborn one year later and soon got his first comics job, a ballet story for Girls' Crystal. It was girls comics from then on.

Armstrong regards his most notable stories as the strips he drew for IPC: Cherry and the Children, which ran for five years, and Bella, which covered ten years in Tammy. Bella was, it appears, the only character to get her own book at IPC.

Armstrong later worked on the girls title Misty, work he saw as a relief from trying to draw thousands of gymnastic poses without repeating himself. Misty was a success despite – or because of – its horror story content aimed at young girls.

After the demise of Tammy and Misty, Armstrong drew the comics version of the popular children’s school drama Grange Hill for a new magazine, BEEB, for about a year. He then began working for DC Thomson, doing colour work for the first time on several annuals and for Bunty covers – plus some horse stories, his original passion.

In recent years Armstrong has provided artwork for ice rink pantomimes while gradually reviving his oil painting skills, mainly doing portraits of skating friends.
