= Tammy (comics) =

British comics magazine

- The cover of Tammy #1 (6 February 1971), offering a free ring and bracelet inside.

Publication information
- Publisher: Fleetway Publications; IPC Magazines
- Schedule: Weekly
- Format: Comics anthology
- Publication date: 6 February 1971 – 23 June 1984
- No. of issues: 689
- Main character(s): Bella Barlow; Wee Sue; Bessie Bunter; The Storyteller; Miss T Misty; Pam of Pond Hill

Creative team
- Written by: Jenny McDade, Benita Brown, Gerry Finley-Day, Pat Mills, Malcolm Shaw, Ian Mennell, Alison Christie, Jay Over, Primrose Cumming, Anne Digby, Terence Magee
- Artist(s): John Armstrong, Mario Capaldi, Jose Casanovas, Tony Coleman, Diane Gabbott, Douglas Perry, Eduardo Feito, Giorgio Giorgetti, Juliana Buch, Miguel Quesada, Jaume Rumeu
- Editor(s): Gerry Finley-Day; Wilf Prigmore

Collected editions
- Bella at the Bar: ISBN 978-1781086254

Tammy was a weekly British comic for girls published by Fleetway in London from 1971 to 1984. Tammy was closely linked editorially with the fellow Fleetway titles Misty and Jinty (eventually absorbing both of them). At its height, Tammy sold 250,000 copies per week, more than popular IPC Magazines titles like 2000 AD.

Tammy's first editor was Gerry Finley-Day, followed by Wilf Prigmore.

== Publication history ==
Tammy published 689 issues from 6 February 1971 to 23 June 1984, at which point it merged with Girl volume 2. (Note: Tammy was intended to merge with Girl in the summer of 1984, but, according to the Grand Comics Database, "a printer's dispute in June 1984 prevented the final issues being published and it was simply cancelled. Girl did carry the Tammy masthead for several issues from 25 August 1984 but these issues contain no material from Tammy.") Other titles which had merged with Tammy before then include Sally, June, Sandie, Jinty, Misty, and Princess (vol. 2).

As well as the weekly comic, Christmas annuals were also published.

== Content ==
Every Tammy issue was a collection of stories, usually serial instalments, that lasted three or four pages. While there were similarities with its Fleetway stablemates Jinty and Misty, each comic magazine had its own focus, with Tammy being known for its bleak variations of Cinderella. Commenting on serial Slaves of Orphan War Farm, Julia Round says that the story is emblematic of Tammy's themes: "a working class heroine, constantly thwarted hope, and overt violence against girls, usually from an older authority figure." Tammy sub-editor Pat Mills saw that weekly as being different from "nice", "middle-class" British girl's comics, like Diana and Princess Tina, that had come before. Many stories were full of cruelty and adversity, based on the understanding that girls wanted stories that made them cry. One serial that stood out to a number of reviewers was The Loneliest Girl in the World, with artwork by Jaume Rumeu.

Tammy's respective merges with Misty brought darker, horror tones, and the merge with Jinty brought more science-fiction. Despite these, changes in editorship brought Tammy to a more traditional mold in storytelling during the 1980s. The dark, cruel streaks that made Tammy so revolutionary in the 1970s had disappeared, except for Bella Barlow.

Tammy had more long-running regulars than most girls' comics due to the comic's respective merges. The Tammy and Sandie merger brought Wee Sue and Jeannie and her Uncle "Meanie" in 1973. The Tammy and June merger brought Bessie Bunter, Mam'selle X, and the Storyteller with The Strangest Stories Ever Told in 1974. The Tammy and Misty merger brought Miss T and Misty herself to join the Storyteller, in 1980. The Tammy and Jinty merger brought Pam of Pond Hill in 1981.

== Creators ==
=== Attribution ===
In a move unusual for girls' comics, artists and writers were credited in the pages of Tammy (although only its last few years). (2000 AD, in contrast, had included credits from issue #36, 29 October 1977.)

=== Artists ===
Artists featured in the pages of Tammy included John Armstrong, who drew the long-running character Bella Barlow. Others included Mario Capaldi, Jose Casanovas, Tony Coleman, Diane Gabbott, Douglas Perry, Eduardo Feito, Giorgio Giorgetti (Belinda Bookworm; The Cat Girl; Jump, Jump, Julia; Sister in the Shadows; Star Struck Sister; Witch Hazel), Juliana Buch, and Miguel Quesada.

=== Writers ===
Writers featured included Jenny McDade, who wrote Star Struck Sister, the first Bella Barlow story and Come Back, Bindi; Benita Brown, who wrote the science fiction story Tomorrow Town; Gerry Finley-Day, who wrote The Camp on Candy Island; Maureen Spurgeon, who wrote the Molly Mills stories; Pat Mills, who wrote Granny's Town, Thursday's Child and Glenda's Glossy Pages; Malcolm Shaw, who wrote E.T. Estate; Ian Mennell, who wrote Namby Pamby and Cuckoo in the Nest; Alison Christie, who specialised in heart-tugging stories such as A Gran for the Gregorys and Cassie's Coach; Jay Over, who wrote Slave of the Clock and Pam of Pond Hill from the Jinty merger; Primrose Cumming, who wrote the later Bella Barlow stories; and Anne Digby, who wrote Olympia Jones; Terence Magee, who wrote The Four Friends at Spartan School, The Witch of Widecombe Wold and Sally in a Shell.

== List of strips and stories ==
- All Eyes on 3E (illustrated by Mario Capaldi) — Muriel Monitor is making a film about Form 3E. High comedy ensues as Muriel tries to expose 3E for the bunch of cheats and skivers they are.
- Amanda Must Not Be Expelled (illustrated by Jesus Redondo) - Amanda Blay has deliberately got herself expelled from every boarding school she has attended. When her parents send her to Haybury Boarding School, Jane and Marty realise they won't win the inter-school gymnastics trophy without her. It isn't long before Amanda is up to her tricks to get herself expelled from Haybury. But Jane and Marty don't want her expelled, so they do everything they can to foil her.
- Aunt Aggie (written by Pat Mills, drawn by J Badesa) - Aunt Aggie is the star of a famous down to earth chat show and famous for her kind, generous personality and helping people. However, her adopted daughter Helen Gray knows all too well that off-screen, Aunt Aggie is a hard-hearted, selfish, scheming woman, who only gets involved in charity events in order to turn the event to her own advantage. However, Helen always manages to thwart those schemes and give Aggie's would-be-victims the last laugh without them even realising it.
- Babe of St Woods (illustrated by Jose Casanovas) - "Babe," daughter of a gangster, is sent to St Woods to learn social graces. Instead, Babe is turning her gangster background to fixing bullies, helping her friends out of trouble and even catching criminals.
- Backhand Play (written by Ian Mennell, drawn by Phil Gascoine) - Teri Knightly joins a tennis club and finds a special talent for backhand. But her roguish uncle keeps interfering, with his own brand of "backhand."
- Back-Stab Ballerina (drawn by Miguel Quesada) — Rita Radley secretly makes trouble for her old friend June Day when they go to ballet school.
- Ballerina in Blue Jeans (drawn by Juan Escandell Torres)
- The Ballet in the Back Streets (drawn by Miguel Quesada)
- Beatie Beats ‘em All (illustrated by John Armstrong) - Cockney orphan Beattie lives alone with many stray cats, while competing in various sporting events to make a living.
- Becky Never Saw the Ball (by Joe Collins) — aspiring tennis star Becky Bates is making a comeback after going blind.
- Belinda Black-Sheep (illustrated by Mario Capaldi) - Belinda McRea and her father become outcasts in their fishing village after Dad commits a seeming act of cowardice that led the deaths of his fellow fishermen in a storm. But did he really? Or did he lose his mind in some way and was not responsible for his actions?
- Belinda Bookworm (illustrated by Giorgio Giorgetti) - Belinda Binder is tired of being a bookworm and wants to become a sports champion.
- Bella Barlow (initially written by Jenny McDade, later by Primrose Cumming; illustrated by John Armstrong) - Bella Barlow slaves away cleaning windows for her uncle's business and doing all the housework on poor feeding and occasional beatings. However it won't stop Bella's passion for gymnastics and she snatches every moment she can to practise.
- Bessie Bunter (by Ron Clark and Arthur Martin) — about a pupil of Cliff House School, a fictional girls' school near Greyfriars School. Bessie is essentially a female counterpart to her brother Billy, sharing many characteristics with her brother, including her large size and large appetite. As unappealing as her brother, Bessie is conceited, untruthful, gluttonous and obese, but is rather more domineering than him and usually imposes her will by nagging, or, in the case of her brothers, by administering hefty slaps to the head. Continued from June (from 1974)
- Betta to Lose (illustrated by Tony Coleman) - Betta James is the school sports star but finds no joy in it. Her win-crazy headmistress has her whole life revolving around sport and Betta has no life of her own. So Betta starts throwing sports events to escape sports slavery.
- The Black-and-White-World of Shirley Grey (drawn by Diane Gabbot) - Shirley blames herself for her friend Trisha's accident because she lied about Trisha's whereabouts — although she did this at Trisha's request. Shirley vows never to lie again, but takes it to the extremes of refusing to tell even a white lie, and this getting her into terrible trouble.
- The Breaking of Faith (illustrated by Giorgio Giorgetti) - Faith Adams values her new friend Claire Ellerman as she doesn't make friends easily. However, her classmates keep telling her Claire is no good. Is Faith's new friend what she appears to be?
- A Bus in the Family (illustrated by Giorgio Giorgetti) - Mr Banks buys a bus, but criminals want it for unknown reasons. They end up pursuing it across the Continent when it goes on a school trip.
- The Button Box (created by Alison Christie, written by Ian Mennell and Linda Stephenson) - The button box is a Jackson family heirloom, and every single button in the box has a tale to tell. When Beverley "Bev" Jackson becomes unable to walk after a road accident, Gran gives her the box so Bev can use the stories to occupy her mind and cheer herself up whenever she is feeling down. Bev knows all the stories by heart and every week she dips into the box for a story to tell.
- C.L.A.R.A. (illustrated by Giorgio Giorgetti) - Professor Crichenor offers the services of his computer C.L.A.R.A. (Crichenor's Learning And Reasoning Aid) to raise the falling academic and sporting performance of Glumthorpe Comprehensive. Although the PTA's response is to throw Crichenor out – literally – he intends to prove himself by making Frances Cummins more organised.
- The Camp on Candy Island (written by Gerry Finley-Day, illustrated by Douglas Perry) — The holiday camp of Candy Island progressively turns into a prison camp — complete with striped uniforms, numbers, watchtowers, fences and chain gangs.
- Carol in Camelot Street (illustrated by Douglas Perry) - Carol Clancy finds King Arthur is being taken a bit far at her new school in Camelot Street. Her school carries on the Round Table and the Camelot tradition, complete with quests and defending the weak and poor against fairytale threats of dragons, ogres, robber barons and such.
- Cassie's Coach (written by Alison Christie) - Cassie Lord and her siblings are thrown out of their home when their mother is wrongly imprisoned in Victorian times. They find a new home — an old coach.
- Castaways on Voodoo island (illustrated by Ken Houghton) - A group of twelve schoolgirls from Oak Street secondary school win a TV quiz show, and their prize is a holiday in the Caribbean. When the teacher who was to accompany them falls ill, they are allowed to take the trip with no adult supervision. When a violent storm blows up, the plane then crashes near a desert island. Now the girls must try to survive, and avoid the strange voodoo tribe which haunts the island.
- The Cat Girl (illustrated by Giorgio Giorgetti) - Cathy Carter's father is a slightly scatterbrained private detective. While he is guarding a building where a break-in is expected, Cathy goes up to the attic to get a telescope to keep an eye on him. While looking for it, she trips over a casket which had been given to her father as a present from a grateful witch doctor in Africa. Inside is a strange costume, which gives her cat-like abilities.
- The Cat's Eye on Katy (illustrated by Douglas Perry) — Kathy Kerr falls under the evil spell of a cat sent by a vengeful witchdoctor.
- The Champion from Nowhere (illustrated by Tom Hurst) - an aspiring tennis star loses her memory, leaving her open to exploitation
- Cinderella Spiteful (illustrated by Jose Casanovas) - Cousins Emma and Angela are having problems with their relationship. Orphan Emma resents being taken in by her affluent London relatives, and acts against what she sees as Angela's smugness with petty acts of spite.
- Cindy of Swan Lake (drawn by Ana Rodriguez) - Cindy Grey should be looking forward to pursuing a ballet career at ballet school. Instead she is fraught with worry over her beloved swan, Charlie, who is being poisoned by pollution. And her jealous rival, Zoe, is using this to her full advantage.
- Circus of the Damned (drawn by Diane Gabbot) — Ruthless ringmaster Yablonski is out to create "the greatest show on earth" by blackmailing his performers into dangerous stunts.
- Claire's Airs and Graces (drawn by Hugh Thornton-Jones) - Claire Weston-Jones has her classmates thinking she has a more privileged home life than she actually does because she fears the derision of her more snobby classmates if they discover the truth.
- The Clock and Cluny Jones (written by Bill Harrington, illustrated by John Armstrong) - Bully Cluny Jones finds herself on the receiving end when she inherits a grandfather clock. When the clock strikes thirteen, Cluny is pitched into a harsh parallel world, where she's the victim, her kind-hearted aunt is a tyrant, and she is the "swot" of the school. But things don't end there. The world she has been pitched into is different in many ways, and circumstances lead to her being sent to a tough women's prison. Who can save her?
- The Clothes Make Carol (illustrated by John Armstrong) - Carol Carter is nicknamed "Scarecrow" because of her scruffy clothes, which she has to wear because her uncle and aunt give all the best to her cousin Sheila. Then Carol is given a magnificent blazer that's giving her confidence.
- Come Back, Bindi (written by Jenny McDade) - Jane Forrest is in a coma and doctors believe only her dog Bindi can wake her. But Bindi blames herself for Jane's condition and has disappeared.
- Common Cathy (illustrated by John Armstrong) - Cathy Sampson wants to pursue athletics, but her horrible parents keep blocking her by lies, deceit, and stealing the money for Cathy's entrance fees from her coach Mrs Mirren.
- Cora Can't Lose (drawn by Juliana Buch) - Cora Street goes on an obsessive binge to win as many sports trophies as she can, in order to win her parents' respect. Danger looms when Cora suffers a head injury which will kill her unless she has an operation, but she is so obsessed with winning trophies that she ignores the warning signs. (The story was never completed, due to the penultimate episode appearing in the last ever issue of Tammy).
- Courier Carol (drawn by Jean Sidobre) - Carol Jones' Uncle Ebenezer runs a one-man coach tour business. In order to save the business, Carol persuades him to do a tour of Europe in his old fashioned coach.
- Crawl, Carrie, Crawl (drawn by Juan Escandell Tores) - Carrie Smith is despised as a crawler at school because of the tactics she uses, including sucking up to the new strict teacher, to keep out of detention. But the reason is she can't afford detention – she has to run swimming lessons before and after school to keep her parents afloat while Dad is jobless. On top of that she has a sprained back but is not seeking treatment because she doesn't want to worry her parents.
- Cross on Court (written by Gerry Findley-Day) - a tennis player with temper trouble.
- Crystal who Came in from the Cold (illustrated by Douglas Perry) — Crystal, a girl found frozen in ice in the Arctic, is brought back to Britain and mysteriously brings the Arctic cold back with her.
- Cuckoo in the Nest (written by Ian Mennell) - A unique story in the history of girls' comics in that the main character is a boy who must pretend to be a girl. Leslie Dodds is constantly showered with treats by his Uncle Fred, but the money comes from Great-Aunt Hermione who expects the money to be paid on Leslie's school fees at Nesterfield, "the Nest". When Fred learns Hermione is going to visit Leslie at Nesterfield at the end of term, he must now enrol Leslie at Nesterfield or go to prison when his misappropriation is discovered. Unfortunately, Hermione thinks her nephew is a niece called "Lesley", and Nesterfield is a girls' school! So Uncle Fred disguises Leslie as a girl, and for a whole term Leslie must pass himself off as such. Can he pull off the deception, in spite of his boyish ways?
- Cut-Glass Crystal (illustrated by Douglas Perry) - Crystal Manners has lived the good life until her father's business crashes. She now has to adapt to a different way of life.
- The Dance Dream (drawn by Douglas Perry) — In 1938, orphan Diana Watts dreams of becoming a ballerina and she idolises famous ballerina Diana Oberon. She has moved to London to get close to Oberon and whenever she sees Oberon it seems like Oberon acts like a spiritual guide and mentor to Watts, offering encouragement and help, no matter how hard things get.
- Dancer Entranced (illustrated by Angeles Felices) - Trina Carr's father is eager to see her follow in the footsteps of her mother, a famous ballerina. However, Trina believes she has the talent of a "fairy elephant" — until she meets a hypnotist (in fact, a charlatan).
- Danger Dog (illustrated by Julio Bosch) - Beth Anderson rescues her dog, Sammy, when he is mistakenly taken to a research station for experimentation. Her parents insist on returning Sammy, fearing he is somehow contaminated and a danger to people. Beth runs away with Sammy, determined to prove them wrong. But then, weird things start happening to her sight, hearing and muscles. Beth finally realises her parents are right — Sammy IS dangerous. What is she to do?
- Dara into Danger (drawn by Juan Garcia Quiros) - Dara Grant and her ski team are kidnapped by the mysterious Madame Jensen and taken on a bizarre mission to the Antarctic.
- Daughter of the Desert (illustrated by Mario Capaldi) - when an Arabian princess enrols at Greenfields boarding school, the school mysteriously transforms into a desert pattern.
- Daughter of the Regiment (illustrated by Mario Capaldi) - Tessa Mason's father has been executed for cowardice in the Charge of the Light Brigade. Tessa is out to clear his name but a Mr Cregan keeps blocking her.
- Dawn and Kerry Double for Trouble (written by Maureen Spurgeon, drawn by Giorgio Letteri) - Dawn and Kerry always land in a mystery they have to solve.
- The Destiny Dolls (illustrated by Tony Coleman) - Miss Armitage uses voodoo dolls to get revenge on Friendly Lane, which had not been friendly to her when she lived there. As might be expected, her revenge goes too far.
- Different Strokes (written by Charles Herring, illustrated by Santiago Hernandez) - The only thing twins Jackie and Samantha share is their deep, even bitter, rivalry. However, Tracey is determined to bring the twins together.
- Dog Paddle Doris (written by Maureen Spurgeon, drawn by Carlos Prunes) - Doris Farrell is making her name as the best dog paddle swimmer around.
- Donna Ducks Out (drawn by Diane Gabbot) — Donna Desmond can't swim. Then a bathroom duck somehow gives her the ability.
- Double - or Nothing! (drawn by Diane Gabbot) — Kate Winter is a tennis player who can't keep a tennis partner because of her foul temper. She finally finds one in Pam Doggett, the granddaughter of the tennis club's charlady.
- Down-to-Earth Blairs (illustrated by Jose Casanovas) - Betsy Blair's father is opting for "The Good Life", living off the land and bartering, after being made redundant. Betsy is finding the change very hard and demeaning when she has been used to such a posh, comfortable life.
- The Dragon of St George's (illustrated by Douglas Perry) - about an army sports mistress who runs athletics military style at a boarding school.
- A Dream For Yvonne (illustrated by Miguel Quesada) — Yvonne Laroon comes from a long line of circus performers and her family takes it for granted she will follow in their footsteps. But ever since Yvonne saw Swan Lake on television, she has had other ideas – to become a ballerina. She certainly has talent for it, thanks to her acrobatic circus skills, but her parents do not approve. Yvonne comes across Alexia Company Ballet School and climbs up onto the roof to take a look at a lesson, only to end up crashing through the roof. She is mistaken for a new girl they were expecting, and is accepted into the school. But as her parents still won't hear of her becoming a ballerina, she runs away from the circus to the school. She decides to keep her circus origins secret, fearing expulsion because of it.
- Dulcie Wears the Dunce's Hat (illustrated by Mario Capaldi) — Dulcie Dobbs is obliged to wear the dunce's hat, but she is not a dunce. Her poor school work is in fact the handiwork of troublemakers in her class. Meanwhile, Dulcie develops a curious love/hate relationship with her hat. While it shames and embarrasses her, she is finding 101 uses for it in helping others.
- Ella on Easy Street (written by Gerry Finley-Day) - Ella Rutt claims that she is forced to do all the housework while her parents and sister just lie around idle. As a result, she is excused for her lateness, and has not bothered with homework in an age. The true picture is very different and, when her struggling parents aspire to better themselves and move house, Ella realises that her indolent, idle existence is at risk.
- Ella's Ballet Boat (drawn by Jim Elridge) - ballet on a barge.
- E.T. Estate (written by Malcolm Shaw) - Keats Estate is renamed E.T. Estate after it is badly hit by a meteorite shower. However worse is to come — the shower was the launch of an alien invasion. Jenny Holmes is the only one who knows about it, but nobody believes her. Can she foil the aliens single-handed?
- Eva's Evil Eye (written by John Wagner, illustrated by Charles Morgan and John Richardson) – Eva Lee is being bullied because she is a gypsy. She pretends to have the evil eye to stop the bullying, but things get out of control.
- Fairground of Fear (drawn by Diane Gabbot) — Julie Whitland discovers the new fair is not as fun as it seems. The clown is an ex-scientist who really hates her adoptive father for some reason...
- First Term at Trebizon (drawn by Phil Gascoine) — adaptation of the Anne Digby book.
- Foul Play (written by Ian Mennell, illustrated by John Armstrong) - Katie is badly injured at hockey. Her friends and family are convinced one of her own team fouled her, because they resented her as an usurper. Someone launches a vendetta against the team and Katie turns detective to find out who.
- The Four Friends at Spartan School (written by Terence Magee) - Judy Jenkins likes to play jokes to liven things up a bit. Unfortunately she keeps doing it in class, which gets her into the trouble that sends her to Spartan School, a special school run by Miss Bramble, designed to instil discipline into problem pupils. Unfortunately, Miss Bramble's ideas of discipline include beatings, feeding the pupils poor food, and locking them in dungeons, the pillory, and even iron masks. But Judy refuses to be broken and her courageous defiance singles her out for the worst treatment.
- Gail at Windyridge (illustrated by Mario Capaldi) - Gail's father was sacked for nobbling a racehorse, and she is determined to prove him innocent.
- Get Your Skates On, Katie (drawn by Diane Gabbot) - Battered ice skates turn Katie Brown into a brilliant skater.
- Gina – Get Lost (drawn by Miguel Quesada) - Gina's cruel relatives the Randalls exploit her talent for making toys.
- A Girl Called Midnight (drawn by Juliana Buch) — Midnight Meredith is plagued by strange "moods" which cause her to wander off in a trance.
- A Girl Called Steve (drawn by Diane Gabbot(t)): Stephanie (known as "Steve”) travels to join her father at an archaeological dig. But even as she sets off, someone is trying to drive her away.
- The Girl in the Window (illustrated by John Armstrong) - Dale Rogers has an unusual friend — a window dummy that can come alive!
- The Girls of Liberty Lodge (drawn by Dudley Pout) - Hardington Hall is a very strict school, where pupils who infringe the rules are put through a show trial in front of the entire school, with Miss Steele the headmistress playing judge and prosecution. Sally Valentine, a new, young teacher speaks out against their cruel measures. She resigns before she can be fired, and takes the opportunity to start a different type of school. Miss Steele takes against Miss Valentine and Liberty Lodge, and the story then focuses on the rivalry between the two schools.
- Glen - Lonely Dog on a Quest (drawn by Jim Baikie) - June rescues Glen from being beaten by his cruel owner, but is told that she can't keep him, as the flat they are moving to does not allow pets. So June gets a week of bittersweet happiness playing with Glen before she has to leave him in the care of neighbours. However, as soon as she leaves with her parents, Glen escapes from the neighbours to follow, and travels around the country doing good deeds while trying to find her.
- Glenda's Glossy Pages (written by Pat Mills) - Glenda Slade is given a mysterious mail order catalogue. To her astonishment and delight, everything she marks in the catalogue turns up for real on her doorstep. And Glenda never has to pay — or does she? The glossy pages start causing trouble for Glenda.
- Goldie Alone (illustrated by Eduardo Feito) - Goldie Gibbs is living with a foster family, the Stringers, while her mother is in hospital. The Stringers are out to stop Goldie beating their daughter Emma at an ice-skating event. Goldie is resorting to secret skating at the rink, which starts stories about a "phantom skater" haunting the rink at night.
- Good as New (written by Maureen Spurgeon, drawn by Maria Dembilio)
- Goodbye, Jo...' (illustrated by Eduardo Feito) — Jo Dalby has been Dad's best pal, but now she is finding new interests.
- A Gran for the Gregorys (written by Alison Christie) - Ruth Gregory seeks a gran to adopt.
- Granny's Town (written by Pat Mills, illustrated by Douglas Perry) - A fanatical eccentric sets out to turn her hometown into a place where grannies rule and young people are banned.
- The Greek Girl (written by Bill Harrington, illustrated by John Armstrong) - Rose Banks has no confidence in herself, and it shows in her appearance (scruffy) and schoolwork ("appalling"). She wishes upon the statue of Penelope, the Greek goddess of confidence, to become more confident. Soon after, a girl and a cat who are dead ringers for the goddess and her cat come into Rose's life.
- Guitar Girl (illustrated by Angeles Felices) - Jacey Jones is determined to break into the music world with her beloved guitar.
- The Gypsy Gymnast (illustrated by John Armstrong) - Ann Rudge is tired of being overshadowed by her sister Kim. She adopts the persona of "the gypsy gymnast" to win a trophy, but she soon discovers her teacher has a double life as well — a sinister one.
- Halves in a Horse (illustrated by Eduardo Feito)
- The Happiest Days (illustrated by Mario Capaldi) - Only Sunny Smyles is merry at Sobersides School. The grim portrait of her Great-Aunt Aggie is casting a shadow of gloom over the whole school. Sunny must get rid of the portrait before the gloom sees the school close down.
- Here Comes Trouble (drawn by Luis Bermejo) — A comic strip about a trouble-making girl named Mitzi Trouble.
- Hidebound Hayley (drawn by Miguel Quesada) — a girl is forced to wear a strange harness-like corset.
- High-Rise Hazel (illustrated by Tony Coleman) - Hazel is keeping secret pets in her apartment, which forbids pets.
- Hit the Headlines, Hannah! (illustrated by Tony Coleman) - Hannah Hilton must hit the headlines as part of a wager and prove herself equal to her more successful sisters — but not if they can help it.
- A Horse Called September (written by Anne Digby, illustrated by Eduardo Feito) - adaptation of the Anne Digby book.
- I'm Her – She's Me! (drawn by Phil Gascoine) - Nice Paula Holmes and delinquent Natalie Peters swap bodies.
- Into the Fourth at Tebizon (drawn by Diane Gabbot) — adaptation of the Anne Digby book.
- It's a Dog's Life! (written by Alison Christie, illustrated by Phil Townsend) - Rowan is shoved around in the children's home. Her only friend is Riley, a mistreated mongrel from next door.
- Jeannie and her Uncle "Meanie" — continued from Sandie (from 1973)
- Jill's Only Joy (illustrated by John Armstrong) - Jill Carter is striving to be a ballerina, not only in the face of cruel step-parents but also because she wears glasses.
- Jolly's Hockey Stick (illustrated by Giorgio Giorgetti) - Jolly owns a very special hockey stick.
- Julie's Jinx (written by Nick Allen, illustrated by Julian Vivas) - Romany Julie Lee gives her friend Gloria a Romany charm, but her horse has been acting strangely ever since. Julie is trying to find a way to deal with the problem quietly while not knowing what to make of it herself. Is the gift really "Julie's Jinx"?
- Jumble Sale Jilly (drawn by Juliana Buch) - Jilly Burridge is struggling to be an artist in the face of a family who scorn such things and don't treat her so well either.
- Jump, Jump, Julia (illustrated by Giorgio Giorgetti) — horse-jumping story.
- Karina and Khan (drawn by Jordi Franch)
- The Lame Ballerina (drawn by P. Montero)
- Lara the Loner (written by Alison Christie, drawn by Juliana Buch) - Lara Wolfe has ochlophobia, the fear of crowds. Her phobia causes a string of misunderstandings which makes her very unpopular and earns her the nickname "Lara the Loner."
- A Lead Through Twilight (drawn by Douglas Perry) — Carol is going blind but won't say anything because she is afraid her uncle will send her away from her beloved home. She befriends a dog called Twilight, but there are some nasty people after him.
- Leaves in the Wind (illustrated by Veronica Weir) - It is autumn at Laurel and Hester's school, and the headmistress decides to cut down the trees in the school drive to make things more tidy. Laurel and Hester are upset at this and a lot of other people are too, but none more so than a strange woman who is obsessed with her love of the trees...
- Lights Out for Lucinda (illustrated by Ken Houghton) - Lucinda becomes trapped in a district where people still think it is World War II, due to her father drugging them so he may use them as slave labour.
- Lill Waters Run Deep (illustrated by Mario Capaldi) - Crafty schemer Lill Waters gets away with everything.
- Linda Left-Out (drawn by Miguel Quesada) - Linda is always being left out.
- Linda's Fox (written and drawn by Ron Tiner) - Linda Barnes' policeman father is imprisoned on the perjured testimony of a crooked policeman. Linda befriends a family of foxes who become embroiled in a train of events that lead to Mr Barnes' release.
- Little Miss Nothing (written by Pat Davidson, illustrated by Miguel Quesada) - Annabel Hayes longs to be a dressmaker, but is forced by her family to toil all day at her father's market stall, while spoilt sister Dora gets all the encouragement (and money) she needs for her modelling ambitions. When Annabel takes a risk by selling on the stall some handbags she has made, she receives the opportunity to work at a grand fashion house. However, the Hayes family do everything they can to sabotage things, while scheming to advance Dora's ambitions at Annabel's expense.
- Little Sisters (illustrated by Mario Capaldi) - The exploits of Carol and her kid sister, "Sam" (Samantha).
- The Loneliest Girl in the World (illustrated by Jaume Rumeu) - is Karen going mad or is the world around her?
- The Lonely Ballerina (written by Jay Over) — What's happened to the ballet teacher at Tall Trees Ballet School, a school now in shambles?
- The Lonely Dancer (drawn by Candido Ruiz Pueyo) - a promising ballerina is trying to find her missing mother.
- Lonely Romy (drawn by Luis Bermejo and Miguel Quesada)
- Lord of the Dance (drawn by Miguel Quesada) - ballet story.
- Lucky by Name (illustrated by Julian Vivas) - Lucky Starr blames herself for the accident that put her father out of work and turns to her show-jumping to raise money to cover the family's financial shortfall from his redundancy, but finds herself dogged by fickle fortune.
- Lucky by Name… (written by Malcolm Shaw, drawn by Juliana Buch) – A foal has mysterious powers.
- Lucky's Living Doll, later known as Lucky and Tina (illustrated by Robert MacGillivray) — continued from June (from 1974); originally from School Friend.
- Maggie's Menagerie (illustrated by Tony Coleman) - Maggie Crown has to live on her gran's houseboat, and gran does not like animals. So what is Maggie to do with her beloved pets?
- Make Headlines, Hannah! (illustrated by Tony Coleman) - Hannah Hilton is regarded as the failure of her family, who are a line of success stories. Then Great Uncle Matt, who is paying a visit, tells Hannah he will give her £100 if she can make a name for herself in the papers upon his return.
- Make Your Mind Up, Maggie (drawn by Juliana Buch) - Maggie has to choose between giving up riding or ballet. If she gives up riding, her pony will be sold to a cruel owner, but riding is bad for her ballet.
- Maisie of Mo Town (illustrated by Giorgio Giorgetti) - Later received a sequel, Maisie - Fashion Crazy.
- Maisie's Magic Eye (illustrated by Robert MacGillivray) — Gag strip about a schoolgirl who wears a brooch with magic properties.
- Mam'selle X (illustrated by drawn by Giorgio Giorgetti) — actress Avril Claire is not very popular in Occupied France, as she performs for the German troops. But what nobody knows is that she is in fact Mam'selle X, a member of the French Resistance — continued from June (from 1974); originally from School Friend.
- Mask for Melissa (illustrated by Angeles Felices) - Aspiring actress Melissa Mappin receives a facial disfigurement in a road accident. She resumes her career by hiding behind a facial mask and changing her name to Gaye Traynor. But the deceit is bringing its own problems – like not able to have people touch her face because they'll find out it's a mask – which leads to misunderstandings and unpopularity.
- Melanie's Mob (illustrated by Edmond Ripoll) - Melanie Newton hates her new snob school and the snooty girls looking down on her former lower class origins. She turns to secretly training a gang of rough girls as an athletics team.
- A Million Pounds to Give Away! (written by Maureen Spurgeon, drawn by Agustin Navarro) - Biddy Lenton has to give away her late great uncle's entire fortune (a million pounds) under the terms of his will, but it's proving harder than expected and it's getting Biddy into all sorts of scrapes.
- Miss High-an'-Mighty (illustrated by Julio Bosch) - Bill Fletcher, a convict made good, is taking a spoiled, arrogant Victorian girl named Ursula Thorndike on a tour to see how the other half live in the hopes it will change her. Ursula's had to agree, as it is the only way to save her family from bankruptcy, but so far none of it is making any impression or improvement on her.
- Molly Mills (written by Maureen Spurgeon) - In 1926, Molly Mills travels from the East of London to take up a maidservant post at the Devonshire home of Lord and Lady Stanton. On arrival, she inadvertently makes an enemy of the cruel butler Pickering and from then on endures all manner of hardship in her struggles to keep her job and send enough money home to her large family.
- Monster Tales (by various writers and artists) — tales of assorted monsters.
- Mouse (drawn by Maria Barrera) - Mary "Mouse" Mallone is kidnapped in a custody dispute. Her father belongs to a powerful Sicilian family who want Mouse for only one reason — an arranged marriage.
- My "Brother" George (illustrated by Mario Capaldi) — Giggles galore with Gemma and George the Gorilla. George has been humanised and thinks he is Gemma's kid brother.
- My Shining Sister (drawn by Douglas Perry) — The constellation of the Pleiades has suddenly vanished, and a mysterious glowing girl appears on Earth.
- My Terrible Twin (drawn by Juliana Buch) – Moira and Lindy are fraternal twins. Moira is plain, Lindy is beautiful, but Moira is the pleasant twin while Lindy is the problem one. So problematic, that she has been sent to a remand home for shoplifting. Now out on parole, Moira is faced with helping Lindy to rehabilitate, but her efforts to keep her sister out of trouble often end up with Moira getting into trouble herself.
- Namby Pamby (written by Ian Mennell) - Pamela Beeton has lived a very sheltered existence with her over-protective parents. This comes to an abrupt end when her reluctant parents are obliged to send her to school for the very first time. The overgrown baby must now learn to fend for herself.
- Nanny Young (written by Tom Newland and Maureen Spurgeon) - Tina Young is qualified as a nanny, but being "young" in both looks and name is proving a barrier to finding a job.
- Nell Nobody (drawn by Miguel Quesada) - Nell slaves at her uncle's hot dog stand. Can her skill with puppets turn the nobody into a somebody? Not if her cousin can help it.
- Neville's Island (illustrated by Douglas Perry) - Thirty girls from St Edburgha's are lured to a mysterious island by the mysterious Miss Neville, who plans to get revenge for the suffering she endured while she was at the school.
- Nina's Nightmare World (drawn by Mario Capaldi)- Nina West falls under the power of an evil locket she inherited from her late great cousin Eva.
- Nightmare at Grimm Fen (illustrated by Diana Gabbot) - Patty and Mark Stephens are enthusiastic brass rubbers. At Grimm Fen, Grimmford, they go to a 12th century church, St. Frideswide's, in search of brass rubbings. Inside the church they make a rubbing of an ominous-looking brass of a Frenchman named Robert le Mal (Robert the Evil One), which brings him back from beyond the grave. The ghost has powers over birds, animals, people, telephone wires and airwaves to spread his influence and make everyone do his bidding, and Patty, Mark and their father are being surrounded by it.
- No Haven for Hayley (illustrated by Mario Capaldi) - Mrs Moore's home is known as "the Haven" because she works so tirelessly for charity. Unfortunately Mrs Moore is so busy and over-zealous with charity projects that she is neglecting her own daughter, Hayley.
- No Hope for Cathy (drawn by Victor Hugo Arias) - Cathy is kidnapped and forced to impersonate a missing girl.
- No Love for Lindy (illustrated by Eduardo Feito) - Lindy Allen is fostered by the Westons but begins to wonder what their motives are.
- No Love for Liza (illustrated by Jaume Rumeu) - Liza Bruce battles to be an artist against the odds piled on by a nasty stepfamily.
- No Place for Children (illustrated by Eduardo Feito)
- No Use to Anyone! (illustrated by Eduardo Feito) - When Kirsty goes to live with farming relatives she doesn't seem to fit in or be useful for anything, and farm demands that everyone and everything be useful.
- Now You See Her... (illustrated by Mario Capaldi): Faye Fadden, a conjurer, is pursuing a missing girl, Soria Warniche, who has been teleported away to save her from a gang of criminals. The only clues to Soria's whereabouts are on Faye's charm bracelet, and deciphering their meaning is not straightforward.
- Nurse Grudge (illustrated by Tony Coleman) - Greta Jones becomes a student nurse at St Jane's Hospital, but although she wants to be a nurse her real motive is to take revenge on the staff she believes are responsible for her doctor father's dismissal twenty years earlier. Guiding her is her father's old diary, which got left behind when he vanished years ago, but it never seems to explain what he was dismissed for. Greta does not know either but intends to find out. She also befriends Old Fred, the hospital porter who, despite giving no sign he knows her game, seems to take odd actions that either protect her or foil her tricks.
- Odds on Patsy' (illustrated by Eduardo Feito) — race-horses.
- Olympia Jones (written by Anne Digby) - Horse rider Olympia Jones dreams of following in her father's footsteps and winning an Olympic gold medal for Britain. After her parents are killed in a crash she is reduced to animal trainer at Rotts' circus where she is exploited by Rott and his daughter Linda. Eventually the Rotts frame and dismiss Olympia for the ill-treatment Linda inflicted on her favourite horse, Prince, so they can escape prosecution from Animal Welfare. However, Olympia cannot abandon Prince to the mercy of the Rotts, so she runs away with him. Her adventures are only just beginning...
- One Girl and his Dog (illustrated by Mario Capaldi) - adventures with Kim and her big, dopey dog Rumpus, who are making their way to London so that Kim can claim an inheritance.
- The Outcast of Oakbridge (illustrated by Giorgio Giorgetti): Ella Hickey has a talent for netball, but training to beat the snooty Oakbridge girls could be awkward because of her mother's job at the school.
- "Our Janie" – Little Mum (drawn by Colin Merrett) - Janie Greaves is "little mum" to her siblings after her mother's death.
- Palomo (illustrated by Douglas Perry) - The story of a girl and her horse.
- Pam of Pond Hill (written by Jay Over) — Pam Watts brings us stories of what happened when she was a first-year at Pond Hill Comprehensive. These usually deal with bullies, problem pupils, teachers, family and friendship problems, brushes with the law, accidents and catastrophes, school trips, Christmas chaos, and even the occasional hint of the supernatural, all told in Pam's own words and her own language. Continued from Jinty (from 1981)
- Peggy in the Middle (illustrated by Tony Coleman) - Peggy is caught in a custody battle between her mother and her father and his new wife Mitzi.
- Plain as Pearl (drawn by Juliana Buch) - Pearl Kent has considered herself plain until she discovers that she has what it takes to be a model. She takes a modelling job to raise enough money to send her sick mother on holiday. However she must keep her job a secret from the people she is staying with, because their daughter will be jealous.
- Portrait of Doreen Grey (written by Charles Herring, illustrated by Tony Coleman) — Shy Doreen Grey has a portrait painted. Similar to the story The Picture of Dorian Gray, the portrait makes her more confident, but it is making her more unpleasant as well.
- Prince of the Wild (illustrated by Veronica Weir) - A girl befriends a wild horse.
- Proud as Punch (illustrated by Tony Coleman)
- Push-along Patti (drawn by Juliana Buch) - Patti Collins wants to be accepted into the biker club at her school, but they just tell her to "push along", initially because she has no bike, then because all she can get is a push bike.
- Queen Rider (written by A. D. Langholm, illustrated by Eduardo Feito) - adaptation of the book of the same name.
- Rae Rules OK (written by Gerry Finley-Day) - Rae has been a shy girl until she finds a mysterious ruler.
- The Revenge of Edna Hack (illustrated by Douglas Perry) — Actresses playing convicts on an island film set find themselves real prisoners.
- Rhona's Rainstones (illustrated by Douglas Perry) — Sacred stones will cause water-related disasters until they are returned to their rightful place.
- Rita, My Robot Friend (illustrated by Tony Coleman) - Lonely Jenny James finds herself a complete outcast at her new school because of her grandfather-scientist. Jenny's only friend is "Rita," a girl-like robot created by her grandfather. The whole story revolves around Jenny keeping the truth about Rita from her arch-enemy, Angelina.
- Roberta's Rebels (written by Maureen Spurgeon, drawn by Rodrigo Comos) - Roberta Russell decides she will do something about her hierarchal school system where the "Serfs" slave to the sporty "Supremos."
- Romy's Return (written by Charles Herring) - Linda has always been happy being second fiddle to her best friend, Romy. Then Romy moves and Linda becomes Number 1. She is determined to stay that way when Romy suddenly returns — even though it means playing tricks on Romy.
- Room for Rosie (written by Alison Christie, illustrated by Santiago Hernandez) - Pauline Wheeler is trying to find a home for her late gran's beloved pram, Rosie.
- Rosie of Ragged Row! (drawn by Diane Gabbot) — Rosie Fields, daughter of a rag-and-bone man, longs to get out of Ragged Row someday. Her chance comes when supernatural ballet teachers come into her life. In a sequel "Rosie at the Royalty," Rosie is admitted to a prestigious ballet school, but is constantly battling snobbish prejudice from both the headmistress and the pupils.
- Rowena of the Doves (illustrated by Peter Wilkes) - In medieval times, Rowena's father, King Guthlac, has dispatched her to fetch her brothers to help him face his old enemy, the Black Earl. Rowena's companions are her doves and her horse Silvermane.
- Running Rosie Lee (illustrated by Jose Casanovas) - Rosie Lee becomes a super fast runner once she's had a cup of tea, to the consternation of the snobs at her new boarding school.
- Run, Rabbit, Run! (written by Roy Preston, illustrated by Edmond Ripoll)
- Sadie in the Sticks (drawn by Juliana Buch) – The amnesic Sadie Wade's only joy as she slaves in the Scraggs' household and chip shop is a talent for making matchstick models - ironically, she has a fear of fire.
- Sally in a Shell (written by Terence Magee) - At Eastport holiday resort, the Shores run a deckchair hire business – with the younger daughter Sally doing all the work. Sally is the family drudge, mistreated and unloved by her father and her elder sister Dora. Sally has a talent to help keep her spirits up — making ornaments and jewellery out of seashells. She tries to keep it a secret from her abusive family and find ways to fit it around all the drudgery, hoping to make a living out of it in time and be able to leave her horrible home life.
- Sandy and Steve (drawn by Juliana Buch) - Sandy Rawlings meets her first boyfriend. Unfortunately her snobby father disapproves and keeps trying to pair her off with an incompatible boy.
- Sandy, A Girl Like You (drawn by Juliana Buch) - sequel to Sandy and Steve.
- Sara's Kingdom (illustrated by Bill Mainwaring) - In the Himalayan state of Hunzir, the dying Emir names the daughter of his sister Uzura as his successor. The Emir's friend Omar Khan heads off to Britain to search for the heiress, along with Mari who would be the princess' lady in waiting and advisor, while the Mir's evil cousin plots to waylay her so that he will gain the throne. The princess turns out to be Sara Nairn, who is at school in the Scottish highlands. After arriving in Hunzir, Sara is taught to be a ruler by the dowager Queen Shasti, who serves as regent until Sara is sixteen.
- Sarah in the Shadows (illustrated by Mario Capaldi) - In Victorian times Sarah is thrown out into the street after her unfortunate uncle is thrown into debtor's prison. All she has to survive on is her gift for paper cutouts and shadow play.
- Sarita in Uniform (illustrated by Diana Gabbot) - Romany Sarita attends school secretly because her guardians disapprove.
- Saving Grace (written by Ian Mennell) - Sue Blackstone returns from abroad to find her former best friend, Grace Clarke, has become the school bully. Why has Grace changed so much and can Sue save Grace from herself?
- School for Snobs (drawn by J Badesa) - The School for Snobs is a special school designed to cure girls of snobbery. The headmistress is Hermione Snoot, who wears a nightie and slippers with a mortar board, is seldom seen without a cigarette, and talks Cockney.
- The Sea Spirit (drawn by Juan Escandell Torres) - Sheena Barrett is a brilliant swimmer, but her fear of diving is a handicap. Then she meets Marina, a sea spirit who gives her the confidence to dive.
- The Sea Witches (illustrated by Mario Capaldi) - Kate discovers that a flock of geese called "the Sea Witches" are exactly that. The Sea Witches are angry with a military aircraft base because their noisy aircraft are disturbing their grounds. They are going to drown the base in a flood — can Kate stop them?
- The Secret of Angel Smith (written by Jay Over) - Abby Fox longs to join the family trapeze act, but her father doesn't want to lose her like he lost her mother. Abby is furious when another girl, Angel Smith, is hired instead. But there is something strange about Angel.
- The Secret Ballerina (drawn by Roy Newby) - Karen yearns to be a ballerina, but her aunt and legal guardian Edith does not approve of ballet, so she must practise in secret.
- Secret Ballet of the Steppes (illustrated by Douglas Perry) — Ballet pupils are kidnapped and taken to Siberia. They must dance for the last of the imperial rulers, who still lives in a pre-revolutionary lifestyle — but not for much longer. Continued oppression is fuelling its own revolution, and the dancers get caught right up in the conflict.
- Secret of the Skulls (illustrated by Mario Capaldi) - Prudence Sylvester and her pastor father reside in a small parish in London. A winter storm unearths a crypt in the graveyard filled with skulls. Israel Quist the parish gravedigger tells Prudence the story of the skulls. They are the skulls of witches executed by the parish witch-finder, and Quist is really Jacob Stave, the witch-finder's apprentice who buried the skulls in the crypt as an act of remorse. One of the two true witches burned in the witch hunt swore that the people of London would burn as she had. The Sylvesters' housekeeper Mrs. March is possessed by the spirit of the executed witch and seeks that retribution.
- The Secret of the Stables (drawn by Reginald B. Davis)
- The Secret of Trebaran (illustrated by Giorgio Cambiotti) - Trudy Smith is staying with her aunt in a desolate part of Cornwall. An encounter with a strange girl results in Trudy acquiring a magical medallion which enables her to travel back in time to 1671. She then gets involved in a fight against an evil sorcerer.
- Selena Sitting Pretty (drawn by Diane Gabbot) - Selena has always been top girl in class. But when her school combines with another, she comes up against serious competition for top of the class and can't take it. Then, by fluke, they see her in a wheelchair and think she has been in a road accident. All of a sudden the big fuss is pushing out her rivals and Selena thinks she has found the way to be sitting pretty at school again.
- Serfs of the Swamps (drawn by Douglas Perry)
- The Shadow of Sherry Brown (drawn by Maria Barrera) - Katy Bishop is adopted by the Browns — but the shadow of their late daughter, Sherry, is very jealous.
- Shadow on the Stage (illustrated by Tony Coleman) - An old theatre is converted into a stage school, named after an actress who died in mysterious circumstances. But when new pupil Jan Gregg signs up, she finds herself harassed by a shadowy figure in the old theatre. Is it a ghost? Is it someone jealous? Whoever or whatever it is, it's not merely out to get rid of Jan – it's out to kill her.
- Sheena, So Shy (illustrated by Tony Coleman) - Sheena Willcox is a shy, bullied girl who longs to prove herself and have a few friends. But her spiteful cousin Sabrina keeps sabotaging her every attempt.
- Sister in the Shadows (illustrated by Giorgio Giorgetti) - Wendy Weekes joins the school where her sister Stella was once the star pupil and now enjoys success as an actress. Her over-expectant parents and teachers expect Wendy to be living up to Stella's reputation. But Wendy is not an all-round winner like her sister and bullies start calling her "Weak sister Wendy."
- Sit It Out, Sheri (illustrated by John Armstrong) — Timid Sheri becomes more confident when she acquires a strange chair. Soon, however, the chair is giving Sheri the shivers.
- Skimpy Must Ski! (illustrated by Tom Hurst) - Skimpy Shaw wants to learn to ski.
- Skivers' School (drawn by J Badesa) - a special school teaches ill-mannered girls to behave.
- Slave of the Clock (written by Jay Over) - Allison Thorne is a talented ballerina but isn't dedicated. She falls foul of an over-zealous ballet teacher whose idea of instilling dedication is to hypnotise pupils into dancing whenever they hear the ticking of a clock.
- Slaves of the Hot Stove (drawn by Douglas Perry) - Carol becomes a victim of the Hot Stove — a top restaurant which kidnaps top cooks.
- Slaves of Orphan War Farm (written by Gerry Finley-Day, drawn by Desmond Walduck) - At a lonely farm in 1942, Kate Dennison and a group of war orphans find themselves prisoners of the evil owner, Ma Thatcher, and her cronies, and forced to work all day in a dangerous quarry while spending every night locked in a barn. Dangers threaten at every turn, with attempts at defiance or escape punished by periods of starvation and confinement in cages; treacherous swamps surround the area, and a couple of vicious Doberman guard dogs are at hand to be sent after any fugitive. Despite this, however, nothing can break Kate's spirit, and her minor victories against the villains – helped by a mysterious masked figure, Mad Emma – help raise the morale of the other children.
- Something Old, Something New, Something Borrowed, Something Blue (illustrated by Tony Coleman)
- Sour Grapes for Sophie (illustrated by Tony Coleman) — new girl Sophie Drew snubs every offer of friendship. What is her problem?
- Spell of Fog (written by Jake Adams, illustrated by Tony Coleman) - A film crew want to make a film about Alice Compton, a victim of the witch hunts. Sally Groves, who has been deeply affected by the Compton case, protests when the director announces he is making a sensationalized version that depicts Alice as an actual agent of the Devil, not a hapless victim of superstition and hysteria. Then a strange fog appears, cuts the village off from the outside world and has the village progressively reverting to a 17th-century pattern in technology, dress and people's thinking. Hysteria erupts in the village as the fog takes hold and people think it's Alice's revenge.
- Stella Stirrer (illustrated by Tony Coleman) - Stella takes a job as a kitchenmaid at a top boarding school. She finds the kitchen an ideal place to stir up revenge for a snobby girl who keeps pestering her.
- Star Struck Sister (by Jenny McDade and Giorgio Giorgetti) - Lesley and Stella Ross are in Rome making their first film. Lesley is jealous of Stella because she believes she should have the starring role.
- The Stranger in My Shoes (drawn by Miguel Quesada) - Lucy Townsend is kidnapped and switched with delinquent Sandra Sage. Unless Lucy can convince someone of her identity, she will be serving Sandra's time while Sandra commits more crimes under Lucy's identity.
- The Strangest Stories Ever Told (by various writers and artists) — spooky stories told by The Storyteller, a pipe-smoking host (continued from June, from 1974; originally from School Friend); later adding Miss T and Misty (from Misty, from 1980).
- The Sungod's Golden Curse (drawn by Douglas Perry) — The town of Pueblo del Oro (Village of Gold) feels the wrath of the Sungod.
- Sweet and Sour Charity: Charity's every effort to be helpful goes wrong and leaves her on a sour note with everyone. Bully Viv Walker, who picks on her about it, always makes it worse.
- Swim for Your Life, Sari (drawn by Juan Garcia Quiros)
- The Swimmer Slave of Mrs Squall (written by Gerry Finley-Day, drawn by Douglas Perry) – Sue Briggs is a difficult pupil at school who seems no good at anything or even try. Then, when she trespasses at the reclusive Mrs Squall's house, her talent for swimming is discovered and Mrs Squall offers to train her as a champion. But Mrs Squall's motives and methods are not as noble as they seem.
- Tag-Along Tania (illustrated by Giorgio Giorgetti) - Tania is so put-upon that she has earned the nickname "tag-along." Finally, Tania decides enough is enough, but shedding the "tag-along" tag is proving far from easy.
- TEAM in Action (drawn by Carmona) - Four girls, whose initials spell TEAM, form a team of newshounds for the school newspaper, Action.
- Temper, Temper, Tina! (illustrated by Giorgio Giorgetti) - Tina Summers has temper trouble.
- Those Jumps Ahead of Jaki (illustrated by Eduardo Feito) - Jaki is the only rider who stands a chance of winning a top trophy for her friend, who lies in a coma. But the riding instructor, who was responsible for the accident, is determined to see Jaki doesn't win.
- Thursday's Child (written by Pat Mills) - Thursday Brown finds a strange girl called Julie in her bed, then learns that Julie is her future daughter, who has come back to the past to ruin Thursday's life with the help of a cursed Union Jack.
- Time Trap! (illustrated by Tony Higham) — Leonie Page becomes an experimental subject in a hypnotic regression to a previous existence. The experiment goes awry when the hypnotist suddenly collapses, leaving Leonie trapped in time — and it is a very dangerous time.
- Tina on a Tightrope (drawn by Roy Newby) - an aspiring model with a talent for tightrope walking.
- Tina's Telly Mum (written by Alison Christie, illustrated by Giorgio Giorgetti) Tina Mason regrets persuading her mother to apply for a job as a television announcer because now she is being neglected as Mum is putting her new job first. And the nasty, jealous housekeeper is not helping matters.
- Tomorrow Town (written by Benita Brown, illustrated by Jose Casanovas) - a Japanese electronics company sets up a town with the very latest in computers, gadgets, and state-of-the-art technology. Tomorrow Town is a little too technical and the human touch is disappearing.
- Towne in the Country (illustrated by Mario Capaldi) - Valerie Towne and her veterinarian father have moved to a new post in the country. Valerie soon realises she is going to be deeply involved in her father's work, but she is not all that confident around animals.
- The Town Without Telly (illustrated by Jose Casanovas) - the town of Boxless has no T.V. because of reception problems. Recepta's father is out to turn the people of Boxless into telly addicts. They become so addicted that they neglect their duties and Recepta must find a way to cure them.
- Two-Faced Teesha (illustrated by Jose Casanovas) - Teesha is a devious, spiteful girl who has just moved to the country. She surprises her father when she opts for the country school over a snob school, the type of school she used to attend in the past, but she only wants to attend because she thinks it will be easy to stir up trouble for them.
- Two Leads for Luther (illustrated by Mario Capaldi) — Two friends, Kim and Lisa, inherit a dog named Luther, but it leads to constant arguments, heaps of trouble and a strain on their friendship because they have opposing views on how to take care of him.
- The Upper Crust (illustrated by Giorgio Giorgetti) - a super-snobby district finds its upper crust image cracking when the mysterious Carrington-Crusts move in.
- The Uxdale Urchins (illustrated by Eduardo Feito) — A group of girls save coal mine ponies from being put down and start a riding club with them, "The Uxdale Urchins", but they soon find they have to contend with the snobs from another riding club.
- Vision of Vanity Fayre (illustrated by Mario Capaldi) - Ann Shaw is hired to play the young Vanity Fayre, a famous novelist, in a television series. However, Ann becomes embroiled in a real-life drama that is far more exciting and dangerous than any TV series.
- Waifs of the Wigmaker (written by Bill Harrington, illustrated by Mario Capaldi) - Moira must escape the slavery of a Victorian wigmaking business.
- Wars of the Roses (illustrated by Jose Casanovas) - Comedy with two families feuding over the same hobby.
- What's Wrong with Rhona? (illustrated by Eduardo Feito) - Rhona French starts acting strangely after she picks up a mysterious doll on the Salisbury Plain.
- Wee Sue — Sue Strong is the midget of Milltown, but what she lacks in height she more than makes up for in brains and generosity. Sue's brains are regularly called upon when it comes to dodging her grumpy, vain, bullying, slave-driving teacher Miss Bigger and the tons of homework she always dishes out. Continued from Sandie (from 1973)
- Witch Hazel (illustrated by Giorgio Giorgetti) - a witch called Hazel comes into the 20th century to learn witchcraft at a 20th-century school.
- The Witch of Widecombe Wold (written by Terence Magee) - when the Halifaxes move into the village of Widecombe Wold, they find they have a very witchy ancestress.
- Wolf at our Door (drawn by Bob Harvey) — Are wolves threatening the kennels owned by a widowed mother and her daughter?

== See also ==
- British girls' comics

== Sources ==
- Tammy at the Grand Comics Database
