= Sandie (comics) =

British girls' comic

- The cover of Sandie #12 (29 April 1972).

Publication information
- Publisher: Fleetway Publications; IPC Magazines
- Schedule: Weekly
- Format: Newsprint magazine
- Genre: Drama, School, Romance, Humour
- Publication date: 12 February 1972 – 20 October 1973
- No. of issues: 89
- Main character: Wee Sue
- Editor: John Wagner

Sandie was a British girls' comic, published by Fleetway, which lasted for 89 weekly issues between 12 February 1972 and 20 October 1973 before being merged into Tammy. The editor of Sandie was John Wagner.

Like many comics of its kind, the strips in Sandie focused on school, ballet, dogs and horses, and girl-next-door themes. Stories of girls confronting adversity predominated, with long-suffering heroines finally achieving happiness, while villainous relatives or girls who were liars, cheats, and bullies received their comeuppance.

The strips Wee Sue and Jeannie and Her Uncle "Meanie" moved to Tammy with the merger of the two titles.

== Strips ==
- Angela Angel Face
- Anna and the Circus
- Anna's Forbidden Friend
- Barbara and the Ballet of the Beautiful
- Bonnie's Butler
- Brenda's Brownies — humor strip
- Captives of Terror Island
- Cinderella Superstar
- Connie Courageous
- Dancing to Danger
- Friends and Neighbours
- Jeannie and Her Uncle "Meanie" — continued in Tammy.
- Little Lady Nobody
- Lorna's Lonely Days
- Nat the Cat
- No-One Cheers for Norah
- Odd Mann Out
- Our Big Secret
- Sandra Must Dance
- The School of No Escape
- Silver is a Star
- Slaves of the Eye
- Slaves of the Trapeze
- Wendy the Witch — humor strip
- Wee Sue — Sue Strong is the midget of Milltown, but what she lacks in height she more than makes up for in brains and generosity. Sue's brains are regularly called upon when it comes to dodging her grumpy, vain, bullying, slave-driving teacher Miss Bigger and the tons of homework she always dishes out. Continued in Tammy.

== Sources ==
- Sandie at the Grand Comics Database
