= Nikki (DC Thomson) =

British girls' comic

- The cover for Nikki #6 (30 March 1985), promoting the comics serial The Comp.

Publication information
- Publisher: DC Thomson
- Schedule: Weekly
- Format: Newsprint magazine
- Genre: Romance, Humour
- Publication date: 23 February 1985 – 2 September 1989
- No. of issues: 237

Nikki for Girls was a DC Thomson British girls' comic which lasted for 237 issues, between 23 February 1985 and 2 September 1989. Its target age group was the last years of primary school and first years of senior school. It was the last new title launched by DC Thomson. It is notable for the strip The Comp, which began in its first issue and continued in Bunty after Nikki folded.

== Strips ==
- The Comp — set in a co-educational comprehensive school known as Redvale. Moved to Bunty after Nikki folded.
- Don't Be So Clever, Katy!
- Girl Talk
- Just the Two of Us
- Photo Finish
- Reach for the Stars
- School for the Forgotten
- The School on Sinister Street
- The Secret Piano
- Spotty
- Star Wars
- Tom Came Too
