= Misty (comics) =

Weekly British comic magazine targeted to girls

- The cover of Misty #45 (9 December 1978), featuring the distinctive artwork of Shirley Bellwood.

Publication information
- Publisher: Fleetway
- Schedule: Weekly
- Format: Newsprint magazine
- Genre: Horror
- Publication date: 4 February 1978 – 12 January 1980
- No. of issues: 101

Creative team
- Written by: Pat Mills, Malcolm Shaw, Barry Clements
- Artist(s): Shirley Bellwood, John Armstrong, Joe Collins, Brian Delaney, John Richardson, Badia, Jesus Redondo, Ken Houghton, Peter Wilkes, Eduardo Feito, Bob Harvey, Honiera Romeu, María Barrera Castell (Gesalí), Mario Capaldi
- Editor: Malcolm Shaw

Collected editions
- Misty vol. 1: ISBN 978-1781084526
- Misty vol. 2: ISBN 978-1781086001
- Misty vol. 3: Wolf Girl & Other Stories: ISBN 978-1781086513

Misty was a weekly British comic magazine targeted at girls and published by Fleetway in the late 1970s. Focusing on horror stories, it was one of the few British girls' comics that was also popular with boys. Misty was published for less than two years.

== Publication history ==
Misty #1 was published on 4 February 1978. The final issue, #101, came out on 12 January 1980. The following week, Misty merged with Fleetway stablemate Tammy, which then adopted the title Tammy and Misty until September 1981.

Summer and holiday specials were published between 1978 and 1980, as well as eight annuals from 1979 until 1986, long after the weekly Misty had ceased to exist.

== Content ==
Misty was a collection of serial and one-off stories. Both types — complete stories and story instalments — were usually four pages long.

While Misty had similarities with its Fleetway stablemates Tammy and Jinty, each magazine had its own focus. Consultant editor Pat Mills' vision for Misty imagined it as a "female 2000 AD." He saw Carrie and Audrey Rose as models, which would be "modified for a younger audience."

Misty concentrated on supernatural and horror stories, featuring plots such as "pacts with the devil, schoolgirl sacrifice, the ghosts of hanged girls, sinister cults, evil scientists experimenting on the innocent and terrifying parallel worlds where the Nazis won the second world war." One-off stories often had troublemaking protagonists being punished in fantastic fashion.

The taglines for the first three covers emphasized a connection with the mystery genre. Subsequently the horror appeal became prominent, with taglines such as "Stories NOT to be read at night!" and "Dare you read it alone?"

There were no regular characters except for host Misty and the comic strip witch Miss T. Misty, whose appearance was designed by Shirley Bellwood, always welcomed the reader on the editorial page, and occasionally appeared on the cover. Miss T, meanwhile, attracted debate among readers as to whether its comic relief weakened or complemented the dark tones of Misty. After the merger with Tammy, Miss T joined the Tammy's Edie strip, which eventually became The Crayzees when Snoopa joined in the Tammy and Jinty merger on 28 November 1981. The strip continued until the Tammy and Princess merger on 7 April 1984.

The Cult of the Cat and The Black Widow were the only Misty stories to have sequels. The former continued in The Nine Lives of Nicola, the latter in Spider Woman (by then Misty had become part of Tammy).

Misty, following the tradition of British girls' comics, also published short text stories. Those were not present in every issue.

== Creators featured in Misty ==
=== Artists ===
Artists featured in the pages of Misty included John Armstrong (best known for drawing Bella at the Bar for Tammy), María Barrera, Brian Delaney, John Richardson, Jordi Badía Romero, Jesus Redondo, Ken Houghton, Peter Wilkes, Eduardo Feito, Bob Harvey, Honiera Romeu, and Mario Capaldi. Illustrator Shirley Bellwood did many covers for the weekly magazine as well as a number of Misty annuals and specials. Bellwood's ethereal art is a notable aspect of Misty. Joe Collins drew the Miss T strips.

The moon and bat cover logo was devised by Jack Cunningham.

=== Writers ===
Writers featured included Pat Mills, Malcolm Shaw, Wilf Prigmore, and (possibly) Barry Clements. Mills is credited with Moonchild and Hush, Hush, Sweet Rachel, and Shaw with The Sentinels.

Unlike the comics, text stories seem to have mostly been written by women, with Kitty Punchard and Anita Davies among them.

== List of strips and stories ==
- A Leap Through Time… — while on a school trip in Crete, shy Elena Hare takes refuge in the old amphitheatre and begins to daydream. She then has a vision of herself in the amphitheatre in the days of ancient Crete, performing a sort of bull-baiting dance with a live bull, which includes a series of amazing gymnastics, and wearing a crystal bull pendant. When she snaps out of her vision, the crystal bull is there. Back at school, Elena takes everyone by surprise with her stunning new gymnastics skills. But then she takes a fall while performing on the parallel bars and ends up in a coma. Elena's visions grow even more terrifying. In them, Crete is being plagued by quakes and Elena has been selected for sacrifice to the bull god, alongside a group of other girls.
- A Little Night Music — A witch takes revenge on a gang of pirates.
- Alien Seed — Libby Regan realises too late that her botanist uncle has been cultivating a man-eating alien plant.
- Aunt Mary's Blessing — Melody fears that she will inherit magical powers from her dying Aunt Mary, since witchcraft runs in the family.
- Blood Orange — A greengrocer's daughter becomes suspicious of a wealthy old man who buys oranges from her father. It turns out the man is a vampire who is being supplied with large quantities of blood inside the fruit.
- Cilla the Chiller — recurring strip about a schoolgirl ghost. This strip was notable for being more humorous and light-hearted than others in the comic.
- Danse Macabre — Scheming Nadia Nerona manages to cheat her way into the star role for the end-of-term production by Madame Krepskaya's dancing academy, then asks to borrow the ballet shoes Madame wore at the height of her success for luck. Madame refuses, so Nadia steals the shoes, then she finds the shoes just won't stop dancing, regardless of how exhausted she gets or the injuries her feet receive.
- Dark Secrets — A vampire attempts to feed on a young woman he meets on a train, but is thwarted when he discovers she is a ghost.
- Day of the Dragon — Gayle learns that she is the reincarnation of a young Chinese woman who killed herself to escape a forced marriage to an evil man. But the man, also reincarnated, has now found Gayle and wants to claim his bride.
- Dead End — Cath causes an old lady to get knocked down by a bus. She brushes off the resulting paranoia, until she gets a part-time job as house help...
- Don't Look Twice — Sammy Ingram is convinced her recurring nightmares are prophetic, and is determined to find out the mystery behind them before it's too late.
- Don’t Look Now — Jan Parker is always butting her nose into other people's business. While her parents are away for the weekend, a man sells her gold-rimmed glasses which let her see people as the animal that represents their character.
- Dressed to Kill — A bully gets her comeuppance when she attends a fancy dress party, unaware that one guest's costume is more than it seems.
- End of the Line... — Ann's father was one of a group of engineers believed to have been killed whilst working on an extension to the London Underground.
- An Eye for An Eye - In ancient Rome, Livia is a spoiled, cruel rich girl. She has grown extremely bored with Rome, so she has two African leopards brutally torn from their mother and brought to Rome for her amusement. They are subjected to cruel methods to break them, but get secret help from Livia’s slave, Esther.
- Fancy Another Jelly Baby? — A girl begins to question why a sweet shop's jelly babies look like the local children who have been reported missing.
- Food For Thought — A girl who enjoys eating live prawns just to watch them suffer is, herself, eaten alive by aliens that land on the beach.
- Garden of Evil — In a medieval fairytale setting, Tansy Fuller, a herbalist, is kidnapped and enslaved by the evil Lady Ruella to work in her secret garden. The garden is filled with nothing but poisonous plants. Hearing rumours that those who cross Ruella don’t live long, Tansy soon guesses the purpose of the garden.
- Hangman’s Alley — maidservant Melinda Walpole was wrongly executed for stealing a necklace from her mistress. Now Melinda has returned as a bitter, malicious ghost, who wants to take her revenge out on Jacey's hapless sister Mel for no other reason that Mel looks exactly like Melinda. Jacey offers to clear Melinda Walpole if the ghost will leave her sister alone, but the investigation proves a slow process and the ghost is losing patience.
- Happy Birthday, Spooky Sue — Sue is bullied by classmates who tease her about being "spooky." When she invites them to her birthday party, they find out how right they were.
- Heart's Desire — A pair of rich, elderly sisters invite two orphan girls to their home, offering to adopt the most deserving of the two and grant her "heart's desire." Dot is desperate to be chosen and escape her life of abuse; but suspects something isn't quite right about the old ladies' kind offer.
- Hunt the Ripper — In Victorian times, a girl is caught up in a showdown between Dracula and Jack the Ripper.
- Hush, Hush, Sweet Rachel — Lisa finds she is the reincarnation of a four-year-old called Rachel who died in a fire.
- Jorum Is Coming — Heather is possessed by an alien egg, and compelled to ensure by any means necessary that the egg will hatch.
- Journey into Fear — Kevin and Janice Frazer become pawns in an evil car's game to relive its past as a gangster's car.
- Mask of Fear — Sue takes a creepy mask to win a Halloween competition but then cannot remove it.
- Master Stroke — A peasant girl seeks the Queen in order to serve her, but there are terrible things happening in the land and talks of masters controlling the King.
- Mermaid - Sheila meets a mermaid, but finds out the mermaid wants to capture her soul so she (the mermaid) can venture on land; otherwise, she will be turned into a fish. The mermaid tries to bewitch Sheila with her music and lure her out to sea so they can swap places. Sheila tries to run, but no matter what she tries, she still hears the mermaid’s music...
- Midnight Masquerader — Sarah, a governess, investigates the mysterious Felix who has been visiting her young charge Elizabeth at midnight; and gets caught up in buried secrets involving Elizabeth's family.
- Miss T — A comic strip about a witch.
- Monster Movie — Kaye bullies her timid sister into investigating a spooky old house that was used as the shooting location for a horror film.
- Monster of Greenacres — Greenacres is being terrorized by a strange madman who kills people, and police have no idea as to his identity.
- Moodring — A moody teenage girl receives a magic mood ring.
- Moonchild — Rosemary Black possesses the power of telekinesis, like her grandmother before her, as shown by a crescent moon on her forehead. Her harsh mother is jealous of the power and forbids Rosemary to use it — but temptation is getting stronger against the bully who picks on Rosemary.
- Mountain Girl — a girl in a remote mountain area possesses psychic powers that enable her to control the weather, but greedy people from the local town try to take advantage of her.
- Mr. Walenski's Secret — Molly is wary of new neighbour Mr Walenski; who won't talk to anyone, carries a box with him at all times, and is regularly seen in the company of a mysterious man. In a departure from the comic's usual style, this story had no supernatural element, with the "twist" being that the neighbour is a survivor of a concentration camp — the box contains his memories of his family, and the man is a private detective hired to trace Mr Walenski's only surviving child.
- Nightmare Academy — Sharon Watts uncovers a sinister plot at her new boarding school, where mirrors are forbidden, guard dogs patrol the hallways, and girls are taught to mindlessly obey.
- Paint it Black — Maggie Laker discovers a box of paints which cause her to become possessed by the ghost of an artist.
- Poor Jenny — In Victorian London a young amnesic girl named Jenny has a nightmare of turning into a beast and men with no mercy chasing her, leading her to fear that she is a werewolf.
- Prisoner in the Attic — Elderly Connie Michaels is sorting out her attic when she is confronted by someone in the shadows — someone who seems to know an awful lot about her past.
- Queen's Weather — While sunbathing, Sally kills a bee, only to notice over the next few days that the other bees seem to be watching her.
- Raggsy Doll — A girl is to inherit a fortune. When her aunt hears of this, she sends her niece a cursed doll.
- Room For One More — Julie pays a terrible price for robbing an elderly shopkeeper.
- Roots — Jill Trotter's family is constantly on the move because her parents work as entertainers. Her wish to "put down roots" comes horribly true when she goes to live with her grandfather, who lives in a village that no one ever leaves.
- School of the Lost — a boarding school that demands a special tribute for the ongoing success of parents who send their daughters to it.
- Screaming Point! — the public hangman is also a resurrectionist who believes he can bring the dead back to life.
- Seal of Secrecy - Margaret’s father won’t let her swim in the sea or even learn to swim, saying the currents are too treacherous, and that her mother and uncle drowned in a boating accident. One day a girl named Dawn swims into the cove and befriends Margaret…
- Shadow of Doubt — Mary goes to investigate a noise that woke her up and hears voices in the barn, talking about taking over the village and then the world. She thinks she dreamed it, but the same thing happens the next night.
- Skullduggery — Anna is forced to assist a highwayman in his robberies.
- Spitting Image - Princess Rebecca is so vain she keeps only the plainest of servants around so she will look even more beautiful. She gets jealous when one servant, Sarah, starts growing more beautiful. Sarah says the change in her appearance seemed to start after an artist painted her looking that way, so Rebecca orders the same artist be brought to her to paint her portrait too...
- Sticks and Stones — how effective is this maxim against a poison pen columnist?
- Stranger In My Mirror — Mary falls victim to an evil reflection which escapes from her mirror and does terrible things, leading everyone to believe Mary is responsible.
- The Bell Jar — Katie's father has to attend the reading of his Great Aunt Mathilde's will. The family aren't expecting anything, but she does leave Kate a house and garden in a bell jar. Soon Kate starts having dreams where she is on the path that leads to the house, and each night she gets closer to the house.
- The Black Widow — Mrs Webb sets out to avenge her husband's death and take over the world using spiders and two brainwashed schoolgirls as her accomplices. Spider-Woman in the Tammy & Misty merger was a sequel.
- The Body Snatchers — the insane Dr. Bracken plans to conquer Britain by replacing real people with plant clones (see also Invasion of the Body Snatchers).
- The Cats of Carey Street — a feline fightback against council development.
- The Chase — The protagonist (no name is given) is feeding her pet fish Joey when he starts staring at her in an odd, hypnotic manner, and things take a turn for the deadly.
- The Cult of the Cat — Nicola Scott is destined to become a member of a cult who worship the Egyptian cat goddess Bast.
- The Curse of Castle Krumlaut — A married couple, who happen to be a werewolf and vampire, live in a haunted castle.
- The Dummy — Rhoda's father is more interested in his work as a ventriloquist than he is in his daughter; but her wish for him to pay more attention to her goes disastrously wrong.
- The Evil Djinn — after saving a djinn from choking to death, nurse Kitty is given three wishes, but they have terrible consequences.
- The Four Faces of Eve — Eve Marshall develops retrograde amnesia after an accident, and is unable to understand why her parents have become hateful towards her. She eventually discovers that she is a re-animated entity made from the corpses of four different girls, and her "parents" are really the scientists in charge of the experiment.
- The Ghost of Golightly Towers — When Amanda is sent to a tough reform school, she meets the ghost of Sir Giles Golightly; who's cursed to haunt the school until he can frighten someone away. Amanda agrees to help him, but the delinquent kids at the school aren't scared of anything ...
- The Girl Who Walked on Water — Nancy Pierce is sent to Mrs West, who has an "astonishing" success rate at reforming delinquents. While walking on the beach, Nancy is amazed to see a girl walking on the water, and decides to learn how she does it. But she soon regrets it...
- The Gravedigger’s Daughter — Katey Malden is being bullied because her father is the local gravedigger. Eventually, the bullying gets so bad that Katey runs off, contracts pneumonia and dies. But there's one more shock in store for the unremorseful head bully.
- The Green China Man — selfish Tina acquires a porcelain figure which grants wishes.
- The Haunting of Form 2B — Pupils are possessed by the ghosts of a class of Victorian schoolgirls who were killed a hundred years ago.
- The Jukebox — A gypsy boy makes the young people of Fiskfield suffer after they are prejudiced towards him.
- The Lighthouse Keeper’s Daughter - Criminals hide their loot in a deserted lighthouse, and shoot the lighthouse keeper Andy dead. Then they hear a girl’s voice calling for her father and go in search of her...
- The Loving Cup — Lucy finds that an antique cup that's been handed down through her mother's family has ancient powers.
- The Monkey — Kitty is a bully, and her worst vitriol is reserved for Benny, the organ grinder's monkey. One day Kitty pushes Benny too far and he bites her. Soon after, Kitty starts to hear the organ grinder's music out of nowhere, and every time she hears the music she behaves like a monkey.
- The Pig People — Lorna is jealous of Pearl, who seems to have a perfect life. Lorna learns that the secret of Pearl's fortune lies in an ancient amulet from a pig-worshipping cult.
- The Purple Emperor — Betty regards butterflies as nothing more than specimens for her butterfly collection and the more rare they are, the greater her triumph. During an attempt to catch a purple emperor, however, she has an accident and hits her head, which leads to a terrifying experience.
- The Salamander Girl — The adventures of Salah, a girl born from a fire; who has pyrokinetic powers and a mysterious salamander symbol on her shoulder.
- The Sea Maid — Anne visits a remote seaside village being terrorized by the "Sea Maid", a siren-like figure which causes shipwrecks.
- The Sea's Graveyard — Jane discovers scrolls foretelling of future drownings and shipwrecks, and comes up against Davy Jones himself.
- The Secret World of Sally Maxwell — Sally develops telepathic powers, throwing her into danger as others realise that she has learned their deadly secrets.
- The Sentinels — Centres around two apartment blocks called "The Sentinels", one of which is happily occupied while the other remains mysteriously empty. When Jan Richards' family loses their home and decides to hide out in the abandoned block so they can stay together, they are sent into a parallel world where Hitler conquered Britain in 1940; and everyone is in danger.
- The Silver Racer-Back — Aspiring swimmer Kerry discovers that her coach is mind-controlling her via a swimsuit that she received as an anonymous gift.
- The Swarm — When Tasmin's pest control pilot father comes home from the Middle East, he brings a locust with him. The next day, the locust escapes, and then more and more of them start appearing.
- The Takeover — Louise gains the ability to mimic the talents of anyone she chooses, but fails to realise that this harms the other person.
- The Treatment — Glenda Barton's parents have sent her to Country Park Corrective School. The school's methods make no headway with Glenda and she wants to escape. Then the staff decide she needs "The Treatment", which the school reserves for incorrigible cases like her...
- Titch’s Tale — A small girl nicknamed Titch goes flying her kite, until strange things began happening.
- Vengeance is Green… — Bullied Nina Parker finds a damaged ivy plant, and starts caring for it as her only friend.
- Welcome Home — A serial arsonist has a lucky escape after being caught in a fire inside a warehouse.
- What Did You Say? — a girl who loves to play the radio loudly falls asleep in a cemetery, and has a nightmare that her music is literally loud enough to wake the dead.
- When The Lights Go out! — a girl misbehaves in a relative's shop and gets turned into a shop room dummy as a consequence.
- When the Rain Falls…- In ancient Rome, Marcus and Amanda are separated when they are sold to different owners in the slave market. They both begin to hear a voice calling their names, and the voice reunites them. Convinced the voice is a call to freedom, they follow it...
- Whistle and I'll Come — a ghost dog companion.
- Winner Loses All — Sandy sells her soul to the Devil to save her alcoholic father. The Devil gives her a horse named Satan (conjured to life from a picture on the sign outside a pub) so that Sandy can fulfill her dream of becoming a show-jumping champion; but, if anyone guesses where the horse came from, the deal will be broken and Sandy will go to hell for all eternity.
- Wolf-Girl — Lona begins to exhibit supernatural powers which, unknown to her, are the result of her being raised by wolves as a baby.
- Wolfsbane — During a very dull trip to the countryside, Sara accepts a date with a boy she has just met. Her evening takes a horrifying turn when they stop at the deserted moor.

== Reprints and new specials ==
The Misty back catalogue is now owned by Rebellion Developments, which has reprinted Misty stories in the following volumes:

- Misty: Volume 1 (Moonchild, originally serialized in Misty #1-#13, and The Four Faces of Eve, originally serialized in #20-#31)
- Misty: Volume 2 (The Sentinels, originally serialized in Misty #1-#12, and End of the Line..., originally serialized in #28-#42)
- Misty: Volume 3 (Wolf Girl, originally serialized in Misty #65-#80, and one-off stories "Poor Jenny," "The Curse of the Wolf," "Wolfsbane," and "Twin Catastrophes")
- Misty Presents: The Jordi Badia Romero Collection
- Misty Presents: The Jaume Rumeu Collection

Since 2017 Rebellion has also published all-new Misty and Scream! & Misty specials.

In 2018 French publisher Delirium released Anthologie Misty. The comics included in the volume were the serials Moonchild, The Four Faces of Eve, and The Sentinels, and the one-off stories "Roots" and "Shadow of a Doubt."
