= Twinkle (comics) =

British comics magazine

- Twinkle, no. 399, 13 September 1975.

Publication information
- Publisher: DC Thomson
- Schedule: Weekly
- Format: Ongoing series
- Publication date: 27 January 1968 – 1999
- No. of issues: 1,612
- Main character(s): Twinkle

Twinkle, "the picture paper specially for little girls," was a popular British comics magazine, published by D. C. Thomson & Co. Ltd from 27 January 1968 to 1999 (1,612 issues). It was aimed at young girls and came out weekly, supplemented each year with a Summer Special and a hardcover Annual (the first annual was dated 1970).

The comics were introduced by Twinkle herself and featured comic strips, dress-up dolls, a Twinkle Club letters page, and, often, puzzles. Among the most popular comic strips were Nurse Nancy (illustrated by Sabine Price), Jenny Wren, Witch Winkle, Polly's Magic Paintbox, Goldilocks and Her Three Bears, My Baby Brother, The Three Pennys, Patsy Panda, Patty Pickle, Sally Sweet, Molly and her Dollies, and Dandy Lion.

Twinkle was given a makeover in the late 1970s and again in the late 1980s, but essentially the character of Twinkle, the comic strips and the essence of the comic remained the same throughout its life.

On 19 March 2012, the Royal Mail launched a special stamp collection to celebrate Britain's rich comic book history. The collection featured The Beano, The Dandy, Eagle, The Topper, Roy of the Rovers, Bunty, Buster, Valiant, Twinkle and 2000 AD.

== List of strips ==
- Caroline and her Magic Car - Caroline has a magic car that will take her anywhere.
- Dandy Lion
- Goldilocks and her Three Bears
- Goody Gumdrops - Goody lives in Sweetie Town, where everyone is named after sweets.
- Jean Genie - every time Gemma slaps the back pocket of her jeans a genie appears to grant her wish. The story is probably named after the song by David Bowie.
- Jenny Wren - Jenny is a little girl who likes to dress up and make herself look pretty.
- Jilly of Jingle Bell School
- Molly and her Dollies
- My Baby Brother - The adventures of a young girl and her baby brother.
- Nurse Nancy - Nancy and her grandad have a toy hospital.
- Patsy Panda
- Patty Pickle - similar to Silly Milly.
- Polly's Magic Paintbox - Whatever Polly paints comes to life because of her magic paints.
- Sally Sweet
- Silly Milly - She tries to do things right but always lands in a muddle.
- The Three Pennys - The adventures of 3 girls, all named Penny.
- Witch Winkle - Wendy Wilson has a very unusual friend - a witch called Winkle.

== See also ==
- British girls' comics

== Sources ==
- Twinkle at the Grand Comics Database
