= Dudley Pout =

Edward Dudley Pout (1908–1991) was a British illustrator.

Pout was born in November 1908, one of six children of E. J. Pout (1850-1930), who farmed 2,000 acres, on Frogs Island Farm, Herne, Kent.

Pout designed and illustrated the posters for several film from Ealing Studios, including The Goose Steps Out, Went the Day Well? The Black Sheep of Whitehall, The Love Lottery and The Bells Go Down.
