= Jordi Badía Romero =

Spanish comics artist (1938–1984)

- Born: Jordi Badía Romero; November 11, 1938 Barcelona, Spain
- Died: February 23, 1984 (aged 45)
- Area: Artist
- Pseudonyms: Jobaro; Jorge; Jorge B. Gálvez

Jordi Badía Romero (11 November 1938 – 23 February 1984), also known as Jobaro, Jorge or Jorge B. Gálvez, was a Spanish comic artist.

He began his career in the 1950s, illustrating Spanish adventure and romance stories, often working with his brother, Enrique Badía Romero; they signed their joint work "Hnos. Badía" (Badía Brothers). In the 1960s and '70s he worked for British comics companies Fleetway Publications and DC Thomson, including girls' comics Misty and Spellbound, illustrating Supercats for the latter. In the United States he contributed to Creepy in the 1970s and Tarzan in the '80s.

In 2019 his work for Misty was collected in a hardback graphic novel by the Treasury of British Comics.
