= Primrose Cumming =

British writer (1915–2004)

Amy Primrose Cumming
- Born: 1915; Isle of Thanet, Kent, U.K.
- Died: 2004 (aged 88–89)
- Occupation: Writer
- Writing career
- Years active: 1934–1969
- Genre: Pony books
- Notable work: Silver Snaffles

Primrose Cumming (1915–2004) was a British children's book author for over 30 years, writing popular and well-regarded pony book stories.

== Early life and career ==
Amy Primrose ("Peggie") Cumming was born on 7 April 1915 on the Isle of Thanet. She was the third child of Arthur Sommerville Cumming and Emily Christin Heath, after her brother Richard and sister Violet.

The Cumming family lived in the village of Sandhurst, Kent where Violet and Primrose were educated by a governess. Primrose's first story, about the travelling adventures of an ant, was published in Nursery World. She said:

"I found it tremendously exciting writing about the country things I knew, and being paid for it – even if I did collect piles of rejection slips, too!"

When Cumming was 17, her first novel, Doney was published. In a later interview with Country Life in 1934, Cumming explained that she was

"so keen on riding at this time, that I used to steal out early in the morning and ride the farmers’ horses in the fields. Then I wrote a book about my friend’s pony, Doney, and sold it. With the money, I bought Black Jack – who was rather too spirited for a beginner. When I took him hunting, he broke his bridle and off I came – in front of the whole field. At last we got on better terms and we both made our names by jumping everything in his path. To feed Black Jack, I wrote more books about country life, drawing on my own knowledge and experience. I had several published by the time I was 21.”

In 1938, Cumming began her series, The Silver Eagle Riding School. This followed the three Chantry sisters as they open a riding school. Her children's novel Rachel of Romney followed in 1939, about two children raising a Romney Marsh lamb.

== War work ==
During World War Two, Cumming spent a year working as a Land Girl at a nearby farm. Her second Chanty sisters book, Silver Eagles Carries On, was published in 1940.

On 15 October 1940, Cumming was looking after sheep in a field when a Messerschmitt 110 crashed into it. She fictionalised her experiences on the farm in her book Owl's Castle Farm.

Cummings then joined the Auxiliary Territorial Service where she spent the remainder of her war working in an anti-aircraft battery. She wrote her only non-contemporary book, The Great Horses, during this period. It is an historical fiction, tracing the experiences of a line of heavy horses over several centuries.

== Later career ==
After the war, Cumming had a temporary job as under-matron in a boys’ school. This was not a success, as she saw the boys’ side rather more easily than the masters’. She returned to her family home in East Sussex, and decided to stick to writing and gardening. Horses were by no means her only interest: she was an expert flower arranger, and exhibited at the local flower shows and the Chelsea Flower Show.

The books she published in her later years were based less closely on her own experiences. After parting company with publisher J. M. Dent in the late 1960s, Primrose Cumming carried on writing for D. C. Thomson & Co., the magazine publishers, on many subjects and also contributed short stories to several editions of The Pony Club Annual.

Cumming stopped writing in the 1960s, feeling that she was becoming out of touch with modern youth.

Primrose Cumming died in 2004.

All of Cumming's books fell out of print until 2007, when Fidra Books republished Silver Snaffles.

== Bibliography ==
- Doney – a Borderland Tale of Ponies and Young People (Country Life, 1934, illustrated by Allen W Seaby)
- Spider Dog (Country Life, 1936, illustrated by Barbara Turner)
- Silver Snaffles (Blackie, 1937, illustrated by Stanley Lloyd)
- The Silver Eagle Riding School (A & C Black, 1938, illustrated by Cecil Trew)
- Rachel of Romney (Country Life, 1939, illustrated by Nina Scott-Langley)
- The Wednesday Pony (Blackie, 1939, illustrated by Stanley Lloyd)
- Ben: The Story of A Cart-Horse (Dent, 1939, illustrated with photographs by Harold Burdekin)
- The Chestnut Filly (Blackie, 1940, illustrated by Stanley Lloyd)
- Silver Eagle Carries On (A & C Black, 1940, illustrated by Cecil Trew)
- Owls Castle Farm (A & C Black, 1942, illustrated by Veronica Baker)
- The Great Horses (Dent, 1946, illustrated by Lionel Edwards)
- Trouble At Trimbles (Country Life, 1949, illustrated by Geoffrey Whittam)
- Four Rode Home (Dent, 1951, illustrated by Maurice Tulloch)
- Rivals To Silver Eagle (A & C Black, 1954, illustrated by Eve Gossett)
- No Place For Ponies (Dent, 1954, illustrated by Maurice Tulloch)
- The Deep-Sea Horse (Dent, 1956, illustrated by Mary Shillabeer)
- Flying Horseman (Dent, 1959, illustrated by Sheila Rose)
- The Mystery Trek (Dent, 1964, illustrated by Sheila Rose)
- Foal of the Fjords (Dent, 1966, illustrated by Wendy Marchant)
- Penny and Pegasus (Dent, 1969, illustrated by Mary Gernat)

== Sources ==
- The Fascinating Story of a Writer. .... Primrose Cumming – Growing Up, by Primrose Cumming in Judy, 1963
- Folly Magazine, no 44, Spring 2005
- Badger, J. Introduction in Silver Snaffles, by Primrose Cumming. Edinburgh: Fidra Books, 2007
