= List of Princess (comics) stories =

A list of stories in British weekly girls' comic Princess, published between 1960 and 1967 by Fleetway Publications.

== Stories ==
=== Alice in Spaceland ===
Published: 16 October 1965 to 22 October 1966
Writer: Mary Elwyn Patchett
Illustrator: Mark Peppé

Doctor Dodds takes his daughters Alice and Dinah – along with crewmembers Steve Greg and Tim Stone – on a rocket ride to strange new worlds.

- Text story; based on Alice's Adventures in Wonderland by Lewis Carroll. Also in Princess Giftbook for Girls 1967 (illustrated by Ferguson Dewar).

=== Alona – The Wild One ===
Published: 1 January 1965 to 16 September 1967
Artists: Leslie Otway, Jean Sidobre

Daughter of a governor in the West Indies, Alona Richards' daring and habit of taking on any challenge in front of her soon earns the girl the nickname "The Wild One". A gifted rider, sailor, swimmer and dancer, Alona never hesitates to help out the needy.

- Continued in Princess Tina. Also in Princess Gift Book for Girls, Tina (2 September to 15 October 1966, as a preview for Princess Tina), Princess Picture Library No. 111 and June and Schoolfriend Picture Library No. 366.

=== Annette's Secret ===
Published: 10 June to 12 August 1967

In 1643, with the English Civil War growing in intensity, Caroline Masterman returns home to Mandyke Manor only to find her father – a Royalist colonel – has disappeared. Her Uncle Digby claims Colonel Masterman has defected to the Roundheads, while Caroline finds her beloved governess Mam'zelle Annette is distant and evasive. Surmising something more is at work, Caroline begins to investigate.

=== The Apple Orchard Summer ===
Published: 25 May to 12 August 1967
Writer: Jennifer Farley

Jane and her cousin Timothy holiday in Brittany and soon find clues to ancient treasure buried nearby.

- Text story.

=== Belle and Mamie ===
Published: 10 October 1964 to 5 March 1966
Artist: Harry Lindfield

Ballet dancers (and inseparable best friends) Belle and Mamie frequently get involved in odd goings-on wherever their dance school mounts a production.

- Continued from Girl, where it had started as "Belle of the Ballet" in 1952. Earlier storylines from Girl were later modified and reprinted in Princess as "Lyndy of Latymer Grange".

=== Betty Butterfingers ===
Published: ? to 24 December 1960

Clumsy Betty's attempts to help around the house inevitably cause more work for her parents.

- Half-page humour cartoon.

=== Candy and Mandy ===
Published: 30 January 1960 to 12 October 1963
Artist: Fergusson Dewar

Cheerful, diminutive young jockey Mandy's attempts at horse-riding are frequently stymied by her rotund, lazy, mop-topped mount Candy.

- One-page humour strip, no relation to the characters from the Bunty story "The Best of Friends". Also in Princess Gift Book for Girls 1961 to 1963 and 1970 to 1971, Princess Tina Summer Extra 1968 and Jinty Annual 1985.

=== Castle in the Mist ===
Published: 10 March to 7 July 1962
Artist: Laurence Houghton

Siblings Moira and Robin Tweedie move to Scotland when their father inherits a castle from an unknown distant relative by the name of Duncan MacRae. However, odd happenings begin soon after they arrive and it begins to look like the family have instead been left a curse.

- Reprinted in Princess from 29 July to 19 September 1967.

=== Circus Ballerina ===
Published: 30 January 1960 to 12 October 1963
Writer: Ron Clark
Artists: Bill Lacey, Charles Paine

Raised as part of Duncan's Circus, Sally Doyle desperately wants to be a ballerina, and gets secret lessons from Ms. Novajinsky. Later, Novajinsky and choreographer Lydia Dawney form a travelling ballet company so Sally can perform for both the ballet and the circus.

- Also in Princess Gift Book for Girls and Princess Picture Library (all even numbers to 1964, occasional 1964 to 1966).

=== Crocus – The Story of a Remarkable Cat ===
Published: 18 November 1961 to 6 October 1962
Writer: George E. Rochester

Alex meets a cat called Crocus, who can both talk and magically disappear when he so desires. Together the pair right local wrongs while Alex keeps Crocus' true nature a secret.

- Also in Princess Gift Book for Girls 1963.

=== Dancing into Danger ===
Published: 14 January to 18 February 1967 31/12/66
Artist: Dudley Wynn

Promising dancer Hilary Bryce seems set for a glorious career until her parents are killed in a motor accident and she has to live with her Aunt Jean. She continues to dance in local productions around working in Jean's shop, and one day receives a mysterious note from an audience member that seems to offer her a dream professional engagement. However, it seems Hilary' opportunity might not be as straightforward as it first appears.

=== Daughter of Lorna Doone ===
Published: c. 1964/65 to 8 May 1965
Illustrator: Clive Uptton

The adventures of the resourceful Amber Ridd, of the daughter of Lorna Doone and Sir John Ridd, in 18th century England.

- Text story. A sequel to the Princess adaptation of Lorna Doone itself. Also in the Princess Giftbook for Girls 1966 (as a picture strip) and 1967.

=== Daughters of Adventure ===
Published: 30 January 1960 to 2 February 1961
Writer: Marjorie Coryn
Illustrator: John Millar Watt

The adventures of the resourceful Amber Ridd, of the daughter of Lorna Doone and Sir John Ridd, in 18th century England.

- Anthology text story, with various fictional heroines through history.

=== Dorinda ===
Published: 23 July 1966 to 16 September 1967

Dorinda writes letters to her friend Belle, recounting her adventures in London.

- Text story.

=== The Flying Nurse ===
Published: c. 1964 to 23 July 1966
Artists: Bill Baker, Don Harley

Beth Lawson is a well-known flying nurse.

- Renamed "Beth Lawson – Outback Nurse" from 16 October 1965. Also in Princess Giftbook for Girls 1966 to 1967.

=== Fran and the Dolphin Watch ===
Published: 4 February to 18 March 1967

After her father dies, Fran Oliver lives alone at Ashfield Manor. She is pulled into the local magistrate's search for the wanted highwayman Captain Lister, but after meeting the dashing young man starts to doubt his guilt – and the motives of her family lawyer Mr. Truscott.

=== Gilda – Girl of the Mountains ===
Published: 3 September to 8 October 1966

=== The Girl Who Knew Everything ===
Published: c. 1964/65 to 1 May 1965

Dim schoolgirl Kathie Betts suddenly becomes highly intelligence, to the surprise of her peers. Little do they know that her increased smarts are due to her hosting two crash-landed visitors from the planet Trion.

=== The Girl with the Golden Voice ===
Published: 30 June to 25 August 1962

Orphaned Joanna Johnson has to live with her Aunt Sophie and her cousin Gillian. Sophie is grooming her bratty offspring as a singing star but it is Joanna who has the talent – something her aunt will go to any lengths to keep under wraps.

- Not to be confused with the story of the same name from Bunty.

=== The Golden Talisman ===
Published: 31 July 1965 to 24 June 1967
Writer: Sylvia Thorpe
Illustrator: Henry Seabright

The storied times of a golden brooch that is reputed to bring happiness to all true lovers as it passes from owner to owner over the centuries.

- Text story.

=== The Happy Days ===
Published: 30 January 1960 to 16 September 1967
Writer: Jenny Butterworth
Artist: Andrew J. Wilson

Sue Day relates the madcap events that fill the life of the Day family – city-working Dad, apron-clad Mum, brother Sid, big sister and socially delicate Gloria, dog Rover and double whirlwinds of destruction The Twins, with occasional appearances from Sue's equally cheerful best friend Edie Potter and her brother Tommy.

- Continued in Princess Tina. Also in Princess Gift Book for Girls and Princess Picture Library (all even numbers to 1964, occasional 1964 to 1966).

=== Heiress to Tangurau ===
Published: 12 May to 22 September 1962

Orphan Tina Rogers inherits a sheep farm in Tangurau, New Zealand from a distant great uncle. Māori Te Ariki Maru has been appointed foreman; told he is a witch doctor, she is surprised to find him a well-spoken conventionally-dressed man with a doctorate. Tina also makes fast friends with local boy Billy Giles, but finds rival farmer Walt Snaith less welcoming.

- The story's art has often been credited to Leslie Otway, but this has been questioned by David Roach. New Zealand comics historian Matt Emery has praised the story for its largely accurate representation of both the country and Māori of the time, suggesting at least one of the writer or artist were familiar with the country, speculating that Noel Cook, who had worked for Amalgamated Press and Fleetway Publications, was a candidate.

=== Highway of the Sun ===
Published: 6 October to 1 December 1962
Artist: Alfredo Sanchís Cortés

At the end of the school term, Molly Brennan receives a telegram of an exciting discovery he has made in Peru and books her plane tickets to join him. However, when she arrives she is met by one of his apparent colleagues and watched by strangers, and it turns out others want her father's knowledge.

=== Jenny – Girl Reporter ===
Published: 25 February to 22 April 1967

Jenny Fraser tries to follow her dream by becoming a reporter for the Sunbourne Mercury, but is turned away as too young. Determined to prove otherwise, she plans to get an interview with American singing sensation Dane Marlowe – only to stumble upon a plot against the balladeer.

- Previously printed in Schoolgirls' Picture Library No. 64 in 1959.

=== Jenny Wrenn – Student Nurse ===
Published: 10 March to 15 September 1962 10 March 1962
Artist: Jean Sidobre

After a successful interview, Jenny Wrenn is accepted as a student at the Preliminary Training School of Whitecross Royal Hospital. She makes fast friends with two fellow aspiring nurses, Ruth Lomax and Tana Lai, and begins to find there is more to nursing than she thought.

- Renamed "Jenny Wrenn of Whitecross" from 16 June 1962 after Jenny successfully completed training.

=== Jenny's Jolly Genie ===
Published: 30 January 1960 to ?
Writer: George E. Rochester

Jenny Raynor knocks over an old brass bottle in her uncle's antique shop, summoning the genie Abdul el Ramjar. Putting himself under her control, the genie helps Jenny and her little brother Sammy get into all sorts of japes.

- Text story. Also in Princess Giftbook for Girls 1961.

=== Jo on Rainbow Island ===
Published: 30 January 1960 to 11 March 1961
Artist: Bill Baker

Finding herself a castaway on Rainbow Island, Jo Laurie makes friends with a native girl called Luana. The pair try to build a raft so they can find their way to Tahia and Jo's father, but soon find that someone might be sabotaging their plans.

=== Just Jackie ===
Published: 2 February to 12 October 1963

Good-natured Jackie tries to help her mother around the house.

- Text story.

=== Lettice ===
Published: 10 October 1964 to 16 September 1967
Artist: John Ryan

While enduring a frosty relationship with head Miss Froth and her deputy Miss Tantrum, bespectacled schoolgirl Lettice Leaf frequently comes up on top due to a mixture of unconventional thinking and good luck.

- Half-page humour cartoon, continued from Girl.

=== Life with Uncle Lionel ===
Published: 10 October 1964 to 16 September 1967
Writer: Scott Goodall
Artist: Hugh McNeill

Julie and Robert Bradshaw live with their Uncle Lionel in a rectory in Lower Poppleton. Their uncle is an inventor, and while undoubtedly a genius and a kindly fellow to boot his innovations rarely work as intended, often landing the trio in bizarre situations.

- Half-page humour cartoon, continued from Girl. Also in Princess Picture Library No. 81, #95 and No. 97 and June and Schoolfriend Picture Library No. 368.

=== The Limpets ===
Published: 11 August to 1 December 1962

Roxy, Chris, Linda, David and Taggy are five of the best-known children on Bird Island, earning the nickname 'the Limpets' due to the time they spend together. After learning that the island's owner, Mr. Waley, is planning on selling up the gang put their heads together to change his mind.

=== Linda – Vet's Daughter ===
Published: 8 September to 1 December 1962

Since her mother died, Linda Dell has helped out at her father's veterinary surgery, and soon finds herself learning new skills on the job.

=== Lucia and the Golden Mermaid ===
Published: 28 January to 29 April 1961
Artist: Guido Buzzelli

San Marco friends Lucia and Guido learn that an Englishman and his daughter Ellen have arrived in the village, bearing a map to the whereabouts of a priceless golden mermaid statue they have long wished to find. A waiter called Tonio meanwhile tries to pit both groups against each other so he can be the one to find it.

- Reprinted as "Lucia and Guido" from 1 July to 12 August 1967.

=== Lyndy of Latymer Grange ===
Published: 4 February to 16 September 1967
Writer: George Beardmore
Artist: John Worsley

Young ballerina Lyndy Kenton enrols at Latymer Grange Ballet School, training with her friends Mamie and Hotzi under the famed Madame Petrova.

- Modified versions of early "Belle of the Ballet" stories from Girl, which had concluded in Princess as "Belle and Mamie" the previous year. The strip retained its colour.

=== Mary-Jo ===
Published: c. 1964/65 to 16 September 1967
Artist: Tom Kerr, Shirley Tourret

Mary Jo's rich, eccentric Aunt Polly takes her touring around the world, with Mary inevitably getting involved in some plot wherever they land.

=== Minx and Her Friend Dennis ===
Published: 10 October 1964 to 16 September 1967

Minx causes problems and injuries to her friend Dennis.

- Half-page humour cartoon, continued from Girl.

=== Molly Must Not Ride ===
Published: c. 1963
Writer: Pat Smythe

After losing the use of her legs in a show-jumping accident, Molly Howard is told she will never ride again. Her parents sell her beloved pony Midnight before they are called away to Malaya on business, and Molly is put into the care of her Aunt Agatha in the country. Despite her father's orders not to let the girl anywhere near horses, Agatha has other ideas.

=== Mopsy ===
Published: 12 January 1961 to 1 December 1962

The adventures of a cheerful, kind terrier.

- Half-page humour strip. Not to be confused with the American comic book character of the same name.

=== The Mystery of Melham Castle ===
Published: 29 April to 24 June 1967

Jan Melham goes to stay with her Aunt Sarah at the stately Melham Castle, but arrives to find her gone and the house rented out to a film company. She soon begins to suspect film director Brant and his daughter Verena are plotting against Aunt Sarah, and is able to persuade leading man Rick Danvers to help her thwart their plans.

=== The Mystery of the Leopard Bell ===
Published: c. 1963

Two girls try to undercover the mystery of the Leopard Bell.

- Modified reprint of "Jill Crusoe and the Golden Bell", originally printed in School Friend in 1954–55.

=== Northwest to Adventure ===
Published: 17 February to 28 April 1962

After a series of misfortunes see them stranded in the tundra, siblings Mary, Jean and Roger Gilroy – aided by their hound Skip – try to slog their way back to civilisation.

=== Nurse Angela ===
Published: 18 November 1961 to 3 March 1962
Artist: Mike Hubbard

Young district nurse Angela Ford is given charge of a young unconscious patient, and soon finds the boy is at the centre of a conspiracy.

- Also in Schoolgirls' Picture Library No. 173.

=== On stage ===
Published: 12 March 1966 to 16 September 1967
Writer and artist: Leonard Starr

Young actress Mary Perkins tries to avoid backstage drama and break through on Broadway.

- Reprints of the Chicago Tribune-New York News Syndicate newspaper strip.

=== Pam and Peter ===
Published: 30 January 1960 to 24 June 1961
Artist: Mollie Higgins

Orphans Pam and Peter Hart go on the run from their cruel guardian Amos Scrudge, meeting many helpful people along the way.

=== Penny – Ship's Nurse ===
Published: 30 January 1960 to 24 June 1961
Writer: George E. Rochester

Penny Baxter and her colleague Mauren O'Malley meet all manner of patients both on board their ship and at exotic ports around the world.

- Text story.

=== Petal the Little Imp ===
Published: 30 January 1960 to 12 October 1963
Artist: James Malcolm

Despite her best efforts and upbeat personality Petal's gauche behaviour causes trouble for all around her.

- Half-page humour strip.

=== The Print of Time ===
Published: 19 August to 16 September 1967
Writer: Jennifer Farley

Discovering a cave painting, Kate touches it – and finds herself transported back to the Stone Age.

- Text story.

=== Rebecca ===
Published: 27 August to 24 December 1966
Artist: Robert MacGillivray

Growing up on a barge with her widower artist father, Rebecca Drake picks up all manner of anarchic habits.

- Reprints of "Madcap Rebecca" from School Friend.

=== Sandy ===
Published: c. 1963

Daughter of a hospital matron, Sandy Shaw is thrown together with patient's daughter Janet Baxter. The pair initially fail to get along but become friendlier after they – and a hospital porter known as Chunky – get involved in a strange plot.

=== Silva of Winter Wonderland ===
Published: 3 December 1966 to 13 May 1967

After moving to Switzerland to live with relations, Silva Graham discovers an aptitude for all things alpine and becomes a trainer for the Manfred Winter Sports Agency.

=== Sunshine Village ===
Published: 17 February to 16 June 1962

Elvi Winton works as a hostess at San Paola Holiday Village, and is selected by the owner to represent the resort at a prestigious swimming gala, but her practicing is complicated when she also wants to help her friend Sylva on her family's farm, and enlists the help of boat boy Gianni to help balance her schedule.

=== The Sword of Freedom ===
Published: 8 April to 3 June 1967
Artist: W. Bryce-Hamilton

During the height of the English Civil War, the noble Cavalier Sir Geoffrey Deepwood is sent on a vital mission for King Charles. After Sir Geoffrey is injured, his resourceful daughter Valerie must get a vital sword past the Roundheads.

- Reprint of "Her Secret Mission for King Charles" from School Friend. Also in Schoolgirls' Picture Library No. 84 as "Valerie and the Sword of Freedom".

=== Tess of the Texas Moon ===
Published: 30 January to ? 1960
Artist: Colin Merritt

After arriving at a ranch, Tess tries to broker peace between the owners and a tribe of Comanche living nearby, after befriending Black Hawk, son of the tribe's chief.

=== Tilly Tuffin ===
Published: c. 1963/64 to 17 July 1965
Writer: John W. Wheway (as Hazel Armitage)

Rotund, upbeat schoolgirl Tilly Tuffin – a member of the Fourth Form of Springcliffe School – often gets herself and chums Tracey Pitt, Gail Brookland, Janet Gordon and Thomasina Tomlinson into scrapes and japes.

- Text story. Also in Princess Picture Library as a picture strip.

=== Trudi and the Mystery of Black Mountain ===
Published: 5 November 1960 to 21 January 1961

Living in a Tyrolean village, Trudi Hoeffler is devastated when her father Hans, a guide, disappears on a trek to the Black Mountain. She soon begins to suspect his rival guide Karl has something to do with his vanishing.

- Later modified and reprinted as "Gilda – Girl of the Mountains" in 1966.

=== Vicky ===
Published: 30 July 1966 to 22 July 1967
Writer: Betty Roland
Artist: Gerald Haylock

Vicky joins her father, Professor Curtis, on archaeological expeditions to exotic locales.

- Reprinted from Girl, in grayscale instead of colour; 30 July to 11 February 1967 reprints "Valley of the Moon", 18 February to 22 July 1967 reprints "Vicky and the Vengeance of the Incas".

=== Wagons Westward ===
Published: ? 1961 to 6 January 1962

Lindy Miller travels on a wagon train to Sacramento in the hope of reuniting with her father. While the natives attack the convoy, a bigger threat comes from the ruthless outlaw Bart Logan; Lindy must work with her friend Hattie Hanfull and the gallant wagon master Captain Eager to keep everyone safe.

=== Wendy's Wizard ===
Published: 17 July 1965 to 17 September 1966
Writer: Karen Wesley (Note: Possibly a pen name; the identities of many who wrote for comics of the period are still unknown.)
Artist: Richard Rose

Knocking over a vase in a dingy second-hand shop, Wendy finds herself in command of genie Abu-del-wong.

- Text story.

=== A Year with Grandma ===
Published: 16 October 1965 to 5 August 1967 16/10/65
Writer: Janet Darby
Artist: Gwen and Shirley Touret

With their parents in Germany for a year on business, Judy and Christina Marsden stay with their grandmother in Wilde's Cottage in the countryside.

- Text story.

== Serialisations and Abridgements ==
Text stories unless noted otherwise.

- Five Are Together Again

Published: 30 January to 28 May 1960
Author: Enid Blyton
Illustrator: Eileen Soper

- Lorna Doone

Published: 30 January to ? 1960
Author: R. D. Blackmore
Illustrator: H. M. Brock

- Good Old Secret Seven

Published: 4 June 1960 to 7 January 1961
Author: Enid Blyton
Illustrator: Eric Parker

- Five Go to Demon's Rocks

Published: 14 January to 24 June 1961
Author: Enid Blyton
Illustrator: Eric Parker

- National Velvet

Published: 6 May to 24 June 1961
Author: Enid Bagnold

- Look Out Secret Seven!

Published: 1 July to 7 October 1961
Author: Enid Blyton
Illustrator: Eric Parker

- The Silver Lantern

Published: 18 November 1961 to 17 February 1962
Author: Cecily Danby

- Gabriels

Published: 24 March to 16 June 1962
Author: James Stagg

- Daddy-Long-Legs

Published: 30 June to 15 September 1962
Author: Jean Webster
Illustrator: Leslie Otway

- Girl of the Limberlost

Published: c. Autumn/Winter 1962 to 1963
Author: Gene Stratton-Porter
Illustrator: Leslie Otway

- Five Together Again

Published: 26 January to 18 May 1963
Author: Enid Blyton
Illustrator: Eric Parker

- The Scarlet Pimpernel

Published: 2 February to 4 May 1963
Author: Emma Orczy
Illustrator: John Millar Watt

- The Children of the New Forest

Published: 31 August to ? 1963
Author: Frederick Marryat
Illustrator: Ron Embleton

- The Hobbit

Published: 10 October 1964 to 16 January 1965
Author: J. R. R. Tolkien
Illustrator: Ferguson Dewar

- Looking After Billy

Published: ? to 13 February 1965
Author: Margaret West

- Black Hearts in Battersea

Published: 23 January to 17 April 1965
Author: Joan Aiken

- The House with a Secret

Published: 20 February to 10 October 1965
Author: Margaret West

- White Boots

Published: 24 April to 7 August 1965
Author: Noel Streatfeild

- Chocky

Published: 14 August to 2 October 1965
Author: John Wyndham
Illustrator: Leslie Caswell

- Mary Poppins

Published: 16 October to 20 November 1965
Author: P. L. Travers

- The Ghost Next Door

Published: 27 November 1965 to 26 February 1966
Author: Jenifer Wayne

- Merry By Name

Published: 9 April to 16 July 1966
Author: Jenifer Wayne
Illustrator: Leslie Caswell

- The Vanishing Vase

Published: 24 September to 12 November 1966
Author: Shirley Dene

- The Loring Mystery

Published: 15 October to 3 December 1966
Author: Jeffery Farnol
Illustrator: H. M. Brock

- Picture strip, reprinted from Thriller Picture Library No. 31.

- Trekkers' Trail

Published: 29 October to 17 December 1966
Author: Carol Vaughan

- Jane Eyre

Published: 10 December 1966 to 4 February 1967
Author: Charlotte Brontë
Artist: Joan Whitford
- Picture strip, reprinted from Thriller Picture Library No. 31.

- Green Heart

Published: 24 December 1966 to 25 February 1967
Author: Vian Smith

- Come Down the Mountain

Published: 4 March to 20 May 1967
Author: Vian Smith
Illustrator: Colin Merritt

- Vanity Fair

Published: 20 May to 16 September 1967
Author: William Makepeace Thackeray
Artist: Leo Davy
- Picture strip, reprinted from Girl.

- The Wizard of Oz

Published: 16 September 1967
Author: L. Frank Baum
- Preview for the forthcoming merger with Tina, where the adaptation was running and would be continued in Princess Tina.
