= List of Princess Tina stories =

A list of stories in British weekly girls' comic Princess Tina, published between 1967 and 1974 by Fleetway Publications and IPC Magazines.

== Stories ==
=== Addie's Ad-ventures ===
Published: 17 March to 7 April 1973

Faced with the prospect of having to work at a sausage factory with her father, school leaver Adele Smith resolves to instead find a career herself in the newspaper advert columns. Unfortunately, the abbreviated descriptions often leave her misinterpreting what she's signing up for.

=== Alona — The Wild One ===
Published: 23 September 1967 to 14 March 1970
Artists: Leslie Otway,

Daughter of a governor in the West Indies, Alona Richards' daring and habit of taking on any challenge in front of her soon earns the girl the nickname "The Wild One". A gifted rider, sailor, swimmer and dancer, Alona never hesitates to help out the needy.

- Continued from Princess. Later returned in reprints from 14 April 1973 to 12 January 1974. Also in Princess Gift Book for Girls, Princess Tina Annual, Princess Picture Library #111 and June and Schoolfriend Picture Library #366.

=== Anna at the Court of Siam ===
Published: 25 May to 10 August 1968
Writer: Barry Cork
Artist: Dudley Pout

In 1849, Welsh girl Anna Crawford finishes at school in England and travels to the east, where her mother is getting remarried in Bombay. She is then invited to the court of the King of Siam.

- Modified reprint of "Journey to a Throne" from Girl.

=== Barbie - The Model Girl ===
Published: 23 September 1967 to 25 December 1971
Artist: A.E. Allen, Graeme Thomas

Fed up with life as an underappreciated office girl, Barbie Brown decides to take up a modelling career. Supported by her mischievous little sister Skipper, she lands representation from agent Ken Ballantyne. Barbie's kind behaviour, quick wits, fashion sense and good looks soon launch her on a globetrotting career, courted by many of the world's most famous designers.

- Licensed strip, based on the Mattel fashion doll of the same name. Continued from Tina.

=== Brave Lady Mary ===
Published: 8 March to 18 October 1969
Writer: Chad Varah
Artist: Gerry Haylock

In 1859, Durham rector's daughter Mary Bird arrives in Persia to begin missionary work.

- Modified reprint of "Persia's Lady Mary" from Girl.

=== Call Me Lucky ===
Published: 3 March to 5 May 1973
Artist: Santiago Hernandez Martin

Merle is the daughter of world-famous film star Raquel Jordan ("Yes, the Raquel Jordan"). While her peers believe she is the luckiest girl in the world the reality of Merle's life as her mother's celebrity and work leaves her with less and less time for her daughter is quite different.

=== Candy's No Lady! ===
Published: 9 December 1972 to 13 January 1973
Artist: Cándido Pueyo

In the Old West, tomboy orphan Candy Smith is eager to help out on her Uncle Melia's farm in Roxburgh, Texas. However, her uncle wants to follow her late parents' wishes that she be raised as a refined lady, and after the local schoolmistress finally tires of Candy's disruptive behaviour, he sends her to a finishing school in Houston in the hope she can learn some manners and other ladylike graces.

=== Careful - She Bites! ===
Published: 31 March to 30 June 1973
Artist: Victor Ramos, Michael Strand

Aged fourteen, Trisha Damone leads a quiet and reclusive life in a caravan near the village of Livington, following the death of her mother and her father's disappearance. Her lonely experience is brought to an end when social services order her to be take into council accommodation, but Trisha's unusual upbringing means she does not mix well with others.

=== Catherine Arrogant ===
Published: 18 March to 22 April 1972; 24 June to 12 August 1972
Artists: Alessandro Chiarolla, Giorgio Cambiotti

Catherine Peak is the most brilliant student in school, a genuine paragon with incredible intelligence and athletic skills unsurpassed by her peers, even in a top school. Unfortunately this has left her with an outsize ego, and her frustrated headmistress sends her to live with cousin Jenny and attend her school in order to learn some humility. Unfortunately for the long-suffering Jenny, Catherine's sense of superiority is well-earned and the girl frequently backs it up, coming out on top of any attempt to take her down a peg or two.

- Chiarolla drew the first storyline, Cambiotti the second.

=== Chairman Cherry ===
Published: 2 March 1968 to 5 September 1970
Artist: Colin Merritt

Filling in for her mother as a cleaner at the offices of Hartlands Ltd, Cherry Chick saves the life of CEO Mr. Hartland when he collapses in his office. As a result, he hands her control of the company when he dies. Despite Cherry's lack of business experience her upbeat personality and fresh ideas solve a great number of crises and boost the company's profile - usually at the expense of stuffy board members Mr. Coote and Mr. Moddle, who frequently try to get her to act more like a traditional businessperson.

- Also in Princess Tina Annual.

=== Clueless - The Blunderdog ===
Published: 18 March to 22 July 1972
Artist: John Richardson

Young girl Susie is under the impression her dog Clueless is a gifted super-hound. Beyond the mutt's ability to speak broken English it really isn't, though through a succession of misunderstandings and unlikely events Clueless invariably ends up solving whatever mystery is in front of him, reinforcing his oblivious owner's beliefs.

=== Daddy Long-Legs ===
Published: 5 October 1968 to 4 January 1969
Illustrator: Leslie Otway

- Text story, adaptation of the Jean Webster novel of the same name.

=== Dawn of the Islands ===
Published: 23 September 1967 to 24 February 1968
Artist: Franco Caprioli

Orphaned at a young age, Dawn Page grows up with her grandfather Captain Joshua Page, also known as Cap'n Josh. Together they do trading runs in the South Seas on board Cap'n Josh's sailboat The Sprite, aided by Dawn's talking parrot Jimbo. As well as ferrying supplies, the trio also help out in conflicts between the island people and other merchants.

- Continued from Tina.

=== Designed for... ===
Published: 18 March to 28 October 1972; 2 December to 10 February 1973; 3 March to 5 May 1973; 19 May to 20 October 1973
Artists: Vicente Torregrosa Manrique, Joan Boix

After moving to London and staying in a hostel while starting her career, Briony Andrews' fashion designs led to her working with fashion house Parkertex, and then taking her around the world and meeting various clients. Her resourcefulness and skill are portrayed as seeing her through mishaps.

- Manrique was the primary artist. The first arc (18 March to 10 June 1972) was titled "Designed for Fame"; the second (17 June to 12 August 1972) was "Designed for Danger"; the third and fourth (19 August to 28 October 1972 and 2 December to 10 February 1973) were both called "Designed for Romance"; the fifth (3 March to 5 May 1973) was "Designed for Royalty" and featured some pages by Boix; the sixth was "Designed for a Star" (19 May to 4 August 1973); and the seventh was "Designed for a Holiday" (11 August to 20 October 1973)

=== A Dog of Flanders ===
Published: 6 June to 18 May 1968
Illustrator: Giorgio Trevisan

- Text story, adaptation of the Marie Louise de la Ramée novel of the same name.

=== Dombey and Son ===
Published: 11 January to 21 June 1969
Illustrator: Colin Merritt

- Text story, adaptation of the Charles Dickens novel of the same name.

=== Doomed Village ===
Published: 11 November 1972 to 17 February 1973
Artists: Rafa Ramos

Doctor Davies quits work at a government biochemistry research station after baulking at the nature of his work. In response, he finds many doors closed to him and faces accusations of being a security risk, and the only work he can find is as a GP in the remote Cornish village of Belruan. His daughter Lyn is initially deeply unhappy with their rural home, but a succession of strange incidents make her begin to think there is more to Belruan than meets the eye.

=== The Egyptian Bracelet ===
Published: 26 August to 28 October 1972
Artist: Edmond Ripoll

Atonia Collins - Toni to her friends - is a prank-pulling tomboy, running around town causing chaos with her friend Sara and her cousin Mary. However, her life gets more complicated when her beloved teacher Miss Dawson returns from a year teaching abroad in Egypt - bringing back a strange bracelet with her.

=== Emma ===
Published: 28 April to 28 July 1973

Emma Farren negotiates life on the streets of Victorian London, juggling the twin occupations of flower-seller and waif.

=== Family Divided ===
Published: 26 August to 30 September 1972
Artist: Rodrigo Rodrígue Comos

With her parents separated, schoolgirl Angela Hardy spends alternating weekends with her parents. She strongly feels if they could just spend some time together their love can be rekindled, but finds them drifting further and further apart due to their busy jobs - her father as a reporter and her mother running a café, where she is regularly propositioned by a man called Larry.

=== The Fashion Girl's New Family ===
Published: 4 to 25 November 1972
Artist: Purita Campos

Model Tracy Jones visits Chester to see her mother's friend Mrs. Newley, only to find she has been hospitalised with nervous trouble. She had left her elder daughter Maggie in charge; Tracy volunteers to help her look after younger sister Pandora - known as Panda - but soon finds balancing the mischievous girl with her fashion career is no easy task.

=== Five Uncles for Fiona ===
Published: 20 January to 21 April 1973
Artists: Julio Vivas

When her father is injured in an industrial accident, Fiona Watkins' Midlands family are further impoverished. Her disconsolate father admits he has five brothers he has long lost contact with, and in an effort to get help for the family Fiona balances taking up a job as a maidservant to Lady Harrington-Hall of Melford with trying to trace her five uncles.

=== Freedom Island ===
Published: 29 April to 19 August 1972
Artists: Juan Solé Puyal

The United Nations sets up a school for the children of its officials on the idyllic Caribbean island of Fortuna. British girl Janey Peach and her friends are among the students, and put their wits to foiling various schemes to take over the island or the school for their own ends.

- Modified reprints of "The School in the Sun" from Tina.

=== The Girl Who Hated School ===
Published: 5 February to 11 March 1972
Artists: Rafa Ramos

The pupils of the unusual St. Myra's School - including Julie and Ann - are an adventurous lot and love the unique institution, which is located on a rocky island off the coast of Northumbria and gives plenty of scope for outdoors adventures and education. However, a new pupil - a rich girl who arrives by helicopter - is less enamoured with the rough-and-tumble of the place, and soon after she arrives a series of strange events happen, leading to Julie and Ann to work out the growing mystery.

=== The Happy Days ===
Published: 23 September 1967 to 16 June 1973
Writer: Jenny Butterworth
Artist: Andrew J. Wilson

Sue Day relates the madcap events that fill the life of the Day family - city-working Dad, apron-clad Mum, brother Sid, big sister and socially delicate Gloria, dog Rover and double whirlwinds of destruction The Twins, with occasional appearances from Sue's equally cheerful best friend Edie Potter and her brother Tommy.

- Continued from Princess. Also in Pixie, Princess Tina Annual, Princess Gift Book for Girls and Princess Picture Library (all even numbers to 1964, occasional 1964 to 1966).

=== Here Come the Space Girls ===
Published: 23 September to 28 October 1967
Artist: Keith Watson

In 2501 space travel is commonplace, with passenger voyages on space liners a popular method of transport. On board the huge X-77, which runs from Sardinia to Venus, are a trio of new air hostesses - Sally Trotter, Kathy Darling and Frances 'Fran' Finch. The girls soon end up on the wrong side of Captain Pepper - particularly the accident-prone Fran - but soon prove their worth, helping with a variety of difficult passengers and other crises.

- Continued from Tina. Full colour.

=== Horrid Hannah ===
Published: 30 June 1973 to 12 January 1974
Artists: Luis Bermejo

Nina Todd's perfect domestic life is turned upside-down when her father agrees to lodge his boss' daughter Hannah Brill. Despite Nina's high hopes that she will make friends with Hannah, the girl turns out to be a spoilt, ungrateful brat.

=== Jackie and the Wild Boys ===
Published: 23 September 1967 to 24 July 1971
Artist: Leo Davy

Jackie Jackson becomes the new singer for amateur pop band The Wild Boys (consisting of Danny on guitar, Tim on guitar and Chimp on guitar) and the group get into many adventures as they gig around the country in search of a big break, under the variable management of impresario Bob Biggles.

- Continued from Tina.

=== Jane Bond - Secret Agent ===
Published: 23 September 1967 to 28 February 1970
Artist: Mike Hubbard

Jane Bond isn't just the average American-born, Italian-educated globetrotting socialite, model and racing driver but in fact the top agent of international crimefighting organisation WorldPol, with her international jet-setting just a cover for the missions assigned to her by chief Colonel Merrill.

- Continued from Tina.

=== Jeff ===
Published: 8 July to 19 August 1972; 25 November 1972 to 31 March 1973; 4 August 1973 to 12 January 1974
Artists: Purita Campos, Carlos Laffond, Michael Strand

Born with pointy ears for some reason, schoolboy artist Jeff is nicknamed "the Demon King" by bullies at school and gets blamed when various things go wrong as others begin to suspect he has some sort of strange powers. However, a girl called Jill - bullied because of her freckles - realises he is really a kind, thoughtful soul and the pair set out to show the rest of the school there is more to them. Jeff later carves a successful career writing for teenage magazines.

- Initially titled "Jeff - They Call Him the Demon King" before later being shortened to simply "Jeff". Purita Campos was initially the main artist, with Laffond and Strand taing over for the final arc.

=== Jinny Below Stairs ===
Published: 18 March to 1 July 1972
Artists: Julio Vivas

East End orphan Jinny Blake hopes to earn her keep by taking on a job as a maid in the household of Sir George Ringstead, a kindly aristocrat. However, Jinny unfortunately and inadvertently makes an enemy of butler Dawes when her faithful dog Spottie bites him. Told to get rid of her pet, Jinny instead hides him in a disused stable - and soon finds there may be a darker side of Dawes beyond his bullying.

=== King of the Castle ===
Published: 19 December 1970 to 6 March 1971
Author: Carol Vaughan
Illustrator: Santiago Hernandez Martin

- Text story, serialisation of the novel of the same name.

=== King Sam ===
Published: 7 March to 11 July 1970
Author: Vian Smith

- Text story, serialisation of the novel of the same name.

=== Laura and the Legend of Hadley House ===
Published: 25 October 1969 to 9 May 1970
Writer: Betty Roland
Artist: Dudley Pout

Laura King travels to the coast of Kent to live with her uncle, Captain Matthew Pringle, in Hadley House. She arrives to find him long absent while the household staff are evasive and secretive. Laura determines to find out exactly what has happened to her uncle.

- Modified reprint of "Laura and the Secret of Hadley House" from Girl.

=== Life with Tina ===
Published: 25 November 1967 to 10 March 1973
Artist: Bill Baker, Cándido Pueyo

Tina helps out at her father's business agency, getting sent to work in all manner of strange jobs.

- Tina had first appeared as the fictional host of Tina, a role she continued for Princess Tina. From November 1971 the strip was given a makeover and renamed "Tina Aims for the Top!", with art by Pueyo, and followed an older Tina attempting to make a career in business, working her way up the rungs of Vulcan Oil.
- Also in Princess Tina Annual.

=== Marie Curie ===
Published: 17 August to 7 December 1968
Writer: Chad Varah
Artist: Gerry Haylock

The life and times of pioneering scientist Marie Curie.

- Reprint from Girl.

=== Milly the Merry Mermaid ===
Published: 2 March 1968 to 11 March 1972

Young mermaid Milly helps out swimmers and marine wildlife in peril while occasionally breaking the fourth wall.

- Also in Princess Tina Annual.

=== Moira, Slave Girl of Rome ===
Published: 23 September 1967 to 1 March 1969
Artist: Alberto Salinas

When her chieftain father is defeated during the invasion of Britain, Moira is taken into the household of Julius Caesar, along with the gigantic, loyal Thorkil. As Caesar is frequently away on campaigns, Moira effectively works for a Roman lady called Livia, who is fair - if occasionally short-tempered and spoilt. Moira makes fast friends with others in Rome, including the kindly artisans Erik and Jon. She harbours hope of escape, but frequently finds herself pulled into plots by various Roman nobles against her Caesar and her friends that Moira cannot allow to come to pass.

- Continued from Tina.

=== My Chum Yum-Yum ===
Published: 23 September 1967 to 4 July 1970
Writer: Ron Clark
Artists: Jean Sidobre

Brenda Burns is the daughter of an immigrant businessman in Hong Kong. Among the staff at their huge house is Yum-Yum, a pint-size clod who speaks broken English. Despite her endless impulsive, crass, insulting mannerisms Yum-Yum's unflinching loyalty soon sees her become the rich white girl's comedy sidekick.

- Continued from Tina.

=== Nita Nobody ===
Published: 28 June 1968 to 29 November 1969; 26 September 1970 to 20 February 1971
Artist: Jorge Moliterni, Franco Paludetti

Growing up in an orphanage, Nita traces her mother - eventually finding she is the glamorous film star Felicity Dawn. She soon finds the transition from live as an orphan to the daughter of a celebrity isn't as easy as she had thought.

- The first arc, drawn by Moliterni, was titled "Nita Nobody"; the second was "Nita's Lonely Quest", drawn by Paludetti. A one-off story, "Nita's Race Against Time", appeared in the 1972 Princess Tina Summer Extra special.

=== No Swimming Allowed! ===
Published: 18 March to 1 July 1972
Artists: Santiago Hernandez Martin

Sisters Fenny and Alison Philips return to Hillside Boarding School after the summer holidays with a determination to beat rivals Hill Grammar and clinch the Junior Swimming Trophy/ However, the machinations of new prefect Hester Smythe seemingly see their hopes dashed when the bitter, power-crazed girl talks headmistress Miss Fell into banning swimming at the school. Undaunted, the Philips girls are determined to train in secret.

=== No Time for Tricia ===
Published: 4 November to 30 December 1972
Artists: Santiago Hernandez Martin

When her father lands a new job, Tricia Treen is forced to leave her friends in the city behind when the family move to the country. The pleasant Tricia is eager to fit in with the locals but her father's new job and their huge new house have gone to her mother's head, and the overbearing parent insists Tricia only make friends among "the best people". Her overbearing upwardly-mobile persona soon alienates most of the children in the village, and the hapless Tricia soon finds herself an outcast as a result.

=== Paris Runaway ===
Published: 14 October to 18 November 1972

Talented artist Katy Cooper wins a cash prize for her work. Her father wants her to bank the money but her mother is more sympathetic to her dreams to study art abroad, and encourages Katy to put it towards a scholarship at a prestigious art college in Paris. However, soon after arriving in France a series of misfortunes see her left broke and unable to get home.

=== Patty's World ===
Published: 31 July 1971 to 12 January 1974
Writer: Phillip Douglas
Artists: Purita Campos

Patty Lucas is 13 years old and must negotiate the usual adolescent hurdles of school, fashion and social interaction. Surrounding Patty are her mother, her police officer stepfather, her dramatic older sister Carol, her best friend Sharon and her perennial crush Johnny Vowden.

- Continued in Pink, Mates and Girl, and widely exported - in Spain it was retitled Esther.

=== Penny in the Sun ===
Published: 14 April to 8 September 1973
Artists: Luis Bermejo

On holiday in Mallorca, Penny Jones helps an old man. To the surprise of the Jones family, the man turns out to be a hotelier and leaves his business to Penny when he passes some years later. She refuses her parents' suggestion that they sell the hotel, and instead sets off to Spain to run the business with her best friend Jill.

=== Penny on Her Own ===
Published: 27 December 1969 to 19 September 1970
Artist: Frank Langford

Having finished school, Penny Ward lives on her own in modest circumstances, helping friends and pondering her next career move.

- A prequel story featuring Lady Penelope of the Gerry Anderson TV series Thunderbirds, continued from Penelope. Also in Princess Tina Summer Extra 1971 and Princess Tina Annual 1972, drawn by Pat Williams.

=== Peril in the Snow ===
Published: 22 January to 5 February 1972
Artist: Edmond Ripoll

Gwen Simmons' family moves from Bristol to Llanechan Valley in Wales, where her father is running a doctor's surgery. She is out riding her beloved pony Roberta to check on a remote patient when the pair fall and her mount is injured; caught in a sudden blizzard, Gwen must get herself and Roberta to safety before the weather overwhelms them.

=== Problem Pony ===
Published: 18 March to 24 June 1972
Artists: Santiago Hernandez Martin

Aspiring rider Hazel Green's family cannot afford her the pony she desires until a band of gipsies offers her a pony called Flame for a pittance. She eagerly accepts, and Flame is homed on the Greens' tenant farm. However, Flame soon turns out to have an odd quirk - he only allows himself to be ridden in the presence of a stray dog called Dodger. Her father believes Dodger will worry his sheep and forbids Hazel from having the dog around, leaving her to ride in secret while she tries to persuade her family that Dodger is harmless.

=== Ross, Student Nurse ===
Published: 21 March 1970 to 9 September 1972
Writer: Anne Digby
Artist: Colin Merritt

Janet Ross is a student nurse at Selwick Hospital, and is often bullied by her harridan superior Nurse Hicks. Despite this she keeps up a sunny disposition and helps her varied patients, with a particular nose for solving petty crimes.

=== The Secret Garden ===
Published: 13 January to 30 March 1968
Artist: Giorgio Trevisan

- Adaptation of the Frances Hodgson Burnett novel of the same name.

=== Sister to a Soccer Star ===
Published: 11 July 1970
Artists: Santiago Hernandez Martin

Kevin King is a gifted footballer, and lands a contract with Camfield Athletic. However, his playing skills are directly inverse to his intelligence. His sister Lindy is smart and looks after his affairs, keeping Kevin out of trouble.

- Also in Princess Tina Annual 1973.

=== Super-Girl Sandra ===
Published: 8 March 1969 to 7 November 1970
Artists: Alberto Salinas, Tony Higham

Sandra, a native of Mercury, lands on Earth to find out more about the human race. She has incredible abilities, being able to cause almost anything to happen with just a thought. Soon after arriving she makes fast friends with young Earth girl Claire Conway, who tries to teach her about Earth - though Sandra's well-intentioned use of her powers to help others often causes problems.

- Also in Princess Tina Annual 1970 and 1975 to 1977.

=== Tessa and the Time People ===
Published: 24 February to 7 April 1973
Artists: Edmond Ripoll

Tessa Regan joins a group of fellow students on a summer holiday moorland trek but her hopes of an enjoyable hike are spoilt by the battle-axe track leader Miss Marriner. Fed up with the domineering old hag, Tessa slips away from the group - and finds herself in another world.

=== Three's a Crowd ===
Published: 12 May to 23 June 1973

Arriving to view a bedsit flat, Wendy Baker and Gilly Smith find another girl has already taken it. The landlady offers the pair a chance to share another room together, and all three soon find themselves in competition for both living space and the attention of the fourth tenant, a dishy fella.

=== The Trolls ===
Published: 23 September 1967 to 11 March 1972
Artist: Hugh McNeill

An amiable family of four diminutive trolls attempt to live in peace in the countryside. However, greedy farmer Snurge and his idiot son spot them and become obsessed with capturing them, coming up with a variety of schemes to do so - which uniformly backfire.

- Based on the popular figures. Continued from Tina.

=== Twinkle, Twinkle, Daisy Starr! ===
Published: 23 September to 28 October 1972; 6 January to 24 February 1973; 15 September to 3 November 1972
Artists: Jesus Redondo

Growing up in an orphanage, Daisy Starr greatly wants to be a successful entertainer and celebrity. However, the welfare office finds her a much blander posting and she is forced to shelve her dreams for the time being. She does later gain employment as an assistant stage manager in a seaside theatre, and works hard at her job while waiting for her lucky break.

=== Vicky in Australia ===
Published: 16 May to 7 November 1970
Writer: Betty Roland
Artist: Dudley Pout

Vicky and her father, Professor Curtis, visit Australia to stay with family friends at the Murundi cattle station. She finds that the Drew family have been targeted by local schemer Felix Frost, who wants the farm for himself, and works with Diana Drew to end his machinations.

- Modified reprint of the Vicky story "Australian Adventure" from Girl.

=== Westward the Wagons ===
Published: 23 September 1967 to 21 June 1969
Artist: Jorge Moliterni

On an under protected wagon train bound for California, the resourceful Glory Gold takes on the role of chief scout. She is aided by grizzled veteran Old Ned Nickless and Pawnee warrior Young Hawk as the convoy makes its way across the dangerous wilderness, fending off raiders and solving disputes among the travellers, usually led by the cantankerous Caleb Batt.

- Continued from Tina.

=== Willy the Wily Wolf ===
Published: 23 September 1967 to 6 May 1972
Artist: Hugh McNeill

An anthropomorphic wolf constantly comes up with schemes to get copious amounts of free food - usually with disastrous results for himself and anyone else unfortunate enough to get caught up in things.

- Humour cartoon. Continued from Tina.

=== The Wizard of Oz ===
Published: 23 September 1967 to 6 January 1968
Illustrator: Giorgio Trevisan

- Text story, adaptation of the L. Frank Baum novel The Wonderful Wizard of Oz.

=== The Wolves of Verdina ===
Published: 19 August to 2 December 1972
Artist: Franco Paludetti

After time away at school in Rome, Rosina Trenti returns home to her family in the small Southern Italian village of Verdina as her father is in financial trouble. With her mother dead, he is unable to afford childcare for younger siblings Teresa and Mario. Rosina is initially delighted to be home, but soon finds her father acting oddly and begins to suspect he isn't being entirely truthful with her.

== One-off stories ==
- The Big Jump

Published: 17 August 1968

- Holiday in Venice

Published: 24 August 1968

- Journey to Danger

Published: 31 August 1968

- The Go-Between

Published: 2 January 1970

- Warrior's Child

Published: 9 January 1971

- Into the Light!

Published: 16 January 1971

- We Must Save the Animals!

Published: 23 January 1971

- Flight Through Peril

Published: 6 February 1971

- Girl of Two Worlds

Published: 20 February 1971

- Dark Pit of Peril

Published: 13 March 1971

- Pigtail Paula

Published: 20 March 1971

- One Morning in the Market

Published: 27 March 1971

- More Than a Prize at Stake

Published: 3 April 1971

- A Pony for Kate

Published: 10 April 1971

- Time to Catch a Thief

Published: 17 April 1971

- No Tears for Teresa

Published: 24 April 1971

- Odd Girl Out

Published: 1 May 1971

- Peggy Makes Strong Magic

Published: 8 May 1971

- The Medicine Man

Published: 22 May 1971

- Speedwell's Lucky Mascot

Published: 29 May 1971

- The Girls of Peaceful Creek

Published: 5 June 1971

- Clothes by Amanda

Published: 19 June 1971

- Nagoona of the North

Published: 26 June 1971

- Girl of the Timberland

Published: 3 July 1971

- Greta's Fate

Published: 17 July 1971

- Delicate Delia

Published: 24 July 1971

- The Fun Fair Rivals

Published: 31 July 1971

- Don't Eat Those Sweets

Published: 7 August 1971

- Will o' the Woods

Published: 21 August 1971

- Combat by Night

Published: 28 August 1971

- Big Treasure, Little Treasure

Published: 4 September 1971

- Valley of Danger

Published: 11 September 1971

- Hands Up!

Published: 25 September 1971

- Wild Horses of Scarne

Published: 2 October 1971

- Pickpocket Pam

Published: 9 October 1971

- Danger - Guard Dog!

Published: 27 October 1971

- Riches to Rags

Published: 4 December 1971

- Back Home to Heartache

Published: 1 January 1972

- The Badger-Watchers

Published: 15 January 1972

- Fenella's Fear

Published: 15 January 1972

- Winning Isn't Everything

Published: 22 January 1972

- The Telly Babies

Published: 29 January 1972

- The Stars and Sally Green

Published: 5 February 1972

- The Little Maid

Published: 12 February 1972

- Rescue in Shameria

Published: 19 February 1972

- The Warrior

Published: 26 February 1972

- Belina's Biggest Enemy

Published: 4 March 1972

- Danger Doll

Published: 11 March 1972

- The Secret

Published: 18 March 1972

- Do You Believe in the Little Folk?

Published: 25 March 1972

- Scruffyanne

Published: 1 April 1972

- Changes

Published: 8 April 1972

- Laddie

Published: 15 April 1972

- My Brother

Published: 22 April 1972

- Anna Can Manage

Published: 29 April 1972

- Goodbye, Jenny

Published: 6 May 1972

- Janey

Published: 27 May 1972

- The Dog

Published: 3 June 1972

- Ice-creams

Published: 10 June 1972

- Luke

Published: 17 June 1972

- Togetherness

Published: 22 July 1972

- The Happy House

Published: 29 July 1972

- Snooty

Published: 2 September 1972

- Blackberry Pie

Published: 16 September 1972

- Open Another Door

Published: 23 September 1972

- Tricky

Published: 30 September 1972

- The Loser

Published: 7 October 1972

- The Painter

Published: 14 October 1972

- The Paris Runaway

Published: 21 October 1972

- Before and After

Published: 28 October 1972

- Country Girl

Published: 4 November 1972

- First Love

Published: 9 December 1972

- Let's Pretend

Published: 16 December 1972

- Christmas Carole

Published: 23 December 1972

- Cinderella, a Christmas Story

Published: 30 December 1972

- Race You

Published: 6 January 1973

- Home Game

Published: 13 January 1973

- Cupid Was a Pigeon

Published: 17 February 1973

- The Gypsy Rock

Published: 24 February 1973

- Brother, Dear Brother

Published: 3 March 1973

- A Pleasant Surprise

Published: 10 March 1973

- All That Glitters

Published: 17 March 1973

- The House in the Woods

Published: 7 April 1973

- My Sister, Sarah

Published: 14 April 1973

- Dad's Difficult Daughter

Published: 21 April 1973

- Carol

Published: 28 April 1973

- The Summer Cottage

Published: 5 May 1973

- The Ghostly Piper

Published: 23 June 1973

- After School

Published: 8 September 1973

- Last Year Was Different

Published: 17 November 1973

- The Saddest, Happiest Birthday of All

Published: 24 November 1973

- The Girl Against the Sky

Published: 8 December 1973

- A Dream Called Debbie

Published: 15 December 1973

- Oh, for the Great Outdoors

Published: 22 December 1973

- Shadows on a Christmas Morning

Published: 29 December 1973

- No Boys for Debbie

Published: 5 January 1974

- This Girl Rosalie

Published: 12 January 1974
