= Princess (comics) =

British weekly girls' publication

- The cover of the first issue of Princess, dated 30 January 1960.

Publication information
- Publisher: Fleetway Publications; 1960 to 1967
- Schedule: Weekly (Mondays)
- Format: Ongoing series
- Publication date: 30 January 1960 – 16 September 1967
- No. of issues: 399
- Editor(s): Trevor Martin

Princess (also known as Princess and Girl and Princess Magazine) was a British weekly girls' comic anthology published by Fleetway Publications and, later, IPC Magazines. The first version was published between 30 January 1960 and 16 September 1967, (Note: British comics of the time featured their off sale date on the cover) and featured a mix of comic strips, text stories and a large proportion of features; it was merged with Tina to form a new title - Princess Tina - after 399 issues.

== Creation ==
The Mirror Group took over Amalgamated Press in 1959, reorganising the comics titles into Fleetway Publications. Leonard Matthews, an experienced AP staffer with some twenty years experience on the company's comics and story papers, was Managing Editor at the time and his hope of creating a line of high-quality 'respectable' comics resounded with the new owners. Matthews wanted to emulate Hulton Press' Eagle and Girl by aiming firmly at the middle class with high production values and educational content, in contrast to AP's 1950s ethos of making cheap comics that undercut rivals. With the company's girls comics - School Friend and Girls' Crystal - buckling under the challenge of DC Thomson's Bunty it was decided that a girls' title would be a good starting point. (Note: Matthews would later conceive the long-running educational title Look and Learn and the less enduring 'boys magazine' Ranger under the same initiative.)

The 24-page Princess was printed in photogravure throughout, with a photographic cover and a high level of both factual content (much of it illustrated either by photographs or lavish illustrations) and prose stories, beginning with serialisations featuring Enid Blyton's Famous Five (later rotating with The Secret Seven) and an adaptation of Lorna Doone. Meanwhile, Marjorie Coryn - who had written respected books on the likes of Joséphine de Beauharnais, Louis XIV and Edward the Black Prince - was engaged to write features on historical ladies, "Famous Royal Daughters" and the fictional "Daughters of Adventure", illustrated by the distinguished John Millar Watt. The first issue covered Isabella of Valois; later subjects included the likes of Eleanor of Aquitaine, Marie Mancini, Catherine the Great and Elizabeth I.

To reflect that much of the intended readership would have private ballet lessons, Mike Davis was engaged as the title's full-time ballet photographer, travelling the country to capture various companies, with the pictures printed in colour in the comic, while showjumper Pat Smythe penned "Pat's Page" on horses. It also included a fashion page and, on the back cover, pet photographs framed with poetry. The overall appearance was closer to a magazine than a comic, something reflected in the price - 5d - a fully penny more than the company's other weekly girls' comics. The overall look was a clear appeal to the sophisticated middle-class.

The comic strip content consisted of "Circus Ballerina" (written by Ron "Nobby" Clark and drawn by Bill Lacey), orphan saga "Pam and Peter", "Tess of the Texas Moon" and "The Happy Days". The latter - written by Jenny Butterworth (the wife of stalwart Mike Butterworth, and a talented writer who had contributed numerous stories to the company's romance titles, most notably the highly successful Valentine), and drawn by Andrew Wilson - depicted the domestic life of the Day family, narrated by youngest daughter Sue. Freckled, innocent, relentlessly cheerful and with a trace of Richmal Crompton's Just William, Sue was instantly popular with readers, as were the Days. Despite being firmly middle-class, the Days in general struck a chord with a wide number of readers, and the strip would outlast Princess itself.

== Publishing history ==
=== Princess (30 January 1960 to 3 October 1964) ===
In addition to this, the first issue included a bracelet as a free gift, and Princess launched well despite its price with The Economist describing it as "a marked success".

In autumn the title was joined by the hardback Princess Gift Book for Girls - the name annual being eschewed in line with the publication's posher target market. In 1961 another satellite title was launched - Princess Picture Library followed the standard Picture Library format of 64 pages in a pocket-sized format, and featured alternating full-length adventures of Sue from "The Happy Days" and Sally Doyle of "Circus Ballerina". Further new strips arrived, including "Lucia and the Golden Mermaid" (illustrated by Italian artist Guido Buzzelli) and "Nurse Angela" (drawn by Mike Hubbard), the first of several nursing-themed stories. November 1961 also saw the comic achieve the coup of a series of columns by Godfrey Winn, then one of the country's most popular writers, while David Attenborough posted travelogue pieces.

March 1962 saw a relaunch, with a free 'Pat Smythe Pony Booklet' to tie in with the rider penning strip "Molly Must Not Ride" inside. The following year saw an adaptation of "The Children of the New Forest", lavishly illustrated in painted colour by Ron Embleton, though the long-running Sally Doyle hung up her ballet shoes as "Circus Ballerina" finished. In 1963 the title had a circulation of 508,000.

=== New Princess and Girl and Princess and Girl (10 October 1964 to 2 January 1965) ===
The Mirror Group had also taken over Odhams Press, causing the unusual situation of one of Fleetway's main competitors simultaneously being a sister company under the same owners. The acquisition put the Eagle group of comics under the Mirror Group umbrella, and while their circulations had fallen since their 1950s heyday the weeklies still commanded respectable sales. However, the board disliked the high production costs of the comics, and assigned Matthews to instigate cuts. In 1963, junior title Swift was folded into Eagle, and in 1964 it was the turn of Girl. Launched in 1951 in response to AP's School Friend, Girl had weathered a rocky start before hitting its stride, and was still selling around 360,000 weekly copies at the time, but in 1964 was merged with Princess as New Princess and Girl. This saw ballet serial "Belle and Mamie" as well as cartoons "Lettice" and "Minx and Her Friend Dennis" join, and for four issues the comic was renamed New Princess and Girl before settling down to Princess and Girl, dropping the Girl part altogether after the first issue of 1965.

Princess and Girl would debut Amber Ridd - "Daughter of Lorna Doone" - in a succession of period stories, luxuriously illustrated by Clive Uptton, and the antics of "Alona — The Wild One"; the latter was especially popular, and would live on beyond Princess. The character was partly inspired by market research where some readers had bemoaned the lack of jeopardy involved in Princess stories. There was also an abridgement of J. R. R. Tolkien's The Hobbit, which the retired but still usually meticulous writer took little interest in. The comic reverted to its own name again in January 1965, and notable features included historical romance "The Golden Talisman", written by the novelist Sylvia Thorpe - with Henry Seabright employed to keep up the comic's reputation for high-quality artwork.

=== Princess Magazine and Princess Magazine with My Magazine ===
Another relaunch followed with the 16 October 1965 issue, where the title was rebranded as Princess Magazine. The new look saw an expansion to 32 pages (as well as a price increase to 9d.), as well as the Lewis Carroll-inspired text comic "Alice in Spaceland", written by Australian children's novelist Mary Elwyn Patchett, entertainment page "Moira's Notice Board", a column written by legendary dancer Martha Graham, an adaptation of Mary Poppins (at a time the film version was in British cinemas) and "My Magazine", a new section where readers were encouraged to submit "stories, articles, sketches, photographs, poems or paintings"; the section would join the banner of the comic from November, when reader submissions - typically of exotic overseas holidays and occasionally parades - began to appear.

=== Princess (5 November 1966 to 16 September 1967) ===
Despite the relaunch, sales were beginning to fall and in 1966 Princess' circulation fell below the threshold needed to make photogravure printing profitable, and the 5 November 1966 edition saw a move to web offset printing - still a relatively high-quality system for a British weekly of the time, though this saw the abandonment of photo covers in favour of cover art. The new style was naturally pitched as a boon for readers but the previous high-quality works by the likes of Coryn and Thorpe were replaced with the rote-written "Famous Romances", the celebrity columns vanished and photographs were reduced to the occasional agency ballet shots or the 'Princess Star Gallery'. More concerningly, a large number of reprints began to appear, largely pulled from Girl (including "Belle of the Ballet" being redressed as "Lyndy of Latymer Grange") and even older issues of Princess itself.

The year 1967 also saw Fleetway launch new girls' weekly Tina. Intended to catch the zeitgeist of Emma Peel, The Girl from U.N.C.L.E. and with an eye on lucrative European syndication rights (on the continent), action girls in comics, the title sold poorly as British girls reacted poorly to its action-orientated heroines. With Princess also performing below expectations, Fleetway decided to merge them both to create a new title, Princess Tina, made up of the most popular parts of both comics. Unlike more typical mergers, where one title would continue with the other effectively subsumed, Princess Tina would start as a new comic and as such was advertised extensively as the separate Princess and Tina wound down. Jane Bond and the Trolls both appeared in Princess (with Sue Day and Alona making a return trip to make sure they were known to Tina readers) while both titles started an adaptation of The Wizard of Oz that would be continued in the new comic. Princess and Tina both published their final issues in the week ending 16 September 1967, with Princess Tina launching the following Monday. It would run until 1973. The Princess Giftbook for Girls however continued to be published, appearing alongside Princess Tina Annual every autumn until 1976.

The Princess name was revived for a comic published by Fleetway's successor IPC Magazines between 24 September 1983 and 31 March 1984, which bore no relation to the original beyond the name. It lasted for just 28 issues before merging with Tammy.

Since 2018, the material featured in Princess has been owned by Rebellion Publishing.

== Titles ==
- Princess (30 January 1960 to 3 October 1964)
- New Princess and Girl (10 October 1964 to 2 January 1965)
- Princess (9 January to 9 October 1965)
- Princess Magazine (16 October 1965 to 29 October 1966)
- Princess (5 November 1966 to 16 September 1967)

== Spin-offs ==
- Princess Giftbook for Girls (16 editions, 1961 to 1976) (Note: British annuals were typically issued in the autumn of the year preceding that on the cover)
- Princess Picture Library (188 editions, 1961 to 1966)
- Princess Holiday Special (1 edition, 1964)
