= Caprioli (surname) =

Caprioli is an Italian surname. Notable people with the surname include:

- Adriano Caprioli (1936–2026), Italian Roman Catholic bishop
- Aliprando Caprioli, Italian engraver
- Anita Caprioli (born 1973), Italian theatre and film actress
- Domenico Caprioli (1494–1528), Italian painter
- Franco Caprioli (1912–1974), Italian cartoonist
- Robert Caprioli (born 1967), Australian footballer
- Vittorio Caprioli (1921–1989), Italian film actor, director and screenwriter

== See also ==
- Capriolo, town in Lombardy
- Caprioli, village in Campania
- Gerre de' Caprioli, municipality in Lombardy
