= Princess Tina =

British weekly girls' comic

- The cover of Princess Tina, dated 7 August 1971. Art by Purita Campos.

Publication information
- Publisher: Fleetway Publications; 1967 to 1969; IPC Magazines; 1969 to 1973
- Schedule: Weekly (Mondays)
- Format: Ongoing series
- Publication date: 23 September 1967 – 12 January 1974
- No. of issues: 328 or 330

Creative team
- Written by: Jenny Butterworth; Phillip Douglas
- Artist(s): Bill Baker; Purita Campos; Leo Davy; Michael Hubbard; Hugh McNeill; Colin Merrett; Edmond Fernández Ripoll; Andrew Wilson
- Editor(s): John Sanders; Desmond Pride; John Wagner

Princess Tina (also known as Princess Tina and Penelope and Tina at various points) was a British weekly girls' comic anthology published by Fleetway Publications and IPC Magazines from 23 September 1967 to 12 January 1974. (Note: British comics of the time featured their off-sale date on the cover.) The comic was created by combining two underperforming Fleetway titles — Princess and Tina — into a third, new comic. Notable strips included the long-running family drama "The Happy Days" and "Patty's World". The latter would outlive Princess Tina, continuing after the comic was merged into Pink.

== Creation ==
Princess Tina was a novel solution to problems being faced by two Fleetway girls' comics. Princess had launched strongly in 1960 but falling sales had seen it lose its magazine-style photogravure printing, and with it much of its aspirational middle-class readership. Tina meanwhile had been launched as an action-orientated comic made for European syndication but some of Fleetway's partners had dropped out, and the British sales of the comic were not enough to prop it up — though it remained a bestseller in the Netherlands.

British girls had not warmed to the action heroines of Tina — audience research used terms such as "too macho" and "too masculine" to describe them — and so a plan was made by John Sanders, editor of Tina and protégé of Director of Juvenile Publications Leonard Matthews, to effectively combine them with the most popular elements of Princess. This would it was hoped result in a publication palatable to both British and continental readers, and see Fleetway replace two struggling comics with a single strong seller — halving the high production costs of the titles into the bargain.

Readers of both titles were prepared extensively for the merge; Princess stories "The Happy Days" and "Alona — The Wild One" appeared in Tina, while "Jane Bond - Secret Agent" and "The Trolls" featured in Princess. Alongside these an adaptation of The Wizard of Oz was printed in both simultaneously, to be continued in Princess Tina. Due to the need to appease Fleetway's European partners (particularly Dutch publishers Spaarnestad, who were printing 100,000 copies of Tina a week as the title became the Netherlands' best selling comic) the merge was asymmetrical. From the pages of Tina came "Barbie the Model Girl", "Here Come the Space Girls", "Jackie and the Wild Boys", "Jane Bond — Secret Agent", "Moira, Slave Girl of Rome", "My Chum Yum-Yum", "The Trolls", "Westward the Wagons" and "Willy the Wily Wolf". By comparison, Princess only contributed "Alona — The Wild One" and "The Happy Days"; instead it would be more strongly felt in the new comic's features, which continued Mike Davies' ballet photography in "Princess Tina Ballet". The result was that to international partners the comic looked like Tina with a couple of new additions.

== Publishing history ==
=== Princess Tina ===
The first issue of Princess Tina was 32 pages, and cost 8d. The comic retained the high production values of its forebears, with web offset printing, a painted colour cover, eight pages of interior colour and two further pages with a colour overlay. In addition to the ballet pages, the comic contained two other prestige features — "Famous Royal Daughters" detailed the likes of Helen of Troy and Letizia Bonaparte with painted illustrations by John Millar Watt, while Eric Tansley regaled readers with information on "Nature's Oddities". Covers were contributed by the likes of Audrey Fawley, Walter Lambert and Manfred Sommer.

The end of October 1967 saw "Here Come the Space Girls" end; it was replaced by "Life with Tina", a good-natured slice-of-life story fronted by the magazine's fictional host and editor Tina. After the conclusion of "The Wizard of Oz" further adaptations followed, including The Secret Garden and Lassie Come-Home. The standard churn saw a makeover as the comic approached six months and reader feedback began to filter in; "Dawn of the Islands" finished and was replaced by the girl tycoon "Chairman Cherry" while "Milly the Merry Mermaid" joined Willy in the humour department. "Famous Royal Daughters" meanwhile was replaced by "Stories That Live Forever", which saw Watt illustrate famous scenes from classic literature.

With continuing good business overseas, Princess Tina was in better health than its forebears, though to keep costs down in May 1968 "Anna at the Court of Siam" began a series of reprints from the archives of Girl. June 1968 introduced "Nita Nobody", about an orphan hunting for her mother; the character proved popular enough that even after she found her mother (who turned out to be a glamorous film star) in 1969 she would return for a second arc in 1970. Later in the year the comic also debuted "Cooking with Cookie", where the namesake character dispensed recipes for French cheese pudding, raspberry surprise, stuffed savoury eggs and other culinary delights.

1969 saw "Moira, Slave Girl of Rome" finally escape from captivity and Princess Tina, instead being replaced by Mercurian "Super-Girl Sandra". While sales were still robust, Fleetway were growing aware of the rise of the so-called 'tweeny-bopper' as readers stopped waiting for their teens before becoming obsessed with pop music. In the 3 May 1969 edition Scots singer Lulu would be the subject of the first "Pops with Tina", which would go on to feature such greats of the age as Harmony Grass, The Marmalade, The Family Dogg and Edison Lighthouse.

=== Princess Tina and Penelope ===
Behind the scenes, the owners of Fleetway were gradually trying to streamline the multiple publishers it owned into what would become IPC Magazines, and the end of the year saw Princess Tina merge with Penelope — formerly Lady Penelope, one of City Magazines' Gerry Anderson-based titles. With the twin flops of Joe 90 and The Secret Service signalling the end of the sixties puppet craze there was little of the comic left to be incorporated, and only strip "Penny on Her Own" would continue into what would be named Princess Tina and Penelope until May 1970.

=== Princess Tina ===
By the time the title returned to Princess Tina, "Jane Bond — Secret Agent" and "Alona — The Wild One" had also finished. The latter was replaced by the judgemental interference of "Ross, Student Nurse", though better news would come when "My Chum Yum-Yum" finally stopped in July 1970. It was replaced by the unusual territory of a football-related strip, "Sister to a Soccer Star". Autumn saw another move towards magazine territory with the addition of "Meet the Stars", a succession of features on glitterati including Susan Hampshire, Derren Nesbitt, Eric Flynn, Judas Jump and Blue Mink.

In July 1971 the long-running "Jackie and the Wild Boys" concluded, to be replaced by "Patty's World". The freckled 13-year old Patty — forever in the shadow of good-looking best friend Sharon, squabbling with date-crazy big sister Carol and failing to land a date with crush Johnny Vowden — struck a cord with readers for her candid, down-to-earth personality. Wittily written by Phillip Douglas and illustrated by Purita Campos (a talented artist who painted many of Princess Tina's covers), "Patty's World" rapidly overhauled "The Happy Days" as a reader favourite. The strip was also a hugely popular export, notably in Campos' native Spain where Patty was renamed Esther. As well as "Patty's World" and the covers, Campos would also illustrate clothes column "Fashion Conscious" (written by Linda Semark) when it joined Princess Tina in November 1971. At the same time "Life with Tina" was overhauled as the more modern "Tina Aims for the Top!" as Tina finished working for her father's employment agency and started a more independent career.

The following month the long-running Barbie strip finished. Change was by now sweeping through IPC's girls' comic division under the auspices of John Purdy, who brought in new writers — notably the prolific former DC Thomson writers Pat Mills and John Wagner. To fit in better with the likes of Tammy and Sandie, Princess Tina was given a shake-up in March 1972. "The Trolls" was retired; Patty, Sue Day and still-learning Janet Ross continued but were joined by a more contemporary group of characters — including fashion designer Briony Andrews, modern school drama "No Swimming Allowed!", historical domestic misery "Jinny Below Stairs" and pigtailed monster "Catherine Arrogant". The cover also saw the 'Princess' part of the title shrink considerably. The last survivor of the Tina intake — "Willy the Wily Wolf" — ended in May 1972, to be replaced by "Just Jenny", while a succession of plucky heroines and domestic dramas joined the comic — including "Doomed Village", "Candy's No Lady!", "Five Uncles for Fiona" and "Tessa and the Time People".

=== Tina ===
January 1973 saw the title officially reduced to simply Tina; later in the year, two of the longest-running features came to an end, with "Tina Aims for the Top!" finishing in March, with "The Happy Days" finishing its 13-year run in June. By now the comic was caught between the likes of Tammy and Sandie, and the growing success of magazine-comic hybrids like Pink, Mirabelle and DC Thomson's Jackie. In July, Tina made a pitch for the latter market with the number of comic strips scaled back, and the painted front cover was replaced by photographs of popstars. The move was not a success, and after the 12 January 1974 edition it was incorporated into Pink. Wagner had risen to edit the title by this stage along with Sandie, and both were cancelled at around the same time, something the writer would wryly joke about in later interviews, noting about Princess Tina that "I really did mess that one right up."

== Legacy ==
"Patty's World" would outlive not only Princess Tina but also Pink and its next home Mates, and appear in Girl until 1988.

As of 2018, the material created for Princess Tina has been owned by Rebellion Publishing. In 2023 they issued The Best of Jane Bond, a compilation featuring some of the character's appearances in Princess Tina, on their Treasury of British Comics label.

== Titles ==
- Princess Tina (23 September 1967 to 13 December 1969)
- Princess Tina and Penelope (20 December 1969 to 30 May 1970)
- Princess Tina (6 June 1970 to 30 December 1972)
- Tina (6 January 1973 to 12 January 1974)

== Spin-offs ==
- Princess Tina Annual (13 editions, 1969 to 1981) (Note: British annuals were typically issued in the autumn of the year preceding that on the cover.)
- Princess Tina Ballet Book (9 editions, 1969 to 1977)
- Princess Tina Pony Book (13 editions, 1969 to 1981)
- Princess Tina Summer Extra (4 editions, 1969 to 1972)
- Tina Summer Special (1 edition, 1973)

== Collected editions ==
Title	ISBN	Publisher	Release date	Contents
The Best of Jane Bond	9781786188021	Rebellion Developments	12 April 2023	Material from Tina 25 February to 16 September 1967, Princess Tina 2 March 1968 to 6 April 1969 and 6 December 1969 to 28 February 1970.
