= The Sunburnt Country =

Non-fiction book about Australia

- Editor: Ian Bevan
- Authors: The Society of Australian Writers in Great Britain
- Language: English
- Genre: Non fiction; Anthology
- Published: 1953
- Publisher: Collins and Company
- Publication place: United Kingdom
- Media type: Print
- Pages: 256

The Sunburnt Country, subtitled Profile of Australia, is an anthology book about Australia published in 1953. It features chapters by 17 members of The Society of Australian Writers in England who were prominent Australian and New Zealand authors living in Great Britain. The book was published to coincide with the Royal visit to Australia on February 3 1954. The Society, who formed in London in 1952, wrote the book as a "tribute, combined with the thought that it would be helpful to her Majesty and the Duke of Edinburgh on their tour of Australia". The book was published in England and an advance copy bound in kangaroo hide was accepted by the Queen as preparation for the tour.

The authors decided The Sunburnt Country should be written without personal profit, so profits from the book went to charities nominated by the Duke of Edinburgh during his visit. The Duke chose charities Legacy (Australia) and The Playing Fields Association (England). At the conclusion of the Tour of Legacy House, Sydney, a cheque of £1,500 was presented by the Duke. The Queensland's share of the money was £154 and was divided between the 10 Legacy clubs in Queensland. By March 1954 the proceeds had amounted to £3,000.

A competition was held by the News Chronicle in association with The Sunburnt Country. The first prize was a tour of Australia and was won by English farmer Sam Farrant.

The Sunburnt Country was edited by Sydney writer Ian Bevan and published by Collins and Company. The jacket and end papers were designed by Loudon Sainthill.

== Contents ==
The book contains three main sections - A New Nation, The Landscape, and The People - with an introduction by Gilbert Murray.

=== A new nation ===
We think of it as a wide-open land; wide open for adventure, construction, development; wide open for living. We think of it as a wonderful place - not perfect, but wonderful; and this is an attempt to portray the imperfections and the wonder in a way which will inform those who have never thought about Australia at all, and perhaps challenge those who think about it to the exclusion of all else.

— The Sunburnt country : profile of Australia. London: Collins and Company. 1953. p. 15.

I. Australia's Expanding Horizon by Chester Wilmot.

Wilmont sets out reasons for the White Australia policy and the signing of the ANZUS Pact. It includes a study of the balance of power in the Pacific.

II. Origins and legends by Ian Grey.

A summary of Australian history beginning in the time of First Fleet. The chapter covers the history of convicts in Australia.

=== The landscape ===
The growth of cities has been the most obvious - and, to many, the most disturbing - aspect of Australia's development in the twentieth century. In particular, the cities of Sydney and Melbourne have swollen until between them they contain almost a third of the nation's people.

— The Sunburnt country : profile of Australia. London: Collins and Company. 1953. p. 55.

I. As most people see it by Colin Wills.

Provides descriptions of the Australian capitals. There was contemporary criticism regarding the fact that Wills, when depicting Sydney, did not mention the slums around Surry Hills and Redfern.

II. As few people see it by Jack McLaren.

Chapter about rural Australia, including Kimberley, Borroloola, Alice Springs, and Coober Pedy.

III. As man has made it by Paul Brickhill.

Describes the physical Australia, including soil erosion, breeding animals in a difficult landscape, and the Ninety Mile Desert.

IV. As nature left it by Mary Elwyn Patchett.

Patchett provides an imagine of rural and animal life in Australia, including kookaburras and tiger snakes.

=== The people ===
The men and women who inhabit the Australian continent have developed, though not perhaps perfected, a way of life which they feel has a quality of its own, a quality to be defended if necessary by force, and certainly by argument.

— The Sunburnt country : profile of Australia. London: Collins and Company. 1953. p. 147.

I. The Australian Serviceman by Russell Braddon.

Braddon depicts an Australian serviceman on the battlefield.

II. The Australian Woman by Judy Fallon.

The journalist and author Fallon gives a description of "The Australian mum". She remarks that "the average Australian woman is as Russell Braddon has so graciously remarked, 'a lousy cook.'"

III. Their way of life by George Johnston.

Johnston writes about the Australian male and the stereotypes of the "sunburnt drover", the "swaggering and undisciplined fighting man", and "the congenital drunk fighting" among others. He also remarks how four out of five Australians live in urban areas.

IV. Their sports by Jack Fingleton and Rex Rienits

An account of the country's sport and a feature on the history of cricket in Australia.

V. Their Art by Colin MacInnes.

The chapter covers Australian art, in particular paintings and painters of the country and the associated market.

VI. Their Books by Dal Stivens.

Stivens warns against non-Australian writers who write novels against an Australian background.

VII. Their Language by Eric Partridge.

Lexicographer Partridge writes about the Australian language.

VIII. Their achievements abroad by Alan Wood.

Wood writes about the Australian "clear-headedness" but that "Australians have a capacity for being more stupid than any other damn people on earth."

IX. Their link with Britain by Martin Boyd.

Boyd writes about the future direction of Australia and the links between the country and Britain.

== Reception ==
The 1953 pre-Christmas sales of The Sunburnt Country were so high in London that Collins and Company had to postpone a shipment originally intended for Australia. It was reported that around 20,000 copies were sold before Christmas 1953. During the pre-Christmas sales, The Times gave the book a favourable review on 12 December 1953 stating that it was "written throughout with that punch and vigor which seem characteristic of the country." There was also a large demand for the book at Australia House when it appeared in November 1953.

A review in The Scone Advocate praised it as a "vastly informative book" for both Australians and foreigners to learn about the country. It also praised use of photography within the book. A review in The Evening Advocate said the book was "a typically Australian mixture of hard facts, dry humour and rich sentiment." Constance Cummins, writing for the Brisbane Telegraph, described the book as "sparkling and stimulating". The Good Neighbour called it "one of the best anthologies of Australia" to learn about the country.

The Daily Telegraph criticised the "assembly line competence" of the book, stating "You look usually in vain, for the original thought, the arresting revaluation, the beguiling phrase." It criticised the pride of the book in Australians who had "done well" abroad, rather than focussing on those back home. A review in The Age was skeptical of the book's ability to take an in-depth look of the country, stating "there are good reasons for expecting little illumination from a book which divides among many writers the task of depicting a nation."

The Sunburnt Country regularly made it on the weekly Australian bookshop bestsellers list for nonfiction during 1954.
