= Tina (comics) =

British weekly girls' comic

- The cover of Tina, dated 18 March 1967, featuring a girl with a Troll doll.

Publication information
- Publisher: Fleetway Publications (1967)
- Schedule: Weekly (Mondays)
- Format: Ongoing series
- Publication date: 25 February – 16 September 1967
- No. of issues: 30

Creative team
- Artists: A.E. Allen; Bill Baker; Leo Davy; Mike Hubbard; Hugh McNeill; Jorge Moliterni; Juan Solé Puyal; Keith Watson
- Editor: John Sanders

Tina was a British weekly girls' comic anthology published by Fleetway Publications from 25 February to 16 September 1967. (Note: British comics of the time featured their off sale date on the cover) The title was created specifically to be syndicated by a consortium of European publishers, and was particularly successful in the Netherlands. However, it struggled to make a mark in the British domestic market, and after 40 issues was merged with Princess to create successor title Princess Tina.

== Creation ==
One of Fleetway's biggest boom areas by the 1960s was selling material from their many comics overseas. As creators were only paid their initial page rate, foreign sales were hugely profitable for the company, especially in Europe there were many publishers looking to fill out weekly anthologies. By 1967, a pattern was developing with purchases whereby adventure strips were selling better than many of the genre's staples, especially those more heavily steeped in British tropes - such as school stories - and foreign publishers were pressing for more action-orientated stories.

As a result, Fleetway devised Tina as a more action-themed comic with an eye on making material for export. Tina would be published simultaneously by Fleetway in the UK and a consortium of European publishers, including Dutch company Spaarnestad, based in Haarlem. Partners were also found in France (Publications Georges Ventillard), Germany (Buch- und Pressedienst), Italy, Austria, Luxembourg and Sweden. John Sanders, responsible for the successful Look and Learn and the less successful Ranger, was assigned as editor as Director of Juvenile Publications Leonard Matthews felt he was best equipped to deal with the unprecedented nature of the job. The comic itself proudly announced the worldwide nature in the editorial column 'written' by pigtailed young girl Tina. The wide range of licensees - in addition to Fleetway's traditional overseas markets of Australia, New Zealand and South Africa - allowed the comic to proclaim it was "The Most Popular Girls' Paper in the World".

To further aid the project, many stories were set in international locations. Perhaps the most famous was "Jane Bond - Secret Agent", officially no relation to Ian Fleming's James Bond and inspired by the television action girl boom initiated by the likes of The Avengers (which was hugely popular on continental Europe). The name also drew a connection with the famed newspaper strip Jane, on which artist Mike Hubbard had cut his teeth as assistant and then successor to Norman Pett. "Westward the Wagons" meanwhile featured cowgirl pioneer Glory Gold, and "Here Come the Space Girls" was a science fiction twist on the glamorous air hostess. While "The School in the Sun" did feature an educational setting it was an exotic one, and the star was introduced in a way her that allowed her nationality to be modified as desired by Fleetway's partners. The comic also featured some of the earliest toy tie-in comic strips, as veteran Hugh McNeill drew cartoon adventures of Troll dolls, which were a popular craze across Europe. Further cross-promotion came from another story depicted the adventures of Mattel doll Barbie - at the same time her British rival Sindy was appearing in Fleetway's June.

== Publishing history ==
Tina launched on 25 February 1967, priced at 7d, and with the first issue including a 'Gold Plated Troll Brooch'. While not as lavish as Princess, the comic still featured high production vales compared to the doughty June. Printed using web offset, 8 of the 32 pages were in full colour - including a painted cover - and a further four featured a pink overlay, with the remaining 20 in black-and-white. Also in the first issue was pop drama "Jackie and the Wild Boys" and desert island adventure "Two on Cockatoo", along with the less progressive clumsy Asian stereotypes of "My Chum Yum-Yum". Less racist humour was provided by McNeill cartoon "Willy the Wily Wolf" and girl-and-equine duo "Gi-Gi of the Circus and Her Horse Go-Go", while class was added by a Carlos Roume-drawn adaptation of Anna Sewell classic Black Beauty and "Tina's Ten-Minute Tales", a series of folk stories vividly illustrated by John Millar Watt.

Leo Davy's crime-solving "Dick and Dinah" would join from the second issue and ran until April, when it was replaced by "Moira, Slave Girl of Rome" - a historical story featuring an Ancient Briton as protagonist, designed so her origins could be modified to Gallic, Iberian or anything else. After "Black Beauty" concluded it was replaced by an adaptation of Louisa May Alcott's Little Women, while a second Watt-illustrated feature - "Tina's Scrapbook" - joined colour photographs of Barbie in various 'looks' on the back cover.

=== Cancellation and merger ===
However, domestic sales of Tina were poor as British girls failed to warm to the characters. Audience research revealed they found the characters too "macho" and "masculine". At the same time, Princess was encountering falling sales. Launched in 1960 as a high quality title aimed at middle-class girls, it had initially sold well before declining, with a switch from photogravure printing to web offset having further eroded its selling point. Rather than cancel both titles, Fleetway opted to combine them. Instead of a typical merge where one title continued with the other as a supporting 'and' feature on the cover for a period, they instead created Princess Tina, which combined the most popular features from both. The new title was again overseen by Sanders, and is considered a new, separate comic rather than a continuation of either Princess or Tina.

In comparison to many mergers, readers of both were heavily forewarned - to the extent that "The Happy Days" and "Alona - The Wild One" both guested in Tina to make the acquaintance of readers (with Jane Bond and the Trolls returning the favour). The final issue of Tina was dated 16 September 1967, with Princess Tina launching the following week. As well as Jane Bond and the Trolls, "Here Come the Spacegirls", "Westward the Wagons", "Moira, Slave Girl of Rome" and "My Chum Yum-Yum" all continued. Princess Tina would run for six years until merging with Pink. Unusually, the Tina brand would be revived in June 1973 for the Tina Summer Special, taking over from the Princess Tina Summer Special.

=== Dutch version ===
The Dutch version of Tina meanwhile had been a resounding success, despite fears the market would not support a girls' comic. After modest initial success with launch sales of 30,000, Tina soon reached 100,000 and the title became the country's best-selling comic. As such, the Spaarnestad version outlived the British edition, and would continue repackaging Princess Tina under the Tina name.

== Legacy ==
In 2018, the original material created for Tina was among that purchased by Rebellion Publishing. In 2023 they issued The Best of Jane Bond, a compilation featuring all of the character's appearances in Tina, on their Treasury of British Comics label.

== Stories ==
=== Alona - The Wild One ===
Published: 2 to 16 September 1967
Artist: Leslie Otway

Daughter of a governor in the West Indies, Alona Richards' daring and habit of taking on any challenge in front of her soon earns the girl the nickname "The Wild One". A gifted rider, sailor, swimmer and dancer, Alona never hesitates to help out the needy.

- A popular feature in Princess, the strip was featured in the last few issues of Tina to introduce readers to the character ahead of Princess Tina.

=== Barbie - The Model Girl ===
Published: 25 February to 16 September 1967
Artist: A.E. Allen

Fed up with life as an underappreciated office girl, Barbie Brown decides to take up a modelling career. Supported by her mischievous little sister Skipper, she lands representation from agent Ken Ballantyne. Barbie's kind behaviour, quick wits, fashion sense and good looks soon launch her on a globetrotting career, courted by many of the world's most famous designers.

- Licensed strip, based on the Mattel fashion doll of the same name. Continued in Princess Tina.

=== Black Beauty ===
Published: 25 February to 20 May 1967
Artist: Carlos Roume

- Adaptation of the Anna Sewell novel of the same name. Text comic, in full colour.

=== Dawn of the Islands ===
Published: 22 July to 16 September 1967
Artist: Franco Caprioli

Orphaned at a young age, Dawn Page grows up with her grandfather Captain Joshua Page, also known as Cap'n Josh. Together they do trading runs in the South Seas onboard Cap'n Josh's sailboat The Sprite, aided by Dawn's talking parrot Jimbo. As well as ferrying supplies, the trio also help out in conflicts between the island people and other merchants.

=== Dick and Dinah ===
Published: 4 March to 15 April 1967
Artist: Leo Davy

Dinah Mason and her brother Dick help run their father's fruit plantation in Florida until the siblings are drawn into a strange mystery.

=== Gi-Gi of the Circus and Her Horse Go-Go ===
Published: 25 February to 16 September 1967

Young rider Gi-Gi desperately wants to be in the circus; unfortunately her attempts to impress Mr. Ringmaster require the cooperation of excitable, distractible horse Go-Go.

- Humour cartoon.

=== The Happy Days ===
Published: 26 August to 16 September 1967
Writer: Jenny Butterworth
Artist: Andrew Wilson

Sue Day relates the madcap events that fill the life of the Day family - city-working Dad, apron-clad Mum, brother Sid, big sister and socially delicate Gloria, dog Rover and double whirlwinds of destruction The Twins, with occasional appearances from Sue's equally cheerful best friend Edie Potter and her brother Tommy.

- A popular feature in Princess, the strip was featured in the last few issues of Tina to introduce readers to the character ahead of Princess Tina.

=== Here Come the Space Girls ===
Published: 25 February to 16 September 1967
Artist: Keith Watson

In 2501 space travel is commonplace, with passenger voyages on space liners a popular method of transport. On board the huge X-77, which runs from Sardinia to Venus, are a trio of new air hostesses - Sally Trotter, Kathy Darling and Frances 'Fran' Finch. The girls soon end up on the wrong side of Captain Pepper - particularly the accident-prone Fran - but soon prove their worth, helping with a variety of difficult passengers and other crises.

- Continued in Princess Tina. Full colour.

=== Jackie and the Wild Boys ===
Published: 25 February to 16 September 1967
Artist: Leo Davy

Jackie Jackson becomes the new singer for amateur pop band The Wild Boys (consisting of Danny on guitar, Tim on guitar and Chimp on guitar) and the group get into many adventures as they gig around the country in search of a big break, under the variable management of impresario Bob Biggles.

- Continued in Princess Tina.

=== Jane Bond - Secret Agent ===
Published: 25 February to 16 September 1967
Artist: Mike Hubbard

Jane Bond isn't just the average American-born, Italian-educated globetrotting socialite, model and racing driver but in fact the top agent of international crimefighting organisation WorldPol, with her international jet-setting just a cover for the missions assigned to her by chief Colonel Merrill.

- Continued in Princess Tina.

=== Little Women and Good Wives ===
Published: 27 May to 16 September 1967
Artist: Gino D'Antonio

- Adapted from Little Women by Louisa May Alcott; the book was originally published in two volumes as Little Women and Good Wives in Britain, hence the name. Full colour.

=== Moira, Slave Girl of Rome ===
Published: 22 April to 16 September 1967
Artist: Alberto Salinas

When her chieftain father is defeated during the invasion of Britain, Moira is taken into the household of Julius Caesar, along with the gigantic, loyal Thorkil. As Caesar is frequently away on campaigns, Moira effectively works for a Roman lady called Livia, who is fair - if occasionally short-tempered and spoilt. Moira makes fast friends with others in Rome, including the kindly artisans Erik and Jon. She harbours hope of escape, but frequently finds herself pulled into plots by various Roman nobles against her Caesar and her friends that Moira cannot allow to come to pass.

- Continued in Princess Tina.

=== My Chum Yum-Yum ===
Published: 25 February to 16 September 1967
Writer: Ron Clark
Artists: Jean Sidobrel (25 February to 29 April 1967), Phil Gascoine (6 May to 8 July 1967), Pat Williams (15 July to 16 September 1967)

Brenda Burns is the daughter of an immigrant businessman in Hong Kong. Among the staff at their huge house is Yum-Yum, a pint-size clod who speaks broken English. Despite her endless impulsive, crass, insulting mannerisms Yum-Yum's unflinching loyalty soon sees her become the rich white girl's comedy sidekick.

- Continued in Princess Tina.

=== The School in the Sun ===
Published: 25 February to 16 September 1967
Artist: Juan Solé Puyal

The United Nations sets up a school for the children of its officials on the idyllic Caribbean island of Fortuna, with Marjorie Dawn as headmaster. British girl Kay Peach and her friends Pauline LeBrun (from France) and Nini Berlini (of Italy are among the students, and put their wits to foiling various schemes to take over the island or the school for their own ends.

- Continued in Princess Tina.

=== The Trolls ===
Published: 25 February to 16 September 1967
Artist: Hugh McNeill

An amiable family of four diminutive trolls attempt to live in peace in the countryside. However, greedy farmer Snurge and his idiot son spot them and become obsessed with capturing them, coming up with a variety of schemes to do so - which uniformly backfire.

- Based on the popular figures. Continued in Princess Tina.

=== Two on Cockatoo ===
Published: 25 February to 16 September 1967
Artist: Bill Baker

After their airliner ditches in the Pacific Ocean, bratty millionaire's daughter Carol Ford and level-headed air hostess Ann Marsh become stranded on the remote Cockatoo Island. Both hope for rescue, though Carol's spoilt behaviour and lack of patience are in marked contrast

- Continued in Princess Tina.

=== Westward the Wagons ===
Published: 25 February to 16 September 1967
Artist: Jorge Moliterni

On an under protected wagon train bound for California, the resourceful Glory Gold takes on the role of chief scout. She is aided by grizzled veteran Old Ned Nickless and Pawnee warrior Young Hawk as the convoy makes its way across the dangerous wilderness, fending off raiders and solving disputes among the travellers, usually led by the cantankerous Caleb Batt.

- Continued in Princess Tina.

=== Willy the Wily Wolf ===
Published: 25 February to 16 September 1967
Artist: Hugh McNeill

An anthropomorphic wolf constantly comes up with schemes to get copious amounts of free food - usually with disastrous results for himself and anyone else unfortunate enough to get caught up in things.

- Humour cartoon. Continued in Princess Tina.

== Spin-offs ==
- Tina Summer Special (1 edition, 1973)

== Collected editions ==
Title	ISBN	Publisher	Release date	Contents
The Best of Jane Bond	9781786188021	Rebellion Developments	12 April 2023	Material from Tina 25 February to 16 September 1967, Princess Tina 2 March 1968 to 6 April 1969 and 6 December 1969 to 28 February 1970.

== Reception ==
Susan Brewer described the comic as having "a good reputation for originality with some excellent storylines".
