= Pisciotta =

- Comune
- Comune di Pisciotta
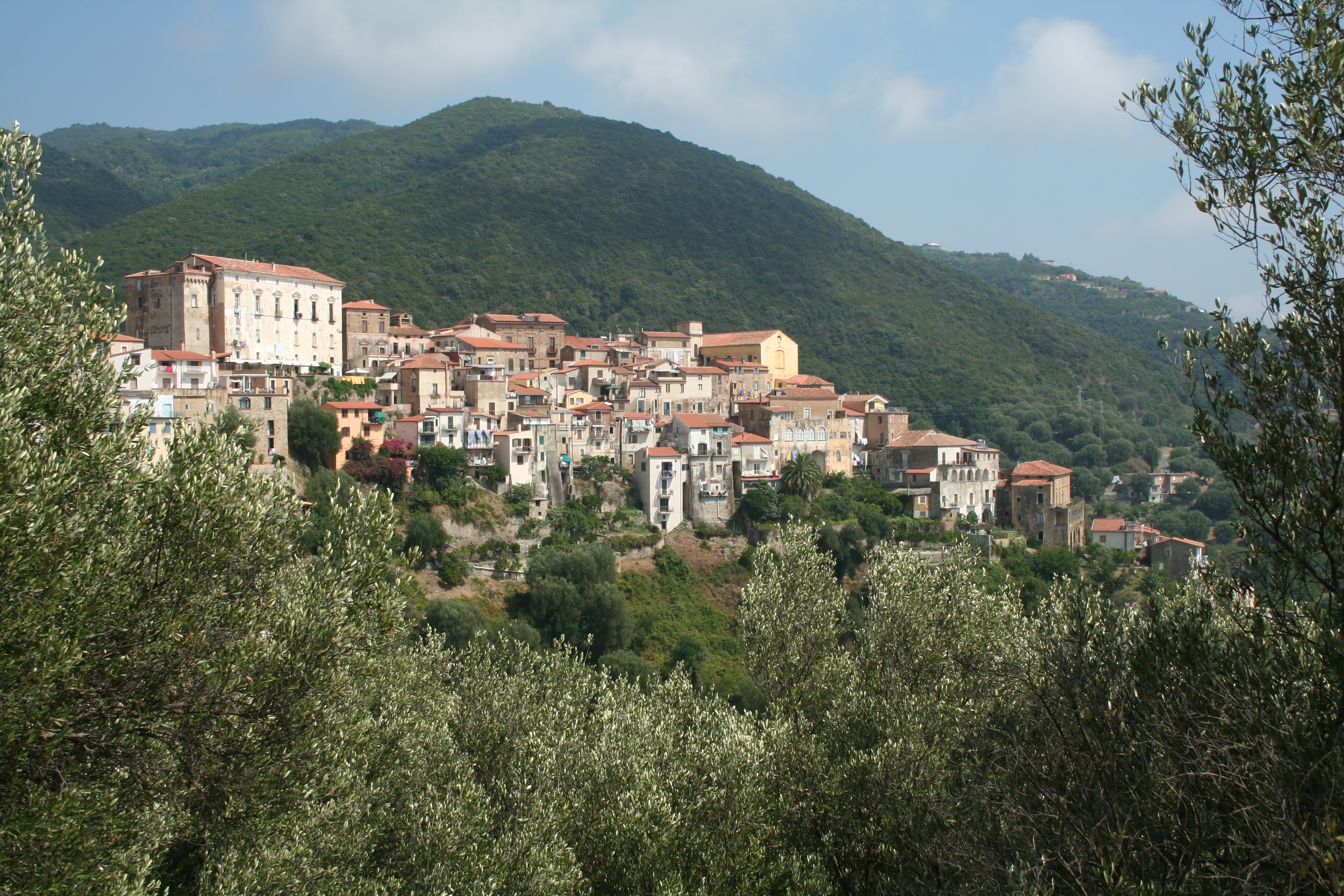

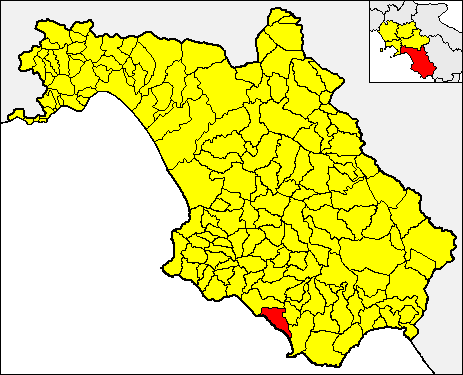
- Pisciotta within the Province of Salerno

- Location within Italy Location within Campania
- Coordinates: 40°6′29.12″N 15°14′1.79″E
- Country: Italy
- Region: Campania
- Province: Salerno (SA)
- Frazioni: Caprioli, Marina di Pisciotta, Rodio

Government
  - Mayor: Ettore Liguori

Area
  - Total: 31.24 km^{2} (12.06 sq mi)

Population (31 March 2018)
  - Total: 2,615
  - Density: 83.71/km^{2} (216.8/sq mi)
- Demonym: Pisciottani
- Time zone: UTC+1 (CET)
  - Summer (DST): UTC+2 (CEST)
- Postal code: 84066
- Dialing code: 0974
- Patron saint: St. Vitus
- Saint day: June 15
- Website: comune.pisciotta.sa.it

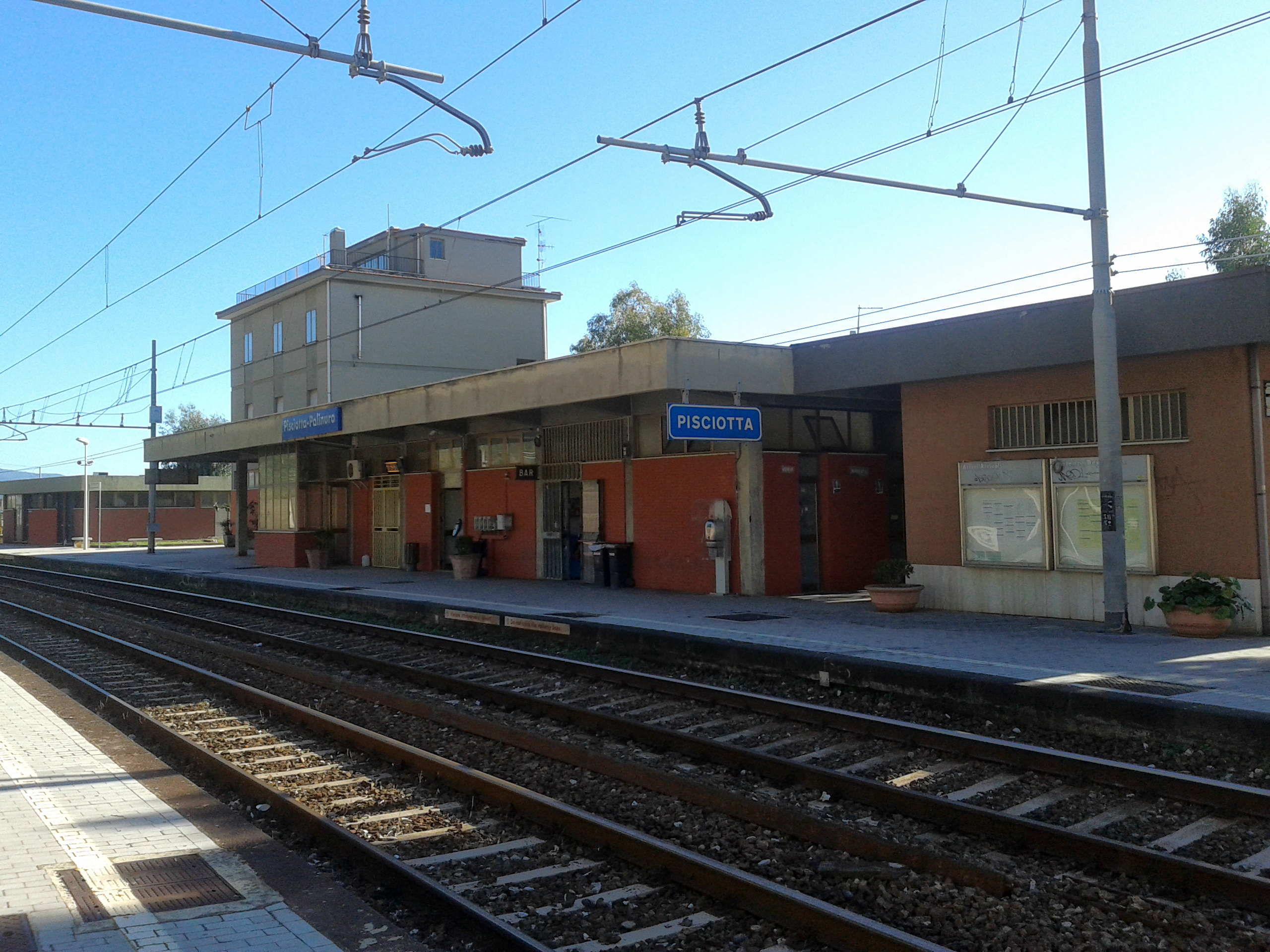
Pisciotta-Palinuro station

Pisciotta is an Italian town and commune in the province of Salerno, region of Campania.

== History ==
According to legend, Trojans escaping from the fire and the destruction of their city, Troy, founded Siris. Some of the inhabitants of the city later advanced westwards, following the vast valley of the Sinni river, up to the lake and to the Sirino mountain (from which they took the name), near present-day Lagonegro, where they founded the city of Siruci (now called Seluce). From here, they went to the Tyrrhenian Sea, on the beach of the Gulf of Policastro. Here they founded the colony of Pixous. This event is shown in a rare series of ancient coins, in archaic characters, with the names of Sirinos and Pixoes inscribed, referring respectively, to the populations of the two cities of Siris and Pixous, respectively. The name "Pixous" comes from the root "PYX", which derives from the Greek word for boxwood (present in the coat of arms of Pisciotta town hall).

In the year 194 BC, the Greek word pixous became corrupted to the Latin Buxentum.

In AD 915, when the town was plundered and burnt by the Saracens of Agropoli, the town's name had already changed to Policastro. Many of the fleeing Bussetani went beyond the promontory of Palinuro, where they founded a small village that they called Pixoctum, in memory of their lost town. Over the years the name had changed many times - Pixocta, then Pissocta, then Pichotta and finally Pisciotta.

The name of Pisciotta is found in the Catalogus Baronum (1144). The year 1464 marked for the country a very important development, when the survivors of Molpa, following the destruction of their village, were sheltered in Pisciotta. Until the abolition of feudality in 1806, Pisciotta was owned by the Caracciolos (1270), the Sanseverinos (15th century), the Pappacodas (from 1590).

Beginning in 1996 (or so), Pisciotta became host for a summer study-abroad program conducted through SUNY Purchase College.

== Geography ==
Located on a hill above the coastline of Cilento and its port and marina, Pisciotta lies on the national highway 447 between Ascea and Palinuro. The municipality borders with Ascea, Centola and San Mauro La Bruca; and counts the hamlets (frazioni) of Caprioli, Marina di Pisciotta and Rodio.

== Twin towns ==
- Hazleton, United States

== See also ==
- Cilentan dialect
- Cilentan Coast
- Cilento and Vallo di Diano National Park
