= Jane Bond =

British comic book story

- Jane Bond in an illustration from the 1969 Princess Giftbook for Girls.

Character information
- First appearance: Tina (25 February 1967)

In-story information
- Full name: Jane Bond
- Species: Human
- Place of origin: Earth
- Team affiliations: WorldPol

Publication information
- Publisher: Fleetway Publications; IPC Magazines
- Schedule: Weekly
- Title(s): Tina; 25 February to 16 September 1967; Princess Tina; 23 September 1967 to 28 February 1970; Princess Giftbook for Girls; 1969; Princess Tina Annual; 1969; Tammy Annual; 1979
- Formats: Original material for the series has been published as a strip in the comics anthology(s) Tina; Princess Tina.
- Genre: Spy
- Publication date: 25 February 1967 – 28 February 1970

Creative team
- Artist(s): Mike Hubbard

Reprints
- Collected editions
- The Best of Jane Bond: ISBN 9781786188021

Jane Bond is a British comic character who has appeared in the strip "Jane Bond - Secret Agent", published by Fleetway Publications and IPC Magazines. The character, a globetrotting secret agent, first appeared in the girls' anthology title Tina on 25 February 1967, drawn by Mike Hubbard. After Tina was cancelled "Jane Bond - Secret Agent" continued in the merged Princess Tina until 1970.

Despite the character's name, Jane Bond has no affiliation with either James Bond or Jane.

== Creation ==
When Fleetway Publications was created by the Mirror Group's acquisition of Amalgamated Press they acquired several girls' comics, and new management added Princess. Fleetway's main rival DC Thomson also had several successful titles, and launched the more adventurous Mandy in January 1967 to strong sales. Fleetway policy at the time was to respond to competitors' titles with a similar themed version of their own, and work was started on an answer to Mandy in the form of Tina. While still retaining some of the staples of the genre, Tina based a greater emphasis on action-adventure material, and among the line-up of the anthology was "Jane Bond - Secret Agent", designed to cash in on the popularity of the spy genre - as well as the successful James Bond films, Emma Peel of The Avengers had become a hugely popular figure.

Artist Michael Hubbard was assigned to the strip. He was well known at the time for his work on the Daily Mirror strip heroine Jane, having been assistant to the character's creator Norman Pett before taking over as artist himself in 1948. After "Jane" ended in 1959, Hubbard was one of a declining number of Fleetway artists who worked on both boys' and girls' comics as the company's departments became more entrenched. Having worked on the likes of Knockout, Comet and Sun (specialising in literary and film adaptations) as well as Schoolgirl's Library and June. Due to Fleetway's policy of not crediting contributors at the time and many of the company's records having not survived, as of 2023 the writer of "Jane Bond" has not been identified.

== Publishing history ==
Tina failed to find a market and was cancelled after six months, being merged with Princess on 23 September 1967. Unusually for a Fleetway merger, instead of a [title] and [title] name the merger saw Princess renamed Princess Tina, a title that would stick until the end of its run in August 1973. "Jane Bond - Secret Agent" would continue in Princess Tina until 28 February 1970. The character would occasionally reappear in annuals after the end of the weekly comic, last making an appearance with a reprint in the 1979 Tammy Annual.

The rights to the character were among the pre-1970 AP/Fleetway/IPC properties purchased by Rebellion Developments in 2018. The publisher began adding the new acquisitions to their Treasury of British Comics collection series soon afterwards. At one meeting to discuss stories chosen for the series, Rebellion Graphic Novel Editor Keith Richardson suggested Jane Bond. Junior editor Olivia Hicks pulled the material from the archives and quickly became a fan and fervent supporter of the collection, noting "there's something about the stories that's just so whacky, so delightfully camp, that really appealed to me". She also felt the stories were interesting from a social point of view, coming at a time when women in Britain were beginning to have independent careers before marriage. Rebellion put out an appeal for original artwork to help fill the gaps, with the collection being mastered by Joseph Morgan.

The Best of Jane Bond was released by Rebellion on 13 April 2023; the release was promoted with an 11-page preview in Judge Dredd Megazine #455. Due to some of the material, the collection featured a disclaimer stating the book "may deal with race, class, disability, or gender in ways uncomfortable to contemporary readers".

== Plot summary ==
Jane Bond is a glamorous international globetrotter of many skills, equally at home at a chic Monegasque dinner party or winning the Pasadena Grand Prix motor race without a hair out of place. Her wide range of skills are put to secret use as the top secret agent of Worldpol, a worldwide spy agency devoted to keeping world peace. Jane receives coded messages and instructions from Worldpol supremo Colonel Merrill, and uses her skill at fitting in to any situation, whether it's rescuing kidnapped scientists, exposing a school for enemy superspies or saving the polar ice caps. While she doesn't use firearms, Jane is heavily kitted out with Worldpol gadgetry, including a personal jet fighter, a camera-gun, a bracelet-concealed steel whip - and her own sharp wits and highly trained physique. The only thing she needs is a holiday, but instead there's always another mission.

== Collected edition ==
Title	ISBN	Publisher	Release date	Contents
The Best of Jane Bond	9781786188021	Rebellion Developments	12 April 2023	Material from Tina 25 February to 16 September 1967, Princess Tina 2 March 1968 to 6 April 1969 and 6 December 1969 to 28 February 1970.
