= Caprioli =

- Frazione
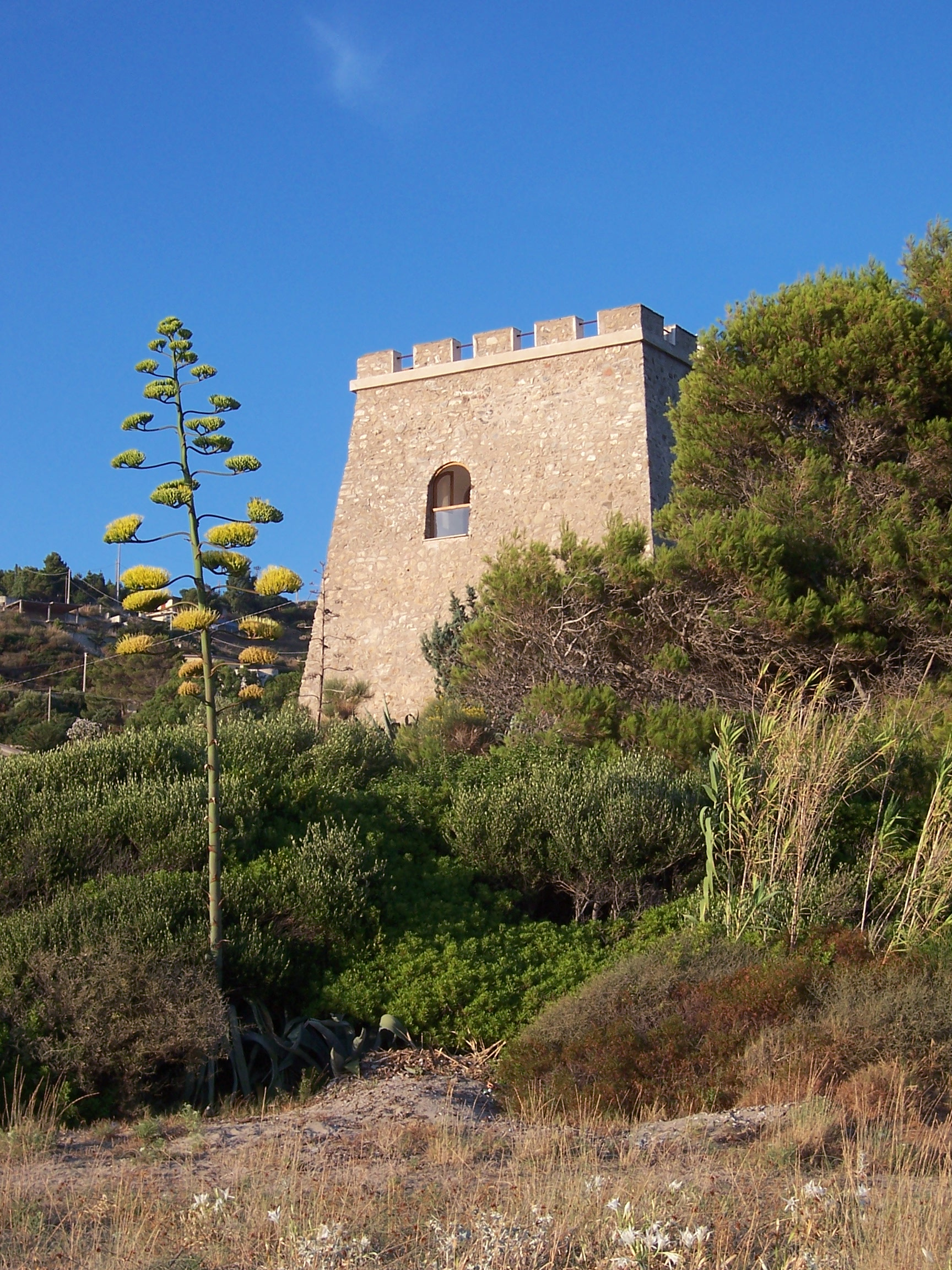
- The coastal tower of Caprioli

- Location of Caprioli in Italy
- Coordinates: 40°5′1.28″N 15°15′57.68″E
- Country: Italy
- Region: Campania
- Province: Salerno (SA)
- Comune: Pisciotta
- Elevation: 78 m (256 ft)

Population (2009)
  - Total: 121
- Demonym: Capriolani
- Time zone: UTC+1 (CET)
  - Summer (DST): UTC+2 (CEST)
- Postal code: 84066
- Dialing code: (+39) 0974

Caprioli is a Southern Italian village and hamlet (frazione) of Pisciotta, a municipality in the province of Salerno, Campania. As of 2009 its population was of 121.

== History ==
The toponym, literally meaning "roe deers" in Italian, has a different origin linked to Palinurus, the mythological helmsman of Aeneas's ship in Virgil's Aeneid.Landed in the beach near the current Palinuro, and to get rid of a curse, the oracles suggested Palinurus to build an altar where sacrifice a goat. The altar, named Torre del Capro (i.e.: "Goat's Tower"), was the original name of the village and was first mentioned in 1850, on a map of the Kingdom of the Two Sicilies.

In the village, originated from the ancient monastery of St. Catherine (1033), were built some notable buildings, as a palace and a castle, during the 18th century to the beginnings of the 19th. In 1830 It became a parish.

== Geography ==
Caprioli is located in southern Cilento, along the Cilentan Coast by the Tyrrhenian Sea. It lies on the national highway 447 between Pisciotta (north) and Palinuro (south), both 5 km far. It is also linked to San Mauro la Bruca (8 km) and Futani with a provincial road.

The village is composed by the wards (contrade) of Valle di Marco (seat of the train station), Fornace, Santa Caterina (on the road to San Mauro), Villa Verde and Pedali. At the southern borders of Caprioli, near Palinuro, is located a coastal tower named "Torre dei Caprioli", built in the 17th century.

== See also ==
- Cilentan dialect
- Cilento and Vallo di Diano National Park
