= Purita Campos =

Spanish cartoonist, illustrator and painter (1937–2019)

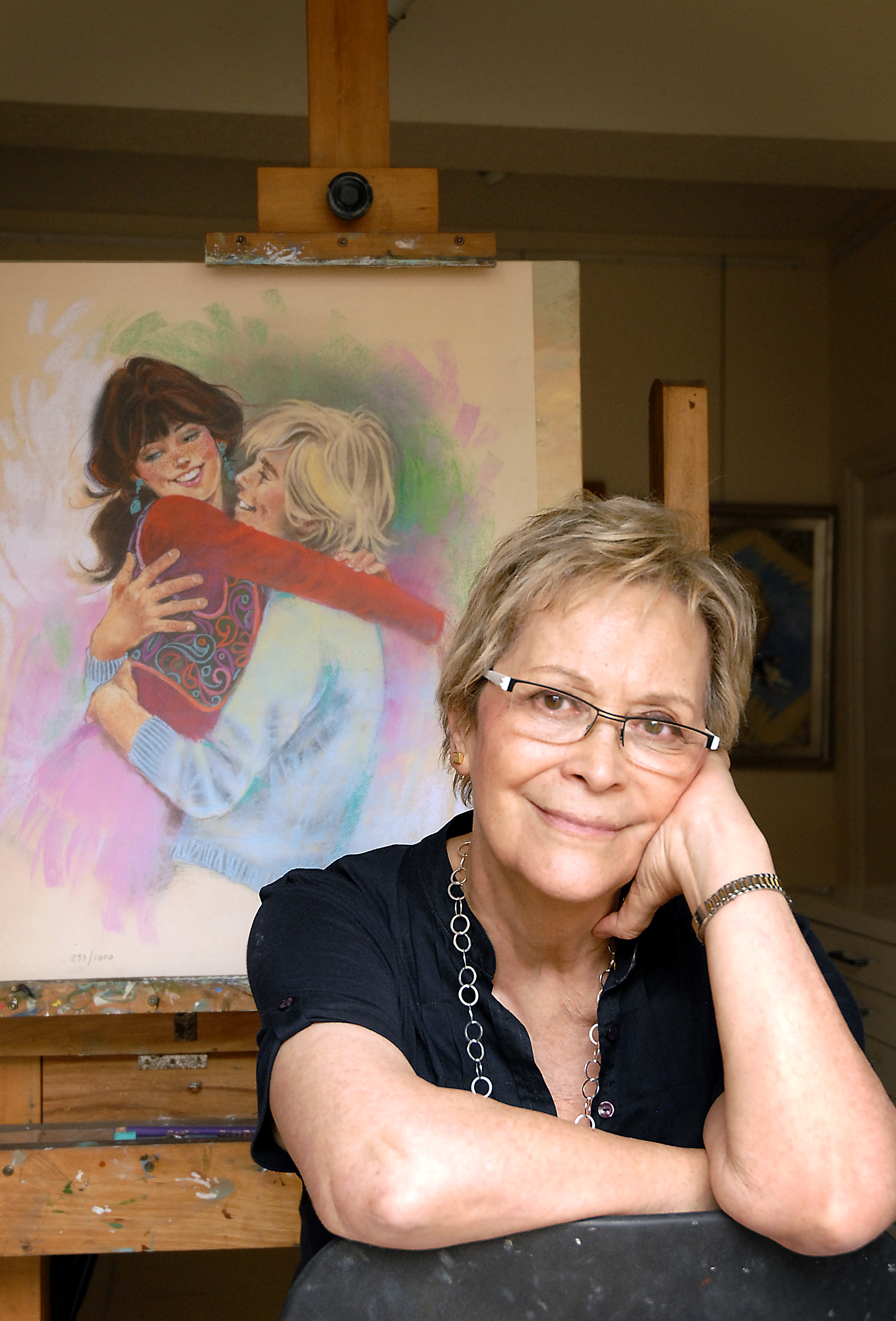
- Campos in 2010
- Born: Purificación Campos Sánchez; 18 August 1937; Barcelona, Spain
- Died: 19 November 2019 (aged 82); Madrid, Spain

Purificación Campos Sánchez (18 August 1937 – 19 November 2019), better known as Purita Campos, was a Spanish cartoonist, illustrator and painter.

== Life ==
Campos was born in Barcelona in 1937. She trained in fine arts at the Llotja de Barcelona, and she also trained as an actress, at the Theater Institute. She worked for the Bruguera publishing house with the character of Lily. Campos began working in 1971 for English magazines, specifically comic strips written by Philip Douglas. From the 1970s onwards, her long-running comics strips included Patty's World (Esther y su mundo in Spanish), which she and Douglas created for Princess Tina magazine. The strip was so popular that it ended up as a regular feature of the girls' magazine published by Oberon publishing house, which were published in Spain, the United Kingdom, the Netherlands, and Germany. She was among the bestselling and most successful Spanish comics artists.

As of 2006, motivated by the success of the character's reissues, she began the new adventures of Esther, with a script by Carlos Portela, whose first album sold 20,000 copies.

Campos was awarded the Haxtur Prize in 2004, the Medal of Merit of Fine Arts in 2009 and the Grand Prix of the Barcelona Comic Book Fair in 2013.

When not working on art for comics Campos and her husband ran a school and workshop to train aspiring artists. Campos died in Madrid in 2019.
