= Margaret West =

American heiress and vaudeville performer (1903–1963)

- Born: September 10, 1903; San Antonio, Texas, U.S.
- Died: July 29, 1963 (aged 59); San Antonio, Texas, U.S.
- Occupations: Vaudeville performer, radio hostess
- Known for: Vaudeville performances, being a socialite
- Parent(s): George Washington West (father), Robbie Bedell (mother)

Margaret West (September 10, 1903 – July 29, 1963) was a Texan heiress, vaudeville performer and later radio hostess.

== Biography ==
Margaret West was born in San Antonio, Texas, the daughter of George Washington West (1879–1956), the man who in 1913 built George West, Texas, and Robbie Bedell (1880–1959).

West became a vaudeville performer and sang Western songs dressed as a cowgirl. In 1948 she was a retired radio personality with homes on Santa Monica beach and in Bel-Air. Pola Negri moved in with her and they became notorious party hostesses, at the same time building up a collection of artworks.

At the death of West's father in 1956, West and Negri moved to San Antonio and, after a period spent in a hotel, moved to Olmos Drive, where they lived until West's death on July 29, 1963. Negri was the chief beneficiary to West's estate, receiving $1,250 a month ($13,145 in 2025 dollars) and the use of West's home and ownership of all furniture and art objects in the house. In her autobiography, talking about West, Negri said, "It was difficult for some of the so-called sophisticates to understand that there had not been... the slightest tinge of the sexual to what we shared together."
