= Jenifer Wayne =

British writer (1917–1982)

Jenifer Wayne (1917–1982) (born Anne Jenifer Wayne) was a British author of children's literature. She graduated in 1939 from Somerville College, Oxford. After leaving Oxford, she worked as an ambulance driver and an English teacher in a girls school in Newark-on-Trent before joining the staff of the BBC in 1941 as writer/producer.

As a member of the Features department she trained with Francis 'Jack' Dillon before replacing Douglas Cleverdon as the Features producer for the BBC West Region in Bristol. In Bristol she produced radio documentaries that highlighted the traditions and everyday folk in the surrounding regions. These included 'The Plain' (1942), 'The Cotswolds' (1943) and 'The Moor' (1943). After the death of her brother in 1944, she returned to London and began working on a series This is the Law which she was associated with until 1952. The writer and journalist Cecil R. Hewitt served as an advisor on the programme.

In 1948, she married Cecil R. Hewitt (C. H. Rolph of the New Statesman) and became a freelance writer for Home and Overseas Services. They had three children, the eldest of whom, Deborah, won a scholarship to Somerville. They lived in Surrey.

Her books included the Sprout series, and The Day the Ceiling Fell Down and The Night the Rain Came In, which featured the same group of three children. Her works have been translated into German, Dutch and Latvian.

Wayne also wrote two autobiographies, Brown Bread and Butter in the Basement: a Twenties childhood and The Purple Dress: growing up in the Thirties.
