= Henry Seabright =

British illustrator (1903–1976)

Henry Seabright (1903–1976) was a British magazine and children's book illustrator. Seabright was a contributor to a number of publications, including British monthly The Strand, Good Housekeeping, the Reader's Digest Condensed Books series, Bible Story, and the comics magazine Playhour. His adaptation of E. Nesbit's novel Five Children and It, in comic strip format, was published in Playhour.
