= Mary Elwyn Patchett =

Australian children's author, beautician, and dietitian (1897–1989)

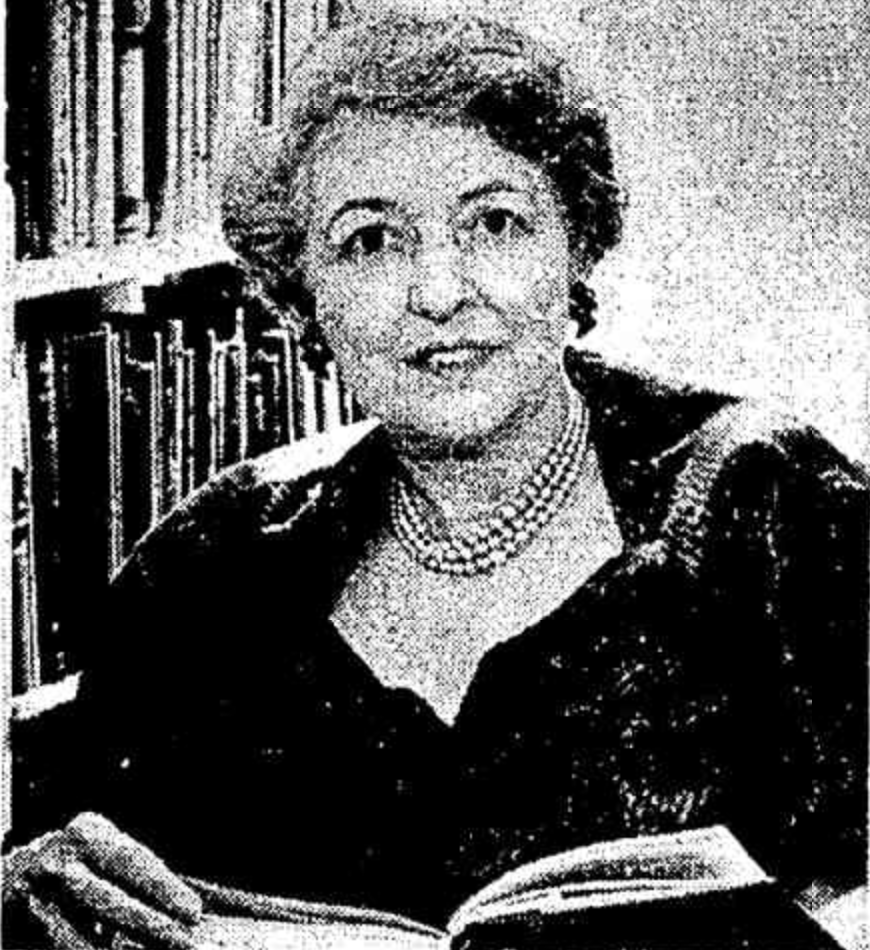
- Mary Elwyn Patchett in 1953
- Born: 2 December 1897; Sydney
- Died: 24 July 1989 (aged 91); England
- Occupations: Children's author; Beautician; Dietician
- Spouses: Alan Barrington Hill; Stanser Patchett
- Children: 2

Mary Elwyn Patchett (2 December 1897 – 24 July 1989) was an Australian writer of children's literature, beautician and dietitian. She was considered to be a pioneer of children's science fiction and the most widely-read Australian children's author of the time. Patchett spent most of her life in England where both her beauty salon and authorial careers began.

== Biography ==
=== Early life in Australia ===
Patchett was born on 2 December 1897 in Sydney. She grew up on a cattle station near Texas, Queensland. She married Alan Barrington Hill in 1921 and moved to Warren, New South Wales where she experienced more rural life. Patchett left the bush in 1925 and worked as a journalist for five years for the Sun newspaper group. Whilst in Australia, Patchett studied diet, anatomy and massage under Elizabeth McMillan-Davidson. She also worked in a Sir Truby King mothercraft centre.

"I think I was very lucky to grow up in Australia and get that solid training of self-reliance. In an accident, give me a bushman any day."

— Mary Elwyn Patchett, "Author inspired by love of cats". The Australian Women's Weekly. 4 July 1956.

=== Beauty salons in London ===
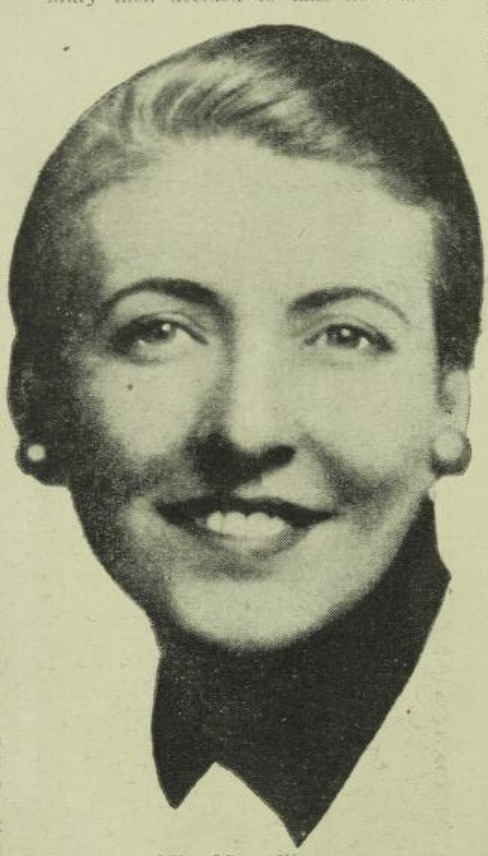
Mary Elwyn Patchett in 1936

"As soon as I arrived in London I felt that it would be my home. I'd planned to be away only six months, but London got into my blood, and I settled down to try to learn about it."

— Mary Elwyn Patchett, "Author inspired by love of cats". The Australian Women's Weekly. 4 July 1956.

Patchett left for London in 1931, originally only planning to stay there for six months. Patchett began her career in London by freelance writing until she could no longer do outdoor newspaper work due to an illness. Patchett was offered a job in a beauty parlour where she was shown a special technique based on muscular manipulation. By this point she was remarried to her husband Stanser Patchett from Melbourne. Once her husband became ill, Patchett travel to sanatoriums around Europe for treatment. On these travels Patchett learnt more about muscle manipulation treatments. She studied in Paris where she gained an orthodox diploma and enrolled on diploma course at the Helen Pessel school in Vienna 1935.

Back in London, Patchett opened a beauty parlour in Clarges Street, Mayfair then moved to Clifford Street in 1936. Among other high-profile patrons she became in charge of beauty treatments for Lady Titchbourne. Patchett designed a diet chart and provided a combination of muscular treatment with practical advice on diet and exercise. She also published articles on beauty tips.

Patchett fought for a common standard for beauty specialists, concerned about people providing temporary improvements which could do permanent harm. This led to her opening a school of beauty culture with four students at a time. She became known as one of the leading beauty specialists and dietitians in London.

=== World War II ===
During World War II Patchett worked as a wartime censor. She was stationed in Gibraltar where she was tasked with introducing Press censorship. Later, Patchett became the head of Press censorship in Bermuda where her husband died in 1939. Patchett stated she did not enjoy the job but it kept her alive "for many years." She worked in Bermuda until a foot injury forced her to retire from the job, then worked in censorship in Trinidad.

=== Career as author ===
During her time working in beauty salons in London, Patchett also wrote short stories on the side. After the War she travelled back to England via Canada.

Patchett started writing books because she needed money, and around 1949–1950 she decided to commit to children's writing full-time. Her first book, Ajax the Warrior (based on Patchett's dog, also called Ajax) was published in 1953 and was originally broadcast in 1952 for BBC Children's Hour. It inspired a long series of adventure stories from Patchett with animal characters and bush settings. In 1953, 500 copies of Ajax the Warrior were sold for use in Australian schools alone and a copy of the book was ordered for Buckingham Palace.

In 1954, copy of The Sunburnt Country, a profile of Australia written by Australian writers in England, was given to The Queen and The Duke of Edinburgh as a helpful guide for their tour of the country. Patchett wrote the chapter As Nature Left It, describing homestead life including depictions of platypuses and kookaburras.

"An animal that captures my imagination really becomes an illness for me. The only cure that works is to put all my feelings about it in a book. I must write it down."

— Mary Elwyn Patchett, "Author inspired by love of cats". The Australian Women's Weekly. 4 July 1956.

Many of Patchett's early books were science fiction and were written under the pseudonym M. E. Patchett. Patchett claimed she used this gender non-specific pseudonym "because boys don't like books written by women." She was keen to research the subject of her books, which led her to join British Interplanetary Society stating "I was determined not to write fool stuff in this field, so I decided to learn all I could about outer space and go on from there." At the time she was only one of three women to have been admitted to the Society.

Patchett was passionate about animals and worked this into her writing, stating that she "gets animals the way other people get jaundice". She wrote about her experience with mice and snake plagues whilst living in Warren, which inspired her novel Call of the Heart. Whilst working in Trinidad, she kept a centipede and rescued an anteater. She looked after it for a while before handing it over to a zoo. In England, she became an expert on falconry.

== Bibliography ==
Title	Genre	Publication date	Details
Ajax the Warrior	Adventure	1953	The novel is based on Patchett's childhood and involves depictions of Australian culture including dogs, Aboriginal Australians, wolves, and horses.
Kidnappers in Space	Science fiction	1953	A story of two brothers who are captured by the 'golden men' of Mars.
The Lee Twins: Beauty Students	Children's fiction	1953	The experiences of the 17-year-old Lee twins as beauty apprentices. The details of the story were reported as being authentic, owing to Patchett's understanding of the beauty industry.
Wild Brother	Adventure	1954	Set in Queensland featuring two dingoes and a kangaroo dog. Chosen as book of the month by John O'London's, and described as outstanding among Australia's "wealth of literary vitality". It was serialised on radio in 1955.
Tam the Untamed	Adventure	1954	A story about a foal and Australia girl set in a cattle station on the New South Wales and Queensland border.
Adam Troy, Astroman: The Exciting Story of How a Great Space-Pilot Saved the World from Radiation Beasts	Science fiction	1954	Science fiction novel for children.
Evening Star	Children's fiction	1954	Children's novel about dance.
Lost On Venus: the Thrilling Story of Two Boys Who Land on the Planet and Explore a Fantastic World	Science fiction	1954	Story about two young space trainees who crash-land on Venus and encounter dangerous alien life.
Journey Through Pear Country	Mystery	1954	Book inspired by Patchett's memories of forests and cacti.
Undersea Treasure Hunters	Children's fiction	1955	
Your Call, Miss Gaynor	Children's fiction	1955	Part of the Marcie Muir collection of Australian children's books.
Treasure of the Reef: An Ajax Book	Adventure	1956	Story of the adventures of a girl on an island in the Great Barrier Reef.
Cry of the Heart	Children's fiction	1956	Based on Patchett's experience of living in Warren, New South Wales and the story of Ma'amu the cat. It was serialised throughout 1956 in The Australian Women's Weekly.
Return to the Reef: An Ajax Book	Adventure	1956	The protagonist Mary spends a holiday on the Barrier reef.
Send for Johnny Danger: The Amazing Adventures of the Ace Pilot, Captain Danger, and His Crew on the Moon	Science fiction	1956	Story involving astronauts and a space flight to the Moon.
Caribbean Adventurers	Adventure	1957	Part of the Marcie Muir collection of Australian children's books.
Outback Adventure: An Ajax Book	Adventure	1957	Part of the Ajax series and Marcie Muir collection of Australian children's books.
Sally's Zoo	Adventure	1957	
The Saffron Woman	Adventure, romance	1958	Adventure set in 1860s Australia.
The Brumby	Adventure	1958	The first book in Patchett's Brumby pony series.
The Mysterious Pool	Adventure	1958	Book about Anabel and John Forrest set in the Australian bush.
The Call of the Bush	Adventure	1959	Part of the Ajax series. Story about Mary and her dog on holiday by the sea.
The Proud Eagles	Adventure	1960	Dedicated to an eagle called Horatia.
The Quest of Ati Manu	Young adult	1960	Story of two boys on the north shore of Australia searching for treasure and being hunted by two murderers.
Warrimoo	Young Adult	1961	Story about a young Englishman given a year to prove himself. He spends time in Arnhem Land earning the name Warrimoo, and Brazil using the skills he learned.
The End of the Outlaws	Adventure	1961	Part of the Ajax series.
Come Home Brumby	Adventure	1961	
Brit	Adventure, romance	1961	Story about a family who travel from Adelaide to Northern Territory. It is set in the period of the construction of the Overland Telegraph and includes depictions of Aboriginal and Torres Strait Islanders.
The Golden Wolf	Adventure	1962	Part of the Ajax series.
Dangerous Assignment	Science fiction	1962	Part of the Kerry White collection of Australian children's books.
In a Wilderness	Adventure	1962	
Circus Brumby	Adventure	1962	Story involving horses and circus animals. Part of the Brumby series.
Ajax and the Haunted Mountain	Adventure	1963	Part of the Ajax series.
The Venus Project	Science fiction	1963	A British secret agent is ordered to find a Russian rocket landed in Arnhem Land and faces creatures from outer space.
A Budgie Called Fred	Adventure	1964	
Tiger in the Dark	Adventure	1964	An expedition to a remote part of Australia looks for a surviving marsupial 'tiger'.
Ajax and the Drovers	Adventure	1964	Part of the Ajax series.
Stranger in the Herd: a Brumby Book	Adventure	1964	Part of the Brumby series.
Summer on Wild Horse Island	Adventure	1965	An adventure story featuring treasure and horses.
The Last Warrior	Adventure	1965	Story involving Aboriginal Australians and conflict in the Northern Territory.
The White Dingo	Adventure	1965	
Terror of Manooka	Adventure	1966	Story about an elderly Aboriginal man who goes on an expedition to rainforests north of Queensland.
Summer on Boomerang Beach	Adventure	1967	Book about the Delaney family's holidays on a small island of the Great Barrier Reef where they befriend an Aboriginal boy.
Festival of Jewels	Adventure	1968	Story of two children and a jewel thief set in Northern Australia.
Farm Beneath the Sea	Science fiction	1969	Story involving mariculture.
Quarter Horse Boy	Adventure	1970	
The Long Ride	Adventure	1970	Part of the Brumby series.
Rebel Brumby	Adventure	1972	Set in the mountain country of Australia, Joey considers breeding his own wild brumbies. Part of the Brumby series.
Roar of the Lion	Adventure	1973	
Hunting Cat	Adventure	1976	

=== Collections ===
- BBC Children's Hour Annual
- Look and Learn
- Chucklers Annual
- A Bumper Book of Girls' Stories

=== Awards ===
Wild Brother was named book of the month by John O'London's. It was also Highly Commended CBCA Book of the Year in 1955.
