= Sylvia Thorpe =

British writer (1926–2023)

June Sylvia Thimblethorpe
- Born: 2 April 1926; London, England
- Died: 15 January 2023 (aged 96)
- Occupations: Secretary, teacher, novelist
- Writing career
- Pen name: Sylvia Thorpe
- Period: 1953–1983
- Genre: romance

June Sylvia Thimblethorpe (2 April 1926 – 15 January 2023), better known by the pen name of Sylvia Thorpe, was a British writer of romance novels from 1950 to 1983.

Thorpe was the third elected Chairman (1965–1967) of the Romantic Novelists' Association, and was named an Honor Life Member.

== Biography ==
June Sylvia Thimblethorpe was born on 2 April 1926 in London. Educated there at a school in Brondesbury, Kilburn High School for Girls, Slade School of Fine Arts, and University College. She worked as secretary from 1949 to 1952 and later she worked as school teacher.

As Sylvia Thorpe, she wrote over 25 historical romance novels from 1950 to 1983. Her novel "The Scapegrace" (1971) won the Elizabeth Goudge Historical Award. She was the third elected Chairman (1965–1967) of the Romantic Novelists' Association, and was named an Honor Life Member of the organization.

Thorpe was a trustee for the Goodrich Village Hall Trust. Goodrich is a village, in south Herefordshire which is very close to Gloucestershire and the Forest of Dean situated near the River Wye and is famous for its old red sandstone Norman and medieval castle.

Thorpe died on 15 January 2023, at the age of 96.

== Bibliography ==
=== As Sylvia Thorpe ===
==== Single novels ====
- The Scandalous Lady Robin (1950)
- The Sword and the Shadow (1951)
- Beggar On Horseback (1953)
- Smugglers' Moon (1955) aka Strangers on the Moor
- The Golden Panther (1956)
- Sword of Vengeance (1957)
- Rogues Covenant (1957)
- Captain Gallant (1958)
- Beloved Rebel (1959)
- The Devil's Bondman (1961)
- The Highwayman (1962)
- The House at Bell Orchard (1962)
- The Reluctant Adventuress (1963)
- Dark Heritage (1968) aka Tarrington Chase
- No More A-roving (1970)
- The Scarlet Domino (1970)
- The Scapegrace (1971)
- Dark Enchantress (1973)
- Silver Nightingale (1974)
- Romantic Lady (1974)
- Flash of Scarlet (1976)
- The Varleigh Medallion (1979)
- The Avenhurst Inheritance (1981) aka Three Loves
- Mistress of Asington (1983)

==== Conyngton Series ====
1. Fair Shine the Day (1964)
2. Spring Will Come Again (1965)
3. The Changing Tide (1967)
4. The Witches of Conyngton (1976)

==== Anthologies in collaboration ====
- Home to the Highlands / House at Bell Orchard / Secret Longings (1979) (with Jessica Eliot, Nancy MacDougall Kennedy)
