= Edmond Ripoll =

Spanish comics artist

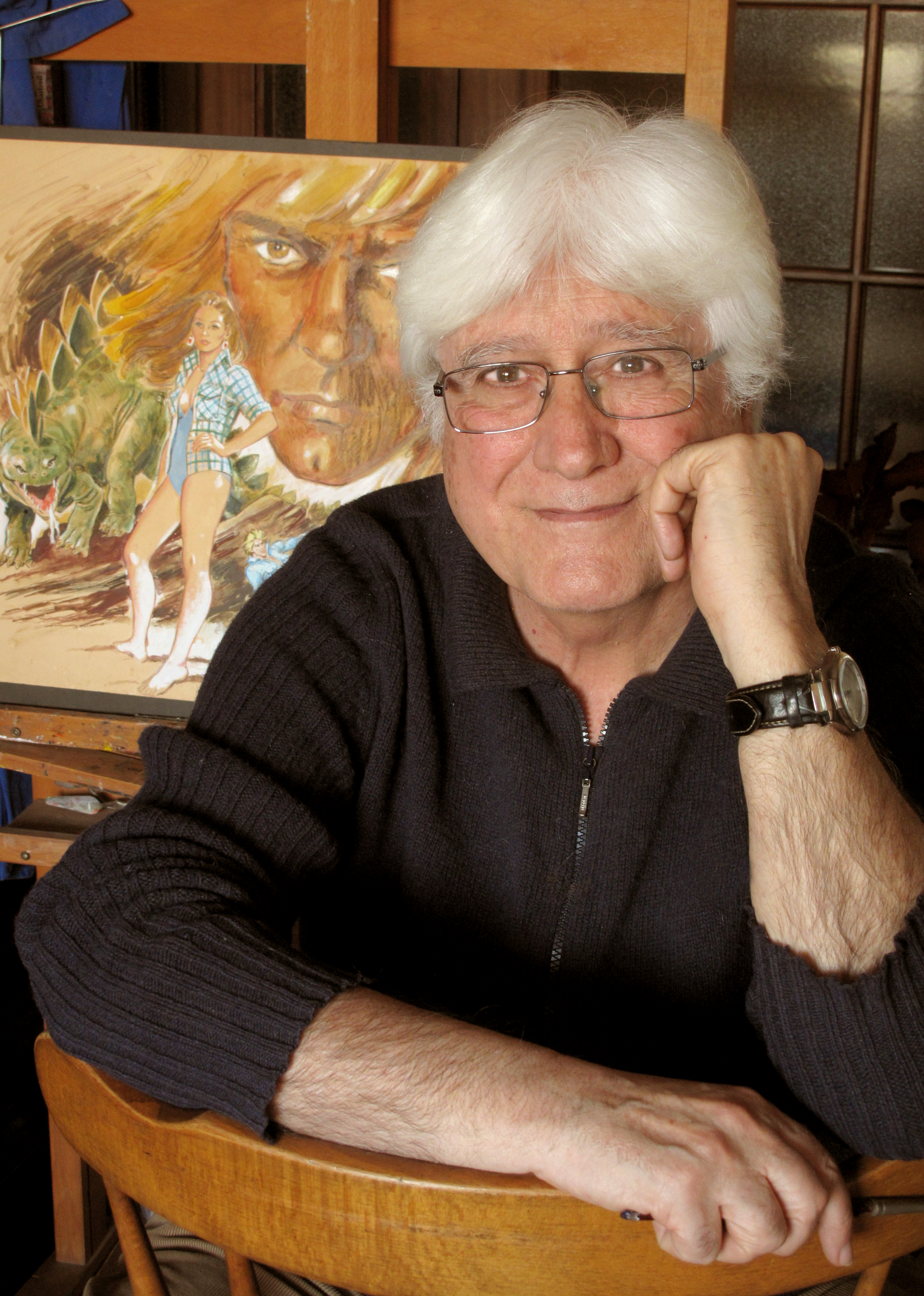
Edmond Fernández Ripoll in 2010

Edmundo Fernández Ripoll, better known as Edmond (born 1938), is a Catalan comic book artist and illustrator, born in 1938 march in Barcelona. His most famous creation was Jan Europa.

== Career ==
The young Edmond works in a hardware store, selling T-shirt's by mail and as an assistant in an advertising agency till 1959 when is hired by Editorial Bruguera to adapt television characters as Rintintín, Bonanza, Daniel Boone or Bronco. In the seventies also publishes romance stories in girls magazines like Celia, As de Corazones, Sissi, Sissi-gráfico o Sissi-juvenil and adaptations of books like Tom Sawyer and La capitana del Yucatán for Joyas Literarias Juveniles collection.

Lately he works internationally for the British market (Adarés Anglians, How The West Was Won, The Handcuff Hotspurs, The Quest, Tyler the Tamer), French bande dessiné (Brigade Temporelle, Mike Nelson), holandés (Elsje de Windt, Mimi, Meta de Bokesprong, Oberon), Swedish market and even in Zaire. In Spain, creates with the script of Víctor Mora Supernova (Súper Mortadelo, 1973) and with Andreu Martín Fantasía S. A. (Tío Vivo, 1975) and Los Titanes (Super Sacarino and Super Ases).

In 1976 creates Eva Star for Can Can and in April 1979, Jan Europa, his more popular series, to Mortadelo.

Similar to Jan Europa is Doctor Impossible in 1984. His last creation was Fede y sus colegas, dramón urbano por entregas, scripted by Jaume Ribera for the TBO magazine of Ediciones B.

== Style ==
Armando Matías Guiu wrote about this author

Edmond is a methodical, rhythmic, extremely correct cartoonist. Very cerebral. His style, photographic. When he draws a building, a situation, it is exactly as it exists in reality or as if there would be.

== Work ==
Year	Title	Writer	Publication
1967	Bonanza	Vicente Palomares	Tele Color (Editorial Bruguera)
1969	The Handcuff Hotspurs		Smash! (IPC Magazines)
1971	Tyler the Tamer		Smash! (IPC)
1972	Brigade Temporelle (Time Brigade)	Claude J. Legrand	Futura
1973	Supernova	Víctor Mora	Súper Mortadelo (Editorial Bruguera)
197-	Los Titanes	Andreu Martín	Super Sacarino (Editorial Bruguera)
1978	Fantasía S.A.	Andreu Martín	Tío Vivo (Editorial Bruguera)
1979	Jan Europa		Mortadelo y Super Mortadelo (Editorial Bruguera)
1983	Mimí		Jana (Sarpe)
1983	Barracuda		Jana (Sarpe)
1984	Doctor Impossible		Mortadelo
1986	Erika		Chicas (Editorial Bruguera)
1986	Marga	Armando Matías Guiu	Chicas (Editorial Bruguera)
1988	Cinemateca TBO	Víctor Mora y Jaume Ribera	TBO (Ediciones B)
1988	["Fede and his Colleagues," an urban drama in installments]	Jaume Ribera	TBO de Ediciones B.
198-	Supertrailers		Super Mortadelo (Ediciones B)
198-	Sindy	Edmond Ripoll	TBO (Editorial Bruguera)
198-	La Tribu	Edmond Ripoll	TBO (Ediciones B)
1989	La vida crítica y la crítica de la vida	Jaume Ribera, Edmond Ripoll	TBO (Ediciones B)

== Sources ==
- Cuadrado, Jesús (2000). Atlas español de la cultura popular: De la historieta y su uso 1873-2000, Madrid: Fundación Germán Sánchez Ruipérez. 2 v. ISBN 84-89384-23-1.
- Guiral, Antoni (November 2007). Los tebeos de nuestra infancia: La Escuela Bruguera (1964-1986). Colección Magnum nº 7. Barcelona: Ediciones El Jueves, S.A. ISBN 978-84-9741-589-7.
