= Franco Caprioli =

Italian comics artist

- Born: 5 April 1912; Mompeo, Italy
- Died: 8 February 1974 (aged 61); Rome, Italy
- Occupation: Cartoonist

Franco Caprioli (5 April 1912 – 8 February 1974) was an Italian comics artist, comics writer, illustrator and painter.

== Life and career ==
Born in Mompeo, Caprioli began his career as a fresco painter, before making his professional debut as an illustrator in 1937, in the comics magazine Argentovivo. In 1939 he started collaborating with Il Vittorioso, for which he created the popular series Gino e Piero and Piero il mozzo del sommergibile. He later collaborated with other important publications, notably Topolino, in which he created the critically acclaimed series La tigre del Bengala, L'Audace and Corriere dei Piccoli. In the early 1970s he realized comic adaptations of classic adventure novels for Il Giornalino. He also collaborated with international publishers, including Fleetway Publications and Éditions Aventures et Voyages. He died of heart attack on 8 February 1974, aged 61.
