= John Millar Watt =

British painter

John Millar Watt (14 October 1895 – 13 December 1975) was a British painter, illustrator and comics artist who created the comic strip Pop.

== Early life ==
Born in Greenock on the River Clyde, Scotland, the son of James H. Watt, an engineer, and his wife Henrietta. He was raised in Ilford in East London and studied metalwork at the Sir John Cass Institute before studying anatomy under Henry Stabler. He was apprenticed to an advertising agency whilst attending evening classes at the Westminster School of Art.

His apprenticeship was interrupted in 1915 by World War I during which Watt served with the Artists' Rifles and the Essex Regiment.

After being discharged, he studied briefly at Slade School of Art before returning to advertising work. He supplemented his wages with cartoons for the Daily Chronicle and illustrations for The Sphere.

== Pop ==
In 1921 he created a comic strip for the Daily Sketch entitled Reggie Breaks It Gently but the lead character was soon to become known as Pop, a rotund businessman usually to be found in a bowler hat, waistcoat, striped trousers and spats. The strip did not concentrate on city business but on Pop's family; Pop was a henpecked husband with two daughters, a son and a young baby. The strip was notable as it incorporated speech inside the panels in the American style (the dialogue running continuously across panels rather than in balloons) and the use of a continuing landscape across the (usually four) panels whilst the action was divided into frames in the foreground.

The strip was one of the few British strips to be successfully syndicated in America and was praised widely by artists as diverse as Chic Young and Sir Alfred Munnings.

Watt continued to draw Pop until 1949, leaving to concentrate on lucrative advertising and illustration work.

== Other comics work ==
In the mid-1950s, he began contributing comic strips to the Amalgamated Press's Thriller Comics Library, also producing many covers for the same title between 1956 and 1959. He also contributed to the Robin Hood Annual and the girls' comic Princess. His full page illustrations in Look and Learn were a highlight of that magazine for many years.

Watt also produced a number of strips for rivals D. C. Thomson.

== Death ==
Watt died at the age of 80.
