= 1958 in comics =

Notable events of 1958 in comics.

== Publications and events ==
=== January ===
- January 1: in Le journal de Tintin, Le grand defi (The big challenge) by Jean Graton; Michel Vaillant makes his debut.
- January 8: in Tintin, the first chapter of SOS meteors, Mortimer in Paris, by Edgar Pierre Jacobs
- January 20: The first episode of Francisco Ibáñez Talavera's Mortadelo y Filemón (Mort and Phil) is published.

=== February ===
- February 6: in Spirou, the first chapter of La foire aux gangsters, by Franquin, is published.
- February 17: Johnny Hart's B.C. makes its debut.

=== March ===
- March 2: The final episode of Stanley Link's Tiny Tim is published.
- March 13: The first episode of Marcel Remacle's Le Vieux Nick et Barbe-Noire is published in Spirou.
- March 15: The first episode of Ken Reid's Jonah is published in The Beano.
- The first issue of the American satirical magazine Cracked is published. Mascot Sylvester P. Smythe appears on the front cover of its first issue. The magazine will run until February 2007.
- Uncle Scrooge #21 — "The Money Well," by Carl Barks (Dell Comics)
- In the 253rd issue of Detective Comics the recurring villains Terrible Trio make their debut.
- The Mickey Mouse adventure Kali's Nail by Romano Scarpa is first published in the Italian Disney comics magazine Topolino.

=== March-April ===
- First issue of Superman’s girlfriend, Lois Lane.

=== April ===
- April 2: René Goscinny and Albert Uderzo's Oumpah-pah makes its debut in Tintin.
- April 15: first issue of the magazine Frontiera (Bonelli), with the series Verduco Ranch, by Hèctor Oesterheld and Gian Luigi Bonelli.
- April 27: Stan Lynde's Rick O'Shay makes its debut. It runs until 8 March 1981.
- In the 247th issue of Adventure Comics the Legion of Super-Heroes make their debut.

=== May ===
- May 1 : In Spirou, the first chapter of Ruèe sur l’Oklahoma, by Goscinny and Morris, is published.
- May 13: In Charles M. Schulz' Peanuts Snoopy is first seen imitating a vulture. This will become a running gag in the series.
- May 15: In the magazine Spirou, the first episode of the Spirou et Fantasio story Le Prisonnier du Bouddha, by Franquin and Greg is published.
- May 26: The first episode of Jack Cole's Betsy and Me is published. After Cole's suicide on 13 August the series will be continued by Dwight Parks until 27 December.
- The final issue of Justice Traps the Guilty is published.
- The final issue of This Magazine is Haunted is published.

=== June ===
- June 15: The final episode of Cliff Sterrett's Polly and Her Pals appears in the papers.
- Action Comics #241 — "The Super-Key to Fort Superman", first appearance of Superman's Fortress of Solitude (DC Comics)
- Uncle Scrooge #22 — "The Golden River," by Carl Barks (Dell Comics)
- Dottor Paperus by Luciano Bottaro – Donald Duck in a parody of Goethe’s Doctor Faust.
- In Audace, debut of the series Il piccolo ranger (Bonelli).

=== July ===
- July 7: The first episode of Francisco Ibáñez Talavera's La familia Trapisonda is published.
- In issue #242 of Action Comics one of Superman's arch enemies Brainiac makes his debut.
- 'Walt Disney's Comics and Stories' # 214 - "Fearsome Flowers" by Carl Barks.
- The Red Sea Sharks by Hergè
- In Vaillant, debut of Pifou, son of Pif le chien, by Roger Maas.

=== August ===
- August 22: Belgian comics artist Pom suffers a nervous breakdown, which lets his latest Piet Pienter en Bert Bibber story to be interrupted in the papers. Gaston Ebinger therefore makes a filler comic titled Intermezzo voor Detectives, which will run until 6 September, after which Pom continues his Piet Pienter en Bert Bibber story again.
- August 27: Comics artist Bob Wood is arrested for manslaughter of his girlfriend.
- Four Color Comics #946 — The Big Country, by Paul S. Newman and Bob Correa (Dell Comics)
- In the 123rd issue of Superman Supergirl makes her debut.
- La tiare d’Oribal by Jacques Martin (Le Lombard).

=== September ===
- September 8: Jack Berill, Neal Rubin and Rod Whigham's Gil Thorp makes its debut.
- September 17: in Tintin, the first chapter of Tintin in Tibet, by Hergè, is published.
- September 26: The first episode of Jan-Dirk van Exter's Brommy & Tommy is published. This comics series will run in newspapers until 1978.
- September: Wallace Wood and Jack Kirby's Sky Masters makes their debut.
- Superman #124 — the first DC title with a letters column as a regular feature beginning with this issue.
- Uncle Scrooge #27 — "The Money Champ," by Carl Barks (Dell Comics)
- Bob White's Cosmo the Merry Martian makes its debut and will run until October 1959.
- The first issue of the British comics magazine War Picture Library is published. It will run until December 1984.
- In Frontiera, Sergio Bonelli debuts as writer with the series Un ragazzo nel Far West (drawings by Franco Bignotti and Giovanni Tucci).

=== October ===
- October 12: The final episode of Honey and Hank, aka Elsworth by Bernard Segal, aka Seeg, is published.
- October 20: Víctor Mora's El Jabato makes its debut.
- October 23: In the Johan and Peewit story The Flute with Six Holes by Peyo The Smurfs make their debut, as well as their leader Papa Smurf. They eventually become a successful spin-off comic.
- The final issue of Harvey Kurtzman's satirical magazine Humbug is published.
- The Cisco Kid, with issue #41 (October–December cover date), cancelled by Dell.
- In the 101st issue of Wonder Woman the Time Trapper makes his debut.
- First issue of Tex Gigante (still present today in Italian newsstands). The magazine inaugurated the so-called Bonelli format (medium-sized albums, about a hundred pages long), which gradually supplanted the traditional strip format of the publishing house.
- The Donald Duck comics story Paperin Meschino (text by Guido Martina, drawings by Pier Lorenzo De Vita) is published, a parody of Andrea Da Barberino’s Il Guerin Meschino.

=== November ===
- November 6: in Il giorno dei ragazzi Gionni Galassia by Benito Jacovitti, a boy passionate about astronomy, protagonist of clouse encounters and trips in the space, makes his debut.
- November 8: Dutch comics artist Pieter J. Kuhn suffers a heart attack. As a result Kapitein Rob is interrupted for half a year. It will restart again in Het Parool on 30 June 1959.
- November 17: The first episode of Frank O'Neal's Short Ribs is published.
- November 27: in Spirou, the first chapter of L'evasion des Dalton, by Goscinny and Morris, is published.
- In the British comics magazine The Beezer Tom Bannister's Colonel Blink makes his debut.
- Adam Strange makes his debut in the 17th issue of Showcase.

=== December ===
- December 2: Comics artist Bob Wood is convicted to three years in prison for manslaughter of his girlfriend.
- December 12: In Charles M. Schulz' Peanuts Snoopy is first seen sleeping on top of his doghouse.
- December 12: La mesa degli scheletri (The skeletons’ mesa) by Gianluigi Bonelli and Galep; Mefisto, the Tex Willer's nemesis, makes his comeback. The villain, in his first appearance a simple illusionist, here becomes definitively an evil wizard with unsettling paranormal powers.
- In the 73rd issue of Forbidden Worlds Richard E. Hughes and Ogden Whitney's Herbie Popnecker makes his debut.
- The first issue of Strange Worlds is published and will run until August 1959.
- The first issue of the British comics magazine Bunty is published, which will run until 2001.
- In Vaillant, debut of Grabadu and Gabaliouchtou, by Jean Tabary, “the two stupidest heroes of comics”.

=== Specific date unknown ===
- Hui Guan-man's Uncle Choi is first published.
- Philip Mendoza's Gulliver Guinea-Pig debuts and will run until 1965.
- Hugh Morren's The Smasher makes its debut.
- Irving Phillips's The Strange World of Mr. Mum makes its debut. It will run until 1974.
- Jürgen Kieser creates Fix und Fax, which will run until 1987.
- Foundation of publishers Major Publications and I. W. Publications.
- Tibet's Le Club de Peur-de-Rien makes its debut.
- In Le parisien liberè, Spirou et les Hommes-bulles, by Andrè Franquin and Jean Roba, is prepublished.

== Births ==
=== December ===
- December 2: André Osi, Belgian comic artist (Horizon Blanc, Napoléon), (d. 2021).

=== Specific date unknown ===
- Esegé, Spanish comics artist (Gustavo, el de la Calle del Diecinueve, Tito Sidecar, El Dinosaurio Jeremías), (d. 2021).

== Deaths ==
=== January ===
- January 2: Harry G. Peter, American comics artist (Wonder Woman), dies at age 76 or 77.
- January 11: Frank Willard, American comics artist (Moon Mullins), dies at age 64.
- January 23: Ilia Beshkov, Bulgarian comics artist and painter, dies at age 56.

=== February ===
- February 17:
  - Robert Moore Brinkerhoff (born 1880), American comics artist (Little Mary Mixup), dies at age 77.
  - Hugh McCrea, Australian poet, illustrator and comics artist (Jim and Jam), dies at age 81.
  - Bob Satterfield, aka Sat, American comics artist (Sat's Bear, Oh, Thunder, The Family Next Door, Days We'll Never Forget), dies at age 82.
- February 20: Jim Wilcox, American illustrator and comic artist (continued Dick Cole), dies at age 62.

=== March ===
- March 2: John Held Jr., AKA Myrtle Held, American illustrator and comic artist (Merely Margy, Rah Rah Rosalie), dies at age 69.
- March 6: Andreas Haavoll, Norwegian schoolteacher, banker, publisher and comics writer (Smørbukk), dies at age 88.
- March 26: Fernand Dineur, Belgian comics artist (Tif et Tondu), dies at age 53.
- March 31: Harry O'Neill, American comic artist (Broncho Bill, Bumps), dies at age 66.

=== April ===
- April 24: Vasilis Zisis, Greek painter and comics artist (worked on Classics Illustrated), commits suicide at age 44.
- April 26: Joan Collette, Dutch graphic artist, designer, illustrator, painter and comics artist, dies at age 59.

=== May ===
- May 1: Till Goodan, American comics artist (made comics based on Gene Autry), dies at age 62 from a heart attack while riding his horse.
- May 12: Frank Minnitt, British comics artist (Billy Bunter), dies at age 63.
- May 28: Charlie Schmidt, American comics artist (Radio Patrol), dies at age 71.

=== June ===
- June 7: Joe Maneely, American comics artist (Atlas Comics), dies in a railroad accident at age 32.

=== August ===
- August 8: J.P. McEvoy, American comics writer, (Dixie Dugan), dies at age 61.
- August 13: Jack Cole, American comics artist (Plastic Man) commits suicide at age 43.

=== September ===
- September 18: Olaf Gulbransson, Norwegian-German cartoonist and comics artist (worked for Simplicissimus), dies at age 86.
- September 20: Aleksander Dobrinov, Bulgarian caricaturist, cartoonist and comics artist, dies at age 60.

=== October ===
- October 4: Jack King, American animator and comics artist (assisted on Mickey Mouse), dies at age 72.
- October 26: Clare Victor Dwiggins, also known as Dwig, American comics artist (School Days, Tom Sawyer and Huck Finn), dies at age 74.
- October 28: Mario Pompei, Italian comics artist and animator (Bice e Bauci, Saputino, Il Prode Anselmo, Armando il Pittore, Pinco Pallino, Isolina Marzabotto), dies at age 55.

=== December ===
- December 8: Andres C. Audiffred, Mexican comics artist (El Señor Pestaña, Chom Prieto, Don Lupito), dies at age 63.

=== Specific date unknown ===
- Alex Akerbladh, Swedish-British comics artist (drew various celebrity comics based on popular music hall and film comedians), dies at age 71 or 72.
- Basil Blackaller, British comics artist (Hairy Dan), dies at age 36 or 37.
- S.J. Cash, British comics artist and illustrator, dies at age 73 or 74.
- Charles Genge, British comics artist (Our Boy Scout Patrol), dies at age 83 or 84.

== First issues by title ==
- Bunty (D. C. Thomson & Co.)
- Il piccolo Ranger (Edizioni Audace, June)
- Cosmo the Merry Martian (Archie Comics, September)
- Life with Archie (Archie Comics, September)
- Tex Gigante (Edizioni Audace, October)
- Strange Worlds (Atlas Comics, December)
- Superman's Girl Friend, Lois Lane (DC Comics, March/April)
- Tell It to the Marines Super #1 (I.W. Publishing) — (also see Tell It to the Marines)
- Uncle Choi (Hong Kong)

== Initial appearance by character name ==
=== DC Comics ===
- Adam Strange in Showcase #17 (November), created by Julius Schwartz and Murphy Anderson - DC Comics
  - Sardath in Showcase #17 (November), created by Julius Schwartz and Murphy Anderson - DC Comics
- Tlano in Batman #113 (August), created by France Herron and Dick Sprang - DC Comics
- Bizarro in Superboy #68 (October), created by Otto Binder and George Papp - DC Comics
- Brainiac in Action Comics #242 (July), created by Otto Binder and Al Plastino - DC Comics
- Calendar Man in Detective Comics #259 (September), created by Bill Finger and Sheldon Moldoff - DC Comics
- Doctor Alchemy in Showcase #13 (April), created by John Broome and Carmine Infantino - DC Comics
- Doctor Double X in Detective Comics #261 (November)
- False-Face in Batman #113 (February), created by Bill Finger and Sheldon Moldoff - DC Comics
- Legion of Super-Heroes in Adventure Comics #247 (April), created by Otto Binder and Al Plastino - DC Comics
  - Cosmic Boy
  - Lightining Lad
  - Saturn Girl
- Mister Element in Showcase #13 (April)
- Orana in Wonder Woman #250 (December), created by Jack C. Harris - DC Comics
- Rainbow Archer in Adventure Comics #246 (March), created by France Herron and George Papp - DC Comics
- Space Ranger in Showcase #15 (July), created by Edmond Hamilton, Gardner Fox and Bob Brown - DC Comics
- Terrible Trio in Detective Comics #253 (March), created by Dave Wood and Sheldon Moldoff - DC Comics

=== Other publishers ===
- Cosmo the Merry Martian in Cosmo the Merry Martian #1 (Archie Comics, September)
- Mort & Phil in Pulgarcito #1394, January
- Herbie Popnecker in Forbidden Worlds #73 (American Comics Group, December)
- Papa Smurf in Johan and Peewit: "La Flûte à six trous" (Éditions Dupuis, October 23)
- The Smurfs in Johan and Peewit: "La Flûte à six trous" (Éditions Dupuis, October 23)
- Sherlock Time by Héctor Oesterheld and Alberto Breccia, in 'Hora Cero Extra' (December 5) – investigator of supernatural and time traveller.
