= Cosmo the Merry Martian =

Comic book

- Cover of Cosmo the Merry Martian 1 (Sep 1958), art by Bob White

Publication information
- Publisher: Archie Comics
- Schedule: bimonthly
- Publication date: Original; September 1958 – October 1959; Reboot; January 2018 – April 2020
- No. of issues: Original; 6 Reboot; 10
- Main character(s): Cosmo the Merry Martian; Orbi; Professor Thimk; Astra

Cosmo the Merry Martian is a comic book series published by Archie Comics between 1958 and 1959. The comic was created by Bob White as a way to provide a family-appropriate comic for children with an interest in the then-current space race. The title character was the first Martian to visit the Earth. The title only lasted for six issues. Every issue, including the last one, had a cliffhanger ending.

Besides the title character, other characters are Orbi (Cosmo's astronaut companion), Professor Thimk (the scientist who invented the Martian spaceship, but was not on it when it took off from Mars), and Astra (Cosmo's girlfriend). In the first issue, while they are traveling toward their intended destination of Earth, a meteor damages their spaceship, and they crash land on Earth's moon. The moon turns out to be inhabited by beings named Oogs, who live underground.

A reboot of the series, titled Cosmo the Mighty Martian, began publication in January 2018. The new series is written by Ian Flynn with art by Tracy Yardley and Matt Herms, all of whom previously collaborated on Archie's Sonic the Hedgehog comic series.
