= Frank O'Neal =

American cartoonist

Frank O'Neal in 1958

Frank O'Neal (May 9, 1921 – October 10, 1986) was an American cartoonist best known for his comic strip Short Ribs, which he wrote and drew from 1958 to 1973.

== Early life and career ==
Born in Springfield, Missouri, O'Neal was kept on the move by his traveling father, and the youth grew up in Arkansas, California, Indiana, Louisiana, Michigan, Tennessee and Washington, D.C. He studied for three years at the Jefferson Machamer School of Art in Santa Monica, California and sold his first cartoon professionally in 1950, to the Saturday Evening Post. After six years of freelance cartooning, he spent a year and a half drawing storyboards. His feature "How to Bring Up Parents" ran in Redbook for three years.

== Later career ==
The syndicate Newspaper Enterprise Association (NEA) released his comic strip Short Ribs as a daily on November 17, 1958, and additionally as a Sunday comic on June 14, 1959. The gag-a-day comic had no regular characters, but frequently featured such recurring settings as a medieval king's court and the American Old West. In 1973, O'Neal turned over the strip to his assistant, Frank Hill, while O'Neal focused on advertising-industry work, including an 18-month stint as advertising manager for the Carmel Pine Cone, a weekly newspaper in Carmel, California, beginning in 1974. The final Short Ribs strip ran Sunday, May 2, 1982.

== Awards ==
He won the 1964 National Cartoonists Society's Division Award for Newspaper Strips: Humor for Short Ribs.

== Personal life ==
O'Neal and his wife Bettie had two children, John and Mollie. He was living in or near Pacific Grove, California, at the time of his death at age 64.
