= Bunty =

British comic

- The cover of Bunty #6 (22 February 1958), featuring the title character.

Publication information
- Publisher: DC Thomson
- Schedule: Weekly
- Format: Newsprint magazine
- Genre: Drama, Romance, School, Humour
- Publication date: 18 January 1958 – 17 February 2001
- No. of issues: 2,249
- Main character(s): Bunty; The Four Marys; Moira Kent; Lorna Drake

Creative team
- Artist(s): Barrie Mitchell, Sean Phillips, Ron Smith

Bunty was a British comic for girls published by D. C. Thomson & Co. from 1958 to 2001. It consisted of a collection of many small strips, the stories typically being three to five pages long. In contrast to earlier and contemporary comics, it was aimed primarily at working-class readers under the age of 14, and contained mostly fictional stories. Well-known regular strips from Bunty include The Four Marys, Bunty — A Girl Like You, Moira Kent, Lorna Drake, The Comp, Penny's Place and Luv, Lisa.

== Publication history ==
Bunty debuted with the 18 January 1958 issue. Over the course of its history, Bunty absorbed three other DC Thomson girls' comics: Suzy (1987), Nikki for Girls (May 1989), and Mandy & Judy [M & J] (1997).

With the issue of 28 March 1992 (issue #1785), Bunty's covers switched from illustrated comics-style imagery to a photograph of a teen model, becoming more evocative of a fashion magazine than a comic book. Bunty went monthly in 2000 before ceasing publication after a further 5 months; altogether the magazine published 2,249 issues.

As well as the weekly comic, Christmas and summer annuals were published. After the weekly comic ended its publication in 2001, the Christmas annuals continued to be published until 2008. Due to a lack of new comic strips to be included, the annuals post-2001 focused more on typical girls' magazine features, like horoscope quizzes and celebrity facts. The annuals ceased their regular publication with the 2009 issue, although several one-off books featuring reprints of the classic Bunty comics have since been released.

== Layout and features ==
The average issue of Bunty contained several short comic-strip stories, broken up by letters pages, competitions, featured readers, puzzle pages, promotions, next-week previews or advertisements. The back page initially featured a cut-out doll and paper clothes, which eventually gave way to a wall poster.

== Regular stories ==
=== The Four Marys ===
The Four Marys was the longest story the comic ran. It appeared from its creation in 1958 to its end in 2001. When the strip started, public boarding schools like St. Elmo's, the girls' boarding school, were common, but as time went on, they became less accessible to Bunty's general audience. It centred on four young teenagers who lived in a girls-only boarding school in Elmbury, and often had problems with studying, being bored, or helping (and being hindered by) the other girls or teachers within the school. Of the four main characters, two were middle class, one was the aristocratic daughter of an Earl, and one was a working-class girl, attending the school on a scholarship. This representation of the working class was a reflection of changing class experiences in the 1950s.

=== Bunty — A Girl Like You ===
A one-page feature included a short comic strip about the comic's namesake, a blonde girl called Bunty, and her friends Haya and Payal. The strip was so short it usually could not convey more than a quick joke — mostly about normal teenage girl subjects like boys, family, or school.

=== Moira Kent and Lorna Drake ===
The Dancing Life of Moira Kent, the story of an aspiring ballerina, appeared in the first issue of Bunty, and Moira Kent was a regular feature for many years, the character eventually achieving international stardom. When the Moira Kent storyline was discontinued, it was replaced with Lorna Drake, also about a ballet dancer who attended the Thelma Mayne Dancing School (Thelma having been a ballerina herself before an accident prevented her from dancing ever again). This accident was caused by Lorna's father, also a ballet dancer, who was going blind when he let Thelma Mayne fall during a performance, thus crippling her. However, Moira still appeared in the annuals, where she had opened her own ballet school.

=== The Comp ===
A comic drawn very much in the same way as The Four Marys, this was set in a mixed-sex comprehensive school. The Comp was originally published in Nikki, and moved to Bunty in 1989 after that comic folded. The Comp finished a short time before Bunty's end, the story being that Redvale Comprehensive closed down and the pupils were sent to different schools.

=== Penny's Place ===
A comic drawn in much the same way as The Comp and The Four Marys, Penny's Place began in the comic M&J (an amalgamation of earlier comics, Mandy and Judy), but was taken up by Bunty in 1997 when M&J ended. The story centered on Penny, whose parents owned a cafe called Penny's Place, and her three best friends, who all lived in the same town and attended the same school. Penny's best friend Donna was from a lower-class family and had several brothers and sisters, and these siblings were often involved in storylines.

The story came to an end in the late 1990s, but due to popular demand Bunty began to publish the story again from the beginning. During this time, both Bunty and Mandy published Penny's Place in their Christmas annuals.

=== Luv, Lisa ===
This story was written out as a diary, with pictures to accompany it. The pictures took the form of photographs, being the only regular comic to do so (although regularly "one-time" comics also took the form of being shown in photographs). Regularly her stories would consist of her writing about people, boyfriends, and situations she was in with her friends — although sometimes she would have a story set about her, with an adventure such as finding good Christmas cards. Her friends' names changed from issue to issue, the only regular characters being her brother and her mother.

=== Other strips ===
- A Bed Called Fred: A girl is pushing a four-poster bed named Fred all the way from John O'Groats to Land's End.
- A Brother for Barbara - When friends of twelve-year-old Barbara Carter's father are killed, their ten-year-old son, Steve, comes to live with the Carters. Barbara has always wanted a brother — but now she is not too sure.
- A Cure For Scaredy-Cat Pat! – Pat Watkins is terrified of all animals and her father has an idea to cure her. He sends her to stay with her Great Aunt Sophie who runs an animal sanctuary.
- A Date for Donna – Donna Hill is unaware that her best friend, Denise Ripley, is jealous of her and is out to wreck any date that she makes.
- A Doll Called Dinkydou – The story of a doll with a defect searching for a home, told from the doll's point of view.
- A New Life for Lilly – In Victorian times, Polly Bond leaves her sister Lilly on a doorstep to be taken in by a wealthy family. Returning to the household as a servant some years later, Polly is horrified to see her sweet sister is now selfish and spoilt.
- A Pet For Peggy – Peggy North would love to have a dog of her own and her friend enters her into a competition where she wins a puppy, but the new housing manager is strict on the no pets policy.
- A Pony Called Punch – The adventures of Punch, a sturdy little Welsh mountain pony owned by the kindly Mike Watson.
- A Racehorse of Her Own: Shirley Wilson raises Hope, a young racehorse abandoned at birth by her wealthy father. She has to pay for all the expenses as her father believes in working hard for money, so she takes a job with a rag-and-bone man. When Dad demands Hope back later on, she refuses. He agrees to let her keep Hope on condition she still pay for expenses, which are even more costly now.
- A School for Sophie - Sophie Masters is school mistress at Oxley village in 1840. The school is maintained by a special trust, but there have to be at least three pupils on the roll or it will be closed. Elsa Bradley, the squire's daughter, pretends to be Sophie's friend but is plotting against her.
- A School Of Her Own – Rona Starr has been expelled from many schools, so to make sure she gets an education her father buys Pinehurst School, where Rona will be the only pupil.
- A Tale From the Toy Museum – Tamsin Treco goes to stay with her grandmother who runs a toy museum in a Cornish fishing village. In each strip, Tamsin hears the stories behind many of the toys on show.
- A Twin for Toni – Orphan Toni Downs is happily settled with her foster family when it is discovered she has a twin sister, Tammy. The Morrows foster Tammy as well and Toni is delighted at first, but then things start to go wrong as she finds herself forever blamed for Tammy's mishaps.
- Abracadabra Academy: Jamara Jones comes from a line of witches. She wants to be an ordinary girl – not least of which because her spells keep going wrong, with hilarious results. But Jamara's mother wants Jamara to follow the family tradition and sends her to Abracadabra Academy, a school for witchcraft.
- Abracadabra! – Stacy Green's father is a very good stage magician, but when his wife is injured in a trick which went wrong, he stops performing. Stacy and her mother want him to return to the stage and to try to encourage him, Stacy puts together an act herself.
- Acting Up! – Joanne Cowley and Fay Dawson try out the youth theatre. But is it to do with acting or boys?
- Alison Of Appletree Farm – Alison Jones is manager of Appletree farm until the young owner Jenny Carr is old enough to take over. Jenny's aunt Myra farms nearby and is determined to get control of Appletree Farm.
- All about Anna: Julie thinks her new neighbour Anna is a nice, quiet, shy girl until she and her best friend Megan catch a glimpse of her diary. They decide she needs to be kept an eye on.
- All Change!: Toni Day thinks she does not get enough attention, especially from her sisters and brother. She is determined to change this and get people to notice her more. But so far her attention-seeking tactics are not working out.
- Amazing Grace, Gymnast of the Future – Circus girl Grace Connor has her heart set on being a gymnast, but her father keeps pushing her into being a trapeze artist, believing that a gymnastics career will not make her money. Can she change his mind?
- Amber All-Alone: Amber Taylor is all alone after her best friend moves away. Then her classmates mistakenly think her family has won the pools when they move to a bigger house, which is in fact due to Dad's promotion. Amber finds herself the centre of attention and is taking advantage of it.
- Annie's Orphans – In the wake of the Great Fire of London, Annie Besson rescues seven orphans. They go to live on a barge where Annie is trying to teach them to read and write. They are joined by a mudlark, Jonno, who steals whatever he needs. Annie is trying to cure him of stealing, but Jonno eventually ends up in court.
- An Athlete She Must Be! – Ellen Perkins tries to turn her guzzling sister into an athlete.
- And Granny Came Too...: Morag McDonald lives on an island in the Hebrides with her grandmother. She wants to be a gymnast and has had to teach herself from a library book as there are no gymnastics facilities available. When Morag returns a valuable wallet to its owner, he rewards her with a place at his gymnastics school where he is principal. But granny insists on coming too, and this is causing problems at Morag's new school.
- Anna, the Animals' Friend – Anna Martin loves her job with the Animals' Protection Society. The town where Anna lives are having their biggest argument for years. The River Board has suggested some of the swans on the river should be shot and there has been a storm of protest following the decision.
- Anne All-Alone – Anne Pryor's happiness is shattered when her parents are killed in a car accident. She begins to settle in an orphanage, when a misunderstanding with the other girls causes them to think she told tales on a girl.
- Anne Proctor Animal Doctor – Anne Proctor works as an assistant veterinary surgeon to Stamford's circus.
- Aunt Hard Heart – Cassie Martin is pleased when her aunt, Hazel Grey, a well known children's writer, offers her a home after the sudden death of her parents. But Cassie soon starts to wonder if her aunt is really sincere in her concern for her – or if she actually likes children at all!
- Babalu - Humour strip about a young girl named Babalu. Also rather controversial by modern standards, as the character was drawn in blackface.
- Babs the Breadwinner: When Babs Thomson's father is injured in a motor crash, Babs takes over earning the family's keep. Babs shows a great flair for business and quickly builds up a thriving milk round in the Greville Housing Estate where she lives.
- Baby, Baby!: Kelly had not been keen when her mother was expecting a baby, but changes her mind when the baby arrives. However, Kelly is becoming too obsessed with the baby; she just cannot stop talking about him and this is aggravating her classmates.
- Backstreet Ballerina: Barbara Taylor runs ballet lessons in the East End of London in a converted stable. She takes in Jessie Tandy, a problem girl on the brink of being sent to approved school, in the hope that ballet will tame her as ballet is one thing that Jessie loves. But the girls are not friendly to Jessie because their parents have forbidden it, and this is making Jessie aggressive again.
- Backstreet Hospital – When Nurse Mary Travers returns from the Crimean War, she sets up her own hospital for needy children, helped by Liza Parkin.
- Ballerina On A String – When Jenny Lane realises she is not wanted by her aunt and uncle, she runs away and gets a job in a marionette theatre as Sugar Plum, the ballerina puppet. Someone guesses Jenny's secret and wants to help her continue her ballet training, but she can only guess at her mystery friend's identity.
- Balloon of Doom – Katherine Williams is not happy when her younger sister Sarah brings home a sinister looking balloon. She suspects that the balloon also has something to do with the violent weather and destruction that has been happening in the town.
- Barbara's Baby Elephant – Barbara Wallace has an unusual pet, a baby elephant, Busker.
- Base-Line Barbie – After injuring her leg in an accident, Barbie Mason is told she will never play tennis again. But Barbie is determined too become a tennis champion despite her damaged leg.
- Beggar's Academy – Orphan Sarah Blane is sure she has found her long lost sister, Martha, working for a mysterious woman called 'The Duchess' who runs a school for beggars. Sarah wis determined to win the girls confidence and affection, so that they could be reunited and live together with Sarah's guardians, so she joins the academy in the hopes of getting close to 'Martha'.
- Bella the Bookworm – A comic strip about a girl who loves books.
- Bella of Bonnybanks School - Bella is an elephant belonging to Princess Sarita, a minor Indian princess who has become a pupil at the Bonnybanks School for Girls. Bella duly becomes the school's treasured mascot, and the focus of several adventures, including an attempted kidnapping.
- Belle of the Ball – Belle Brown owned a ball that developed strange powers after being treated by some space travellers from the planet Orbis. They used the ball to learn about Earth.
- Bess And Her Pup – A humour strip about Bess and her pup Pooch. Often they end up in some sort of trouble.
- Betrayed!: Michelle and Sharon are best friends. But the girls fall out when Michelle sees Sharon with her boyfriend Greg and feels betrayed.
- Bighead – Tina Patterson has never made many friends because she is quiet and shy. Then her good-looking but big-headed cousin Joe arrives and suddenly everyone wants to be friends with her! Tina knows they just want to get to Joe, but she does not care because she is being noticed at last.
- Bike Rider – Sandy Clark's uncle, an inventor, builds her an unusual bike – a computerised super bike that can talk and even fly. But only Sandy and her uncle know about its unusual powers, everyone else wonders who the mysterious rider is.
- Billy Basset – A story narrated by a pup named Billy. While his owner Sally prepares him for shows, her mother's dog Stan, an Afghan, is not happy to see Billy getting attention.
- Bimbo And Her Baby – A girl finds a baby in the park and decides to look after it.
- Bird Girl: Lynn Fairfax and her artist father move to the Italian village of Torricelli. Lynn encounters a mysterious girl who has a strange way with birds. She soon finds the mysterious girl is trying to save the birds from trappers and decides to lend a hand. But Lynn has to win the girl's confidence as the girl seems to be afraid of her.
- Bonnie and Claude – Bonnie and Claude Plank are a pair of ballroom dancers who always seem to find trouble – luckily they are helped out by their young friend, Laura Balmain.
- Bonny and Clydesdale – Bonny and Cly, a Clydsdale horse, are cursed by Whirlin the Wizard, and are banished until they find the Golden Gooseberry. As part of the spell, Bonny can understand Cly.
- Born to Dance – Catherine Collins is a born ballerina but her grandmother has forbidden her to dance. Gran is afraid that Catherine will have a fatal accident like her late mother.
- Botany Belle: The scheming governess Miss Fallon switches Lady Merrilee Manners, the ward of Sir Anthony Manners and heiress to Roxham Hall, with Belle Thorn, a thief. As a result, Lady Merrilee gets five years in Botany Bay for theft while Miss Fallon passes off Belle as Merrilee.
- Boy Blue the Rockin' Robot: Johnny Freeman, a student scientist, creates a humanoid robot called Boy Blue. By chance, Johnny's sister Janet discovers Boy Blue can sing and sets about turning him into a pop star.
- Boyfriend from Blupo – A girl who wants a boyfriend finds one in Morgan, an alien from the planet Blupo.
- Brassribs - When Cindy Roberts is marooned on a Pacific island, she has Brassribs, a robot butler invented by her dad, to look after her.
- Break-Up!: When a girl in Paula's class is dumped by her boyfriend, everyone talks about her. So when Paula gets dumped, she is determined not to let anyone find out.
- Bringing up the Barkers – Walter the Dalmatian disapproves of his new owners' coarse ways and is trying to teach them more genteel habits.
- Broncho Buttercup: A cow believes it is a show jumper.
- Bunty of the Barnstormers: Bunty Evans is part of performing group the Marsden Players along with Harry Hendon, who runs the show, his wife Marcia, Johnnie and Lila Crane, and Don and Dorothy Payton. They are having a difficult time and when they arrive in Linwood, the owner of the Hall that they were planning to perform in refuses to let them use it, forcing them to use an old barn instead.
- Captain Carol – Carol gets her best friend, Fiona, expelled so she can take her place as school captain. However, Carol reckons without Fiona's determination to prove her innocence.
- Captain Kate – Kate Smith is thrilled to be made Captain of Tenbury School – but she has an unfriendly rival in Vice Captain Daphne Ferrier.
- Captain Shirley – Shirley Smith is school Captain at Tenbury School. She is supported by her best friend, who helps her especially against any tricks by jealous vice-captain Daphne.
- Carey's Chickens – Red Indian raiders kill Carey Lane's parents and destroy their farm, so she travels to the Rocky Mountains to find her brother Crispin. Her only companions are a horse, a dog and two dozen chickens.
- Carla the King's Protector – Carla Gale, a young chimney sweep, overhears General Krill plotting to kill the young King, Simon the sixth, so she hides the boy in her cottage. Then Carlaa discovers that General Krill has employed a boy to take the King's place – and he is an exact double of King Simon. Now Carla must expose the General and keep the real king safe.
- Carol Of The Cowslip Express – Carol Cripps has been given the job of making the railway line the Cowslip, profitable again.
- Carrie's Choice: Carrie's parents are always arguing over nothing. To solve the problem they divide the family home, with Dad and oldest daughter Sheila living downstairs and Mum and younger sister Sarah upstairs. Carrie refuses to take sides, so she moves to the landing room, which is halfway between the two floors.
- Carrie's Magic Cookbook – A girl discovers a magical cookbook, which takes her back in time to when a recipe was first made every time she uses that particular recipe.
- Carrie's Quest – In 1850, Carrie Kenworth goes into service for the wealthy James Goodwin. When she learns that her employer's granddaughter, Olive had run away five years ago, Carrie offers to go search for her.
- Catch the Cat – Marie Bonnet is hated for being friendly with Nazi soldiers in a French town during the WW2 occupation. But this is really a cover for Marie's double life as a costumed resister known as "the Cat."
- Cathy and Her Camera – Cathy Shaw finds her camera is very useful in many situations.
- Chalk and Cheese – Cindy Seers and Sarah Jameson are very different but they both love horses and riding.
- Changes: Maxine and Deanne have been school rebels. Then Deanne moves away and Maxine calms down. But then Deanne returns, as rebellious as ever. She expects Maxine to be the same, which is causing problems for Maxine.
- Changing Places – At her new school, Lady Anne Bannerman is tricked by another new girl Anne Brown into changing names and identities and is now being blackmailed by her.
- Cheerful Cherry Martin – The young Cherry Martin works as under Matron at Larks Hall Prep School for boys.
- Cherry's Challenge – Fourteen-year-old Cherry Smith helps her parents run their small farm. Her best friend is a colt named Fancy that she helps break in. Cherry is trying to form a team to enter gymkhana events.
- Child of the Storm - One stormy night, a baby girl is left on the doorstep of a caravan in Colrain's Circus and is brought up by cruel Clem Sykes and his wife under the name of Janet Sykes. Twelve years later, Janet makes friends with Sonia Petrov, a trapeze artiste who recently joined the circus, but unbeknownst to Janet, Sonia was her real mother, who has to make amends for abandoning her.
- Children of Misery – Rosemary Wilson has been taken prisoner by the Arkans, a strange people who never smile. Some of the families are now trying to escape, with Rosemary as their leader. Rosemary is puzzled as to why the Arkans do not seem to be pursuing them. Could it have a connection with the mysterious illness that is now striking the fugitives?
- Children of the Night: The evil Aunt Mabel runs an orphanage for homeless children where she shuts out sunlight on them, making them blind by day but able to navigate in the dark. This is so she can send them out to steal at night. When justice catches up with Aunt Mabel, the children are taken in by the generous and wealthy Mrs Rigby, who is given one month to reform them.
- Chloe's Choice: Chloe Morris likes her new stepfather, but finds she has to choose between him and Mum all the time.
- Christie's Children – Christie Dove, who has been brought up in Ecclesfield Poorhouse, discovers that she is really Lady Christabel Deverel, heiress to a great fortune. Although she is taken to begin a new life at Deverel Hall with her Aunt Edith, she is determined to help the poor children she left behind, even if it meani doing it in secret.
- Cinderella of the Orphanage – Cindy Winters has grown up in Oldbank Orphanage When she is old enough, she is given the letter and a photograph that her mother left with her as a baby. The photo is of 4 young girls in costumes and this is the starting point for Cindy to try to track down her mother.
- Circus Susie – After the sudden death of her father, Susie Nelson takes over the running of Nelson's Super Circus. The young girl is in danger from Ferro, the strongman, who has always wanted to own the circus and plans to get rid of her. Luckily Susie also has a friend looking out for her, Carlo the clown.
- Clare- The Children's Champion – After a cholera epidemic, Sir Frederick Winton, a wealthy man decides to help orphan children taking them into his home. Clare Gaston is the first orphan he rescues and she becomes responsible for supervising the other children.
- Claremount College – Clara Lawson inherits Claremount College and decides to teach any lesson her students want.
- Click-Click Clara: Clara Jones acquires an instant camera that can take photographs that show a prediction about the subject being photographed. Clara finds she can change the future, but doing so either works out well or it doesn't.
- Cobweb Castle – The Carters are left a dilapidated castle by Mr. Carter's old commanding officer after he dies. They open the castle to the public to help pay for the repairs.
- Codey – Amy inherits her Great Uncle Harry's ventriloquist dummy, which surprises her as she did not know him that well. What surprises her more though is when Codey (the dummy) starts talking to her. He gets her in trouble when people think she is throwing her voice, saying nasty things. He wants to make it big, but Amy tries to refuse. He threatens her family, so she has to go along with things.
- Come Home, Kathleen – In 1930s Ireland, Kathleen O'Connell lives happily with her family, even though they don't have much money. Then her mother's sister Therese arrives over from England with her daughter Emma, and they propose to relieve the O'Connell's burden a bit by adopting Kathleen as a companion for Emma. But the Laceys are actually struggling to keep their usual lifestyle and they expect Kathleen to work as a servant in return for taking her in. Kathy is very homesick but is unable to afford her fare back to Ireland, so she has to think of some way to get home. The trouble increases when Britain goes to war, Kathy and Emma are evacuated to stay with a cruel woman named Miss Jardine, and Emma's mother is killed in a bombing.
- Connie and her Colt: Connie Meridew is keeping her colt, Quicksilver, in a builder's yard owned by her father. Heather Dawson, a schoolgirl enemy of Connie's, sets the council on Connie, who send her a letter saying she needs to remove Quicksilver, so Connie tries to find him a new stable.
- Cora The Cookery Kid – Cora Rochester is very keen on cooking, and wins a trip to Paris to study French cooking.
- Cotton Jenny – Belle Merrimac and her slave girl Jenny are travelling North during the American Civil War, to find Belle's father and Jenny's brother who are prisoners.
- Cousin Carrie: When Melanie's cousin Carrie comes to stay, she upsets Melanie's friends with her arrogance and rudeness.
- Daisy Bell – A wordless humour strip, featuring a young girl.
- Dancing for Joy: Joy Layton has always wanted to be a ballerina, but her parents cannot afford ballet lessons. Madame Camille offers Joy free tuition, but Joy's rough background is causing problems, from both the snobby pupils and the kids at her school, who think ballet is for snobs. When Madame Camille enters Joy and another pupil, Fiona Smethshurst, for a scholarship, Fiona is out to make sure she is the one who gets the scholarship.
- Danger Doll – One evening when Jemma Johnson is babysitting a young girl named Caroline, they receive an unexpected visitor – a doll! Later there is a mysterious fire and Caroline and the doll disappear. At first Jemma is blamed but when other children go missing, Jemma is asked to help solve the mystery. Does the doll have anything to do with it?
- Danger Girl – Danger Girl, codenamed "Z", is the prettiest and toughest agent in Britain's Secret Service.
- Danny Boy: Donna is crazy about new boy Danny. But he is not taking any notice of her. Donna's friends try to get them together, but are not having much luck.
- Dark Days for Dolly – Orphaned Dolly stands to inherit a fortune from her dying foster mother, whose relatives scheme to force Dolly out of the house and claim her inheritance.
- Darke Days: The Darke family change house, and strange things begin to happen. Melissa Darke, who is superstitious, senses bad vibes, and they seem to be focused on the pendant she wears. The family starts arguing for no reason, noises are heard in the night, and an apparition appears among other spooky things.
- Dear Dave: Friends Gina Wood and Wendy Hall both fancy Dave Bell. When Dave asks Wendy out, Gina is pleased for her friend, but Dave's nasty sister, Marsha, gets hold of some letters Gina wrote, but never sent, saying how much she likes Dave, and uses them to blackmail Gina.
- Debbie's Debt – Jealous Paula interferes with Debbie's bike. When an accident ensues, it is Paula who finds the injured Debbie. Paula proceeds to exploit her family's indebtedness and wealth.
- Debbie's Diary: When Debbie King's family move house, she forgets to take her diary. Debbie is anxious to get her diary back as it contains some compromising entries about pretend dates. Debbie makes friends with Melanie Ward, who has moved into her house, hoping Melanie will help her get her diary back. But when Melanie finds out what Debbie wants, she starts blackmailing her.
- Destiny Calls Rosita – gypsy girl Rosita is determined to become a ballerina, but the ballet mistress dislikes her and is trying to get rid of her.
- Detestable Della – During World War II the Japanese invade Malaya and the children of a mission school are captured. Della Mornay pretends to work for the Japanese while secretly helping the prisoners, who think she is a traitor.
- Dina Must Dance! – Dina Lee, a gypsy girl, is given a free place at the Linden house Ballet School and she is not too pleased at giving up her carefree life. Then she receives a gypsy warning that she is in danger and she suspects jealous snob Paula may be out to hurt her.
- Distant Cousin – Jenny Clayton goes to Larchwood Boarding School, where her cousin Claire is a pupil. But Jenny discovers that the girl claiming to be her cousin Claire is not.
- Doctor Fido – Thirteen-year-old Sally Downes lives at Bridge House Children's Home where she likes helping out with the younger children. When an injured dog wanders into the grounds, Sally takes care of him, and he becomes a firm favourite with the children, who name him Doctor Fido.
- Dolwyn's Dolls – In one of the narrow cobbled streets of Northwich is the doll shop owned by Megan Dolwyn. She tells customers stories about the dolls.
- Don't Cry For Me! – In Britain, in the year 1940, after her father is lost at sea, Nancy Nelson goes to live at Morvel Mansion, along with several evacuees. The manor house is really an old people's home and there is often trouble between the young and the old. Later Nancy becomes convinced her father is actually alive. She is proven right but it appears her father is working for the Germans. Despite the evidence, Nancy refuses to believe her father is a traitor.
- Don't Date Damon!: When Chris dumps Tricia in a rather badly handled manner, she expects her friend Kirsty to dump Damon in sympathy as he is a friend of Chris. But Kirsty cannot bring herself to do it, so she is trying to date Damon in secret from Tricia.
- Don't Speak to Me, Mum! – Shirley Weston lives at Bunbury Castle where her mother was cook to Sir Charles Merrywill. When Shirley wins a scholarship to Rossdene, a private boarding school, she finds most of the girls were from wealthy families. When Shirley's friends mistake her for Sir Charle's niece, she does not deny it, but problems arise when Shirley's mother takes a job as a cook at the school.
- Donna's Donkeys – After a trip to the seaside, Donna Williams returns with an old donkey which had been cruelly treated. Her parents are dismayed and put her story to the local newspaper in the hope of finding the donkey a new home. Instead Donna is left a hundred donkeys by an old woman who ran a donkey sanctuary and read the newspaper article before she died.
- Donna's Double Life – Grange and Forden schools are bitter enemies. When Forden pupil Donna Wade suddenly transfers to Grange, she leads a double life to keep her friends at both schools from finding out.
- Donna's Double – Sophie Benson and Donna West are best friends. When Donna moves away, she loses touch with Sophie with no explanation. Then Sophie and her family move. At her new school, Sophie encounters Wendy Smith, whom she soon realises is really Donna. But Donna is acting very strangely – she is behaving in a timid, frightened manner and does not acknowledge Sophie. When Sophie tackles Donna, she admits she is Donna but begs Sophie to keep calling her Wendy. Sophie agrees, but is determined to find out what is going on.
- Dopey Dora – the Hope of the School: Dora Spoone is the dimmest pupil at Eversford School, and is also the school klutz – everything she does goes wrong. Yet the school computer picks her as the most brilliant scholar, so she is entered along with five other clever pupils in the School of the Year Contest. Ironically, it is Dora's blundering that is pulling the team through to success. All the same, her teammates want to get rid of her.
- Dorinda from the Deep: Kelly Mann, a sculptor, takes on a commission of the ballerina, Dorinda, for the new ballet theatre. She is unsure of her ability, is having trouble finding the purest white stone required, and there is a strange storm. She finds on a beach a stone, starts work, and finds that the statue is beginning to take shape on its own.
- Double Trouble!: When old Mrs Perkins wrongly accuses Julie Bates of breaking a street light, she puts a curse on her. The curse causes an evil double, Shadow, to appear whenever Julie is in the dark or dim light, and Julie keeps getting the blame for the trouble Shadow causes.
- Down with St Desmond's! – Carol-Anne Brabazon is out to ruin a school because she believes her mother was unjustly expelled.
- Dream Boy: Kerry Simpson is obsessed with the new pop group, Dream Boyz. Her obsession has caused her to lose friends and her boyfriend, and it is even getting her into trouble at school. Claire Thomas has stood by Kerry, but even that friendship is put under stress when Kerry tries to blackmail Claire into babysitting her Dream Boyz collection after her parents order her to get rid of it.
- Duel of the Dolls – Wendy Taylor and her parents return to Britain after two years in South America. But her father has made an enemy who puts an evil spell on Bobby, one of Wendy's dolls. In attempt to counteract the spell, a friend of the family uses 'good' magic to enable the other doll, Betty, to protect Wendy from harm.
- Electra of the Evil Eye – Electra, an orphan, comes to live with Gina Soames and her mother. Mrs Soames thinks Electra is the best foster child she has ever cared for, but Gina does not trust the girl, as she feel there is something sinister about her. Some strange occurrences happen like sudden fires and Gina believes Electra is involved.
- Elvirita - While on holiday in Germany, Elvirita's parents die of Polio. She plans to return to Spain and live with her old nurse, but on the way the plane crashes. Luckily, Elvirita survives but is left stranded in a Swiss village with no money to get back to Barcelona.
- Ernie's Girl – The Police Chief's computer, Electronic Random Name Indicator Extraordinary (Ernie), selects dizzy W.P.C. Dora Wiggins as the person most likely to succeed. Dora does not agree with this – but the chief believes his computer could not be wrong, and to her dismay he promotes her anyway.
- Eve All Alone: When Gemma Halliday's parents are unable to take her to Hong Kong, she is sent to spend the summer with Great Aunt Lyn in the country. Aunt Lyn is very nice, but Gemma still wishes to be with her parents and is very bored with nothing to do. In the attic, however, she comes across an old diary, written during World War Two by an evacuee named Eve, and learns that Eve had to endure much worse things during her evacuation.
- Fairweather Friend: Jenny Cooper's mother makes up with her sister after a falling out years before, and she and Jenny go to stay with the aunt while Mr Cooper goes abroad. But the cousin, Rachel Fairweather, is going astray and getting in with a rough crowd, and Jenny is getting the blame for the trouble she causes. But Mum is anxious to keep the peace, having only just made up with her sister, and this is making it more difficult for Jenny to speak out.
- Falling Star: Kim Weller finds becoming a pop star is not all great as she begins to lose all her old friends.
- False Friend – Sneaky Karen pretends to be friends with wealthy Natalie in order to take advantage of her.
- Fame at her Fingertips - Disabled Joyce Landon's one aim in life is to be a famous concert pianist, but her mother refuse, to give her any support or allow her to play the grand piano at home. Joyce is able to get into the local School of Music and pay for her uniform herself, but things get worse when her grandmother, the only person to support her, dies.
- Fan-Fan and her Friends - A humorous cartoon story about a girl named Fan-Fan and her group of friends.
- Five Dads For Diana – When Diana Parsons widowed father dies, he appoints five of his friends as her legal guardians. Four of the men are professors and one is an expert in physical training, so Diana is home schooled, which she finds to be a lonely life.
- Flight to Freedom – Eileen Masters, one of a team of British gymnasts, is left behind in Lobovia to look after the team's baggage. In one of the equipment baskets she finds Valerie Dimitric the star gymnast of Lobovia. The authorities refuse Valerie permission to leave the country, so with Eileen's help, Valerie tries to escape.
- Flower Power – Donna Mason helps her disorganised parents run Seaview Hotel. Things get really interesting when the new maid, Blossom, arrives – she is from another planet. As her name suggests, she is really a flower species.
- Follow the Dragon – Five Edgecombe Girls' School pupils are stranded in the African jungle after a plane crash. Their tough teacher Miss Hardiman, known as "The Dragon" is determined to lead them to safety.
- For Sam's Sake: Anna Thorpe and her brother Sam are being fostered out to the Sanders family while their mother is in hospital. Anna was not keen on living in the Sanders household because the daughter, Carla, is a spiteful, snobby, spoiled girl who always picks on her. But Anna decides to do so for the sake of Sam, who does want to stay. But Carla is trying to get rid of them, so Anna has to constantly watch out for her tricks.
- Forbidden Island – Jenny Weston goes to live with her uncle and aunt. On an island, she discovers two more relatives living in a run-down house. They have to live there for three months to fulfil the conditions of a will. To make things worse, they have fallen out with the aunt and uncle. Jenny is determined to bridge the gap.
- Forbidden to Ride – Amnesic Anne West tries to find out what caused her to lose her memory.
- Forever Friends? - Jodie wins a place at a stage and screen school. She wants to keep her friends from her old school as well as make friends at the new one, but she is finding it difficult being pulled in two directions.
- Framed! – Carly Bell's mother is an artist and writer of picture stories for a Bunty-esque comic named "Jenni". She discusses her new idea with Carly – a family called the Swifts begin to have falling outs after winning the pools. Carly thinks the characters aren't realistic, they are too good to begin with to suddenly have fights over money, so her mother decides to scrap the entire idea. Unfortunately for Carly, the Swifts come to life and are furious that their series was scrapped, so they decide to teach her a lesson. Each of the Swifts take a turn at playing tricks on her, including the dog.
- Fran's Foxes – Fran Graham lives in the middle of the city. When she finds three orphaned fox cubs in the basement of a derelict building, she starts to look after them secretly.
- Freckles and her Frog – Freckles Wilson, an orphan, lived with her relatives on their farm on the edge of the Florida Swamps. They treat her cruelly and Freckles' only friend is a pet frog she calls Ferdy.
- Friend or Foe?: Karen Fielding's parents make her change schools because she got mixed up with a bad crowd. At her new school, Karen finds herself in the same class as a group of girls the bad crowd hates. For this reason Karen secretly causes trouble for them while pretending to be friendly. Then Karen comes to her senses and stops her campaign. But when the bad crowd find out about Karen's change of heart, they swear vengeance.
- Friendly Frances – Frances Thornton works for the "Can We Help U Agency", and gets sent on a variety of assignments.
- Gelda- The Girl From The Glacier – Gelda had been frozen in a glacier years ago. When an unexpected thaw frees her she discovers that warmth from fire or the sun could kill her. She can only venture out of her ice cave at night or on overcast days.
- Georgie and Griff – Georgie Mair comes to Camelot to attend Camelot Ladies' College and stay with Professor Hyslop, her uncle. Georgie has brought with her Griff, her invisible pet griffin.
- Ghost Train: When Nikki Turner and her parents move into a converted railway station, a ghost train starts haunting them. When Nikki investigates, she finds herself travelling back in time as various passengers on the train.
- Ghosthunters: Jilly, Sue and Natalie decide to go ghost hunting, and their hunt takes an unexpected turn.
- Gilly of the Flower Garden – The adventures of a girl who works at a garden centre.
- Gita Guitar – Gita Jones is determined to play her guitar and earn her fare to America in the hopes of finding her father.
- Give Us a Clue!: Sherryl Holmes gets ideas about being a detective – to the consternation of her friend Lisa Watts.
- Glenda the Gimmick Girl – Advertisement agency worker Glenda is excellent at coming up with ideas for various things.
- Gold Medal Girl – Gail Gordon's ambition is to win a gold medal at the Olympic Games. But the problem is whether she should concentrate on running or swimming. Gail prefers athletics, but she cannot escape from Martha Moor, her ruthless swimming coach. Jim Cook, Gail's athletic coach, is trying to rescue her from Martha's evil clutches.
- Goode Neighbours: Twins Jo and Jill Davie are intrigued when the Goode family move in next door. But they soon find there is something very odd about the Goodes. For one thing, they seem to possess super strength and don't show emotion. They also seem to be out to take things over with the expression "Whatever I'll do, it'll be for your own good. I will look after you."
- Good Move? - Gemma is staying with her trendy night while her mum is in hospital. Gemma has been looking forward to living with her aunt, but things aren't working out like she hoped.
- Grow Up, Granny! – Polly's irresponsible grandmother must learn to behave respectably in order to be approved as Polly's legal guardian.
- Haggis – A short humour strip that follows a Scotty dog.
- Handy Mandy – A humour strip about a young woman, Mandy who does odd jobs, that rarely go right.
- Hanna's Hopeless- But She Keeps Trying! – Hanna Brent is injured in an accident and ends her dreams of becoming a dancer like the rest of her family. She sees an opportunity to become a different dancer when she sees synchronised swimming club.
- Hannah in the House of Dolls – Disguised as a disabled waif, Hannah Weston takes a job in a strange doll shop called "The House of Dolls" so she can investigate the shop and secretly help the young children who are made to work in the shop. She soon learns that Mrs. Scradget, the owner of the shop, is using the dolls to commit robberies – by transferring the life energy of waifs into the dolls, she is able to bring the dolls to life, and when they are bought by rich parents for their child, they rob the houses of the rich people in the middle of the night and take all their ill-gotten gains back to Mrs. Scradget.
- Hannah of Horse Haven – 13-year-old Hannah Stanway starts up a horse haven for old and unwanted ponies at her parents farm.
- Happy Hannah – When Hannah Perkins and her siblings are orphaned, they are sent to live with their Uncle who runs an eating house. Uncle Ernest only agrees to keep the children out of the workhouse if Hannah sings to entertain his customers.
- Harriet's Chariot – Harriet Jones has an unusual holiday job. She is employed as a crime-buster by millionaire, Mandy Maxon. Harriet is assisted by a robot car and its robot chauffeur, Robert.
- Hateful Harriet – Peg Roberts has to keep Harriet Marlowe out of trouble in school, or else her widowed mother will be fired by middle manager, Mr. Carrick. The troublesome lying Harriet has been expelled from many schools, and is sent to live with the Roberts as well. Of course, Harriet causes Peg all sorts of trouble, and has the teachers fooled that she is a sweet girl.
- Haunted Hotel – Kirsty and her family run a hotel that is also occupied by ghosts, who let out rooms to fellow ghosts as well! Only Kirsty can see them, though they can appear to other people if they choose. Kirsty becomes friends with the ghost of her age, Grisly.
- Haven of Hope – In the year 1880, the Honourable Hilary Lacey loses both her parents. Hilary decides to use her wealth by providing a home for waifs and strays from the workhouse. But the Beadle Mr. Higgins is plotting against Hilary with a young accomplice – a boy named Jack.
- Heartbreak House – When Penny Wellman moves into Corbie House, spooky and frightening things keep happening to her.
- Help... – Leon, a computer whizz, has gone missing. While everyone believes he ran off due to school pressure, his brother Rick thinks that something has happened to him. He confides in Kim of his theory and after finding a message from Leon on a striped disk, she believes him. Unfortunately, the message disappears by the time they try to show it to others, and now they must find the other disks.
- Her From Up There – Mirra is from the Planet Santos and comes to Earth to convince people to visit her planet on their summer holidays.
- Her Guardian Angel – When a new charlady comes to work at the home of Charlotte Colwell, the girl becomes strangely drawn to the woman. Unable to accept the friendship between Charlotte and the servant, her parents send her away to a strict school, but the charlady gets a job at the school and helps Charlotte out whenever she can.
- Her Hideaway Highness – Pat Fraser is acting as groom for her sister, Brenda, an international show-jumper, while she is on tour in Tarlania. During the tour, the dethroned King asks Pat to smuggle his daughter out of the country. Although disguised as another groom called Sara, snooty Princess Saria does no work to help Pat.
- Her Highness Tamora Schoolgirl Princess - Princess Tamora of Teru leaves her home in the sunny South Seas to come to school in England. Her parents, the King and Queen of the island, were so impressed with Jane Taker, a missionary from England who had visited the island many years before, that they decided to educate their daughter at the same school as the missionary. Tamora arrives at the school, where both her unusual ideas and her seven handmaidens cause quite a sensation.
- Heroines Of History – The stories of famous females from history.
- Hetty - Follows a young girl in humorous situations.
- Hetty of Harriman's Hotel – Hetty Cuthbert goes to Harriman's Hotel looking for a job but is mistaken for the owner's niece, Helen. Meanwhile, the manager Felix and his secretary Beryl have plans to take over the hotel.
- Holiday Romance!: Katie Simpson meets Clive on a holiday in Spain and wants to keep up with the romance after the holiday. But she is encountering difficulties in doing so, and things get even more complicated when a new boy next door asks Katie out.
- Home Alone!: Gina Gordon and Gabby Andrews are fostered by Mr and Mrs Wood. Unfortunately the girls hate each other and each starts playing tricks to get rid of the other. The inevitable result is that both girls are sent back to the Children's Home in disgrace. Gabby and Gina now realise their folly, but need to come up with a way to convince the Woods of this.
- Hope Street – In 1898, Caroline Osborne, the daughter of Dr Benjamin Osborne, has a difficult time with her chosen profession after her father dies. Her mother and uncle do not support her, and she does not have any better luck outside her family either, being rejected by all the jobs she applies for. When one of the maids points out there is plenty of work at a poorer end of town, even if they cannot pay much, Caroline buys a warehouse on Hope Street to set up a clinic.
- Hot Gossip!: Everyone thinks the Mount Comp school magazine is boring. Then the ALTERNATIVE school mag appears, and it is filled with gossip and poison pen lies about staff and pupils. Its venom is particularly aimed at one pupil named Ali. Nobody knows who is producing it, and it keeps appearing despite the head's warnings. Ali's brother and friends start detective work to track down the culprit.
- Humpy Dumpy: Hilarious adventures with Flora MacVicar and her pet – the Loch Ness Monster!
- I Don't Like Dogs!: Mrs Kemp has terrible cynophobia (fear of dogs) and this fear passes on to her daughter Helen. After Mrs Kemp dies, Dad finds a new girlfriend, Rowena, but when Helen sees she has a golden retriever, Benji, her cynophobia starts causing problems with the new relationship.
- I Want to Dance! – In the year 2082, Denny McCae is disconnected with life in a hard-working world where music and dancing are banned. Her closest friend is a robot, Miki. After finding a tape recording of Swan Lake, Denny won't be happy until she learns to dance. She gets sent to a school where there is a secret ballet class that takes place in the basement at night time. It is run by the mysterious Alana and everyone has to hide their identity.
- I Want to Go Home! – When Kate and Kim Parker's parents divorced, Kate decided to stay with their Mum, while Kim chose to stay with their Dad. For the first time in 6 months, Kim was to come stay with her mum and sister for the holidays. It is quite a change for her, as since Dad got a promotion Kim has been used to living in style in a large country house. Even though mum and Kate make an effort to make things nice and fun, she wants to go home. Kim gets her wish when their mum falls sick and they have to go to their fathers while she recovers. Now Kate is feeling uncomfortable, while Kim shows her around pointing out all the nice things they have, Kate feels she would prefer her dad to be home to greet them like their mum would.
- I'll Make You Miss World: Sarah Taylor hardly seems Miss World material. She is tomboyish, tough, slovenly, does not care for her appearance or charm, hates makeup, works as a mechanic, and thinks the idea of becoming Miss World is ludicrous. Nonetheless, Sarah's sister Alice is convinced that Sarah does have what it takes to become Miss World and sets out to turn Sarah into a beauty queen. But the problems Alice has to surmount with Sarah are not making the road to the Miss World title easy.
- I'll Never Forgive You! – When Carol Hastings runs away, her mother has a bad accident while looking for her. Carol's relationship with her father becomes embittered because he blames her for the accident and swears "I'll never forgive you!" if Mum does not recover.
- I'll Play for Pauline! – Penny Harris is given a violin that had once belonged to a girl, Pauline Harcourt, who died of a broken heart because she could not master the instrument. Pauline's unhappy spirit wants Penny to succeed where she had failed.
- In My Sister's Shadow – Jo feels she is always living in the shadow of her older sister Susan. The situation gets worse when Susan moves back a year because of illness and joins Jo's class.
- In Paula's Place – Carrie Weaver is excited when she is fostered by the Hunts, but then she realizes they are still grieving over the death of their daughter Paula. Strange things happen after Carrie moves into Paula's old room and wears her old ring.
- In Petra's Place – When Petra, third year form captain at Medford Manor Boarding School, is hospitalised with appendicitis, her deputy Carla takes over. Carla enjoys the role so much that when Petra returns, Carla keeps sabotaging her so as to keep her position. But then Carla's conscience begins to trouble her.
- In Pippa's Place - Penny Ward and Pippa Benson are cousins, and both girls are adopted. Penny discovers that on the day of their adoption either parents could have taken either baby. Pippa has very wealthy parents and Penny resents her good life, so she begins causing trouble for Pippa.
- In Search of Sabre – In 1882, Abigail Courage is left orphaned after terrible storms flooded the American Flatlands and her house is destroyed. Her dog Sabre also survives the flooding but is stolen from her soon after. Abigail vows to find him and begins a perilous journey across dangerous mountains.
- In the Picture – Jodie Brown buys a camera which can take photographs of the future.
- Inky at St Ives: Inky is a pup with the gift of the gab, so he tells his own stories of his life as a watchdog at St Ives Boarding School.
- Innocent Angela: Angela Seymour is a new girl at Wynminster School. She looks an innocent-looking girl, but in fact she is a plant who has been placed at Wynminster by her aunt and uncle, who run the rival school, Greenwoods. Her mission is to destroy Wynminster.
- Invisible Isla – Isla Nordon accidentally drinks one of her scientist father's experimental potions and turns invisible. Isla wears a skin-like latex suit while her father tries to find an antidote.
- It Takes Two to Tango! – Lady Hannah Hutley loves ballroom dancing and much to her mother's disgust, she chooses the rough Fred Higgs as her partner.
- It's All Go With Jo! – Jo Butler lives in a small town, and when she can get time away from keeping house for her tough step-father and young step sister, Maggie, her one enjoyment is cycling.
- It's in the Book! – Sally Barton is a bookworm but her parents believe she should be out meeting new people and getting fresh air, so they sign her up for an adventure holiday on an American island. Unfortunately, Sally and the other girls are separated from their holiday leader, and land on an uninhabited island. Janice, a bossy girl, decides to take charge, but it is Sally with all her book knowledge that is the better equipped to handle the situation.
- Jackie Frost – When twelve-year-old Jacinda, a scullery maid from over a hundred years before, is found frozen solid in an old ice house at Sally Master's new home, Sally and her parents decide to pass her off as a cousin, renaming her Jackie Frost.
- Jane’s Jungle Ark - Jungle Jane builds an ark to rescue animals stranded in the huge lake formed by a new hydro-electric dam.
- Janet's Jungle School – Janet Spence teaches at a school in Ubango, Africa. She also teaches children from the neighbouring Lukango, which can cause problems as there is a feud between the two villages.
- Jealous! – Joanna West is chosen to star in a shampoo advert. She does not know that her older sister, Lindsay, who wanted the job herself, is very jealous.
- Jeannie and Her Genie – Jeannie McLaren owns a magical necklace – whenever she rubs it a genie named Perki appears to do whatever she commands. Unfortunately, Perki is still a "learner" genie and things often go wrong.
- Jenny Proctor, Doll Doctor – Jenny sets up a toy hospital to mend broken toys.
- Jill And The Juke Box Gang – Jill Maynard hopes to stop the local youth club the Juke Box from being closed down, by putting on an original ballet.
- Jill – Junior Reporter - Jill Buchanan is a trainee reporter at the Winchlea Gazette.
- Joking Apart: Gail Moody and Charlotte Franklins are best friends who have formed a comedy double act and it is proving successful. They are anxious to keep their friendship together after they discover that their act is no good when they do it on their own. But difficulties arise that test their friendship. They end up falling out for real but have to pretend to be friends for the sake of the act – and then news of their bust-up is leaked to the newspapers. They suspect that Gail's boyfriend Daniel Rigg is causing the trouble and set a trap for him.
- Josie the Gymnast – Josie Jenkins mother works as a cleaner at the local gymnasium, where "Scotty" Alex, a gymnastics coach, catches Josie playing on the apparatus. Recognizing her talent, he decides to give her private instruction.
- Joy At Sunny Acres – Joy Barnes helps out at her father's farm Sunny Acres. She is a good problem solver and often helps out her neighbours as well.
- Jumping Jack - Tara Trent is looking after Jack, an abandoned pony who proves to be a natural jumper. Tara is working as groom for Mrs Lacey and has accompanied her and her daughter, Stella, to Ireland. Stella and Tara both enter the working class pony competition.
- Just Call Me Kate! – Princess Katherine of Estelstein is a new pupil at the Highdene School for Girls. But she does not stand on ceremony and asked the other pupils to call her Kate. However, her prim lady-in-waiting Prunella Smith-Smythe is determined the princess be treated royally. She takes her job so seriously, she even joins Kate in the classroom.
- Just Friends - Carly has been best friends with Joe, a boy who lives in the same road, since they were kids. But now she is starting to see Joe as more than just a friend.
- K.O.S. – Kelly Wilson has got her dream job as a presenter on the top children's weekend morning show, K.O.S. (Kids On Saturday).
- Kate Must Skate! – After the death of her mother, Kate Preston tries to run the family home. Her ambition is to learn to skate, but it'k difficult as she tries to look after her Dad and brothers, Simon and Mike, at the same time.
- Katie's Kittens: Katie Brown finds nine abandoned kittens in a shed on her father's new farm. She keeps them a secret while finding homes for them as she fears they will be put down.
- Katy at St. K's/Sara at St. K's – Follows a group of girls at a boarding school, St. Katherine's. Firstly new girl Katy joins the school. Later the story returned with a different new girl, Sara.
- Katy O'Connor – Katy O'Connor is a nurse and a good problem solver.
- Katy Of Coronation Flats – Katy Brent lives at Cornation Flats where her father works as caretaker. She often helps out her neighbours with problems they have.
- Katy the Cabby: Katy Talbot's father runs a taxi service, but then there is a mysterious fire in which his taxi is destroyed. The Talbots suspect Tim Blundstone, who runs a rival taxi service, but cannot prove it. Katy restarts the family taxi business with an old-fashioned horse and cab, but Blundstone is out to sabotage her.
- Katy's School for Animals – Katy Barnham, daughter of the owner the Barnham Circus, helps look after and train the animals for the circus.
- Kay of the 5 Horse-Shoes – Kay starts work as a stable-hand at a famous riding school.
- Kids Of The Big Top – Molly Turner's first job as a teacher is to teach the children of Comber's Circus.
- Kitty Of Copperdowne – Kitty Laird helps her father to run Copperdowne Stables.
- Lady in the Looking-Glass – Pam Fenton is plump and very plain until she finds a pair of ballet shoes that had belonged to a ballerina who had died. Pam believes the shoes had a magic power and when she wears them she feels light and graceful, and sees the reflection of a beautiful dancer in the mirror.
- Lady Lizzie – Lady Elizabeth Lydell (Lizzie Connors), an American, becomes heiress to her English grandmother, the Countess of Hunston. Arriving at her house Lizzie makes a great difference to the frosty old lady.
- Last Chance for Laura – Modelling success has gone to Laura's head. When her face is injured because of her own arrogance, Laura's twin sister Amy agrees to secretly take her place as a model until her face heals.
- Last Of The Pekes – In 1860 China is at war with Britain and France. The Royal Palace at Peking is looted and nearly all the Sacred Dogs are killed except one that is saved by Linyi, Servant of the Dogs. Linyi sets off with the Sacred Dog to meet with her Great Uncle (an abbot of Lamasery) in Tibet.
- Laurel and the Talking Doll – In Victorian times, gypsy girl Laurel Lee makes a living by giving puppet shows. Laurel's sister Leona is accused of stealing a necklace and goes on the run. One of the puppets, Fairy Goodwish, starts coming to life to give Laurel clues to track down the real thief.
- Leave it to Linda – Linda is a "Jill-of-all-Trades" who works at her father's hotel.
- Leave It To Lindy! – Linda Brown gets a job at her father's hotel involving sorting out problem guests and guests with problems.
- Leave It to Lynne: Lynne Carson helps out at her parents' seaside hotel and takes on any job that needs to be done. This leads to very interesting situations.
- Lee And Her Shadow – Lee Kerr's Uncle Simon is a scientist and makes a robot double of his niece, which she hides at her school.
- Lessons from Lindy – Angie Parsons is tired of being taken for granted. She asks pushy, selfish Lindy Marchant for lessons in how to get her own way. As a result, Angie swings to the other extreme, and ends up in a lot of trouble, before she finally understands what true assertiveness is.
- Letters of Hate – Gemma's life is not going so well these days – her boyfriend Mike dumped her and her father has lost a job. Despite all this, she seems surprisingly upbeat. Then people in her school start getting poison pen letters. Gemma and her friends Cathy and Laura decide to play detective and find out who is sending the letters.
- Life in Bunty: A diary of the week events in the fictional Bunty Office, narrated by one worker, Kirstie.
- Life with Linzi!: Lee is finding her sister Linzi is acting strangely. Then she finds Linzi is going boy mad.
- Linda Martin, the Animals’ Friend- Lindy Martin works for the Animal Protection Society, finding and helping any animal that needs it.
- Lisa The Lonely Princess – Princess Lisa runs away from home in search for her ballerina mother, who had chosen a life of ballet over royalty. Lisa later follows in her mother's footsteps and becomes a ballerina.
- Little Caroline – the Teenage Teacher: Caroline West is the youngest teacher at Ellesmere Girls’ School. She is the school's riding mistress, a subject that the headmistress, Mrs Braydon, does not fully approve of.
- Little Ghost Lost: When Rosie Webb moves with her parents to a small country town, she explores a local castle which is being demolished and takes home one of the castle stones as a keepsake. Then she discovers that Bessie, a ghostly kitchen maid, has followed her, determined to become her servant.
- Little Lulu – A humour strip with jungle girl Lulu.
- Little Miss Dynamite – Di Thomas wants to become a table tennis champion in order to earn money for a costly operation for her aunt Edith.
- Little Miss Feather Fingers - Irene Pryce, an orphan and brilliant pianist, is taken in by music teacher Madame Cherrier. The teacher had suffered tragedy in her life when she lost her husband and daughter in an accident, but Irene learns they had survived the accident.
- Little Miss Moffat – A short wordless humour strip, featuring a young girl.
- Little Moe the Eskimo – Inuk girl Monah-Panong-Took-I-Nah, known as "Little Moe", is a pupil at Badley College for Girls.
- Living A Lie! – Claire Baxter starts at Woodend School at the same time as the new headmaster, Mr Baxter. The School bullies, Laura and Tina think Claire is the Head's daughter and say they will leave Claire and her friends alone. The story spreads, but the lie is causing problems for Claire.
- Living in L.A.: Jodie Poole emigrates to Los Angeles with her family. But she is having a bad time at her new school because her classmates pick on her.
- Lona the Wonder Girl – Lona Neal has been trained by scientists as a super-girl. Now out in the real world, Lona finds that she has a lot to learn.
- Lonely Lynn – When Lynn Walsh loses her only friends, she turns to breaking up as many friendships as she can, out of pure spite. Lynn certainly breaks up a number of friendships, but it does not occur to her that someone might catch on....
- Lonesome Lucy: In World War II, Lucy Mortimer's mother is missing. Lucy is on holiday at Nurse Garfield's home under the name of Sally Dobbing. She is very surprised to find that Nurse Garfield is a duke's daughter.
- Look After Lobelia - A little girl called Lobelia arrives mysteriously at the home of Professor Peterson. Nobody knows where she is from or why she was abandoned. Later at boarding school, Lobelia amazes everyone by winning the most awards on prize day and being selected school captain. However some of the girls believe Lobelia is an infant at heart and hope to get rid of her.
- Looking after Lara – Lara Shaw has a new stepsister, Andrea, who is a few years older than she. Andrea is determined to look after her new sister, but Lara finds this a bit too fussy and over-protective.
- Looking after Lois: Tammy Webster's family are looking after a French girl, Lois Dupois, while her mother looks for a new home in Britain. Tammy discovers that Lois is a fraud who fakes poor English to take advantage of people and is playing nasty tricks to push her out.
- Looking for Lyn – Sly Jenna Archer runs away from a children's home, posing as a long-lost granddaughter to get a free ticket to an easy life.
- Lords of the Manor: The Lord family move to a large country estate that Dad has inherited from his late cousin Violet. But when they arrive, they are in for a shock – a new will has been found that leaves the manor to Olive, the other cousin who has always been snobby to the Lords. The only thing the Lords can inherit under the new will is the old railway carriage; it hardly looks fit for human habitation, but the Lords soon make it home, much to Olive's chagrin. The Lords don't believe the will is genuine and begin to fight it. But they also have to fight Olive's designs to turn the manor into a hotel and her mean tricks to get them out.
- Lucky Break!: Rachel Ward wants to get Jake to notice her. Fate, in the form of accidents for both Rachel and Jake, gets them together.
- Lucy's Legacy: Lucy Dewhurst has been living in a children's home since her parents' deaths. She has been left with a huge legacy, but wants to be fostered for herself, not her money. However, each prospective foster family fails because of her legacy.
- Lydia and the Little People – After finding the Land of the Little People, a girl is forced to be a servant by a group of leprechauns.
- Lyn Raymond – Air Stewardess – Follows career girl Lyn on her job as an air stewardess.
- Maid Marian – When Robin Hood leaves Sherwood Forest to prepare for the return of King Richard, Maid Marian takes control of the Merry Men.
- Maid Of Snow – After a rare snowfall near the home of the Duval family in the Mediterranean, a sculptor makes an ice figure based on one of the maids, Tina, for the spoilt daughter of the house. When the snow melts Suzette wants to keep her sculpture, so Tina has to play the part when demanded.
- Maid of the Mountains: Olwen Powell was found in a cave by two bachelor brothers Ben and Dai Powell when she was a baby. They raised her on the mountains isolated from the village below. She became friends with Myra Thomas a young village girl and they kept their friendship secret.
- Maid To Be A Lady – Winnie Johnson, a poor girl from London, does not know she is the daughter of Lord Marvon, the owner of the house she works as a servant in. She is the result of a previous secret marriage of Marvons.
- Maisie Mercury – Young goddess Maisie Mercury gets into trouble at the school for gods on Mount Olympus, and is consequently exiled to Earth by Jupiter and set a bizarre series of tasks in order to prove herself. But Somnus, the god who had been Maisie's tutor, tries to stop her completing her tasks because he does not want her to return to Olympus and disturb his peace and quiet.
- Mandy Must Win! – When Mandy Lawford joins the athletics club her mum belonged to in the '70s, Mrs Lawford comes out of retirement and starts racing again. Soon Mandy feels under pressure to do as well as her mum and win everything.
- Margie the Swimming Marvel – Margie Newfield is a ten-year-old orphan who lives with her brother Fred and his wife Lily. Margie wants to be a champion swimmer, even though she has never swum a stroke in her life.
- Margie's Magic Aunt – Margie Brown lives with her widowed mother, until one Halloween, when Aunt Carla came to stay. Mrs. Brown is not happy with her sister's arrival, but Margie is delighted – especially when she discovers Aunt Carla is a witch!
- Marinda, Mystery Girl Of The Sea – Marinda is a mysterious girl that lives in the sea and comes to the surface to help people at times.
- Marsha the Perfect Schoolgirl: Marsha Zenon is an alien from outer space who has been sent to Plunkett Academy to study humanity. She is unpopular at first because her knowledge is encyclopaedic, but the girls like her better as she learns to be more human.
- Mary Had A Little Ram – Mary Duff has a clever pet ram named Johnny Boy. Along with Mary's close friend Hilda they have plenty of fun together.
- Me Your Slave – Erica Morning's life is complicated by the presence of Amrita Dar, daughter of Indian Fakir. Amrita claims to be Erica's "slave" and has an awkward habit of making her "wishes" come true.
- Meg in the Middle: When Meg Walker moves to a new town, she is pleased to make friends with Vicky and Joanne, who live on either side of her. But Vicky and Joanne hate each other, and Meg is caught in the middle.
- Meggie's Magic Book When Meggie Morgan finds Merlin the Magician's spell book, he is stranded in the twentieth century. Determined to get it back Merlin follows Meggie everywhere – but to his horror she keeps trying out spells!
- Melody Lee- A Dancer She'll Be – Melody Lee was abandoned as a baby and has two goals in life, to become a ballet dancer and to find her mother. This strip was the inspiration for the song Melody Lee by English Punk Rock band The Damned written by Ray Burns AKA. Captain Sensible.
- Merry at St Mead's: Sheryl Barnes and Kirsty Connor at St Mead's Boarding School unknowingly release Merry, a mischievous fairy from medieval times who had been imprisoned in a bottle for over 500 years. In addition to her mischievous nature, Merry's lack of understanding about modern life is causing problems, such as interfering with school equipment.
- Mighty Mo – A comic strip about a Desperate Dan-esque girl who is always trying to be feminine.
- Millie Castle Nurse With Nightingale – In 1854 Millie joins with Florence Nightingale to help with nursing in Crimea during the war, against her father's wishes.
- Mindreader Mina: Wendy Watson's new neighbour, Mina, comes from the planet Septimo. As a Septimon, she has the power to read minds. But she always has to tell the truth, which sometimes gets her in trouble.
- Mirror Image – Donna is not too happy with her family or her life, and wishes that things were different. When her mother buys an old three way mirror at an antiques fayre, Donna discovers it has special qualities – each mirror leads to an alternate dimension, allowing her to experience three different lives.
- Mirror, Mirror – Emma Lonsdale is extremely shy and timid. Because of this, the only friend she has is an old mirror, which somehow manages to talk back to her!
- Miss Danby's Dolls – eccentric Miss Danby believes her dolls are alive, and her companion Lizzie Miller finds that strange things are happening about these dolls.
- Miss Fix-It of TV – Meg Newton is a trainee assistant with the Central Services Television Company. She earns the nickname "Miss Fix-It" through her ability of overcoming tricky production problems.
- Miss Merlin – A comic strip about Merlin's daughter.
- Miss Russell Stories – Evelyn Russell is a young teacher at Carton Girls' School. She takes a great interest in all her pupils and does everything she can to help them.
- Missing Melanie: New girl Abbie Kent is delighted to make friends with four girl, Kerry, Elaine, Jane and Sue. They have previously been friends with Melanie, who used to live in Abbie's house. But the girls keep comparing Abbie with Melanie, so Abbie is trying to be as much like Melanie as she can. However, this is causing problems.
- Misty: Sara has an encounter with a rider on a white horse that she cannot explain.
- Model Girl: Manda Myson starts work at her mother's modelling agency during the school holidays.
- Model Princess: Princess Lana of Berkstein is in Britain to learn social graces and perform a few public functions. A dream comes true when she is accepted by the House of Frage as a model. However, she does not dare let her Aunt Florence, the Duchess of Ranningham, find out, so she changes her name to Salty Smith and disguises herself by wearing a wig and sunglasses.
- Mojo The Milky Way Dog – Sally Jordan befriends a stray dog, Mojo, who turns out to be a talking dog from the Milky Way.
- Molly in Lonely Wood – Molly is reliant on a wheelchair, but helps a naturalist who is writing a book about the animals that live in a wood near her home.
- Molly the Matron – Molly Mason has just left school but she soon finds herself a very responsible job as "mother" to fifty unruly lads at Burleigh School for Boys. Despite her slight build she manages the boys better than any of the teachers.
- Mona And The Mini-Folk – Mona Master, a magician, has been invited to a kingdom of Minivonia, where all the people are little. The King has promised that Mona's "magic" will make them tall.
- Mona's Moonstone – Mona Lockhart's father is an astronaut and he brings her back a stone that he got from the moon. Mona discovers the stone has unusual powers.
- Move over, Maria – Maria Campbell is the popular class captain until the arrival of Josie Goulden. Josie looks so angelic, but she is in fact a nasty, cheating, troublemaker. Josie pushes Maria out with a series of frame-ups. Maria must expose Josie before Josie's tricks get her expelled.
- Mum Knows Best – Jasmine Pearce's parents are ridiculously over-protective, in reaction to her twin sister dying of a rare disease as a baby.
- My Best Friend's Ex: Lynne wants to go out with Mike, who recently split up with her best friend Donna. Donna assures Lynne that she does not mind her going out with her ex. Secretly, though, Donna does mind, and she is trying to destroy the relationship.
- My Brother's a Pop Star – Stella Jones is manager to her pop star brother.
- My School Chum Mum – Before he goes on an Antarctic trip, Rachel Todd's father invents an anti-ageing cream. But the cream works too well – when Mum tries it, she reverts to looking like a schoolgirl. She is forced to pass herself off as Rachel's cousin Emily and attend Rachel's school – and struggles there because school has changed a lot since her day. Things get even more difficult when social welfare start interfering as they think there is no adult in charge.
- My Sister Mitzy – The adventures of a girl and her troublesome little sister.
- Myra Gold, Budding Ballerina – Eleven-year-old Myra Gold is the secret owner of the Paladin Junior Ballet School and is enjoying her lessons there. Any time Myra needs help her problems are always solved, and she hears a mysterious voice, which she believes is her dead mother's.
- Mystery at Mirov: Nadia Fabrie is the daughter of world-famous ballerina Anna Rulinska, who had abandoned her as a baby and then died in a crash. After the death of Nadia's father, a mysterious benefactor gives Nadia the money to buy Mirov Ballet School. But the school is rundown and needs repairs, and Nadia is trying to come up with a way to save it.
- Nellie Nightingale – Nellie Nightingale is a poor orphan who singa for pennies on street corners. She falls into the clutches of Ma Bigsen, who makes her believe she had killed someone in order to use her as a decoy for the evil woman's gang of pickpockets. But then Nellie is spotted by Lady Millway, who sees great potential in Nellie's voice.
- Netta Know-All – Christine Mason's cousin Netta is sent to study in Factory Street School with her. Netta had been the top pupil at her school and does not give anyone a good reason to like her at her new school.
- New Girl: Carrie is afraid that new girl Lisa is trying to take her best friend Sue away from her.
- No Collar For Scrap – A story told from the point of view of a dog Scrap, who does not want a domestic life. There are no speech or thought bubbles, instead a paragraph of text is underneath each picture.
- No Horse For Netta – Netta's family cannot afford to buy her a horse, so Netta works for a mean horse dealer, Mr Mundy, who allows her to ride any unsound horses.
- No Music for Mandy – Mandy Rogers wins a place at the famous Lambert School of Ballet. But when she arrives at the school, she discovers that she is going deaf. She decides to keep this secret as she is afraid that she will have to leave the school if anyone found out.
- No Place Like Home – For as long as she can remember, Josie Small has been fostered by Mum Keegan. She knows nothing about her real parents, but now she is given a chance to have a home of her own when Mr and Mrs Farmer adopt her. She finds that life with the Farmers' lovely home is very different to being part of the Keegans' noisy household.
- No Place to Dance! – Kate Miller and her best friend Suzy Durham, start a Disco Dancing Formation Team at the exclusive St. Mead's High School for Girls. It is difficult for them to practice, however, as dancing is not allowed at the school.
- No Tennis for Tessa – Tessa Lyons, once the wonder-girl of tennis, is now reliant on a wheelchair, living with the family she once ignored. Her father refuses to have any mention of tennis in his house, but Tessa sees that her younger sister Alice has the potential to become a tennis player.
- No Time for Terri! – Terri Dempster is excited when her parents return from working abroad, and looks forward to leaving boarding school and spending as much time as possible with them. So it is a shock to find her parents have taken on Heartvale House and turned it into a children's home, where they are so busy looking after their charges they have no time for their own daughter.
- No-One Cares for Cara – During the eighteenth century, times are hard for Cora Thatcher's parents and they are forced to sell their fine horse, Starlight. Charles Beaufort, a wealthy landowner, buys the horse for his spoilt daughter, Clarissa. Because no-one can handle the horse except Cora, she is "bought" too. Although the valuable horse is well fed and tended, life is grim for Cora.
- Nobody's Darling – Liz Reynolds is put into the care of Mrs Langridge, a kindly old woman, after the arrest of her father. Young Liz is too independent to appreciate her new guardian's love and kindness.
- Nonie's Knight – Nonie Byrne has many problems when a medieval knight she disturbed from his slumbers sets himself up as her protector.
- Noreen From Nowhere – Noreen O'Donald leaves Ireland to try to trace her past in England. She is taken in and given a job by the Barkers, but does not realize that they are her relatives who have just inherited her father's estate. They intend to keep the truth from her so they can keep the inheritance themselves.
- Oh, Mr Blossom! – The arrival of a new, young science teacher, Mr Blossom, threatens to wreck the friendship between Jean Beale and Sally Crofton. Both girls are eager to impress him.
- The Old Curiosity Shop - An adaptation of the Charles Dickens book.
- Once Upon a Time... – Karen Morgan and Lynne Parsons are best friends and so are their mums. Then their mothers fall out over a book Mrs Morgan had written and they order their daughters to keep away from each other. But the girls are determined to continue their friendship.
- One Shall Be Queen – Podge and her twin sister Janet are brought from England, to the Island of Lamona, in the South Seas, where one of them will be crowned Queen of the Island. Podge is convinced their mother who was lost at seas years ago is alive and on the island.
- One-Hit Wonders!: In their youth, Sally King's parents were part of a one-hit pop group, Chess and the Checkers. Now they are re-forming the group, but Sally is finding this way too embarrassing.
- Oriel – an alien who poses as a schoolgirl in order to learn more about human behaviour. Her goal is to help pave the way for an alien invasion, but she ends up becoming more human than she anticipated.
- Orphan Of The Circus – An orphan girl is manipulated by an unscrupulous circus owner.
- Out of Step! Julie Walker's dream is that her divorced parents would get together again. But her dad becomes engaged to Grace Harvey, whose daughter Karen is at school with Julie. The two girls cannot stand each other, which makes Julie determined to break up the engagement.
- Outcast Of The Class – Jane Scott arrives to teach at Kamatahl, but is shocked to find out only rich children are allowed to attend school. When Jane meets a poor girl, Aimee, who longs to go to school, she tries to help her.
- Outcast of the Pony School – Laura Clark has been granted a free place at High Hurdles, an exclusive girls' boarding school that specialises in riding. But the snobby girls are outraged and start playing tricks on Laura.
- Pam's Army – Pam Taylor gives up her career in the Army, to try to put St Georgina's School back on its feet. Evicted from its premises, the school is now being run in a disused Army Camp.
- Pam the Pearler - Pam Quentin's father is seriously injured by a shark when—pearl hunting, so Pam takes over the running of his schooner “Black Pearl.” Unknown to the pearlers, someone else wants sole possession of the rich oyster beds, using sharks to help him.
- Parachute Nurse – The story follows a nursing assistant that is also an expert parachutist.
- Parker Versus Parker -Carol Parker's ambition is to be a gymnast, but her talent does not please her sister Elaine, who is also training to be a gymnast. Carol's mother, an ex-ballerina, is also upset as she wants Carol to follow in her footsteps.
- Pat the Brat – Pat Barnet is a good tennis player but does not have the killer instinct – she plays for fun not to win. Then her father gets in some serious trouble when he borrows money from a charity fund he is treasurer of to help out his own business, planning to pay it back later. An audit is coming up in 4 months and if he does not replace the money by then, he is sure to go to jail. Pat decides she must start winning cash prizes at tennis and show no mercy to other players. She starts acting nasty in general, so not to give away the reason why she is suddenly so keen to win.
- Patsy's Parents – Patsy has just been adopted. Her parents are nice, but seem a bit old-fashioned and dull. Patsy is trying to change them.
- Paula's Pen Pal: Paula Shelton sends her German pen pal Joachim photographs of herself and her best friend Sara. But when Joachim replies, Paula realises he thinks Sara is her. She decides not to tell him the truth in case he does not write again. But then Joachim says he is coming to meet Paula in person on a school trip. When Sara hears about the problem, she agrees to swap identities with Paula while Joachim visits.
- Peg Of The Peaks – Peg Duncan, an orphan, was determined to turn her dog, Shep into a champion sheepdog.
- Penny Brown Club Leader – Penny Brown and her friend Cathy Adams set up a youth club in their quiet village, Stoneheads.
- Penny Grant Of The Pets Hotel -Penny Grant lives at Marley Manor, an old country house, and has to care for her widowed father and the houses upkeep. Her friend Jane Ellison comes up with the idea of working together, using the Grants grounds and outhouses to look after people's pets while they are away. Caring for the variety of pets gives Penny an interest as well as an income and Jane is able to indulge in her love of animals.
- Penny's Puppets: Orphan Penny Fairchild lives with her stern, cold grandmother at the Fairchilds' ancestral home, Middleton Manor. She feels out of place at school, but finds solace in her teacher Miss Jackson. Penny finds further solace in the puppets she finds in the attic, but grandmother has forbidden her to go to the attic. Then Miss Jackson tells Penny about a family feud involving the puppets, which are linked to Roland, the world's greatest puppeteer and ventriloquist, and a singer called Rose Rossay. They start to investigate the mystery together.
- Pert Gert - A humor strip featuring the titular Gert.
- Petra's Pen Pal: Petra has been Rosa's pen pal until she comes back from abroad. She and Rosa form a threesome with Rosa's other friend, Dee. Then someone starts playing tricks on Rosa and it seems to point to Petra.
- Petra's Protectors – Early in the Second World War, Petra, a gypsy girl, has a circus act in France with her performing dogs, Leo, Pip and Tiki. When the Germans overrun France the circus is destroyed, and Petra and her dogs become refugees.
- Phantom Friend – Jill Meadows has only made one friend at her new boarding school but she is a ghost named Amy.
- Pimpernal, the Horse With a Future - Text story about Jill Morris and her horse Pimpernal.
- Ping Pong Patsy : Patsy Hanley is crazy about table tennis and is determined to become a champion.
- Pinkie – Mary Wilmer's sister Babs gains the power to shrink – at unpredictable moments – after an accident in Dad's laboratory. Mary dubs her "Pinkie" as when she shrinks she is no bigger than Mary's little finger.
- Plain Jane – Jane Grant has always known her mother favoured her younger sister Elizabeth, but when her father dies, she discovers that she is adopted and her mother no longer feels she has a responsibility for her. The sisters are sent to school, Elizabeth is to be educated, but Jane is to be a servant.
- Please, Mum! – Shirin Putan recently moved to England with her mother and elder sister, Karima. Her sister quickly adapts into the English culture which drives her and the mother apart. Shirin is left stuck in the middle, and she wants to honour her mother's rules and traditions, but she also wants to be able to fit in at school.
- Pocahontas – Red Indian Princess – The story of the famous Native American.
- Polly and the Princess - In the late 1500s, Polly Green, daughter of a charcoal-burner, has an encounter with a young rich girl “Bess”. She is shocked to later find out that “Bess” was actually King Henry VIII’s daughter, the princess Elizabeth. Elizabeth invites Polly to Hampton Court as her friend.
- Polly Pimpernel - In 1792 at the time of the French Revolution, young Polly Perkin aids her uncle Sir Roger Blackie, known as the Purple Pimpernel, in rescuing aristocrats from losing their heads.
- Pop Starr – a girl is leading a double life to keep her snobby classmates from finding out her father was a pop star.
- Powder Potts – Polly Potts works in the cosmetics department at Heston's department store with her friend Ann Hill. Polly is ambitious and longs to do well at her job, but she is so shy she lets other people walk all over her. She has a sudden boost of confidence when a new mix of powder accidentally spills on her.
- Powerhouse Patsy – Sixteen-year-old Patsy Hanley is a mill worker in Blackshire and also a powerful table tennis player. She is keen to make it to the top, but playing means a lot of travelling and practice.
- Princess Of Sorrow – After Suki's British mother dies her father, the Sultan of Salaka, turns into a tyrant. Table tennis being the country's major sport, the Sultan sends Suki on a course of ruthless training to make her a champion.
- Princess of the Pops – Princess Helen of Lichenberg loves pop music, but her father, King Gustave, has forbidden her to listen to it. Now Helen has gone even further – living a double life as a masked pop star, "M'Lady of Mystery"! But a double life is very tricky, especially when you have both royal and popstar duties.
- Princess of the Sun: The perfectly preserved body of Nusta Calixapas, daughter of the last of the Inca kings, comes to life when it is discovered during an archaeological expedition. Nusta refuses to be separated from Melanie Mace, an archaeologist's daughter, whom she makes her personal maid. So Nusta comes to England and Melanie's boarding school, but her haughtiness as a royal is not making her popular. She also starts developing strange fainting fits, but recovers in the sunlight.
- Princess Pain-In-The-Neck – When Princess Veraskaya becomes a pupil at Ashfield High School, she chums up with Elsie Small. But being a Princess's friend is not easy, as Elsie finds out when Vera begins imitating the antics of her grandmother, a pupil at Ashfield years before.
- Princess Penny – Penny Golden wins a competition to become the Summer Princess in the seaside resort, Bridsea where she lives. But it seems she has a secret enemy that is trying to sabotage things for Penny.
- Princess Wildcat – Princess Jenna of Tarbia was thought to have been killed in an air crash as a baby – however she is found alive 12 years later living with animals in the jungle. Her grandfather King Karl hires a governess in the hopes of taming her.
- Prisoners of the Rainbow – By a strange quirk of fate, Raine Franklin and her little sister Wendy stumble through the Spectrum Door which leads them to an invisible universe on the other side of the rainbow. But the door has vanished and time is travelling backwards at incredible speed, so they must find their way home.
- Punch and Jenny – The adventures of Jenny and her horse Punch.
- Puppy Love: Lauren Dean has always wanted a pet, but it was not possible as her family live in an apartment block. Then Dad changes jobs and the family move into a cottage, where Lauren can have a pet at last. A stray dog adopts Lauren, and Lauren names her Spot. Spot dies, but not before she has given birth to three puppies, who become Lauren's new pets.
- Quackers: Maisie Moss has a pet duck called Quackers, who is a real character. His personality soon has him in demand for advertisements.
- Queen For A Month – The timid Princess Zonia is to become Queen of Mervania in a month. Her guardian, Duchess Tania, knows Zonia lacks the confidence to fulfil the strenuous programme which lay ahead of the coronation, but gets an idea when she meets Shirley Fitzpatrick, an English circus girl with a sparkling personality and an exact double for Zonia. She asks Shirley to stand in for the princess until the coronation.
- Queen of the Gypsies – Shirley Groves runs away from her aunt and uncle and becomes queen of gypsy clan. One girl, Lola, does not like Shirley, as she thinks that she should be queen, and wants to see Shirley dethroned.
- Queenie Of The Castle – Queenie Smith becomes owner of a village and castle when she finds a hidden will by Lord Tingley, that states whoever finds the will becomes his heir.
- Ragamuffin Queen – Nina, a twelve-year-old urchin who spent her time poaching in the royal forest of Marvonia, is now the most important person in the kingdom. The young child-queen, Marion, who is the image of Nina, has been abducted and in order to prevent a revolution, the Prime Minister asks Nina to take the queen's place and undergo a thorough grooming. Though reluctant, Nina agrees to help her country.
- Raggy Hannah – Hannah Hamer's father is the village clogmaker and reckons her younger brother Robin should learn the craft from him. However, Hannah felt Robin should have a better start in life, so she takes on a dreadful job at the local paper mill, while he goes to study at The College on the Hill.
- Reluctant Rebel – Timid Beth Carson is confused for her rebellious cousin Beverly at her new school. Beth enjoys her new found notoriety but knows she knows she must tell the truth before things get out of hand.
- Remember Me, Rosie: Sam Martyn and Rosie Grant are best friends until Rosie moves away. A few months later Sam's family move to the same town as Rosie, but Rosie is now snobbish and does not want to have anything to do with Sam. Sam takes revenge by causing constant trouble for Rosie.
- Rena's Reign of Tears -Rena Reilly discovers that a curse had been laid upon her – that she would one day become a queen but would have a reign of tears. Rena believes she will never be a queen, but then she wins a contest to be Teen Queen for a year.
- Ring for Rita: Rita Rawlings runs a one-girl Escort Agency and takes on any request, however unusual. And unusual is the word.
- Ring of Truth – Catriona Smythe is spoiled and selfish. Gran promises her a diamond ring for her sixteenth birthday, but Catriona is not willing to wait until then, so she just takes it. But then a series of disasters follow, and each disaster seems to be accompanied by a diamond disappearing from the ring. Catriona becomes convinced some sort of supernatural power is at work to punish her for her crime.
- Rita's Robots – In the year 2003, Rita Knox's father has been given the task of choosing a prototype home-robot, which is to be launched on the mass market. Rita persuades him to try out F.E. and K.C. in their own home, but the two robots become instant enemies.
- Rivals for Robbie: Clare and Emma are best friends who both fancy Robbie Jenkins. They do not want to fall out over him, so they try to be friendly rivals.
- Robina Hood – Robina Hood, granddaughter of the famous Robin Hood, and her "Merry Maids" Winnie Scarlet, Flo Tuck and Little Jane, follow in their elders footsteps to stop injustice in Nottingham.
- Robyn's Return: Robyn Turner had been a popular and successful girl at Woodcraft School until she moves away and then moves back after her father gets a transfer that does not work out. During her absence there have been too many changes. Robyn now feels left out of things and is becoming unpopular as the girls keep accusing her of trying to take over.
- Rock School - Paula, Mel, Rachel and twins, Jo and Jane form an all-girl rock group called ‘Simply Pink’.
- Rosie's Return: A girl goes back to her old house in Kinley and ends up wishing she had not. She had a quarrel with her friend Carol before she moved, and when she meets Carol again, she is freaked out by Carol having a ghostly encounter with a girl named Rosie.
- Run, Mum – Run! – Joy Brownlee is worried about her parents. Her mum is an overweight, stay-at home mother, while her father is a sports fanatic who joked about his "middle-aged" wife. When Joy's friend's parents split up, Joy decides to get her mother interested in sport.
- Run, Rana, Run!: Rana Mogambu is a brilliant athlete from Bokana. She is sent to be educated at Lingon Girls' School. Shari, an elder from Rana's village, accompanies her to monitor her athletics training. He also has strange powers, which he uses to help Rana win races.
- Runner Beane – Lucy Beane, who lives alone in her caravan, is a promising young athlete who worksas a gardener for Lady Bardsley.
- Rusty: In the early days of pop music, Rusty Larkin is discovered. However, although Rusty has the voice, she does not have the looks to become a pop star. So Rusty's friend Cherry Moore mimes while Rusty sings backstage. But two toughs, Al and Syd, are causing trouble.
- Sadie's Sewing Machine: In 1870s Colorado, Sadie Heritage, her father and her brother Rolf's family arrive in the boom town of Kowawa Springs. The men of the family find it difficult to get work, but Sadie is making ends meet with her sewing machine. The men eventually find good jobs, but Rolf's family are still hanging on and expect Sadie to slave for them all the time.
- Sail On Sal! – Sal was born on a tiny island off the coast of Cornwall, and owns the only ferry that keeps the island connected to the mainland. If the ferry stops running the island becomes the property of rich Silas Martin. Sal is determined not to let this happen.
- Sal And Her Singing Schoolgirls – Sal Morris, a young teacher at Hindley House Girls' School, is put in charge of the worst behaved class in the school and gains their approval by forming a folk-singing group the "Singing Hinnies".
- Sal in the Sun – Sally Peters is the children's rep for a small holiday company at a Spanish hotel. She has to deal with rivalry from their rich neighbours, Timson's Holidays.
- Sal The Swan Girl – Sal Lewis lives off Renzil beach, where there is a lot of bird activity. Her father, Fred, runs the nearby Swannery.
- Sally And Her Seal – Sally Wilson is the proud owner of Pootsie, a tame but cute seal.
- Sally at Sylvano's: Sally Shaw leaves school and starts work at Sylvano's department store. She wants to be a window dresser, but Miss Newman, the head window dresser, is being deliberately hard on her to test her resolve while the other assistants are snobby and then jealous. Sally finds solace in a wonderful secret – using the basement to practise her own window-dressing.
- Sally on Planet Serbos – Sally Martin, a local "Space Invaders" champion on Earth, is transported to the planet Serbos, to help clear up some of the troublemakers who have descended on the planet since uranium was discovered there.
- Sally-on-the-Spot – Sally Jones likes to know what is going on. Her curiosity often lands her right on the spot where interesting events happen.
- Sandie's Secret – Cassandra Jones, known as Sandie, is going out with Michael Parker. Michael's sister, Helen, is at the same school as Sandie, but the two girls hate each other, so Sandie does not want her to know the identity of her boyfriend.
- Sandie's Sweets: Sandie Jenkins buys a packet of Sweet Dreams, which are sweets with mottoes on them. Whenever Sandie eats a Sweet Dream, the motto on it seems to come true. Sandie starts getting selfish over the apparent power of the sweets, especially after the Sweet Dreams are withdrawn and she has to make do with the packet she has.
- Sandra Deane - Sandra Deane starts as an apprentice hairdresser and soon becomes an assistant, then a hair stylist in her own right and opens up her own hair salon.
- Sandra's Sad Secret a.k.a. Cheat! – When Sandra Harrison's father is imprisoned for fraud, she and her mother move in with her strict grandparents in Wales. Sandra has promised to keep her father's whereabouts secret, but a girl at school Megan had found out the truth and is now blackmailing Sandra.
- Sandra's Search – When her archaeologist father falls ill, Sandra Small decides to take his place on an expedition into the South American jungle to find the fabulous stone of Solomon, a tablet as ancient as time itself.
- Sarah and Jane, Little Ladies at War – Two girls play loving sisters in a TV period drama, but off-camera they cannot stand each other.
- Sarah's Secret: Sarah Smith gets her first date with a boy called William. Too late she discovers that he is Billy Benson, who is a bitter rival of her brother Andrew, and she starts dating Billy in secret.
- Sarah's Sounds – Sarah Barker works for the local radio station in charge of recording unusual sound effects.
- Scapegoat of the School – An important treaty is to be signed with the country of Centralina. However, in order for the treaty to be signed, the princess Rosetta must attend a British school, and must be happy at all times. In order to avoid trouble, the school makes Sally Smith, a scholarship girl, look after Rosetta and take any punishments she earns- but Rosetta earns a LOT of punishments because of her bossiness!
- Scared!: When Caz frightens off a burglar, everyone thinks she is really brave. But the incident has traumatised Caz. She is becoming a bag of nerves and is too ashamed to tell anyone.
- Scatty Matty, The School's Last Hope – Matilda "Matty" Trott is tricked by her schoolmates into entering a contest to find the Rippley Rosebud. All entrants are to be given tests not just of beauty, but of initiative, and the winner will accompany the reigning beauty queen the Rose of Rippley during the forthcoming carnival.
- School of Shadows: The pupils of Ratcliffe Park Boarding School are temporarily relocated to Ratcliffe Manor when their school needs repairs because of structural damage from flooding. There are rumors that the manor is haunted. Then the headmistress, Mrs Jonson, starts acting very strangely. At times she acts normally, but at other times she turns into a dragon, treating everyone in a manner that is not only extremely harsh but also Victorian in its thinking.
- School's Out! – Follows the lives, families, romances and friendships of a group of students including Patti Wheeler, Ellie Lane, Deepa Shastri, and Gladys Bates.
- Second Best Babs – Babs and Betty Cartwright are identical twins who are seldom apart, until Babs fails an exam and is sent to a different school to her sister. From that day on Betty receives all her parents' attention while Babs is often neglected and frequently in trouble.
- Secret Boyfriend – Lisa Adam's older, attractive sister, Karen is always stealing her boyfriends. So when she starts dating Simon Dixon, she decides to keep him a secret.
- Secret Gymnast – Ginny Jones enjoys sports, but she has yet to find the one that fits her best. After a hockey match she gets into a fight with some girls from the competing school. She escapes them by running away through a building site. Unknown to her, while she is maneuvering around the site, she is being watched. The older woman sees potential in her and invites her into her house. She tells Ginny she has been looking for a promising student for quite a while and wants to train her to be a gymnast. Ginny agrees to be trained despite some oddness from her new coach, like wanting to keep the lessons secret.
- Secret Love: Jenny Parker and Beth McPherson are best friends. Beth is always complaining about her brother Ben. So when Jenny falls for Ben, she keeps it a secret from Beth.
- Secret Of The Sick Bay – Betty and Eva investigate mysterious events at their boarding school.
- Secret School – In Victorian times Hannah Gilbert finds her class at the exclusive Howard Academy disappointing because the spoiled brats just don't want to learn. Then Hannah discovers that poor children make more willing pupils and is running a secret school for them.
- Selma's Sanctuary – Selma Jenks' father is in hospital, and Uncle Tristan takes over the running of his farm. His focus on profit-making threatens Selma's animal sanctuary, so she turns to animal training to make a profit out of her sanctuary too. But this annoys her rival, Miss Lavinia Leech.
- Sharing with Sharon - Sue Perry and Sharon Dixon have been friends for years, so are excited when Sharon's parents have to go away for few months and Sharon will stay at Sue's house. But it turns out living together is not as easy as they thought it would be.
- Sharing with Sonia: Kelly Warner is staying with her Aunt Sarah while her parents are abroad, and cousin Sonia is staying too because her mother is ill. But Kelly does not want to share with Sonia and is trying to harry her into leaving with a series of nasty tricks while pretending to be friendly. Kelly is soon making Sonia's life thoroughly miserable, what with having Sonia thinking she has an enemy at school and the other girls turning against her because they think she is trouble. But then the tables turn when someone starts playing similar tricks on Kelly.
- Sharon's Stone – When a woman is wrongly accused of witchcraft she sets a curse, inscribed on a stone, which will not be lifted until the accuser recants and their respective families make peace. Centuries later, the curse is set in motion once more when the stone resurfaces and sets the descendants feuding.
- Shivery Shirley: When Kelly Bond's mother opens a school at Charity Hall, Kelly discovers it is haunted by Shivery Shirley, a kitchen maid who died of the cold in prison after being wrongly accused of theft. Everywhere Shirley goes, cold and icy blasts follow her, hence her nickname.
- Show Off!: When Shirley's cousin Chloe comes to stay, Shirley finds her to be a real show off. She is even more annoyed to find her friends more interested in her show-off cousin than her.
- Simple Simone – During the Second World War, Simone, an orphan, arrives in a French village. Because of her innocent, trusting nature, Simone soon becomes accepted in the village, although many resent her friendliness with the invading Germans. But Simone is not as simple as she appears to be and is secretly working with the Resistance.
- Sister of the Bride – Shona and John are engaged to be married. Shona's sister Jane keeps sabotaging her modelling career in order to ensure Shona gets married, which she believes is what will make Shona truly happy.
- Sister Sal What a Gal: Millicent Wingrove attends an exclusive school, St Anne's. Her father remarries and her new stepsister Sally joins her at the school. Unfortunately Sally has not been taught manners, especially table manners, and at an exclusive school this makes for problems.
- Slaves Of The Ballet – The Sultan Zodu of Dhanabu kidnaps the pupils of a British ballet dancing school for his spoilt daughter Almira.
- Snowball - Jeanne Laurent, known as “Snowball”, is a mountaineer, who is determined to climb Mount Everest.
- Soldier Sally: In 1940, Selina Howard (who goes by nickname Sally), joins the A.T.S. (Auxiliary Territorial Service) to help with the war effort. She does not make a good first impression on Sergeant Rathbone, but proves her worth. Later gained a sequel named Lance-Corporal Sally.
- Sonia And The Sacred Cat – Sonia is an outcast in the desert and her only friend is a cat. The followers of Mahmoud believe the cat is a sacred cat of Ancient Egypt. He makes Sonia his slave to look after the cat and claims the cat will lead him to victory in a war of conquest.
- Sonia's Secret: Sonia Grenville's father is wrongly struck off the medical register. When Sonia starts at a new school she confides in Rachel Andrews, thinking she can trust her. Too late, Sonia finds out her trust is misplaced – Rachel is a gossip and troublemaker who starts blackmailing Sonia into being her 'friend'. This makes Sonia unpopular with her classmates.
- Sosana the Gipsy Show Jumper – Sosana Riply thinks that she and her pony Magpie have a good chance of becoming show jumpers.
- Spinning Jenny - Jenny Pearce, a girl juggler from Liverpool, travels to New York looking for stage work. She registers with a little-known theatrical agent, Sam Bartok, and he tries to find jobs for her—but neither of them realize that H. K. Zigfell, the most famous showman in America, is searching for Jenny to give her a part in his new show.
- Star Pets – Animal lover Sally Kemp starts up her own agency – to supply animals for use in television and film work.
- Starla's Spell: A new girl, Starla Cresswell, starts at Sarah Campbell's school, and Sarah realises there is something strange about her, such as having hypnotic powers over people. Eventually she discovers that Starla is an alien from the planet Mornekia and the Morneks are out to invade Earth.
- Starring Sally – Sally Smith wants to be a singer. But does she have the talent or is she just a dreamer?
- Steamboat Jo – Jo Wiley disguises herself as a boy and runs away from the Purdy Orphanage, in the deep south of America. She hopes to find her father, who is working on a Mississippi mail-boat called "Queen of the Levee".
- Stella and the Swinging Five: Stella Starr, a young guitar player, joins the newly formed girls' pop group, The Swinging Five and hopes to earn enough money to save her grandfather's rundown cafe. However, she senses something odd about the group's organiser, Madame Svengler, who is also a miser.
- Stella at Stage School: Stella May wins a scholarship to Madam Spencer's Stage School. But her father does not approve or understand Stella's acting and thinks it is detrimental to her education, which he drives her too hard at. He keeps threatening to withdraw Stella from the school if she fails her schoolwork.
- Stop, Thief!: Liz Ryan tells the story of what happened when there was a thief in the class, and she and her best friend Sally turned detective to find the culprit.
- Sue At The Wheel – Sue Horner works at her aunt's café, delivering home-made cakes to customers living in the country. Sue loves driving much more than cooking, although her aunt does not understand her attachment to her car "Jemima".
- Supergirl - No relation to the DC Comics character of the same name, this Supergirl is Susie Sullivan, a supposedly disabled schoolgirl given bionic legs (which enable her to jump fifty feet and run at 100 mph) and a bionic right eye (which can see in the dark and has a zoom lens) by the government so that she can work for them as a secret agent.
- Superlamb – Lenny the lamb gets injured and is rebuilt by vet scientists. Along with being super fast and strong, Lenny has heat powers and x-ray. He gets his owner Mary into trouble sometimes, but usually everything works out for the best in the end.
- Superstitious Cindy – A comic strip about a very superstitious girl.
- Susan of Sunnysides – Susan Anderson is an Assistant Housemother at Sunnyside's Children's home.
- Susie's Secret – Julie fancies Susie's brother. He already has a girlfriend, but Susie is trying to keep this a secret because she does not want to fall out with Julie.
- Switching Schools: Due to falling numbers, Brompton School merges with its rival, Hanson High. But the old enmity is dying hard and the Hanson High pupils are not being friendly to the former Brompton pupils.
- Taka- From The Back Of Beyond – Taka is a mysterious girl who was expelled from a strange lost tribe and now lives in a cave on Great Whernside that is guarded by an eagle. She has made friends with Linda and Arthur, members of the local canoe club.
- Takeaway Terry – Life is not easy for twelve-year-old Terry. Her Dad spends most of his time at the pub while her Mum is bingo mad, leaving Terry spending all her spare time doing housework and looking after her baby brother. Then her like of takeaway food brings a new complication – Mr Chung, the owner of the takeaway, discovers she had a talent for table tennis, and he wants to train her to championship level.
- Tanya From Tongo – Just after Tanya Taylor was born on the lovely island of Tongo, her parents are killed. But their native nanny brings the girl up as if she were her own child until she turns ten. Then Tanya goes to England to be educated.
- Teen TV – Heston Comp is making its own TV programmes.
- Teeny Tina: Tina Tate is a dare-devil who can never resist a challenge. But now she is facing one against her better judgement – Teeny, who is a tiny version of herself.
- Ten Against The Tryptons – Long Barrow School has been invaded by girls from the planet Trypton, and placed under a "Dome of Blackness" cutting it off from the outside world. Trypton will soon no longer support life, and the girls have been sent to test the intelligence on Earth. If the ten chosen Long Barrow pupils prove to be inferior to their Trypton counterparts, then the invaders from space will come to Earth as rulers.
- Tennis Trouble – Jenny Milton is furious when her mother remarries because she thinks her stepfather is not good enough. Jenny's mum encourages Jenny and her stepbrother Tony Smith to play tennis as a doubles team to try to bring both families together.
- Tess of the Timberlands:Tess Wilson lives in a log cabin in the middle of the Oregan Forests of America. Her father is a forestry ranger, and she often helps him and the animals in the area.
- The Adventures of Ozz – Ozz, a small alien, comes to earth to search for his brother, who came to Earth to survey the planet but has not returned. On earth he crosses paths with Sheena Wallace, a young entertainer.
- The Baby-Snatchers – Joyce Marsh makes the dreadful discovery that her employers, the Herrings, are 'cribbers' – people who buy and sell stolen babies. The Herrings are also her family's landlords, and Joyce's father forbids her to go to the police in case they are thrown out into the streets. Joyce tries to reunite the babies with their parents without making the Herrings suspicious of her.
- The Battling Ballerina – Ballet teacher Belinda comes up against a gang of punks who are fighting her for the right to use the hall she rents for her classes. She decides the only way to save the ballet school is to teach her students judo for self-defense.
- The Bennetts of Ballet: Margot Bennett and her family run Bennetts' Travelling Ballet, a ballet company that tours the country and performs in places where ballet is rarely seen.
- The Best of Enemies – Carol Parker and Alice Redfern are totally different girls, but their mothers had been very close friends when they were young. When they find out their daughters are going to the same boarding school they assumed the girls will be close friends too. Unfortunately the girls cannot stand each other and when the Head tries to bring them together, it is like trying to mix oil and water!
- The Best of Friends – Sue Candy and Mandy Watt are best friends at Firs Lane Comp until Mandy's family move away. Sue pairs up with Carly – then Mandy's family return.
- The Blue Tulip – Wilhelmina Brouwer lives in Holland during World War II. Her father has been imprisoned by the Germans, leaving Willi in charge of the precious blue tulips he took years to develop.
- The Boy Ban: Stacey and Lynne are best friends. They decide to go without boys after they have boyfriend trouble. The ban proves difficult to enforce when Stacey falls for Damion.
- The Bubble Ballerinas – Jenna Jones and her friend Lyn Marshall are attending ballet class at the well known Demar School of Ballet, which is run by famous ballerina Madame Alice Demar – when the entire school is abducted by mysterious giant bubbles.
- The Change in Cheryl: Cheryl is being fostered by the Dysons. She is naturally shy and quiet, but then she stands up to a bully, winning admiration from her foster sister and friends. Cheryl then decides that the way to go in not being pushed around is to go all out to get anything she wants, regardless of anyone else.
- The Change in Claire – Jane Cook is happy when she finds out her friend Claire is moving back to the neighbourhood, but Claire seems to have changed in her time away and has it out for Jane's family, maliciously causing trouble for them. Claire especially has something against Jane's brother Mike, and the change has something to do with her own sister Sara.
- The Children's Champion – Dissatisfied with the Victorian lifestyle, Hester Langley renounces her wealthy life to help the poor of London.
- The City Under The Sea – Sally Walker is searching for her father, who disappeared while looking for an ancient city that had been swallowed by the sea.
- The Courage of Crippled Clara – Mary Jordan is the only friend of Clara Thornton, the disabled daughter of the village squire. Mary is trying to help Clara to walk again by offering her secret riding lessons, but when the squire finds out, he overreacts and turns the whole village against Mary.
- The Dancing Donnellys – Jane and Joe Donnelly have been brought up in a strictly-run sect, The Children of Carona. They have to get special dispensation from their sect to pursue ice-skating careers. Then disaster strikes when Joe's sight begins to fail, and the beliefs of their sect forbid him from seeking treatment. Their trainer, Myra Calvert, investigates the sect, and discovers it is being run by racketeers – who are now out to kill the Donnellys.
- The Daughter Of Buffalo Bill – Mary Cody and her closest friend, Benny Wood, join a wagon train heading West. Mary is a great help to Mrs Gall, an invalid widow with five children, but the rest of the settlers distrust Mary and Benny, because of their friendliness with the Apache Indians.
- The Demon Doll: Donna Edwards is given a dummy for her ventriloquist act. But it has been cursed by a witch doctor and causes trouble wherever it goes.
- The Dreams Of Dolwyn – Dolwyn Darke has a talent of being able to dream about the future. Her aunt Rachel and cousin Charlie want to use her talent to con rich people out of their money.
- The Emperor's Eagle – Young Emperor John of Maltavia has a giant black eagle which obeys his commands – only his sister, Iris, knows it is one of his own mechanical inventions. When ex-Prime Minister Zarkos plots to kill the royal pair and take over the country, they are saved by old Hanna of the woods. They hide in the woods and are joined by loyal people who want to help them.
- The Evil of Emily – Kate Williams is about to be adopted by Lord and Lady Lester when she is badly burned in a fire caused by nasty Emily West. When she recovers, she discovers that Emily is posing as her to be adopted in her place. Kate goes into the household as a scullery maid to expose Emily, but is impeded by the loss of her voice from the fire and being illiterate. She is overcoming the latter by learning to write, but Emily keeps sabotaging her efforts to prove her identity, and eventually gets her thrown into prison.
- The Faith and Hope of Charity Brown – In Britain in 1931, times are extremely hard for Charity. Her mother has died and her father has gambled away the family fortune.
- The Farleys Must Be First – Twin sisters Cathy and Lara Farley have been adopted by an exclusive club of international athletes. But sports and staff start causing divisions between the twins.
- The Fate of the Fairleys – In the early 1900s, after their mother dies, Angie and her younger siblings May and Jimmy, run away from an orphanage so they won't be separated.
- The Flights of Flopear – Tessa Worth finds a time-travel machine in the shape of a giant rabbit, named Flopear. When she presses a button she does not realise that she will be taken to the Planet Xargo, where Flopear was originally built as a birthday present for the mean tempered Princess Meana. Eventually she is able to get back to Earth, but continues to spend time travelling the universe with Flopear, as part of her job as Deputy to a Universal Dictator.
- The Flying Fosters – Nan and Sue Foster are sisters who perform stunt flying and parachute jumping.
- The Fortune Hunters – In the 1920s, Molly, a young girl from New York, is hired to accompany 15-year-old orphan Susan Latimer to meet her grandmother, Lady Windmarch, in Britain. But another Susan Latimer appeared, also claiming to be Lady Windmarch's granddaughter. Neither girl really cares for the old woman and actually cause her more distress with their squabbling and rivalry.
- The Ghost of Starr Stables: Zoe Starr and her parents move to a stables in the country. They bought it cheaply because it is run-down, but Zoe and her mother love their new life all the same. Then they are visited by a mysterious ghost horse.
- The Girl From Seal Island – Fern has lived all her life alone on Seal Island, where she learned the language of animals and plants. Fern has left her island and is being hunted like an animal, but she had also made two friends – Tom and his cousin Rachel.
- The Girl Of The Islands – A girl is raised by a tribal queen after she washes up on the island as a baby.
- The Girl With The Dancing Skates – Stella Dewar, daughter of the Earl of Sandsbury, leaves home to become a professional ice skater. Her father is opposed to her decision and uses his influence to try to get her to give up and come home, such as getting her fired.
- The Girl with the Sunshine Badge - Josephine “Jo” Wise, a cheery, athletic sixteen-year-old, is the youngest supervisor of Crest Leigh, a popular seaside holiday camp for girls. Being a supervisor needs lots of patience and sympathy, as well as occasional firmness, but Jo loves every minute of it.
- The Girl With The Yellow Shoes – Orphan Ann Grayson is determined to become a ballerina like her mother was. She carries with her her mother's yellow ballet shoes and earns her place at Tall Trees ballet school. Her guardian Aunt Rita wants to stop Ann's ambition, and refuses her money for her keep. so Ann ends up living in an abandoned caravan near the school.
- The Girls Of Sparrowgrass Creek – Jill and Jenny Carter live with their father in a small boatyard at Sparrowgrass Creek and help out in the local village.
- The Good Fairy (1965) – Grace James is the "Good Fairy" of an advertising project and has to decide whether or not to grant the wishes of children who write to her.
- The Good Fairy (1990) – The Good Fairy programme is the most popular show on Children's TV. Everyone loves happy, cuddly Aunt Jemima who acts as good fairy and made all the children's wishes come true. But it is really her assistant Lynn who does all the work and made the wishes come true, with the help of her colleague Lee.
- The Great Victoria – Jan and Paula discover a girl Victoria Bates preserved in ice, in a Victorian mansion. Victoria believes she is still in the 19th century and want the girls to help find her younger sister Meg.
- The Guilt Of Glendora – Glendora Gale is a rich, selfish and unkind girl but when she accidentally kills a girl during a quarrel she is sent away to a secluded boarding school. Miss Aiken, the harsh headmistress, sends the girls out to work as drudges.
- The Hiking Hendersons – Heather and Isobel Henderson run away from their cruel aunt Gladys and start hiking hundreds of miles to join their father in the Scottish Highlands.
- The Honourable Honoria – The Honourable Honoria Ingotsby joins Mersham Grammar School in order to turn their hockey team in to the best team with her wealth, rigorous training programme and herself as a star player.
- The Hooded Angel – In Victorian times, Henrietta Farnsworth becomes the "Hooded Angel" to secretly help the poor of London.
- The Impossible Pair – Tansy Tomkins and Marmaduke Ponsonby come from very different backgrounds, but they both want to be ice skating champions. Their trainer Rolf decides to team them up, but their mothers are constantly fighting.
- The Imposter! – Lady Harriet Mannering switches places with her maid Hetty for a day, but Hetty steals a valuable heirloom belonging to Harriet and claims to be her. Until Harriet can prove her identity, she has to endure a life of toil and grime below stairs.
- The In-Crowd: Samantha Hudson is shy and wants to be part of the in-crowd. So when she transfers to a new school, she makes up stories to impress her new school mates.
- The Incredible Adventures of Mini-Mum – Mrs. Spears accidentally drinks some reducing liquid, becoming Mini-Mum. Mr Spears, a scientist, works on a formula to bring his wife back to normal size. He also makes some special gadgets to help her out – but there are still dangers of being so small.
- The Invisible Schoolgirl: Ira Insley's scientist father is kidnapped. During the kidnap he throws a phial out the window and tells Ira to get rid of it at all costs. When the kidnappers make a grab for the phial, Ira swallows it and becomes invisible. Ira's friend Wendy does what she can to help hide her condition. But in the absence of Ira's father and the kidnappers coming after her, an antidote is not likely at the present time.
- The Kids Of Conway Street: Stories about different kids that live in Conway Street.
- The Kids of Grim Hall – In the year 1851, life is hard for the kids of Grimshaw Orphanage, know to them as Grim Hall. Alice Hawkins and three of her friends escape and head to London, hoping to tell Queen Victoria of their plight.
- The Kids of Grim Hall: In the year 1851, life was hard for the kids of Grimshaw Orphanage, know to them as Grim Hall. Alice Hawkins and three of her friends had escaped and gone to London, hoping to tell Queen Victoria of their plight.
- The Laird of Hee-Haw – Roderick MacCoe of Coe, Chief of Clan Coe and Laird of High Hall, known in Scotland as Hee-Haw, is completely penniless. His daughter, Shona, acts as the Laird's housekeeper, cook and maid-of-all things!
- The Land of Nowhere – When Nancy Wilson waters her sunflowers with a special growing powder, they just grow and grow. Nancy climbs the sunflowers to look for her cat Prudence and finds herself in The Land of Nowhere, a magic wonderland. In the Land of Nowhere, Nancy gains magical powers, but gets herself into trouble each time she uses them.
- The Last Girl in Hamelin: In the wake of the Pied Piper, Carla is the last girl left in Hamelin because she had been in jail on a false charge when the Pied Piper took the children away in revenge for the mayor refusing to pay him for eradicating the rats. The parents get jealous at Carla being spared while they lost their own children and Carla finds herself persecuted.
- The Last of the Everitts – Jill Marsh is secretly Geraldine Everitt, heiress to Oaklands. She works there as a kitchen-maid, in order to help her grandfather, Sir John, against Burrows, his scheming agent who almost ruined him.
- The Legend of Lucille – During the French Revolution, Lucille Lamont became a legend for guiding people to safety. In World War II, Lucy Vincent pretends to be the ghost of Lucille to aid the French Resistance movement. But then the real ghost appears!
- The Little Shrimp – Tina "Tiny" Beckett is small for her age and blind, but she would like to prove to her parents that she is not helpless and achieve her ambition of becoming a star swimmer. While her parents are away she stays with her gran, who helps to train her as a swimmer, despite not being able to swim herself.
- The Lonely Life of Linda Brown: Linda Brown is an orphan and her grandmother is too busy to give her much attention. The only person who does is a governess, Pat Roberts. But Pat leaves to get married and gran sends Linda to Brandon College for Girls, a boarding school.
- The Loner: Denise Fraser strikes up a friendship with Sylvie, a girl who travels on the same bus as herself to school. Then odd, suspicious things begin to happen; everyone who is nasty to Denise ends up in trouble of some sort. Denise begins to have doubts about Sylvie.
- The Lost Summer -Alison and Kit Lawson are spending the summer holidays with Aunt Vera. They befriend a strange girl called Emma. They realise Emma is a ghost and set about unraveling the mystery about her.
- The Maze: On a school trip to a ruined Victorian mansion, Susie Waters wanders into a maze. When she comes out, she finds herself in Victorian times, when the mansion was a school run by the cruel Miss Grimstaff. Susie needs the key to the maze to get back, but Miss Grimstaff has it. So Susie is forced to stay at the school, where she starts as one of the abused pupils and is then promoted to substitute teacher (but is still ill-treated) until she can get the key. In the meantime, Susie does what she can to help the abused pupils.
- The Mini Morgans – The Mini Morgans are Little People, that perform as a circus act in 1885, along with their friend Martha Little. Unfortunately the circus has to close and while the owner thinks he can get Martha another job, for the Morgans he says the only option is to join a freak show. The Morgans are not happy with being considered freaks and Martha decides she will help find them jobs. Along the way to find new jobs they have to deal with people's prejudices as well as DeVere the owner of the Freak show trying to capture them.
- The Mysterious Miss "X" – Nancy Dallas is forbidden to swim by her father so she enters competitions as Miss X.
- The Newcomers – Eta and her brother Elvin are aliens from the planet Topaz-9 who crash-land on Earth. Rescue will take time, so they are advised to keep their identities secret and integrate into Earth society as best they can. But this is not proving easy.
- The Night Owls – Sophie Gray and her brother, Jack, are able to leave the orphanage they stay in when they inherit a cottage when their Great-Uncle Lionel had left them. They find a secret passageway in the cottage that leads to Black Scar mine, and help the poor boys who slave in the mine for the sinister Silas Morgan.
- The No-Good Gnome – When Joanne Dolland and her parents move to the country, Joanne finds an ancient metal button which summons a gnome into her presence. The gnome can grant wishes – but not always in the way Joanne wanted.
- The Outcast (1989) - When her father dies bankrupt, thirteen year old Anna Curtis is made to work as a kitchen maid in the school she had previously been head girl, in order to pay off her school fees.
- The Outcast (1990) - Fern Patterson moves from the country into town, but things aren't going too well. The school bully, Penny, keeps picking on her, and Fern is finding it difficult to fit in.
- The Outcast of the Class (1960) - Due to her father's disappearance, Rhona Lamont and her mother are forced to move to a poor neighbourhood, while Rhona, an ex-public school girl, attends Hill Street Council School. The girls there are most unfriendly, and to make things worse, a man named Sam Runcorn arrives with an I.O.U. signed by Rhona's father, and threatens to reveal Mr Lamont's hiding place unless the debt is paid.
- The Painting – Life had been tough for the Blakes since Mr Blake lost his job. They get a new start though, when Mr Blake inherits a cottage from his aunt. While clearing out some things, Emma Blake has a rummage around the attic and comes across a portrait of a lady who bears an uncanny resemblance to herself. Soon, Emma is haunted by dreams where the girl from the painting tells her "we are one" and influences her into evil.
- The Perfect Friend? – Carly Walker is thrilled when older, trendy Michelle Sergeant wants to be her friend. But being friends with Michelle keeps causing problems for Carly.
- The Phantom Ballerina – A mysterious girl arrives at Madame Petrova's ballet school, but she cannot dance.
- The Pink Piano – Dan McCabe's family are travelling across America to start a new life in Texas. Along the way they make friends with two cowboys, not knowing they are actually bank-robbers. They hide the stolen money in Jill McCabe's piano, and plan to pick up the money again when the family reach the next town.
- The Price of Success - Geraldine Price is thrilled when her parents start up a successful fashion business selling teenage clothes. But, although Geraldine gains a lot from her new life, she finds there's a price to be paid too - her parents busy life is causing arguments between them.
- The Queen Who Wasn't (1980) – In the Kingdom of Gretenberg, Ella lives with her father who owns a wax museum. The Queen has to have an operation, so her staff employ Ella's father to make a wax mechanical model of the queen with voice recordings to temporarily replace her. Unfortunately this mechanical wax model of the queen has the brain box of a child, which causes mishaps, so Ella must try to keep control of the Queen and explain away some of her childlike tendencies, such as sliding down banisters. Meanwhile, the evil General Maximilian tries to get rid of the Queen so that he might rule Gretenberg.
- The Queen Who Wasn't! (1978) – During an uprising in Lutzenstein, the baby princess Wilhelmina is hidden with a foster family. Years later, when peace is restored, the foster mother presents her own daughter Mimi as the princess, as the real princess died during a plague.
- The Redwell Ring: The Redwell ring has the power to bring its respective owner the luck he or she deserves. It goes on a voyage through time, passing from owner to owner – or thief – and bringing the luck they deserve.
- The Rockhaven Rescuers – A former pupil of Rockhaven Village School has left money to keep the school from being closed on the condition that the pupils form a local sea and mountain rescue team. Senior girls Kathy Davies and Gwen Jones are appointed as team leaders.
- The Sailor Doll – Jackie is going on a school cruise with her friends Donna and Fran. Jackie's father gets her a sailor doll named Sam from a junk shop. When they are sailing off Jackie nearly drops Sam into the water. More strange things happen when the girls keep finding their porthole window open and Sam beside it, and Jackie has a nightmare in which she is drowning she also see a young girl in old-fashioned clothing, looking for Sam. While she tries to forget these nightmares and just have fun, she starts to see visions during the daytime.
- The School beneath the Dome: Two alien women, Deimos and Phobos, imprison Marlborough Girls' High School in a transparent dome in order to study human education. Deanna Darwin, captain of the Fifth Form, is determined to defeat the aliens. But she has to contend with things like the aliens encasing her in a magnetic force field so she cannot eat or touch anything, and the weird effects the imprisonment seems to be having on the girls.
- The School For Sleepyheads – Orphan Sue Morton works for her aunt Daisy's boarding school, where all the staff and pupils are too lazy to work. Sue finds out that Miss Barrie, a scientist and Miss Charton, the secretary, have plans to take over the school so they can experiment on the girls.
- The School for Unwanted Ones – In 1900 Val Matthews is sent to Dr Croome's Academy for Girls. This is, of course, a cruel Squeersian establishment, complete with a phoney headmaster and forged credentials.
- The School Of The Staring Eyes – Alison Burgees is a new pupil at the exclusive St. Anne's College. There are strange things happening at the school which are connected with the portrait of Lady Sarah Churchman, the founder.
- The Secret Life of Fenella Field: Upon the death of her mother, Fenella Field discovers she was adopted as a baby and sets out to find her birth parents. She becomes a lodger with her natural family but keeps her identity a secret while waiting for the right time to reveal the truth.
- The Secret of Penny Farthing – Penny Farthing lives in a caravan with her grandfather, who falls ill. Ruthless gypsy girl Eva takes advantage of the situation, and poses as a ventriloquist, using Penny as a dummy.
- The Secret of the Red Balloons: Children are mysteriously going missing. Jo Baker and her friend Jean Simpson discover that a man at a fair is selling red balloons that children can inflate to such sizes that they are literally flying away on them. Jo is shocked to see that one of the latest children to fly away is her sister Lucy.
- The Secret Servant: Sarah Armstrong's cruel uncle took over her old home after her father died and his current will left everything to the uncle. There is a new will, which leaves everything to Sarah and her mother, but it is in the house somewhere and there are only three months to find it. Sarah disguises herself by dyeing her hair and takes a job as a servant in the house to find the will. In the meantime, Sarah is finding how hard the life of a servant is.
- The Secret Sister – Identical twins Jane and Susie want to attend a prestigious school together, but live with an impoverished aunt who can afford to send only one of them to the school. They devise a plan to each take their favourite classes by posing as the same girl.
- The Secret Star – Cassie Miller wants to follow in her father's footsteps and be a pop star. He is opposed to the idea, knowing how tough the pop world can be. But Mum approves and is helping Cassie to becoming a pop star. The trouble is, they are doing it behind Dad's back.
- The Secrets of Charlie Chatterbox – Fiona Parker is given an old ventriloquist dummy named Charlie. Only Charlie can really talk and he convinces Fiona to start performing with him. Money is tight for her and her mother, who is a widow. Mrs. Parker is working all hours to provide for them, so Fiona sees this as an opportunity to help out. Things don't run smoothly for Fiona when Charlie causes problems by insulting people. Also she is worried as he seems to have an agenda of his own.
- The Seeker – The famous music hall star Madame Nellie Selba seems to be a hard-hearted woman. But this is a front for her secret identity as The Seeker, a mysterious masked woman who helps runaway girls. Her goal is to find her own daughter, who was rendered homeless and turned out on the streets while Nellie was looking for work. When she finally traces her daughter, she discovers she has fallen foul of a racket that sells homeless children into slavery.
- The Silver Skis: Sonya Hestle's parents run a hostel at the top of a ski slope in Switzerland. Sonya loves skiing and whilst out on the slopes she meets a girl called Margit Bruner, who is from the village down in the valley.
- The Sorrows Of Sorrel – When Sorrel Sandley's father is presumed dead, her grandfather sells their home to Mrs De Vincey to pay their debts. Mrs De Vincey allows them to stay on condition that Sorrel works as a governess.
- The Story Of Heidi – An adaptation of the famous novel.
- The Story Of The Silver Skates – An adaptation of the famous novel.
- The Story of Gloria Merrill – Gloria is a promising skater but her parents want her to concentrate on ballet dancing.
- The Survivors – In the year 2084, civil war is raging because half the kingdom has been taken over by alien called Androms. Young Annella Roberts travels from Manchester down to London, dodging enemies on the way, in order to try to find her father and reunite her family.
- The Sweet Voice Of Candy Kydd – Candy Kydd is becoming famous for her singing voice, which does not please her jealous stepmother Kaye. Later she wins a scholarship for training in Italy, which leads her on a quest to find her mother she previously thought was dead.
- The Swim Kids - Daisy Mann (whose father is on the dole) and the Honorable Lady Dorothea Justin are girls from opposite ends of the social spectrum who together form a formidable synchronised swimming duo. Out of the water, however, they don't get along at all, since Daisy believes Dotty to be a snob and Dotty considers Daisy a "pleb". Consequently, they avoid each other wherever possible when not in the pool, but life has a way of constantly throwing them together.
- The Taming Of Teresa – Teresa is carried off and raised by a wolf as a baby. Years later her father finds her and brings her home, hoping he can make her act like a normal girl.
- The Tears of Toto – Before Sally Trent's father died, he gave her a clown statuette which she calls Toto. According to legend, the clown will cry real tears if great unhappiness is in store for its owner. This actually happens when Sally's relatives come to stay.
- The Three Imps – Jenni Taylor, Karen Lander and Kiki Nagomi are three close friends that attend a boarding school, the Imperial Ballet School.
- The Trail Of The Laughing Dolls – Pinkie Wayne is a British Secret Service agent operating in a German-occupied France in 1940. Her mission is to find a series of dolls each containing a secret message, left in various places by her sister, Sylvia, who is now a prisoner in German hands.
- The Traitor's Daughter: Fifteen-year-old Trixie Collins is the most popular girl at St Anne's School until her father is arrested for selling government secrets to a foreign power. Now Trixie is branded "a traitor's daughter", and becomes shunned and bullied.
- The Trouble with Boys...: At Elmond Road Comp, Mandy Lott is called upon to sort out boyfriend problems because she is considered an expert on the matter, having five brothers.
- The Truth About Troy – It seems like a dream come true when Emma Grant's mum becomes personal secretary to pop star, Troy Mercury. But despite having a kind and caring public image, Emma discovers that Troy is actually very selfish.
- The Two Faces of Fiona – Fiona Brown looks very like her cousin Gayle Gibson, a singer, and is asked to stand in for the bad tempered star at public appearances. Although she dislikes the deceit, Fiona agrees because the extra money will help make life more comfortable for her invalid mother.
- The Two Lives of Cathy O'Connor: Cathy O'Connor's cruel uncle forces her to impersonate a girl killed in an air crash.
- The Voice From The Lake – Amanda Lewis begins to hear a mysterious lonely voice coming from a lake.
- The Voice in Her Tranny: Terry Trueman is a scatterbrain and the bottom of her class. Her only interest is pop music. Then her transistor radio starts receiving messages that she is going to receive secret tuition from outer space.
- The Wandering Starrs – Dulcie Starr and her wheelchair-using sister Bella are the only survivors of an Indian raid, and hope to complete their journey to their uncle in Sweet Water Valley on foot.
- The Waters of Wonderlea – 14-year-old Ellie Garvin and her younger sister Sarah, live at Hackthorn Orphanage. One day Sarah falls and injures her back, and the doctors say she will never walk again. Ellie blames herself for the accident, and when a travelling doctor tells her of the healing waters of Wonderlea, she decides she must take Sarah and find this mysterious place. But the secret of the waters is kept by seven keepers, so she must find them.
- The Westfield Wager – Rose Westfield must win a wager for her horse's sake, but a saboteur is determined to see that she does not.
- The Whisperer: The Whisperer is plotting rebellion against the tyrannical Queen Villette of Luxaria, and plants one of his spies, Helga, in her household as a lady's maid. But Selina, one of the Queen's own spies, discovers Helga!
- The Wings of Fear - Kelly Mason's life changes when her rather peculiar cousin Leonie comes to live with Kelly's family after her leg is injured and her father killed in a climbing accident. Raised on a remote island, Leonie has developed the power to control birds by emitting a "strange, piercing whistle", which she uses to gain imaginative forms of revenge on anyone who upsets her (occasionally aided by her pet raven, Croaker).
- The Wilde Bunch: Carol Wilde has to find and manage a new bunch of children for a model agency. As the children have to be ordinary, cheeky and scruffy kids off the streets, this assignment is a handful for Carol.
- The World of Grace – Grace Harper is being trained by Madame Maratova to be a gymnast. Madame is sure Grace has the makings of a world champion and is doing all in her power to help her.
- The World on her Plate: Jill Cutts is determined to get a big scoop for the newspaper she works for. She comes across a burglary, but puts herself in danger when they see the flash of her camera and chase her down.
- The Wrong Crowd – When Tracey Brown starts at a new school, she is immediately befriended by Jane Niven and her friends. All too soon, Tracey discovers that the three are nasty bullies, and wants to break free from them – but is too afraid.
- Three's a Crowd! – Meg Turner is lonely at her new school, but Jill Gordon cheers her up. Then Meg's best friend Candy comes to live in the district and wants to get rid of Jill. But Meg is determined that the three of them will be friends.
- Tillie The Trier: Tillie is a young girl who is always willing to try something new, but things never go right for her.
- Time after Time (1997–98): Lucy Barlow picks up a wind-up watch at a car boot sale. When she winds the watch up she finds it is a time-travel device and can send her back through time and she can change things. But then she begins to question the wisdom of having such power.
- Time after Time (1999): Leanne Moore and her family have returned to Tresby for their holiday the year after their first visit. Leanne soon finds that there is something strange about Tresby; things that have happened before seem to be repeating over and over. And the Tresby poster warns that if anyone visits Tresby three times, they will stay there forever.
- Tina at Tumble Towers: Tumble Towers Boarding School is run-down and needs money for repairs if it is to stay open. Tina Dixon, whose parents own the school, discovers that the school can claim money from a special trust if it can win six trophies in one year, and this is what she sets out to do with her classmates. Unknown to Tina, Lucinda Gromley is out to sabotage them because her father wants the school grounds to build a superstore. Sometimes, though, Lucinda's tricks backfire on her!
- Tina the Tester: Tina Roberts works for a firm that tests new products to ensure they live up to the manufacturers' claims before they go on sale.
- Tina's Temper – Tina Marsh has a quick temper, which her classmates think is great fun to watch. Tina ends up getting suspended, and her former Head encourages her to use this fresh start to get her temper under control. While she takes this in, she only really decides to change when her father has heart attack after she was fighting with her sister. She is determined to stay out of trouble for the sake of her father's health.
- Tina's Tin Twin – Tina Tomkins is not a bright pupil although her father is a famous scientist. One day Dad builds a robot double of Tina, named Tara, which can learn any subject in minutes. Unfortunately, Tara turns evil.
- Tiny Tina: Humour strip about a young trouble-making girl named Tina.
- Tom Farmer Wants a Wife!: Carole Farmer sets out to find a wife for her absent-minded brother Tom, and her efforts typically meet with hilarious results.
- Too Many Cooks: Kathy Cook is an only child who wishes she could see more of her other relations in Barchester. It looks like her wish has come true when her dad gets a transfer to Barchester, where they will be near their family at last. But Kathy begins to have second thoughts once she sees the problems that come with it.
- Toots – A comic strip about the misadventures of a young girl.
- Top of the Class: A couple of girls pick on Joanne for being brilliant at schoolwork and call her "swot rag". To stop the bullying, Joanne starts deliberately underachieving. The bullying eases up, but then Joanne's mother gets the inevitable letter from school.
- Trapped in Time! – Jan and Hilary Exton are exploring the countryside through which their canal narrow boat is passing, when they take a short-cut – and find themselves 200 years in the past, when Britain's canals were being built. They are mistaken for boys and ordered to work on the construction of the canals.
- Travellers In Time – Wealthy Clarissa Mulholland and poor girl Beth accidentally travel in time from Victorian London to the 1990s.
- Treetop Tania – Tania, daughter of Lord and Lady Branksome, was washed ashore on a deserted Pacific island, after yacht sinks. The only other survivor was the captain's daughter, Iris, a Cockney. Eventually, years later, Tania is rescued, but she remembers very little of civilisation.
- Trilby will be Tops! – A mysterious woman takes an interest in Pat Trilby's sports career.
- Trixie - Follows a young blonde girl in humorous situations. She often comes up with clever solutions to the problems.
- True Love: Polly True has always been a model schoolgirl, but things get awkward when her mother starts a teaching job at her school. It gets even more awkward when romance begins to bloom between Mum and the principal, Mr Love. Polly's classmates start teasing her over it and accuse her of getting preferential treatment because of it. Polly starts deliberately misbehaving in the hope it will stop the romance and the teasing. But of course it backfires; Polly gets suspended and causes her mother a lot of heartbreak. Polly now realises her mistake, but can she put it right?
- Tufty- The Tale Of A Pony – Jean Walker is among twelve riders of Springfield Pony Club undergoing a trial for the Stanton Cup team – the five riders who did the best in the trial will be chosen for the actual team. Tufty, Jean's pony, is not a thoroughbred riding pony like the others in the club, but despite his rather ungainly appearance, Tufty is very intelligent and willing to learn.
- Two Faced!: Beverley Walton does not like new girl Shelley Taylor, but is friendly towards her because she fancies Shelley's brother Steve.
- Uncle Tom's Cabin – An adaptation of Harriet Beecher Stowe's anti-slavery novel.
- Uncle William's Will – When William Tent dies, his will sets up a number of tests to decide who should inherit his fortune – his nieces Jo and Jill or their cousins Edna and Nigel.
- Unfair to Favourites – Jayne and Jean Gentry seem to have everything going for them in the activities they pursue: ballet (Jean), and athletics (Jayne). But there is one problem – it has bred favoritism among their parents. Dad favours Jayne because she pursues sport, Mum favours Jean because she does the same with ballet, and neither parent pays much attention to the other girl.
- Vickie And Her Violin – When he dies, violinist Rupert West leaves his cook's daughter money and a violin on the condition that she passes a certain music exam by the end of the years. His relatives want that money so they wish to see Vickie fail.
- Waif Of The Wilds – In a little explored region of Africa, where the lion ruled undisturbed by man's influence, Ralph Graham, a well known camera man, is filming another of his wild life series for television. He is surprised to find a girl running with antelope and living with lions.
- Wait-For-Me Island – Debby Carlton lives isolated with her father on an island in the Pacific. Then an opportunity presents itself to let Debby see more of the world and she hopes she can expose George Frame, a man who had claimed a painting of Mr Carlton was his own work.
- Waltzing Matilda – Matilda "Tillie" Baker is determined to become a ballroom dancer, taking on many part-time jobs to earn money for the lessons.
- Wanderer – A story narrated by a young horse named Wanderer, who remembers the owners he has had since he was born, some kind and some not so kind.
- Watchdog Winnie - Winnie Woods is tasked with looking after spoiled Carla Carstairs, a spoiled girl who is on the brink of being expelled from St Wogan's, in exchange for Carla's father funding Winnie's schooling. But Winnie finds that keeping Carla out of trouble comes at her own expense.
- Watcher in the Wings – In the 1900s, the Dale family work as a group of travelling music hall artistes. Sara, the youngest child, finds an old costume hamper and borrows a song book from it. Then strange things happen as if someone was watching over the items in the hamper.
- Wendy And The Wee Ones – After her plane is wrecked, Wendy Green finds herself in the land of the Little People. She tries to get back home, but then she also becomes small.
- Wendy The Tennis Wonder – Wendy Woods lives with her grandparents on a small Scottish island. One day she finds her grandmother's old tennis racket and discovers her love of tennis. She convinces her grandparents to let her go to boarding school, where she will get the chance to play with other girls.
- Wendy's Web – Hannah Matthews discovers that new classmate Wendy is actually an alien planning to kidnap Hannah and her friends for experimentation aboard Wendy's spaceship.
- Wendy's Wishing Well – A young girl lives at a cafe with a wishing well. She devotes herself to making people's wishes come true.
- Wendy's Wonder Horse – After a bad riding accident, Wendy Barne's father, a scientist, makes her an electronic horse she names Miracle. The horse has extra abilities such as extendible legs and eye beams.
- When Harry Dumped Sally – When Sally is dumped by Harry, she takes her revenge by playing nasty tricks that get Harry into a great deal of trouble at school.
- When Sam Came to Stay - Gina Robson is thrilled when her mother invites Gina's boyfriend, Sam, to stay with them for six weeks while his parents visit Hong Kong. But having Sam around all the time is not always wonderful.
- Which Twin for Captain? – Twins Sammy and Susie Wainwright are both standing for School Captain, and this is causing discord between the twins.
- While Mum's Away...: Gina Sharp's mother is working abroad, so her bossy sister Alison has been left in charge. Gina is finding this difficult and the girls are constantly arguing. Gina does not realise that she herself is not helping matters much by being selfish.
- Who's Her Ladyship? – It is thought that either Poppy Summers or Queenie Brown is the missing heiress to the Winters estate. But the sudden switch from rags to riches is taking its toll on the girls.
- Wildcat of the Court – Princess Pandora is rescued from a tower where she has been imprisoned all her life. Such an upbringing has left her rough and tough, which is not suitable princess material. Her relatives try to get rid of her, but they have reckoned without her popularity with the populace.
- Willa the Wisp – Fashion Model Willa Browne has converted an old London bus into a boutique and with her friends, Ruth and Jane, sets off on a tour of France to give fashion shows in various towns.
- Winners Don't Quit! – Rachel Richmond's greatest wish is to become the best tennis player ever. But because of her dedication, people consider her ruthless and nickname her "The Robot".
- Wish Upon a Star – Dawn Adams has always longed for a best friend, so when she sees a shooting star one night, she wishes for one. Next day, Stella Starr and her family move in next door and the girls become best friends. But some things about the Starr family puzzle Dawn – is it possible that they are aliens?
- Witch! – Accused of being descended from the village witch, Black Bess, newcomer Ellie Ross is finding life in Littledene very difficult. And she is making it all the more difficult by refusing to tell her parents about the situation because they are enjoying life in Littledene.
- Wonderful Wanda – Karen Baker and Clare Matthews think life at St Anne's Boarding School is boring until new girl Wanda Jackson arrives. All of a sudden, things liven up – not least because Wanda seems to have strange powers.
- Workhouse Wendy – A Victorian girl goes undercover to investigate conditions at the workhouse run by her parents, but when they are suddenly killed at sea, she is believed to be dead as well. Her uncle, the only one aware that she is still inside the workhouse, claims the family fortune and pays the corrupt Beadle to keep her there as an inmate.
- Yesterday's Children – Two girls get lost on the way to a school camp and discover they have gone back in time to a countryside village. They help the inhabitants with various problems while trying to figure out a way to return to their own time.

== Recognition ==
The lyrics to the song "Melody Lee" by the British punk rock group the Damned, on their 1979 album Machine Gun Etiquette, were borrowed entirely from the dialogue balloons of Bunty comics.

On 19 March 2012, the Royal Mail launched a special stamp collection to celebrate Britain's rich comic book history. The collection featured The Beano, The Dandy, Eagle, The Topper, Roy of the Rovers, Bunty, Buster, Valiant, Twinkle and 2000 AD.

== See also ==
- British girls' comics
