= 1967 in comics =

Notable events of 1967 in comics.

== Events and publications ==
=== Year overall ===
- In The Daily Orange, the Syracuse University students' newspaper, the initial story of Vaugh Bode’s Cheech Wizard, Race to the Moon, appears.
- In Milan, Renzo Barbieri and Giorgio Cavedon, after the bankruptcy of their Editrice 66, set up another publishing house specialized in erotic comics, ErreGi. The new label immediately gets a great public success.
- On Almanacco dei comics, the catalog of the Lucca International Comics Fair, the first Italian graphic novel, La rivolta dei racchi (The riot of the ugly people) by Guido Buzzelli, is published.
- La Vilaine Lulu by Yves-Saint Laurent (Tchou). The work, an erotic graphic novel created by the fashion designer ten years earlier, becomes controversial for its sadistic and pedophilic content.

=== January ===
- January 7: Wim Lensen and Dick Matena's Polletje Pluim makes its debut in the women's weekly Prinses.
- January 11: The final issue of the Flemish children's magazine Pum-Pum is published.
- January 17: Greg and William Vance's Bruno Brazil makes its debut in Tintin.
- January 17: In Tintin, Greg and Eddy Paape's Luc Orient makes its debut. In the same issue, Mach 1 pour Steve Warson by Jean Graton, with the first appearance of the Michel Vaillant’s nemesis, the Leader.
- January 20: The Rolling Stones release their album Between the Buttons. On the back cover, a comic strip drawn by drummer Charlie Watts can be seen.
- January 21: The first issue of the British comics magazine Pow! is published. It will run until 13 January 1968.
- January 21: The first issue of the British girls' comics magazine Mandy is published. It will run until 1991.
- January 21: In Italy, the first issue of the comic series Pappagone (Gallo Rosso), by Luciano Bernasconi and Peppino De Filippo starts serialisation. De Filippo, who interpreted the protagonist in television, appears also in the series as a secondary character.
- Blackhawk #228, the beginning of "the New Blackhawk Era" — in the issues that follow, all characters but team leader Blackhawk gain a costumed superhero alter-ego at the behest of a shadowy government agency. (DC Comics)
- Detective Comics #359, "The Million Dollar Debut of Batgirl," written by Gardner Fox and illustrated by Carmine Infantino. (DC Comics)--first appearance of Batgirl
- "The Death of Ferro Lad" story arc begins in Adventure Comics #352, by Jim Shooter, Curt Swan, and George Klein (continued in Adventure Comics #353). (DC Comics)--first appearance of the Fatal Five
- Fightin' 5 #41—last issue, canceled by Charlton.
- Le dernier Spartiate by Jacques Martin.
- In Hara-Kiri, first episode of the underground comic Pravda la surviveuse by Guy Pellaert; for its feminist and anti-consumerist themes, it anticipates the youth protest of May 68.

=== February ===
- February 9: In Spirou, the Lucky Luke story La Diligence by René Goscinny and Morris starts serialisation.
- February 18: The first issue of the British comics magazine Fantastic is published. It will run until February 1968.
- February 25: The first issue of the British girls' comics magazine Tina is published, but will be cancelled in September, when it merges with Princess to become Princess Tina.
- February 28: In Tintin, the Ric Hochet story Suspense à la Télévision by Tibet and André-Paul Duchâteau starts serialisation.
- Ghost Rider #1 published
- Warfront #39 (1951 series) the final issue, canceled by Harvey Comics.
- Thor #137: Ulik debuts.
- Spyman is cancelled.
- In Walt Disney’s comics and stories, The Red Wasp Mystery, by Cecil Beard and Paul Murry, marks the debut of Red Wasp, a Mouseton superhero.
- Gerard Wiegel's Professor Cumulus debuts in De Volkskrant, where his adventures will run until 1970.

=== March ===
- March 21: Ill pioniere becomes a supplement to Noi Donne.
- "The Adult Legion" story arc begins in Adventure Comics #354, by Jim Shooter, Curt Swan, and George Klein (Concludes next issue) (DC Comics)
- The character Peacemaker, who debuted in November 1966, now receives his own series.
- The final issues of Dracula and Frankenstein are published by Dell Comics.
- In Donald Duck, A Whale of an Adventure, by Vic Lockman and Tony Strobl is printed, which marks the debut of Moby Duck.

=== April ===
- April 1: David Sutherland's Billy the Cat and Katie makes its debut in The Beano. It will run until 1971.
- April 4: In Peanuts the yellow bird Woodstock makes its debut, but he will only receive his name on 22 June 1970.
- April 14: Sezgin Burak's Tarkan debuts in the daily pages of Hürriyet.
- April 15: The first issue of the British comics magazine Terrific is published. It will run until 3 February 1968.
- C.C. Beck and Otto Binder's Fatman the Human Flying Saucer makes his debut.

=== May ===
- May 1: In an issue of the American satirical magazine The Realist Wally Wood creates the Disneyland Memorial Orgy, a highly subversive deconstruction of familiar Disney characters to commemorate Walt Disney's passing at the end of 1966.
- May 5: Robert Crumb's character Mr. Natural makes his first appearance in the first issue of the underground newspaper Yarrowstalks.
- May 14: In Topolino, Duckburg Delivered, a parody of Torquato Tasso’s Jerusalem Delivered, by Guido Martina and Giovan Battista Carpi, is printed.
- May 25: The final episode of David Wright and Peter Meriton's Carol Day is published.
- May 28: The first episode of Captain Kate by Jerry and Hally Skelly is published. It will run until 21 May 1972.
- The first issue of The Many Ghosts of Doctor Graves is published. It will run until January 1986.
- In Uncle Scrooge, The Cattle King by Carl Barks.
- In Almanacco Topolino, Paperone e l’angolare di sicurezza, by Rodolfo Cimino and Massimo De Vita marks the debut of Battista, Uncle Scrooge’s butler.
- Le Jene del Mare (The Sea Hyenas) by Guido Nolitta and Gallieno Ferri; the treasure seeker Digging Bill, recurring character in the Zagor series, makes his debut.

=== June ===
- June 1: In Pilote, the Blueberry story L'Homme au Poing d'Acier (The Steel-fisted Man), by Jean-Michel Charlier and Jean Giraud, starts serialisation.
- June 10: The first issue of the Dutch girls comics magazine Tina is published.
- June 15: In Pilote, the Astérix story Asterix and the Chieftain's Shield by René Goscinny and Albert Uderzo starts serialisation.
- June 19: Jimmy Hughes' Bully Beef and Chips makes its debut.
- Blue Beetle #1 (vol. 5) (Charlton)--first appearance of The Question
- The first issue of the Italian Western comics magazine Rodeo (Edizioni Audace) is published. It contains Verso l'ignoto, the first episode of Storia del West by Gino D'Antonio and Renzo Calegari, that will run until December 1980.

=== July ===
- July 1: The final episode of Roland J. Scott's long-running newspaper comic series Sally's Sallies and Scott's Scrapbook, which respectively ran since 1926 and 1931, is published.
- July 8: The final episode of Philip Francis Nowlan's Buck Rogers newspaper comic is published.
- July 11: In Tintin, the Michel Vaillant story Le Cirque Infernal by Jean Graton starts serialisation.
- July 28: Violet Moore Higgins, American illustrator and comic artist (Drowsy Dick), dies at age 80.
- The first issue of the German comics magazine Bussi Bär is published by Rolf Kauka's comics company.
- The first issue of the Italian comics magazine Sergeant Kirk is published. In it Héctor Germán Oesterheld and Hugo Pratt's Corto Maltese makes its debut in the story The Ballad of the Salty Sea.
- Our Army at War #182: Artist Neal Adams makes his DC Comics debut with the short story "It's My Turn to Die".
- Strange Adventures, with issue #202, changes format from science fiction to supernatural fantasy. (DC Comics)
- The Amazing Spider-Man #50' "Spider-Man No More!," written by Stan Lee and illustrated by John Romita, Sr. (Marvel Comics)
- Robert Crumb's Snoid makes his debut in the second issue of Yarrowstalks.

=== August ===
- August 17: In Spirou, Un Métier de Chien (A Dog's Work) by Maurice Rosy and Derib starts serialisation, marking the debut of the series Les Aventures d'Attila, with a dog, agent of the Swiss secret service, as protagonist.
- The Adventures of Jerry Lewis #101: "Jerry the Asto-Nut", Neal Adams' first full-length story for DC.
- Superman #199 Writer Jim Shooter and artist Curt Swan crafted the story "Superman's Race With the Flash!" which featured the first race between the Flash and Superman, two characters known for their super-speed powers.
- Closure of the longtime publisher American Comics Group, and the cancellation of their long-running titles Adventures into the Unknown (174 issues), Forbidden Worlds (145 issues), and Unknown Worlds (57 issues).
- In the third issue of the underground newspaper Yarrowstalks Robert Crumb's character Flakey Foont makes his debut.
- The first issue of Not Brand Echh is published. It will run until May 1969.
- The final episode of Osamu Tezuka's Ambassador Magma is published.
- In Huey, Dewey and Louie Junior Woodchucks, Rescue of the Grand Mogul, by Vic Lockman and Tony Strobl; debut of the Gran Mogul.

=== September ===
- September 7: The first episode of Pierre Seron's Les Petits Hommes debuts in Spirou.
- September 11: The first episode of Gordon Bess' Redeye is published.
- September 23: The British comics magazines Princess and Tina merge into Princess Tina. It will exist in this form until 1973.
- September 26: In Spirou, the Lucky Luke story Le Pied-Tendre, by René Goscinny and Morris starts serialisation.

=== October ===
- October 1: The first episode of the TV adaptation of Jean Dulieu's Paulus the woodgnome is published, the first TV adaptation of a Dutch comic strip.
- October 11: P. Hans Frankfurther establishes the Dutch comics appreciation society Het Stripschap, the oldest and longest-running of its kind in the Netherlands.
- October 12: In Spirou, the Spirou and Fantasio story Panade à Champignac by André Franquin starts serialisation.
- Strange Adventures #205 (DC Comics): first appearance of Deadman, and the first known depiction of narcotics in a story approved by the Comics Code Authority.
- Strange Suspense Stories is relaunched for the fourth and final time. It will run until September 1969.
- Gold Key publishes the first Star Trek comics album.
- The final episodes of EsseGesse's Captain Miki and Il grande Blek are published.
- In Uncle Scrooge, King Scrooge the First by Carl Barks and Tony Strobl is first printed, the last Scrooge McDuck story written by Barks, before his retirement.

=== November ===
- November 4: First issue of Ciccio & Franco, by Luciano Bernasconi (Gallo Rosso)
- November 9: Pierre Christin and Jean-Claude Mézières's Valérian et Laureline makes its debut in Pilote with the story Valerian Contre Les Mauvais Rêves.
- November 30: The final gag of Bob De Moor's experimental gag comic Balthazar is published in Tintin.
- Ghost Rider, with issue #7, canceled by Marvel.
- Thunderbolt, with issue #60, canceled by Charlton.
- Peacemaker, with issue #5, canceled by Charlton.
- First issue of the magazine Eureka (Editoriale Corno), directed by Luciano Secchi.

=== December ===
- December 5: In Tintin, the Michel Vaillant story Km. 357 by Jean Graton is published.
- December 16: The first episode of Gordon Bell's Pup Parade is published in The Beano.
- December 29: In Pilote, the Blueberry story La Piste des Sioux by Jean-Michel Charlier and Jean Giraud starts serialisation.
- Judomaster, with issue #98, canceled by Charlton.
- Captain Atom, with issue #89, canceled by Charlton.
- King Comics, with issue #11, publishes its final issue of Flash Gordon.
- Saga de Xam by Jean Rollin and Nicholas Devil (Eric Losfeld).

=== Specific date unknown ===
- In Toronto, Canada, George Henderson aka Captain George, opens the first Canadian comics store Memory Lane, which is also one of the oldest in the world at that time. The store will remain in business until the 1980s.
- Bill Tidy's The Cloggies debuts in the satirical magazine Private Eye.
- Don Martin's Captain Klutz debuts in one of Mad Magazine's paperbacks.
- Vaughn Bodé's Cheech Wizard makes his debut.
- Robin Wood and Lucho Olivera 's Nippur de Lagash makes its debut.
- The first issue of Gordon Johnston's It Happened in Canada is published.
- The final episode of Jerry Robinson's True Classroom Flubs and Fluffs is published.
- The final episode of Robert Renzi and Augusto Pedrazza's Akim is published.
- The final episode of Alfred Mazure's Dick Bos is published.
- Kinney National Company acquires National Periodical Publications (a.k.a. DC Comics).
- A tumultuous year for Charlton Comics, as they debut titles like Blue Beetle (vol. 5), The Many Ghosts of Doctor Graves, Peacemaker, and Timmy the Timid Ghost; but are forced to cancel Fightin' 5, Thunderbolt, the afore-mentioned Peacemaker, Judomaster, and Captain Atom.
- George Perry and Alan Aldridge's The Penguin Book of Comics is published, the first British reference guide about comics. It will receive a revised edition in 1971.
- Roberto Altomann publishes Geste Hypergraphique, a comic book with abstract imagery, a surreal plot and symbols and freeform interpunction.
- Ralph Dunagin's Dunagin's People makes its debut. It will run until 2001.
- Jean-Pol and Jacques van Melkebeke create Bi-Bip for Het Laatste Nieuws. The comic strip will have an unexpected international success and run until 1969.
- Belgian novelist Hugo Claus and cartoonist hugOKÉ make a satirical comic book, Belgman.
- In India, Anant Pai establishes the historical-educational comic book series Amar Chitra Katha.

== Births ==
=== February ===
- February 20: Kurt Cobain, American rock singer and guitarist (made some comics in his diaries, which were posthumously released), (d. 1994).

=== August ===
- August 18: Brian Michael Bendis, American comic book writer and artist (Marvel Comics, DC Comics).
- August 21: Charb, French cartoonist and journalist (Charlie Hebdo), (d. 2015)

== Deaths ==
=== January ===
- January 21: Homer Fleming, American cartoonist and comics artist (Craig Kennedy), dies at age 84.

=== March ===
- March 19: Gil Turner, American animator, comics artist and film producer (Looney Tunes comics, Hanna-Barbera comics, Disney comics), dies at age 54.
- March 20: Anders Bjørgaard, Norwegian illustrator and comics artist (Jens von Bustenskjold), dies at age 76.

=== April ===
- April 18: Pierre Mouchot, A.K.A. Chott, French comics publisher and comics artist (Éditions Piere Mouchot, Société d'Éditions Rhodaniennes), dies at age 54.
- April 28: Jack Romer, American comics artist (TV Titters, Bobo & Binky), dies at age 69.

=== May ===
- May 9: Wallace Carlson, American animator and comics artist (The Nebbs), dies at age 73.
- May 25: David Wright, British illustrator and comics artist (Carol Day), dies at age 64.

=== June ===
- June 7: Willy Lateste, Belgian animator and comics artist (historical comics for Ons Volkske), dies at age 36.
- June 16: Sam van Vleuten, Jr., Dutch illustrator and comic artist (made a comic about Baron Münchchausen), dies at age 62.
- June 21: Stan Kaye, American comics artist (Hayfoot Henry, continued Superman, Batman), dies at age 50.
- June 27: Charles A. Winter, aka Chuck Winter, American comics artist (Liberty Belle), dies at age 80.

=== July ===
- July 4: Ondřej Sekora, Czech journalist, painter, writer, illustrator and comics artist (Ferda Mravenec, aka Ferda the ant), dies at age 67.

=== August ===
- August 26: Marian Walentynowicz, Polish architect, illustrator and comics artist (Koziolek Matolek, Malpka Fiki Miki), dies at age 81.

=== September ===
- September 4: Margit Uppenberg, aka Gobi, Swedish comics artist and illustrator (Pian), dies at age 60.
- September 28: Romà Bonet Sintes, AKA Bon, Spanish caricaturist and comic artist, dies at age 81.

=== October ===
- October 1: Bob Powell, American comics artist (co-creator of Blackhawk, continued Sheena, Queen of the Jungle and Mr. Mystic), dies at age 51.
- October 3: Pinto Colvig, American clown, editorial cartoonist (Life on the Radio Wave), and voice actor, dies at age 75.
- October 14: Jacques Blondeau, American comic artist (made several newspaper comic adaptations of literary novels), commits suicide at age 43.

=== December ===
- December 12: Mac Raboy, American comics artist (continued Captain Marvel, Jr., Green Lama and Flash Gordon), dies at age 53.

=== Specific date unknown ===
- Jean Bellus, French comics artist (Georgie, Laurel et Hardy, worked on Le Crime Ne Paie Pas), dies at age 55 or 56.
- Jean Dratz, Belgian painter, caricaturist and comics artist (Petit Chéri), dies at age 61 or 62.
- Li Fan-fu, Chinese comics artist (Young Master, Old Master Ho), dies at age 60 or 61.
- Branko Vidić, Serbian novelist and comics writer (Zigomar), dies at age 62 or 63.

== Exhibitions ==
- April 7–June 12: Bande dessinée et figuration narrative, Musée des Arts Décoratifs, Paris.

== Conventions ==
- June 16–18: Houston Comic Convention (Southwesterncon II) (Ramada Inn, Houston, Texas) — first Houston-based comics convention; 124 attendees.
- June 17–18: Detroit Triple Fan Fair (Park Shelton Hotel, Detroit, Michigan) — co-produced by Shel Dorf and Hal Shapiro; Guest of Honor: Roger Zelazny; presentation of the first Nova Award.
- June 30–July 2: Salone Internazionale dei Comics (Lucca, Italy) — 3rd edition of this festival
- July 14–16: Academy Con (City Squire Inn, New York City) — 3rd edition of this convention; attendees include Frank Frazetta, Roy Krenkel, and Stephen Hickman

== Awards ==
=== Alley Awards ===
Best Comic Magazine Section

- Adventure Book with the Main Character in the Title - The Amazing Spider-Man (Marvel Comics)
- Adventure Hero Title with One or More Characters in Own Strip - Strange Tales (Marvel Comics)
- Super Hero Group Title - Fantastic Four (Marvel Comics)
- Non-Super-Powered Group Title - Challengers of the Unknown (DC Comics)
- Fantasy/SF/Supernatural Title - The Many Ghosts of Doctor Graves (Charlton Comics)
- Western Title - Ghost Rider (Marvel Comics)
- War Title - Sgt. Fury and his Howling Commandos (Marvel Comics)
- Humor Title: Teenage - Archie (Archie Comics)
- Humor Title: Costumed - Not Brand Echh (Marvel Comics)
- Humor Title: Juvenile - Uncle Scrooge (Western Publishing)
- All-Reprint Title - Fantasy Masterpieces (Marvel Comics)
- Combination New & Reprint Material Title - Marvel Super-Heroes (Marvel Comics)

Best Professional Work

- Editor - Stan Lee (Marvel Comics)
- Writer - Stan Lee
- Pencil Artist - Jack Kirby
- Inking Artist - Joe Sinnott
- Cover - Strange Adventures #207, by Neal Adams (DC Comics)
- Coloring - Magnus, Robot Fighter (Gold Key Comics)
- Full-Length Story - "Who's Been Lying in My Grave?", by Arnold Drake & Carmine Infantino, Strange Adventures #205 (DC Comics)
- Feature Story - "Lost Continent of Mongo" by Archie Goodwin and Al Williamson, Flash Gordon #4 (King Comics)
- Regular Short Feature - (tie) "Tales of Asgard" and "Tales of the Inhumans", both by Stan Lee & Jack Kirby, in The Mighty Thor (Marvel Comics)
- Hall of Fame - The Spirit, by Will Eisner

Popularity Poll

- Best Costumed or Powered Hero - Spider-Man (Marvel Comics)
- Best Normal Adventure Hero - Nick Fury, Agent of S.H.I.E.L.D. (Marvel Comics)
- Best Super-Powered Group - Fantastic Four (Marvel Comics)
- Best Normal Adventure Group - Challengers of the Unknown (DC Comics)
- Best Male Normal Supporting Character - J. Jonah Jameson (The Amazing Spider-Man) (Marvel Comics)
- Best Female Normal Supporting Character - Mary Jane Watson (The Amazing Spider-Man) (Marvel Comics)
- Best Villain - Doctor Doom (Fantastic Four) (Marvel Comics)
- Best New Strip - "Deadman", by Arnold Drake & Carmine Infantino, in Strange Adventures (DC Comics)
- Best Revived Strip - Blue Beetle (Charlton Comics)
- Strip Most Needing Improvement - Batman (DC Comics)
- Strip Most Desired for Revival - Adam Strange (DC Comics)

Newspaper Strip Section

- Best Adventure Strip - Prince Valiant, by Hal Foster
- Best Human Interest Strip - On Stage, by Leonard Starr
- Best Humor Strip - Peanuts, by Charles Schulz
- Best Humor Panel - Dennis the Menace, by Hank Ketcham
- Best Miscellaneous Strip - Ripley's Believe It or Not
- Hall of Fame Award - Flash Gordon, by Alex Raymond

Fan Activity Section

- Best All-Article Fanzine - (tie) Batmania and Gosh Wow
- Best All-Strip Fanzine - Star-Studded Comics
- Best All-Fiction Fanzine - Stories of Suspense
- Best Article/Strip Fanzine - Fantasy Illustrated
- Best Fiction/Strip Fanzine - Star-Studded Comics
- Best Article/Fiction Fanzine - (tie) Gosh Wow and Huh!
- Best Fannish One-Shot - Fandom Annual
- Best Article on Comic Book Material - "Blue Bolt and Gang" (Gosh Wow #1)
- Best Article on Comic Strip Material - "Gully Foyle" (Star-Studded Comics #11)
- Best Regular Fan Column - "What's News", by Dave Kaler
- Best Fan Fiction - "Nightwalker", by Larry Brody (Gosh Wow #1)
- Best Fan Comic Strip - "Xal-Kor", by Richard "Grass" Green
- Best Fan Artist - George Metzger
- Best Comic Strip Writer - Larry Herndon
- Best Fan Project - 1967 South-Western Con
- Best Newsletter - On the Drawing Board, by Bob Schoenfeld

== First issues by title ==
=== Marvel Comics ===
America's Best TV Comics
Release: mid-year. Writer: Stan Lee. Artists: Jack Kirby, Paul Reinman, Dick Ayers, John Romita Sr.

Ghost Rider

Release: February. Writers: Gary Friedrich and Roy Thomas. Artists: Dick Ayers and Vince Colletta.

Not Brand Echh

Release: August. Editor: Stan Lee.

=== Charlton Comics ===
Blue Beetle (vol. 5)

Release: June by Charlton Comics. Writer/Artist: Steve Ditko.

The Many Ghosts of Doctor Graves

Release: May by Charlton Comics. Editor: Dick Giordano.

Peacemaker

Release: March by Charlton Comics. Writer: Joe Gill. Artist: Pat Boyette.

Timmy the Timid Ghost vol. 2

Release: October by Charlton Comics. Editor: Pat Masulli.

=== Other publishers ===
Valérian and Laureline, in Pilote magazine

Release: November by Dargaud. Writer: Pierre Christin. Artist: Jean-Claude Mézières.

Wonder Wart-Hog

Release: Millar Publishing Company. Writer: Gilbert Shelton and Tony Bell. Artist: Gilbert Shelton.

== Initial appearances by character name ==
=== Charlton Comics ===
- Banshee, in Blue Beetle #2 (August)
- Captain Willy Schultz, in Fightin' Army #76 (October)
- The Iron Corporal, in Army War Heroes #22 (November)
- Madmen, in Blue Beetle #3
- Prankster, in Thunderbolt #60 (October/November)
- Punch and Jewelee, in Captain Atom #85 (March)
- The Question, in Blue Beetle #1 (June)

=== DC Comics ===
- Aquagirl in Aquaman #33 (May)
- Awesome Threesome, in Aquaman #36 (November)
- B'wana Beast in Showcase #66 (February)
- Beauty Blaze, in Adventure Comics #355 (April)
- Black Manta in Aquaman #35 (August)
- Deadman, in Strange Adventures #205 (October)
- Element Girl in Metamorpho #10 (February)
- Fatal Five, in Adventure Comics #352 (January)
  - Emerald Empress
  - Mano
  - Persuader
  - Tharok
  - Validus
- Barbara Gordon, in Detective Comics #359 (January)
- Lion-Mane in Hawkman #20 (June)
- Mad Mod, in Teen Titans #7 (DC Comics)
- Nuidis Vulko, in Brave and the Bold #73 (September)
- One Man Meltdown, in Batman #195 (September)
- Rama Kushna in Strange Adventures #205 (October)
- Reflecto, in Adventure Comics #354 (March)

=== Marvel Comics ===
- Abomination
- Banshee, in X-Men #28 (January)
- Black Knight (Dane Whitman)
- Blastaar
- Captain Marvel (Mar-Vell)
- Changeling
- Cobalt Man
- Crusher
- Valentina Allegra de Fontaine
- Dreadnought
- Grotesk
- Growing Man
- Kingpin
- Leap-Frog
- Live Wire
- Living Diamond
- Living Tribunal
- Lurking Unknown
- MODOK
- Mogul of the Mystic Mountain
- Ogre
- Phantom Rider
- Psycho-Man
- Clay Quartermain
- Robbie Robertson
- Ronan the Accuser
- Scorpio
- Sentry
- Shocker
- Tarantula
- Ulik
- Zom

=== Comic strips ===
- Cheech Wizard in college newspapers around Syracuse University
- Mr. Natural in Yarrowstalks #1 (June 5)
- Woodstock in Peanuts (April 4)
