= Timmy the Timid Ghost =

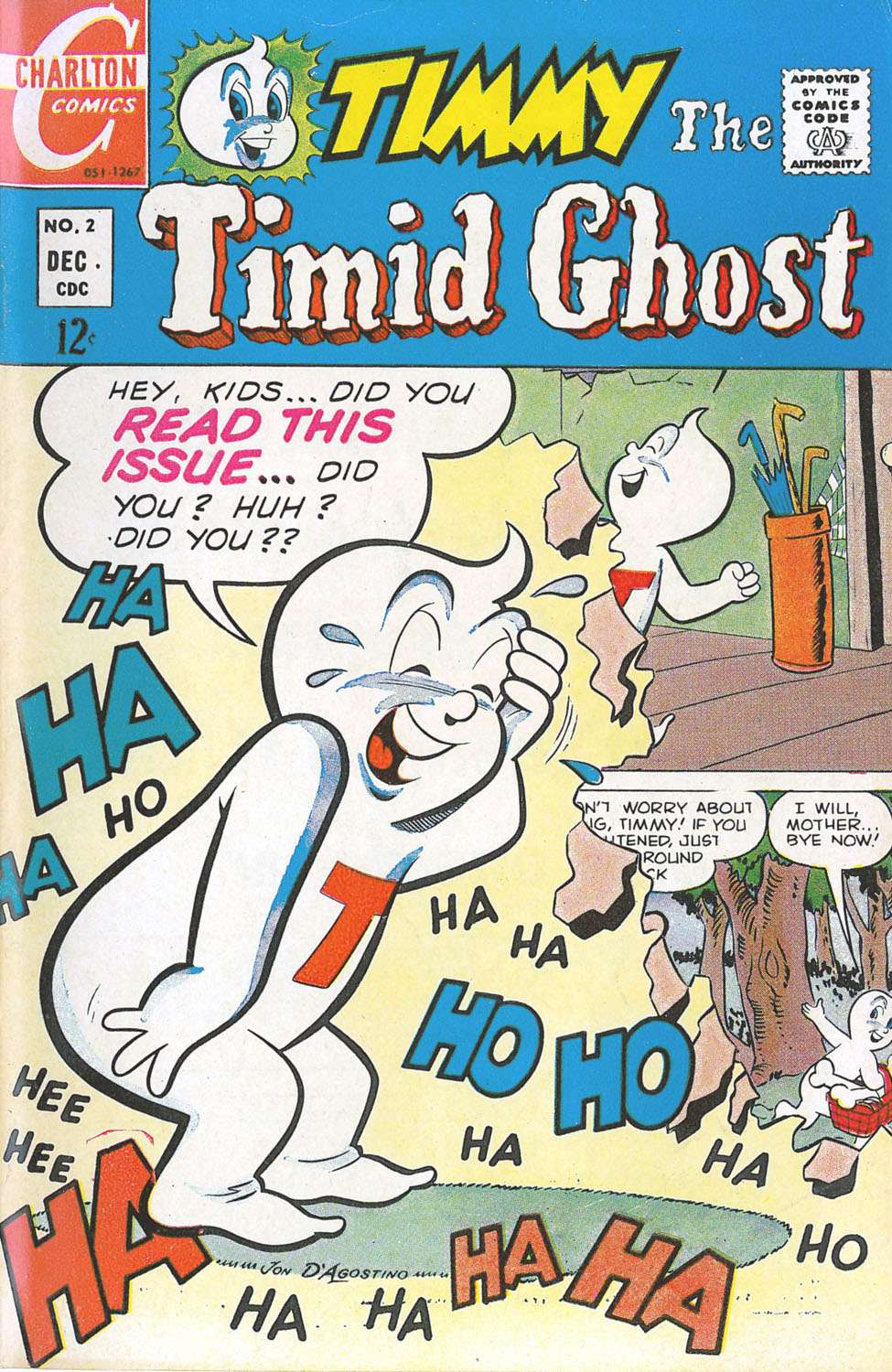
- Cover of Timmy the Timid Ghost (1967) #2, art by Jon D'Agostino.

Publication information
- Publisher: Charlton Comics
- First appearance: Atomic Mouse vol. 1, #5 (Nov. 1953)
- Created by: Al Fago

In-story information
- Species: Ghost
- Abilities: flight, intangibility

Timmy the Timid Ghost is a fictional comic book ghost, whose adventures were published by Charlton Comics.

== Publication history ==
Timmy the Timid Ghost first appeared as a minor character in an Atomic Mouse story, "3-D Crime Wave" by Al Fago, in Atomic Mouse #5 (November 1953).

Possibly in response to the popularity of Casper the Friendly Ghost, Timmy later graduated to his own comic book, beginning in Timmy the Timid Ghost #3 (February 1956). The numbering of this series continued from Charlton's Win a Prize #2, as indicated in the "Statement of Ownership" in issue #4. This series ran until issue #45 (September 1966).

Timmy returned in a new series in 1967, which ran for 23 issues until 1971.

In 1985, Timmy the Timid Ghost returned for a brief three-issue run, continuing the numbering from the last series. Issues #24-26 were reprints of previously published stories. This final series was canceled when Charlton Publications closed its comic book division.

== See also ==
- Homer the Happy Ghost
- List of ghosts
