= America's Best TV Comics =

- America's Best TV Comics (one-shot); Cover art main image by Jack Kirby or Larry Lieber and unconfirmed inker

Publication information
- Publisher: Marvel Comics
- Format: One-shot
- Publication date: 1967
- No. of issues: 1
- Main character(s): Fantastic Four, Spider-Man

Creative team
- Written by: Stan Lee
- Artist(s): Jack Kirby, Paul Reinman; Dick Ayers, John Romita Sr.

America's Best TV Comics is a one-shot American comic book packaged by Marvel Comics' parent company in mid-1967 in conjunction with the ABC television network to promote the network's Saturday morning cartoon lineup.

== Publication history ==
Marvel Comics, which occasionally packaged sponsored comics, created this 68-page comic book in 1967 for the ABC television network to promote the network's Saturday morning cartoon lineup. The formal credit in the comic's indicia is for Marvel's parent company, Magazine Management. The indicia also specifies, "Distributed nationally by the Independent News Company," which distributed Marvel Comics at the time. The copyright is held by ABC. Bearing a cover price of 25¢ and also distributed via mail-order, it features the Marvel characters the Fantastic Four and Spider-Man, who were debuting in half-hour animated series that fall. It also includes stories based on the upcoming animated series Journey to the Center of the Earth, The King Kong Show, George of the Jungle, and Casper the Friendly Ghost. The ABC cartoon block, which also included the series The Beatles, ran Saturdays from 9 a.m. to 12:30 p.m.

The main cover image of the Fantastic Four's Mr. Fantastic was penciled either by Jack Kirby or Larry Lieber mimicking Kirby's style, and possibly inked by either Frank Giacoia or Joe Sinnott (sources differ). All were Marvel Comics regulars. The image of the Fantastic Four in the top right-hand box is a partial reproduction of the Kirby-Sinnott cover of Fantastic Four #49 (April 1966).

The stories, in order, are:

- a 10-page, edited Casper reprint, "The Flying Horse", from The Friendly Ghost, Casper #17 (Jan. 1960) by artist Warren Kremer and an unconfirmed writer, possibly Ralph Newman;
- a 10-page, edited reprint of the 22-page "Prisoners of the Pharaoh", by writer-editor Stan Lee, penciler Kirby and inker Dick Ayers, from Fantastic Four #19 (Oct. 1963)
- a 10-page, edited reprint of the 20-page "The Birth of a Super-Hero", by writer-editor Lee and penciler-inker John Romita Sr., from The Amazing Spider-Man #42 (Nov. 1966)
- the 10-page Journey to the Center of the Earth original story "The People of the Styx", by an unknown writer and penciler-inker Paul Reinman, a Marvel Comics regular
- the 10-page King Kong original story "Kong Joins the Circus", by an uncredited creative team, and
- the 10-page George of the Jungle original story "Shep's Burial Ground", also by an uncredited team.

The comic also includes single-page ads for some ABC primetime series, with that of Cowboy in Africa and The Flying Nun penciled by John Tartaglione, and a combined ad for Custer and Batman pencilled by George Tuska.
