= Gino D'Antonio =

Italian comics writer and artist

- Born: 16 March 1927; Milan, Italy
- Died: 24 December 2006 (aged 79); Milan, Italy
- Occupation: Cartoonist

Gino D'Antonio (16 March 1927 – 24 December 2006) was an Italian comics writer and artist.

Born in Milan, D'Antonio made his professional debut in 1947, with the comic book series Jesse James published by Edizioni Della Casa, and from 1951 he started collaborating with the magazine Il Vittorioso. In 1956 he began a proficous collaboration with Fleetway Publications, for which he specialized in creating war comics. His stories were published in British publications including Tell Me Why, Junior Mirror, Junior Express and Eagle.

In 1967, D'Antonio co-created with Renzo Calegari his best-known work, the long-lasting comic book series Storia del West, which ran until 1980. In the early 1970s, he started collaborating with the magazine Il Giornalino, for which he created numerous comic series, notably Susanna, Il soldato Cascella and Uomini senza gloria. In 1987, he eventually became the head of the comics section of the magazine.

He died of a stroke in his house in Milan in 2006.
