= Storia del West =

Comic book series

Publication information
- Publisher: CEPIM
- Publication date: 1967-1980

Storia del West (i.e. "History of the West") is a comic book series created in 1967 by Gino D'Antonio and Renzo Calegari.

== Overview ==
A detailed and well-documented historical account of American frontier narrated from the point of view of a family of Irish immigrants, the MacDonalds, the series feature figures such as Wild Bill Hickok, Buffalo Bill, Calamity Jane, George Armstrong Custer, Wyatt Earp, Kit Carson. It consists of 73 issues (in its first edition) and it was published by CEPIM from 1967.

D'Antonio served as the sole writer and cover illustrator, while artists of the stories included the same D'Antonio, Renzo Calegari, Renato Polese and Sergio Tarquinio.

The series was later entirely republished between 1984 and 1990, adding new material in the early stories to reach 75 issues. Later a short story in which is revealed the real fate of George A. Custer. Anthologies of stories were released by Mondadori. The series was reprinted in colors in 1995 by Hobby & Work. Since then it was reprinted at least other two times.
