= Mandy (comics) =

British comic book for girls

- First issue of Mandy, 21 January 1967

Publication information
- Publisher: DC Thomson
- Schedule: Weekly
- Format: Newsprint magazine
- Genre: Drama, School, Romance, Humour
- Publication date: 21 January 1967 – 11 May 1991
- No. of issues: 1,269
- Main character(s): Mandy and Patch

Creative team
- Written by: W. G. Ede, Alison Fitt, Marion Turner
- Artist(s): Terry Aspin, Carmen Barbara, Claude Berridge, Leslie Branton, Pamela Chapeau, Carlos Freixas, Bert Hill, Tom Hurst, B. Jackson, George Martin, Wilf Street, Veronica Weir, Andrew Wilson

Mandy was a British comic book for girls, published weekly by DC Thomson from 21 January 1967 to 11 May 1991. The majority of the stories were serialized, typically into two or three pages per issue, over eight to twelve issues.

== Publication history ==
Mandy was published from 21 January 1967 (#1) to 11 May 1991 (#1,269), at which point it merged with Judy to become Mandy & Judy (also known as M&J). Mandy & Judy was published from 18 May 1991 (#1) until 24 May 1997 (#315), when it merged with Bunty (Bunty ceased publication completely in 2001).

Mandy annuals appeared from 1972 until 2007.

=== Mergers ===
As was common in British comics of the period, it was standard practice to merge a comic into another one when it declined in sales. Typically, three stories or strips from the canceled comic would continue for a while in the surviving comic, and both titles would appear on the cover (one in a smaller font than the other) until the title of the cancelled comic was eventually dropped. Mandy was emblematic of this practice. In early 1983, Mandy absorbed Debbie (which itself had previously absorbed Spellbound). By the time Mandy merged with Judy in 1991, that title had previously absorbed Emma in 1979 and Tracy in 1985.

== Content ==
The comic's namesake Mandy stayed on the cover of the comic for its whole run with just a few changes along the way. Mandy was instantly recognisable with her bobbed dark hair; her clothes changed, but were always colourful and kept up with 1970s fashions. Accompanying her was her red-and-white dog Patch.

Each issue had a theme usually involving a play on words. The main picture set up the theme for the story. As well as the large picture there was one small panel in the corner; often this would be a contrast to the calmer/ happier main picture.

Some recurring theme elements of Mandy stories were:

- orphans forced to live with cruel or uncaring relatives;
- girls enduring blackmail, hardship, or unpopularity to protect a secret (often on behalf of their family);
- girls slaving for cruel employers or criminals;
- saving animals from cruelty;
- cruel factories, shops, boarding schools or workhouses;
- heroines adopting masked identities to secretly help people;
- spiteful girls causing trouble for an unsuspecting cousin, foster-sister or classmate;
- girls becoming unpopular because events keep conspiring to make them appear jealous or selfish;
- blundering girls getting into one scrape after another;
- girls pretending to be disabled in order to take advantage of people;
- girls who were put under a curse or came into possession of apparently supernatural objects which adversely affected their lives, but of which they were unable to rid themselves until they worked out how;
- boyfriend-themed stories (by the 1980s).

Stories were generally moralistic in tone, with long-suffering heroines finally achieving happiness, while villainous relatives or girls who were liars, cheats, and bullies received their comeuppance.

Two of the longest-running and most popular picture stories, which also featured in almost every annual, were Angel and Valda. Angel centered on Angela Hamilton, a young, wealthy Victorian girl who discovers she has only a year to live and decides to devote her remaining time to caring for orphaned and unwanted children in the slums of the East End of London. Valda stories are set in many different times and places and follow the adventures of a girl with extraordinary abilities and apparently indefinite lifespan. Valda, who draws her physical strength from energy or light passing through a mysterious "Crystal of Life" that she carries, travels the world coming to the aid of the oppressed and those threatened by dark or supernatural forces.

Mandy also ran text stories, usually serialized in the same manner as the picture-stories, of which the most popular was The Guardian Tree. This followed the trials and tribulations of the Shaw family, when the five children are orphaned in Victorian times. The children, under the leadership of the eldest sister, Rose, escape the dreaded poorhouse by living on the moors in a cave beneath the roots of a vast tree they christen the "Guardian Tree," which appears to have mysterious and benevolent powers. The most popular text stories were often reworked and published as picture stories, including The Guardian Tree and The Sad Star.

=== M&J ===
M&J's most popular strip was Penny's Place (which was taken up by Bunty when M&J ended). The story centered on Penny, whose parents owned a cafe called Penny's Place, and her three best friends, who all lived in the same town and attended the same school. Penny's best friend Donna was from a lower-class family and had several brothers and sisters, and these siblings were often involved in storylines. The story came to an end in the late 1990s, but due to popular demand Bunty began to publish the story again from the beginning. During this time, both Bunty and Mandy published Penny's Place in their Christmas annuals.

== List of strips ==
- A Boy-Friend for Bonnie — Bonnie Martin always takes an interest in the sports and hobbies of her boyfriends. But this gets her into all sorts of scrapes such as a black eye from squash and dropping weights on her latest boyfriend's foot.
- A Friend for Fay — When orphaned Fay Ashton is given a home by her rich relations, she finds a life of misery waiting for her at the hands of her spiteful cousin Regina.
- A Friend Like Freda — Freda has always been jealous of Joyce because she is a kind, popular girl. So when Joyce suddenly moves back to the neighbourhood, Freda pretends to be friends with her while secretly causing trouble for her. Joyce soon realises she has an enemy, but does not suspect Freda.
- A Girl Called Rowan — Debbie Dawson's new friend Rowan has a strange power over plants because she is a dryad – a tree sprite. When Debbie runs away from the relatives she was staying with, Rowan goes with her.
- A Girl Called Squirrel — A girl named Squirrel lives in a tree at Greenoak Park. She wants to learn to play table tennis properly and sets out to earn a scholarship to Highgrove Private School because it has a first class table tennis team.
- A Home for Helen — Helen Grant is staying with her grandmother after her parents are killed.
- A Horse Called Henry — Henry the horse tells the story of his life.
- A Horse for Holly – Holly Reed works at Harding's Riding Stables. The Hardings are hard employers, but Holly takes solace in Golden Harvest, her favorite horse. When Golden Harvest is injured in an accident, Holly offers to buy her to save her from being destroyed and then starts training her for a championship.
- A Slave Called Sandra — Sandra Best lives with her aunt and uncle, who treat her badly and make her do all the work in the house and the laundrette that they own. She believes that her father owed them a debt that she must pay off. One thing she gets enjoyment out of is her talent for sewing and dress making.
- A Switch in Time – A mysterious girl named Kyra, claiming to be a relative from Australia, arrives at Melanie Clark's house. Kyra seems to know little about modern life and arrived in Victorian clothes, which convinces Melanie that Kyra is from the year 1884. Then Kyra reveals she is really from 2084 and was sent back in time to 1884 for a history project but her timeship crashed, stranding her in 1984. Melanie agrees to help keep her secret. (Reprinted in 1991 with the dates updated.)
- A Tale of Two Families — Ever since their parents separated, twins Carol and Rona Grant have been plotting to get the family together again, in spite of their own frequent squabbles.
- A Ticket for Timmy — Carol Burns and her family are going to emigrate to Canada in a few months. Carol is trying to raise the £100 to pay the fare for Timmy, her beloved sheepdog.
- Alison's Uncles — Alison is living in a Children's Home when she finds out she has four uncles. To decide which one will be her guardian she is trying each uncle out in turn. The first three uncles don't work out, so it all comes down to whether the fourth does.
- All Change! — Twins Lucy and Lisa Clayton are sad when their parents split up, but comfort themselves with the thought that they have each other. Then, when their gran moves in, she seems to favour Lucy over Lisa and Lisa feels left out.
- Amy Beckett Says… - After a bulldozer accidentally knocks against the old entrance archway of the school, friends Fay Davis and Karen Green, notice some strange things happening. Some younger school kids start singing an eerie skipping rhyme, then Fay and Karen start seeing things. Does it have anything to do with the mysterious Amy Beckett- and if so, what?
- Angel — Victorian lady Angela Hamilton has only a year to live. After faking a drowning accident to spare her parents the grief of watching her die slowly, Angela goes to London to dedicate her remaining time to helping the poor waifs of London as the benefactress "Miss Angel." When Angel finally succumbs to her illness, her parents, who have discovered the truth, set up a children's home in her "loving memory."
- Anna and the Piskies — Anna Graeme goes to Cornwall, where her father leads a team of men prospecting for oil. But this threatens the home of the piskies, so they take Anna prisoner in a bid to stop the "Terror" as they call it. Anna also finds herself caught in a power conflict between Benito and Aggro.
- April Fool – Talented scholarship pupil April Matthews is being blackmailed into helping nasty Shirley Kingsley be the star of their stage school – at April's expense. To ensure April's compliance, wealthy Mr Kingsley is threatening to withdraw the money he invested in April's father's business, which would cause the family to be unable to afford vital sight-saving operations for April's little sister.
- Aunt Kate's Household Companion — Prudence and Becky Land are two English orphans working their passage as cooks on a wagon train to San Francisco. Their most treasured possession is a book containing helpful hints which had been left to them by their Aunt Kate.
- Auntie Annie — Annie Armstrong's elder sister Joy returns home with her daughter Tessa. This puts Annie and Tessa in the curious position of being aunt and niece, but they are the same age. The girls are finding this awkward and to make matters worse, Annie is finding her niece a sneaky little schemer.
- Aunts at War! – Jill Marsden finds herself in the middle of a battlefield between her feuding great-aunts.
- Baby Bunting — Barbara Bunting has lived an isolated existence under Lady Tarbett, who lives in a private world that is old-fashioned and hopelessly out of touch with the modern world. When Barbara's governess falls ill, she is thrust into modern life and school. She does not have the tools and experience to deal with them and so is nicknamed "Baby Bunting". Barbara is learning to look after herself, but Lady Tarbett is still living in her private world.
- Bad Luck Barbara – When Barbara Petty and her parents move to Wavertree, she becomes persecuted by the villagers who believe she is descended from an old witch, Grandmother Petty, and blame her for any bad luck in the village. Barbara is finding it difficult to escape the situation because her parents refuse to listen and the family depends on Mr Petty's job in the village.
- Baker's Dozen — Louise Baker has to protect her puppies from horrible relatives.
- Be Nice to Nikki — Yvonne Baxter is under strict instructions from her father to be "nice" to his employer's daughter. However the girl is a vicious bully, so being "nice" to her is a nightmare. But Yvonne's father won't listen.
- Beatty's Bingo Card — Beatty Ward is a selfish girl who always wants her own way, and she never helps out or shows consideration for others. One day Beatty grumbles about there being no bingo for kids, but then she is surprised to receive a bingo card in the post – on a Sunday. It comes with the message: "A prize more precious than them all, if by full moon, full house you call." It makes no sense until Beatty brings home a football jersey with the number 3 on it and then the number 3 just vanishes from the card. Greed overtakes Beatty and she becomes determined to get all the other numbers on the card by the full moon to collect the riches that must surely be waiting for her.
- Beauty's Double — Twins, Kim and Carol Brookes were identical in appearance, but not in temperament. Kim was a tomboy while Carol was a budding beauty queen. While their parents were abroad for a year, the twins were left in the charge of Mrs Jameson, a neighbour. Then Carol's face was scarred in an accident, and she proposed that Kim should take her place for a year while the scars faded. After winning a big beauty contest in Carol's place, Kim found herself in great demand.
- Becky's Brothers — An only child, Becky Burton has always wanted a brother or sister. Then, suddenly, she finds herself with THREE foster brothers and is finding it hard to adjust.
- Behind the Green Door — Maidservant Emily Dove is hiding her siblings in her attic bedroom to save them from a horrible orphanage.
- Beryl's Birds — Newcomer Beryl Blake finds it difficult to fit in at her new school and make friends. It gets worse when she is wrongly accused of stealing a peacock brooch from one of her classmates. Later, Beryl goes to a fortune teller, who warns her that there will be trouble and sadness for her over a brightly colored bird that is not hers. To offset the bad fortune because of the bird, the fortune teller gives Beryl a whistle that has the power to charm birds. But Beryl is to use it with good intentions because the birds will sense it if she is using the whistle for angry reasons.
- Best Friends! — Terri Ford and Joanna Bain have always hated each other and aren't happy when Joanna's family move next door to Terri. It turns out that their Mums used to be best friends in school and plan to pick up where they left off. They also expect Joanna and Terri to become best friends too.
- Beth and Boy Georgie – Georgie Hope Foster enters a pairs skating competition under a boy's name with Beth Dawson. This was just for a laugh, but things get complicated when they are forced to carry on the deception when their deception gets them to the next heat.
- Beth's Beautiful Face — In Victorian times, Beth Bailey has lived all her life at Mercy House Orphanage. Then she is adopted by the Howards and now lives a life of luxury and is very happy. When she finds a photograph of a girl named Louisa who looks just like her, she reasons the Howards must have adopted her because she resembles their late daughter Louisa. Terrified she will be sent back to the orphanage if she loses her looks, she starts going to great lengths to keep her face maintained.
- Between Friends — Best friends fancy the same boy and each is finding it difficult to break the news to the other.
- Beware of Beryl! – Scheming Beryl pretends to lose her memory to get in with a film star.
- Big Bad Sister! – Jane Walker and her siblings have been fostered, but Jane feels that her talented new foster sister is taking over from her and supplanting her in the affections of her siblings.
- Billie — Billie Brewster lives with her Aunt Cora in Paradise Flats, Wolverley. Aged thirteen, Billie is fanatically keen on athletics, particularly running. But her running lands her in trouble with the School Attendance Officer and with the Wolverley Education Council. Billie returned in several sequels (with a new artist) including when she runs away from Paradise House, a home for girls, in an attempt to track down Mr Watt, the father of one of the girls in the home.
- Bionic Bruno! — Anna Konrad befriends some aliens. When it looks like her father's hotel, the Berghoff, will go out of business for lack of a winter sports instructor, the aliens send a bionic man, Bruno, to do the job.
- Birds of a Feather — Jenny Barnes is happy with her foster family the Finches and their other foster children, Robin, Polly and Jay. One day a mysterious girl appears in their garden. The newcomer can't remember her name, so they nickname her Birdie. Jenny notices something strange about Birdie, and she seems to be causing trouble for the other children.
- Blind Belinda — Belinda Stewart is blind, but also a talented singer. Her managers are Gloria and Keith Foxton, who promise her she will make enough money to receive a cure from a famous American doctor. But in fact the Foxtons are out to pocket any money Belinda makes for themselves.
- Bonny and Belinda – identical twins Bonny and Belinda are dismayed when only Bonny is adopted. Bonny smuggles Belinda into the house where they take turns enjoying their new life.
- Brampton's Big Noise — Educated at a back street school, Chris Wilson wins a scholarship to the Brampton College of Music. While there, she makes a friend in Fay Marlow, as well as enemies the snobbish Gwen Terry and Prue Fletcher.
- Caesar and Cleo – Before Mrs Amelia Weston dies, she asks her maid Cleo Payne to look after her dog Caesar. Mr Crumleigh the solicitor thinks there is another will, but the only one available divides everything among Mrs Weston's greedy nieces, Beryl and Dora Weston and Lydia Crool. But to get the money they must live together in Mrs Weston's house for six months and give Cleo and Caesar a home. If Cleo leaves before that time they inherit immediately, so they are trying to drive her out by making her life miserable.
- Can't Help Dancing — Margaret Simpson is a young nurse at Oaklands, an old mansion converted into a country hospital. Margaret keeps hearing strange music, played by a mysterious piper. Whenever she hears it, she – and anyone who touched her – find they can't help dancing!
- Carol's Cauldron — Carol Carter inherits a cauldron from an old woman who was said to be a witch, and soon discovers that the cauldron causes strange things to happen whenever anything is put inside it.
- Carrie Chase, Girl Reporter! — In Victorian England, Carrie Chase is a junior reporter for the Daily Clarion, and will do ANYTHING to get a story.
- Cat! — A cat exerts an evil influence over Livvie Clarke.
- Charmette — Charmette is a fairy who inhabits a wishing well. Her job is to make sure wishes are granted to satisfaction. But sometimes it doesn't go smoothly, such as when unpleasant types use the well.
- Cherry – Channel Champion! — Tough Cherry Perkins is a talented swimmer. A greedy couple is out to take advantage, and it involves a Channel swim.
- Choices — Diane Robinson is worried that her single parent Mum could be hurt if she becomes involved with new boyfriend Mike, so she decides to split them up before they become too serious. Things get even more complicated when she discovers Mike is actually her father!
- Cinderella Jones — Cindy Jones works for her keep at the Happyholme Guest House, which is owned by her stepmother, while her stepsisters Isabelle and Sarah do nothing to help.
- Cindy and the Crystal Shoes — Cindy Reeves, a very talented young ballet dancer, is competing in secret for the Crystal Shoes Trophy and the chance of a scholarship to a famous ballet school. Cindy is an orphan and her guardian, Vi Burke, ill-treats her and forbids her to dance. But Cindy is helped by Mrs Webster, a friendly neighbour.
- Cindy's Magic Wand — Cindy Thrower slaves for a cruel uncle and aunt and spiteful cousins. She starts secretly training as a javelin thrower, but the lies she has to tell her nasty relatives in order to slip away to train start to catch up with her.
- Claire Loves Steve – but She Hates Elaine! — Claire Ramsay finds her new neighbour, Elaine Benson, a bossy sort and hates her. But she fancies Elaine's brother Steve and is trying to find a way to get him to notice her, including trying to do it through Elaine. This gets Claire into a lot of scrapes, such as dyeing her hair green to impress Steve – only to find he is colour blind, and all she does is get herself into trouble with her parents and headmaster. Matters come to a head when Elaine finds out about Claire fancying her brother and tries to use it blackmail Claire into helping her cheat at a test.
- Classmates — the life of pupils at Tower Hill Comp.
- Collector Katie — She's always collecting something.
- Copy Kate! – Kate Thomas feels that everybody except her has something they are good at. She starts copying more successful people — with hilarious results.
- Copycat! — Emma Marsden finds that her new stepsister Chrissie is a copycat and tags along wherever she goes. This is causing all sorts of problems.
- Crystal Ball — Humour strip about Crystal, a girl who can see into the future with her crystal ball.
- Cuddles — the adventures of a teddy called Cuddles.
- Cutting Edge — Amy Jackson is trying to get Cheryl Boyd sacked from the hair salon.
- Dad Must Never Know! — Sally Randall wants to be a show-jumper, but her father has banned ponies. Crippled show-jumper Ruth Hanbury has secretly trained Sally on her own pony, Storm. Sally is entering events under the name of "McAndrew" and competing in the Junior Championships. Then jealous Joyce Heath discovers that Sally is competing under a false name, which is grounds for disqualification. Sally has realised Joyce knows the truth but wonders why Joyce isn't letting on. She does not realise that Joyce is trying to figure out her motive for competing under a false name, which must be a serious one, before reporting her.
- Daughter of the House — When Sharon Welch's parents die, she finds there has been a mix up at the hospital, and now comes to live with her real parents, the Gowers. However, Janice Gower, the other mixed up baby, is convinced Sharon is trying to push her out.
- Deceived! — Diane Carlton makes the cardinal error of getting involved with her best friend Amy Davis’ boyfriend, Gary. Diane is now caught in a horrible two-timing trap. Can she find a way out of this mess before it destroys her friendship with Amy?
- Della Dolphin — Della Dolwyn does not win at anything like her sisters Helen (ballet) and Elaine (swimming) and receives constant put-downs because of this. Della resolves to win at something. She settles on synchro swimming and sets out to form a team in secret.
- Diana and the Doomstone — Diana Blake brings home a stone, and her sculptor father carves it into a bust. Diana starts feeling strange powers coming from the stone. Then she starts acting as if she is hypnotised and doing things that are completely out of character.
- Diana's Dark Secret — Diana Sefton is an excellent gymnast at Linwood School despite being completely blind. When she regains her sight after an accident, she keeps it a secret because she cannot bear to part with Goldie, her guide dog. But her conscience keeps niggling.
- Diary of Despair — Karen Kemp's older sister Donna runs away and ends up in a coma due to a road accident. Her diary reveals that pupils and staff at her school have been giving her a bad time. Karen sets out to take revenge on them.
- Dolly Bird — Dolly Bird and Carol Lane have been sent to Northend, Burchester, to run a Community House. Northend is a tough neighbourhood, but the girls manage to gain the friendship and trust of many Northenders.
- Door to Yesterday — Sally Dean is staying with her aunt for the holidays. Aunt Mabel is a housekeeper to a scientist Mr. Winslow. Sally follows Mr. Winslow through a door in his attic and finds herself lost and alone in London in 1851. Now she must track down Mr. Winslow and return home.
- Dorinda Doll of Doom — Debbie Soames receives a doll, Dorinda, and discovers that Dorinda can tell the future. This starts causing problems such as misconstruing Dorinda's prophecies. Debbie tries not to listen to Dorinda, but Dorinda's prophecies still cause trouble.
- Dottie and Her Dad — Humour strip with Dottie and her Dad.
- Double Take — Toni Dayley thinks that everything that happens to her is also happening to the Baileys.
- Double Trouble (1993) — Stephanie Jarvis has a curse put on her by Miss Troughton, an old lady who wrongly accused Stephanie of stealing from her. The curse causes an evil double to emerge when Stephanie sleeps, and Stephanie gets the blame for the trouble the double causes.
- Double Trouble — Mr Carter was stranded on a desert island for eleven years. When he returns his wife has died in a train crash and his baby daughter was given to Sunnydale Orphanage. He finds that two girls with red hair survived the crash and were raised in the orphanage. He has taken both girls Rose and Jenny, now 13, on holiday to try and figure out which one is his daughter.
- Driving into Danger — Sisters Julie and Jane Corby travel to South America to meet their dad, who's gone there for work. But, when he fails to show up at the airport, the sisters buy a dusty old car they name Joe, and set off to look for him. And they discover that Joe seems to have a mind of “his” own…
- Ellen of Elmwood Farm — Ellen Shaw has lived all her life in an orphanage until 1870, when she is sent to work on Elmwood Farm for Jonah Fleming and his sister Martha. When she arrives, it seems the Flemings are surprised, as they had requested a boy. Ellen hopes to prove she can work as hard as a boy so she can stay on the farm.
- Elsie's Elephant — Elsie Carter has a very unusual pet — a baby elephant named Hortense. And wherever Hortense goes, trouble follows!
- Emma's Umbrella — In 1900, Ivan's Umbrella Shop is renowned for his beautiful personalised umbrellas, with the owner's name inscribed on the handle. The last umbrella Ivan makes is inscribed with the name "Emma", after the daughter he and his wife never had. The umbrella passes through a succession of owners over time, and each time it does so, it changes their lives.
- Everyone's Perfect Mum — Kay Maxwell, star of TV soap "Garden Square", is the most popular personality in Britain as "everyone's perfect mum." Only her cruelly-treated stepdaughter knows what Kay is like in real life.
- Eye Spy Trouble — Kim Cartwright realises that her cousin Tricia Hudson, who has been living with the family since her parents’ deaths, is faking blindness to get anything she wants. Tricia is also playing dirty tricks to push Kim out and take her place in the family. But Kim cannot prove it because Tricia is too clever to be caught out. The situation reaches the point where the parents decide to send Kim to boarding school.
- Eyes for Mary – Mary Tremayne is going blind, and is training her dog, Shep, to be her guide. This is unheard of in Victorian times and Mary is meeting strong opposition.
- Fair Shares — The Watson family have always been hard up, but become rich when Mum wins big on the pools. The daughter Kathy, believing in "fair shares", is determined to share her good fortune with her friends. Unfortunately her generosity always seems to backfire and make her unpopular.
- Families at War! — The Carters and Simpsons have been bitter enemies since the day they became neighbours. Only the daughters, Polly Carter and Janet Simpson, are friends. The families get more friendly when Polly and Janet are chosen as queens for Carnival Week, but things are not going smoothly.
- Fast Fido — a computer dog comes to life!
- Father Must Go Free! — Set around 1746 two children help their father find freedom after being arrested by the Redcoats.
- Fay Fearless — Fay Fearless works as an agent for SOS, the code name for a secret Government organisation run by Arthur King, the millionaire owner of Paragon Stores.
- Film Star Nurse — TV star Amy Clark is mistaken for a nurse during an emergency because she is still wearing her nurse's uniform from the serial she stars in. This inspires her to give up her television career and start training as a real nurse.
- Framed! – Katie Knight feels lonely after her best friend Joanna Bland emigrates, but soon becomes friends with new girl Lisa Jones. Lisa says she and her mother look after animals of all descriptions and invites Katie and her dog Soda around for the weekend. But something very strange is going on — the walls of the house are lined with paintings of animals done by Mrs Jones, but no real animals are present...
- Fran's Four Friends — What's going to happen to the horses if the stables close down?
- Frankie from the Film — Karen finds an unusual boyfriend when Frankie a character from a movie comes alive. He can only stay around as long as the film is on though.
- Freda Who? — Freda arrives at Karen Wilkinson's house with a letter from her father saying she is a distant relative of the family and they are to take care of her until he returns. But Karen realises there is something strange about Freda; there are peculiar gaps in her knowledge, she says odd things, and she does not seem to understand everyday life.
- Friend of the Lonely — Susan Holmes helps lonely people.
- Gail's Guardian Angel — Gail Hayley has a companion that only she can see and hear – her guardian angel.
- Gateway To The Past — Cathy Brown meets a young girl called Emma Seymour, and travels back in time to 1910.
- Georgie, Go Home! — Georgie Hudson is orphaned and taken in by her Aunt Meg after a spell in a Children's Home. But her cousins, all boys, are not friendly because they mistakenly thought she would be a boy and do not welcome a girl. Their hostility gets worse when Georgie's arrival brings changes to the household that they do not like, such as Georgie unwittingly inspiring Aunt Meg to put them on a washing-up rota. The boys are soon causing trouble for Georgie and want her out. Georgie is trying to find a way to win them over, but isn't having much success.
- Gertie the Ghost-Hunter — Gertie Hill's grandfather is caretaker of the new building complex at Old Mallow. The redevelopment has disturbed the ghosts who haunt the square. Only Gertie can see and deal with them, with the aid of a strange hour-glass that belonged to her great-grandmother.
- Ghost Writer — Tina Baxter is hopeless at writing until she acquires a strange typewriter.
- Glenda the Guide — Girl Guide Glenda Gardner's attempts at winning badges always land her in the soup.
- Goldie and the Three Bears — When three live bears attach themselves to Goldie Lock, it begins an adventure which lands Goldie and her friend, Pat Howard, on the island of Sawaki. The Sawakians has a colony of these sacred bears. They believe that as long as the bears live, valuable osmium mines will continue. But their enemies, the Katolians, make a surprise attack and kill all the bears except Goldie's three, whom she and her friend manage to hide. Losing heart, the superstitious Sawakians surrender. Goldie is convinced that if they knew that some of the sacred bears were saved, the Sawakians would rise up again. But first a safer hiding place must be found for the bears.
- Got to Break Free! — Twins Amy and Lesley Carter get tired of people treating them exactly the same, right down to giving them identical birthday cards and presents. They set out for some individuality and hope people get the message and stop treating them identical just because they are twins.
- Green Fingers – Sarah Peters is a very selfish girl who never helps anyone, not even when it is an emergency. In an attempt to win prize money from a green issue project, she steals a cutting from an unusual plant — which turns out to be a very big mistake...
- Guinea-Pig Girl — Terry Lacey's father draws a comic strip about the adventures of a girl who is also called Terry. Terry helps Dad with his ideas, but doing so gets her into all sorts of scrapes.
- Gwen's Goats — As part of a publicity event, Gwen takes a herd of goats across country. The five goats are Gruff, Nanny, Gus, Gertie and Billy the Kid.
- Handmaid of the Sacred Cat - Heather Gray, a junior member of the Merewood Athletic Club is hoping to win the Young Athlete of the Year award. Then a strange cat named Sheba moves in with the family and makes life very difficult for Heather. Sheba, the last descendant of the Sacred Cats of Egypt, has chosen Heather as her handmaid – and Heather can’t refuse, as Sheba has mysterious powers to make people do what she wishes.
- Hands Off! — A crusade to save the Youth Club.
- Hannah and Herbie — Amnesic Hannah is trying to find her past.
- Happiness House — Laura Willoughby is determined to find out why Happiness House has become a jinxed cottage.
- Hard Hearted Harriet — Orphaned Harriet Bond is caring for her younger brothers and sisters in Victorian England. She discovers she has only months to live, so she must find homes for her charges. To make them want to leave her, she pretends to be hard and unloving.
- Hard Mercy — Mercy Green is stricken with a tropical fever and finds herself in an alternate London where life is hard and so are the people. This is because they are ruled and tyrannised by gangs of criminals known as "The Families" in a fascist jack-booted manner.
- Hateful Hattie — Hattie Taylor is despised by the other girls of a cruel orphanage because she curries favour with the staff to get preferential treatment. They are unaware that it is Hattie's cover for her other persona — "The Angel Ghost," a mysterious benefactor who helps alleviate their hard life.
- Hateful Heather — Sally Hill is an orphan living with her grandparents. She is an aspiring actress in her local drama school, and she auditions for the part of Heather Ross, a nasty character in a new television serial to be called The Ross Family. She wins the part, but her life takes a turn for the worse, as the people in town mistakenly believe that her personality in real life is the same as Heather's.
- Have I Been Here Before? — Diane Dawson and her family move into Parfitt Court. Diane begins to have disturbing dreams in which she relives the hard life of Meg Hardy, who had once worked as a kitchen maid at Parfitt Court. Worse, Diana finds that she seems to experience parallels to her dreams in real life, such as falling ill of a fever while she dreams that Meg does and is in danger of death.
- Hayley's Hidden Talent — Tina Marshall hopes that divorced Mr Todd will pop the question to her mother. Then Tina overhears Mr Todd's daughter Hayley saying something that sounds like she feels inferior to Tina and cannot live in her shadow. Fearing this will be a barrier to the proposal she hopes for, Tina tries to address it by finding something Hayley is good at. But her efforts keep going wrong.
- He's Not For You! — Martin's snobby sister disapproves of his girlfriend and tries to split them up. She even goes as far as having the family swimming pool wrecked and blaming the girl.
- Head of Hate! — Gemma Andrews makes fun of a museum statue of the Greek monster Medusa the Gorgon and pays the price. Afterwards Medusa's head keeps appearing to Gemma in reflective surfaces. Every time it does, Gemma turns spiteful and destructive and does not remember her behaviour afterwards. Eventually Gemma gets a translation of some words from the statue. It says that in order to break Medusa's power, something of hers must be destroyed. But Gemma does not know what the "something" is because the key word is missing.
- Heartache for Hannah — Hannah Littleton's father remarries and the marriage goes well until the stepmother, Jill, gives birth to Thomas. Jill becomes moody and temperamental and the marriage starts going downhill.
- Heartbreak School — Jo Sanders is sent to the Hartbrook boarding school, where she finds harsh teachers and an enemy in another student, named Paula.
- Her Cousin's Keeper — Lucy Shaw's rich uncle pays for her to attend Acton Hall Boarding School – but only on condition that she look after his daughter, Hilary. Lucy loves Acton hall but spoiled, wilful Hilary hates it and wants to get expelled. Lucy knows if that happens, she would have to leave too!
- Her Name in Lights — Stella Martin is living with her Aunt Cynthia, an unscrupulous theatre agent, while her mother is ill and her father works away from home. Stella is a talented actress and wants to go into the theatre. But Aunt Cynthia forces her into acting of a most undesirable kind – starring in TV commercials as a child actress. To this end Aunt Cynthia forces Stella into a childish appearance, deliberately underfeeds her to stunt her growth, keeps her away from school, and Stella has to do housework as well.
- Here Come the Mini-Mounties! — Joyce Ingram and Rona Parnell are two young policewomen, that join the Mounted Section of the Police Force.
- Here to Stay — A nightmare begins for the Walkers when visiting relatives come to stay. The visitors are soon taking over the house and coming up with devious ways to prolong their stay.
- Hide My Family — Karina Crosbie is determined that her new boyfriend, Dean Easson, will not meet her large, eccentric, chaotic family in case they put him off her.
- Hilary of the Happy Bus — Hilary Drew is the youngest member of the team in charge of Manchester's mobile playgroup, which is known as the Happy Bus.
- Hockey Hannah — The adventures of a schoolgirl, Hannah and her hockey stick. Sometimes her stick causes trouble, other times it's very useful.
- Home, Sweet Home — Claire Maxwell is caught in the middle of her separated parents.
- House Warning — Julie Wood and her family move into a large house in the country. Julie is bewildered when everyone at her new school avoids her for no apparent reason, and then things start going strangely wrong for the family in the house.
- I Can't Stand my Sister! — Jan and Chris can't stand each other — and now they find they're sisters!
- I Give Her a Year! — Janice Knight is spending all her time looking after her stepsister Lesley because she mistakenly thinks has less than a year to live. Lesley knows Janice's mistake and is taking advantage of it to get Janice's full attention.
- I Hate Boys! — Maria Atwell is fed up that her parents allow her twin brothers Alan and Jake more freedom than her, although they are little older than she is.
- I Hate You! — Unhappy at her new boarding school, Gail Jenkins writes to her parents begging them to return from abroad. A plane crash leaves Dad dead and Mum comatose. Gail blames herself because of the letter and her sister Sue turns against her for the same reason. The rift between the sisters becomes ever-wider as Gail's attempts to mend their relationship invariably go wrong.
- I Must Fall out with Mary! — Marsha Noble and her sister Mary have always been close. But when their parents head for a separation and think the girls will cope as they are so close, Marsha tries to fall out with Mary in the hope it will keep their parents together.
- I Must Find Little Ben - Two orphan siblings, Ben and Penny, escape from the orphanage, only for Ben to be abducted by a Fagan-like criminal, the Director. Now Penny has to find and rescue her brother before it's too late.
- I Should Have Stayed in Bed! — Humour with Jane, who always ends up wishing she had stayed in bed after what happens to her every week.
- I Want Him Back – Zoe Elder is determined to get her boyfriend back (completely ignoring the fact that he dumped her because of her horrible attitude) – and her methods are not very honourable.
- I-am-a-Robot! — Jackie Johnson pretends to be a humanoid robot, Shena (Simulated-Humanoid-Electro-Newtronic-Automation) to save her scientist father from ruin. "Shena" is designed to protect wealthy Daphne Richmond, but Daphne gets kidnapped. Meanwhile, Daphne's chauffeur Andrew discovers Jackie's secret, and then two "robots" attempt to rescue Daphne.
- I’ll Find a Friend! — Vicky Page and Pam Reid have always hated each other, but now they are both looking for a new friend as theirs have gone to another town. This leads to more animosity between them as each tries to outdo the other in finding a friend and even playing tricks to sabotage each other's efforts. As a result, neither of them is succeeding in finding a friend.
- I’ll Make Them Want Me! — Katie Carew lives in Cherrytree Home. She is determined to find a Mum and Dad, but she has a problem – she is a walking disaster area.
- I’ll Show My Brothers! — Samantha Brent is the only female in the household and does not shine at sport like her brothers. This has her brothers and father taking her for granted, expecting her to wait on them all the time, and sneering at her for not being at good sport like them. Fed up with this, Samantha starts to secretly train as a rhythmic gymnast and show her brothers she can be a sporting success too.
- I’ll Take Care of Tina! — Elaine Warnock and her father conspire to get Tina Marsden expelled from Fairfield Boarding School in the hope that he will grab Mr Marsden's job at the company they both work for and keep Elaine on at Fairfield. But just as they are about to succeed in getting Tina expelled, things begin to go wrong when Tina runs away and then returns secretly to the school to prove her innocence.
- In the Shadow of Shirley — Sandra Dexter is adopted by John and Mary Dickson. They just want Sandra to be happy, but Sandra thinks she has to prove she can be as good as their late daughter, Shirley, who was clever and talented. But Sandra's attempts to be as good as Shirley and step out from her shadow always go wrong and get her into trouble.
- Is He My Dad? — Kay Paxton's father crash-landed in Russia and was imprisoned for seven years. He has now returned, but Colonel McLintock of the British Secret Service has warned Kay that the man may be an imposter and Russian spy. She is to keep an eye on him and report anything unusual. Kay's spying has her not knowing one way or the other about the man claiming to be her father.
- It's a Dog's Life — Lisa Thornley is being blackmailed by nasty Vera Gibson, who is threatening to put her dog in the pound.
- It's a Dare! — Kay Harper, a junior reporter at the Mexfield Weekly News, runs a feature called "It's a Dare!". Readers are invited to send in unusual or interesting challenges for Kay, and each dare accepted wins £10.00 for the reader.
- It's My Turn Now! — When Jennie Weston's parents discovered her twin sister, Julia who was thought to have been drowned as a baby, was actually alive and had been brought up in a Children's Home, Jennie happily looked forward to sharing everything with her sister. But Julia seemed to have different ideas—she was out to grab all she could for herself—at Jennie's expense!
- Jackie and Jill (1976) — Jackie Jarvis was searching for her twin sister, Jill, the girls had been parted when they were adopted by separate families when they were babies. Jackie's only link to her twin was a silver Gemini medallion which seemed to have the strange power of making her dream about Jill.
- Jackie and Jill — The Paton twins had just moved to a new home in Bexley Park, about twenty miles from London. Jackie was a keen athlete, but Jill didn't care for sport at all although she was a natural athlete.
- Jade Jenkins’ Stall — Jade Jenkins runs a bring-and-buy stall. Many of her items have a story behind them, all concerned with why the seller did not want the item and brought it to the stall.
- Jenna on the Run — Jenna the gypsy girl is being trained in athletics by the blind Duchess.
- Jigsaw of Danger — Jill Jarvis has a family photograph turned into a jigsaw for her parents' anniversary. But when she accidentally breaks a vase belonging to a strange old woman, the woman puts a curse on the jigsaw. The curse causes anything that happens to a piece of the jigsaw with a relative on it to happen to that same relative. And the woman says it will stay that way until either the vase is whole again or an identical one is found.
- Jill and Jack — Jill Norris's parents breed Pekinese dogs, but although Jill likes dogs, she does not share their taste for Pekineses. Then Jill finds an injured, stray lurcher she names Jack, and once Jack recovers, Jill decides to train him for dog agility competitions. But Jack has an unruly side that have Jill's parents concerned.
- Johnnie Who? — Jonnie is really Princess Jonquil — the Sleeping Beauty!
- Jonny Comet — the Pop Star from Planet X — Jonny Comet comes to earth in search of his sister. Slim Fiddler realizes Jonny could have a great future as a pop-star and appoints himself as Jonny's manager. Slim's niece, Mona, helps to keep Jonny's identity secret.
- Judy's Joker — Judy Foster, an English orphan, goes to live with her relatives in the American state of Wyoming. The local people scoff at Judy because of her English ways, and even more so when she buys an odd-looking horse called Joker. Judy is sure that she and Joker can make her uncle's farm prosperous. Judy and Joker make a great team in turning the tables on Jackson, who is giving trouble because he wants no competition.
- Jumpers’ Journey — While escorting two valuable horses to Rome, young grooms Vicky Redman and Paula Page's plane is hijacked and taken to northern Greece. The passengers are safely transported to Athens, but there is no suitable transport for the horses. So the girls decide to stay with the horses and ride to Athens themselves. They have a difficult time when they encounter bandits, and also when the horses go missing.
- Jumping Jackie – Star on Skates — Canadian Jackie Jasper is a talented young ice skater whose lumberjack father, Red Jasper, had become a millionaire over night. Red is determined Jackie will become a world champion with the help of Arnold Gottlieb, an Olympic coach.
- Kim of the Canals — When Kim Barry's grandfather dies, her horrible Uncle Sam and cousin Laura move into her barge home, the "Northern Queen". They abuse Kim and treat her like a slave, but she puts up with it because of her love of swimming. She joins a swimming club and is determined to train at every opportunity.
- Lady Lucy — Lucy Lamford is determined not to be turned into a lady and starts leading a double life.
- Lanky Liz — Liz Dixon is always in trouble because of her clumsiness. She works for her mean Uncle Josh, owner of a travelling fair. Harry Brent, the coach of a local sports club, had seen Liz jump and suggests that she has the making of a champion. But her Uncle Josh refuses to let her join the club.
- Late Kate — She's always late for something.
- Let Me Be! — When Gaynor Wood's mother leaves home, her grans move into the street to help out. The trouble is, the two grans do not get along.
- Lily's Pink Drink — Lily Millar wants to get rid of her freckles, so she enlists the help of Professor Gudge. He makes different potions but they don't have the desired effect. They do have other temporary side effects, though, such as giving her super-strength.
- Linda All-Alone — While on holiday in Littlehaven, Linda Thornley discovers a cave that belonged to a hermit called Old Tabitha. There is a verse on the wall beside a skeleton that warns that anyone who disturbs the peace of Old Tabitha will receive her curse of loneliness. Linda cannot get the rhyme out of her head, and then wonders if it is coming true when things begin to go wrong for her and she becomes increasingly unpopular and friendless.
- Little Auntie Annie — On a farm in Kentucky, Annie Parker has ten orphaned nephews – all of whom are older than herself. The nephews are accustomed to being waited hand and foot by their mother and expect Annie to do the same. But Annie always gets her own way with the nephews in the end.
- Little Frankie — A girl replaces her mother in a stage comedy duo, while she is sick. She can't let anyone know that she is pretending to be her mother though.
- Little Horror! – Dianne Moore has fallen for Paul Peters, and in order to get him to notice her, she concentrates on his little brother Terry. But Terry is a horror, and his tricks always get Dianne into trouble.
- Little Lord Percival — Pauline Pratt finds a ventriloquist's dummy, Little Lord Percival, but discovers he is evil and causes a lot of trouble that she gets the blame for. Eventually she realises that Lord Percival is possessed by the spirit of Fred Vernon-Vaisley ("Vernon the Valet"), a ventriloquist with a difficult, quarrelsome personality. Vaisley's personality led to his "sad end" after a quarrel with a fellow performer, Mr Grantley, and now Lord Percival is out for revenge on Mr Grantley.
- Little Miss Busyfingers — It is the end of World War II. All the other evacuees have left the Larches, home to Misses Daphne and Edith Burntree. Vi (Violet) Lambeth has stayed on because the housekeeper, Mrs Porter, is kind to her. But then the Misses Burntree sack Mrs Porter and start using Vi as an unpaid servant. They also get rid of the piano Mrs Porter left Vi as a gift, so Vi has to find other ways of playing the piano. And Vi has to contend with bullies at school as well.
- Little Miss Icicle – Joanne Blake loses three loved ones in one week. She vows to freeze her heart into ice so it will never feel such pain again.
- Little Miss Twinkle-Toes — Tina Thomas, a superstitious girl, considers the tap-dancing shoes she acquires to be a lucky pair. She immediately takes up tap-dancing in exchange for a job there as her mother cannot afford classes. Snobby Avril Foster and Lindsey Young look down on Tina and are always causing trouble for her, but Tina believes her shoes are bringing her luck in keeping ahead of them.
- Little Phantom of the Opera — In Victorian times, Evie lives secretly in the old Opera House and keeps herself well hidden because she fears the workhouse if discovered. She discreetly helps out at the theatre and comes to the aid of performers with problems. This starts rumours of a friendly ghost in the Opera House.
- Little Stranger — Clare is shocked to wake up one morning to find a young girl in her house that everyone claims is her sister, Darla.
- Living with Laura — Cathy Scott goes to live with her older sister Laura and her husband after their parents are killed. But Cathy has problems living with Laura.
- Lizzie's Lot — Lizzie Simpson and her parents run a donkey sanctuary. Mr Jeffries, the man who owns the land, is an unpleasant character who threatens the sanctuary with closure.
- Lonely — Anna Jackson is looking after badgers.
- Lonely - the Dog from Nowhere - Lonely is a stray dog looking for a loving owner and a good home.
- Looking after Lofty — It is 1940 and World War II. Jenny Booth's dog Lofty is wrongly accused of attacking sheep. Jenny is trying to get him to London and the safety of her grandfather's house.
- Love Thy Neighbour! — The Greys and Browns live next door and are constantly arguing because of their different interests. Two of their children, Brian and Carol do get along and decide to try to bring their families together.
- Lucknow Lucy — In 1857 in India, the British governor's residency at Lucknow is besieged by native soldiers. Among the people trapped in the grounds are the girls of Miss Phillimore's school for soldier's daughters.
- Lucky – Adventures of Lucky the cat, as told by Lucky himself.
- Lucy's Loving Cake — Lucy Davis makes a cake from bewitching flour and whoever eats a slice from it becomes extra "loving" — at least, for a time.
- Lucy's Locket — Lucy Lane is given a locket by her Great-Aunt Jane for her 13th birthday. Then Aunt Jane sends a letter saying that the locket belonged to someone who may have dabbled in witchcraft, and any object put in it will cause its owner to have bad luck. Aunt Jane says she does not believe it, but Lucy is not so sure after seeing what happened when she put a photograph of her boyfriend in it.
- Malice in Wonderland — an amusement park turns into a nightmare for Becky Shaw.
- Mandy
- Margie in the Middle — Margie Heath is tired of being "the middle one" and being called dull and stupid because she does not shine like her sisters Babette (ballet) and Irene (piano). Grandma Heath encourages Margie's talent for painting huge pictures, but her family does not understand.
- Marigold and the Three Bears — Marigold Shaw has lived in a Children's Home until she is offered a foster home after she saves the daughter from an accident. Marigold is very happy until she wins three teddy bears at a fair. She soon finds that anything that happens to one of the teddy bears happens to the corresponding member of the household.
- Marvel Mouser! — Diane Whittington is trying to find a Saturday job and befriends a cat. At first the cat seems lazy, but when he shows an incredible talent for catching mice, Fiddlem's Department store hires Diane and her cat – now named Mouser – as a pest control service.
- Mary – Maid of All Work — In 1898, Mary Morris has a tough time work-wise because her small size is against her. When she does find work she gets the toughest jobs with hard employers.
- Mary and Her Marvellous Machine — In the early 19th century, Mary Elliot lives with her widowed father. Mr Elliot invents a machine he hopes will make them a fortune – one of the first sewing machines. Mary sets out to sell this "marvel" machine, but meets with many difficulties through fear and ignorance.
- Mary's Mini Mum — an accident with a chemical formula makes Mrs Myers shrink whenever she gets hot.
- Mary's Moneybank – Mary Lyall is a spendthrift until she is given a manikin moneybank which seems to have a weird effect on her whenever she puts money into it.
- Maxie's Taxi — Kate Baxter takes over her dad's taxi business when he is injured. She is being helped by Maxie, a cat with strange powers that appeared out of nowhere.
- Meg Among the Slaves – Meg Jackson is an apprentice seamstress at Hamble's. While Hamble is away, the manager and his sister, the Joneses, ill-treat the apprentices, especially Meg. Meg runs away, but comes back when she learns that the Joneses are cheating Mr Hamble. Can she unmask them?
- Melinda, You're a Marvel — Tilly Parkin works for Comet Cosmetics, a vast cosmetics firm owned by her aunt. Tilly has been given the job of travelling the globe and checking on the firm's international agencies accompanied by her aunt's personal assistant Melinda — a woman who appears to be capable of ANYTHING.
- Mighty Minnie — Minnie Biggs is a tennis ace who supports herself and her grandfather by travelling the country on her bike and competing in competitions for money.
- Mini-Mum! — Pat Purdy has big problems after her Mum gets shrunk down to doll size by a weird washing powder, invented by Jeff Watson, the boy next door.
- Misfit Margo — When Margo Ashley's adoptive parents die, she goes to live with her birth parents. But she is not fitting into her new home and her siblings think she is a snob.
- Miss Busy-Fingers — Sally Best does not have a happy home life with her aunt and uncle. She turns to sewing and other craft skills to make secret earnings.
- Mollie the Music Maker — In the 1930s, the Mackies live in the rough Australian mining town of Kallora. The family are poor but Mollie, the eldest, tries to help out her widowed mother by doing odd jobs to earn money. Mollie is a talented musician and has taught herself to read sheet music. The miners of the town help out first by getting her an old piano and then funding her studies.
- Mona's Monkey — Mona Harding helps her parents run their farm with the help of her mischievous pet monkey Tiko.
- Money Matters — Linsey Townsend has lived a luxurious life and been spoiled. But all that changes when her father runs off with money from his employers’ company and the family bank. Linsey now faces a tougher financial time and learns hard lessons in being more appreciative, helpful and thoughtful. Meanwhile, her mother tries to conceal the truth about Dad's absence from their friends, keep up appearances, and dreads their secret being found out.
- Mrs Nobody — The four Carson sisters – Wendy, Joan, Lucy and Beth – have been in a Children's Home for years because nobody would agree to take all four of them. Then Mrs Niberdy agrees to foster them all. But when the sisters arrive at their new home, a mystery begins because the house is creepy and neglected-looking. The mystery deepens even more when the girls find Mrs Niberdy is nowhere in sight – just a note saying she has gone away – and nobody but themselves seems to be there. So they dub Mrs Niberdy "Mrs Nobody". They stay on in the house anyway because they do not want to go back to the Home, and pretend Mrs Nobody is there. But strange things start happening which suggest Mrs Nobody may not be as absent as she seems.
- Mum and Mr Harding — Lucy Pearson is trying to find a way to get her mother to marry Mr Harding, her new headmaster and next door neighbour – despite the fact that Mr Harding is an over-strict headmaster whose conduct and rules antagonise teachers and pupils alike, and Mrs Pearson as well.
- Mum Can't Cope! — When Gail Benson's father leaves home, her mother goes to pieces. Afraid the family might be split up, Gail decides to take charge of things, while keeping up a pretense to the outside world that her mother is coping.
- Mum's Bargains — Susie Carter's mum cannot resist a bargain, and it's usually up to Susie to sort out the bother that comes with the bargains.
- Mums Go Home! — Rona Hollister's gran wants Rona's widowed father to remarry so she can have a new mother. But Rona does not want a new mother.
- My Awful Sister! — Robyn West has a happy life with her kind well-off parents, who adopted her when she was very young. Then cruel spiteful Kate Baker, a new girl at school, discovers they are sisters who were separated as babies. Robyn fears Kate will tell the Wests she is one of the family.
- My Best Friend? — Next door neighbours Gwen Hammond and Jane Morris have been friends ever since they can remember. But their friendship is threatened when they start at Vale Park Seniors School and are put in different houses, which has them competing against each other.
- My Bionic Budgie! — When Kim Norton's budgie, Beakie, is injured by a cat, he's repaired at a Government Research Station and given bionic parts.
- My Cousin Quacker — A witch turns Kate into a duck in retaliation for an insult. High jinks ensue as Cousin Sally and her friend track down the witch to remove the spell.
- My Dad Next Door – Karen Walton pretends the dashing next-door neighbour is her father because she thinks her own is boring.
- My Grans Next Door — Karen Kemp's grandmothers live on either side of her. The grans have very different ideas about things and this causes a lot of arguing, with the Kemps caught in the middle.
- My Pony Next Door — Jenny West is forced to sell her pony Jester to her new neighbour, Willa Trent, so her dad can pay off his debts. But then Jenny discovers Willa is an unfit owner for Jester.
- My Secret Family — Janet Knight overhears Nurse Camp relieving her guilty conscience about accidentally switching two babies at birth and was too terrified to report it because she feared the dragon Sister. She gives a written confession to her mother before leaving on missionary work, who advises her to keep quiet. Janet realises she is one of the switched babies and Sally West is the other one. Fearing the heartbreak that speaking out would cause, Janet tries to discreetly get closer to her real family, but it always goes wrong.
- My Team's the Best! — Megan Davis and Tessa Giles have been friends for years and both kept their ponies at the same stables. Then both girls are picked for the pony club horse trials teams – but each for a different team. Only the best team will compete at the arena competition. The girls promise this won't affect their friendship — but it is proving hard not to get competitive.
- Mystery Boy – Jo Evans and Carol Smart are intrigued by John Smith, a new boy in their class. He is so secretive that nobody is sure he is even using his real name. Jo and Carol begin to investigate.
- Neil Next Door — Lisa Norton is delighted when her boyfriend, Neil Radley, moves in next door. But then she finds this is causing problems.
- Netta’s Newshound - Netta Norris works as a reporter for the Stickleford Gazette, a small country newspaper run by her Uncle George. She is aided in her work by Sam, the office dog - unbeknownst to anyone except Netta, however, Sam is actually Sam Bates, a former ace newsman, who has been turned into a dog after an unfortunate incident with an alien spaceship.
- New Pupil — There's a new pupil in Pamela Burton's class – Her Mum! Mrs Burton has decided to restart her education. Although proud of her mother, Pamela is finding Mum's presence at school can cause problems.
- Night and Day — Karen Day's mother has an evening job and now her father has been forced to change to the night shift, leaving the Day children on their own in the evenings. Dawn, the eldest, is supposed to be in charge, but is unsuited for the job because she is scatterbrained and this causes things to go wrong. Karen takes the blame because she does not want her parents to worry about Dawn's incompetence, but this keeps getting her into trouble with them.
- No Boy for Becky — Becky Howard buys a pair of figurines, Pierrot and Pierette, but accidentally breaks Pierrot. Since then, she has lost one boyfriend after another and becomes convinced it is Pierette's revenge on her.
- No Dogs Allowed! — Mary Nelson is a wheelchair user and lives with her mother on the 14th floor of a block of flats. The Caretaker Mr Henry has a strict "no dogs allowed" policy, but when Mary finds a stray dog she smuggles him into the flat. There are two strange men that are intent on taking the dog for some unknown reason.
- No Friends for Freda — Freda Wilson accidentally falls foul of an old gypsy woman, who tells her from than on she will bring only harm to her friends. The curse seems to be working and Freda feels she has to avoid her friends, for their own sake.
- No Girls Allowed — When Andy Ellis is taken ill and told not to play his cornet for three months, his twin sister, Kate, secretly takes his place in the Barfield Boys’ Brass Band.
- No Joy for Jenny: Jenny Selby is overjoyed when her brother John returns after being considered lost on a climbing expedition in the Himalayas. Then she begins to suspect the man is an impostor who is after the money John is set to inherit on his 21st birthday.
- No Love for Linda — Linda King tours clubs and theatres with her parents, King and Queenie. They abuse her and do not allow her to express her talent for singing or mix with other people. Linda begins to suspect there is some mystery about her past when she recognises a house in Hanworth as her old home. The mystery deepens when Linda discovers her family records and finds that "Linda" is nearly eighteen, but she is only thirteen.
- No Pity for Paula — Crippled Paula Travis is being forced to beg for her cruel relatives — who are very far from poverty-stricken.
- No Room for Rosie — Rosie Palmer's father is made redundant and the family buys a guest house. This causes difficulties for Rosie, including sharing the house with strangers.
- Nobody Knows My Face! — Millie Mason is a budding actress with dreams of becoming a star. It seems she's on her way to fame when she gets spotted by an agent, Eddie Tanner. Unfortunately every role she gets cast in she ends up in a costume, mask or in the shadows, so nobody sees what she looks like. Her agent also thinks keeping the mystery of what she looks like will make her an even bigger star, with a big reveal.
- Nola Knows — On her thirteenth birthday, Nola Handley inherits The Sight (ability to see into the future). This brings her only trouble, and the only way to get rid of The Sight is not to act upon the things she foresees for thirteen days.
- Nora's Ark — Nora Carrie and her dog Skipper go out on a trip with Granddad aboard his boat, "Ark". It turns into a nightmare when tsunamis strike and cast the Ark adrift. Worse, Granddad is taken ill, so it's up to the inexperienced Nora to navigate the Ark.
- Not a Clue! — Wendy Watson works for Sheldrake Homes (a parody of Sherlock Holmes). She is the one who ends up solving the mysteries and getting Homes out of scrapes he gets himself into.
- Not Miss Norman — Jenni Taylor is horrified when her widower dad starts dating her form teacher, Miss Norman. Jenni is determined to split them up.
- Not My Sister — After their parents split up, Kelley King stays with her father while her sister Claire goes abroad with the mother. Then Claire comes back to live with Kelley, Dad and his new wife. But Claire has been nasty to Kelley ever since her return and is poisoning her friends against her.
- Not Our Dad! — After being made redundant, Mr Beck converts the attic into an office. His daughters Tessa and Julie overhear things and begin to think their father is planning to rob a bank.
- Number One Mum — Lisa Murray's mother becomes a pop star. But the demands of her new career are not leaving her much time for Lisa.
- Nurses — Soap opera concerning four first-year student nurses (Verity, Amanda, Jackie and Kay) at Norchester General Hospital. The girls return in later series.
- Odd Girl Out — Julie Peters looks set for a dull summer holiday – until a boy moves in.
- Olga the Trapped One — Olga is an orphan who earns a meagre living from singing and dancing around the countryside. She is taken in by the Dent family who promised a fine future, but they just want her as a slave and keep her prisoner.
- Once Upon a Rhyme — Classic rhymes retold by a fairy.
- Our Baby Brother — When Jenny Randall's father marries Ruth King's mother, the marriage goes smoothly until baby Ian arrives. Ruth is sometimes jealous of the baby, and when Jenny tries to cover up, she makes trouble for herself.
- Our Fairy Godmother! — The Gregg children adopt a grandmother, Mrs Goodheart. They are in for a big surprise when they find Mrs Goodheart is a real fairy godmother.
- Our Very Own Princess! — Zelda Smith works with her cruel uncle and aunt in a fake mind-reading act and is billed as Princess Zelda. She runs away and is befriended by some urchins who take her for a real princess. She maintains the pretence to keep herself in hiding.
- Pam of Pet Parade — Pam Bruce is keeping animals in secret to save them from being put down.
- Parents Wanted! — The Jonson children advertise for foster parents when their parents' marriage fails and the mother is hospitalised with a nervous breakdown. There are plenty of replies, but none of the applicants seem to work out.
- Pat the Peacemaker — Pat Summers can solve others problems but not her own — a stepmother who hates her.
- Patti Must Paint — Patti Charlton is a talented artist and wants to go to art school. But when her unscrupulous Uncle Sid adopts her to look after his motherless twins, he forbids her to paint, so she has to find ways of getting to art school in secret. She also has to contend with bullying at school, especially with spiteful Alice.
- Paula's Pictures — Paula Johnstone lives with her widowed invalid mother. A clever artist, Paula is using her painting skill in order to earn enough money to send her mother on a holiday — but Mrs. Johnstone is more concerned that Paula should do well at school, so Paula has to keep it a secret.
- Penny and the Portrait — Penny Fairfax has lived in a children's home until she goes to live with distant relatives. Penny unearths a portrait of a girl who looks just like her. The portrait is of Miranda Fairfax, an ancestress who was burned as a witch. Now Miranda is exerting an evil power over Penny to wreak revenge on the descendants of the people who burned her.
- Perri – Rosanna Lee's father gives up the gipsy life and becomes a farmhand. But Rosanna finds herself bullied at school and her only friend is a fawn called Perri. But Perri has to be kept hidden.
- Picture-Book Polly — Polly is an avid reader of the girls' comic "Candy". Polly's attempts to copy the antics of the characters in Candy always ends in disaster, but she finally learns it is better to be herself.
- Pine Tree Grove — the story of a TV soap.
- Pippa's Paper Round — Adventures with Pippa Roberts as she goes on her early morning paper round.
- Polly's Perfect Mum — Polly Gordon persuades her slapdash, happy-go-lucky mother to enter a "Perfect Mum" contest, only to regret it. When Mrs Gordon wins, life becomes difficult for the rest of the family as not only is Mrs. Gordon determined to live up to her new title, but she becomes determined to turn them into the "perfect" family.
- Poor Little Rich Girl — Cherry Chipchase is daughter of millionaire Samuel Chipchase. Cherry is spoiled and selfish, so in an effort to reform her, Dad sends her to the roughest school in town where she is expected to do Saturday Duty, and stops her allowance.
- Princess from the Past — Twins Toni and Tessa Taylor are devoted sisters but different in character; Toni is boisterous and mischievous while Tessa is quiet and thoughtful. At an exhibition on Ancient Egypt, the twins hear about twin princesses who were also different in character; one kind and one evil. The evil twin poisoned the kind twin, assumed the throne, and her reign was a cruel one. After Tessa gets a strange shock from a goblet that the evil sister may have used to poison the kind one, Toni starts acting evil towards her.
- Princess of the Sun - While on an expedition to the east, Professor Ross finds and adopts a baby girl, naming her Linda. Fourteen years later, Linda is revealed to be was a princess and heir to the throne of the eastern state of Kurata.
- Queen of the Caves — While on a trip to some caves, Miss Todd, a teacher and Molly, a pupil, discover a world of Stone Age people. They also find Professor Cronk, an old teacher of Miss Todds’, who disappeared 15 years ago. Molly Jackson is hailed as their Queen because her hockey stick resembles the crooked club — a symbol of tribal leadership.
- Rachel and the Weather People — Rachel Talbot buys an old weather-house in a junk shop and finds it is magical; moving the figures in and out of the house can change the weather.
- Remember – You're My Sister! — Rose Carlton was adopted at the age of four and has a comfortable life with her adopted parents. But Rose wishes she could find her sister, who had gone with relatives when the natural parents died and they could not take Rose as well. When sneaky Iris Smith finds out, she pretends to be that lost sister to take advantage of Rose and the good life she has.
- Revenge! — Alison blames her sister Emma for her injured leg because Emma innocently asked Alison to switch places with her in the car moments before it crashed. So Alison secretly causes trouble for Emma.
- Rhona's Rescue – Rhona Anderson sets up a rescue for sick animals.
- Rita — Rita Barraclough is determined to break a record at any cost.
- Roll-along Roma — the story of a roller skater.
- Rosa's New Friend — there is something strange about Rosa Mason's new friend who appears to be her guardian angel.
- Rose Among The Thorns — Rose is delighted when her new foster family the Thorns want to adopt her. However, a fellow student makes her worry that the family's happy-go-lucky way of life might not be favorable with the adoption authorities. She tries to fix this but ends up making things worse.
- Rose and Mary — Rose Kemp, adopted as a baby, has always wanted a sister. It comes true when she discovers her twin sister Mary was stolen as a baby, and now Mary has come to live with her. But Mary's upbringing with the people who stole her has made her rough, bad-mannered and very difficult to get along with.
- Rosie of the Iron Road — When a rival railway company lays claim to a stretch of land over which Rosie Dickson and her friends are laying a track, things get violent. When Rosie's track is completed first, the rival company stages a crash, and Rosie is badly injured while saving lives.
- Sally – the Slave-Girl Star — Sally Binks is always falling asleep in class because she is forced to work early in the morning and late at night at her stepmother's laundry. The headmistress and deputy headmistress don't act because they dislike Sally. But Sally has ambitions to go on stage and begins to make headway in that area.
- Sally and the Sinister Sisters — Sally James’ grandfather buys a set of dolls that belonged to a Victorian witch. He is trying to mend them so as to make enough money to repair his shop. Sally is making new dresses for the dolls, but is finding that each doll is taking over her mind, which causes a lot of trouble for her.
- Sally's Secret — Linda Brown moves house and makes friends with the girl next door, Sally Smart. Then Linda discovers there is a mystery about Sally and her family.
- Sandi's Secret Services — Sandi Peters lives with her Aunt Madge, Uncle George, and cousins Bridget and Clara. She is an unpaid servant who is expected to wait on her lazy uncle and spoiled cousins, and slave as a seamstress for her aunt's clothes business, which the aunt does not run honestly. Sandi discovers a passion for table tennis, but has to find ways to get away from the work her guardians lumber her with in order to practise and compete in secret. This is not always easy.
- Sara's Secret Garden — Sara Stanford can't handle living with a noisy family, until she finds a neglected garden.
- Sarah's Secret — After a run of bad luck with foster homes, Sarah Roberts finally gets lucky with the Taylors. She discovers that Sharon James next door is her long-lost sister. But Sarah does not want to share her foster parents with Sharon and plays tricks to stop them getting to know her.
- Saucepan Cindy — Cindy works in her father's cafe washing dishes but she wants to be able to cook. Her attempts usually turn out disastrous though!
- School of Secrets — Sara Briggs goes to Offshore Island, a school for children from broken homes. It is run by the sinister Miss Macey and Mr Briggs is giving Miss Macey the money for it. But Sara is getting suspicious as the pupils behave very strangely. They march like puppets and emerge from accidents without a flinch or hint of pain. Then Sara discovers that Miss Macey has a very strange treatment for her pupils and has a "great plan".
- Seal Girl — Jake and Ruby Walters run a successful show with performing seals. When they visit a remote island in Scotland they find a girl who has been raised by seals. They call her Shona, pass her off as their niece and incorporate her into their show, planning to make a fortune. But Shona begins to learn human ways too fast, which threatens their plans, and Cherry, the other girl in the show, is jealous of Shona.
- Second Fiddle to Sorcha — Maxine Winters is a gifted but arrogant violinist. Then Sorcha, a mysterious gypsy girl, shows up, and Maxine gets jealous when she finds that Sorcha is a far better violinist than her.
- Second Hand Sal — Sal Edwards has to keep the fact that her mother is now running a used clothes stall secret from her friends.
- Secret Star! – when pop star Jeff Collins loses his voice, his twin sister Jodie agrees to secretly take his place until he recovers.
- Selfish Susan — Susan Smith has been temporarily deaf after an illness. When her hearing returns, she keeps it a secret so as to continue getting preferential treatment.
- Shadow of the Ice-Palace — Susan Taylor wins the leading part in a new ice-ballet. But strange, frightening incidents begin to happen and they are accompanied by the appearance of a cloaked, masked figure who can also hypnotise Susan.
- Share and Share Alike! — Sheila and Sharon Terry are twins that are constantly fighting, much to the exasperation of their parents. They don't like to see each other get what they think is favouritism. Their parents tell them from now on everything will be shared and they will get treated exactly the same. The twins are delighted and finally agree that this is what they always wanted, but they are soon to realise it's not as great as they initially thought.
- Sharing Starlight — Cousins Patti Mills and Sarah Blake inherit a pony, Starlight. Unfortunately the cousins hate each other due to a family feud, and poor Starlight is caught in the middle.
- She Shall Have Music - Morna Richards is very fond of music, and is delighted when a strange old woman gives her a lute. While playing the lute, Morna and a friend see a flash of lightning and are mysteriously transported into medieval times. When they return to modern times, the lute changes into a fiddle, and from that moment on, Morna is randomly transported to different time periods.
- She's My Friend! — When Sarah Warner and Jane Mills start secondary school, Sarah is afraid their long friendship will be lost if Jane makes new friends and becomes more involved in different activities.
- Shed No Tears for Tammy – Cindy Brown learns that her friend Tammy North has a fatal illness.
- Sheila and Susie the Taylor Twins — Sheila and Susie Taylor were twins—alike in looks, but very different in every other way. Sheila was quiet, while Susie was reckless.
- Simon – Three-year-old Simon is having strange, destructive fits, and Tania is getting the blame for everything he does.
- Sing for Your Supper! — In 1860, orphans Hannah and Oliver Franklin come to London to find their Uncle George, but find he is deceased. Silas Grodget, a theatrical agent, finds Hannah a job on stage and she becomes a popular singer. But Grodget is an unscrupulous man who intends to make a profit out of Hannah.
- Sisters in Secret — Jackie Munroe and Alison Brown are half-sisters, but the trouble is, their mothers hate each other.
- Skeleton Corner — Spooky stories told a skeleton. Since the storyteller was a skeleton, his stories often had an edge to them, similar to Misty.
- Skin Deep – Nadine Andrews is a vain girl who infuriates everyone with her conceit. But an encounter with an elderly fortune teller while on holiday may change all that.
- Slave of the Top Twenty — Andrina Faye is Britain's top girl pop star and her records all hit the Top Twenty. But this is because Mr Faye is blackmailing Jill Summers into using her voice for the recordings by threatening to get Mr Summers sent to prison for embezzling. Then Jill discovers that Mr Faye framed her father.
- Slave to Love! — Gail Somers gets a crush on a boy named Justin. Justin has a horrible lazy sister, Andrea, who decides to take advantage of Gail's crush. She makes a deal to get Gail and Justin together if Gail becomes her slave for a month and a day.
- Slave to the Space Princess — Karen Smith believes she has been enslaved by Princess Zita, an evil space princess she saw in a movie that over-impressed her. But in fact she is being taken advantage of by Brenda Marks, who has run away from a rough home and bears a strong resemblance to Zita.
- Slaves of the Mill – Jane March works in a horrible mill, but does her best to make life easier for the others. But there is a secret in Jane's past, and once the overseer suspects it, Jane's life is in danger.
- Sleeping Beauty from the Stars – Banished to the penal Planet Peutridd because of her mischievous ways, an alien beauty queen instead lands on Earth, and is awakened from deep sleep by a kiss. She becomes a model, "Stella Saturn", but danger looms when her home planet, Xerox, discovers her whereabouts.
- Smash-Hit Cindy — Cindy Burnett wants to be a tennis champion but she lives with her grandmother who cannot afford to pay for tennis fees and equipment. When Cindy saves a baby's life, the grateful parents pay her membership for the exclusive Sterling Club. Of course there are some people who don't want her in the club.
- Snow White and the Seventh Dwarf — Sara White is nicknamed Snow White by her father. She finds one of the garden gnomes is actually the youngest of the Seven Dwarfs. His name is Grem, and he has been disowned by the other dwarfs for running off with a gang of naughty elves and then turned into stone by a witch for playing tricks. The name of Snow White was needed to break the spell, and now that has happened, Sara is trying to help Grem reform so his brothers will forgive him. But Grem's efforts don't seem to go right.
- Soap Suds — Sally Gibson is exasperated with her relatives who copy everything they see on a TV soap to ridiculous lengths.
- Sorry, Sue — After mistreating foster-girl Sue Grant, Janie Clarke now regrets her actions, but she cannot convince Sue of her good faith — especially since her efforts always end in disaster.
- Space Dog U2 – Robot dog U2 escapes from a starship during an exploration of Earth. He takes a liking to an earthgirl and ignores the starship orders to return.
- Stage School — Nicky Carr is accepted into an exclusive stage school, but is peeved that conceited Gavin Mellor has been accepted as well.
- Stella Starr — Stella Starr is an alien that usually gets into some trouble while adjusting to earth life. Luckily in the end, her powers usually helps the situation.
- Strange Neighbours — Tracy Wilson is puzzled with her neighbours.
- Sue and Snowy — Orphan Susan Saunders goes to live with her Uncle Jack and Aunt Ella. Although they are kind, Susan finds life with them very different from what she is used to because Uncle Jack works as a scrap dealer. Susan finds solace in Snowy, the pony that lives there. Snowy has been trained differently to other ponies and Uncle Jack is doubtful about Sue managing her, but he decides to give her a chance.
- Sue and the Simple Life — Sue Bartlett's father decides to go "The Good Life" way and live a life of self-sufficiency. But this does not always make Sue popular with her friends.
- Summer of Fear — Is Treetops Boarding School haunted?
- Susan of Studio B - Klutzy Susan is working as a production assistant at “ICT” Studios. The production has been plagued by bad luck and minor accidents, and it's up to Susan to solve the mystery.
- Susan's Secret — Twelve-year-old Susan Riley and her family have just moved to a new town. When Susan was younger her parents were part of a travelling fair, so she didn't get much schooling. They decided to settle down so their children could get a proper education, but then Susan fell ill for years. So even though she is no longer ill, she never learned to read and write. She wants to keep this a secret from her new friends, and knows she won't be able to hide it school, but in the meantime she wants to enjoy the Summer holidays.
- Sweet Charity – She Leads a Double Life! — Charity Black pretends to be crippled to take advantage of people.
- Sweet Sue — Little Sue Lister wins the title of "Little Miss Loveliness" and is now in great demand to appear at public functions. Only Sue's sister Karen knows that sweet-looking Sue is in fact a crafty schemer and troublemaker and when she puts on her sweet smile, it means big trouble.
- Swim, Sally – Swim! — Sally King has been brought up in Silverdale Orphanage, where she helps look after the younger children. She is a keen swimmer and wants to become a world championship. The assistant Matron finds Sally a coach in the form of ex-army sergeant, Carol Cannon, whose training methods are tough going!
- Swinging Sue — Sue Carter works in the publicity and advertising department of a large London store, Clarrod and Sembridge. She earns the nickname Swinging Sue as she is always so full of life.
- Taking Tara's Place — strange things start happening when Beth Maynard is fostered in the wake of the death of Tara.
- Teacher's Pet? — New girl Joanne Webster is branded teacher's pet because the girls have wrongly assumed a new teacher is her father.
- Teddy — Sarah Hutton is spoiled and selfish. At a Halloween party she mocks a witch, and the witch retaliates by putting a spell on her old teddy bear. Teddy comes to life, and starts making Sarah's life a misery because of the way she used to treat him.
- Terry and her Trike — Terry Ward has a bicycle of her own — an old-fashioned trike.
- Terry and Her Trumpet — Orphan Terry Thompson lives with her brother Gerald and sister-in-law Frances who are cruel to her and make her slave in their cafe, which leaves her too tired for homework. Terry discovers she has a talent for the trumpet, but when her mean relatives won't let her play, she tries to find ways to practise her trumpet in secret.
- Terry's Troll — Terry Clarke and her friendly, cheeky troll.
- Tessa Goes to Town — Tessa Mercer's mother abandons their farm in favour of the town life, causing separation between the parents.
- That Bad Bettina! – The Carrs foster Bettina Dickson, who was once accused of shoplifting. But their daughter, Susie, resents Bettina and is trying to get rid of her – even going as far as to start a fire in her own bedroom.
- That Girl Next Door — Twelve-year-old Jennifer Jack is the most popular girl in the neighborhood because she has a sunny personality and is well known for her helpfulness, kindness and cheeriness. Then Freda Lindsay, the surly, unpleasant and selfish antithesis of Jennifer, moves next door and develops a hatred for Jennifer, going out of her way to make her life a misery.
- That Girl's Me! — Margie is a nice girl but a bit of an underachiever. For a school project about local superstitions and legends, she researches a legend of Old Mother Wily a witch and goes to the ruins of her cottage, where she finds the magic book which releases her other self — the Hyde to her Jekyll, the part of her that dares to do what Margie won't. Her double starts taking Margie's place and making trouble, which Margie gets the blame for.
- That's My Girl! — Kate Masters’ father, a famous scientist, goes on the run after being wrongly accused of espionage. Kate promises her father that she will continue her skating, but it is not proving easy, and he has to find ways to secretly help her while evading the police.
- The Barn — Beth Braden and her parents move to the countryside when Dad gets a job on an estate with Mr Horden. Beth comes across an old barn and immediately likes it for its character and historical feel. She is dismayed to hear Horden is planning to develop the area for a luxury villa, which would demolish her beloved barn. After befriending a boy named Luke Daniels and helping him tend to an injured barn owl, they try get the barn owl to settle in the barn so they can get it protected.
- The Bird of Happiness — Susan Manners feels miserable with her lot. Her family can't afford much so she often feels left out, Mum is sick, Dad is worn out because he is forced to work too hard, and she feels lumbered with the kids and has no friends. She wishes for some happiness, and then the Bird of Happiness appears. It comes from the Land of Ssenippah, the land where dreams come true and everyone there has a Bird of Happiness. Susan travels with the Bird of Happiness into Ssenippah to find happiness. She has a lot of amazing adventures but finds true happiness eluding her.
- The Cat with 7 Toes — Orphan Jenny Potter takes Twinkle, a stray kitten, into her uncle's home at Lynhoe. Unfortunately Twinkle has seven toes on each paw (a polydactyl cat), so the superstitious villagers think he is descended from the legendary seven-toed cats of the witches of Lynhoe. They start persecuting Twinkle and blame any bad luck on him. Their hostility drives Jenny to run away with Twinkle.
- The Children Came Too! — When Jenny Smith's father falls ill while abroad, Mrs. Smith flies out to look after him, leaving the children in the care of their Aunt Ivy. Jenny is a keen athlete but finds it hard to train properly as Ivy refuses to look after the children when Jenny is not at school. So Jenny ends up having to take her younger siblings to training with her.
- The Courage of Honour Bright – Honor Bright falls foul of Aunt Betsy, a female Fagin. Aunt Betsy wants to turn Honor into a criminal, but Honor is determined to defend her honour to the last.
- The Despised Ones — Callie Conway is bullied at school because she is plain, awkward and has no friends. Her Aunt Susan is no help because she is not really interested in Callie. Then Callie meets a kindred spirit in Clop, a pony who is being bullied by the other ponies because he is plain and awkward too. Callie gets a job at the stables so she can get close to Clop, but most of the things she does go wrong – as usual.
- The Disappearing Girl — A girl volunteers for a conjuring act, which is visited by the ghost of the magician's deceased assistant.
- The Double Life of Delia — Heiress Delia Davenport is determined to help the poor people in Victorian London, but her guardians, Henry and Amelia, refuse to allow her money to spend on the poor. By behaving like a spoilt child, Delia is able to get money from them. Disguised as Lame Lottie, a crippled girl, Delia takes food and clothes to the needy living in the slums.
- The Double Life of Dolly Brown — In Victorian times, the Grimbys blackmail Dolly Brown into a fraudulent act in a travelling fair, where she has to pretend to be a life-size doll. When Dolly is not playing the doll, the Grimbys use her as a half-starved slave. The Grimbys keep Dolly enslaved with a story and poster (only partly intact) that she is wanted by the police. Dolly has lost her memory, so she has no idea what happened there.
- The Double Life of Julie-Ellen – Julie-Ellen Jones can't decide between two boys so she pretends to be twins to date them both. Chaos ensues as Julie-Ellen tries to keep up her double life.
- The Double Life of Ringo — Ringo the pup is leading a double life. He is caught between Sara Rochester, the girl who looks after him, and Tracey Morgan, who also needs him.
- The Double Life of Sad Sarah — Debbie Walters' father gets commissioned to draw a picture story, "Sad Sarah" – about a girl who patiently endures ill treatment from cruel relatives rather than worry her sick mother. Unknown to Mr. Walters, Sarah can come to life and is not as nice as her story counterpart, as she keeps making trouble for Debbie.
- The Farmer Wants a Wife — Ann and Helen Harrow feel their widower father needs a new wife to help look after the family and farm. So they set out to find a suitable woman, without telling him, but are not having much success.
- The Girl for Gareth – Michelle Taylor is trying to match her brother Gareth up with the perfect girl – but the perfect girl is proving elusive.
- The Girl in the Iron Collar — In the year 871, Rowena, a young Saxon girl, is sentenced to wear an iron collar and be banished from her village for (accidentally) betraying Edmund, the King of East Anglia, to the Vikings, who then killed him. Then she finds the triple-crowned cross of the Angles where King Edmund had hidden it. Without the cross, nobody can claim to be their king, and she helps Alfred of Wessex to take up his rightful role as King of the Saxons.
- The Girl They Love to Hate! — Trudy Maxwell has been a popular tennis player, but now she has adopted the persona "Terrible Trudy", the bad girl of tennis. She is trying to win as much money as possible to help her bankrupt father pay off his debts and thinks a bad girl reputation will attract more people to her matches and earn her more money. Her plan is working, but the price is loneliness and unpopularity.
- The Girl Who Can't Cry! — On the way to her new boarding school, Linda Laker sees a spaceship and overhears an invasion plan. The aliens place a girl, who is made to look and sound human, in the school. The alien has one defect — it cannot cry. So Linda sets out to find the imposter by making anyone she suspects cry.
- The Girl Who Hated Horses! — Why does Tracey Perls have a problem with horses?
- The Girl with Flaxen Hair — According to an old family curse, flaxen-haired Rosemary Polworth is not to see the second full moon after her thirteenth birthday. Rosemary does not believe it, but runs away rather than see her parents suffer on the night she is foretold to die. However, the parents send an agent out to find her, and he is not a pleasant type.
- The Girl With No Name — A nameless young girl on a remote island lives with a woman, Megan who has raised the girl to prove her theories that a human can be raised to reach their full potential and use all their brain's processing power. One day Megan is confronted by a Dr. Lee, which causes her to leave the island with the girl. They are separated in a storm and the girl is found by a fisherman. When she meets Doctor Lee again, she remembers that Megan had taken her from an orphanage, and decides to run off and find out who she could have been.
- The Girl with No Shadow — When Reyna Reynolds moves into the empty house next door to Jan Crawford, strange things start happening. The strangest of them all is that Reyna casts no shadow. Jan decides to pretend to be friends with Reyna in order to unravel her secret, although Reyna causes a lot of trouble for Jan.
- The Girls of 3C — flashbacks of school days at Millmead School Reunion.
- The Girls of Knock-Out Academy
- The Greys and the Greens — Lindy Grey is a great fan of a TV soap, "Life with the Greens", and copies the antics of the Green family on the soap. The problem is, things always go wrong for Lindy when she does so.
- The Guardian Tree – In Victorian times Rose Shaw must take care of her siblings after her parents die of influenza. The nasty workhouse beadle, Matthew Crowe, is eager to snap up the younger Shaws, but the family finds a new home in a cave under what they call "The Guardian Tree." Naturally, Crowe mustn't find out.
- The Hateful Heart of Cousin Carol — After Jane Croft's parents die, she is taken in by her Uncle and Aunt. But Jane's cousin Carol does not want to share her home with Jane, so she pretends to be friendly while playing tricks to get rid of her.
- The Healing Hands of Hanni — Hanni Todd, a gipsy orphan had a great gift for healing animals. The local animal doctor feared Hanni would take away all his customers, and had forced her to go into an orphanage where Hanni pined for her freedom. Mistress Crow, the matron of the orphanage, over-worked and under-fed the children, and used the orphanage funds for herself. One day Hanni was sent to treat a horse that belonged to Sir Oliver Christy, a man of great influence. She decided that if she could cure the horse, and earn Sir Oliver's gratitude, she would tell Sir Oliver what was going on at the orphanage.
- The Homecoming – Janey Wellson returns to her real family after learning she had been stolen from them as a baby. But the adopted son, Richard, resents her and is determined to cause trouble for Janey.
- The Jealousy of Jemma — Julie believes she is being terrorised by the spirit of her twin sister, Jemma.
- The Jinx — anything nasty written in a book called "the Jinx" comes true.
- The Lies of Lara — Lara Dennis and her mother move to a poorer part of town. Lara pretends to be from a wealthier area to impress her new, snobby classmates and gets caught in a tangle of lies.
- The Lonely Pony – Cath Watson is allowed to rent Camilla Baxter-Smythe's paddock for her horse Brantub because Camilla's horse Desert Sands is lonely and needs company. Cath does not get on so well with Camilla because she is a snob, but things begin to change as the girls train for show-jumping.
- The Long Sleep — In 1668 14-year-old Trudy Wain is taking a legal document to a lawyer in Chesterton. On the way she gets lost and comes across an empty cottage, where she pricks her finger on a spinning wheel and falls asleep for 300 years, waking up in 1968. She is taken in by the Carrs, and proves useful in identifying genuine 17th century artifacts for Mr Carr at auctions.
- The Lying Eyes of Linda Lee — Alison Payne and Linda Lee are being fostered on trial basis for adoption. Alison has looked after Linda ever since she was blinded in an accident. But Linda has secretly regained her sight and is keeping it that way until she gets rid of Alison, because she wants to be adopted alone. And Linda is going as far as animal cruelty in her tricks to get rid of Alison.
- The Lying Eyes of Linda — Linda Lyall is sent from a Children's Home to the wealthy Hampton family. By mistake they think she is blind and Linda is taking advantage to play on their sympathy.
- The Many Faces of Moppet – Janette Johnson rescues a doll, Moppet, from the river. But Janette does not realise that whatever facial expressions or poses Moppet is put into cause her to act in that exact manner, which gets her into trouble.
- The Many Faces of Morna — Under the stage name of Aurora Daye, Morna Reynolds enters the " Search for a Superstar" Contest—unknown to her nasty guardians, her Uncle Gerald and Aunt Sybil. Performing in disguise, Morna reaches the semi-finals, beating her unpleasant cousin, Pat, on the way. When Morna accidentally adds salt instead of sugar to the ingredients she packs for Pat's school cookery lesson, the spiteful Pat becomes determined to cause trouble for Morna in any way she can.
- The Mask — After Dorinda Lacey's parents die, she is taken in by her wealthy Aunt Clara. Aunt Clara tells Dorinda she is frightfully ugly. So Dorinda has to wear a mask at all times and every mirror in the house save the one in Aunt Clara's room is removed.
- The Millpark Mystery! — Three friends Ruth, Anne and Teri are starting a new school after their old school closes down. Their first day does not start out well, until they meet a nice teacher named Miss. Brown. But when they discover that no other students or teachers seem to like her, and see a different side to her, they decide they have to solve this mystery.
- The Mystery of Mavora — Shirley Duffield is on holiday at her grandfather's cottage beside the sea. She becomes fascinated by Mavora, a rock that looks like a mermaid combing her hair and beckoning. Legend has it that Mavora has lured many seamen to their deaths, and Shirley is now hearing strange voices that come from the direction of the rock. Then Shirley finds a comb that suggests that there may have been a real mermaid.
- The Outcasts of Underwood School — Twins Debbie and Carol Lowe sit a scholarship exam to Underwood Boarding School, and then wish they hadn't once they find out how snobby the Underwood girls are. However, they pass the scholarship exam and find themselves at Underwood as its first day pupils. But the snobby pupils do no make them welcome, and Virginia Fishenden is their worst enemy.
- The Pipes of Pam — Pam Piper is a pupil at Glofield Comprehensive. The school is guarded by three friendly witches who are upset that everyone seems to take life so seriously. So they give Pam some magic pipes. Whenever Pam plays them, amazing things happen.
- The Portrait of Pauline — Pauline Grey gets her portrait done by a street artist, she is told that it will show the true nature of the sitter. Pauline does not believe it, but changes her mind when the portrait begins to change for the worse. Realizing she must change her ways if the portrait is to improve, Pauline makes genuine efforts to do so, but things tend to go wrong and the portrait ends up looking bad again.
- The Posy Princess – Jill Bailey is treated like a servant by her relatives, but finds friends in Mrs Smith the Cook and Barbara the part-time chambermaid. Cook tells Jill about the Posy Princess competition, where contestants win posies at various tests, and the girl who wins the most posies wins. As this year's Posy Princess competition is the centenary one, there is a special prize of a month's holiday anywhere in the world. This prize would enable Jill to get to New Zealand and track down her kindly Aunt Kate. But her nasty cousin Marilyn is in the contest as well, and will do anything to make sure Jill doesn't win.
- The Quest of Anna Midnight — Anna Midnight, a talented artist, was left on the doorstep of a Children's Home as a baby. Her surname is Midnight because that was when she was found, but her true identity is a mystery. She goes in search of a travelling artist in Cornwall because she is convinced he is her father.
- The Quiet One — Danni is a vicious bully, but pretends to be nice and shy while bullying in secret.
- The Randell Road Girls — Soap like story set in Randell Road Comprehensive School, focusing on the lives of Alice, Bessie, Muriel and Diane.
- The Reluctant Witch — Wanda King is the last in a long line of witches — but only gains the power on the death of her mother.
- The Rescuer (1995) — Complete story about Debbie Smith and her new dog, Dash.
- The Rescuer — Vikki Brantwood is trying to make amends for neglecting her pony by rescuing others.
- The Riddle of the Lost Heiress — Joe and Bertha Castin, caretakers of Kenwood Hall, take Evvy Collins from a fairground and start training her up to impersonate Lady Evelyn, who mysteriously disappeared seven years ago at the age of five, so they can claim the Kenwood fortune. But the deception is not going well, and things get even more tangled when Evvy begins to find clues as to her real identity.
- The Ring of the Red Witch — Cara Kemp is staying at her aunt and uncle's while her parents are abroad. She finds a mysterious ring in the garden and when she tries it on she is unable to get it off again. Then Cara begins to have strange bouts of moodiness and bad temper.
- The Sad Spells of Fay Martin — On her twelfth birthday Fay Martin is told by Aggie, an old witch, that Fay is a changeling brought up to as a mortal. Fay can cast spells – but each one she uses means she is a day closer to be taken back to the Underworld.
- The Sad Star — Annabel Richards has lived with her cruel Aunt Flo and Uncle Fred Barlow since she was two and is forced to drudge for them and her cousins Celia and Shannon. When Annabel gets discovered by a modelling agency and is on the rise to television stardom, this leads to even more cruelty as her guardians set out to profit from her new job.
- The Secret Life of Dana — Dana Fenton is maid at the Arden Ballet School. Madame Rochelle, the principal, works her hard, but Dana wants to learn more about ballet. Under the name of Ann Smith, and disguised in a wig, she is secretly taking auditions for a scholarship with the Belmont Ballet Company.
- The Secret Life of Sally Shaw — Sally Shaw secretly becomes friendly with John, the crippled son of Colonel Blakely. The Colonel has kept John in a secret room at Redhill Manor, and few people know of his existence. Sally is a keen skater and is delighted when she finds a cleaning job at the ice-rink, as she can skate between chores. An instructor spots Sally and arranges for a boy called Drew to come and skate her. Drew is not happy with the idea, but then John begins to regain the use of his legs and take up secret skating with Sally.
- The Secret Nurse — Mary Miller wants to be a nurse, but lack of proper education is a barrier. So Mary takes a waitressing job in the hospital cafe so she can learn about nursing secretly.
- The Secret of Marion's Music Box — Marion Taylor is being looked after by her Aunt Madge and Uncle Wilf, who are cruel to her. She takes solace in her music box, which is magical. As Marion is the thirteenth girl to own it, she can travel back in time to meet the previous owners of the box.
- The Secret Scholar — In Victorian times, Lucy Seaton takes a skivvy's job at Marlowe Seminary for Young Ladies to secretly glean as much education as she can in order to sit a scholarship that she promised her dying parents she would do her best to win. But she has to contend with the tough skivvy life, spiteful snobby schoolgirls and hard senior staff.
- The Secret Skater of St. Kit's — Promising skater Kerry Richards is advised to enter the skating contest at the Winter Garden in town, but the headmistress puts the town out of bounds to all junior school. Kerry's friend Maureen Tait comes up with the idea of Kerry donning a disguise in order to enter the contest in secret. Under the guise of Sonia Dalton, Kerry is soon soaring high in the contest heats. But if she is discovered she will be expelled for breaking bounds.
- The Secret Song of Kate Darby – Kate Darby is searching for her long-lost brother, Ted, and earns her living by playing the accordion while she searches.
- The Simpsons in the Sky — Tina Simpsons' life changes when her father walks out on the family, then their mother loses her job and abandons them. Tina and her siblings move to a shelter on the roof top of their tower-block, where they can hopefully stay together until they get their mother back. Tina manages to get some part-time jobs, but for different reasons she ends up losing them. She also believes she sees her mother at times, but she never manages to catch up to her.
- The Singer from the Hills — Anna Meredith is a talented singer from a hill farm in Wales. She is under contract to Sam Harding and his wife Moira, who are greedy, dishonest and out to exploit Anna's talent for maximum profit. As a result, Anna is overworked but is having trouble finding the courage to stand up to them or put plans to get out of her contract into operation.
- The Singing Hinneys — The 4 Hinney siblings — Helen, Ben, Sandy and Susie — make a living by travelling around the country in Bessie, their minivan, and performing as a pop group. Helen, Ben and Sandy do the singing, while Susie handles the finances (whenever they get any money) and acts as band manager.
- The Slave Girls — In order to earn extra money, Suzanne and Sandy Miller advertise themselves as slave girls (complete with Roman costume) who work for a small payment. Each job always seems to give the girls some additional problem to solve.
- The Songs Of Melody Jones — Melody Jones is a talented singer, dancer and ventriloquist. When her grandfather goes to hospital, Melody reluctantly joins with the Clarkson family group. The Clarksons only want to use Melody to make money, so Melody is left with only one "friend" – Danny her dummy.
- The Sorrows of Laughing Anne — When Anne Foster unknowingly laughs at a witch, the witch retaliates with a spell that gives Anne a loud, hideous, uncontrollable witch's cackle that gets her into increasing trouble. When it reaches the point where Anne's father decides to send her away, Anne must do something fast to get the spell lifted.
- The Sorrows of Sarah — In the early 20th century, Sarah Smith is a music-hall conjurer and juggler. She had been looked after by Maggie Miller, but now Maggie is crippled and unable to speak after a stroke. Welfare authorities of the period force them to run away together, but music-hall work is hard to find. This forces Sarah to resort to third-rate halls, which are proving undesirable.
- The Sorrows of Smiley — Kathy Kay plays Smiley on a TV series "Northsiders". When her parents die in a flood, Kathy and her younger brother Tim were taken in by her Aunt Vera and Uncle Reg, whose only concern was the money Kathy earned.
- The Tammy Trilogy — A trilogy of serials starring Tammy Thumbe. Her next door neighbour Bobby Brown is into chemistry, but Bobby's formulas have strange effects on Tammy. In her first story, Tiny Tammy, Tammy shrinks whenever she gets wet. In her second story, Where's Tammy?, Tammy becomes invisible. In her third story, Be Your Age, Tammy!, Tammy behaves either too young or too old for her age.
- The Tennis Chimp — Cherry Marsden and her father move to a new town and Cherry joins a tennis club. But she doesn't have a partner for the doubles tournament. So she partners with Julie, an intelligent chimp who has been brought up as a human being. But some club members dislike the idea of a chimp entering the championship, and Mrs Hawkins in particular is out to stop them.
- The Tests of Sandra Supercook — Sandra Cook loves cooking and enters the "Queen of the Cooks" contest. She is winning heats, but has a big problem in that her cookery teacher, Miss Barker, hates her.
- The Third Wish — While on a pony trekking holiday, Becky accidentally stumbles across a pool and makes three wishes, one of which is that annoying know-it-all Nella gets what she deserves. After her first two wishes come true Becky starts to worry about her third wish so she begins looking out for Nella as it seems disaster could fall on her at any point.
- The Tribe at Number Ten – Carol Rogers’ mother looked after the invalid Mr Rogers and Gran for many years until they passed over. Now Carol is encouraging her mother to build a social life. But then widower Mr Thomson and his five children move into the street. Carol is worried at the way Mum is getting involved in looking after them when she is just building her social life and does not want her mother to get ideas about marrying Mr Thomson.
- The Trouble with Emmeline — Nicky Jones is delighted to receive a Victorian doll named Emmeline for her 13th birthday. Then Nicky realises Emmeline is evil and causing accidents around the place, but cannot convince her parents.
- The Trouble with Mum — Morna Cranston is delighted with her new stepmother. But events keep conspiring to give her parents the opposite impression.
- The Troubles of Tessa — Tessa Blake's brother John is crippled in a mine accident that also kills their father, and life gets tough for the Blakes. Tessa makes friends with Ruth Grayson, a rich crippled girl who wants to buy John's paintings. Tessa discovers Ruth's grandfather, Mr Grayson, owns the mine and also the woollen mill where she makes a hard living. Then Tessa and Mr Grayson discover that crooked managers have been stealing the money that Mr Grayson invested into both businesses for safe working conditions and proper machine maintenance.
- The Truth About Mum – When Mrs Morris returns home after an accident, she starts telling tall tales, then losing the memory of them. Her daughter Lucy covers up for her because she does not want to be separated from her mother again – but this causes problems for Lucy.
- The Truth About Sandy Starr – Stand-in Sandy Starr arranges the accident of the leading actress in a new film, and takes her place. But now Sandy's accomplice is blackmailing her, and added to that, she is being harassed by anonymous letters.
- The Truth About Wendy — Wendy Ware is to all appearances a sweet-natured, popular girl. However, there is always someone in the background who knows differently. In flashback, the person of the week recounts how they have fallen foul of this sneaky schemer. Wendy has hurt them, used them, blackened their names, in order to get her own way "but who will believe me? Only I know the truth about Wendy" they always conclude bitterly.
- The Two Faces of Toni — Toni Barton and Pauline Rogers are orphans who have been adopted by the Fletchers – a wealthy business couple. They are taken in by Toni's charm and prettiness, but Pauline knows Toni's charm is false.
- The Two Faces Of Trouble — Vicki Renton buys an old Gemini pendant which has the faces of two smiling girls. But in some mysterious way, their expressions could change and when this happened, Vicki's behaviour changes too.
- The Two-In-One Taylors — Identical twins Jill and Janet Taylor are spending their holidays with their grandparents. When Janet goes to join the local leisure center she finds there is only one place left. She joins up under the name Jay Taylor so her and Jill can both share the facilities. This causes some complications, especially when two boys Cyril and Terry take a fancy to each girl who they think is one person.
- The Ugly Duckling — A car accident kills Jane Carlton's father and leaves her with a scarred face that she is very sensitive about, and she has a long wait for the plastic surgery to fix the problem. Jane's sensitivity about her face is causing problems at her new locality and school. More problems arise when Mum falls for Roger Kemp and Jane realises he is dodgy.
- The Whispering Shell — Dawn Fenton finds a mysterious sea shell that whispers messages in rhyme to her.
- The Willing Hands of Meg Smith — In Victorian times, Meg Smith turns her hand to any job available to make ends meet for her younger siblings.
- There was a Young Girl Who Lived in a Shoe... — Bessie, maid to Mr Owens, had promised before he died that she would take care of the five children he had adopted. Mr Owens leaves them a strange-looking house that is shaped like a shoe! Mr Owens had been over-generous in his lifetime, so there is no money left to support the children. But Bessie is determined to keep the family together and make their own living.
- There's No Place Like Home — Hope Watson has a talent for singing, but her ambitions are not for fame.
- They Call it Aggro-batics! — The Cluffs and the Martins are feuding families. The daughters from each family are compelled to work with each other at their acrobatics class — then find they work well together. But can they work equally well to end the family feud?
- They Must Stay Together — When her friend's parents split, Debbie fears the same may happen to her parents so she tries to find them more interests to share. But the task of finding a common interest is leading into scrapes.
- Time Slip – During half-term break, Trudi Clark accompanies her father on an archaeological excavation at a site where a medieval village is said to be. The dig yields an old box that looks at least three hundred years old and Dad asks Trudi to hold it. But when she does, the whole environment changes to a medieval appearance, with no sign of her family...
- Timid Tina - Tina Hamilton is a shy girl. When her father remarries, Tina feels inferior to her new stepsisters, Sandy and Louise, and younger brother Craig, because they are all lively and talented.
- Toni's Troubles – Mum suddenly returns after walking out years before. However her daughter Toni, who has been raising the family since Mum's departure, is secretly trying to get rid of Mum because she is convinced that Mum is up to something.
- Toni's Two Dads – Toni Glover has always wanted a dad, so she is thrilled to suddenly find herself with TWO, when her mother remarries and her real father returns from abroad to live nearby. However, the new situation causes a few problems.
- Toni's Two Mums — Toni Dixon's parents are divorced. She lives with her mother during the week and her father, stepmother Diane and baby William at weekends. This is causing problems, even at Christmas.
- Too Many Mums! — Julia Casson's divorced parents return from overseas, having remarried. This leaves Julia with three "mums" – her mother, new stepmother and Auntie Joyce. Each mum has different ideas on what is best for Julie, such as which school she is to attend. This causes a lot quarrelling, and Julia is caught in the middle.
- Too Much Mum — Kate Croft's mum has worked hard since Kate's dad died. Now she has inherited some money and given up work to spend more time with Kate. But Kate is becoming more and more irritated with her mum, who is taking over every part of her life.
- Topsy Turvey – Topsy Turvey is sent an aborigine witch doctor's pendant, and finds that the pendant can turn upside-down the personality of anyone else who looked at it e.g. make a lying cheat tell the truth.
- Toys! — Jan buys some material to make stuffed toys, only for the toys to mysteriously come to life.
- Tuesday's Child — When Tuesday Wood's mother dies of illness and her father is imprisoned for debt, Tuesday is sent to live with her aunt and street musician uncle.
- Twin Trouble — Rona and Lynn Jefferson were twins—but they were oh so different.
- Two Of A Kind — Carrie and Val Grantley live on their parents farm and both love ponies. Carrie is a less confident rider than her younger sister. She takes on a nervy pony named Patchwork, that nobody else wanted. Together they help build up each other's confidence.
- Two Plus One — Katy is Dave's girlfriend, but then she meets Tony.
- Us — Plus Boys! — Best friends are drifting apart.
- Valda — Valda is a mystery super-girl who inherits mysterious powers after bathing in a mysterious pool of light; a mythic pendant she wears, known as the Crystal of Life, also gives her eternal life and athletic skills. Valda uses her powers to come to the aid of others.
- Very Important Person! – Jill Jordan takes second place to her sister Mandy. Then a great aunt dies, and leaves a fortune – but with the stipulation that any expenditure be approved by Jill. Now the family treats Jill like a VIP — but there is scheming afoot.
- Very Important Pupil — Lynne Williams had been the most insignificant pupil at Cramley House Boarding School, until she was caught in the rays of an exploding meteorite!
- Wanda's Weather Stone — When Wanda Williams captures a small cloud, a shadow speaks to her from the mist, asking her to release his little one. As a reward Wanda is given a special pendant with the promise "Hold the stone within your hand, and find the climes at your command". But the weather stone doesn't bring her much luck.
- Wanted – A Home! — Orphaned twins Gary and Lester Stark are trying to find a foster home, but none of them are working out.
- Warrior Must Win! — Golden Warrior is a stallion who belongs to Brian Edwards, a famous three day event rider. When Brian is paralysed in an accident, his twin daughters Sally and Sarah take over Warrior's training. Sarah is supposed to be the better rider but loses interest, so Sally takes her place and begins to hope she will win the championship.
- We Matter Too — Chris Reid's little brother, Paul has died of a rare disease. The whole family is devastated— especially Mum, who isn't coping well at all.
- We’ll be a Happy Family — The parents of Heather and Carly Clayton have been missing for a year after a jungle air crash but have now returned. Heather is overjoyed but Carly starts causing trouble. She had enjoyed a luxurious life with the Warringtons, the foster-family the girls stayed with, but it made her spoiled and snobby, and she wants to keep in touch with them. The parents resent this and this leads to arguments. But when Heather tries to tell the Warringtons about Carly's conduct they refuse to listen.
- Weather-Girl Willa — Willa Martin acquires a barometer at a jumble sale. She does not realise it has the power to affect her moods with whatever weather forecast it is showing.
- Wedding of the Week – Kay Harper runs a feature, "Wedding of the Week" for the local newspaper.
- Wee Slavey – In Victorian times, Nellie Perks works as a maid servant for the Shelby Smythes.
- We’ll be a Happy Family - The parents of Heather and Carly Clayton have been missing for a year after a jungle air crash but have now returned. Heather is overjoyed but Carly starts causing trouble. She had enjoyed a luxurious life with the Warringtons, the foster-family the girls stayed with, but it made her spoiled and snobby, and she wants to keep in touch with them.
- Wendy Out West — Ranch life in America.
- Wendy will be Married! — Pam Johnson is trying to get her sister Wendy married so they can escape their miserable existence with their unpleasant relatives. But the relatives are aware of this and are trying to stop Wendy marrying and leaving them.
- Wendy Won't Win! — Wendy Moore is a professional tennis player but is cursed by a gypsy woman Zara to never win another match. Although she doubts the truth of the curse a string of defeats increases her nerves.
- Wendy's Web — Carol is determined to help her friends, who are being blackmailed (with false information) by Wendy Allen.
- What Lila Wants... — Sarah Paterson has been living with her aunt and uncle since her parents' deaths. But Sarah's spoiled cousin Lila resents her and is trying to get rid of her while pretending to be friendly.
- When Susie Sneezes — A weird old lady passes on a strange power to Susie Green. When Susie sneezes, whatever wish she makes at the time comes true. But this causes problems because Susie sneezes a great deal as she has so many allergies, and the heat of the moment has her wishing things she doesn't mean.
- Where are the Children? — In Victorian times, Flossie Ford is a poor slum girl that has made good and now runs her own florist shop in Cheapwell. Street children start disappearing from Cheapwell. Homeless, uncared-for waifs are the targets, but one exception is Flossie's cousin Frankie Ludd, so it is personal for her and her Aunt Ada.
- Who Hates Steve? — Nicola is investigating who is playing tricks on her boyfriend, Steve.
- Who is ‘J’? — Vicky Brown's sister Mary is emotionally upset by someone with the initial ‘J’, and then has a road accident that leaves her comatose. Vicky turns detective to track down ‘J’, believing ‘J’ to be responsible for Mary's accident. But this has her hurting a lot of innocent people whose names begin with J because she has wrongly assumed they are ‘J’.
- Who is Judy Parker? — Judy Parker senses that the cruel matron of "the Towers" orphanage, Miss Kent, knows something about her mysterious past. It soon becomes apparent that Judy is facing some kind of danger as well.
- Who is Sad Sally? — In Victorian times, Sally is an orphan with no memory of her past and unable to speak. She is taken in by Mrs Crabstick, a beggar woman. But Mrs Crabstick runs a den of thieves and exploits Sally's inability to speak for begging purposes.
- Whodunnit? — Actors in a detective theatrical drama become real detectives after someone wrecks the props.
- With Love from Lindy — Lindy Hughes lives with her widowed mother and 4 younger siblings. Money is often tight, so Lindy does a paper route to help out.
- Wonder Girl! — Miss Harriet Dene, a renowned woman scientist, has brought up a girl known only as J. Smith on a remote island in the Hebrides in an experiment to make her a perfect specimen, both physically and mentally. Deciding "Jay" is ready, Miss Dene takes her to the mainland to put her to the test with a barrage of practical tests.
- You Can Do Better — Helen Wood wants to be a top figure skater. The mysterious Madame Swenson offers to coach her in return for total dedication. And she means TOTAL – Madame Swenson is an extremely demanding coach.
- You Little Monkey! — Jenny's brother Rex turns into a monkey and she spends her time trying to hide this from her parents.

== Sources ==
- Mandy at the Grand Comics Database
- Mandy for Girls Annuals at the Grand Comics Database
- Mandy & Judy at the Grand Comics Database
