= It Happened in Canada =

- Author: Gordon Johnston
- Current status/schedule: defunct
- Launch date: 1967
- Genre(s): non-fiction, history

It Happened in Canada was a syndicated Canadian cartoon feature by Gordon Johnston that presented Canadian facts and achievements in a manner similar to Ripley's Believe It or Not!. As many as 65 newspapers in Canada carried the comic during its run from 1967 to the 1980s. Some episodes featured relatively obscure details about Prime Ministers such as R. B. Bennett and John Diefenbaker.

== Works ==
Several collections of the comic were published as books:

- Johnston, Gordon; Al Oliver (1967). It Happened in Canada. London, Ontario: Algor Features.
- Johnston, Gordon (1971). Johnston's It Happened in Canada Volume 2. Toronto Star Reader Service.
- Johnston, Gordon (c. 1976). More It Happened in Canada. Scholastic-TAB.
- Johnston, Gordon (c. 1976). Still More It Happened in Canada. Scholastic-TAB.
- Johnston, Gordon (1983). It Happened in Canada. Methuen.
- Johnston, Gordon (c. 1983). It Happened in Western Canada. Western Producer.
- Johnston, Gordon (1991). It Happened in Canada. Toronto: Scholastic Canada. ISBN 0590740695.
