= Renzo Calegari =

Italian comic artist

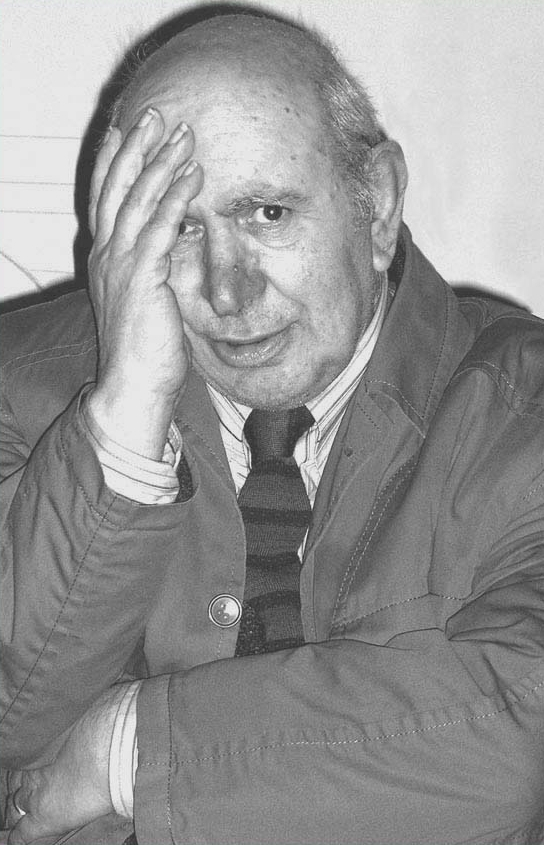
- Born: 5 September 1933; Genoa, Kingdom of Italy
- Died: 5 November 2017 (aged 84); Genoa, Italy
- Occupation: Cartoonist
- Years active: 1955–2017

Renzo Calegari (5 September 1933 – 5 November 2017) was an Italian comics artist.

== Life and career ==
Born in Genoa, Calegari left his studies in accountancy to enter the art studios of Roy d'Ami. He made his professional debut one year later, collaborating with Gian Luigi Bonelli in the series El Kid, I Tre Bill, and in 1955 Davy Crockett. In 1957 he began a fruitful collaboration with Fleetway Publications, in which he specialized in drawing war comics.

In 1967 he co-created with Gino D'Antonio his best known work, the long-lasting comic book series Storia del West, which ran until 1980, and for which he illustrated numerous stories. After several years of hiatus, he reprised his activities in the second half of the 1970s, collaborating with the magazines Skorpio, Il Giornalino, Orient Express and Zodiaco.
