= Advertising in comic books =

Comic book advertising

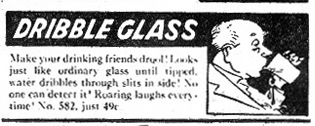
The dribble glass was a typical comic book advertisement

Comic book advertisements are a common feature in American comic books mainly from the 1940s onwards. As these advertisements were directed at young people, many made sensational claims, and sold the products for a few dollars or less, to be sent to a post office box. Products offered included novelty items, toys, and self-improvement courses such as drawing and body building.

== Companies ==
The Johnson Smith Company placed advertisements for gadgets and toys that appeared on the back cover of many historically significant comic books, including Action Comics #1 (June 1938) (the first appearance of the character Superman) and Detective Comics #27 (May 1939) (the first appearance of the character Batman).

== Notable products offered ==
- Charles Atlas illustrated bodybuilding book
- Disappearing ink
- Dribble glass
- Itching powder
- Joy buzzer
- Latex mask
- Potato gun
- Sea-Monkeys
- Sneezing powder
- Squirting flower
- Stink bomb
- Whoopee cushion
- X-ray specs

The ads also included recruitment of youngsters to act as salespeople for products such as greeting cards and the national newspaper Grit.

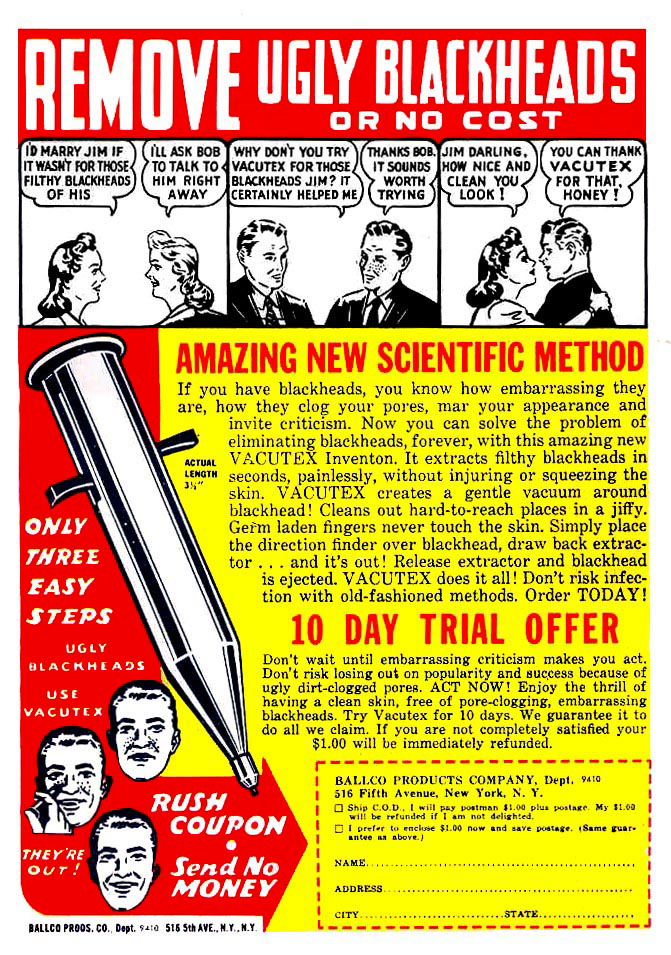

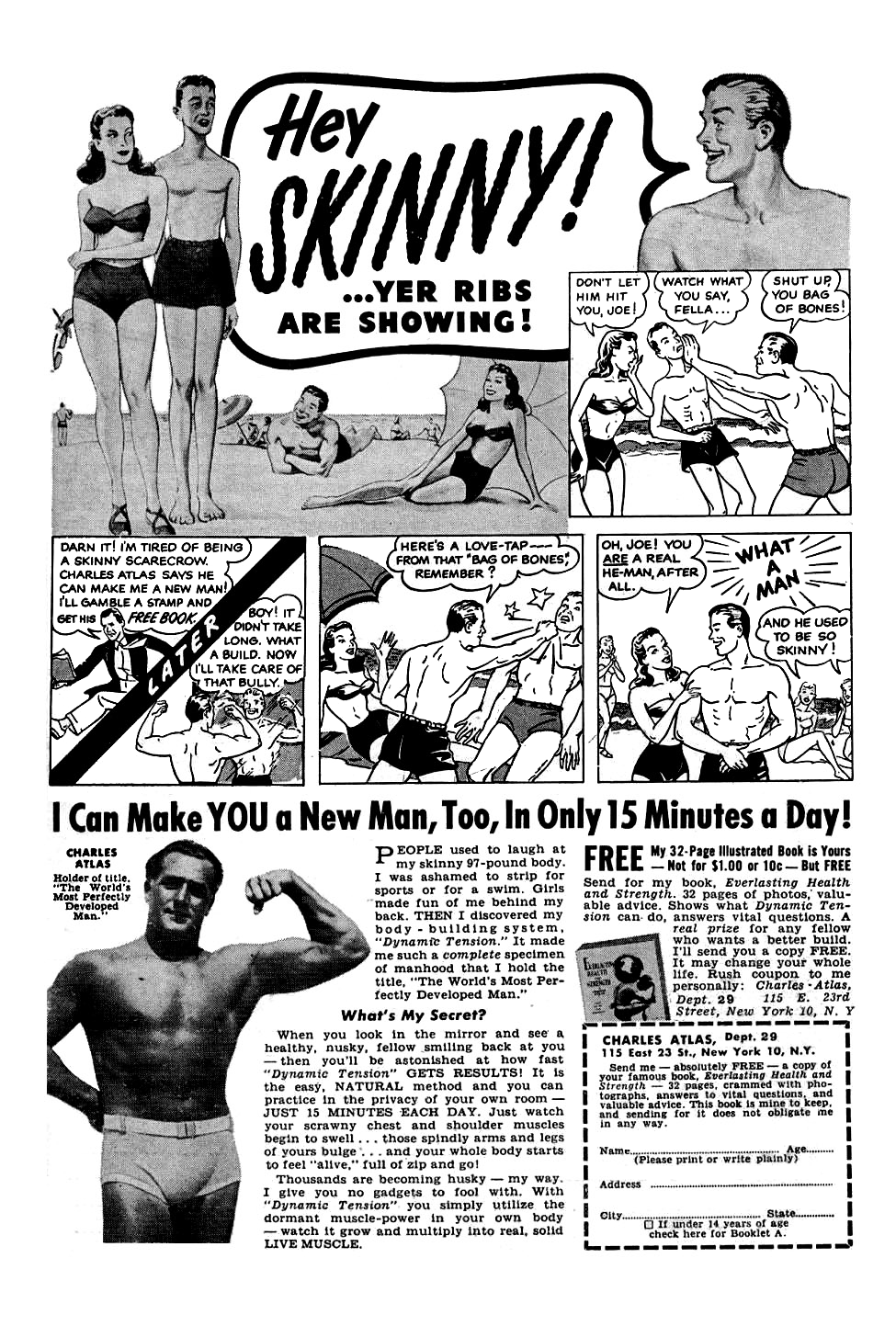

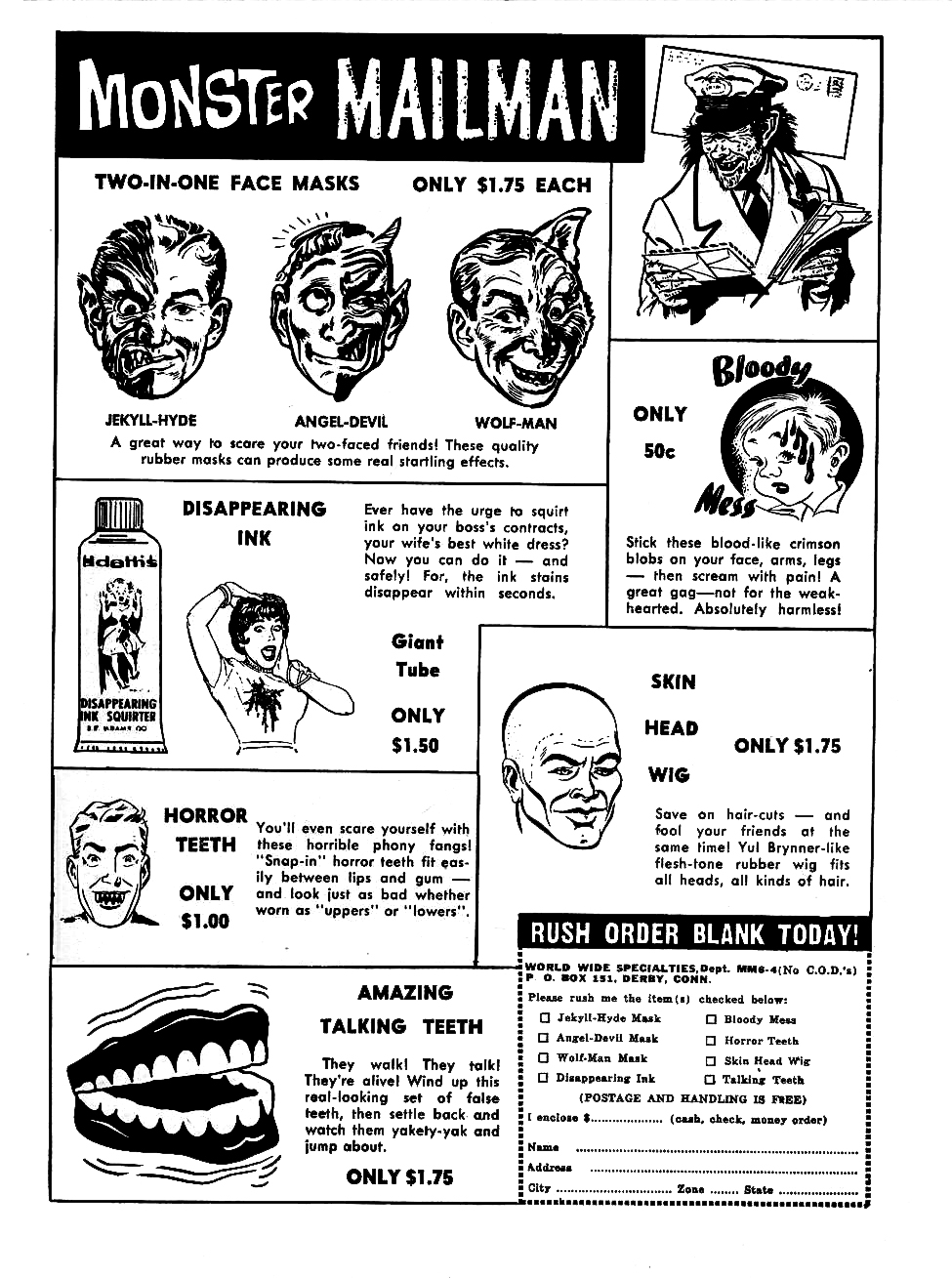

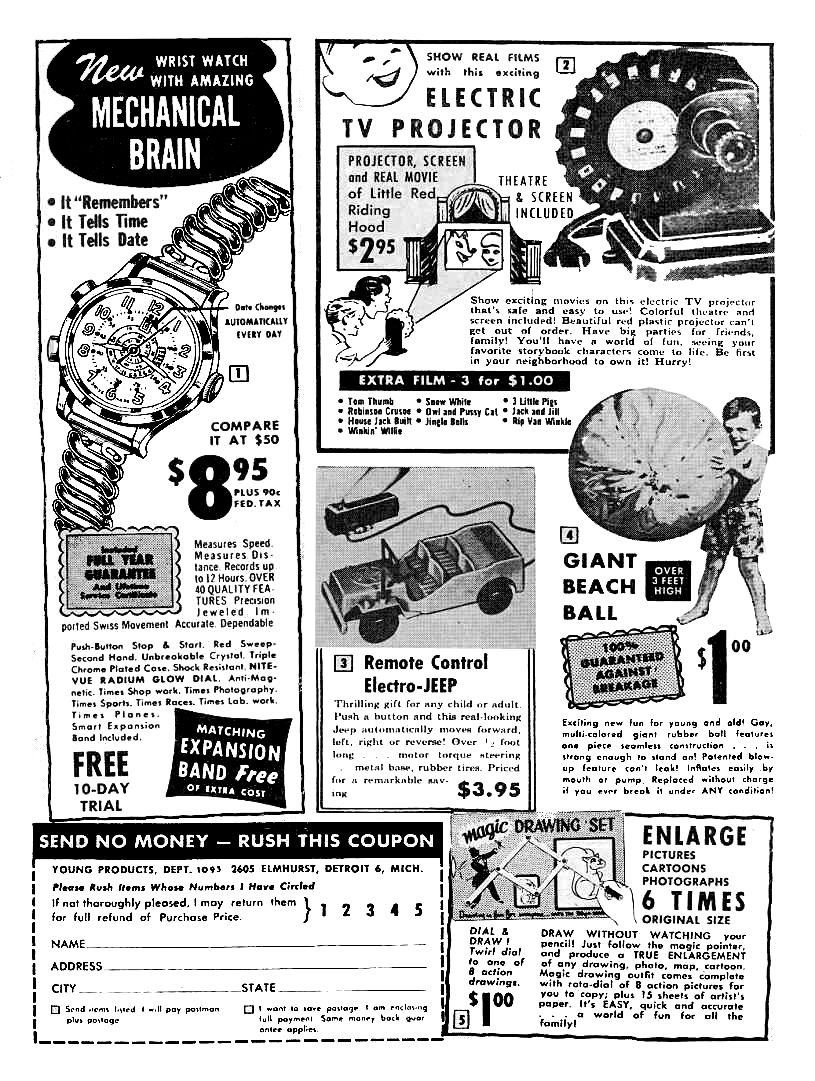

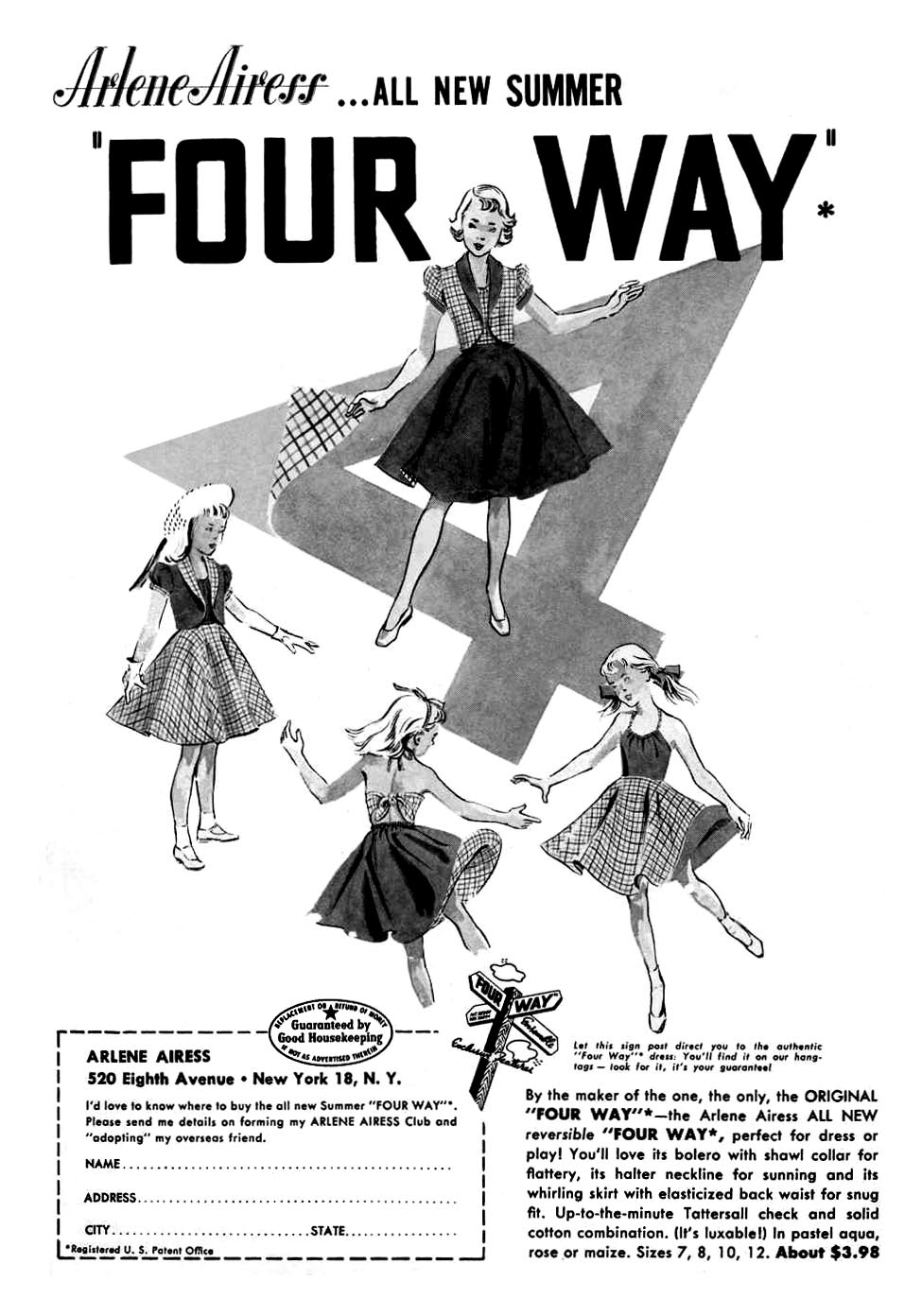

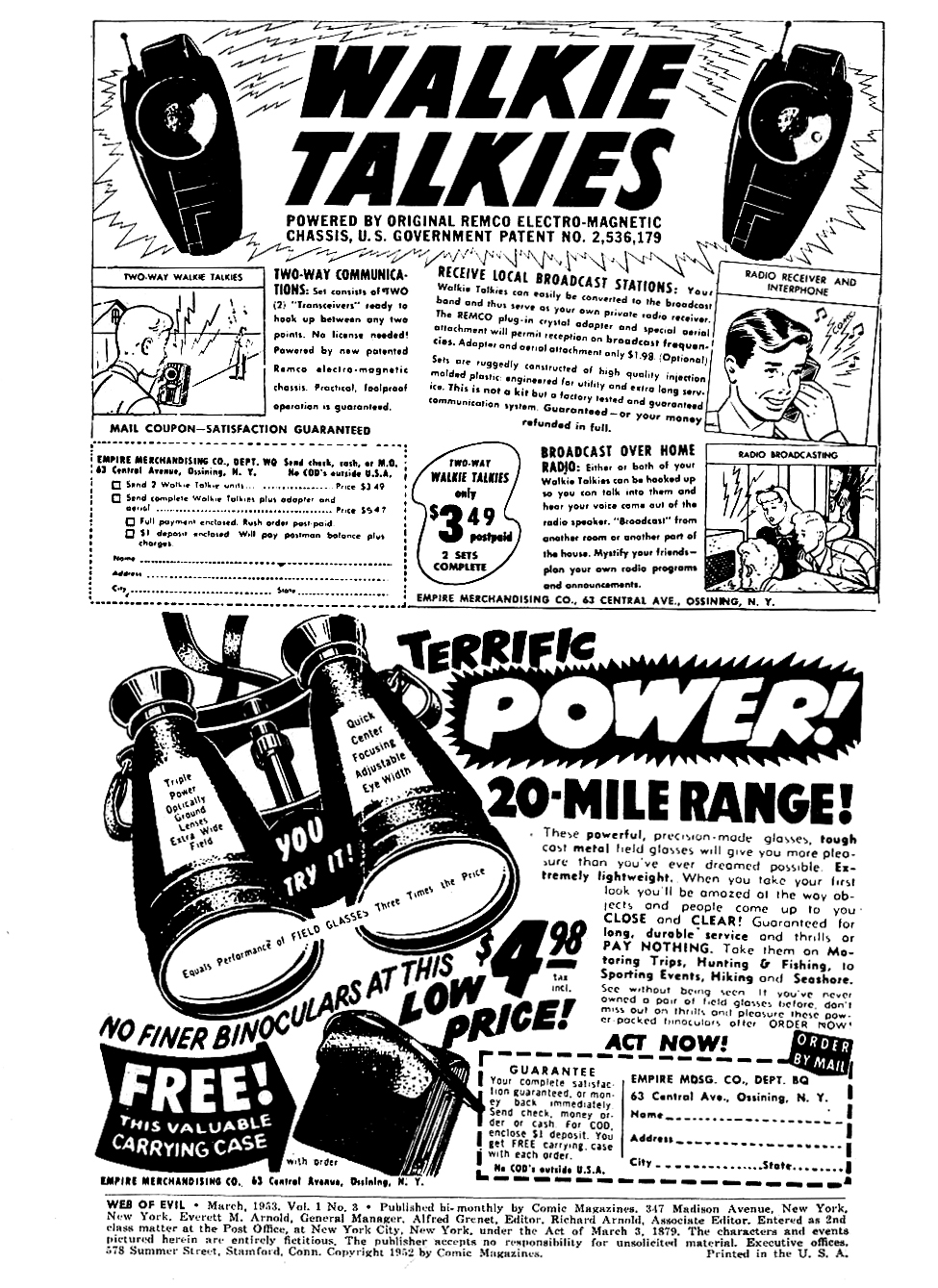

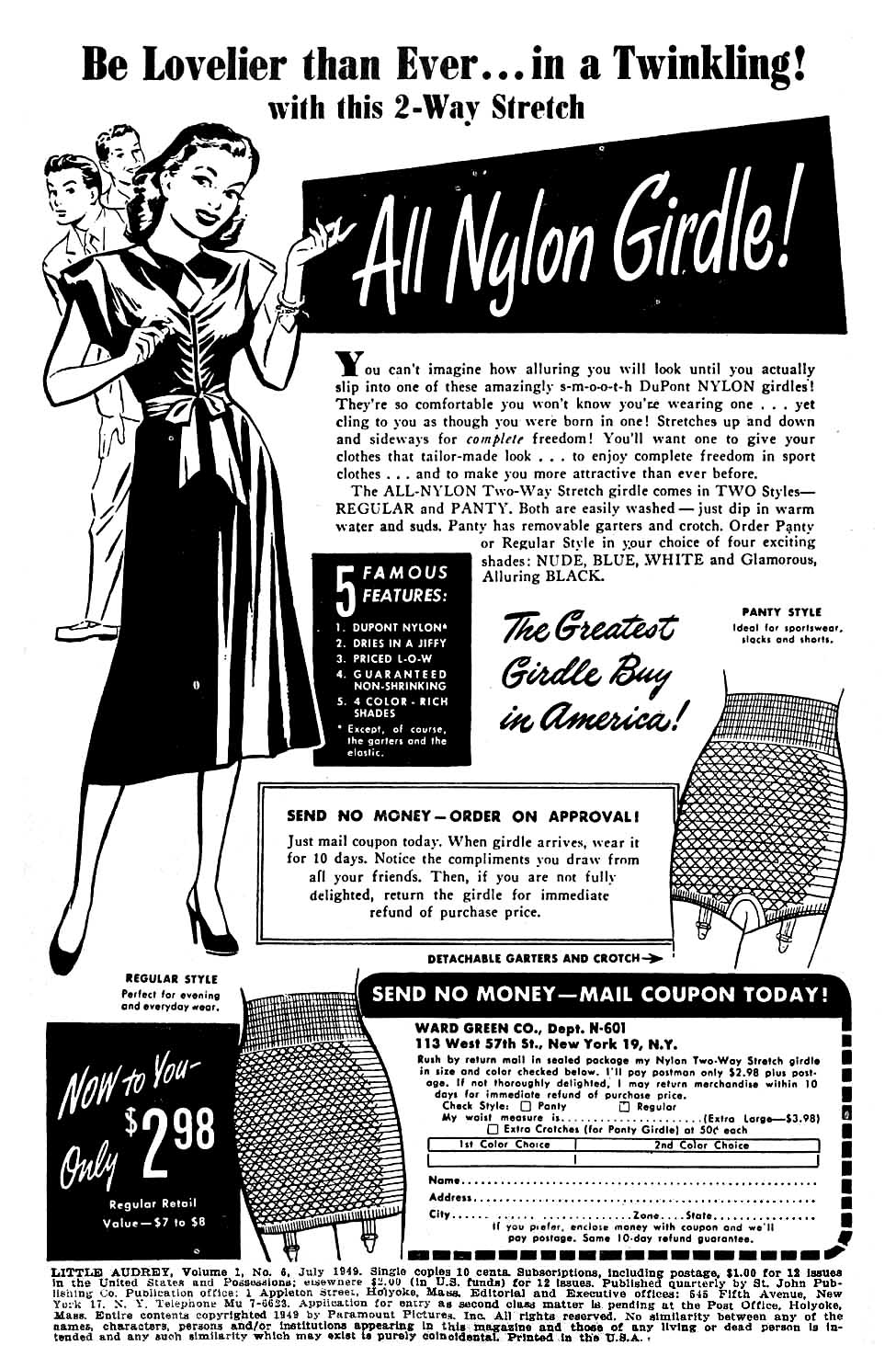

== See also ==
- Advertising to children
- Soren Sorensen Adams – a Danish-American inventor and manufacturer of novelty products, including the joy buzzer.
- Toy advertising
