= Squirting flower =

Squirting flower may refer to:

- A type of practical joke device
- Spathodea, a flower that squirts when squeezed
