= Louis Glackens =

American illustrator and cartoonist

Louis M. Glackens (1866–1933) was an American illustrator, animator, and cartoonist, commonly credited as L. M. Glackens. He was the brother of Ashcan School painter and illustrator William Glackens.

== Early life ==
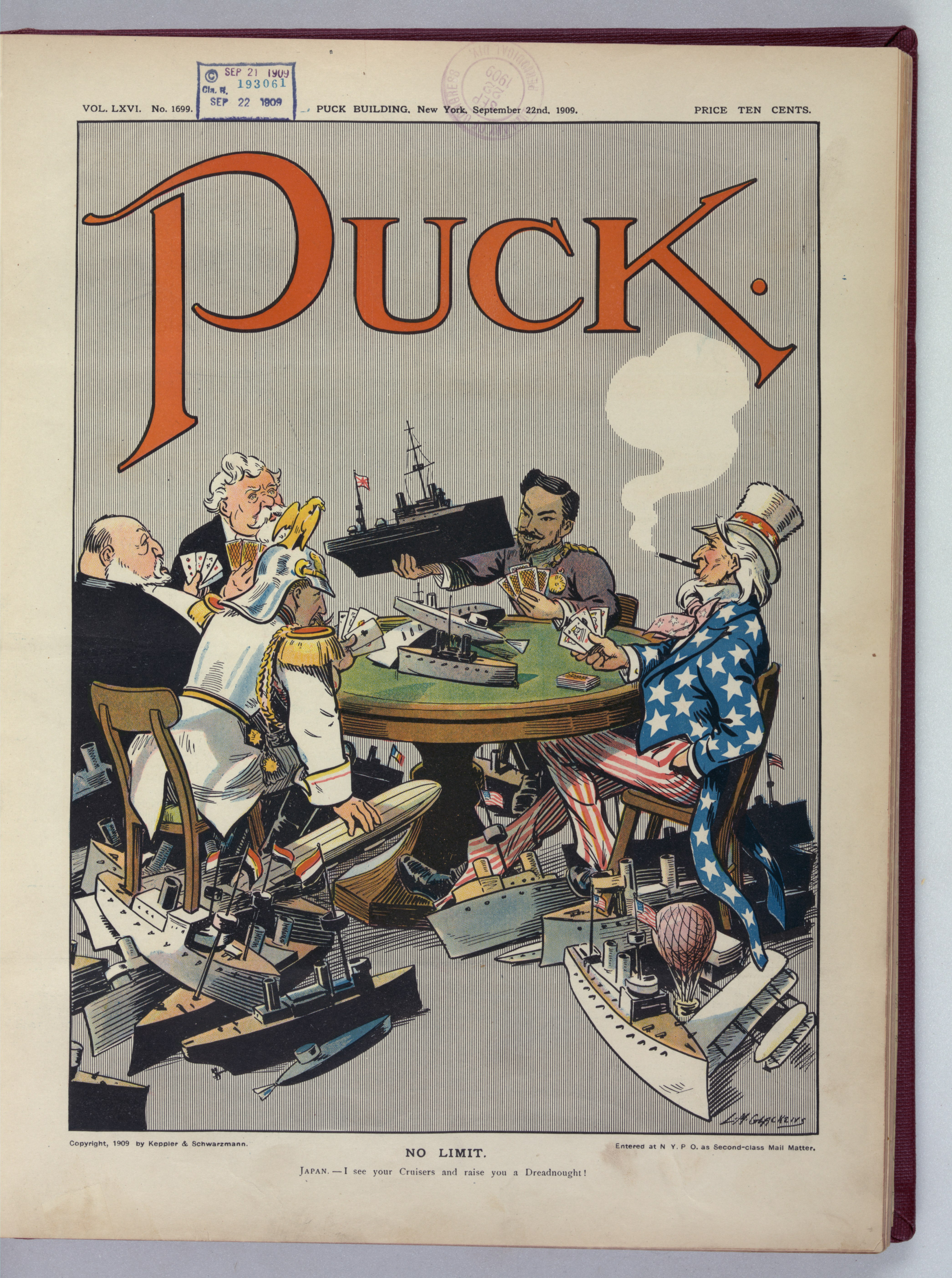
No limit, one of his covers for Puck.

Glackens was born in Philadelphia, Pennsylvania.

== Career ==
In the 1890s he began to work for Puck, a magazine known for its political and social satire, where his humorous depictions of different ethnic groups reflected the melting pot of New York City at that time. When Puck was sold in 1914, he began to work for Barré Studio and Bray Productions pioneering some early animation films.

Glackens also worked as a book illustrator, creating humorous illustrations for The Log of the Water Wagon and Monsieur and Madame. He was hired by Samuel Sorenson Adams to create advertisements for the Joy Buzzer and other classic novelty items.

== Filmography ==
- A Stone Age Adventure (1915)
- When Knights Were Bold (1915)
- Haddem Baad's Elopement
- Another Fallen Idol
- How Dizzy Joe Got to Heaven (1916)
- Stone Age Roost Robber (1916)
- What Next (1916)
- Greenland's Icy Mountains (1916)
- The Pen Is Mightier Than the Sword (1916)
- What Happened to Willie (1916)
- Independent Poland (1916)
- Jack the Giant Killer (1916)
- My, How Times Have Changed (1916)
- Me und Gott (1918)
- The First Flyer (1918)
- Von Loon's 25,000-Mile Gun (1918)
- Von Loon's Non-Capturable Aeroplane (1918)
- Private Bass His Pass (1919)
- The Biography of Madame Fashion (1919)
- Tying the Nuptial Knot (1919)
- Yes, Times Have Changed (1920)

== See also ==
- John Randolph Bray
- Bray Productions
