= Joy buzzer =

Practical joke device

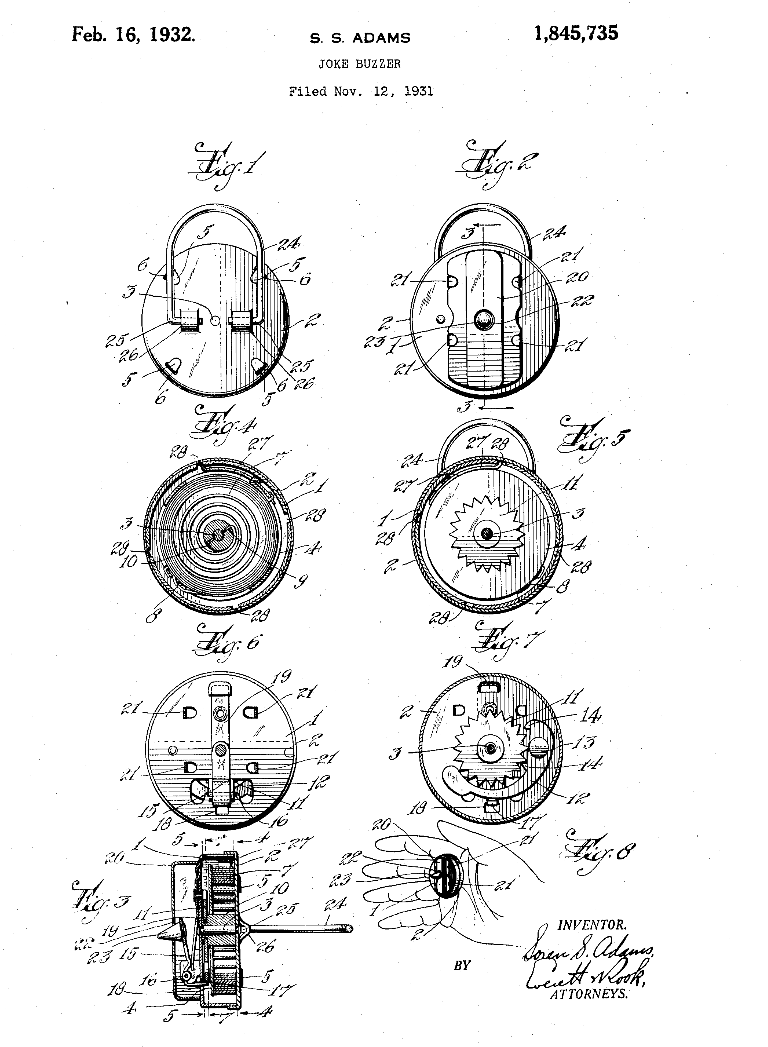
Patent drawing, from Soren Adams's 1932 US patent application.

A joy buzzer (also called a hand buzzer) is a practical joke device that consists of a coiled mainspring inside a disc worn in the palm of the hand. When the wearer shakes hands with another person, a button on the disc releases the spring, which rapidly unwinds creating a vibration that mimics an electric shock to the unsuspecting victim.

== History ==
The joy buzzer was invented in 1928 or 1931 by Soren Sorensen "Sam" Adams of the S.S. Adams Co. It was modeled after The Zapper, a product that was similar to the joy buzzer, but did not have a very effective buzz and contained a button with a blunt point that would hurt the recipient's hand.

Adams brought a large prototype of his newly designed buzzer to Dresden, Germany, where a machinist created the tools that would make the parts for a new palm-sized Joy Buzzer. In 1932, the item received U.S. patent 1,845,735 from the U.S. Patent Office. The instant success of the new item allowed Adams to move to a new building and increase the size of his company. Adams continued to send royalty payments to the tool and die maker until 1934 when the payments were returned.

In 1987, Sam Adamses' son, Joseph "Bud" Adams, redesigned the mechanism for greater durability and a louder buzz, marketing it as the Super Joy Buzzer.

== Electric shock ==
A common misconception, largely due to false advertising by the makers of the device, is that the joy buzzer delivers an electric shock, when in fact it only causes a vibration simulating a shock.

== Related device variations ==
Some device variations were later created to actually shock the person being pranked rather than simulate the shock with vibrations. These devices include the shocking pen, which generates a mild electric shock when a victim clicks the button on top, or shocking gum, which also delivers a mild electric shock when a victim touches or pulls upon what appears to be the last stick of gum from a box.

== See also ==
- Chinese finger trap
- Whoopee cushion
- Snake nut can
- Chewing gum bug
- Fake vomit
- List of practical joke topics
