= Whistle tip =

Vehicle exhaust pipe creating a whistling sound

Whistle tips, also referred to as whistler tips, or whistlers, are modified vehicle exhaust pipes that generate a whistling sound during the operation of a motor vehicle that can often be heard up to a mile away.

The whistle tip is a small metal plate with a central hole that is welded into the inner tip of the exhaust pipe. As exhaust gases are forced through the exhaust system under pressure, they pass through the hole and generate a whistling sound similar to a steam locomotive whistle. This fad began in Oakland; the origin of the technique reportedly began with A-1 Muffler, Brake, and Radiators. Removable whistle tips have long been used as practical joke devices prior to this fad.

== California ==
In 2002, San Leandro, California redrafted its noise ordinance to ban the devices. The Oakland Police Department began cracking down on them by interpreting state laws as including tinkering with mufflers. The Berkeley City Council supported a measure by Assemblywoman Wilma Chan (D-Alameda) introduced a bill into the California State Assembly in 2003 which would effectively ban whistle tips in California. The bill was passed 22–15 by the state senate and then signed into law by Governor Gray Davis, going into effect on January 1, 2004. While violators will be subject to fines of $250 and businesses that install them can be fined up to $1,000, surcharges and enforcement fees will bring it up to $850 and $3,400, respectively. The ban has been codified by California Department of Motor Vehicles listed as division 12, chapter 5, article 2, section 27150.3.

== Internet culture ==
Whistle tips were popularized by an Internet phenomenon; a KRON-TV interview in which an Oakland man nicknamed Bubb Rubb and his colleague Lil Sis defended and demonstrated the use of whistle tips went viral (specifically, when Rubb enthusiastically, but rather poorly, imitates the sound of the whistle) and was the subject of derivative works on websites such as YTMND.
