= Penny toy =

Inexpensive tin toys manufactured in Germany

Penny toys is a name used for inexpensive tin toys mostly manufactured in Germany between the 1880s and 1914 that were sold in the UK, Europe and America in the late 19th century and early 20th century.

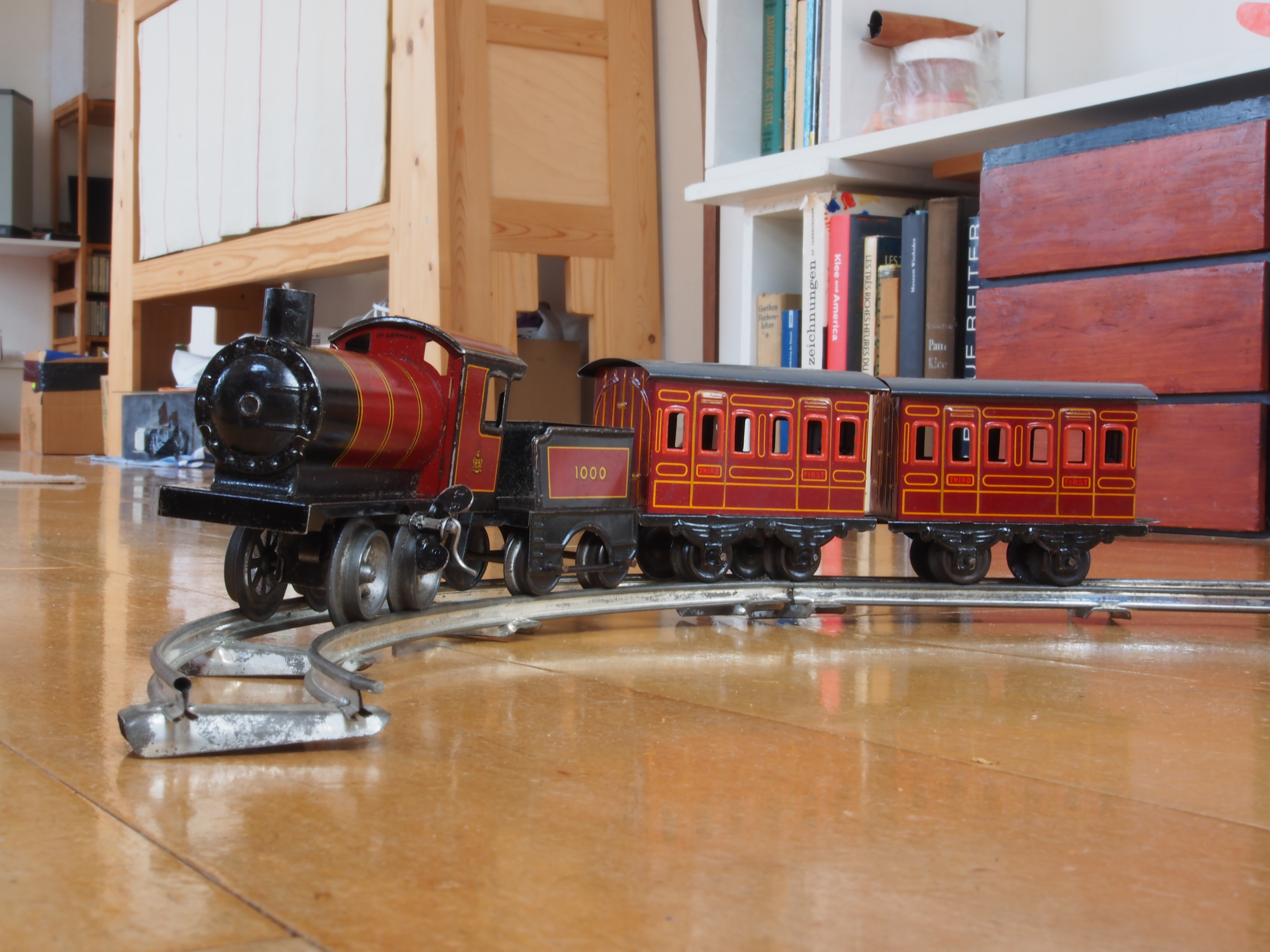
Tin clockwork toy train, German manufacture, c. 1900

== Description ==
Penny toys, also known as tin toys, were made of tin metal with painted surfaces that typically included excellent detail. Most penny toys were manufactured in Germany and were originally sold to wholesalers by the gross for 8 shillings allowing the seller, often street peddlers to sell them for a substantial profit. Typically the toys were miniatures, that is; under 10 cm and often included elements that facilitated movement, adding to their charm. In the United Kingdom, the toys were sold for one Penny, hence the popular name of penny toys.

The advent of penny toys broadened the market for children's toys, by making them accessible and affordable for working-class families. Although penny toys were manufactured into the first decades of the 20th century, the period 1885 -1914 is the peak period for their production. Today, penny toys are highly collectible. Publicly accessible examples can be found in museums in England, North America, Scandinavia and across Europe; including Birmingham Science Museum in England, Royal Ontario Museum in Canada, Plassenburg Zinnfiguren Museum in Germany and Museo des Soldados de Iberica in Valencia, Spain.

=== Types ===
Individual toys were manufactured for specific markets. Examples include; London omnibuses and ambulances destined for the British market; French postal delivery vans for Continental Europe and American locomotives intended for sale in America. Types of penny toys included toy dolls, whistles, trains, motorcars, public transport and emergency vehicles, trucks, soldiers, animals and even a small Bible.

== Manufacture ==
Offset color lithography enabled fine detail and color to be applied to sheets of tin plate quickly and economically. Shapes were machine-cut and stamped and then assembled by unskilled workers, sometimes in cottage industries. Many were manufactured by the Johann Philip Meier company of Nuremberg.

== Gallery ==
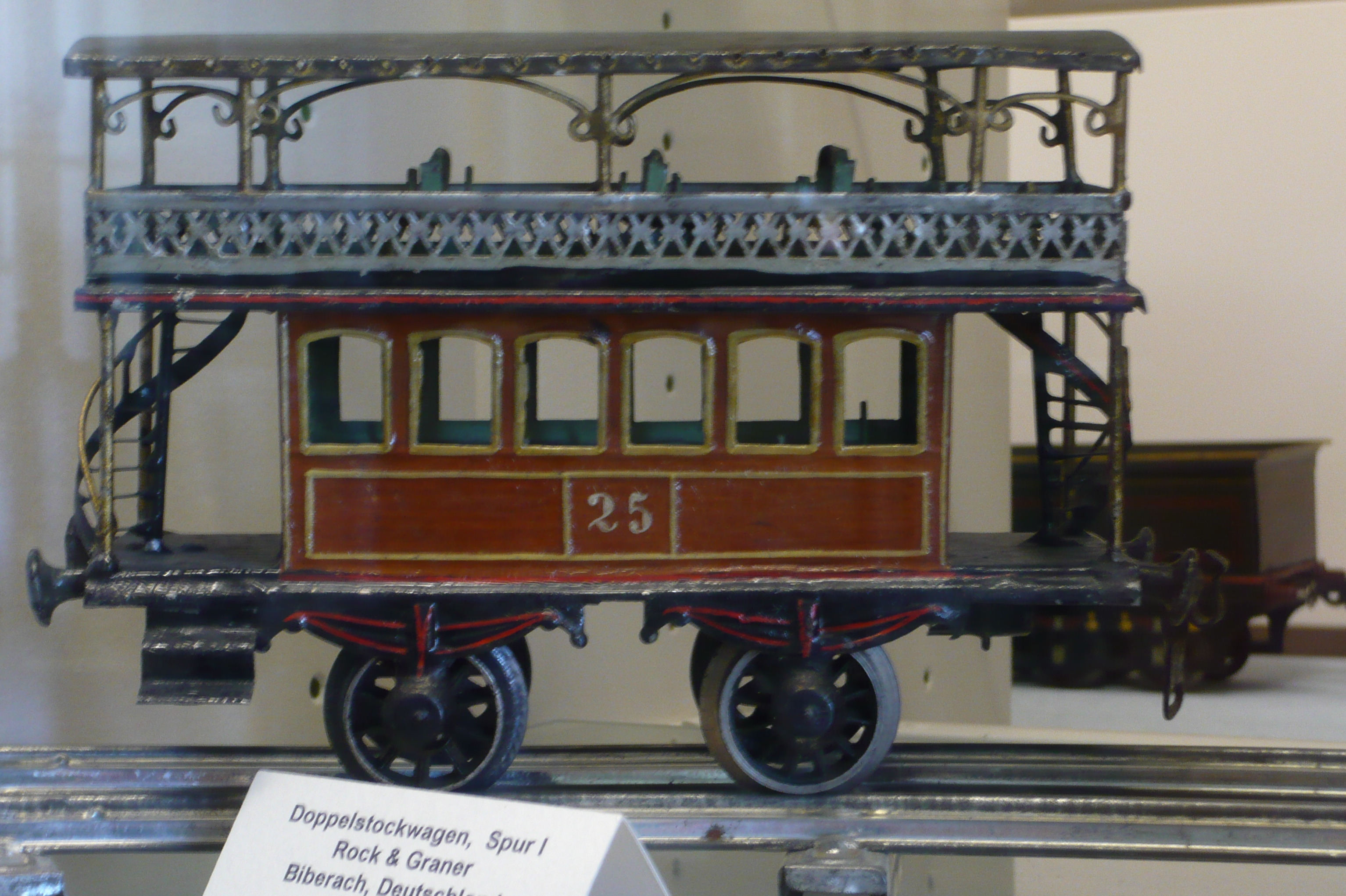
Train carriage, 1895, Züricher Spielzeugmuseum 1000742

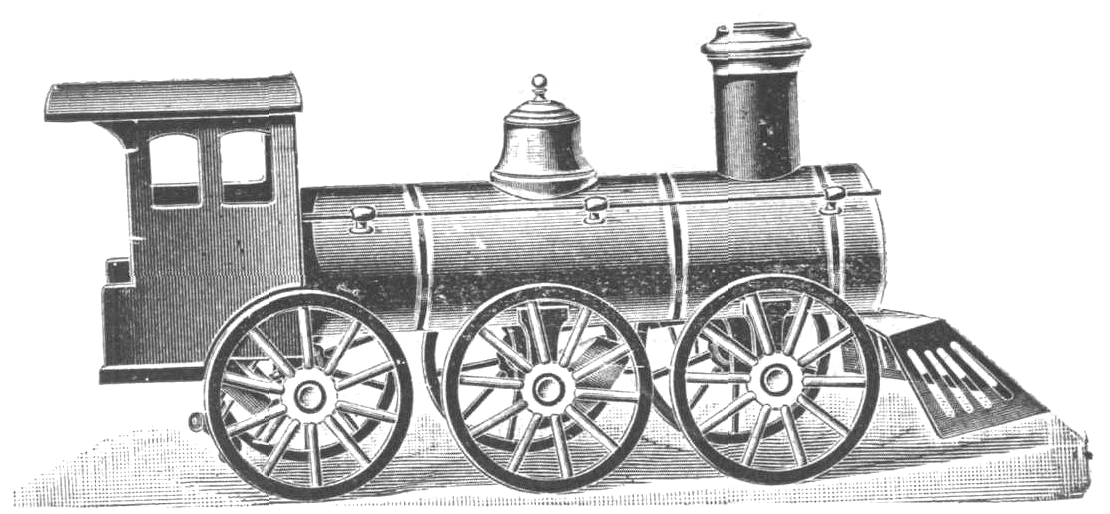
Mechanical tin toy locomotive with Gong Bell, as advertised in wholesale catalogue, 1900

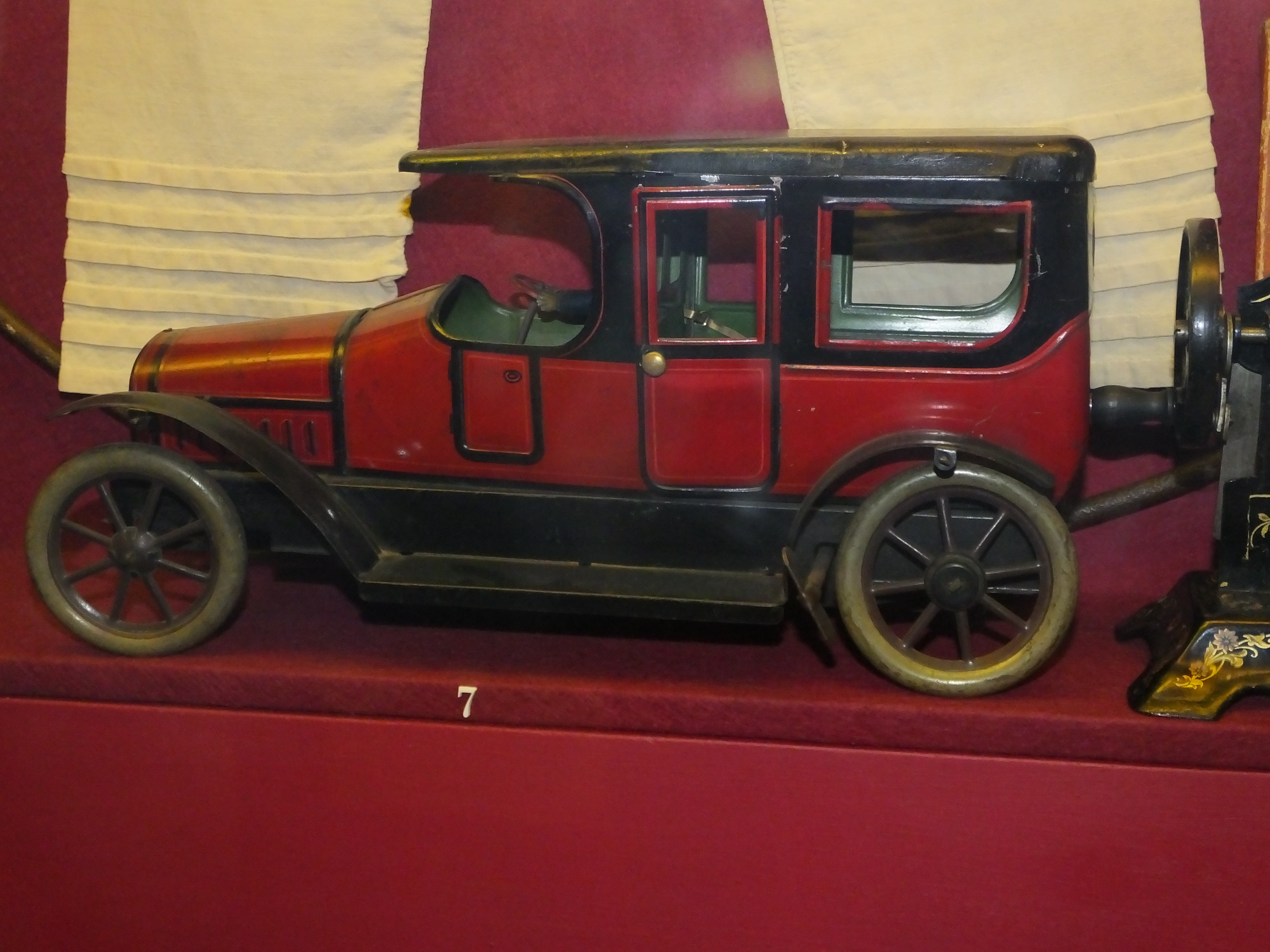
Toy tinplate limousine, 1916 Whiteley by Tansley & Co, Liverpool

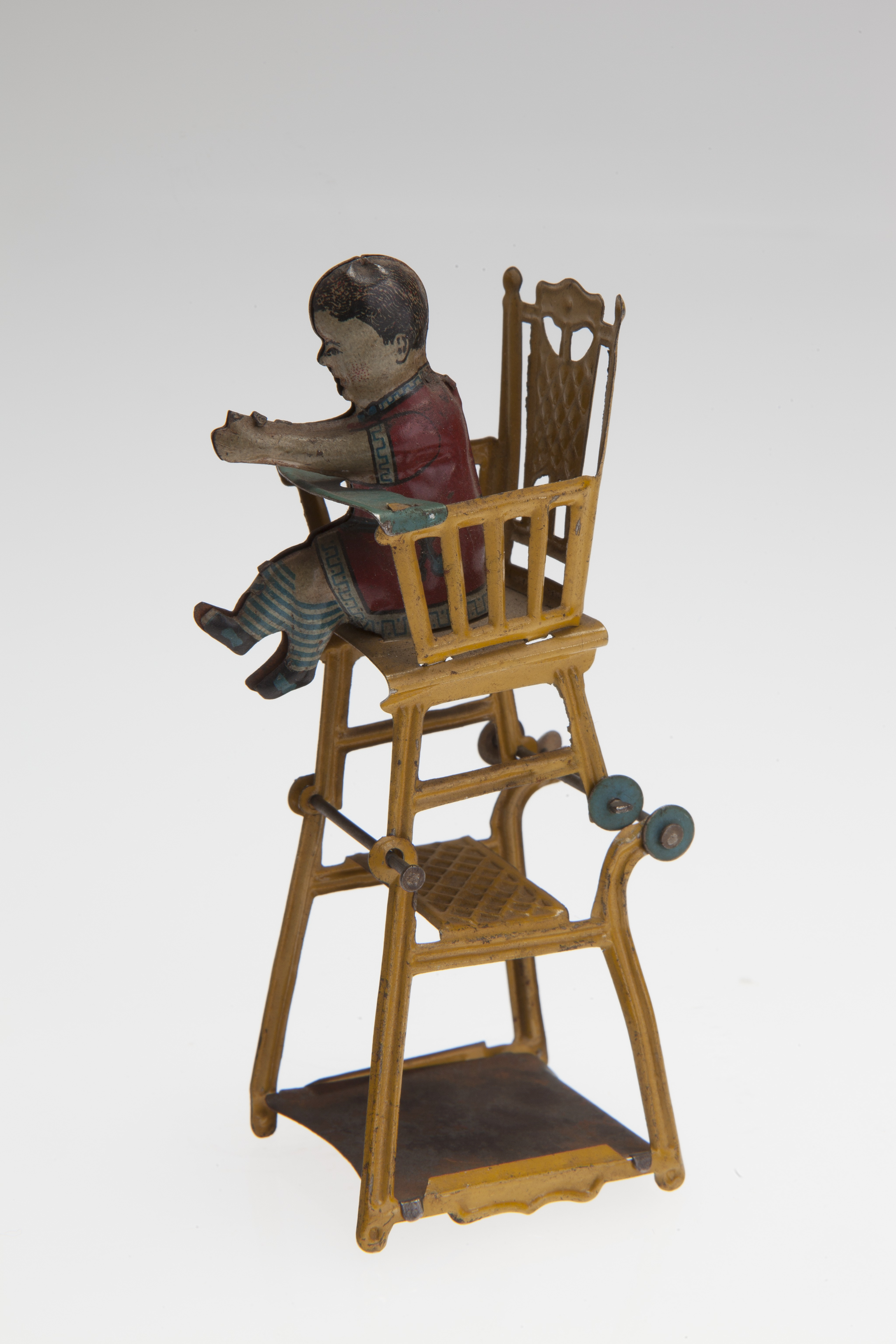
Baby in highchair, tin toy with moveable parts, German manufacture, before 1914

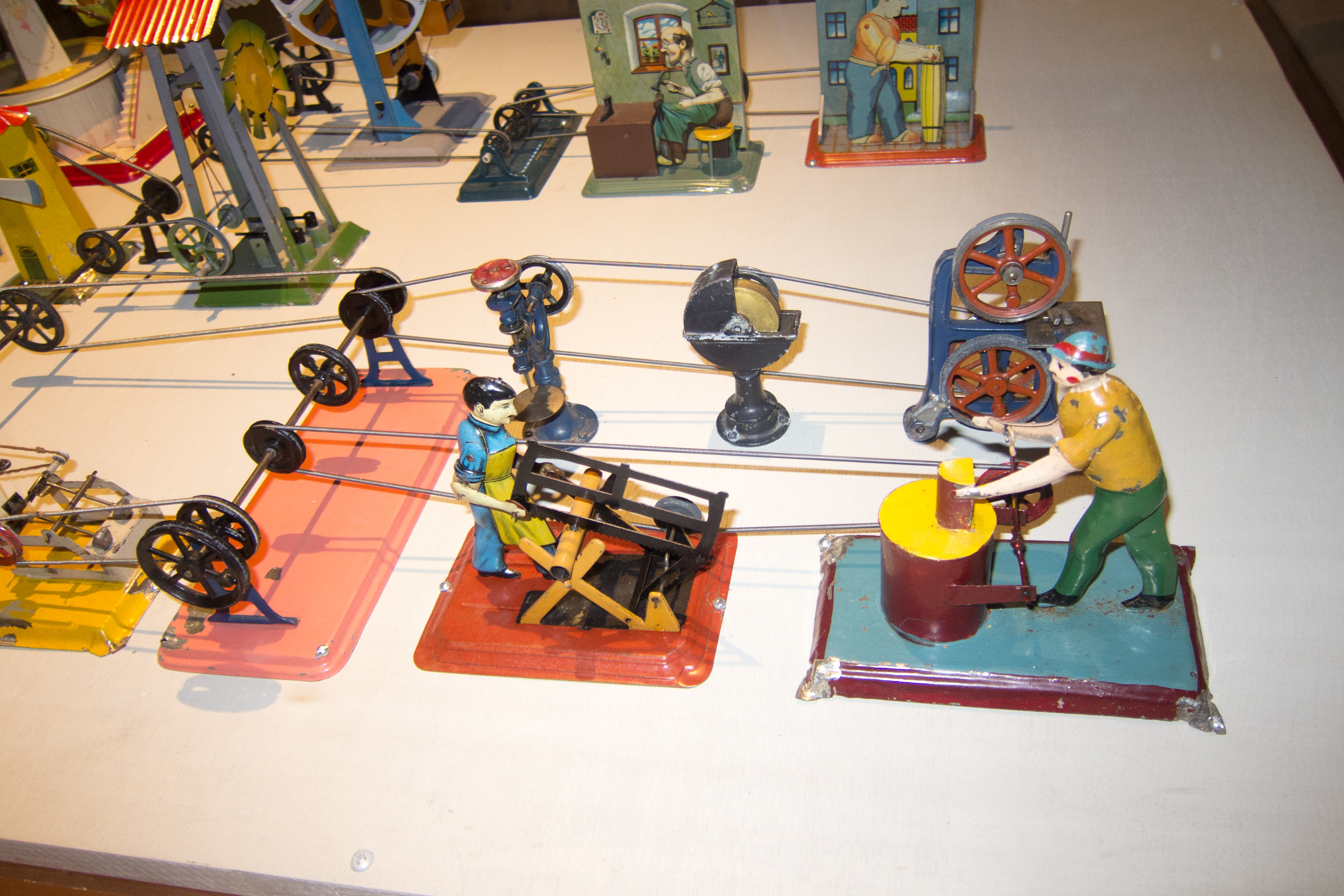
Collection of antique tin toys, n.d.

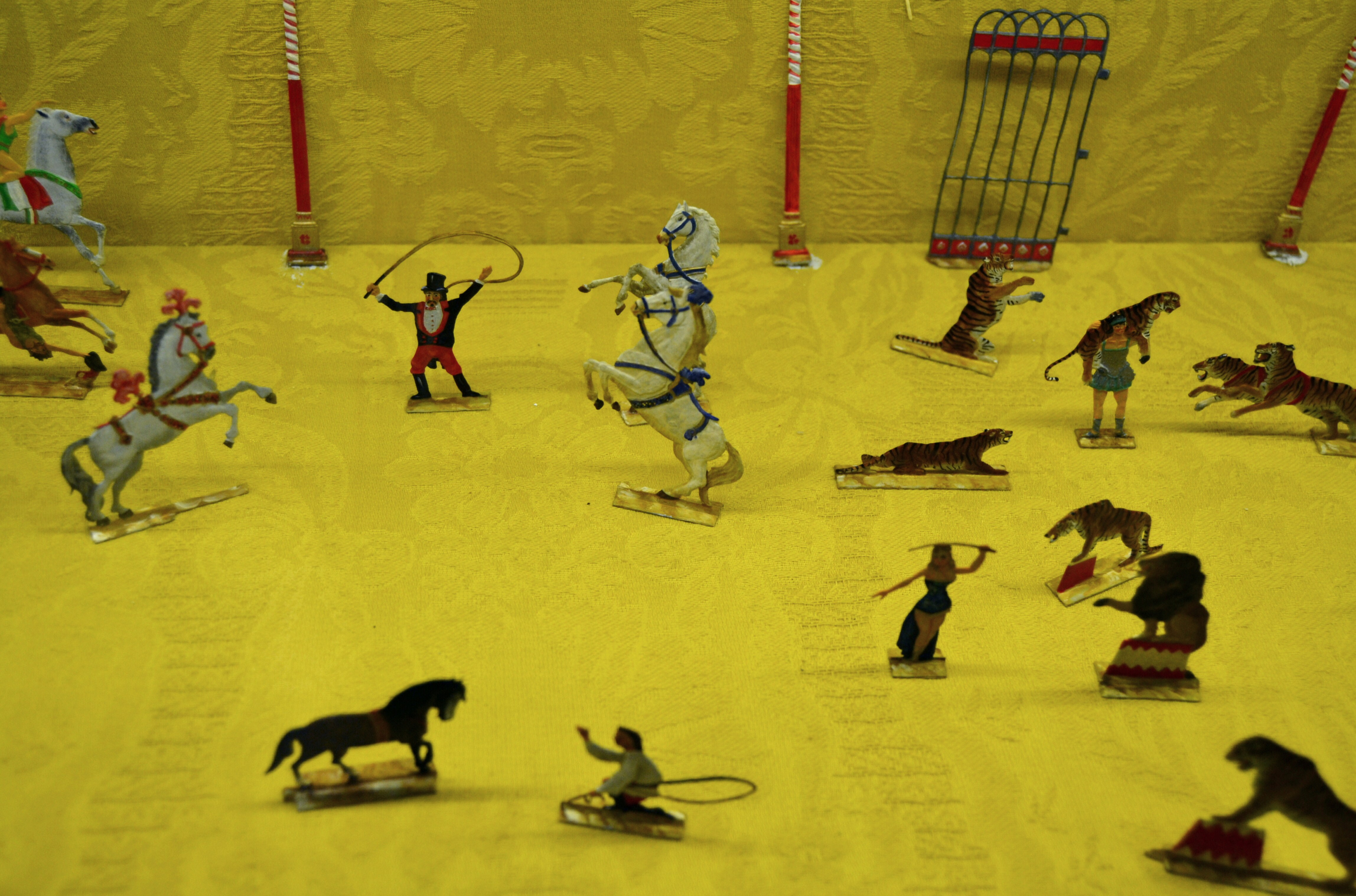
Tin flat Circus figures, Museo dels Soldadets de Plom l'Iber de València

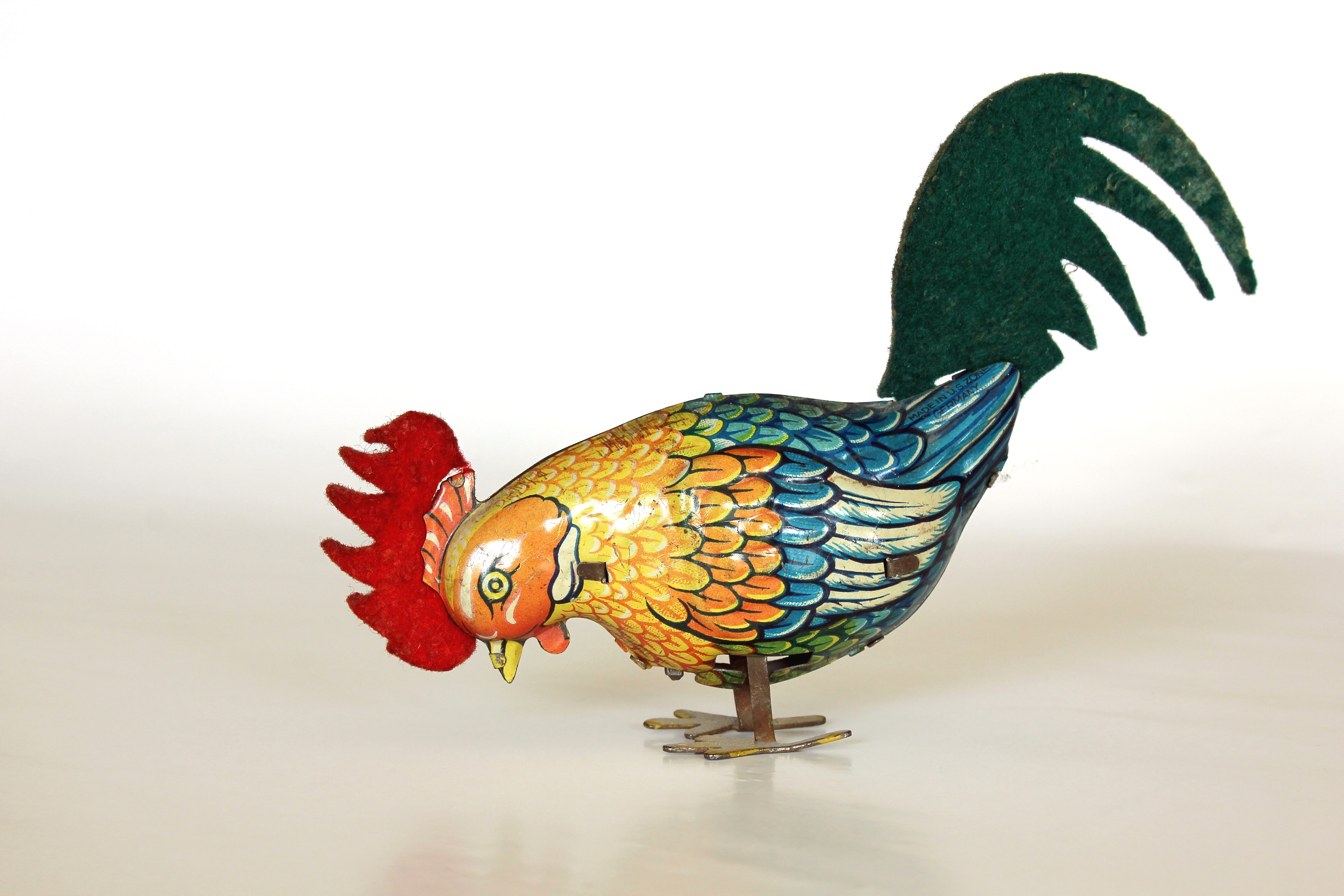
Toy rooster by GKN-Blechhahn, c. 1948

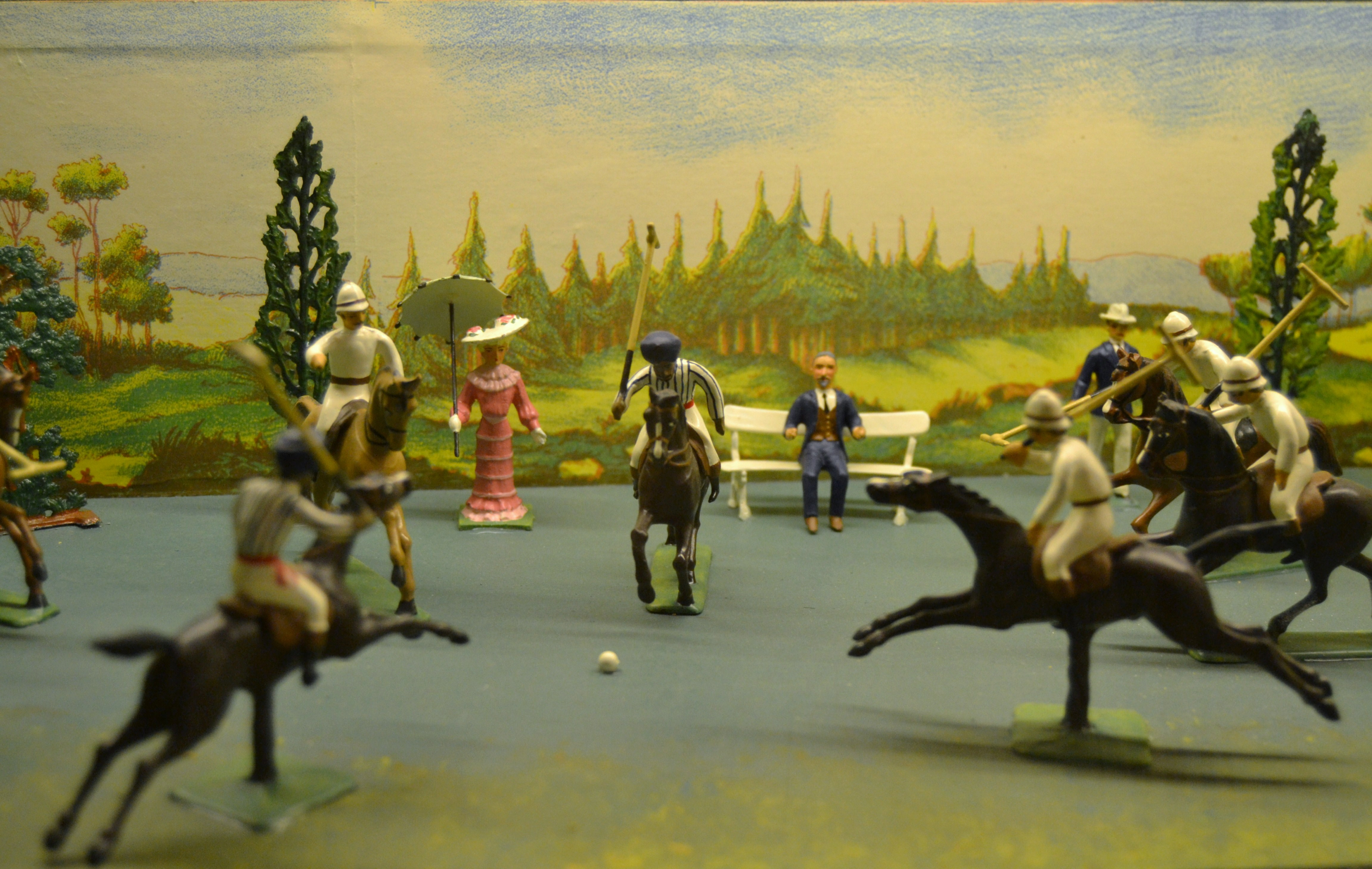
Toy polo players by GKN-Blechhahn, c. 1948

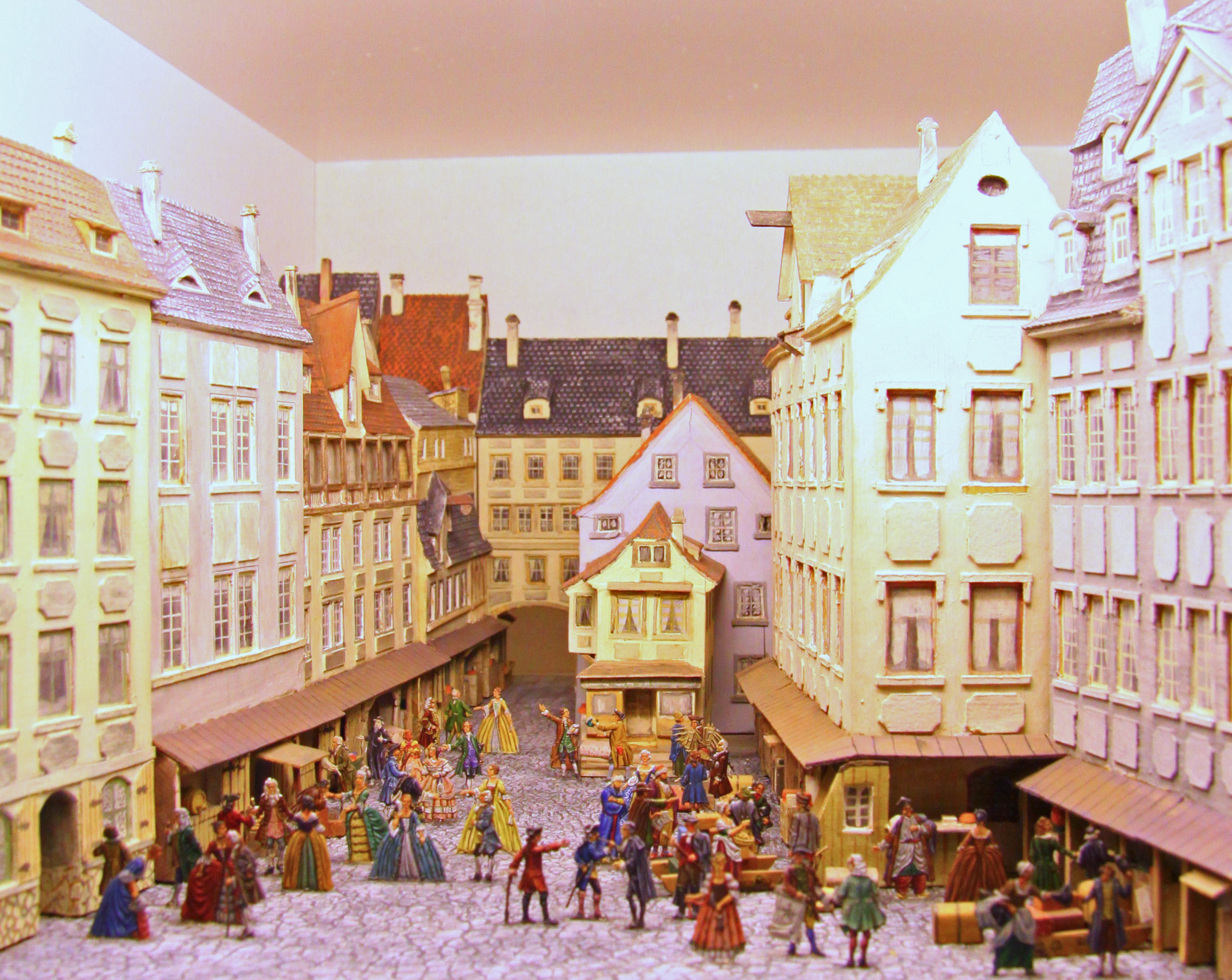
Diorama of Leipzig with tin figures, n.d., Stadtgeschichtliches Museum

== See also ==
- Penny doll - inexpensive china or bisque doll
- Pennywoods - inexpensive wooden dolls
- Tin toy
- Tin soldier
- Toy advertising
