= Metal House Robots =

Japanese toy company

Metal House Space Giant Robot

Metal House was founded as Marumiya in 1943; the company has produced some well-known tin toys. Especially familiar to collectors of battery-operated tin toy robots, the firm originally operated as a subcontractor producing toys for some of the most prolific Japanese toy companies such as Horikawa, Nomura, and Yonezawa during the post World War II heyday of tin toys.

A long list of popular toys were manufactured by Marumiya during this period. One of the earliest big successes in the mid-to late 1950s was Nomura's Zoomer Robot. A series of toys based upon the Robby the Robot character brought to life by MGM's 1956 movie Forbidden Planet such as Piston Robot and Mechanized Robot were also quite successful and are highly sought after today. Other well-known Horikawa toy robots include Smoking Spaceman, Machine Robot, Fighting Robot, and Attacking Martian, all of which were ground-breaking entries into the field with lengthy production runs.

Horikawa Star Strider

After enjoying a long run of non-stop growth from the late 1950s through the mid-1970s, the Japanese tin toy industry found the 1980s a difficult environment in which to survive. Changing tastes, lower-priced competition from other countries, and increasingly aggressive toy safety regulations all led to a massive downturn in the demand for tin toys. The majority of the companies who just a few years earlier were staple items found in the toy departments of nearly every popular price retailer across the globe were out of business by the end of the decade.

Space Evil or Mars Demon

After the last of Marumiya's key sources of business, Horikawa, closed in the late 1980s, Metal House was established in 1989. Many of Horikawas designs were carried over by Metal House including the Super Space Giant and Star Strider, both of which are in still in production today. The latter is notable for being Horikawa's last all-tin toy robot design. Both company names, Horikawa and Metal House, appear on the boxes for Star Strider robots produced during this transitional period. Additional products such as Space Evil* (packaged for but never actually sold under the brand name Bliking) share many things in common with their Horikawa ancestors from the 1960s/early 1970s.

A firm continues today under president Katsumasa Miyazawa. Metal House remains as the only traditional Japanese manufacturer of battery operated tin toy robots still in business today. Metal House maintains a loyal collector following worldwide by introducing new models on a regular basis.
