= Peg wooden doll =

Type of wooden doll

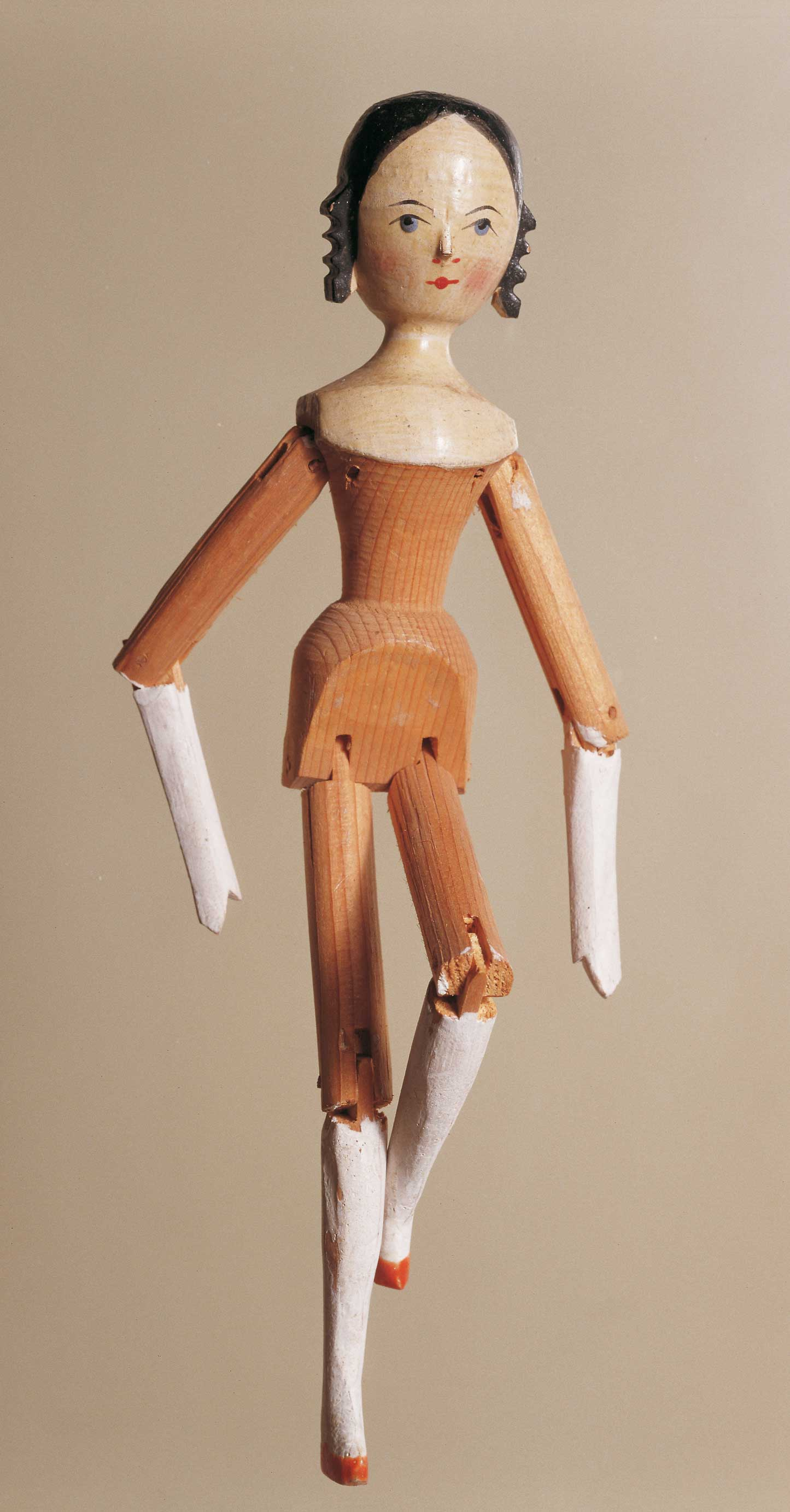
Peg wooden doll from Val Gardena, 1850

Peg wooden dolls, also known as Dutch dolls (German: Grödner Gliederpuppen), are a type of wooden doll from South Tyrol, Italy. They originated as simple lathe-turned dolls from the Val Gardena in the Alps. The name Pennywoods is also used for dolls of this type, in particular those made in the United States.

Peg wooden dolls were historically made by hand from inexpensive materials such as wooden pegs or small pieces of wood. They were typically dressed in clothes made from fabric scraps. This style of doll gained wide popularity during the Victorian era, and Queen Victoria owned peg dolls. These dolls waned in popularity during World War II because toy production halted in Europe.

== See also ==
- Frozen Charlotte (doll)
- Penny toy
