= Tin toy =

Mechanical toy made of tinplate

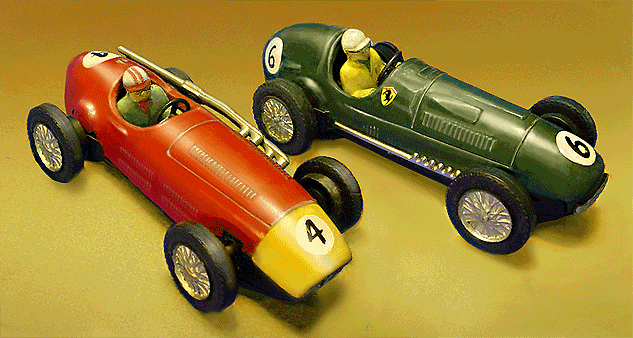
Tin cars circa 1957

A tin toy, or tin lithograph toy, is a mechanical toy made out of tinplate and colorfully painted by chromolithography to resemble primarily a character or vehicle.

== History ==
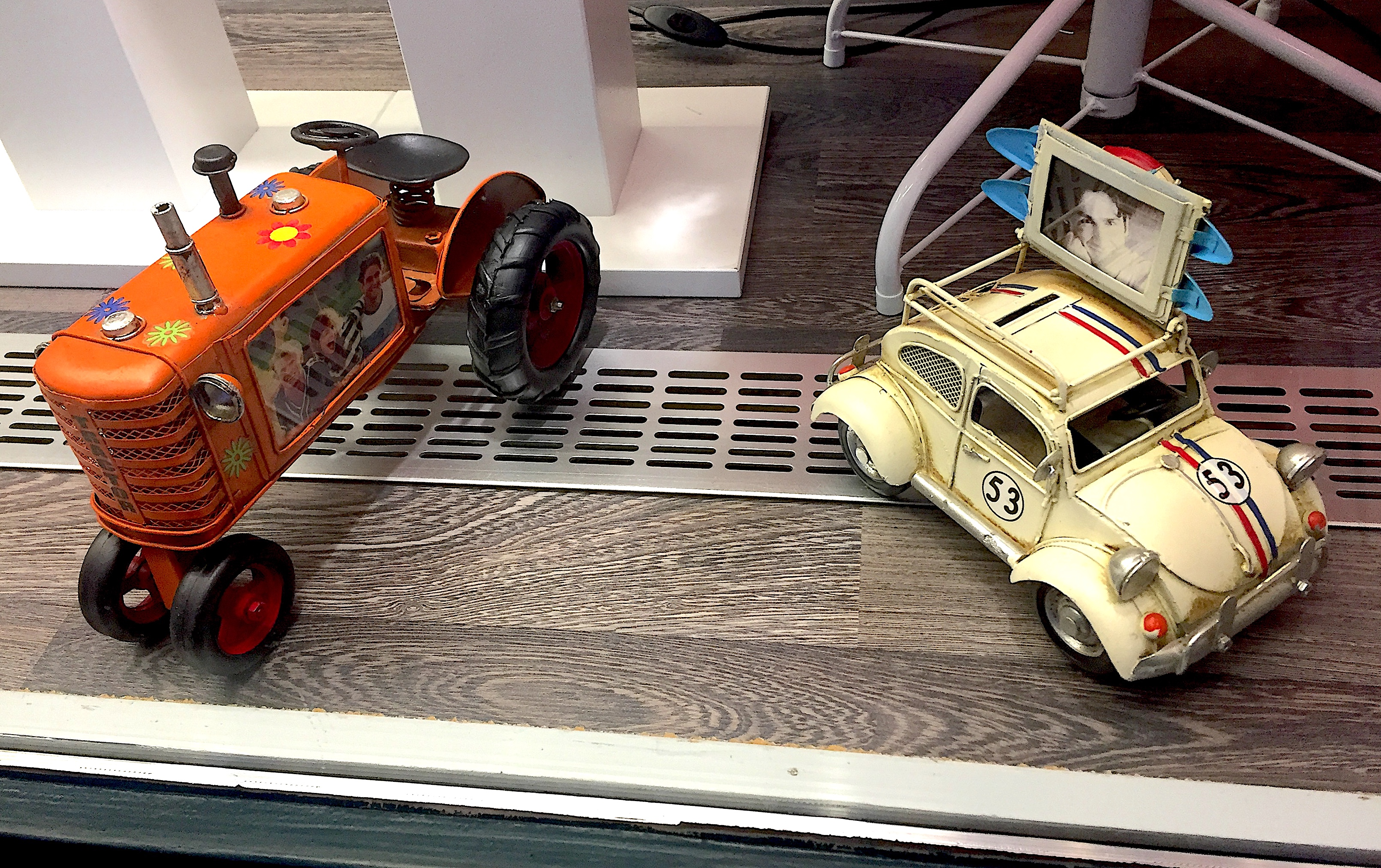
Tin toy vehicles with picture frame function

Tinplate was used in the manufacture of toys beginning in the mid-19th century. The invention of sheet metal stamping machines in 1815 allowed for the mass production of inexpensive toys. Tin toys were made from thin sheets of steel plated with tin, hence the name tinplate. Tin toys were a cheap and durable substitute for wooden toys. The toys were originally assembled and painted by hand. Spring-activated tin toys originated in Germany in the 1850s. In the late 1880s offset lithography was used to print designs on tinplate. After the colorful designs were printed on the metal, they were formed by dies and assembled with small tabs. The lightweight nature of the toys allowed them to be shipped less expensively and easier than the heavier cast iron toys.

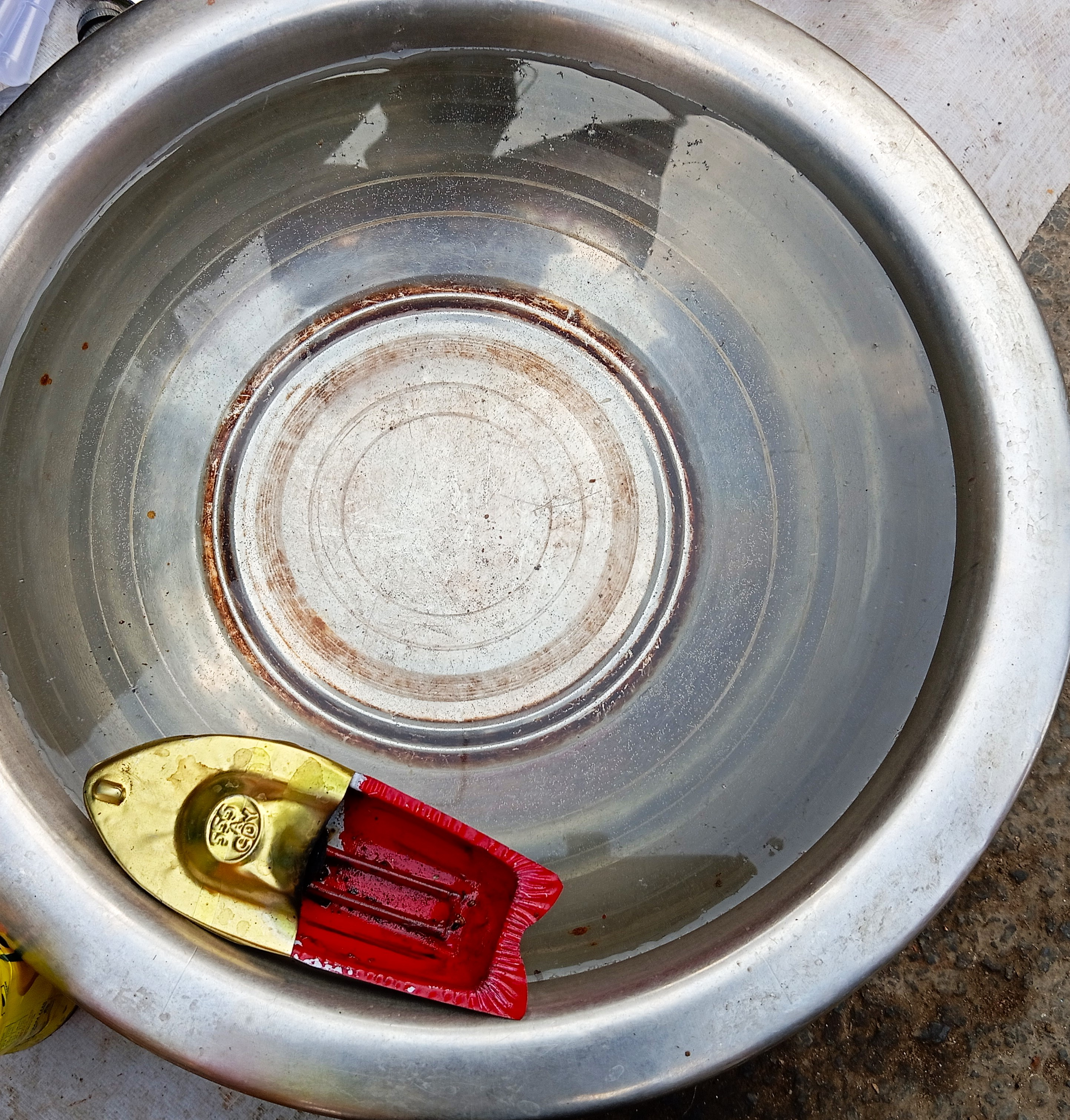
Tin toy boat

Germany was the major producer of tin toys in the world in the early 20th century. The most famous German manufacturer of tin toys was Ernst Paul Lehmann who is said to have exported 90% of his toys. France and England joined the fray and it wasn't long before hundreds of thousands of these penny toys were being manufactured. Production of tin toys in the United States started earlier, but began in earnest when tin ore mines were opened in Illinois providing easily available and cheap raw materials. A number of manufactures scrambled to catch up in the beginning of the 20th century, but it wasn't until after World War I, with anti-German sentiment high, that they began to make real gains. There was a growing demand for American produced products and by the 1920s American firms had overtaken the competition. The largest and most successful firm from the 1920s to the 1960s was Louis Marx and Company. Marx produced a huge number of designs and depended on large sales volumes to keep prices down.

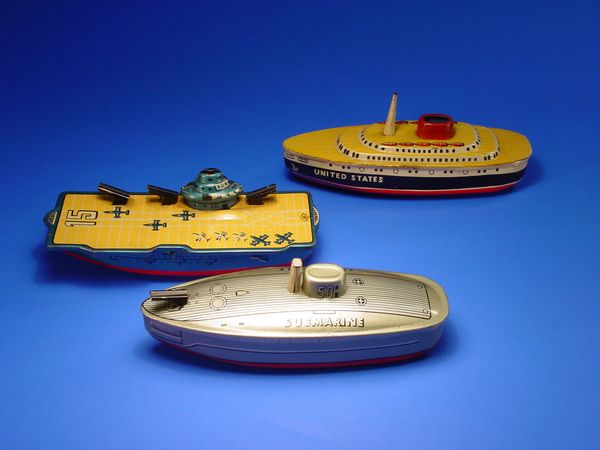
Aircraft carrier, cruise ship, and submarine made of tin

The production of tin toys was discontinued during World War II because of the need for raw materials in the war effort. After the war, tin toys continued to increase in popularity in England through Chad Valley toys and also were produced in large numbers in Japan. Under occupation, manufacturers in Japan were granted the right to resume production. The idea was to give Japan all of the low profit, high labor manufacturing, while US companies could sell the imported product. This worked better than expected, and Japan became a tin toy manufacturing force by the end of the 1950s. In the 1960s cheaper plastic and new government safety regulations ended the reign of tin toys. Presently, China has taken over the role of the leading tin toy manufacturing country.

== Tin toy robots ==
Tin toy robots are collected by toy enthusiasts. Models such as Mr. Atomic Robot and Robby the Robot from the movie Forbidden Planet can sell for several thousand dollars.

== See also ==
- Metal House Robots
- Penny toy
- Toy advertising
