= Practical joke device =

Prop or toy used for a prank

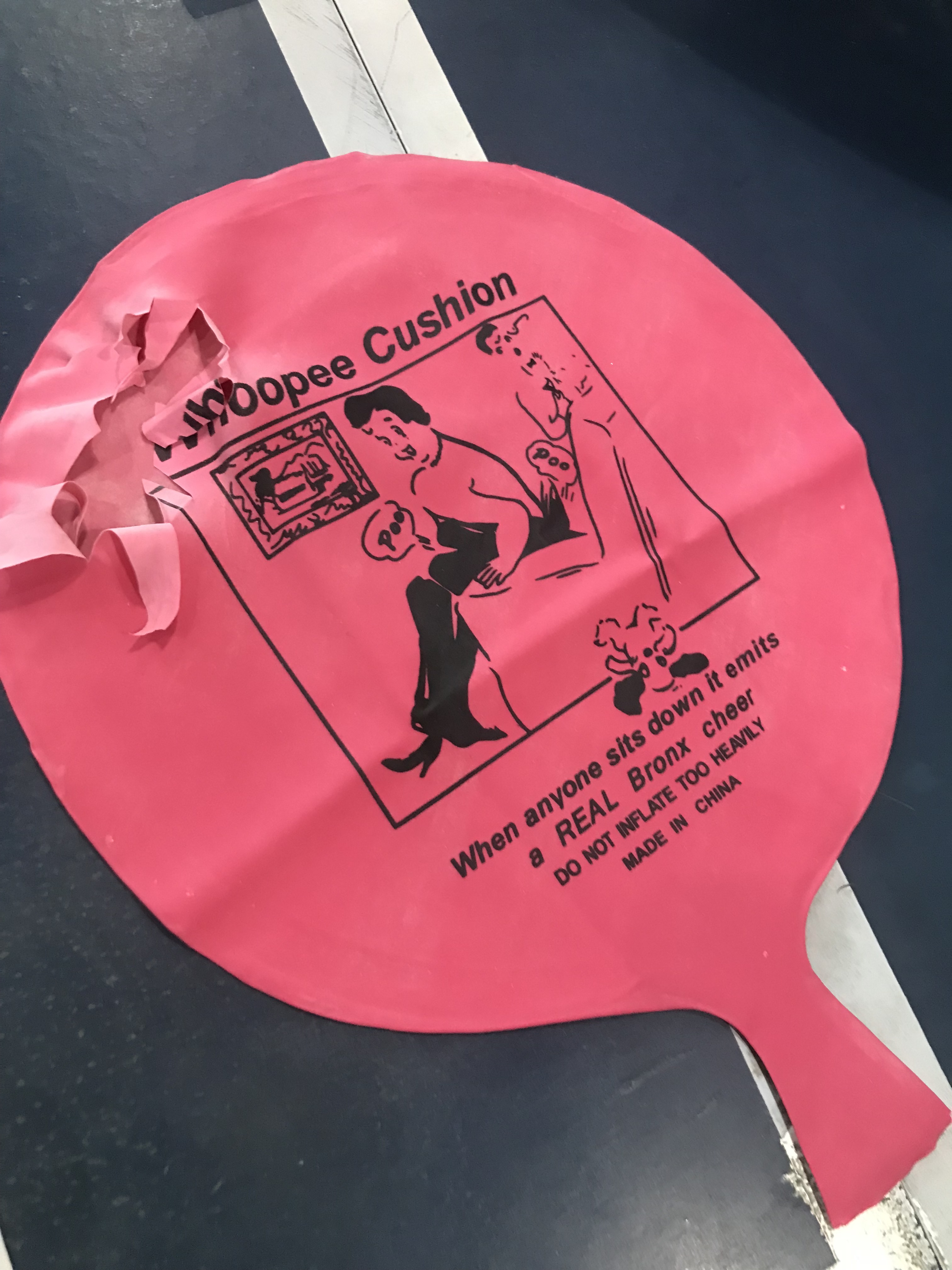
An overinflated whoopee cushion

A practical joke device is a toy intended to confuse, frighten, or amuse individuals as a prank. Often, these toys are harmless facsimiles of otherwise potentially disgusting or terrifying objects, such as vomit or spilled nail polish. In other instances, they are created as seemingly harmless items designed to humorously malfunction in such a way as to confuse or harm the target of a prank. The devices are frequently sold in magic or specialty shops, purchased over the Internet, or crafted for oneself.

Although commonly employed at events and gatherings, practical joke devices are sometimes seen in everyday life, for example as a mechanism of play by children, or among adult co-workers in a work environment. In addition to commercially manufactured practical joke devices, everyday objects have been converted into joke devices by purveyors of pranks.

== Types of practical joke devices ==
=== Body parts ===
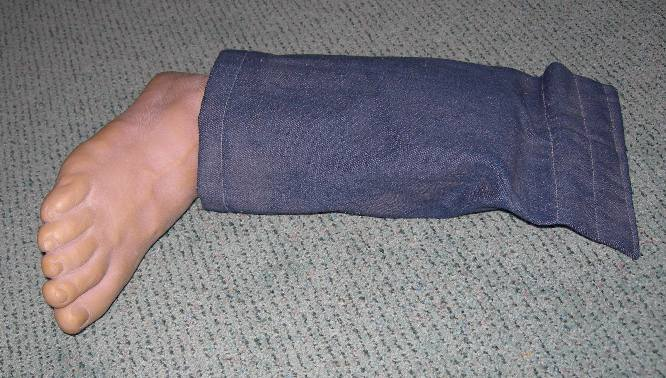
Fake leg

Artificial body parts can be, for example, attached on or under autos (to pretend as if someone's lost a limb after they're run over).

- Artificial arm, foot, or hand
- Jammed finger
- Oversized feet
- Protruding eyes (accessory or on glasses)

=== Clothing ===
- Scare masks (particularly ones made of latex)
- Scare teeth (such as Dracula teeth, monster teeth, yellow teeth) that are similar to dentures

=== Embarrassment ===
- Exhaust-pipe whistle tips (for the muffler of an auto)
- Fart machine (a remote-controlled battery-powered speaker that sets off sounds of various farts)
- Fart spray
- Itching powder
- Sneezing powder
- Whoopee cushion

=== Everyday objects ===
- Pen (with electric shock, or to set off a cap)
- Camera (with electric shock or squirting)
- Bitter candy (or e.g. with garlic flavor)
- Golf ball made of gypsum (shatters to powder when struck)
- Beer mug with enclosed liquid
- Dribble glass (drinking glass with hidden holes)
- Pythagorean cup (would spill liquid all over the person if they filled their cup too much)
- Pack of chewing gum (with smacking spring, squirting, electric shock, or to set off a cap)
- Water balloons
- Squeaking salt shaker
- Banana peels
- Foaming sugar cubes
- Ring (squirting)
- Telescope with ink on lens (leaves a black circle around the victim's eye after use)
- Snake nut can (looks like a can of nuts but has a spring snake inside, surprising the victim when opened)

=== Excrement ===
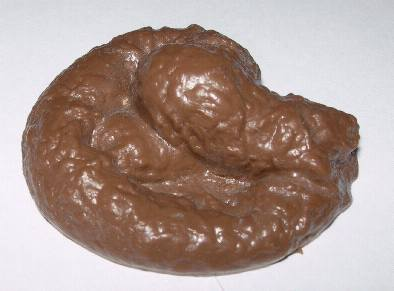
Fake excrement

- Fake excrement pile
- Fake vomit
- Snot (for attaching to the nose)
- Soiled diaper

=== Fake animals ===
- A fake shark's dorsal fin to appear to onlookers as a live shark pursuing a swimmer at a public beach or pool
- Vermin: mice, rats, snakes, spiders, worms, etc.
- Partial (or injured) stuffed toy animals
  - A stuffed-animal tiger's tail as a promotional gimmick for "a tiger in your tank" (Esso oil company slogan)
  - Partial animals such as a half cat, designed to appear so that the rest of the animal is trapped in a closed/latched door or storage compartment
  - Roadkill animals or fake remains of injured animals. One such "Dead Dog Prop", billed as a "foam filled latex prop of a skinned dog with large tire track squished through its mid torso, chain attached for dragging purposes," was pulled from Sears, Walmart and Amazon websites a few days before Halloween 2013.

=== Horror devices ===
- Arrow in head
- Arrow and fake blood
- Nail through finger or head
- Knife in head

=== Liquids ===
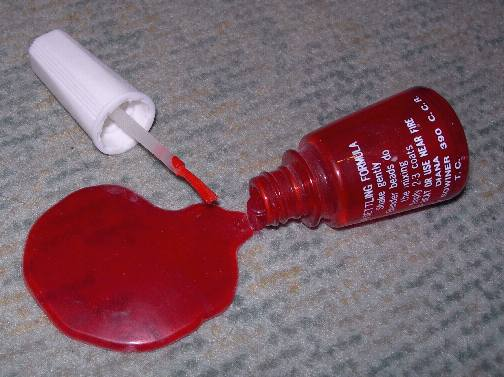
Nail polish

- Fake blood
- Magic ink (disappears after a short time)
- Stink bomb
- Broken egg with shell
- Fake spilled liquid with container, such as nail polish, chocolate syrup, red wine, etc.
- Squirting flower or camera

=== Smoking articles ===
- Lit cigarette lookalike device
- Bang-producing matches
- Exploding cigars
- Exploding cigarette inserts
- Cigarette burn sticker
- Squirting cigarette
- Lighters (with electric shock, squirting, or bang-producing)
- Everlasting ash (the ash does not fall off)

=== Toiletries ===
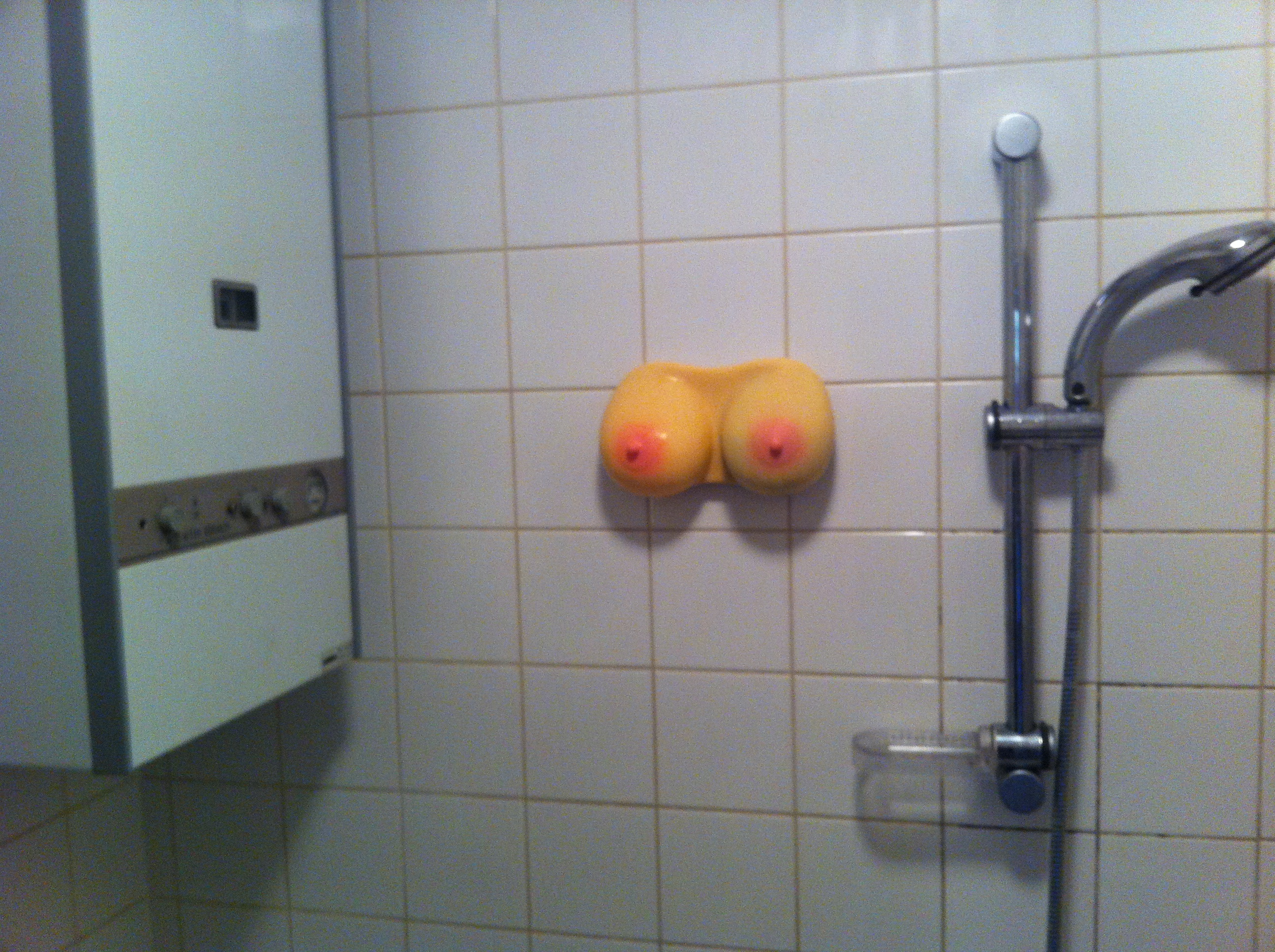
Breast-shaped shower gel/shampoo dispenser

- Novelty soap
  - Soot soap (turns hands black)
  - Blood soap
  - Butt/face soap (large bar soap one side white with the word "FACE" and the other side brown with the word "BUTT")
- Toilet paper
  - Printed slogans such as a John Wayne or Chuck Norris roll, "Rough, tough, and doesn't take poop from anybody"
  - No tear toilet paper
  - Various printed patterns: caution tape, crime scene tape, sandpaper, or cheese grater teeth

=== Documents and currency ===
- Fake lottery tickets
- Fake traffic tickets
- Fake or novelty currency
  - Coin glued to a sidewalk or bogus currency glued inside a toilet bowl where hapless finders will attempt to retrieve it.
  - Banknotes printed on one side only or one half of the page, so as to look valid when folded. Once unfolded, the remainder of the document is blank or carries a message or promotional advertisement
  - Fake denominations of currency such as the three dollar bill. The Smoking Gun reports a bogus-denomination $US200 depicting George W. Bush having been accepted at a Food Lion store; other reports list a Dairy Queen in Danville, Kentucky as a victim of this hoax. Another variant is the use of unrealistically large fictional denominations such as one million or a billion dollars.
  - Currency depicting recent incumbent politicians instead of historical leaders, usually casting them in an unfavourable light. A Pierre Elliott Trudeau "fuddle dollar" may identify itself as inflated and worthless currency, or a non-standard denomination featuring the presidential likenesses of Nixon, Bush, or Trump may present itself as unreliable, untrustworthy, or worthless as a means of parodying these figures.
  - Currency issued by fictional, defunct, or non-sovereign entities, such as a reprint of the now-worthless Confederate dollar or a parody "Quebuck" purporting to be issued by Québec separatists.
  - Currency issued on non-standard media (such as rubber "to stretch a dollar" or toilet paper as an implicit acknowledgement the money being parodied is worthless) or marked on its face as "funny money" issued by counterfeiters.
- Fantasy passports from fictional nations or planets.
- A bogus charge card entitled "Major Credit Card" and purporting to be "for major purchases only".
- A bogus charge card whose name and branding is a clear parody of an existing, well-known card and slogan. A Yakov Smirnoff book cover depicting a Russian version of American Express with slogan "Don't leave home" is one example.

=== Others ===
- Joy buzzer (hand buzzer)
- Bullet hole or glasscrack
- Covert TV Clicker (a miniature remote that controls TVs). These differ from standard universal remote controls in that they blindly, without interruption, send the turn-off code for every make of television in sequence. No attempt is made to determine which is the valid code or provide any useful control other than turning the TV off.
- Hot candy
- Cheap inflatable dolls. Inflatable sheep or goats are manufactured solely as a practical joke item.
- Pie (to be sat on or thrown at the face of a victim)
- Chinese finger trap (to get victim's fingers stuck)

== See also ==
- List of practical joke topics
- Novelty item
