= Toy advertising =

Promotion of toys through media

A 2019 television commercial for My Little Pony toys by Hasbro from the Friendship Is Magic era (2010–2021), containing lyrics that imply "collect[ing] them all" would allow customers to "join the rainbow squad", and starring exclusively female actors

Toy advertising is the promotion of toys through a variety of media. Advertising campaigns for toys have been criticized for trading on children's naïvety and for turning children into premature consumers. Advertising to children is usually regulated to ensure that it meets defined standards of honesty and decency. These rules vary from country to country, with some going as far as banning all advertisements that are directed at children.

== History ==
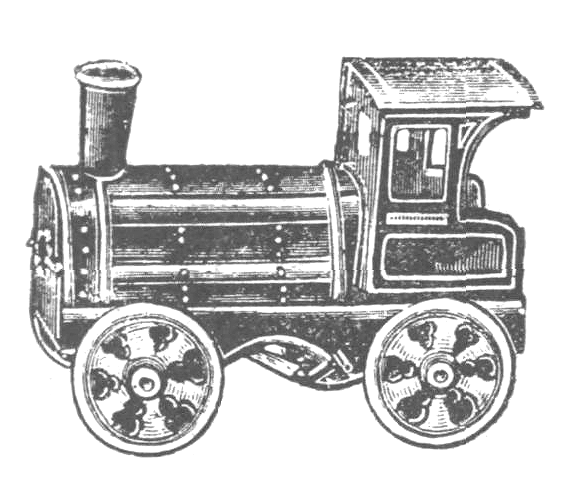
Mechanical Tin Toy Locomotive, as pictured in a 1900 wholesale catalog

The commercial sale and marketing of children's toys only became popular in the mid-18th century. Before this, children had access to relatively few toys, and of those toys in use, most were hand-made, either by the child or a close relative. Toys that were in common use from at least medieval times were basic items such as hoops, tops, balls, and dolls, which could be turned out by local carpenters or coopers. A scattering of toy shops traded in 17th-century London but were virtually unknown outside the capital. A small number of mechanical toys were imported from France and Germany, but these were expensive and beyond the reach of all but the wealthiest families.

A broader interest in children's toys and games coincided with the emergence of a middle class when fewer children were expected to work. The 18th-century attitude towards toys was that they should be educational. Accordingly, toymakers designed their products to prepare children for adult life. For example, a rocking horse taught children to balance and prepared them for horse riding. A doll prepared girls for motherhood and child-rearing, while toy soldiers taught young boys about the military. From the outset, commercially produced toys were remarkably gendered.

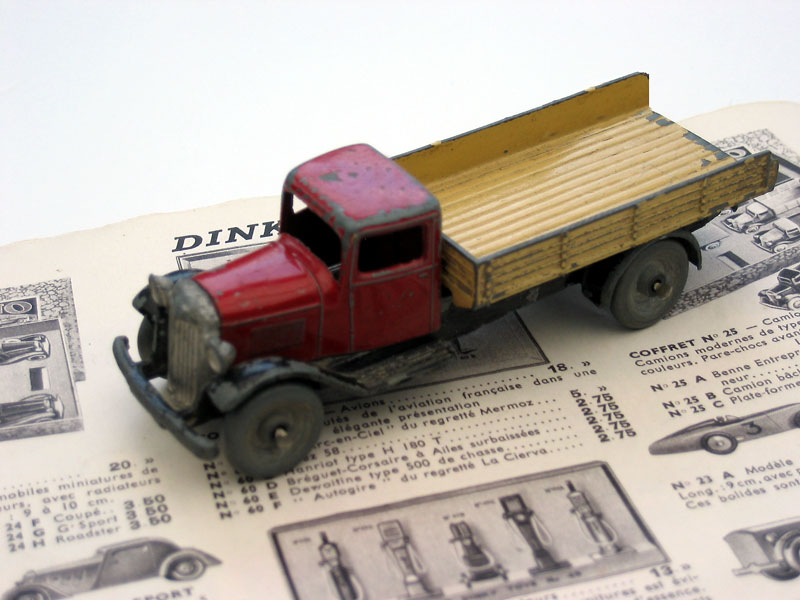
Dinky die-cast truck with a 1937 catalog

By the mid-19th century, technological developments such as the invention of sheet metal stamping machines facilitated the mass production of inexpensive toys, notably tin toys or penny toys. Other technological developments included the advent of paper mache and "India" rubber molding machines, which effectively lowered the costs of manufacturing dolls. To stimulate demand for toys, it was necessary to encourage parents to purchase them for their children. However, to do that, it was necessary to shift attitudes towards toys, to promulgate the idea that children were children rather than 'adults in training' and that toys were developmentally useful.

Toy manufacturers were latecomers to modern marketing and advertising techniques. The earliest commercial toymakers relied on standardized mass-production manufacturing techniques, with an emphasis on achieving economies through long production. Designs and models were rarely changed. Toy design was conservative and always aimed at securing parent approval. Toymakers rarely attended the international exhibitions. Early advertising appeared in wholesale and retail catalogs, where advertisements appeared alongside mousetraps and match holders. Advertising messages were targeted at parents and spoke of the toy's educational value as well as its durability. Toy advertising rarely showed children using the toys. The tenor of toy advertising and marketing was that adults decided what toys were appropriate for children.

Demographic and social changes were beginning to affect attitudes toward toys and children's play throughout the 19th century. The decreasing size of families meant that children had fewer siblings and that toys became an important diversion and source of entertainment. Rising living standards and wages meant that parents had more disposable income. Middle-class children remained in education for longer periods, with the implication that they had less time to make their own toys and were more reliant on commercially manufactured toys. By the late 19th century, parents were beginning to appreciate the special needs of childhood and that toys were more than just preparation for the real world; they could also offer a retreat from mundane realities.

In the 1890s and early 1900s, a toy trade press emerged on both sides of the Atlantic. In England, the Toy Trades Journal first appeared in March 1891; the Sports Trader appeared in 1907; and the short-lived Games, Toys and Amusements journal appeared in 1908. In America, Playthings magazine was launched in 1902. These trade-oriented journals began to publish articles advising toymakers and toy retailers on methods for optimizing sales of children's toys.

By the late 19th century, toymakers were beginning to adopt modern marketing practices. Manufacturers and distributors began using mail-order catalogs to reach consumers directly. Montgomery Ward, for example, produced a catalog listing 23,000 items, including toys. The new department stores began to include toys in window displays in which goods were featured as part of an artistic fantasy. Toymakers began to develop a unique style or personality that could be linked to a company name or brand. Advertising for toys began to appear in consumer magazines. Advertising messages encouraged mothers to take their children shopping with them and to watch how they interacted with toys in order to identify the child's preferences.

By the mid-20th century, the traditional approach of marketing through mothers (also known as the "gatekeeper model") was waning. Children, who by this time were the recipients of pocket money, made individual purchasing decisions as part of their education in the world of consumption. Television broadcasting in the mid-20th century provided toymakers with the ability to reach national children's audiences. In the late 20th century, the merchandising of film and TV characters in the form of dolls or figurines gave toy marketers access to international audiences.

== Campaign strategies and intentions ==
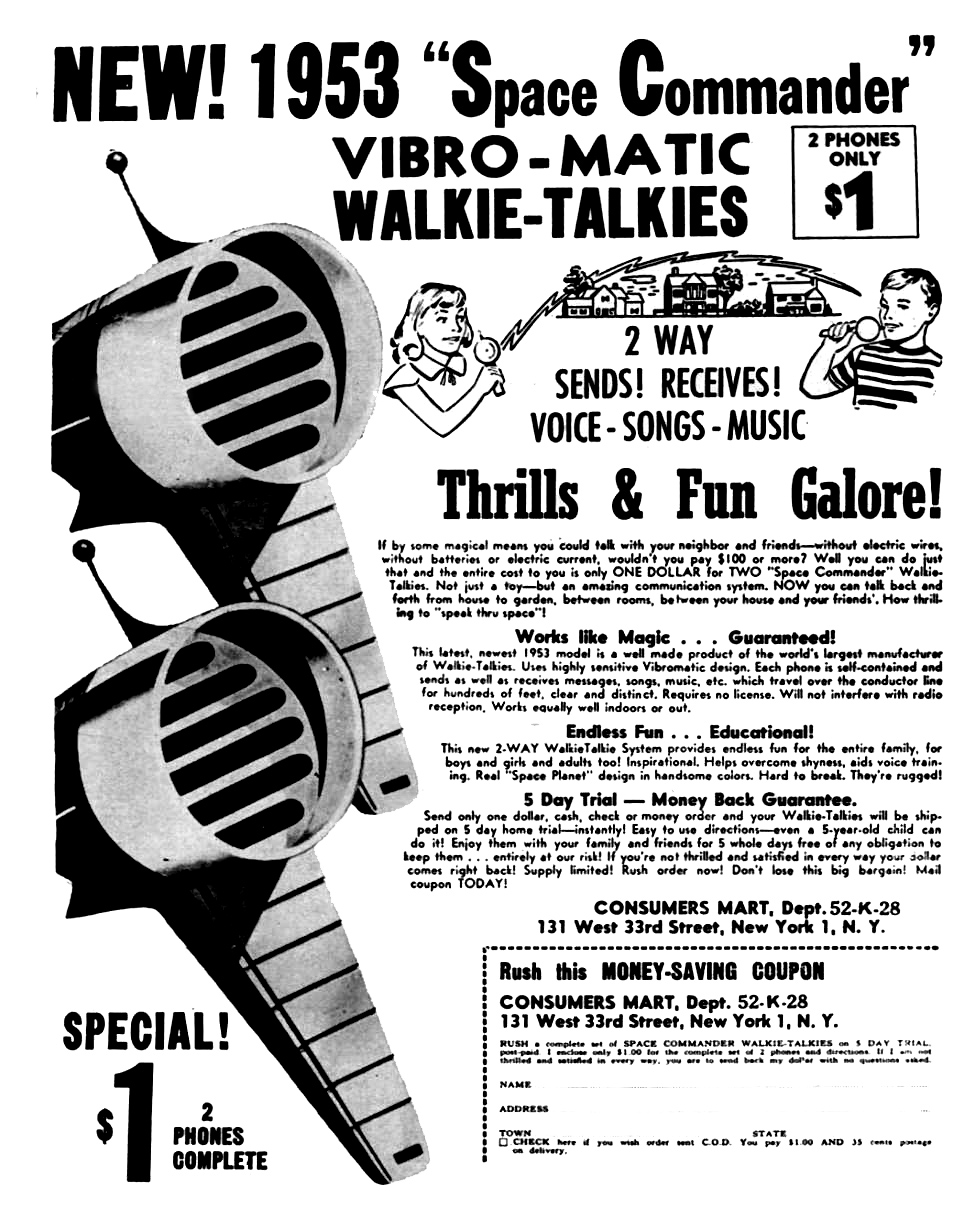
During the post-war period, toys were frequently advertised through comic books and children's magazines.

Toy advertisements are aimed at three target audiences: children, adults (especially close relatives such as parents or grandparents), and toy retailers. Different messages and media strategies are used for each target group. To gain the attention of children, advertising messages might focus on products with brightly colored, fast-moving designs or associations with heroic characters from film, TV, or books. Packaging can enhance the attractiveness of a toy. When advertising toys to adults, the educational benefits to the child are often promoted. When promoting toys to retailers, the ability of a product range to generate store traffic and profits is likely to be mentioned.

Children up to the age of five can find it difficult to distinguish between the main program and commercial breaks. This holds particularly true when a toy range is linked to a television series they are watching. Many children do not understand the intentions of marketing and commercials until the age of eight. Media literacy programs such as Media Smart are being used to help children understand and think critically about advertising.

Children are not easily persuaded to want something. Advertising is only part of the picture. Children's interests in a particular toy are likely to arise from word of mouth and peer pressure. Two-year-olds spend about 10% of their time with other children. This rises to 40% between ages 7 and 11. The term "pester power" refers to children nagging their parents to buy a product. Some children will repeatedly ask them to buy a toy they want, and such insistence often leads to a purchase. There is a regulation in place that bans advertisements from directly exhorting children to buy advertised products or persuade their parents to buy the products. Advertisers sometimes try to stimulate word-of-mouth promotion of products.

Many toys are directed towards one specific sex, and advertising is tailored to meet their particular needs. There are biological as well as social and cultural reasons for boys' and girls' different toy preferences.

Like other consumer products, toys may also be offered as sets. While each one may be affordable, it may be an investment to "collect them all".

=== Intentions ===
The natural credulity of young children means that advertising to children is almost always a sensitive issue. The average child is exposed to approximately 40,000 commercials a year. These messages are channeled through television, the internet, billboard campaigns, and print media. Toy marketers are also known for their more direct approaches, targeting schools. Doing so by producing toys that are advertised with educational benefits throughout primary school catalogs and news letters. A study on child advertising conducted in December 2007 examined the relationship between television commercials and children's requests to Father Christmas. Throughout the findings, there was a significant correlation between the items requested and the commercials viewed. Proportionally, a greater number of brands were requested when associated with higher television viewing times. These findings reflect the impact marketers have on children. Through the use of advertising, brands are shaping the opinions and beliefs of young children every day, thus generating an unrelenting appetite for branded merchandise. The intentions of toy manufacturers are to influence children while they are young to gain brand loyalty, generating consumers for the future. Marketing strategies for advertising to children are paid high attention to as the market adds approximately 21 billion dollars to the United States economy each year. This is possible due to the influential amount of purchasing power children have when pressuring their parents, through what marketers refer to as "pester power".

=== Consequences ===
Persuasive commercials achieve such proportionate amounts of revenue, as children under the age of 12 have less cognitive ability to recognize the purpose of the advertisement. Brands sell a lifestyle, presenting to children the idea of happiness. Children at a vulnerable age believe that the lifestyle being sold to them is the truth, and by obtaining the products viewed, they will mirror these impressions. The mindset that purchase equals an acquired identity can be dangerous. It can present low self-esteem amongst youth because their reality is compromised by materialism. The Journal of Social and Clinical Psychology conducts a model proving the relationship between materialistic values, compulsive buying tendencies, self-discrepancies, and low self-esteem acts in a spiraling effect. This is due to the fundamentals of human nature, which involve an endless amount of wants which contrast against a disappointing reality. An example of this is Barbie, who is globally advertised as a best friend for young women. In commercials, Barbie comes to life, portraying personality. Marketers use idealistic settings to falsely advertise the lifestyle that comes with Barbie, either on the beach or in a nightclub. Settings are designed to convince children of this idealistic reality and an experience that they too can share with her. Yet, in reality, Barbie's potential relies on a child's imagination. The setting is not included. Mainly, she has no relatable characteristics for children to look up to, establishing the argument of social pressures and self-esteem. For toy companies, however, this is parallel to revenue.

=== Targeting gender ===
Many companies selling toys also target children based on their gender. This is done in a variety of ways, such as by exclusively showcasing toys in separate aisles depending on the intended gender or placing images of boys or girls on a certain product. Children begin to develop stereotypical, gender-based knowledge during preschool, and by the age of seven, they have strong, established views on toy gender. Research found that when children aged seven to eleven were asked to choose a toy, most selected traditional gender-based occupational toys, reflecting role play. Furthermore, studies have shown that children (boys and girls) between the ages of 3 and 11 held negative evaluations of boys violating gender roles involving physical appearance, with the concept of boys wearing girls’ clothing being equated as being almost as bad as the concept of theft. Overall, many similar gender norm violations by boys are also considered more negative than when girls violate norms, such as wearing clothes intended for boys or having short hair.

=== Beauty standards ===
Many toys help produce and reinforce beauty standards, particularly through toys such as dolls and beauty products targeted at girls and young women. Eurocentric beauty standards dominate representation in popular media and toy marketing in many places around the world. Common features emphasized in these images are white people or characters with fair or tanned skin, tall and slender bodies, thin waists, and long blonde hair. Such features are widely associated with beauty, simultaneously creating associations between darker skin and unattractiveness and, in the process, creating and reinforcing existing racial hierarchies within beauty ideals. The impacts of Eurocentric representation and beauty ideals also go even further than children's toys. Research has shown that black influencers on social media platforms typically receive lower salaries and experience greater difficulty arranging or receiving sponsorships and brand deals, as well as widely facing slower rises to popularity on social media compared to white influencers, contributing to the overall lack of representation in beauty-related media.

From digitally editing a model's skin to resemble the plasticity of a doll or promising young girls that they can achieve the perfect, unblemished appearance if they follow a certain makeup routine, the features of toys such as the Barbie doll are idealized and branded in popular culture and media. Advertisements for beauty and makeup-related toys targeting girls often promote products by using phrases such as "get perfect skin", a marketing strategy that instills the belief that those who use these products will achieve a Barbie doll or princess-like appearance that is widely considered ideal. However, many toy companies have made attempts to expand their definitions and representations of beauty by creating dolls and characters from diverse backgrounds. Products such as Bratz and American Girl include dolls of different races and ethnicities, providing more children with characters they can relate to.

Despite their efforts, however, both American Girl and Bratz have faced some criticism since their creations. For instance, the American Girl dolls are only offered in a few ethnicities, and the individualized personal narratives that accompany each doll represent a contrast between the European and non-European dolls. For example, based on their narratives, the Mexican immigrant doll, Josefina, who is deeply tied to her ethnic and cultural roots, would have a harder time adjusting to new environments compared to the Swedish immigrant doll, Kristen. Bratz dolls have also garnered criticism from cultural critics who claim that the over-sexualization of their race and clothing serve to promote and reinforce the otherness of minorities.

Many toy manufacturing companies have also expanded representation beyond able-bodied ideals by creating dolls with disabilities. The British toymaker, Makies, has a line of customized dolls with disabilities, including dolls with hearing and walking aids, as well as guide dogs. The online toy store Lime Tree Kids provided representation of individuals with Down syndrome in its line of "Baby Dolls with Down Syndrome". Taking a similar approach to their popular Barbie brand, Mattel has also created dolls with disabilities, namely the "Share-a-Smile-Becky", who was introduced as Barbie's friend in 1997. Becky was designed to have a pink and purple wheelchair, and in the years following its creation, Becky was transformed into various different characters with a wheelchair, such as a school photographer and Paralympic. Despite the popularity of the doll, it was discontinued due to its inability to fit into Barbie's world, such as in the Barbie DreamHouse, as a result of Becky's wheelchair. In 2019, Mattel launched a new and improved doll that allowed for increased inclusivity compared to Becky with its wheelchair-accommodating dolls of all body types and its own ramp, which granted accessibility in the Barbie DreamHouse.

=== Product placement ===
Effective advertising strategies also heavily involve product placement, in which a business pays for its products to be included in a film or television program. A theory suggests that the limited cognitive process that occurs when a child engages in television inflicts a feeling of familiarity to stimulate preference. Toy Story, an all-time famous Pixar movie, was produced in association with toy makers. Minor characters in the movie were based on real-life toys (Mr. Potato Head, Slinky Dog, and Etch A Sketch) whose original sales needed refreshing. After the release of the film in 1995, the sales of the toys featured in the Toy Story movie skyrocketed. In correlation, the Disney movie Frozen is a franchise within itself, generating a net worth of $2.25 billion. Disney has capitalized on the film's wide audience by constructing a profitable franchise supplying Frozen character dolls, teddies, lunch boxes, clothing, duvet covers, and more. According to Dave Hollis, executive vice president for distribution at Walt Disney Studios, Disney had troubling marketing to males. To overcome this, Disney found that boys respond more to humor; therefore, Olaf, the comedic Snowman, was advertised as much as the two female lead characters were. The success of this strategic marketing was reflected in the exit polls, which showed that 43% of the audience during the opening weekend were in fact male. Using this particular advertising strategy, Disney, in theory, doubled their targeted audience.

=== Celebrity and character endorsement ===
The influence of famous characters in commercials blurs the lines between programs and advertisements. An example from the journal Children as Consumers explains how celebrity endorsements in commercials have positive effects on a child's response throughout the sales of toy cars. Cross-promotions of businesses heavily involve celebrity and character endorsements. For ten years, Disney worked in collaboration with McDonald's, promoting the latest Disney films throughout the McDonald's Happy Meals. The connection between toys and fast food for young children creates a fun experience. As evident in the American Academy of Pediatrics journal, 20% of fast food restaurant advertisements now mention a complementary toy in their ads. The consequence of this illusion, that fast food is fun, holds businesses accountable for exploiting children and contributing to the global epidemic of child obesity. One in three children are classed as obese throughout New Zealand alone.

In 2019, the highest‑earning YouTube channel was Ryan's ToysReview (now Ryan's World), which featured then-eight‑year‑old Ryan Kaji unboxing various toys. In a complaint to the Federal Trade Commission, watchdog group Truth in Advertising accused the channel of producing “sponsored videos that often have the look and feel of organic content,” further alleging that approximately 90 percent of the channel’s videos included at least one paid product recommendation aimed at preschoolers who were “too young to distinguish between a commercial and a review.”

=== Toy premiums, games, and collectibles ===
Contest and giveaway prizes are effective practices marketers use to entice children and increase sales. Cereal companies are renowned for contest and giveaway prizes directly targeted at children. Similar to fast food, cereal companies generate excitement around their brand through the use of toys and games. Competition-based advertising can increase sales traffic as consumers believe the more they buy, the higher their chances of winning are. This is also effective when the prized toy is a mystery and children have to buy the product to find out what it is. An example of this is the Weetbix All Black campaign, where Weetbix released All Black collector cards. Weetbix was able to engage their targeted audience, young boys, to want to purchase Weetbix so they could get the nationally loved rugby team's trading cards. Collecting and trading the cards also enhances social benefits for young children. By using reward schemes, Weetbix has encouraged children to choose a healthier cereal for breakfast. This is counteractive to competitive sugar-based cereal brands, thus benefiting both Weetbix and children.

=== Exclusive kids only ===
Marketers have been known to entice children through the use of exclusion. By directly advertising products as 'kids only', it makes the experience feel special. This type of advertising is common throughout food companies, promoting that this drink or snack is just for kids, making it immediately more engaging. Trix, an all-time favorite American cereal, has a slogan that reads, "Silly rabbit, Trix are for kids." Promoting the impression of exclusion and importance.

== Packaging ==
Toys are advertised in shops and on product packaging. The color on the packaging of a children's toy is often carefully selected in order to appeal to a certain demographic. The educational benefits of toys are also explained on the packaging for the benefit of parents. Skills that a child will gain, such as hand–eye coordination, exploration, and problem-solving, are made explicit.

== Channels of advertising ==
Common methods of advertising include:

- Comic book advertisement
- Television commercial campaigns
- Print media campaigns
- Billboard campaigns
- Product placement in films and television programs
- Various forms of branding, including clothing
- Online marketing
- New media

The first televised toy commercial to be shown in the United States was for Hasbro's Mr. Potato Head in 1955. Since then, television has been one of the most important media for marketing toys.

The expansion of the Internet has created new opportunities for advertisers, and new strategies have been developed to adapt to new media technology environment. Now integrated into youth culture, new technologies enable marketing campaigns to reach children in a different way. Interactive games are a new medium that can be used to advertise toys to children.

== Regulation ==
In response to the perceived dangers of advertising to children, some countries and districts have highly regulated or even banned these marketing avenues. In Sweden, all advertisements aimed at children under the age of 12 have been banned, and Sweden unsuccessfully lobbied the European Union to do the same. Similarly, Quebec's Consumer Protection Act includes provisions to ban print and broadcast advertising aimed at children under the age of 13.

Advertising impact can be lessened if parents and teachers talk to children about the purpose and nature of advertising.

== See also ==
- Advertising management
- Advertising in video games
- Girls' toys
- History of marketing
