= Liquid Ass =

Stink bomb product for practical jokes

Liquid Ass (stylized as Liquid ASS) is a stink bomb product. It was invented by former engineer Allen Wittman when he was in high school. In 2005, he founded Liquid Ass Novelties, LLC, in North Carolina, alongside fellow engineer Andrew Masters.

Liquid Ass is sold in retail locations in the United States and at least 8 other countries, as well as online. According to the manufacturer, the product will not stain most fabrics and the odor dissipates in less than a day.

The U.S. Military uses Liquid Ass in training to prepare troops for the odor of the battlefield. It is also used in medical training, as the product's smell is similar to that of the human colon.
