= Shocking gum =

Practical joke device

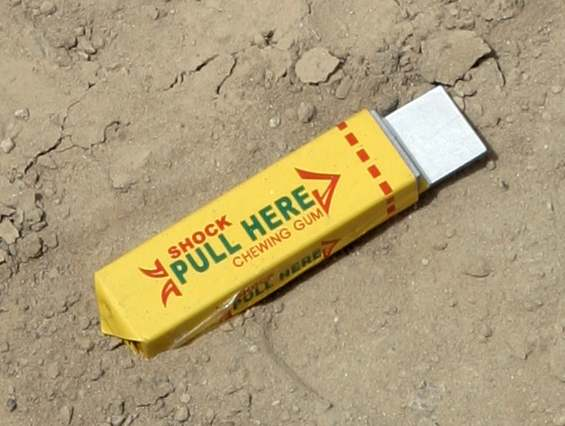
A packet of shock chewing gum reportedly taken from an insurgent during the Iraq War

Shocking gum is a practical joke device that delivers a mild electric shock. The victim is offered what appears to be the last stick of chewing gum from a package; touching or pulling the stick of gum triggers the shock. A few novelty companies have produced "shocking gum" packages since the 1950s, depicting fictitious brands such as Fruit Juicy and JB.

In 2005, the U.S. Marine Corps reported that insurgents in Iraq were using shock chewing gum as a form of torture, forcing prisoners to bite down on the sticks.

Another closely related prank device is the chewing gum bug, in which a fake plastic bug attached to a metal spring instead "snaps" the hand of the person who attempts to take the piece of gum.

== See also ==
- List of practical joke topics
