= Snake nut can =

Practical joke device

A snake nut can is a practical joke device that closely resembles a can of nuts, but contains a long wire spring covered by a cloth or vinyl sheath, printed like snake skin, which leaps out of the can and startles the unsuspecting victim.

The item was invented by Samuel Sorensen Adams of the S.S. Adams Co. circa 1915. Adamses' wife Emily had been complaining about the jam jar, saying that it wasn't properly closed or that it was sticky. Adams, inspired by her nagging, then invented a spring snake — a coil of wire wrapped in a cloth skin — and compressed the two-foot snake into a little jam jar so that it would jump out when the lid was removed.

The snake jam jar then evolved into a whole array of products, including the snake peanut brittle can, the snake mint can, and the best-selling snake nut can. In the 1990s Adams' grandson produced snake potato chips.

The snake nut can is commonly associated with April Fool's Day, and is often portrayed in that context in film and TV.

== See also ==
- List of practical joke topics
