= Soren Sorensen Adams =

Danish-American inventor of novelty products

Soren Sorenson Adams
- Born: Søren Adam Sørensen; May 24, 1879; Kolind, Randers County, Denmark
- Died: October 20, 1963 (aged 84); Asbury Park, New Jersey, U.S.
- Spouse: Emily Josephine Harrigan (m.1915)
- Children: 3

Soren Sorensen "Sam" Adams (May 24, 1879 – October 20, 1963) was a Danish-American inventor and manufacturer of novelty products, including the joy buzzer.

== Biography ==
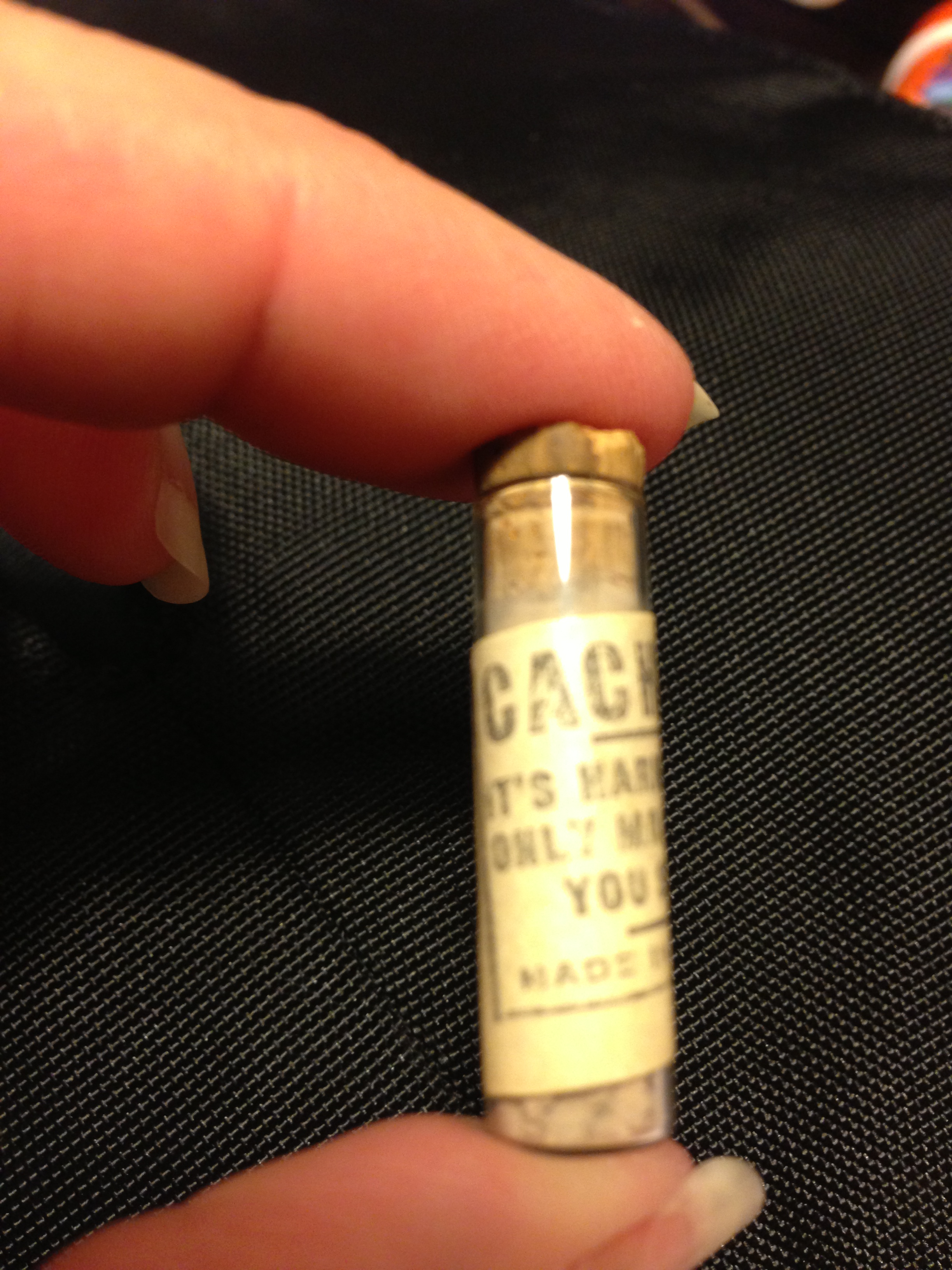
Cachoo Sneezing Powder

He was born Søren Adam Sørensen in Kolind, Syddjurs, Denmark, in 1879 to Hans Sørensen, a clog maker, and his wife. They moved to the US when Soren was two, and settled in the Scandinavian community of Perth Amboy, New Jersey where his father operated a saloon. In 1904 Adams found himself employed as a salesman for a dye company. One of the products he sold caused workers to sneeze, and Sam found a way to extract this derivative from the dye and called this new powder Cachoo. He was inundated by requests for this product from his friends and so, he decided to sell his interest in a hotel in York, Pennsylvania, and used the money to launch the Cachoo Sneezing Powder Company in Plainfield, New Jersey.

Within a few years, the sneezing powder craze that swept the country had subsided, and Sam set out to innovating new products. He also changed the name of the company to S.S. Adams Co. to reflect that it was no longer a one product company. The Exploding Cigarette Box, the snake nut can, itching powder, the stink bomb, and the dribble glass all entered the Adams line in the next decade.

In 1928, Sam invented the prototype of what was to become the joy buzzer, a mechanical device placed in the hand, which emitted a loud vibrating buzz, when a button on the buzzer was depressed. This would usually occur when two people shook hands. He took the prototype to Dresden, Germany, where a tool and die maker created the tooling to make small parts for the item, which was now just 3.2 cm (1-1/4 inches) in diameter and 1.8 cm (3/4 inch) thick. The final item was patented in 1932. The success of the item allowed him to greatly increase his staff and purchase the former Symphonion music box factory building (constructed in 1893, demolished 2017) in Neptune, New Jersey, all during the Great Depression.

In 1930, the JEM Rubber Co. of Toronto, Canada, approached Sam with their new invention; a small, green, blow-up ball called Whoopee, which was to become the famous whoopee cushion. Sam said that "the whole idea seemed too indelicate" and would never sell. JEM Rubber then went and offered the idea to other distributors including Johnson Smith & Company, which ended up selling it with great success. S.S. Adams Co. later released its own version calling it the "Razzberry Cushion."

Adams utilized the illustration skills of the Philadelphia-born artist Louis Glackens to promote his products. Glackens created the cartoon artwork for the packaging of many Adams toys and novelties.

== Later life and death ==
Sam and S.S. Adams went on to create many more successful novelties: The Bar Bug in Ice Cube, The Money Maker, The Squirting Nickel, The Jumping Coin, Laughing Tissue as well as an extensive line of novelty-based magic tricks and puzzles. He claimed to have devised over 600 different items, and patented about 40 of them. He continued to lead S.S. Adams Company until his death in Asbury Park, New Jersey in 1963 at age 84.

== Sources ==
- Demaris, Kirk (2006). Life of The Party: A Visual History of the S.S. Adams Company. Neptune, NJ: S.S. Adams Co.
- Newgarden, Mark (2004). Cheap Laffs: The Art of the Novelty Item. New York: Abrams.
- Rauscher, William (2002). S.S. Adams: High Priest of Pranks and Merchant of Magic. Oxford, CT: David E. Haversat.
- Zolotow, Maurice (1952). It Takes All Kinds. New York: Random House.
