= Whoopee cushion =

Practical joke device made by JEM Rubber Co

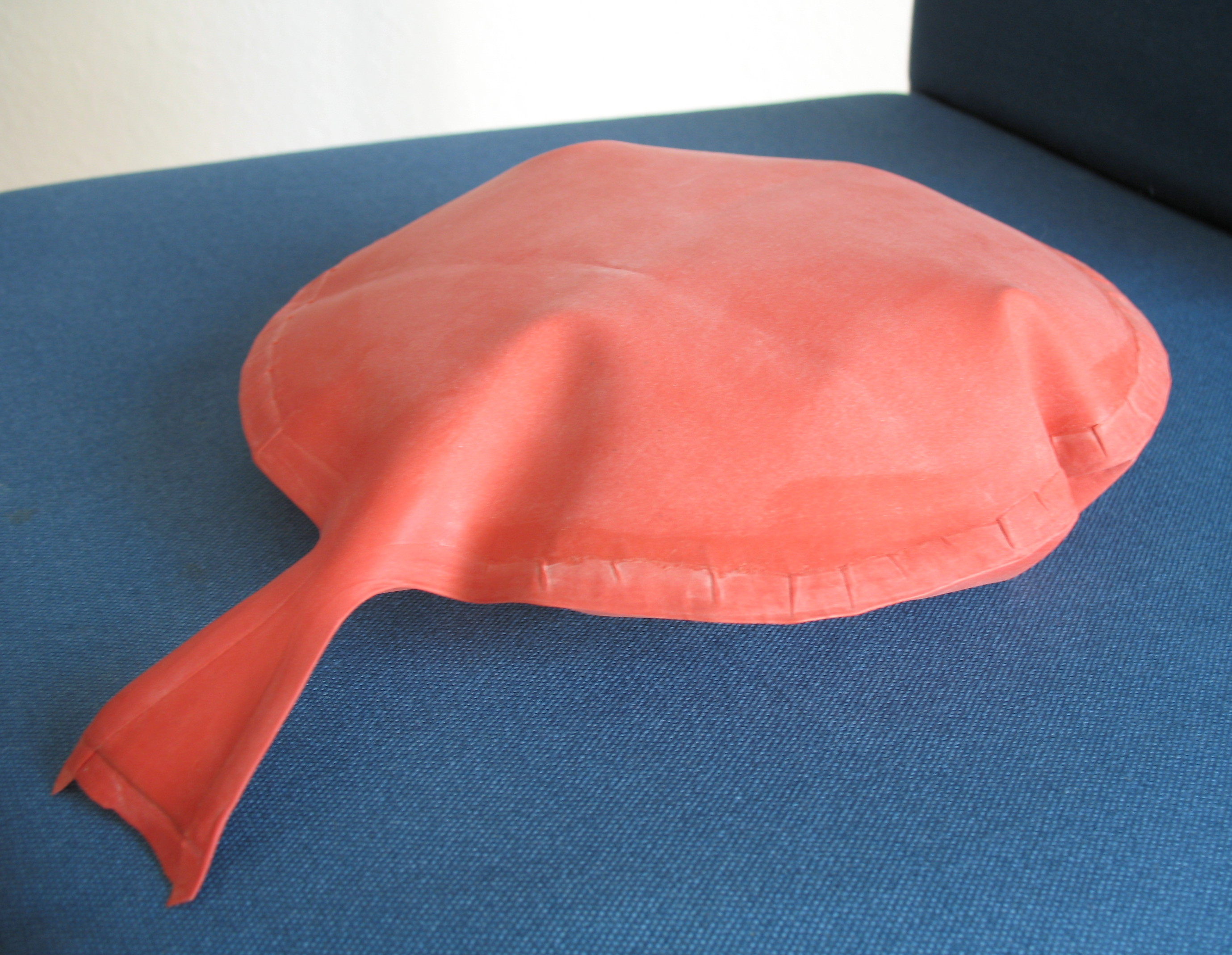
A whoopee cushion awaiting a victim.

A whoopee cushion (also spelled whoopie cushion) is a practical joke device, which simulates the sound of flatulence when sat on.

== History and modern usage ==
Records of a whoopee cushion date back to the 10th-century Aghlabid emir of Ifriqiya, Ziyadat Allah III. He is said to have enjoyed hiding inflated animal bladders under the cushions of his palace for unsuspecting guests to sit on.

The modern rubber whoopee cushion was invented in the 1930s by the JEM Rubber Co. of Toronto, Ontario, Canada, by employees who were experimenting with scrap sheets of rubber. The company's owner approached Samuel Sorenson Adams, inventor of numerous practical jokes and owner of S.S. Adams Co., with the newly invented item. Adams considered it "indelicate" and declined an offer to distribute it. JEM then offered the idea to the Sawyer P. Lawrence Company, which sold it with great success. Adams later released its own version, calling it the Razzberry Cushion.

== Design ==
Video showing the working principle of whoopee cushions in slow motion

The device is made from two sheets of rubber, adhered at their perimeter, with a small flap opening at one end for air to enter and exit. Whoopee cushions lack durability and can break easily, lasting longest when they are not inflated or sat on with excessive force.

== Use ==
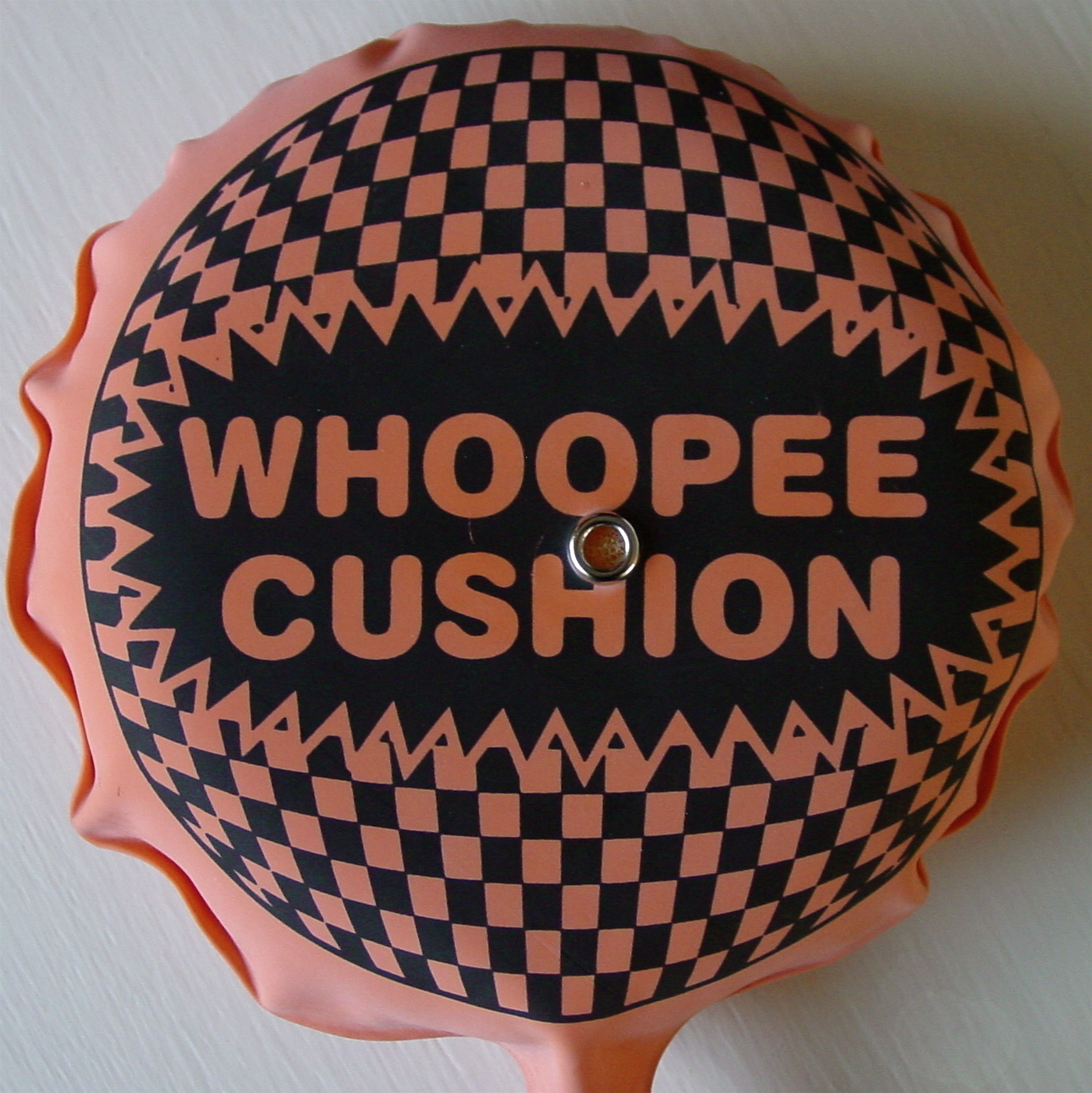
Self-inflating cushion with sponge interior

Whoopee cushions are inflated by blowing into the flapped opening. "Self-inflating" cushions have an interior sponge that keeps them in a normally expanded state, and do not require inflation.

The cushion is then placed under a seat cushion or other material, for someone unsuspecting to sit on — forcing the air out, causing the flap to vibrate and creating a flatulent sound.

If the act of sitting happens to block the air flow, the cushion can rupture -- thus requiring some attention in placement of the cushion. Alternatively, the cushion can be inflated and intentionally operated by hand to produce the noise.

== See also ==
- List of inflatable manufactured goods
- List of practical joke topics
