= Exploding cigar =

Cigar that explodes after being lit, usually as a practical joke

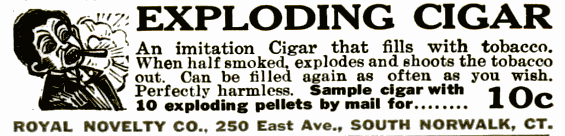
Exploding cigar pellets advertisement from January 1917 edition of Popular Mechanics

An exploding cigar is a variety of cigar that explodes shortly after being lit. Such cigars are normally packed with a minute chemical explosive charge near the lighting end or with a non-chemical device that ruptures the cigar when exposed to heat. Also known as "loaded cigars," the customary intended purpose of exploding cigars is as a practical joke, rather than to cause lasting physical harm to the smoker of the cigar. Nevertheless, the high risk of unintended injuries from their use caused a decline in their manufacture and sale.

Although far rarer than their prank cousins, the use of exploding cigars as a means to kill or attempt to kill targets in real life has been claimed, and is well represented as a fictional plot device. The most famous case concerning the intentionally deadly variety was an alleged plot by the CIA in the 1960s to assassinate Cuban leader Fidel Castro. Notable real-life incidents involving the non-lethal variety include an exploding cigar purportedly given by Ulysses S. Grant to an acquaintance and a dust-up between Turkish military officers and Ernest Hemingway after he pranked one of them with an exploding cigar.

== Manufacture and decline ==
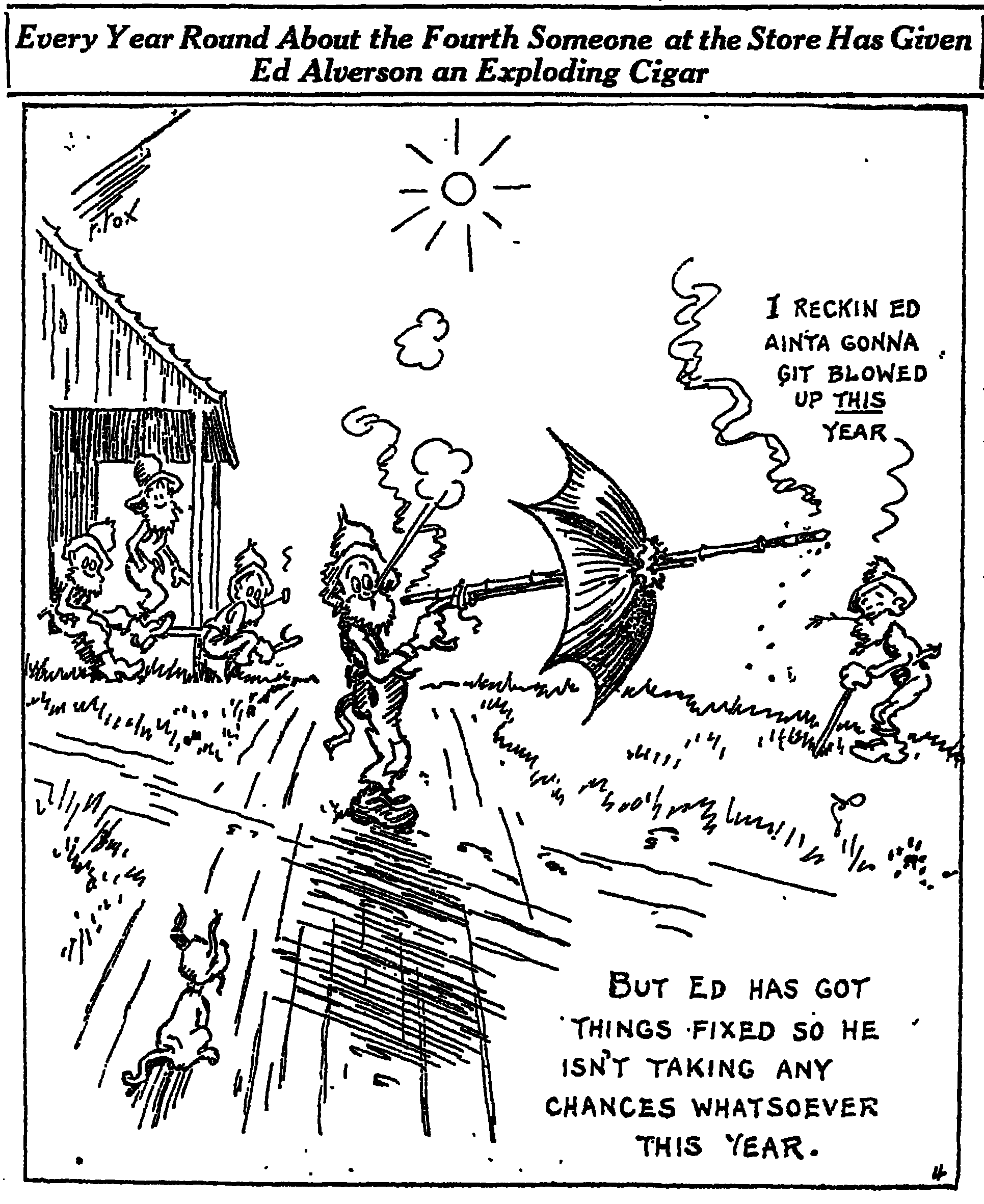
Exploding cigar comic from July 8, 1919 edition of the Oakland Tribune by Fontaine Fox.

The largest manufacturer and purveyor of exploding cigars in the United States during the middle of the 20th century was the S. S. Adams Company, which, according to The Saturday Evening Post, made more exploding cigars and other gag novelty items as of 1946 than its next eleven competitors combined.

The company was founded by Soren Sorensen Adams, dubbed the "king of the professional pranksters", who invented and patented many common gag novelties such as sneezing powder, itching powder, the dribble glass and the joy buzzer. The largest New York–based manufacturer of exploding cigars was Richard Appel, a German refugee from Nuremberg, who in or about 1940 opened a gag novelty factory on Manhattan's Lower East Side.

By the time exploding cigars were being turned out by manufacturers such as Adams and Appel, the chemical explosive variety had fallen out of favor. According to Adams, the large-scale switch to a non-chemical device occurred in approximately 1915 in the aftermath of a death caused by a homemade exploding cigar rigged with dynamite. Though exploding cigars were not normally rigged with dynamite but with explosive caps using a less powerful incendiary, following the incident, a number of US states banned the product altogether. The replacement for chemical explosives was a metal spring mechanism, bound with cord—as the victim puffed away, the cord burned through, causing the device to spring open, thus rupturing the cigar's end.

However, the decline in the use and advertisement of the exploding cigar was neither complete, nor permanent, and they can be obtained worldwide. In the United States, makers include Don Osvaldo and Hawkins Joke Shop. However, their availability in the US is limited, as some states, such as Massachusetts, have banned their sale entirely.

Prank exploding cigars have caused many injuries over their history. For example, in 1902 one Edward Weinschreider sued a cigar shop for an exploding cigar that burned his hand so badly three of his fingers had to be amputated. As has been observed by one legal scholar, "[t]he utility of the exploding cigar is so low and the risk of injury so high as to warrant a conclusion that the cigar is defective and should not have been marketed at all." Laws have been enacted banning the sale of exploding cigars entirely, such as Chapter 178 of Massachusetts' Acts and Resolves, passed by its legislature in 1967.

== In fiction ==
Both prank and intentionally deadly exploding cigars have been featured in numerous works of fiction, spanning many forms of media including literature, film, comics books, cartoons and others. A well-known use of the exploding cigar in literature, for example, appears in Thomas Pynchon's 1973 novel, Gravity's Rainbow. In it, the character Etzel Ölsch symbolically betrays his death wish by eagerly smoking a cigar he knows to be of the prank explosive variety. Other book examples include Robert Coover's 1977 novel, The Public Burning, where a fictionalized Richard Nixon hands an exploding cigar to Uncle Sam, and Sherburne James' Death's Clenched Fist (1982), in which a Tammany Hall politico of the 1890s is murdered with an exploding cigar.

Film examples include Cecil B. DeMille's 1921 romance Fool's Paradise, wherein the main character is blinded by an exploding cigar; Laurel and Hardy's Great Guns (1941), which features a gag in which tobacco is replaced by gunpowder; in Road To Morocco (1942) with Bing Crosby and Bob Hope features the duo mixing gunpowder with tobacco in order to create chaos and escape a desert sheik with their girls; the Elke Sommer vehicle, Deadlier Than the Male (1967), where a murder by exploding cigar is a key plot element; in The Beatles' 1968 animated feature film, Yellow Submarine, where an exploding cigar is used to rebuff a psychedelic boxing monster; the 1984 comedy Top Secret!, in which Omar Sharif's British secret agent character is pranked with an exploding cigar by a blindman; and in the 2005 film V for Vendetta, where the main antagonist's cigar is swapped with an exploding one during a comedy skit.

The appearance of exploding cigars in the Warner Bros. cartoon franchises, Merrie Melodies and Looney Tunes was fairly common, often coupled with the explosion resulting in the pranked character appearing in blackface. Some examples include: Bacall to Arms (1942), wherein an animated Humphrey Bogart gets zapped by an exploding cigar leaving him in blackface, 1949's Mississippi Hare, where the character Colonel Shuffle likewise ends up in blackface after the explosion, 1952's Rabbit's Kin, in which Pete Puma offers Bugs Bunny an exploding cigar (true to form, Bugs Bunny turns the tables on the hapless feline, placing the cigar in Pete's mouth after he is dazed and lighting it with expected results), and 1964's Dr. Devil and Mr. Hare, where the Tasmanian Devil successfully gets Bugs Bunny to smoke an exploding cigar.

Other media examples include television appearances such as when Peter Falk's Columbo must solve an industrial magnate's death by exploding cigar in the episode "Short Fuse" (1972), in a season four episode of the United States television, CBS crime drama, CSI: NY titled "Child's Play", wherein the forensic team investigate the death of a man killed by an exploding cigar, and in a 1966 episode of The Avengers entitled "A Touch of Brimstone"; in video games such as Day of the Tentacle where Hoagie can offer George Washington an exploding cigar; and as a stock device by the Joker in Batman comic books. For example, in Batman #251 (1973) entitled "The Joker's Five-Way Revenge", an exploding cigar containing nitroglycerin is used by the Joker to kill one of the members of his gang. The Adventures of Tintin comics have occasionally utilized prank exploding cigars against Captain Haddock.

== In reality ==
=== Ulysses S. Grant's delayed gift ===
According to a 1932 Associated Press story, U.S. President Ulysses S. Grant gave Horace Norton, the founder of a now defunct college in Chicago, an exploding cigar soon after being introduced to him, but the "joke" wasn't revealed until many years later.

According to the story, unaware of the nature of the gift, Norton saved the cigar, keeping it on display in his college's museum. Years later, when the school was shutting its doors for good, the alumni thought it would be a fitting gesture to smoke the cigar at the college's annual reunion. The honor was given to Winstead Norton, Horace's grandson. During the sober speech he was presenting, Winstead lit the cigar, and after two puffs, it exploded. A 1952 news report contradicts one detail, holding that the explosion ultimately occurred at a family reunion rather than the alumni affair noted.

The tale of "Grant's cigar" has unquestionably been embellished over time. The possibility exists that the tale is a hoax or urban legend or that the cigar was tampered with by someone after Grant's purported presentation.

=== Ernest Hemingway ===
Reportedly, Ernest Hemingway, urged on by a group of journalists with whom he was drinking at the Palace Hotel bar in Rapallo, Italy, presented an exploding cigar to one of four bodyguards of Turkish general İsmet İnönü. When the cigar "went off", all four guards drew their guns and aimed at Hemingway. He apparently escaped without any grievous bodily injury.

=== CIA plot to assassinate Castro ===
Cover of October 1963 issue (#82) of Mad Magazine. Written by Al Jaffee and painted by Norman Mingo

In the late 1950s under Dwight D. Eisenhower's presidential administration and in the early 1960s under John F. Kennedy's, the CIA had been brainstorming and implementing plots to assassinate Fidel Castro, going as far as enlisting the help of American Mafia leaders such as Johnny Roselli and Santo Trafficante, Jr. to assist in carrying out their plans. Many assassination ideas were floated by the CIA in the covert operation which was dubbed "Operation Mongoose." The most infamous was the CIA's alleged plot to capitalize on Castro's well known love of cigars by slipping into his supply a very real and lethal "exploding cigar." A November 4, 1967 Saturday Evening Post article reported that during Castro's visit to the United Nations in 1966 a CIA agent approached NYPD chief inspector Michael J. Murphy with a plan to get Castro to smoke an exploding cigar.

While numerous sources state the exploding cigar plot as fact, at least one source asserts it to be simply a myth, while another suggests it was merely supermarket tabloid fodder. One source theorizes that the story does have its origins in the CIA, but that it was never seriously proposed by them; rather, the plot was made up by the CIA as an intentionally "silly" idea to feed to those questioning them about their plans for Castro, in order to deflect scrutiny from more serious areas of inquiry.

Whether true or not, the CIA's exploding cigar assassination plot inspired the cover of the October 1963 issue (#82) of Mad Magazine. Conceived by Al Jaffee, the cover (pictured at right) bears the headline, "You'll Get a BANG out of this issue of Mad Magazine", and features a painting by Norman Mingo depicting Castro in the act of lighting a cigar wrapped with a cigar band on which is drawn Alfred E. Neuman with his fingers plugging his ears, awaiting the explosion. An exploding cigar is also featured on the poster for the Channel 4 British Documentary, 638 Ways to Kill Castro, which shows Castro with a cigar in his mouth that has a fuse projecting from the end and a lit match approaching. An exploding cigar was tested on a season 2 episode of Deadliest Warrior, KGB vs. CIA; the cigar completely destroyed the upper and lower jaw of a gel head, but was determined to be very unreliable due to its timed fuse and small explosive payload.

== See also ==
- List of practical joke topics

== Footnotes ==
1. Describing the comic in Popular Science Monthly in an April 1928 article, Fox stated, "There are always fools in the world who think it is funny to hand out exploding cigars, so I drew a picture of a yokel enjoying such a gift cigar in complete safety. This device included a bamboo tube extending through an umbrella parallel to the handle so that a cigar inserted in the ferrule end might be safely smoked from behind the shelter of the umbrella."
2. Certainly there were numerous incredible plots to do in Castro that are ascribed to the CIA, including among others: poisoning his cigars (a box of the lethal smokes were actually prepared and delivered to Havana); exploding seashells to be planted at a scuba diving site; a gift diving wetsuit impregnated with noxious bacteria and mold spores, or with lethal chemical agents; infecting Castro's scuba regulator apparatus with tuberculous bacilli; dousing his handkerchiefs, his tea, and his coffee with other lethal bacteria; having a former lover to slip him poison pills; and exposing him to various other poisoned items such as a fountain pen and even ice cream. The U.S. Senate's Church Committee of 1975 stated that it had confirmed at least eight separate CIA run plots to assassinate Castro. Fabian Escalante, who was long tasked with protecting the life of Castro, contends that there have been 638 separate CIA assassination schemes or attempts on Castro's life.
3. Barbara and David Mikkelson, founders of Snopes.com, known for its investigations into possible urban legends, write that "Aside from [one] minor inconsistency ... we haven't been able to uncover much of anything else about this legend. All versions of it apparently stem from the same Associated Press account, and we haven't found any other evidence of a connection or meeting between Ulysses S. Grant and Horace Norton. Without knowing even the name of the correspondent who provided the report to the Associated Press, we don't have much else to go by in trying to trace it back to a source. It could be a true story, it could be a bit of amusing fiction fabricated by (or fed to) a reporter, or it could be a literally true but staged event..."
