= CIA assassination attempts on Fidel Castro =

Assassination attempts on Cuban Leader Fidel Castro

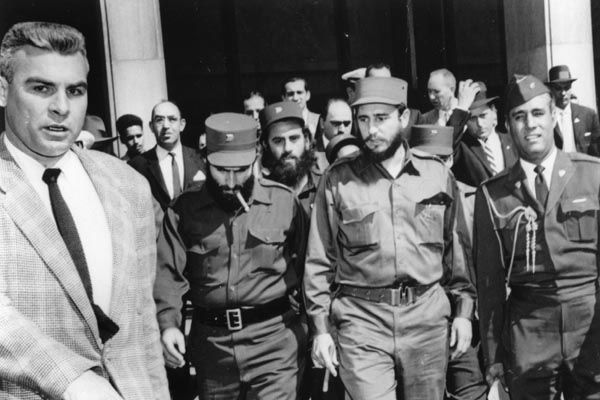
Fidel Castro visiting Washington, D.C., in April 1959, shortly after the Cuban Revolution

The United States' Central Intelligence Agency (CIA) made numerous unsuccessful attempts to assassinate Cuban leader Fidel Castro. There were also attempts on Castro's life by Cuban exiles, sometimes in cooperation with the CIA. The 1975 Church Committee claimed eight proven CIA assassination attempts between 1960 and 1965. In 1976, President Gerald Ford issued Executive Order 11905 banning political assassinations. In 2006, Fabián Escalante, former chief of Cuba's intelligence, stated that there had been 634 assassination schemes or attempts. The last known plot to assassinate Castro was by Cuban exiles in 2000.

== Background ==
Fidel Castro attended Roman Catholic boarding school; he began his political career while attending the School of Law of the University of Havana. After World War II, the United States secretly became involved in international political assassination attempts on foreign leaders. This program was contrary to the United Nations Charter, and U.S. officials denied its existence. On March 5, 1972, Director of Central Intelligence Richard Helms declared that "no such activity or operations be undertaken, assisted, or suggested by any of our personnel."

In 1975, the U.S. Senate convened the Senate Select Committee to Study Governmental Operations with Respect to Intelligence Activities, chaired by Senator Frank Church (D-Idaho). The Church Committee found that the CIA and other agencies provided plausible deniability for high-ranking officials regarding these assassination attempts, as lower-ranking officials withheld information and obtained tacit approval for officially disapproved operations by using euphemisms in communications.

Castro died of natural causes in 2016 at the age of 90.

== Early attempts ==
According to CIA Director Richard Helms, officials in the Kennedy administration exerted heavy pressure on the CIA to "get rid of Castro." There were many assassination plots, aimed at creating a favorable impression of President John F. Kennedy. There were five phases of assassination attempts, with planning involving the CIA, the Department of Defense, and the State Department: before August 1960, August 1960 to April 1961, April 1961 to late 1961, late 1961 to late 1962, and late 1962 to late 1963. Fidel Castro survived numerous attempts to either assassinate him or end his political career. One attempt involved spraying a chemical similar to LSD into the air of the room at a radio station from which Castro would broadcast, with the goal of making him speak erratically while on the air. Castro loved diving, and the CIA attempted to create a diving suit infected with tuberculosis that would kill Castro slowly over time. Castro found out about this and the plan did not succeed.

According to columnist Jack Anderson, the first CIA attempt to assassinate Castro was part of the Bay of Pigs Invasion operation. Five subsequent CIA teams were sent. At the end of February or beginning of March 1963, the last team was apprehended on a rooftop within rifle range of Castro. Attorney Robert Maheu, who was working as a CIA cutout at the time, was identified as the team leader who recruited John Roselli, a gambler with contacts in the American Mafia and Cuban underworlds. The CIA assigned two operations officers, William King Harvey and James O'Connell, to accompany Roselli to Miami to recruit the actual teams.

== Mafia engagement ==
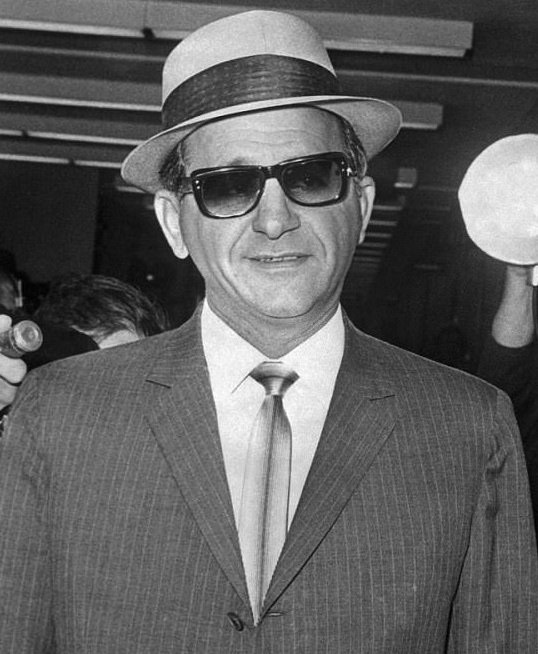
Sam Giancana, head of the Chicago crime syndicate

According to CIA documents, the so-called Family Jewels that were declassified in 2007, one assassination attempt on Fidel Castro prior to the Bay of Pigs invasion involved noted American mobsters John Roselli, Sam Giancana and Santo Trafficante. At least some of the CIA assassination attempts on Castro were given the CIA project name ZRRIFLE.

In September 1960, Momo Salvatore Giancana, a successor of Al Capone's in the Chicago Outfit, and Miami Syndicate leader Santo Trafficante, who were both on the FBI's Ten Most Wanted list at that time, were indirectly contacted by the CIA about the possibility of Fidel Castro's assassination. Johnny Roselli, a member of the Las Vegas Syndicate, was used to get access to Mafia bosses. The go-between from the CIA was Robert Maheu of the Howard Hughes organization, who introduced himself as a representative of several international businesses in Cuba that were expropriated by Castro. On September 14, 1960, Maheu met with Roselli in a New York City hotel and offered him $150,000 for the "removal" of Castro. James O'Connell, who identified himself as Maheu's associate but who actually was the chief of the CIA's operational support division, was present during the meeting. The declassified documents did not reveal whether Roselli, Giancana or Trafficante accepted a down payment for the job. According to the CIA files, Giancana suggested poison pills as a means to doctor Castro's food or drinks. Such pills, manufactured by the CIA's Technical Services Division, were given to Giancana's nominee named Juan Orta, who had been recommended as an official in the Cuban government with access to Castro.

Allegedly, after several unsuccessful attempts to introduce the poison into Castro's food, Orta abruptly demanded to be let out of the mission, handing over the job to another unnamed participant. Later, a second attempt was mounted through Giancana, Roselli, and Trafficante using Anthony Varona, the leader of the Cuban Exile Junta, who had, according to Trafficante, become "disaffected with the apparent ineffectual progress of the Junta". Varona requested US$10,000 in expenses and US$1,000 worth of communications equipment. However, the second assassination attempt was apparently thwarted when Castro stopped visiting the restaurant that had the botulinum toxin poison pills, and was cancelled entirely due to the launching of the Bay of Pigs Invasion.

According to secret transcripts declassified in 2021, then Inspector General Scott Breckinridge, in his 1975 Church Committee hearing, told senators that the CIA had also contemplated using botulinum toxin to lace cigars to be delivered to Castro, but this plan never went forward.

On October 26, 2017, during the first presidency of Donald Trump, declassified documents revealed that US Attorney General Robert F. Kennedy hesitated to recruit the Mafia in assassination attempts on Castro due to his push against organized crime.

== Later attempts ==
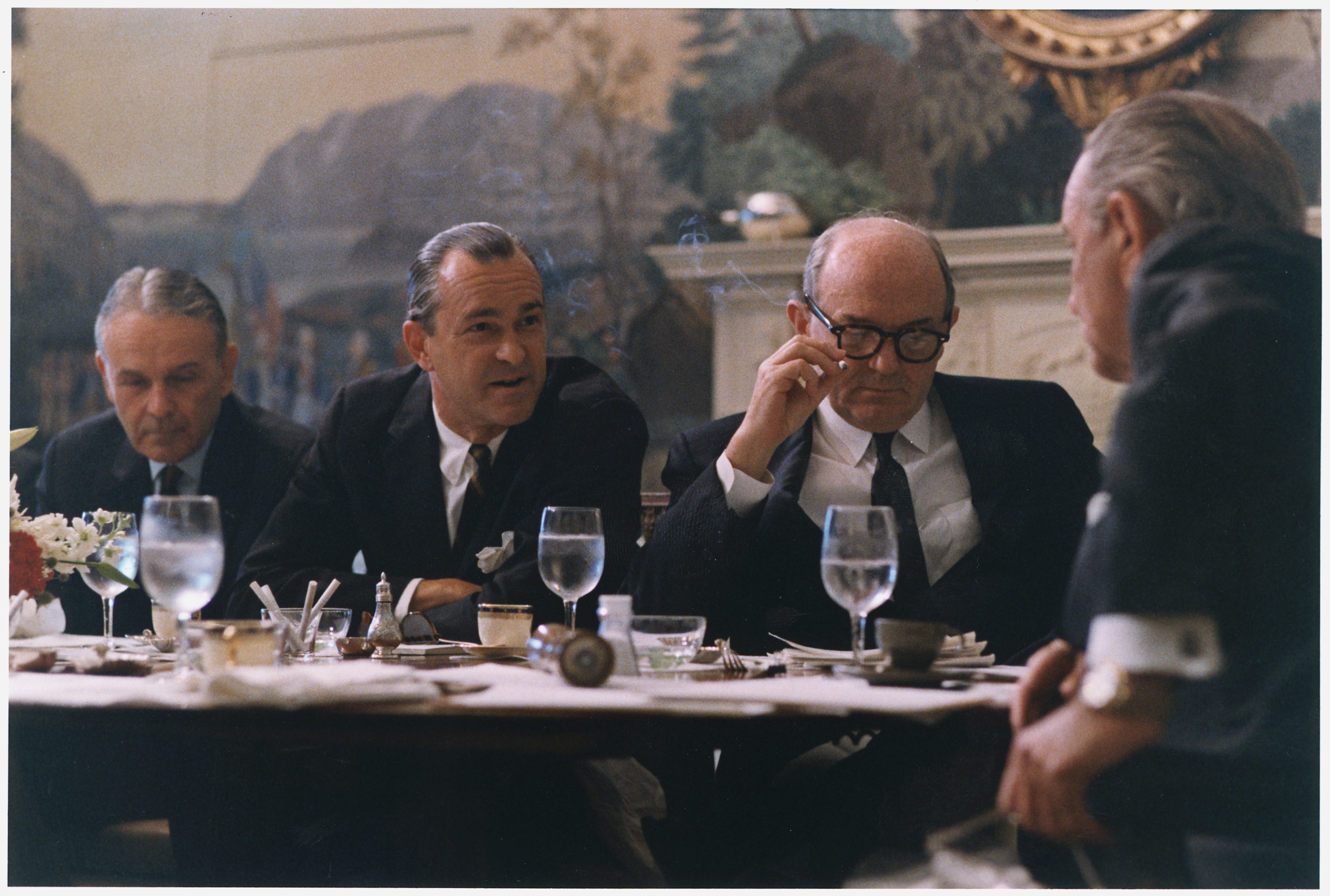
CIA Director Richard Helms with President Lyndon B. Johnson in July 1968

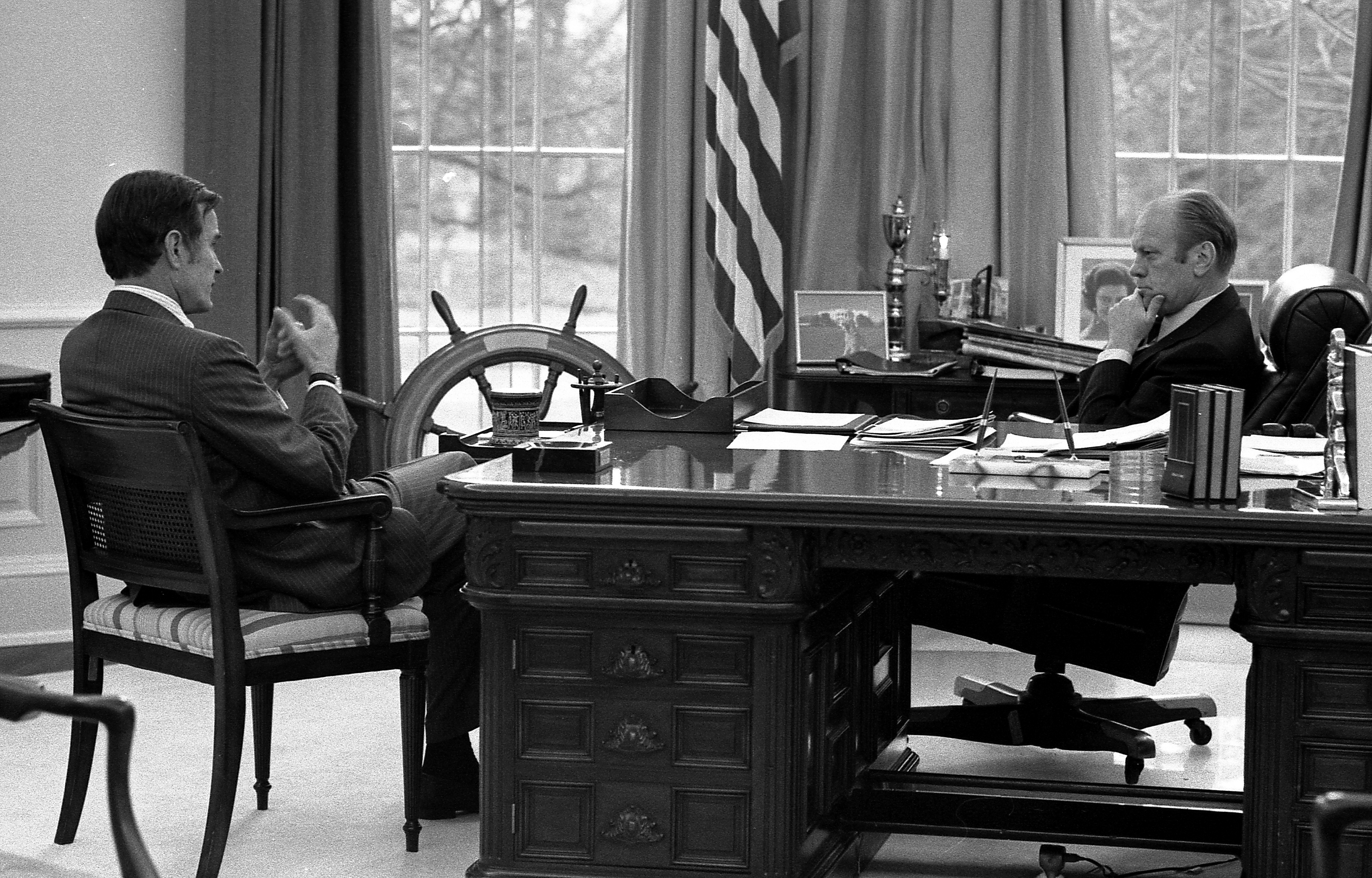
CIA Director George H. W. Bush meeting with President Gerald Ford in the Oval Office in December 1975

The Church Committee stated that it substantiated eight attempts by the CIA to assassinate Fidel Castro in 1960–1965. Fabián Escalante, a retired chief of Cuba's counterintelligence who had been tasked with protecting Castro, estimated the number of assassination schemes or actual attempts by the CIA at 638, a project code-named Executive Action, and split them among U.S. administrations as follows: Dwight D. Eisenhower, 38; John F. Kennedy, 42; Lyndon B. Johnson, 72; Richard Nixon, 184; Jimmy Carter, 64; Ronald Reagan, 197; George H. W. Bush, 16; Bill Clinton, 21.

Some of the schemes were a part of the covert CIA program dubbed Operation Mongoose aimed at toppling the Cuban government. The assassination attempts reportedly included cigars poisoned with botulinum toxin, a Eumycota fungi-infected scuba-diving suit along with a booby-trapped conch placed on the sea bottom, an exploding cigar (Castro loved cigars and scuba diving, but quit smoking in 1985), and plain, mafia-style execution endeavors, among others. There were also plans to blow up Castro during his visit to Ernest Hemingway's museum in Cuba.

In 2006, some of the plots against Castro were depicted in a documentary film, 638 Ways to Kill Castro, which aired on British public-service television station Channel 4. One of these attempts was by his ex-lover Marita Lorenz, whom he met in 1959. She agreed to aid the CIA and attempted to smuggle a jar of cold cream containing poison pills into his room. When Castro learned about her intentions, he reportedly gave her a gun and told her to kill him, but her nerves failed. Some plots aimed not at murder but at character assassination; they, for example, involved using thallium salts to destroy Castro's famous beard, or lacing his radio studio with "A substance resembling LSD" to cause him disorientation during the broadcast and damage his public image.

When Castro travelled abroad, the CIA cooperated with Cuban exiles for some of the more serious assassination attempts.

The CIA in 1962 considered a plan called "Operation Bounty", which would have involved dropping leaflets over Cuba offering financial rewards to the Cuban population for the assassination of various individuals, including $5,000 to $20,000 for informants, $57,000 for department heads, $97,000 for foreign Communists operating in Cuba, up to $1 million for members of the Cuban government, and only $0.02 for Castro himself, which was meant to "denigrate" him in the eyes of the Cuban people. The top secret document that revealed the plan, which was never put into practice, was one of 2,800 related to the federal investigation of the Kennedy assassination, which were released as scheduled in October 2017.

The last documented attempt on Castro's life was in 2000, undertaken by Cuban exiles, and involved placing 90 kg of explosives under a podium in Panama where he would give a talk. Castro’s personal security team discovered the explosives before he arrived. Castro once said that, with respect to the numerous attempts on his life he believed had been made, "if surviving assassination attempts were an Olympic event, I would win the gold medal."

== Reactions ==
The Church Committee rejected political assassination as a foreign policy tool and declared that it was "incompatible with American principle, international order, and morality." It recommended that Congress consider developing a statute to eradicate it or similar practices, a concept that was never introduced. In 1976, President Gerald Ford signed Executive Order 11905, which stated that "No employee of the United States government shall engage in, or conspire in, political assassination."

For many years, The New York Times kept an obituary ready for Fidel Castro in its composing room, already locked on a "turtle" (flat table) for instant printing in the event of his assassination. Castro eventually survived so many assassination attempts that the hot metal typesetting process became outdated and the turtle was moved to the office of William Safire, where it remained as of 1990.

== See also ==
- 638 Ways to Kill Castro
- Church Committee
- Cuban Project
- Foreign interventions by the United States
- United States involvement in regime change
