= 638 Ways to Kill Castro =

2006 television film

- A screenshot of Fidel Castro from the documentary trailer
- Directed by: Dollan Cannell
- Theme music composer: Samuel Sim
- Country of origin: United Kingdom
- Original language: English

Production
- Producer: Kari Lia
- Cinematography: Petra Graf; Michael Timney
- Editor: Oliver Huddleston
- Running time: 75 minutes

Original release
- Network: Channel 4
- Release: 28 November 2006

638 Ways to Kill Castro is a Channel 4 documentary film, broadcast in the United Kingdom on 28 November 2006, which tells the story of some of the numerous attempts of the Central Intelligence Agency to kill Cuba's leader Fidel Castro. It was directed by Dollan Cannell.

== Production ==
The film reveals multiple methods of assassination, exploding cigars to femmes fatales; a radio station rigged with gaseous LSD to a poison syringe posing as an innocuous fountain pen. Fabian Escalante, the former head of the Intelligence Directorate and the man who had the job of protecting Castro for many of the 49 years he was in power, said that there were over 600 plots and conspiracies known to Cuban agents, all dreamt up to end Castro's life. Some were perpetrated by the Central Intelligence Agency, especially during the first half of the 1960s. From the seventies onwards, the attempts were most often made by Cuban exiles who had been trained by the CIA shortly after Castro took power in 1959.

The film also contains extensive material shot with Antonio Veciana, the Cuban exile who came close to killing Castro on three occasions over 17 years. He is found running a marine supplies store in Miami. All these men, the film claims, were supported and funded by the United States government. At one point the CIA even sought the help of the Mafia in the hope they would be able to succeed where so many others had failed. Other characters are Cuban exile Félix Rodríguez, the CIA operative who trained Cuban exiles for the Bay of Pigs Invasion, and who was present when the Bolivian Army killed Che Guevara in 1967 at the request of the Bolivian President at the time, and Enrique Ovares, possibly the first man to make an attempt on Castro's life after he took power. Robert Maheu is also interviewed, the Hughes associate who served as liaison between the CIA and mobsters "Johnny" Roselli and Sam "Momo" Giancana, in another plot to kill Castro, this time using poison pills.

The sub-text of the film is a comment on the contemporary "war on terror". The film's executive producer was Peter Moore. It was directed by Dollan Cannell and the commissioning editor was Meredith Chambers.

== Controversy ==
In 2006, the documentary was the centre of a controversy surrounding US Congresswoman Ileana Ros-Lehtinen. In it the Miami Republican, who had been recently tapped to become the top Republican on the House International Relations Committee, stated "I welcome the opportunity of having anyone assassinate Fidel Castro and any leader who is oppressing the people." A clip of her statement made its way to YouTube where the news media quickly picked up the story. There was a subsequent public questioning of Ros-Lehtinen's morals and suitability for her job. She responded by asserting that the clip was spliced together and that it was taken out of context; but after her account was contested by the film's director, she eventually released a statement, on Christmas Eve, accepting that she had made the remark. She soon apologised and was later elected.

== See also ==
- Assassination attempts on Fidel Castro
- Fidel Castro
