= Robert Maheu =

American investigator (1917–2008)

- Maheu in 1970
- Born: Robert Aime Maheu; October 30, 1917; Waterville, Maine, U.S.
- Died: August 4, 2008 (aged 90); Las Vegas, Nevada, U.S.
- Education: College of the Holy Cross (BA); Georgetown University (LLB)

Robert Aime Maheu (October 30, 1917 – August 4, 2008) was an American businessman and lawyer, who worked for the FBI and CIA, and as the chief executive of Nevada operations for the industrialist Howard Hughes.

== Early life ==
Maheu was born in Waterville, Maine, the son of Christine and Ephrem Maheu, who were of French-Canadian descent. He held degrees from the College of the Holy Cross and Georgetown University. In 1941, during his law studies at Georgetown, he was hired by the FBI and worked as a counter-intelligence officer in Europe during World War II. He left the FBI in 1947 and opened Robert A. Maheu and Associates, a private detective firm in Washington, DC. Prior to this he worked in the Small Business Administration for a short period. Maheu was a friend of the lawyer Edward Bennett Williams, whom he knew from the Holy Cross debate team. Whenever he needed the service of a private investigator in his cases, he would turn to Maheu for assistance.

== Howard Hughes ==
Maheu's contract with the Hughes company started in 1955, after Howard Hughes hired him to investigate an alleged suitor of his fiancée Jean Peters.

Although Maheu was for years a close confidant of Howard Hughes, he never met Hughes face-to-face, as they worked via memo and telephone. He was dismissed from Hughes' empire in 1970 due in part to a power struggle with Frank William Gay, the head of Hughes's inner circle known as the “Mormon Mafia”. Hughes wrote a manuscript letter to Chester Davis and Gay, which was published in facsimile by Life in January 1971; this publication provided Clifford Irving with a sample of Hughes' handwriting which he later used to attempt to forge Hughes' autobiography. Maheu sued Hughes for defamation of character for $50 million.

In the conference call on January 7, 1972 in which he denounced Irving's supposed autobiography of him as a hoax, Hughes was also asked why he fired Maheu, to which he replied:

Because he's a no-good, dishonest son of a bitch, and he stole me blind. ... you wouldn't think it could be possible with modern methods of bookkeeping and accounting and so forth for a thing like the Maheu theft to have occurred, but believe me, it did, because the money's gone and he's got it.

Hughes was asked later in the conference call how he felt about Maheu, to which he replied:

Bitterly is a mild way of putting it. Note, everything [Maheu] has done, everything short of murder, as a result of being discharged. I don't supposed [sic] any disgruntled employee who was discharged has even come close to Mr. Maheu's conduct. ... In light of that litigation and the struggle and harassment he has embarked up on, it's very, very difficult for me to tell you precisely the motives that led to [my leaving Las Vegas] without having some effect on the devastating, horrifying program of harassment that Maheu and his associates have launched against me.

As a result of the first set of statements by Hughes, Maheu sued the Hughes Tool Company (which had Hughes as its sole owner) once again, this time for libel; he won the suit, and was paid $2.8 million. However, this settlement was later overturned upon appeal.

== Central Intelligence Agency and other government work ==
According to Maheu associate John Gerrity, he and Maheu were summoned to then Vice President Richard Nixon's office in 1954 at the behest of the National Security Council. Nixon gave Maheu approval to employ a series of dirty tricks to wreck a pending agreement between Greek shipping magnate Aristotle Onassis and the king of Saudi Arabia.

Maheu also worked for the Central Intelligence Agency. He would later recall: "The CIA was my first steady client, giving me 'cut-out' assignments [those jobs in which the Agency could not officially be involved]." Maheu's investigative agency was said to be the model for the television series, Mission Impossible. The CIA enlisted Maheu's help to secure "female companionship" requested by King Hussein of Jordan during his visit to the USA in April 1959.

In the summer of 1960, the CIA recruited Maheu to approach the West Coast representative of the Chicago mob, Johnny Roselli. When Maheu contacted Roselli, Maheu hid the fact that he was sent by the CIA, instead portraying himself an advocate for international corporations. He offered to pay $150,000 to have Fidel Castro killed, but Roselli declined any pay. Roselli introduced Maheu to two men he referred to as "Sam Gold" and "Joe." "Sam Gold" was Sam Giancana; "Joe" was Santo Trafficante, Jr., the Tampa, Florida boss and one of the most powerful mobsters in pre-revolution Cuba. Glenn Kessler of The Washington Post explained: "After Fidel Castro led a revolution that toppled a friendly government in 1959, the CIA was desperate to eliminate him. So the agency sought out a partner equally worried about Castro—the Mafia, which had lucrative investments in Cuban casinos."

Giancana asked Maheu to wire the room of his then mistress Phyllis McGuire, singer of the McGuire Sisters, whom he suspected of having an affair with comedian Dan Rowan. Although Maheu acquiesced, the device was not planted because the agent who had been given the task of planting it was arrested. Robert F. Kennedy prohibited the prosecution of the agent and Maheu, who was soon linked to the wire attempt, at the CIA's request.

In testimony before the Church Committee in 1975, Maheu confirmed his role in the assassination plot against Castro, saying that he thought the United States "was involved in a just war." CIA documents released in 2007 provided additional details of the plot.

== Later life ==
He was interviewed for the 1988 Jack Anderson documentary American Expose: Who Killed JFK?. In 1992, Maheu published his autobiography, entitled Next to Hughes: Behind the Power and Tragic Downfall of Howard Hughes by His Closest Advisor. Maheu died in 2008 at the age of 90 in Las Vegas. The official cause of death was heart failure.

== See also ==
- 638 Ways to Kill Castro, a 2006 television documentary
- Assassination attempts on Fidel Castro
