= Operation Northwoods =

1962 proposed U.S. false flag operation against American citizens

- Part of Cuban Project, Cold War
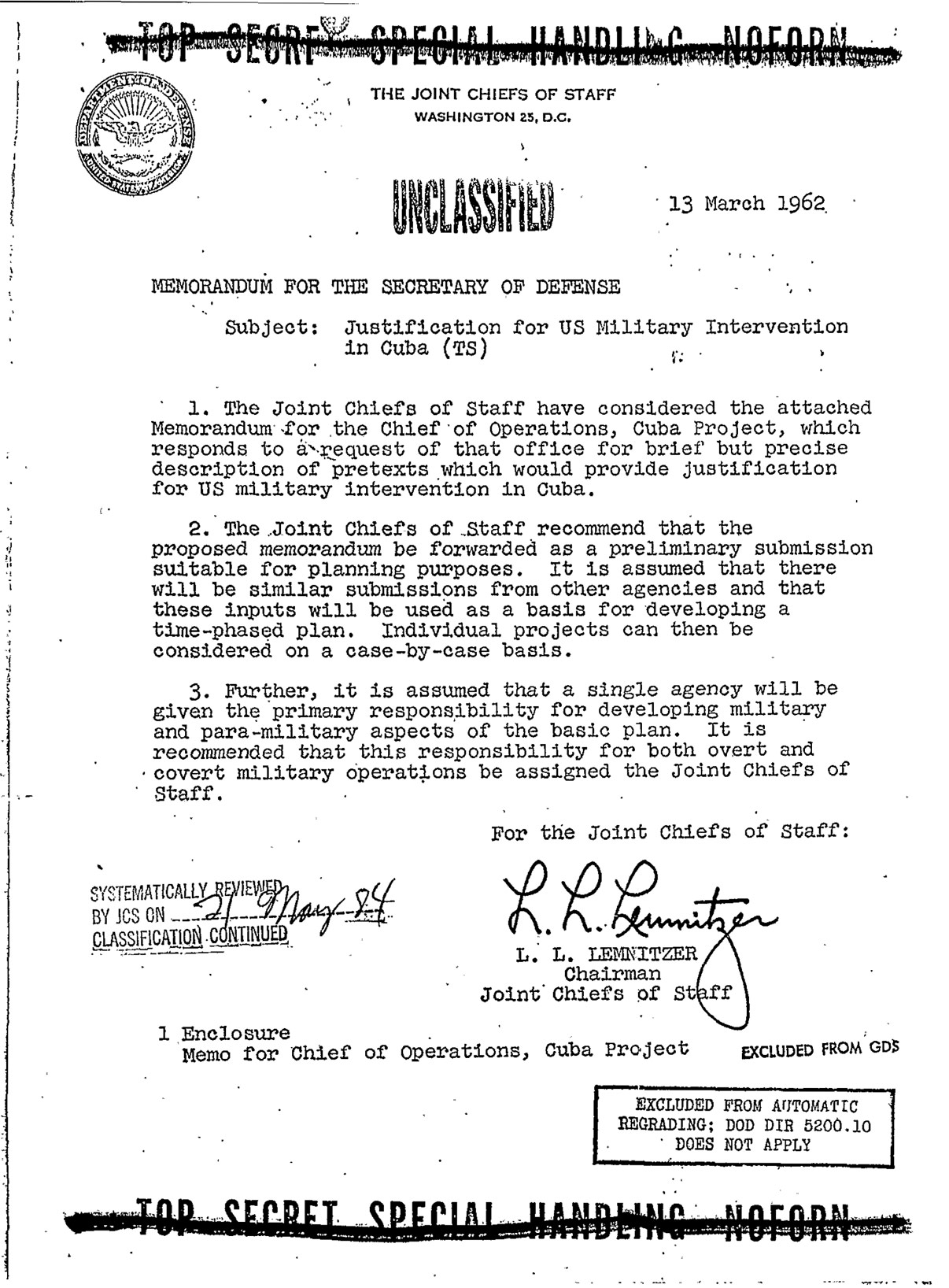
- Operation Northwoods memorandum (March 13, 1962)

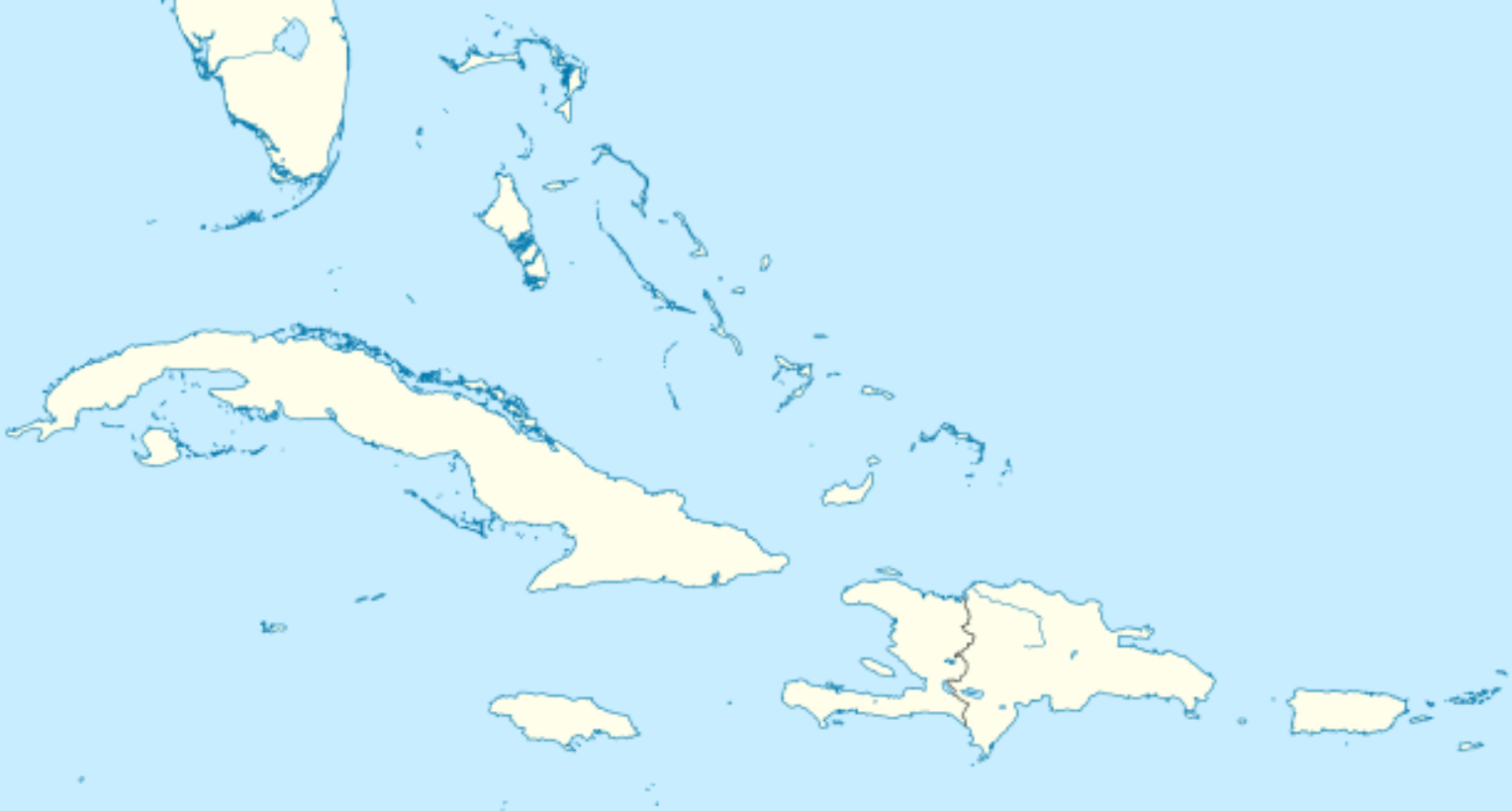
- Planned attacks in Florida and Cuba
- Location: Various US cities; Guantanamo Bay Naval Base, Cuba
- Date: March 13, 1962 (EST)
- Target: US civilians and military facilities
- Attack type: Proposed false flag operations, terrorism, assassinations, aircraft hijackings, and bombings
- Weapons: Explosives, firearms, aircraft
- Deaths: 0 (proposal only)
- Injuries: 0
- Victims: US military personnel and civilians (proposed)
- Perpetrators: Joint Chiefs of Staff under Lyman Lemnitzer (proposal), United States Department of Defense under Robert McNamara
- Assailant: Proposed use of CIA operatives
- No. of participants: Multiple coordinated proposals
- Defender: None (plan was never implemented)
- Motive: Justify US military intervention in Cuba
- Inquiry: Assassination Records Review Board (1997)

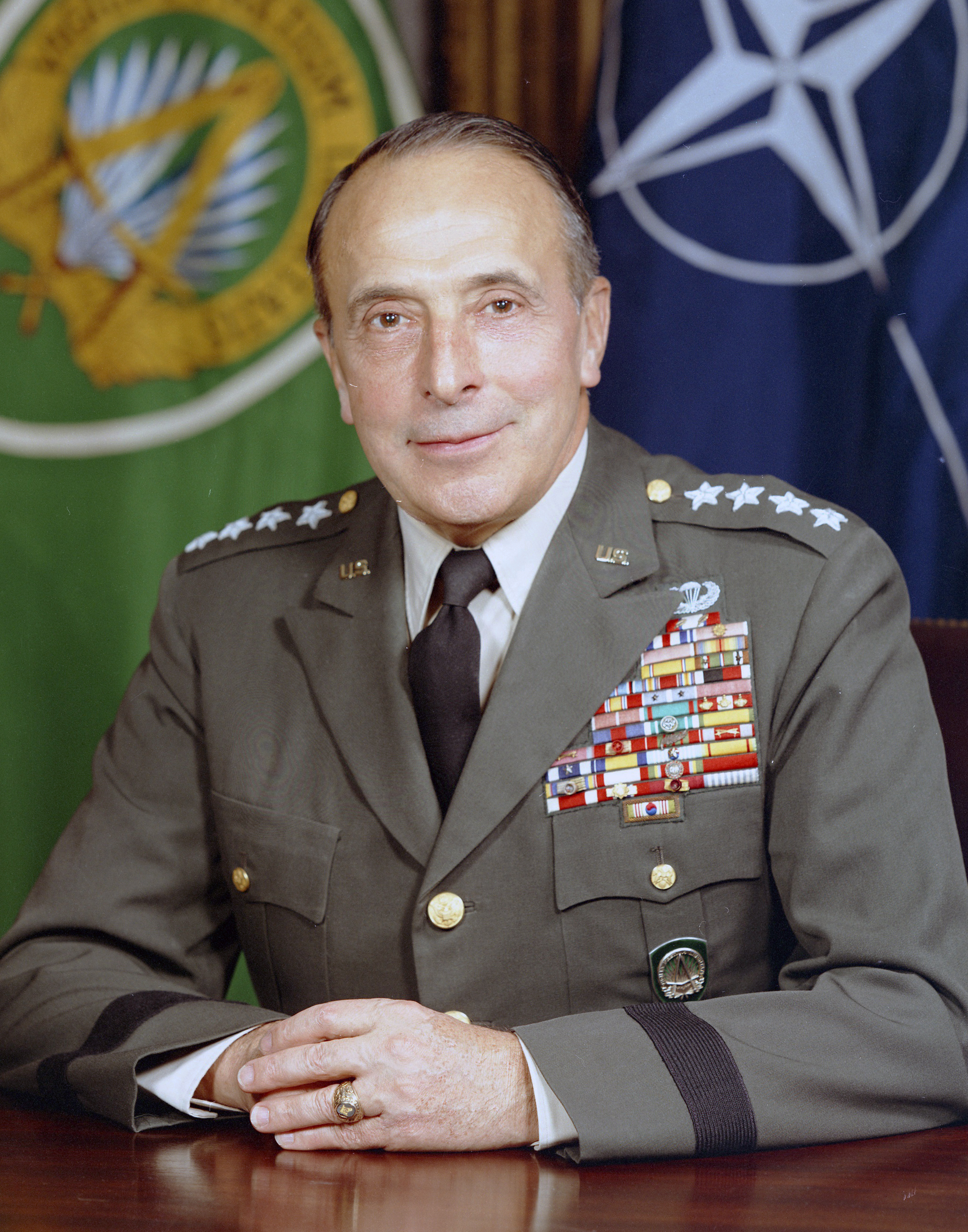
General Lyman Lemnitzer, who was in charge as the chairman of the Joint Chiefs of Staff

Operation Northwoods was a proposed false flag operation which originated within the Department of Defense of the US government in 1962. The proposals called for Central Intelligence Agency (CIA) operatives to both stage and commit acts of terrorism against US military and civilian targets, blame them on the Cuban government, and use them to justify a war against Cuba. The possibilities detailed in the document included the remote control of civilian aircraft which would be secretly repainted as US Air Force planes, a fabricated 'shoot down' of a US Air Force fighter aircraft off the coast of Cuba, the possible assassination of Cuban immigrants, sinking boats of Cuban refugees on the high seas, exploding a US ship, and orchestrating terrorism in US cities. The proposals were rejected by US President John F. Kennedy.

Fidel Castro had taken power in Cuba in 1959 and began allowing communists into the new Cuban government, nationalizing US businesses and improving relations with the Soviet Union during the Cold War, arousing the concern of the US military. The operation proposed creating public support for a war against Cuba by blaming the Cuban government for terrorist acts that would be perpetrated by the US government. Operation Northwoods proposals recommended hijackings and bombings followed by the introduction of false evidence that would implicate the Cuban government. It stated:

The desired resultant from the execution of this plan would be to place the United States in the apparent position of suffering defensible grievances from a rash and irresponsible government of Cuba and to develop an international image of a Cuban threat to peace in the Western Hemisphere.

Several other proposals were included within Operation Northwoods, including real or simulated actions against various US military and civilian targets. The operation recommended developing a "Communist Cuban terror campaign in the Miami area, in other Florida cities and even in Washington", which involved the bombing of civilian targets, which was to be blamed on the Cuban government to paint a false image of Fidel Castro and misinform the American public.

The plan was drafted by the Joint Chiefs of Staff, signed by Chairman Lyman Lemnitzer and sent to the Secretary of Defense. Although part of the US government's anti-communist Cuban Project, Operation Northwoods was never officially accepted; it was approved by the Joint Chiefs of Staff but then rejected by President Kennedy. None of the false flag operations became active under the auspices of the Operation Northwoods proposals.

== Origins and public release ==
The main Operation Northwoods proposal was presented in a document titled "Justification for U.S. Military Intervention in Cuba (TS)," a top secret collection of draft memoranda written by the Department of Defense (DoD) and the Joint Chiefs of Staff (JCS). The document was presented by the Joint Chiefs of Staff to Secretary of Defense Robert McNamara on 13 March 1962 as a preliminary submission for planning purposes. The Joint Chiefs recommended that both the covert and overt aspects of any such operation be assigned to them. The previously secret document was originally made public on 18 November 1997, by the John F. Kennedy Assassination Records Review Board, a U.S. federal agency overseeing the release of government records related to John F. Kennedy's assassination. A total of 1,521 pages of once-secret military records covering 1962 to 1964 were concomitantly declassified by said Review Board.

"Appendix to Enclosure A" and "Annex to Appendix to Enclosure A" of the Northwoods document were first published online by the National Security Archive on 6 November 1998 in a joint venture with CNN as part of its 1998 Cold War television documentary series—specifically, as a documentation supplement to "Episode 10: Cuba," which aired on 29 November 1998. "Annex to Appendix to Enclosure A" is the section of the document which contains the proposals to stage false flag terrorist attacks.

The Northwoods document was published online in a more complete form, including cover memoranda, by the National Security Archive on 30 April 2001.

== Provocations ==
Responding to a request for pretexts for military intervention by the Chief of Operations of the Cuba Project, Brig. Gen. Edward Lansdale, the document listed methods, such as false flag provocations, that the authors believed would garner support for U.S. military intervention in Cuba. According to the documents, the plan called for several steps to be taken in an attempt to provoke Cuba into an action against the United States, then blame it for "hostilities" carried out by the U.S. against its military base at Guantanamo; these would be followed by executing offensive operations there against tactical Cuban civilian targets and military emplacements, leading to "large scale United States military operations":

1. Since it would seem desirable to use legitimate provocation as the basis for U.S. military intervention in Cuba, a cover and deception plan, to include requisite preliminary actions such as had been developed in response to Task 33 c, could be executed as an initial effort to provoke Cuban reactions. Harassment plus deceptive actions to convince the Cubans of imminent invasion would be emphasized. Our military posture throughout execution of the plan will allow a rapid change from exercise to intervention if Cuban response justifies.
2. A series of well coordinated incidents will be planned to take place in and around Guantanamo to give genuine appearance of being done by hostile Cuban forces.
3. The United States would respond by executing offensive operations to secure water and power supplies, destroying artillery and mortar emplacements which threaten the base.
4. Commence large scale United States military operations.

== Related Operation Mongoose proposals ==
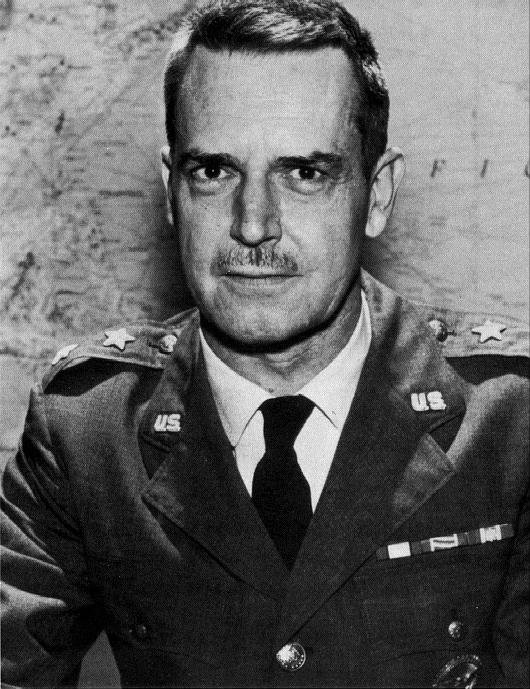
General Edward Lansdale, commander of the anti-Cuban Operation Mongoose project

In addition to Operation Northwoods, under the Operation Mongoose program the U.S. Department of Defense had a number of similar proposals for actions to be taken against the Cuban regime of Fidel Castro.

Twelve of these proposals come from a 2 February 1962 memorandum entitled "Possible Actions to Provoke, Harass or Disrupt Cuba," written by Brig. Gen. William H. Craig and submitted to Brig. Gen. Edward Lansdale, the commander of the Operation Mongoose project.

The memorandum outlines Operation Bingo, a false flag plan to "create an incident which has the appearance of an attack on U.S. facilities (GMO) in Cuba, thus providing an excuse for use of U.S. military might to overthrow the current government of Cuba."

It also includes Operation Dirty Trick, another false flag plot to blame Castro if the 1962 Mercury crewed space flight carrying John Glenn crashed, saying: "The objective is to provide irrevocable proof that, should the MERCURY manned orbit flight fail, the fault lies with the Communists et al. Cuba." It continues, "This to be accomplished by manufacturing various pieces of evidence which would prove electronic interference on the part of the Cubans."

Even after General Lemnitzer lost his job as the chairman of the Joint Chiefs of Staff, the Joint Chiefs still planned false-flag pretext operations at least into 1963. A different U.S. Department of Defense policy paper created in 1963 discussed a plan to make it appear that Cuba had attacked a member of the Organization of American States (OAS) so that the United States could retaliate. The U.S. Department of Defense document says of one of the scenarios, "A contrived 'Cuban' attack on an OAS member could be set up, and the attacked state could be urged to take measures of self-defense and request assistance from the U.S. and OAS."

The plan expressed confidence that by this action, "the U.S. could almost certainly obtain the necessary two-thirds support among OAS members for collective action against Cuba."

Included in the nations the Joint Chiefs suggested as targets for covert attacks were Jamaica and Trinidad-Tobago. Since both were members of the British Commonwealth, the Joint Chiefs hoped that by secretly attacking them and then falsely blaming Cuba, the United States could incite the people of the United Kingdom into supporting a war against Castro. As the U.S. Department of Defense report noted:

Any of the contrived situations described above are inherently, extremely risky in our democratic system in which security can be maintained, after the fact, with very great difficulty. If the decision should be made to set up a contrived situation it should be one in which participation by U.S. personnel is limited only to the most highly trusted covert personnel. This suggests the infeasibility of the use of military units for any aspect of the contrived situation."

The U.S. Department of Defense report even suggested covertly paying a person in Castro's government to stage a false flag attack against the United States: "The only area remaining for consideration then would be to bribe one of Castro's subordinate commanders to initiate an attack on Guantanamo."

== Reaction ==
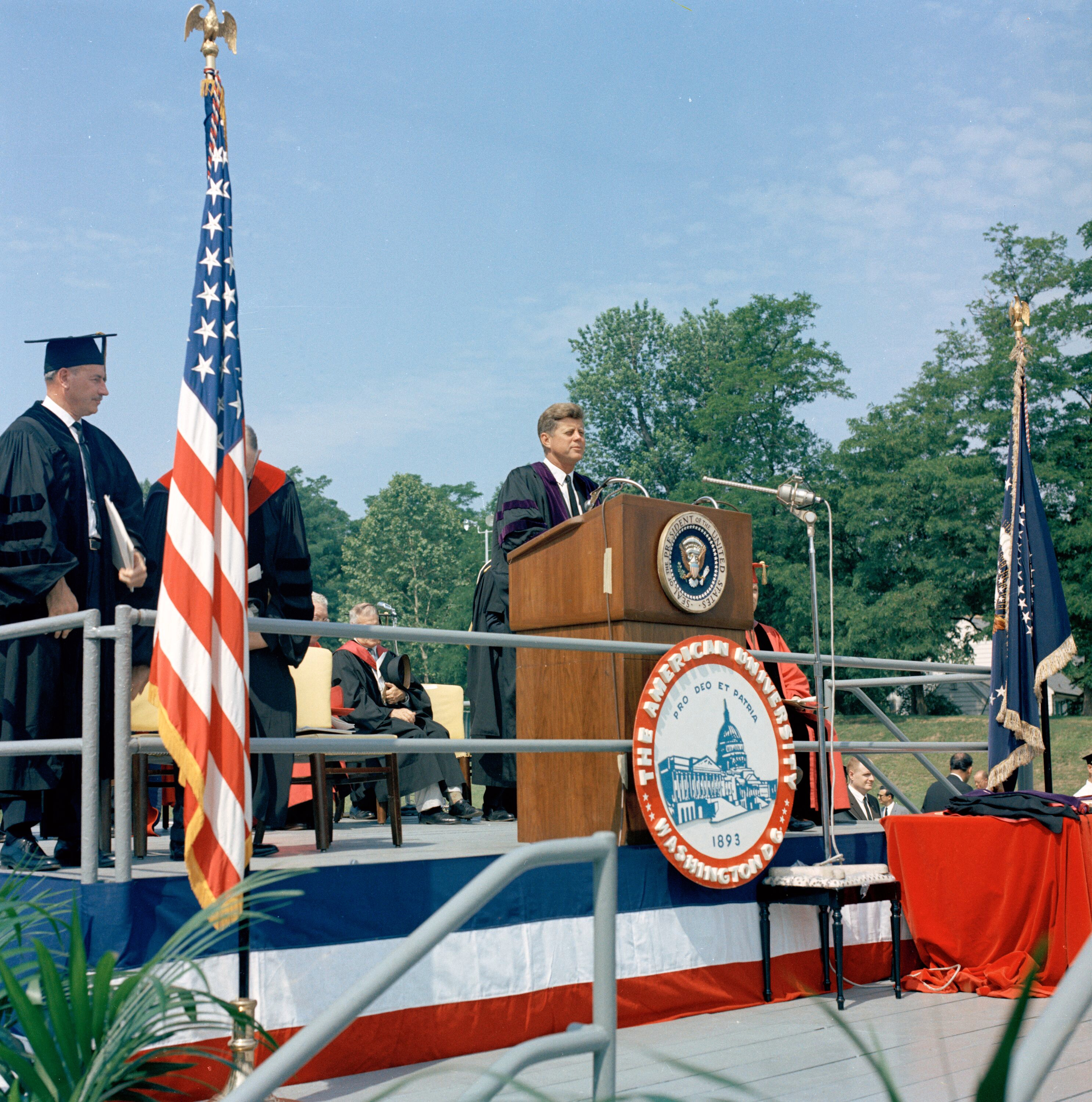
In June 1963 President Kennedy gave his memorable speech at American University, offering an olive branch to the Soviet Union in the form of a unilateral Partial Nuclear Test Ban proposal

Kennedy rejected the Northwoods proposal. A JCS/Pentagon document, a memo by Lansdale entitled MEETING WITH THE PRESIDENT, 16 MARCH 1962, reads: "General Lemnitzer commented that the military had contingency plans for U.S. intervention. Also, it had plans for creating plausible pretexts to use force, with the pretext either attacks on U.S. aircraft or a Cuban action in Latin America for which we could retaliate. The President said bluntly that we were not discussing the use of military force, that General Lemnitzer might find the U.S. so engaged in Berlin or elsewhere that he couldn't use the contemplated 4 divisions in Cuba." The proposal was sent for approval to the Secretary of Defense, Robert McNamara, but was not implemented.

Following presentation of the Northwoods plan, Kennedy removed Lemnitzer as Chairman of the Joint Chiefs of Staff, although he became Supreme Allied Commander of NATO in January 1963. U.S. military leaders began to perceive Kennedy as going soft on Cuba, and the President became increasingly unpopular with the military. A rift had already developed during Kennedy's disagreements with the service chiefs over the Cuban Missile Crisis in October 1962 and flared up again with his June 10, 1963 announcement of a unilateral U.S. Test Ban Treaty.

Physical documentation on Operation Northwoods became declassified through the John F. Kennedy Assassination Records Collection Act of 1992. This act declassified a total of four million documents, including Operation Northwoods, and was made available through the National Archives in College Park, Maryland. However, public knowledge of Operation Northwoods did not come until 2001 with the release of a book by the author James Bamford titled Body of Secrets.

On 3 August 2001, the National Assembly of People's Power of Cuba (the main legislative body of the Republic of Cuba) issued a statement referring to Operation Northwoods and Operation Mongoose wherein it condemned such U.S. government plans.

Operation Northwoods is occasionally cited in 9/11 conspiracy theories as a historical precedent for allegations that the attacks were orchestrated as a false flag operation.

== See also ==
- False flag
- USS Maine (1890)
- Gulf of Tonkin incident
- Operation Gladio
- Family Jewels (Central Intelligence Agency)
- Operation Washtub
- Proactive, Preemptive Operations Group
- Operation Himmler
- Bay of Pigs Invasion
- Operation Sea-Spray
