= Operation Mongoose =

US terrorism and sabotage campaign in Cuba

Operation Mongoose The Cuban Project

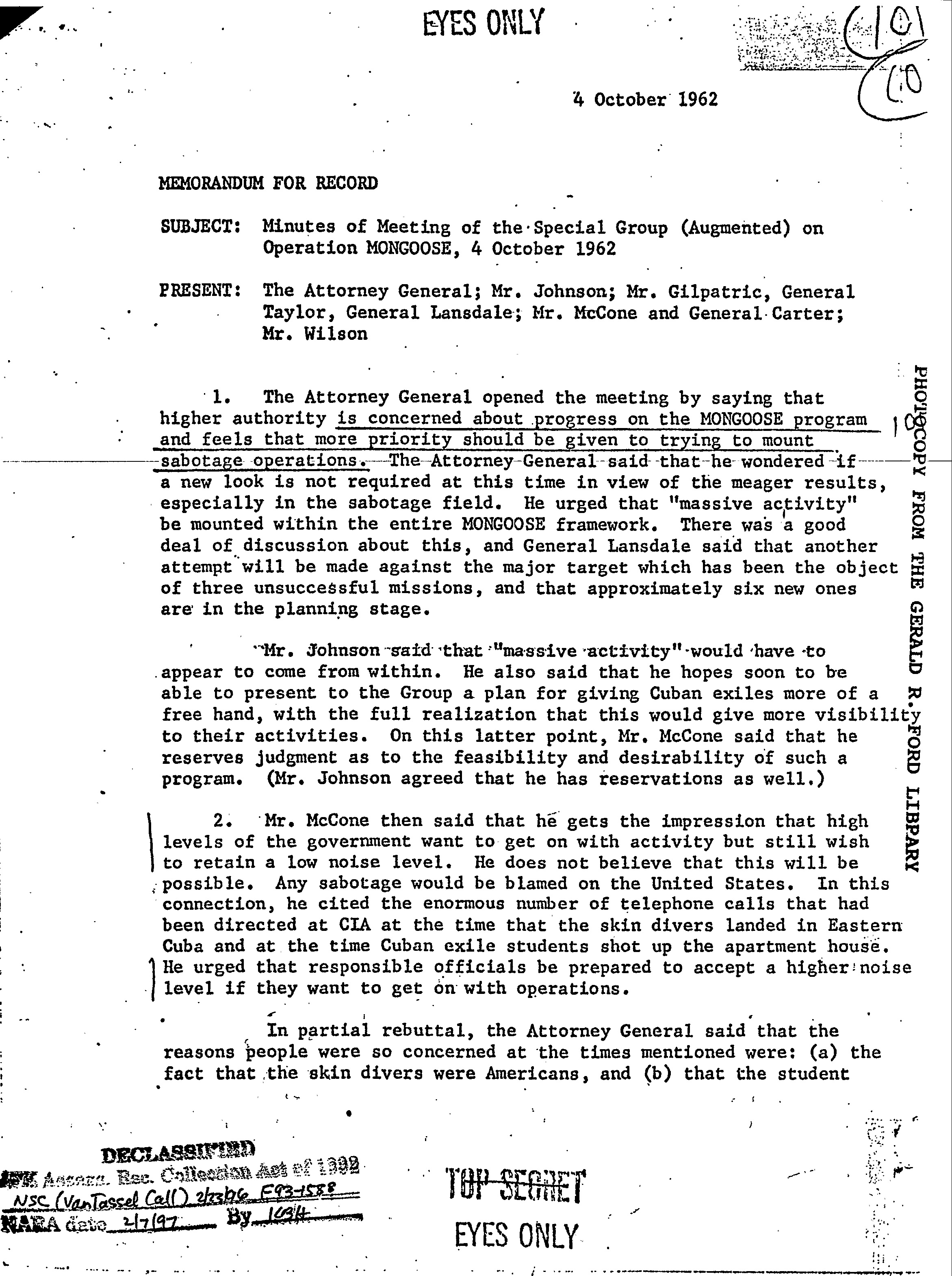
- Operation Mongoose Memorandum; October 4, 1962; First page of a meeting report

Operation Mongoose, also known as the Cuban Project, was an extensive campaign of terrorist attacks against civilians, and covert operations, carried out by the U.S. Central Intelligence Agency (CIA) in Cuba. It was officially authorized on November 30, 1961, by U.S. president John F. Kennedy. The name "Operation Mongoose" was agreed to at a White House meeting on November 4, 1961.

The operation was run out of JMWAVE, a major secret United States covert operations and intelligence gathering station on the campus of the University of Miami. The operation was led by United States Air Force general Edward Lansdale on the military side and William King Harvey at the CIA and went into effect after the failed Bay of Pigs Invasion.

Operation Mongoose was a secret program against Cuba that aimed to remove the Cuban government from power, and to force the Cuban government to introduce intrusive civil measures and divert precious resources to protect its citizens from the attacks. The removal of the Castro government was a prime focus of the Kennedy administration. The terrorist activities carried out by agents armed, organized and funded by the CIA were a further source of tension between the U.S. and Cuban governments. They were a major factor contributing to the Soviet decision to place missiles in Cuba, and in the Cuban decision to accept, leading to the Cuban Missile Crisis.

== Origins ==
Fidel Castro's ascent to power had been watched by the CIA since 1948. As he rose to power, the CIA became increasingly concerned with his actions and political views. In the late 1950s, the CIA began gathering more intelligence on Castro, suspecting that he was a communist. The organization could not initially discover hard evidence that Castro was a communist. However, the CIA remained concerned with how Castro's government took pro-communist stances. CIA intelligence concluded that Castro's close confidants, Ernesto Che Guevara and Raúl Castro Ruz, both had communist tendencies.

In November 1959, General C. P. Cabell said that Castro was not a communist, but he allowed free opportunity for the communist party in Cuba to grow and spread its message. By December, plans were already being tossed around between high-ranking U.S. foreign policy officials that called for overthrowing the Castro government. An official report from the CIA states that, by March 1960, the United States had already decided that Fidel Castro must be displaced. Due to the United States' fear of repercussions from the United Nations, the plan was kept at the highest level of secrecy, and thus "plausible deniability" was made a key focal point in American clandestine service policy.

=== Formal authorization for action ===
The government formally authorized the operation on March 17, 1960, when President Dwight Eisenhower signed off on a CIA paper titled "A Program of Covert Action Against the Castro Regime." A declassified report by Inspector General Lyman Kirkpatrick details the history of the operation, and states that the presidential order gave the agency authorization to create an organization of exiled Cubans to manage opposition programs, begin a "propaganda offensive" to draw support for the movement, create an intelligence gathering network inside Cuba, and to "develop a paramilitary force to be introduced into Cuba to organize, train and lead resistance groups against the Castro regime." The propaganda offensive employed the use of radio broadcasts and leaflets to be passed around. This measure was solely aimed at propagating support for the provisional government.

The CIA's budget estimation for this covert operation was approximately $4.4 million. The paper signed by Eisenhower was also the sole report issued by the government throughout the entire project. This highlights the U.S. government's secrecy in carrying out the operation as well as its policy of plausible deniability. The program required the agency to work around the clock and collect a large amount of detail-specific information, as well as to cooperate with other agencies. To secure the necessary financial backing, the "Bender Group" was developed as an organization that would provide American businessmen a secret avenue through which to trade with Cuban groups. On May 11, 1960, the Bender Group came to an agreement with a group called Frente Revolucionario Democratico (FRD).

Propaganda activities included using print and radio mediums to broadcast anti-Castro messages. These programs were launched all over Latin America. Large amounts of real estate were purchased by the agency for use in this operation. A base of operations was established in Miami on May 25, by using a "New York career and development firm" and "a Department of Defense contract" as covers. A communications station was also established on June 15 by using an Army operation as a cover. The agency also obtained safe houses all over Miami for different "operational purposes." The CIA also acquired properties in different US cities and abroad for various reasons.

From March through August 1960, the CIA had plans aimed at undermining Castro and his appeal to the public by sabotaging his speeches. The schemes thought up were aimed at discrediting Castro by influencing his behavior and by changing his appearance. One plan discussed was to spray his broadcast studio with a chemical compound similar to LSD. It was scrapped because the chemical was unreliable. Another plot was to lace a box of Castro's cigars with a chemical known to cause temporary disorientation. The CIA's plans to undermine Castro's public image included a plan to line his shoes with thallium salts which would cause his beard to fall out, while he was on a trip outside Cuba. He was expected to leave his shoes outside his hotel room to be polished, at which point the salts would be administered. The plan was abandoned because Castro canceled the trip.

The United States' opposition to Castro was based on the U.S. government's position that coercion inside Cuba was severe and that the government was serving as a model for radical-nationalist movements elsewhere in the Americas. A month after the failure of the Bay of Pigs Invasion, the CIA proposed a program of sabotage and terrorist attacks against civilian and military targets in Cuba. In November 1961, Attorney General Robert F. Kennedy and White House aide Richard Goodwin suggested to President Kennedy that the U.S. government begin this campaign, and it was authorized by the President. They believed that a centralized effort led by senior officials from the White House and other government agencies to remove Fidel Castro and overthrow the Cuban government was the best course of action. They also aimed to induce the Cuban government to introduce intrusive civil measures to try to prevent the attacks and the concomitant civilian deaths, as well as forcing the diversion of resources to this end. Following a meeting in the White House on November 3, 1961, this initiative became known as Operation Mongoose and would be led by Air Force Brigadier General Edward Lansdale on the military side and William King Harvey at the CIA.

Other agencies were brought in to assist with the planning and execution of Operation Mongoose. After Eisenhower's decision, it is noted in an official history of the invasion of the Bay of Pigs that "immediately following the Eisenhower decision to promote the anti-Castro program, there was a considerable degree of cooperation between the CIA and other of the concerned agencies – the Department of Defense, the Department of State, the Federal Bureau of Investigation, Immigration and Naturalization Service, and others. Representatives from the State Department, the Defense Department, and the CIA were assigned larger roles in implementing the operation's activities, while representatives from the US Information Agency and the Department of Justice were also called on occasionally to assist with the operation. As the operation's leader, Brigadier General Lansdale received briefings and updates from these agencies and reported directly to a group of high-ranking government officials, known as Special Group-Augmented (SG-A). The SG-A, chaired by Robert F. Kennedy (Attorney General), included John McCone (CIA Director), McGeorge Bundy (National Security Adviser), Alexis Johnson (State Department), Roswell Gilpatric (Defense Department), General Lyman Lemnitzer (Joint Chiefs of Staff) and General Maxwell Taylor. Although not officially members, Dean Rusk (Secretary of State) and Robert S. McNamara (Secretary of Defense) also attending meetings.

Under Eisenhower, four major forms of action were to be taken to aid anti-communist opposition in Cuba at the time. These were to: (1) provide a powerful propaganda offensive against the regime, (2) perfect a covert intelligence network within Cuba, (3) develop paramilitary forces outside of Cuba and (4) get the necessary logistical support for covert military operations on the island. At this stage, it was still not clear that these efforts would end up leading to the Bay of Pigs invasion. A document from the United States Department of State confirms that the project aimed to "help Cuba overthrow the Communist regime", including its leader Fidel Castro, and it aimed "for a revolt which can take place in Cuba by October 1962". U.S. policymakers also wanted to see "a new government with which the United States can live in peace".

Some of the outlined goals of the operations included intelligence collection and the generation of a nucleus for a popular Cuban movement, along with exploiting the potential of the underworld in Cuban cities and enlisting the cooperation of the Church to bring the women of Cuba into actions that would undermine the Communist control system. The Departments of State, Defense, and Justice were responsible for a combination of these objectives. Kennedy and the rest of SG-A hoped to dispose of the Castro regime and bring change to Cuba's political system.

The Kennedy administration, including President Kennedy, Attorney General Robert F. Kennedy, CIA director John McCone, Richard Goodwin, and Brigadier General Lansdale met on November 21, 1961, to discuss plans for Operation Mongoose. Robert Kennedy stressed the importance of immediate dynamic action to discredit the Castro regime in Cuba. He remained disappointed from the failure of the Bay of Pigs invasion just a few months prior. By the end of November, President Kennedy had finalized details for Operation Mongoose. Lansdale remained in charge of the operation, and access to knowledge of Operation Mongoose remained strictly confidential and limited. As was common throughout the Kennedy presidency, decision making would be centralized and housed within the secret Special Group (SG-A). At this time, Operation Mongoose was underway.

In a testimony given during the Taylor Committee investigation of the Bay of Pigs invasion, Marine General David Shoup admitted that no operation like the Bay of Pigs could have been covert in nature. This was admitted after a lengthy question and answer dialogue where Attorney General Robert Kennedy attempted to establish that General Shoup failed to meet his responsibilities during the Invasion. Most of the content of his, General Shoup's, answers related to transporting men and supplies to the beaches during the Bay of Pigs Invasion.

== Planning ==
The U.S. Defense Department's Joint Chiefs of Staff saw the project's ultimate objective to be to provide adequate justification for U.S. military intervention in Cuba. They requested that Secretary of Defense Robert McNamara assign them responsibility for the project, but Attorney General Robert F. Kennedy retained effective control.

On January 8, 1960, General Charles Cabell, the deputy director of Central Intelligence (DDCI), held a joint briefing on Cuba for the Department of State and the Joint Chiefs of Staff. During this meeting Colonel L. K. White had mentioned that Fidel Castro was going to need to be dealt with. At this time the DDCI also discussed the need to increase covert and semi-covert programs aimed at Castro. These programs included psychological warfare, political action, economic action, and para-military action. By the 18th of January, the DDCI had come up with various Cuban operations.

Later it was proposed that a separate branch should be created to handle everything about the anti-Castro movement. The White House division organized Branch 4 (WH/4) as the new task force to run Cuban Operations. The task force included 40 personnel, with 18 at headquarters, 20 at the Havana station, and two at Santiago base. The state department was concerned that if Castro were overthrown, then the people to come after him would be worse than him – primarily Che Guevara and Raúl Castro. So they proposed a way of getting a better leader that they approved of in his place. The CIA began to worry that their involvement with the anti-Castro movement would lead to an anti-US movement. On March 14 of 1960, Dulles presented a "General Covert Action Plan for Cuba" that would focus only on the Cuban problems. Guerrilla capacity in the anti-Castro groups both in and out of Cuba was discussed.

Richard Bissell, deputy director for Plans, asked Sheffield Edwards, Director of Security, if Edwards could establish contact with the U.S. gambling syndicate that was active in Cuba. The objective clearly was the assassination of Castro although Edwards claims that there was a studied avoidance of the term in his conversation with Bissell. Bissell recalls that the idea originated with J.C. King, then Chief of WH Division, although King now recalls having had only limited knowledge of such a plan and at a much later date – about mid-1962.

The Anti-Castro Revolutionary Council, consisting of a group of Cubans, released a press statement at a conference in New York City on March 22, 1961. The press statement announced the unification of forces against Castro and outlined the platform of their mission. The objectives consisted of overthrowing the "Communist tyranny which enslaves the people of Cuba." The press statement listed the prerogatives for agrarian policy, economic policy, systems of law, education reform, military structure, etc. It was a comprehensive plan. The press statement was implemented as another propaganda tool that the CIA felt could further their mission.

There were prerequisites for those recruited and enlisted by the CIA: they must be pro-Western, anti-Communist, politically neutral and capable of gathering other Cuban support. Specific goals were identified for Cubans on-boarded to the Cuban Opposition Front, the principal goal is to restore the 1940 Cuban constitution. The Cuban Opposition Front's purpose can be summarized as 1) to act as a beacon to attract other anti-Castro groups, 2) to serve as a scapegoat in case covert operations were discovered, and 3) to act as a potential replacement to Castro after his fall. For the Cuban Operation, the CIA made a list of potential guerilla fighters within the Cuban provinces. There were seven groups consisting each of anywhere between 180 and over 4,000 possible defectors. They consisted of political prisoners and guerillas that the CIA believed could be convinced to enlist in the operations against Castro. In response to the Soviet Union's increasing amount of weaponry as well as a growing influence of the Communist Party in Cuba, as early as June 1960, there were 500 Cuban exiles being trained as paramilitary members in order to execute the Bay of Pigs invasion, with some of those exiles being trained in Panama. Due to a declassification of thousands of pages from the CIA in 2011 (50th anniversary of the Bay of Pigs Invasion), it is now known that the CIA task force in charge of the paramilitary assault knew the operation could not succeed without becoming an open invasion supported by the U.S. military. According to Peter Kornbluh, this was the most important revelation of the declassification of the fiscal history of the CIA.

On April 12, 1961, the CIA prepared a full report on the Cuban Operation that outlined its orientation and concept. The plot against Castro would be characterized by the appearance of a "growing and increasingly effective internal resistance, helped by the activities of defeated Cuban aircraft and by the infiltration of weapons and small groups of men." (Cuban Operation) The report further emphasized particular steps to be taken to achieve the appearance of internal revolution. Miro Cardona would give public statements accentuating that the U.S. government was not involved and that any operations were performed by Cubans.

Just days later on April 16, there were initially 11 targets that were scheduled to be attacked. The list of targets later was narrowed down to 4. These 4 included the San Antonio Air Base, the Campo Libertad Air Base, and finally the naval bases located at Batabanó and Nueva Gerona. Additionally, the number of B-26 crafts to be used in the strike was reduced from 15 to 5, which ultimately limited the US air coverage. The CIA's Official History of the Bay of Pigs Operation notes that limited air cover left the Brigade air force open to attacks by Castro's forces. The document states that "There is no doubt that if there had been more JMATE aircraft and more aircrews, constant air cover would have been possible." Both Kennedys ignored the fact that limited air strikes would prevent the Brigade air force from being effective because of the risk of counterattack by the Cuban air force. A White House staffer was quoted as saying, "...the plan was to destroy Castro's air force on the ground before the battle began and then provide air support, with an anti-Castro "Air Force" consisting of some two dozen surplus planes flown by Cuban exiles. That plan failed." On the 18 April there was an air transport scheduled from the USAF and that was the best day for the Brigade B-26's mobilization to occur. During this strike there were no aircraft lost and there was a successful strike made on the Castro column moving from Playa Larga to Playa Giron. The Official History of this operation notes that there were several uncertainties as to the outcomes of various operations between April 17–19, 1961, including the number and identities of casualties of both pilots and Cuban civilians, as well as a question over the possible use of napalm by Acting Chief of the U.S. Air section Garfield Thorsrud's aircraft on April 17, 1961. The Official History notes that the use of napalm had not been officially approved until the next day, April 18, 1961; 10 days later TIDE dropped 5 B-26 bombs.

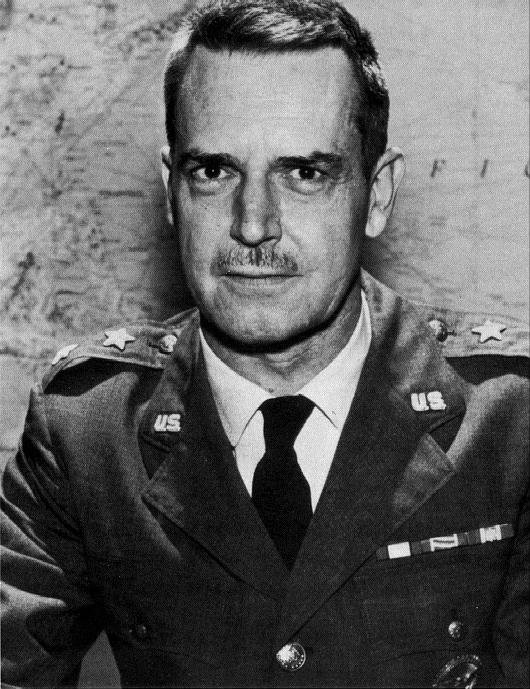
U.S. Air Force Major General Edward Lansdale, head of Operation Mongoose on the military side of the operation, with William Harvey leading the CIA effort.

Mongoose was led by Edward Lansdale at the Defense Department and William King Harvey at the CIA. Lansdale was chosen due to his experience with counter-insurgency in the Philippines during the Hukbalahap Rebellion, as well as because of his experience supporting Vietnam's Diem regime. Samuel Halpern, a CIA co-organizer, conveyed the breadth of involvement: "CIA and the US Army and military forces and Department of Commerce, and Immigration, Treasury, God knows who else – everybody was in Mongoose. It was a government-wide operation run out of Bobby Kennedy's office with Ed Lansdale as the mastermind."

During the planning of Operation Mongoose, a March 1962 CIA memorandum sought a brief but precise description of pretexts which the Joint Chiefs of Staff considered would provide justification for American military intervention in Cuba. The formerly classified memorandum depicts the way in which the CIA and the Joint Chiefs of Staff sought a reason to invade the island of Cuba that would be acceptable to the American people. The document states, "such a plan would enable a logical build-up of incidents to be combined with other seemingly unrelated events to camouflage the ultimate objective and create the necessary impression of Cuban rashness and irresponsibility on a large scale, directed at other countries as well as the United States." It proceeds to state, "The desired resultant from the execution of this plan would be to place the United States in the apparent position of suffering defensible grievances from a rash and irresponsible government of Cuba and to develop an international image of a Cuban threat to peace in the Western Hemisphere." Another significant consideration was that any U.S. military intervention in Cuba should not involve the Soviet Union. Given that Cuba was not a part of the Warsaw pact, and there had yet to be any significant evidence of a connection between Cuba and the Soviet Union, military intervention was believed to be able to take place without major consequences from the Soviet Union.

There were 32 tasks or plans (just as there were 33 living species of mongooses accepted at the time) considered under the Cuban Project, some of which were carried out. The plans varied in efficacy and intention, with propagandistic purposes for effective disruption of the Cuban government and economy. Plans included war crimes directed at civilians such as the use of U.S. Army Special Forces, destruction of Cuban sugar crops by chemical warfare, and mining of harbors.

There was a meeting of the Special Group (Augmented) in Secretary of State Dean Rusk's conference room on August 10, 1962, at which Secretary of Defense Robert McNamara broached the subject of the liquidation of Cuban leaders. The discussion resulted in a Project Mongoose action memorandum prepared by Landsdale.

On October 4, 1962, a Special Group on Operation Mongoose met to discuss proceedings. The Attorney General, Mr. Johnson, and General Lansdale were there amongst others. While they discussed some self-interests in acquiring Cuban waters for mining rights, planning military contingency plans, and attacking Guantanamo, these beliefs and ideas were not shared by all participants. By the end of the meeting, they determined four main objectives. (1) They needed more intelligence on Cuba to determine how to proceed. This would likely involve further probes by the CIA into Cuba. (2) They needed to increase the amount of sabotage their agents were involved in. The line "there should be considerably more sabotage" is underlined. (3) That regulations and restrictions needed to be realized so that the CIA as an agency and their operation agents could take some shortcuts in training and preparations. (4) That the CIA would do anything they could to dispose of Castro and stop the spread of communism into the Western Hemisphere. The 4th point reads: "All efforts should be made to develop new and imaginative approaches to the possibility of getting rid of the Castro regime.

On October 26, 1962, Castro wrote a letter to Nikita Khrushchev outlining his beliefs pertaining to what would happen in the act of aggression, and told him to rest assured that Cuba would resist and act with opposing forces of aggression.

Operation Northwoods was a plan proposed in 1962, which was signed by the Chairman of the Joint Chiefs of Staff and presented to Secretary of Defense Robert McNamara for approval, that intended to use false flag operations to justify intervention in Cuba. Among courses of action considered were real and simulated attacks on US or foreign soil which would be blamed on the Cuban government. These would have involved attacking or reporting fake attacks on Cuban exiles, damaging U.S. bases and ships, "Cuban" aircraft attacking Central American countries such as Haiti or the Dominican Republic, having shipments of arms found on nearby beaches, faking a Cuban military plane destroying an American civilian aircraft, and the possible development of other false-flag terror campaign on U.S. soil. The operation was rejected by Kennedy and never carried out. By 1962 it was shown that other nations were funding Castro's revolution.

The Cuban Project played a significant role in the events leading up to the Cuban Missile Crisis of 1962. The Project's six-phase schedule was presented by Edward Lansdale on February 20, 1962; it was overseen by Attorney General Robert Kennedy. President Kennedy was briefed on the operation's guidelines on March 16, 1962. Lansdale outlined the coordinated program of political, psychological, military, sabotage, and intelligence operations as well as assassination attempts on key political leaders. Each month since his presentation, a different method was in place to destabilize the communist regime. Some of these plans included the publication of anti-Castro political propaganda, armaments for militant opposition groups, the establishment of guerrilla bases throughout the country, and preparations for an October military intervention in Cuba. Many individual plans were devised by the CIA to assassinate Castro. None were successful.

== Execution ==
Church Committee report

JMWAVE, a CIA covert operations and intelligence gathering station at the University of Miami in Miami Dade County, Florida, was established as the operations center for Task Force W, the CIA's unit dedicated to Operation Mongoose. Agency activities were also based at the Caribbean Admission Center at Opa-Locka, Florida, and even at one point enlisted the aid of the Mafia (who were eager to regain their Cuban casino operations) to plot an assassination attempt against Castro; William Harvey was one of the CIA case officers who directly dealt with mafioso John Roselli. Roselli was introduced to the CIA by former FBI Agent Robert Mahue. Mahue had known Roselli since the 1950s and was aware of his connection to the gambling syndicate. Under the alias "John Rawlson," Roselli was tasked with recruiting Cubans from Florida to help in the assassination of Castro.

Historian Stephen Rabe writes that "scholars have understandably focused on...the Bay of Pigs invasion, the US campaign of terrorism and sabotage known as Operation Mongoose, the assassination plots against Fidel Castro, and, of course, the Cuban Missile Crisis. Less attention has been given to the state of US-Cuban relations in the aftermath of the missile crisis." Rabe writes that reports from the Church Committee reveal that from June 1963 onward, the Kennedy administration intensified its war against Cuba while the CIA integrated propaganda, economic denial, and sabotage to attack the Cuban state as well as specific targets within. One example cited is an incident where CIA agents, seeking to assassinate Castro, provided a Cuban official, Rolando Cubela Secades, with a ballpoint pen rigged with a poisonous hypodermic needle. At this time, the CIA received authorization for 13 major operations in Cuba, including attacks on an electric power plant, an oil refinery, and a sugar mill. Rabe has argued that the "Kennedy administration... showed no interest in Castro's repeated request that the United States cease its campaign of sabotage and terrorism against Cuba. Kennedy did not pursue a dual-track policy toward Cuba... The United States would entertain only proposals of surrender." Rabe further documents how "Exile groups, such as Alpha 66 and the Second Front of Escambray, staged hit-and-run raids on the island... on ships transporting goods…purchased arms in the United States and launched...attacks from the Bahamas."

Harvard Historian Jorge Domínguez states that Operation Mongoose's scope included sabotage actions against a railway bridge, petroleum storage facilities, a molasses storage container, a petroleum refinery, a power plant, a sawmill, and a floating crane. Domínguez states that "only once in [the] thousand pages of documentation did a US official raise something that resembled a faint moral objection to US government-sponsored terrorism." Actions were subsequently carried out against a petroleum refinery, a power plant, a sawmill, and a floating crane in a Cuban harbor to undermine the Cuban economy.

The Cuban Project was originally designed to culminate in October 1962 with an "open revolt and overthrow of the Communist regime." This was at the peak of the Cuban Missile Crisis, wherein the U.S. and the U.S.S.R. came alarmingly close to nuclear war over the presence of Soviet missiles in Cuba, verified by low flying aircraft on photographic missions and ground surveillance photography. The operation was suspended on October 30, 1962, but 3 of 10 six-man sabotage teams had already been deployed to Cuba.

Dominguez writes that Kennedy put a hold on Mongoose's actions as the Cuban Missile Crisis escalated (as pictures of Soviet nuclear weapons stationed on the north shore of Cuba were obtained by American intelligence via satellite reconnaissance), but "returned to its policy of sponsoring terrorism against Cuba as the confrontation with the Soviet Union lessened." However, Noam Chomsky has argued that "terrorist operations continued through the tensest moments of the missile crisis", remarking that "they were formally canceled on October 30, several days after the Kennedy and Khrushchev agreement, but went on nonetheless". Accordingly, "the Executive Committee of the National Security Council recommended various courses of action, "including ‘using selected Cuban exiles to sabotage key Cuban installations in such a manner that the action could plausibly be attributed to Cubans in Cuba’ as well as ‘sabotaging Cuban cargo and shipping, and [Soviet] Bloc cargo and shipping to Cuba."

Operation Mongoose consisted of a program of covert action, including sabotage, psychological warfare, intelligence collection, and the creation of an internal revolution against the communist government. The U.S. still lacked the capability of effectively getting information to the majority of the Cuban people. They had a trade embargo, denial of bunkering facilities, increased port security, and control procedure on transshipment, technical data, and customs inspection. The U.S. also used diplomatic means to frustrate Cuban trade negotiations in Israel, Jordan, Iran, Greece, and possibly Japan. From the outset, Lansdale and fellow members of the SG-A identified internal support for an anti-Castro movement to be the most important aspect of the operation. American organization and support for anti-Castro forces in Cuba was seen as key, which expanded American involvement from what had mostly been economic and military assistance of rebel forces. Therefore, Lansdale hoped to organize an effort within the operation, led by the CIA, to covertly build support for a popular movement within Cuba. This was a major challenge. It was difficult to identify anti-Castro forces within Cuba and there lacked a groundswell of popular support that Cuban insurgents could tap into. Within the first few months, an internal review of Operation Mongoose cited the CIA's limited capabilities to gather hard intelligence and conduct covert operations in Cuba. By January 1962, the CIA had failed to recruit suitable Cuban operatives that could infiltrate the Castro regime. The CIA and Lansdale estimated that they required 30 Cuban operatives. Lansdale criticized the CIA effort to ramp up their activities to meet Operation Mongoose's expedient timelines. Robert McCone of the CIA complained that Lansdale's timeline was too accelerated and that it would be difficult to achieve the tasks demanded in such a short timeframe.

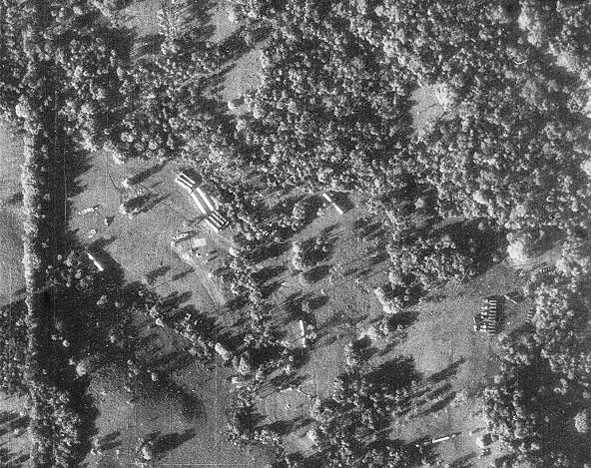
Cuban Missile Crisis: Reconnaissance picture showing the missiles

In February, Lansdale offered a comprehensive review of all Operation Mongoose activities to date. His tone was urgent, stating that "time is running against us. The Cuban people feel helpless and are losing hope fast. They need symbols of inside resistance and of outside interest soon. They need something they can join with the hope of starting to work surely towards overthrowing the regime." He asked for a ramp-up of efforts from all agencies and departments to expedite the execution of the Cuban Project. He laid out a six-part plan targeting the overthrow of the Castro government in October 1962.

In March 1962, a key intelligence report, written by the CIA, was produced for Lansdale. It showed that although roughly only a quarter of the Cuban population stood behind the Castro regime, the rest of the population was both disaffected and passive. The report writes that the passive majority of Cubans had "resigned to acceptance of the present regime as the effect government in being." The conclusion was that an internal revolt within Cuba was unlikely.

The lack of progress and promise of success through the first couple of months of the operation strained relationships within the SG-A. McCone criticized the handling of the operation, believing that "national policy was too cautious" and suggested a US military effort to train more guerrillas, and large-scale amphibious landing military exercises were conducted off the coast of North Carolina in April, 1962.

By July, the operation still showed little progress. Phase I of Operation Mongoose drew to a close. The Special Group provided plans on March 14, 1962, for the first phase of the operation until the end of July 1962. There were four main objectives for Phase 1; a. was to gather hard intelligence on the target area, b. Undertake all other political, economic, and covert actions short of creating a revolt in Cuba or the need for U.S. armed intervention, c. Be consistent with U.S. overt policy and be in the position to pull away with a minimum loss of assets in U.S. prestige, d. Continue JCS planning and essential preliminary actions for a decisive U.S. capability for intervention. During Phase I the Punta del Este conference was a major U.S. political action to isolate Castro and neutralize his influence in the Hemisphere. President Kennedy's successful visit to Mexico was another major U.S. political action with an impact upon the operation but was not directly tied to the operation. Two political operations were performed in Phase I: counter Castro-Communist propaganda exploitation of May Day and to arouse strong Hemisphere reaction to Cuban military suppression of the hunger demonstration at Cardenas in June. Another key interest for Operation Mongoose was the Cuban refugees as it was thought they wanted to overthrow the Communist regime in Havana and recapture their homeland. The refugees were given open U.S. assistance to remain in the country, yet were involved in covert actions in a limited way. Policy limitations of audibility and visibility were taken into consideration for the handling and use of the refugee potential. As Phase I drew to a close, a Phase II projected plan was written up and it considered four possibilities. The first option was to cancel operational plans and treat Cuba as a Bloc nation and protect Hemisphere from it. The next possibility was to exert all possible diplomatic, economic, psychological, and other pressures to overthrow the Castro-Communist regime without overt employment of U.S. military. Another possibility was to help the Cubans overthrow the Castro-Communist regime with a step-by-step phase to ensure success including the use of military force if required. The last possibility was to use a provocation and overthrow the Castro-Communist regime by U.S. military force. In his July review, Lansdale recommended a more aggressive short-term plan of action. He believed that time was of the essence, especially given intensified Soviet military build-up in Cuba. New plans were drawn to recruit more Cubans to infiltrate the Castro regime, to interrupt Cuban radio and television broadcasts, and to deploy commando sabotage units.

However, by late August, the Soviet military build-up in Cuba disgruntled the Kennedy administration. The fear of open military retaliation against the United States and Berlin for the US covert operations in Cuba slowed down the operation. By October, as the Cuban Missile Crisis heated up, President Kennedy demanded the cessation of Operation Mongoose. Operation Mongoose formally ceased its activities at the end of 1962.

== Assassination proposals ==
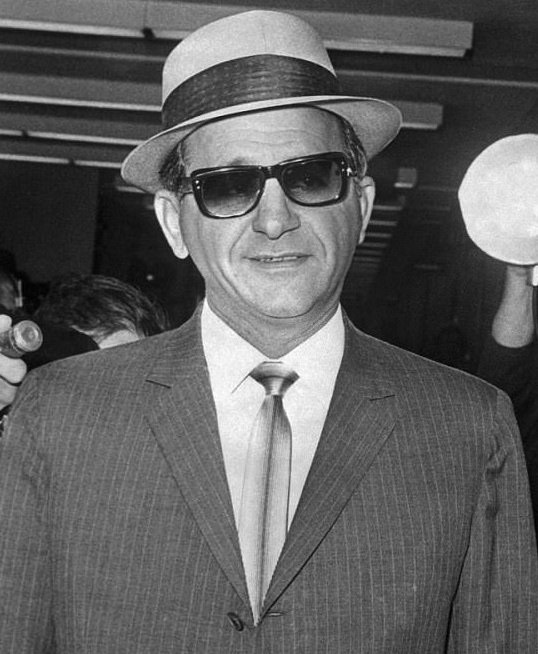
The CIA allegedly recruited Mob bosses Sam Giancana (pictured), Santo Trafficante and other mobsters to assassinate Fidel Castro.

In April 1967, the Inspector General issued a report on the various plots conceived to assassinate Fidel Castro. The report separates plots out into several time frames starting with "prior to August 1960" and ending with "Late 1962 until well into 1963". While confirmed, the assassination plots are an "imperfect history", and due to the "sensitivity of the operations being discussed", "no official records were kept regarding planning, authorizations, or the implementation of such plots". A key form of documentation used to construct the timeline of plots was oral testimony collected years after the plots were originally planned.

=== Prior to August 1960 ===
The first efforts against Castro did not start with assassination. Instead, the CIA considered many plans to undermine Castro's image. In 1960 from March through August the CIA planned to sabotage Castro's speeches. The Inspector General report details "at least three, and perhaps four, schemes that were under consideration" during a time range between March and August 1960. It is speculated that all of the schemes considered at this time could have been in the planning process at the same time. The first plan in this time frame involved an attack on the radio station Castro used to "broadcast his speeches with an aerosol spray of a chemical that produced reactions similar to those of lysergic acid (LSD)". Nothing came of this plot, because the chemical could not be relied on to produce the intended effects.

Jake Esterline claimed that a box of cigars, which was treated with chemicals, was also considered in the plot to assassinate Castro. The scheme was that the chemical would produce "temporary personality disorientation", and having "Castro smoke one before making a speech" would result in Castro making a "public spectacle of himself." Esterline later admitted that even though he could not exactly recall what the cigars were intended to do, he did not believe they were lethal. The lethality of the cigars is contradicted by Sidney Gottlieb who "remembers the scheme ... being concerned with killing". The CIA even tried to embarrass Castro by attempting to sneak thallium salts, a potent depilatory, into Castro's shoes, causing "his beard, eyebrows, and pubic hair to fall out". The idea for this plan revolved around "destroying Castro's image as 'The Beard'". The only person with memory of this plot, only identified by the alias [03], concluded "that Castro did not make the intended trip, and the scheme fell through".

A 2011 declassified CIA volume titled "Air Operations, March 1960–April 1961" from the comprehensive "Official History of the Bay of Pigs Operation," made the indication that "it was clear from the outset that air operations would play a key role in the CIA program to oust the Cuban leader." By the summer of 1960, the JMATE, a unit under the direct command of Richard Bissell and the DPD, strove to acquire "aircraft for infiltration, propaganda, and supply drops to dissent groups within Cuba." By July 1960, it became clear that "tactical air operations with combat aircraft would play a major role in JMATE plans.".

=== August 1960 to April 1961 ===
In August 1960 the CIA enlisted mobsters with "gambling syndicate contacts" to aid in the assassination of Castro. Bissell placed the origin of this idea on J.C. King whom was Chief of Western Hemisphere Division. Richard Bissell had CIA contact Robert Maheu pull in Johnny Roselli, a member of the syndicate of Las Vegas. Maheu, disguised as a personal relations executive for a company suffering severe financial losses in Cuba due to Castro's actions, offered Roselli $150,000 for the successful assassination of Castro. Roselli provided involved a co-conspirator, "Sam Gold", later to be identified as Chicago gangster Sam Giancana and "Joe, the courier", identified later as Santos Trafficante, the Cosa Nostra chieftain of Cuba.

Several schemes, in regard to the best way to deliver the syndicate poison, that were considered during this time included "(1) something highly toxic ... to be administered with a pin ... (2) bacterial material in liquid form; (3) bacterial treatment of a cigarette or cigar; and (4) a handkerchief treated with bacteria". According to Bissell, the most viable option presented was bacterial liquids. The final product, however, was solid botulin pills that would dissolve in liquid.

Roselli, along with associate "Sam Gold", used their connection to coerce Cuban official Juan Orta to perform the assassination through his gambling bills. Orta, after being provided several pills of "high lethal content", reportedly attempted the assassination multiple times but eventually pulled out after getting "cold feet". The Inspector General's report asserts that Orta had lost his access to Castro prior to him receiving the pills and thus could not complete the task. Roselli did find another officer, Dr. Anthony Verona, to perform the assassination.

=== April 1961 to late 1961 ===
The plan to assassinate Castro by poison pill was canceled after the Bay of Pigs; the Inspector General's report speculates that this attempt failed because Castro no longer visited the restaurant where the pill was supposed to be administered to him.

The second phase of the Gambling Syndicate operation began in May 1961 with Project ZRRIFLE, which was headed by Harvey. Harvey was responsible for eight assassination attempts on Castro but none of these attempts were proficient at accomplishing any foreign policy objectives. This portion of the scheme contained "an Executive Action Capability (assassination of foreign leader), a general stand-by capability to carry out assassinations when required". Project ZRRIFLE main purpose was to spot potential agents and research assassination techniques that might be used. Project ZRRIFLE and the agency's operations in Cuba funneled into on program in November 1961 when Harvey became the head of the task force for Cuba.

=== Late 1961 to late 1962 ===
Conflicting accounts in the Inspector General's report of how later events during this time period played out make it difficult to discern the path of how the Cuba task force handled its operations. However, there was a consensus that Roselli again became involved with the agency along with Verona.

=== Late 1962 until well into 1963 ===
As the months of 1962 went by, Verona constructed a team of three men to strike at Castro; however, the plans were canceled twice with the Inspector General's report citing "'conditions inside'... then the October missile crisis threw plans awry". The conclusion Harvey drew to this is that "the three militia never did leave for Cuba". The connections between Roselli and the CIA fell apart once Harvey had been notified that Roselli was on the FBI's watch list.

In his 1987 Reflections on the Cuban Missile Crisis, Raymond L. Garthoff wrote that, "By November 8 the United States had begun perceptibly to stiffen its insistence" on various issues not resolved by the October 28 Kennedy-Khrushchev agreement, "including what the Soviets could only see as an effort to backpedal on what was, for them, the key question remaining: American assurances not to attack Cuba. On that date, a Cuban covert action sabotage team dispatched from the United States successfully blew up a Cuban industrial facility." Garthoff said that sabotage had been planned before the October 28 agreement and was beyond recall when the Kennedy administration realized it was still in progress, However, "To the Soviets, this was probably seen as a subtle American reminder of its ability to harass and attempt to subvert the Castro regime." Chomsky says this sabotage killed "four hundred workers, according to a Cuban government letter to the UN secretary general.

Such direct provocations of the Cubans and Soviets ran at odds with both JFK's Missile Crisis-defusing pledge to remove US Jupiter missiles from Turkey in exchange for the withdrawal of Soviet missiles from Cuba, and efforts made towards rapprochement with Castro in the aftermath of the crisis. The missile swap had been seen by many as an even trade that saved face for both sides when considering the capabilities of each to deliver a serious strike to the other. Kennedy had subsequently sought dialogue with Castro to reverse the two nations' acrimonious relationship. As a result of the CIA's continued defiance, tensions between the President and the Agency, festering since the failed Bay of Pigs invasion, continued to escalate.

In early 1963, The CIA devised a plot to provide Castro with a diving suit contaminated with fungus and "contaminating the breathing apparatus with tubercle bacilli". The plan was never implemented but it is speculated that a diving suit had been purchased with the intention of giving it to Castro.

Various other methods of assassination that had been thought of by the CIA included exploding seashells, having a former lover slip him poison pills, and exposing him to various other poisoned items such as a fountain pen and even ice cream. Along plans to assassinate Castro was one to eliminate Rolando Cubela, a Cuban revolutionary hero. The plot for Cubela began as an operation to recruit someone close to Castro to launch a coup.

The US Senate's Church Committee of 1975 stated that it had confirmed at least eight separate CIA run plots to assassinate Castro. Fabian Escalante, who was long tasked with protecting the life of Castro, contends that there have been 638 separate CIA assassination schemes or attempts on Castro's life.

Many assassination ideas were floated by the CIA during Operation Mongoose. The most infamous was the CIA's alleged plot to capitalize on Castro's well-known love of cigars by slipping into his supply a very real and lethal "exploding cigar." While numerous sources state the exploding cigar plot as fact, at least one source asserts it to be simply a myth, and another dismisses it as mere supermarket tabloid fodder. Another suggests that the story does have its origins in the CIA, but that it was never seriously proposed by them as a plot. Rather, the plot was made up by the CIA as an intentionally "silly" idea to feed to those questioning them about their plans for Castro, in order to deflect scrutiny from more serious areas of inquiry.

Another attempt at Castro's life was by way of a fountain pen loaded with the poison Black Leaf 40 and passed to a Cuban asset in Paris the day of President Kennedy's assassination, November 22, 1963. Notably, the evidence also indicates that these two events occurred simultaneously, in the same moment. Rolando Cubela, the potential assassin, contests this account, saying Black Leaf 40 was not in the pen. U.S. Intelligence later responded to say that Black Leaf 40 was merely a suggestion, but Cubela thought that there were other poisons that would be much more effective. Overall he was unimpressed with the device. The inventor understood that Cubelo rejected the device altogether.

== Legacy ==
After Operation Mongoose was ended, the Kennedy administration made some attempts to mend relations with the Cuban government. As some documents released by George Washington University's National Security Archive reveal, this happened fairly soon after the project ended. One document comes in the form of an options paper from a Latin American specialist about how to fix relations. The document begins by suggesting that, through the CIA's attempts to assassinate Castro and topple the government, they had "been looking seriously only at one side of the coin" and that they could try the reverse side and try "quietly enticing Castro over to us." The document goes on to push for further studies into how exactly they would go about improving relations. The document also states the two possible outcomes that would come along with a better relationship with Cuba. The document states, "In the short run, we would probably be able to neutralize at least two of our main worries about Castro: the reintroduction of offensive missiles and Cuban subversion. In the long run, we would be able to work on eliminating Castro at our leisure and from a good vantage point." The effort to mend the relationships would be framed heavily by the negative relations formed due to Operation Mongoose.

One issue that caused distrust between the relations of U.S.-supported Cubans and the Agency was a shaky front due to no real agreement among the Cubans and the Agency. "The Cuban leaders wanted something to say about the course of paramilitary operations" according to an inspection done by Inspector General Pfeiffer. Questions arose within this inspection that included, "If the project had been better conceived, better organized, better staffed and better managed, would that precise issue ever had to be presented for Presidential decision at all?" Further investigation proved that the 1,500 men would not have been enough from the start against Castro's large military forces, as well as Agencies' lack of "top-flight handling," which altogether led to the complete failure of Operation Mongoose as well as the Bay of Pigs invasion.

A commission led by General Maxwell Taylor, known as the Taylor Committee, investigated the failures of the Bay of Pigs invasion. The objective was to find out who was responsible for the disaster. A memorandum from 15 August 1961 lays out the definitive conclusion of the committee: "The leaders of the operation did not always present their case with sufficient force and clarity to the senior officers of the government to allow the latter to appreciate the consequences of their decisions. This remark applies in particular to the circumstances surrounding the cancellation of the D Day strikes."

In one of his volumes of an internal report written between 1974 and 1984, CIA Chief Historian Jack Pfeiffer criticized the Taylor Committee's investigation, as it held the CIA primarily responsible for the Bay of Pigs fiasco. At the end of the fourth volume, Pfeiffer laments that Taylor had a hand in perpetuating the idea that "President Kennedy was a white knight misled by overconfident, if not mischievous, CIA activists." Pfeiffer concluded that Taylor's study suffered from two major issues: bias to positively portray Kennedy and a lack of time to prepare the report. The Taylor Committee only had three weeks to prepare the report per Kennedy's deadline, to which Pfeiffer stated, "There. is no question that the report of the Cuban Study Group suffered from the haste with which it was prepared." Pfeiffer also stated that, from the start, it should have been clear that "President Kennedy's image would remain untarnished" in the Taylor Committee report. At the end of his assessment of the Taylor Committee in volume four, Pfeiffer determined: "CIA's leadership was not without fault, but the documentary evidence included in this examination of the Taylor Committee's investigation shows that the major causes for the failure--contrary to the image which has been and continues to be popularized--were directly attributable to actions, or inactions, of the Kennedy Administration." Pfeiffer's investigation of the event culminated in five full volumes of writing. Pfeiffer intended to publish his study in the 1980s after he resigned with the intention of defending the CIA. However, the book was never published.

The fifth volume of the report was approved for release on August 9, 2016, and finally released to the public on October 31, 2016, by the CIA as part of changes to the Freedom of Information Act that "requires us to release some drafts that are responsive to FOIA requests if they are more than 25 years old," stated CIA Chief Historian David Robarge in the cover letter that announced the document's release, which came after the policy was codified by the FOIA Improvement Act of 2016. The report features new revelations, such as "[A member of the Inspector General Staff Robert Shaffer] also remembers that Kirkpatrick directed team members to destroy all of their working papers relating to the survey because of the report's sensitivity." A memo sent to Pfeiffer on June 4, 1981, from Inspector General Charles A. Briggs confirms this, stating that "We have no record of any Kirkpatrick 'working papers' on this subject. As far as we can tell, all of the OIG survey team's working papers related to the Bay of Pigs Operation survey were destroyed in accordance with Kirkpatrick's instructions." A convincing criticism of Kirkpatrick's emphasis on the CIA's personal responsibility for the events at the Bay of Pigs may be found in Pfeiffer's last book. Similar to the remainder of the Official History, the CIA historian attempts to shift the blame for "Who Lost Cuba" to other U.S. government agencies and authorities, particularly Kennedy and the White House, while defending the agency against criticism from its own Inspector General.

The Kirkpatrick report was still classified as secret when Pfeiffer initially attempted to have his criticism declassified. The expectation among those working in the agency who were involved in the anti-Castro plot was that the investigation would reveal that failure was due to a breakdown in communication between the CIA and the White House. In response to the internal publication of Lyman Kirkpatrick's Inspector General (IG) report, which Pfeiffer labeled a "thinly veiled attempt to lay full blame for the failure on Deputy Director for Plans Richard Bissell", a formal response titled "An Analysis of the Cuban Operation by the Deputy Director (Plans) Central Intelligence Agency". The "Analysis" flat out denied the validity of the charges laid against the agency by the IG report, instead claiming that the command and organizational relationships developed by the agency were correct and that the intelligence regarding Castro and internal opposition to him was as well. These two volumes were proposed to be published together, but the idea was nixed by CIA Director John McCone, who wanted to present a single CIA position on the causes of failure. Kirkpatrick wrote that the report should remain classified as it revealed multiple "operational matters, and while the full report has never been released, sections have been published in other works as part of the CIA Historical Series, but these were not considered to have a wealth of information.

=== Inspector General Report ===
The introduction of the report suggested that the actions or decisions taken by CIA officials should be judged in isolation and without reference to the agency's interrelations with other federal agencies and the White House, which Pfeiffer dismissed as "absurd". In the "Summary of Evaluation" section the issue of fate having pre-ordained the failure of the mission to overthrow Castro stating: "In evaluating the Agency's performance, it is essential to avoid grasping immediately, as many persons have done, at the explanation that the President's order cancelling the D-Day airstrikes was the chief cause of failure." Pfeiffer writes that the "cruelest blow" from the report was "the agency's failure to give the program top-flight handling that it required-- appropriate organization, staffing throughout by highly qualified personnel, and full time direction and control of the highest quality...failure at high levels to concentrate informed, unwavering scrutiny on the project and to apply experienced, unbiased judgement to the menacing situations that developed."

The report spoke of no formal arrangement of management, with Bissell explaining that "Helms would concern himself with all their operations activities while Bissell focused most of his attention on the anti-Castro effort." Another criticism was the "severe shortage of Spanish language capability among those who were assigned to the task force" throughout its life, and how even when the project employed 600 officials, Director Allen Dulles "never gave proper attention to the personnel situation". Another interesting note is how the CIA hoped that the invasion would, "like a deus ex machina, produce a 'shock', which would cause [Cuban national] defections."

The CIA was successful in persuading a judge that Pfeiffer's criticism, which brought attention to this highly sensitive Top Secret report, could compromise national security. Using the Freedom of Information Act, Peter Kornbluh and the National Security Archive compelled the CIA to declassify the Inspector General's report in 1998. The National Security Archive is still dedicated to pursuing the full declassification of the last book of the Official History of the Bay of Pigs Operation through legal means.

=== Conclusions ===
The Inspector General report presented several conclusions:

- When the scale of the operation escalated from the training of guerrilla cadres to work with dissidents inside Cuba to an air supported invasion, plausible deniability went out the window. The operator failed to recognize that the effort was both beyond the CIA's responsibility and its capability, and failed to back off.
- Because of its concentration on the planned invasion the Agency failed: "To appraise the chances of success realistically... To keep the national policymakers adequately and realistically informed of the conditions considered essential for success, and... [to] press sufficiently for prompts policy decisions in a fast moving situation."
- The Agency's relationships with the Cubans in terms of what the Inspector General regarded as the Agency's failure to take advantage of the "active participation" of the Cuban leadership; and the failure to develop any strong resistance elements inside Cuba.
- A failure to "collect adequate information on the strengths of the Castro regime and the extent of the opposition to it; and it failed to evaluate the available information correctly". A failure to make full use of the information and resources which were available within the Intelligence Directorate of the CIA. Use of such resources could have avoided the problem of the operators doing their own intelligence analysis.
- Overall bad organization, poor quality of staffing, inadequate assets (in material and personnel) and a lack of clear plans and policies.

Jack Pfeiffer's "Evaluation of Evaluations" found that the IG report made the assumption that a valid conclusion could be reached without reference to the CIA's relations with other agencies, while the DDP analysis said the plan would have worked perfectly had the airstrike taken place. He went on to say that if reviewed without reference to the four memos that made up the Taylor report, the IG and DDP documents "appear to be the results of a skunk pissing contest." As previously mentioned, there was the thought from sources close to the investigation that the IG's survey took the form that it did because Kirkpatrick wanted to inherit Bissell's job, should it become vacant - a view Pfeiffer calls "simplistic" but "basically at the heart of the matter".

In 1975, a Senate committee led by Senator Frank Church (Idaho-Democrat), investigating alleged abuses perpetrated by the United States intelligence community, issued the first in a total of fourteen reports entitled "Alleged Assassination Plots Involving Foreign Leaders." The Church Committee traced documented plots against Castro to have originated in 1962. The documents cited the contact had by the CIA with American mafioso and contract killer, John Roselli. Roselli, a firebrand, salivated to eliminate Castro to return Cuba back to the "good old days." Another even more bizarre plot involved a Cuban revolutionary hero by the name of Rolando Cubela, code-named AMLASH by the CIA. The CIA sought Cubela's participation in an assassination operation. In the fall of 1963, Desmond Fitzgerald, a high-ranking official once under the tutelage of Frank Wisner and a good friend of future CIA Director William Colby, who had served in CIA stations across the Far East during the 1950s, pursued Cubela's clandestine services. In their meetings, Fitzgerald duplicitously presented himself as US Attorney General Robert F. Kennedy's personal representative. Some scholars saw this plan-of-attack as a "carrot and stick" approach of Kennedy in dealing with Castro. Other historians, however, see these efforts by the CIA as the means to undermine President John F. Kennedy's peace initiative toward Castro. Some revisionist historians claim attempts to eliminate Castro represented a facet of a "Kennedy obsession" purportedly unshared by the rest of Washington. This notion has since been easily dispelled for two reasons: 1) Castro was not the only target of political assassination on Kennedy's agenda and 2) CIA plots to kill Castro existed both before and after Kennedy's presidential tenure.

The Cuban Project, as with the earlier Bay of Pigs invasion, is widely acknowledged as an American policy failure against Cuba. According to Noam Chomsky, it had a budget of $50 million per year, employing 2,500 people including about 500 Americans, and remained secret for 14 years, from 1961 to 1975. It was revealed in part by the Church Commission in the U.S. Senate and part "by good investigative journalism." He said that "it is possible that the operation is still ongoing [1989], but it certainly lasted throughout all the '70s."

== Media portrayals ==
In the Oliver Stone film JFK, Operation Mongoose is portrayed in flashback sequences as a training ground where, among others, Lee Harvey Oswald becomes versed in anti-Castro militia tactics.

In the third season of Godfather of Harlem a fictional version of Operation Mongoose is shown as being based in New York and continuing to operate after the Kennedy assassination in collaboration with Cuban exile José Miguel Battle Sr..

== See also ==
- El Encanto fire
- Assassination attempts on Fidel Castro
- Church Committee
- Cuba–United States relations
- Edward Lansdale § Anti-Castro campaign
- Foreign interventions by the United States
- Latin America–United States relations
- NSC 5412/2 Special Group
- Operation 40
- Operation Northwoods
- Robert McNamara § Church Committee
- United States and state-sponsored terrorism
- United States involvement in regime change in Latin America
- United States chemical weapons program
- United States biological weapons program
- War crimes
