= Proactive, Preemptive Operations Group =

Proposed United State intelligence agency

Proactive, Preemptive Operations Group (P2OG, PPOG) is a proposed U.S. intelligence agency that would employ "black world" (black operations) tactics.

The Defense Science Board (DSB) conducted a 2002, "DSB Summer Study on Special Operations and Joint Forces in Support of Countering Terrorism." Excerpts from that study, dated August 16, 2002, recommend the creation of a super-Intelligence Support Activity, an organization it dubs the Proactive, Preemptive Operations Group (P2OG), to bring together CIA and military covert action, information warfare, intelligence and cover and deception. For example, the Pentagon and CIA would work together to increase human intelligence (HUMINT), forward/operational presence and to deploy new clandestine technical capabilities. Concerning the tactics P2OG would use,

Among other things, this body would launch secret operations aimed at "stimulating reactions" among terrorists and states possessing weapons of mass destruction—that is, for instance, prodding terrorist cells into action and exposing themselves to "quick-response" attacks by U.S. forces.

Such tactics would hold "states/sub-state actors accountable" and "signal to harboring states that their sovereignty will be at risk", the briefing paper declares.

== See also ==
- Operation Northwoods
