= Sneezing powder =

Powder-like substances that induce sneezing

Sneezing powder is a group of powders or powder-like substances that induce sneezing when someone is exposed to them. This is usually done as a practical joke or prank to an unsuspecting victim.

Sneezing powders containing Veratrum album alkaloids have been linked to poisoning, including upset stomach, fainting, slowed heart rate and low blood pressure. Children are especially vulnerable.

An example of a sternutatory (sneeze-inducing) agent is helenalin (the acetate is called angustibalin). The plant containing this chamissonolide is actually eponymously called sneezeweed.

== See also ==
- Itching powder
- List of practical joke topics
- Photic sneeze reflex (sun sneezing), a genetic disorder
