= Itching powder =

Powder-like substances that induce itching

Itching powder is a powder or powder-like substance that induces itching when applied to human skin, usually as a practical joke or prank on an unsuspecting victim.

== Description and uses ==
The cause of the irritation can be mechanical, such as products containing ground rose hips. Another common ingredient is Mucuna pruriens, a type of legume that produces seedpods coated with thousands of detachable spicules (needle-like hairs). The spicules contain an enzyme, mucunain, that causes severe itching, and they have been sold commercially as itching powder. Mucuna pruriens has been used to test the efficacy of anti-itch drugs.

The term "itching powder" is colloquial; there is no one specific source of the powder. For the safety of the maker and of the victim, gloves, dust masks, and glasses are worn, as itching powder is a mouth- and eye-irritant, and caution is strongly encouraged whenever handling the processed powder. Rose hips contain prickly hairs that are used as the active ingredient, whereas the body (rather than the wing) of the samara of the bigleaf maple is covered with spiny hairs that cause skin irritation and are used to make itching powder.

Itching powder was created from Mucuna pruriens in the early-19th century as a cure for lost feeling in the epidermis. When a person would lose feeling on their skin in conditions such as paralysis, the powder (mixed with lard to form an ointment) was used as a local stimulant believed to treat the condition.

== Gallery ==
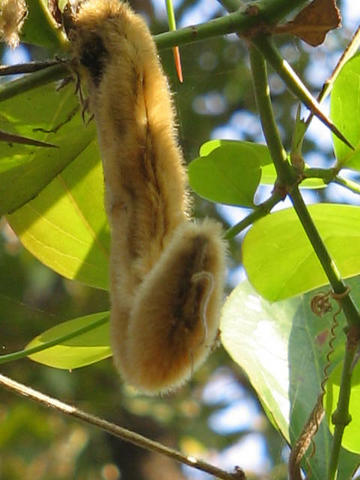
A Mucuna pruriens seedpod.

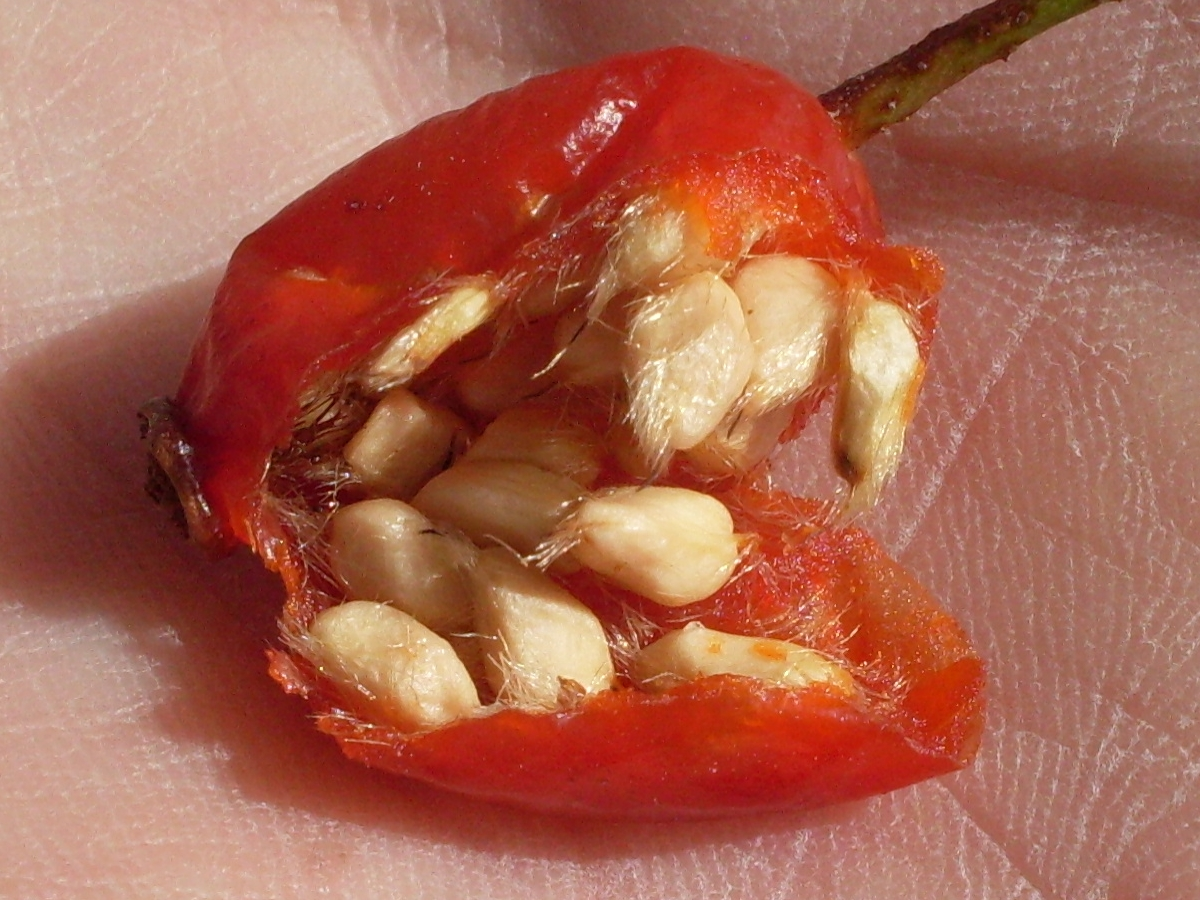
The inside of a rose hip. Prickly hairs surround the fruits.

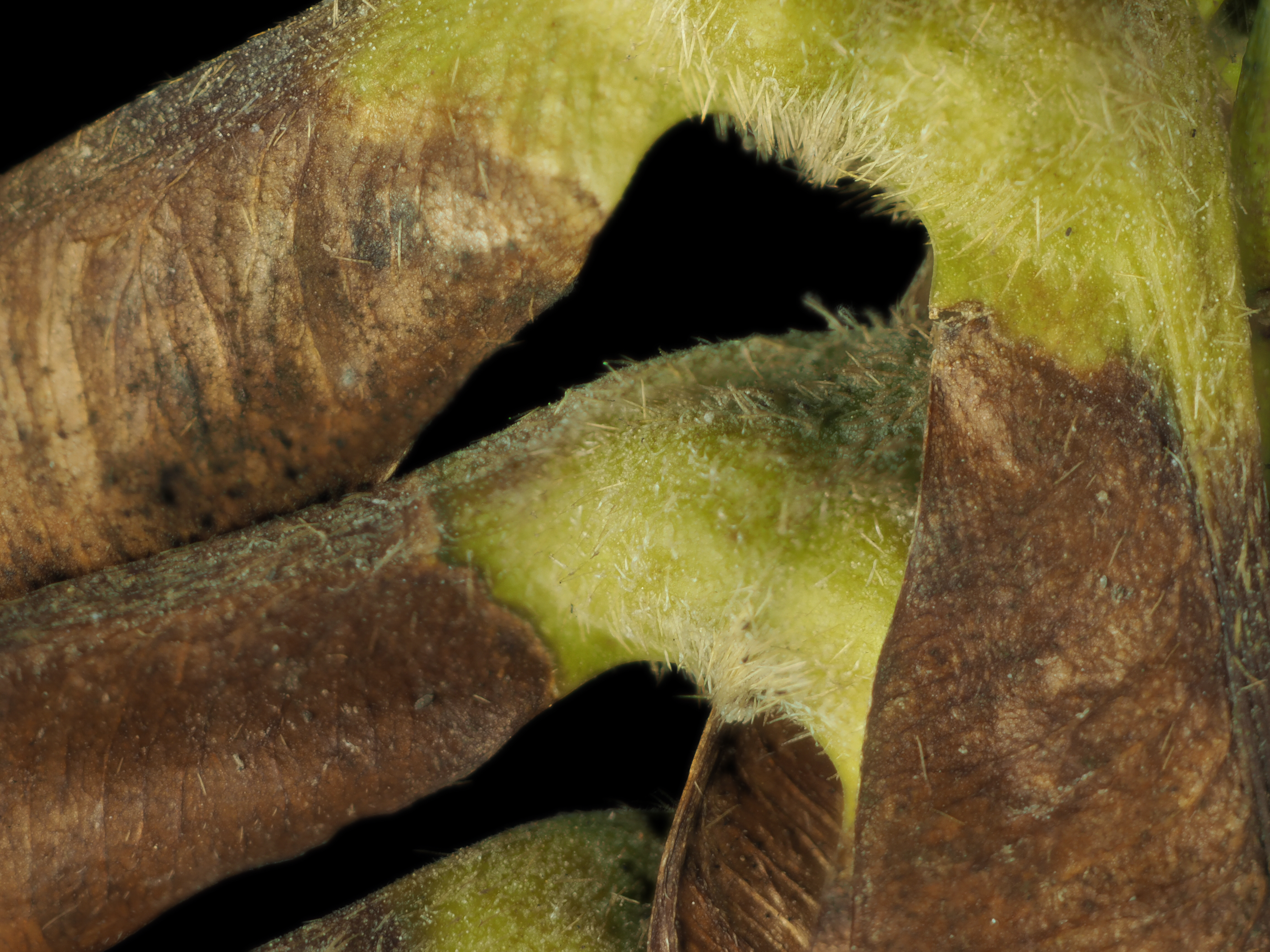
Bigleaf maple samara with spiny hairs.

== See also ==
- Sneezing powder
- List of practical joke topics
