= John Roselli =

American mobster (1905–1976)

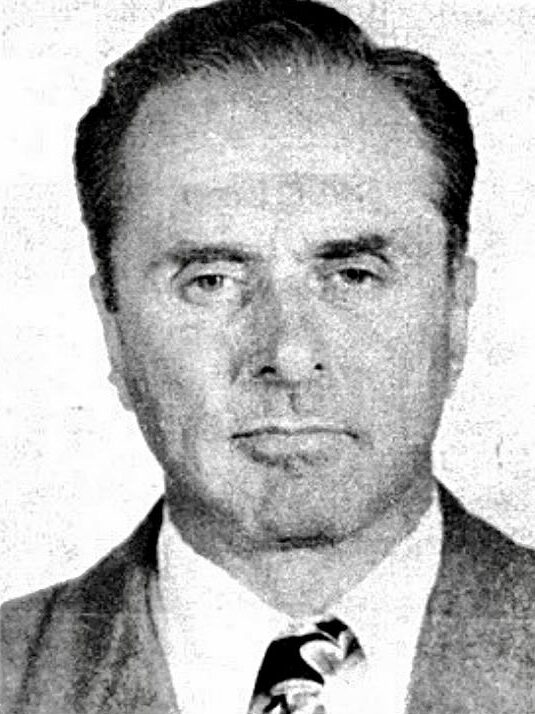
- Roselli in 1948
- Born: Filippo Sacco; July 4, 1905; Esperia, Lazio, Kingdom of Italy
- Disappeared: July 28, 1976 (aged 71)
- Died: August 7, 1976 (aged 71); Miami, Florida, U.S.
- Cause of death: Asphyxiation
- Body discovered: August 9, 1976; Dumfoundling Bay, Miami
- Other names: Handsome Johnny, John F. Stewart
- Allegiance: Chicago Outfit; Los Angeles crime family

John "Handsome Johnny" Roselli (sometimes spelled Rosselli; born Filippo Sacco; July 4, 1905 – August 7, 1976) was an Italian-American mobster associated with the Chicago Outfit who helped that organization exert influence over Hollywood and the Las Vegas Strip. Roselli was recruited by the Central Intelligence Agency (CIA) in plots to assassinate Cuban leader Fidel Castro. In July 1976 he was strangled to death with his body surfacing in an oil drum days later. His murder remains unsolved.

== Early life ==
Roselli was born Filippo Sacco on July 4, 1905, in Esperia, Lazio, Italy. His father, Vincenzo Sacco, immigrated to the United States first, followed by Filippo at the age of six, who had immigrated with his mother, Mariantonia Pascale Sacco, to Boston, Massachusetts. His father, a shoemaker in East Boston, Massachusetts, died in 1918.

== Criminal career ==
=== 1920s ===
On September 14, 1922, Sacco was arrested on narcotics charges in Massachusetts. He first fled to New York for three months before moving on to Chicago, where he changed his name from Filippo Sacco to John Roselli.

Roselli relocated to Los Angeles in 1924, pleading guilty to bootlegging that same year. Roselli began his California criminal career working for small-time bootleggers, becoming the top truck driver for Tony Cornero. Eventually, Roselli was promoted to working closely with the Cornero brothers to secure liquor imports into Southern California. He was especially important in bribing and securing the loyalty of Orange County officials, opening up their ports for the gang's use. In 1926, Tony Cornero fled to Canada, escaping a two-year bootlegging sentence. As a result of the gang's dissolution, Roselli went independent. He became further involved in several L.A.-area vice rackets, especially prostitution and gambling.

Roselli first met Al Capone in 1927 on a trip to Chicago to attend the Jack Dempsey-Gene Tunney boxing match. Capone was holding a party that night at his headquarters, Metropole Hotel, where Johnny could briefly meet him and the Chicago Outfit's inner circle. Roselli next met with Capone at the Biltmore Hotel in Downtown Los Angeles. In 1928, Capone invited Roselli to Chicago, offering him a role in his organization. Roselli was tasked with working with the Los Angeles crime family to monitor Capone's investments and facilitate cooperation between the L.A. and Chicago organizations. The Los Angeles branch of the Mafia was at the time under the leadership of Joseph Ardizzone and Roselli worked closely with Ardizzonne's underboss, Jack Dragna.

During this time, Roselli was involved with Los Angeles' offshore gambling racket. He led the mob's hostile takeover of the gambling ship Monfalcone. Roselli's underworld activities sometimes had to be put on hold while he dealt with long bouts of tuberculosis.

Roselli became close friends with film producer Bryan Foy, who brought Roselli into the movie business as a producer with Foy's small production company, Eagle Lion Studios, where Roselli is credited on several early gangster movies as a producer. Roselli was also close friends with Columbia Pictures co-founder Harry Cohn.

=== 1930s ===
In 1931, L.A. Mafia boss Joseph Ardizzone survived two assassination attempts and declared he would retire. Instead, he disappeared in October 1931 and Jack Dragna took his place as Don.

In July 1933, Frank L. Shaw began his term as the Los Angeles mayor. He established a corrupt administration where the city's underworld paid regular bribes directly to city hall. Roselli used his position in L.A.'s Mafia and deep knowledge of the city's underworld to make himself the liaison between the mayor's office and the various gangs and individuals who sent regular payoffs to city hall. This favored position with the city government helped to position Jack Dragna's organization as the preeminent criminal organization in Los Angeles under the Shaw administration.

=== 1940s–1950s ===
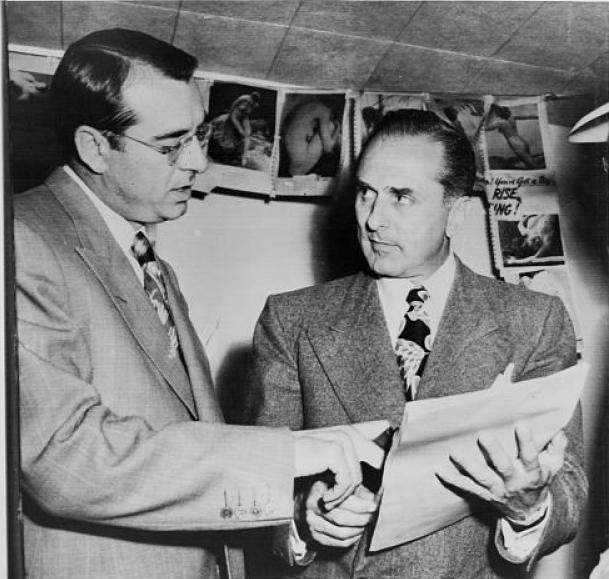
John Roselli (right) checks over a writ of habeas corpus with his lawyer, Frank DeSimone, after Roselli surrendered to U.S. Marshals in 1948.

During this period, Roselli's lawyer was Frank DeSimone; secretly a mob member, DeSimone became the L.A. mob boss when Jack Dragna died in 1956.

In 1942, Roselli was indicted on federal labor racketeering charges, along with George Brown, former president of the International Alliance of Theatrical Stage Employees union, and Willie Bioff, labor racketeer and former pimp. Later in 1942, Roselli enlisted in the United States Army, where he served for three years before receiving an undesirable discharge. It was while in the service that Roselli was convicted of the extortion scheme to extort money from Hollywood figures, in 1943, serving a prison sentence until his release in 1947.

In the mid-1950s, Roselli shifted his focus away from Hollywood and toward the fast-growing and highly profitable gambling mecca, Las Vegas. By 1956, Roselli had become the Chicago and Los Angeles mob's chief representative in Las Vegas. His job was to ensure that the Chicago mob bosses received their share of the burgeoning casino revenues through "skimming". However, according to the Los Angeles office of the Federal Bureau of Investigation (FBI), Roselli was employed as a movie producer at Monogram Studios.

=== 1960s ===
Roselli operated Santo Trafficante's club the Sans Souci. After the Cuban Revolution in January 1959, Fidel Castro closed down the casinos that the mob operated in Cuba, and attempted to drive the mobsters out of the country. This made Roselli, Chicago Outfit boss Sam Giancana and Tampa Mafia boss Santo Trafficante amenable to the idea of killing Castro.

The CIA's Family Jewels documents released in 2007, detailed how members of the Mafia were involved in the Central Intelligence Agency (CIA)'s attempts to assassinate Castro. Roselli had a particular contempt for Castro and felt in some way responsible for the Bay of Pigs invasion failure as he had encouraged individuals to take part. The documents showed that, in September 1960, the CIA recruited Robert Maheu, an ex-FBI agent and aide to Howard Hughes in Las Vegas, to approach Roselli under the pretense of representing international corporations that wanted Castro dead due to lost gambling interests. Roselli introduced Maheu to mob leaders Sam Giancana and Santo Trafficante. Supplied with six poison pills from the CIA, Giancana and Trafficante tried unsuccessfully to have people place the poison in Castro's food. Further attempts were canceled soon thereafter due to the Bay of Pigs invasion in April 1961. Roselli's main CIA acquaintance was Bill Harvey, who he developed a friendship with. Harvey's daughter took to calling Roselli "Uncle Johnny". In April 1962, Roselli was contacted by Harvey who wanted to revive the idea of poisoning Castro, however just like the first poison plot, this one also did not get far. Roselli suggested giving poison pills to Tony Varona who would forward the pills to a chef in a restaurant frequented by Castro. This suggestion was adopted, although the chef placed the pills in the freezer, making them unusable.

In 1963, singer Frank Sinatra sponsored Roselli for membership in the exclusive Los Angeles Friar's Club. Soon after his acceptance, Roselli discovered an elaborate card-cheating operation run by one of his Las Vegas friends, Maurice Friedman, and asked for his cut. The card cheating was finally discovered in July 1967 by FBI agents tailing Roselli. Scores of wealthy men, including millionaire Harry Karl, the husband of actress Debbie Reynolds, and actor Zeppo Marx, were bilked out of millions of dollars. Grant B. Cooper represented some of the defendants in the case, including Roselli. Roselli was eventually convicted and fined $55,000. During the trial, secret grand jury transcripts were discovered on the defense attorney's table. Cooper eventually pleaded guilty to contempt for possessing the documents.

In the 1960s, Immigration and Naturalization Service had also tried to deport Roselli, although were unsuccessful.

=== 1970s ===
On June 24 and September 22, 1975, Roselli testified before the Senate Select Committee to Study Governmental Operations with Respect to Intelligence Activities led by Idaho Senator Frank Church about the CIA plots to kill Castro, Operation Mongoose. Senator Church said that Roselli's testimony "filled in, in much greater detail, [the plot] and did not depart from what has been published in the press", while Senator John G. Tower, the committee vice chairman, said that Roselli had provided "details of contacts that were made" but that "It doesn't throw any new light on the situation as I see it". Roselli named only CIA officials that he had dealt with and not private individuals as he said that to do so may endanger their safety.

Shortly before Roselli testified, an unknown person shot and killed Giancana in the basement of his Illinois home. This happened just days before Giancana was to testify before the committee. Giancana's murder supposedly prompted Roselli to permanently leave Los Angeles and Las Vegas for Miami.

On April 23, 1976, Roselli was called before the committee to testify about a conspiracy to kill President John F. Kennedy. Three months after his first round of testimony on the Kennedy assassination, the Committee wanted to recall Roselli. However, at this point, he had been missing since July 28. On August 3, Tennessee Senator Howard Baker, a member of the new SSCIA, requested that the FBI investigate Roselli's disappearance.

== Death ==
On July 28, 1976, Roselli was reported missing by his sister, with whom he had been living in Plantation, Florida. A few days later his car was found parked at Miami International Airport with his golf clubs in the trunk. On August 7, ten days after his disappearance, Roselli's decomposing body was found by a fisherman in a 55-gallon steel fuel drum floating in Dumfoundling Bay near Miami. His legs were sawed off, and his body was bent in half to fit him into the container. Chains tied to the drum were unsuccessful in preventing it from resurfacing. He had died of asphyxiation. At the time, federal investigators suggested he may have been killed by Chicago mobsters for keeping an unfair share of the mob's gambling interests in Las Vegas. At the behest of some members of the United States Senate, United States Attorney General Edward H. Levi instructed the FBI to find out if Roselli's earlier testimony regarding the CIA plot to assassinate Castro may have led to his murder. The FBI investigation found that Roselli was killed by Frank "The German" Schweihs, Vincent Incerro and two other suspects. The contract was sanctioned by the Chicago Outfit's consigliere, Tony Accardo because "Roselli was becoming a public source of embarrassment to La Cosa Nostra".

== JFK conspiracy allegations ==
After Roselli's death, journalists Jack Anderson and Les Whitten published an editorial stating that Roselli had told associates that underworld assassins had been discovered by Castro plotting to kill him. Castro, supposedly believing Kennedy responsible for the plot, turned the assassins and sent them to kill Kennedy. Roselli stated that Oswald was framed by these individuals. At the time Roselli was facing racketeering charges and possible deportation. In the 1970s the House Select Committee on Assassinations, set up to reinvestigate the Kennedy murder, concluded that "the public dissemination of the details of the plots correspond remarkably with the efforts of John Roselli to prevent his deportation [and] prosecution…. These coincidences plus other evidence indicate that John Roselli manipulated the facts of the plot into a retaliation theory in efforts to force the CIA to intervene favorably in his legal affair".

Bill Bonanno, the son of Cosa Nostra boss Joseph Bonanno, claimed in his 1999 memoir, Bound by Honor: A Mafioso's Story, that he had discussed the assassination of Kennedy with Roselli and implicated him as the primary hitman in a conspiracy instigated by the mob. According to Bonanno, Roselli fired at Kennedy from a storm drain on Elm Street. In 2006, the Discovery Channel aired an hour-long television documentary entitled Conspiracy Files: JFK. Based on information in the book Ultimate Sacrifice by Lamar Waldron, the program asserted that Roselli was responsible for framing Abraham Bolden who was arrested the day before he was to appear before the Warren Commission. In 2010, Playboy magazine published an article by Hillel Levin in which Roselli was also implicated in the assassination by Robert "Tosh" Plumlee and James Files, an inmate within the Illinois Department of Corrections.

== In popular culture ==
In the CBS television drama Vegas, the character from the Chicago Mob Johnny Rizzo, portrayed by Michael Wiseman, is loosely based on Johnny Roselli, as when Rizzo is introduced. Rizzo is in the Vegas black book and is not allowed to be in any casino. When Sheriff Ralph Lamb catches Rizzo in one, he demands that Rizzo leave. Rizzo, known for his temper, gets into a fight, and is easily subdued by Lamb. This is based on an actual event involving the real Sheriff Lamb and Roselli.

Roselli was portrayed by Chuck Shamata in the 2007 TNT miniseries The Company, which portrayed Roselli's role in the CIA's unsuccessful attempts to assassinate Fidel Castro. Tony Lo Bianco played Roselli in Oliver Stone's Nixon (1995). He has also been portrayed in various television films, including Sugartime (1995) by Sam Grana, The Rat Pack (1998) by Joe Cortese, Bonanno: A Godfather's Story (1999) by Bruno Di Quenzio, and Power and Beauty (2002) by Tony Nappo.

Roselli and gangster Sam Giancana and their involvement with the CIA are the focus of a 2024 Paramount+ docuseries "Mafia Spies" based on the book by Thomas Maier. John Travolta plays Roselli in the movie November 1963 (2026).

== See also ==
- Assassination attempts on Fidel Castro
- List of solved missing person cases: 1950–1999
