= Cup (disambiguation) =

A cup is an open-top container used to hold liquids for pouring or drinking.

Cup, CUP, cups or CUPS may also refer to:

== Cooking ==
- Cup (unit), a measure of volume
  - Measuring cup, a kitchen utensil
- Cup, a style of English punch

== Businesses and organisations ==
- Cambridge University Press, in England
- Canadian University Press, an association of student newspapers in Canada
- Columbia University Press, in the United States
- Center for Urban Pedagogy, an American nonprofit organization
- China UnionPay, a Chinese financial services corporation
- China University of Petroleum
- City University of Pasay, a university in Metro Manila, Philippines
- Committee of Union and Progress, several revolutionary groups and a political party in the Ottoman Empire and Republic of Turkey
- Popular Unity Candidacy (Candidatura d'Unitat Popular, CUP), a political party in Catalonia
- Conservative and Unionist Party (full name of the Tory Party)

== Games and sports ==
- Trophy, often a cup, awarded for sporting events
- Athletic cup, protective equipment for male athletes' genitalia
- Cup game, a clapping game that involves tapping and hitting a cup using a defined rhythm
- Cups (game), a form of mancala
- Cups, a fictional game in an episode of the sitcom Friends
- Suit of cups, a suit in tarot cards
- Cups (suit), one of the four suits in Latin-suited playing cards
- Collectif Ultras Paris, a supporters group of Paris Saint-Germain F.C.
- Single-elimination tournament, the most common format of national cups in association football

== Music ==
- "Cups" (song), a song released by Anna Kendrick in 2012, and by others
- "Cups", a song by Roy Nathanson and Debbie Harry from the 2000 album Fire at Keaton's Bar and Grill
- "Cups", a song by Underworld from the 1999 album Beaucoup Fish

== Science and technology ==
- Cancer of unknown primary origin
- CUPS (Common Unix Printing System), a Unix print server
- Consortium for Upper-level Physics Software, a software-development project by Robert Ehrlich and others
- Copper units of pressure, pressure measurements in firearms
- ∪, a symbol used to represent union in set theory
- Cup product in algebraic topology, denoted by the operator $\smile$
- Cursor Position (ANSI), an ANSI X3.64 escape sequence

== Other uses ==
- Cups (app), a mobile app for coffee
- Cup, a component of bra size
- Comparable uncontrolled price, a method used in transfer pricing
- Central Utah Project, an American federal water project
- Cuban peso, the currency of Cuba, ISO 4217 code CUP
- Cupar railway station, Scotland, station code CUP
- Cup (film), a 2024 Indian Malayalam-language sports drama film

== See also ==
- The Cup (disambiguation)
- Cupp (disambiguation)
- Cup and ring mark, a form of prehistoric art
- Cupping therapy, a form of pseudoscience
- Friendship cup
- Fuddling cup, a three-dimensional puzzle
- Menstrual cup, a menstrual hygiene device
- Silphium perfoliatum or cup-plant, a member of the sunflower family
- Kup (disambiguation)
- Kups (disambiguation)
