= Mug =

Type of cup

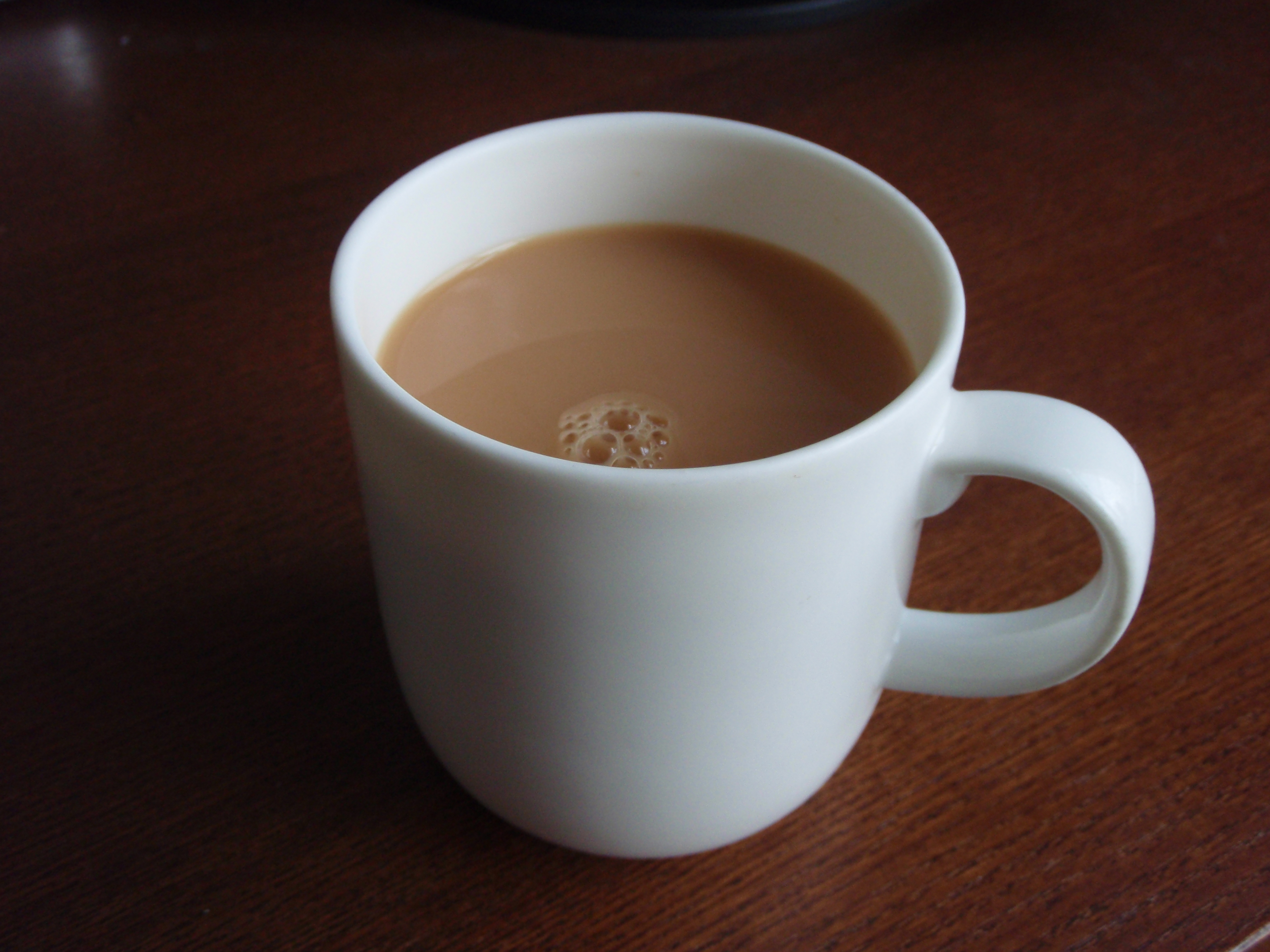
A mug of tea with milk

A mug is a type of cup, a drinking vessel usually intended for hot drinks such as coffee, hot chocolate, or tea. Mugs have handles and usually hold a larger amount of fluid than other types of cups such as teacups or coffee cups. Typically, a mug holds approximately 250–350 ml (8–12 US fl oz) of liquid. A mug-shaped vessel much larger than this tends to be called a tankard.

Mugs typically have a straight-line profile, either perpendicular or flaring. However, this is not defining for the form, and a curving profile is possible. A single vertical handle is essential (otherwise the vessel is a beaker), as is the lack of a matching saucer. A mug is a less formal style of drink container and is not usually used in formal place settings, where a teacup or coffee cup is preferred. Shaving mugs are used to assist in wet shaving.

Ancient mugs were usually carved in wood or made of pottery, while most modern ones are made of pottery materials such as bone china, earthenware, porcelain, or stoneware. Large mugs, typically made of metal or pottery and used for drinking beer, are likely to be called tankards. Some mugs are made from strengthened glass, such as Pyrex. Other materials, including enameled metal, plastic, or steel, are preferred, when reduced weight or resistance to breakage is at a premium, such as for camping. A travel mug is insulated and has a cover with a small sipping opening to prevent spills. Techniques such as silk screen printing or decals are used to apply decorations such as logos or images and fan art, which are fired onto the mug to ensure permanence.

== General design and functions ==
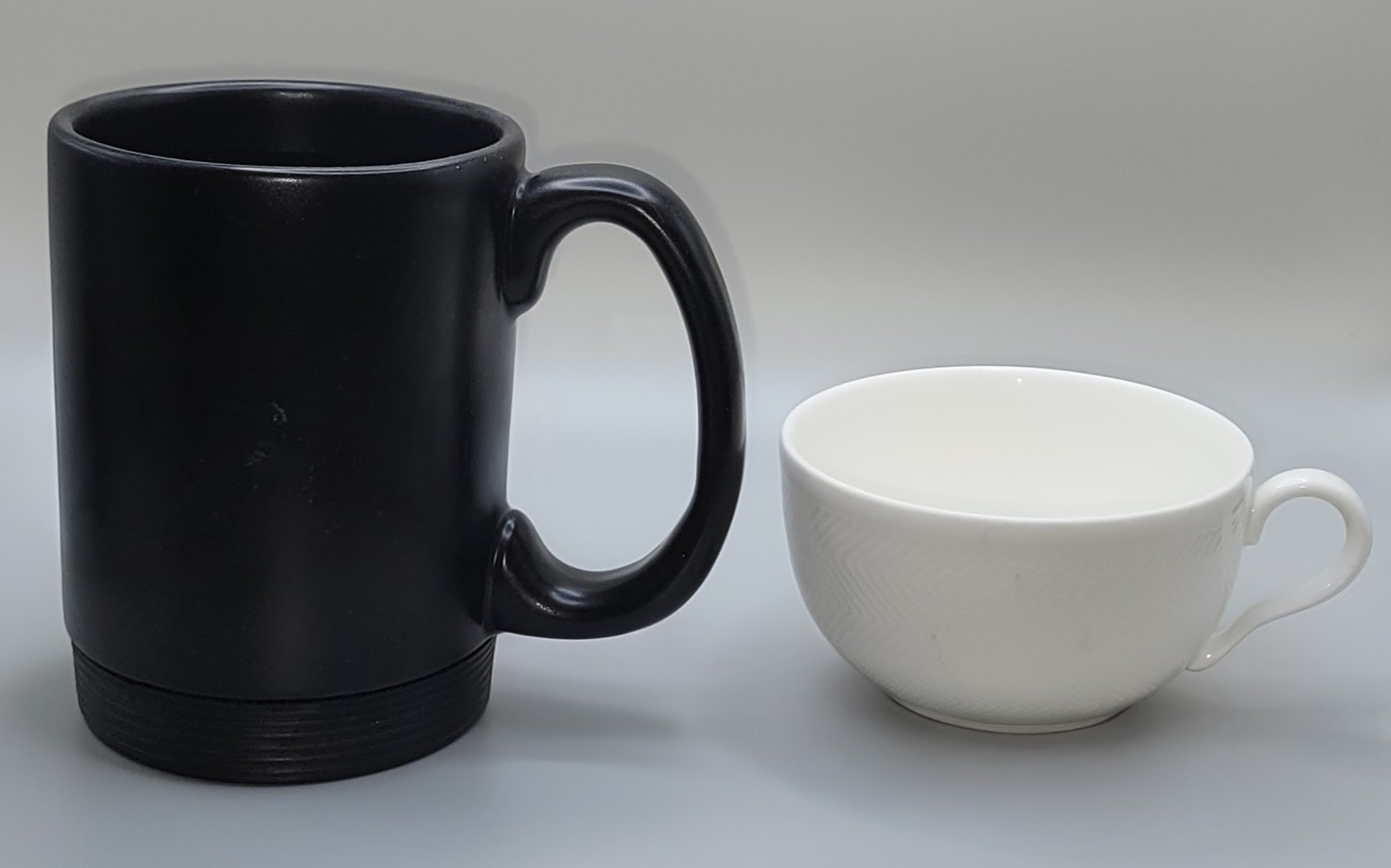
A mug and a cup side-by-side

Much of the mug design aims at thermal insulation: the thick walls of a mug, as compared to the thinner walls of teacups, insulate the beverage to prevent it from cooling or warming quickly. The mug bottom is often not flat, but either concave or has an extra rim, to reduce the thermal contact with the surface on which a mug is placed. These features often leave a characteristic circular stain on the surface. Finally, the handle of a mug keeps the hand away from the hot sides of a mug. The small cross section of the handle reduces heat flow between the liquid and the hand. For the same reason of thermal insulation, mugs are usually made of materials with low thermal conductivity, such as earthenware, bone china, porcelain, or glass.

=== Difference from cups ===
Many languages including French, Italian, Polish, Russian, German, and English use two separate words for mugs and traditional cups. Translator Anna Wierzbicka suggested that this is due to a slightly different functionality: traditional cups are designed for drinking while sitting at the table, while a mug is designed to be used anywhere.

== History ==
=== Early mugs ===
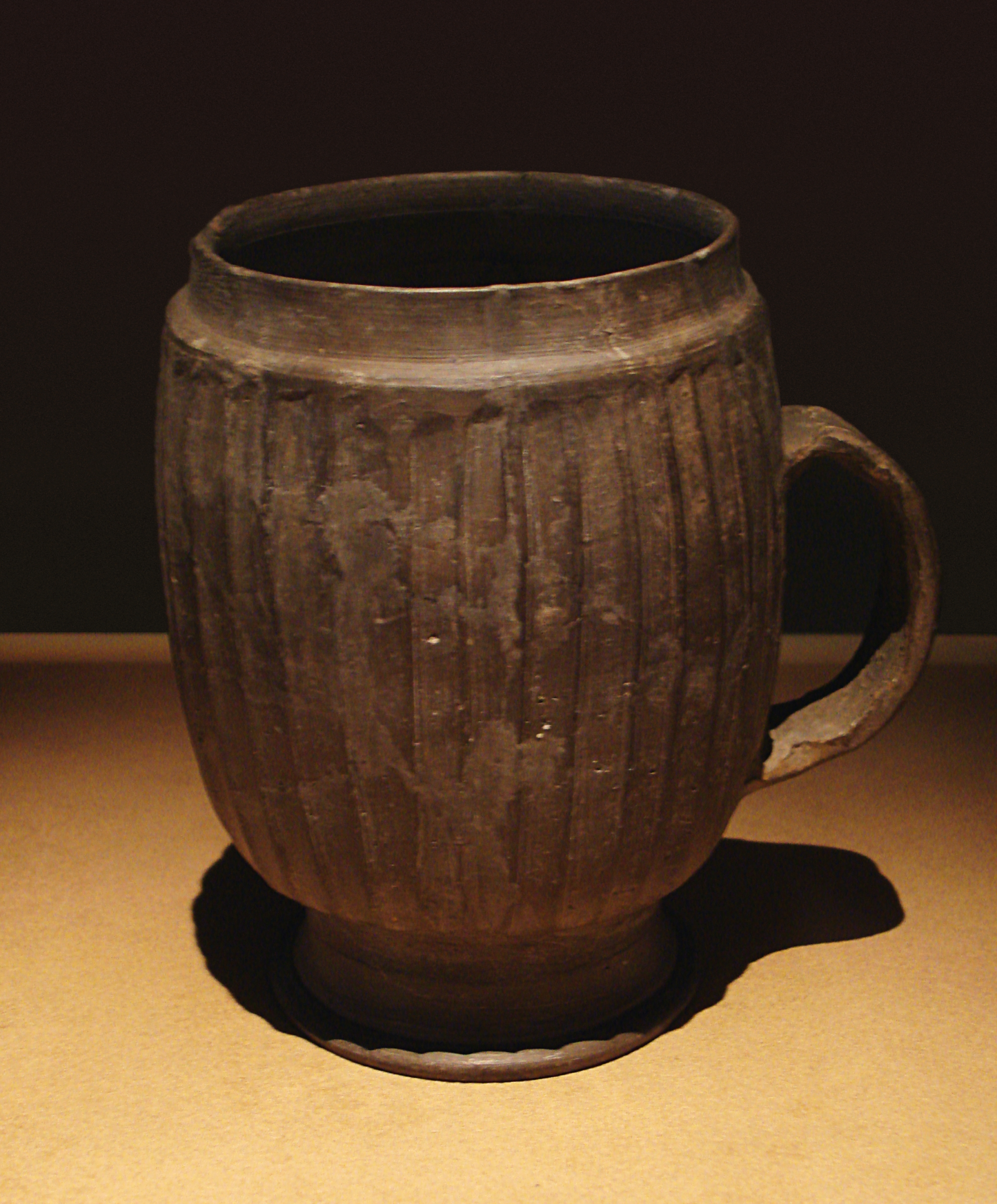
A mug made on a potter's wheel in the Late Neolithic Period (c. 2500–2000 BC) in Zhengzhou, China

Though today mugs are associated with hot drinks, milk and soft drinks, many early mugs appear to have been mostly used for beer or other alcoholic drinks, and were often larger than modern mugs. Wooden mugs were produced probably from the earliest days of woodworking, but most of them have not survived or stayed intact.

The first pottery was shaped by hand and was later facilitated by the invention of the potter's wheel (date unknown, between 6,500 and 3000 BC). It was relatively easy to add a handle to a cup in the process thus producing a mug. For example, a rather advanced, decorated clay mug from 4000 to 5000 BC was found in Greece.

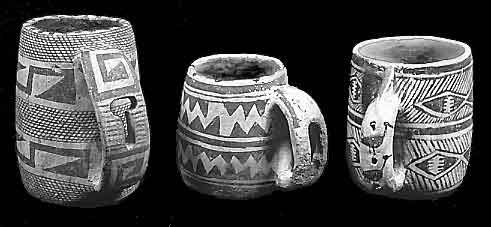
Ancestral Pueblo (Anasazi) mugs from SW Colorado, made between 1000 and 1280 AD. The meaning of the carving in the handles is as yet unknown, but it is probably not functional.

The biggest disadvantage of those clay mugs was thick walls unfit for the mouth. The walls were thinned with development of metalworking techniques. Metal mugs were produced from bronze, silver, gold, and even lead, starting from roughly 2000 BC, but were hard to use with hot drinks.

The invention of porcelain around 600 AD in China brought a new era of thin-walled mugs suitable both for cold and hot liquids, which are enjoyed today.

The earliest known use of the word mug for its current meaning occurred in 1664.

=== Victor coffee mug ===
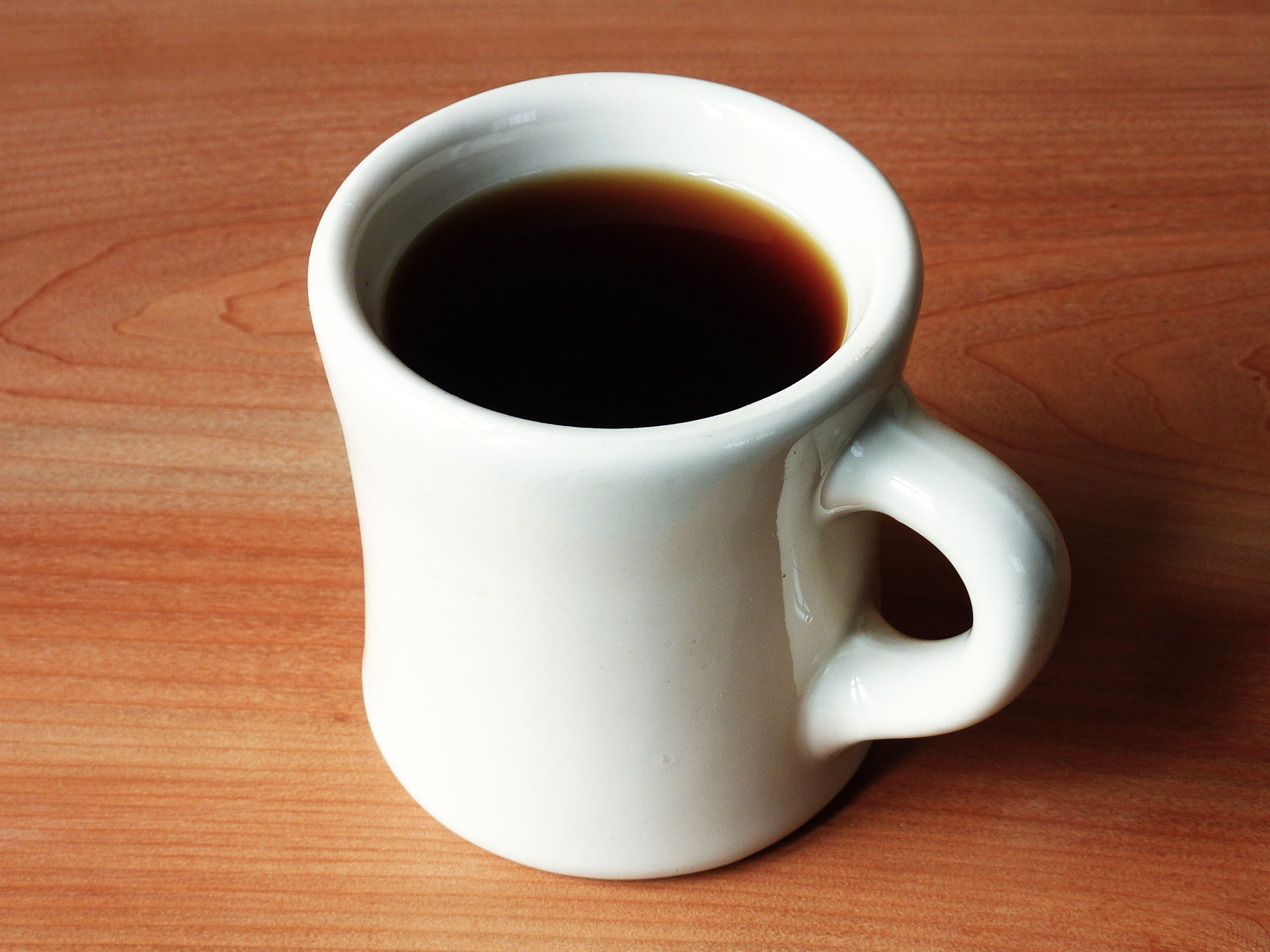
VICTOR coffee mug

During World War II, the United States Navy put out a bid for American companies to design a coffee mug that was resistant to falling over and could survive use on ships. Many designs were proposed, but they ultimately settled on one from Victor Insulators, a high-voltage porcelain insulator manufacturer. Demand for insulators had declined during the war, and Victor branched into making sanitaryware to help support their operations.

The company developed a white-glazed, thick-walled mug without handles for naval use, which was well-received by the military. By making mugs from the same porcelain that Victor made their insulators out of, the cups were reported to have excellent insulative properties.

After the war ended, Victor decided to continue production of some sanitaryware pieces and created a more commercial-friendly variant of their mug, designed with a handle and gently tapered body, along with expanded color options. The mug's design came to be widely imitated by other manufacturers both within and outside the United States. Eventually Victor faced so much competition from cheaper Chinese-made imitations that the company was forced to cease production of mugs in early 1990. Since then, remaining Victor mugs have become sought after by collectors.

== Subtypes ==
=== Travel mugs ===
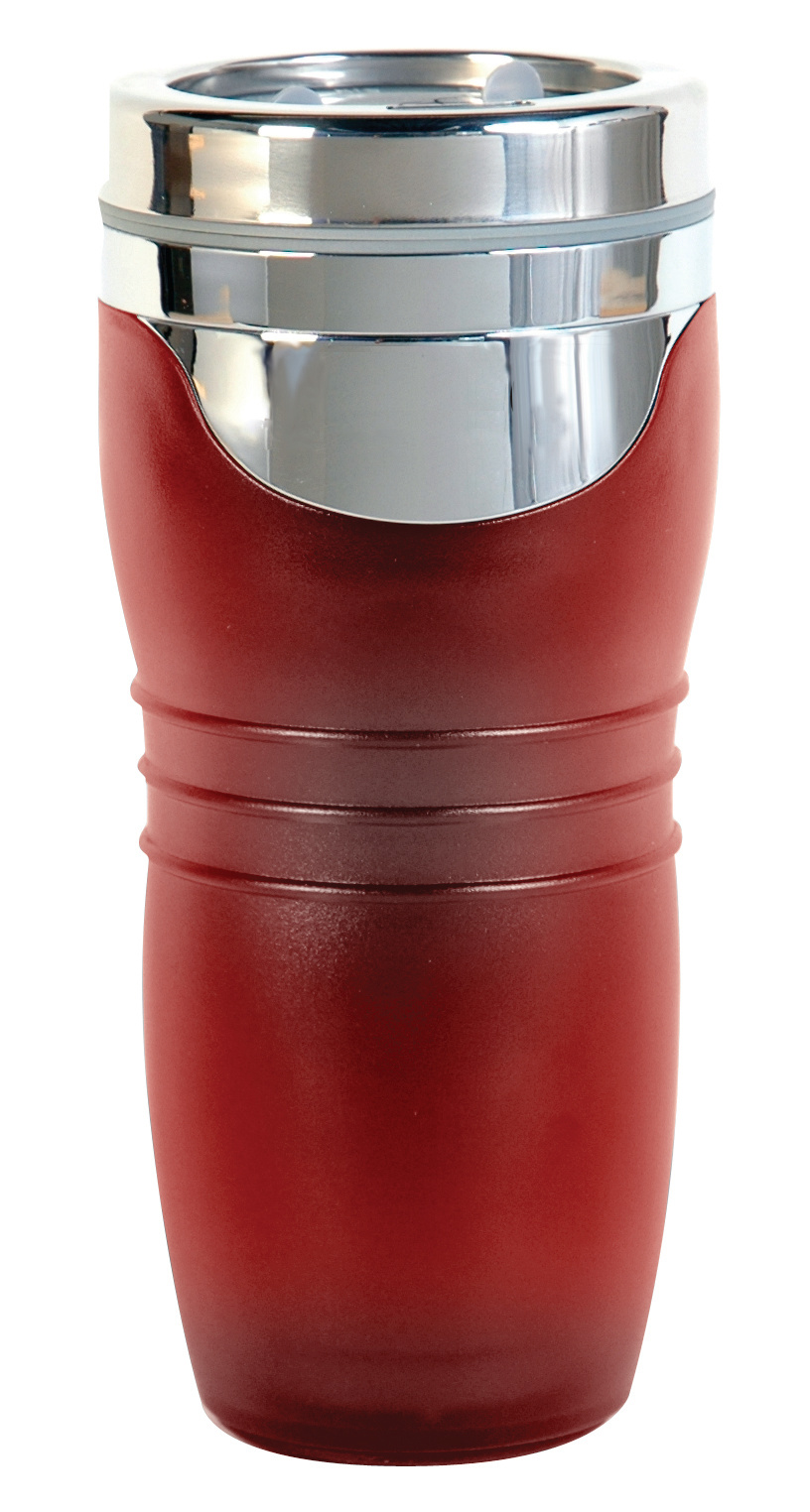
Travel mug

Travel mugs (introduced in the 1980s) generally employ thermal insulation properties for transporting hot or cold liquids. Similar to a vacuum flask, a travel mug is usually well-insulated and completely enclosed to prevent spillage or leaking, but will generally have an opening in the cover through which the contents can be consumed during transportation without spillage. As the primary mechanism by which hot (not warm) beverages lose heat is evaporation, a lid serves a vital role in keeping the drink hot; even a thin plastic one which conducts heat quite quickly.

Mugs with inner and outer walls, but not vacuum treated, are generally called double wall mugs. Usually stainless steel will be used for the inner wall while outer wall can be stainless steel, plastic, or even embedded with other materials.

Travel mug

Mugs designed for use when driving are called auto mugs or commuter mugs. Travel mugs have a spill-proof lid with a sipping opening and in many cases, a narrower base, so that they will fit into the cup-holders that are built into many vehicles. Additional criteria for evaluating auto mugs include: they must be easy to open single-handedly (to prevent distractions while driving), include a fill line (to prevent over-filling, which contributes to leaking), preferably have no handles (no-handled mugs are easier to grab while driving), should not obstruct a driver's view of the road when he or she is drinking, and - with regard to cup-holders be able to fit, stably, into a wide range of mug holders.

=== Beer stein ===
Beer steins are traditional beer mugs made out of stoneware clay and commonly associated with Germany. English use of the word dates to 1855, when it was borrowed from the German word Stein. The word Stien is not used alone to refer to a beverage container in Germany, instead Krug, Humpen, or Seidel are typically used.

Modern steins typically come in sizes of a liter or half-liter, and are often made with hinged metal lids. Many feature elaborate decorations such as coats of arms or German imagery.

=== Tiki mugs ===
Tiki mugs originated in mid-20th century tropical themed restaurants and tiki bars. The term "tiki mug" is a generic, blanket term for sculptural drink ware that depict imagery from Melanesia, Micronesia, or Polynesia, and more recently anything tropical or related to surfing. Usually sold as souvenirs, tiki mugs are often considered collectable.

=== Amusement mugs ===
The whistle mug or hubblebubble is an amusement mug. It has a hollow handle which can be blown through the mug like a whistle. With an empty mug, only one note is emitted, whereas a filled mug produces melodious trills and warbling sounds.

=== Surprise mugs ===
A surprise mug is a mug designed for use as a practical joke. After the user has drunk the beverage within, a small ceramic creature, often a frog, is revealed. These were first created around 1775 and remained popular until the end of the 19th century. Some traditions held that the shock of seeing a frog or toad in one's beer would cure cases of fever.

=== Puzzle mugs ===
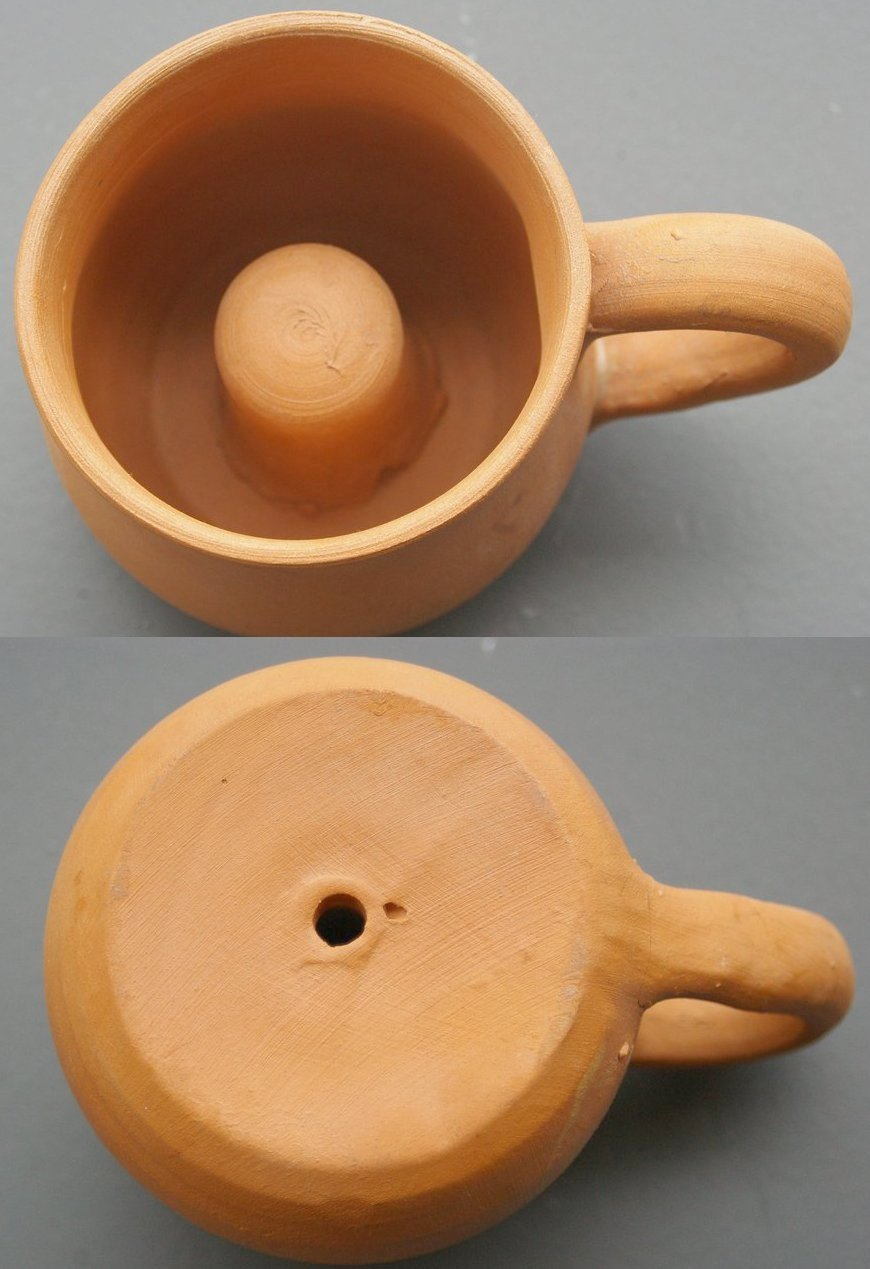
A Pythagorean cup

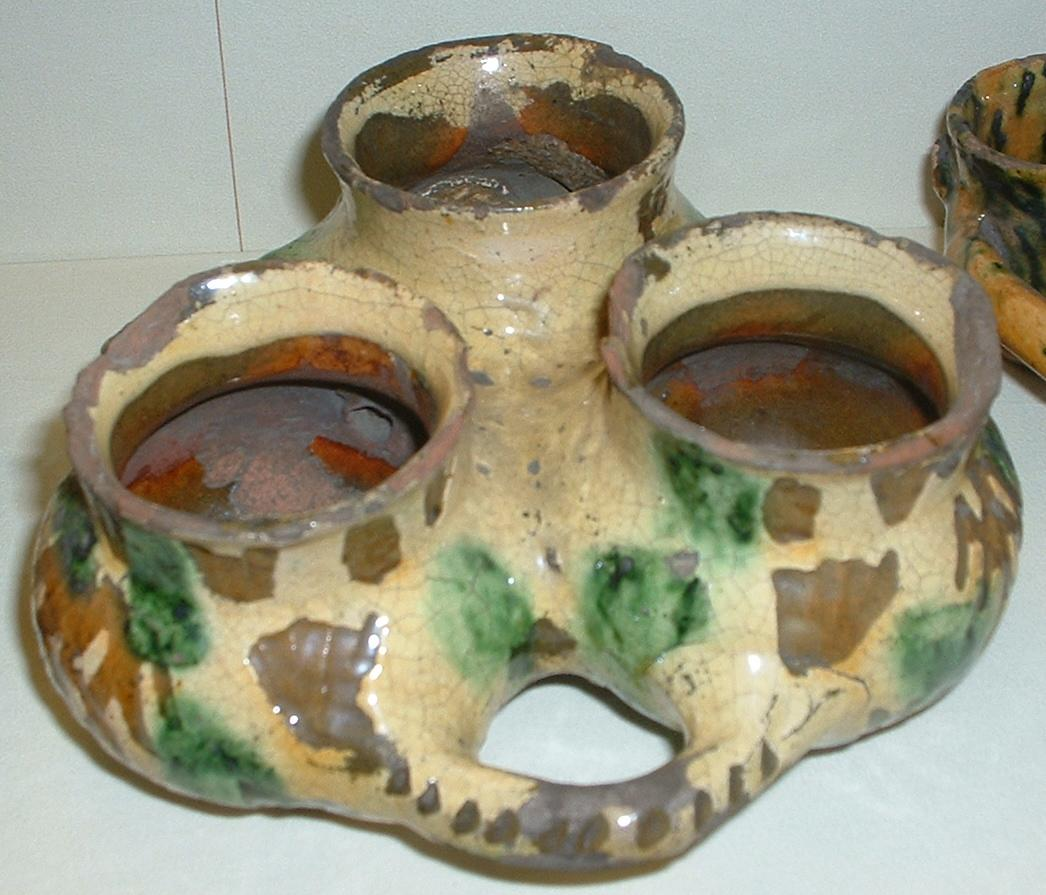
Fuddling cups. The cups have hollow interconnections that allow the contents to be drunk without spilling.

A puzzle mug is a mug which has some trick preventing normal operation. One example is a mug with multiple holes in the rim, making it impossible to drink from it in the normal way. Although it is tempting to grasp the body of the mug covering the visible holes and drink the liquid in the usual manner, this would pour the liquid through hidden perforations near the mug's top. The solution is to cover the holes in the rim with hands, but to drink not through the top, but through a "secret" hole in the hollow handle.

A puzzle mug called fuddling cups consists of three mugs connected through their walls and handles. The inner holes in the mugs' walls are designed in such a way that the mugs must be emptied in a unique sequence, or they will drain.

The Pythagorean cup (see picture) contains a small siphon hidden in a rod placed in the mug center. The cup holds liquid if filled below the height of the rod, but once filled above that level, it drains all liquid through the siphon to a hole in its base.

=== Heat changing mugs ===
Video of hot water being poured into a "magic mug" and the subsequent colour change

Heat changing, heat sensitive, or magic mugs make use of thermochromism to change appearance when a hot beverage is poured into them.

== Decoration ==
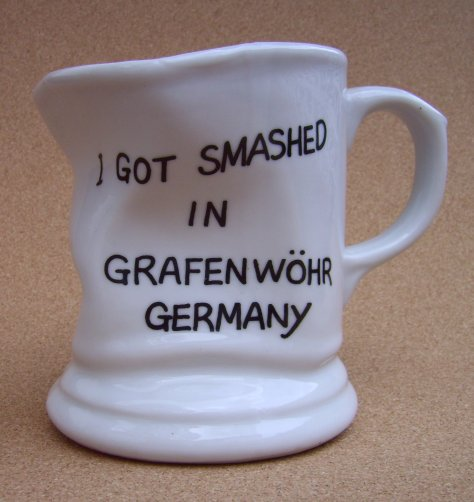
Smashed mug

As a ubiquitous desktop item, the mug is often used as an object of art or advertisement; some mugs are rather decorations than drinking vessels. Carving had been traditionally applied to mugs in the ancient times. Deforming a mug into an unusual shape is sometimes used. However, the most popular decoration technique nowadays is printing on mugs, which is usually performed as follows: Ceramic powder is mixed with dyes of chosen color and a plasticizer. Then it is printed on a gelatin-coated paper using a traditional screen-printing technique, which applies the mixture through a fine woven mesh, which is stretched on a frame and has a mask of desired shape. This technique produces a thin homogeneous coating; however, if smoothness is not required, the ceramic mixture is painted directly with a brush. Another, more complex alternative is to coat the paper with a photographic emulsion, photoprint the image and then cure the emulsion with ultraviolet light.

After drying, the printed paper, called a litho, can be stored indefinitely. When a litho is applied to the mug, it is first softened in warm water. This detaches the gelatin cover, with the printed image, from the paper; this cover is then transferred to the mug. The mug is then fired around 700–750 °C (1,290–1,380 °F; 970–1,020 K), which softens the top surface of the glaze, thereby embedding the image into it.

== Storage ==
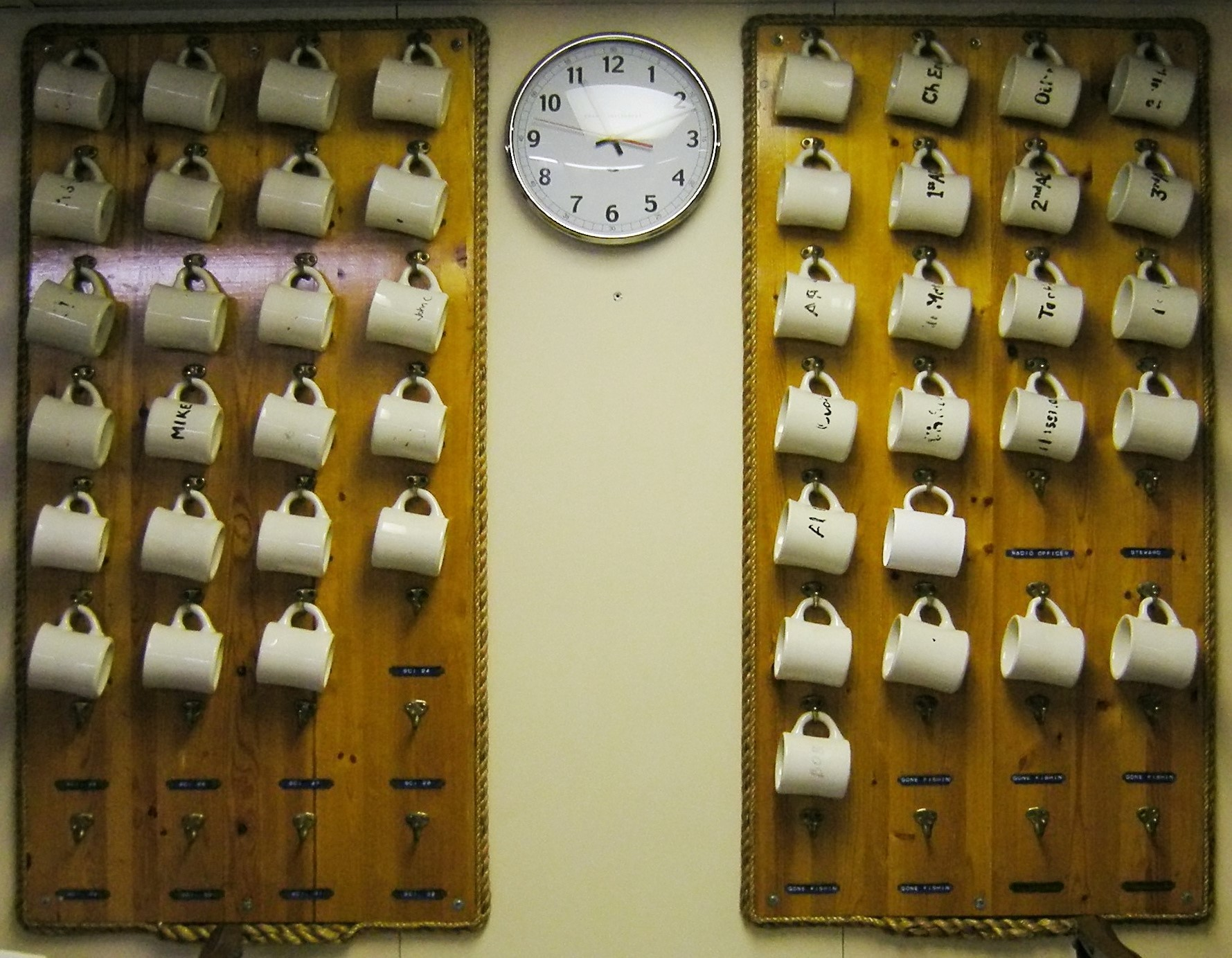
Victor-style mugs hanging on pegs in a ship's mess

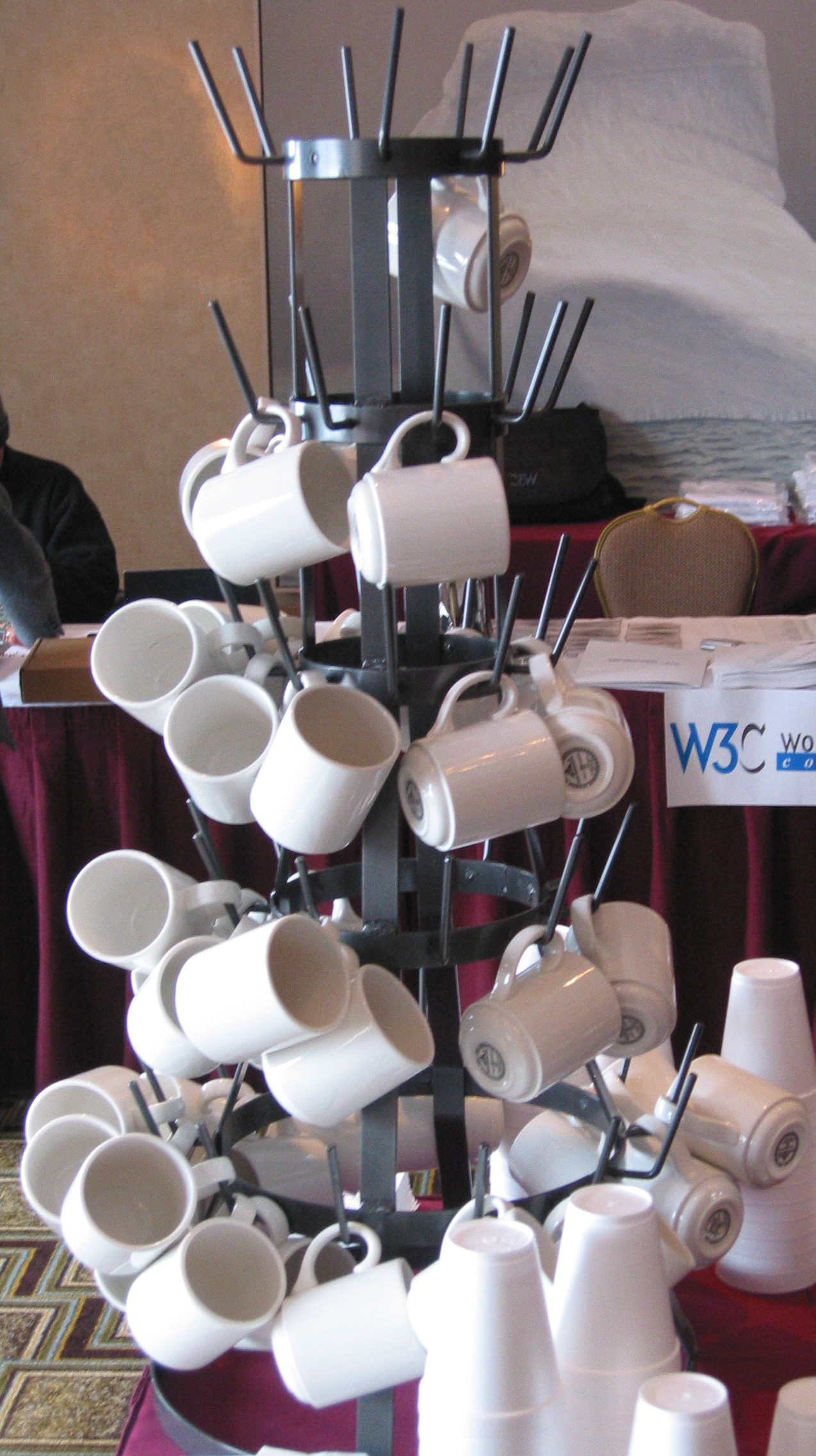
Mug tree

A popular way to store mugs is on a 'mug tree', a wooden or metal pole mounted on a round base and fitted with pegs to hang mugs by their handles. There are also racks designed for hanging mugs so that they are ready to hand. Those are especially useful on ships in high waves. Mugs can often be a collectible item, making storage and display tools/strategies something important to think about for collectors.

== In mathematics ==
A continuous deformation between a coffee mug and a donut illustrating that they are homeomorphic (topologically equivalent)

The mug serves as one of the most popular examples of homeomorphism in topology. Two objects are homeomorphic if one can be deformed into the other without cutting or gluing. Thus in topology, a mug is equivalent (homeomorphic) to a doughnut (torus) as it can be reshaped into a doughnut by a continuous deformation, without cutting, breaking, punching holes or gluing. Another topological example is a mug with two handles, which is equivalent to a double torus – an object resembling number 8. A mug without a handle, i.e., a bowl or a beaker, is topologically equivalent to a saucer, which is quite evident when a raw clay bowl is flattened on a potter's wheel.

== Non-beverage mugs ==
=== Shaving mugs and scuttles ===
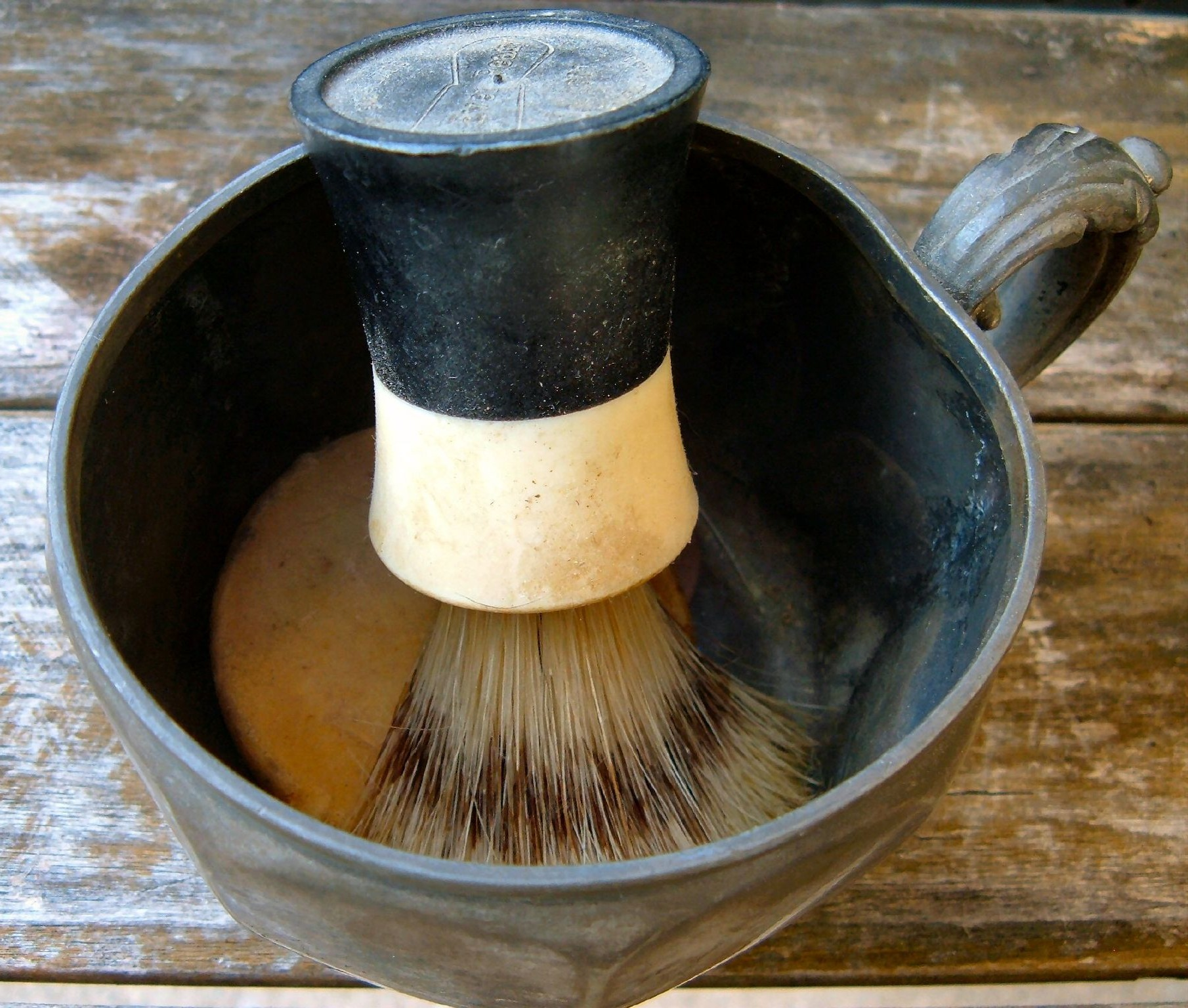
Shaving mug

A shaving scuttle and shaving mug were developed around the 19th century; the first patent for a shaving mug is dated 1867. As hot water was not common in many households, one way to provide hot lather was to use a scuttle or mug. A traditional scuttle resembles a teapot with a wide spout where hot water is poured in; this is where it differs from a shaving mug, which has no spout. Both shaving scuttles and mugs usually have a handle, but some have none. Shaving mugs often look like a standard mug, however, some also have a built in brush rest, so the brush does not sit in lather. Modern versions of the scuttle are in limited production, usually by independent potters working in small volumes.

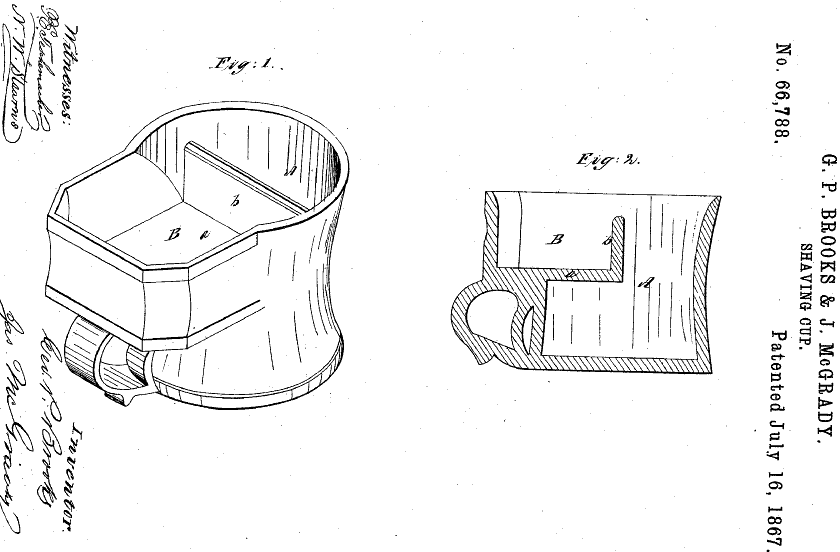
Shaving scuttle, 1867 patent.

At the top of the scuttle or mug is a soap holder. Traditionally, it was used with a hard block of shaving soap (rather than soft soap or cream) and therefore had drain holes at the bottom. Later scuttles and mugs do not include the holes, and thus can be used with creams and soft soaps. Some scuttles and mugs have concentric circles on the bottom, which retain some water thus helping to build lather.

In use, the shaving brush is dunked into the wide spout, allowing it to soak into the water and heat up. The soap is placed in the soap holder. When needed, one can take the brush and brush it against the soap, bringing up a layer of lather; excess water is drained back. This allows conservation of water and soap, whilst retaining enough heat to ensure a long shave.

== Gallery ==
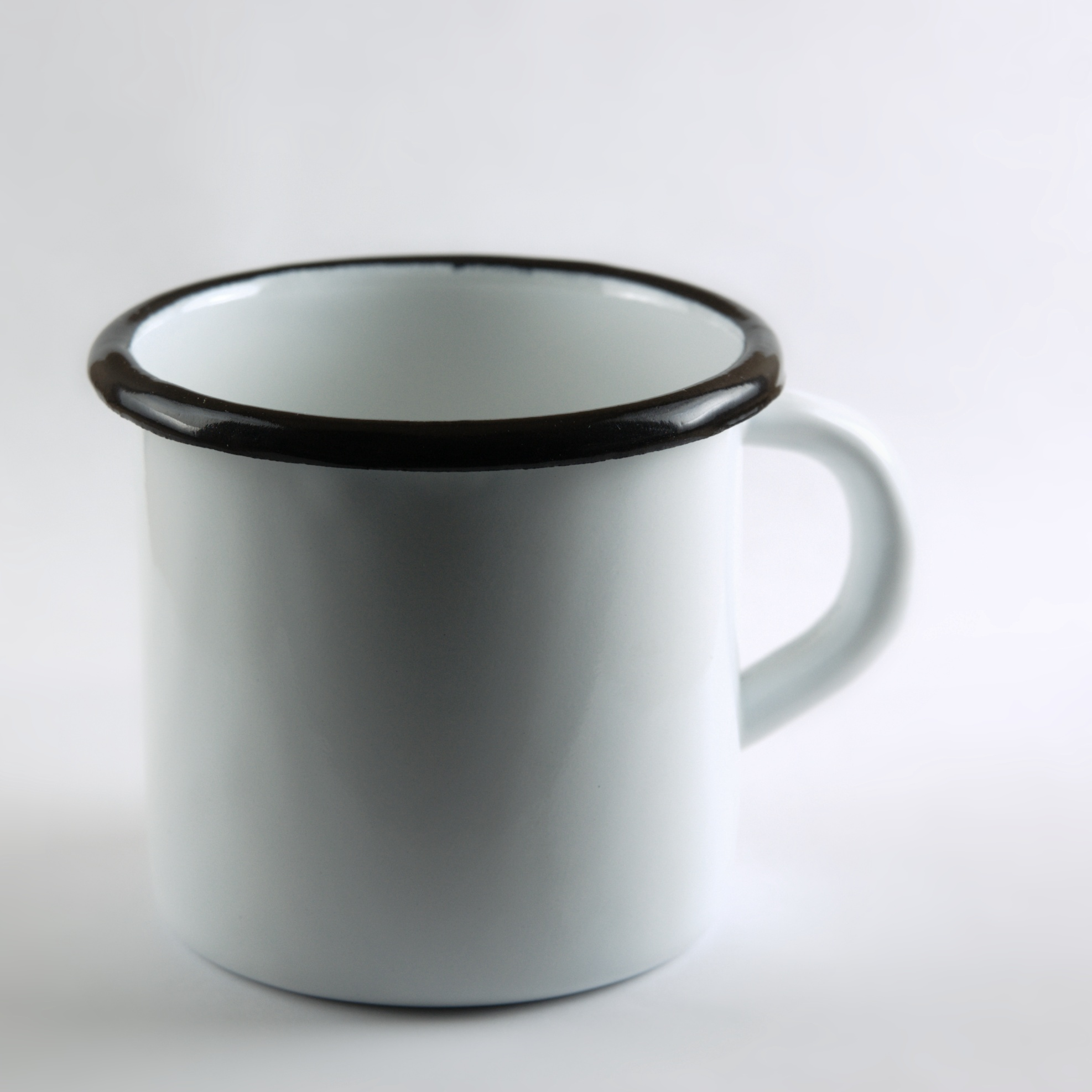
Enamel mug

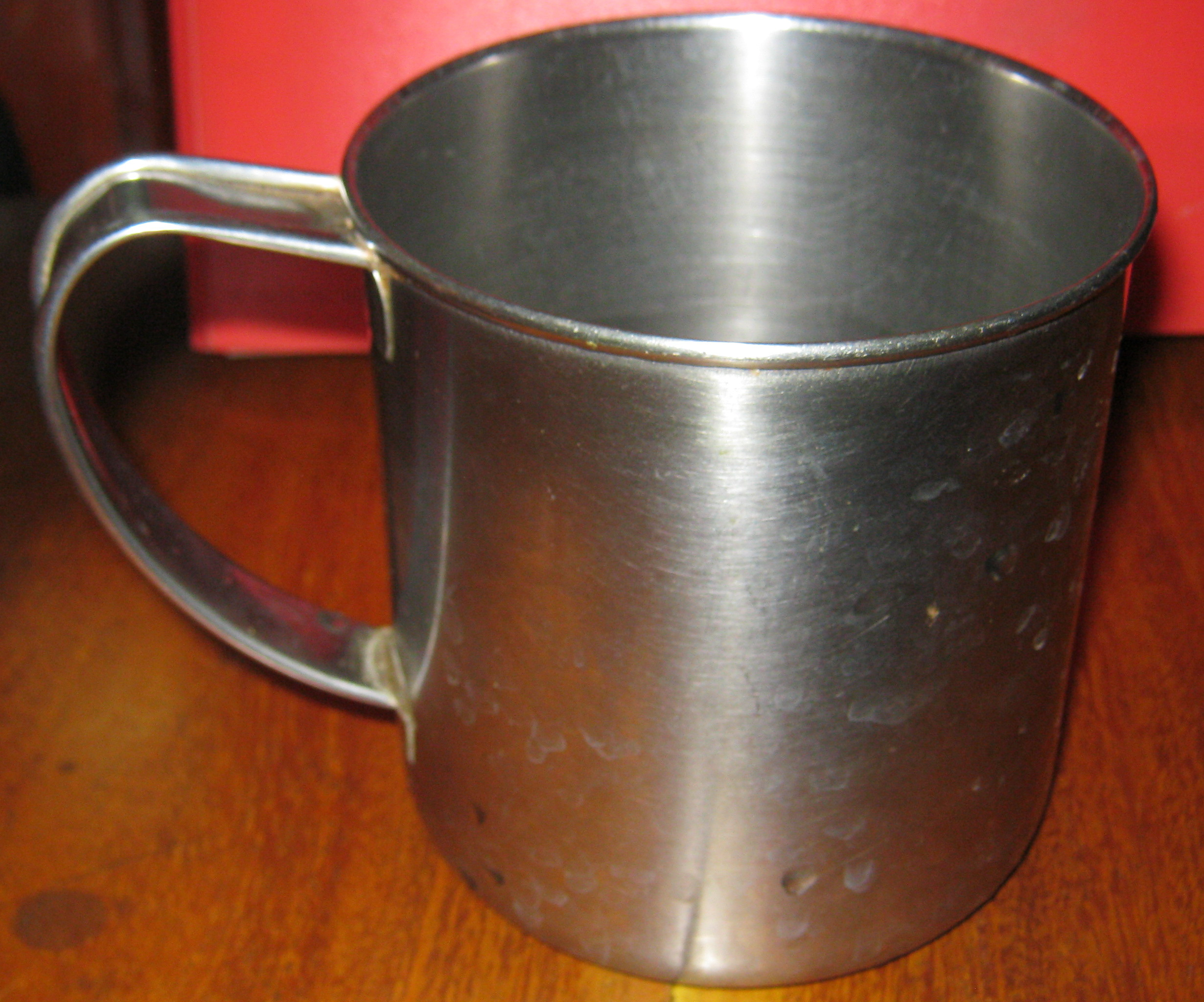
Steel mug

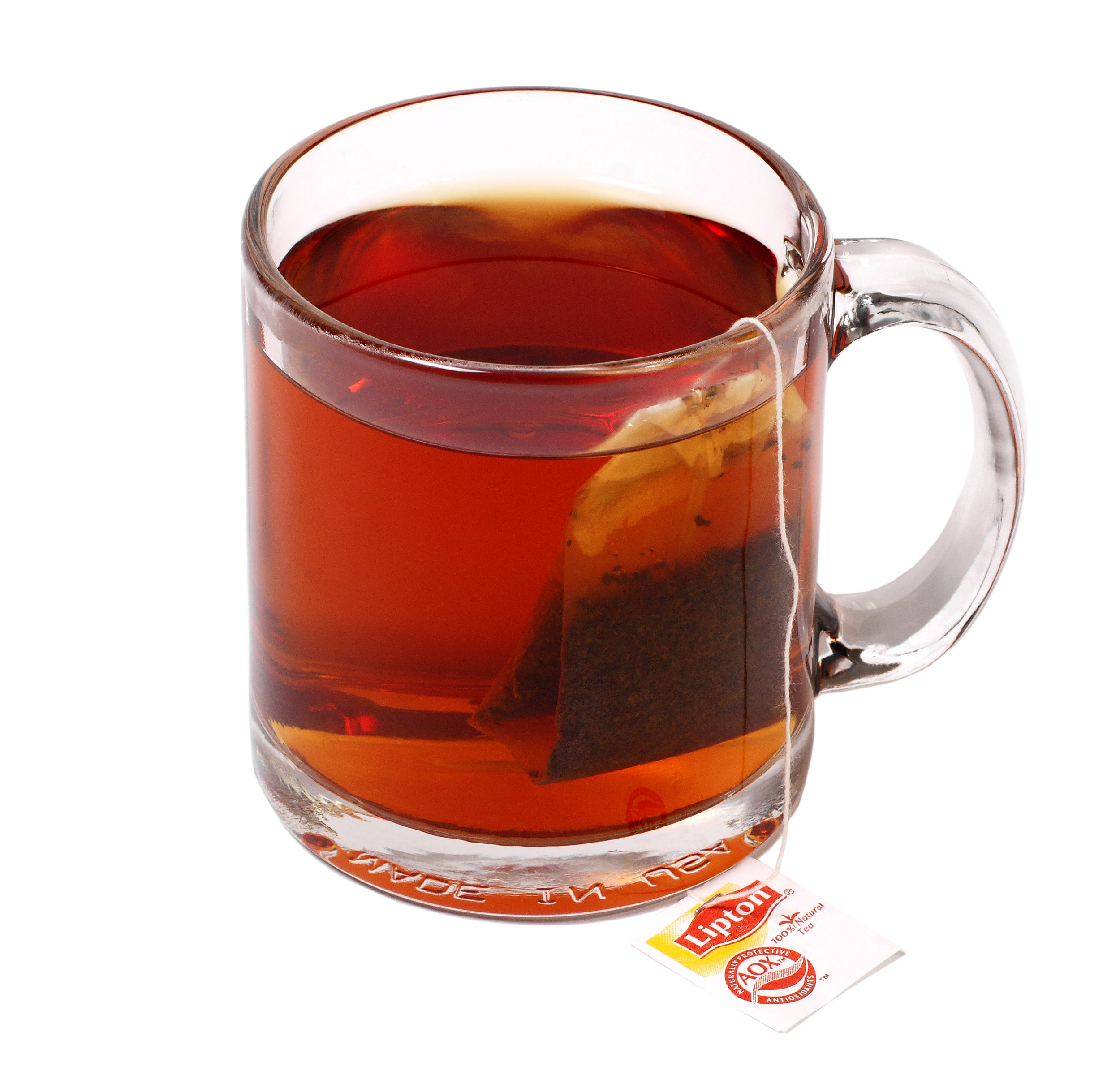
Glass mug of tea

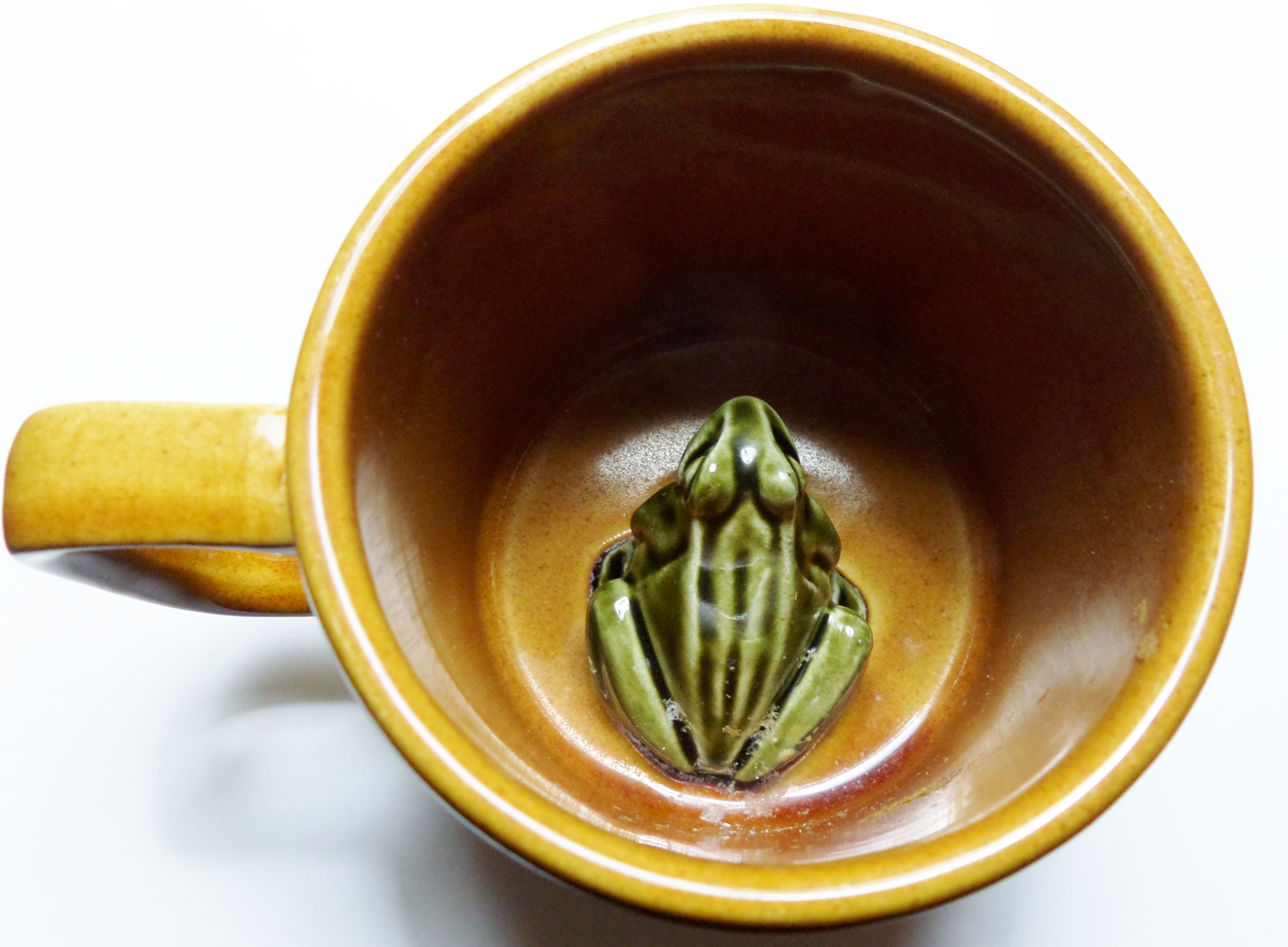
Frog mug, Toad or Surprise mug

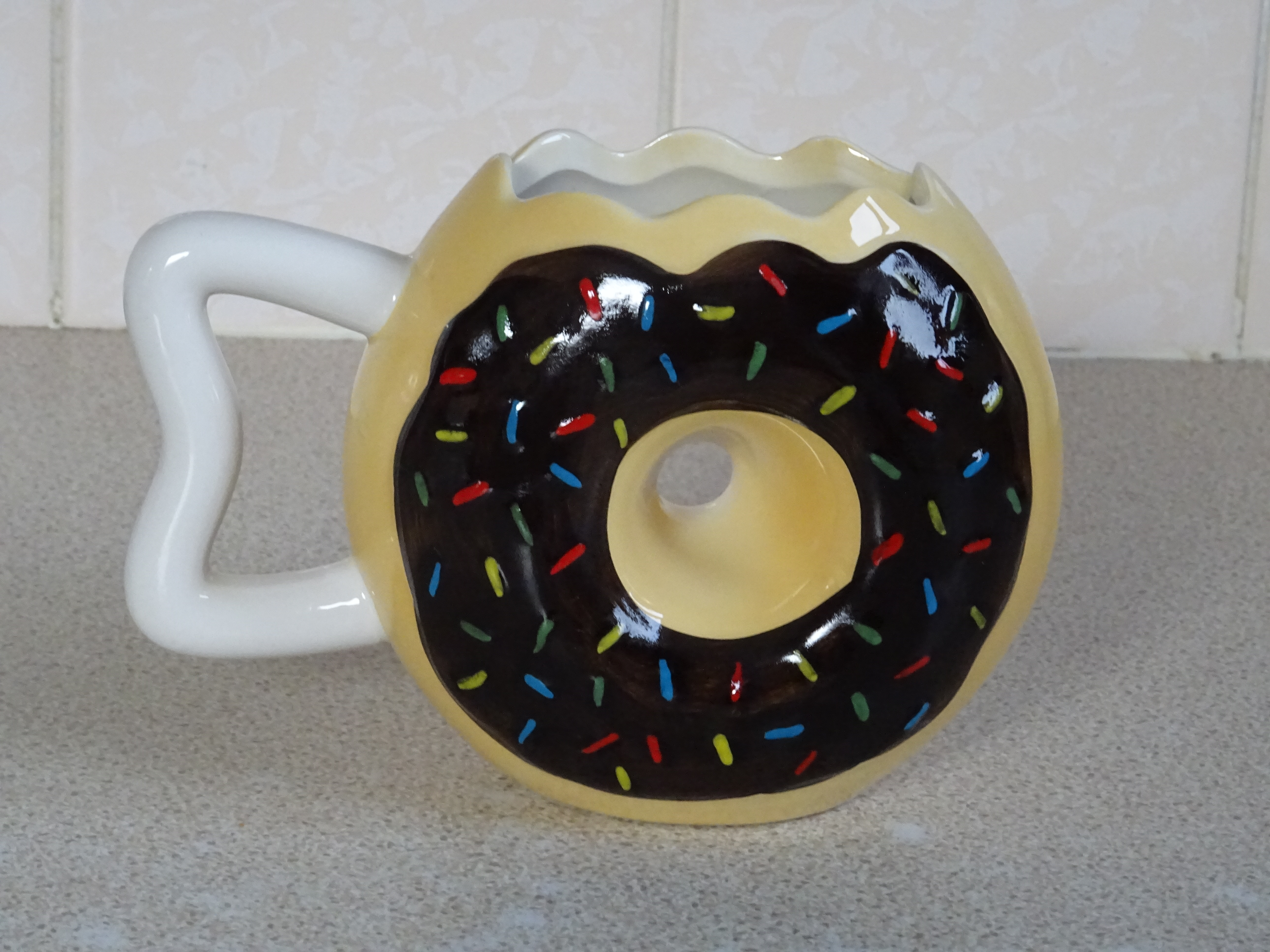
Doughnut-shaped mug

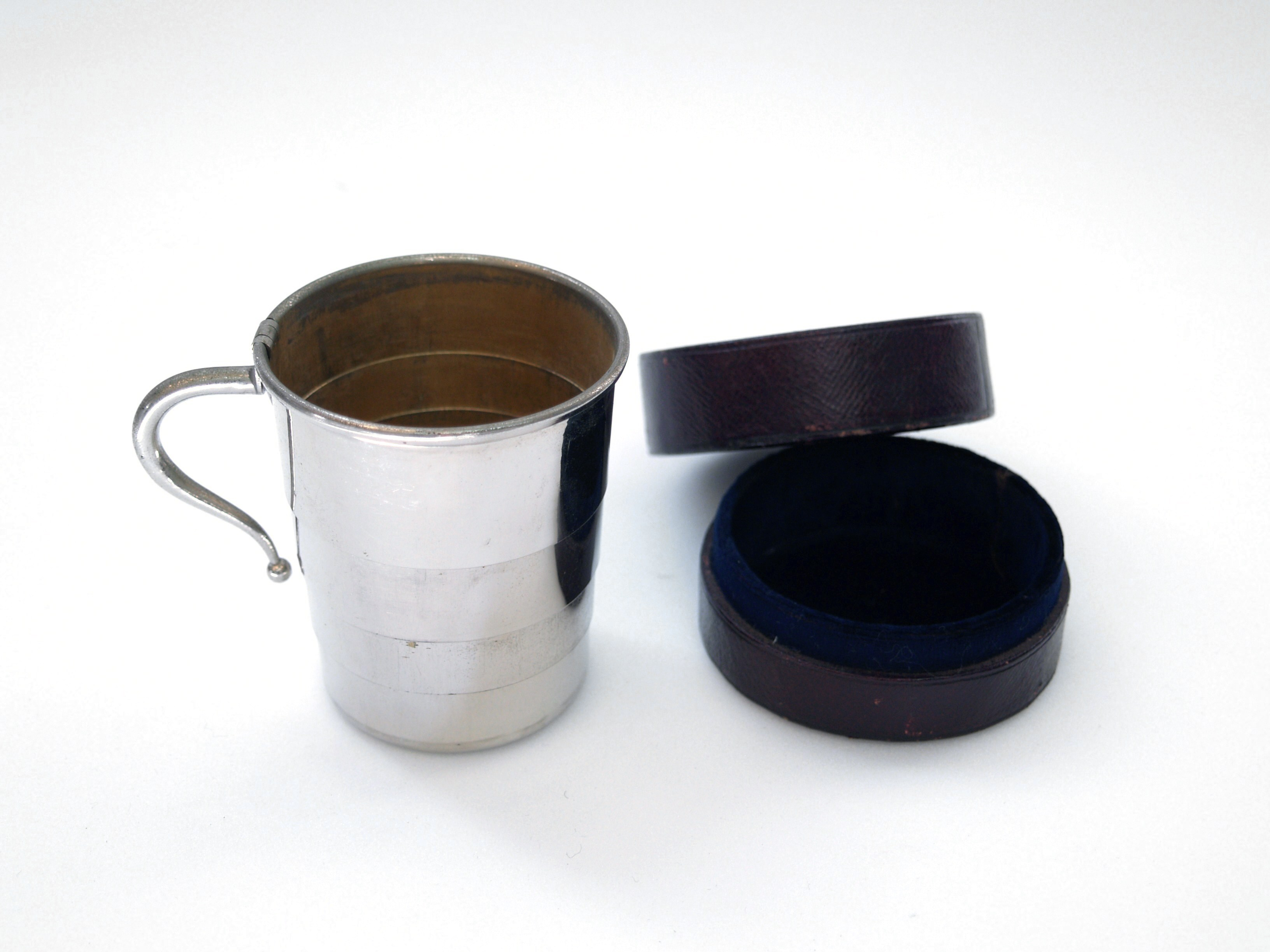
Collapsible metal travellers mug with case

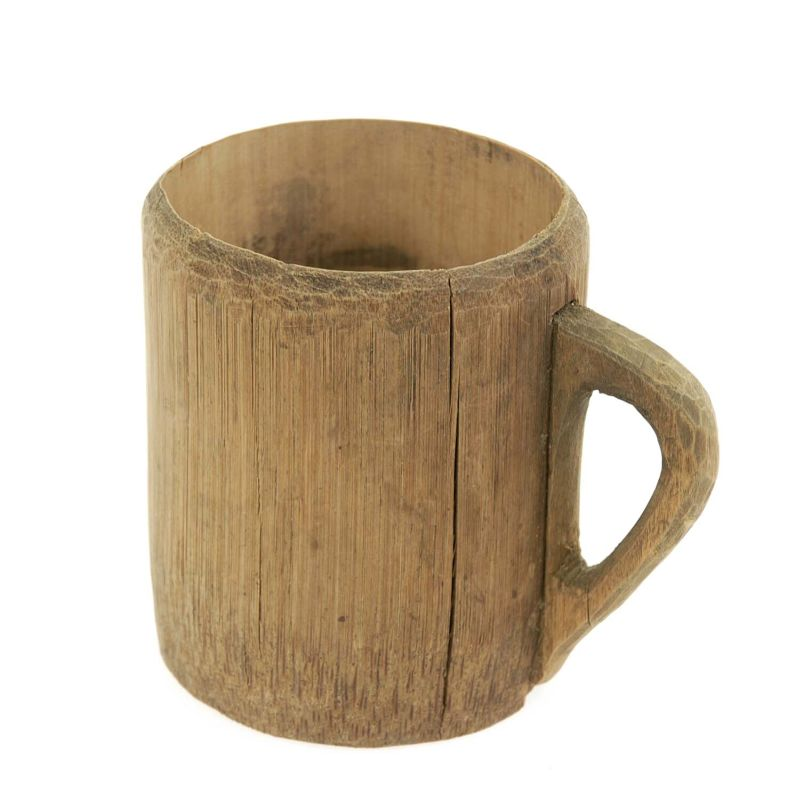
Wooden mug

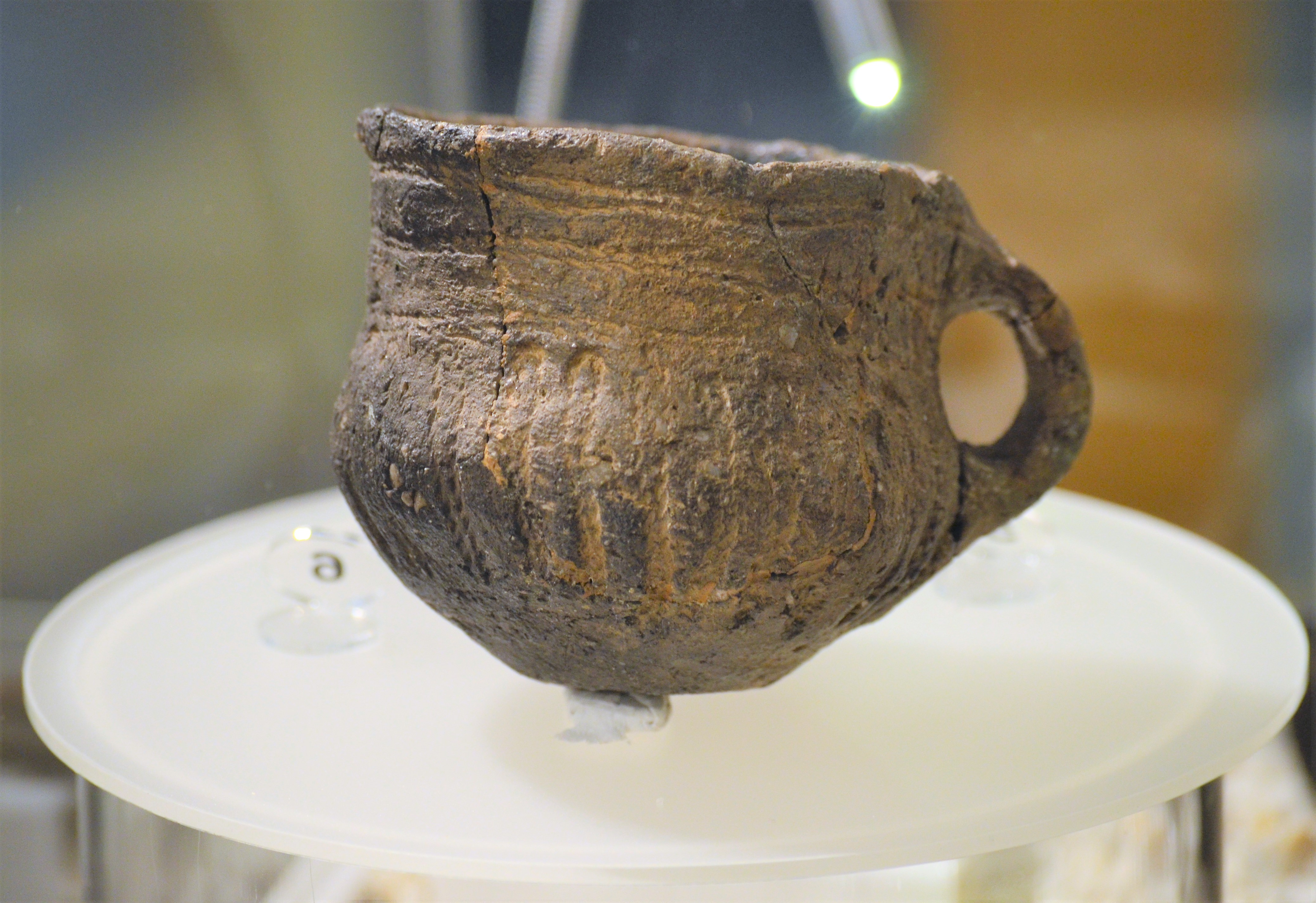
Bronze-age clay mug of the Mierzanowice culture, from Dzierżno, Poland

== See also ==
- Beer glassware
- Moustache cup, a vessel with a modification to facilitate easier drinking of hot beverages
- Pythagorean cup
- Tumbler (glass)
- Mug shot, informal term for a police photograph

== Sources ==
- Kronenfeld, D. (1996). Plastic Glasses and Church Fathers: Semantic Extension From the Ethnoscience Tradition. Oxford Studies in Anthropological Linguistics. Oxford University Press. ISBN 978-0-19-535749-3.
- Wierzbicka, Anna (1984). "Cups and mugs: Lexicography and conceptual analysis". Australian Journal of Linguistics. 4 (2). Informa UK Limited: 205–255. doi:10.1080/07268608408599326. ISSN 0726-8602.
