= Friendship cup =

A Coppa dell’amicizia or friendship cup is a traditional Lombardic wooden cup originating from the mountainous Valle d'Aosta region of Italy and used for drinking specially prepared coffee drinks in the good company of friends. This version of a friendship cup is transformed into an artistic object to decorate a household or is used as a gift for an acquaintance.

== See also ==
- Noggin (cup)
- Fuddling cup
- Plastic cup
- Pythagorean cup
- Coffee cup
- Skull cup
