= Frog mug =

Type of ceramic cup

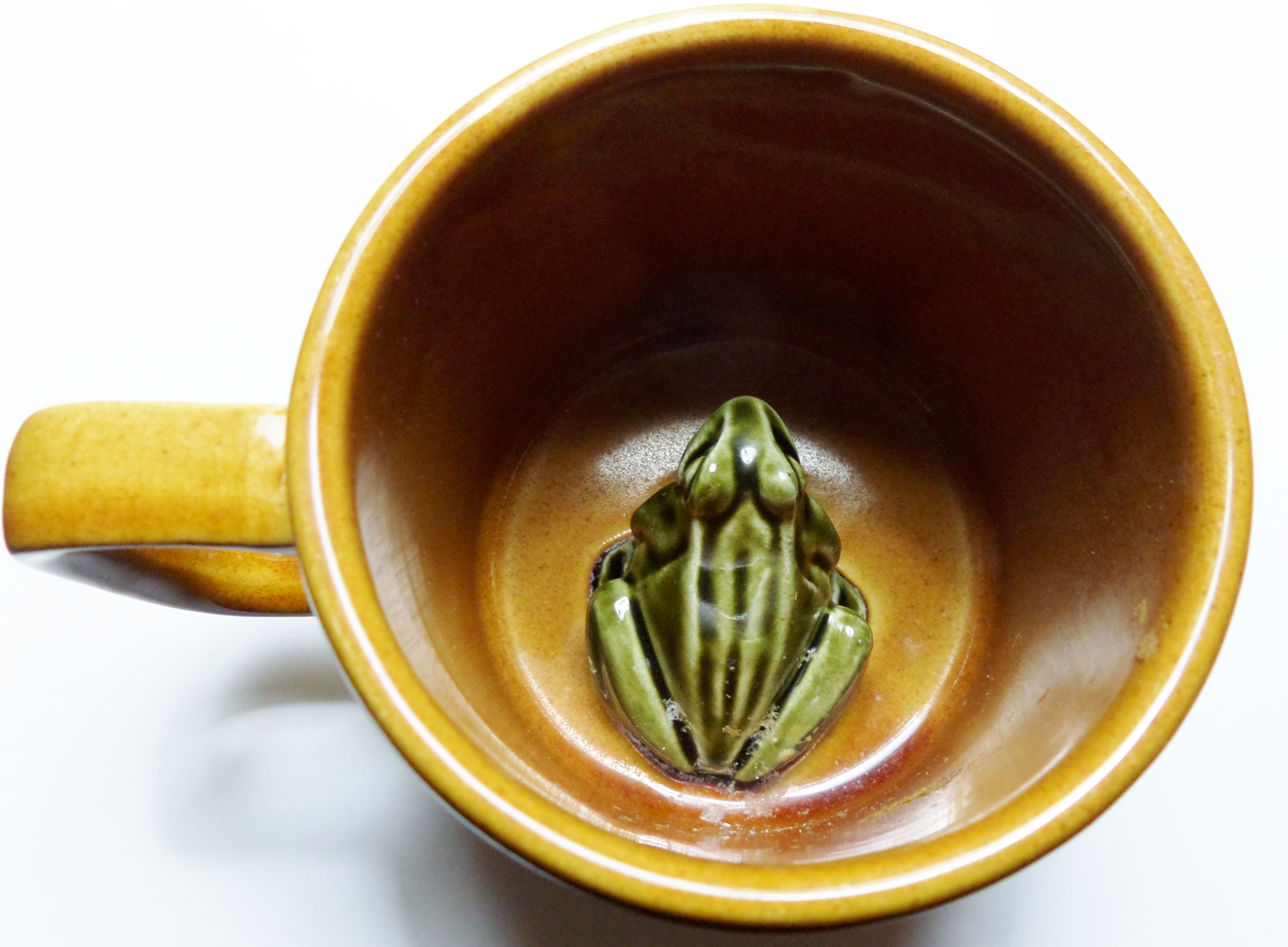
A modern frog mug

A frog mug (also known as a toad mug, surprise mug or ague mug) is a type of ceramic cup mainly used for drinking beer or similar alcoholic beverages. They were first produced in Sunderland before being copied in such places as Staffordshire, Worcestershire and Newcastle. These mugs were part of the tradition of drinking games such as fuddling cups and puzzle jugs. In this case the cups featured one or more painted or three-dimensional ceramic frogs or toads that slowly emerged at the bottom of the vessel as it was drained.

== Characteristics ==
These practical joke mugs containing frogs or toads date from circa 1775 and continued to be popular until the end of the 19th century. An unsuspecting drinker would be surprised as he quaffed his beer to see a frog or toad emerging from the typically cloudy beverage of those days as it was fully consumed and the amphibian came into view, with predictable results. In some cases the creature would gurgle and spit at the drinker through a hole in its mouth as the vessel was tilted and the dregs consumed. Some larger examples had two or three handles and might contain several frogs/toads. Naval references are common on these mugs due to their common use in taverns frequented by sailors.

=== Decoration ===
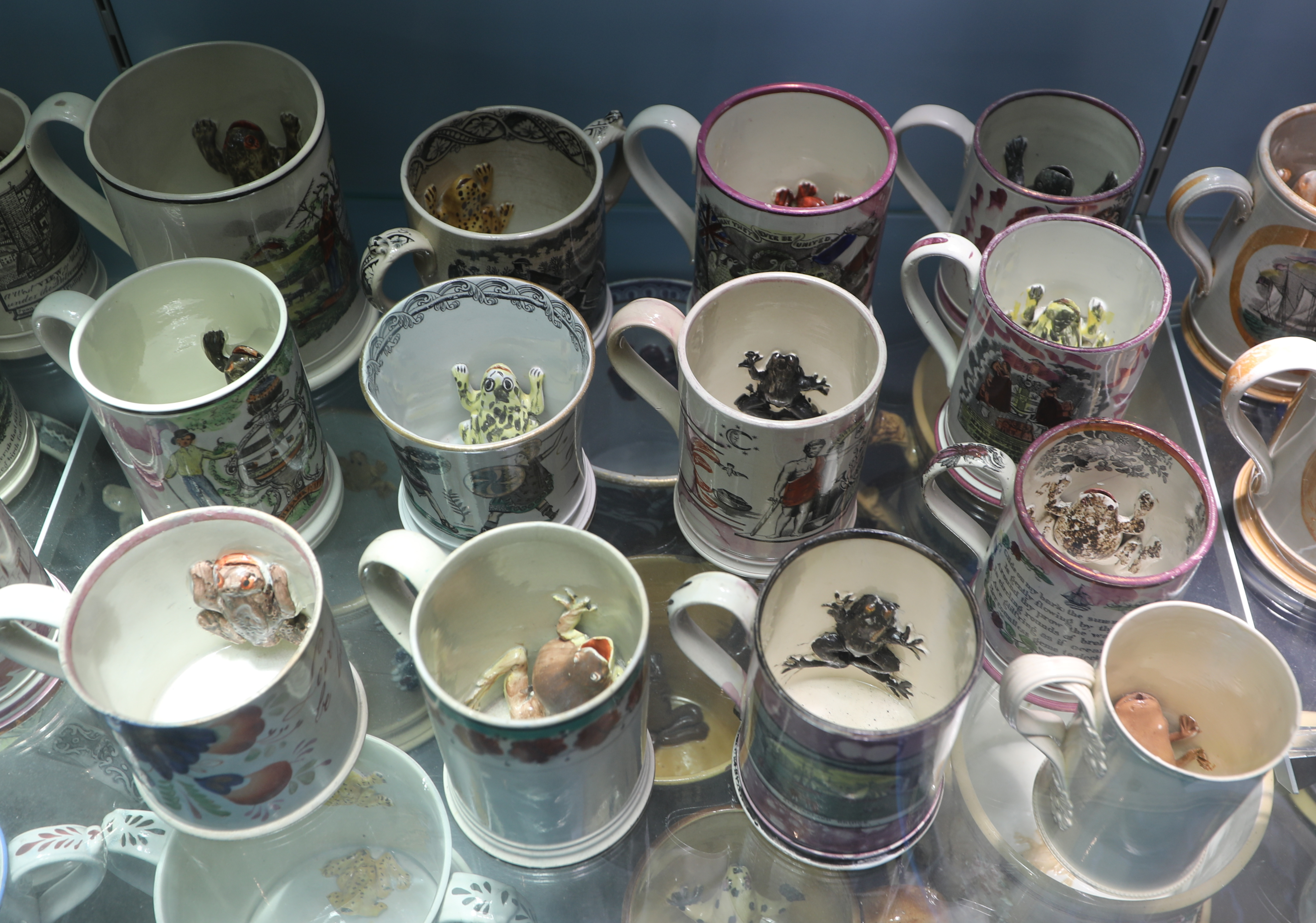
Frog mugs at the Potteries Museum & Art Gallery

Transfer-printed designs are often found on these mugs with patriotic sentiments, mottoes, proverbs, sayings, educational verses, pictorial images, etc. and some are inscribed with the names of individuals, suggesting that were sometimes given as a gift to mark a special occasion. A number were produced to commemorate the Crimean war success or Napoleon Bonaparte's defeat. Some mugs have raised designs featuring a wide range of subjects.

Naval references are common on these mugs due to their common use in taverns frequented by sailors. This has led to the suggestions that in some instances anti-French sentiments were responsible for during the Trafalgar period sailors frequently referred to the French as 'Monsieur Johnny Crapaud' where 'Crapaud' in French means a toad.

The verses below amply illustrate these attitudes:-

"May England's oak,
Produce the bark,
To tan the hide,
Of Bonaparte.

The mugs were sometimes smashed by the surprised victim of the prank and as a precaution an inscription on the mug warned against this:-

"Tho' malt and venom,
Seem united,
Don't break my pot,
Nor be affrighted.

== Uses ==
These mugs were a sort of rustic joke that added to the atmosphere and jollity in taverns, etc. In modern times they serve as simple amusement or conversation pieces.

Ague is an illness involving fever and shivering. It was an old tradition that a sudden shock, such as the surprise of seeing a frog or toad in your beer would deliver a cure.

Some of these mugs were made with the intention of encouraging young children to finish their drink by exposing the frog or toad.

== Manufacturers ==
They were first made in Sunderland around 1775 before being copied in such places as Staffordshire, Worcestershire and Newcastle. In the 1860s there were around twenty-five potteries producing these mugs on the Tees, Tyne and Wear. They are sometimes known as Sunderland mugs because of their first place of manufacture.
