= Magic mug =

Drinking cup that changes colour

Video of hot water being poured into a "magic mug" and the subsequent colour change

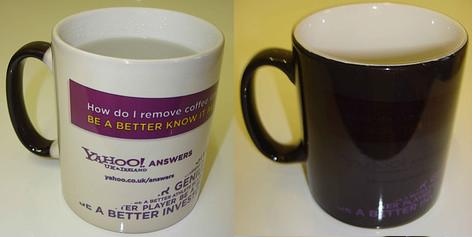
A promotional magic mug filled with a hot liquid (left) and empty (right)

A magic mug, also known as a heat changing mug, transforming mug, or disappearing mug is a mug that changes color when it is filled with a hot liquid. This effect is created by using thermochromic ink.

Magic mugs are often manufactured and sold as memorabilia. For example, a mug may reveal a picture of the town or monument where it was sold, for example the Haunted Mansion/Grim Grinning Ghost Disney cup. They are sometimes given away to promote organizations. Customers can also have their own photographs printed on the mugs.

== See also ==
- Noggin (cup)
- Fuddling cup
- Plastic cup
- Coffee cup
