= Cupps =

Cupps is a surname. Notable people with the surname include:

- Christopher Cupps (born 2008), American soccer player
- Gabe Cupps (born 2004), American basketball player
- Scott Cupps (fl. 2019-present), American politician

== See also ==
- Cupp (surname)
