= The Cup =

The Cup may refer to:

- The Cup (1999 film), (also Phörpa) Tibetan-language comedy film about Tibetan monks and the 1998 World Cup Final
- The Cup (2011 film), biographical film about jockey Damien Oliver and the 2002 Melbourne Cup
- The Cup (book), 2009 non-fiction book about the 2002 Melbourne Cup
- The Cup (TV series), a 2008 British television mockumentary about a junior association football team
- "The Cup", a single by American rapper Dave Blunts

== See also ==
- Cup (disambiguation)
