= Dribble glass =

Practical joke drinking glass

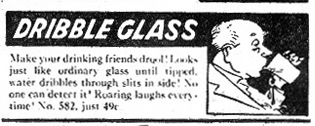
An advert for a dribble glass from a 1948 comic book: "Make your drinking friends drool!"

A dribble glass is a drinking glass that has holes hidden in its etched design.

The purpose of a dribble glass is for pranks. When a person tilts the glass to take a drink from this glass, they will end up spilling the liquid on their clothing as the drink trickles through the holes.

In ancient Greece, sculptors created so-called "dirty trick vases" that featured a small rectangular hole in the foot of the vase.

== See also ==
- Fuddling cup
- List of practical joke topics
- Puzzle jug
- Pythagorean cup
