= Cupp (surname) =

Cupp is a surname. Notable people with the name include:

- Baylor Cupp (born 2000), American football player
- Bob Cupp (1939–2016), American golf course designer
- Cordelia Cupp, a fictional consulting detective portrayed by Uzo Aduba in the 2025 mystery series The Residence
- James N. Cupp (1921–2004), United States Marine Corps aviator
- Keith Cupp (born 1964), American football player
- Pat Cupp (born 1938), American rockabilly guitarist
- Robert R. Cupp (born 1950), American politician; Speaker of the Ohio House of Representatives
- Ruth Williams Cupp (1928–2016); American lawyer, legislator, judge, and author
- S. E. Cupp (born 1979), American television host, political commentator, and writer

== See also ==
- Kupp, surname
- Cupps, surname
