= Kup =

Kup may refer to:

- Kup, Hungary
- Kup, Poland
- Kup, a village in Sangrur district in Punjab, India; site of the 1762 Battle of Kup between the Afghans and Sikhs
- Küp, in Turkey
- Kup (military rank), a military rank in North Korea
- Kup (cuneiform), a sign in cuneiform writing
- Kup, alternative transliteration of geup, a Korean term for a martial art rank
- Sports cup in Croatian names of various Croatian Cups
- Irv Kupcinet's nickname
- Potassium Uptake Permease (KUP) family, family of integral membrane transport proteins

== See also ==
- Kupp, surname
- Kups (disambiguation)
