= Kups (disambiguation) =

Kups may refer to:

- Kuopion Palloseura (KuPS), a Finnish football club
- Küps, a municipality in Bavaria, Germany
- KUPS, a radio station in Washington State, United States

== See also ==
- Kup (disambiguation)
- Cups (disambiguation)
