= Cupp =

Cupp may refer to:

- Cupp (surname), includes a list of people with the name
- Centre for Underground Physics in Pyhäsalmi (CUPP), an underground physics laboratory located in Pyhäjärvi, Finland
- Patrick D. Cupp Stadium (also Cupp Stadium), a multi-use stadium in Radford, Virginia on the campus of Radford University
- Chinese Unification Promotion Party, a minor pro-Chinese Communist Party political party in Taiwan
