= Kupp =

Kupp is a surname. Notable people with the surname include the following family of American football players:

- Jake Kupp (born 1941), offensive lineman
- Craig Kupp (born 1967), Jake's son; quarterback
- Cooper Kupp (born 1993), Craig's son; wide receiver

== See also ==
- Cupp (surname)
