= Ruth Cupp =

American judge and politician (1928-2016)

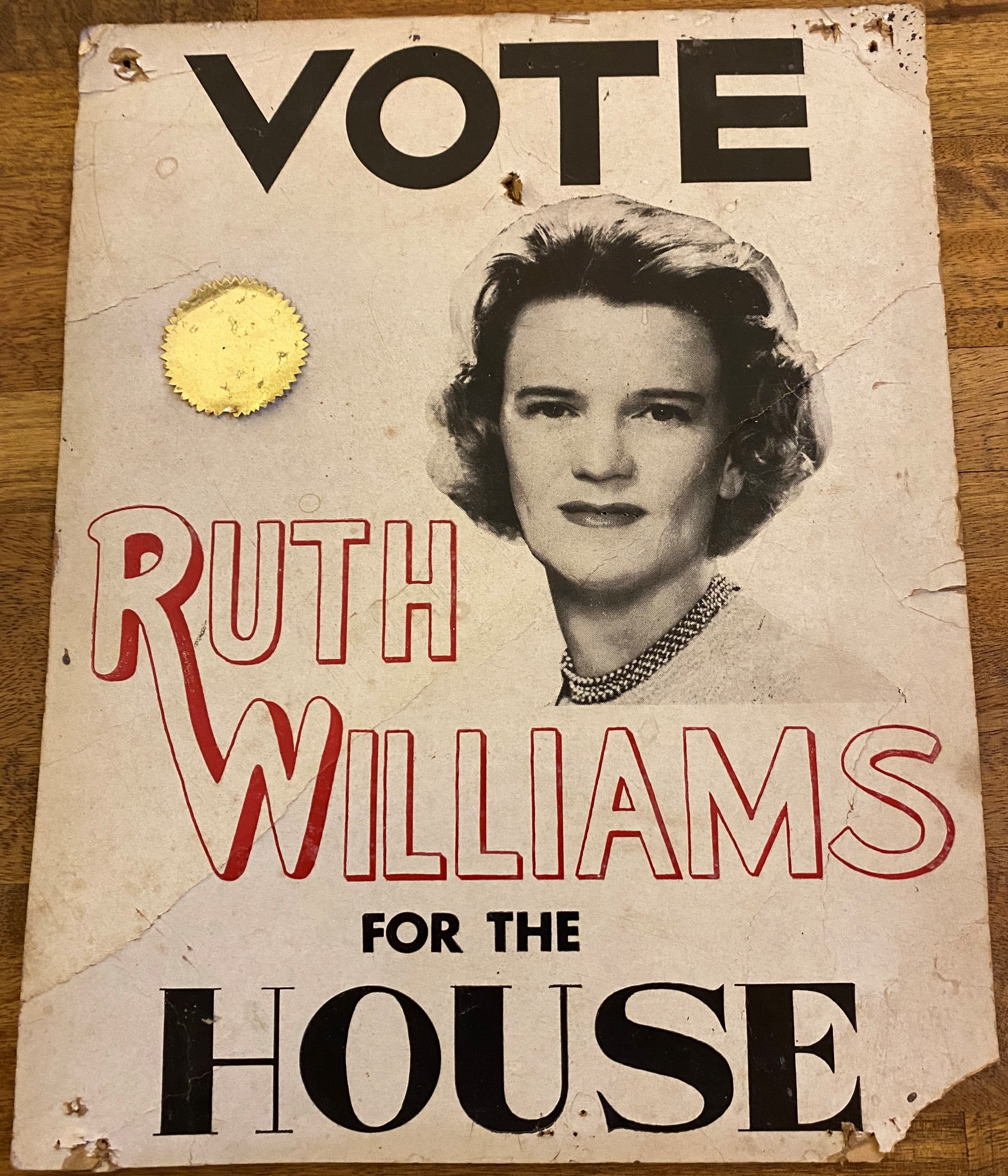
- Campaign poster for Ruth Williams

Member of the South Carolina House of Representatives
- In office 1962–1964

Personal details
- Born: Ruth Williams; December 16, 1928 Fort Worth, Texas, U.S.
- Died: July 9, 2016 (aged 87) North Charleston, South Carolina, U.S.
- Party: Democratic
- Spouse: Claude Murphy Cupp
- Education: Winthrop College; University of South Carolina Law School
- Occupation: Judge, lawyer, legislator, writer

Ruth Cupp (née Williams; December 16, 1928 – July 9, 2016) was an American lawyer, legislator, judge, and author in South Carolina. She was the first woman admitted to the Charleston County Bar Association. She served as an associate probate judge, and was elected to the South Carolina House of Representatives, serving from 1962 to 1964.

She was also a columnist for Charleston's The Post and Courier.

== Early life ==
Williams was born in Fort Worth, Texas, on December 16, 1928, to Eva Lou and Ollie Williams. She had two sisters, Eddie Lou Garvin and Patsy Williams Hughes Mizell, and one brother, Ray Williams. In 1941, she and her family moved to North Charleston, South Carolina.

== Education ==
Williams attended Winthrop College in Rock Hill, South Carolina, where she earned a scholarship and majored in sociology and political science. During her college years, she worked at the Charleston Orphan House. She completed the constitutional law course of professor Ruth Toettinger, who inspired her to pursue graduate work in the law.

In 1954, Williams graduated from the University of South Carolina Law School. She was the lone woman in a class of 44 students. She said that the law school would admit only one female student per entering class, but also that she got along well with her male classmates.

== Law career ==
Williams was admitted to the South Carolina bar on December 14, 1954; in her book about women lawyers in South Carolina, Portia Steps up to the Bar, she indicated she was the sixty-fifth woman attorney admitted to the South Carolina bar.

Of her time entering the legal profession, she said, "I was among the relatively few women who entered the professional world during the [1950s]. At the time, I felt that I was getting some mixed signals about legitimacy as a female wage earner. Certainly there were occasions when I felt socially out of place."

After graduation from law school, Williams practiced law at Broad Street in Charleston. In 1954, she became the first of the area's female attorneys to join the Charleston County Bar Association. Her law practice spanned 61 years.

When Williams began to practice law, there were still many antiquated requirements. She wrote that from 1895 to the 1950s all South Carolina lawyers and certain officeholders, "had to swear, upon their admission to the bar, not to settle disputes by dueling." She said this requirement was eliminated after James F. Byrnes was inaugurated as Governor of South Carolina and he was teased about promising not to duel by his friends who attended the inauguration. The South Carolina Code at the time also provided that "a child under the age of ten or a totally blind person is qualified to draw the jury, whose names of individuals are encased in a capsule and placed in a drum". She stated that most "courts used a boy under the age of ten to draw their juries, although few used a blind man ... On one occasion, I nodded to the blind juryman as I took a step to join him in the courthouse elevator and strangely, he nodded back. The only South Carolina jury girl child that I have been able to identify is Pamela Hughes, now a school principal in Berkeley County." She said that at the time, all court sessions opened with a prayer.

She practiced law with the president of the Charleston Bar, Robert Figg, and then later worked for the office of Hope and Cabaniss.

== South Carolina House of Representatives ==
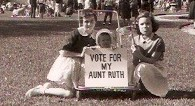
Picture of Vote for My Aunt Ruth sign

Williams served in the South Carolina House of Representatives from 1962 to 1964. She was unmarried at the time that she ran for office, and in an apparent attempt to emphasize her focus on family values, a niece of hers was photographed in a baby carriage with the campaign sign "Vote for My Aunt Ruth".

Of her time in the House of Representatives, she recalled: "I was the only woman out of 124 members. It wasn't daunting. I was there to make sure that the issues important to me, such as those affecting women, children, lawyers, and Charleston, were addressed."

According to Williams, in the 1920s, South Carolina passed laws that both allowed for women's suffrage but also denied women the ability to serve on juries, since they were selected from the ranks of registered voters. She said that, "the issue of allowing women to serve on juries was considered and defeated by each General Assembly from 1949 until 1966".

I was a member of the 95th General Assembly in 1963 and 1964 and recall that at the time there was no expectation of sufficient votes for passage. (Allegedly, the major objection was the cost to provide jury lavatories, two for males and two for women, one each for "Coloreds" and "Whites.") I concluded that the reason for the defeat of this measure was that the plaintiff's attorneys controlled the House and Senate. They did not want women on their juries because they assumed women could not think in terms of big money (i.e., large verdicts).

Williams said that this ban on women serving on juries persisted in South Carolina until after the Federal case of White v. Crook in 1966, which made it unconstitutional to bar women from juries, and that this case prompted the legislature to pass an amendment to the South Carolina constitution to allow women to serve. South Carolina would be the second to last state to allow women to serve on juries in 1967, with Mississippi being the last in 1968.

=== Defeat ===
She lost her bid for re-election in 1964 in part for supporting Lyndon Johnson in his bid for re-election. After her loss, Congressman L. Mendel Rivers called to console her.

== Later life ==
In 1971, after serving in the South Carolina House, Williams was asked by Winthrop College President Charles Davis to "lead a committee of alumni" to work towards making Winthrop a coeducational institution by lobbying for a legislative change to the college's charter. The Winthrop charter had established the college as a women's only college. She stated that her time "serving in the General Assembly gave [her] a good understanding of how the lobbying process works."

As a result of these efforts, the South Carolina government passed a law giving the Winthrop Board of Trustees the authority to decide the coeducation issue and the Board decided to change the charter to allow for coeducation. She later said that she considered this endeavor and achievement her "biggest contribution" in her life to Winthrop.

At age 45, Ruth Williams married Claude Murphy Cupp, a retired Army doctor, and changed her name into Ruth Cupp. After ending her time in the House, she went on to practice at "one of the largest law firms in the state, Sinkler, Gibbs, and Simons", and later worked as in-house counsel for the Medical University of South Carolina, then started her own practice after leaving MUSC. She became an Associate Judge of Probate and practiced from 1990 to 1994.

In her 60s, Cupp began to focus on writing, ultimately publishing three books. She also wrote about the city of North Charleston in a weekly column for The Post and Courier. A collection of her 68 articles was later bound into a North Area Scrap Book and the City of North Charleston website states that it serves as the "definitive source" for local North Charleston lore. In the foreword to the book, Cupp wrote: "While I was not born here, my heart and soul were."

== Memberships and affiliations ==
Cupp served on the Executive Committee of the Charleston County Bar, as a member of the Executive Committee of the South Carolina Women Lawyers Association, and on the Executive Committee of the Senior Lawyers Division of the South Carolina Bar. She later commented, "I did not know until I arrived that I was the first female to attend [the Charleston County Bar], and I did not know until almost 50 years later that a senior member objected to my presence." She also chaired the South Carolina Children's Bureau.

== Awards and honors ==
In 2015, the Charleston County Bar honored Cupp with the James Louis Petigru Award. The Bar's highest award is not given annually but at the discretion of the association's standing committee for demonstrating sterling principles as a lawyer. Cupp said about receiving the award:

I would say that the comradery at this Bar is superior to any other Bar group anywhere. When I graduated from law school in 1954, my class was the last new group that had to stand before the South Carolina Supreme Court and swear we would not settle any disputes by dueling. During my 61 years practicing law, I am pleased to say I have never settled one dispute against a fellow attorney by dueling.

== Works ==
Cupp authored three books. Portia Steps up to the Bar is about the history of South Carolina women lawyers. Cupp said she owed her success to those that came before her. Attorneys from Charles Town to Charleston is about the history of Charleston lawyers. Miracles on St. Margaret Street discusses the history of the Florence Crittenton Programs of South Carolina; Cupp was involved with this organization, which assisted single expectant women.

== Personal life ==
Cupp's sister, Patsy Williams Hughes Mizell, followed her lead entering politics and becoming the first woman elected to the North Charleston City Council in 1974 and the only woman to serve in the office during her 21 years. Cupp traveled extensively, going with family to England, Spain, and Ireland, as well as traveling on her own to Antarctica, Tibet, and India; late in her life, her favorite destination was Oxford and she would travel there yearly well into her 80s.

=== Death and burial ===
Cupp died on July 9, 2016. Her funeral was held at St. Michael's Episcopal Church, one of the Four Corners of Law in downtown Charleston.

== Bibliography ==
- Cupp, Ruth (2003). Portia Steps Up To The Bar: The First Women Lawyers. Raleigh, NC: IVY House Publishing Group. ISBN 9781571973696.
- Cupp, Ruth (2006). Attorneys; From Charles Town to Charleston. Birmingham, AL: Association Publishing Co. ISBN 978-0966838060.
- Cupp, Ruth (2013). Miracles on St. Margaret Street: Florence Crittenton Programs of SC. Charleston, SC: Arcadia Publishing. ISBN 9781589730335.
