= Puzzle jug =

Trick drinking vessel

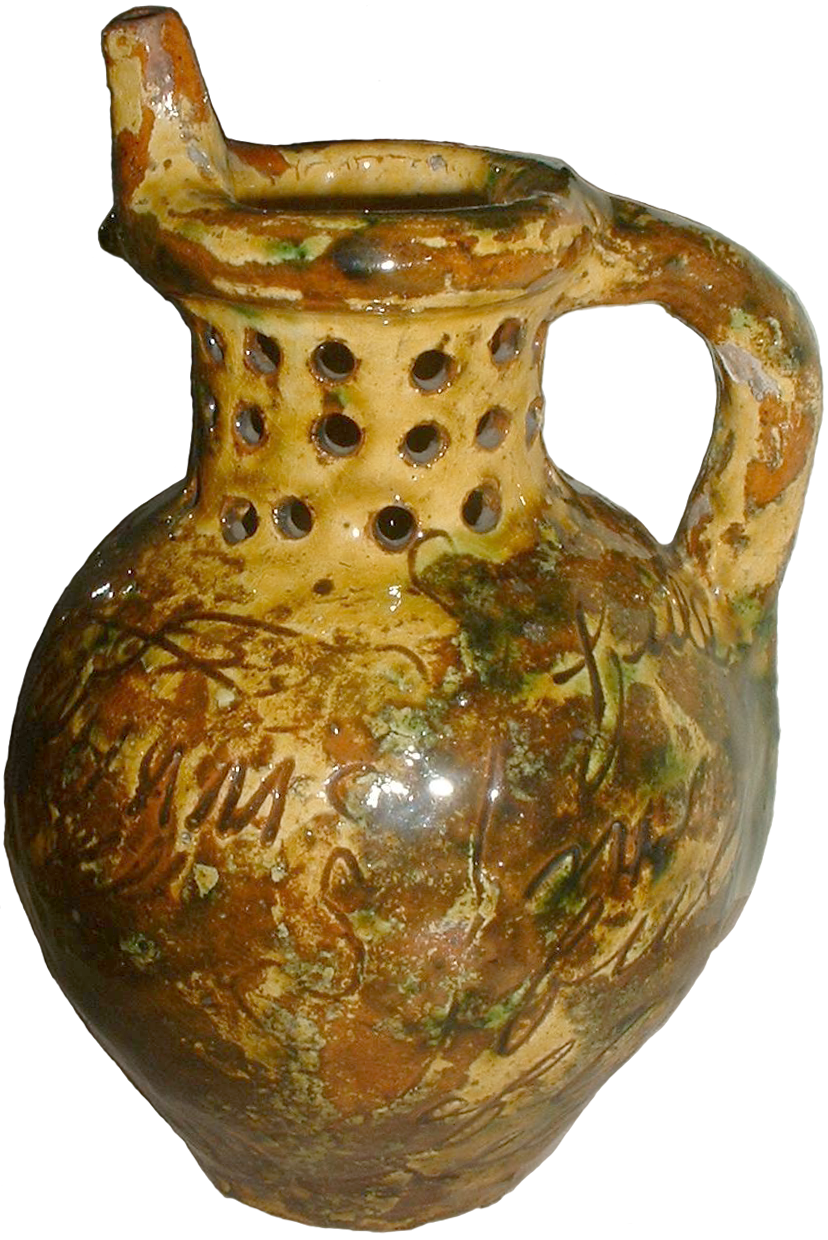
A puzzle jug from the Museum of Somerset in England

Principle of operation of a puzzle jug: covering the optional hole in the handle with a finger allows sucking up the drink as with a straw

A puzzle jug is a practical joke device and puzzle in the form of a jug, popular in the 17th and 18th centuries. Puzzle jugs of varying quality were popular in homes and taverns. An inscription typically challenges the drinker to consume the contents without spilling them, which, because the neck of the jug is perforated, is impossible to do conventionally.

The solution to the puzzle is that the jug has a hidden tube, one end of which is the spout. The tube usually runs around the rim and then down the handle, with its other opening inside the jug and near the bottom. To solve the puzzle, the drinker must suck from the spout end of the tube. To make the puzzle more interesting, it was common to provide a number of additional holes along the tube, which must be closed off before the contents could be sucked. Some jugs even have a hidden hole to make the challenge still more confounding.

== History ==
The earliest example in England is the Exeter puzzle jug—an example of medieval pottery in Britain. The Exeter puzzle jug dates from about AD 1300 and was originally made in Saintonge, Western France. The puzzle jug is a descendant of earlier drinking puzzles, such as the fuddling cup and the pot crown, each of which has a different solution.

== See also ==
- Bridge-spouted vessel
- Dribble glass
- Pythagorean cup
