= Robert Ehrlich (physicist) =

American physicist, educator and book author

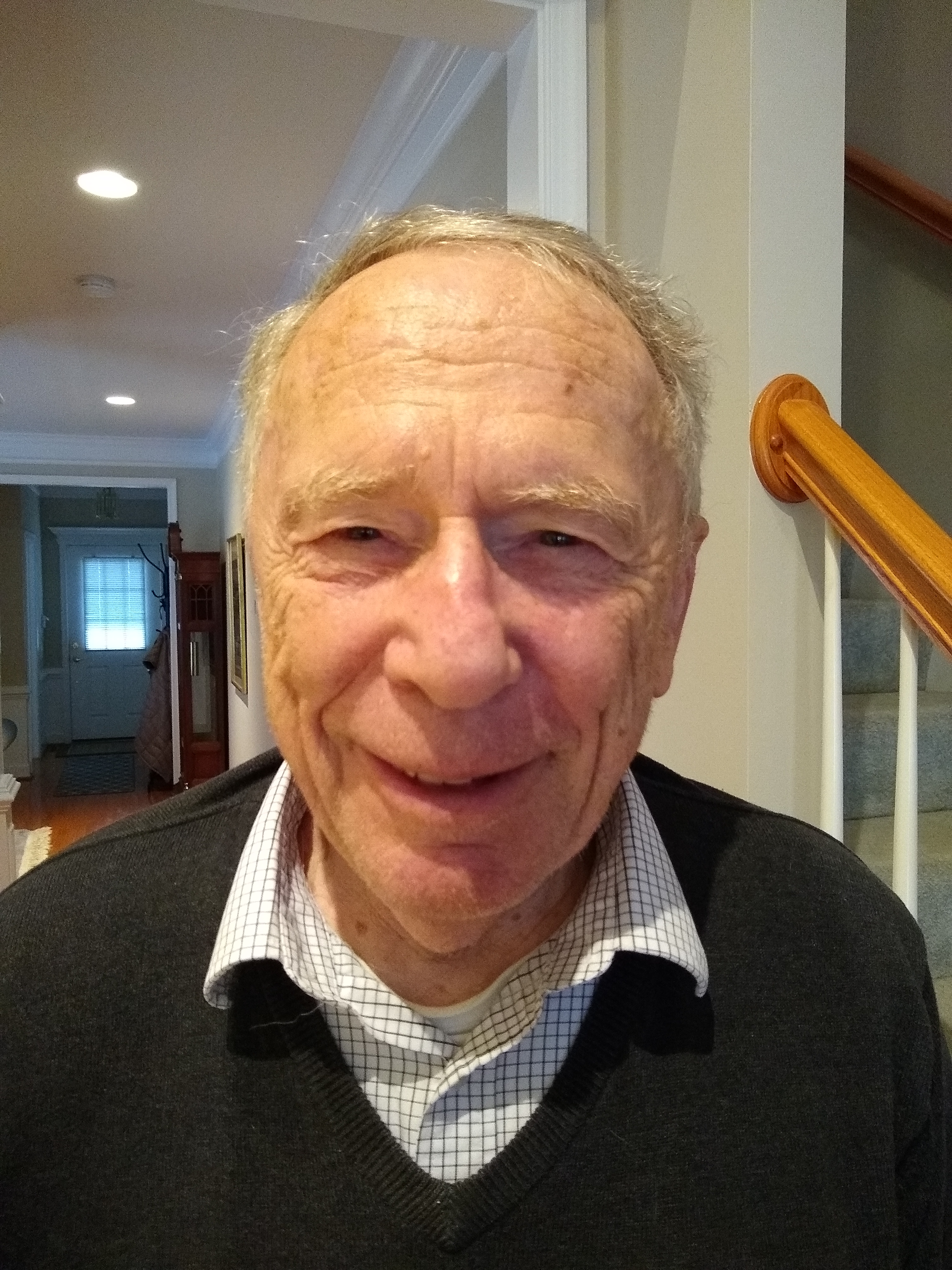
Robert Ehrlich in 2020

Robert Ehrlich (born 1938) is an American physicist. He has a Bachelor of Science (Φβκ) from Brooklyn College (1959), and a Ph.D. in physics from Columbia University (1964). Under his Ph.D. advisor, Nobel Laureate Jack Steinberger, he participated in the Nobel prize-winning muon neutrino experiment. From 1963 to 1966 he held a postdoctoral position at the University of Pennsylvania and from 1966 to 1970 he was assistant professor at Rutgers University. In 1970 he accepted a position as associate professor at SUNY New Paltz, where he served as acting chair of the department of physics. From 1977 until his becoming professor emeritus in 2013, he was professor of physics at George Mason University in Fairfax, Virginia, having served 15 years as department of physics chair.

Ehrlich was elected a fellow of the American Physical Society in 1991, "for application of physics to aspects of the nuclear arms race and contributions to public education in physics". Ehrlich's primary area of scholarship is particle physics. He is also well known for his contributions to science education, particularly with simple physics demonstrations and computer applications in physics education. Another area of his scholarship is energy and the environment, specifically nuclear arms control and renewable energy. His books have been translated into six languages.

== Publications ==
Other scholars have cited Ehrlich's published books (12 authored, 10 edited) and over 100 articles approximately 800 times. These citations are available via his Google Scholar page (see below under External links). The list of books and articles can be found here. The books mainly deal with science for the general public, physics education, energy and the environment, and nuclear arms control, and most of them are listed below by category.

=== Physics education and science for the general public ===
Turning the World Inside Out and 174 Other Simple Physics Demonstrations. Princeton University Press, 1991. Reviewed by Stewart E. Brekke. Also available in Japanese and Portuguese translations.

The cosmological milkshake: a semi-serious look at the size of things. New Brunswick, NJ : Rutgers University Press, 1994. Also available in Finnish and Japanese translations.

What if you could unscramble an egg?. Rutgers University Press, 1998. Reviewed by Brooke Ignatowski.American Scientist 84, 6, (1996): p. 588.

What If?: Mind-Boggling Science Questions for Kids. John Wiley & Sons, 1998. Also available in a Japanese translation.

Nine Crazy Ideas in Science: A Few Might Even Be True. Princeton: Princeton University Press 2002. Reviewed by Andrzej Stasiak. Also available in Italian, Japanese, Korean, Latvian, and Portuguese translations.

Eight Preposterous Propositions: from The Genetics of Homosexuality to The Benefits of Global Warming. Princeton University Press, 2003. Reviewed by Andrzej Stasiak and by Walter Gratzer. Also available in a Japanese translation.

Why Toast Lands Jelly-side Down: Zen and the Art of Physics Demonstrations. Princeton University Press, 1977. Review by Jim Jardine.

Physics and Computers: Problems, Simulation and Data Analysis. Boston, Houghton Mifflin, 1973. Reviewed by Harwood G. Kolsky.

=== Computers in physics: the CUPS Project ===
Together with his Mason colleague Maria Dworzecka and William M. MacDonald of the University of Maryland, Ehrlich was a director of the NSF-funded "Consortium for Upper-Level Physics Software (CUPS)" The project involved an international team of 29 physicists. It generated nine books published by John Wiley & Sons and 27 simulations covering many of the areas of junior-senior courses for undergraduate physics majors. All nine of the books have been translated into Japanese, and one has been translated into Italian. Three of the simulations have won awards. All the programs have now been placed on the Internet Archive Software Collection and can be run from that site. At the invitation of UNESCO, workshops on the CUPS software were conducted in Egypt, Jordan, Syria, and the United Arab Emirates.

=== Environmental and energy scholarship ===
Renewable Energy: A First Course. Boca Raton: CRC Press: Taylor & Francis Group, 2012. Reviewed by Cameron Reed. Also available in a second edition (jointly with Harold Geller), 2018, and a third edition (with Harold Geller and J. Robert Cressman) 2022.

Perspectives on Nuclear War And Peace Education. New York : Greenwood Press, 1987.

Waging Nuclear Peace: The Technology and Politics of Nuclear Weapons. SUNY Press, 1985. Reviewed by Rick Sincere Also reviewed by John D. Constable

== Tachyon research and education ==
Since the 1990s, Ehrlich has investigated the possible existence of tachyons, that is, hypothetical subatomic particles that travel faster than the speed of light in vacuum, especially tachyonic or superluminal neutrinos, about which much has been written. He has published extensively in this area, including a 2022 review of all searches for evidence of tachyons. Ehrlich is hoping to interest the KATRIN experiment in conducting a test of his model. KATRIN's 2019 and 2021 results appear to be consistent with both the standard neutrino mass hierarchy having three nearly equal mass neutrinos and his exotic 3 + 3 model. That model, based on an analysis of supernova SN 1987A postulates three doublets of active and sterile neutrinos, having specific masses, one of which is tachyonic having m^{2} ~ -0.2 keV^{2} Ehrlich's model would also be proven right or wrong if a new supernova were to be observed in our galaxy, but these occur only two or three times per century. Supernovae have been observed in other galaxies, but they are so distant that no neutrinos have yet been detected from them. Ehrlich has written a book on tachyons intended for both the general reader and physicists: Hunting the Faster than Light Tachyon, and Finding Three Unicorns and a Herd of Elephants, published by CRC Press, Taylor & Francis Group in 2022. The book describes the half-century-long search by the author and others for evidence of the reality of tachyons, and more specifically the notion that some neutrinos are tachyons. Among all the known particles, only neutrinos might be tachyons, because neither their m^{2} nor their dv = c - v has ever been definitively observed to be positive. Ehrlich has also created educational videos about tachyons and time travel, which can be found on his web site "The Tachyon Nexus."

== Personal life ==
Ehrlich has been married to his wife Elaine since 1961. They have two sons and two grandchildren. He is a founding member and Past President of George Mason University's Retired Faculty Association, and currently serves as their Webmaster and Program Planning Chair.
