= Pythagorean cup =

Cup with a central siphon drain

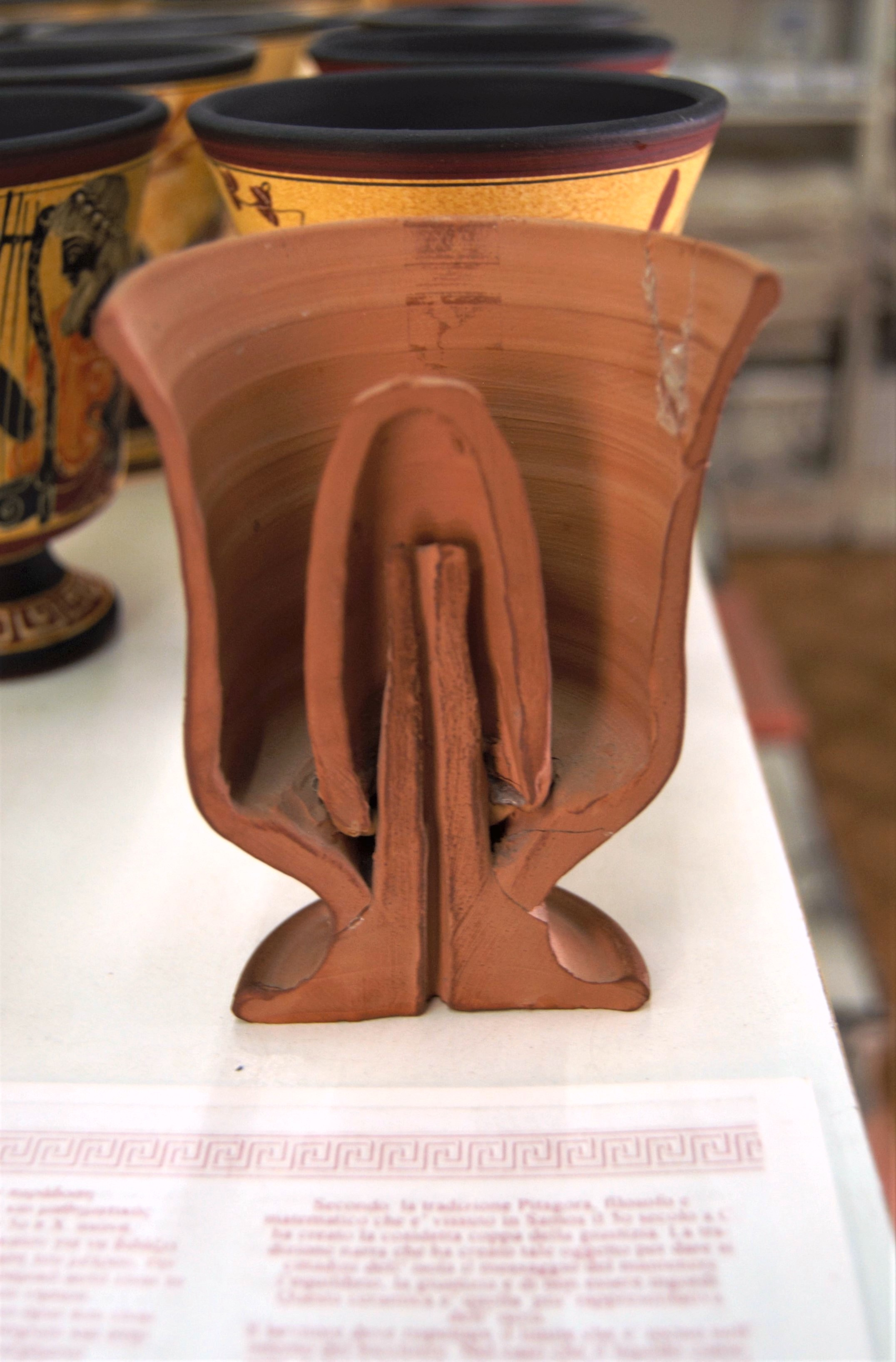
Cross section of a ceramic Pythagorean cup

A Pythagorean cup (also known as a Pythagoras cup, greedy cup, cup of justice, anti greedy goblet or Tantalus cup) is a practical joke device in the form of a drinking cup. When it is filled beyond a certain point, a siphoning effect causes the cup to drain its entire contents through the base. The cup has been used to make statements about greed.

== History ==
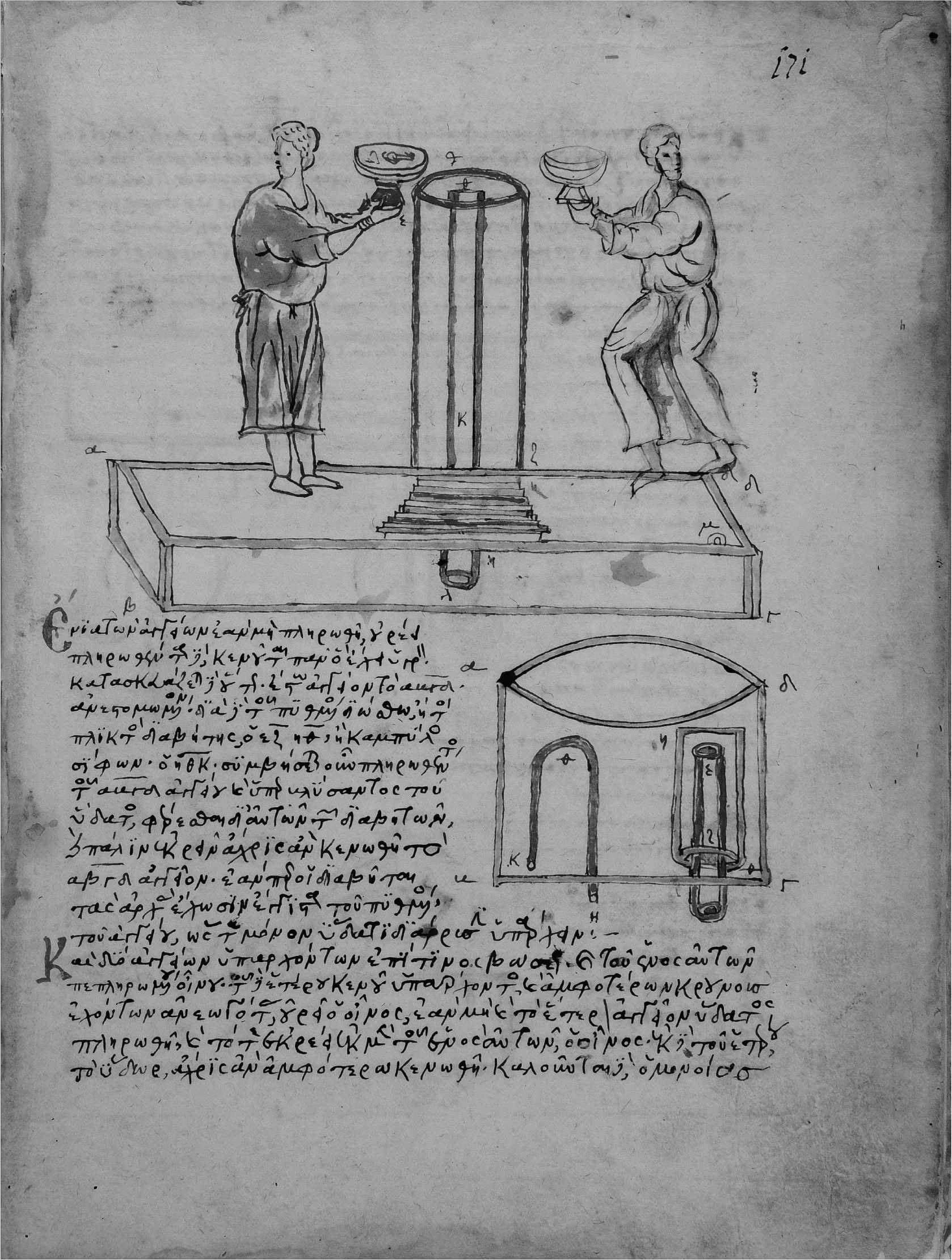
The cup illustrated in a 14th-century manuscript of Hero's Pneumatica, generally assumed to closely follow the original.

Hero of Alexandria (1st century) describes "a vessel from which the contents flow when filled to a certain height", equipped with this siphon system. The earliest Tantalus cup known to survive is a silver Roman example from the late 4th century.

The Banū Mūsā brothers (9th century) included an identical mechanism in their Book of Ingenious Devices. Charles the Good purchased such a cup in 1117, and a Tantalus cup from c. 1200 was discovered in Zaporizhzhia Oblast. Villard de Honnecourt (13th century) also describes a trick cup of similar design, which may have had a siphon mechanism.

Cups of this design had been imported into Western Europe by the 16th century, and they were commonly included in 18th- and 19th-century "cabinets of physics".

A recent folk tradition connects the cup's design to Pythagoras.

== Form and function ==
Cross section of a Pythagorean cup being filled: at B, it is possible to drink all the liquid in the cup; but at C, the siphon effect causes the cup to drain

A Pythagorean cup looks like a normal drinking cup, except that the bowl has a central column in it. The central column of the bowl is positioned directly over the stem of the cup and over a hole at the bottom of the stem. A small open pipe runs from this hole almost to the top of the central column, where there is an open chamber. The chamber is connected by a second pipe to the bottom of the central column, where a hole in the column exposes the pipe to (the contents of) the bowl of the cup.

When the cup is filled, liquid rises through the second pipe up to the chamber at the top of the central column, following Pascal's principle of communicating vessels. As long as the level of the liquid does not rise beyond the level of the chamber, the cup functions as normal. If the level rises further, however, the liquid spills through the chamber into the first pipe and out of the bottom. Gravity then creates a siphon through the central column, causing the entire contents of the cup to be emptied through the hole at the bottom of the stem.

== Mechanics ==
A Pythagorean siphon is composed of four chambers with one chamber in the center that liquids can escape through. As liquid fills up the four chambers, the pressure acting on the liquids remains constant and so the level of liquid in each chamber remains the same. Once the liquid reaches the top of the Pythagorean siphon it begins to escape through the central chamber as the effects of gravity take hold.

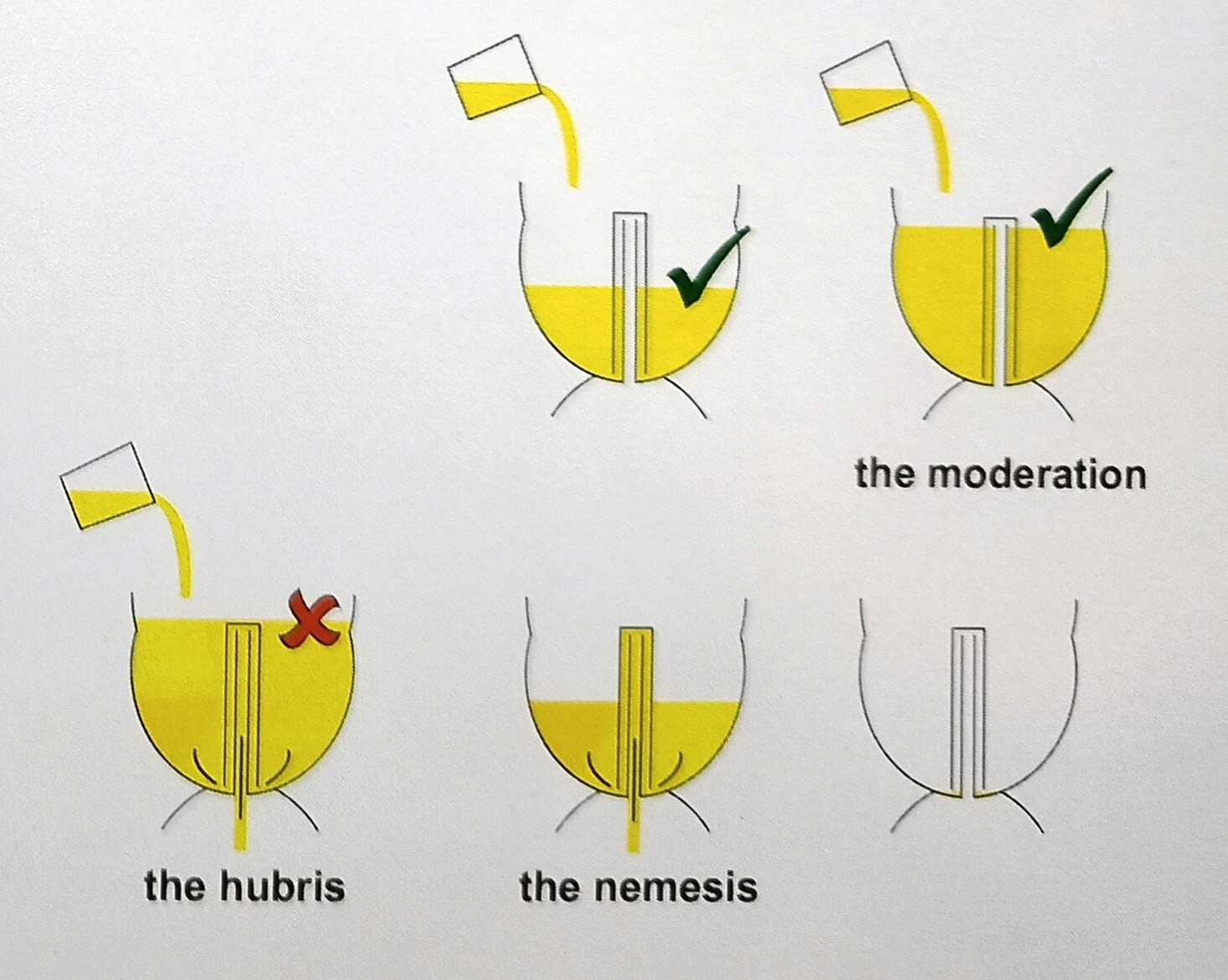
Instructions of how to use the Pythagoras' cup by Kotsanas Museum of Ancient Greek Technology.

As this process happens, the liquid from both two chambers next to each side of the central chamber forms a seal above the central chamber due to the surface tension of the liquids. Due to this seal, air can then not escape through the central chamber, so the weight of the water in the central chamber forces all the remaining liquid in every chamber to pour out of the Pythagorean siphon.

== Applications ==
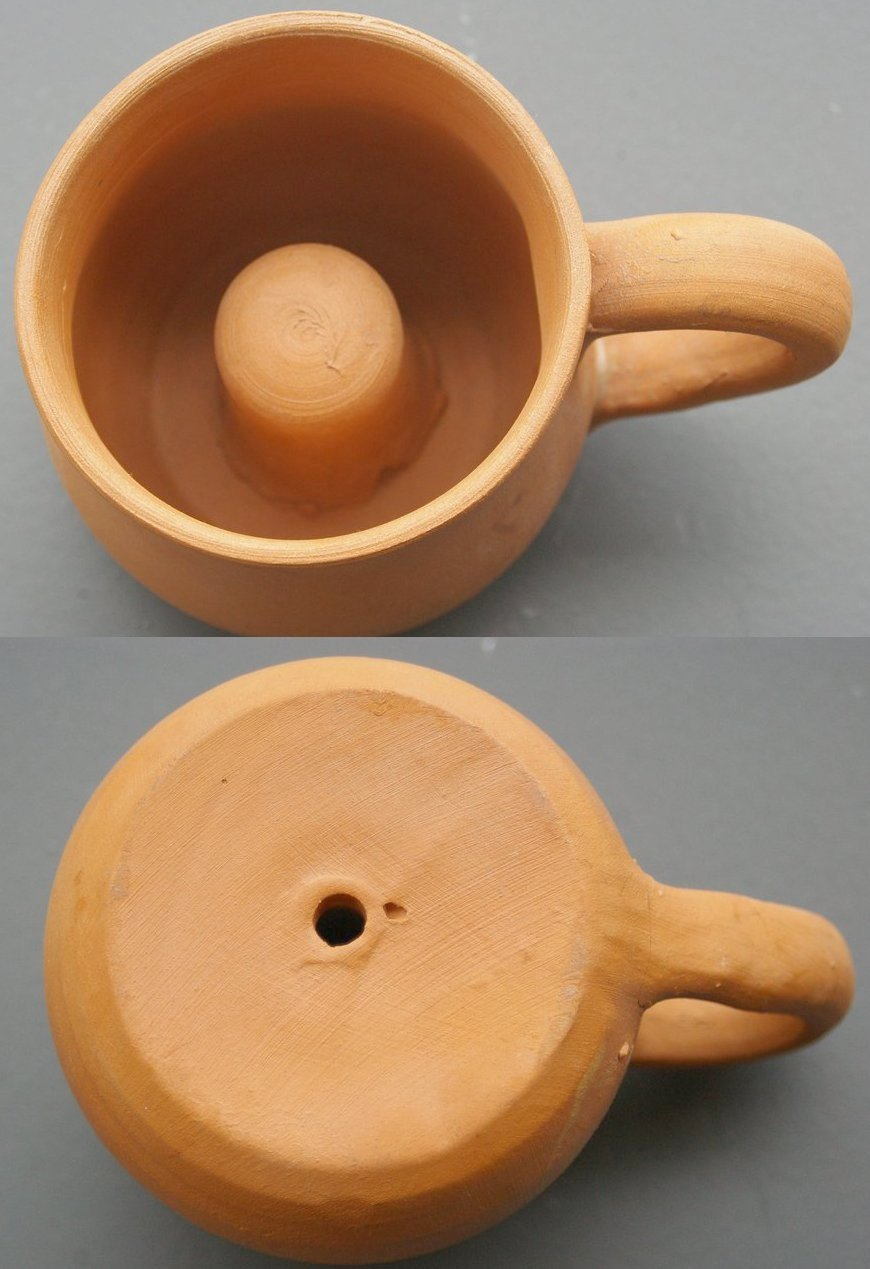
A Pythagorean cup sold in Crete, known as o kounenos tis dikaiosynis ("the cup of justice")

=== Toilets ===
Most modern American flush toilets operate on the same principle: when the water level in the bowl rises high enough, a siphon is created, emptying the bowl.

=== Washing machines ===
The fabric softener tray in a top-load washing machine operates by utilizing a Pythagorean siphon to distribute fabric softener diluted with water across the clothing in the washing machine. Before starting the washing machine, the user pours fabric softener below the maximum fabric softener line in the loading tray. This line designates the point where if the softener were to be poured above it, then all the fabric softener would resultingly escape the device due to the mechanics of the Pythagorean siphon. As one pours the fabric softener under the line, it does not escape anywhere because it has not begun to escape through the center chamber.

Once the washing machine works to distribute the fabric softener into the tub of the machine, it pours water above the fabric softener loading tray so that the liquid goes over the maximum fill line. This starts the Pythagorean siphon process, as the mixture begins to pour through the central chamber, thus causing a seal from the surface tension of the liquids across all the chambers. The weight of the fabric softener diluted with water has no access to the outside air because of the seal which then causes all the mixture to be poured directly into the washing machine.

== See also ==
- Dribble glass
- Fuddling cup
- Heron's fountain
- List of practical joke topics
- Puzzle jug
- Qiqi, a Chinese cup with a similar function.
- Soxhlet extractor, which uses the same mechanism.
