= Fuddling cup =

Three-dimensional puzzle jug popular in 17th- and 18th-century England

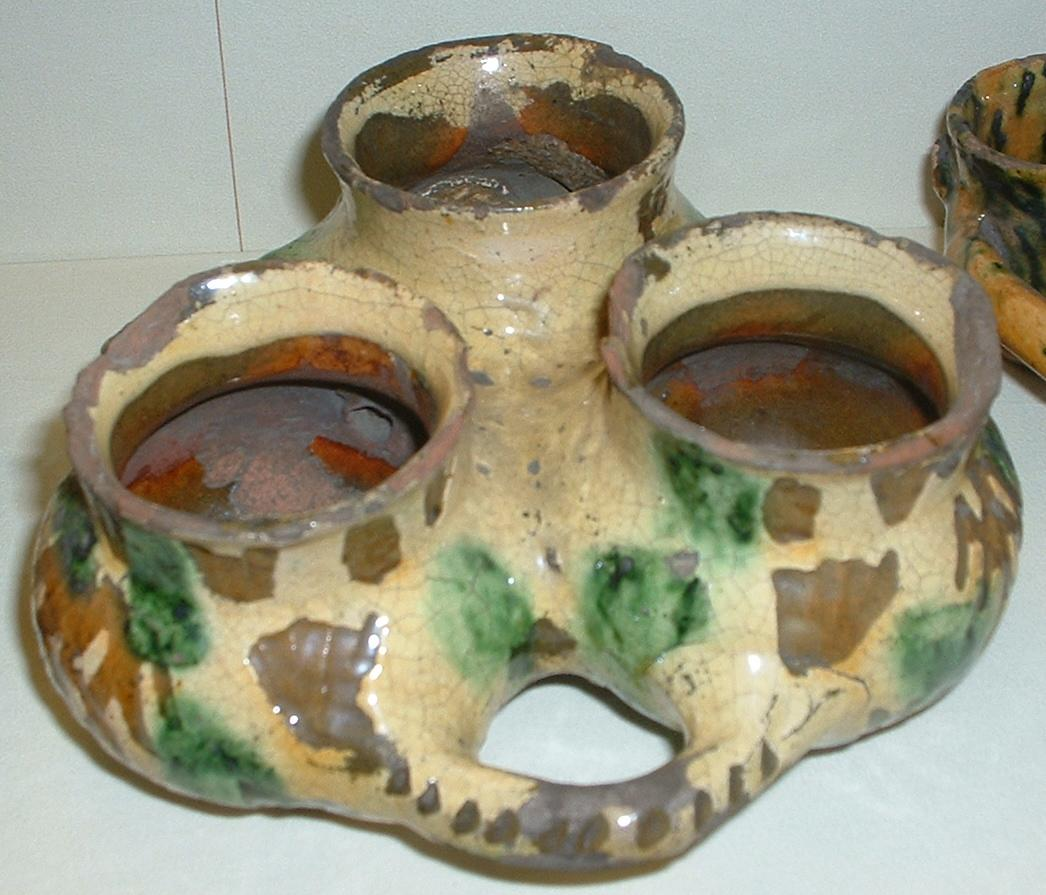
Fuddling cups

A fuddling cup is a three-dimensional puzzle in the form of a drinking vessel, made of three or more cups or jugs with interconnecting bodies all linked together by holes and tubes in which liquor poured into one cup would disappear in one cup and reappear in another cup. The name “fuddling” in this cup has two meanings—to both confuse and intoxicate. Fuddling cups were especially popular in 17th and 18th century England.

In Archaeologia Cambrensis, a custom is described, a cup was placed on the head of the village belle and the challenge of the puzzle was to drink from the vessel in such a way that the beverage does not spill while the cup rested on the girl's head. To do this successfully, one must drink from the cups in a specific order. For the cups to be drained, a correct starting point has to be found.

Juliet Fleming noted, in Graffiti and the Writing Arts of Early Modern England, that a fuddling cup was a “toy machine” which was meant for entertainment, not for a practical purpose. Many such cups had words inscribed on the side which showcased the fun nature of the game. It was one of the 'joke' drinking pots of the 17th and 18th centuries.

Fuddling cups were made from the mid-17th century to the late 18th in graffito slipware in two potteries in Somerset and in tin-glazed earthenware before that.

== See also ==
- Dribble glass
- Puzzle jug
- Pythagorean cup
