= List of practical joke topics =

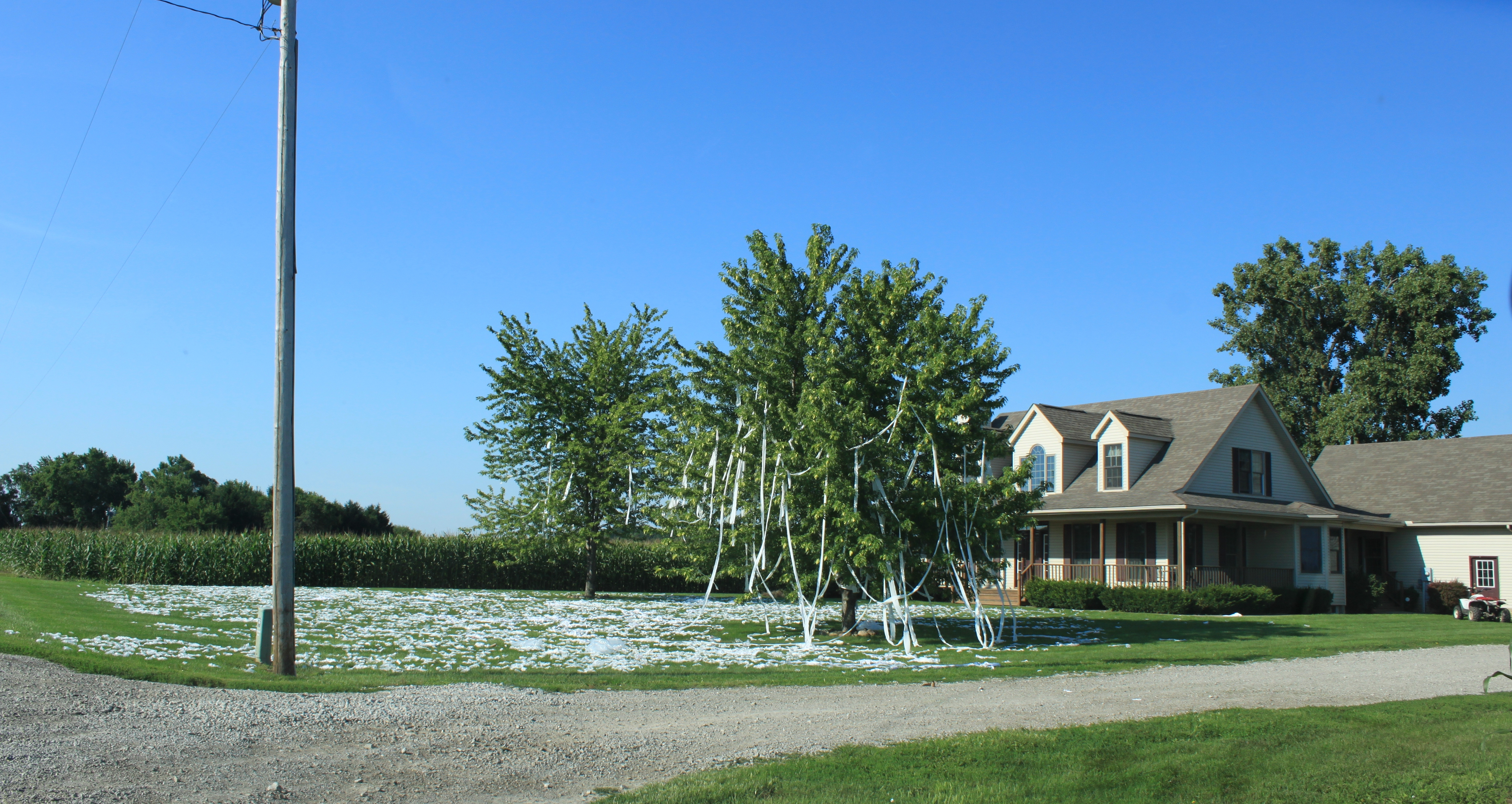
A toilet papered residence in Deerfield, Michigan

This is a list of practical joke topics (also known as a prank, gag, jape, or shenanigan) which are mischievous tricks or jokes played on someone, typically causing the victim to experience embarrassment, perplexity, confusion, or discomfort.

Practical jokes differ from confidence tricks or hoaxes in that the victim finds out, or is let in on the joke, rather than being fooled into handing over money or other valuables. Practical jokes or pranks are generally lighthearted, reversible and non-permanent, and aim to make the victim feel foolish or victimised to a degree, but may also involve cruelty and become a form of bullying if performed without appropriate finesse.

== Practical jokes ==
=== 0–9 ===
- 2004 Harvard–Yale prank

=== A ===
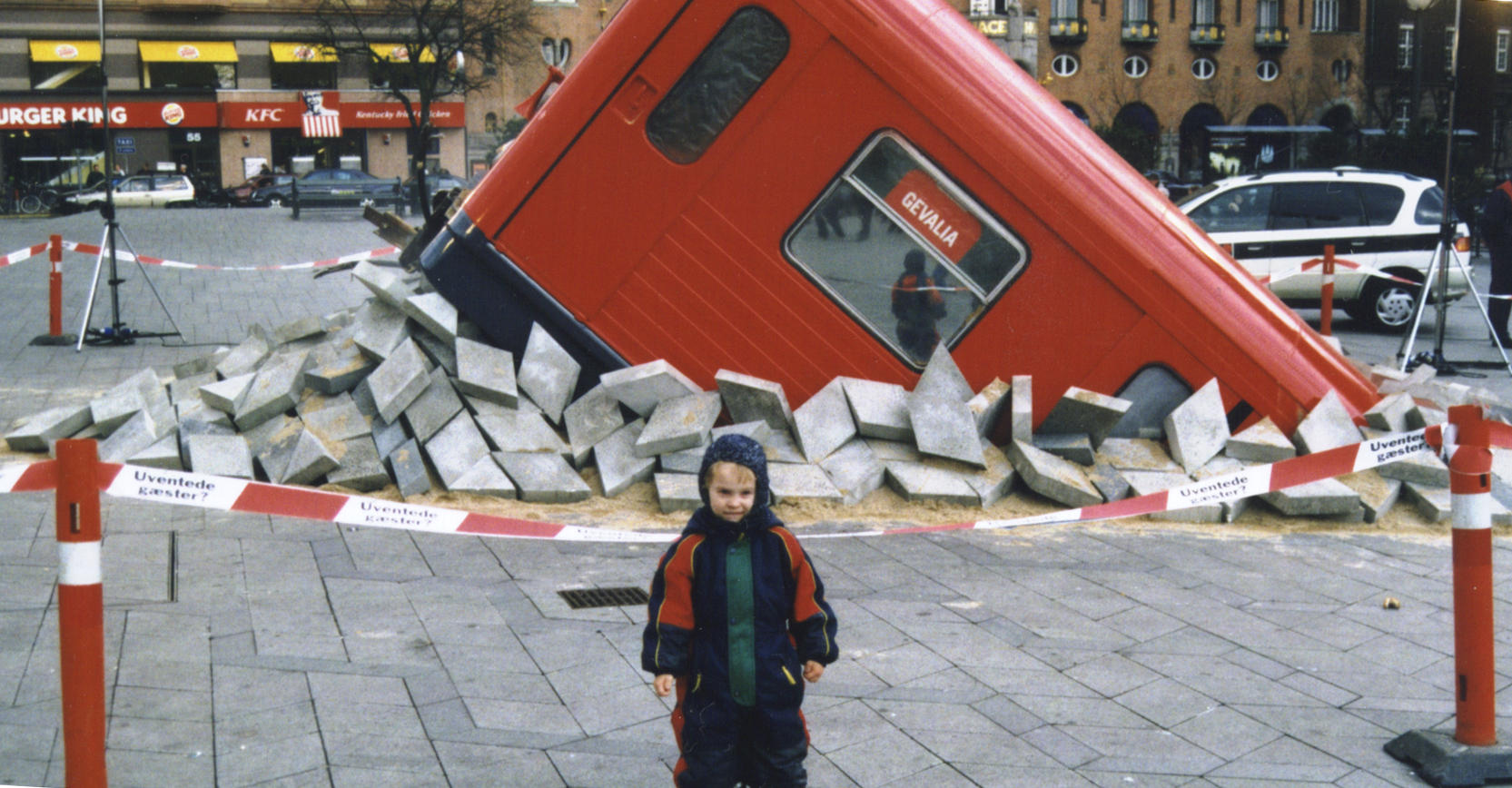
April Fools' Day prank for Copenhagen Metro, 2001

- Alhokm Baad Almozawla
- April Fools' Day
- List of April Fools' Day jokes

=== B ===
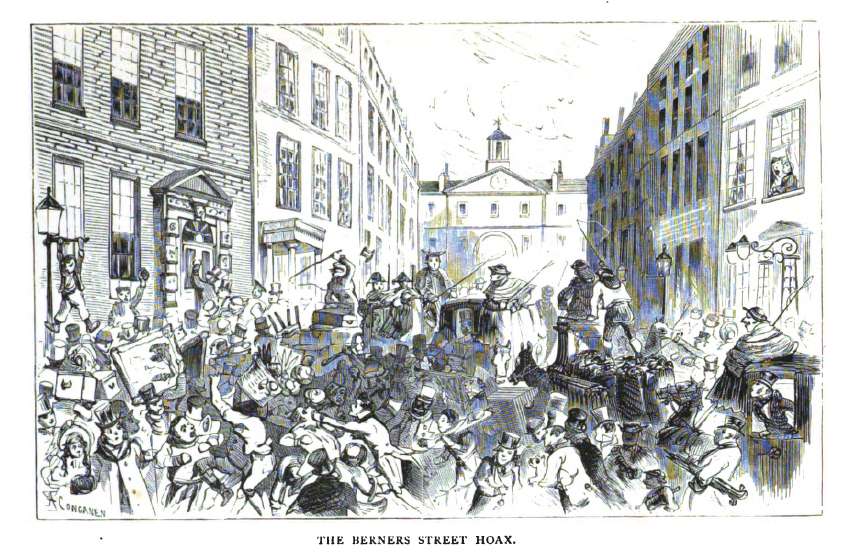
Berners Street hoax. Lithograph by Alfred Concanen

- Baby Jesus theft
- Beadle's About
- Berners Street hoax
- Bingo Shooting Device
- Black fax
- Mr Blobby
- The Russell Brand Show prank calls
- Simon Brodkin

=== C ===
- Caltech–MIT rivalry
- Candid Camera
- Capping stunt
- Josiah S. Carberry
- Chewing gum bug
- Chinese finger trap
- Chinese fire drill
- Confetti eggs/cascerones
- Culture jamming

=== D ===
- Devil's Night
- Devious licks
- Dreadnought hoax
- Dribble glass
- Dutch oven

=== E ===
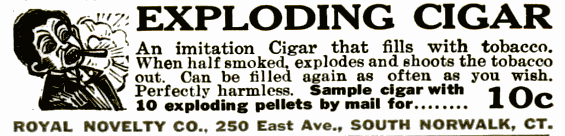
Exploding cigar, 1917 edition of Popular Mechanics

- Egging
- Email spoofing
- Exploding cigar

=== F ===
- Fake denominations of United States currency
- Fake vomit
- Father Pat Noise
- Flagging
- Fonejacker

=== G ===
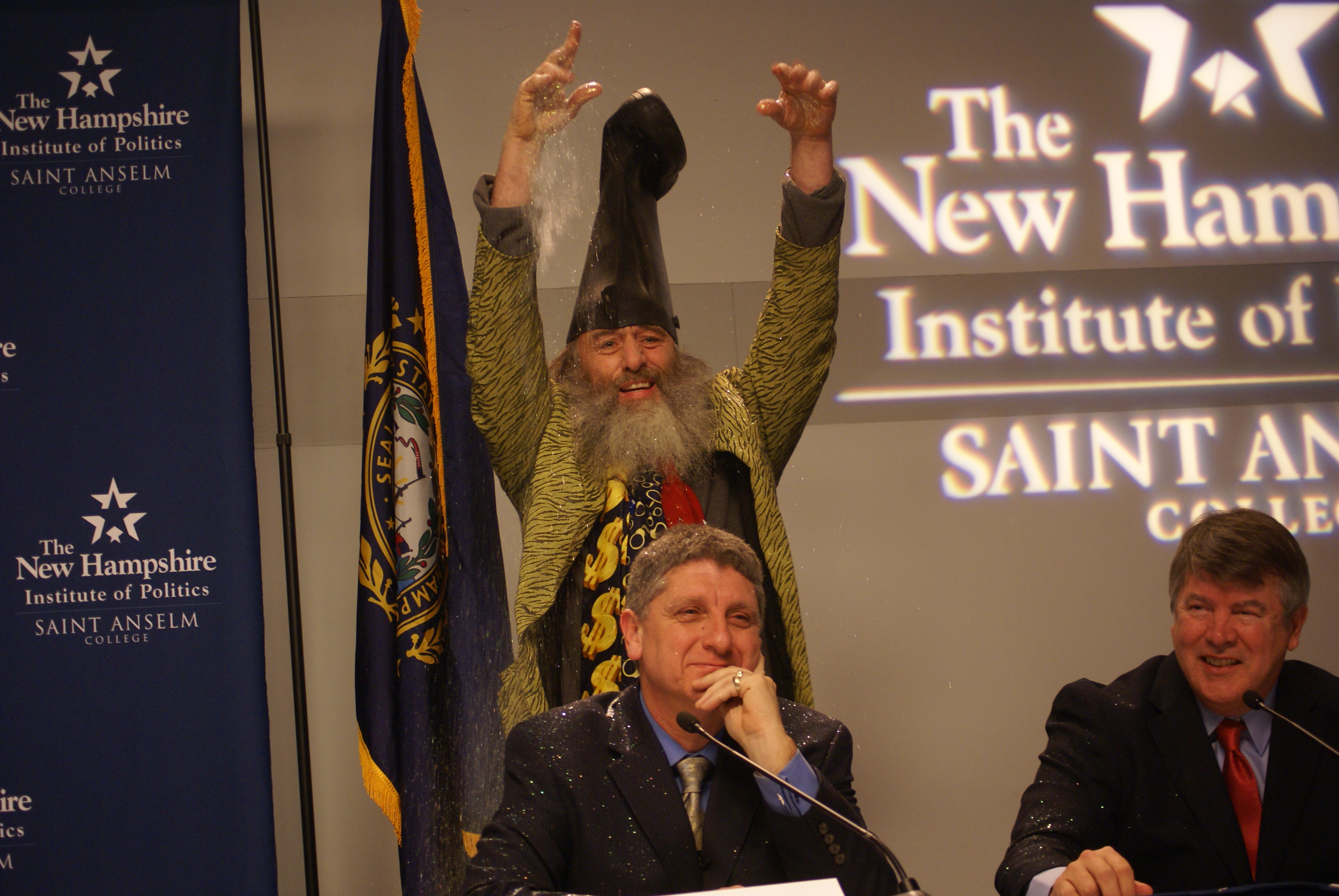
Vermin Supreme glitter bombs Randall Terry

- Gag name
- Game for a Laugh
- Glitter bombing
- Googly eyes
- Golden rivet
- Great Rose Bowl Hoax
- Great Stork Derby
- Groucho glasses

=== H ===
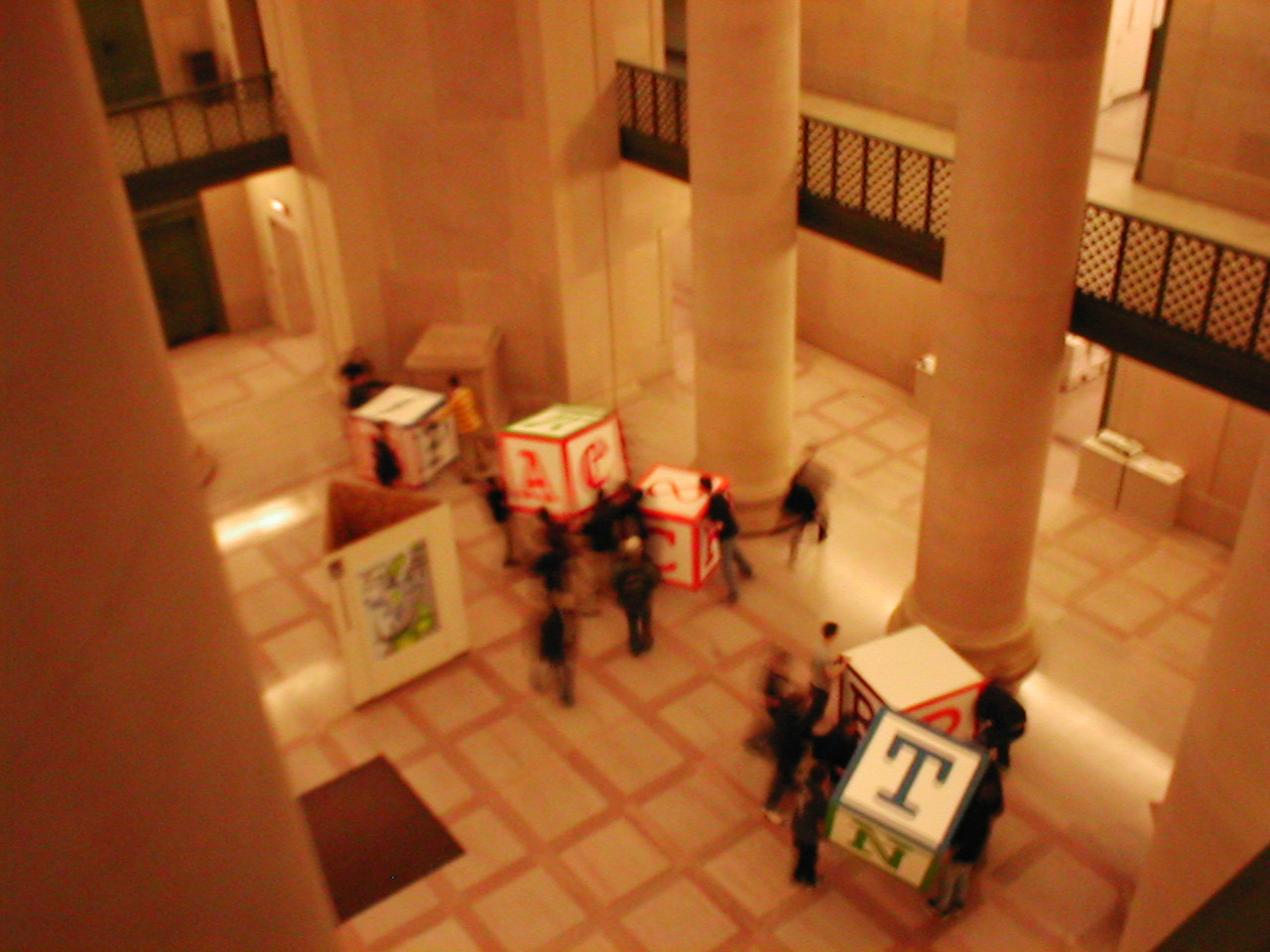
Hacks at MIT

- Hacks at the Massachusetts Institute of Technology
- Harisen
- Henryk Batuta hoax
- Hot foot

=== I ===
- I'm Spazticus
- Indian burn
- Itching powder

=== J ===
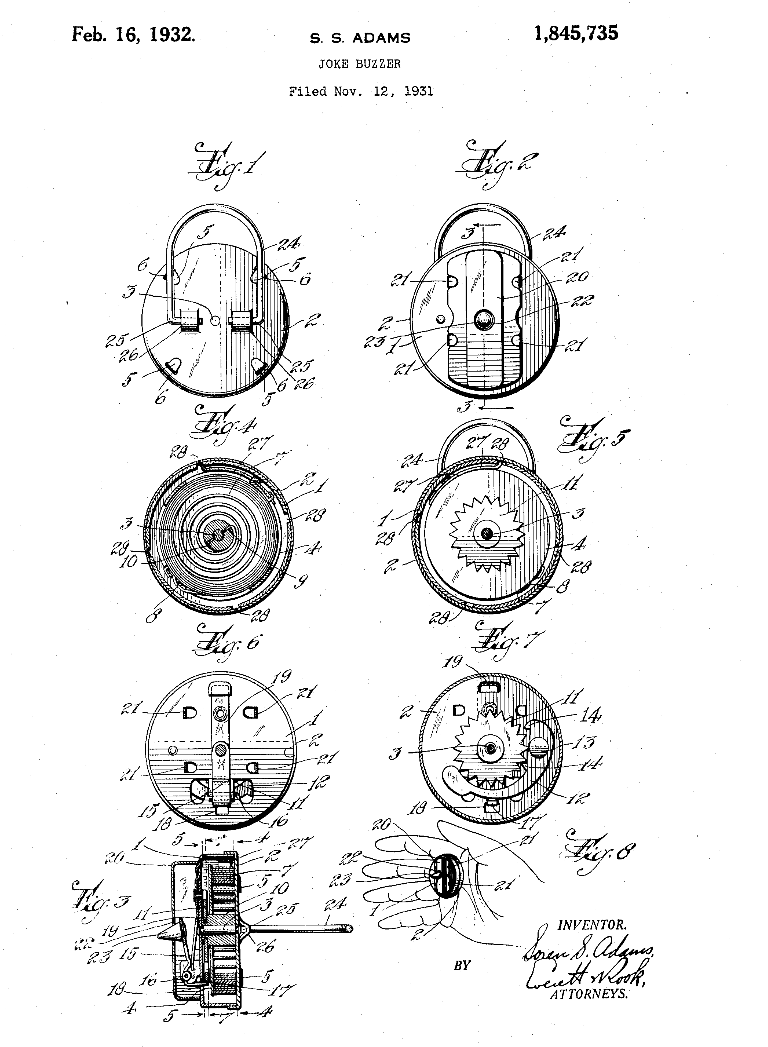
Patent drawing for a joy buzzer, Soren Adams' 1932 U.S. patent

- Joy buzzer
- Juiced with O.J. Simpson

=== K ===
- Kancho
- Knock, Knock, Ginger

=== L ===
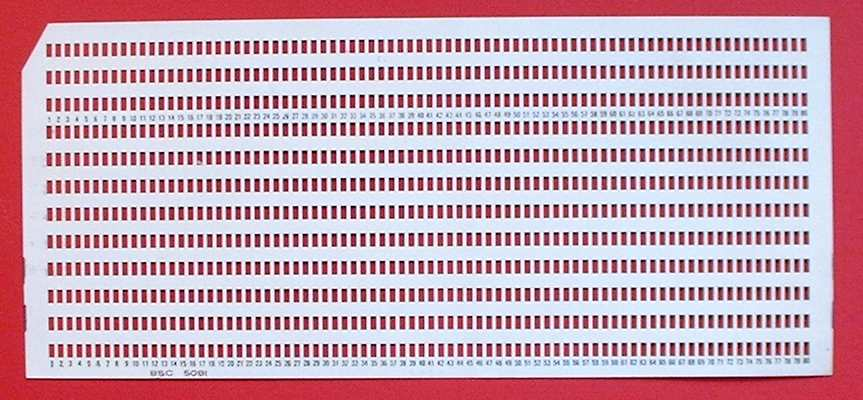
A lace card from the early 1970s

- Lace card
- Latex mask
- List of frivolous political parties
- List of Google April Fools' Day jokes
- List of Google Easter eggs

=== M ===
- Max Headroom signal hijacking
- Milkshaking
- Mischief Night
- Mooning
- Muck-up day

=== N ===
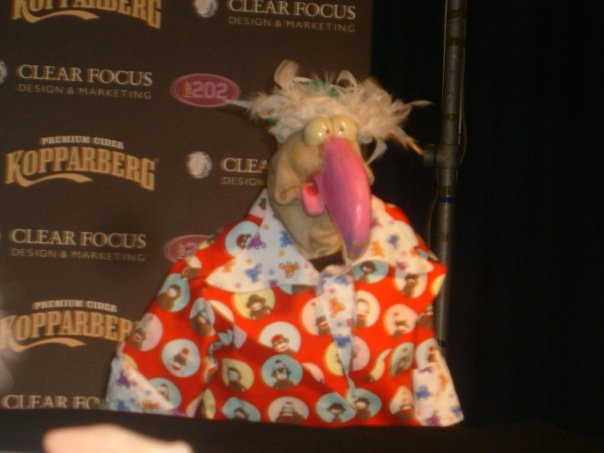
Non-human electoral candidates – Dustin the Turkey, Irish television puppet from the 1997 Irish presidential election

- No soap radio
- Non-human electoral candidates
- Noogie

=== P ===
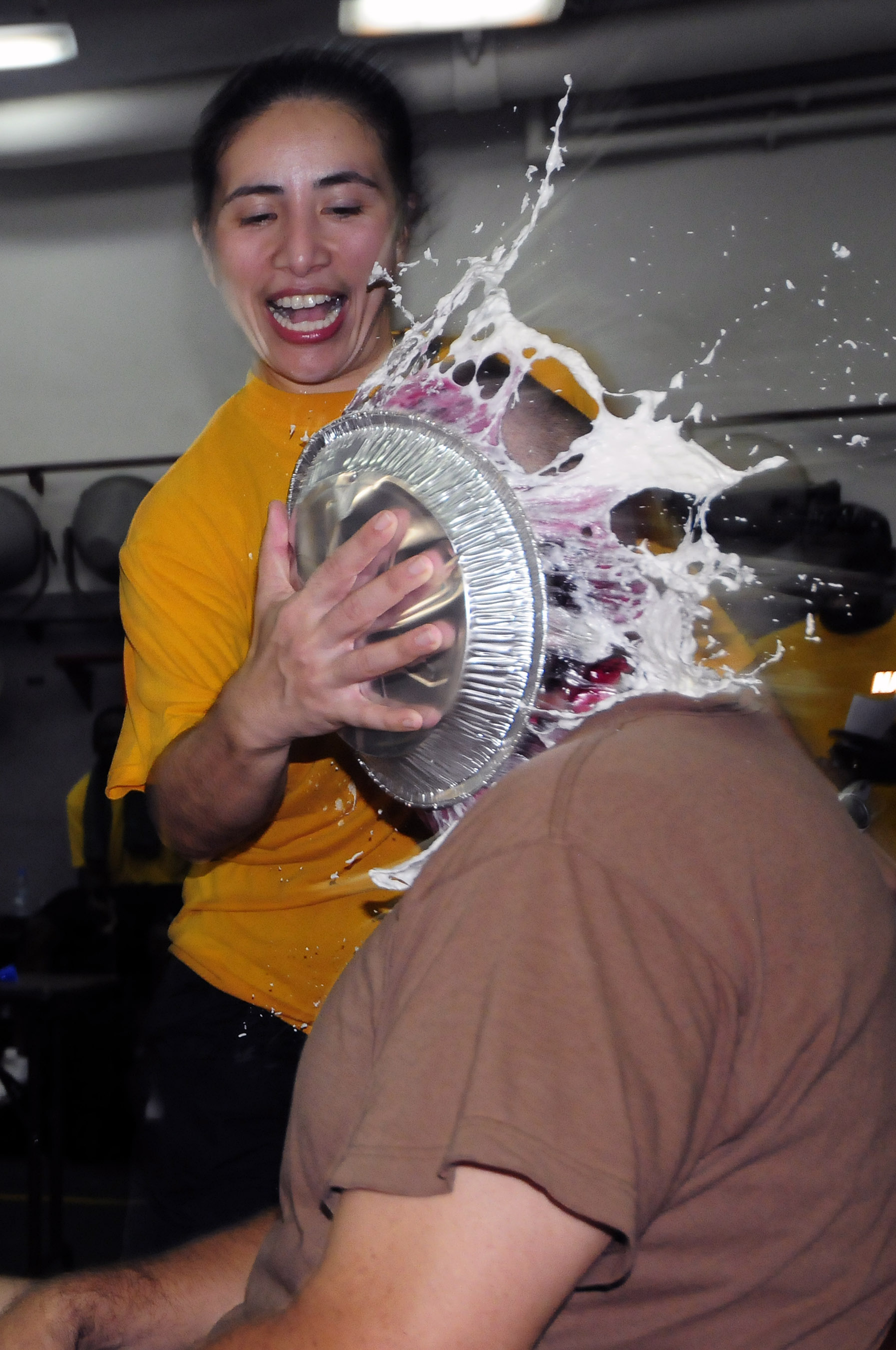
Pieing

- Pantsing
- Panty raid
- Part-time job terrorism – Japanese social phenomenon
- Steve Penk
- Penny under the sink
- Phoenix Five (prank)
- Pieing
- List of people who have been pied
- Pigasus (politics)
- Plate lifter
- Karl Power
- Practical joke device
- Prank call
- Pranknet
- Prank Patrol (Australian TV series)
- Prank Patrol (British TV series)
- Prank Patrol (Canadian TV series)
- Punk'd
- Pythagorean cup

=== Q ===
- ¡Qué Locura!

=== R ===
- Rank the Prank
- Rickrolling
- Rutgers–Princeton Cannon War

=== S ===
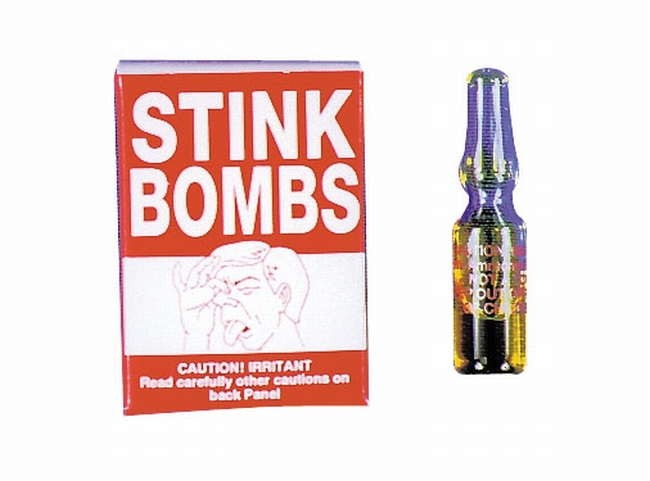
Stink bomb

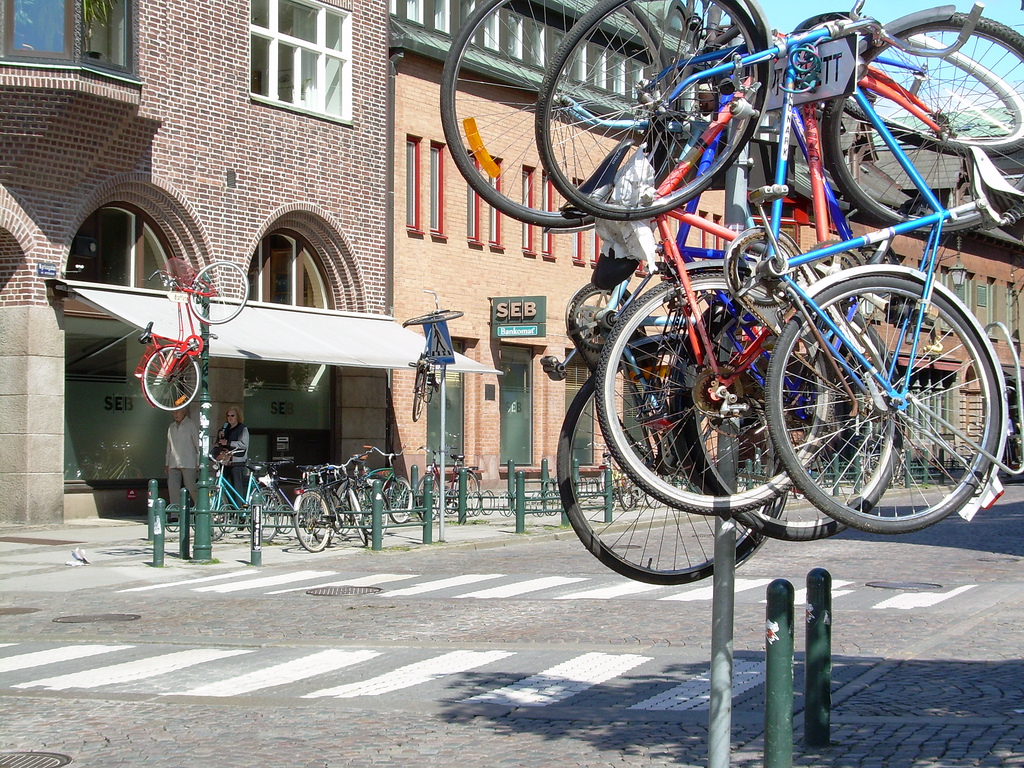
Student prank with bicycles

- Saluting trap
- Senior prank
- Shaft passer
- Shanghai Fugu Agreement
- Shocking gum
- Shoe-lacing
- Skyhook (cable)
- Snake nut can
- Sneezing powder
- Snipe hunt
- Spaghetti Tree Hoax
- Southern Television broadcast interruption
- Spit ball shooting
- Stink bomb
- Student prank
- Streaking
- Suicide of Jacintha Saldanha
- Swirly

=== T ===
- Taro Tsujimoto hoax
- The Jerky Boys
- The Game (mind game)
- Toilet papering
- Towel snap
- Travelling gnome prank
- Trick candles
- Trigger Happy TV
- Tube Bar prank calls
- Tickling

=== U ===
- Kazuo Uzuki

=== V ===
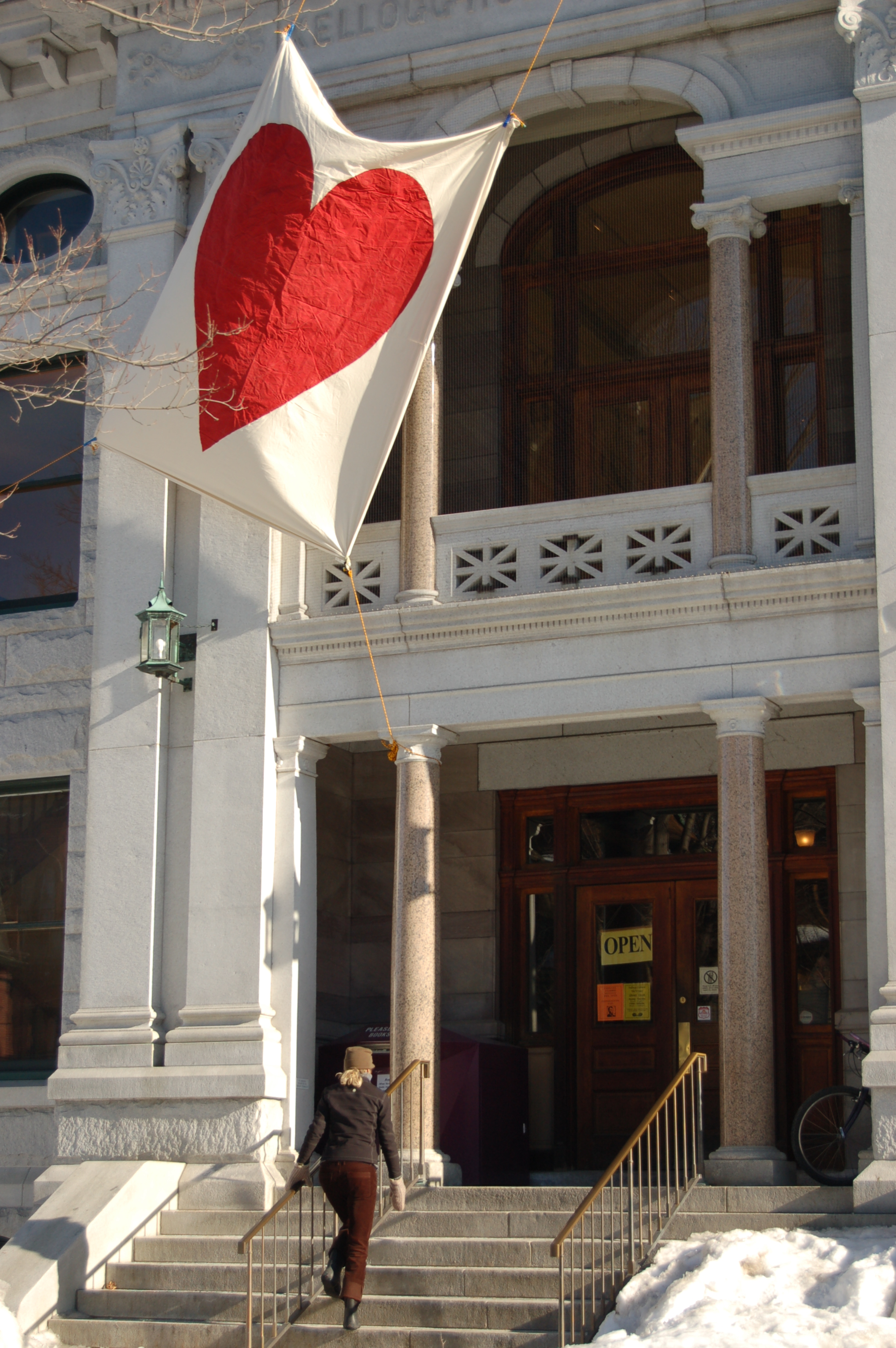
Valentine Phantom

- Valentine Phantom

=== W ===
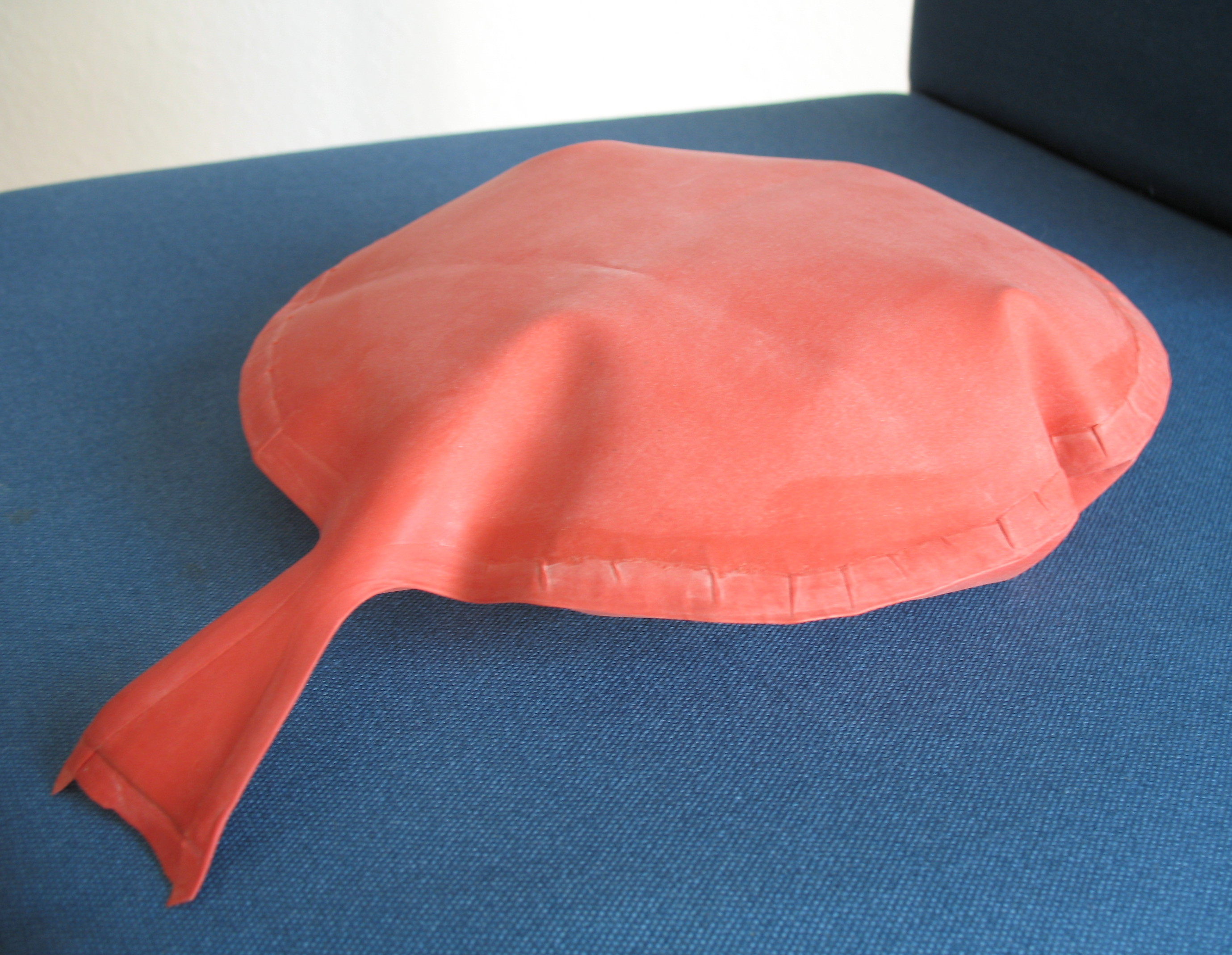
Whoopee cushion

- Wedgie
- Wet willy
- Who Gets the Last Laugh? (TV series)
- Whoopee cushion
- Windy City Heat

=== X ===
- X-ray specs

=== Y ===
- The Yes Men

== See also ==
- Hoax
- List of slapstick comedy topics
- Novelty item
- Pun
- Slapstick
- Surreal humour
- Visual gag
