= Military humor =

Humor based on military life stereotypes

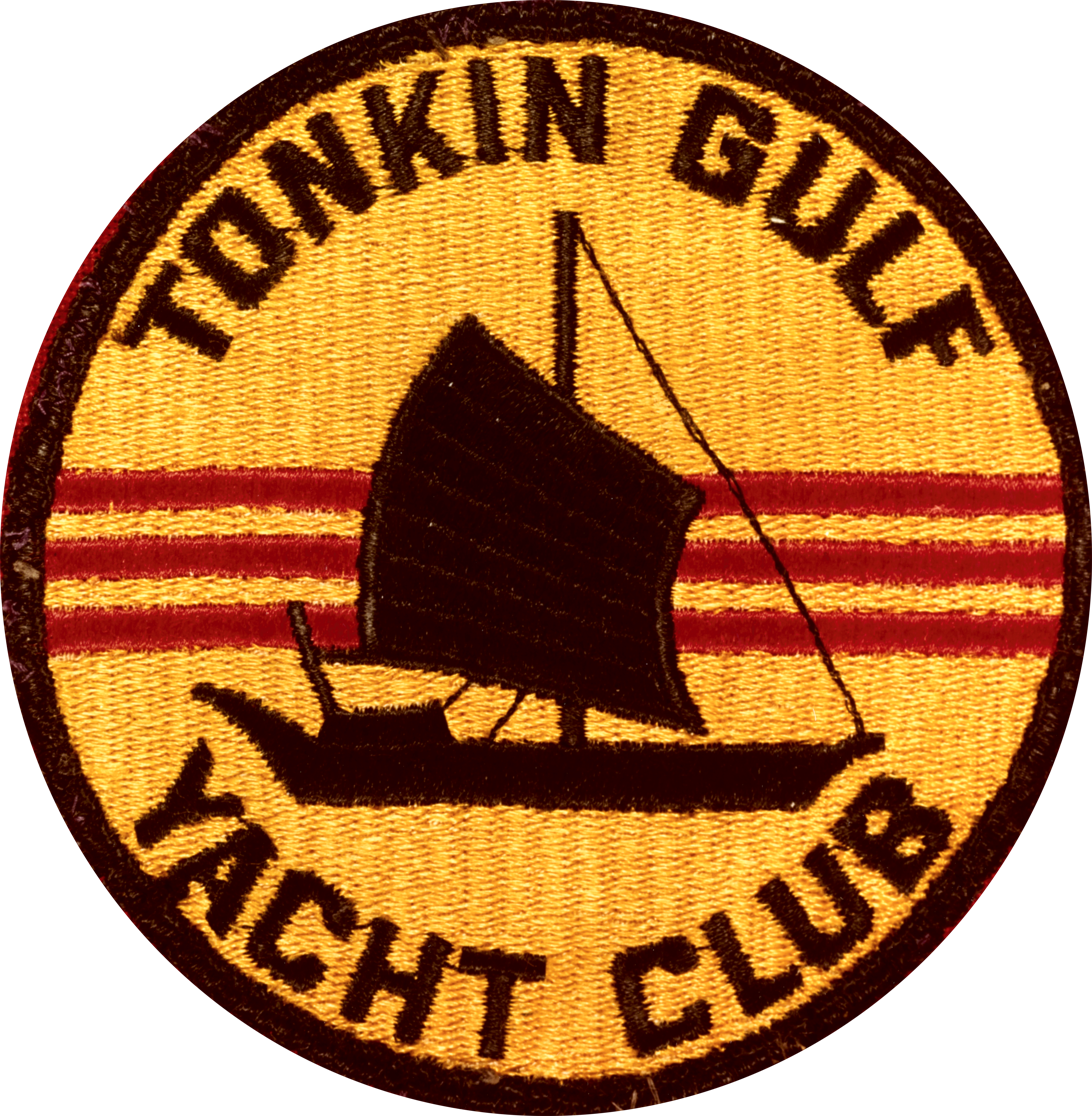
Military humor: Badge of the Tonkin Gulf Yacht Club (aka US 7th Fleet)

Military humor is humor based on stereotypes of military life. Military humor portrays a wide range of characters and situations in the armed forces. It comes in a wide array of cultures and tastes, making use of burlesque, cartoons, comic strips, double entendre, exaggeration, jokes, parody, gallows humor, pranks, ridicule and sarcasm.

Military humor often comes in the form of military jokes or "barracks jokes". Military slang, in any language, is also full of humorous expressions; the term "fart sack" is military slang for a sleeping bag. Barrack humor also often makes use of dysphemism, such as the widespread usage of "shit on a shingle" for chipped beef. Certain military expressions, like friendly fire, are a frequent source of satirical humor.

Notable cartoonists of military humor include Bill Mauldin, Dave Breger, George Baker, Shel Silverstein and Vernon Grant.

== Military jokes ==
- Military jokes might be sometimes quite blunt. For example, British soldiers during World War I joked that the DSO (Distinguished Service Order) military decoration was an abbreviation for "dick shot off".
- In other jokes however, the lack of seriousness is more subtle. Often these are in-jokes and not everyone understands them; e.g., the following reference to "Camouflage Uniform Wear Policies":
  - Marines: Work uniform, to be worn only during training and in field situations.
  - Army: Will wear it anytime, anywhere.
  - Navy: Will not wear camouflage uniforms, they do not camouflage you on a ship. (Ship Captains will make every effort to attempt to explain this to sailors.)
  - Air Force: Will defeat the purpose of camouflage uniforms by putting blue and silver chevrons and colorful squadron patches all over them.
- Cadences often contain humorous lyrics, or can be modified to be humorous. Examples:
  - My girl's got big ol' hips / Just like two battleships...
  - They say that in the Army, the biscuits are mighty fine / One rolled off the table, and killed a friend of mine...
- Sometimes the joke is made by civilians about the military. In the Philippines during Dictator Ferdinand Marcos martial law years, Chief of the Armed Forces General Fabian Ver was a feared figure. In the midst of the tense times, Filipino people used to joke that the general was so fiercely loyal that if Marcos would have ordered him to jump out of the window, General Ver would have saluted and said, "Which floor, sir?"

== Comic strips ==
The best-known comic strip about military life is Mort Walker's long-run Beetle Bailey, set in a United States Army military post where a number of inept characters are stationed. Also notable are George Baker's Sad Sack and Dave Breger's Private Breger. When Roy Crane created the Buz Sawyer Sunday strip, he put the emphasis not on Sawyer but on his comedic sidekick Sweeney. Half Hitch, Hank Ketcham's strip of Navy humor, was distributed by King Features Syndicate from 1970 to 1975. Maximillian Uriarte's Terminal Lance began in 2010 and continues to run online and in the Marine Corps Times.

Military humor in comic books includes the All Select Comics comic book feature "Jeep Jones" by Chic Stone.

== Films ==
Among the oldest military comedies in film are the Flagg and Quirt films. Comedy films about World War II include Buck Privates (1941), Stalag 17 (1953), Mr. Roberts (1955), Kelly's Heroes (1970) and Catch-22 (1970). The film Forrest Gump (1994) offers a glimpse of military humor when portraying Gump as a soldier in training and later fighting in Vietnam.

== Television ==
Some comedies, like the Don't Call Me Charlie! (1962–63) TV series (about a young veterinarian drafted into the Army and stationed in Paris), are totally devoted to the military theme. The fourth series of the British sitcom Blackadder, known as Blackadder Goes Forth, revolves around the life of Edmund Blackadder in the trenches of World War I.

== Books ==
Ballantine Books published Shel Silverstein's 1956 collection of cartoons from Pacific Stars and Stripes.

Notable books include Shel Silverstein's Grab Your Socks (1956), Jaroslav Hašek's The Good Soldier Švejk (1923) and Catch-22 by Joseph Heller. Reader's Digest's Humor in Uniform (1963) is a collection of short true anecdotes depicting amusing experiences in the armed forces. In 1941, according to editor Harold Hersey, there were about 350 Army camp newspapers. Three years later, when they had expanded to "hundreds and hundreds", he compiled his collection of camp newspapers cartoons, More G.I. Laughs (1944).

In 2002, Hyperion published Kilroy Was Here: The Best American Humor from World War II by Charles Osgood. Publishers Weekly reviewed:

Originating as a chalked inspection notice in a Quincy, Mass., shipyard, the sketch of bald-headed Kilroy launched a thousand ships and eventually became the most familiar globe-trotting graffiti of World War II... Osgood has assembled a barrage of WWII's amusing essays, stories, jokes, cartoons, poems and short satires. Selections range from heavy artillery (Reader's Digest's "Humor in Uniform" and Bob Hope's I Was There) to the small-arms fire of lesser-known writers. The opening salvo, "A Dictionary of Military Slang: 1941-1944" (compiled from Harold Hersey's More G.I. Laughs and Paris Kendall's Gone with the Draft), is followed by a parade of thematic chapters. Drinking from the same canteens, Osgood repeatedly excerpts from the same handful of mid-1940s publications. Oddly, he ignores the great Dave Breger of the Army weekly Yank, who coined the term G.I. Joe for a cartoon series so popular it ran simultaneously in that outlet and in American newspapers. Osgood offers a half-dozen of Bill Mauldin's famed Willie and Joe cartoons but only a single George Baker Sad Sack strip and one cartoon by the stylish Irwin Caplan, a prolific contributor to the slick postwar magazines.

== Magazines ==
Widely circulated on military bases during the 1950s, Charley Jones Laugh Book was an outgrowth of earlier military humor publications. During World War II, Jones sold Latrine Gazette on Army bases, so successful that he recycled the material into another publication, HEADliners, aimed at Navy men, and then launched Charley Jones Laugh Book as a nationally distributed magazine in 1943. Captain Billy's Whiz Bang began in a similar fashion after World War I.

== Humour in the former South African Defence Force ==
Military humour in the South African Defence Force (SADF) was to be found less in jokes than in humorous expressions and comments. It is sometimes difficult to express their force, since most of it is in Afrikaans, and the play on words does not always translate into English without explanation. SADF humour can be very vulgar, but is never blasphemous. It often comes from the mouths of Instructor Corporals addressing trainees:

- ”Moenie vir my loer nie, ek is nie 'n hoer nie!” (rhyming) – “Don't look at me (like that), I'm not a whore!”
- ”As my vrou net kon sien hoe jy my aankyk, sou sy jou oë uitkrap!” – “If my wife could only see you looking at me like that, she'd scratch your eyes out!”
- ”As jy so stadig fok as wat jy aantrek, sal jy nooit pa word nie!” – “If you fuck as slowly as you dress, you'll never become a father!” (To a conscript who fell in late for early morning PT).
- ”Ek sal jou oog uitsuig en dit voor jou uitspoeg sodat jy self kan sien watse groot poes is jy!” – “I'll suck out your eye and spit it out in front of you so that you can see for yourself what a great cunt you are!”

Plays on words were also popular, for example:

- “Kaptein” (Captain) became “Kaktein” which translated neatly into English as “Craptain.”
- A 2nd Lieutenant, who wore one pip on each shoulder and was usually a National Serviceman, was known as a “plastic pip (pp).”
- In Pretoria, there is a street called “Proes Straat”, where a number of important military buildings were located. “Proes” means to splutter in Afrikaans, but if the “r” is removed the resulting word is the Afrikaans equivalent of the American slang “pussy”. Thus Proes Straat was jokingly referred to in English as “Crunt Street”.
- Soldiers on permanent light duty, classified G3 or G4, were known as “Siekes, lammes en dooies” ("Sick, lame and dead ones”) or “Ligte vrugte” ("Light fruit"). This last expression is rhyming. It is a twisting of "light duty" in Afrikaans. Apart from the "light" allusion, it has no actual significant meaning.

Like any other army, there were also standard slang terms for equipment and uniforms:

- The large duffle-type bag in which a soldier carried his kit was known as a “balsak” (ball-bag);
- A knife, fork and spoon-set was dubbed a “pikstel” (pecking-set – army meal portions could be quite small during Basic Training);
- A ”pisvel” (lit. “pissing skin”) was a mattress cover;
- “Skrapnel” (shrapnel) referred to overboiled, diced frozen vegetables;
- "Ballas bak" (lit. “baking balls”) referred to sun-tanning during periods of inactivity on the SWA/Namibia Border;
- A “pislelie” was a broad, funnel-shaped tube set into the ground for urinating, on the same Border;
- A “go-kart” was a portable toilet seat with a lid, also for the Border. Anything up to ten were placed in double rows within a single, hessian surrounded enclosure with no individual privacy, hence the reference to go-kart races.

The various corps had humorously insulting names for each other. Amongst others:

- “Vleisbomme” (meat bombs) were paratroopers;
- "Kanondonkies" (cannon donkeys) were the Artillery;
- "Bebliksemde donkies" (lightning-struck, i.e. crazy, donkeys) referred to the Technical Services Corps, whose badge was a rearing silver stallion in front of a golden lightning bolt;
- Infantry wore a golden Springbok head on their berets. This led them to be called "bokkop" (buckhead), a not too subtle reference to the Afrikaans word "fokop" ("fuck-up");
- The Air Force were known as "budgies" after their eagle symbol;
- The Administrative Services Corps (ASC) was the Administratiewe Dienskorps in Afrikaans. Its abbreviation, ADK, gave rise to the nickname "Altyd Deur die Kak" ("Always in the shit");
- Later, when the ASC was split up and its beret colour changed from blue to an odd yellowish brown, the new colour was described as "kapoen", a telescoping of the Afrikaans words "kak" and "pampoen" (shit and pumpkin).

There were also soft-covered cartoon books satirizing army life. An example is one based on the old SADF adage, “There are only two sizes in the SADF; too big and too small.” It shows a squad of new recruits, all wearing uniforms and boots far too big or small. In the middle is a soldier with perfectly fitting gear. The Corporal is shouting at him: “What’s the matter with you, soldier? How come everything fits so perfectly?”

== Brazil in World War II ==

The Brazilian dictatorship of Getúlio Vargas was known for its unwillingness to get more deeply involved in the Allied war effort. By early 1943 a popular saying was: "It's more likely for a snake to smoke a pipe, than for the BEF to go the front and fight." ("Mais fácil uma cobra fumar um cachimbo, do que a FEB embarcar para o combate."). Before the FEB entered combat, the expression "a cobra vai fumar" ("the snake will smoke") was often used in Brazil in a context similar to "when pigs fly". As a result, the soldiers of the FEB called themselves Cobras Fumantes (literally, Smoking Snakes) and wore a divisional shoulder patch that showed a snake smoking a pipe. It was also common for Brazilian soldiers to write on their mortars, "The Snake is smoking ..." ("A cobra está fumando..."). After the war the meaning was reversed, signifying that something will definitively happen and in a furious and aggressive way. With that second meaning the use of the expression "a cobra vai fumar" has been retained in Brazilian Portuguese until the present, although few of the younger generations realize the origin of the expression.

== See also ==
- The 7 Ps
- Fawcett Publications
- Grande Armée slang
- No Time for Sergeants
- Oxymoron
- Russian jokes (section Russian military jokes)
- Republic of Korea Air Force (section Military ranks)
- Saluting trap
- Sergeant Bilko
- Wipers Times
