= X-Ray Specs (disambiguation) =

X-ray specs are a type of novelty eyewear, purported to allow the user to see through or into solid objects.

X-Ray Specs may also refer to:

- X-Ray Specs (comic strip), a UK comic strip
- "X-Ray Specs", a 1991 song by Sweet

== See also ==
- X-Ray Spex, an English punk band
