= Senior prank =

Organized prank by a school's senior class

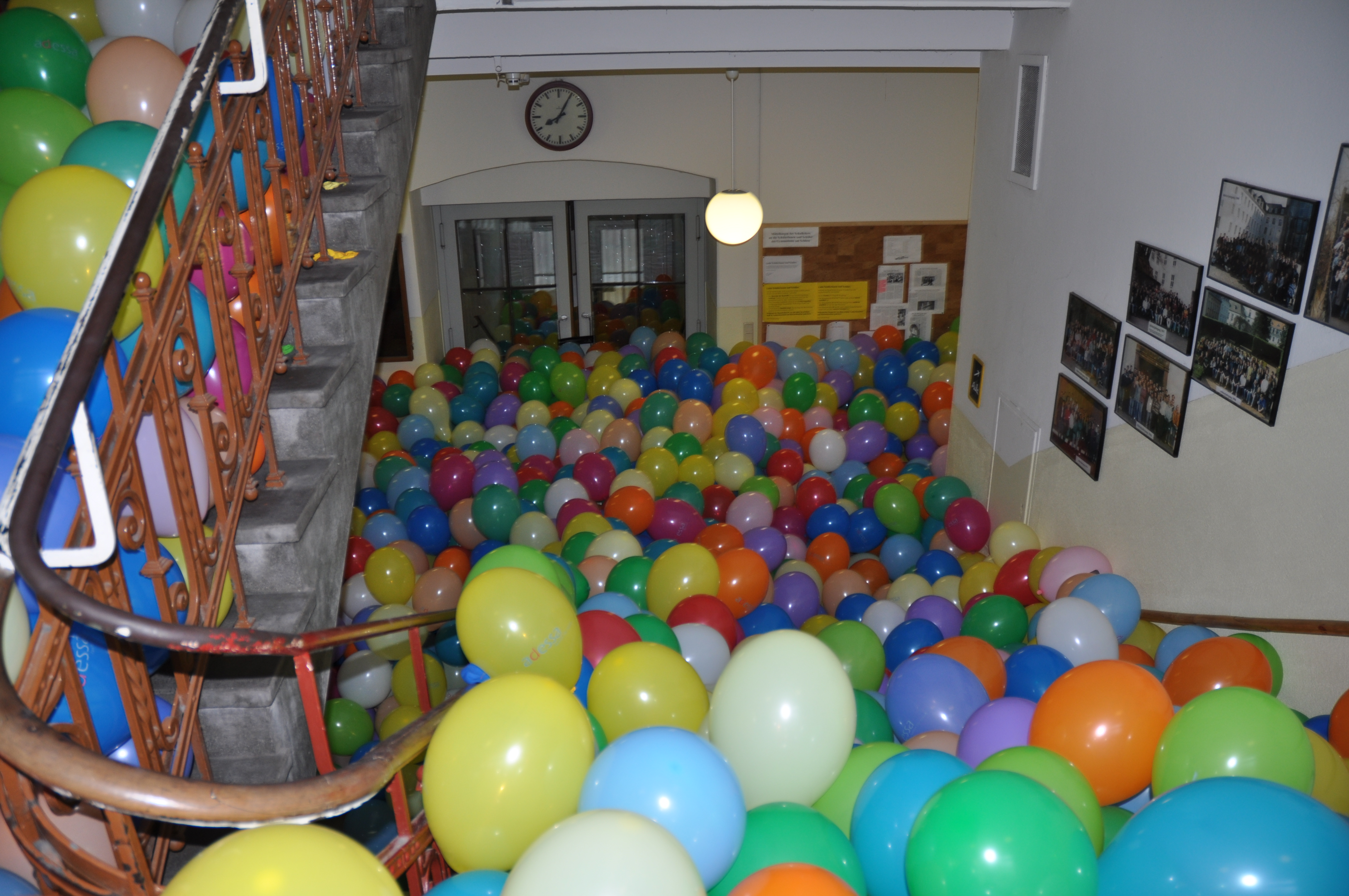
A stairwell filled with balloons at a Gymnasium in Saarbrücken, Germany

A senior prank, also known as muck-up day in Australia and the United Kingdom, is a type of organized prank by the senior class of a school, college, or university. They are often carried out at or near the end of the academic year and are part of school traditions. While most senior pranks are harmless, more severe pranks can include damage to school property and other crimes, which can result in disciplinary or even legal repercussions against the perpetrators.

== Common pranks ==
Common senior pranks include but are not limited to:

- Adopting unusual or fancy dress, especially at schools with strict uniform policies
- Using water pistols, stink bombs, water balloons, or shaving cream on each other or on teachers
- Issuing fake announcements over the public address system
- Starting barbecues in unusual places
- Imposing parking levies on the staff car park
- Issuing staff with detentions or uniform infringements
- Putting small polystyrene balls in the air conditioning, thus making it 'snow' in the building
- Chalk graffiti
- Filling elevators with hay or spreading bird seed in the staff parking lot to attract birds that then deconstruct the cars
- Setting up tents and making it appear that the seniors had camped overnight on school grounds
- Having a party in a faculty/underclassmen parking lot to confuse the parking situation
- Toilet papering the school or power lines around the school
- Changing the sound that the school bell makes after each period

== Responses ==
Incidents such as graffiti, vandalism or harming other students are dealt with in a number of ways, as the students despite finishing school have not yet graduated and, in the case of students enrolled in academic subjects, have yet to sit their exams. In extreme cases, or those involving non-students who turn up on the day, the police may be called. Some schools announce a day off for the rest of the school, while others conduct an assembly to formally farewell the final-year students during the day's events.

== By region ==
=== United States ===
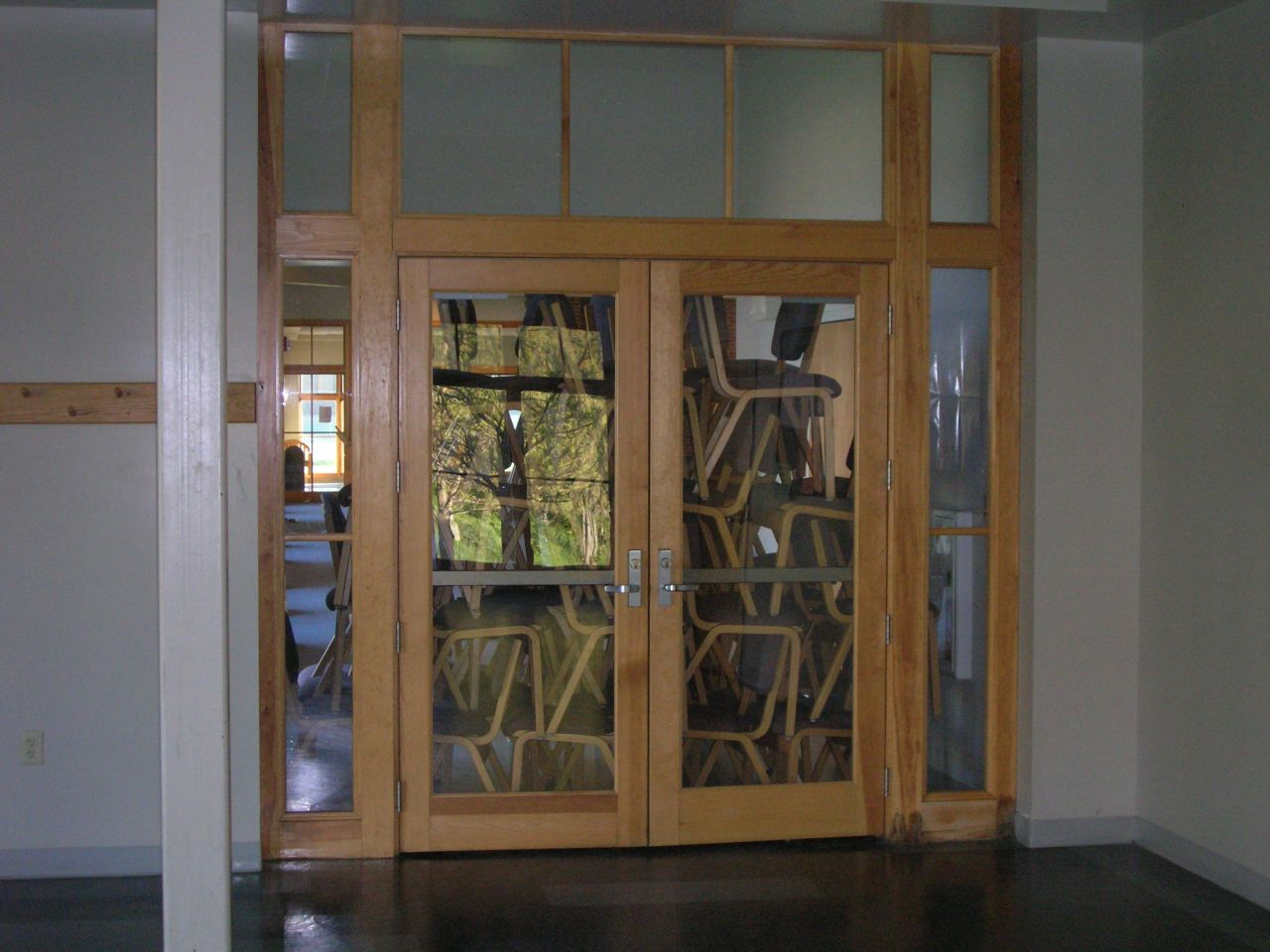
Part of a senior prank at a school in New Hampshire, in which several doorways were blocked with chairs

The practice has been banned within some schools in the United States, and replaced with formal leaving activities to ensure students do not commit crimes or vandalize school or other property.

=== United Kingdom ===
In the United Kingdom, muck-up days are common in private schools and state schools, and members of staff (particularly grounds staff and porters) often unofficially assist the perpetrators. Examples of such traditions include stealing the school's clocks as makeshift trophies or removing styluses for interactive whiteboards.

=== Australia ===
In Australia, muck-up days are a common practice in many schools, although their nature has evolved over the years such that activities are usually pre-approved by staff (e.g., a year coordinator) and may not harm staff, students or property. At Scotch College in Perth, the Year 12 boys' valedictory dinner was cancelled by the school after some students vandalised and ran partially naked through two nearby girls' schools.

== See also ==
- Capping stunt
- Practical joke
  - List of practical joke topics
- Skip Day
- Student prank
