= Hot foot =

Prank involving fire near the victim's foot

The hot foot is a prank where the prankster sets the victim's shoelaces or shoe on fire with a match or lighter.

There are several other versions of the hot foot prank, but all involve using a source of flame near a victim's foot. Other versions of the prank involve using a cigarette on the victim's heel, placing a lit match between two bare toes on the victim, or sticking a book of matches to the victim's shoe with gum and lighting the matches.

The hot foot prank is mentioned in several baseball stories as a prank that players play on one another. Bert Blyleven earned the nickname "Frying Dutchman" because of his love of this prank; during Blyleven's time with the Angels, the fire extinguisher in the Angel Stadium clubhouse featured a sign that said "In case of Blyleven: Pull."

Former relief pitcher and pitching coach Roger McDowell was also known for the prank. During his time with the New York Mets, he was featured in a segment of the team's 1986 World Series championship video in which he and teammate Howard Johnson demonstrate how to do it.

== See also ==
- List of practical joke topics
