= Alhokm Baad Almozawla =

- Genre: Comedy reality
- Created by: Haytham al-Feel
- Starring: Iman Mubarak
- Country of origin: Egypt
- Original language: Arabic
- No. of episodes: 95

Original release
- Network: Al Nahar
- Release: 2012 – 2012

Alhokm Baad Almozawla (Arabic:الحكم بعد المزاولة) (variously translated as "Judgment After a Prank", "Judgement after Deliberations" and "The Verdict After Judgment") is a popular Egyptian hidden camera/practical joke reality television series. On the show, unsuspecting celebrities are under the pretense that they are being interviewed for an Arabic-speaking German TV network. They are asked about their views on Israel, and then told they are on Israeli TV, provoking a range of reactions.

== See also ==
- List of practical joke topics
