= Keel laying =

Formal recognition of the start of a ship's construction

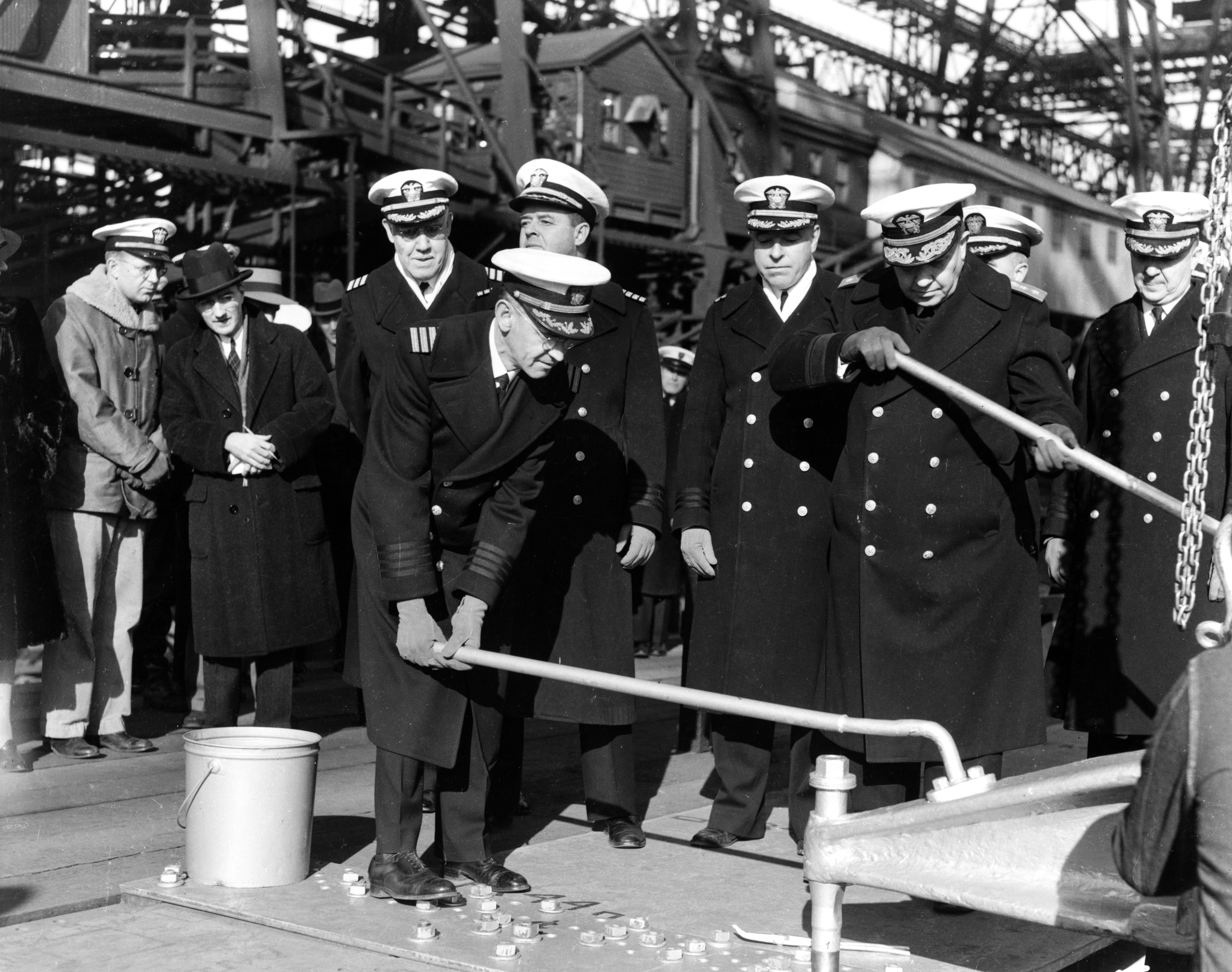
Driving the first or "golden" rivet during USS Missouri's keel laying, 1941

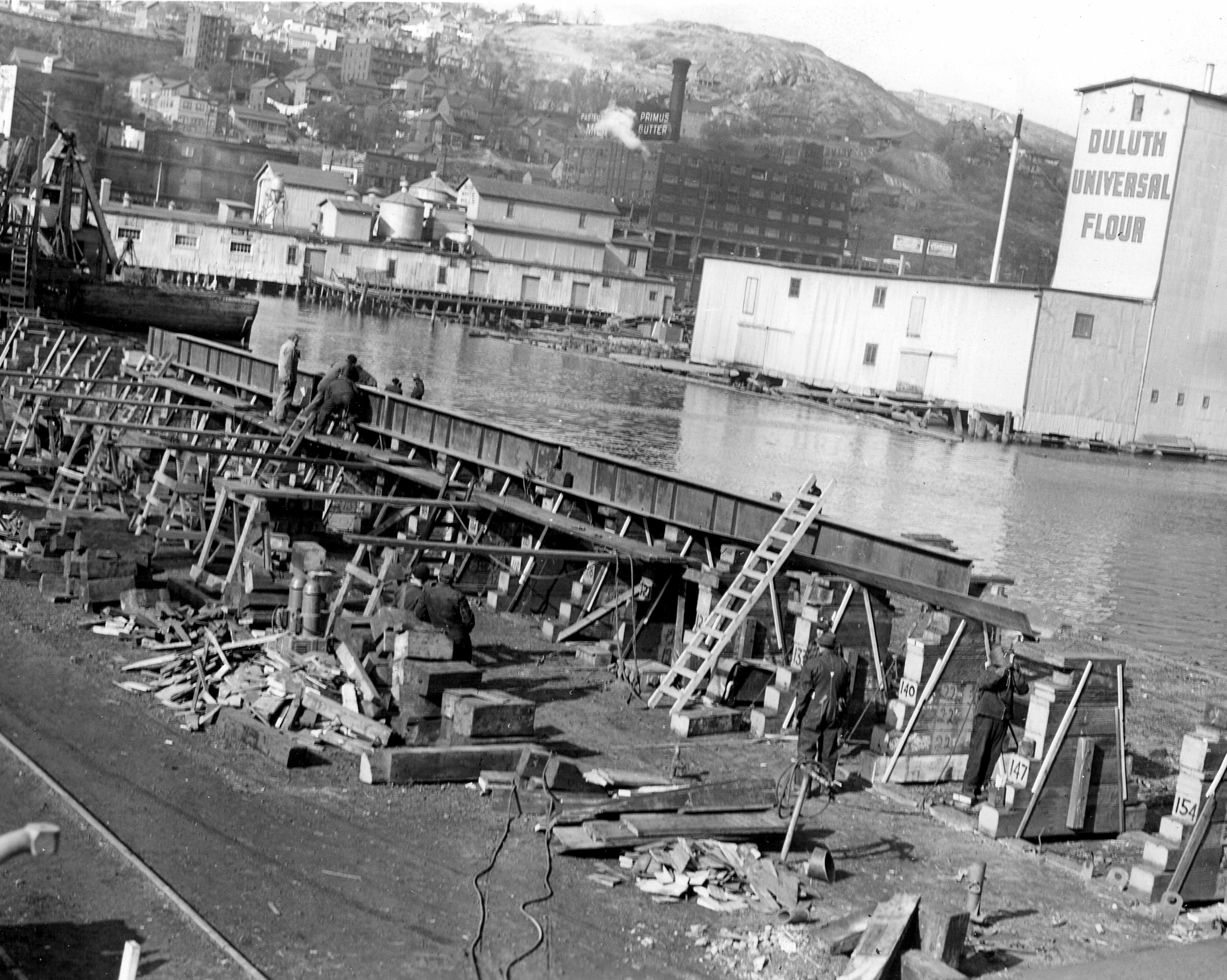
Laying of the keel of USCGC Mariposa (WLB-397) in 1943

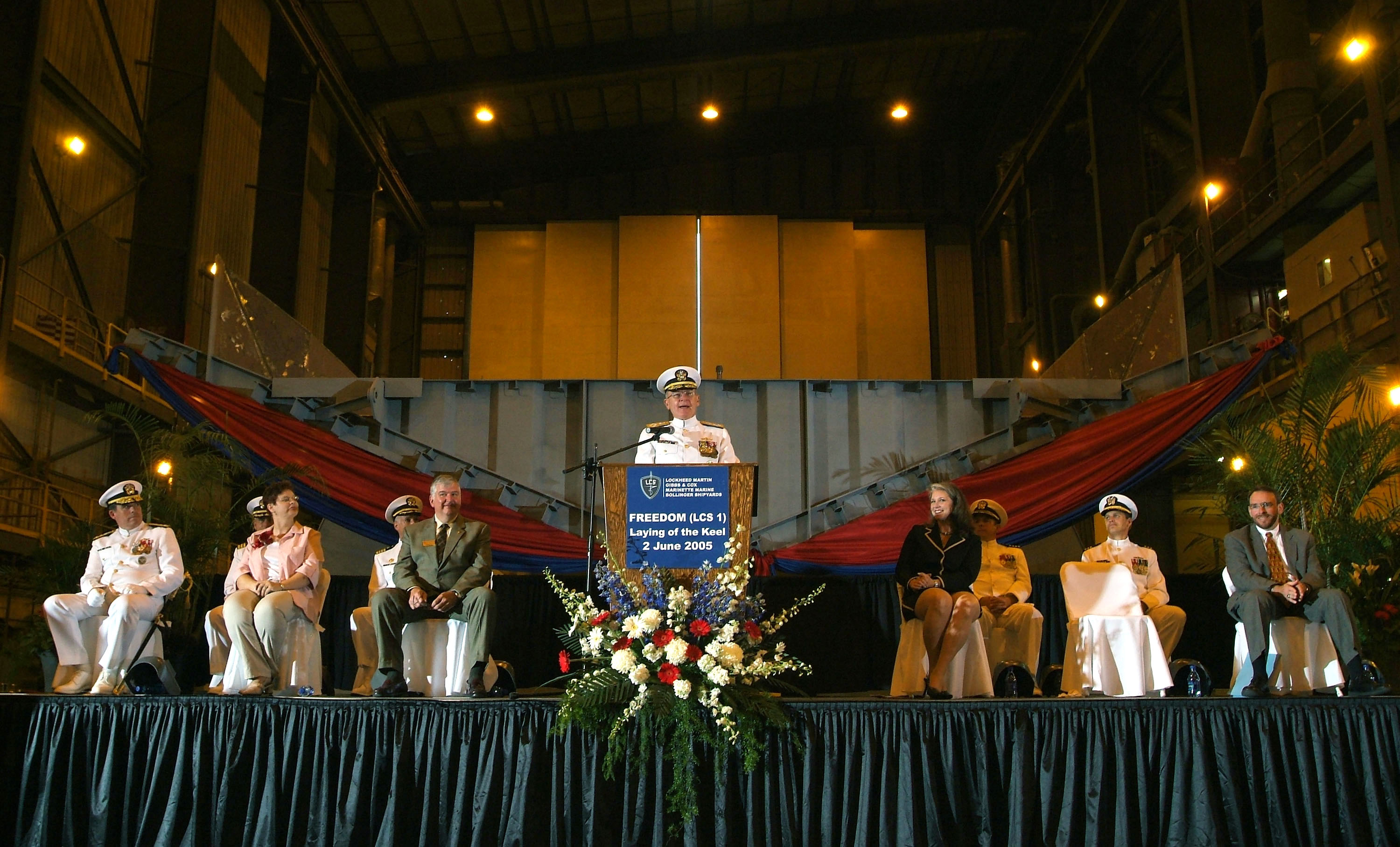
Keel laying ceremony for USS Freedom (LCS-1), 2005. Note the pre-fabricated module in the background.

Laying the keel or laying down is the formal recognition of the start of a ship's construction. It is often marked with a ceremony attended by dignitaries from the shipbuilding company and the ultimate owners of the ship.

Keel laying is one of the four specially celebrated events in a ship's life; the others are launching, commissioning, and decommissioning.

Earlier, the event recognized as the keel laying was the initial placement of the central timber making up the backbone of a vessel, called the keel. As steel ships replaced wooden ones, the central timber gave way to a central steel beam.

Modern ships are most commonly built in a series of pre-fabricated, complete hull sections rather than around a single keel. The event recognized as the keel laying is the first joining of modular components, or the lowering of the first module into place in the building dock. It is now often called "keel authentication" and is the ceremonial beginning of the ship's life, although some modules may have been started months before that stage of construction.

== Traditions ==
Keel-related traditions from the times of wooden ships are said to bring luck to the ship during construction and to the captain and crew during her later life. They include placing a newly minted coin under the keel and constructing the ship over it, having the youngest apprentice place the coin, and, when the ship is finished, presenting the owners with the oak block on which the keel is laid. The tradition of the placement of coins derives from the mast stepping custom of placing coins under the mast and is believed to date back to Ancient Greece or Ancient Rome and were intended to "pay the ferryman" to convey the souls of the dead across the River Styx should the ship sink.

== US Navy traditions ==
The first milestone in the history of a ship is the generally simple ceremony that marks the laying of the keel. Shipyard officials issue invitations to the ceremony, and they conduct the ceremony. The builder may be the commander of a naval shipyard or the president of a private company. The ship's prospective name, without the "USS", is mentioned in the invitation, if known; otherwise, her type and number are given, e.g., DD 2217. For submarines, they do not have a keel to be laid; instead, the initials of the ship sponsor are welded on a steel plate during the ceremony. The plate will be mounted in a place of honor on the submarine once built.
