= Bingo Shooting Device =

Small mousetrap-like device

The Bingo Shooting Device is a small mousetrap-like device used in novelty pranks and magic tricks. The device, invented by Sam S. Adams for S.S. Adams Novelties in 1907, consists of a hinge that is closed over a spring-loaded hammer. When the hinge is allowed to open, the hammer is released and strikes a percussion cap, causing a loud bang. The mechanism has been adapted to many prank items, including pens that explode when the cap is removed and toilet seats that explode when raised.
