= Half Hitch (comic strip) =

Comic strip by Hank Ketcham

- Author(s): Hank Ketcham (1943–1945); Bob Saylor (1970–1975)
- Illustrator: Dick Hodgins (1970–1975)
- Current status/schedule: Concluded daily strip
- Launch date: 1943; February 16, 1970
- End date: 1945; 1975
- Syndicate(s): King Features Syndicate (1970–1975)
- Publisher: The Saturday Evening Post (1943–1945)
- Genre(s): Humor, Military

Half Hitch is an American comic strip by Hank Ketcham, in syndication first between 1943 and 1945 and later from 1970 to 1975. It is an example of military humor, but unlike most cartoons and comics of this genre, is focused on the navy, rather than the army. The unnamed character first appeared in The Saturday Evening Post in 1943.

During World War II, Hank Ketcham served in the U.S. Navy. During his service, he created a comic strip for the amusement of his fellow sailors, following the adventures of a short, lecherous sailor and his friends. It was published in The Saturday Evening Post where it became popular. The strip ceased in 1945, but after the great success of Dennis the Menace, Ketcham revived it as Half Hitch. The revival was distributed by King Features Syndicate, running from 1970 to 1975, as described by comics historian Don Markstein:

But in the late 1960s, when there once again was a soldier or a sailor in most families, King Features Syndicate started looking into something new, to tap into the popularity of its Beetle Bailey. Ketcham had proved his own drawing power with Dennis, so they decided on a revival of his diminutive sailor, dubbing him Half Hitch. The new version began as a daily and Sunday on Monday, February 16, 1970. Tho Ketcham's name went on it, this incarnation was written by Bob Saylor and drawn by Dick Hodgins, using a Ketchamesque style. Though King had had some success with pantomimes (e.g., Henry, The Little King), this time Hitch spoke. And so did everybody else in the strip, even a seagull named Poopsy, tho the latter didn't seem interested in talking with anybody but Hitch. The title character was no longer as hapless as before, but he still did many traditional sailor-like things, such as having a girl in every port.

The strip's main character, Half Hitch, is short, rather lazy, and intensely interested in the pursuit of women. Other characters include the ship's stern captain, various NCOs and sailors, and Poopsy, Hitch's pet seagull. Poopsy spun out into his own strip in 1974.
