= Trick candle =

Self-relighting candle

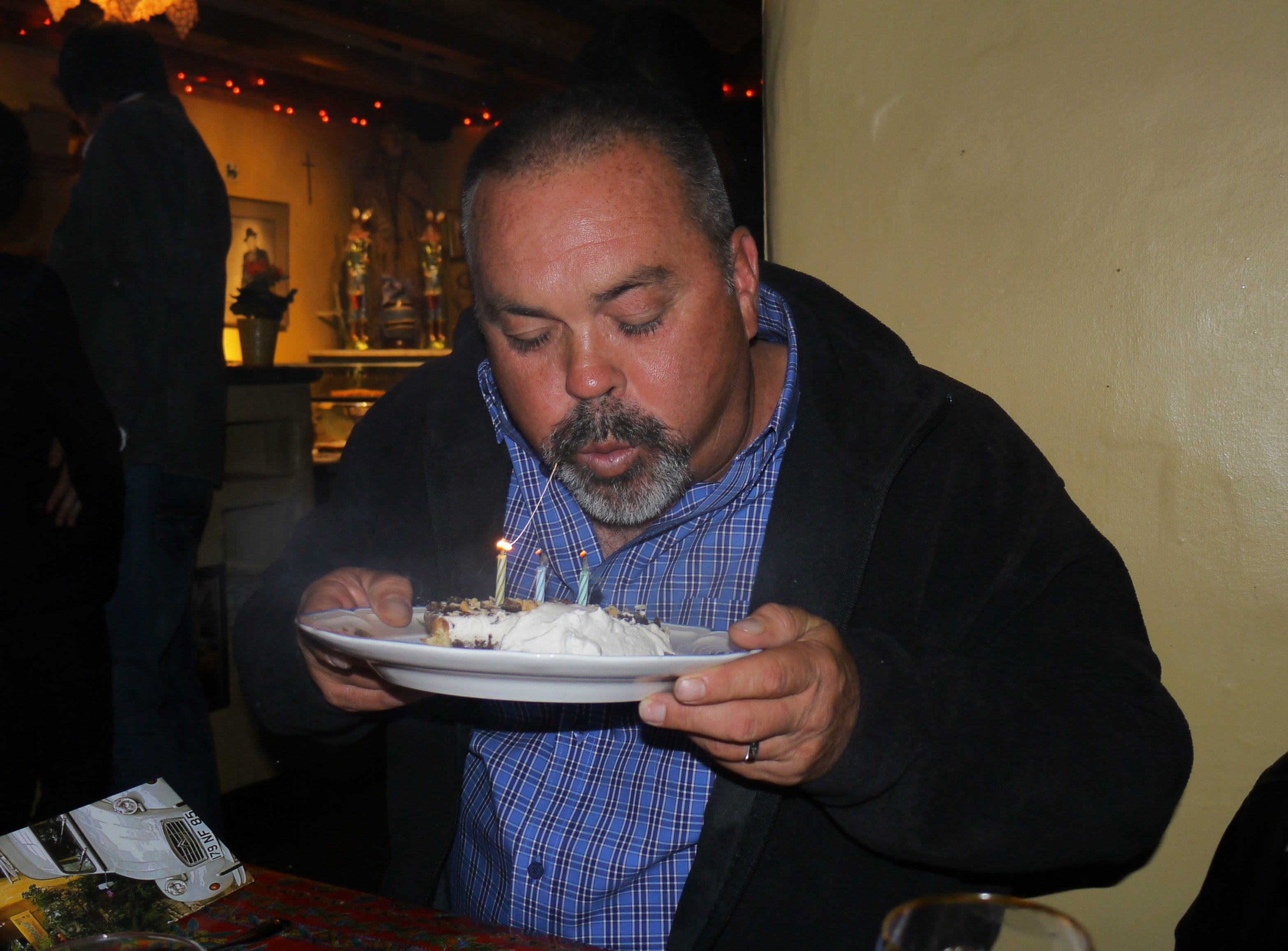
A man attempting to blow out trick candles on a cake

A trick candle, also known as magic candle, is a novelty candle capable of relighting itself. By igniting magnesium inserted in the wick of the candle, the paraffin vapor emitted when a candle is blown out can be set alight, allowing the candle to reignite.

Trick candles were banned in Canada in 1977. They present a fire risk in that consumers may discard them believing they are extinguished, only for the candles to relight. A spokesperson for the National Candle Association recommends immersing the candles in water for a while before discarding them.

== See also ==
- List of practical joke topics
