= Monster Fun =

British children's magazine

Monster Fun (IPC)
- Monster Fun #1 (14 June 1975)

Publication information
- Publisher: IPC Magazines Ltd
- Schedule: Weekly
- Genre: Action/adventure, horror, humor/comedy
- Publication date: 14 June 1975 – 30 October 1976
- No. of issues: 73 regular issues 2 summer specials

Creative team
- Artist(s): Robert Nixon, Thomas Williams, Trevor Metcalfe, Mike Lacey, Ken Reid
- Editor: "Frankie Stein"

Monster Fun (Rebellion)

Publication information
- Publisher: Rebellion Publishing
- Schedule: Bi-Monthly (April 2022-April 2023); Monthly (from June 2023)
- Genre: Action/adventure, horror, humor/comedy
- Publication date: 06 April 2022 – December 2024
- No. of issues: 26
- Editor: "Frankie Stein"

Monster Fun was originally a weekly British comic strip magazine for children aged seven to twelve. Published by IPC Media, it ran for 73 issues in 1975–1976, when it merged with Buster. Focused on humorous monster strips and stories, the magazine was known for "The Bad Time Bedtime Books" minicomic inserts, created by Leo Baxendale.

The nominal editor was "Frankie Stein" (a play on Frankenstein), a character who had previously appeared in the magazines Wham!, Shiver and Shake, and Whoopee!. Recurring artists included Robert Nixon, Thomas Williams, and Trevor Metcalfe.

The magazine was known for handing out free toys in its issues. The first issue, for instance, came with a free plate wobbler (a novelty item consisting of an inflatable rubber bladder and a hand-operated pump; the bladder is placed under a plate, and inflating it makes the plate wobble). The second issue had a "Freaky Spider Ring", the third a "Super Shaking Skeleton".

The comic was relaunched in April 2022, initially as a bi-monthly publication before moving to monthly publication. Its final issue was in December 2024.

== Publication history ==
=== Original IPC Run ===
Monster Fun's debut issue was dated 14 June 1975. Monster Fun Specials were printed in 1975 and 1976.

The magazine merged with Buster to form Buster and Monster Fun after the 30 October 1976 issue. Due to its ongoing popularity, the Monster Fun logo was printed on Buster's cover until the summer of 1979.

Despite its short run, Monster Fun Annuals were printed every year, cover-dated from 1977 until 1985, though all contained some reprint material. They were all distributed in the UK from the autumn of the previous cover-dated year. Buster and Monster Fun Specials were printed (with much reprint material) every year from 1977 until 1996, making them one of the most long-lived of IPC / Fleetway titles. Almost all of the other original strips were reprinted in other titles in the 1980s and 1990s.

After Monster Fun's 1976 merger into Buster, the strips Gums, Kid Kong, X-Ray Specs, Mummy's Boy, Draculass, Teddy Scare, Terror TV, and Martha's Monster Make-Up all made the merger.

In February 1982 these merged magazines merged again with Jackpot. Kid Kong was terminated on this occasion.

In June 1984 the magazine merged with School Fun. The comic strip Gums was terminated on this occasion.

In 1988 the magazine merged with Nipper. Mummy's Boy was terminated on this occasion. X-Ray Specs had the most longevity continuing until Buster's end (4 January 2000) though as with the all but one of the last Buster strips as reprints.

=== Rebellion revival (2021-2024) ===
In September 2021 it was announced that Rebellion, publishers of 2000 AD, would be relaunching the comic in April 2022, "revived and reimagined for today's kids".

Unlike the original IPC run, the Rebellion revival will be published every two months, rather than weekly. Characters who will appear within the comics include Frankie Stein, Kid Kong, Draculass, Sweeny Toddler, Gums, Teddy Scare, and The Leopard from Lime Street. The first issue in October 2021 was not part of the main sequence, as the publication's main subscription started from April 2022.

In March 2023, Rebellion announced that from June 2023, due to popular demand, the issues will be published monthly rather than every two months.

In November 2024, Rebellion announced that the December issue of the comic would be the final one (despite solicitations for issues 27 and 28 being published in Diamond Previews).

Trade paperbacks collecting the stories continued to be published in 2025 and 2026.

==== Issues ====
- Monster Fun Halloween Special issue ("Halloween Spooktacular") was published in October 2021. Included in this issue were Frankie Stein; Kid Kong; Draculass; Teddy Scare!; Gums; Sweeny Toddler; Harry & Gary; Evil Eye; Tokoloshe; Birdman, Chicken & Sparrow; Martha's Monster Make-Up; Hell's Angel; Gah! The Gobblin' Goblin; Wiz War; The Leopard from Lime Street; Hire a Horror; Jump Junior, Monster Helper; Creature Teacher; Scare Salon and Grimly Feendish.
1. "Easter Special 2022", released in April 2022 (cover date 6 April - 31 May 2022). Included in this issue were Kid Kong, Steel Commando, Frankie Stein, Draculass, a stand-alone story The Story of Easter, Hire a Horror, Martha's Monster Make-Up, The Leopard from Lime Street and Hell's Angel, as well as puzzles and reader-submitted art. A special, webstore-only edition, included an additional story (Sweeney Toddler).
2. "School's Out Special 2022", released in June 2022 (cover date 1 June - 2 August 2022). Included in this issue were Kid Kong, Steel Commando (continuing the story from issue 1), Frankie Stein, Draculass, a stand-alone story The Sun, Martha's Monster Make-Up, Hire a Horror, The Leopard from Lime Street (continuing the story from issue 1) and Hell's Angel, as well as puzzles and reader-submitted art.
3. "Summer Special 2022", released in August 2022 (cover date 3 August - 4 October 2022). Included in this issue were Kid Kong, Steel Commando (continuing the story from issue 2), Frankie Stein, Draculass, a stand-alone story Home Invaders, Martha's Monster Make-Up, Hire a Horror, The Leopard from Lime Street (continuing the story from issue 2) and Hell's Angel, as well as puzzles and reader-submitted art.
4. "Halloween Spooktacular 2022", released in October 2022 (cover date 05 Oct - 06 Dec 2022). Included in this issue were Kid Kong, Steel Commando (continuing the story from issue 3), Frankie Stein, Martha's Monster Make-Up, a stand-alone story The Stain, Hire a Horror, Draculass, The Leopard from Lime Street (continuing the story from issue 3), and Hell's Angel, as well as puzzles and reader-submitted art.
5. "Christmas Special 2022", released in December 2022 (cover date 07 Dec 2022 - 31 Jan 2023). Included in this issue were Kid Kong, The Spider Who Loved Me! (a story submitted by a reader in a competition, and scripted and illustrated by some of "Monster Fun"'s regular contributors), Steel Commando (continuing the story from issue 4), Frankie Stein, Draculass, a stand-alone story Clear and Present Danger, Hell's Angel, Martha's Monster Make-Up, Hire a Horror and The Leopard from Lime Street (continuing the story from issue 4), as well as puzzles and reader-submitted art.
6. "Ghoulish Gaming Special", released in February 2023 (cover date 01 Feb - 04 Apr 2023). Included in this issue were Gums, Kid Kong, Hell's Angel, Space Invaded! (part 1) (a new story for this publication), Steel Commando (continuing the story from issue 5), Martha's Monster Make-Up, Witch Vs Warlock (a new comic strip), Draculass, The Leopard from Lime Street (continuing the story from issue 5) and Hire a Horror, as well as puzzles and reader-submitted art.
7. "Twisted Time Travel Special", released in April 2023 (cover date 05 Apr - 06 Jun 2023). Included in this issue were Gums, Kid Kong, Hell's Angel, Space Invaded! (continuing the store from issue 6), Steel Commando (continuing the story from issue 6), Draculass, Witch Vs Warlock, The Leopard from Lime Street (continuing the story from issue 6) and Hire a Horror, as well as puzzles and reader-submitted art.
- "Spooky Subscriber Special", released in April 2023. This was an exclusive-to-subscribers, free, issue. The issue included 3 new stories (two Hell's Angel stories and one Martha's Monster Make-Up story), along with stories from previous issues (from the Halloween Spooktacular 2021 to the Halloween Spooktacular 2022, plus a Kid Kong story from the Cor!! Buster Humour Special, originally published in April 2019). These republished stories included in this issue were Kid Kong, Hire a Horror, Martha's Monster Make-Up, Draculass, Frankie Stein and Sweeny Toddler.
8. "Dino-Scare Special", released in June 2023 (cover date 07 Jun - 04 Jul 2023). Included in this issue were Gums, Kid Kong, Hell's Angel, Space Invaded! (continuing the story from issue 7), Steel Commando (continuing the story from issue 7), Witch Vs Warlock, The Leopard from Lime Street (continuing the story from issue 7), a Global Ghoulies picture (in the style of Ken Reid) and Martha's Monster Make-Up, as well as puzzles and reader-submitted art.
9. "Horror Holiday Special", released in July 2023 (cover date 05 Jul - 01 Aug 2023). Included in this issue were Gums, Kid Kong, Hell's Angel, Space Invaded (continuing the story from issue 8), Steel Commando (continuing the story from issue 8), Martha's Monster Make-Up, Witch Vs Warlock, The Leopard from Lime Street (continuing the story from issue 8), Global Ghoulies and Hire a Horror, as well as puzzles and reader-submitted art.
10. "Petrifying Pets Special", released August 2023 (cover date 02 Aug - 05 Sep 2023). Included in this issue were Gums, Kid Kong, Hell's Angel, Space Invaded (continuing the story from issue 9), Steel Commando (continuing the story from issue 9), Martha's Monster Make-Up, Witch Vs Warlock, The Leopard from Lime Street (continuing the story from issue 9), Global Ghoulies and Frankencritter, as well as puzzles and reader-submitted art.
11. "Freaky Fairy Tales Special", released September 2023 (cover date 06 Sep - 03 Oct 2023). Included in this issue were Gums, Kid Kong, Hell's Angel, Space Invaded! (continuing the story from issue 10), Steel Commando (continuing the story from issue 10), Martha's Monster Make-Up, Witch Vs Warlock, The Leopard from Lime Street (continuing the story from issue 10 and concluding the story arc), Lost in the Woods (game), Global Ghoulies and Hire a Horror, as well as puzzles and reader-submitted art.
12. "Halloween Spooktacular 2023", released October 2023 (cover date 04 Oct - 31 Oct 2023). Included in this issue were Gums, Kid Kong, Hell's Angel, Space Invaded, Steel Commando (continuing the story from issue 11 and concluding the story arc), Draculass, Witch Vs Warlock, Crabbe's Crusaders (a new serial), Global Ghoulies, Franken Critter, Martha's Monster Make-Up, Hire a Horror and All Hallows Scream, as well as puzzles and reader-submitted art. (Note: from this issue, the issue number was shown along with the cover dates)
13. "Spooky Space!", released November 2023 (cover date 01 Nov - 05 Dec 2023). Included in this issue were Gums, Kid Kong, Hell's Angel, Space Invaded!, Draculass, Martha's Monster Make-Up, Witch Vs Warlock, Crabbe's Crusaders (continuing the story from issue 112 and concluding the story arc), Global Ghoulies andWelcome to Garzag's Galactic Guzzle-Pit!, as well as puzzles and reader-submitted art.
14. "Christmas Special 2023", released December 2023 (cover date 06 Dec 2023 - 02 Jan 2024). Included in this issue were Gums, Kid Kong, Hell's Angel, Space Invaded!, Peaches Creatures (a new strip), Martha's Monster Make-Up, Witch Vs Warlock, Rex Power (a new strip)), Global Ghoulies andFrankencritter, as well as puzzles and reader-submitted art.
15. "Monstrous Motors!", released January 2024 (cover date 03 Jan - 06 Feb 2024). Included in this issue were Gums, Kid Kong, Hell's Angel, Space Invaded!, Peaches Creatures (part 2, continuing from the last issue), Martha's Monster Make-Up, Witch Vs Warlock, Rex Power (Episode Two, continuing from the last issue), Global Ghoulies andHire a Horror, as well as puzzles and reader-submitted art.
16. "Manic Movies!", released February 2024 (cover date 07 Feb - 05 Mar 2024). Included in this issue were Gums, Kid Kong, Hell's Angel, Space Invaded!, Peaches Creatures (part 3, continuing from the last issue), Martha's Monster Make-Up, Witch Vs Warlock, Rex Power (Episode Three, continuing from the last issue), Global Ghoulies and Frankencritter, as well as puzzles and reader-submitted art.
17. "Beastly Books!", released March 2024 (cover date 06 Mar - 02 Apr 2024). Included in this issue were Gums, Kid Kong, Hell's Angel, Space Invaded!, Peaches Creatures (part 4, continuing from the last issue), Martha's Monster Make-Up, Witch Vs Warlock, Rex Power (Episode Four, continuing from the last issue), Global Ghoulies and new strip Molly's Mummy, as well as puzzles and reader-submitted art.
18. "Nasty Nature!", released April 2024 (cover date 02 Apr - 30 Apr 2024). Included in this issue were Gums, Kid Kong, Hell's Angel, Space Invaded!, Peaches Creatures (part 5, continuing from the last issue), Martha's Monster Make-Up/Draculass (the title for Martha is scribbled out with a piece of paper with the Draculass logo pasted over it), new strip Zorthrax the Unforgivable (a character from issue 13's Welcome to Garzag's Galactic Guzzle-Pit!), Rex Power (Episode Five, continuing from the last issue), Global Ghoulies and Frankencritter, as well as puzzles and reader-submitted art.
19. "Sinister Science!", released May 2024 (cover date 1 May - 04 June 2024). Included in this issue were Gums, Kid Kong, Hell's Angel, Forest of Fear (a new strip), Space Invaded!, Peaches Creatures (part 6, continuing from the last issue, concluding the current story arc. A note on the final panel says "Peaches' Creatures will return!"), Witch Vs Warlock, Rex Power (Episode Six, continuing from last issue), Global Ghoulies, Martha's Monster Make-Up, as well as puzzles and reader-submitted art.
20. "Magic and Mystery", released June 2024 (cover date 05 Jun - 02 Jul 2024). Included in this issue were Gums Kid Kong, Sally Astro (a new strip), Forest of Fear, Hire a Horror: The Fright Shift, Sir Render: The cowardly Knight (a new strip), Martha's Monster Make-Up, Witch Vs Warlock, Rex Power (Episode Seven) and Franken Critter, as well as puzzles and reader-submitted art.
21. "Superhero Monster", released July 2024 (cover date 03 Jul - 06 Aug 2024). Included in this issue were Gums Kid Kong, Sally Astro, Hire a Horror: The Fright Shift, Captain Zom (a new strip), Sir Render: The cowardly Knight, Witch Vs Warlock, Rex Power (Episode Eight), UniScorn (a new strip) and Martha's Monster Make-Up, as well as puzzles and reader-submitted art.
22. "Scary Sports", released August 2024 (cover date 07 Aug - 03 Sep 2024). Included in this issue were Gums Kid Kong, Sally Astro, Hire a Horror: The Fright Shift, Captain Zom, Sir Render: The cowardly Knight, Martha's Monster Make-Up, Witch Vs Warlock, Rex Power (Episode Nine), Forest of Fear and Franken Critter, as well as puzzles and reader-submitted art.
23. "Ghastly Gaming", released September 2024 (cover date 04 Sep - 01 Oct 2024). Included in this issue were Gums Kid Kong, Sally Astro, Hire a Horror: The Fright Shift, Captain Zom, Sir Render: The cowardly Knight, Martha's Monster Make-Up, Witch Vs Warlock, Rex Power (Episode Ten) and Pop Grrrl (a new strip), as well as puzzles and reader-submitted art.
24. "Halloween Spooktacular 2024", released October 2024 (cover date 02 Oct - 05 Nov 2024). Included in this issue were Gums Kid Kong, Sally Astro, Hire a Horror: The Fright Shift, Captain Zom, Sir Render: The cowardly Knight, Martha's Monster Make-Up, Peaches' Creatures, Witch Vs Warlock, Pop Grrrl, Is It You? (a new strip), Hell's Angel, Crabbe's Crusaders and Count Carrot as well as puzzles and reader-submitted art.
25. "Eerie Animals", released November 2024 (cover date 06 Nov - 03 Dec 2024). Included in this issue were Gums Kid Kong, Sally Astro, Hire a Horror: The Fright Shift, Captain Zom, Sir Render: The cowardly Knight, Martha's Monster Make-Up, Witch Vs Warlock, Crabbe's Crusaders and Pop Grrrl, as well as puzzles and reader-submitted art.
26. "Christmas Special", released December 2024 (cover date 04 - 31 Dec 2024). Included in this issue were Gums Kid Kong, Martha's Monster Make-Up, Sally Astro, Peaches' Creatures, Sir Render: The cowardly Knight, Witch Vs Warlock, Crabbe's Crusaders, Hire a Horror: The Fright Shift and Hells Angel, as well as puzzles and reader-submitted art.

Although issue 26 was the final issue, the contents for the next two issues had been solicited:

27. "Level Up", was to include Gums, Captain Zom, Witch Vs Warlock, Martha’s Monster Make Up, Sir Render, The Fright Shift, Crabbe’s Crusaders and Peaches’ Creatures.
28. "What a Knight-Mare!", was to include Gums, Captain Zom, Witch Vs Warlock, Martha’s Monster Make Up, Sir Render, The Fright Shift, Peaches’ Creatures and Crabbes’ Crusaders.

== List of strips ==
=== Original strips ===
- Arts Gallery (drawn by Mike Lacey)
- Brainy and his Monster Maker
- Cinders
- Creature Teacher (drawn by Thomas Williams)
- Dough Nut & Rusty (drawn by Trevor Metcalfe)
- Draculass (1975–1976; continued in Buster until 1977) (drawn by Terry Bave)
- Grizzly Bearhug
- The Invisible Monster
- Kid Kong (1975–1976; continued in Buster until 1982) (drawn by Robert Nixon)
- Major Jump Horror Hunter
- March of the Mighty Ones
- Martha's Monster Make-Up (1975-1977) (drawn by Ken Reid)
- Monster Hits Jokes
- Mummy's Boy (1975-1976; continued in Buster until 1988), (drawn by Norman Mansbridge)
- Tom Thumbscrew
- X-Ray Specs (1975-1976; continued in Buster until 2000) (drawn by Mike Lacey)

=== Later strips ===
- Gums (1976; continued in Buster until 1984) (by Roy Davies and Robert Nixon)
- Frankie's Diary
- Freaky Farm (drawn by Jim Watson)
- The Little Monsters
- S.O.S. Save Our Stan as well as many pull-out posters
- Teddy Scare (1976; continued in Buster until 1977) (by Barrie Appleby)
- Terror TV (1976; continued in Buster until 1978) (drawn by Ian Knox)

=== Revival strips ===
Note: Strips marked with a double dagger (‡) only appeared in the Halloween Spooktacular 2022, or in a single issue of the revival run.

This list does not include stand-alone, single issue, stories.

==== Revived strips ====
- ‡Birdman, Chicken & Sparrow (originally in Krazy Comic and later reprinted in Buster) - Sparrow is a new character to the strip
- Crabbe's Crusaders (originally in Buster)
- ‡Creature Teacher (from the original Monster Fun run)
- Draculass (from the original Monster Fun run)
- ‡Evil Eye (originally in Whoopee!)
- Frankie Stein (originally in Wham!, Shiver and Shake, Whoopee! and the original Monster Fun run)
- ‡Grimly Feendish (originally in Wham!)
- Gums (from the original Monster Fun run and later Buster)
- Hire a Horror (originally in Cor!!)

- A spin-off The Fright-Shift was introduced from issue 20

- Kid Kong (from the original Monster Fun run)
- The Leopard from Lime Street (originally in Buster)
- Martha's Monster Make-Up (from the original Monster Fun run and later Buster)
- Steel Commando (originally in Thunder)
- ‡Sweeny Toddler (has only appeared in the Halloween Spooktacular 2022, a story was also available in the web-store exclusive edition of issue 1) (originally in Shiver and Shake, Whoopee!, Whizzer and Chips and Buster)
- ‡Teddy Scare! (from the original Monster Fun run and later Buster)

==== New strips ====
- Captain Zom
- Forest of Fear
- Frankencritter
- ‡Gah! The Gobblin' Goblin
- Global Ghoulies (single-page cartoon in the style of Ken Reid's Creepy Creations and World Wide Weirdies)
- ‡Harry & Gary
- Hell's Angel
- ‡Jump Junior, Monster Helper
- ‡Molly's Mummy
- Peaches' Creatures
- Pop Grrrl
- Rex Power
- Sally Astro
- ‡Scare Salon
- Sir Render
- Space Invaded!
- Witch Vs Warlock
- ‡Wiz War
