= Sports school (disambiguation) =

Sports School may refer to:

- Sports school
- Singapore Sports School, a specialized independent school in Singapore
- National Sport School (Canada), a public high school in Calgary, Alberta
- Sports School (comic strip), a strip in the British comic Shiver and Shake
