= Saluting trap =

Military practical joke

A saluting trap was a form of officer harassment practised by conscripts in the British Army during and after World War II.

Given their general lack of control over their lives in the Army, and the long periods of boredom inherent in Army life, the men would grasp at any form of control they had. Conscripts were required to salute any officer they met, and the officer was required to return the salute.

To harass the officer, the conscripts would gather in a group, the larger the better, and wait out of sight for an officer. When a British officer appeared some distance away, the conscripts would set out, one by one after the British officer's direction. The object was to force the officer to salute as many soldiers as possible in as short a time as possible, hopefully making the officer's arm sore in the process.

== See also ==
- List of practical joke topics
