= Capping stunt =

New Zealand student prank tradition

A capping stunt or capping is a New Zealand university tradition of student pranks wherein students perpetrate hoaxes or practical jokes upon an unsuspecting population. They traditionally take place in May during graduation.

Capping stunts have a long tradition in New Zealand, and are a prominent event at and around campuses throughout the country, with many notable instances reaching national or local headlines.

The stunts commonly play on the accepted civil rules of the host city, with the local city councils or media as the target. The capping stunts that generate the most media exposure generally involve passive techniques such as letter writing; however, material pranks such as the suspension of inflatable genitals from university property are common.

== Examples ==
A frequently referenced stunt is the Victoria University stunt where local workmen were told that students dressed as police were planning a fake arrest, while local police were told that students dressed as workmen were planning to dig up the road. This stunt encompasses all key elements.

In 1952, University of Otago students, tired of being misrepresented by the Otago Daily Times, perpetrated a nationwide UFO hoax in order to display the shortcomings of the local paper.

In May 1985, a capping stunt involving students from the University of Auckland captured attention when they rolled drums labelled "cyanide" off the back of a truck at the intersection of Queen Street and Victoria Street in central Auckland. As a precaution, the area was cordoned off and evacuated. Upon investigation, the drums were found to contain harmless dry ice and a red jelly-like substance.

Occasionally, capping stunts will prey on other students, particularly those in their first year of study. In May 2004, a Massey University stunt involved staging auditions for extras in Peter Jackson's King Kong. After advertising the auditions in the student newspaper, over 200 students auditioned for a part. Each signed a disclaimer which included "I also understand that TheatreRecruitment does not guarantee part in any movie, but will endeavor to act in the best interests of entertainment".

The most notable recent suspected capping stunt was the Waiheke Island foot and mouth disease threat of May 2005, which was suspected to be a stunt by Massey University in Palmerston North. A letter was sent to Prime Minister Helen Clark stating that the disease had been released onto the island. Police said that the letter came from the Manawatu Region, and coincided with graduation week.

== See also ==
- List of practical joke topics
