= Kazuo Uzuki =

Fictional baseball player

- Pitcher
- Born: 14 April 1991; Sarufutsu, Japan
- Bats: Right Throws: Right

Kazuo Uzuki is a fictional baseball player, the subject of a baseball card issued by Topps as an April Fools' Day hoax. The card was released on February 6, 2008, of a supposed high school superstar named Kazuo "The Uzi" Uzuki. In Japanese, Kazuo Uzuki means "the first son of April." The person actually depicted on the card was a New York University law student named Sensen Lin.

He is listed as 5'11" and 165 lbs and could supposedly throw a 104 mph pitch. According to the card, Uzuki would be the first Japanese player to go straight from high school in Japan into professional baseball in the United States.

The Uzuki rookie card was found in one out of every 72 packs of cards. When the card was released, people did not know that it was a joke and the card was trading for around $10–$15 on eBay.

Already being called "The Uzi" by some for his 104 MPH fastball, Kaz will be the first Japan-based high-schooler to jump straight to professional baseball in America when he graduates in 2009. "He is, hands down, the best pitching prospect I've seen in 30 years," said one MLB scout. And one unnamed American League GM said, "The contract this kid is going to get will be astronomical." At age fourteen, he was the youngest player invited to the WBC squad trials and - though he was cut on the last day - he made a lasting impression with his 17 Ks in 7 innings of work during intrasquad matches.

— Text on the back side of the card

== See also ==
- Sidd Finch
