= Plate lifter =

Novelty item

A plate lifter or plate wobbler is a novelty item consisting of a tube with a small flat bladder on one end and a bulb on the other. The bladder is to be placed under a plate; inflating it will make the plate wobble. This fake demonstration of psychokinesis is intended to provoke surprise and merriment.

A free plate wobbler was included with the first issue of the British comic magazine Monster Fun and promoted as a "monster mirth maker".

== In industry ==
"Plate lifter" is the name of various devices used in industry for handling heavy metal plates.
