= Golden rivet =

Concept in naval folklore

A golden rivet refers to the claim in naval folklore that the final rivet hammered into a ship is a commemorative made of gold. The idea seemingly derived from the commemorative golden spike that was temporarily driven at the completion of the U.S. transcontinental railroad in 1869.

== Description ==
The rivet's location is allegedly different for each ship and undisclosed, known only to the crew. No such rivet can exist, as gold is too malleable a material. If a golden rivet was made, it would be impossible to hammer it in without destroying it in the process.

== Use as a prank ==
Most often the myth is used as a practical joke or fool's errand played on junior sailors, exploiting their naivete and natural curiosity about their new surroundings.

The prank consists of informing a new sailor of the existence of the "golden rivet" and encouraging him to look for it. After scouring the entire ship without success, it eventually dawns on the junior that he has been the butt of a joke.

Like many other hazing rituals, the "golden rivet" myth is perpetuated for the amusement of senior crewmembers at the expense of their naive and gullible junior crewmates.

== See also ==
- U.S. Navy slang
