= Shaft passer =

Hypothetical device

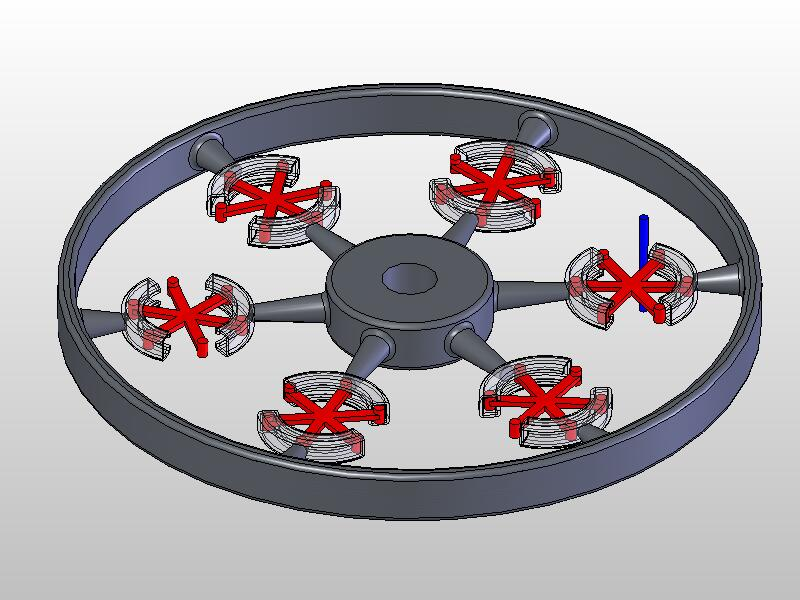
Wheel with shaft passers

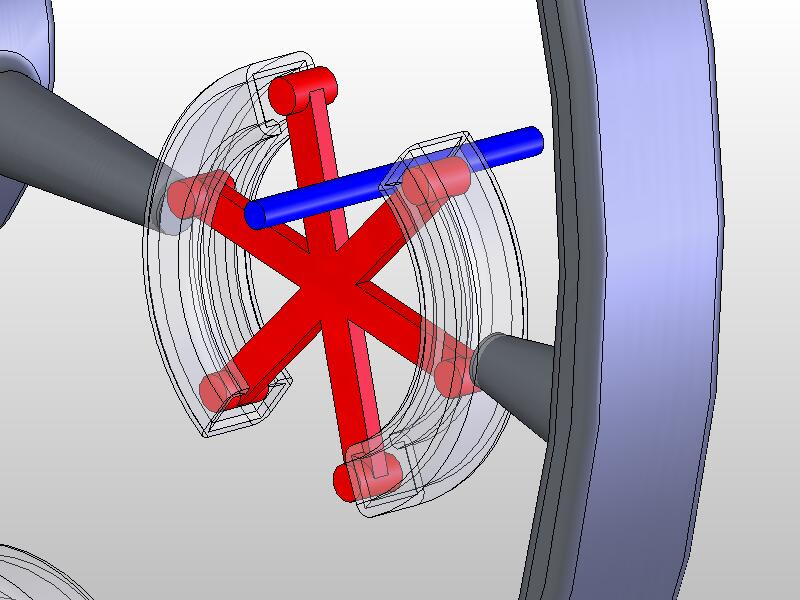
Detail of a shaft passer

A shaft passer is a device that allows a spoked wheel to rotate despite having a shaft (such as the axle of another wheel) passing between its spokes. The device is usually mentioned as a joke between nerds, in the manner of a fool's errand, however, examples do exist. In ~100 C.E. Heron describes a horse statue with the neck connected to its body with a shaft passer. A sword (acting as the "shaft") could slice through the neck but the head would not detach. In 2023 Blonder created a two and three dimensional shaft passer that allows a wire mesh cube to penetrate a mesh screen under its own weight.

One of the earliest modern references to these devices was made by Richard Feynman, who was told by a colleague at Frankford Arsenal in Philadelphia that the cable-passing version of the device had been used during both world wars on German naval mine mooring cables, to prevent the mines from being caught by British cables swept along the sea bottom.

The device was supposed to work using a spoked, rimless wheel that allows cables to pass through as it rotates. The ends of the spokes are widened, and the cable is held together by a short curved sleeve through which these spoke ends slide.
