= X-Ray Specs (comic strip) =

X-Ray Specs was a British comic strip illustrated by Mike Lacey that appeared in the first issue of the British comic Monster Fun on 14 June 1975. It features a young boy who acquired a set of X-Ray spectacles with which he could see through everything.

== Premise ==
X-Ray Specs followed the adventures of a boy called Ray and his square-shaped spectacles, which were lent to him by I.Squint, the optician. These spectacles gave Ray x-ray vision with which he could see through everything. Ray could adjust the power of this vision at will; it could range from a view under people's clothes (such as for spotting stolen goods from under a man's jacket), to skeletons and walls. Ray later discovered that if he turned the spectacles around and looked through the front of the lenses, he could see a living person from his skeleton — a kind of reverse x-ray with the added dimension of time. In issues 15 (20 September 1975) and 20 (25 October 1975), Ray was the cover star of the comic, and the strip was retained in Buster's first issue on 6 November 1976.

== History ==
Becoming the cover star for a short period in 1988, X-Ray Specs continued inside Buster until the comic itself finished, despite becoming a reprint in the 1990s with all other Buster strips. Ray's last appearance was on the last page of the final issue at the beginning of 2000 as part of "How It All Ends" (drawn by Jack Edward Oliver), a page showing what eventually happened to most of Buster's characters. In this, I.Squint was seen outside his optician shop snatching the spectacles back from Ray, saying that he only lent Ray the spectacles in 1975, and that he didn't say he could keep them. This is at odds, however, with a strip in a Monster Fun annual, in which Ray breaks his specs on Christmas Eve while looking for his present, and finds out the next day that his present is a new pair of specs from I.Squint.

== See also ==
- X-Ray Specs (novelty)
