= Practical joke =

Mischievous trick played on someone

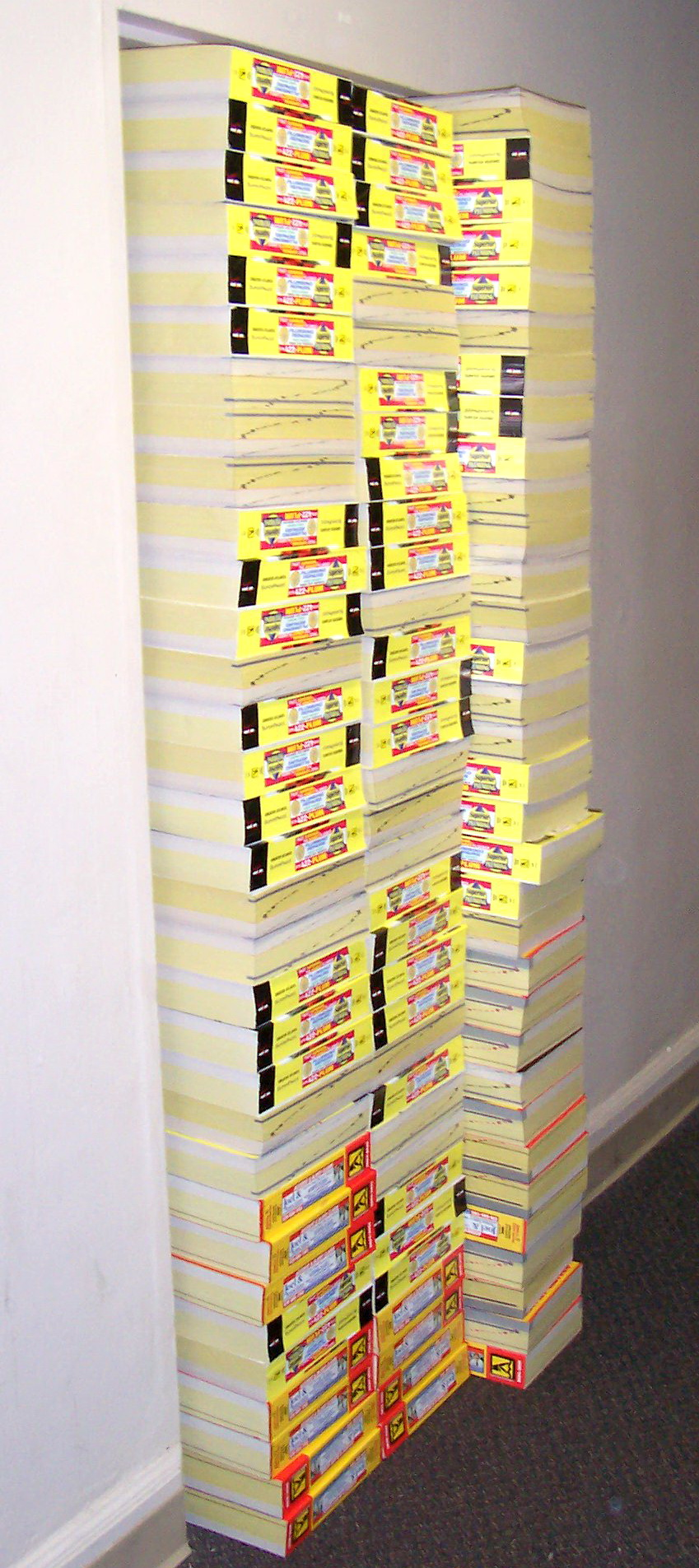
Practical joke involving completely blocking someone's doorway with phone books

A practical joke, also known as a prank or trolling, is a trick played on people, generally causing the victim to experience embarrassment, perplexity, confusion, discomfort, or irritation. The perpetrator of a practical joke is called a "practical joker", "prankster" or "troll". Other terms for practical jokes include gag, jape and shenanigan. Some countries in western nations make it tradition to carry out pranks on April Fools' Day and Mischief Night.

== Purpose ==
Practical jokes differ from confidence tricks or hoaxes in that the victim finds out, or is let in on the joke, rather than being talked into handing over money or other valuables. Practical jokes are generally lighthearted and without lasting effect; they aim to make the victim feel humbled or foolish, but not victimized or humiliated. Thus most practical jokes are affectionate gestures of humour and designed to encourage laughter. However, practical jokes performed with cruelty can constitute bullying, whose intent is to harass or exclude rather than reinforce social bonds through ritual humbling.

== Description ==
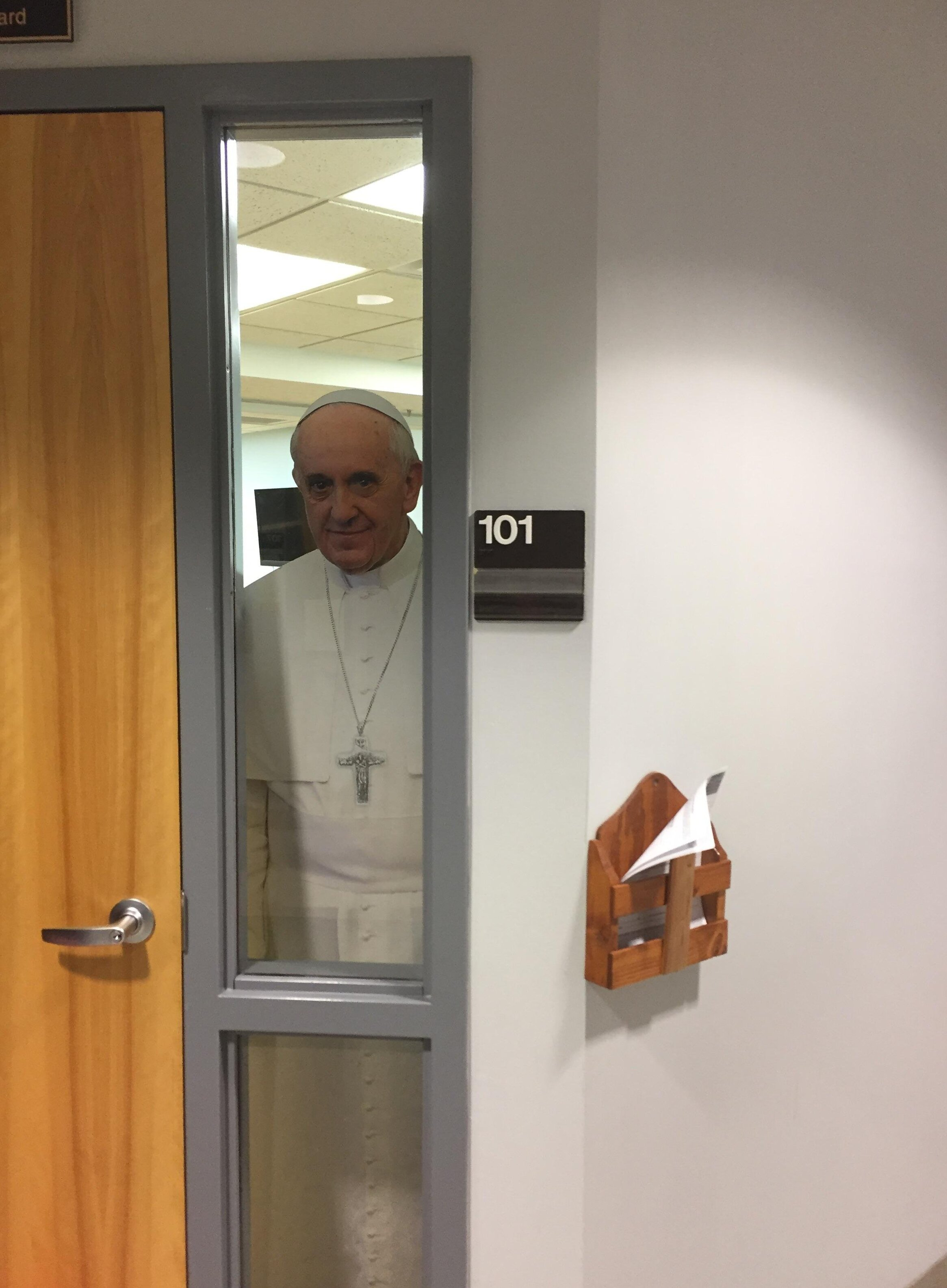
A life-sized cardboard cutout of Pope Francis peeks through an office window, giving off the illusion that the former supreme pontiff is inside staring back at the viewer

A practical joke is "practical" because it consists of someone doing something that is physical, in contrast to a verbal or written joke. For example, the joker who is setting up and conducting the practical joke might hang a bucket of water above a doorway and rig the bucket using pulleys so when the door opens the bucket dumps the water. The joker would then wait for the victim to walk through the doorway and be drenched by the bucket of water. Objects can feature in practical jokes, like fake vomit, chewing-gum bugs, exploding cigars, stink bombs, costumes, whoopee cushions, clear tape, and Chinese finger traps. A practical joke can be as long as a person desires; it does not have to be short-lived.

Practical jokes often occur in offices, usually to surprise co-workers. Examples include covering computer accessories with Jell-O, wrapping a desk with Christmas paper or aluminium foil or filling it with balloons. Practical jokes also commonly occur during sleepovers, when children and teenagers play pranks on their friends as they come into the home, enter a room or even as they sleep.

American humorist H. Allen Smith wrote a 320-page book in 1953 called The Compleat Practical Joker that contains numerous examples of practical jokes. The book became a best seller – not only in the United States but also in Japan. Moira Marsh has written an entire volume about practical jokes. She found that in the US males perpetrate such gags more often than females.

== Student prank ==
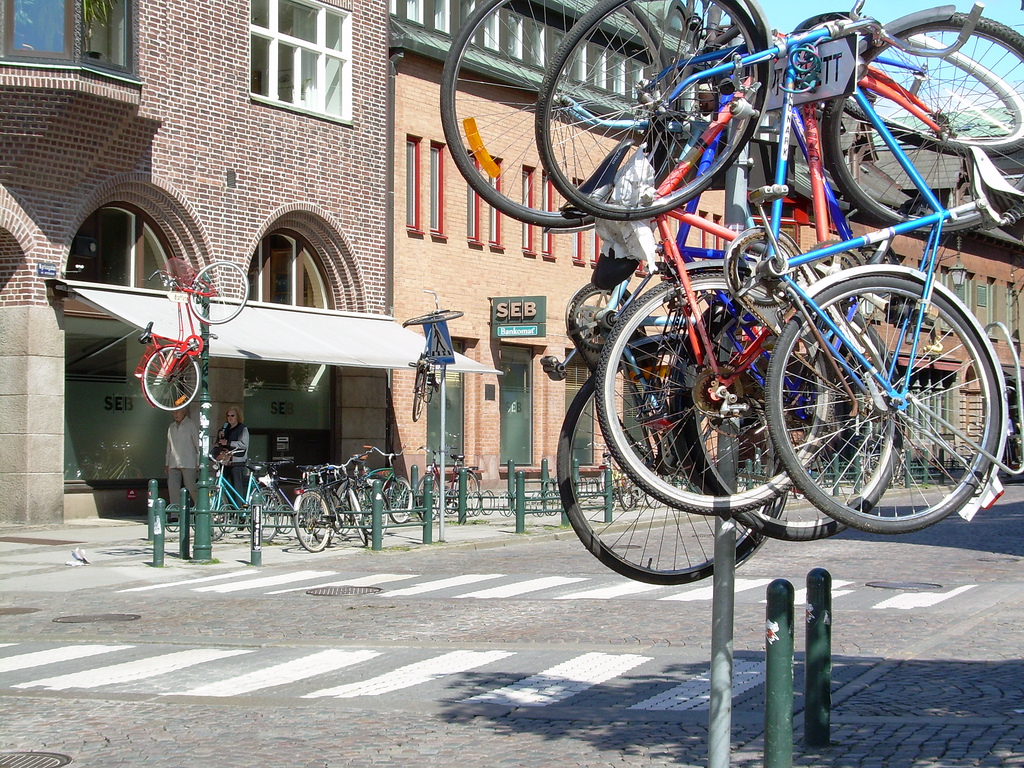
Bicycles hanging high as the result of a student prank in Lund, Sweden

University students have a long association with pranks and japes. These can often involve petty crime, such as the theft of traffic cones and other public property, or hoaxes.

=== Finland ===
A long running student tradition in Finland, is to practice a yearly student prank, called a jäynä. This is a harmless, often clever or technological practical joke, prank, or stunt, which is rooted in Finnish engineering student culture (also known as Teekkari culture). Its purpose is to amuse the perpetrators, the target, and the public, rather than to cause harm or damage. Famous examples include elaborate, humorous hoaxes, like a 2016 report to the media, that the long-awaited western expansion of the Helsinki metro was cancelled due to flying squirrels.

=== Theft ===
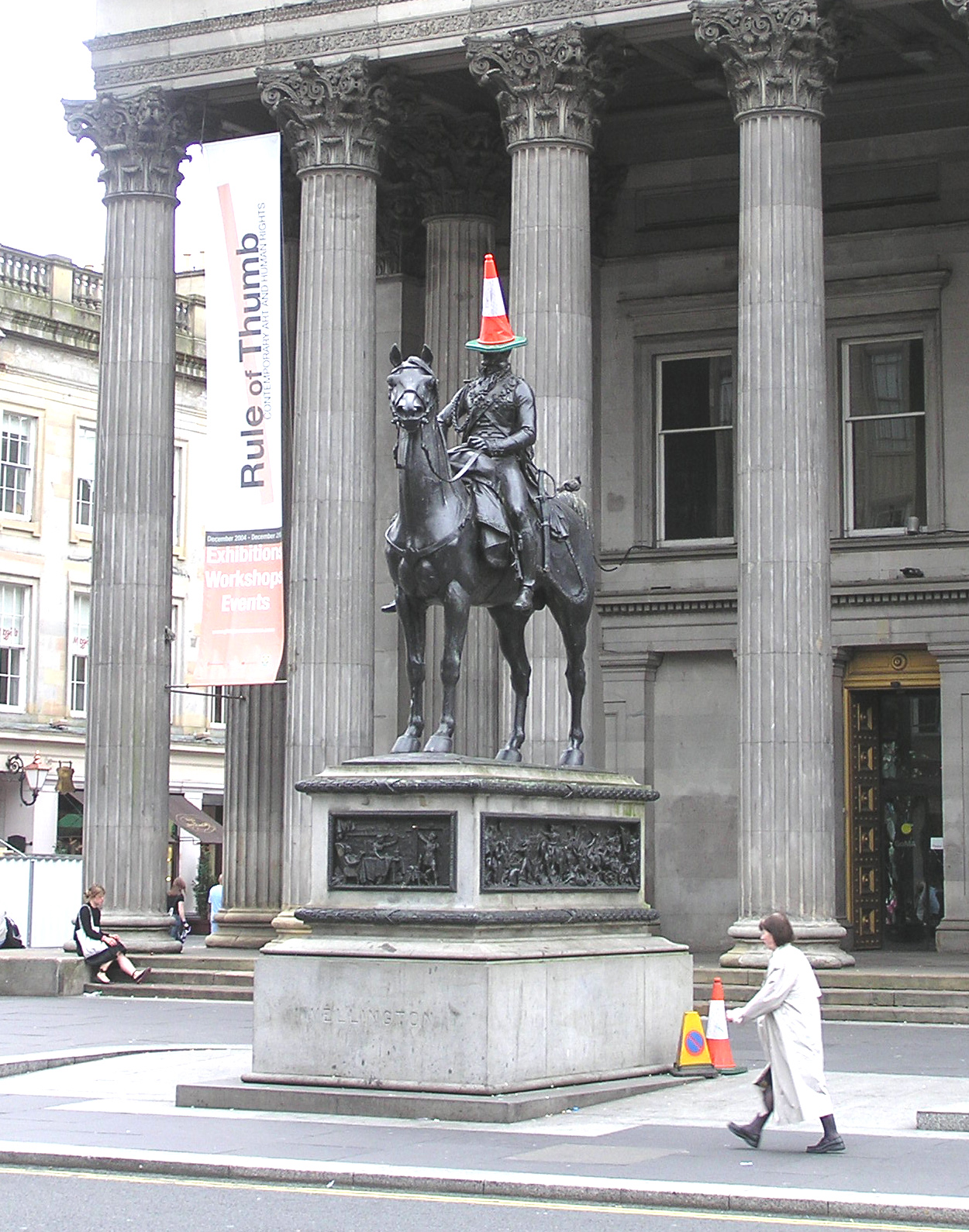
A statue of the Duke of Wellington in front of the Gallery of Modern Art, Glasgow, which is famous for having had a traffic cone repeatedly placed on its head since the 1980s.

One classic target of student theft is traffic cones. The issue of the theft and misuse of traffic cones by students has gained enough prominence that a spokesperson from the UK National Union of Students stated that "stereotypes of students stealing traffic cones" are "outdated".

Some universities have gone as far as to devote entire pages of legislation and advice for students with regard to the consequences and laws involving the theft of traffic cones. Misuse of traffic cones in Scotland has even resulted in serious physical injury.

The traffic cone theft issue came to such a head in the United Kingdom in the 1990s that it was brought up in parliament.

In 2002, Fife Constabulary declared a "traffic cone amnesty" allowing University of St Andrews students to return stolen traffic cones without fear of prosecution. A police spokesman had said that the theft of traffic cones had become "an almost weekly occurrence".

Other forms of theft that can cause safety issues include the theft of stop signs.

== Famous examples ==
One practical joke, recalled as his favorite by the playwright Charles MacArthur, involved American painter and bohemian character Waldo Peirce. While living in Paris in the 1920s, Peirce "made a gift of a large turtle to the woman who was the concierge of his building". The woman doted on the turtle and lavished care on it. A few days later Peirce substituted a larger turtle for the original one. This continued for some time, with the surreptitious substitution of bigger turtles into the woman's apartment. The concierge, beside herself with happiness, displayed her miraculous turtle to the entire neighborhood. Peirce then replaced the turtle with smaller and smaller ones, to her bewildered distress. This became the storyline of the 1990 Roald Dahl children's book Esio Trot.

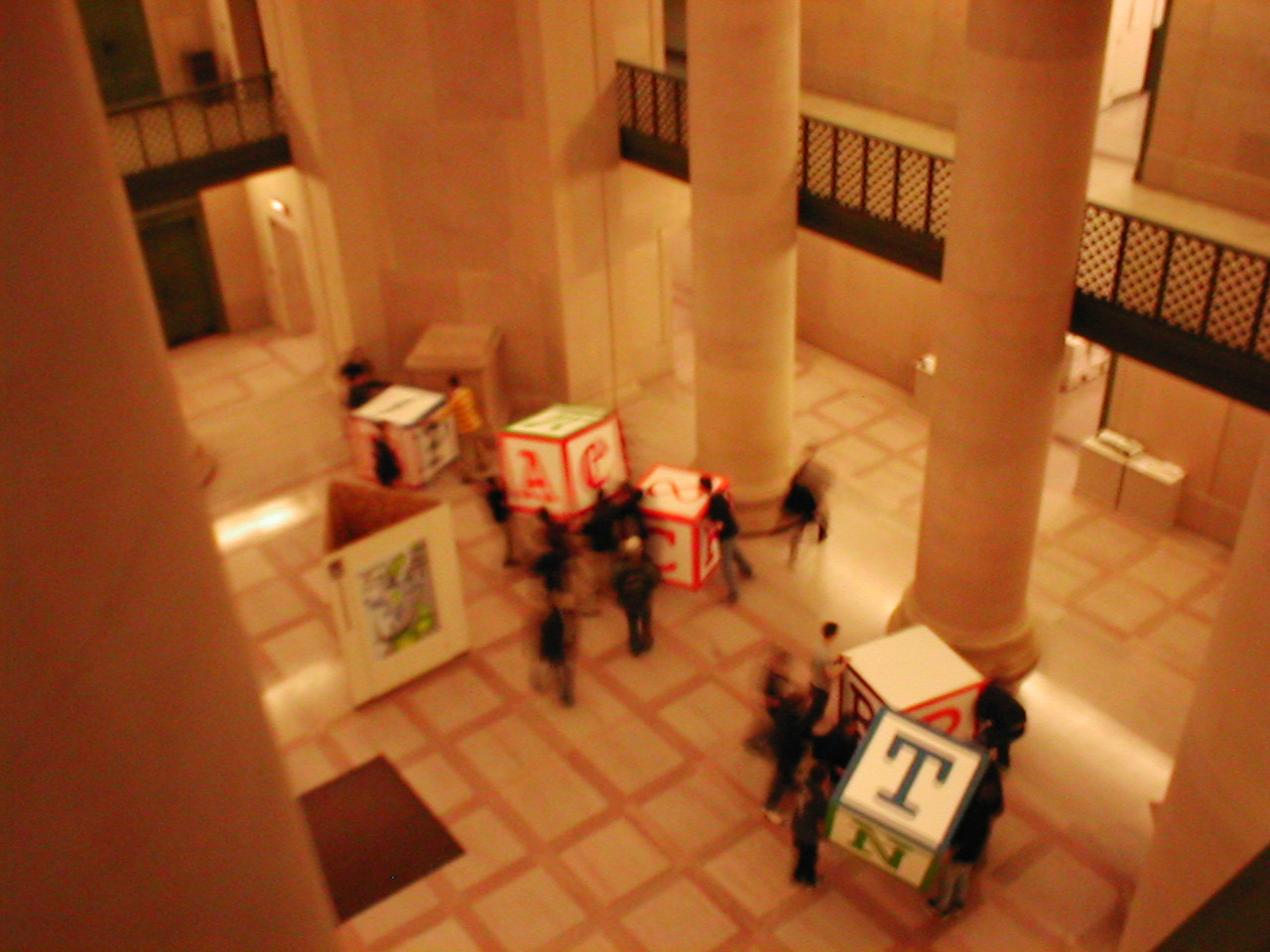
A hack in progress in Lobby 7 at MIT

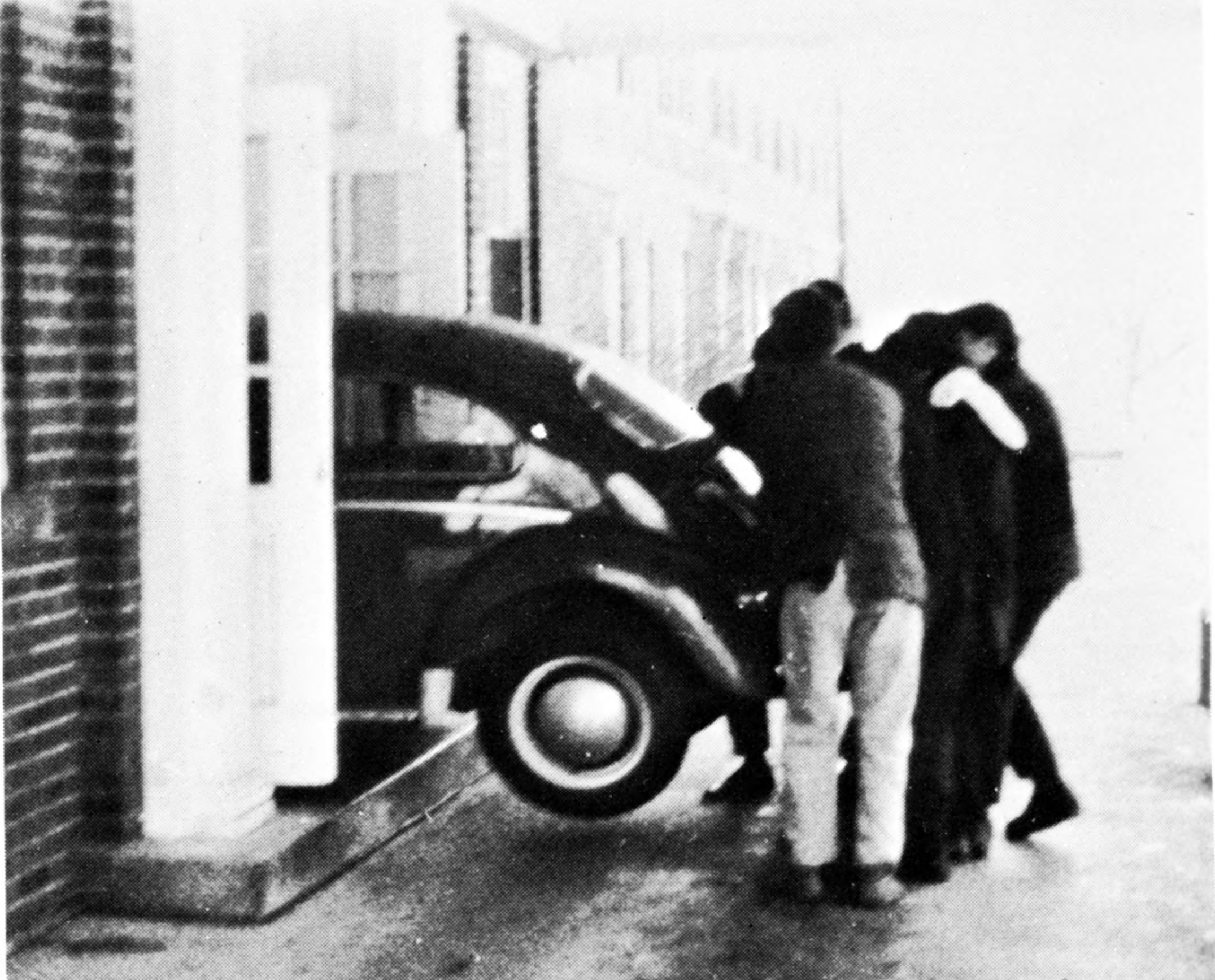
Shimer College students pushing a VW Beetle into a campus building

Successful modern pranks often take advantage of the modernization of tools and techniques. In Canada, engineering students have a reputation for annual pranks; at the University of British Columbia these usually involve leaving a Volkswagen Beetle in an unexpected location (such as suspended from the Golden Gate Bridge or from the Lions Gate Bridge). In response, other students at that university often vandalize the engineering students' white and red concrete cairn. Engineering students at Cambridge University in England undertook a similar prank, placing an Austin 7 car on top of the University's Senate House building. Pranks can also adapt to the political context of their era. Students at the Massachusetts Institute of Technology (MIT) have a particular reputation for their "hacks".

Not unlike the stone louse of Germany, the jackalope in the American West has become an institutionalized practical joke perennially perpetrated by ruralites (as a class) on tourists, most of whom have never heard of the decades-old myth.

In the 1993 film Grumpy Old Men, two neighbors and former friends, John and Max, play cruel practical jokes on each other. Their rivalry escalates when a beautiful new neighbor is involved as both set their sights on her. In that film's 1995 sequel, Grumpier Old Men, John and Max have cooled off their feud. They later play cruel practical jokes on a beautiful, determined Italian owner who's trying to turn a former bait shop into a romantic restaurant.

The 2003 TV movie Windy City Heat consists of an elaborate practical joke on the film's star, Perry Caravallo, who is led to believe that he is starring in a faux action film, Windy City Heat, where the filming (which is ostensibly for the film's DVD extras) actually documents a long chain of pranks and jokes performed at Caravallo's expense.

In the UK, a group that calls itself Trollstation plays pranks on people, including police officers and government employees. They record their escapades and upload them to YouTube. In one such video, one of the groups actors poses as a palace guard. Some of the actors have been fined or charged.

== See also ==
- California Institute of Technology pranks
- Capping stunt
- Dreadnought hoax
- Gag name
- George Hayduke
- Hacks at the Massachusetts Institute of Technology
- List of practical joke topics
- Pieing
- Practical joke device
- Prank call
- Pranknet
- Senior prank
- Snipe hunt
- Spaghetti-tree hoax
- The Game (mind game)
- Merry Pranksters
