= My Bare Lady =

My Bare Lady may refer to:

- My Bare Lady (TV series), a 2006 United Kingdom-based reality TV show
- My Bare Lady (film), a 1963 British exploitation film
