= Michael Klinger (producer) =

British film producer and distributor (1920–1989)

- Born: 1 November 1920; London, England
- Died: 15 September 1989 (aged 68); Watford, Hertfordshire, England
- Occupations: Film producer, film distributor

Michael Klinger (1 November 1920 – 15 September 1989) was an English film producer and distributor. He co-founded the Compton cinema chain and distribution company with Tony Tenser, and financed Repulsion (1965) and Cul-de-sac (1966), both directed by Roman Polanski. After their association ended, Klinger produced Get Carter (1971), starring Michael Caine, and Gold (1974), with Roger Moore in the lead, and was the executive producer of the 'Confessions' series of sex comedies with Robin Askwith.

== Early life ==
Klinger was born in London to Polish Jewish parents. His father was a tailor by trade. During the Second World War, Michael worked for the War Office as an inventor. He devised a machine to test bombs without the need to detonate them; however, because he was a government employee, he earned no money for the invention except for a six shilling pay increase.

After the War, Klinger worked on the market in the East End of London, before being offered the opportunity to invest in a Soho cinema.

== Partnership with Tony Tenser ==
Klinger was initially the owner of a strip club, but began a business association with Tony Tenser in 1960 after they had met following a publicity stunt organised by Tenser at a cinema Klinger managed.

The two men opened a private members cinema, the Compton Club that year, apparently with John Trevelyan, then head of the British Board of Film Censors, as a founder member. A distribution firm Compton Cameo Films was established. Both enterprises were originally dedicated to imported exploitation films, but undertook its own films in the 'nudie' genre, though their first, Naked as Nature Intended (1961), directed by Harrison Marks and starring Pamela Green, was marketed as a documentary. For about eighteen months, Klinger and Tenser's company owned the Windmill Theatre, after its nude reviews had ended, and reverting the auditorium into its earlier use as a cinema, and using it as a setting for Secrets of a Windmill Girl (1966).

It was Klinger though who persuaded Tenser to back the first English language feature films of Polish director Roman Polanski. Despite the success of Repulsion (1965) and Cul-de-Sac (1966), Klinger and Tenser ended their business connection in 1967.

== Klinger's solo career ==
Klinger sent the Ted Lewis novel Jack's Return Home to director Mike Hodges, asking whether he would be interested in adapting and directing a film version. Hodges agreed. The result, starring Michael Caine, Get Carter, was released early in 1971. Klinger, Hodges and Caine formed a production company to make Pulp which followed in 1972.

Klinger was the executive producer of the Confessions series of sex comedies (Window Cleaner/Pop Performer/Driving Instructor/Holiday Camp) during the period 1974-78. He continued with big budget action films, such as Gold (1974) and Shout at the Devil (1976), both starring Roger Moore and with Lee Marvin in the later. The two films were based on novels by Wilbur Smith, and aimed an international market.

He died in Watford. His son,

== Personal life ==
Klinger's son, Tony (b. 1950), has had a career in the film and television industry.

=== Death ===
Klinger died in Watford on 15 September 1989, at the age of 68.

== Filmography ==
Produced by Michael Klinger and Tony Tenser

- Naked as Nature Intended (documentary, uncredited executive producer, 1961)
- That Kind of Girl (executive producer, 1963)
- The Yellow Teddy Bears (US: Gutter Girls, 1963)
- London in the Raw (documentary, 1964)
- The Black Torment (1964)
- Saturday Night Out (1964)
- Primitive London (documentary, 1965)
- A Study in Terror (executive producer, 1965)
- Repulsion (executive producer, 1965)
- The Projected Man (executive producer, 1966)
- Cul-de-sac (1966)
- Secrets of a Windmill Girl (executive producer, 1966)

Produced by Michael Klinger

- The Pleasure Girls (1965)
- Muhair (1967)
- The Penthouse (executive producer, 1967)
- Baby Love (executive producer, 1968)
- The London That Nobody Knows (1969)
- Get Carter (1971)
- Something to Hide (US: Shattered, 1972)
- Pulp (1972)
- Barcelona Kill (executive producer, 1973)
- Confessions of a Window Cleaner (executive producer, 1974)
- Gold (1974)
- Rachel's Man (1975)
- Confessions of a Pop Performer (executive producer, 1975)
- Shout at the Devil (1976)
- Confessions of a Driving Instructor (executive producer, 1976)
- Confessions of a Summer Camp Councillor (executive producer, 1977)
- Blood Relatives (executive producer, 1978)
- Tomorrow Never Comes (1978)
- Riding High (1981)
- The Assassinator (executive producer, 1988)
