= Janie Jones =

British singer

- Born: Marion Mitchell; 1941 (age 84–85); Seaham, County Durham, England
- Occupation: Singer
- Instrument: Vocals
- Labels: His Master's Voice; Columbia; Pye; Major Minor; President; Big Beat

Marion Mitchell (born 1941), better known by her stage name Janie Jones, is an English former singer. She achieved notoriety in August 1964, when she attended the film premiere of London in the Raw wearing a topless dress. She became renowned for holding sex parties at her home during the 1970s, and was jailed for her involvement in "controlling prostitutes".

== Early career ==
Marion Mitchell was born in 1941 in Seaham, County Durham. Jones began her show-business career as a cabaret artist in late 1950s London. She performed first at the Windmill Theatre, and later in clubs in Mayfair and elsewhere in London. Her sister Valerie Mitchell later released a single called The Windmill Girls, the theme tune of the 1966 film Secrets of a Windmill Girl.

She began recording songs and embarked on another career as a pop singer in the 1960s, her greatest success coming in 1966 with the novelty song "Witches Brew", which was her first single reached number 46 in the UK singles chart. Subsequent releases failed to have any impact in the UK chart, but were all collected and released on the compilation album, We're in Love with the World of Janie Jones, in 1997. At the height of her fame as a singer, Jones appeared on various television programmes, including Thank Your Lucky Stars and Mike and Bernie's Show.

== Imprisonment ==
In 1974, Jones was sentenced to seven years imprisonment (serving three years) for her involvement in "controlling prostitutes". Whilst in jail, she befriended the serial killer Myra Hindley, and made numerous television appearances insisting that Hindley was a reformed woman and should be considered for release. However, Jones developed a deep hatred for Hindley in 1986, when Hindley finally confessed to her other crimes. In 1993 she wrote a biography titled The Devil and Miss Jones: The Twisted Mind of Myra Hindley.

After being released from prison, she made occasional appearances on shows including The Russell Harty Show, where she sang two songs in 1977, the BBC's The Time of Your Life in 1984, where she appeared in a reconstruction of the summer of 1964, and The James Whale Radio Show, in an episode focusing on the theme of Scandal in 1990.

== The Clash ==
Jones is the subject of a song by the Clash called "Janie Jones", which was released in 1977 as the opening track on the band's eponymous debut album. In 2006, the song was covered by Babyshambles. Jones appeared in the music video for the Babyshambles version, being chauffeured around London together with Mick Jones.

In 1983, Jones, backed by members of the Clash and the Blockheads and credited as Janie Jones & the Lash, recorded a single, "House of the Ju-Ju Queen" b/w "Sex Machine", which was produced by Joe Strummer and released the following year. In December 1983, the British music magazine NME reported that Jones was on the 'comeback trail'.

== Discography ==
- "Witches Brew" / "Take-A My Tip" (11/65) HMV POP1495 – UK: No. 46
- "Gunning for You" / "Go Go Away from Me" (3/66) HMV POP1514
- "Tickle Me Tootsie Wootsies" / "High and Dry" (4/67) Columbia DB8173
- "Charlie Smith" / "Nobody's Perfect" (5/68) Pye 7N17550
- "Girl's Song" / "I've Never Met a Boy Like You" (9/68) Major Minor MM577
- "Back on My Feet Again" / "Psycho" (1970) President PT309
- "House of the Ju-Ju Queen" / "Sex Machine" (as Janie Jones & the Lash, 1983) Big Beat NS91 Janie Jones RPM177
