= Miracle Man (superhero) =

- Miracle Man (r.) and Supercoat (l.) on the cover of Miracle Man #11.

Publication information
- Publisher: Editorial Ferma; Thorpe & Porter
- First appearance: Superhombre #1 (1958) (as Superhombre); Miracle Man #1 (1965)(as Miracle Man)
- Created by: Mick Anglo

In-story information
- Alter ego: John "Johnny" Chapman
- Species: Human
- Partnerships: Inspector Stewart; Miracle Boy/Supercoat
- Notable aliases: Superhombre
- Abilities: Flight; Super-strength; Super-intelligence; Invulnerability; Enhanced senses

Miracle Man is a fictional British Silver Age comic book superhero. The character was originally created by Mick Anglo for Barcelona-based Spanish publisher Editorial Ferma in 1958 as Superhombre, running for 68 issues. In 1965 Anglo repurposed the character as Miracle Man for Thorpe & Porter, who released the monthly Miracle Man via their Top Sellers imprint between 1965 and 1966, running for 13 issues. While Miracle Man has a wide number of similarities with Anglo's earlier creation Marvelman (himself inspired by Fawcett's Captain Marvel), the strips were not redrawn versions of that character's adventures, although many covered similar themes.

A variation of the character's name - Miracleman - was used when legal issues saw Alan Moore's 1980s revival of Marvelman renamed, and had already been used by writer as the name for an analogue of Marvelman in his Captain Britain stories.

== Publication history ==
During his employment with L. Miller & Son, Ltd., Mick Anglo was engaged by Spanish publisher Editorial Ferma to create a superhero and devised Superhombre, heavily based on the Captain Marvel template. While Anglo created the character, the work on the strips themselves was largely by writer Juan Llarch and artist Emilio Giralt Ferrando. Like Marvelman only the covers were in colour, with the interiors being in black and white. Following the end of the Marvelman titles and an unsuccessful attempt to set up his own Anglo Comics label, Anglo subsequently adapted the Superhombre material into English and sold it to Thorpe & Porter as Miracle Man. The name had previously been considered for Marvelman during that character's creation in 1954. Sold under the publisher's Top Sellers imprint it ran for 13 issues from 1965 to 1966 before being cancelled. The monthly title costing a Shilling for a 68-page comic initially consisted entirely of multiple Miracle Man adventures (aside from a small number of adverts) due to the large inventory of Superhombre strips. Later this was supplemented by reprints of Blackhawk licensed from DC.

The strip was also exported to Germany by Bildschriftenverlag (a sister company of Williams Publishing) as Miracle Man - Der Wundermann, lasting for 25 issues from 1966 to 1969; to the Netherlands as Mirakel Man by Classics Nederland, lasting 20 issues; and to Denmark as Mirakelmanden by I.K., lasting only a single issue.

In 1989 the character made a guest appearance in Grant Morrison's 2000AD strip Zenith as one of a large number of multiversal superheroes battling the Lloigor. Due to the character's uncertain legal status he was unnamed but the character's distinctive costume was retained by artist Steve Yeowell. Miracle Man expresses discomfort with Lux's execution of the possessed Miss Wonderstarr and later battles the similarly converted Jack Flash. He survives the storyline and is returned to his own universe - though not before being shaken by a liaison with Meta Maid, who he had not realised was a pre-op transsexual.

=== Costume ===
For his appearances on the covers of Superhombre the character was consistently shown to wear a black helmet, a blue vest, a red cloak, black trunks and black boots, with the arms and legs bare. However, for the British printing the scheme was varied frequently, with the red and blue sometimes switched and the limbs coloured as extensions of the costume. Early appearances gave the character a set of goggles which were later dropped.

== Character Biography ==
Miracle Man is the alter ego of John or Johnny Chapman, a young boy in the employ of the initially New York-based sleuth Inspector Stewart, with later stories incorporating international travel. Clasping his magical sun disc talisman and calling "sun disc!" transforms him into the adult superhuman Miracle Man with a "BOOM!" onomatopoeia. A feature of the strip is the characters' dynamic; Stewart and the rest of the world are unaware of Chapman's dual identity meaning he has to slip away and change when danger appears. After the crisis and return to human form Chapman is typically chided for his absence by the ineffectual Stewart, who often emerges with a disproportionate amount of the credit.

Miracle Man battles a variety of threats, including an Abominable Snowman; alien invader Balak the Dominator and his giant octopus; bullying circus strongman Great Bill; nefarious circus owner Slippery Sam; scheming Arthurian knight Sir Roskol; Flang, King of Constellation Z; spies; a witch doctor of the African Masai tribe; gangs of diamond thieves; bank robber Barley and his Mechanical Men; Kansas train bandits; thief Garfield and his gang; an invasion fleet from planet Sherka; the John James gang; foreign agents; and Countess Rispini.

The strip "The Miracle Boy" in Miracle Man #3 saw a mysterious man named Mr. Silvernose gift a jacket bearing a sundisc motif to a homeless boy named Charlie Melbar, who was able to become Miracle Boy as a result. He appeared sporadically as an ally of Miracle Man in later issues, renamed Supercoat.

== Powers and abilities ==
Like forebears Marvelman, Captain Universe and Captain Miracle, Miracle Man's powers were broadly the same as those of the original Captain Marvel - flight, super-strength and invulnerability while in his superhero form. He also possess super-intelligence and an enhanced sense referred to as Miracle Sense that allows him to see and hear inside far-off buildings. Both he and Supercoat can travel back in time by breaking the light barrier.

Miracle Man's powers could be transferred to anyone who found the sun disc, including the unwitting navy sailor Joe, sick youth Simbo and villain Garfield.
