= Arnold Book Company =

British comic book publisher

- Status: Acquired by Thorpe & Porter (1958)
- Founded: 1948
- Founder: Arnold L. Miller
- Country of origin: United Kingdom
- Headquarters location: 2 Lower James Street; London W1
- Key people: Mick Anglo; Denis Gifford
- Publication types: Comics
- Fiction genres: Horror/suspense, crime, romance
- Imprints: Prize

Arnold Book Company (ABC) was a British publisher of comic books that operated in the late 1940s and 1950s, most actively from 1950 to 1954. ABC published original titles like the war comic Ace Malloy of the Special Squadron and the science fiction title Space Comics, and reprints of American horror and crime titles (many featuring the work of Joe Simon and Jack Kirby) like Adventures into the Unknown, Black Magic Comics, and Justice Traps the Guilty. British contributors to the company's titles include Mick Anglo and Denis Gifford. Arnold Book Company was closely connected to the fellow British comics publisher L. Miller & Son.

In the 1950s, Arnold Book Company suffered from backlash for some of its horror comic reprints, leading to the company's closure in 1958. ABC's founder, Arnold L. Miller, later became a filmmaker and film producer, primarily in the nudist and sexploitation genre.

== History ==
The company was founded in 1948 by Arnold Louis Miller, the "Son" in L. Miller & Son, Ltd. a British reprint publisher (founded in 1943) of many American comic books, primarily those of Fawcett Comics. (L. Miller & Son became known later on for the 1954 creation [by British writer/artist Mick Anglo] of Marvelman – a blatant imitation of Fawcett's Captain Marvel.)

Between 1950 and 1952, Mick Anglo produced a number of strips for Arnold Book Company, on stories such as "Captain Valiant" (in Space Comics) and Ace Malloy of the Special Squadron, while concurrently producing Space Commando Comics, featuring "Space Commander Kerry," for L. Miller & Son. In 1954, Anglo created two issues of Captain Universe for ABC, a near-identical character to Captain Marvel and Marvelman. (Note: Captain Universe uses a magic word, "Galap", to gain superhuman powers, just as Captain Marvel's "Shazam" and Marvelman's "Kimota.")

=== Relationship with Thorpe & Porter ===
In the period 1951 to 1953, the British distributor/publisher Thorpe & Porter (T & P) acquired a number of ABC's reprint titles, including Justice Traps the Guilty, Young Brides, Young Eagle, and Young Love. (When T & P acquired Justice Traps the Guilty, it continued the numbering of the ABC version; with the other titles, T & P restarted the numbering at #1.)

In 1953, Thorpe & Porter seems to have acquired the Arnold Book Company as a separate line; Arnold Book Company appears as an imprint on the T & P titles Justice Traps the Guilty, Kid Colt, Outlaw, Young Brides, and Young Romance from that point until 1958. (T & P later published a second volume of 13 issues of Justice Traps the Guilty.)

=== Horror comics controversy and closure ===
Starting around 1950, "lurid American 'crime' and 'horror comics' reached Britain." Titles such as EC Comics' The Haunt of Fear, Tales from the Crypt, and The Vault of Horror first arrived as ballast in ships from the United States, and at first were only available in the "environs of the great ports of Liverpool, Manchester, Belfast and London." EC's comics, which exhibited a gruesome joie de vivre, with grimly ironic fates meted out to many of the stories' protagonists, prompted what in retrospect has been characterised as a moral panic.

In 1952, Arnold Book Company cashed in on the popularity of horror comics with reprints of the (relatively gore-free) Prize Comics title Black Magic Comics, publishing that title into 1954. Around that same time, in 1952 and again in 1954, "using blocks made from imported American matrices," ABC printed British single-issue editions of EC's The Haunt of Fear, Tales from the Crypt, and The Vault of Horror, selling them in "small back-street newsagents." The ensuing outcry was heard in the British press; an article in The Times of April 22, 1955, accused horror comics of deranging young readers, pushing the most susceptible to desecrate local cemeteries. Shortly, at the urging of the Most Reverend Geoffrey Fisher, the Archbishop of Canterbury, Major Gwilym Lloyd George, the Home Secretary and Minister of Welsh Affairs, and the National Union of Teachers, Parliament passed the Children and Young Persons (Harmful Publications) Act 1955. The act targeted horror comics — especially ABC's EC reprint titles.

As a result of this backlash, Arnold Book Company had mostly shut down its comic book activities after 1954, and was closed down entirely in 1958.

== Titles published (selected) ==
=== Original titles ===
- Ace Malloy of the Special Squadron (17 issues, 1952–1954)
- Captain Universe (2 issues, 1954) — Mick Anglo's clone of Captain Marvel/Marvelman
- Space Comics (32 issues, 1953–1954) — contributions from Mick Anglo and Denis Gifford

=== Reprint titles ===
- Adventures into the Unknown (20 issues, 1950–c. 1951) — American Comics Group title of the same name
- Black Magic Comics (16 issues, 1952–1954) — Crestwood Publications' Prize Comics title of the same name; published by ABC under its Prize imprint
- The Haunt of Fear (3 issues, 1952–1954) — reprints from EC Comics's The Haunt of Fear and Shock SuspenStories
- Justice Traps the Guilty (28 issues, 1951–1953) — Crestwood Publications/Prize Comics title of the same name; acquired in 1957 by Thorpe & Porter and continued for another 15 issues under the Arnold Book Company imprint
- Tales from the Crypt (2 issues, 1952–1954) — reprints from the EC Comics' Tales from the Crypt, Shock SuspenStories, and Crime SuspenStories
- The Vault of Horror (1 issue, 1954) — EC Comics title of the same name
- Young Brides (10 issues, 1952) — Prize Comics title of the same name; acquired by Thorpe & Porter in 1953
- Young Eagle (8 issues, 1951) — Fawcett Publications title; acquired by Thorpe & Porter in 1951
- Young Love (12 issues, 1952) — Crestwood Publications title of the same name; acquired by Thorpe & Porter in 1953

== Arnold Miller's later career ==
After the closure of Arnold Book Company, Arnold Miller moved on to publishing the glamour magazine Photo Studio, and then transitioned to a career in filmmaking, particularly nudist and sexploitation movies. Arnold Miller's father Leonard was against his son's new career, and as a result of their dispute, he ejected Arnold from L. Miller & Son, which became simply L. Miller & Co.

Arnold Miller directed seven films in the period 1959 to 1970, produced several movies with Stanley Long, and worked with Tigon British Film Productions. Films directed by Miller include:

- Nudist Memories (1959)
- Nudes of the World (1961)
- West End Jungle (1961)
- Take Off Your Clothes and Live! (1963)
- London in the Raw (co-directed with Norman Cohen) (1964)
- Primitive London (1965)
- Secrets of a Windmill Girl (1966)
- A Touch of the Other (1970)
- Under the Table You Must Go (1970)
- Top of the Bill (1971)
- Growing Up: A New Approach to Sex Education, No. 1 (1971)
- Up and Away (1971)
- Top Gear (1972)
- Frustrated Wives (1974)
- Gateway to the Presidents (1975) — short film
- Yep and Nope (1975) — short
- Where the Fun Never Sets (1975) — short
- Two Man-Made Wonders (1975) — short
- Hollywood (1976) — short
- The Great Desert (1976) — short
- The Great Adventure (1977) — short
- Highway Five (1977) — short
- Sea World (1977) — short

Miller died on April 26, 2014, in Hertfordshire, England.
