= Debut =

Debut or début (the first public appearance of a person or thing) may refer to:

- Debut (society), the formal introduction of young upper-class women to society
- Debut novel, an author's first published novel
- Debut album, a recording artist's first album release

== Film and television ==
- The Debut (1977 film), or Het debuut by Nouchka van Brakel
- The Debut (2000 film), a Filipino–American drama film
- Debut (film), a 2017 Belarusian documentary film
- The Debut (2026 film), an American musical-comedy film
- "The Debut" (The O.C.), 2003
- Debut: A KPop Demon Hunters Story, an upcoming short film

== Music ==
- Debut Records, an American jazz record label
- Debut (Björk album), 1993
- Debut (Zoë album), 2015
- The Debut (album), a 2019 album by Jackie Evancho
- Debut Album (Sayuri Ishikawa album), 1973
- Debut, a 1987 album by The Real Group
- Debut, a 2004 album by Carol Kidd
- Debut, a 2007 album by Brandi Disterheft
- Debut, a 1991 album by Field Marshal Montgomery Pipe Band
- Debut, a 1992 album by Sarah Chang, 1992
- Debut: The Clef/Mercury Duo Recordings 1949-1951, a 2009 re-release of a 1956 Oscar Peterson album
- Debut, a 1955 album by Malcolm Mitchell
- "Debut" (song), by Katseye, 2024

== See also ==
- List of directorial debuts, a list of director's first commercial cinematic releases
- New product development
- First appearance of a character in comic books
