= Tony Tenser =

English film producer (1920–2007)

- Born: Samuel Anthony Tenser; 10 August 1920; London, England
- Died: 5 December 2007 (aged 87); Southport, Merseyside, England
- Years active: 1961–2007

Samuel Anthony Tenser (10 August 1920 – 5 December 2007) was an English film producer. He began as the producer of low budget exploitation films before moving into mainstream productions, co-founding Tigon British Film Productions in the mid-1960s.

== Life and career ==
Tenser was born in London to a family of Lithuanian-Jewish descent, in 1920. Raised in a tenement in Shoreditch, with the family doing piecework for local tailors, Tenser was one of seven children. After war service as a technician in the Royal Air Force, he became a trainee manager for the ABC Cinemas circuit. Working as head of publicity for Miracle Films, Tenser coined the term "sex kitten" for the French movie star Brigitte Bardot when The Light Across the Street (1955) was released in the UK.

In 1960, with business partner Michael Klinger, he opened the Compton Cinema Club, a private members club. Initially the distributors of foreign films, they diversified into production in partnership with the owners of the Cameo chain of cinema, and founded Compton Cameo Films. The first film of the new company was Naked as Nature Intended (1961), a nudist film.

Tenser and Klinger established the Compton Group as a vehicle for their film-making ambitious, and amongst their early productions were Repulsion (1965) and Cul-de-sac (1966), the first two films in English made by the Polish director Roman Polanski. Tenser left the Group in 1966 and founded his own production company Tigon British Film Productions in 1966, which made other mainstream films such as Michael Reeves' two features The Sorcerers (1966) and Witchfinder General (1967), as well as other horror films. After production of The Creeping Flesh (1973) concluded, Tenser resigned from Tigon. Following his last film as executive producer, Frightmare (1974), he retired from the film industry.

With his much younger third wife, he settled in Southport in 1978; the couple later separated, and Tenser spent his last years in a care home opposite the house he had shared with his wife.

Tenser's career as a film producer was extensively documented in the book Beasts in the Cellar: The Exploitation Film Career of Tony Tenser published by Fab Press in 2005 and well received by reviewers in The New York Times and The Independent. The book was written by film critic John Hamilton, who conducted over 18 hours of taped conversations with Tenser, as well as exclusive interviews with many of the actors and craftsmen he employed, including: the directors Michael Armstrong, Peter Sasdy, Freddie Francis and Vernon Sewell; and actors Christopher Lee, Spike Milligan, Julie Ege and Norman Wisdom. Hamilton also had access to original production files and correspondence.

== Partial filmography ==
- Naked - As Nature Intended (1961)
- My Bare Lady (1962)
- That Kind of Girl (1963)
- The Yellow Teddybears (1963)
- Saturday Night Out (1964)
- The Black Torment (1964)
- London in the Raw (1964)
- The Pleasure Girls (1965)
- Primitive London (1965)
- A Study in Terror (1965)
- Repulsion (1965)
- Cul-de-Sac (1966)
- Secrets of a Windmill Girl (1966)
- The Projected Man (1966)
- The Sorcerers (1967)
- Witchfinder General (1968)
- The Blood Beast Terror (1968)
- Curse of the Crimson Altar (1968)
- Love in Our Time (1968)
- What's Good for the Goose (1968)
- The Haunted House of Horror (1968)
- Zeta One (1969)
- The Body Stealers (1969)
- Monique (1970)
- The Blood on Satan's Claw (1970)
- Black Beauty (1971)
- Hannie Caulder (1971)
- Doomwatch (1972)
- The Creeping Flesh (1973)
- Not Now, Darling (1973)
- Frightmare (1974)
