= Nudes of the World =

1961 British naturist film by Arnold Louis Miller

- Opening titles
- Directed by: Arnold Louis Miller
- Written by: Arnold Louis Miller
- Produced by: Stanley Long
- Starring: Vivienne Raimon
- Narrated by: Valerie Singleton
- Cinematography: Stanley Long
- Production company: Miracle-Searchlight
- Distributed by: Miracle
- Release date: November 1961
- Running time: 65 mins
- Country: United Kingdom
- Language: English

Nudes of the World (also known as Nudes of All Nations) is a 1961 British naturist film directed and written by Arnold Louis Miller and starring Vivienne Raimon.

== Plot ==
A group of international beauty contestants rent a temporarily vacant stately home and open a nudist camp, much to the dismay of the local villagers. When the estate's owner returns, it turns out he is a naturist, and is able to placate the angry locals.

== Cast ==
- Valerie Singleton as narrator
- Vivienne Raimon as Carol Wilson
- Antony Dell as Ron
- Colin Goddard as Peter
- Joyce Gregg as Mrs Haines
- Geoffrey Denton as Lord Greystone
- Douglas Cameron as Sergeant Roberts
- Stephanie Rovert as Helen
- Monique Ammon as Miss France
- Julia Nicholaides as Miss Greece
- Susan Clift as Miss Germany
- Janet Ash as Miss New Zealand
- Sue Chang as Miss Hong Kong
- Marguerita Lopez as Miss Mexico
- Jutka Goz as Miss Hungary
- Elaine Desmond as Miss United States
- Minush Fabina as Miss Brazil
- Elizabeth Standing as Miss Holland
- Diana Dorlay as Miss Denmark
- Chantal Farve as Miss Belgium
- Larry Taylor as village lout
- Ivor Phillips as village lout
- Peter Baker as compère

== Reception ==
=== Box office ===
Kine Weekly wrote: "Miracle's Nudes Of The World" (British), supported by House of Sin (Miracle-French), has shattered house records, despite snow and ice, in Birmingham and Manchester. The circuits are going for this one."

=== Critical ===
The Monthly Film Bulletin wrote: "Innocuous nudist romp, dimly written and acted, culminating in a glowingly Eastman Coloured firework display."
