= Secrets of a Windmill Girl =

1966 British film by Arnold L. Miller

- British quad poster
- Directed by: Arnold L. Miller
- Written by: Arnold L. Miller
- Produced by: Arnold L Miller; Stanley A. Long executive Michael Klinger; Tony Tenser
- Starring: Pauline Collins; April Wilding; Renée Houston; Derek Bond; Harry Fowler; Peter Gordeno
- Cinematography: Stanley A. Long
- Music by: Malcolm Lockyer
- Production company: Searchlight
- Distributed by: Compton
- Release date: 1966
- Country: UK
- Language: English

Secrets of a Windmill Girl is a 1966 British sexploitation film directed by Arnold L. Miller and starring Pauline Collins, April WIlding and Renée Houston. It recounts the road to ruin of a young woman who becomes involved with the striptease scene after becoming a dancer at the Windmill Theatre in London. The film features fan dances by former Windmill Theatre Company performers. It was originally released in Britain as part of a double bill with Naked as Nature Intended (1961).

== Plot ==
The story is told in flashback, as sometime nightclub singer Linda Gray recounts the story of her doomed ex-best friend Pat.

== Cast ==
- Pauline Collins as Pat Lord
- April Wilding as Linda Grey
- Renée Houston as Molly, dresser
- Derek Bond as Inspector Thomas
- Harry Fowler as Harry
- Howard Marion-Crawford as Richard, producer
- Peter Gordeno as Peter
- Peter Swanwick as Len Mason
- Martin Jarvis as Mike, Windmill stage manager
- Leon Cortez as Uncle Marty

== Music ==
Malcolm Lockyer composed the score, from which a suite was extracted. Valerie Mitchell's single "The Windmill Girls", composed by Sidney Gilbert, was used as the theme tune for the film. Mitchell was a singer and cabaret dancer, the sister of former Windmill girl Janie Jones. Dana Gillespie, aged 17 in only her second film appearance, sings and plays guitar in several brief extracts.

== Critical reception ==
The Monthly Film Bulletin wrote: "There is virtually nothing one can say about this film except that one has seen it all before. Ethically it is as dubious and naive as most; the hygienic, hard-working happiness of the average Windmill girl is one of the film's more tiresome propositions; the direction is non-existent. Pauline Collins is an attractive, spirited Pat."

Kine Weekly wrote: "The chief ingredient of this effort is a stage show of underclad cuties. Most of the stage ensembles are picturesque and colourful, but one fan-dance is very like another and here there certainly is more than ample sufficiency. Occasionally the camera leaves the stage to visit a party where the girls are ogled by designing young men, but it is on stage where the real interest lies. The two leading parts are well played by April Wilding, as the narrator, and Pauline Collins, who meets such an early death. Acting is not the film's strong point, undressing is the main concern of the girls, but guest stars Derek Bond, Renée Houston, Howard Marion Crawford and Harry Fowler pull their weight. With the Windmill tag it should intrigue the masses, who are promised a good leg-show for their money."

TV Guide wrote that "the premise of this film is compelling, but the treatment is empty-headed".

The Spinning Image asked, "and those hoping for titillation? As with so much of the sexually-themed cinema of this (British) nation, they were offered it with a moralistic angle, as if telling the audience off for their prurience."
