= Saturday Night Out =

1964 British film by Robert Hartford-Davis

- Directed by: Robert Hartford-Davis
- Written by: Derek Ford; Donald Ford
- Produced by: Michael Klinger; Tony Tenser
- Starring: Heather Sears; John Bonney; Bernard Lee
- Cinematography: Peter Newbrook
- Edited by: Alastair McIntyre
- Music by: Robert Richards
- Production companies: Compton Films; Tekli British Productions
- Distributed by: Compton-Cameo Films (UK)
- Release date: April 1964 (UK)
- Running time: 100 minutes
- Country: United Kingdom
- Language: English

Saturday Night Out is a 1964 British comedy-drama film directed by Robert Hartford-Davis and starring Heather Sears, John Bonney, Bernard Lee, Erika Remberg, Francesca Annis, Margaret Nolan and David Lodge. It was written by Derek Ford and Donald Ford. It is known for its portrayal of early Swinging London.

== Plot ==
A trio of merchant seamen and several passengers disembark from their ship when it arrives at the Pool of London and go out for a Saturday night's entertainment in the city.

== Cast ==
- Heather Sears as Penny
- John Bonney as Lee
- Bernard Lee as George Hudson
- Erika Remberg as Wanda
- Colin Campbell as Jamey
- Francesca Annis as Jean
- Inigo Jackson as Harry
- Vera Day as Arlene
- Caroline Mortimer as Marline
- Margaret Nolan as Julie
- David Lodge as Arthur
- Nigel Green as Paddy
- Toni Gilpin as Margaret
- Barbara Roscoe as Miss Bingo
- Martine Beswick as barmaid
- Patricia Hayes as Edie's mother
- Derek Bond as Paul
- Freddie Mills as Joe
- The Searchers as themselves
- David Burke as manager
- Shirley Cameron as Edie
- Patsy Fagan as barmaid
- Gerry Gibson as doorman
- Barry Langford as barman
- Janet Milner as waitress
- Wendy Newton as Kathy
- Jack Taylor as landlord

== Production ==
The film was an independent production shot at Shepperton Studios and on location around London. Locations in East London include Pennyfields, Poplar High Street and West India Dock Road. The film's set were designed by the art director Peter Proud.

== Critical reception ==
Monthly Film Bulletin wrote: "Routine multi-stranded story of sailors on the town – meeting nice girls, meeting floozy girls, getting drunk, being robbed and so forth. Both script and direction, though striving hard to inject a flavouring of sex and wit, are colourless; but the acting is in general rather better than anything else in the film."

Variety said: " Robert Hartford Davis is a sound director, but Saturday Night Out has fallen apart mainly because of poor, undistinguished dialog and predictable situations. There are some good glimpses of thesping, and locales are satisfactorily presented. ... Hartford-Davis has done a routine but uninspired job as director and producer. Perhaps the greatest disappointment in the film is the appearance of Miss Sears, after a longish layoff, in a role which gives poor scope for her talent."

The New Statesman wrote: "Consistently ridiculous, Saturday Night Out is the latest thing to come from that egregious team who gave us The Yellow Teddybears. In this one Robert Hartford-Davis follows the fortunes of four disembarked matelots and a passenger (Bernard Lee), separately hotfoot after a bit of you-know-what in and around London's square-mile of vice. The lackadaisical direction, particularly inept in a kind of Christopher Robin interlude with a girl beatnik that is patently there to lend both tone and scope to an otherwise sordid outing, incredibly sharpens during a little descent into a Soho clip-joint – admonitory and marvellously played."
