= Richard Bebb =

English actor (1927–2006)

- Born: 12 January 1927; London, England
- Died: 12 April 2006 (aged 79); London
- Other name: Richard Bebb Williams
- Education: Highgate School, Trinity College, Cambridge
- Occupation: Actor
- Spouse: Gwen Watford (m. 1952–1994; her death)

Richard Bebb (12 January 1927 – 12 April 2006) was an English actor of stage, screen and radio.

Born Richard Bebb Williams in London, he changed his name to his mother's surname, Bebb, when he took up acting as there was already a British actor called Richard Williams. Bebb's father Herbert Edward Williams was a physician whose practice was run from part of St Mary's Lodge, the family's impressive home in Stoke Newington. Bebb was educated at Highgate School in North London, and attended Trinity College, Cambridge from 1944–1947.

In 1952, he married actress Gwen Watford (1927–1994), who predeceased him.

Bebb was a prolific performer in theatre, television and radio, probably most famously as "Second Voice" in the original 1954 BBC Radio broadcast of Dylan Thomas's Under Milk Wood, opposite Richard Burton's "First Voice".

On television, he appeared in early televised Shakespeare to Dial 999, Z-Cars, Dixon of Dock Green, Blake's 7, Softly, Softly (TV series), and a long running role in the soap-opera serial Compact. Throughout the 1990s he was frequently in the Poirot series.

He also appeared in several films, such as Pope Joan (1972) and King Ralph (1991).

== Music interest and record collection ==
Bebb was an avid collector of 78 rpm gramophone records. He was a committee member of the British Institute of Recorded Sound, a forerunner to the British Library Sound Archive, and oversaw the launch of Historic Masters, a vinyl record label dedicated to issuing rare 78 rpm recordings of historic opera singers. His personal collection included recordings of singers and opera performances in England, as well as the Henry Irving cylinder recordings which he rediscovered. He did not favour discs based on established values and reputation, but judged singers on their musical merit. His favourite opera was Adriana Lecouvreur by Francesco Cilea. Among singers and performances he had high regard for Dino Borgioli's Do not go, my love, Frida Leider's version of Eboli's aria in Don Carlos, and Magda Olivero's Sola, perduta, abbandonata.

== Filmography ==
Year	Title	Role	Notes
1953	The Final Test	Frank Weller	Uncredited
1963	That Kind of Girl		
1963	A Matter of Choice	Walter	
1963	The Yellow Teddy Bears	Frank Lang	
1972	Pope Joan	Lord of Manor	
1985	Sacred Hearts		Voice
1987	Born of Fire	Newsreader	
1991	King Ralph	Gamekeeper	

== See also ==
- Paul Getty, music collector
- Michael Scott, music critic
