= Captain Universe (British comics) =

British comic book character

- The cover to Captain Universe #2, art by Mick Anglo.

Publication information
- Publisher: Arnold Book Company
- First appearance: Captain Universe #1 (1954)
- Created by: Mick Anglo

In-story information
- Alter ego: Jim Logan
- Species: Enhanced human
- Place of origin: Earth
- Abilities: Flight; Enhanced strength Enhanced durability
Captain Universe
Publication information
- Schedule: Monthly
- Format: Ongoing series
- Publication date: 1954
- No. of issues: 2

Captain Universe is a fictional British superhero who appeared in comic books published by Arnold Book Company (also known as ABC, not to be confused with America's Best Comics) in 1954. The character was created by Mick Anglo; like his other creations of the era (Marvelman, Captain Miracle, Miracle Man) Captain Universe was heavily influenced by Fawcett Publications' Captain Marvel.

== Creation ==
Arnold Miller was the son of publisher Len Miller, and originally worked for him at L. Miller & Son, Ltd. before founding his own Arnold Book Company in 1948. Despite its name, the company primarily produced comics rather than books, particularly reprints of Fawcett and EC Comics stories imported from America. For new material ABC turned to Mick Anglo's Gower Street studios, who already worked with his father's company. Anglo produced two successful science fiction titles for ABC, Ace Molloy of the Special Squadron (1952 - 1954) and Space Comics (1953 - 1954) before being commissioned to create a superhero title to compete with the successful Marvelman and Young Marvelman titles.

Anglo's response was Captain Universe, heavily based on the same Captain Marvel template as Marvelman. A slight twist was added to better tie the strip into science fiction rather than fantasy; instead of possessing the attributes of six mythical elders, Captain Universe's powers were derived from real-life scientific figures Galileo, Archimedes, Leonardo da Vinci, Aristotle and Pythagoras. This led to the character calling out "Galap" to change form. Captain Universe's alter ego was also made a scientist - Jim Logan of the United Nations Interplanetary Division. It has been suggested this background was influenced by the hugely popular BBC television series The Quatermass Experiment.

== Publishing history ==
Captain Universe headlined his own monthly comic, which also featured other strips featuring detective Mike Miller and cowboy Rocky Colt. The title was short lived; many sources state it only ran for a single issue in 1954 but a second issue has surfaced. The title's cancellation has been attributed to legal action, though it is unclear who this was from. Arnold Miller subsequently wound down the company following a press outcry over the horror content of his EC reprint titles, ending most of the comics by 1955 and folding the company entirely in 1958. Anglo meanwhile would mine the Captain Marvel archetype further for Super Hombre in 1958 and Captain Miracle in 1961.

Subsequently, the character languished in obscurity for decades and lapsed into the public domain. As a result, Captain Universe was selected by Alan Moore for an appearance in The League of Extraordinary Gentlemen, Volume IV: The Tempest in 2018. Captain Universe was featured as part of the Seven Stars, a team of public domain superheroes active in Britain in the fifties, alongside Marsman, Zom of the Zodiac, Satin Astro, Captain Zenith, Electro Girl and Vull the Invisible. The series also portrayed him as the brother of Amalgamated Press character Jet-Ace Logan.

Despite being in the public domain like the rest of the characters in The League of Extraordinary Gentlemen series, Mick Anglo's role as Captain Universe's creator was uniquely acknowledged in the issue's credits, Moore having sought out his permission before his death.

== Fictional character biography ==
United Nations Interplanetary Division scientist Jim Logan devises an electrical treatment that draws power from the far reaches of space, giving him the ability to turn into the superhuman Captain Universe when he calls out "galap". He is able to draw on the galactic knowledge of Galileo, Archimedes' physics expertise, Da Vinci's inventing skills, Aristotle's mastery of philosophy and Pythagorus' [sic] (Note: Pythagoras was spelt incorrectly in the comic itself.) geometry talents. He also has super-strength and is capable of flight, and defends Earth from galactic threats.
