= Mick Anglo =

British comic book writer, editor and artist

- Born: Maurice Anglowitz; 19 June 1916 Bow, London, England
- Died: 31 October 2011 (aged 95)
- Areas: Writer, Artist, Letterer
- Pseudonym: Johnny Dekker
- Notable works: Marvelman

Michael Anglo (born Maurice Anglowitz, 19 June 1916 – 31 October 2011) was a British comic book writer, editor and artist, as well as an author. He was best known for creating the superhero Marvelman, later known as Miracleman.

== Biography ==
=== Early life and military service ===
Born in Bow, London, of Russian Jewish descent, Mick Anglo was educated at the Central Foundation School and John Cass Art School, both in London. On leaving school he freelanced in fashion and commercial art until 1939, and first drew cartoons for SEAC, the official army newspaper for South East Asia Command in 1942, then for newspapers in Singapore in 1945.

=== 1947–1952: Martin & Reid, Paget Publications and Arnold Book Company ===
After completing his National Service, he became an author for a small publishing company, Martin & Reid, producing westerns, romance books and crime thrillers with titles such as "Guns & Gamblers", "My Gun Speaks For Me"/"Muscles For Hire" (1951), and "Broadway Glamour", under the pen-name Johnny Dekker. (Note: A number of sources mistake Anglo's pen name "Johnny Dekker" as the character name for one of his fictional detective characters.) He also drew a small number of short humorous comic strips for the publisher John Matthew during 1946, and for two other companies, Rayburn and A. Solway in 1948. After illustrating the book jacket for one of his own novels, Martin and Reid suggested he develop strips for their comics line, and he worked on their comics imprint between 1948 and 1950; editing the line and writing and drawing western, adventure and science fiction strips and titles.

He also produced a number of one-off stories contemporaneously with his Martin and Reid work for Paget Publications, one of the smaller British comics imprints of the day; producing short run, often single issue, titles containing a number of stories. Although contributing mainly short humor strips, Anglo's creations for Paget Publications included an early British superhero, Wonderman, who appeared for 24 issues in his own title from 1948 to 1951. Between 1950 and 1952 Anglo produced a number of strips for publisher Arnold Miller's Arnold Book Company, on stories such as "Captain Valiant" (in Space Comics) and "Ace Malloy of the Special Squadron", while concurrently producing Space Commando Comics, featuring "Space Commander Kerry", for L. Miller and Son, a major British comics company run by Arnold Miller's father, Leonard Miller (Note: Arnold was also the and Son in L. Miller and Son as well as running his own comics publication company.) and still writing novels for Martin and Reid.

=== 1954–1960 – L. Miller & Son, Gower Street Studios and Marvelman ===
Early in 1954 Anglo opened his own comics production company, Gower Studios, in Gower Street, London. As "an old school editorial packager", Anglo's studio created "packets" for various publishers, usually comprising the entire content of a publication; and Mick Anglo Limited was incorporated on 21 August 1954 for the purpose of Artistic and literary creation. Anglo and his staff of British artists, including Don Lawrence (who was given his first break in drawing comics by Anglo), Bob Monkhouse, Denis Gifford, Ron Embleton and George Stokes and Janet Rasmussen had a hand in the creation of many British independent comic books and magazines between 1954 and 1963. "I employed a pretty large staff of freelancers: scriptwriters and artists. Most of the artists had just come out of the Forces, and were looking for something to do".

In 1954 Anglo created the character he is best known for, Marvelman. Since the mid-1940s L. Miller and Son had successfully reprinted American comic book company Fawcett Comics' Captain Marvel, Mary Marvel, and Captain Marvel Jr stories in the UK. However, in 1953 Fawcett were party to a protracted lawsuit brought by National Comics (now DC Comics) claiming plagiarism of their Superman character. Fawcett cancelled their Captain Marvel titles, leaving Leonard Miller without reprint material for their best-selling British titles. Miller approached Mick Anglo to create a replacement; "One day Leonard Miller phoned and said he wanted to see me urgently. His supply of the American material for the Captain Marvel series had suddenly been cut off. Had I any ideas? ... So I quickly told him I had plenty of ideas, and for my trouble I received a regular supply of work for the next six years." Anglo replaced the Captain Marvel Family with almost identical characters, Marvelman and Young Marvelman.

Initially Anglo drew the titles himself, but later to meet the demand (both were weekly publications) Anglo developed a system similar to that later famously used by Stan Lee of Marvel Comics - he would give one of the artists a loose plot outline rather than a detailed script; the artist would then draw the story, and Anglo would tailor the dialogue accordingly, lettering the work himself. Marvelman and Young Marvelman actually increased in sales compared to their predecessors, with both titles burgeoning a fan club and hardback annuals. Marvelman became the "best-loved and best-known British superhero" and the longest-running British superhero. In 1956 a third title, Marvelman Family was launched, adding Kid Marvelman (previously introduced as a back-up feature in Marvelman). Between 1954 and 1960 Anglo would be the main writer for all three titles, producing a vast number of stories. However, in November 1959 a ban on importing American comics for the British market was lifted, and the black-and-white L. Miller & Son comics would struggle to compete. From 1960 - with #335 of both Marvelman and Young Marvelman the titles switched to a monthly reprint format, and Anglo began to look for work elsewhere.

Parallel to Marvelman, Anglo had gained further mileage from the Marvelman material; in 1954 Anglo wrote two issues of Captain Universe for Arnold Books, a near-identical character to Captain Marvel and Marvelman. (Note: Captain Universe uses a magic word, "Galap", to gain superhuman powers, just as Captain Marvel's "Shazam" and Marvelman's "Kimota.") As well as the Marvelman family of titles, in the mid-1950s Anglo took over a number of L. Miller's established American reprint titles, continuing the series Jim Bowie, Annie Oakley, and Davy Crockett utilising both the English artists from his studios and a number of Spanish artists. He also created the character Superhombre for Spanish publisher Editorial Ferma in 1958; the new hero was a third reworking of the Captain Marvel template.

=== 1960–1967 – Anglo Features, Thorpe & Porter ===
Turning down an offer to again work for Arnold Miller, he set up his own Anglo Features imprint from Gower Studios, launching Captain Miracle,; Battle, Gunhawks Western and TV Features, the last of which contained reprints of material produced by the Studio for L. Miller. None of the titles lasted more than 10 monthly issues between October 1960 and June 1961; after which Anglo Comics folded. Anglo next adapted three stories by Edgar Allan Poe, Oscar Wilde and Wilkie Collins for the British Classics Illustrated imprint of publishers Thorpe & Porter, a company for which he also devised a number of 68-page hardback annuals based on television series The Avengers, Charles Rand, and Danger Man. During 1965–1966, Anglo produced thirteen issues of Miracle Man for Thope & Porter's Top Sellers imprint – which actually consisted of reworked Super Hombre material made for the Spanish market.

Anglo was then approached by John Spencer & Co, a company that had produced crime and western books since the 1940s, latterly under the sobriquet Badger Books, to launch a series of comics. Four titles appeared in 1966, Fantasy Stories, Macabre Stories, Spectre Stories and Strange Stories, featuring, among other stories, a number of reworked strips by Gower Studios artists Ron Embleton and Bill Merrill, Spaceman (originally produced for Gould/Norman Light Publishing). With low production values, the John Spencer titles were not a success, and all folded within the year after six issues. (Note: Further John Spencer titles published in 1967 were not Anglo productions.)

Anglo then edited City Magazines Ltd's TV series-based weekly comic TV Tornado in 1967 and contributed the short-run strips Voyage to the Bottom of the Sea and Green Hornet, before returning to Top Sellers and packaging reprints of DC Comics material, including Superman, Wonder Woman and the Batman newspaper strip, for their Super DC anthology series in 1969/1970.

=== Later career ===
Anglo then worked on the weekly Look & Cook magazine in the late 1960s, co-wrote a small number of cookery books, and was a joke writer for comedian Tommy Cooper. He has also written a series of nostalgic books looking back at the decades from the 1930s–1950s, with a companion duo of quiz books, a book about Victorian magazines, "Penny Dreadfuls and other Victorian Horrors", and one on cannibalism, "Man Eats Man: The Story of Cannibalism", together with a small number of stories or features for Fleetway/IPC's war comics output between 1979 and 1983, before retiring during the 1980s.

=== Marvelman/Miracleman revivals ===
Anglo had nothing to do with the revival of the Marvelman character in 1982 by Alan Moore for Quality Communications' anthology Warrior. The magazine's editor Dez Skinn, an acquaintance of Anglo, said "He wasn't crazy about our revamp, but he really didn't care either way." When asked about it in 2001, Anglo said "Dez contacted me and he wanted to revive it and I said go ahead and do what you like.". The revival went on hiatus in 1985 following a disagreement between writer Alan Moore and artist Alan Davis, and Warrior was cancelled soon afterwards. The strip had also attracted attention from Marvel Comics over Quality Communications' Marvelman Special (June 1984), which meant when the series was continued by American publisher Eclipse Comics it was renamed Miracleman. In addition to original material and Warrior reprints, Eclipse also occasionally used coloured vintage Anglo strips, for which he would receive royalties - though he recalled Eclipse were "Very dodgy to deal with" and that they "messed it up as usual".

The character became "mired in a legal quagmire" between 1993 and 2009, preventing further reprint or new character development opportunities. The situation was not helped by ownership doubts, not clarified by Anglo's contractual relationship to L. Miller and Son and their status as a company.

Eventually, in 2009, Marvel Comics purchased the rights to Marvelman from Mick Anglo having established that Anglo owned the rights to the character. Alan Moore observed "I'm very happy for this book to get published – because that means money will finally go to Marvelman's creator, Mick Anglo, and to his wife ... The main thing is that I will feel happy to know that Mick Anglo is finally getting the recompense he so richly deserves." Anglo would however die before any of Alan Moore's material would be reprinted.

Marvel CEO and publisher Dan Buckley stated "It is an honor to work with Mick Anglo to bring his creation to a larger audience than ever before." A press release quoted Mick Anglo as saying, "I did not think it would ever happen. It's a wonderful thing to see my creation finally back." Marvel's first release after acquiring the rights was the Marvelman Classic Primer in June 2010, which featured pin-ups, text pieces and excerpts from a meeting between the 93-year old Anglo and Joe Quesada. A limited series of Anglo reprints - Marvelman: Family's Finest - and a short-lived set of chronological archive volumes soon followed.

=== Death ===
Anglo died on 31 October 2011 at age 95.

== Bibliography ==
=== Comics ===
The following is an incomplete list of those stories/comics known to have been written, drawn or edited by Mick Anglo:

- "Ace High" (The Sheriff and Elmo's Own #2, Screen Stories Publications, 1949)
- "Ace High, Special Investigator" (Merry-Go-Round #5, Martin and Reid, 1947)
- "Ace Malloy of the Special Squadron" #50–65? (Arnold Books, 1950–1952?)
- "Alfie the Elfin" (Paget's Bumper Tot's Comic, Paget Publications, 1950)
- "Andy the Office Boy" (Jolly Chuckles #6, Martin and Reid, 1948)
- "Arresto" (Happy Yank #1, Rayburn 1948)
- The Avengers (Thorpe and Porter, 1966) 68-page TV tie-in annual
- "Barney Clouter" (Happy Yank No. 1, Rayburn 1948)
- Battle #1–9 (Anglo Features, November 1960 – July 1961)
- "Bilbo" (All-Fun Comics v6#3, Soloway, 1948)
- "Boyo" (Paget's Spree Comics, Paget Publications, 1948)
- "Brace Morgan" (The Pioneer Western Comic, Wyndham House, 1950)
- "Buffalo Bill" (The Pioneer Western Comic, Wyndham House, 1950)
- "The Candy Kid" (Squibs Fun Comic, Martin and Reid, 1949)
- "The Canterville Ghost" (Classics Illustrated No. 150, UK Edition, 1962) adaptation of Oscar Wilde story
- "Cap'n Scamp and Flamper" (The Comic Wonder No. 2, Paget Publications, 1948) (reprinted in The Paget Pinnacle Comic, Paget Publications 1949)
- "Captain Justice" (Dynamic, Paget Publications, 1949)
- "Captain Miracle" #1–9 (Anglo Comics, 1960–1961) editor/artist (redrawn Marvelman stories)
- "Captain Savage" (The Windjammer, Martin and Reid, 1950)
- Captain Zenith (Martin and Reid, 1950) editor/artist
- Cartoon Capers Comic (Martin and Reid, 1949) editor/artist
- "Charles Cole's Magic Chalks" (Captain Zenith, Martin and Reid, 1950) (Power Comic, Martin and Reid, 1950)
- Charles Rand (Note: Subtitled," The number one man from SUNDAY – Special United Nations Defense Agents, Y Section (The section of men licensed to kill).") (Thorpe and Porter, 1966) 68-page TV tie-in annual
- "Chuck Chance" (Power Comics, Martin and Reid, 1950)
- "Colonel Braggs" (The Paget Plus Comic, Paget Publications, 1948)
- "Colonel Jodhpur" (Merry-Go-Round No. 5, 1947, Martin and Reid)
- The Comic Ledger (Martin and Reid, 1949) editor/artist
- "Crackey" (Merry-Go-Round No. 5, Martin and Reid, 1947)
- "Dan Druff" (The Paget Pageant Comic, Paget Publications, 1948) (The Paget Prince of Comics, Paget Publications, 1949)
- "Danger Inc" (Jolly Adventures No. 4, Martin and Reid, 1948)
- Danger Man (Thorpe and Porter, 1966) 68-page TV tie-in annual
- "The Dangermen" (Battle Picture Weekly 15 September 1979–?, Fleetway/IPC)
- Davy Crockett #1–50 (L. Miller, 1956–1960)
- "The Dead Men of Calais" (Battle Picture Library #1583, Fleetway/IPC, 1983)
- "Dick and Flick" (Funny Tuppence No. 2, John Matthew, 1947)
- "Doc Quacker" (The Comic Ledger, Martin and Reid, 1949)
- "Dr. Knewall (Happy Yank No. 1, Rayburn, 1948)
- Fantasy Stories 1–6? (John Spencer, 1966) editor/artist
- "Fido" (The Paget Prince of Comics, Paget Publications, 1949)
- "Frosh" (The Comic Wonder No. 7, Paget Publications, 1949)
- "Froshy" (Amazing Comics, Modern Fiction, 1949)
- "Fun and Larks at St. Narks" (The Premier No. 5, Paget Publications, 1948)
- The Funfair Comic (Martin and Reid, 1949) editor/artist
- The Funstar Comic (Martin and Reid, 1949) editor/artist
- "Gail Garrity" (Dynamic, Paget Publications, 1949) (Oh Boy! and Wonderman No. 22, Paget Publications, 1951)
- "Glup" (The Premier No. 7, Paget Publications, 1948)
- "The Gold Bug" (Classics Illustrated No. 84, UK Edition, 1962) adaptation of Edgar Allan Poe story
- "Good Deed Gus" (The Paget Parade Comic, Paget Publications, 1949)
- "Green Hornet" (T.V. Tornado #7–17, No. 19, City Magazines Ltd, 1967)
- "Grey Fowl" (Merry-Go-Round No. 5, Martin and Reid, 1947)
- "Gunhawks Western" #1–10 (Anglo Comics, 1960–1961) editor
- "Gusher" (The Outpost Adventure Comic, Martin and Reid, 1950)
- "Gypsey Doodle" (Merry-Go-Round No. 5, Martin and Reid, 1947)
- "Hank Riley" (Happy Yank No. 1, Rayburn, 1948)
- "Harmless Horace" (The Comics Wonder No. 2, 1948)
- "Happy Joe" (The Paget Plus Comic, Paget Publications, 1948)
- Happy Yank #1–3 (Rayburn, 1948) editor/artist
- "Indian Justice" (The Pioneer Western Comic No. 2, Wyndham House, 1950)
- "Jesse James" (Jolly Western, Martin and Reid, 1948)
- "Johnny Jules" (The Windjammer, Martin and Reid, 1950)
- "Johnny Tiddler" (Paget's Bumper Tot's Comic, Paget Publications, 1950)
- Jolly Western #5–9 (Martin and Reid, 1948–49) editor/artist
- "Kamba the Jungle Boy" (The Pioneer Western Comic, Wyndham House, 1950)
- "Ken Dale" (The Scoop Western, Martin and Reid, 1950)
- "Kid Kelly" (The Windjammer, Martin and Reid, 1950)
- "Killer Miller" (Jolly Western No. 6, Martin and Reid, 1948)
- Kit Marain (Martin and Reid, 1949) editor/artist (Note: Sometimes erroneously referred to in sources as Kit Morain.)
- "Koko the Clown" (Happy Moments No. 1, John Matthew, 1946)
- "Konga" (Cartoons Capers Comic, Martin and Reid, 1949) (The Rancher, Martin and Reid, 1949) (The Outpost Adventure Comic, Martin and Reid, 1951)
- "Lance Riordan" (Captain Zenith, Martin and Reid, 1950)
- The Lariat (Martin and Reid, 1949) editor/artist
- "Lejeune of the Legion" (The Outpost Adventure Comic, Martin and Reid, 1950)
- "Les North" (The Rancher, Martin and Reid, 1949)
- "Little Clancy" (Paget's Bumper Tot's Comic, Paget Publications, 1950)
- "Little Tich and Tichy" (The Premier No. 6, Paget Publications, 1948)
- Macabre Stories
- "Mac Riordan (The Lariat, Martin and Reid, 1949)
- "Malu" (The Windjammer Martin and Reid, 1950)
- "Marji the Jungle Girl" (The Lariat, Martin and Reid, 1949) (The Scoop Western, Martin and Reid, 1950)
- "Malloy of the Mounties" (Captain Zenith, Martin and Reid, 1950)
- "Marlowe of the Mounties" (The Pioneer Western Comic, Wyndham House, 1950)
- "Marmaduke" (Jolly Chuckles No. 5, Martin and Reid, 1948)
- "Marshal Zenith" (The Rancher, Martin and Reid, 1949)
- "Martin Power" (Power Comics, Martin and Reid, 1950)
- Marvelman #25–370 (L. Miller, 3 February 1954 – February 1963) numbering continued from Captain Marvel
- Marvelman Adventures (annual) (L. Miller, 1961, 1963)
- Marvelman Annual (L. Miller, 1954–1960)
- Marvelman Family #1–30 (L. Miller, October 1956 – November 1959)
- Marvelman Family Album (L. Miller, 1963)
- Marvelman Jnr Album (L. Miller, 1963)
- Merry-Go-Round (Martin and Reid, 1946–1949) artist #2–8, 10 editor #13–14
- "Meyer" (The Premier No. 7, 1948) (The Paget Pinnacle Comics, Paget Publications, 1949)
- "Mick Jordan, Space Investigator" (Merry-Go-Round No. 4, Martin and Reid, 1947)
- Mick Martin (Martin and Reid, 1949)
- "Mike" (Paget's Snips, Paget Publications, 1948)
- Mick Martin (Martin and Reid, 1949) editor/artist
- Miracle Man #1–13 (Top Sellers, 1965) redrawn Marvelman stories
- Monte Hall Western No. 106 (L. Miller, 1957?) cover artist
- "Mystery at the Farm" (The Pioneer Western Comic, Wyndham House, 1950)
- "Nights of Terror" (Classics Illustrated No. 148, UK Edition, 1962) adaptation of Wilkie Collins story
- "Nip McGee (Wonderman, Paget Publications, 1948) (Oh Boy! and Wonderman, Paget Publications, No. 22, 1951)
- "Norman Harper" (The Funstar Comic, Martin and Reid, 1949) (Wonderman No. 20, Paget Publications, 1950)
- "Ocean Capers" (Paget's Spree Comics, Paget Publications, 1948) (The Premier No. 7, Paget Publications, 1948)
- "Oh, What a Lovely War" (Battle Picture Weekly 28 April 1979 – 8 September 1979, Fleetway/IPC)
- "The Old Soldier" (Battle Picture Library #1364, Fleetway/IPC, 1980)
- "P.C. Percy" (The Paget Picnic Comic, Paget Publications, 1949)
- "Police Patrol" (Power Comics, Martin and Reid, 1950)
- "Potty the Professor" (The Paget Plus Comic, Paget Publications, 1948)
- Power Comic (Martin and Reid, 1950) editor/artist
- The Rancher (Martin and Reid, 1949) editor/artist
- Rangeland Western (Martin and Reid, 1949) editor/artist
- "Razzan" (All-Fun Comics v6#3, A Soloway, 1948)
- "Rex Valiant, Atomic Avenger" (Merry-Go-Round No. 4, Martin and Reid, 1947)
- *"Rip Cord" (Jolly Adventures No. 4, Martin and Reid, 1948)
- "Rockbottom and Pancake" (Comic Capers v6#4, A Soloway, 1948)
- "Rodeo" (The Sheriff and Elmo's Own No. 2, Screen Stories Publications, 1949)
- "Roy the Office Boy" (Paget's Gusto, Paget Publications, 1948)
- "Rub and Dub" (Happy Moments No. 1, John Matthew, 1946)
- "Sam King" (The Lariat, Martin and Reid, 1950)
- "Secret Agent Joe" (Happy Moments No. 1, John Matthew, 1946)
- "Sheriff Johnny Dennis" (The Sheriff and Elmo's Own No. 3, Screen Stories Publications, 1949)
- "Sky Devils" (Battle Picture Library #1427, Fleetway/IPC, 1980)
- "Sleepy Town" (The Comic Wonder No. 3, Paget Publications 1948)
- "Soapy Sam" (Happy Moments No. 1, John Matthew, 1946)
- Space Commander Kerry #50–55 (L. Miller 1953)
- "Space Commander Kerry" (Space Commando Comics #50–59, L. Miller, 1953–1954)
- "Sparky Malone" (Space Commando Comics, L. Miller, 1953–1954)
- Spectre Stories 1–6 (John Spencer, 1966)
- Squibs Fun Comic (Martin and Reid, 1949) editor/artist
- "Stone-Age Pete" (All-Fun Comics v6#4, A Soloway, 1948)
- Strange Stories 1–6 (John Spencer, 1966) editor
- Super DC #1–14 (Top Sellers, June 1969 – July 1970) editor
- Super DC Bumper Book (Top Sellers, 1970) editor
- "Syd Smart and Sonny" (Happy Yank No. 1, Rayburn, 1948)
- "Tancy the Terror" (Happy Yank No. 3, Rayburn, 1949)
- "Tex Reno" (Cartoon Capers Comics, Martin and Reid, 1949)
- "Texas Kid" (Happy Yank No. 1, Rayburn, 1948)
- "Texas Ranger" (Rangeland Western, Martin and Reid, 1949)
- "Timpo Tim" (The Pioneer Western Comic #1–2, Wyndham House, 1950)
- "Tony West" (The Pioneer Western Comic, Wyndham House, 1950)
- "Tornado" #5–12 (Oh Boy! Comics, Paget Publications, 1949–50)
- "Trigger Lee" (Wonderman 1948) (Oh Boy! Comics No. 16, Paget Publications, 1950)
- "True Life Heroes" (Battle Picture Weekly 27 January 1979, 10 February 1979, 24 March 1979, Fleetway/IPC)
- TV Features (Anglo Features, 1960–61) editor/artist
- TV Tornado #1–88 (City Magazines Ltd, 1967–68) editor. Titled 'TV Tornado and Solo' #37–45; World Distributors (Holdings) Ltd published annuals made up of reprints from the ongoing series in the years 1967–1971
- "Vasco Kid" (Jolly Western No. 6, Martin and Reid, 1948) (The Outpost Adventure Comic, Martin and Reid, 1950) (The Scoop Western Martin and Reid, 1950)
- "Vik the Viking" (Happy Moments No. 1, John Matthew, 1946)
- "Voyage to the Bottom of the Sea" (T.V. Tornado #1–6, City Magazines Ltd, 1967)
- "Wally Wolf" (Paget's Bumper Tot's Comic, Paget Publications, 1950)
- "Wild Bill Hickok" (The Pioneer Western Comic No. 2, Wyndham House, 1950)
- "Willy Wong (Happy Yank No. 2, Rayburn 1948) (Merry Moments No. 1, Martin and Reid, 1948)
- The Windjammer (Martin and Reid, 1950) editor/artist
- "Wonderman" #1–24 (Wonderman, 1948–1951, Paget Publications) titled 'Oh Boy! and Wonderman' for issue No. 22 only
- "Wye Wait" (Happy Moments No. 1, John Matthew, 1946)
- "Young Sammy" (The Funfair Comic, Philmar 1949)
- Young Marvelman #25–370 (L. Miller, February 1954 – February 1963) numbering continued from Captain Marvel Jnr.
- Young Marvelman Annual (L. Miller, 1954–1960)
- Young Marvelman Adventures (L. Miller, 1961) annual
- "Zig Wig" (Paget's Bumper Tot's Comic, Paget Publications, 1950)
- "Zip Leroy" (Jolly Adventures No. 4, Martin and Reid, 1948)
- "Zomby" (The Paget Parade Comic, Paget Publications, 1949)

=== Books ===
- International Restaurant Cuisine, Rasmussen, Janet and Anglo, Michael (World Distributors (Manchester) Limited, 1973) ISBN 0-7235-0588-8
- Man Eats Man: The Story of Cannibalism, Anglo, Michael (Jupiter, 1979) ISBN 0-904041-76-X
- Penny Dreadfuls and other Victorian Horrors, Anglo, Michael (Jupiter, 1977) ISBN 0-904041-59-X
- Nostalgia – the 1920s (Jupiter Books)
- Nostalgia – The 1930s (Jupiter Books)
- Nostalgia – the 1940s (Jupiter Books)
- Nostalgia – the 1950s (Jupiter Books)
- The Forties Quiz Book (New English Library, 1978) ISBN 0-450-03841-6
- The Thirties Quiz Book (New English Library, 1978) ISBN 0-450-03840-8
