= Joan Craven =

English photographer (1897–1979)

- Born: 5 November 1897; Leeds, Yorkshire, England
- Died: 2 July 1979 (aged 81); Tamerton Foliot, England
- Occupation: Photographer
- Years active: 1920s–1960s

Joan Craven (5 November 1897 – 2 July 1979) was an English photographer known for her portraits, artistic studies, advertising, and nudes.

== Early life ==
Joan Mabel Craven was born Mabel Craven on 5 November 1897 in Headingley, Leeds, Yorkshire, the second of six children to Marshall Craven, a brewery clerk and bookkeeper, and his wife Lucy, née Lawson. While Joan was still a child, the family moved to Seacombe, Wallasey, on the Wirral Peninsula, where her father worked as a dairyman.

== Career ==
Craven moved to London and trained under society photographer Dorothy Wilding, and by late 1925, had "pictured thousands of society and stage beauties." In 1926, she opened her own studio on New Bond Street. Her early subjects included dancers, actresses and musicians, including Yvonne Arnaud, Harriet Cohen, Alexandra Danilova, Lydia Sokolova, Tamara Karsavina and Anton Dolin. She entered photographic competitions, winning the open portraiture and figure category at the International Photographic Competition held in Bath in 1927. Her work was shown in both group and solo exhibitions. Her portraits and artistic studies appeared frequently during the 1920s and 1930s in society journals such as The Sketch, Tatler, The Graphic, The Sphere and the Bystander, with The Sketch describing her as "the brilliant young society photographer whose artistic camera-studies are so well known to "Sketch" readers." She was one of the few women photographers involved in advertising in the 1920s and 1930s, and her work was "acclaimed for its dramatic lighting and unusual compositional strategies." Her clients included Cadbury chocolate, Condor hats, De Reszke cigarettes, Pond's cold cream, and Pears soap. "Her advertising pictures ... [were] familiar to all, and her unerring choice of the right model [was] unmistakable".

In the 1950s and 1960s, frustrated with the restrictions of advertising, she concentrated on figure photography, specialising in female nudes. She was described as "[p]robably the most famous female exponent of figure photography today", who "paints her subjects in gleaming highlights and crisp shadows", and she has been named as one of the three "finest of the photographers of the female form". During this period, she shared studios with Walter Bird at Kinocrat House on the Cromwell Road, London, and the notorious model Pamela Green posed for her. Her nude photographs gave her financial independence, appearing in publications including Men Only, Lilliput, Figure Quarterly and Modern Man. She also published articles to assist hopeful models, sitters and photographers.

Her portraits are held in the collections of the National Portrait Gallery, London, the Bibliothèque nationale de France and the Library of Congress.

== Personal life ==
Joan Craven married twice, firstly in 1933 to John Shorland, and secondly in 1963 to Lieutenant Commander Geoffrey Lewis. She was a member of the Three Arts Club, London. She had homes at Heath Lodge, Redbourn, Hertfordshire and Jesmond Dene, Tamerton Foliot, near Plymouth, where she died on 2 July 1979.
