= That Kind of Girl =

1963 British film by Gerry O'Hara

- DVD cover for BFI release
- Directed by: Gerry O'Hara
- Written by: Ian Reed
- Based on: story by Jan Read
- Produced by: Robert Hartford-Davis
- Starring: Margaret Rose Keil; David Weston; Linda Marlowe
- Cinematography: Peter Newbrook
- Edited by: Derek York
- Music by: Malcolm Mitchell
- Production company: Compton-Cameo Films
- Distributed by: Tekli Films
- Release date: 1963
- Running time: 76 minutes
- Country: United Kingdom
- Language: English
- Budget: £23,000

That Kind of Girl (U.S. title: Teenage Tramp) is a 1963 British film starring Margaret Rose Keil, David Weston and Linda Marlowe. Written by Ian Reed based on a story by Jan Read, it was the directorial debut of Gerry O'Hara, and produced by Robert Hartford-Davis. Michael Klinger and Tony Tenser were executive producers.

== Plot ==
Eva Koenig is a promiscuous 18-year-old Austrian girl working as an au pair with a London family. She becomes sexually involved with several different men in turn – Elliot, a creepy and manipulative older man; Max, an idealistic ban-the-bomb peace campaigner; and Keith, a student in a relationship with his childhood sweetheart. When Eva contracts syphilis and passes it on, there are major implications for all involved.

== Cast ==
- Margaret Rose Keil as Eva Koenig
- David Weston as Keith Murray
- Linda Marlowe as Janet Bates
- Peter Burton as Elliot Collier
- Frank Jarvis as Max
- Sylvia Kay as Mrs. Millar
- David Davenport as Mr. Millar

== Production ==
Gerry O'Hara was an assistant director when offered the film. In a 2010 interview he said "I think the guy who offered it to me, Robert Hartford-Davis, thought he was going to direct me! It was an exploitation picture, pure and simple, about venereal disease. ... It was a three-week shoot, 17 days. The night that we finished, I went back to my flat and I was absolutely exhausted. We had no money, so we just had a few beers in a pub, and that was the end of the picture party. They didn’t even want me to edit it, or do any of the finishing stages. I think I got £750 for a three-week shoot."

== Release ==
=== Critical response ===
Monthly Film Bulletin said: "The story is sheer melodrama, running the weird gamut of anti-nuclear demonstration, striptease, pre-marital intercourse, rape and improper use of the telephone – scarcely a digestible mixture."

Sight and Sound wrote (2010): "On the one hand, the film portrays a society in which the old certainties about class, sexuality and politics are being questioned. In its more louche moments, it is even reminiscent of Val Guest's later 1970s softcore romp Au Pair Girls in its portrayal of Eva, the uninhibited and promiscuous foreigner who so excites the buttoned-up Brits. ... Despite its inadvertently comic moments and moralising tone, the film is well enough crafted and acted to seem like more than just a piece of heavyhanded public-health propaganda."

In Transformation and Tradition in 1960s British Cinema (2019) Laura Mayne writes: "Significantly, [the film] also featured the German Margaret Rose Keil, whose deviant actions were therefore easier to pass the censor because she was considered 'exotic'. ... In That Kind of Girl the desire to inform as well as educate is a key feature of the film's highly moralistic 'it could happen to you' narrative."

=== Home media ===
That Kind of Girl was released on DVD and Blu-ray in the UK on the BFI's Flipside imprint on 25 January 2009. The disc also includes a selection of short films and an interview with Robert Hartford-Davis (1968, 14 mins) in which he discusses his film career and production methods.
