= A Study in Terror =

1965 British film by James Hill

- U.S. theatrical release poster
- Directed by: James Hill
- Written by: Derek Ford; Donald Ford; Henry Craig (uncredited)
- Based on: an original story by Derek & Donald Ford based on characters created by Sir Arthur Conan Doyle
- Produced by: Henry E. Lester executive Herman Cohen; Michael Klinger; Tony Tenser
- Starring: John Neville; Donald Houston; John Fraser; Anthony Quayle; Robert Morley; Barbara Windsor; Adrienne Corri; Judi Dench
- Cinematography: Desmond Dickinson
- Edited by: Henry Richardson
- Music by: John Scott
- Production companies: Compton-Tekli Film Productions; Sir Nigel Films Productions
- Distributed by: Columbia Pictures
- Release dates: October 1965 (UK); 10 August 1966 (USA)
- Running time: 95 minutes
- Country: United Kingdom
- Language: English
- Budget: £160,000

A Study in Terror is a 1965 British thriller film directed by James Hill and starring John Neville as Sherlock Holmes and Donald Houston as Dr. Watson. It was filmed at Shepperton Studios, London, with some location work at Osterley House in Middlesex.

Although based on Arthur Conan Doyle's characters, the story is an original one, which has the famous detective on the trail of Jack the Ripper. The story of A Study in Terror challenges Sherlock Holmes to solve these horrific crimes. This leads Holmes through a trail of aristocracy, blackmail and family insanity. Unlike Scotland Yard, and the real-life story, Holmes eventually discovers the true identity of the Ripper.

The film had its world premiere at the Leicester Square Theatre in the West End of London on 4 November 1965. A Study in Terror presents the first film appearance of Mycroft Holmes.

== Plot ==
In the dark alleys of London, the notorious Jack the Ripper is committing a series of gruesome murders. Holmes and Watson, already intrigued by reports of the Jack the Ripper murders, become involved when they receive a parcel from Whitechapel containing a case of surgical instruments with the scalpel, possibly the murder weapon, missing. By a family crest on the box, they come into contact with the Duke of Shires who admits his elder son Michael Osborne dreamed of becoming a doctor. His younger son, Edward, Lord Carfax, tells them Michael has disappeared. Holmes deduces the instruments were pawned to a broker, Joseph Beck, who tells them that he received them from an Angela Osborne, who gave her address as a soup kitchen run by Doctor Murray.

Holmes and Watson meet Murray, also a police pathologist, after convincing Lestrade to let them view the body of the most recent victim, Annie Chapman. Holmes convinces Watson to go to the soup kitchen and make a fuss of looking for Angela. A disguised Holmes then follows Murray's niece Sally when she goes to meet Carfax. They explain Carfax was blackmailed by a man who threatened to tell his father that Michael, who was helping Murray at the soup kitchen, had married a prostitute. Carfax now works there himself, also providing funds, but Michael was gone before he and Sally arrived. The blackmailer, Max Steiner, now runs a local public house.

The Prime Minister asks Mycroft Holmes to persuade his brother to investigate the Ripper case, unaware that he is already involved. Holmes and Watson nearly catch the Ripper when he kills another prostitute who invites him into her room. Holmes confronts Murray who explains that Michael had learned that Angela had assisted Steiner with the blackmail. She and Steiner tried to force Michael to add pressure to his brother to get more money, but he refused and Steiner brutally beat him. During the altercation Angela was disfigured when acid she tried to throw at Michael was accidentally thrown in her face. Murray also reveals his crippled and mentally disabled assistant is Michael, seriously injured as the result of the beating from Steiner, and perhaps the knowledge of what his wife had done. Holmes and Watson discover Angela in the upper room of Steiner's inn (in reality her property) and she admits that she sent them the surgical instruments, having removed the scalpel herself, to get them involved. Holmes and Watson return Michael to his family, and Edward asks his father to allow Michael to stay, but he refuses until Holmes reveals his condition and how much he has suffered. The Duke softens and tells Edward to take Michael to his old room and make him comfortable and he will come to see him in a few minutes. He asks Holmes how he found Michael, and he tells him that he received information from Dr Murray and the woman who owns the Angel and Crown pub.

During the night, Holmes discovers Carfax attempting to kill Angela in her room; he is the Ripper. The pub catches alight during a struggle; Carfax, Steiner and Angela are all killed in the blaze but Holmes escapes. He explains to Watson that Carfax had no way of identifying Angela, who had besmirched the family name, so he killed every prostitute that he came across in the insane hope that one of them would be her. With all those involved dead, Holmes elects to keep the truth from the police.

== Cast ==
- John Neville as Sherlock Holmes
- Donald Houston as Dr. Watson
- John Fraser as Edward Osborne, Lord Carfax
- Anthony Quayle as Doctor Murray
- Barbara Windsor as Annie Chapman
- Adrienne Corri as Angela Osborne
- Frank Finlay as Inspector Lestrade
- Judi Dench as Sally Young
- Charles Régnier as Joseph Beck (as Charles Regnier)
- Cecil Parker as Prime Minister
- Barry Jones as the Duke of Shires
- Robert Morley as Mycroft Holmes
- Dudley Foster as Home Secretary
- Georgia Brown as the Singer
- Peter Carsten as Max Steiner
- Christiane Maybach as Polly Nichols
- Kay Walsh as Cathy Eddowes
- John Cairney as Michael Osborne
- Edina Ronay as Mary Jane Kelly
- Avis Bunnage as Landlady
- Barbara Leake as Mrs. Hudson
- Patrick Newell as PC Benson
- Norma Foster as Elizabeth Stride
- Terry Downes as Chunky
- Jeremy Lloyd as Rupert
- Corin Redgrave as Rupert's Friend

== Sir Nigel Films ==
The movie was from Sir Nigel Films, a company set up by the estate of Sir Arthur Conan Doyle, with the aim of exploiting Doyle's literary works in film and television. Henry Lester, managing director of Sir Nigel said "We felt that the royalties we were receiving from various media outlets bore little relation to profits. Also we were not pleased with the quality of some of the films." Doyle's son Arthur was chairman of the board on the company.

In 1963 the Mirisch Company obtained the rights to make The Life of Sherlock Holmes. However, when that project was delayed, the Mirischs gave permission for Sir Nigel to make A Study in Terror and one more film.

A Study in Terror was a co production between Sir Nigel Films and Britain's Compton Group, and American producer Herman Cohen. Sir Nigel were entitled to fifty percent of the profits.

In 1966 Sir Nigel had plans for five movies and a television series.

== Production ==
=== Development ===
According to producer Herman Cohen, he had been thinking of making a movie about Sherlock Holmes, and so had the producing team of Michael Klinger and Tony Tenser. They decided to team up and Cohen arranged for finance through Columbia.

Cohen says the idea of combining Sherlock Holmes and Jack the Ripper came from Donald and Derek Ford, who wrote the first draft. Cohen was not happy with it and arranged for a rewrite from Harry Craig.

=== Shooting ===
The film was shot at Shepperton Studios. Cohen says he had to direct the fire sequence because director James Hill went missing. "Hill had a habit of disappearing," said the producer. "He was a nice guy, but strange. Nobody could get close to him. And he was always fidgety and very nervous."

== Release ==
Producer Herman Cohen originally wanted to title the film Fog but Columbia insisted on the title A Study in Terror to tie in with the Sherlock Holmes novel A Study in Scarlet.

Cohen also recalled on its US release Columbia advertised the film as a then-popular tongue in cheek Batman-type film rather than a horror or detective film.

=== Box office ===
Cohen said the film was a bigger hit in Europe than the US, which he attributed in part to the fact that he, not Columbia, handled the ad campaign.

== Reception ==
=== Critical ===
The Monthly Film Bulletin gave a lackluster review saying "the film marks time lamely in the intervals between its conventionally shock-cut murders, while John Neville and Donald Houston uncomfortably mouth their lines as if suspecting that nobody will listen." Variety felt that "though the mixture of fiction and fact doesn't entirely click...An excellent cast gives the production fill value." The New York Times said "the entire cast, director and writers do play their roles well enough to make wholesale slaughter a pleasant diversion." Allmovie gave the film a very positive review, praising it as a "well-made and exciting mystery...satisfying and well-acted."

== Post-release history ==
In 1966, the film was made into a novel by Ellery Queen and Paul W. Fairman. The novelisation is unusual in that it adds a framing story wherein Ellery Queen reads a manuscript that re-tells the actions of the film. The framing story was written by Ellery Queen and the novelisation of the film itself by Fairman.

The Holmes-Ripper idea was later taken up in Murder by Decree (1978), in which Frank Finlay reprised his role as Lestrade and Anthony Quayle once again had an important part (though this time as Sir Charles Warren of Scotland Yard).

== See also ==
- Dust and Shadow: An Account of the Ripper Killings by Dr. John H. Watson
- The Last Sherlock Holmes Story
- Murder by Decree

== Notes ==
- Weaver, Tom (April 1992). "Cohen Climax". Fangoria. pp. 14–19, 57.
