= Captain Miracle =

- Captain Miracle (left) and Miracle Junior (right) on the cover of Captain Miracle #1.

Publication information
- Publisher: Anglo Features
- First appearance: Captain Miracle #1 (1960)
- Created by: Mick Anglo

In-story information
- Alter ego: Johnny Dee
- Species: Human
- Partnerships: Miracle Junior; Lola Karbel
- Abilities: Flight; Super-strength; Invulnerability; Enhanced senses

Captain Miracle is a fictional British Silver Age comic book superhero. The character was originally created by Mick Anglo for his own Anglo Features imprint, using material planned for Marvelman - itself a reworking of Fawcett Publications' Captain Marvel. The character first appeared in Captain Miracle #1, published in October 1960.

== Publication history ==
The character was devised to make use of extant material after publishers L. Miller & Son decided to switch their Marvelman and Young Marvelman comics to reprint status in 1960. As a result Anglo set up his own Anglo Features label to make further use of completed material produced by Gower Studios. The name Captain Miracle had previously been considered for Marvelman during that character's creation in 1954. The character was redesigned with short sleeves, gloves and bare legs, and the "MM" logo was replaced by a simple arrow. The 28-page monthly comic also included other strips either from Gower Studios' inventory or imported from American publishers, such as Western-themed strips based on Belle Starr and Daniel Boone.

Neither Anglo Features nor Captain Miracle were a success, and the title ended after 9 monthly issues in June 1961 when Anglo folded the imprint and instead returned Gower Studios to work for hire with Thorpe & Porter. Anglo would revisit the template again while devising Super Hombre for Spanish publisher Editorial Ferma, which was subsequently imported and published by Thorpe & Porter as Miracle Man.

In 1989, the character made a guest appearance in Grant Morrison's 2000AD strip Zenith as one of a large number of multiversal superheroes battling the Lloigor. Described by one character as one of "the most powerful crime-fighters on any alternative", Captain Miracle is accidentally left behind on a doomed parallel Earth along with fellow powerhouse Ace Hart. Both are possessed by the Lloigor but are eventually destroyed by their erstwhile allies during an attempt to destroy Zenith's Earth, with Captain Miracle being overwhelmed after punching Tanya of The Amazing Three in the face hard enough to decapitate her.

== Fictional character biography ==
Due to the character's origins as a redrawn, relettered version of Marvelman much of the premise and content is very similar to both that title and thus Captain Marvel. Reporter Jhonny Dee became Daily Clarion editorial assistant, and transformed into the superhero when he called "El Karim!" (in place of "Kimota!"). Due to some of the material originally featuring Young Marvelman, Captain Miracle also had Miracle Junior, who also featured in solo strips in the comic. Miracle Junior's civilian identity was messenger boy Tod Allen. Another ally was Lola Karbel, an officer of the Amalgamated Interplanetary Police, who featured in stories set in 2065.

== Powers and abilities ==
Captain Miracle retained the powers of his predecessors, having super-strength, invulnerability and flight capability. He could also travel backwards or forwards in time by rapidly orbiting Earth. Whereas Marvelman's powers were loosely given to him by science, Captain Miracle's were attributed to "Eastern magic".
