= Historic Masters =

British record label

Historic Masters was a historical reissue record label, based in Takeley, Essex, England, dedicated to making available quality pressings on vinyl of rare 78 rpm recordings of opera singers. Historic Masters Ltd claimed to be, to its knowledge, "the only company in the world issuing 78 rpm discs of historic vocal and operatic material on a regular basis". Historic Masters Ltd appears to have ceased operation in 2011 after the death of Roger Beardsley who was director. The Historic Masters website was not maintained after this and of 2020 is a holding page.

== Origins and production history ==
Originally an offshoot of the British Institute of Recorded Sound (now the British Library Sound Archive), Historic Masters was the brainchild of the actor, record collector and connoisseur of singers, Richard Bebb. The initial Historic Masters release was planned as a subscriber-only series of twenty reissues, pressed on high quality vinyl using original metal parts from the His Master's Voice archive. The British Institute of Recorded Sound directed the project under the supervision of Bebb with an advisory committee chaired by George Lascelles (Lord Harewood) and including the influential figure of Desmond Shawe-Taylor. After various organisational delays, this first release was eventually despatched to subscribers in 1973. Despite making a profit, the British Institute of Recorded Sound lost interest in the project. To fill the gap, Historic Masters Ltd, was set up as an independent company. It was able to release its first reissue in 1983: a set of five records produced in a similar manner as before and again distributed on a subscriber-only basis, thereby avoiding excess production. Many more releases followed along similar lines, including some records which had never previously been released in any format. As of 2011, Historic Masters had released over two hundred discs by historic singers, including larger collections of recordings by Fernando De Lucia, Nellie Melba, Adelina Patti and Francesco Tamagno.
