= Gold (1974 film) =

1974 film by Peter R. Hunt

- Theatrical release poster by Tom Jung
- Directed by: Peter R. Hunt
- Written by: Stanley Price; Wilbur Smith
- Based on: Gold Mine (1970 novel) by Wilbur Smith
- Produced by: Michael Klinger
- Starring: Roger Moore; Susannah York; Ray Milland; Bradford Dillman; John Gielgud
- Cinematography: Ousama Rawi
- Edited by: John Glen
- Music by: Elmer Bernstein
- Distributed by: Hemdale Film Corporation (UK)
- Release date: 6 September 1974 (UK)
- Running time: 124 minutes
- Country: United Kingdom
- Language: English
- Budget: £1,000,000 or $2 million
- Box office: £454,538 (UK by 1975)

Gold is a 1974 British adventure thriller film directed by Peter R. Hunt and starring Roger Moore, Susannah York, Ray Milland, Bradford Dillman and John Gielgud. Based on the 1970 novel Gold Mine by Wilbur Smith (who also co-wrote the screenplay), the film follows Rodney "Rod" Slater (Moore), general manager of a South African gold mine, who is instructed by his boss Steyner (Dillman) to break through an underground dike into what he is told is a rich seam of gold. Meanwhile, he falls in love with Steyner's wife Terry (York).

The film is notable for featuring several cast and crew from the James Bond film series, including star Moore, director Hunt, editor John Glen, and titles designer Maurice Binder. Filming took place on-location in Johannesburg and London.

Gold was released in the United Kingdom by Hemdale Film Corporation on September 6, 1974. It received mixed-to-positive reviews, and was a big commercial success, becoming one of the highest-grossing British films of 1974. The film was a nominated for an Academy Award for Best Original Song (for "Wherever Love Takes Me", performed in the film by Maureen McGovern) and a BAFTA Award for Best Sound.

== Plot ==
Johannesburg, 1973. A tunnel collapse at the Sonderditch gold mine is no accident. It was actually a failed plan by an international syndicate to manipulate gold prices. They now arrange for a hole to be drilled into Sonderditch's underground wall next to a huge water reserve. Presumably, when the wall is breached, a flood will result, destroying the mine and boosting gold's market value. The syndicate's membership includes the mine-owner Hurry Hirschfeld's grandson-in-law, Manfred Steyner, so this should all be a done deal. But Steyner's chief accomplice, his general manager Frank Lemmer, died in the tunnel collapse. So he now interviews Rodney "Rod" Slater, the underground manager, for the vacant post.

Afterwards, Slater meets Steyner's wife Terry and is attracted but she shows no interest. However, Steyner arranges for them to meet again, hoping Terry will influence her grandfather Hurry, Sonderditch's owner, to endorse Slater. The plan works: Slater becomes general manager and he and Terry begin an affair.

Slater, unaware of the syndicate or its plans, carries out Steyner's orders to drill near the reservoir. But to provide insurance against catastrophe, he plants a safety charge to block the tunnel in case of a water breakage. Steyner soon discovers Slater is seeing Terry but allows the affair to continue: it will keep Slater away from the mine so that the safety charge can be disabled without his knowledge.

Over a warm Christmas, Slater and Terry pilot her small plane to a vacation spot. While they are away, drilling back at the mine continues. When the final breach is made, a wall of water roars into the mazes of tunnels and shafts. The mine then floods, trapping a thousand workers. Slater hears of the disaster on the radio and demands Terry fly him back to the mine. Once there, Slater and Big King, a trusted indigenous worker, descend into the mine, braving flood waters, to reconnect the safety charge that will seal the dike and save the trapped miners. They succeed, but only because Big King sacrifices his own life to detonate the charge, allowing Slater to fall injured into a rubber dinghy and float to safety.

As Slater is carried from the mine to an ambulance, Hirschfeld tells him, "You're a maniac!"—but with a satisfied smile. Terry adds, "I love you." Meanwhile, after Steyner's plot to destroy Sonderditch has failed, he is targeted for assassination by the syndicate. He perishes after being run over by co-conspirator Stephen Marais commandeering Steyner's own car; Marais also loses his life when Steyner's car explodes after Steyner threw a stone at Marais, smashing his car's windshield. Steyner's death leaves Terry free to continue her relationship with Slater.

== Cast ==
- Roger Moore as Rodney "Rod" Slater
- Susannah York as Terry Steyner
- Ray Milland as Hurry Hirschfeld
- Bradford Dillman as Manfred Steyner
- John Gielgud as Mr. Farrell
- Tony Beckley as Stephen Marais
- Simon Sabela as 'Big King'
- Bernard Horsfall as Dave Kowalski
- Marc Smith as Tex Kiernan
- John Hussey as Ian Plummer
- Bill Brewer as Aristide
- Norman Coombes as Frank Lemmer
- George Jackson as Gus
- Ken Hare as Jackson
- Paddy Norval as Danielle
- Carl Duering as Schrader
- Paul Hansard as Bergen
- André Maranne as Piquet
- Nadim Sawalha as Jaffar
- Patsy Kensit as Girl at Party

== Original novel ==
Gold Mine
- Paperback edition
- Author: Wilbur Smith
- Language: English
- Publisher: Heinemann
- Publication date: 1970
- Publication place: South Africa

The movie is based on a 1970 novel by South African author Wilbur Smith. The story was based on a real-life flooding of a gold mine near Johannesburg in 1968. Smith researched the book by working in a gold mine for a few weeks. "I was a sort of privileged member of the team, I could ask questions and not be told to shut up,” he says.

The New York Times said "Mr. Smith, an adventure writer disdainful of subtleties, blasts his way to a finale strewn with broken bodies and orange blossoms."

== Production ==
=== Development ===
Producer Michael Klinger bought the rights to it and Shout at the Devil as his follow up to Get Carter. "Actually they're both just as tough as Carter,” said Klinger of the projects. The South African government promised to co operate in filming at the mines.

The film Klinger most wanted to make was Shout at the Devil. However, because it was a period film it needed a large budget. Gold was cheaper because it told a contemporary story and he ended up filming that instead.

Klinger tried to set up the film with MGM, for whom he had made Get Carter. The studio bought out Klinger's option for Gold Mine for £25,000, but insisted that Klinger hire an experienced writer, Stanley Price, to work on the script along with Wilbur Smith. MGM later withdrew from the project – they were pulling out of all production in Britain – and Klinger bought back rights to the novel and script. The budget of over £1 million was raised mostly from South African businessmen. (One account said it was three South African furniture manufacturers.)

Roger Moore was cast in the lead. It was his first film since making his debut as James Bond in Live and Let Die (1973). He was paid $200,000 plus a percentage of the profits. Producer Michael Klinger used a number of other people associated with James Bond films, including editor John Glen, production designer Syd Cain, titles designer Maurice Binder and director Peter Hunt.

Tony Klinger, assistant to the producer, said he tried to get Steven Spielberg to direct the movie after having been impressed by Duel. However, Roger Moore vetoed the choice on the basis of Spielberg's youth. "Roger was, I think, a little insecure about his acting ability, and as a consequence was always protective of his image, like most movie stars that are less actor and more star. I guess that's why we got the message loud and clear that he turned down our first choice for the director for Gold", he said.

It was reported that the South African government was opposed to the film but Klinger said it was actually the mining industry. However the General Mining Corporation eventually gave its support.

=== Filming ===
The film was controversially filmed in South Africa under the apartheid regime, with scenes shot at two large mines, Buffelfontein and West Rand. "We had to drop down two miles, which was horrendous,” said Moore. "It was great to start with, and I got tremendously enthusiastic about the mine, but after ten days down there it got very claustrophobic." Studios interiors were filmed at Killarney Film Studios in Johannesburg and Pinewood Studios in London.

The British film union, ACTT, put a black ban on the movie because its members were forbidden to work in South Africa. The Union suggested the film be shot in a mine in Wales instead but the filmmakers refused, claiming Wales looked nothing like South Africa. Some members defied the ban.

Bradford Dillman later recalled "Susannah York, a militant liberal, used every publicity opportunity to deplore the conditions of the Black miners, despite pleas from the producers to cool it."

The complexity of filming the final flood scenes resulted in the movie going over budget.

=== Distribution ===
Klinger tried to sell the film to companies such as British Lion, Anglo-EMI, and Rank, but was rejected. He succeeded in selling the film to Hemdale.

== Release ==
The film had its world premiere on 5 September 1974 at the Odeon Leicester Square in London before opening to the public the following day. It expanded on 8 September 1974 to the rest of the United Kingdom and further expanded on 12 September.

In the United States, the film was released only as part of a double bill with The Taking of Pelham One Two Three.

== Reception ==
=== Box office ===
The film was popular at the box office – it was one of the 19 most popular films at the British box office in 1974 – enabling Klinger to raise finance for Shout at the Devil.

=== Critical response ===
The Los Angeles Times said the film "is everything people have in mind when they talk about a movie movie. Its hero is heroic, its heroine is beautiful and kittenishly sexy, its villains are outrageously villainous, its characters crustily colorful. It has scope, scale, surprise. It has more punch than a 15 round fight and more corn than Kansas. It is a travelogue of South Africa and a fascinating audiovisual essay on gold mining."

=== Awards and nominations ===
Award	Category	Nominee(s)	Result	Ref.
Academy Awards	Best Song	"Wherever Love Takes Me"; Elmer Bernstein (music); Don Black (lyrics)	Nominated	
British Academy Film Awards	Best Soundtrack	Alan Somes, Rydal Love, Michael Crouch, John W. Mitchell, Gordon McCallum	Nominated	
