= Take Off Your Clothes and Live! =

1963 British naturist film by Arnold Louis Miller

- Theatrical release poster
- Directed by: Arnold Louis Miller
- Written by: Arnold Louis Miller
- Produced by: Stanley Long; Arnold Louis Miller
- Cinematography: Stanley Long
- Music by: Tony King
- Production company: Searchlight-Miracle
- Distributed by: Miracle
- Release date: 1963
- Running time: 64 mins
- Country: United Kingdom
- Language: English
- Budget: £14,000

Take Off Your Clothes and Live! is a 1963 British naturist film directed and written by Arnold Louis Miller. It was partly shot in the south of France.

== Plot ==
Nine girls travel to Cannes, for a nudist holiday with hosts John and Tony. As well as the usual beach activities they visit a millionaire's yacht, go on a treasure hunt, have a Twist competition, and visit the Isle of Levant.

== Cast ==
- Ian Michael as Tony
- Gino Nennan as John
- Jenny Lane as Lee
- Maureen Haydon as June
- Susan Irwin-Clark as Carol
- Terry Lee as Ingrid
- Margaret Collins as Mandy
- Angela Lowe as Pat
- Hedy Borland as Heidi
- Paula Ku-Chich as Esme
- Ulla Thoren as Barbara
- Anna Silvers as Marie

== Release ==
The film was given an 'A' certificate by the British Board of Film Classification. Kine Weekly reported that the UK release of the film was supported in Bradford, Dewsbury, Westcliff and Luton with personal appearances by five of the girls in the cast.

== Critical reception ==
The Monthly Film Bulletin said: "Usual traveloguery, usual coy commentary, usual tolerably pretty girls, usual yawning boredom."

In Doing Rude Things David McGillivray wrote: "The style of presentation was so gauche that today it looks like self-parody."

In The World's Worst Movies, Tim Healey described the film as "a mysteriously unerotic experience."
