= Douglas Webb =

- Born: Douglas Edward Webb; 12 September 1922; Kingston upon Thames, Surrey, England
- Died: 12 August 1996 (aged 73); Isle of Wight, England
- Partner: Pamela Green (196?–1996)

Douglas Webb DFM, (12 September 1922 – 8 December 1996) was a British photographer who worked in the film and television industries. He was also a veteran of the Dam Busters raid.

== Early life ==
Webb was born in Leytonstone, London. Before the war he worked for Ilford and then as a printer with the London News Agency in Fleet Street.

== World War II ==
During World War II he served with the Royal Air Force as an air gunner with No. 49 Squadron and No. 617 Squadron. Douglas was front gunner with the crew of the Avro Lancaster AJ'O' for Orange, piloted by William Townsend, which took part in the Dam Busters Raid.

Webb was awarded the Distinguished Flying Medal for his part in the operation. Five of the crew were also given medals, making them the second most decorated Dams Raid crew after Guy Gibson's. Douglas also flew on 617 Squadron's last wartime operation, an attack on Hitler's mountain lair. He was one of only two men to fly on the squadron's first and last wartime operations.

Webb sold his Distinguished Flying Medal, along with his logbook on 14 March 1989 at Christie's in London to fund publishing a nude photography book of Pamela Green.

On the 75th anniversary of the Dam Busters Raid Douglas Webb was honoured with a blue plaque at 158 Richmond Road, London E11, the house where he was living when he enlisted in the RAF at the age of 18. The plaque was unveiled on Thursday 17 May 2018.

== Career ==
After the war he rejoined the London News Agency as a staff photographer, until he was offered a contract with the Rank Organisation's Denham Studios as a stills photographer. Webb later moved to Gainsborough Pictures where he worked on his first film Miranda. Webb went on to establish a successful business as a freelance photographer with his own studio in Greek Street, Soho, doing theatrical and film portraits. He first used Pamela Green, his future partner, as a nude model in 1948. She was only seventeen. He later moved to larger premises in Albany Street near Regent's Park. During his career, Webb was involved in the production of photographic stills and projection transparencies for numerous films such as The Killing of Sister George (1968), Perfect Friday (1970) and Krull (1983). His television credits included Special Branch, Van der Valk and The Sweeney. He was the stills photographer on the film Naked as Nature Intended in which Pamela Green starred, and in 2013 his photographs were used to illustrate the book Naked as Nature Intended, The Epic Tale of a Nudist Picture.

As the British film industry went into decline he moved to the Isle of Wight in 1986, where he began to catalogue the photographs of Pamela Green taken in the 1960s and '70s. The bulk of their outdoor studies were taken in Cornwall, Melton Constable in Norfolk and the Isle of Wight. In 1993 Douglas and Green moved to Yarmouth.

== Published works ==
Naked as Nature Intended: The Epic Tale of a Nudist Picture. Suffolk & Watt, 2013, ISBN 9780954598594.

== Selected filmography ==
- Krull, 1983
- Gulliver's Travels, 1977
- The Ghoul, 1975
- Legend of the Werewolf, 1975
- And Now for Something Completely Different, 1971
- The Virgin and the Gypsy, 1970
- The Guru, 1969
- Casino Royale, 1967
- The Spy with a Cold Nose, 1966
- The Woman Who Wouldn't Die, 1965
- The 7th Dawn, 1964
- The King's Breakfast, 1963
- Naked as Nature Intended, 1961
