= My Bare Lady (TV series) =

- Country of origin: United States
- No. of seasons: 2
- No. of episodes: 12

Production
- Running time: 60 minutes

Original release
- Network: Fox Reality Channel
- Release: December 7, 2006 – December 20, 2008

My Bare Lady is a 2006 United Kingdom-based reality TV show that aired on the Fox Reality Channel. The series followed four American female pornographic stars as they took acting lessons and performed in scenes from classic drama alongside British actors in London's West End. The show was hosted by British actor/director Christopher Biggins and the women were trained by Biggins and various other British theatre professionals, including Louie Spence of Pineapple Dance Studios fame.

The show is named after a 1963 film whose title is a pun recalling the Pygmalion-inspired musical My Fair Lady by Alan Jay Lerner and Frederick Loewe, popularized in a film adaptation starring Audrey Hepburn.

== Cast ==
=== Season 1 ===
- Chanel St. James
- Kirsten Price (winner)
- Nautica Thorn
- Sasha Knox

==== Auditioned (1st episode) ====
- Caren Caan
- Gia Darling
- Julia Bond
- Mary Carey
- Sunset Thomas
- Taylor Wane
- Sunny Lane
- Sarah Blake
- Angelique Morgan

Season	Ep #	Title	Description
1	1	Cattle Call	Four women are selected to participate in the competition.
1	2	Floodlights and Catfights	Close living arrangements and acting, vocal and dance classes stress the women.
1	3	Falling in Lust	Relationships start to fall apart due to the competition.
1	4	Another Opening	The casting decision of Juliet is announced.

=== Season 2 ===
Based on the success of the debut season a second series was launched called "My Bare Lady 2: Open for Business." The series debuted on Fox Reality Channel on Saturday, November 8, 2008 and was divided into eight half-hour episodes.
The show placed four adult entertainment stars in the same house for a month in Los Angeles and adopted a reality format similar to the first season to provide an in depth look at the daily goings on. The cast competed in a series of tasks and challenges under the tutelage of top business coach Mike Mataraza in preparation for leading an existing business for one week.

- Brooke Haven
- Sunny Leone
- Casey Parker

Season	Ep #	Title	Description
2	1	From the Bedroom to the Boardroom	The women of the new season and Coach Mike Mataraza are introduced.
2	2	Wax On Wax Off	The women are split into teams to compete at a car wash.
2	3	Makeover Time	The women pitch a product in a boardroom after a business makeover.
2	4	48 Hours to Save a Baby	A charity event is held to raise funds for abandoned babies.
2	5	Shirts off Their Backs	The women design and sell t-shirts at a flea market.
2	6	Team Building	Competitions are held via team building exercises.
2	7	Doing the Business	A cocktail party is planned.
2	8	Cocktails Anyone?	Results are announced.
