= Pamela Green =

British glamour model and actress (1929–2010)

- Born: Phyllis Pamela Green; 28 March 1929; Kingston upon Thames, Surrey, England
- Died: 7 May 2010 (aged 81); Isle of Wight, England
- Other names: Rita Landre; Princess Sonmar Harricks
- Occupations: Glamour model; actress
- Spouse: Edward Guy Hillier (m. 1951; div. 1965)
- Partners: George Harrison Marks (1953–1961); Douglas Webb (196?–1996)
- Website: pamela-green.com

Phyllis Pamela Green (28 March 1929 – 7 May 2010) was an English glamour model and actress, best known at the end of the 1950s and early 1960s. She modeled for Zoltán Glass and his brother Stephen, Bill Brandt, Joan Craven, Bertram Park, George Pickow and John Everard.

== Early life ==
Pamela Green was born in Kingston upon Thames, Surrey, England on 28 March 1929. She grew up in West Wickham, after which she attended Saint Martin's School of Art in central London; she started figure modelling to pay for her art school studies and moved on to photographic modelling because it paid more. She also worked as a dancer and appeared in the Latin Quarter at The London Casino (aka Prince Edward Theatre) and Bernard Delfont's Folies Bergère at the Hippodrome, London. Early in her career, while still at art college, Pamela Green was photographed by Bill Brandt, Zoltán Glass and Angus McBean.

In 1954 Green started to supply the bookshops and newsagents of London's Soho with her own postcard sets of glamour photographs, to supplement her work as a photographer's model. In 1955 Luxor Press published a pictorial monograph on Green featuring the photographs of George Harrison Marks, entitled Pamela.

== Career ==
Her rising profile prompted her to set up Kamera Publications Ltd with Harrison Marks. With Green as Managing Director, they produced several magazines, with Kamera being the most successful. It was the first glamour magazine of any note in the UK, and heralded the top-shelf magazine industry in the country. As their success grew they ventured into 8mm cine film production, which was the format commonly used for home viewing.

Her first film appearance was in Michael Powell's psychological thriller Peeping Tom (1960), as a model who falls victim to the serial killer protagonist. Green then appeared in the nudist film Naked as Nature Intended (1961), released in the United States as As Nature Intended, written and directed by Marks.

In 1961, Green's personal relationship with Marks ended, but they continued their business relationship. By the mid-1960s Harrison Marks was increasingly preoccupied by film making. Kamera ceased publication in 1968. He always acknowledged his debt to Pamela Green and said in his biography The Naked Truth, "Pam set me up. She started it all." In 1964 she appeared in an episode of This Week.

Green continued to model for her then-partner, the photographer Douglas Webb. She became Webb's camera stills assistant and worked for the major film companies in London. In 1992 she wrote the foreword to David McGillivray's book Doing Rude Things, which was reprinted in 2017. A television version of Doing Rude Things was produced by the BBC in 1995, in which she was interviewed.

== Personal life ==
In September 1951, Green married stagehand Guy Hillier. They separated after one month, divorcing in 1965. From 1953 to 1961 she lived with George Harrison Marks and took his name. Her third partner was the photographer Douglas Webb, with whom Green lived until his death in December 1996. They lived in a Victorian villa on the Isle of Wight. In 1993, they moved to a terraced house in Yarmouth, where Green was a member of the Yarmouth Women's Institute.

Pamela Green died from leukaemia, aged 81, on the Isle of Wight on 7 May 2010.

== Filmography ==
Year	Title	Role	Notes
1960	Peeping Tom	Milly	
1961	Naked as Nature Intended	Pamela	
1961	The Day the Earth Caught Fire	Shower steward	Uncredited
1961	Badland Big'eads		Short
1963	The Chimney Sweeps	Maid	
1967	The Naked World of Harrison Marks	Herself	
1968	Otto und die nackte Welle	Model	
1975	Legend of the Werewolf	Anne-Marie	

== Kamera Cine striptease films ==
- Art for Art’s Sake (1960) with Jean Sporle (also spelled Spaul)
- Witches Brew (1960) as Rita Landre
- Cover Girl (1960) (uncredited cameo)
- Xcitement (1961)
- Gypsy Fire (1961) as Sonmar Harriks
- The Window Dresser (1961)

== Published works ==
- Naked as Nature Intended, The Epic Tale of a Nudist Picture. Suffolk & Watt, 2013, ISBN 9780954598594.
- Pamela. Luxor Press,1956.
