= The Yellow Teddy Bears =

1963 British film by Robert Hartford-Davis

The Yellow Teddybears
- UK theatrical release quad poster
- Directed by: Robert Hartford-Davis
- Screenplay by: Donald Ford and Derek Ford
- Produced by: Michael Klinger, Tony Tenser
- Starring: Jacqueline Ellis; Iain Gregory
- Music by: Malcolm Mitchell
- Production companies: Animated Motion Pictures, Tekli Films
- Distributed by: Compton Films (UK); Topaz (US)
- Release dates: July 1963 (UK); July 1964 (US)
- Running time: 88 minutes
- Country: United Kingdom
- Language: English

The Yellow Teddy Bears (also known as The Yellow Teddybears; US release titles: The Yellow Golliwog, Gutter Girls and The Thrill Seekers) is a 1963 British exploitation drama film directed by Robert Hartford-Davis and starring Jacqueline Ellis, Iain Gregory, Raymond Huntley and Georgina Patterson. It was written by Donald Ford and Derek Ford.

== Plot ==
Linda Donaghue is a pupil at a Peterbridge New Town Grammar School for Girls, where a girl wears a lapel badge – a yellow teddy bear – as a mark that she has slept with a man. Linda finds she is pregnant, by window cleaner and part-time pop singer Kinky Karson. An abortion is arranged, but is halted by Linda's father. Biology teacher Anne Mason realises the significance of the badge, and tells her class about her own experiences. The school governors ask her to explain what is going on. She resigns, and storms out of the meeting claiming that the system does not properly explain the differences between love and lust.

== Cast ==
- Jacqueline Ellis as Anne Mason
- Iain Gregory as Kinky Karson
- Georgina Patterson as Pat Long
- John Bonney as Paul
- Annette Whiteley as Linda Donaghue
- Douglas Sheldon as Mike Griffin
- Victor Brooks as George Donaghue
- Anne Kettle as Sally
- Lesley Dudley as Joan
- Jill Adams as June Wilson
- John Glyn-Jones as Benny Wintle
- Raymond Huntley as Harry Halburton
- Harriette Johns as Lady Gregg
- Noel Dyson as Muriel Donaghue
- Richard Bebb as Frank Lang
- Ann Castle as Eileen Lang
- Micheline Patton as Mrs. Broome
- The Embers as themselves

== Critical reception ==
Monthly Film Bulletin said "Silly, sordid, and splendidly ludicrous cautionary tale, set in a school which appears to teach only biology (diagrams of the human body) and art (copying from nude statuary). All the customary unsavoury ingredients are dragged in, the acting is nothing to speak about, and the direction hits a new low."

Variety said "This probe into juvenile delinquency is clearly inspired by a case reported some time ago of a school where some of the girl pupils wore yellow gollywogs as a sign that they'd surrendered their virginity. The teddybears in his film are the same flaunting symbols. It is a competently made film, with several good performances, and directed tactfully by Robert Hartford-Davis, but the screenplay is too superficial and full of cliches for this not overly original subject to make much impact ... Miss Ellis gives a spirited performance as the biology mistress. Miss Whiteley, as the goodtime girl, and Georgina Patterson, as her innocent friend, are convincing though both lack experience."

In his essay The Yellow Teddybears: Exploitation as Education, Adrian Smith wrote: "The script is generally sympathetic in tone to the viewpoint of the schoolgirls, and condemns the outdated attitudes of parents and authority figures, the latter represented by the school governors. It contains dialogue which contributes to the notion that the filmmakers are genuinely attempting to address a social problem."
