= Naked as Nature Intended =

1961 British naturist film by Harrison Marks

- U.S. theatrical release poster
- Directed by: George Harrison Marks
- Written by: George Harrison Marks
- Produced by: Tony Tenser and Michael Klinger
- Starring: Pamela Green
- Cinematography: Roy Pointer
- Edited by: John Hann-Campbell
- Production company: S.A. Compass Films
- Distributed by: Compton
- Release date: 30 November 1961
- Running time: 60 mins
- Country: United Kingdom
- Language: English

Naked as Nature Intended (U.S. title: As Nature Intended) is a 1961 British nudist film produced and directed by George Harrison Marks and starring Pamela Green. It was the first film from producers Tony Tenser and Michael Klinger.

== Plot ==
Three young women, Pamela, Petrina and Jacky, hire a 1960 Buick Invicta and embark on a motoring holiday of the English countryside. They meet up with two garage attendants Bridget and Angela who decide to take a hiking holiday. They tour Somerset, Devon and Cornwall, visiting Stonehenge, Tintagel, Clovelly, the Minack Open Air Theatre, Bedruthan Steps and Land's End. The women end up at a nudist camp at Land's End and, once there, Angela and Bridget, who are nudists, persuade the others to remove their clothes and lose their inhibitions.

== Cast ==
- Pamela Green as Pamela
- Jackie Salt as Jackie
- Petrina Forsyth as Petrina
- Bridget Leonard as Bridget
- Angela Jones as Angela
- Guy Kingsley Poynter as commentator
- Stuart Samuels as various roles
- George Harrison Marks as open air theatre producer

== Production ==
Tony Tenser and Michael Klinger were distributors of imported films and owners of the Compton Cinema Club in Soho, London's first sex cinema. They wanted to produce a nudist feature film and approached Marks about making one. The only way that the British Board of Film Censors (BBFC) would allow nudity in film at that time was for the film to focus on the naturist movement. Films about nudist camps were considered to be discreet enough to pass the censorship requirements but would still attract audiences. Marks met John Trevelyan, secretary of the BBFC, before shooting commenced. No script had been written at the time of the meeting, but the film was sanctioned by the founder of the British Naturism Movement, who owned the Spielplatz Sun Camp in Hertfordshire where some scenes were to be filmed. Trevelyan raised no objections to the film.

It was known during production as Cornish Holiday.

Once the film had been produced, the shower scene from the opening sequence was cut from the British release by the BBFC, and the film received an A certificate. The cut was made due to the assumption that viewers would infer that Pamela and her flat mate were lesbians.

== Release ==
Tenser's marketing campaign for the film billed it as "the greatest nudist film ever". The campaign made use of the fame that Marks and Green had acquired by this time, billing Green as the "Queen of the Pin-Ups" and Marks as the "King of the Camera".

The film opened in November 1961 at the Cameo Moulin cinema in Great Windmill Street, London to poor reviews; it was, however, popular with audiences, creating queues for entry when it opened. The film ran in cinemas in the West End of London for two years. It was released in the United States as As Nature Intended because the word Naked was considered too risqué for the American public; nevertheless, the cut scene remained in the American release of the film.

The film was released on video in 1999.

In 2013 Pamela Green published the illustrated book Naked as Nature Intended: The Epic Tale of a Nudist Picture (Suffolk & Watt, ISBN 978-0954598594) with photographs by the film's stills photographer "Dam Buster" Douglas Webb.

== Reception ==
The Monthly Film Bulletin wrote: "The attractively photographed tour of Cornwall is by way of being a prelude to the climactic strip-tease. Otherwise the film is a waste of time for all but docile viewers who still feel there's something naughty in eyeing the unclad female form."
