= Ivor Phillips =

Rugby league player

Personal information
- Full name: Ivor Phillips

Playing information

Rugby union
Club
Years	Team	Pld	T	G	FG	P
≤Aug 1961–Aug 61	St Ives RFC

Rugby league
- Position: Centre
Club
Years	Team	Pld	T	G	FG	P
Aug 1961–Apr 63	Warrington	8	2	0	0	6
Apr 1963–≥Apr 63	Swinton
	Total	8	2	0	0	6
- As of 12 December 2016

Ivor Phillips (birth unknown) is a rugby union and professional rugby league footballer who played in the 1960s. He played club level rugby union (RU) for St Ives RFC (Hunts & Peterborough County Rugby Union), or St Ives RFC (Cornwall), and club level rugby league (RL) for Warrington, and Swinton, as a centre.
