= London in the Raw =

1964 British film by Arnold L. Miller and Norman Cohen

- Theatrical release poster
- Directed by: Arnold L. Miller; Norman Cohen
- Written by: Arnold L. Miller
- Produced by: Michael Klinger; Tony Tenser; Stanley Long
- Narrated by: David Gell
- Cinematography: Stanley Long
- Edited by: Stephen Cross
- Production company: Searchlight-Troubadour Productions
- Distributed by: Compton Cameo
- Release date: 1964
- Running time: 76 mins
- Country: United Kingdom
- Language: English
- Budget: £20,000

London in the Raw is a 1964 British documentary about London nightlife directed by Arnold L. Miller and Norman Cohen, and written by Miller. It was inspired by the success of Mondo Cane (1962) and was followed by a sequel Primitive London (1965).

== Reception ==
=== Box office ===
According to co-producer Tony Tenser, the film recouped its cost within six months of release.

=== Critical ===
Monthly Film Bulletin wrote: "London in the raw, not so much in the sense of nudism or even striptease (though the topic is included) as of unpleasantnesses unveiled. What we have here is something of a Mondo Cane of London town, with a distinct bias towards the unpleasant, murky or sordid. ... [The film] gets into its stride with a sequence in a betting-shop: off-course betting, no longer illegal, has developed into big business. Prostitution comes next: the filles de joie have been cleared from Soho streets, but there is no law against a girl leaning out of a window, recognising a "friend", and beckoning. ... Then, scenes of women suffering mechanised assaults on their persons in health clubs, and – the shock sequence – a clinical account of an operation to check baldness, indicate what the contemporary human is prepared to go through with in the name of appearance. ... Lighter relief follows: a Cypriot club, Jewish theatre, carnival night at a German students' club, cabaret entertainment ... showgirls in night clubs, variety entertainment in pubs. When the pubs close, the search goes on for "after hours" entertainment and roulette clubs, while the more distressed addicts drink methylated spirits or wait at Piccadilly until midnight strikes so that they can obtain their allotment of drugs at the all-night pharmacy ... Having reached this sordid point in the very early hours of the morning, the film is evidently nonplussed as to how to wind up, and resorts to the feeble device of presenting brief cuts from sequences which make up the film."

Variety wrote: "The title London In The Raw suggests a startling expose of sin and vice in the home city of Christine Keeler, et al, and undoubtedly there's a gripping documentary to be made on such a topic. But this isn't it. The title is catchpenny but should attract some business from people expecting to get a vicarious kick out of the naughty goings on in the Metropolis. But there is little spark or inventiveness in the plodding script and lacklustre delivery by David Gell. Result is a series of tired, 'on-the-surface' glimpses of the seamy side which never probe below the surface. ... Above all, it lacks courage in that its moralising is rather like a slap on the wrist with a damp lettuce leaf."

Rob Young wrote in Sight and Sound: "Arnold Miller (later a producer of Witchfinder General) wrote and directed London in the Raw and Primitive London, two mid-1960s documentaries. These are nothing like the nostalgic glimpses of a 40-year-old cityscape you find in, say, The London Nobody Knows (1967). Instead, much of the action is shot in the claustrophobic interiors of pubs, strip joints, music halls, restaurants, clinics, private addresses, even a health club (compared to Sadean tortures). Like the Mondo movies Miller loved, this offers voyeurism under a paper-thin veneer of anthropology: a montage of subcultures, vices, popular entertainers and visual cold-water-buckets including grotesque close-ups of hair transplants and corn removals, battery hens having their throats slit, beatniks eating cat food and tramps quaffing meths over a queasy musique concrète soundtrack."

The Video Librarian wrote: "London in the Raw (1964) wanders the titular city's leisure and nightlife, serving up prostitutes, ethnic enclaves, female exercise-machine workouts (quaintly considered bizarre), gimmicky restaurants, acupuncture, belly dancers/strippers, 'meth-drinker' alcoholics, drug addicts, and for real bloodmale hair-plug surgery. The film-makers were either too early or slipshod to acknowledge the 'Swinging London' culture of the era."

== Home media ==
The film was released by The British Film Institute (BFI) in 2009 on DVD (Flipside 002).
