= Thorpe & Porter =

British comic book publisher

- Thorpe & Porter's distinctive "tipi" ("T" "P") logo.
- Type: Publisher, Distributor
- Industry: Periodicals
- Founded: 1946; 80 years ago
- Founder: Fred Thorpe
- Fate: Defunct (c. 1979)
- Headquarters: Melton Road, Thurmaston; Oadby, Leicester (1946–c. 1959); 249-289 Cricklewood Broadway, London (c. 1959–1971); Columbia-Warner House; London (1971–c. 1979), United Kingdom
- Key people: Dennis Juba, William E. Kanter (1963–1966), Roger Noel Cook (1974–1979), Dez Skinn (1976–1978)2
- Products: Comics, magazines, paperback books
- Owner: Fred Thorpe / Porter Group (1946–1959); Gilberton World-Wide Publications (1959–1966)
- Number of employees: 50 (1952)
- Parent: Independent News Distributors (1966–1967); Kinney National Company (1967–1969); Warner Communications (1969–1977); W. H. Allen & Co. (1977–c. 1979)
- Divisions: Strato; Top Sellers Ltd. Brown Watson; General Books Distribution (G.B.D. Ltd.)

Thorpe & Porter (widely known as T & P) was a British publisher, importer, and distributor of magazines and comic books. At first, the company was known for repackaging American comics and pulp magazines for the UK market. Later on, it became a publisher of original material. The company released more than 160 comics titles in the UK, the most prominent being Classics Illustrated, MAD UK, Edgar Rice Burroughs' Tarzan of the Apes, Larry Harmon's Laurel & Hardy, House of Hammer, and Forbidden Worlds. T & P's most prominent imprints were Top Sellers Ltd. and Brown Watson. Thorpe & Porter operated from 1946 to c. 1979.

== Corporate history ==
=== Origins ===
Entrepreneur Fred Thorpe started with a newsagent's shop in Leicester, where he recognized the appeal of American pulp magazines and comic books. After World War II, however, the UK was intent on promoting homegrown publishers, and thus banned the direct importation of American periodicals. In 1946, Thorpe joined with the local builders merchants' company the Porter Group to form Thorpe & Porter as a publisher.

=== Relationship with Arnold Book Company ===
In 1953, T & P seems to have acquired the Arnold Book Company (ABC) as a separate line (ABC was owned by Arnold L. Miller, the "Son" in the British reprint publisher L. Miller & Son, Ltd.). Arnold Book Company appears as an imprint on the T & P titles Justice Traps the Guilty, Kid Colt, Outlaw Young Brides, and Young Romance from that point until 1958, when ABC shut down. (T & P later published a second volume of 13 issues of Justice Traps the Guilty.)

=== Marvel and DC distributor ===
In 1959, with the lifting of the UK ban on importation of American periodicals, Thorpe & Porter became the sole UK distributor of both DC and Marvel (as well as Dell, Charlton, and American Comics Group) comics. The comics were printed on American printing presses – along with a special cover giving the British price instead of the price in cents – and shipped across the Atlantic. (Marvel comics were issued with the covers altered [in the USA] to show a UK price instead of US price; whilst the cover month was removed. DC comics were franked with a circular UK price stamp after their arrival. A few Marvels were also price-stamped in a similar fashion.) Inside the front cover, with the indicia, a sentence mentioned Thorpe & Porter as sole distributor in the UK market. Thus it was that brand new American-printed copies of Fantastic Four #1, Amazing Fantasy #15, Amazing Spider-Man #1, and countless others appeared in the UK.

To aid in their comics distribution, Thorpe & Porter provided newsagents with T & P-branded spinner racks.

=== Sale to Gilberton ===
Gilberton, the U.S. publisher of Classics Illustrated (which T & P had been distributing UK editions of since 1951), acquired Thorpe & Porter from Fred Thorpe in the fall of 1959. Gilberton had launched Gilberton World-Wide Publications as a European branch in 1956, and T & P became part of its stable of European publishers. (After the sale, T & P's offices moved from Leicester to London.)

In 1962, the production of new issues of Classics Illustrated shifted from Gilberton's New York offices to Thorpe & Porter, with Gilberton's founder's son, William E. Kanter overseeing everything beginning in 1963. As a consequence, of the 181 British issues of Classics Illustrated, (Note: When reprinting issues, some issues were dropped, resulting in multiple issues, such as two versions of #152.) 13 never appeared in America (additionally, there were some variations in cover art).

=== Bankruptcy and acquisition by DC/Warner ===
In July 1966, Thorpe & Porter went bankrupt, which left many of its clients being owed substantial sums. The company was purchased by Independent News Distributors (IND), the distribution arm of National Periodical Publications (DC Comics). (Traditionally, IND distributed all DC publications, as well as those of a few rival publishers, such as Marvel Comics from 1957 to 1969, in addition to pulp and popular magazines.)

In 1967, DC and IND were purchased by Kinney National Company, which in 1969 purchased Warner Bros.-Seven Arts and became Warner Communications. As a result of all this consolidation, by 1969 T & P's comics output became almost exclusively reprints of DC titles, as well as Larry Harmon's Laurel & Hardy, a color comic book series based on the Laurel & Hardy animated TV series.

In 1971, Warner's international distribution operations merged with Columbia Pictures to form Columbia-Warner Distributors. Thorpe & Porter moved its offices to the Columbia-Warner House in Soho, London; as now part of Warner Communications, the Thorpe & Porter brand was mostly replaced by Williams Publishing. (Thanks to Gilberton World-Wide Publications, Williams had European-language divisions in Denmark, Finland, France, Germany, Italy, the Netherlands, and Sweden; most of these publishers were sold off around 1979.)

In 1976, British editor Dez Skinn was brought in to expand the comics arm of Williams Publishing. He took over editing MAD UK, Edgar Rice Burroughs' Tarzan of the Apes, Edgar Rice Burroughs' Korak, Son of Tarzan, and the Laurel & Hardy comic. He also launched House of Hammer.

=== Sale to W. H. Allen and closure ===
Warner sold its publishing division, including Thorpe & Porter, to W. H. Allen & Co. in 1977, which in 1978 decided to close it down (with Skinn almost immediately moving on to the top position at Marvel UK). This spelled the end of most of T & P's titles, except for MAD UK and the Brown Watson line. Former T & P production editor Ron Letchford acquired the rights to MAD UK. He formed Suron International for this purpose, eventually selling the license to London Editions, which later merged with Fleetway Publications. MAD UK finally ended its run in 1994. For their part, the Babani brothers of Brown Watson retained the various licenses for their hardback annuals, and in 1979 formed a new company, Grandreams, to continue publishing them. Grandreams lasted through at least 1996. After his stint at Marvel UK, in 1982 Skinn started Quality Communications and revived House of Hammer (as Halls of Horror); he continued the magazine until 1984.

== Publications ==
=== Paperback books ===
Thorpe & Porter started out as a publisher of lurid and sensationalist paperback books, originally in digest size and later in the more traditional format. T & P set up a number of imprints – Hermitage Publications, Knole Park Press, Beacon Publishing Co. Ltd., Strato Publications, and Jewel Books – and in the period 1947 to 1953 published over 60 titles, by such authors as Frank Fawcett (writing under the pen name "Ben Sarto"), George C. Foster, Paul Renin, and Leslie A. Scott. T & P also distributed similar paperbacks from other publishers, including Muir-Watson and Robin Hood Press.

The paperback craze died down in the period 1951 to 1953, partly as the result of Home Office clampdowns on "obscene and objectionable publications;" and by the end of 1953, T & P was no longer in the paperback publication business.

=== Pulp and digest format British magazines ===
Next, T & P moved into the realm of pulp and digest format science fiction and fantasy magazines. Setting up relationships with American publishers Ziff-Davis and Columbia Publications (which were eager to license their content due to the declining popularity of pulps in the U.S.), and also with Galaxy Publications and Quinn, T & P licensed British reprint editions of their new digest format magazines. The company published reprints in this capacity from 1949 to 1960, first under their Strato Publications imprint and then under the parent Thorpe & Porter imprint, most notably with the titles Amazing Stories and Fantastic Adventures (Ziff-Davis), Beyond Fantasy Fiction, Galaxy Science Fiction (Galaxy), and If (Quinn, then Galaxy), as well as Weird Tales, a long-established independent fantasy & horror magazine.

The T & P pulp editions frequently differed from their American originals in issue numbering, publication sequence, frequency, and editorial content, with some titles featuring independently numbered runs and others reprinting selected issues out of their original order:

- Weird Tales – 28 issues published between November 1949 and July 1954, initially monthly and later bimonthly.
- Amazing Stories – 32 issues published between June 1950 and February 1955, initially in pulp format and later in digest size.
- Fantastic Adventures – 24 issues published between June 1950 and February 1954, consisting of abridged versions of the American editions.
- Future Science Fiction and Science Fiction Stories – 14 issues published between November 1951 and June 1954.
- Science Fiction Quarterly – 10 issues published between February 1952 and August 1955.
- Fantastic – eight issues published between December 1953 and February 1955.
- Galaxy Science Fiction – far and away the most successful of T & P's British reprint editions, published from 1953 to 1962, with 94 numbered issues.

In the 1960s, T & P distributed the British science fiction magazines New Worlds and Science Fantasy (also known as SF Impulse), published by Roberts & Vinter. When in July 1966 Thorpe & Porter went bankrupt (see below) while owing Roberts & Vinter a substantial sum, the resulting financial pressure led Roberts & Vinter to decide to focus on their more profitable magazines, and the February 1967 issue of SF Impulse was the last, though its sister magazine New Worlds, survived via an Arts Council grant.

=== Comics ===
Because of the UK importation ban, in the 1940s and 1950s American comics typically arrived in the UK as ballast on ships.

T & P got into the comics business – primarily with reprints – in the 1950s with a selection of romance, western, and war comics, reprinted in black-and-white from American companies like Gilberton, American Comics Group, Atlas Comics, Crestwood Publications, Dell Comics, and National Periodical Publications (now DC Comics). Thorpe & Porter was one of the first British publishers to print its own clean versions of the comics, "using blocks made from imported American matrices."

Right off the bat, Thorpe & Porter's most successful comics title was Classics Illustrated and later the spinoff title Pixi Tales (the company's new name for Classics Illustrated Junior, which featured fairy tale adaptations). T & P published Classics Illustrated reprints (and a few original stories) from 1951 to 1963; Pixi Tales, meanwhile, lasted 87 issues, from 1959 to 1963. UK issues of Classics Illustrated that were never published in the United States include Aeneid, The Argonauts, The Gorilla Hunters and Sail with the Devil. Mick Anglo adapted three stories – by Edgar Allan Poe, Oscar Wilde, and Wilkie Collins – for the T & P Classics Illustrated. The British Classics Illustrated adaptation of the James Bond film Dr. No was never published under the U.S. Classics Illustrated line (making it a collector's item in the States), but instead was sold to DC Comics, which published it as part of their superhero anthology series, Showcase. (The comic followed the plot of the film with images of the film's actors rather than Ian Fleming's original novel.)

In the period 1951 to 1953, Thorpe & Porter acquired a number of fellow British publisher Arnold Book Company's reprint titles, including Justice Traps the Guilty, Young Brides, Young Eagle, and Young Love. (When T & P acquired Justice Traps the Guilty, it continued the numbering of the ABC version; with the other titles, T & P restarted the numbering at #1.)

The T & P imprint Strato (originally created for its paperback line) published thirteen issues of a Mystery in Space reprint, a 68-page A4-size magazine, between 1954 and 1956. It featured black-and-white reprints of DC's Mystery In Space and Strange Adventures stories with slightly adapted covers from the original Mystery In Space series. T & P published a hardback Mystery In Space Annual in 1968. Although it used the cover to Mystery In Space #95, the contents of the annual were complete random issues of remaindered comics from a number of companies including their covers, and not Mystery In Space stories.

Other reprint titles with which T & P had some success included Blackhawk, Gene Autry Comics, Forbidden Worlds, Kid Colt, Outlaw, Tomahawk, and Young Romance.

In October 1959, T & P began publishing MAD UK. The British version of Mad magazine received access to the publication's back catalog of articles and was also encouraged to produce its own localized material in the Mad vein. Essentially, T & P repackaged Mad to a 32-page monthly from a 48-page-eight-times-a-year U.S. publication. Conflicts over content occasionally arose between the parent magazine and its international franchisee; when a comic strip satirizing the English royal family was reprinted in a Mad paperback, it was deemed necessary to rip out the page from 25,000 copies by hand before the book could be distributed in Great Britain. MAD UK was published by T & P from 1959 to 1979, and then continued on with other publishers until 1994, producing 290 issues in all.

The Brown Watson (Note: Not the same as the publisher formed in 1980 and located in Leicestershire.) imprint, launched in the early 1950s, originally published genre paperbacks like Sinister Forces by Alvin Westwood (1953) and The Horror from the Hills by Frank Belknap Long (1965). In the period 1959 to 1966, Brown Watson published T & P's war comics series Conflict Picture Library (200 issues, 1959–1966) and Romance in Pictures (235 issues, 1960–1966), the latter of which featured stories reprinted and translated from Spanish romance comics. Other long-running titles from the 1960s included Pocket War Library and World Illustrated (reprints from Gilberton's World Around Us series).

In 1966, T & P published a 68-page Avengers comic, with original art by Mick Anglo and Mick Austin consisting of four 16-page stories. Anglo also illustrated comics version of the television series Charles Rand and Danger Man.

Between 1967 and 1970, T & P released an unusual line of 128-page comics called Double Double. Each issue was made up of four remaindered DC comics (with their covers removed) glued together with a new cover. (Most covers were probably illustrated by UK artists.) 24 Double Double titles were published, mostly featuring Superman or Batman (and their associated supporting characters). The titles with the most issues were Action Double Double Comics (5 issues), Adventure Double Double Comics (4 issues), and Batman Double Double Comics, Detective Double Double Comics, and Superboy Double Double Comics (3 issues each). According to owners of some of the comics, the oddest thing about the Double Double line was, "not all issues had the same four comics inside. It was possible to purchase two copies of Double Double Detective #3 and find different coverless DC issues within. It was even possible to sometimes find a Marvel comic mixed in with the DCs!"

In the 1970s, the Brown Watson imprint was known for the hardback comics annuals it published based on popular film, television, animation, and comics properties. The annuals featured a mix of comic strips and illustrated text stories. (The hardcover annuals tradition was a staple of the UK comics scene; the company most known for this type of publication was World Distributors, which started producing them in the 1950s.) Brown Watson's most popular, long-running annuals were Hanna Barbera Scooby Doo Where Are You... (8 annuals, 1973–1980), Tarzan (7 annuals, 1972–1979), Laurel and Hardy (6 annuals, 1969–1980), Superman/Batman with Robin the Boy Wonder Annual (5 annuals, 1974–1978), and Planet of the Apes (3 annuals, 1975–1977). Artists who worked on the annuals included John Bolton, Ian Gibson, and David Lloyd. Brown Watson was run by the brothers Brian Babani and Peter Babani.

Most of T & P's other publications in the 1970s were listed under the Top Sellers Ltd. imprint. Formatted like American comics, with 32 pages of content, the company's most successful comics launched during this period included the long-running titles Funny Half Hour, Edgar Rice Burroughs Tarzan of the Apes, Edgar Rice Burroughs Korak, Son of Tarzan, and the various Pocket Library titles, particularly Western Library, Chiller Library, and Romance Library. Skinn's House of Hammer was a horror-themed magazine of all original content, which combined text articles with comic strips, and helped launch the careers of a number of British comics creators, including Steve Moore, Brian Bolland, John Bolton, and David Lloyd. Skinn and Brown Watson line editor John Barraclough often used some of the same artists for their comics properties. House of Hammer was given the 1977 Eagle Award for "Favourite Specialist Comics Publication – Pro." Mad UK, meanwhile, won the 1977 Eagle Award for "Favourite Black & White Comicbook – Humour."

=== Men's magazines ===
Starting in the 1950s, Thorpe & Porter published a number of men's magazines of questionable taste, an early title being Clubman, and another being Comic Cuties.

In the 1960s and 1970s, T & P and then Williams published a line of softcore pornography magazines with titles like Sex International News, True Love Stories, Cinema X, Cinema Blue, Parade, Game, Blade, Voi, and Sensuous. Many copies of those magazines were seized and forfeited in a series of police raids in 1972 and again in 1975. In response, in 1976 Williams created the General Books Distribution (G.B.D. Ltd.) imprint for its adults-only titles.

== Imprints ==
- Arnold Book Company (1953–1958) – comics
- Beacon Publishing Co. Ltd. (1948–1951) – paperback books
- Brown, Watson Ltd. (c. 1956–c. 1979) – Conflict Picture Library and Romance in Pictures in the early part of the 1960s, standard format paperbacks after ceasing to use the Digit Books imprint, and hardback annuals in the 1970s
- Digit Books (wholly owned paperback imprint of Brown, Watson Ltd.) (1956 – 1966) – general and category fiction, and some non-fiction, initially; standard format paperback books
- General Books Distribution (G.B.D. Ltd.) (1977–1978) – men's magazine titles (like Cinema X and Parade, and, originally, The House of Hammer)
- Hermitage (1947–1948; 1952–1953) – initially a paperback imprint, then used for some comics
- Jenson (1952–1953) – comics
- Jewel Books (1949–1954) – paperback books
- Knole Park Press (1948–1949) – paperback books
- Strato Publications (1949–1962) – originally paperback books, then science fiction and fantasy digest format magazine reprints, and science fiction, super-hero and western comics reprints
- Thorpe & Porter (c. 1951–1965) – pulp magazine reprints; science fiction and fantasy digest magazine format reprints after the closure of the Strato Publications imprint through the 1966 bankruptcy, though over-stamping U.S. editions at the end; and the Classics Illustrated comics line
- Top Sellers Ltd.(c. 1956–c. 1979) – most comics and magazines
- Williams Publishing and Distributing Co. Ltd. (1971–1977) – men's magazines; Tarzan and Korak comics, and other comics titles

== Titles published (selected) ==
=== Pulp magazines ===
Title	Issues published	Publication Dates	Reprinted issues	Notes
Amazing Stories	32	1950–1954	June 1953, December 1952, and January 1954	First 24 issues were pulp-sized; the last eight were digests.
Dynamic Science Fiction	3	1954	June 1953, December 1952, and January 1954	Source:
Fantastic	8	1953–1955	Sept./Oct. 1953–Dec. 1954	
Fantastic Adventures	24	1950–1954	Mar. 1950–Jan. 1953	
Fantastic Novels	1	1954	May 1949	Published by Pembertons and distributed by Thorpe & Porter; undated, but numbered 1. Source:
Future Science Fiction and Science Fiction Stories	14	1951–1954	Mar. 1951–Mar. 1954	
Marvel Science Stories	1	1951	Feb. 1951	
Science Fiction Quarterly	10	1952–1955	May 1951–May 1954	
Super Science Stories	3	1949–1950	Jan. 1949, Nov. 1949, Jan. 1950	
Weird Tales	28	1949–1954	July 1949–May 1954 (with many issues skipped)	In two volumes

=== T & P Comics ===
Titles that published 30 or more issues.

- Benjy and His Friends (Thorpe & Porter, 30 issues, 1971–1972) – translations of a European children's comic
- Blackhawk (Thorpe & Porter, 37 issues, 1956–1958)
- Classics Illustrated (Thorpe & Porter, 181 issues, Oct. 1951–June 1963)
- Fox and Crow (Thorpe & Porter, 31 issues, early 1970s)
- Gene Autry Comics (Thorpe & Porter, 36 issues, 1953–1954)
- Edgar Rice Burroughs Korak, Son of Tarzan (Thorpe & Porter, 71 issues, 1971–1976)
- Edgar Rice Burroughs Tarzan of the Apes [1st series] (Thorpe & Porter, 7 issues, 1970–1971)
- Edgar Rice Burroughs Tarzan of the Apes [2nd series] (Thorpe & Porter, 116 issues, 3 March 1971 – 1975)
- Forbidden Worlds (Thorpe & Porter, 145 issues, 1950–1969)
- Funny Half Hour (Thorpe & Porter, 171 issues, 1970–1979)
- Golden Hours (Williams, 31 issues, 1972)
- House of Hammer (Top Sellers/General Books, 23 issues, Oct. 1976–July 1978) – changed title to Hammer's House of Horror and Hammer's Halls of Horror; later revived as Halls of Horror by Quality Communications
- Kid Colt Outlaw (Thorpe & Porter, 58 issues, 1950–1960) – contained black-and-white reprints from both Atlas Comics and DC Comics
- Larry Harmon's Laurel & Hardy (Thorpe & Porter, 142 issues plus eight extra-large issues, 1969–1974)
- Mad (Thorpe & Porter, 290 issues, Oct. 1959–June 1986)
- Pixi Tales (Thorpe & Porter, 87 issues, 1959–1963)
- Pocket Chiller Library (Thorpe & Porter, 137 issues, 1971–1977) – reprints of Italian and Spanish horror comics followed by some original stories by European and British creators
- Pocket Detective Library (Thorpe & Porter, 67 issues, early 1970s)
- Pocket Romance Library (Thorpe & Porter, 113 issues, 1971–1974)
- Pocket War Library (Thorpe & Porter, 229 issues, 1965–1972)
- Pocket Western Library (Thorpe & Porter, 188 issues, 1970s)
- Tomahawk (Thorpe & Porter, 41 issues, 1954–1957)
- World Illustrated (Thorpe & Porter, 34 issues, 1960–1963)
- Yogi and His Toy / Hanna-Barbera's Fun Time (Williams, 60 total issues, 1972–1973)
- Young Brides (Thorpe & Porter, 38 issues, 1953–1955)
- Young Love (Thorpe & Porter, 46 issues, 1953–1955)
- Young Romance (Thorpe & Porter, 39 issues, 1953–1955)

=== Brown Watson annuals ===
- Batman & Robin Annual (1972)
- The Bionic Woman (2 issues, 1977–1978)
- Casper's Ghostland Annual (1973)
- Charlie Chaplin Annual (1974)
- Flash Gordon Annual (2 issues, 1968 and 1981)
- The Flintstones Annual (1976)
- The Funky Phantom Annual (1974)
- The Gemini Man Annual (1978)
- The Great Grape Ape Annual (2 issues, 1977–1978) – 1977 annual featured Hong Kong Phooey; 1978 annual featured Boss Cat
- Hanna Barbera Scooby Doo Where Are You... Annual (8 issues, 1973–1980)
- The Harlem Globetrotters Annual Featuring Dastardly and Muttley and The Perils of Penelope Pitstop (1973)
- Inch High Private Eye & Pixie & Dixie Annual (1977)
- Laurel and Hardy Annual (6 issues, 1969–1980)
- Logan's Run Annual (1978)
- The Magician Annual (1975)
- Marvel Presents the Superheroes Annual (1978)
- The Muppet Show Annual (1978)
- The New Avengers Annual (2 issues, 1977–1978)
- The Pink Panther Annual (1976)
- Planet of the Apes Annual (3 issues, 1975–1977)
- Popeye Annual (2 issues, 1972–1976)
- Science Fiction in Pictures Outer Space (2 issues, 1963)
- The Six Million Dollar Man Annual (3 issues, 1977–1979)
- Star Wars Annual (1978)
- Superman Annual (1972)
- Superman/Batman with Robin the Boy Wonder Annual (5 issues, 1974–1978)
- The Sweeney Annual (2 issues, 1977 & 1978)
- Tarzan Annual (7 issues, [Sept.] 1972–[Sept.] 1979)
- Wacky Races Annual (3 issues, 1973–1976) – 1973 annual featured Motormouse and Autocat; 1975 annual featured the Harlem Globetrotters

== See also ==
- W.H. Smith
- John Menzies
- World Distributors
- L. Miller & Son
- Alan Class Comics
- Odhams Press
- Marvel UK
