= Justice Traps the Guilty =

American comic book series

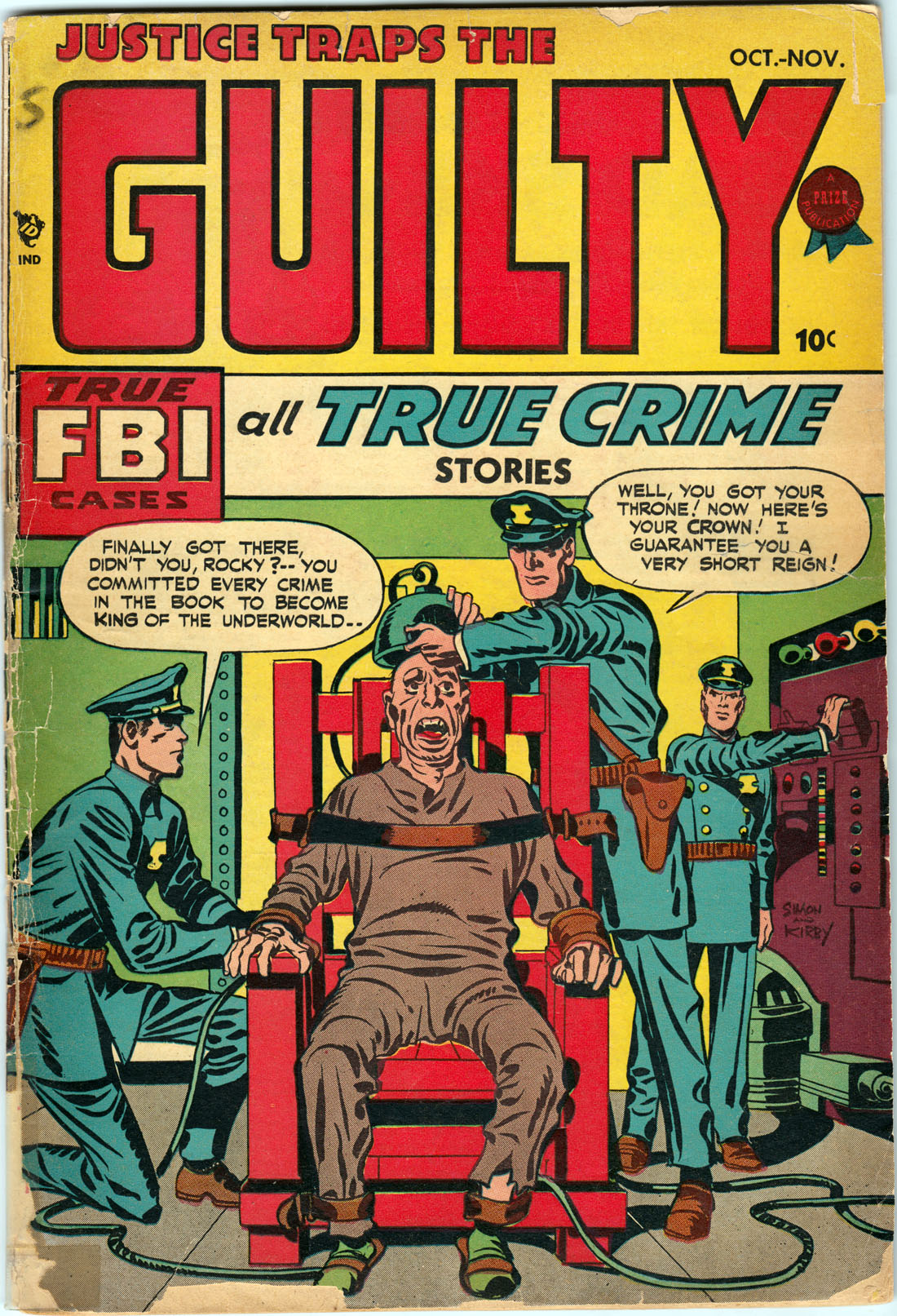
- Cover art for Justice Traps the Guilty #1. Pencils by Jack Kirby, coloring by Joe Simon.

Publication information
- Publisher: Prize Comics
- Schedule: Monthly; Bimonthly; Monthly
- Format: Standard Golden Age
- Genre: Crime
- Publication date: October/November 1947 – April–May 1958
- No. of issues: 92

Creative team
- Created by: Joe Simon; Jack Kirby

Justice Traps the Guilty was an American comic book title, a publication of the crime comics genre created by Joe Simon and Jack Kirby and published by Prize Comics from 1947 to 1958. It followed the successful revamping of Headline Comics (For The American Boy) by Simon and Kirby, beginning in March 1947.

== Publication history ==
Justice Traps the Guilty began with an October/November 1947 issue. It returned to newsstands in the first part of 1948. Simon and Kirby accounted for the majority of the covers, along with one or two stories in each issue.

The last issue was #92, which was published in May 1958.
