= Malcolm Mitchell (musician) =

English musician (1926–1998)

Malcolm Mitchell (9 November 1926 – 9 March 1998) was an English jazz guitarist and bandleader. His Mitchell Trio, with pianist Johnny Pearson and Teddy Broughton on bass, became well known supporting US jazzmen and singers touring in the UK but caught by the powerful local Musicians' Union ban on non-union foreign musicians. The Mitchell Trio played with acts including Duke Ellington, Hoagy Carmichael and the singer Maxine Sullivan. Mitchell was born in London and died in Bognor Regis, West Sussex, aged 71.
