= Primitive London =

1965 British film by Arnold Louis Miller

- Directed by: Arnold Louis Miller
- Written by: Arnold Louis Miller
- Produced by: Arnold Louis Miller
- Starring: MacDonald Hobley; Billy J. Kramer; Diana Noble
- Cinematography: Stanley A. Long
- Edited by: Stephen Cross
- Release date: 1965
- Running time: 87 minutes
- Country: United Kingdom
- Language: English

Primitive London is a 1965 British film directed, written and produced by Arnold Louis Miller and starring MacDonald Hobley, Billy J. Kramer and Diana Noble. It was the sequel to Miller's London in the Raw (1964).

== Plot ==
The film is a montage of scenes including striptease, the birth of a baby, how to kill a battery chicken, interviews with mods, rockers and beatniks, and a staged swingers' party.

== Cast ==
- MacDonald Hobley as himself in TV studio
- Billy J. Kramer as himself at record shop
- Diana Noble as herself at Churchills
- Bobby Chandler as himself at Churchills
- Vicki Grey as herself at Churchills
- John Lee as himself at Churchills
- Ray Martine as himself at Establishment Club
- David Gell as narrator
- Barry Cryer as advertising executive in TV studio
- The Zephyrs as themselves at nightclub
- Terry Dene as himself at record shop

== Critical reception ==
The Monthly Film Bulletin wrote: "Modishly cynical and negative exposé of the obvious: strip-tease, the birth of a baby, how to kill a battery chicken, a rippling tour of a musclebound man's torso, TV-type interviews with Mods, Rockers, Beatniks and strippers, an uncomfortably staged party during which married couples pair off with partners picked out by the luck of the draw. This, we are told incessantly by narrator David Gell, is London today: not that that precludes an unabashed reconstruction of "one of Jack the Ripper's murders". The colour, perhaps appropriately, is hideous. The tedium has no bounds."

Kine Weekly wrote: "The producers have played safe by putting the emphasis heavily on girls who are either largely undressed or undressing. Although some of the scenes must have been rehearsed, the picture has a general atmosphere of actuality. ... Among the artists appearing are Ray Martine, Billy J. Kramer, Diana Noble, Vicki Grey, and MacDonald Hobley, who gets some fun out of a skit on making a TV commercial that is, perhaps, not too far from the truth."

Variety wrote: "Primitive London is a ramshackle affair which looks as If the makers have gathered together a motley collection of odd-man-out sequences bearing little relation to each other and somehow strung them together under umbrella of a specious, narrative theme. The script waffles along purportedly describing the search for identity of a human being. ... Editing is shaky, Eastman Color lensing variable and the commentary over-gabby. ... Some of the sequences, taken independently, are directed by Arnold Louis Miller with perception and vitality, but and overall effect is one of a ragbag miscellany. ... David Gell puts over the commentary and does a sound professional job considering the verbiage with which he has to wrestle."

Sight and Sound wrote: "As a guide through the moral mazes of its day, the narration is confused and conflicted. Bookended by footage of a live birth, Primitive London is framed as a kind of inversion of Humphrey Jennings' A Diary for Timothy (1945), only here the subtext is: what kind of a sick society are you being bom into, little one?"

== Home media ==
The film was released by The British Film Institute (BFI) in 2009 on DVD (Flipside 003).
