= My Bare Lady (film) =

1963 British film by Arthur Knight

- Poster
- Directed by: Arthur Knight
- Written by: Jervis MacArthur
- Produced by: Tony Tenser (as "Phineas Lonestar Jnr")
- Starring: Carl Conway; Julie Martin
- Music by: De Wolfe
- Release date: 6 December 1962
- Running time: 64 min.
- Country: United Kingdom
- Language: English

My Bare Lady (also known as Bare Lady, Bare World, It's a Bare World and My Seven Little Bares) is a 1963 British exploitation film directed by Arthur Knight and starring Julie Martin and Carl Conway. It was written by Jervis MacArthur and is associated with a cycle of nudist films in British cinema in the late 1950s and early 1960s. The film features a cameo appearance by the noted American photographer Arthur "Weegee" Fellig as a judge in a beauty contest.

== Plot ==
Tina, a young American woman visiting Great Britain, meets and falls in love with Pat, a U.S. Korean War veteran who is involved with a local nudist camp. The young woman is initially distressed at the man's clothing-free lifestyle, but later changes her mind and sheds her garments when Mrs. Darwell, the kindly housekeeper, relates a romantic story of a young couple who fell in love in Paris and later married at a British nudist colony.

== Cast ==
- Julie Martin as Tina
- Carl Conway as Pat
- Nina Huntredos as Mrs. Darwell
- Kenneth McClelland
- Chantal Delors
- Gilly Gerard
- Jack Taylor
- Bob Bryant
- Leslie Crawford
- Arthur Fellig

== Critical reception ==
Monthly Film Bulletin said "The 'story' is ludicrously naive, and the nudist content, filmed at the North Kent Sun Club, Orpington, consists of the usual lazing around and swimming, plus a slight novelty in a nudist beauty contest: it should be pointed out, however, that the entrants in the contest are filmed in close-up, so that judging is, apparently, on facial beauty alone."
