= Miracleman (character) =

Comic book character

- Miracleman on the cover of the Miracleman Book 3 - Olympus collected edition. Art by John Totleben.

Character information
- First appearance: Marvelman #25 (1954)
- Created by: Mick Anglo

In-story information
- Alter ego: Michael John "Mike" Moran
- Species: Human mutate
- Place of origin: Earth
- Team affiliations: Miracleman Family
- Partnerships: Young Miracleman (Note: Since licensing the characters from Mick Anglo in 2009, Marvel Comics have used the Marvelman name for original 1954-1963 appearances and the Miracleman name for revival material.); Kid Miracleman; Miraclewoman; Qys; Warpsmiths; Huey Moon
- Notable aliases: Micky; Marvelman
- Abilities: Superhuman strength, speed, stamina, and senses; Concussive energy blasts; Invulnerability; Force fields; Telekinesis; Telepathy; Longevity; Flight; Genius-level intellect; Age empowerment; Reality manipulation

Publication information
- Publisher: L. Miller & Son, Ltd. (1954–1963); Quality Communications (1982–1985); Eclipse Comics (1985–1993); Marvel Comics (2010–present)
- Genre: Superhero
- Publication date: February 1954

Miracleman (originally known as Marvelman), whose civilian name is Michael "Mike" Moran, is a British Golden Age comic book superhero appearing in comic books first published by L. Miller & Son, Ltd. Created by Mick Anglo, the character first appeared in Marvelman #25 (February 1954) with his Earth set on Earth-82324. The character was revived by Dez Skinn in 1982, with Alan Moore and Garry Leach as the creative team on Marvelman in the pages of Warrior. After that publication was cancelled, the revival was continued as Miracleman by Eclipse Comics in 1985, with the character renamed accordingly, but went out of print following the company's demise in 1994. After a 15-year hiatus brought on by a legal dispute over the character's ownership, the character was successfully brought back into print by Marvel Comics in 2010, initially presenting classic material under the Marvelman name. From 2014 onwards, Marvel began reprinting the revival material, once again using the Miracleman name, and in 2022 began continuing the story.

By 2026, an Earth-616 Miracleman named David Colton appeared during the "Avengers: Armageddon" storyline.

== Concept and creation ==
Following Fawcett Publications' cessation of their superhero titles in 1953, British publisher L. Miller & Son were left with the prospect of having to cancel their popular Captain Marvel and Captain Marvel Jr. weeklies due to a lack of material. Len Miller contacted Mick Anglo, whose Gower Street Studio had provided cover artwork and other material for Miller's titles, to create a replacement. Anglo modified Captain Marvel, changing his human identity from newsboy Billy Batson to copyboy Micky Moran. The character's superhuman form was changed from Captain Marvel to Marvelman, after consideration was given to naming the new character Captain Miracle and Miracleman—both names that would later be used by Anglo for further derivatives of Captain Marvel. Anglo took the opportunity to simplify the character's costume, eliminating Captain Marvel's cape and switching his lightning bolt to a simpler "MM" chest logo. To provide greater contrast Marvelman was given close-cropped blond hair and a predominantly blue colour scheme. Anglo considered giving the character a gravity belt but eventually decided to retain flight as an inherent ability of the superhero.

While Marvelman and (less frequently, despite debuting concurrently) Young Marvelman are occasionally called the first British superheroes this is not the case as the short-lived DC Thomson Dandy character The Amazing Mr. X debuted some ten years previously.

== Publication history ==
=== 1954–1963 ===
Due to the backlog of Fawcett material Miller already had the company was able to prepare readers for the upcoming change. Captain Marvel #19, dated 19 December 1953, featured an in-character letter from 'Batson' to readers, telling them he planned to lead an ordinary life and would be handing over his duties to Marvelman; #24 featured the modified title Captain Marvel - the Marvelman and from #25 the title was renamed Marvelman, with the new character taking over. A similar process would take place on sister title Captain Marvel Jr., which would become Young Marvelman. The result was well-received by readers, and sales of Marvelman were actually larger than those of its predecessor. Anglo initially wrote and drew the strips himself; later other Gower Studio artists would work on the character, including James Bleach, Norman Light and Don Lawrence. Marvelman would also occasionally appear in the pages of Young Marvelman and later starred the additional monthly title Marvelman Family, which also featured Kid Marvelman. However by 1961 sales were declining as imported American comics began to arrive on the British market, featuring full-colour strips rather than the black-and-white adventures of Marvelman. Miller switched Marvelman to a monthly reprint title, causing Anglo to unsuccessfully attempt to set up his own Anglo Features label after turning down an offer to work for Miller's son Arnold on his own venture. Marvelman finally ended in 1963, and the character went into obscurity.

=== 1982–1985 ===
In 1981 Dez Skinn opted to revive the character for anthology Warrior, without permission to do so from Mick Anglo, who was still owner of the rights to the character. After Skinn's preferred choices of creators for the revival turned him down, he became aware of Alan Moore's similar interest in reviving the character, and requested a proposal. Impressed by the writer's ideas, Skinn commissioned Moore as writer for the strip, which debuted in the first issue of Warrior in March 1982. Moore would later relate that he was drawn to the character's resemblance to the concept of the Übermensch from the writings of Friedrich Nietzsche, a concept that would be frequently drawn on in this revival. After other artists had demurred, Garry Leach was assigned to draw the strip. Leach modelled the revised Marvelman on actor Paul Newman and redesigned the chest insignia into a more modern style. Leach and Moore opted for a graceful look for the character in contrast to the more common musclebound superhero archetype.

The strip was a critical success, winning Favourite Comic Character (UK) at the 1984 Eagle Awards, and continued to be a success when Alan Davis took over as artist. Vintage Gower Street material would also be reprinted in the one-off Marvelman Special, with the conceit it presented imaginary adventures of the character. However, creative differences between Moore and Davis would lead to the strip stalling in 1985. The dispute would prevent the strip from returning before Warrior was cancelled in 1985, after financial losses producing the magazine became unsustainable for Skinn.

=== 1985–1993 ===
The story was eventually picked up by American publisher Eclipse Comics in 1985. To avoid legal attention from Marvel Comics the series and its leads were renamed Miracleman; Moore had previously suggested this as an alternate title in his original proposal as a substitute name should the editor decide against reviving Marvelman, and had also used it in print for the name of a proxy version of the character that had featured briefly in his parallel work on Marvel UK's Captain Britain strip. Those involved do not appear to have been aware of the name being previously considered by Anglo, or its use as the name given to a series of British reprints of the artist's Spanish-market Superhombre. Moore was initially resistant to the name change due to Marvelman having predated the establishment of Marvel Comics but eventually agreed, though he would air his dissatisfaction with the issue in an essay printed in the second issue of the title. Eclipse began by printing coloured, relettered versions of the Warrior material before Miracleman #7 (cover dated April 1986) saw the story continue with new material. The series continued its critical success, and was by Eclipse's standards a sizeable commercial success. Initially Chuck Austen (then using his birthname Chuck Beckum) drew the new adventures before Rick Veitch continued the work. From Miracleman #11, John Totleben became regular artist until #16, which was also the final issue of Moore's run.

Moore then passed over the title to Neil Gaiman, having completed the stories he had planned for the character. Gaiman and new artist Mark Buckingham planned three six-issue storylines for the character, and opted for an anthology approach for the initial arc. As such "The Golden Age" focused more on Miracleman's impact on Earth than the character himself, who was more felt than seen across Miracleman #17-22, largely featuring in cameos by various literary devices such as flashbacks, imaginary sequences and fictions-within-fictions. Meanwhile, Gaiman found that numerous other creators were interested in working on the character; to harness this and expand their revenue, Eclipse produced the three-issue limited series Miracleman: Apocrypha, featuring contributions by the likes of Alex Ross, Kurt Busiek, Matt Wagner, James Robinson, and Darick Robertson. Gaiman and Buckingham provided a framing story for the series which established it as a collection of imaginary stories. Miracleman returned to being more central in the creative team's second arc, "The Silver Age". However, after only two issues of the storyline had been published Eclipse went bankrupt; this also prevented the publication of another spin-off mini-series called Miracleman Triumphant, written by Fred Burke and drawn by Mike Deodato and taking place between Gaiman's first two arcs.

=== 1995–2008 ===
Even though Mick Anglo had never ceded rights to the character, Gaiman mistakenly believed at the time he owned a one-third share of the rights to the Miracleman characters, with the other two-thirds residing with Eclipse. Gaiman reached an arrangement with Charlton Media Group to purchase Eclipse's rights, in order to continue the series with the Canadian publisher. However at the 1996 liquidation auction Charlton Media was outbid by Todd McFarlane Productions. Gaiman began legal action while McFarlane remained sure he owned the character, and produced Miracleman merchandise, all while Mick Anglo had retained rights to the character. A reimagined Mike Moran, now a principled journalist at the New York Daily Times, was added to the supporting cast of Hellspawn, a dark spin-off title of Spawn, in February 2001. Artist Ashley Wood released teaser images of Miracleman ahead of his planned debut in Hellspawn #12. However, Wood left the book after Hellspawn #11 and the storyline was abandoned when Gaiman sued McFarlane in 2002. In-universe, the appearances were subsequently ascribed to the character Man of Miracles, whose aspect is shaped by the perceptions of others. Since 2001, Marvel editor-in-chief Joe Quesada had been among the major industry figures to support Gaiman in the dispute.

=== 2009–present ===
Marvel eventually discovered in 2009 that the rights to the Marvelman characters had resided with Anglo all along, having never been purchased by Dez Skinn (who believed the character was in the public domain) in 1981, rendering all claims to the character's rights by Skinn, Eclipse Comics, Todd McFarlane Productions and Neil Gaiman as invalid.

Marvel licensed the characters from Anglo directly and in 2010 began a series of reprints of classic material under the Marvelman name. In 2014 after legal rights to the revival material were secured from all the creators, Marvel began to reprint the revival material, now named Miracleman once again. All of the artists that illustrated the revival material actively participated with Marvel to restore it for modern production, and received royalties for reprint collections of this work, while Alan Moore refused credit as writer of his stories from the revival material, and instead directed that his royalties from the revival material be paid to the estate of Mick Anglo. Marvel published new material with the character in 2015, and Miracleman's logo was featured in the one-shot Timeless in 2021, foreshadowing his introduction into the Marvel Universe, which happened in September 2026.

In October 2022, Gaiman and Buckingham continued The Silver Age storyline after a hiatus of nearly 30 years.

== Fictional character biography ==
=== Michael Moran ===
Having discovered the keyword to the universe through his experiments, Mississippi-based astro-scientist Guntag Barghelt travels the world searching for a worthy recipient of this power. After young Michael Moran first attempts to return a dime Barghelt dropped and then defends the scientist from a trio of hoodlums, the scientist takes the youth to his laboratory. There further tests reveal Michael has absolute integrity and a well-defined discernment of good and evil, and treats him in his atomic machine. Michael is granted the power to turn into the superpowered Marvelman whenever he speaks the keyword "Kimota". After Marvelman thwarts an attempt by the villainous Herman Schwein to capture Barghelt's notes, the scientist withdraws to an asteroid in outer space, knowing Marvelman will protect good on Earth. Michael works for the Daily Bugle newspaper as a copyboy and keeps his superhero identity secret from the world while using his power to protect the innocent. To help him fight evil, Marvelman would later call on the scientist again when impressed by the courage of messenger boy Dicky Dauntless and calls up Barghelt once again. The scientist gives Dicky an elixir that allows him to transform into Young Marvelman, who would become Marvelman's ally in the fight against evil. Marvelman later selected another youth, Johnny Bates, who was granted the ability to become Kid Marvelman. He would also team up with Young Marvelman and Kid Marvelman as the Marvelman Family.

==== Revival ====
===== Book One: 'A Dream of Flying' – written by Alan Moore =====
Two decades later, Mike Moran is a middle-aged man working as a freelance journalist and happily married to a woman named Liz Sullivan, but he is suffering from mid-life crisis and is plagued by headaches. He remembers nothing of his adventures as Miracleman, but has recurring nightmares of flying and of the terrible fate that apparently befell the Miracleman family when they were caught in a nuclear explosion.

When a peaceful protest at an atomic power station is overtaken by terrorists, Moran is present and is taken hostage. He deliriously sees the 'magic word' (that has eluded him for decades but haunts his dreams) written on a glass door: 'Kimota'. When Moran speaks this aloud he transforms into Miracleman, incapacitates the terrorists and flies away.

Miracleman returns home to a startled Liz and attempts to explain his newly-remembered backstory. Liz is initially skeptical and laughs at him but eventually convinced, and they spend the night together.

Miracleman's appearance is noticed by Johnny Bates, who has become a successful international businessman in the intervening decades. Bates invites Mike and Liz to his offices, and though they are initially convinced by his story Mike confronts Bates with his suspicions that he has become corrupted by his powers. These suspicions are confirmed when Kid Miracleman attacks. Transforming into Miracleman, Moran attempts to fight Kid Miracleman but is overpowered and only spared by Bates mistakenly speaking his 'magic word' and transforming back into a young boy. Miracleman and Liz escape, leaving Bates in the hands of the authorities.

As a result of their single night together, Liz becomes pregnant with Miracleman's child, an event that fuels Mike Moran's feelings of inadequacy in comparison to his superhuman alter-ego.

The 'Spookshow', a government agency, recruits Evelyn Cream to kill Moran. Cream instead kidnaps Moran and they agree to work together to discover Miracleman's real origins. This leads them to a hidden bunker in the countryside where Miracleman encounters various ineffectual traps and a deranged superhuman called Big Ben, who he subdues effortlessly.

Once inside the bunker, Miracleman learns that he is the result of an experimental program by the British government to create superhumans as an escalation of the Cold War arms race. The program is derived from alien technology discovered in the 1950s and overseen by Emil Gargunza, an ex-Nazi scientist given shelter by the British government. Miracleman's supposed past was a virtual reality fiction created to subdue him and the rest of the Miracleman Family and make them pliable as super-weapons. Enraged by this, Miracleman destroys much of the bunker and, once calmed by Cream, returns home.

===== Book Two: 'The Red King Syndrome' – written by Alan Moore =====
As the birth of her and Miracleman's child grows near Liz is kidnapped by Gargunza, now living in Paraguay, where Liz is taken. Whilst she is held captive Gargunza relates to her his life story, telling of how he worked on the Zarathustra Project, adapting the technology of a crashed spaceship and creating the Miracleman Family. He hopes to transfer his consciousness into the body of Miracleman's child, thus achieving immortality.

Miracleman and Cream travel to Paraguay and confront Gargunza. However, Gargunza has implanted another 'magic word' which changes Miracleman back into a defenceless Mike Moran for an hour. He then sets his 'Miracledog' – a monstrous, genetically altered super-animal – on Moran and Cream. Cream is killed and Moran is maimed but he remembers the 'magic word' Gargunza used on the dog and it reverts back to its harmless original form, whereupon Moran kills it and evades Gargunza's mercenaries until such time as he can change back to Miracleman. When he does, he slaughters Gargunza's guards, kills Gargunza and rescues Liz who then gives birth to a daughter, Winter – who can already speak.

Back in England, domestic tensions between Mike and Liz are exacerbated by Liz's mood swings – which she suspects are caused by Winter, who is developing at an unusually accelerated rate. Meanwhile two alien agents are tracking Moran, but are themselves being followed by a mystery woman.

===== Book Three: 'Olympus' – written by Alan Moore =====
The alien Qys attack Moran, who becomes Miracleman and attempts to fight them off, but the aliens are able to change bodies in a manner similar to Moran / Miracleman himself and easily defeat him. Upon learning of Winter's existence, they turn their attention to Liz but are thwarted by the mystery woman, who reveals herself to be Avril Lear – Miraclewoman – and reveals herself to be another of Gargunza's experiments.

The Qys take Miracleman and Miraclewoman to their homeworld where the future of the Miracleman Family – and Earth itself – is discussed by the ambassadors of the Qys and their mortal enemies the Warpsmiths. Miraclewoman convinces the assembly that Earth should be a neutral world wherein the two cultures can work together and hopefully achieve some form of understanding.

After returning to Earth, Miracleman finds himself growing apart from his human ties as Liz leaves him and Winter (who is physically a small child but already beyond even Miracleman himself in terms of mental development) leaves Earth to find and learn from the Qys.

Mike Moran, his life turned upside down, commits a form of suicide by trekking into the wilderness and leaving a small memorial for himself to find when he transforms for a last time into Miracleman. Miracleman understands this gesture and never returns to his human form again.

With the help of Qys and Warpsmith agents including Aza Chorn, the initial alien/superhuman project is to gather together all the remaining superhumans on Earth and work in secret to begin to nudge Earth towards a more enlightened path. This is cut short, however, by the sudden re-emergence of Kid Miracleman. Johnny Bates, who has been kept at a children's home in England, has been attempting to keep his alter-ego at bay; but the brutal abuse he suffers at the hands of fellow inmates forces him to transform into a vengeful Kid Miracleman, who destroys half of London in Miracleman's temporary absence and kills forty thousand people until he is stopped by Aza Chorn and killed by Miracleman.

Miracleman and Miraclewoman reshape the world into a utopia. All the practical ills of human society are cured, and the offer of superhuman powers and children is gradually taken up by a humanity who regard the Miracleman Family as gods. The pantheon of new gods build Olympus, a temple in the ruins of Central London where they are worshipped by human acolytes. Despite having created a utopia, Miracleman is haunted by Liz's accusation that he has lost touch with his humanity.

===== Books Four and Five: 'The Golden Age' & 'The Silver Age' – written by Neil Gaiman with Mark Buckingham =====
After a series of short stories detailing the effects of this new society on ordinary humans and supporting characters from the series ['The Golden Age'], the main story picks up again in the year 2001 ['The Silver Age'], where Young Miracleman – Dickie Dauntless – is revived but has a great deal of trouble adjusting to the new world he finds himself in.

Miraclewoman convinces Miracleman that Dauntless is infatuated with him, and Miracleman attempts to kiss him to assuage his frustrations. This shocks and enrages Dauntless, whose attitudes towards sexuality and the world in general are still very much those of the 1950s. He leaves Olympus to discover himself in the changed world of 2001. Landing in the Himalaya mountains, a bewildered Dauntless ends up meeting Bill Caxton (Mister Master), the first superhuman created by Miracleman and also the only to ever give up his powers. Inspired by this experience, and accompanied by the somewhat directionless but enhanced Meta-Maid, Dauntless finds the orphanage where he grew up prior to being abducted by Gargunza. In an extended flashback, Dauntless remembers the physical and mental abuse he experienced before changing back to his Young Miracleman form and vowing to confront Miracleman.

In the finale of this series, Miracleman meets Young Miracleman who after rebuking his options and criticising this present world states "I'm going to be your adversary. Not now. But One Day. I'm going to be the opposition. If this is Eden, I'm going to be the Serpent.". Ultimately agreeing to these terms, Miracleman lets Young Miracleman leave where he starts meditating for prolonged periods and begins a social movement. Under Miraclewoman's encouragement, Miracleman unofficially cedes Australia for Young Miracleman. In the final panels of the series, Young Miracleman hears the voice from Kid Miracleman from infra-space asking to be let out.

The series was to be concluded in Book 6, The Dark Age, but is currently shelved in the wake of sexual misconduct allegations against Gaiman.

== Powers and abilities ==
Miracleman can fly, has super-strength and is invulnerable. The source of his strength and durability is a forcefield, derived from Qys technology. He is able to tear open a bunker door without apparent effort, push his finger through a human chest without any sort of run-up, and clapping his hands together causes a concussive blast that deafens those within range. Miracleman survives being in the range of the Operation Dragonslayer nuclear bomb unscathed, only being forced into dormancy by the physical and mental damage done to Mike Moran, and is impervious to bullets, blades, rocket launchers and conventional explosives. He can survive without oxygen, and is able to singlehandedly carve Silence from subsea rock. Liz finds his speed cannot be measured by a stopwatch, estimating it as well over Mach 2. In the original, the character could fly around Earth fast enough to move backwards or forwards in time, an ability that has yet to be featured in the revival.

== Reception ==
=== Critical reception ===
Timothy Adams of ComicBook.com called Miracleman a "classic superhero." Michael Doran of Newsarama included Miracleman in their "Best Marvel characters left to adapt to the MCU" list. Danilo Raul of MovieWeb ranked Miracleman 7th in their "Obscure Marvel Characters That Deserve Their Own Films" list.

== Other versions ==
An alternate version of Miracleman is one of the heroes of Earth-238 that appears in the Captain Britain stories written by Moore and Alan Davis around the time of their work together on Marvelman for Warrior. A grave bearing the name is seen by Captain Britain shortly before he is killed by the Fury on the alternate world; the character's death at the hands of the symbiote was then shown in flashback during a nightmare experienced by Linda McQuillan (the superhero Captain UK). Moore would later recall that they came up for the name for the Marvel appearances but it features in his original proposal for the Warrior strip as an alternate title, but it was the first use of the name in print. When asked, Moore could not recall if he remembered using it when settling on renaming Marvelman for Eclipse Comics.
