= Young Miracleman =

Comic book character

- Young Miracleman on the cover of Miracleman by Gaiman & Buckingham: The Silver Age #3, by David Aja

Character information
- First appearance: Young Marvelman #25 (1954)
- Created by: Mick Anglo

In-story information
- Alter ego: Richard "Dicky" Dauntless
- Species: Human
- Team affiliations: Miracleman Family (1954–1963) (Note: Since licensing the characters from Mick Anglo in 2009, Marvel Comics have used the Young Marvelman name for original 1954–1963 appearances and Young Miracleman for revival material.)
- Partnerships: Miracleman; Kid Miracleman
- Abilities: Flight, strength, & durability via forcefield

Publication information
- Publisher: L. Miller & Son, Ltd. (1954–1963); Quality Communications (1982–1985); Eclipse Comics (1985–1993); Marvel Comics (2010–present)
- Genre: Superhero
- Publication date: February 1954

Young Miracleman (originally Young Marvelman) is a fictional British Golden Age comic book superhero, originally created by Mick Anglo for publisher L. Miller & Son in 1954, and debuting in Young Marvelman #25, dated 3 February of that year as a replacement for Fawcett Publications' Captain Marvel Jr., whose civilian name is Richard "Dicky" Dauntless. A comic based on his adventures ran for 345 issues until 1963.

The character was subsequently revived in 1982 by Alan Moore as a supporting character in Marvelman. The series was continued from 1985 as Miracleman, with the character renamed Young Miracleman as a result.

== Creation ==
Young Marvelman was created by Mick Anglo in 1954 on request from Len Miller of L. Miller & Son, Ltd. The publisher had been producing comics starring Captain Marvel Jr., but the supply of material was cut short when Fawcett Publications cancelled the title in response to legal action from DC Comics. Anglo thus converted the character into Young Marvelman as a junior counterpart to Marvelman, the similarly reinvented Captain Marvel. Freddie Freeman became the similarly alliterative Dicky Dauntless; however Dauntless did not retain Freeman's injuries and was instead a messenger boy. For the character's costume Anglo effectively exchanged Captain Marvel and Captain Marvel Jr's colour schemes and made both blond, eliminating the character's cloaks to simplify drawing the heroes. Young Marvelman did however retain Junior's distinctive kiss curl, and still changed form by calling the name of his mentor, now Marvelman. While both characters debuted at the same time, Young Marvelman's origin (revealed in Young Marvelman #64) established that Marvelman was already active in their fictional shared universe before Dauntless gained his powers.

The new character first appeared in Young Marvelman #25, and would continue to star in the series until it ended with #370. Along the way the character also starred in annuals, albums and a third series named Marvelman Family that featured solo adventures for both Young Marvelman and Marvelman, alongside a feature strip where they would both team up with a third character, Kid Marvelman. A Young Marvelman fan club was also run from the pages of the magazine.

Due to Anglo twice revisiting the Captain Marvel template for other works, two later versions of the character as a younger sidekick exist – Miracle Jr, based on redrawn Young Marvelman material, was an ally of Captain Miracle., while Miracle Man would gain the juvenile partner Miracle Boy, later known as Supercoat

In the revival, the character is killed before the events of the main narrative and throughout Moore's run only appears in dream sequences, flashbacks and occasionally post-mortem. This did include a 6-page solo strip by Moore and artist John Ridgway, set in 1957. In his proposal for the strip, Moore toyed with renaming Dauntless as Richard Dawson but instead retained the original name. Moore's successor Neil Gaiman resurrected Young Miracleman at the conclusion of his first story arc, "The Golden Age". Young Miracleman joined the main cast as one of the lead characters for the second, The Silver Age, with editor Valerie Jones noting to Amazing Heroes that the character allowed "a further exploration of the morality of Miracleman's decisions, embodied in a distraught person from his past, one who cannot adjust to the utopia different from his last memory". However Eclipse went bankrupt two issues into the storyline, and Miracleman went into a long hiatus while legal issues surrounding the characters were resolved. After this was clarified, Mick Anglo-era Young Marvelman strips were printed by Marvel Comics in the Marvelman: Family's Finest limited series in 2010 and the short-lived Young Marvelman Classic archive volumes. Following further legal clarification, Marvel began reprinting the revival material in 2014, using the Young Miracleman name for the character.

After several delays, Gaiman and Buckingham were finally able to continue the long-awaited Silver Age storyline in 2022. Logan Dalton compared Young Miracleman to "one of the kids from Chronicles of Narnia" due to his dated attitudes while reviewing the first issue of the series. Writing for Bleeding Cool, Rich Johnston expressed excitement that after 30 years the meaning of scenes featuring Young Miracleman from Miracleman #24 might be clarified. Boing Boing also noted the high level of anticipation the continuation of the story had received. Both Jamie Lovett of ComicBook.com and Matthew Peterson of Major Spoilers noted the metafictional storytelling allowed by the Young Miracleman character.

== Fictional character biography ==
=== Original ===
Teenager Dicky Dauntless is a Bullaho-based messenger boy working for the Transatlantic Messenger Service. Taking a break at the Indian Springs Wishing Well he comes across his hero Marvelman, who is exhausted from his busy crimefighting career. Eager to help, Dicky offers to deliver a warning to the industrialist Hiram Steele, who has been targeted by the rival Strong Steps Corporation. When he arrives Steele is already under attack from SSC goons but Dauntless is able to keep them busy until Marvelman arrives. Unable to spare the time to protect Steele due to being needed elsewhere and impressed by Dicky's bravery, Marvelman calls up astro-scientist Guntag Borghelm, who gives Dicky a concoction. After drinking it, calling "Marvelman" allows him to transform into the superpowered Young Marvelman. Often his delivery work allowed Dicky to stumble across nefarious activities which he would foil after summoning up his alter ego, though sometimes he responded to events reported in the Daily Bugle newspaper (where Marvelman's alter ego Micky Moran worked as a copyboy) or brought to his attention by radio.

He then embarks on a long and successful crimefighting career of his own, battling both earthly threats such as the mad scientist Young Gargunza, nephew of Marvelman's archenemy Dr. Gargunza and alien menaces including Young Nastyman, a youth named Pontag from the planet Victo who could gain superpowers due to an elixir given to him by the hermit Nastyman, and later returning on further occasions. On one occasion both Young Gargunza and Young Nastyman worked together, and Young Marvelman was still able to emerge victorious.

Other adventures saw The Mightiest Boy in the Universe prevent millionaire Hiram Z. Batz from stealing the world's monuments; save the Sultan of Khazistan from assassination; stop the elven Zugs from poisoning the waters of Luxenheim Health Spa; imprison a ring of criminals fixing baseball and hockey games with drugged hot dogs; liberate Prince Plar of Plax to prevent the Plaxians from invading Earth under the hawkish Zora; recovering a bottomless jug of milk; break up a gang of kidnapping Argentine gauchos; rescue explorers from bandits in Kurdistan; retrieve a stolen magic carpet from Mahrud the Unwashed in Damascus; dispose of a large amount of nuclear bombs when Senor Crepi attempts to steal them from America; aiding the police in capturing on-the-lam gangster Big Spud; deal with the dervish Abu Halfa when he attempted to convince the people of Sudan he was the Mahdi; recapture escaped prisoners for the Foreign Legion in colonial Ligeria; coercing his TMS boss Mr. Snarl into reinstating Dauntless and his chums by forcing him to run a gang of Mexican bandits and using his subsequent crimes as leverage; free explorer Foster Thorne from slavers; prevent foreign agent Varsoff from kidnapping atomic genius Professor Nuklear; transport a preserved woolly mammoth found near the North Pole; defeating Dr. Nitro's giant ants; track down the Jawal Rifles' missing goat mascot Pogo; defeating the plotting lesser Olympian gods Hiatus and Pathygus; foil attempts by foreign agents to steal the new X1000 rocket; dealing with unscrupulous Canadian loggers]; travel back in time to free a sheriff from the Buller Gang and serve in the Pacific theater of World War II; return a vast collection of ships accrued by modern-day pirates; dream he was a Chinese boy enslaved by Mongols; locate survivors of a plane crash in the Brazilian jungle; prevent disaster from ruining a sacred city in Tibet; bail out a girl who thought she could be an astronaut; turn back an invasion by subterraneans; recover genetically modified hybrid creatures intended as a response to public outcry over the use of animals in the Sputnik programme; extract United States Secret Service agent Daniela Lanhart from Boromonia; clear up a misunderstanding that nearly led to an attack on Earth by the people of Udos; halt attempts by a faction of Bruto inhabitants to invade Earth; battle the murderous Nuclear Gnomes created by scientist Silas A. Woodkarver; uncover a plot by Nazi holdout Karl Heilig to salvage a German atom bomb from the wreck of the battleship Blitzkrieg; and defeat the huge Mongolian bandit Manola Khan.

At times he would work with both Marvelman and new ally Kid Marvelman to stop evils such as Garrer and his army of time-travelling renegades.; a combined alliance of Marvelman's arch-enemy Doctor Gargunza and his nephew, Young Marvelman rogue Young Gargunza; the King of Vegetableland; invaders from the planet Vardica; would-be dictator Professor Batts and his speech-scramber; a crime boss intent on sinking Pacific City below the ocean; the cruel, slave-driving King Snop of Atlantis (which the story revealed would eventually become Australia); an attempt by Gargunza to declare himself King of the Universe; cruel 14th century knight Simon de Carton (clearing the name of Amadis of Gaul in the process); a monster accidentally collected from the planet Droon; and Professor Wosmine's shrinking ray.

=== Revival ===
Richard "Dicky" Dauntless was the orphaned son of an RAF major. He was thus identified by Emil Gargunza and Sir Dennis Archer as a suitable candidate for Project Zarathustra, intelligence agency Spookshow's plan to create superhumans as a Cold War weapon. Dauntless was abducted and drugged before being cloned with Qys technology, a process that had recently been used on fellow kidnapped orphan Micky Moran. As such Young Miracleman was created as a superpowered duplicate of Dauntless and placed in infra-space, with the two bodies switching places when the change-word "Miracleman" was spoken. Dauntless was kept immersed in a complex series of dreams by Gargunza, which were actually a combination of training exercises and devices to keep the powerful superhumans under control., inspired by reading a Captain Marvel comic Miracleman and Young Miracleman were then joined by a third superhero, Kid Miracleman – actually another abducted orphan, Johnny Bates.

After the program was cancelled and Gargunza absconded with most of the research. Archer decided the Miracleman Family posed too much of a danger. In 1963 the trio were released into the world and lured into Earth's atmosphere, with their conditioning making them think they were investigating a device created by a fictional analogue of Gargunza, an archenemy from the artificial reality. In fact it was a nuclear device, which detonated when the Miracleman Family drew close. Young Miracleman was destroyed by the device and, as he instinctively called out for Miracleman, so was Dauntless. His disfigured human corpse remained in infraspace, where the Qys referred to it as "the exploded thing". When Spookshow recovered Young Nastyman's skeleton from Iceland, they misidentified it as the remains of Young Miracleman and stored it in the Project Zarathrusta bunker.

The next forty years revealed that both Miracleman and Kid Miracleman had survived the incident. With help from his consort Miraclewoman and the alien Qys and Warpsmith races, Miracleman defeats Kid Miracleman in a brutal battle in London and takes benevolent control of Earth. The planet became an advanced utopia and with the aid of Qys technology a probe was able to take cell samples from Dauntless' corpse in infraspace and build new bodies for him.

He awakens in 2003, where Miracleman tells him of his true origin and of Kid Miracleman's rampage, which Dauntless – who has retained the attitudes of 1950s British society – attempts to take on the chin but is devastated by. Young Miracleman is hailed as a legend, treatment he reacts to with polite bemusement. He keeps a schedule of appearances which largely involve flying down streets of major cities and making speeches to rapturous crowds. Meanwhile Miraclewoman, having long believed Young Miracleman has homosexual feelings for Miracleman, persuades the latter to make the newcomer feel loved by attempting to seduce him. However, when Miracleman attempts to kiss him, Young Miracleman reacts with distress, punches him and flees Olympus. He travels to the Himalayas, where he meets Jason Oakey and others making a pilgrimage to meet augmented hermit Caxton.

== Powers and abilities ==
Young Miracleman can fly, has super-strength and is invulnerable thanks to the Qys technology used to create him. While he is destroyed by the Operation Dragonslayer payload this is partially due to being nearer than Miracleman and Kid Miracleman while also instinctively calling out to Miracleman, triggering his change. Despite his relative lack of experience upon his resurrection he is still capable of punching Miracleman through a wall.

== Other versions ==
An alternate version of Young Marvelman, referred to only as Rick, is one of the heroes of Earth-238 that appears in the Captain Britain stories written by Moore and Alan Davis around the time of their work together on Marvelman. He is the lover of Linda McQuillan (the superhero Captain UK) and ensures her escape to Earth-616 during the events of when the Fury massacres the heroes of their world. Rick is seemingly killed himself after Captain UK escapes. However he is later resurrected by the sorceress Roma as a gesture of gratitude for Linda's heroism.
