= Marvelman Family =

Comic book series

- The cover of Marvelman Family #13.

Character information
- Created by: Mick Anglo

Publication information
- Publisher: L. Miller & Son, Ltd.
- Schedule: Monthly
- Genre: Superhero
- Publication date: October 1956 – November 1959
- Number of issues: 30; 1 annual
- Main character(s): Marvelman; Young Marvelman; Kid Marvelman

Creative team
- Writer(s): Mick Anglo
- Artist(s): Don Lawrence; Norman Light

Marvelman Family was a British Silver Age superhero comic book, featuring eponymous team consisting of the characters Marvelman, Young Marvelman and Kid Marvelman. The title was created in 1956 by Mick Anglo for publisher L. Miller & Son as a companion title for the company's Marvelman and Young Marvelman magazines.

In 1982 the characters were revived in the comics anthology Warrior strip Marvelman, and renamed the Miracleman Family in 1985. Since 2009 the rights to the character have been licensed to Marvel Comics, who have reprinted some of the L. Miller & Sons material.

== Creation ==
After being forced to create Marvelman and Young Marvelman as replacements for Captain Marvel and Captain Marvel Jr. respectively as a result of DC Comics' legal action against Fawcett Publications in 1954, publisher L. Miller & Son had seen their superhero sales go from strength to strength, with both characters running in successful weekly comics and growing fan clubs. In order to further exploit the success Miller added a third monthly title to their portfolio, under the name Marvelman Family. Mick Anglo's Gower Street Studios were again engaged to provide the contents for the new title, with Don Lawrence eventually providing most of the artwork for the title but leaving shortly before its cancellation after a disagreement with Anglo.

Marvelman and Young Marvelman were joined in the lead strip of Marvelman Family by a third superpowered character. While the Marvel Family the characters were based on had featured the female Mary Marvel as a third member, the new addition was another male in the form of Kid Marvelman - recently introduced in Marvelman #102, ahead of a stint as a back-up feature in that magazine building up to the publication of Marvelman Family. Both Alan Moore and Denis Gifford would later speculate that this was due to the book's target audience of young boys being uninterested in a female character.

== Publishing history ==
Unlike Marvelman and Young Marvelman, Marvelman Family was a monthly title. However, it used the same dimensions as its weekly relatives - and was actually a penny cheaper at 6d an issue. Despite being monthly no editions were released in December or January for the three years it was published, meaning a total of 30 issues over 36 months.

Marvelman Family was short-lived compared to its companion titles, as by 1959 the ban on imported American comics that had allowed Miller's publications to prosper was lifted, while the title faced increased competition from the anthology-style weekly comics of rivals Fleetway Publications and DC Thomson. With sales falling, the November 1959 issue was the title's last. While Marvelman and Young Marvelman would continue to have adventures in their respective comics, the cancellation of Marvelman Family effectively ended Kid Marvelman's adventures until the 1982 revival. While the Marvelman Family name was briefly revived for a 1961 annual the team was only featured in a single story, a reprint from one of the monthly comics.

== Content ==
Each issue featured three strips - one starring all three characters and one solo strip apiece for Marvelman and Young Marvelman. No clear rationale was provided for why Marvelman would decide to round up his younger comrades for particular crises and not for his adventures in his own weekly comic. Among the threats the Family battled against were Garrer and his army of time-travelling renegades, a combined alliance of Marvelman's arch-enemy Doctor Gargunza and his nephew, Young Marvelman rogue Young Gargunza, the King of Vegetableland invaders from the planet Vardica, would-be dictator Professor Batts and his speech-scramber, a crime boss intent on sinking Pacific City below the ocean, the cruel, slave-driving King Snop of Atlantis (which the story revealed would eventually become Australia), an attempt by Gargunza to declare himself King of the Universe, cruel 14th century knight Simon de Carton (and clearing the name of Amadis of Gaul in the process), a monster accidentally collected from the planet Droon and Professor Wosmine's shrinking ray

== Legacy ==
=== Revival ===
All three characters were revived in 1982 for the Warrior strip Marvelman, written by Alan Moore and published by Quality Communications. The trio's original adventures were retconned as dreams induced by scientist Emil Gargunza, with the term "Marvelman Family" being used to refer to the three superhumans created by RAF intelligence agency Spook Show as Cold War weapons. The name was also revived for a flashback strip in Warrior #17. Quality Communications also published a Marvelman Special in 1984, containing vintage reprints with a framing sequence by Moore and Alan Davis to make it fit with the revised premise. "Marvelman Family and the Invaders from the Future", originally printed in the first issue of Marvelman Family, was one of the stories featured.

The revival was continued by American publisher Eclipse Comics from 1985. Due to objections from Marvel Comics, the title and the character were renamed as Miracleman, with the supporting cast updated accordingly - with the Marvelman Family becoming the Miracleman Family.

=== Reprints ===
In addition to the Quality Marvelman Special, several other Anglo-era strips were also reprinted in connection with the revival by Eclipse. "Marvelman Family and the Invaders from the Future" was edited and used as a prelude to the updated of the Moore version of the character. The 1988 mini-series Miracleman Family was inspired by the title's name, and contained updated versions of "Marvelman Family and the Shadow Stealers" and "Marvelman Family and the Hollow Planet". For all of these reprints the names were updated in line with those now used in the main series, and the strips were colourised.

Following the resolution of the protracted ownership debate, Marvel Comics struck a deal with Anglo to license the character shortly after the legal ownership was confirmed in 2009. This allowed the character to return to the Marvelman name, which would be used for reprints of the Anglo-era material (with Miracleman retained for material produced from 1982 onwards), overseen by archivist Derek Wilson. They issued the six-issue mini-series Marvelman - Family's Finest, reprinting a selection of stories from Marvelman, Young Marvelman and Marvelman Family, with new covers contributed by the likes of Marko Djurdjević, Doug Braithwaite, Mike Perkins, Jae Lee and Khoi Pham - as well as one by Anglo himself..

== Collected editions ==
Title	ISBN	Release date	Contents
Marvelman: Family's Finest	9780785149699	March 2011	Contains material from Marvelman #65, #72-77, #102, #105-106, #108, #159, #222, #228, #235 & #252; Young Marvelman #57, #72, #88, #100, #200 & #202; and Marvelman Family #3, #8-10, #14, #18 & #29-30.
