= Young Marvelman =

Comic book series

- Young Marvelman on the cover of Young Marvelman #48.

Character information
- First appearance: Young Marvelman #25 (1954)
- Created by: Mick Anglo

In-story information
- Alter ego: Dicky Dauntless
- Place of origin: Earth
- Partnerships: Marvelman; Kid Marvelman
- Abilities: Flight, strength, durability.

Publication information
- Publisher: L. Miller & Son, Ltd.
- Schedule: Weekly (1953-1960); Monthly (1960-1963)
- Genre: Superhero
- Publication date: February 1954 – February 1963
- Number of issues: 347; 9 annuals

Creative team
- Writer(s): Mick Anglo
- Artist(s): Mick Anglo; James Bleach; Roy Parker; George Parlett; Leo Rawlings; Frank Daniels; Charles Baker; Stanley White; John Whitlock

Young Marvelman was a British Golden Age superhero comic book, published by L. Miller & Son in the United Kingdom between 1954 and 1963. The lead character was originally created in 1954 by Mick Anglo as a replacement for Captain Marvel Jr due to Fawcett Publications ending the latter's titles following legal action by DC Comics.

In 1982 the character was revived in the comics anthology Warrior, and later renamed Young Miracleman in 1985. Since 2009, the rights to the character have been licensed from Anglo by Marvel Comics, who have reprinted some of the vintage material under the original Young Marvelman name.

== Creation ==
With the British economy struggling to recover from World War II, a ban on importing American comics was enacted, leading to a boom in indigenous comics. However, a loophole existed whereby a British publisher could import overseas comics, print them and sell the results. This proved to be a lucrative move for L. Miller & Son, especially when they licensed Captain Marvel and Captain Marvel Jr. from Fawcett Publications. However, after losing a landmark legal case against National Comics in 1952, Fawcett discontinued their superhero material, cutting off the supply of strips for L. Miller & Son. Not wanting to cancel the highly profitable titles, Len Miller contacted artist Mick Anglo, whose Gower Street Studios had already created cover art for many L. Miller & Son comics. Anglo devised the characters of Marvelman and Young Marvelman to replace them, featuring a similar premise of young men who could change into powerful superheroes.

== Publishing history ==
=== Transition ===
L. Miller & Son's Captain Marvel Jr #24 featured the title "Captain Marvel Jr - The Young Marvelman" on the front cover; inside the editorial revealed that Freddy Freeman had decided to retire and lead a normal life, with his place being taken by Dicky Dauntless as Young Marvelman. Thus Young Marvelman took over the numbering of the Captain Marvel series, leading to the character debuting on 3 February 1954 in Young Marvelman #25. A similar transition took place in sister title Captain Marvel, which soon became Marvelman.

=== Content ===
Like its predecessor, Young Marvelman was a weekly comic. In order to cut expenditure in resizing or modifying artwork from American publishers, L. Miller & Son retained the same dimensions as US comic books. Each issue was 28 pages long, and the interiors were printed in black and white on newsprint, with only the covers in colour. Issues typically contained two 8-page Young Marvelman tales and a third back-up feature from the inventory. In addition there were humour strips and, bookending the contents, a letter from the unnamed editor (penned by Anglo) featuring a preview for the next issue and a 'Young Marvelman News' page, other fragments of news and plugs for other L. Miller & Son books. It was priced at 7d, and would stay that way until the title's demise. Back-up features were either produced by Gower Street Studios or were from other series licensed by Miller, including Tom Moore's Billy Brig and the Pirates and Spanish science fiction hero Johnny Galaxia. In-house humour strips such as Young Joey, The Friendly Soul and Flip and Flop were also used to fill single or half pages.

Young Marvelman was similar to Captain Marvel Jr: a young messenger boy working for the Transatlantic Messenger Service (TMS) named Dicky Dauntless encounters an astrophysicist called Guntag Borghelm, instead of a wizard called Shazam, who gives him superpowers based on atomic energy instead of magic. To transform into Young Marvelman, he speaks the word "Marvelman", the hero having arranged for Dauntless to receive his powers from Borghelm. Like his hero, when surprised Dauntless would cry "Holy Macaroni!". The character's origin was initially only relayed in a text box accompanying the first frame of each adventure, before later being told in the strip "How Dicky Dauntless became Young Marvelman" in Young Marvelman #64. While Young Marvelman had debuted at the same time as Marvelman, his origin story would establish that the latter predated Young Marvelman in-fiction.

Anglo initially handled the strip himself while it was shaped before involving other artists from his studio. The British comic industry of the time did not keep exhaustive records of creators - with the strips themselves bearing no credits - but among the Gower Street Studios artists identified as working on Marvelman, Young Marvelman and/or Marvelman Family were Don Lawrence, Ron Embleton, George Stokes and Denis Gifford, who would all go on to have successful careers in the industry. To keep the work on schedule Anglo adopted a system broadly similar to the "Marvel method" later used by Stan Lee - to avoid complicated scripts with overdetailed panel descriptions he would devise a plot outline, pass it to one of the studio's artists and then write dialogue and narration to fit the resulting pages of art. Anglo handed work on Young Marvelman over to the other Gower Street Studios at an earlier point than he did for Marvelman; James Bleach, George Parlett, Frank Daniels and Leo Rawlings were among those to work on early issues.

Writing in 1977 for his book Nostalgia: Spotlight on the Fifties, Anglo would evaluate the work of several of those who worked on Young Marvelman, praising Roy Parker, Parlett, Rawlings, Charles Baker and Mike Whitlock but noted a "quaintness" in the work of Stanley White.

Based in Bullahoo City in America, Young Marvelman's adventures saw him come across various evil-doings either through his work for TMS or reading about them in the Daily Bugle, the newspaper Marvelman's alter ego Micky Moran worked for. Like his mentor, Young Marvelman was also capable of time travel thanks to his ability to fly around the world faster than the speed of light, visiting periods of history that included the Old West and - often, in response to reader request - World War II

The title also had two notable recurring villains. One was an alien teen named Pontag from the planet Victo, who received an elixir from a hermit called Nastyman that allowed him to transform into the superhuman Young Nastyman, first appearing in Young Marvelman #57, and later returning on further occasions The other was Young Gargunza, the evil nephew of Marvelman adversary Doctor Gargunza with a very strong family resemblance and a similar penchant for world-dominating schemes; the character debuted in Young Marvelman #100 and also would reappear. Later both villains teamed up to battle Young Marvelman in Young Marvelman #200.

=== Success ===
Young Marvelman was a success, exceeding the sales of Captain Marvel Jr, and led to several spin-offs. A fan club called simply the Young Marvelman Club was initiated, with members receiving a pin badge, a key to decipher coded messages printed in the comic's editorial pages and, later, birthday cards in exchange for a Shilling. Young Marvelman annuals were also produced by L. Miller & Son; these 96-page hardback books featured a mix of strip adventures (some of which featured coloured art, the only material from the original run to do so), illustrated text stories and activity pages. Two "Magic Painting" books were also produced - these featured pages pre-coated with watercolour paint, which would be revealed when a wet paintbrush was applied. By popular demand a third title was added to the range in October 1956, Marvelman Family, a monthly that featured Marvelman and Young Marvelman teaming up with Kid Marvelman, which would run for 30 issues.

=== Overseas ===
The character was exported to several other countries. Young's Merchandising Company of Sydney reprinted the titles for the Australian and New Zealand markets while oversized editions were released in both magazine and album formats in Italy.

=== Decline and cancellation ===
British sales however began to fall after the ban on importing American comics was lifted in November 1959. In 1960 they had dropped to a degree where L. Miller & Son switched the title to a monthly status and the contents to reprints, while the annuals would shrink in size and quality. As a result Mick Anglo left the title, turning down an offer from Arnold Miller and instead setting up his own Anglo Features, using material created for Young Marvelman for the short-lived Captain Miracle as the adventures of Miracle Junior. Original cover-art was still created, though while Captain Marvel Jr's cape even made a reappearance one cover, while another would be inexplicably rename the character as Marvelman Junior on the front only. Even this wasn't enough to keep the comic profitable and with the publisher in dire financial straits the final issues of Marvelman and Young Marvelman - #370 of each - were dated February 1963. The annuals would also end publication the same year.

== Ownership ==
L. Miller & Son would stop publishing comics in 1963, and would stay in existence until 1974. The company's asbestos comic printing plate masters were purchased by Alan Class Comics, who would only reprint a handful of horror and science fiction strips from the L. Miller & Son library. At the time it was industry standard that British comic characters were created on a work for hire basis, with the works belonging to the publisher, and the characters spent over a decade in publishing limbo on this false premise. However in 2009 it emerged that Anglo, whose name appeared next to a copyright symbol in some material, had actually retained the rights to the character all along.

== Legacy ==
=== Revival ===
Quality Communications founder and publisher Dez Skinn remembered the Marvelman character fondly and enlisted writer Alan Moore to revive him for the new anthology comic Warrior, believing the character to be in the public domain. Moore's original proposal for the revived Young Marvelman renamed his human form as Richard Dawson; however the Dicky Dauntless name was eventually kept in place. The revived strip debuted in the first issue of Warrior, with the revisionist storyline retconning the 1954-1963 material as simulations experienced by the characters. While Young Marvelman was part of the revived strip, the character was dead in the series' present and only appeared in flashbacks - including a one-off dialogue-free story written by Moore and drawn by John Ridgway, published in Warrior #12. A one-off Marvelman Special was produced by Quality in 1984, reprinting four Anglo-era strips with a new framing sequence by Moore and artist Alan Davis; "Young Marvelman and the Moon of Doom" was one of the stories present. However, soon after a variety of factors saw the strip stall, and Warrior ended in January 1985.

The revival was continued by American publisher Eclipse Comics from 1985. Due to objections from Marvel Comics, the title and the character were renamed as Miracleman, with the supporting cast updated accordingly - as such, Young Marvelman was renamed Young Miracleman, and was finally returned to life in Miracleman #23.

=== Reprints ===
In addition to the Quality Marvelman Special, several other Anglo-era strips were also reprinted in connection with the revival by Eclipse. Some of the special's material was released in stereoscopy as Miracleman 3D #1, including the Young Marvelman story. Two Young Marvelman episodes were also printed as backup strips in Miracleman #13, with two more printed in the 1988 mini-series Miracleman Family. For all of these reprints the names were updated in line with those now used in the main series, and the strips were colourised.

Following the resolution of the protracted ownership debate, Marvel Comics struck a deal with Anglo to license the character shortly after the legal ownership was confirmed in 2009. This allowed the character to return to the Young Marvelman name, which would be used for reprints of the Anglo-era material (with Young Miracleman retained for material produced from 1982 onwards), remastering the original strips and presenting them in their original black-and-white - a process overseen by archivist Derek Wilson. In 2010 Marvel issued the six-issue mini-series Marvelman - Family's Finest, reprinting a selection of stories from Marvelman, Young Marvelman and Marvelman Family, with new covers contributed by the likes of Marko Djurdjević, Doug Braithwaite, Mike Perkins, Jae Lee and Khoi Pham - as well as one by Anglo himself. A series of hardback archives of Young Marvelman Classic began in 2011; however, these were not a financial success and no further volumes have been issued since 2012.

== Collected editions ==
Title	ISBN	Release date	Contents
Marvelman: Family's Finest	9780785149699	March 2011	Contains material from Marvelman #65, #72-77, #102, #105-106, #108, #159, #222, #228, #235 & #252; Young Marvelman #57, #72, #88, #100, #200 & #202; and Marvelman Family #3, #8-10, #14, #18 & #29-30.
Young Marvelman Classic Vol. 1	9780785155041	May 2011	Contains material from Young Marvelman #25-34
Young Marvelman Classic Vol. 2	9780785158264	January 2012	Contains material from Young Marvelman #35-44
