= Miraclewoman =

Comic book character

- Miraclewoman on the cover of Miracleman #12, by John Totleben.

Character information
- First appearance: Miracleman #10 (1986)
- Created by: Alan Moore

In-story information
- Alter ego: Avril Lear
- Species: Human
- Place of origin: Earth
- Partnerships: Miracleman; Qys; Warpsmiths; Huey Moon
- Notable aliases: Doctor McCarthy
- Abilities: Flight, strength, & durability via forcefield

Publication information
- Publisher: Eclipse Comics (1986–1993); Marvel Comics (2010–present)
- Genre: Superhero
- Publication date: December 1986

Miraclewoman (Avril Lear) is a fictional comic book character originally created by Alan Moore for publisher Eclipse Comics in 1986 and debuting in Miracleman #10, dated December of that year.

== Creation ==
While Mick Anglo's Marvelman and Young Marvelman characters were based on Captain Marvel and Captain Marvel Jr. respectively, when the time came to add a third member to the line-up he devised Kid Marvelman, whereas Fawcett Publications had created Mary Marvel as the third member of the Marvel Family. Anglo's reasons for doing so were unclear, though both Moore and Denis Gifford would later speculate that this was to forestall any prejudice from the comic's predominantly young male readership against a female character.

When Moore revived the characters in 1982 as part of the Marvelman story in the anthology Warrior, Moore retained Kid Marvelman but also began planning to have a female character join the Anglo creations. Marvelwoman was mentioned in the chronology he and Steve Moore devised for the planned combined Warrior universe, being mentioned as marrying Marvelman in 1989 and bearing his son. The name "Lear" was first mentioned in Warrior #20, dated July 1984. Soon afterwards however the "Marvelman" strip disappeared from the magazine, which was cancelled soon afterwards. When the story returned it was under the aegis of Eclipse Comics and both it and its lead character were renamed Miracleman. The mention of Lear and Rebbeck was reprinted in Miracleman #6 in February 1986, leading to much speculation as to who it regarded in the title's letters page. In response a humorous note in the framing story of Miracleman #8, featuring artist Chuck Austen complaining that Moore wouldn't even tell him of their identity. Miracleman #10 in December 1986 saw Lear appear in her human form, with what would later be revealed as Miraclewoman's face and boots glimpsed without context before the superhuman version was finally revealed in Miracleman #11, published in May 1987.

== Fictional character biography ==
As part of his plan to create a superhuman baby to allow his mind to live forever, Gargunza decided to create Miraclewoman as a breeding partner for Miracleman. Without the knowledge of his Spookshow superiors he abducted the orphan Avril Lear as the template and successfully used the same recovered Qys technology to grow a superpowered clone of the girl, who was then subject to the same somatic induction and para-reality programming as her male counterparts. However, unlike them Miraclewoman was created at a secret facility, allowing Gargunza to indulge his base sexual desires without oversight from Sir Dennis Archer. As such he immediately began molesting Lear and repeatedly raped Miraclewoman as she slept. Meanwhile the fictional adventures she was subjected to were also more perverse, frequently revolving around bondage, torture and humiliation.

Alongside Miraclewoman, Gargunza also developed two other unsanctioned superbeings - the bestial Miracledog and Young Nastyman. As the latter, based on orphan Terence Rebbeck, was a villain he was also used in an increasingly degrading series of scenarios by the vicarious Gargunza. The scientist's lust eventually led to the continuity of the para-reality breaking down, causing Young Nastyman to awaken and escape, still believing himself to be a brutal supervillain. To avoid discovery, Gargunza awakened Miraclewoman, programming her to recruit the aid of the Miracleman Family to defeat the villain. During the meeting she became convinced that Young Miracleman was attracted to the oblivious Miracleman. However after leaving them, Miraclewoman discovered a bunker on Salisbury Plain that contained the truth of her origins. She was delighted to find she was more important and powerful than the para-reality had suggested, even finding Gargunza's abuse of her body laughable. Miraclewoman then tracked Young Nastyman to Iceland and attempted to take him with her. However he was beyond reason and attacked her, and after a battle was killed in a volcano. The fight convinced both the Miracleman Family and by extension Gargunza that Miraclewoman had perished. She used this opportunity to escape his clutches, taking in a new identity and using her human self to become general practitioner Doctor McCarthy. When the opportunity arises she still becomes Miraclewoman and greatly enjoys the possibilities the superhuman form allows her.

When Miracleman returns in 1982 she initially decides to remain undercover, but Miraclewoman is flushed out by the searches of a pair of Qys agents sent to investigate Earth's encroachment on infra-space. After evading them she goes to the Moran home and saves Liz and Winter from one of the envoys. Her frequent use of her superhuman body has left her more learned than Miracleman, and she readily accepts the Qys request for parlay, calmly recounting her life to Miracleman and Liz while the aliens make arrangements with the Warpsmiths. Even a journey to Qys itself does not faze her, and her frank, confident attitude helps negotiations. She joins Miracleman as a representative of the Qys on a station behind Earth's Moon to observe the planet's development along with the Warpsmiths Aza Chorn and Phon Mooda; the group are soon joined by the Firedrake Huey Moon.

In 1985 Kid Miracleman returns, killing 40,000 in London before the group notices and are transported to face him. After Aza Chorn warping the Bank of England onto Kid Miracleman fails to stop him, Miraclewoman is next to attack. Despite her experience, grade and skill she is brutally beaten by Kid Miracleman and plays no further role in the unfolding battle. Their presence public knowledge, the superhumans take control of Earth and reshape society as a utopia. Miraclewoman takes on a role analogous to Aphrodite, devising a computer matchmaking service so that everyone can find love and co-authoring a series of video sex education tutorials with Miracleman, with whom she makes love above England.

In the resulting golden age she becomes a hugely popular and influential figure, and comics featuring her outsell those of her male counterparts. Her sense of sexual liberation meant she had little compunction about sleeping with John Galloway in both her Miraclewoman and Avril Lear forms in order to teach him beauty is only skin deep. Whereas Miracleman occasionally frets over the transformation of humanity, Miraclewoman is much more confident in their actions and frequently chides him for seeing the previous state of humanity as something special worthy of preservation. Their relationship comes under strain when she finally persuades Miracleman to act on the newly resurrected Young Miracleman's feelings for him. However, the latter reacts with anger and flees Olympus. Miraclewoman however maintains her belief that it is the root cause of Young Miracleman's unhappiness.

== Powers and abilities ==
Miraclewoman can fly, has super-strength and is invulnerable due to reverse engineered Qys technology. Due to her high level of intelligence and empathy harnessed to her high level of confidence, Miraclewoman is unusually perceptive. She also has highly attuned senses.

== Reception ==
Reviewing the Marvel version of Miracleman #12 (reprinting Miraclewoman's origin story) in 2014 for ComicBook.com, Michael Brown criticised Miraclewoman's dismissive attitude towards discovering her sexual abuse and rape at the hands of Gargunza, noting that "It doesn't help that just about every one of Moore's stories that I've read has included some form of sexual violence, whether it be Hyde and the Invisible Man in The League of Extraordinary Gentlemen, the Joker and Barbara Gordon in Batman: The Killing Joke, the Comedian in Watchmen, etc.".
