= Miracleman =

Superhero comic book series

- The cover to Miracleman #1 from 1985, art by Garry Leach.

Character information
- Created by: Mick Anglo

Publication information
- Publisher: Quality Communications (1982–1984); Eclipse Comics (1985–1993); Marvel Comics (2014–present)
- Schedule: Monthly; Bi-monthly
Title(s)
- Quality Communications
- Warrior #1–18, #20–21
- Marvelman Special #1
- Eclipse Comics
- Miracleman #1–24
- Miracleman 3-D #1
- Miracleman Family #1–2
- Miracleman: Apocrypha #1–3
- Marvel Comics
- Miracleman #1–16
- All-New Miracleman Annual #1
- Miracleman by Gaiman & Buckingham #1–6
- Miracleman (2022) #0
- Miracleman by Gaiman & Buckingham: The Silver Age #1–7
- Formats: Ongoing series Limited series
- Genre: Superhero, horror
- Publication date: March 1982 – present

Creative team
- Writer(s): Alan Moore; Neil Gaiman; Mark Buckingham
- Artist(s): Garry Leach; Alan Davis; John Ridgway; Chuck Austen; John Totleben; Mark Buckingham
- Penciller(s): Rick Veitch
- Letterer(s): Wayne Truman; Joe Caramanga; Todd Klein
- Colorist(s): Ron Courtney; Sam Parsons; D'Israeli; Steve Oliff; Jordie Bellaire

Miracleman (Note: Since licensing the characters from Mick Anglo in 2009, Marvel Comics have used the Marvelman name for original 1954–1959 appearances and the Miracleman name for revival material.) is a superhero comic book series, centred on the character of the same name. Originally created by Mick Anglo and published by L. Miller & Son, Ltd. as Marvelman between 1954 and 1963, the character was revived in 1982 for a revisionist story written by Alan Moore, beginning in the pages of British anthology Warrior. From 1985 the character was renamed Miracleman, and the series was continued by American publisher Eclipse Comics until 1993. Since 2009 the rights to the character have been licensed by Marvel Comics, who have published new material.

== Creation ==
By 1954, Hackney-based publisher L. Miller & Son, Ltd had experienced considerable success reprinting the adventures of Captain Marvel and Captain Marvel Jr., licensed from Fawcett Publications. However, legal action by DC Comics led to Fawcett cancelling the titles, cutting off Miller's source of material. Not wanting to lose two of their bestselling titles, Len Miller contacted artist Mick Anglo, whose Gower Street Studios had already created cover art for many L. Miller & Son comics. He designed the characters as the similarly powered Marvelman and Young Marvelman, with the titles renamed accordingly from their respective 25th editions. Anglo initially handled the strip himself while it was shaped before involving other artists from his studio, including Don Lawrence, Ron Embleton and Denis Gifford, who would all go on to have successful careers in the industry. The weekly comics were very successful, exceeding the sales of their predecessors, and led to several spin-offs – including a third title from October 1956, Marvelman Family, a monthly that featured Marvelman and Young Marvelman teaming up with Kid Marvelman that would run until 1959.

Sales however began to fall after the ban on importing American comics was lifted in November 1959. In 1960 they had dropped to a degree where L. Miller & Son switched the title to monthly reprint titles, and Anglo ended his relationship with Miller. Marvelman and Young Marvelman were finally cancelled after the February 1963 editions – both having reached No. 370. The publisher subsequently entered bankruptcy.

=== Ownership ===
At the time of Marvelman's creation it was industry standard that British comic characters were created on a work for hire basis, with the works belonging to the publisher, The characters spent over two decades in publishing limbo based on the false premise that Anglo had sold the rights to the character in the 1980s. However, in 2009 it emerged that Anglo had actually retained the rights to the character from its initial creation in 1954.

== Revival ==
=== Marvelman at Quality Communications (1982–1984) ===
When planning Warrior, editor Dez Skinn planned a similar set of content to his work with Marvel UK, and identified the need for the comic to have a superhero strip. Having read Marvelman as a child and having encountered Mick Anglo earlier in his career, Skinn was aware of the character's status as a historic British superhero and settled on a revival for Warrior, explaining:

It was always going to be Marvelman. I knew the character's history: I'd had a few Annuals as a kid and those cheap and nasty little comics. Wasn't particularly thrilled with them, outside of occasional stunning art, but I'd always had a soft spot for Mick Anglo ... So, given the difference between a brand-new character who would sell no more copies, or a somewhat forgotten character who might sell about a dozen more, I opted to follow the similar relaunch I'd done with Captain Britain—tease at first, then, as a bonus, surprise those who actually cared. If it failed, it was only six pages out of 52—the beauty of the anthology approach.

Skinn's first two choices to write Marvelman were Steve Parkhouse and Steve Moore. Both expressed a lack of interest, and when Moore told Skinn that his friend Alan Moore (Note: While Alan Moore and Steve Moore had a long friendship and collaborated closely they were not related.) would "give his eye teeth" to write Marvelman, Skinn agreed to let him submit a pitch for the series. Alan Moore had also read Marvelman as a child before discovering DC Comics. However, as a teenager he found some of the Marvelman annuals while holidaying in Great Yarmouth, and enjoyed them more than he had expected. Also influenced by reading Harvey Kurtzman's Mad spoof "Superduperman", he was fascinated by the idea of what had happened to the fictional character in the meantime.

...realizing that since I hadn't seen an actual Marvelman since the early sixties the title had probably been discontinued, I wondered idly what Marvelman was doing these days. I was struck by the image of the eternally youthful and exuberant hero as a middle-aged man, trudging the streets and trying fruitlessly to remember his magic word.

Some years later as a budding writer with credits for 2000AD and Doctor Who Monthly under his belt, Moore mentioned this in an interview with David Lloyd for The Society for Strip Journalists, a small press British comics industry publication. Moore provided a detailed proposal for a revival that updated the story to present times; Moore even suggested that should the idea to revive Marvelman be abortive most of it would be salvageable as "a pastiche character called Miracle Man". Skinn was impressed, and asked for a script for the first episode on spec; after this passed muster Moore was signed on as writer. Skinn's first picks for artist were Dave Gibbons and Brian Bolland, but both declined. Instead Garry Leach, Warrior's art director, was assigned to draw the strip. Leach's style involved heavy photo reference, and he designed Marvelman to resemble actor Paul Newman, Liz Moran after Audrey Hepburn and the adult Kid Marvelman as a mix of Jon Finch and David Bowie. He also updated the character's distinctive "MM" logo to a more modern look and settled on a lithe physique for the superhero instead of a muscular look. For his part, Alan Moore worked with Steve Moore on a chronology that would tie the Warrior strips together as part of Skinn's plan to have the heroes eventually work together as a team named "Challenger Force", with Marvelman, Moore and Leach's Warpsmith, Skinn's Big Ben and new character Firedrake among the planned members. Few of the elaborate ideas in their chronology (such as V for Vendetta being set on an alternate Earth where Marvelman had never returned, Emil Gargunza being the creator of the Fate computer and Axel Pressbutton's adventures being set far in the future of Marvelman) would come to fruition before Warrior folded.

The first 6-page episode appeared in the first issue of Warrior (dated March 1982) which also included a four-page article on the character's history penned by Skinn.; the character was not named on the cover or the index, with his identity only being confirmed on the final page of the story. For the fourth issue, branded as the Warrior Summer Special, the story suddenly jumped forward three years in a story that hinted at the future plans for the combined universe. The strip returned to telling Marvelman's 1982 rebirth from Warrior #5; however, Leach's meticulous style was causing delays. Moore would later claim Leach was too slow, while Skinn would blame Moore's overdetailed panel descriptions. Leach for his part noted that while the scripts were incredibly detailed he would simply ignore details he felt were extraneous, and felt Moore was always open to suggestions; for example it was Leach's idea that Kid Marvelman would retain his business suit during his confrontation with Marvelman as he felt this better fitted the tone of the story than the character's fifties costume. Artist Mick Austin provided painted covers of the character for two issues, the first of which would later receive an Eagle Award.

Nevertheless, Leach's workload as art director for the magazine and artist on Marvelman proved too great. Moore suggested Alan Davis as a replacement, with whom he had a productive relationship on Marvel UK's Captain Britain strip and in 2000AD's D.R. & Quinch. Skinn recalled he had baulked at the idea of having the two most prominent superhero strips in the country sharing creative teams but relented, and the first 'book' ("A Dream of Flying") concluded after 10 chapters in Warrior #11. Warrior meanwhile had attracted good notices, including major recognition at the Eagle Awards, but was struggling with sales and heavily subsidised by Skinn's comic shop business to keep going, while the creative teams began quibbling about the division of spoils and the potentially constrictive Challenger Force concept. Moore and Leach would shortly collaborate again on Warpsmith for Warrior. Warrior #12 featured a dialogue-free Young Marvelman story set in flashback, written by Moore and drawn by John Ridgway before Book Two began in #13. Warrior #17 saw Ridgway again take art duties for a double-length flashback strip tying into the main narrative, this time featuring all three members of the Marvelman Family.

==== Marvelman Special ====
Part of Skinn's informal agreement with Anglo was the potential to earn royalties from reprints of vintage material; this combined with the positive reception to Marvelman in particular led to the publication of the fateful Marvelman Special in 1984. Moore and Davis provided wrapping sequences that framed the strips as an epilogue to Book One, featuring a pair of unnamed cleaners tidying the Project Zarathustra bunker while watching some of the video cassettes held there - the revival having retconned the characters' older adventures as dreams induced by Emil Gargunza. This conceit allowed reprints of material from Marvelman, Young Marvelman and Marvelman Family to be printed without disrupting continuity, as well as a Big Ben strip previously created by Skinn (who was credited under the pseudonym Edgar Henry) and artist Ian Gibson, the character having appeared as a guest in the Marvelman strip.

After Warrior #21, Marvelman disappeared from the title partway through the second 'book' "The Red King Syndrome". Skinn would publicly blame this on Marvel Comics taking legal action over the titling of the Marvelman Special. However the truth was that Moore and Davis had fallen out and due to the ownership structure of the property it could not be continued without the approval of both. Regardless, what Moore saw as Marvel's bullying tactics and the unfair principle of the American company trying to object to the name of a character created before they had switched to their current identity would greatly contribute to his decision to refuse to work for Marvel again. At this stage, that Anglo retained ownership of the Marvelman characters was unknown, and it was instead believed by all involved that the rights were split between Moore, Leach, Davis and Quality Communications the strip was unable to continue without approval from all parties. A young Grant Morrison, having recently begun working on Warrior strip The Liberators, was eager to take over but this was vetoed by Moore. As of 2023 the black-and-white unmodified Warrior strips with the original Marvelman-related names have not been collected. Warrior ended after 26 issues with no further appearances from Marvelman; the title had been running at a loss since it began publication, with Skinn estimating it had cost him in the region of $40,000 across its life.

=== Miracleman at Eclipse Comics (1985–1993) ===
Following the demise of Warrior, and after unsuccessful negotiations with DC and Marvel, Skinn struck a deal with the Schanes brothers at Pacific Comics of San Diego in 1984 to continue the story - unaware at the time that he did not have the rights to do so. Most of Pacific's assets were taken over by Guerneville-based rival Eclipse Comics after being won at a foreclosure auction by co-owner Dean Mullaney, including the Marvelman deal. Initially the title was advertised and promoted as Marvelman. However to avoid any further legal action the title was retitled Miracleman, with the characters renamed accordingly; previewing the series in Amazing Heroes, Eclipse editor-in-chief Cat Yronwode suggested she had considered a write-in campaign to name the hero. The renaming seems to have taken place independently from "Miracleman" having been among the working names for the character considered by Anglo and Miller, and its use for a further derivative of Marvelman created by Anglo and publishing in 1965 as Miracle Man. It was in fact suggested by Moore as an alternate name during his original Warrior proposal should Skinn had ultimately decided on a fresh work instead of resurrecting Marvelman, and he had used it for an analogue of the character briefly featured in his work on Marvel UK's Captain Britain strip. The new title was announced in May 1985, shortly before publication.

==== Reprints ====
The bi-monthly Miracleman title began in August 1985 by reprinting the extant Warrior material, resized from UK magazine size to US comic book format and edited by Yronwode. Book One had been completed in Warrior previously but underwent modification before publication by Eclipse; the material was colourised by Ron Courtney, and initially the format allowed multiple Warrior episodes to be reprinted in a single issue, initially priced at 75¢ - at the time the cheapest price a full-colour direct-sales only ongoing comic had been published with. All references to "Marvelman" and its derivatives were modified to "Miracleman". As the American title was a standard 36 pages at this stage the strip contents were entirely Miracleman material, meaning three chapters per issue. As a result, Moore took the opportunity to insert a prelude in Miracleman #1 - a modified, colourised L. Miller & Son strip called "Marvelman Family and the Invaders from the Future". (Note: Originally printed in Marvelman Family #1 in October 1956.) Moore reworked some of the dialogue and an additional page consisting of a gradual zoom into Miracleman's eye, accompanied by a quotation from Friedrich Nietzsche's Thus Spake Zarathustra. Skinn provided a history of the original character for American readers(slightly modified from the similar piece that had appeared in the first issue of Warrior), while Moore also wrote a text feature on the character for the second issue. Miracleman #2 also debuted the title's letters page, named "Miracle Mail", that would act as a forum for the series and its stories, and was initially answered by Yronwode herself. New covers were also commissioned, featuring work from notable artists such as Howard Chaykin, Jim Starlin and Paul Gulacy.

Material from Quality's Marvelman Special was also used but instead of being colourised the relettered pages were subjected to the stereoscopy process by Ray Zone and released as the one-shot Miracleman 3D #1 in October 1985, one of a number of such titles issued by Eclipse at the time. In order to accommodate visually impaired readers unable to view 3D comics, a limited edition mail order black-and-white only version was also produced in limited numbers. The Young Marvelman and Marvelman Family fill-in strips from Warrior were also woven into the reprints. The only material skipped was the future-set story "The Yesterday Gambit", partly due to it no longer cleanly fitting into Moore's plans.

The series received a positive reception, with Amazing Heroes reviewer R.A. Jones saying "the book deserves to be a hit" after reading the first issue; he reminded readers again to buy it before the second issue appeared. Miracleman went on to win 'Best New Series' at the 1986 Kirby Awards; Miracleman #1 was also nominated as 'Best Single Issue', but lost to Daredevil #227.

==== New material ====
After the Warrior material ran out new stories by Moore appeared from Miracleman #6 that broadly retained many of the plans established in the Quality proposals and chronology; for example, the writer has recalled discussing the planned realistic depiction of Miracleman's daughter Winter with Skinn before the strip stalled. However, other aspects evolved as Moore grew as a writer. Art duties were undertaken by Chuck Austen, then working under his birthname Chuck Beckum. The artist was picked by Moore and announced at the 1985 San Diego Comic Con, and character art he produced featured in #3's letters page. From issue 7 Eclipse increased the price of the title to 95¢, the 75¢ price having been unsustainable despite respectable sales. Austen completed all of the following issue, which was split into two chapters to preserve continuity of the format with previous work. Reception continued to be strong, with R.A. Jones praising the first six issues at length - noting that the revisionist story "will not spell the death of the superhero, but it will show that there are no limits to what can be done by the genre - save those imposed by our too-small minds.".

However soon after the series hit the first of what would be a number of delays, as Eclipse's offices flooded. As a result, Miracleman #7 was delayed and #8 - instead of featuring the birth of Miracleman's daughter as announced in the previous issue -would instead consist of two modified Mick Anglo-era strips and a preview for the unrelated Eclipse series The New Wave, wrapped by a self-referential framing sequence created by and featuring Yronwode and Austen. While the framing sequence mocked Marvel's former practice of running reprints, critic R.A. Jones would note that this honestly would have been more convincing if it had been on the cover, instead of only revealed in the interior. The experiment would not be repeated during later delays. Following #8 Austen left the title, infuriated by coming home to find Yronwode berating his grandmother by phone over late artwork. Austen for his part was unable to recollect receiving a script for the originally planned version of the issue. Moore's relationship with Yronwode and Eclipse would also decay as the company failed to provide the writer requested documentation that Alan Davis had consented to his work being printed in the title; this was because the artist - not on speaking terms with Moore at the time - had not given permission; Eclipse went ahead and printed his work anyway and according to Davis made little attempt to pay him for doing so. As Moore's scripts would typically require very little editing and he still lived in England at the time he largely avoided interacting with Yronwode for the rest of the writer's run on the title.

Austen was replaced by Rick Veitch from Miracleman #9. Veitch was a fan of the series, crediting it as an influence on his own revisionist superhero story The One. The cover bore a warning due to featuring "graphic scenes of childbirth" as it saw the delivery of Miracleman and Liz's daughter Winter. The idea of doing a realistic birth sequence was something both Moore and Yronwode both felt passionately about. Having noticed that a previous comics delivery had used a Hustler centrefold as reference, the editor instructed Veitch to model it instead on A Child is Born, a book featuring photo studies of a birth taken by Lennart Nilsson. After a South California retailer told Yronwode they would not stock the issue after learning of its contents, the editor chose to put a sarcastic warning on the front cover, styled after the Surgeon General health warning appearing on cigarette packaging and using wording she had seen used in a warning on a Today report. While the issue has been frequently cited as causing great controversy, Moore recalled response was positive - though he noted that Skinn had blanched at the idea when first proposed for Warrior. Yronwode would claim the issue drew a lot of negative criticism but would later note this was mainly in fanzines. The following issue concluded Book Two with a number of teasers for Book Three, with the art again from Veitch. Both issues also saw a format change, with a single 16-page chapter of Miracleman and a back-up strip - initially fellow Warrior alumni Laser Eraser and Pressbutton. R.A. Jones remained a strong supporter of the series, naming it fourth on his list of favourite comics from 1986.

==== Olympus ====
For the third arc, Moore wanted a single artist to illustrate the work - feeling that while all of the artists on Book Two had been capable the chopping and changing had left the story with an "uncertain" tone. He selected John Totleben, with whom he had previously collaborated on Swamp Thing for DC Comics; Totleben had already contributed the cover to Miracleman #9. Moore had considered quitting the title after the end of Book Two after Yronwode and Mullaney berated his then-wife Phyllis over the phone over deadlines, but ultimately decided to stay on due to the opportunity to link up with Totleben again. The first result of their latest collaboration was Miracleman #11, released in May 1987, with the artist drawing heavily on the style of Virgil Finlay. However Totleben began struggling with what was initially diagnosed as retinitis pigmentosa, (Note: In 2001 Totleben in fact found he was suffering from usher syndrome.) greatly slowing his work-rate. Moore vociferously resisted any suggestion of replacing Totleben, resulting in the nominally bi-monthly six issues taking over two and a half years to complete; by this point the series' slow schedule was well known. Totleben's work on Miracleman would subsequently be shortlisted for the 1988 Eisner Awards and received praise from Andy Mangels of Amazing Heroes due to being "incredibly richly textured", with the writer placing Miracleman 6th on his list of the 20 best comics then in publication.

While the narrative broadly followed the plans Moore had originally mapped out during the Warrior days both his own growth as a writer and the opportunity of collaborating with Totleben saw the story evolve considerably. The storyline featured a graphic showdown between Miracleman and his allies and the returning Kid Miracleman in a devastated London, which Moore intended as a demonstration on the damage a superhuman battle could result in on the real world; Totleben drew on Francisco Goya's The Disasters of War and the American Civil War photography of Mathew Brady to portray the carnage in a realistic fashion. Contrary to popular belief, Miracleman #15 was not short-printed - Eclipse's sales manager at the time, Beau Smith, estimated the issue had the same print run of 85,000 copies as others of the period, and attributed the aftermarket demand to the story's critical reputation. Virginia Williams-Pennick praised the issue's realism in Amazing Heroes, noting that "The atrocities perpetrated on innocent humans by Bates are nightmarish in the extreme".

Thomas Yeates would provide uncredited assistance to Totleben for a few panels of Miracleman #16, which saw the arc conclude with Miracleman taking control of Earth and turning into the utopia in what the writer called a "benign dictatorship", admitting he intentionally left flaws in the apparent paradise:.

Everybody's dreams come true. What I wanted to do was show the blissfulness of it all, but at the same time you can't point your finger on what's wrong; it's very difficult. There's got to be something wrong with this. There's something that feels wrong.

At the time Moore had announced the issue as the last he would write for a superhero title; while positively reviewing the comic for Amazing Heroes, Jeffrey S. Lang called it a "valedictory address" and praised its thought-provoking nature. The series itself meanwhile was nominated for Best Continuing Series at the 1991 Eisners, as was Moore's writing.

==== Miracleman Family ====
In 1988 Eclipse produced a two-issue limited series entirely made up of reprints named Miracleman Family, with the issues dated May and September 1988. Due to the technology of the time, Eclipse were restricted to reprinting material they could find physical copies of. The series presented tales originally printed in Marvelman, Young Marvelman and Marvelman Family, relettered by Wayne Truman to update the names, and coloured by Olyoptics and Marcus David. As the first issue recounted Young Miracleman's origin an editorial note was included to remind readers that the stories had been retconned as dreams induced by Gargunza. The second issue featured a brief one-page history on the characters by former Gower Street Studios artist Denis Gifford, and the issues featured new covers by Garry Leach and Paul Gulacy, respectively.

==== Neil Gaiman ====
Having completed the stories he planned for the character, Moore left the title, hand-picking Neil Gaiman as his successor as a result of Violent Cases and other comics Gaiman had written.

[Alan Moore] said "now, I should warn you that by the end of Miracleman #16 I will have solved all crimes, ended all wars and created an absolutely perfect world where no further stories can occur. Do you want to back out now? Please feel free." I said, "No, I'd love to."

While initially intimidated by following Moore, Gaiman was swift to see the story possibilities presented by the apparent utopia. Gaiman chose artist Mark Buckingham as a collaborator after being impressed with his work for Heartbreak Hotel; he initially considered Dave McKean, who would instead provide covers for the first "book" of six issues. The writer planned three arcs for the series - The Golden Age, The Silver Age and The Dark Age, which he loosely mapped out. The first arc was intended to world-build, using concepts mentioned by Moore's final issue, and the pair decided that rather than compete with the epic style of the previous arc they would adopt an anthology approach, with Buckingham wildly varying the style and medium across the stories - later saying he approached the book as an "ongoing sketchbook". The characters from the series also featured in Eclipse's company-wide crossover Total Eclipse; issue #4 of the crossover featured a backup strip called "Screaming" set in the Miracleman universe - the debut of the new creative team, some ten months before Moore and Totleben had actually completed their final issue on the main title. The Golden Age was published with - by the title's standards - relative speed in Miracleman #17-22 between June 1990 and August 1991. Gaiman and Buckingham were joined on the title from Miracleman #21 by D'Israeli, who painted Buckingham's work. By the series' standards The Golden Age met with relatively lukewarm reaction, with some readers feeling the small-scale stories indicated there was little future to Miracleman in terms of fresh stories. However, Jeffrey Lang praised Miracleman #17, and felt it was unclear if the Golden Age appellation was ironic, while T.M. Maple lauded Gaiman's characterisation in Miracleman #20. The series was again shortlisted for the 1992 Eisners as 'Best Continuing Series', while Gaiman was recognised as 'Best Writer' for his work on Miracleman combined with The Sandman and The Books of Magic. The title remained one of Eclipse's strongest sellers and, with the company's fortunes dipping, they attempted to find a way to increase the output while not alienating the creative team, who had veto on any material featuring the character. The first attempt to make extra revenue was Miracleman: Apocrypha.

The first issue of Gaiman and Buckingham's second arc appeared some ten months after the conclusion of The Golden Age, in June 1992. The arc was planned to revolve around the revived Young Miracleman and his reaction to his old friend's new world, examining Miracleman's doubts about his actions and Miraclewoman's judgement. Barry Windsor-Smith, a fan of the character, was engaged to provide covers. The next issue didn't arrive until over a year later; Yronwode would claim that Gaiman had deadline issues at the time, feeling he was over-committed to other projects. However, Gaiman's recollection was that Eclipse were tardy in paying the creators for their work, and as a result they wouldn't start on an issue until payment for the previous instalment had arrived. Around this time Eclipse were able to persuade Gaiman to greenlight an ongoing spin-off named Miracleman Triumphant, which unlike Apocrypha would entirely take place in the main continuity. Set during a ten-year gap between the events of The Golden Age and The Silver Age, the series was set to be written by Eclipse editor Fred Burke with art by Mike Deodato, with Gaiman having editorial veto over the contents. Despite a trade advert for the series being printed and the first issue being solicited, none of Triumphant was published before Eclipse went out of business, and conflicting accounts of how close it was to release have emerged since. Yronwode has claimed the first issue was completed and the second well underway, with the company's financial problems preventing Miracleman Triumphant #1 from being released in a similar manner to the hold-up for Miracleman #25. However, Gaiman has said he never saw any of the series and had not signed off on it (also noting Deodato was not paid for his work), both statements that Yronwode disputes. Some of Deodato's work has since surfaced; it is currently unknown if the series will ever be officially published.

==== The end of Eclipse ====
In 1995, after several financial reversals and Yronwode's divorce from Mullaney, Eclipse declared bankruptcy, leaving Miracleman without a publisher. Only two issues of "The Silver Age" had been printed; a third was ready but due to their dire finances Eclipse were unable to find a printer who would provide them with the credit needed to actually get the comic produced. Worried by Mullaney's erratic behaviour at the time, Yronwode returned the artwork to Gaiman. Buckingham would allow several pages to be printed in George Khoury's 2001 non-fiction history of the series, Kimota! The Miracleman Companion. "The Dark Age" was originally planned to take place "three or four hundred years" after the events of the Silver Age, featuring the apparent return of Mike Moran to a world long abandoned by superhumans, and feature Kid Miracleman. Gaiman's original proposal for the trio of storylines simply noted that "things go bad".

Legal disputes over the ownership of the character, based on the misconception that Mick Anglo had sold the rights to Dez Skinn, which never occurred, left the title out of print, leading to back issues and trade paperbacks of the series greatly increasing in price in the collector's market.

=== Marvelman and Miracleman at Marvel Comics (2010–present) ===
In 2009 it came to light that Anglo had retained ownership of Marvelman since 1954. Once this was established Marvel Comics, led by creative director Joe Quesada, struck a deal directly with Anglo to license Marvelman, planning to reprint the extant material and then continue it. Anglo only had the rights to the character and the material completed by his Gower Street Studios - due to the policies of both Quality and Eclipse, creators still had the rights to their own individual work and Marvel would have to strike an agreement with each to use it, while there was some confusion as to whether the trademark for "Miracleman" was actually owned by Marvel or McFarlane, with early Marvel material pointedly only referring to the property as "Marvelman". Moore's long-running animosity with Marvel initially looked set to be a problem; however, he eventually relented and allowed Marvel to reprint his work, providing his name was not used in connection with the series. Moore stated he would donate his initial royalties for the reprints to Mick Anglo, and Marvel credited him as 'The Original Writer' on all official materials.

==== Marvelman Family's Finest ====
Marvel's first output featuring the character was the Marvelman Classic Primer, a one-shot including historical text pieces by Mike Conroy, an account of Quesada meeting Anglo and pin-ups by Mike Perkins, Doug Braithwaite, Miguel Angel Sepulveda, Jae Lee, Khoi Pham and Ben Oliver. This was followed by the six-issue limited series Marvelman: Family's Finest, reprinting restored versions of Anglo's strips from Marvelman, Young Marvelman and Marvelman Family. Cover art was produced by Marko Djurdjević and others (with many drawn from the Classic Primer), with one a modified version of Anglo's 1954 cover to Marvelman #33. That the contents were the older material rather than the 1980s revival received a mixed reaction. The series was collected as a trade paperback while two archives apiece of Marvelman Classic and Young Marvelman Classic were released. As of 2023 no further volumes of either Classic title have been released since 2012, with sales of the hardcovers having been poor - dropping below 300 copies apiece.

Anglo died on 31 October 2011, aged 95.

==== Miracleman ====
A three-year hiatus followed, with Marvel Senior Vice President of Publishing Tom Brevoort assuring fans that it would be published as "soon as everything is ready". Quesada would attribute the delay to wanting to "do it right", including acquiring original artwork and high-quality Photostats for restoration. Others have noted other potential factors, including ongoing uncertainty over who owned the 'Miracleman trademark (speculated to have actually been owned by McFarlane) and negotiations with Moore over the permission Marvel needed to reprint his work. By 2012 Marvel had secured the 'Miracleman' trademark and at New York Comic Con 2013 announced the reprints and eventual continuation would use this name, contrary to previous proclamations. Marvel opted to title the revival material 'Miracleman', while retaining 'Marvelman' for potential future use. In an interview with Comic Book Resources, Quesada said this was because it "was the coolest name" and was the name Marvel staff used when discussing the character.

A wide array of notable comic artists would provide cover art for the series, including Art Adams, John Cassaday, Dave Gibbons, Adi Granov, Bryan Hitch, J. G. Jones, Alex Maleev, Humberto Ramos, Alex Ross, Bill Sienkiewicz, Leinil Francis Yu and Quesada himself, as well as new pieces by Garry Leach, Alan Davis, John Totleben and Buckingham. The original artwork was restored by Michael Kelleher and his Kellustration company, coloured by Steve Oliff and relettered by Chris Eliopoulos for the first issue, with Joe Caramanga subsequently taking over from the latter. Miracleman #1 was released on 15 January 2014, and contained updated versions of the first two Warrior episodes; a modified vintage strip used as a prelude in the Eclipse series; a trio of restored, unmodified Gower Street Studios strips (including Marvelman's debut appearances); "Miracleman - Behind the Scenes", featuring associated work by Garry Leach; one of Conroy's articles and excerpts from Quesada meeting Anglo in 2010 (both originally from Marvelman Classic Primer). The online version of #1 also featured edited art for the digital version to cover Liz Moran's buttocks The first issue was a commercial success; according to Diamond Comic Distributors, Miracleman #1 was the 23rd best selling comic book in January 2014.

Reception to the first issue was largely positive, though some felt the supplemental material did little to justify the book's price Corey Schroeder of Comic Vine gave Miracleman #1 a grade of 4 out of 5 stars, saying, "This issue really defines a “mixed bag” in terms of what you get. On the one hand, it's very cool to see the original stories and, for me, very, very fascinating peering behind the curtain at exactly what went on behind the scenes with this character (the interview with Anglo by Joe Quesada is especially interesting, especially since very little of it focuses on the comic and a great deal focuses on the man himself) but I could see someone who couldn't care less feeling like they're paying extra for nothing. Buyer beware, in that case, but the core story here is as rock solid and resonant now as it was thirty years ago." Jesse Schedeen of IGN gave Miracleman #1 a grade of 7 out of 10, writing, "As long as you don't come into Miracleman immediately expecting the same caliber of work from Moore that he delivered on Watchmen or Swamp Thing, you'll find a thoughtful, intelligent look at a once-campy superhero. It's just a shame that Marvel insisted on cramming the issue with supplemental content and driving up the price accordingly. Wait for the trade, perhaps, but don't miss this chance to finally experience a classic." The rest of Book One followed in Miracleman #2-4; among the included extra material was the first colour versions of the future-set story "The Yesterday Gambit" (originally printed in Warrior #4 and skipped by Eclipse), "Saturday Morning Pictures" (the framing sequence for the 1984 Marvelman Special), and coloured versions of Leach's Warpsmith strips, also originally produced for Warrior.

In September 2014, the first new Miracleman material under the Marvel Comics banner was announced. All-New Miracleman Annual featured a 'lost' story that was written in the 1980s and pitched to Warrior unsuccessfully by Grant Morrison, now drawn by Quesada; it was joined by a brand new story by Peter Milligan and Mike Allred. According to Diamond Comic Distributors, All-New Miracleman Annual #1 was the 118th best selling comic book in December 2014. Michael Brown of ComicBook.com called All-New Miracleman Annual #1 a "more-than-worthy addition to the Miracleman tale"; however, Greg McElhatton of Comic Book Resources noted "I wish "All-New Miracleman Annual" #1 was better, but if anything, it's just a sharp reminder that Gaiman's success writing "Miracleman" post-Alan Moore is that much more of an impressive feat. It looks gorgeous but, considering the "All-New" part of the title, these stories have scripts that feel old and somewhat stale.".

The second book was reprinted in the same format in Miracleman issues #5-10, with backmatter including more Anglo-era strips; original artwork for many of the pages contributed by Alan Davis, Chuck Austen and Rick Veitch; and a recoloured version of the framing sequence produced by Austen and Cat Yronwode for Eclipse's Miracleman #8. Critical reception continued to be positive, with Michael Brown noting that he "was running out of ways to keep saying how good this series is". Updated versions of the third book - completing Moore's run - were printed in Miracleman #11-16, with the contents now corresponding directly to the respective Eclipse issues. Artist John Totleben provided new covers for the reprinted issues and also contributed a large amount of original artwork and sketches to the "Miracleman - Behind the Scenes" sections, which were again joined by Anglo reprints. The latter were dropped for #16, due to the final chapter of Olympus being double-length. Kid Miracleman's use of a derogatory slur in Miracleman issue #15 was intentionally not fully spelled-out in Marvel's updated version.

==== Miracleman by Gaiman & Buckingham ====
The series was retitled Miracleman by Gaiman & Buckingham in 2015, in preparation for the reprinting and continuation the pair's run, and reset with a new #1. Buckingham and collaborator D'Israeli refreshed the artwork. The story content again matched with the corresponding Eclipse issues, while the abundant sketches and artwork Buckingham provided saw the Anglo reprints dropped in favour of extended versions of "Miracleman: Behind the Scenes".

==== Timeless and the Marvel Universe ====
On 29 December 2021, the Timeless one-shot was released, featuring the Miracleman "MM" logo on the final page. Later announcements by Marvel confirmed that Miracleman would appear in the Marvel universe going forward. For the one-shot's third printing in February 2022, Buckingham produced a cover prominently featuring the character

==== 40th Anniversary ====
As part of a 2022 celebration marking the 40th anniversary of the character's revival in the pages of Warrior, Marvel issued Miracleman Omnibus (containing the entire Alan Moore run, though he was once again credited as The Original Writer) and a fresh collected edition of Miracleman: The Golden Age. Marvel also released Miracleman #0, featuring a framing sequence by Gaiman & Buckingham (modified from that of Miracleman: Apocrypha), and containing new stories "Blood on the Snow" (by Ryan Stegman), "Whisper in the Dark" (by Mike Carey and Paul Davidson), "Kimota's Miracle" (by Peach Momoko and Zack Davisson) and "The Man Whose Dreams Were Miracles" (by Jason Aaron and Leinil Francis Yu), as well as a pin-up and short cartoons by Ty Templeton. As with Apocrypha these stories were established to be fictions from the Miracleman universe. Reception to the new material was largely positive, though some noted that working knowledge of the character was required for the work to be fully appreciated. According to ICv2, Miracleman #0 was the 19th best selling comic book in October 2022.

==== Miracleman by Gaiman & Buckingham: The Silver Age ====
Marvel originally announced that the long-anticipated Silver Age storyline would continue in 2016 following publication of The Golden Age; however solicitations were cancelled when the decision was taken to comprehensively re-draw the extant material before proceeding with the rest of the story, as revealed by senior editor Nick Lowe at the 2017 San Diego Comic-Con. At the following year's SDCC Marvel used a retailer-only event to announced legal hurdles causing the cancellation had been resolved and the new series was supposed to begin publication in 2019 with the previously announced creative team of Gaiman and Buckingham on board.

On 24 June 2022, Marvel Comics announced that Gaiman and Buckingham would complete Miracleman: The Silver Age, beginning in October of the same year. Buckingham noted "Neil and I have had these stories in our heads since 1989 so it is amazing to finally be on the verge of sharing them with our readers.". Miracleman by Gaiman & Buckingham: The Silver Age #1 finally entered publication in October 22, with the first two issues updating the two instalments previously printed by Eclipse. While the material followed the same script, Buckingham recomposed and redrew many of the panels, and D'Israeli was replaced as colourist by Jordie Bellaire. David Harth of Comic Book Resources ranked Miracleman: The Silver Age #1 2nd in their "10 Best Marvel Comics Of 2022" list, writing, "Marvel's best books are must-reads for any fan, and that goes doubly for Miracleman: The Silver Age, by writer Neil Gaiman and artist Mark Buckingham. Miracleman fans have waited decades for this book, and it's impressed as much as anyone would have imagined. Gaiman and Buckingham finally finishing their Miracleman story is a wish come true. The book takes place in the early 2000s, with Miracleman having run the world for almost twenty years. A new generation of superhumans has risen and Miracleman's scientists are able to bring Young Miracleman to life. He awakens to a world unlike anything he imagined. It's an amazing book, already shaping up to be a classic."

The third issue containing the first finished publication of the next part (several pages of pencilled had been used with Gaiman and Buckingham's permission in George Khoury's 2001 non-fiction book Kimota! The Miracleman Companion). Buckingham was credited as co-writer of #4 to issue #7, which also featured a newly coloured reprint of a strip from Anglo's Young Marvelman #57 via the device of Miracleman reviewing a recording of one of the dreams induced for the Miracleman Family by Gargunza. Variant covers were once again commissioned from a host of feted artists, including Phil Jimenez, Chris Sprouse, Steve McNiven and David Aja Marvel released the digital comic Who is Miracleman? as part of their Infinity Comics Who is...? range on 8 February 2023, written by Ram V and illustrated by Leonard Kirk.

Marvel stated that they "have no new books forthcoming from [Neil Gaiman]" in January 2025 after news outlets published sexual assault accusations against him and Marvel's Executive Editor and Senior Vice President Tom Brevoort said in February 2025 that "nothing is going on with THE DARK AGE," effectively putting the run back on pause.

== Plot ==
=== Original ===
In the original material by Mick Anglo, after nobly helping save an elderly astro-scientist, Guntag Borghalt, from attackers; Daily Bugle copyboy Micky Moran is gifted the Key Harmonic of the Universe. Calling out "Kimota!" then turns Micky into the Mightiest Man in the Universe, the superhero Marvelman. As Marvelman, he is superhumanly strong, can fly and is invulnerable, and uses his powers to fight evil and disaster. Confronted with a large workload, Marvelman enlists the help of a young news messenger named Dicky Dauntless for one mission; the boy's courage impresses Marvelman and he arranges for Borghelm to also grant Dicky powers with a potion Borghlem made. Calling "Marvelman!" allows Dicky to become the Mightiest Boy in the Universe, Young Marvelman, and he also embarks on a crimefighting career. Later they are joined by a third comrade; when young Johnny Bates calls "Marvelman!" he is transformed into Kid Marvelman. The trio fight crime separately and together as the Marvelman Family. Among their enemies are the fiendish dwarf scientist Dr. Gargunza and his nephew Young Gargunza, and the superpowered alien delinquent Young Nastyman. The original stories were typically light in tone and normally self-contained – though occasionally multi-part serial storylines were produced.

=== Revival ===
Many years later, the adult Mike Moran is a freelance journalist that married to Liz Sullivan and unable to remember his past or his change-word, yet he is plagued by vivid nightmares of the Miracleman Family's final mission in 1963, where the trio were seemingly blown up by an atomic bomb up in space. While writing about a protest at a nuclear facility, the facility is suddenly infiltrated by a group of terrorists that attempt to steal plutonium. Mike accidentally whispers "Kimota" and transforms back into Miracleman. Miracleman easily takes down the terrorists and returns home to Liz, whom he reveals his newly remembered past to. Liz is skeptical at first but eventually believes with him. He discovered that former ally, Johnny Bates, the Kid Miracleman has survived and has become the founder and CEO of Sunburst Enterprises. Bates claims to have lost his powers in the 1963 blast but the Morans find out that Bates has been secretly superhuman since the blast. Having grown corrupt due to the years spent as Kid Miracleman, Mike, as Miracleman, battles Bates in London, leading Kid Miracleman to accidentally say his keyword, turning the now adult Kid Miracleman back into the 13-year old Johnny Bates. Bates, who is traumatized by the evil his alter-ego caused over the years, is hospitalized as Miracleman and Liz escape.

With the aid of Evelyn Cream, a government hitman hired by the British government to assassinate Moran but later teams up with Moran as they then discover the true nature of the Miracleman Family and their past as British government super-weapons. They also discover that all of the adventures the Miracleman Family went on were all simulations and the only true adventure they went on was the night on 1963 when they were supposed to be assassinated. Subsequently, Liz becomes pregnant with Miracleman's child and is targeted by his creator Doctor Emil Gargunza, who wants to implant his consciousness in the infant. Miracleman and Cream travel to Paraguay to confront Gargunza and save Liz, but Gargunza incapacitates Miracleman by turning him back into Moran for an hour and releases a creature called the Miracledog, which kills Cream and maims Moran. However, Mike is able to defeat the monster by turning it back into it's normal dog form before killing it. Mike eventually turns back into Miracleman after the hour passes, kills Gargunza and his henchmen, frees Liz and deliver his baby successfully.

As Gargunza used salvaged Qys technology to create the superhumans, agents of the alien race come to investigate, leading to the previously secret Miraclewoman making her presence known. The Qys are sterile, so the birth of Winter sees them form an alliance with Earth's superhumans, as well as the Warpsmiths. A traumatized Liz realizing that she can no longer live or relate with Miracleman, who is someone far beyond her own existence and understanding as she is only human. Heartbroken, Mike Moran lets the Miracleman persona take over, effectively commiting suicide spiritually.

Miracleman and the rest of his newly formed allies becomes public knowledge after Kid Miracleman returns and horrifically obliterates a large section of London, killing some forty thousand people before they are able to subdue him by forcing him to turn back into the young Johnny Bates. Johnny begs Miracleman for help and Miracleman pitifully obliges, crushing the boy's skull. As a result of the events that unfolded, Miracleman and his allies take benevolent control of Earth, molding it into a paradise. The end of the 20th century is thus a golden age of humanity, seemingly free of want thanks to the presence of the godlike beings at Olympus, a citadel built on the remains of London - although Miracleman is haunted by Liz's suggestion that he has lost touch with his humanity.

== Characters ==
- Miracleman: The superhuman form of Michael "Micky/Mike" Moran, which becomes active when he speaks the key word "Kimota".
- Young Miracleman: The superhuman form of Richard "Dicky" Dauntless, which becomes active when he speaks the key word "Miracleman".
- Kid Miracleman: The superhuman form of Jonathan "Johnny" Bates, which becomes active when he speaks the key word "Miracleman".
- Doctor Emil Gargunza: A brilliant but amoral scientist.
- Liz Moran: The wife of Mike Moran/Miracleman and their daughter, Winter.
- Miraclewoman: The superhuman form of Avril Lear, the mysterious 4th member of the Miracleman Family that becomes Miracleman's ally.
- Winter: The superhuman daughter of Miracleman and Liz.
- Evelyn Cream: A government spy and assassin that tasked by the British government with finding and killing Miracleman.
- The Qys: An eldritch alien species whose technology was used to create the Miracleman Family
- The Warpsmiths: A rival alien species to the Qys whom they eventually joins forces with.

== Reception ==
=== Critical response ===
The series has been credited as one of the first revisionist superhero comics, predating both Moore's own Watchmen and Frank Miller's Dark Knight Returns. It has received industry accolades, including Eagle Awards and Kirby Awards.

Alex Ross has cited Alan Moore's Miracleman run as a major influence on Kingdom Come Tim Callahan of Tor.com ranked the Marvelman stories from Warrior 3rd in their "10 Best Comics Written by Alan Moore" list, stating, "Marvelman is based on a Captain Marvel analogue, with the cynicism of the 1980s and a dose of real-world logic smashed into its innocent shell. The opening few chapters provide a blueprint that revisionist superhero comics would follow forever after—the revelation that everything the hero thought he knew was wrong, and he may not even really be a hero to begin with—and the inky realism of Garry Leach's drawings only helped Moore make his stand on behalf of smart, relevant, devastatingly powerful superhero comics. The fact that everyone who came after Moore took the faux-realism and the hyper-violence of Marvelman as its primary lesson isn't Moore's fault. He did it right, and they just missed the point." Jason Rhode of Paste ranked the Marvelman stories from Warrior 7th in their "10 Best Alan Moore Comics of All Time" list, asserting, "All Moore ever did was take comics seriously. Their premises, their possibilities, their audiences. It's strange to say this about a man who got kicked out high school for dealing LSD, but nobody has ever been a more faithful student than Alan Moore. Imagine a radical doctor who made their patients immortal. That's Moore. The story of Michael Moran, who remembers that he is a superman, begins as a whimsical take-off on Captain Marvel, and ends as the story of a living god. Along the way, Moore reckons with issues of morality, humanity and the fragility of our world. After Marvelman, everything was possible."

Reviewing Moore's whole run for Slate, Sam Thielman praised the series, noting "It's remarkable how powerful the book remains in spite of its occasional unevenness" Gaiman's material also received praise; Oliver Sava was positive when reviewing the collected edition for The A.V. Club, calling it "a satisfying experience discovering a more intimate, unconventional side of the superhero genre."

=== Sales ===
According to Diamond Comic Distributors, Miracleman #1 was the 23rd best selling comic book in January 2014. According to ICv2, Miracleman #0 was the 19th best selling comic book in October 2022. Miracleman: The Silver Age #1 was the 22nd advance-reordered October-shipping comic book between 12–18 August 2022.

=== Awards ===
Marvelman and Warrior received accolades in the British category at the 1984 Eagle Awards; it was voted favourite strip, with the lead as Favourite Comic Character and Kid Miracleman as Favourite Villain. The magazine itself was also recognised, as was Moore for his writing on the title and V for Vendetta. Mick Austen's cover for #7 also received an award.

== Collected editions ==
As the series progressed, Eclipse collected them in trade paperbacks, still a relative rarity at the time for an ongoing series. The first, A Dream of Flying was released in July 1988, and collected material from #1–3 of the Eclipse series (but not the framing material from Miracleman 3D). The Red King Syndrome was released two years later, featuring a cover by John Bolton and compiling strips from #4–7 & #9–10, omitting the Young Miracleman: 1957 short story from #6 and the vintage reprints from #8. Olympus, the third volume, appeared in December 1990, collecting #11–16 with a new cover from John Totleben and a foreword from journalist Mikal Gilmore. Samuel R. Delany provided the foreword for The Golden Age trade in May 1992, which collected #17–22 - aside from the short "Retrieval" strip serialised across the issues - and featured a new cover from Mark Buckingham. These collections were broadly superseded by Marvel's own trades from 2014 onwards.

Title	ISBN	Release date	Contents
Miracleman Book One	0913035610	October 1988	Material from Miracleman #1–3
Miracleman Book Two: The Red King Syndrome	1560600365	July 1990	Material from Miracleman #4–7 & 9–10
Miracleman Book Three: Olympus	1560600802	December 1990	Material from Miracleman #11–16
Miracleman Book 4: The Golden Age	156060168X	May 1992	Material from Miracleman #17–22

Marvel Comics also produced collections of their versions of the series.

Title	ISBN	Release date	Contents
Miracleman Book 1: A Dream of Flying	9780785154624	May 2014	Miracleman #1–4
Miracleman Book Two: The Red King Syndrome	9780785154648	October 2014	Miracleman #5–10
Miracleman Book Three: Olympus	9780785154662	April 2015	Miracleman #11–16 & All-New Miracleman Annual #1
Miracleman by Gaiman & Buckingham Book 1: The Golden Age Premiere	9780785190554	March 2016	Miracleman by Gaiman & Buckingham #1−6
Miracleman Omnibus	9781302947293	October 2022	Miracleman (2014) #1–16 & All-New Miracleman Annual (2014) #1
Miracleman: The Original Epic	9781302953256	September 2023	Miracleman (2014) #1–16 & All-New Miracleman Annual (2014) #1
Miracleman by Gaiman & Buckingham: The Silver Age	9781302948825	May 2024	Miracleman by Gaiman & Buckingham: The Silver Age #1−7
