= Marvelman =

Comic book series

- Marvelman on the cover of Marvelman #33, by Mick Anglo

Character information
- Created by: Mick Anglo

Publication information
- Publisher: L. Miller & Son, Ltd.
- Schedule: Weekly (1953–1960); Monthly (1960–1963)
- Genre: Superhero
- Publication date: 3 February 1954 – February 1963
- Number of issues: 347; 9 annuals

Creative team
- Writer(s): Mick Anglo
- Artist(s): Mick Anglo; James Bleach; Norman Light; Don Lawrence; Roy Parker; John Whitlock; Frank Daniels; Dennis Gifford

Marvelman was a British Golden Age superhero comic book, published by L. Miller & Son in the United Kingdom between 1954 and 1963. The lead character was originally created by Mick Anglo as a replacement for Captain Marvel due to Fawcett Publications ending the latter's titles following legal action by DC Comics.

In 1982 the character was revived in the comics anthology Warrior, and later renamed Miracleman in 1985. Since 2009, the rights to the character have been licensed from Anglo by Marvel Comics, who have reprinted some of the vintage material under the original Marvelman name.

== Creation ==
With the British economy struggling to recover from World War II, a ban on importing American comics was enacted, leading to a boom in indigenous comics. However, a loophole existed whereby a British publisher could import overseas comics, print them and sell the results. This proved to be a lucrative move for L. Miller & Son, especially when they licensed Captain Marvel and Captain Marvel Jr. from Fawcett Publications. However, after losing a landmark legal case against National Comics in 1952, Fawcett discontinued their superhero material, cutting off the supply of strips for L. Miller & Son. Not wanting to cancel the highly profitable title, Len Miller contacted artist Mick Anglo, whose Gower Street Studios had already created cover art for many L. Miller & Son comics. Anglo devised the characters of Marvelman and Young Marvelman to replace them, featuring a similar premise of young men who could change into powerful superheroes. Working titles had included both Captain Miracle and Miracleman, both of which would be used by Anglo for later characters.

== Publishing history ==
=== Transition ===
L. Miller & Son's Captain Marvel #24 featured the title "Captain Marvel—The Marvelman" on the front cover; inside the editorial revealed that Billy Batson had decided to retire and lead a normal life with his place being taken by Micky Moran as Marvelman. Thus Marvelman took over the numbering of the Captain Marvel series, leading to the character debuting on 3 February 1954 in Marvelman #25, which contained the stories "Marvelman and the Atomic Bomber" and "Marvelman and the Stolen Radium". A similar transition took place in sister title Captain Marvel Jr., which soon became Young Marvelman.

=== Content ===
Like its predecessor, Marvelman was a weekly comic. In order to cut expenditure in resizing or modifying artwork from American publishers, L. Miller & Son retained the same dimensions as US comic books. Each issue was 28 pages long, and the interiors were printed in black and white on newsprint, with only the covers in colour. Issues typically contained two 8-page Marvelman tales and a third back-up feature from the inventory. In addition there were humour strips and, bookending the content, a letter from the unnamed editor (penned by Anglo) and a page crudely styled like a page from the Daily Bugle (Note: Not to be confused with the Daily Bugle later featured in Marvel's Spider-Man.)—the fictional newspaper Moran worked for—featuring a preview for the next issue, other fragments of news and plugs for other L. Miller & Son books. It was priced at 7d, and would stay that way until the title's demise.

Anglo initially handled the strip himself while it was shaped before involving other artists from his studio, including James Bleach, Norman Light and Don Lawrence. The British comic industry of the time did not keep exhaustive records of creators—with the strips themselves bearing no credits—but among the Gower Street Studios artists identified as working on Marvelman, Young Marvelman and/or Marvelman Family were Ron Embleton, George Stokes and Denis Gifford, who would all go on to have successful careers in the industry. To keep the work on schedule Anglo adopted a system broadly similar to the "Marvel method" later used by Stan Lee—to avoid complicated scripts with overdetailed panel descriptions he would instead devise a plot outline, pass it to one of the studio's artists and then write dialogue and narration to fit the resulting pages of art. Writing about the artists from the studio in 1977, Anglo would recall that this allowed the artists to put their own stamp on the character, noting that Lawrence's were "elongated"; Roy Parker used "bulging muscles and a lantern jaw"; while John Whitlock and Norman Light both made the character barrel-chested. He also claimed the contributions of Gifford and Frank Daniels on the title brought a poor reader response.

Back-up features were either produced by Gower Street Studios or were from other series licensed by Miller, including adventure serial Lance and science fiction heroes Captain Zip Morgan of Space Patrol and Johnny Galaxia (an import of a Spanish comic strip created by Josep Beá and Blay Navarro). In-house humour strips such as Young Joey, The Friendly Soul and Flip and Flop were also used to fill single or half pages. These were initially devised by Anglo before he handed them over to Gifford, who was more at home with humour strips than superhero material. Anglo's assistant Dorothy Saporito and her successor Roshan Kanga also helped finish off material for the comic.

Marvelman was similar to Captain Marvel: a young copy boy named Micky Moran encounters an astrophysicist called Guntag Barghelt (instead of the wizard Shazam) who gives him superpowers based on atomic energy instead of magic. To transform into Marvelman, he speaks the word "Kimota", which is phonetically "atomic" backwards—Anglo changed it to avoid readers thinking the word began with a soft 'c'. Typically, either through his work (Moran being sent on a fact-finding mission by the Bugle editor was a common device) or happenstance Moran would stumble across some sort of criminal activity, change into Marvelman and save the day. Most of the adventures were self-contained, though occasionally a 'Marvelman serial' would run across multiple issues. When surprised, both Micky and Marvelman were given to exclaiming "Holy Macaroni!". The character's origin was initially only relayed in a text box accompanying the first frame of each adventure, before later being told in the strip "The Birth of Marvelman" in Marvelman #65, dated 13 November 1954. In Marvelman #102 a third member of the Marvelman Family appeared—Johnny Bates was gifted the power to transform into Kid Marvelman, and would briefly feature as a back-up in Marvelman.

The title's most lasting villain was evil scientist Doctor Gargunza, a reinvention of Captain Marvel's arch-enemy Doctor Sivana, given a new look that involved a black widow's peak, spectacles and an exaggerated overbite, a distinctive "Hak! Hak!" chuckle and a name invented by Anglo's brother. A prototype of the character called Professor Zargunza would appear in Marvelman #26, with side-parted white hair, before Gargunza debuted in "Marvelman and the Skeletons in the Cupboard!" in Marvelman #27. The visually and narratively identical Cuprini would also feature in Marvelman #32 before the character's identity and design settled down. While Gargunza would invariably lose and be bought to justice as each scheme failed, the character would always escape and return on numerous occasions. Another recurring antagonist was the fictional Eastern bloc country of Boromania, agents of whom were defeated by Marvelman on numerous occasions. Other story opportunities were opened up when Marvelman gained the ability to fly fast enough around the Earth to travel through time, usually into the past but occasionally into the future. This allowed him to visit periods such as England in the Elizabethan era or the Middle Ages, the reign of Louis XIV, the Wild West or American Civil War, and also meet historical figures including Hannibal, Hippocrates, and Charles II. His adventures also saw him cross paths with fictional or mythical characters such as King Arthur, Icarus, Scheherazade and Dick Whittington.

=== Success ===
Marvelman was a success, exceeding the sales of Captain Marvel, and led to several spin-offs. A fan club called simply the Marvelman Club was initiated, with members receiving a pin badge, a key to decipher coded messages printed in the comic's editorial pages and, later, birthday cards in exchange for a Shilling. Anglo was initially unhappy about the prospect of adding running a fan club to his workload, but the publisher offered to handle it instead. Marvelman annuals were also produced by L. Miller & Son; these 96-page hardback books featured a mix of strip adventures (some of which featured coloured art, the only material from the original run to do so), illustrated text stories and activity pages. Two "Magic Painting" books were also produced—these featured pages pre-coated with watercolour paint, which would be revealed when a wet paintbrush was applied. Among the series' fans were Tommy Cooper, who would mention the series in his autobiography Just Like That, which referred to a story in Marvelman #267 where the hero was transformed into 'Cooperman'. By popular demand a third title was added to the range in October 1956, Marvelman Family, a monthly that featured Marvelman and Young Marvelman teaming up with Kid Marvelman, which would run for 30 issues.

=== Overseas ===
The character was exported to several other countries. Young's Merchandising Company of Sydney reprinted the titles for the Australian and New Zealand markets while oversized editions were released in both magazine and album formats in Italy, while the character was modified and renamed Jack Marvel in the pages of Brazilian comic Marvel Magazine. While employed by L. Miller & Son in 1958, Anglo also created Superhombre for Spanish publisher Editorial Ferma, a character with considerable similarity to Marvelman. (Note: In 1965, Superhombre's adventures were imported back into the UK and released as Miracle Man.)

=== Decline and cancellation ===
British sales however began to fall after the ban on importing American comics was lifted in November 1959. In 1960 they had dropped to a degree where L. Miller & Son switched the title to a monthly status and the contents to reprints, while the annuals would shrink in size and quality. As a result, Mick Anglo left the title, turning down an offer from Arnold Miller and instead setting up his own Anglo Features, using material created for Marvelman for the short-lived Captain Miracle. Original cover-art was still created, though a lack of reference material meant the new artists frequently depicted the character as having brown hair, while Captain Marvel's cape even made a reappearance on cover for the 1961 annual. Even this was not enough to keep the comic profitable and—with the publisher in dire financial straits—the final issues of Marvelman and Young Marvelman—#370 of each—were dated February 1963. The annuals would also end publication the same year.

== Ownership ==
L. Miller & Son would stop publishing comics in 1963, and would stay in existence until 1974. The company's comic assets, including the asbestos printing plate masters, were purchased by Alan Class Comics, who would only reprint a handful of horror and science fiction strips from the L. Miller & Son library. At the time it was industry standard that British comic characters were created on a work for hire basis, with the works belonging to the publisher, and the characters spent over a decade in publishing limbo on this false premise. However, in 2009 it emerged that Anglo, whose name appeared next to a copyright symbol in some material, had actually retained the rights to the character all along.

Anglo died on 31 October 2011, aged 96.

== Legacy ==
=== Revival ===
Quality Communications founder and publisher Dez Skinn remembered the character fondly and enlisted writer Alan Moore to revive Marvelman for the new anthology comic Warrior, believing the character to be in the public domain. The revived strip debuted in the first issue of Warrior, with the revisionist storyline retconning the 1953–1963 material as simulations experienced by the characters. A one-off Marvelman Special was produced by Quality in 1984, reprinting four Anglo-era strips with a new framing sequence by Moore and artist Alan Davis. However, soon after a variety of factors saw the strip stall, and Warrior ended in January 1985.

The revival was continued by American publisher Eclipse Comics from 1985. Due to objections from Marvel Comics, the title and the character were renamed as Miracleman, with the supporting cast updated accordingly. In a text essay included with Miracleman #2, Moore noted the character's existence since 1953 predated Marvel Comics' use of the name, and instead originated from the rival Fawcett publication.

=== Reprints ===
In addition to the Quality Marvelman Special, several other Anglo-era strips were also reprinted in connection with the revival by Eclipse. "Marvelman and the Invaders from the Future" (originally printed in Marvelman Family #1) was edited and used as a prelude to the updated Moore version of the character, while the remainder of the special's material was released in Stereoscopy as Miracleman 3D #1. When Miracleman #8 was derailed by flooding two further reprints—"Marvelman Combats the Electric Terror" and "Marvelman and the Spanish Armada" (both originally printed in Marvelman #96)—filled the issue, while another was used as a back-up strip in Miracleman #15. Another reprint was used in the 1988 mini-series Miracleman Family. For all of these reprints the names were updated in line with those now used in the main series, and the strips were colourised.

Following the resolution of the protracted ownership debate, Marvel Comics struck a deal with Anglo to license the character shortly after the legal ownership was confirmed in 2009. This allowed the character to return to the Marvelman name, which would be used for reprints of the Anglo-era material (with Miracleman retained for material produced from 1982 onwards), overseen by archivist Derek Wilson.

Marvel's first output featuring the character was the Marvelman Classic Primer, a one-shot of text pieces by John Rhett Thomas, interviews with Anglo and Gaiman and pin-ups by Mike Perkins, Doug Braithwaite, Miguel Angel Sepulveda, Jae Lee, Khoi Pham and Ben Oliver. This was followed by the six-issue limited series Marvelman: Family's Finest, reprinting restored versions of Anglo's strips from Marvelman, Young Marvelman and Marvelman Family. Cover art was produced by Marko Djurdjević and others, with one a modified version of Anglo's cover to Marvelman #33. The series was collected as a trade paperback

Soon afterwards Marvel instigated a series of hardback Marvelman Classic archive collections. The first volume contained Marvelman #25 and #27-34; the reason for the gap was that—despite extensive searches and a Twitter appeal by Tom Brevoort—Marvel were unable to locate any proof that the second appearance of the character in Marvelman #26. A note to this effect was printed in the collecting, relating that some of the collectors contacted had raised doubts the issue existed and that if it was discovered it would be included in future editions. A copy of the issue surfaced in 2014 as the subject of an eBay auction, selling for over £4000 and confirming its publication. As of 2026 no further editions of Marvelman Classic Vol. 1 or any subsequent volumes have been published, but a digital version of the issue is available for purchase on Amazon via ComiXology. After some initial interest, sales of the Marvelman Classic volumes dropped sharply, and none have been issued since 2011.

== Reception ==
Modern reception to the original Marvelman material has been mixed. Writing in the second issue of Eclipse Comics' Miracleman, revival writer Alan Moore noted that the stories were "simplistic in both art and script, and to anyone familiar with the exploits of the original Fawcett Marvel Family the characters must seem woefully derivative", and in 2001 would say "I like the idea of there being a British superhero, I just didn't think he was very good". In a news piece anticipating Marvelman's return in 2010, Douglas Wolk compared the vintage material negatively with the revival, referring to the Miller material as "the sweet, dopey, bland ’50s-era adventures that almost nobody cares about". Reviewing Marvelman: Family's Finest #1, Lew Stringer questioned what the target audience for the reprints was.

== Collected editions ==
Title	ISBN	Release date	Contents
Marvelman Classic Vol. 1	9780785143758	August 2010	Contains material from Marvelman #25 & 27–34
Marvelman Classic Vol. 2	9780785151968	February 2011	Contains material from Marvelman #35–44
Marvelman: Family's Finest	9780785149699	March 2011	Contains material from Marvelman #65, #72–77, #102, #105–106, #108, #159, #222, #228, #235 & #252; Young Marvelman #57, #72, #88, #100, #200 & #202; and Marvelman Family #3, #8–10, #14, #18 & #29–30.
Marvelman Classic Vol. 3	9780785157236	September 2011	Contains material from Marvelman #45–54
