= Garry Leach =

British comics artist and publisher (1954–2022)

- Born: 19 September 1954
- Died: 26 March 2022 (aged 67)
- Areas: Penciller, Inker, Editor, Publisher, Letterer, Colourist
- Notable works: Marvelman
- Awards: "Favourite Single or Continued Story" Eagle Award (1983) "Best Single Issue/Single Story" Eisner Award (1999)

Garry Leach (19 September 1954 – 26 March 2022) was a British comics artist and publisher.

== Biography ==
Garry Leach's early work for 2000 AD included mainly one-off stories featuring Dan Dare and M.A.C.H. 1. He later worked on the series The V.C.s.

In 1981 he joined Dez Skinn's company, Quality Communications where he worked as art director and was the first artist on Alan Moore's revival of Marvelman in Warrior. His work on Marvelman proved highly popular but due to his slow pace of working, he left art duties to be replaced by Alan Davis. For Davis' first few stories Leach worked as inker to allow Davis to settle into the strip. Leach's work on Marvelman remained the prototype, as Davis has insisted that "my ‘style’ on the series was simply a bargain-basement attempt to imitate what Garry had done".

Leach and Alan Moore also created Warpsmith for Warrior together; Warpsmith featured in its own strip and eventually became a supporting character in Marvelman. With Dave Elliott, Leach set up Atomeka Press in 1988. Their first title was the anthology title, A1, which included new Warpsmith material by Moore and Leach.

After Atomeka and A1 finished in the mid-1990s, Leach worked mainly in advertising, but returned to comics in the late 1990s as John McCrea's inker on Hitman. He also drew the first issue of Warren Ellis's series Global Frequency, and designed many of that title's characters. He continued to contribute inking work to 2000 AD, most recently on Future Shorts with Rufus Dayglo.

Leach illustrated cards for the collectible card game Magic: The Gathering.

He returned to publishing and restarted Atomeka Press with Dave Elliott. A1 is being published again with a mix of old and new material, including new work by Leach. The A1 Sketchbook was released in late 2004, containing four Miracleman-related pin-ups (although the pin-ups were not explicitly said to be Miracleman for possible legal reasons). A variant of the sketchbook was produced, featuring a Miracleman front cover and Kid Miracleman back cover by Leach.

== Death ==
In March 2022, 2000AD announced Leach's death. His cause of death was not specified.

== Bibliography ==
Comics work includes:

- Tharg's Future Shocks:
  - "The Juggernaut" (with Hunter Tremayne, in 2000 AD #58, 1978)
  - "Cold Kill" (with Mike Cruden, in 2000 AD #94, 1979)
  - "Easy Kill" (art and script, in 2000 AD #205, 1981)
  - "Bloomin' Cold" (with Kelvin Gosnell, in 2000 AD #215, 1981)
  - "They Sweep the Spaceways" (with Alan Moore, in 2000 AD #219, 1981)
  - "Scrambled Eggs" (with Alan Hebden, in 2000 AD #226, 1981)
- Dan Dare:
  - "The Doomsday Machine" (with Henry Miller (1-3), Nick Landau (4-5) and shared art duties with Trevor Goring, in 2000 AD #79-84, 1978)
  - "Visco" (art and script, in 2000 AD Sci-Fi Special 1978)
- M.A.C.H. 1: "The Taxaco Venture" (with Gary Rice, in 2000 AD 1979 Sci-Fi Special)
- Judge Dredd:
  - "The Day the Law Died" (with John Wagner, in 2000 AD #104, 1979)
  - "Night of the Bloodbeast" (with John Wagner, in 2000 AD #138, 1979)
  - "Attack of the 50 ft. Woman" (with John Wagner/Alan Grant, in 2000 AD # 492, 1986)
  - "The Comeback" (with John Wagner/Alan Grant, in 2000 AD #513, 1987)
  - "Ten Years On" (with John Wagner/Alan Grant, in 2000 AD #520, 1987)
  - "Oz" (with John Wagner/Alan Grant and collaborating on art, as K. Edward, with Will Simpson/Dave Elliott, in 2000 AD #547-548, 1987)
- The V.C.s (with Gerry Finley-Day, in 2000 AD #141, 145, 148-149, 154-155, 161-162, 165 & 168, 1979–1980)
- Marvelman (with Alan Moore, in Warrior # 1-3 & 5-7, 1982)
- Warpsmith (with Alan Moore):
  - "Cold War, Cold Warrior" (in Warrior #9-10, January–May 1983)
  - "Ghostdance" (in A1 #1, 1989, ISBN 1-871878-05-5)
- Zirk (in Warrior #13, 1983)
- Starcom (in Eagle and Battle with Storm Force - toy tie-in 3-D giveaway, issues dated 29th August 1987)
- Hitman #23-30, 32-60 (inks, with writer Garth Ennis and pencils by John McCrea, DC Comics, 1999–2001)
- Global Frequency #1 (art, with writer Warren Ellis, DC comics, 2002)
- Whatever Happened To?: "Tweak" (inks, with Pat Mills and pencils by Chris Weston, in Judge Dredd Megazine #214, 2004)
- Future Shorts: "A Sound of Intergalactic Thunder" (inks, with Al Ewing and pencils by Rufus Dayglo, in 2000 AD #1449, 2005)
- The Twelve #1-6 (inks, with writer J. Michael Straczynski and pencils by Chris Weston, Marvel Comics, March–August 2008)
- Freedom Formula #4-5 (with writer Edmund Shern and pencils by Chris Johnson/Amelia Woo, Radical Comics, 2009)

=== Covers ===
- Dan Dare #2-7 (with Garth Ennis, Virgin Comics, 2007–2008)

== Awards ==
Awards he has won include:

- 1983: "Favourite Single or Continued Story" Eagle Award (British Section), for Marvelman (Warrior #1-3 & 5-6), with Alan Moore
- 1999: "Best Single Issue/Single Story" Eisner Award, for Hitman #34: "Of Thee I Sing", with Garth Ennis and John McCrea,
