= L. Miller & Son, Ltd. =

British publisher

- Founded: 1943
- Founder: Leonard Miller; Arnold Miller
- Defunct: 1966
- Country of origin: United Kingdom
- Headquarters location: London
- Key people: Colin Traver, Mick Anglo, Len Miller, Colin Andrew
- Publication types: Comic magazines, Paperback Books
- Fiction genres: Superheroes, Westerns, Science Fiction, Horror/Suspense, Adventure

L. Miller & Son, Ltd. was a British publisher of magazines, comic books, pulp fiction and paperback books intended primarily to take advantage of the British ban on importing printed matter. Between 1943 and 1966, the firm published British editions of many American comic books, primarily those of Fawcett Comics and American paperback books, primarily those of Fawcett Publications' Gold Medal Books. The company is best known for the 1954 creation of Marvelman – a blatant imitation of the Golden Age Captain Marvel – after America's Fawcett Publications capitulated to National Periodicals (DC Comics). L. Miller & Son also published a large line of Western comics — many reprints but also some original titles - and both category fiction and non-fiction paperbacks.

== History ==
During and directly after World War II, the UK was intent on promoting homegrown publishers, and thus banned the direct importation of American periodicals, including comic books. L. Miller & Son, Ltd. was founded in 1943 by Leonard Miller and his son Arnold L. Miller. To get around the importation ban, from 1945 L. Miller & Son published black-and-white reprints of the Fawcett Comics Marvel Family titles, including Captain Marvel Adventures, Captain Marvel Jr., The Marvel Family, and Whiz Comics.

The company also produced original comics. Between 1950 and 1952, British writer/artist Mick Anglo produced Space Commando Comics, featuring "Space Commander Kerry," for L. Miller & Son, while concurrently producing strips for Len Miller's son Arnold's own Arnold Book Company.

Throughout the 1950s, L. Miller & Son published a large line of Western comics. L. Miller & Son's original Western titles, which they started producing in 1954, included Colorado Kid, Davy Crockett, Kid Dynamite Western Comic, Pancho Villa Western Comic, and Rocky Mountain King Western Comic. Some of the longer-running Western reprint titles included Gabby Hayes Western, Hopalong Cassidy Comic, Lash Larue Western, Monte Hale Western, Rocky Lane Western, Six-Gun Heroes, and Western Hero.

In 1954, the decision on the National Comics Publications, Inc. v. Fawcett Publications, Inc. lawsuit found that Fawcett's Captain Marvel character was an infringement on the copyright of National's Superman character after a long legal battle. The suit resulted in Fawcett Publications canceling all of its superhero-related publications, including those featuring Captain Marvel and related characters. L. Miller & Son was forced to cancel their line of "Marvel" titles (though the company continued to publish Whiz Comics minus any Marvel Family stories).

Faced with the sudden loss of their star feature, and operating under different copyright laws, the company turned to Mick Anglo to come up with a replacement character that, while ostensibly a new creation, mimicked enough core elements of Captain Marvel to retain the interest of readers who had enjoyed the reprints. Anglo (along with writer/publisher Leonard Miller) created Marvelman. Captain Marvel, Jr., was adapted to create Young Marvelman, and Mary Marvel had her gender changed to create the male Kid Marvelman. The magic word "Shazam!" was replaced with "Kimota" ("Atomik" backward). Using the "new" characters, the company launched three titles, Marvelman, Marvelman Family, and Young Marvelman.

In 1959, the ban on the importation of foreign comics was lifted. American comics became much more widely available in the U.K., and demand for British-produced comics shrunk. By the end of the 1950s, L. Miller & Son had canceled all their Western titles. In the same vein, Miller canceled Marvelman Family, and turned both Marvelman and Young Marvelman into reprint books. Both titles struggled on, each putting out 346 issues, but both were finally canceled in 1963. (Marvelman — now called Miracleman — was revived in 1982 in a dark, post-modern reboot by writer Alan Moore, with later contributions by Neil Gaiman.)

Meanwhile, Leonard Miller's son Arnold's operation, Arnold Book Company, had been essentially forced out of business by a British backlash against the gory American horror comics it was reprinting. Arnold moved into film production, directing a series of nudist films beginning in 1959. Leonard was against his son's new career, and as a result of their dispute, he ejected Arnold from L. Miller & Son, which became simply L. Miller & Co.

Ironically, starting in 1961, L. Miller & Co. itself moved into the horror/suspense genre with two new titles, Mystic and Spellbound, both of which culled pre-Comics Code material from American publishers like Atlas, Marvel Comics, American Comics Group, Charlton, and E.C. Comics.

L. Miller & Co. declared bankruptcy in 1963, and ceased comic book publication in 1966. The physical asbestos printing plates from which Miller had produced their comics, and presumably the rights to the comics as well, were sold to fellow black-and-white British publisher Alan Class, Ltd. Class, for his part, was interested primarily in horror and science fiction stories, and reprinted few of the original Miller creations. (Class was still using some of the Miller printing plates as recently as the late 1990s.)

== Titles published (selected) ==
=== Superheroes ===
- Captain Midnight (3 vols., 1946, 1950–1953, 1962–1963) – Fawcett reprints
- Marvel Family – Fawcett reprints
  - Captain Marvel Adventures (3 vols., 79 issues, 1946–1954)
  - Captain Marvel Jr. (3 vols., 68 issues, 1945–1954)
  - The Marvel Family (2 vols., 43 issues, 1949–1953)
  - Whiz Comics (3 vols., 95 issues, 1945–1946, 1950–1959)
- Marvelman Family – original stories (reprints from own archives after 1959)
  - Marvelman (346 issues, 1954–1963)
  - Marvelman Family (30 issues, 1956–1959)
  - Young Marvelman (346 issues, 1954–1963)
- Master Comics (3 vols., 98 issues, 1945, 1946, 1950–1959) – Fawcett reprints

=== Westerns ===
- Original titles
  - Buffalo Bill Cody (19 issues, 1957–1959)
  - Colorado Kid (18 issues, 1954–1959)
  - Davy Crockett (50 issues, 1956–1960)
  - Kid Dynamite Western Comic (65 issues, 1954–1960)
  - Pancho Villa Western Comic (63 issues, 1954–1959) – mostly by Colin Andrew
  - Rocky Mountain King Western Comic (65 issues, 1955–1959)
- Reprint titles
  - Annie Oakley (17 issues, 1957–1958) – Atlas reprints
  - Cowboy Action (18 issues, 1956–1957) – Atlas reprints
  - Gabby Hayes Western (62 issues, 1951–1955) – Fawcett reprints
  - Hopalong Cassidy Comic (3 vols., 106 issues, 1948–1958) – Fawcett reprints
  - Lash Larue Western (76 issues, 1950–1959) – Fawcett reprints
  - Monte Hale Western (2 vols., 70 issues, 1950–1959) – Fawcett reprints
  - Rocky Lane Western (90 issues, 1950–1959) – Fawcett reprints
  - Sergeant O'Brien (42 issues, 1952–1956) – reprints from a French source
  - Six-Gun Heroes (65 issues, 1955–1959) – Fawcett & Charlton reprints
  - Tex Ritter Western (50 issues, 1951–1959) – Fawcett reprints
  - Tom Mix Western Comic (4 vols., 88 issues, 1945, 1946, 1948, 1951–1958) – Fawcett & Charlton reprints
  - Two Gun Kid (38 issues, 1951–1958) – Atlas reprints
  - Western Hero (100 issues, 1950–1959) – Fawcett & Charlton reprints
  - Wyatt Earp (44 issues, 1957–1960) – Atlas & Charlton reprints

=== Other ===
- Don Winslow of the Navy (3 vols., 63 issues, 1947, 1951–1953) – Fawcett reprints
- Family Favourites Comic Weekly (34 issues, 1954) – original stories
- Mystic (66 issues, 1961–1966) – horror/suspense reprints from Atlas, Marvel Comics, American Comics Group, Charlton, and E.C. Comics
- Nyoka the Jungle Girl (2 vols, 69 issues, 1950–1959) – Fawcett reprints
- Pango (36 issues, 1953–1956) – reprints from a French source
- Popeye (30 issues, 1959–1963) – King Features reprints
- Robin Hood Tales (34 issues, 1957–1959) – Reprints from National Periodicals and Charlton Comics. Some original British material.
- Spellbound (66 issues, 1961–1966) – horror/suspense reprints from Atlas, Marvel Comics, American Comics Group, Charlton, and E.C. Comics
- Zorro (38 issues, 1952–1954) – reprints possibly from a French source
