= Quality Communications =

British publishing company

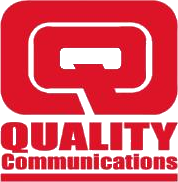
- Status: defunct, c. 2008
- Founded: 1982
- Founder: Dez Skinn
- Country of origin: United Kingdom
- Headquarters location: 3 Lewisham Way; London
- Publication types: Comic magazines, Magazines
- Fiction genres: Superheroes, Science fiction, Horror

Quality Communications was a British publishing company founded by Dez Skinn that operated from 1982 to c. 2008. The company's most notable publications were the monthly comics anthology Warrior, which featured early work by writer Alan Moore; and the comics trade magazine Comics International, which Skinn published and edited for 16 years. Quality was involved with comics in both the UK and the U.S., mainly with reprint material from Warrior and repackaging 2000 AD material for the U.S. market.

== History ==
Quality was initially formed to publish Warrior, which featured the Alan Moore stories V for Vendetta and Marvelman. Warrior won 17 Eagle Awards during its short run (including nine Eagles in 1983 alone). Quality was also involved in the U.S. completion of Marvelman and V for Vendetta.

Quality's main period as a comics publisher was from 1982 to 1988. 2000 AD content repackaged for the U.S. market included the titles 2000 A.D. Presents, Spellbinders, and Scavengers. During this period, Quality also published 7 issues of Halls of Horror, a title Skinn had originated earlier with Thorpe & Porter (the British publishing division of Warner Communications).

In 1990, Quality shifted focus to magazines, launched the comics trade journal Comics International, which Skinn published and edited for the following 16 years. His "Sez Dez" column was a regular feature in issues #100–#200. With issue #200, in 2006, Skinn sold the magazine to Cosmic Publications. (Comics International struggled along for another couple of years before folding in 2010.)

Quality published a few sporadic titles in the 2000s, including Toy Max (2003), a one-off magazine for toy collectors, and Skinn's hardcover book Comix: The Underground Revolution (2004). In 2005, Quality published Ace Comics, an anthology of ten comic strips by City College Brighton & Hove students of Skinn's; it was distributed for free in East Sussex.

In 2008, Quality Communications published the 15th-anniversary issue (numbered #15) of Jack Kirby Quarterly.

== Titles published ==
=== Comics ===
- 2000 A.D. Presents (20 issues, Aug. 1986–May 1988) — reprinting classic stories from 2000 AD (license acquired from Eagle Comics; later continued by Fleetway Publications)
- Ace Comics (1 issue, July 2005)
- Fighting Figurines (1 issue, 1996) — by Paul Honeyford and Dave Heaven, collecting the story originally anthologized in Revolver
- Halls of Horror Dracula Comics Special (1 issue, Apr. 1984)
- Marvelman Special (1 issue, 1984)
- Scavengers (14 issues, Dec. 1987–Jan. 1989) — reprinting dinosaur-themed stories from 2000 AD
- Spellbinders (12 issues, Dec. 1986–Dec. 1987) — reprinting stories with a magic/horror twist:
  - Sláine and Nemesis the Warlock from 2000 AD
  - Cursitor Doom/Amadeus Wolf from Smash!
  - "Library of Death" stories from Scream!
- Steel Claw (4-issue limited series, Dec. 1986– Mar. 1987) — by Kenneth Bulmer, Garry Leach, and Jesús Blasco; colourized reprints of Steel Claw stories from the IPC Magazines title Valiant
- Storm: The Deep World (1 issue, 1982) — by Saul Dunn and Don Lawrence; reprinting De diepe wereld (originally serialized in Eppo magazine, Oberon, 1977)
- Warrior (26 issues, Mar. 1982–Feb. 1985)
  - Warrior Summer Special (1 issue, 1983)

=== Magazines ===
- Comics International (200 issues, 1990–2006)
- Halls of Horror (7 issues, 1982–1984) — acquired from G.B.D. Ltd./Top Sellers Ltd (imprints of Thorpe & Porter) (Warner Communications) with issue #24; previously known as House of Hammer, Hammer's House of Horror, and Hammer's Halls of Horror
- Jack Kirby Quarterly #15 (1 issue, 2008) — 15th-anniversary issue
- Toy Max (1 issue, June 2003) — edited by pop culture expert Tim Pilcher

=== Books ===
- Comix: The Underground Revolution (2004) — by Dez Skinn
