= Heritage coast =

Protected area of coastline in the UK

A heritage coast is a strip of coastline in England and Wales, the extent of which is defined by agreement between the relevant statutory national agency and the relevant local authority. Such areas are recognised for their natural beauty, wildlife and heritage and amongst the purposes of definition is support for these qualities and enabling enjoyment of them by the public. For England this national agency is Natural England (having formerly been the Countryside Agency) and for Wales it is Natural Resources Wales (which took over the role from its predecessor body, Countryside Council for Wales).

== Designated coastline ==
1,057 km of the English coastline and 495 km of the Welsh coastline, in both cases approximately one-third of the total length, have been defined as heritage coast. The goal is to conserve their natural beauty and improve accessibility for visitors.

Unlike national parks and Areas of Outstanding Natural Beauty (AONBs), the heritage coast designation is non-statutory, and designations can only be made with the agreement of local authorities and landowners. However, the majority of heritage coast falls within statutorily designated landscapes such as national parks, AONBs and the Jurassic Coast World Heritage Site. These coincident designations are listed in the fourth column of the tables below. Designations for nature conservation (as opposed to landscape, e.g. SSSI, Special Area of Conservation and Special Protection Area) of parts of Heritage Coasts are too numerous and complex to easily list here.

The southern coast of Wales and Devon and Cornwall in south west England have more heritage coastline per mile than other regions, including over 50% of the coast between Cardiff and St Davids, about 55-60% of Cornwall's coast, and around 60-65% of Devon's coast. This contrasts with the coasts of North West England, where St Bees Head is the only heritage coast, or the south-east stretch of the English Channel which has only very sporadic stretches.

The first heritage coast was Beachy Head with its famous white cliffs.

== List of heritage coasts ==
=== England ===
Heritage coasts listed clockwise around the English coast from Northumberland:

Heritage coast name	County (or equivalent)	Defined length	Coincident designations
Northumberland	Northumberland		
Durham	Durham		None
North Yorkshire and Cleveland	North Yorkshire, Redcar and Cleveland		Mostly within North York Moors National Park
Flamborough Headland	East Riding of Yorkshire		None
Spurn	East Riding of Yorkshire	5.5 kilometres (3.4 mi)	
North Norfolk	Norfolk		
Suffolk	Suffolk		
South Foreland	Kent		
Dover-Folkestone	Kent		
Sussex	Sussex		South Downs National Park
Tennyson	Isle of Wight		Isle of Wight AONB
Hamstead	Isle of Wight		Isle of Wight AONB
Purbeck	Dorset		Dorset AONB, Jurassic Coast World Heritage Site
	Dorset		Dorset AONB, Jurassic Coast World Heritage Site
East Devon	Devon		East Devon AONB, Jurassic Coast World Heritage Site
South Devon	Devon		
Rame Head	Cornwall	7.6 km	
Gribbin Head-Polperro	Cornwall	24 km	South Devon AONB
The Roseland	Cornwall	54.2 km	
The Lizard	Cornwall	27 km	
Isles of Scilly	Isles of Scilly		Isles of Scilly National Landscape
Penwith	Cornwall	54 km	
Godrevy-Portreath	Cornwall	9 km	
St Agnes	Cornwall	11 km	
Trevose Head	Cornwall	4 km	
Pentire Point-Widemouth	Cornwall	52 km	
Hartland	Cornwall	11 km	
Hartland (Devon)	Devon	37 km	
Lundy	Devon		None
North Devon	Devon		North Devon AONB
Exmoor	Somerset		
St. Bees Head	Cumbria		

=== Wales ===
Heritage coasts listed clockwise around Welsh coast from southeast:

Heritage coast name	Unitary authority area(s)	Defined length	Coincident designations
Glamorgan	Vale of Glamorgan, Bridgend	21.7 km	
Gower	Swansea	55 km	Gower AONB
South Pembrokeshire	Pembrokeshire	66.0 km	National Park
Marloes and Dale	Pembrokeshire	43.3 km	National Park
St Brides Bay	Pembrokeshire	8.0 km	National Park
St Davids Peninsula	Pembrokeshire	82.0 km	National Park
Dinas Head	Pembrokeshire	17.7 km	National Park
St Dogmaels and Moylgrove	Pembrokeshire	22.5 km	National Park
Ceredigion	Ceredigion	33.8 km	
Llŷn	Gwynedd	88.3 km	Llŷn AONB
Aberffraw Bay	Isle of Anglesey	7.7 km	Anglesey AONB
Holyhead Mountain	Isle of Anglesey	12.9 km	Anglesey AONB
North Anglesey	Isle of Anglesey	28.6 km	Anglesey AONB
Great Orme	Conwy	7.1 km	
