= List of Miracleman characters =

The following is a list of characters from the comic book series Miracleman.

== Superhumans ==
=== Miracleman ===
The first of the Miracleman Family, created by Doctor Gargunza in 1954 as a Cold War weapons project based on the orphan Mike Moran. Believed killed in 1963, he returns in 1982 and three years later undertakes a benevolent takeover of Earth with his allies, turning the planet into a utopia.

=== Young Miracleman ===
The second of the Miracleman Family, based on the orphan Dicky Dauntless. He is killed by the British government in 1963, but resurrected by Miracleman in 2003.

=== Kid Miracleman ===
The third of the Miracleman Family, based on the orphan Johnny Bates. He escapes destruction in 1963 and spends the next 19 years as the most powerful creature on Earth, becoming corrupted and attempting to kill Miracleman on his return in 1982. After three years trapped inside Bates, Kid Miracleman breaks lose again in 1985 and lays waste to London before being stopped by Miracleman and his allies.

=== Miraclewoman ===
An unsanctioned experiment undertaken by Gargunza, based on the orphan Avril Lear. She escapes Gargunza's attentions, changes her identity and lays low until Qys agents visit Earth. She then allies with Miracleman and becomes his lover as they create a golden age on Earth.

=== Young Nastyman ===
==== Publication history ====
Young Nastyman was originally created by Mick Anglo in 1954 as a recurring villain in the pages of Young Marvelman, debuting in issue #57 and reappearing intermittently. In these stories his origin was as Pontag of Victo; the Terence Rebbeck identity and backstory was devised by Alan Moore for the revival.

==== Fictional character biography ====
Like Mike Moran, Dicky Dauntless and Jonathan Bates, Terence Rebbeck was the orphan of RAF personnel and was kidnapped by Doctor Gargunza. Unlike them, his abduction was unknown to Spookshow and he was instead kept at a private laboratory by Gargunza along with Avril Lear and Pluto. There a superhuman clone was created of him, which Gargunza programmed as the villain Young Nastyman. Young Nastyman was used in dreams as an archenemy of the Miracleman Family, believing himself to be an alien youth named Pontag given a magical elixir by a hermit called Nastyman that turned him into a supervillain. However, Gargunza enjoyed vicariously living the life of a supervillain and - without the oversight of Sir Dennis Archer - his perversions were reflected in Rebbeck being the protagonist of increasingly violent and sexual scenarios. The continuity of the dreams eventually broke down, causing Young Nastyman to wake up in the real world. Unable to tell the real world from his consequence-free simulations, Young Nastyman promptly embarks on a rampage. To prevent Archer finding out the truth, Gargunza sends Miraclewoman after him. However, she instead finds the Project Zarathustra bunker and learns her true nature. Wanting freedom she tracked Young Nastyman to Iceland and tried to tell him what she had learnt in the hope that he would join her. Far beyond reason, he attacks her, with the two fighting until Young Nastyman is incinerated in a volcano.

=== Big Ben ===
==== Publication history ====
Big Ben was originally devised by Dez Skinn some time before the 1982 incarnation of Warrior came into being. As a planned member of Challenger Force (a proposed super-team made up of Warrior characters) he appeared on the cover of Warrior #4 before debuting in the Marvelman strip in #10, dated April/May 1983. Following his guest appearance in the Marvelman strip, a story written by Skinn (under the pseudonym Edgar Henry) and drawn by Ian Gibson was included in the Marvelman Special in 1984, framed as one of the para-reality simulations. This story, "Big Ben versus King Arthur", had been made some years before. "The Man with No Time for Crime" then appeared in Warrior in standalone strips in Warrior again written by Skinn (this time under his own name) and drawn by Will Simpson. The Big Ben section of the Marvelman Special was omitted from Eclipse and Marvel's reprint programmes.

==== Fictional character biography ====
The product of the second iteration of Project Zarathustra, Big Ben was created in 1968, using an unknown subject. While the project resulted in enhanced strength and flight capability without Gargunza's input, the result was nowhere near as powerful as the Miracleman Family; due to their crucially poor understanding of the para-reality programming, it drove Big Ben to insanity. Despite these shortcomings, Big Ben was at least controllable and was retained by Spookshow as part of Sir Dennis Archer's hope to recoup some of the project's funding. Big Ben's programming convinced him he was a member of the Bulldog Brigade, a patriotic British superteam.

When Miracleman and Cream locate the Project Zarathustra bunker, Archer uses Big Ben as a last line of defence, telling him the former is a Communist supervillain called Major Molotov. Miracleman is perplexed by the resulting confrontation, instantly recognising that his opponent is neither a physical threat or in his right mind, though he eventually bats Big Ben aside out of irritation. Despite his injuries, Big Ben is able to stagger into the bunker and witness the truth of his creation. Big Ben is later recovered by Spookshow, believing that the evidence of his creation was merely a ploy by Molotov and that he was able to fight a successful delaying action, and oblivious that he is being returned to an asylum.

Big Ben is initially undetected by the Qys as he does not appear to use infra-space, but his mental condition is initially too severe for recovery. However, after Miracleman comes to power, he works with the Qys to dovetail Big Ben's perceptions with reality until he is able to return to society. He decides to take on the identity of British Bulldog and joins the other superhumans at Olympus, and becomes a respected hero.

=== Winter ===
The first of Miracleman's children, Winter was conceived with Liz on the night of his rebirth. Even while in the womb, she exhibits advanced levels of power, being able to keep her mother calm even when she is taken by Gargunza close to birth, and looking straight at the scientist during a scan of her pregnant mother. After meeting a revived Gargunza, she implies that even then she would have been powerful enough to prevent him from taking over her body. Miracleman is able to deliver her successfully on October 29, 1982, though she stuns both her parents by saying "ma-ma" mere moments later. Winter then takes control of Liz's moods as she rapidly develops. She implants her desired name in her mother's mind, swiftly exhausts her supply of breast milk, moves onto solids in a matter of weeks and even develops teeth. When Liz takes a few days to visit her sister in Yarmouth, Winter makes the full scope of her developing intelligence clear to Miracleman. While powerful and kind, Winter has at this point already evolved much further than the adult superhumans and leaves Earth to visit Qys.

When Winter returns at the end of 1988, her father has turned Earth into a utopia, something the super-intelligent child is barely impressed by, describing it as a redecoration. Miracleman also begins donating his sperm to anyone who wants superhuman offspring of their own; while Earth soon has many of the advanced babies, Winter is revered as the first. A storybook based on her adventures called Winter's Tale is hugely popular and her birthday becomes Wintersday, an annual festival where children can choose to do anything they want. She continues to visit Earth, including meeting the revived Gargunza in 1993 and being present for the resurrection of Young Miracleman in 2003.

=== Huey Moon ===
==== Publication history ====
The concept of Firedrakes was another devised by Moore early in the development of the Warrior universe, and a character bearing that name was planned as a member of Challenger Force. As such the name is referred to as an ally of Marvelman and 'Warpsmith' in "The Yesterday Gambit" story from Warrior #4, set three years into the fictional universe's future.

==== Fictional character biography ====
Huey Moon is a firedrake from Earth. Firedrakes are genetic mutants that create fire early in many species' development; once the civilisation is established the genes usually become recessive, though occasionally throwbacks continue. As these throwbacks can be capable of turning stars supernova, they are monitored by the Qys and Warpsmiths; a sweep of Earth in 1948 was the reason for the Qys ship's visit to Earth in 1948, leading to its crash and recovery by Spookshow. Moon is located in 1983 by Miracleman; due to his abilities, he has been rejected by society and lives in a Philadelphia junkyard. After some initial hesitation he allies with the group. He can cause anything in his vision to immediately catch fire, and is fireproof himself. Moon is present when the group confronts Kid Miracleman in London, and is able to use his abilities to make various objects explode to keep the enemy off-balance until Miracleman and Aza Chorn deal with him. Following the superhumans' ascension, Moon takes on the task of providing energy for the world, using his powers to tap into geothermal power sources while also overseeing wind farms, solar energy satellites and other renewable energy sources. He subsequently remains at Olympus, and uses his abilities to trigger a huge pyrotechnic display at the 1993 London carnival. He is also present at the rebirth of Young Miracleman.

=== Mist ===
Birthed by Rachel Cohn using Miracleman's sperm, Mist is a superpowered baby. Like Winter, while she is pleasant her high intelligence and confident persona can make interacting with her unnerving, especially as Mist's abilities are in great contrast to her stepbrother Glenn. Her abilities allow her to realise her stepfather Jack is leaving Rachel for his mistress in Japan, something she tactlessly tells her mother. Following the 1993 London Carnival, Mist and her fellow superpowered children set off with Winter on a sojourn into space, and she is unable to see why this upsets her mother. Several years later she allows herself to be aged to the appearance of a teenager, and witnesses the return of Young Miracleman.

== Humans ==
=== Liz Moran ===
==== Publication history ====
Moore's original proposal placed Liz and Mike's first meeting was in 1962, shortly after his recovery and when she was working as a temporary typist in the same Fleet Street newspaper where he was a staff writer; their marriage was dated to March 1965, taking place at a registry office. At this stage in development her maiden name was O'Rourke. Artist Garry Leach modelled her appearance on actress Audrey Hepburn.

==== Fictional character biography ====
Born Elizabeth Sullivan, Liz has been married to Mike Moran for sixteen years by 1982. She is 36 at the time and very much in love with her husband despite the pair being unable to have children. Liz's career as a professional illustrator covers the majority of their living expenses, something she does not mind but which Mike feels guilty about. Following Miracleman's return she immediately realises there must be some truth to what he says, though she reacts with disbelief much of his purported origin. However she becomes convinced that the story is at least partially true and spends the night with Miracleman. The following day she and Mike visit Johnny Bates, CEO of Sunburst Cybernetics. However they find he is still actually the superhuman Kid Miracleman, and attacks them when Mike realises. Miracleman attempts to fend his former ally off, with limited success. They eventually escape only when Kid Miracleman accidentally says his change-word and returns to being the juvenile Bates.

Despite being shaken by the encounter she helps Mike and Miracleman find out more about themselves, buying a stack of comics to help research and accompanying them to Dartmoor to carry out tests. She also breaks it to Mike that she is pregnant with Miracleman's baby. The following weeks are difficult as Mike struggles with his growing insecurities, while Liz worries that the baby will be abnormal. She also develops a growing awareness of the danger Miracleman presents to them after Mike only avoids death at the hands of Evelyn Cream due to the latter deciding to disobey his orders. Just before the baby is due she is kidnapped by Gargunza and taken to Paraguay. She largely takes this situation with calm, and even asks Gargunza about his history - though she is stunned when he finally tells her of his aim of implanting his consciousness in the baby's body. Despite Gargunza temporarily reverting him to Mike, Miracleman is able to free her and take her to more pleasant surroundings. After Miracleman delivers the baby they are both stunned when it utters "ma-ma" moments later.

Following Winter's birth, Liz's mental wellbeing rapidly unravels both due to her daughter controlling her moods and the ongoing drama Miracleman brings to their lives. While the former means she does not baulk when feeding Winter solids within weeks of her birth, the latter finally gets too much for her after the Qys and Warpsmiths come into their lives. Despite still loving both Mike and Miracleman she goes to stay with her sister in Yarmouth, after which her growing awareness that Winter is influencing her leads her to move out permanently.

By the time Liz is next seen, Mike has effectively committed suicide, London has been devastated by Kid Miracleman, and Miracleman has seized control of Earth before publicly making love to Miraclewoman. He visits her in Yarmouth and offers to move her up the list for superhuman augmentation and offers her a place in Olympus. She reacts with scorn, denouncing his loss of humanity, and tells him not to visit her again. Miracleman is perplexed but bothered by her attitude.

=== Doctor Emil Gargunza ===
==== Publication history ====
Doctor Gargunza began life as a modified version of Captain Marvel archenemy Doctor Sivana, with the name inspired by an insulting nickname Mick Anglo was called by his brother. He was a frequent recurring villain in both Marvelman and Marvelman Family, and was presented largely as a stock mad scientist. In the original material he also had a nephew called Young Gargunza who largely fulfilled a similar role in the pages of Young Marvelman. As of 2026 it has yet to be revealed that either fictional or non-fictional versions of Young Gargunza exist within the revival's universe. During the early planning for the mooted planned Warrior combined universe, Gargunza was also going to be revealed as the creator of the Fate computer seen in V for Vendetta, but this development was dropped before either story addressed the issue.

==== Fictional character biography ====
Emil Gargunza was born in Vera Cruz, Mexico in 1910. A few years later, his family fled to Rio during the upheaval of the Mexican Revolution. His father died in 1919 and, in order to support his mother, Gargunza began to work for a local gang-leader called Aurelio who adopted him as a mascot. However, Gargunza's high IQ meant he was soon more important to the gang than Aurelio. When the latter attempted to molest Gargunza the gang restrained their former leader, and Aurelio was forced to watch Gargunza rape his woman before the 14-year old beat him to death with a baseball bat. Over the next four years he earned enough from the underworld to ensure the comfort of his mother and in 1928 travelled to Europe. There he met Martin Heidegger and then Adolf Hitler. His intelligence saw him gain a post in the Nazis' genetic research programme in 1934, but in 1941 he defected to the Allies. As he brought information on the V-2 rocket, RAF intelligence welcomed him with open arms, assigning him to Spookshow under Sir Dennis Archer. In 1947 his mother died; perceiving mortality for the first time he resolved to never die. The following year, a Qys scout ship crashed in Wiltshire and was recovered by Spookshow. The aliens' body-swapping technology gave Gargunza the means to achieve his dream of immortality, which he gleaned information on while devising the Miracleman Family for Spookshow - being inspired to base them around superheroes after finding an issue of Captain Marvel Adventures. Gargunza thus devised Miracleman, Young Miracleman and Kid Miracleman for the government - while also diverting funds to his own secret laboratory where he worked on Miraclewoman, Young Nastyman and Miracledog. Young Nastyman and then Miraclewoman escaped his control. In 1961, Gargunza absconded to South America with Miracledog before he could be discovered.

During his research, Gargunza discovered he was too old for a clone body of himself to be made, and that implanting his mind in a grown superhuman would likely lead to their adult personality engulfing his. Instead, he planned to take over the body of a superhuman's offspring. After his plan to breed Miracleman and Miraclewoman was undone he settled on assigning agents to watch the Morans, and when Liz became pregnant had her abducted and brought to Paraguay. Miracleman and Evelyn Cream arrived to recover her but Gargunza had implanted an overriding post-hypnotic keyword in his progeny after an incident where the group nearly awoke in 1961. As such he was able to revert Miracleman to Mike Moran for an hour, and set Miracledog on them. However, while Cream was killed, Moran was able to survive, and after the hour returned as Miracleman. The superhuman massacred his guards before lifting Gargunza into Earth's atmosphere. Miracleman throws Gargunza back towards Earth, with Gargunza burning up until only his pelvis remains.

=== Sir Dennis Archer ===
A hereditary peer who is the controller of Spookshow and thus Project Zarathustra. He oversees Gargunza's work on the Miracleman Family, though the scientist is contemptuous of Archer's personality and intellect. Gargunza is able to funnel Spookshow funds into a secret project for years and escape to Paraguay with much of his research in 1963 before Archer found out. Realising the Miracleman Family will be too hard to control without Gargunza, he greenlights Operation Dragonslayer, which seemingly destroys the trio. In 1968, Archer tried to put the research to use on creating a new superhuman weapon. However, due to the incomplete records of the process, the result - Big Ben - was neither as powerful as the Miracleman Family or as well conditioned, ending up insane.

In 1982, Archer learns of the survival of Miracleman and Kid Miracleman when the pair fight in London. As such, he hires the assassin Evelyn Cream to find and kill Miracleman's human form. While Cream finds Moran, he instead decides to form an alliance with Miracleman, and despite Archer's defensive measures the pair are able to get inside the Project Zarathustra bunker. Archer offers his resignation in the aftermath of the fiasco, and is warned off further investigation by Cream. After Kid Miracleman again returns and lays waste to London in 1985, Archer is found to have killed himself.

=== Evelyn Cream ===
A skilled and highly intelligent contract killer, educated at Rugby and Sandhurst. He enjoys a successful career and acquires a host of accoutrements, including sapphire teeth. He is hired by Dennis Archer to track down Miracleman's human counterpart and kill him. Cream ultimately decides to turn against Archer and form a mutually beneficial alliance with Miracleman.

While Cream outwardly claims to be interested in the financial and political gains his association with Miracleman can bring, he privately worries he has instead fallen under the superhuman's thrall, and begins suffering portentous nightmares. After Liz is kidnapped, Miracleman calls upon Cream for aid. Using his skills, Cream identifies Gargunza as the culprit, and the pair set off to Paraguay to mount a rescue. However, after they arrive Gargunza uses a post-hypnotic command to forcibly revert Miracleman to Moran, and sets Miracledog to hunt the pair. Cream is soon overtaken and killed by the creature. After Miracleman rebuilds the world, his ally Mors recovers Cream's soul and places it in a new artificial body.

=== Jason Oakey ===
Fearful of nuclear war, the nine-year old Jason keeps a stash of resources in a tree in Epping Forest. He is teased at school by one Gary Watts, who calls him "Annie Oakley". Checking his supplies, he meets Miracleman. While Jason is initially sceptical of Miracleman's sexuality and power, a demonstration soon convinces him and the boy asks Miracleman to protect them from any nuclear war, with Miracleman promising to do his best before leaving. Jason subsequently becomes friends with Garry and two other friends called Dave and Sharon, frequently joining them on trips to West End London market stalls. However, while he had planned to do so in August 1985, he and his sister Stephanie were instead sent to stay with their aunt Millie in Hawking-on-Sea. This unwittingly saved his life from Kid Miracleman; Sharon and Dave were killed but never identified, while Garry was impaled on a church weather vane. After Miracleman's rise to power he told no one of their meeting, worried it would be misinterpreted as an attempt to make himself look important. He eventually tells a lover from Nepal he finds through Miraclewoman's match-making service, shortly after losing his virginity to them. Jason later visits the London carnival, where he and his partner trade t-shirts of the Miracleman family with others.

=== Trish ===
A nurse at St. Crispin's Hospital in London. She takes care of the catatonic Johnny Bates, following the first battle between Miracleman and Kid Miracleman in 1983. Trish is kind and encouraging to the boy and continues to look after him after Bates reawakens. She is unknowingly subjected to numerous demeaning sexual remarks by Kid Miracleman during his mental torment of Bates. While Trish tries to coax Johnny into speaking of his mental problems and continues to support him she is unable to prevent the boy from being bullied, something that leads to the return of Kid Miracleman. After butchering the tormentors, he considers sparing Trish due to the kindness she showed him; however, he ultimately decides this would "make them think" he had gone soft, and punches the top of her head through a wall.

== Aliens ==
=== Qys Imperium ===
A huge galactic empire, existing for thousands of years and one of the lead powers in Intelligent Space. The source of their strength is a complete mastery of body-swapping technology; the Qys maintain a gigantic number of alternate bodies in Underspace, which they can switch between with change-words. The Qys effectively use Underspace as a wardrobe and have used genetic engineering to create bodies optimised for a wide number of purposes. The Imperium is ruled by the Kingqueen, which inhabits an invulnerable, highly intelligent body. The Qys' abilities are matched by the Warpsmiths' speed; as a result while the Qys Imperium and the Gulf Worlds Confederacy are sworn enemies they have sent over 11,000 years in a tense cold war to avoid wiping each other out. As such they pursue practices to ensure their mutual preservation, such as investigating Firedrake activity. The Qys scout-ship Gla is on a Firedrake sweep of Earth when it suffers a catastrophic failure and crashes in Wiltshire on 18 March 1948. Their body-swapping technology is reverse-engineered by Emil Gargunza to create the Miracleman Family. However, the Qys sent a pair of envoys to Earth in 1982 to investigate the "cuckoos" due to their encroachment on Underspace (named Infra-Space by Gargunza). The agents are initially tasked with destroying Gargunza's creations, and attack both Miraclewoman and Miracleman. However, as the Qys themselves are sterile, they rapidly change their plans on discovering Winter's birth and instead agree to introduce Earth to Intelligent Space. Miracleman and Miraclewoman are nominated to represent the Qys Empire in the alliance.

==== Mors ====
Mors is a Qys scientist assigned to Earth following Miracleman's ascension, arriving in June 1987. He creates an underworld below Olympus, where he is able to capture the souls of the recently deceased and place them in new artificial bodies - including Andy Warhol, Truman Capote, John Belushi, Salvador Dalí, Divine, and Evelyn Cream. He initially can only reach those who died in the previous 18 months, but works to extend his range. The subjects require a sustaining field to survive, and portable versions are awarded sparingly. Mors also makes repeated attempts to bring back a less dangerous version of Emil Gargunza, without success. Later his skills are called upon to help resurrect Young Miracleman.

=== Warpsmiths ===
==== Fictional species biography ====
Originating from the planet Hod, the Warpsmiths are the guardians of the Gulf World Confederacy. Their empire is opposed by the Qys Imperium; due to the size and power of both by the late 20th century they have been locked in a cold war for eleven thousand years. While the blocs are bitter enemies both realise open conflict would result in mutual destruction. The Warpsmiths' power comes from advanced derma-circuitry that allows them to instantaneously transport anything across vast locations; this skill can also be weaponised, either to instantly separate an opponent into pieces or by warping objects into their body to cause lethal injuries. This requires seemingly complex gestures, though a practiced Warpsmith can do so faster than can be observed by the naked eye. As with the Qys, the Warpsmiths maintain an uneasy, distrustful peace with the Rhodru Makers. Among the worlds they oversee are Carbeau (where their influence is a source of major discontent among the population), Sauk and Hiularisq. Warpsmiths have light grey or white skin, hair on their heads and at the base of their spines, with the males having further hair on their areola; the males largely wear their hair in short ponytails, covered by helmets, whereas females are bare headed. The Warpsmiths live in six-sided bisexual clusters, each consisting of three male cluster-husbands and three female cluster-wives. The only thing that seemingly worries the ruling Black Warpsmiths is the Whisper, a mysterious something on the edge of the universe.

They first come into contact with Earth in November 1982, when Qys envoys locate the superhumans Miracleman and Miraclewoman. The successful birth of Miracleman's daughter Winter is judged to make them worthy of introduction to 'Intelligent Space'. As a result, the warrior-class Aza Chorn and Phon Mooda are assigned represent the Gulf World Confederacy, and build an observation post behind Earth's moon where they will liaise with Miracleman, Miraclewoman and the Huey Moon. Normally communicating via sign language, they swiftly learn English to speak to their new allies, which Miracleman notes they speak with perfect BBC intonation. After two years this arrangement is disturbed by the return of Kid Miracleman. The two Warpsmiths help in the battle; while Aza Chorn is able to eventually contain their adversary he is killed in the process. The trio of humans attend his funeral at the observation post, where the remaining members of his cluster have an orgy in remembrance in accordance with Warpsmith culture. Kana Blur of the same cluster then takes Aza Chorn's place as Earth emissary. With their existence now known, the Warpsmiths and their human allies take benevolent control of the planet, turning it into a utopia.

Warpsmiths become popular figures on Earth as cultural envoys and couriers, finding particular common ground with the Japanese. However it is unclear what the Black Warpsmiths' ultimate goal is as Phon Mooda is reporting the birth rates of superhumans back to them, and they concur that the 'experiment' may be close to running its course.

==== Black Warpsmiths ====
Warpsmith society is overseen by the Black Warpsmiths, a trio of seemingly immobile brothers who monitor the worlds that make up their empire and constantly test their forces against potential threats from their enemies. There were originally four Black Warpsmiths but at some point they were reduced to three. They create Warpsmiths in various classes - white Warpsmiths are warriors, grey Warpsmiths are diplomats, red Warpsmiths monitor stars, and blue Warpsmiths are artisans.

==== Aza Chorn ====
The de facto leader of his warrior-class cluster. He is called to Earth to help recover a mortally wounded Qys envoy and to transport Miracleman and Miraclewoman to Qys itself. He and Phon Mooda are subsequently assigned to represent the Warpsmiths in observing Earth, helping build an observation station. When Kid Miracleman returns and destroys much of London, Chorn's teleportation skills play a major part in the battle. He unsuccessfully tries to contain Kid Miracleman by warping first the Bank of England and then Marble Arch onto the adversary, who merely breaks out. Chorn then arranges extra power and a disorientating return trip to Silence to allow Miracleman to press home his attack. Even then Kid Miracleman still holds the upper hand until Chorn is able to warp a piece of masonry inside his forcefield. Kid Miracleman survives even this, and uses his eye-beams to fatally wound Chorn, blasting one of his arms off. The Warpsmith is however still able to hang on to life long enough to teleport an iron bar into Kid Miracleman's chest, finally forcing him to revert to Johnny Bates.

==== Phon Mooda ====
A female cluster-wife of Aza Chorn. She is assigned along with Aza Chorn to observe Earth. Following the defeat of Kid Miracleman and Miracleman's takeover of Earth, she addresses the United Nations and informs them she has warped Earth's nuclear arsenal into the Sun. She also helps Kana Blur repair the Earth's ozone layer, and continues to dwell at Olympus. Phon Mooda also reports Earth's progress back to the Black Warpsmiths, sharing her concerns about Earth's stalling progress.

==== Uxu Chil ====
An apprentice female relatively new to the cluster. Her inexperience leads to the death of Gimsestra Dal when she warps the supports of a building the youth takes shelter in away. She is later absolved, largely because the whole encounter has been manipulated by the Black Warpsmiths. She later joins Aza Chorn in quietly mourning the loss of Tenga Dril.

==== Llans Ivo ====
A fiery cluster-wife who is only interested in fighting and mnemonic ballet. Her desire for action sees her overreact and assume the Qys are behind any incursion - leading to Llans Ivo seriously injuring two thrillseekers even with her warping abilities blocked. As with Uxu Chil she avoids censure due to the Black Warpsmiths' machinations. She takes great relish in taking part in a police action against the people of Carbeau.

==== Hrrin Luli ====
A cluster-husband of the group.

==== Tenga Dril ====
Another cluster-husband. Unknown to the rest of the group, he is killed and replaced by a Qys agent wearing a duplicate of his body. The false Tenga Dril covers for his lack of warping ability by claiming his derma-circuitry is damaged, but is flushed out during an audience with the Black Warpsmiths and destroyed by Aza Chorn. The real Tenga Dril is mourned by the rest of the cluster.

==== Kana Blur ====
The sole survivor of a cluster destroyed by the Whisper, he is placed in Aza Chorn's cluster as a replacement for Tenda Dril. After Aza Chorn is killed by Kid Miracleman on Earth in 1985, Kana Blur takes his place alongside Phon Mooda as one of the Warpsmith representatives on Earth. There he plays a key role in remoulding human society and subsequently splits his time between Olympus and the observation post. Like the rest of Miracleman's allies he is present at the reawakening of Young Miracleman. An alien race from the Gulf World Confederacy who can instantly transport matter, the Warpsmiths ally with Earth alongside the Qys Imperium. Aza Chorn and Phon Mooda are sent to be their representatives in relations with Earth; after the former is killed battling Kid Miracleman, his place is taken by Kana Blur.

== Others ==
=== Miracledog ===
Along with Lear and Rebbeck, Gargunza's secret laboratory also included a heavily modified dog, darkly named Miracledog by its creator. Its change-form is a small dog called Pluto. Due to the animal being unable to speak its own change-word, Gargunza modified it so it could change forms aurally, using the word "Steppenwolf". When Archer was close to discovering Gargunza had siphoned funds to the secret project, he absconded to Paraguay, taking Pluto with him.

When Gargunza resurfaced in 1982, the scientist unleashed Miracledog on Mike Moran and Evelyn Cream when they came to Paraguay looking for the captured Liz. In the resulting hunt, the monster killed Cream; however Moran was able to remember the animal's change-word and revert it to Pluto. He killed the stunned dog with a rock, trapping its change-form in Underspace.

After Miracleman and his allies take control of Earth, they recover Miracledog's change-form and engineer it to have a more benign personality. Joining them at Olympus, it flies around the world performing heroic feats.
