= Freshwater, Isle of Wight =

Village on the Isle of Wight, England

Coordinates: 50°40′57″N 1°31′30″W

Freshwater
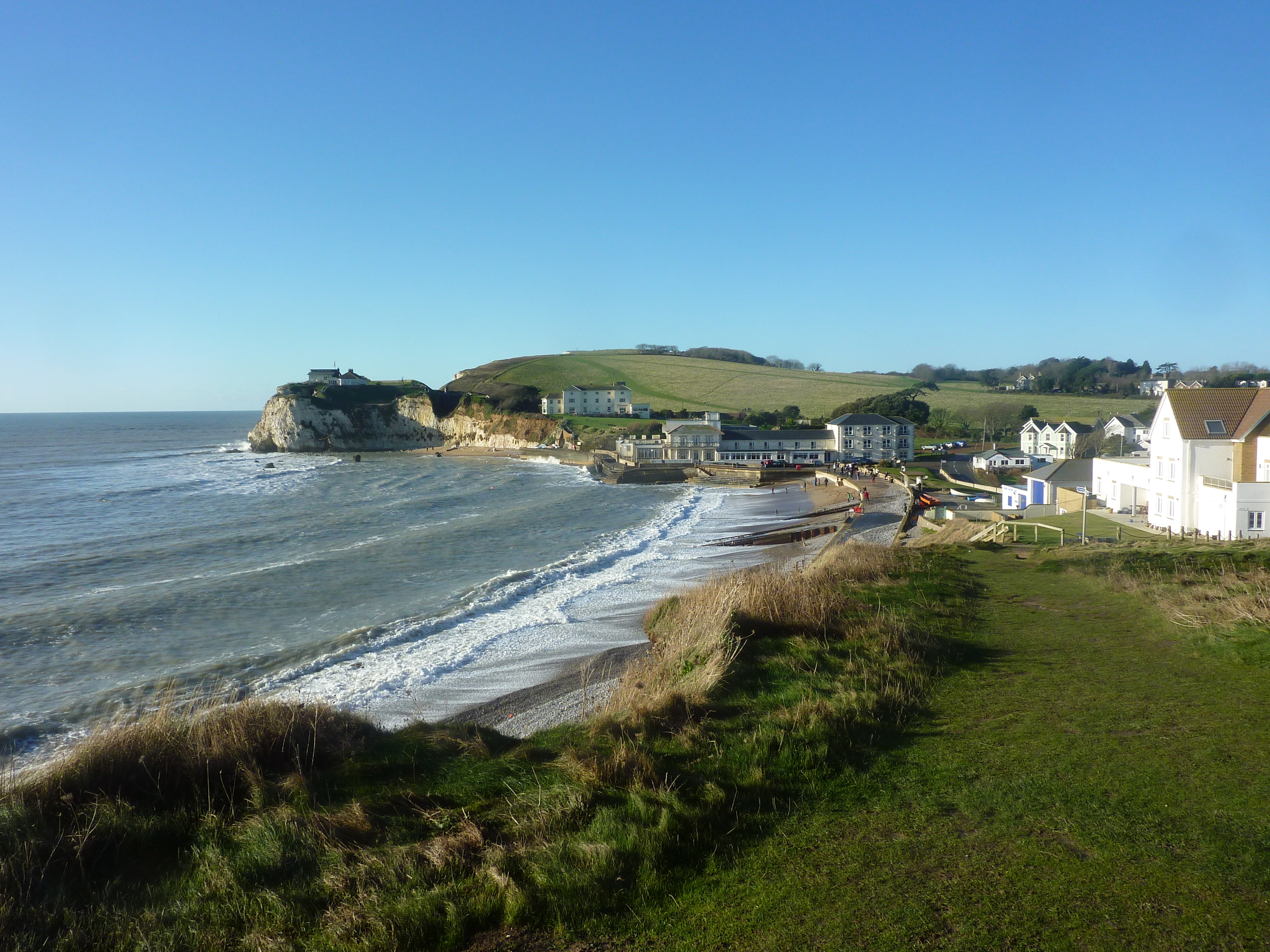
- Freshwater Bay, December 2013

- Location within the Isle of Wight
- Area: 5.59 sq mi (14.5 km^{2})
- Population: 5,369 (2011 census)
  - Density: 960/sq mi (370/km^{2})
- Civil parish: Freshwater
- Unitary authority: Isle of Wight
- Ceremonial county: Isle of Wight
- Region: South East
- Country: England
- Sovereign state: United Kingdom
- Post town: FRESHWATER
- Postcode district: PO40
- Dialling code: 01983
- Police: Hampshire and Isle of Wight
- Fire: Hampshire and Isle of Wight
- Ambulance: Isle of Wight
- UK Parliament: Isle of Wight West

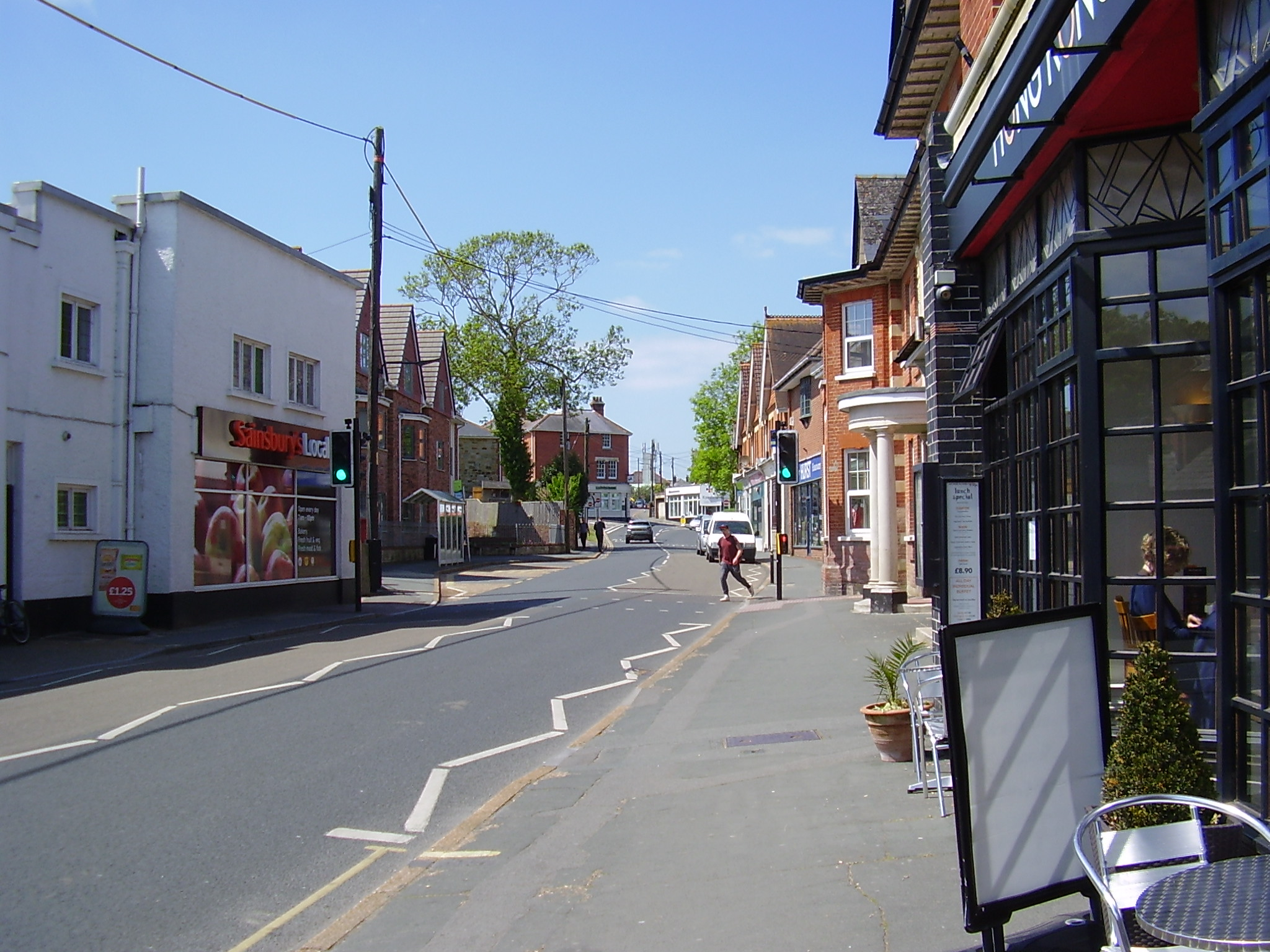
Freshwater town centre

Freshwater is a large village and civil parish at the western end of the Isle of Wight, England. The southern, coastal village is Freshwater Bay, named for the adjacent small cove. Freshwater sits at the western end of the region known as the Back of the Wight or the West Wight, a popular tourist area.

Freshwater is close to steep chalk cliffs. It was the birthplace of physicist Robert Hooke and was the home of Poet Laureate Alfred Lord Tennyson.

== Name ==
The name means 'the stream with fresh (not salty, as it is at the mouth of the river) water', from Old English fersc and wæter, probably referring to a tributary of the Western Yar.

1086: Frescewatre

~1145: Freskewatre

1194: Freschewatere

1280: Fersshewatere

1322: Fresshwatre

== Landmarks ==
Freshwater is famous for its geology and coastal rock formations that have resulted from centuries of coastal erosion. Arch Rock was a well-known local landmark that collapsed on 25 October 1992. The neighbouring Stag Rock is so named because supposedly a stag leapt to the rock from the cliff to escape during a hunt. Another huge slab fell off the cliff face in 1968, and is now known as the Mermaid Rock. Immediately behind Mermaid Rock lies a small sea cave that cuts several metres into the new cliff.

Freshwater's beach is very popular with tourists and locals. It is mostly pebbles, but it is also covered in chalk from the nearby cliffs, which is frequently gathered by tourists as souvenirs.

Freshwater features an excellent example of a surviving Victorian Beach hotel, The Albion. It was built around the time Freshwater became well-regarded as a coastal resort and is still popular today. Frequent repair work and repainting are undertaken on the building's seafront exterior walls, due to strong storms which often batter rocks, and other debris, against it.

The hills above Freshwater are named after Tennyson. On the nearby Tennyson Down is a Cornish granite cross erected in 1897 in tribute to Tennyson, "by the people of Freshwater, and other friends in England and America." There is also a hill in the area called Hooke Hill, named after Robert Hooke.

The Anglican All Saints' Church, Freshwater is one of the oldest churches on the Isle of Wight, and it was listed in the Domesday survey of 1086. All Saints is in the Anglican Diocese of Portsmouth. A primary school associated with the church is nearby. There is a marble memorial commemorating Tennyson in All Saints Church. Tennyson's wife Emily and other family members are buried in the church cemetery. The church is also the site of a memorial to Tennyson's son, Lionel Tennyson, who died of malaria in 1886.

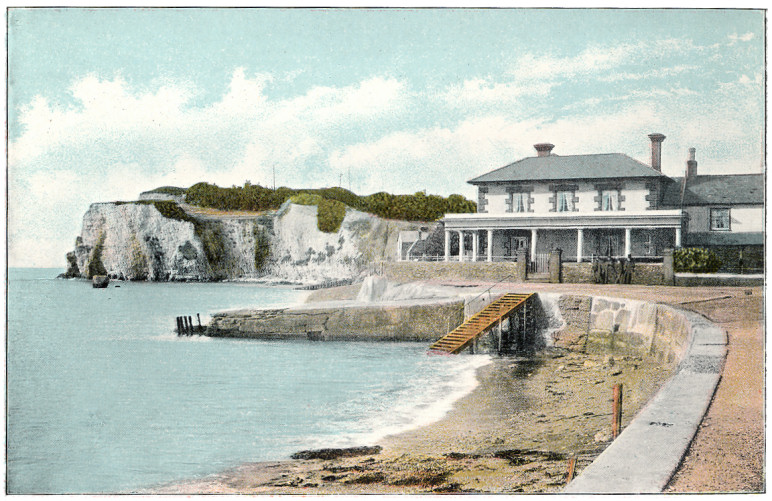
Freshwater Bay, c. 1910. The large building in the foreground is The Albion, a Victorian hotel built in response to an increase in popularity

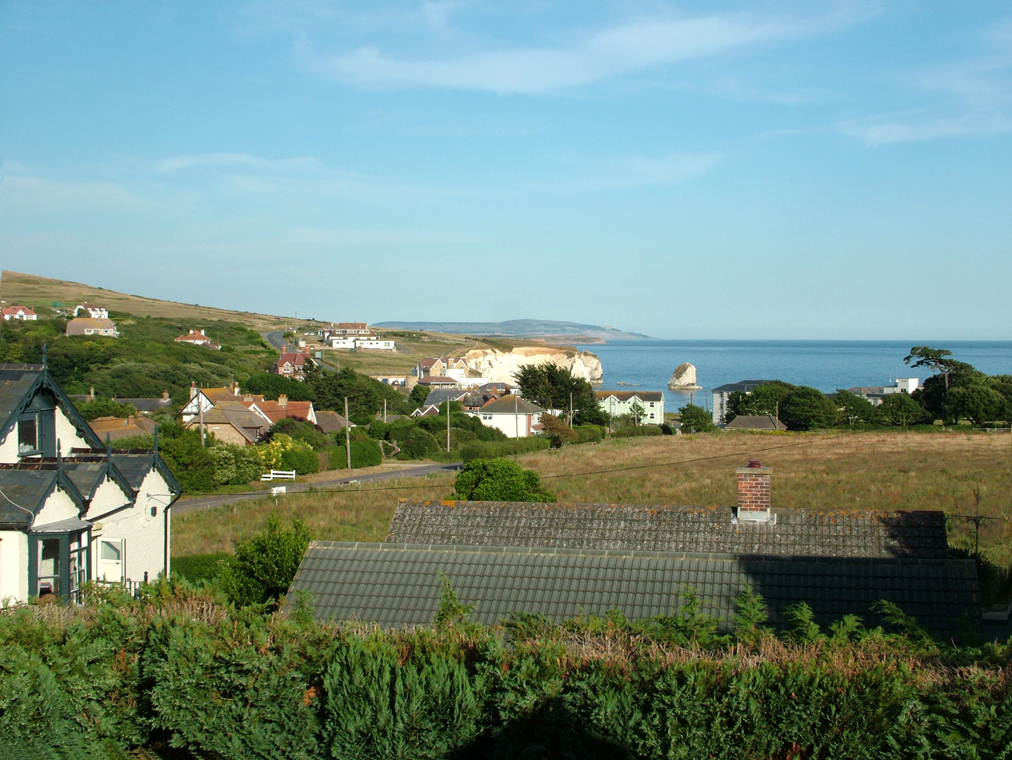
Dimbola Lodge (foreground, left), overlooking Freshwater Bay, 2006

Dimbola Lodge, the home of Julia Margaret Cameron and now a photographic museum, is in the village of Freshwater Bay, which is part of Freshwater.

Tennyson's son, Hallam, donated land for a new church in Freshwater Bay. Hallam's wife Audrey Tennyson suggested that the church be named for St. Agnes. St. Agnes' Church, Freshwater was consecrated on 12 August 1908. It is the only thatched church on the Isle of Wight.

Freshwater was the site of the largest station on the Freshwater, Yarmouth and Newport Railway that operated from 20 July 1889 to 21 September 1953. A supermarket and garden centre now occupies the location of the former station.

Freshwater is near the source of the Western Yar, a river whose estuary runs north to Yarmouth. Freshwater Marshes are a Site of Special Scientific Interest, and a large part of the Marshes is also a Local Nature Reserve called Afton Marshes.

At the western end of Freshwater Bay on a bluff are the remains of Fort Redoubt, also known as Fort Freshwater or Freshwater Redoubt, a Palmerston Fort. Fort Redoubt was built in 1855–1856 to protect Freshwater Bay and was in use until the early 20th century; it was sold by the military in 1928. A doorway carved into the cliff below the fort was the main access to the building from the beach, although most of the iron stairway that formerly gave access has broken up due to rust and the action of the sea.

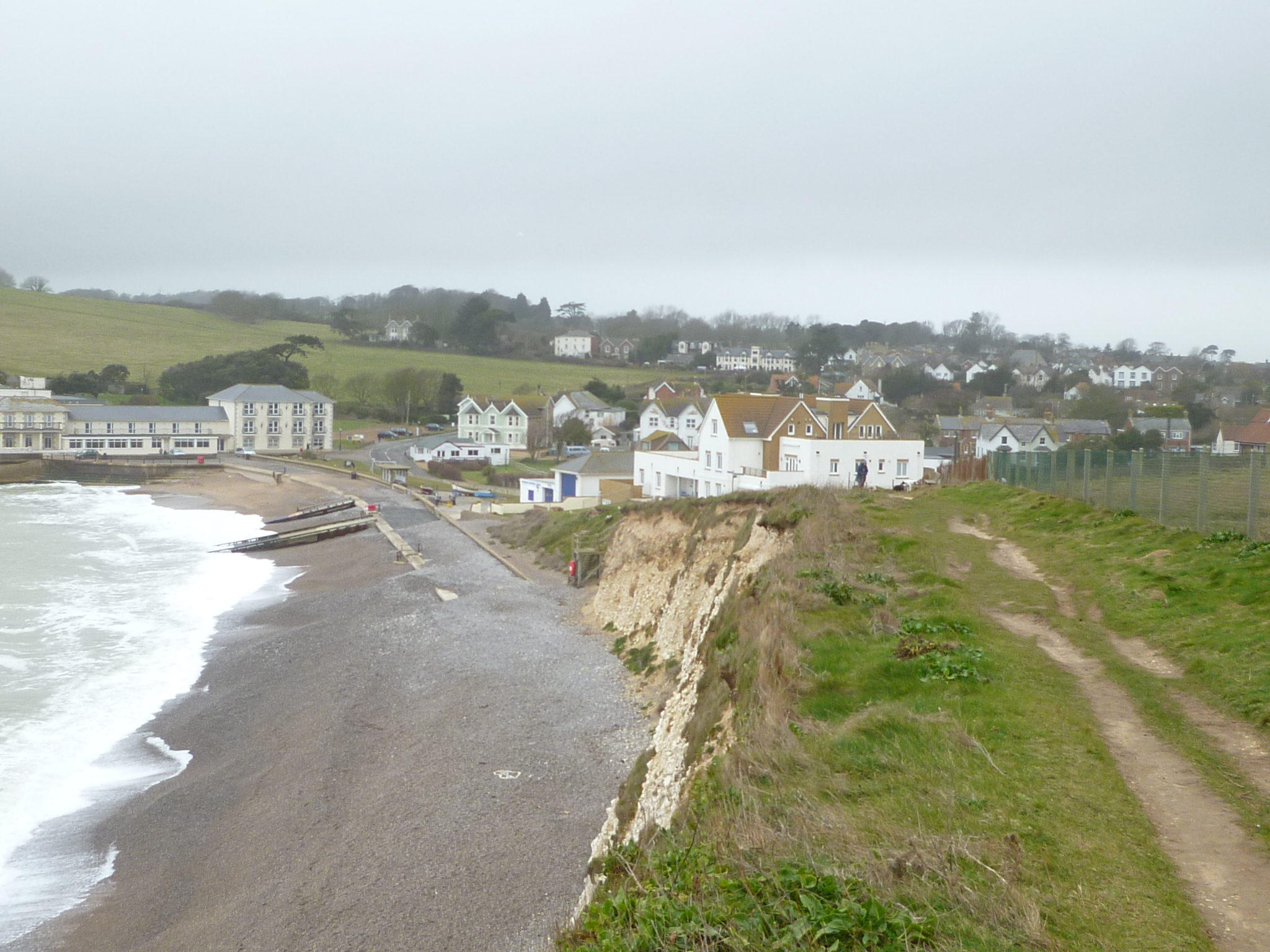
Despite being sited near a cove, Freshwater often receives high waves as a result of storms in the English Channel

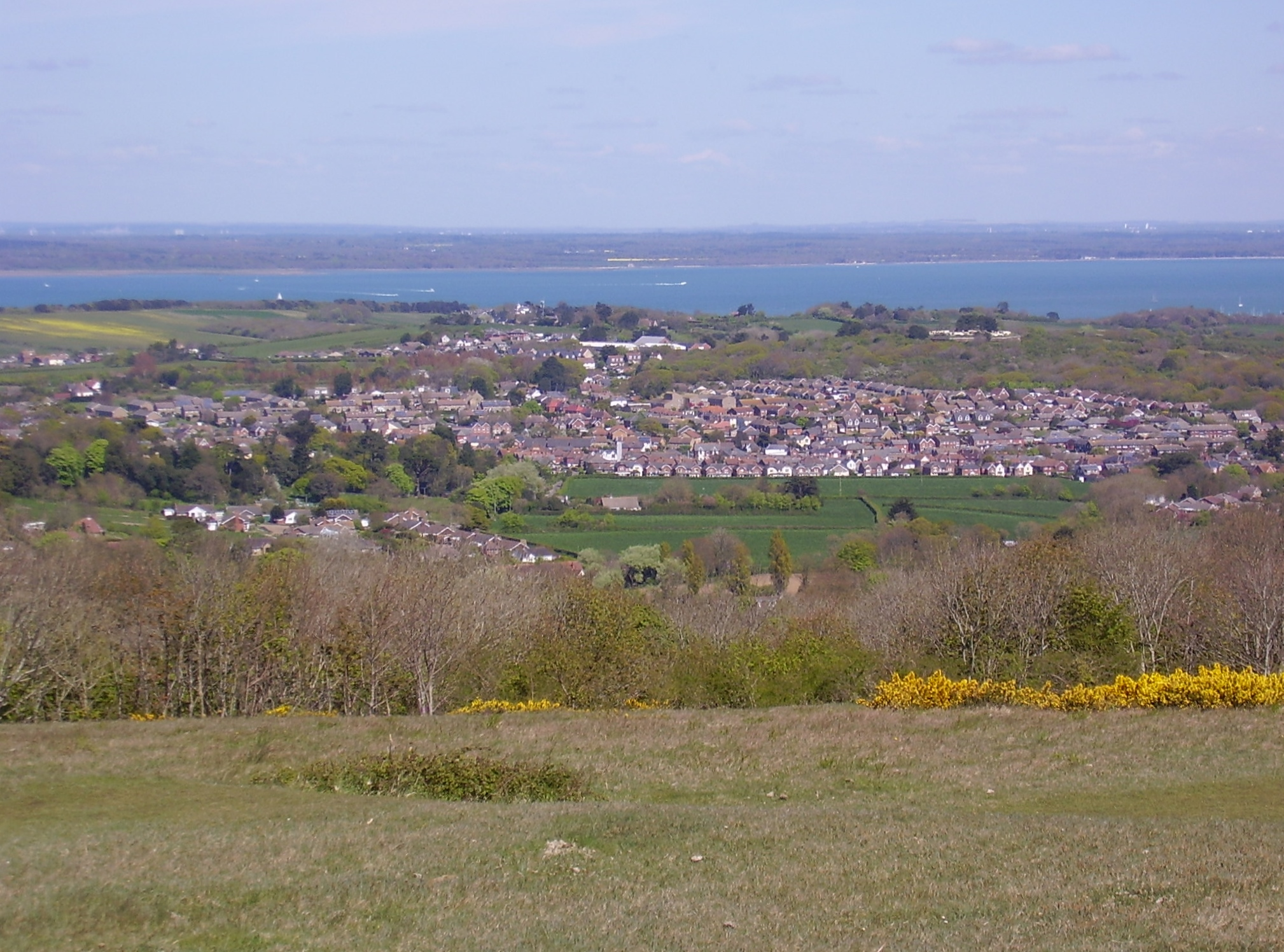
View of Freshwater from Tennyson Down, with the Solent beyond.

Two unusual structures that have been described as ice houses, pottery kilns or crematoria are found on Moons Hill in Freshwater. Robert Walker was the first to excavate these features in the 1890s, and he thought they were evidence of a Phoenician settlement in Freshwater. Chemical analyses suggest that they were most likely lime kilns.

== Notable residents ==
The renowned scientist Robert Hooke (1635–1703) was born in Freshwater in 1635. His father John Hooke was the curate of All Saints Church in Freshwater. When Hooke's father died in 1648, Hooke left Freshwater for London to be apprenticed to portrait painter Peter Lely. After that, he went to Westminster School and then Oxford.

Painter George Morland lived in Freshwater in a structure known as the Cabin around 1800.

British Poet laureate Alfred Lord Tennyson lived at nearby Farringford House (on the road between Freshwater and Alum Bay). Tennyson lived at Farringford from 1853 until the end of his life in 1892. Tennyson wrote of Farringford:

"Where, far from noise and smoke of town
I watch the twilight falling brown,
All round a careless-ordered garden,
Close to the ridge of a noble down."

Tennyson rented Farringford in 1853 and then bought it in 1856. He found that there were too many starstruck tourists who pestered him in Farringford, so he moved to Aldworth, a stately home on Blackdown hill between Lurgashall and Fernhurst, about 1 1/4 miles (2.0 km) south of Haslemere in West Sussex in 1869. However, he returned to Farringford to spend the winters.

Pioneering photographer Julia Margaret Cameron lived in Freshwater at Dimbola Lodge from 1860 to 1875. Gertrude Fenton, the novelist and editor of The Carisbrooke Magazine, lived at Lacey's Farm, Freshwater in the early 1880s.

Freshwater was also the birthplace of Sir Vivian Ernest Fuchs (11 February 1908 – 11 November 1999), an English explorer and Fellow of the Royal Society, whose expeditionary team completed the first overland crossing of Antarctica in 1958.

Conductor Trevor Harvey was born in Freshwater in 1911.

== Organisations ==
The Freshwater Village Association was created in November 2006. The Freshwater Village Association was formed by Freshwater residents who are concerned that Freshwater might lose its identity as a village. The Freshwater Bay Residents Association was created on 2 July 1984, to express concern over the development of Freshwater Bay.

Freshwater Lifeboat is an independent lifesaving organisation based in Freshwater Bay. It operates the Freshwater Bay Lifeboat Station on the promenade along Freshwater Bay and two lifeboats from public donations and profits from shop sales since it is not part of the Royal National Lifeboat Institution.

It hosts the Freshwater and Totland Carnival every year.

Freshwater is the headquarters of the Robert Hooke Society, who have created a walking trail around the area called the "Hooke Trail" to visit sites associated with him. They hold bi-monthly meetings at the Island Planetarium at Fort Victoria, a yearly Memorial Luncheon on 3 March on the date of his death and week-long celebrations of his birthday, 18 July.

== History ==
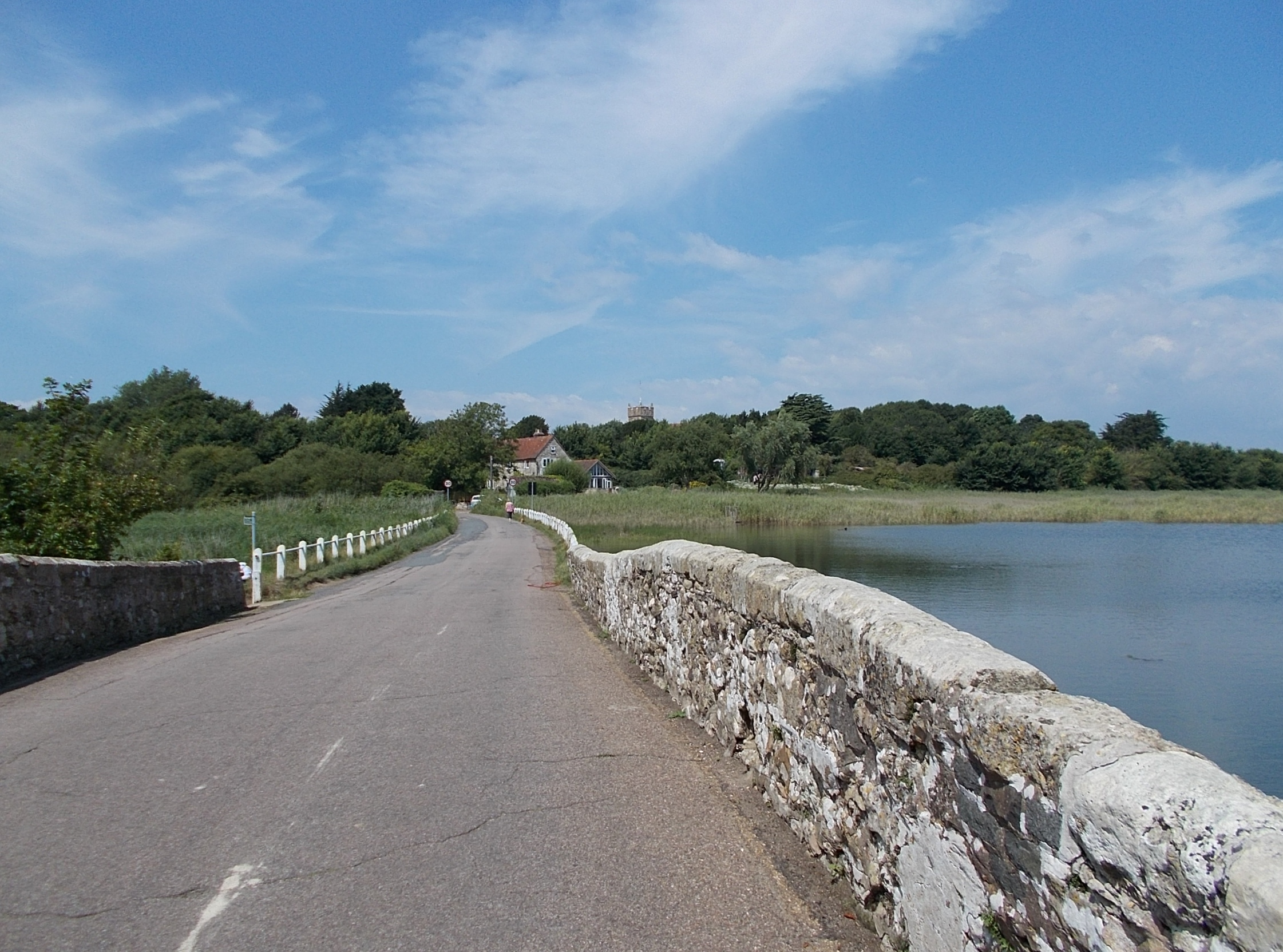
The ancient causeway over the River Yar, leading into Freshwater, looking west, with the tower of the mediaeval All Saints' Church, Freshwater visible above the trees.

There is evidence of a Roman harbour at the end of the Western Yar. A Romano-British grave containing a Vectis ware pot was found on Sheepwash Farm in 1898. In 530 AD, the Island fell to a combined force of Saxons and Jutes. After the Norman Conquest, Lord of the Island William Fitz Osbern gave the Saxon All Saints' Church and its tithes to the Norman Abbey of Lyre sometime between 1066 and his death in 1071. In 1414 all alien priories were seized by the Crown. In 1623, when King James I gave Freshwater Parish to John Williams, Bishop of Lincoln, Williams then granted Freshwater to St John's College, Cambridge on 24 March 1623.

The Freshwater Parish originally was composed of five farms, known as "tuns": Norton, Sutton, Easton, Weston and Middleton. All of these place names still exist, except for Sutton, which is now called Freshwater Bay (previously Freshwater Gate). The first meeting of the Freshwater Parish Council was on 31 December 1894.

In 2010, 250 kg of cocaine was found in Freshwater Bay. The "Freshwater Five" fishing crew were convicted in relation to this, but are appealing their conviction.

== Parish attractions ==
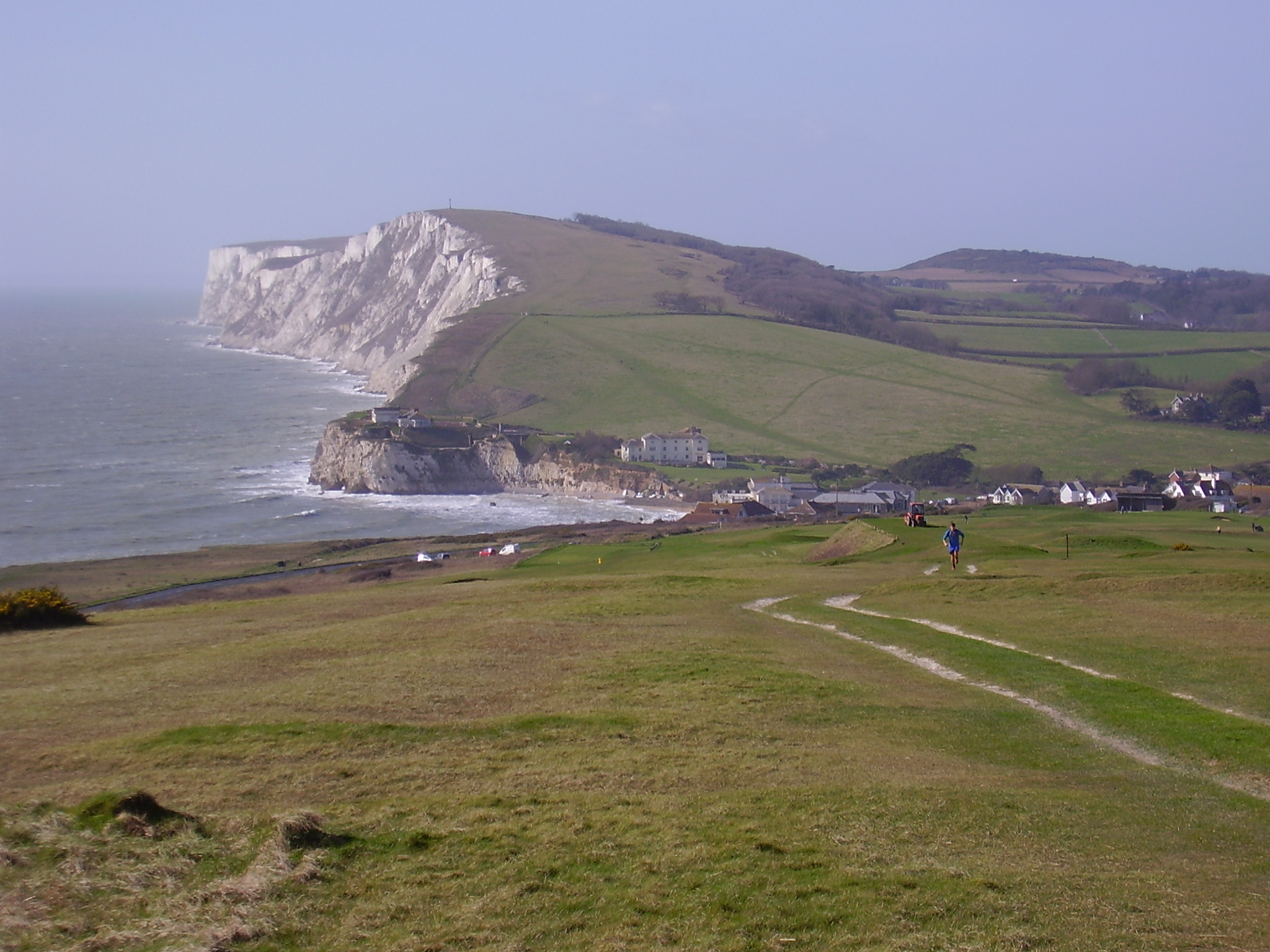
Freshwater Bay, with the lower reaches of the golf course in the foreground and the chalk cliffs of Tennyson Down behind

There are several attractions within the immediate area:

- Farringford House, home of poet Alfred Lord Tennyson.
- Dimbola Lodge, home of photographer Julia Margaret Cameron.
- West Wight Sports Centre.
- Freshwater Bay Golf Course.
- Afton Down, the site of the Isle of Wight Festival 1970.
- The Needles Old Battery, a Victorian fort and post-Second World War High Down Rocket Test Site.
- Needles Lighthouse and chalk rocks.
- Compton Bay, where dinosaur footprints are visible at low tide.
- The Longstone, some four miles distant, the only megalithic monument on the Island.
- The coastal village of Freshwater Bay.

Not all of these attractions are within the formal boundaries of the village.

== Transport ==
Freshwater is linked to other parts of the Island by Southern Vectis buses on route 7 and route 12 serving Totland, Yarmouth and Newport as well as intermediate villages. In the Summer, open-top bus "The Needles Tour" and tourist service "Island Coaster" serve Freshwater Bay. Freshwater is on the Isle of Wight Coastal Path.

For local transport within West Wight, a community transport scheme called FYT Bus (Freshwater, Yarmouth and Totland) running a mix scheduled and on demand services, and expanded in 2023 with a new electric minibus.

Freshwater was connected by train when the Freshwater, Yarmouth and Newport Railway opened in 1888. Due to low usage, especially outside the holiday season after the war, the line closed in 1953, ten years before the Beeching cuts were published.

== Sport ==
Freshwater is home to West Wight Football Club, who are based at Camp Road. Founded in 1925, they are affiliated to the Hampshire Football Association and are long serving members of the Isle of Wight League, a competition they have won on numerous occasions. The club also enjoyed a 10 year spell playing in the Hampshire League (1984-94) and won the county Intermediate Cup in 2009. They also have a large youth section that caters for all standards.

Freshwater Cricket Club are based at West Wight Sports Centre, Moa Place and long serving members of the Isle of Wight League.

== See also ==
- List of current places of worship on the Isle of Wight
