= Bouldnor and Hamstead Cliffs =

Coordinates: 50.712°N 1.447°W

- Site of Special Scientific Interest
- Location of Bouldnor and Hamstead Cliffs.
- Area of search: Isle of Wight
- Grid reference: SZ390910
- Interest: Biological and Geological
- Area: 95.7 ha (236 acres)
- Notification date: 1951
- Location map: Natural England

Bouldnor and Hamstead Cliffs is a 95.7-hectare (236-acre) site of special scientific interest which is located north-east of Yarmouth. The site was notified in 1951, for both its biological and geological features.
