= West Wight Sports Centre =

Sports venue in Freshwater, Isle of Wight

Coordinates: 50.682°N 1.524°W

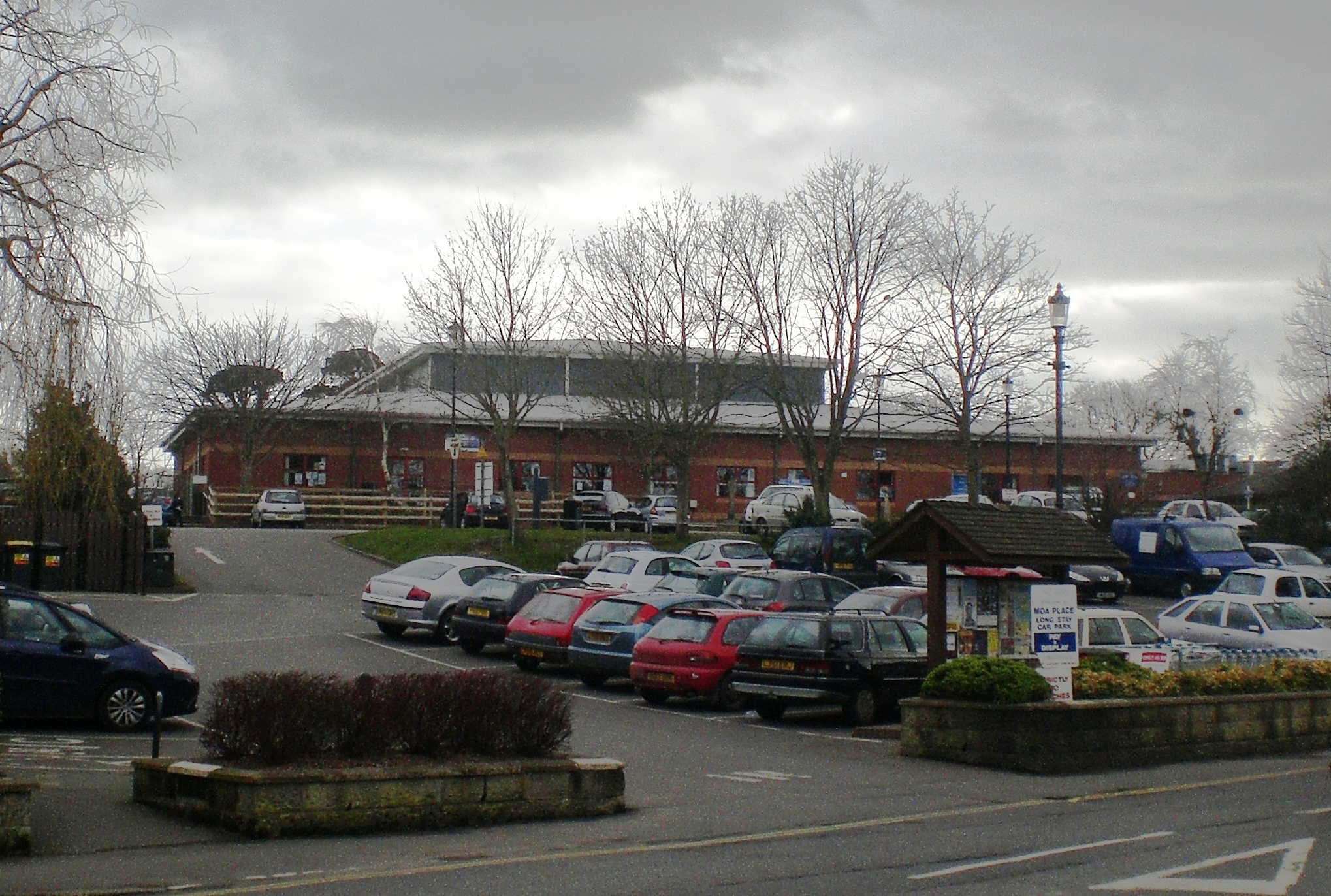
West Wight Sports and Community Centre

West Wight Sports and Community Centre is a registered charity (reg number 273334) providing sports, health and fitness to the West Wight. Based in Moa place, Freshwater, on the Isle of Wight, the sports and community centre has swimming pools, sports hall, gym, cafe, meeting rooms, exercise classes, community kitchen, IT suite, hair salon, and hydrotherapy. It hosts numerous events including the Needles XC Half Marathon, Solent Swim and Needles Swim.

The facility employs more than 50 full and part-time staff making it one of the largest employers in the West Wight. It is also a stop off station for events including the Randonnee.

== Facilities and courses ==
The sports complex facilities comprise: a 25 metres (27 yd) swimming pool with diving boards; a 10 metres (11 yd) swimming pool; a fully equipped fitness suite; a 52 metres (57 yd) sports hall; a meeting room (named in honour of Lord Louis Mountbatten); a sports field; community centre with IT room and community kitchen; and a cafe which hosts many community events.

There is a diverse range of activities on offer including over 40 adult exercise classes and a wide range youth activities plus extensive summer holiday activities. Classes and activities include swimming lessons, youth football training, five-a-side football, circuit training, yoga, tai chi, boot camp, kettle bells, boxfit, volleyball, Pilates, seated exercise sessions, Zumba, walking football, TRX suspension training, High Intensity Interval Training (HIIT) Trampolining, Sub Aqua, waterfit sessions, walking group, line dancing, seniors' table tennis, heart care club, canoeing, indoor skateboarding, fencing, karate, girls' football, junior gym, junior and senior youth clubs, dance, archery, kickboxing, rifle shooting. The centre also offers lifeguard, emergency pool procedures, and emergency first aid at work training courses.

== History ==
In 1977, the local village committee managed to obtain the funding to build a 25 metres (27 yd) swimming pool in Freshwater for the local swimming club to train. This was originally a primitive site with portable changing rooms, however after a few years, the building was refurbished. In 1991, a 10 metres (11 yd) pool was added to the facilities. Then in 1999, the biggest overhaul yet was planned. The committee made a successful bid for a multimillion-pound grant from the Sports Council and the National Lottery, which was invested in creating the current facilities.

== Trivia ==
The Commonwealth medalist swimmer Darren Mew trained in this pool as a rookie.
