= Dimbola Museum and Galleries =

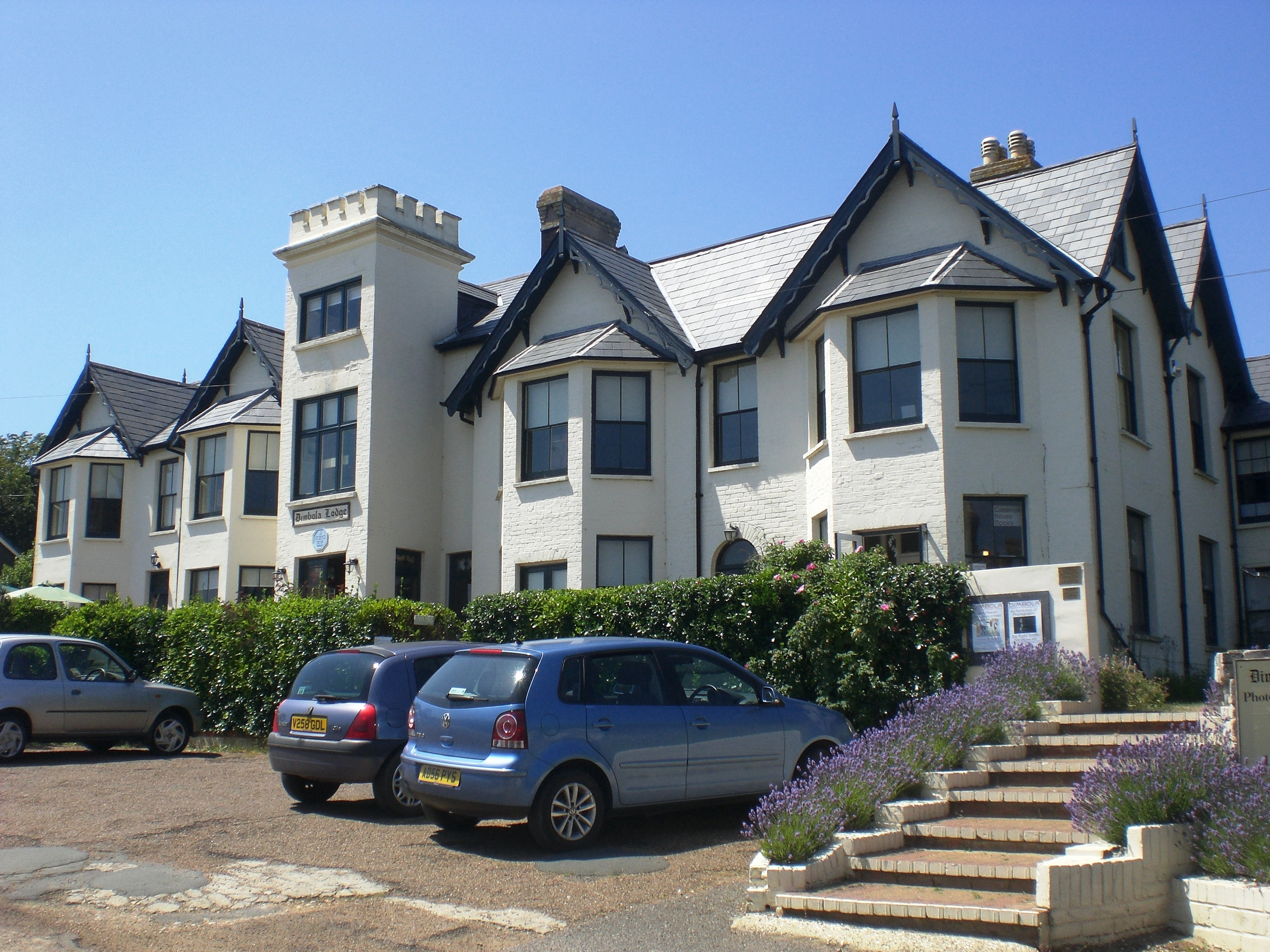
- Dimbola Lodge

- Location within Isle of Wight
- Location: Freshwater, Isle of Wight
- Coordinates: 50.675556°N 1.515278°W
- Chairperson: Brian Hinton
- Website: www.dimbola.co.uk

Dimbola was the home and workplace of the Victorian pioneer photographer Julia Margaret Cameron, where she lived from 1860 to 1875 on the Isle of Wight It is now a museum and galleries dedicated to her life and work which also showcases contemporary exhibitions of photographers from around the world. The museum is run by the Julia Margaret Cameron Trust, a registered charity.

== History of the property ==
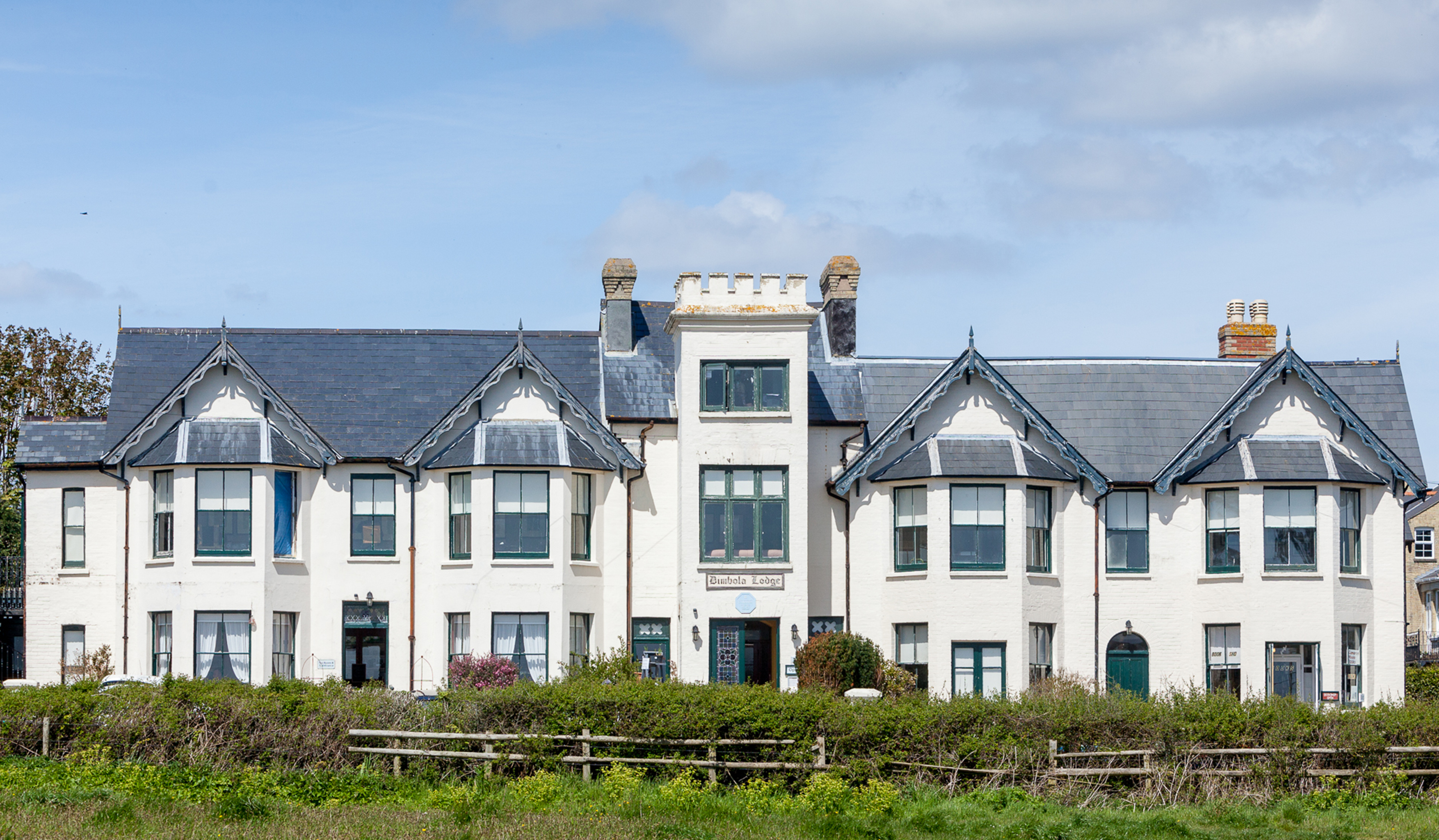
Dimbola Museum & Galleries

In 1860, Julia Margaret Cameron bought two adjacent cottages in Freshwater Bay from a local fisherman named Jacob Long. In order to make the house look more beautiful to her friends returning from the beach, they were linked by a central tower in the Gothic style current at the time. The structure dominates the skyline from Freshwater Bay and gives a focus to the surrounding area.

Dimbola took its name from the family's coffee (later tea) plantation in Dimbula, Ceylon (now Sri Lanka). Dimbola served as both her home and her studio. It was here that the greatest of Cameron's photographs were made.

After the Camerons returned to Ceylon the property was again divided into two parts. These were later named Dimbola, which became a private residence and holiday flats. In 1991, a property company bought and obtained permission to demolish what was then called 'Cameron House'. The Julia Margaret Cameron Trust was formed, with the immediate and urgent aim of saving the house which was achieved three years later.

Dimbola is now a museum and galleries dedicated to Cameron's life and work. It is also home to a permanent exhibition about the Isle of Wight Festival 1970 held at nearby Afton Down. As well as showing contemporary exhibitions of photographers. Exhibitors have included Annie Leibovitz, Chris Packham and Terry O'Neill.

In 2006, a sculptural tribute to Jimi Hendrix was erected here, looking out towards Afton Down where the 1970 Isle of Wight Festival was held.

== See also ==
- List of museums devoted to one photographer
