= Western Yar =

River on the Isle of Wight, England

Coordinates: 50°42′07″N 1°30′06″W

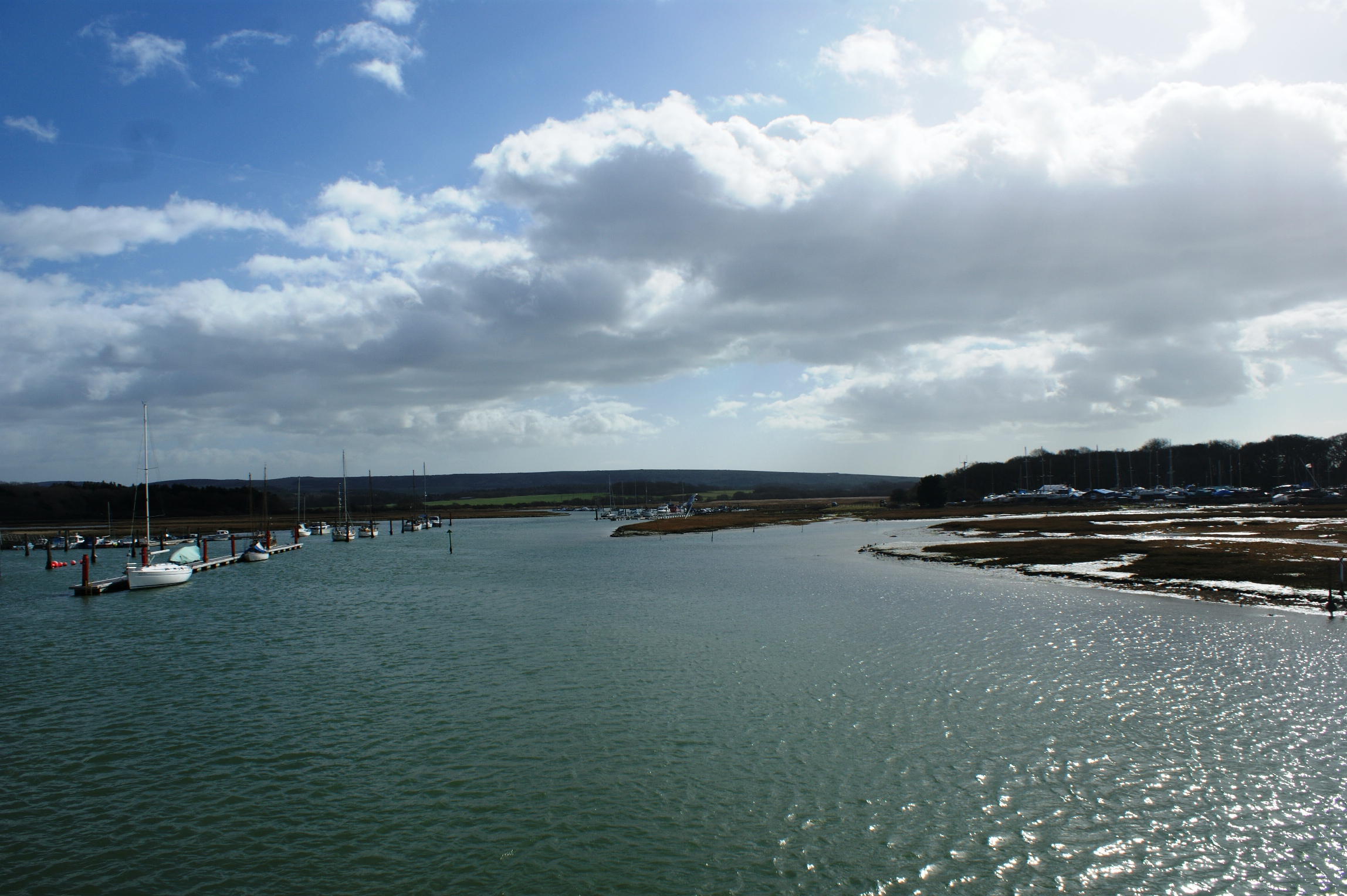
- The Western Yar from the Yar Bridge at Yarmouth.

Physical characteristics
- Source
  - location: Freshwater
- Mouth
  - location: Solent

The River Yar on the Isle of Wight, England, rises near the beach at Freshwater Bay, on the south coast, and flows only a few miles north to Yarmouth where it meets the Solent. Most of the river is a tidal estuary. Its headwaters have been truncated by erosion of the south coast.

The estuary from Freshwater to Yarmouth is part of the island's Area of Outstanding Natural Beauty. It contains important habitats, including saltmarsh, reedbeds, mud flats and sand dunes. These host a rich abundance of wildlife, particularly overwintering wildfowl and waders.

The Yar estuary is also a 132.4-hectare (327-acre) biological Site of Special Scientific Interest. In addition the upper reaches of the river are designated an SSSI called Freshwater Marshes, and a large part of Freshwater Marshes are also a Local Nature Reserve called Afton Marshes.

During World war two it was used as the basis of the Yar stop line which was fortified in part with Type 22 pillboxes.

The Yar is one of two rivers of that name on the Isle of Wight. It is referred to as the Western Yar if it is necessary to distinguish between them with the other river being known as the Eastern Yar.

== Name ==
The name is a "back-formation" from the place-name Yarmouth. The name means 'the gravelly or muddy river mouth', from Old English ēaren and mūth.

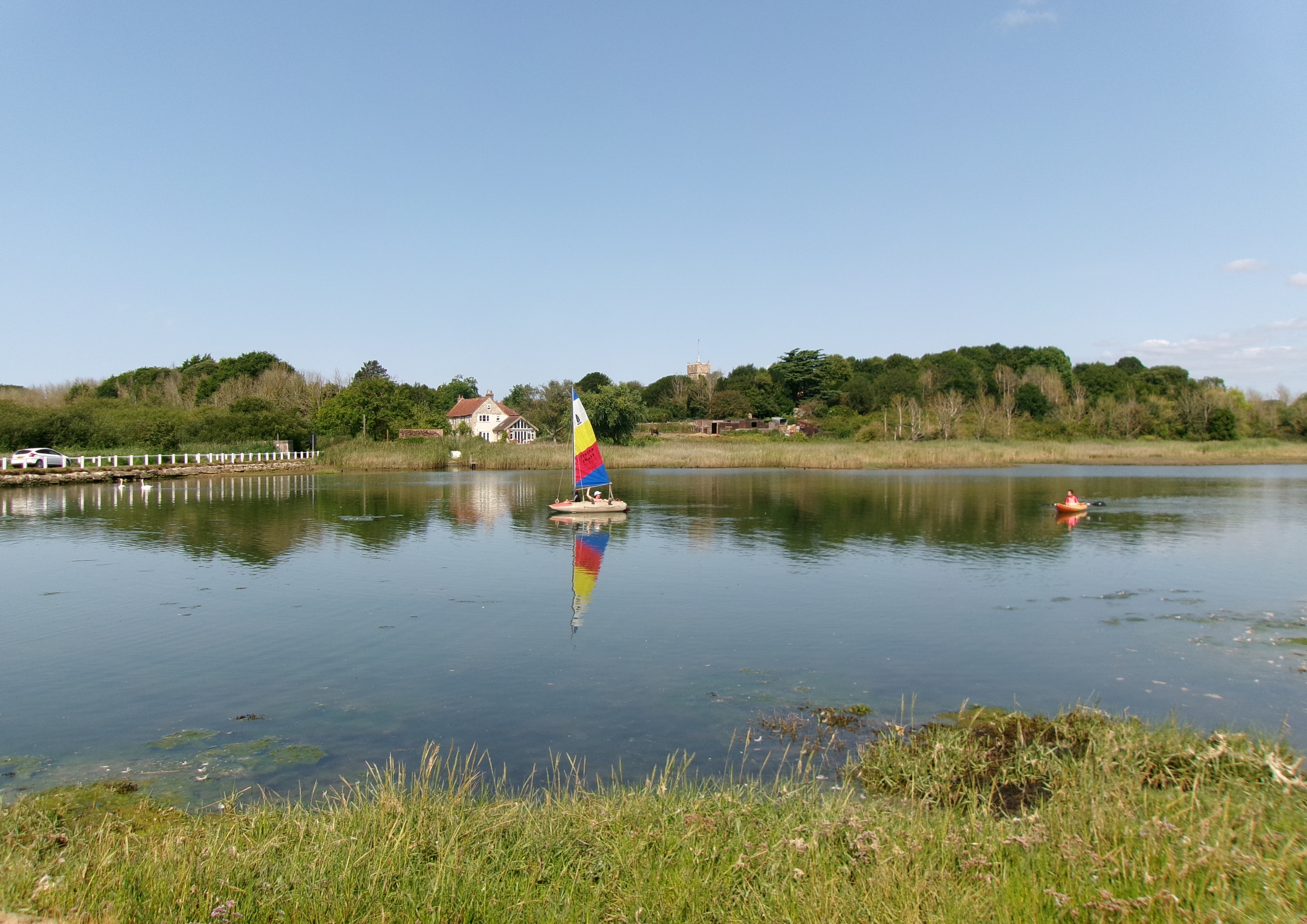
River Yar at Freshwater, with the tower of All Saints' Church, Freshwater visible above the trees.

== See also ==
- Isle of Wight Area of Outstanding Natural Beauty
