= List of Miracleman story arcs =

This article is a list of story arcs in the Quality Communications/Eclipse Comics/Marvel Comics comic book story Marvelman, later known as Miracleman.

== Story arcs ==
=== Book 1: A Dream of Flying ===
- Originally printed in Warrior #1–3, #5–11 & Marvelman Summer Special; coloured and reprinted in Miracleman (Eclipse Comics) #1–3 & Miracleman 3D #1; recoloured and reprinted in Miracleman (Marvel Comics) #1–4

In 1982 England, Mike Moran is a struggling 40-year-old freelance journalist. He has a happy but childless marriage to Liz, a successful professional illustrator. Moran is haunted by a nightmare wherein he is a superhuman with two friends being destroyed in a huge explosion, a vision which gives him frequent migraines. In the dreams he utters a word he cannot quite remember. On 4 February, he takes an assignment to cover the opening of a new nuclear power station at Larksmere in the Lake District. The event is attacked by terrorists performing a plutonium hijack, triggering one of Moran's migraines. He is dragged to another room by one of the gunmen and the word 'atomic' catches his eye, reversed on the back of a glass door. He reads it as "Kimota" and is transformed into Miracleman, a superhuman who quickly disables the terrorists and leaves, triumphantly noting he is back after 18 years. Miracleman returns to Liz and tells her what has happened, and how a young Micky Moran had received the secret of the Harmonic Key of the Universe from astro-physicist Guntag Borghelm in 1954, allowing him to change into the powerful superhero Miracleman. He was joined by comrades Young Miracleman and Kid Miracleman to fight evils including Doctor Gargunza until 1963, when the so-called Miracleman Family were seemingly killed investigating a space station. Moran survived, but with no recollection of his time as Miracleman until the events at Larksmere. Liz is initially highly sceptical but is eventually forced to accept the evidence in front of her.

The following morning they receive a call from Jonathan Bates – formerly Kid Miracleman, and now CEO of the successful Sunburst Electronics – who noticed the news reports of an unidentified object at Larksmere. Miracleman changes back to Moran and initially the reunion in London is friendly as Bates explains he escaped the explosion with his memory but lost his powers, instead building up his business Sunburst Cybernetics. However Mike realises he is still in fact Kid Miracleman when Bates tries to fog his mind, and is forced to call upon Miracleman. A fight breaks out but due to Kid Miracleman having spent the intervening years in his superhuman form he has skills and powers Miracleman does not, and twice trounces him as they fight through London's docklands. Kid Miracleman notes he was happy to build up power through wealth and political advancement but with Miracleman back would simply now take Earth by force. He prepares to kill his former mentor and his wife, but during his gloating refers to himself in the third person. As "Miracleman" is his change-word, this reverts him to the adolescent Johnny Bates, seemingly unable to change back to Kid Miracleman. Shaken and battered, Miracleman and Liz leave him for the authorities.

The Morans lie low, helped by a government D-notice preventing investigation into the events in London, and it is two months before Mike turns into Miracleman again as the couple try to find out more about his powers on May Day at a secluded area of Dartmoor. Liz also tells Mike that she is pregnant by Miracleman. Elsewhere, the events in London have alerted Sir Dennis Archer, head of RAF intelligence unit Spookshow. He hires assassin Evelyn Cream to find and kill Miracleman. However Cream ultimately betrays Archer and offers to help Miracleman find out more about his history in return for being able to profit from the information he will gain in the process. In July, Cream discovers the Cotswolds location of the Project Zarathustra bunker, which the pair infiltrate. Archer organises defences including special forces soldiers and the deranged superhuman Big Ben, all of which are no match for Miracleman. However once inside Miracleman is rocked by the discovery that he was created as a superweapon by the British government and his time as Miracleman was actually a virtual reality simulation designed to keep control of the powerful superhumans, which were actually clones of a trio of orphans that switch places with the originals upon speaking a change word, with the inactive body being kept in infra-space. Once it was felt the project was in danger of becoming uncontrollable a nuclear bomb codenamed Dragonslayer and disguised as a space station was used as a lure to destroy the trio in 1963. Already staggered, Miracleman flies into a rage when he discovers that the architect of all of this was the real-life Doctor Emil Gargunza. He destroys much of the bunker before Cream is able to calm him, and the pair slip away. Project Zarathustra is finally closed down and Archer is disgraced.

=== Book 2: The Red King Syndrome ===
- Originally partially printed in Warrior #13–21; coloured, reprinted and concluded in Miracleman (Eclipse Comics) #4–10; recoloured and reprinted in Miracleman (Marvel Comics) #5-#10

Cream warns Archer off further investigation of Miracleman, while Mike and Liz struggle with her pregnancy. Unsure of his next move, Miracleman heads to Epping Forest to think, meeting a young boy named Jason Oakey. However, on his return he finds Liz has been kidnapped. With help from Cream they realise Gargunza, now living in Paraguay, is the culprit, and set off to Paraguay to rescue her. Gargunza explains to Liz he plans to have his brain transferred to her nearly-due baby, having monitored the couple since their marriage. He also tells her of his life and the discovery of a crashed alien spacecraft in Wiltshire that gave him the technology to create the superhumans. Miracleman and Cream arrive, but Gargunza uses a post-hypnotic command (installed after an incident in 1961 where Miracleman had nearly awakened) to transform him back into Mike Moran for an hour. He reveals his dog can also change into the vicious Miracledog, and sets the beast to hunt the pair in the jungle. Cream is killed while Moran is maimed before he is able to recall the monster's change-word, reverting it to a domestic dog. Moran kills it and evades Gargunza's guards until he is once again able to change into Miracleman. The superhuman storms Gargunza's compound and grabs the scientist by the throat, carrying him into orbit. After kissing his creator he hurls Gargunza back to Earth, causing him to burn up in the atmosphere until only his pelvis bone is left. Miracleman then flies Liz to a secluded location and delivers the baby successfully on 29 May 1985. Both are overjoyed but stunned when the new-born speaks moments later.

Afterward two aliens search the Earth, finding Bates catatonic in St. Crispin's Hospital. Unknown to them, Kid Miracleman remains in his mind, and eventually goads Bates into awakening. Mike and Liz meanwhile are struggling to content with their baby's rapid progress. Liz suffers mood swings and names the child Winter after the name 'pops into her head'. The aliens attempts to find another person called Avril Lear are foiled when she is able to escape their attentions and, after examining the remains of Miracledog, they set off to find Moran.

=== Book 3: Olympus ===
- Originally printed in Miracleman (Eclipse Comics) #11–16; recoloured and reprinted in Miracleman (Marvel Comics) 11–16

The aliens attack Miracleman and learn of Winter. However Liz finds herself protected by the sudden appearance of Miraclewoman, who fatally injures one of the aliens. Calling a truce, they reveal themselves to be Qys, originators of the body-swapping technology used by Gargunza. As the Qys make arrangements, Miraclewoman tells Miracleman and Liz of her origin as Avril Lear, an off-the-book experiment of Gargunza's, who was able to fake her own death and lay low. Winter's existence changes the Qys' mission from destruction to alliance, and the Warpsmiths – a species whose bloc locked in a thousand-year cold war with the Qys – transport Miracleman and Miraclewoman to the planet of Qys. The result is that an observation base being built behind Earth's moon, manned by Miracleman and Miraclewoman as representatives of the Qys, alongside the Warpsmiths Aza Chorn and Phon Mooda. A sweep of Earth for other superhumans reveals the pyrokinetic Firedrake Huey Moon, who also joins the group. However, Liz grows weary of the unstable life the Morans now lead and, with growing awareness that Winter is manipulating her moods, leaves Mike. Her intelligence rapidly increasing, Winter also decides to leave – heading off to explore the universe. Losing his wife and daughter depresses Mike, who opts to carry out a form of ritual suicide, making a grave for himself and changing into Miracleman who – saddened but understanding – ceases using his change-word again.

Unknown to the assemblage, Kid Miracleman continues to torment Bates into releasing him. The boy resists until he is raped by bullies; unleashed, Kid Miracleman devastates London, killing most of the population in lurid ways, before Miracleman and his allies are able to confront him. In the resulting battle he easily bests Miraclewoman and batters Miracleman, even after Chorn is able to arrange for extra power to aid them. However, after unsuccessfully trying to warp Kid Miracleman into various buildings, Chorn strikes on the idea of warping debris inside the adversary's forcefield. Chorn is fatally wounded but while Kid Miracleman survives he is in tremendous pain and reverts to Johnny Bates. To prevent Kid Miracleman ever returning, Miracleman is forced to kill the boy.

Their existence now known to the world, Miracleman, Miraclewoman and their allies reshape Earth into a utopia. They are joined by the Warpsmith Kana Blur and the Qys Mors, and the group builds a huge palace named Olympus on the remains of London. Phon Mooda warps the planet's nuclear weapons into the Sun, while money is abolished. Deserts are made fertile and the ozone layer is repaired. All drugs are legalised, which combined with everything being free all but ends crime. Energy becomes sustainable and plentiful. A eugenics programme begins, with Miracleman offering his sperm to anyone who wants to birth a superbaby, and others being offered conversion to super-beings themselves. Big Ben and Miracledog are mentally altered until they can be released into society as heroes, with the former changing his name to British Bulldog. Mors creates an underworld below Olympus, using Qys technology to recover the spirits of the dead and house them in artificial bodies. The changes reach near-universal acclaim, and those who struggle to deal with the changes are offered therapy to help them. Miracleman and Miraclewoman finally consummate their feelings, having sex in the skies over England in full view of the public, while Winter returns to Earth.

A discordant note however is struck when Miracleman visits Liz, offering her the chance for superhuman conversion and to join them at Olympus. He is stunned when she immediately rejects the offer, noting his lost humanity as the price of his new godlike status. While he is unable to understand her feelings he is left bothered by her words.

=== Book 4: The Golden Age ===
- Originally printed in Miracleman (Eclipse Comics) #17–22; recoloured and reprinted in Miracleman by Gaiman & Buckingham: The Golden Age #1–6

Miracleman's utopia is in full swing and has had wide, lasting changes to society. He has largely withdrawn to the peaks of Olympus, where he meets with pilgrims who have scaled the heights of the gigantic palace. On 3 August 1987, a group of four set off; one named Cairo goes mad and eventually jumps off Olympus, believing he can fly; another named Taipek shoots Miracleman with no effect before killing himself. Another named Gwen wishes to have access to technology to allow her to draw skilfully, and Miracleman accedes. However, he refuses to help the other, a father after aid for his daughter Hope (brain-damaged in the attack on London), offering no explanation beyond a simple "No" before the audience abruptly ends.

In May 1990, windmill caretaker John Galloway recalls a 1988 visit from Miraclewoman, with the pair making love. He was obsessed with perfect beauty, having left his wife in his quest, but when the pair meet a second time Miraclewoman insists he have sex with her aged human form. Afterwards begins dating his former wife Anita again. School curriculums have also drastically changed, as have playground trends. Pupil Jackie becomes fascinated by a boy called Greg who identifies as a Bates – a nihilistic subculture who imitate Kid Miracleman and want him to return. After much goading he finally shows her a pedant he keeps bearing a crucifixion-like design depicting Kid Miracleman at the end of the battle in London.

On 1 May 1993, the sixth of the 17 Andy Warhol clones created by Mors in the underworld is charged with tending to the newly resurrected Gargunza. The pair talk about the new world above where neither can tread. Gargunza is visited by Winter and painted by Warhol, who is fascinated and enthralled with his charge. However six months later Warhol is fetched by Mors, who shows him Gargunza attempting to escape the underworld, having devised a portable machine to sustain him outside Mors' support field. Gargunza excoriates Warhol and Mors before he is deactivated, and the Qys shows Warhol that he has made myriad attempts to resurrect the scientist, modifying his personality each time. He finds that any attempt to curb Gargunza's evil side reduces his intelligence, but remains confident he can eventually find the right balance. 29 October is designated as Wintersday, a holiday to celebrate the superbabies. Ahead of the 1993 holiday, Rachel Cohn struggles with the challenges of raising her human child Glen alongside the effortlessly intelligent and capable superpowered Mist. Rachel reads them their favourite storybook, Winter's Tale. However she learns her partner is moving to Osaka, taking Glen with her; realising Mist will not need her, she is left feeling lonely.

Sandra Brown is secretly a spy in the city, reporting as "1860" and "Casablanca", and using the cover name Ruth Browning. She uncovers a more and more convoluted series of events as she discovers everyone she knows is spying on her or someone else, and none of them seem aware of what is happening. Finally seemingly driven mad, she flees to the city's boundaries where she meets the resurrected Evelyn Cream. He tells her the city is a facility to allow intelligence personnel to recover from their shadowy lives and habits, and that now she is ready to return to the world. She agrees and becomes a librarian in Bristol, forgetting about her secretive former life and entering a relationship with a woman called Ida – though she still has paranoid feelings. Jason Oakey finally loses his virginity to a girl from Nepal he met through Miraclewoman's matchmaking service. Talkative after intercourse, he tells his snoozing partner how he was lucky to avoid death in London. Jason had planned to visit London with best friend Garry Watts and his sister Sharon. However Jason was instead forced to change his plans and stay with his aunt in Hawking-on-Sea, inadvertently saving his life. Both the Watts siblings were killed by Kid Miracleman; while Sharon's remains are never identified Garry's body is impaled on a church steeple, and wind passing through his larynx makes it sound as if he is screaming. Garry's corpse is prominently featured in Veneer, a documentary on the London attack assembled by film-maker Stanley Kubrick. Jason also tells her of his meeting with Miracleman in Epping Forest, cringing over his naivety.

Hope's father, John, Anita, Jackie, Rachel, Mist, Sandra, Ida and Jason all attend a celebratory carnival in London on 22 August 1994, nine years after the return of Kid Miracleman. Rachel fasts before visiting the killing fields, a memorial area where the bodies of many of Kid Miracleman's victims have not been interred, and spends time with Mist before her and a group of superbabies leave Earth. Jason and his partner set up a stall for t-shirts which they give away, with Jackie selecting one featuring a juvenile Kid Miracleman. Anita and Ida go sightseeing. The group all end up asking questions of a Spaceman – including an incognito Miracleman, who asks the oracle if he is doing the right and seems to draw some comfort from the oblique reply. After Huey Moon triggers a fireworks display all attendees are given badges and balloons that allow them to fly over the city.

In 2003, With help from the Qys, Miracleman sends a probe sent into infra-space to take cell scrapings from the destroyed body of Dicky Dauntless, allowing a new clone of Young Miracleman to be grown and awakened.

=== Book 5: The Silver Age ===
- Originally partially printed in Miracleman (Eclipse Comics) #23–24; redrawn, reprinted and continued in Miracleman by Gaiman & Buckingham: The Silver Age

Miracleman and Mors complete the reawakening of Young Miracleman in Olympus in 2003, and is informed of the truth of his origins. He does his best to adapt to the world, but after Miraclewoman insists Miracleman acts on what she believes is Young Miracleman's homosexual attraction to his mentor the newcomer flees Olympus. He ends up in the Himalayas, joining a group on a pilgrimage to meet the former superhuman Caxton. Meanwhile, the Black Warpsmiths are growing concerned with Earth's lack of progress, while Miracleman is left troubled by his mis-reading of the situation with Young Miracleman.

== See also ==
- Miracleman: Apocrypha
