= Yarmouth Town Hall, Isle of Wight =

Municipal building in Yarmouth, Isle of Wight, England

Yarmouth Town Hall
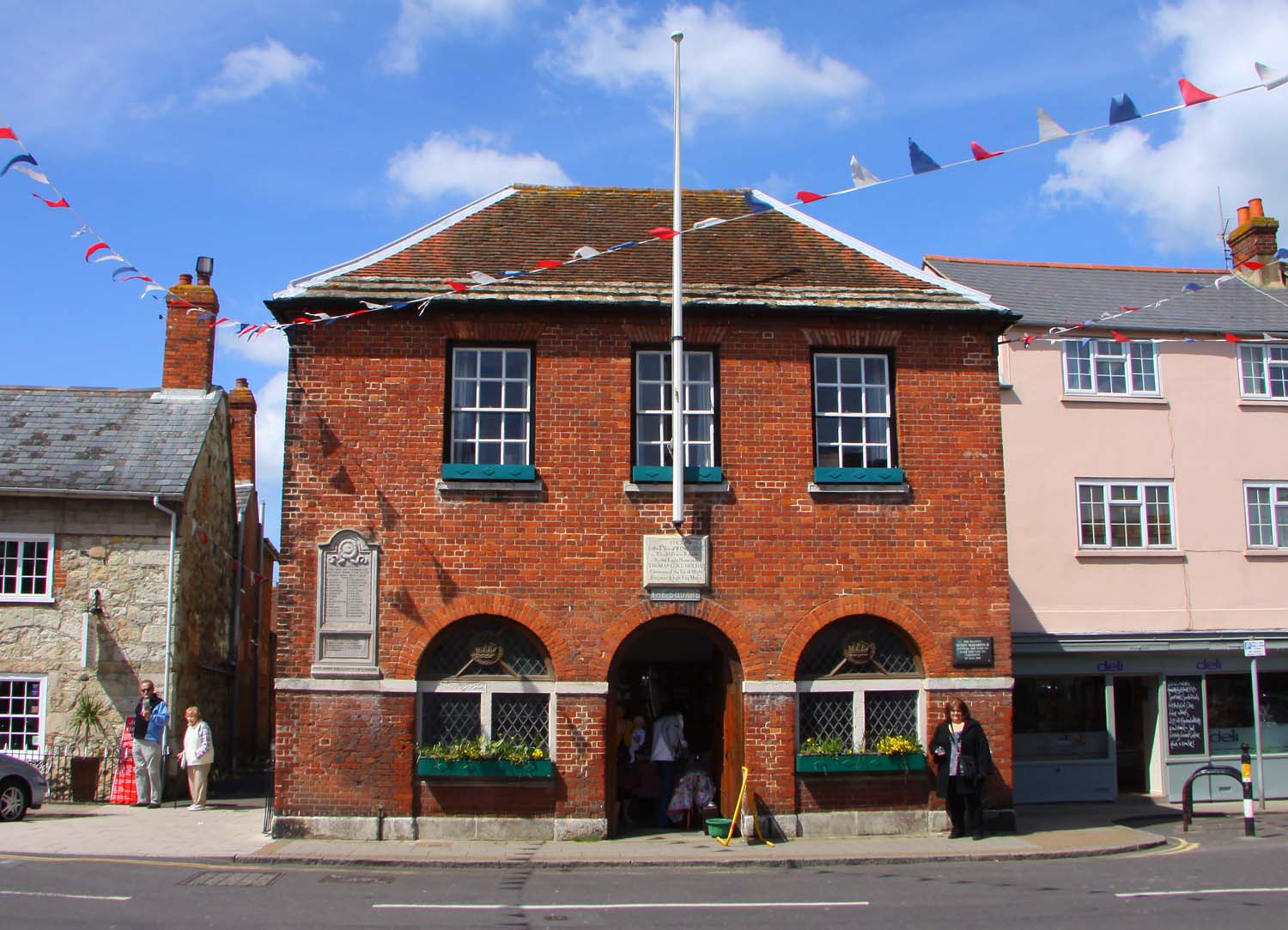
- Yarmouth Town Hall

- Shown on the Isle of Wight
- 50.7059°N 1.4995°W
- Location: The Square, Yarmouth

History
- Built: 1763

Site notes
- Architectural style: Neoclassical style

Listed Building – Grade II
- Official name: The Town Hall
- Designated: 21 July 1951
- Reference no.: 1292635

Yarmouth Town Hall is a municipal building in The Square in Yarmouth, Isle of Wight, England. The structure, which is used as a community events venue, is a Grade II listed building.

== History ==
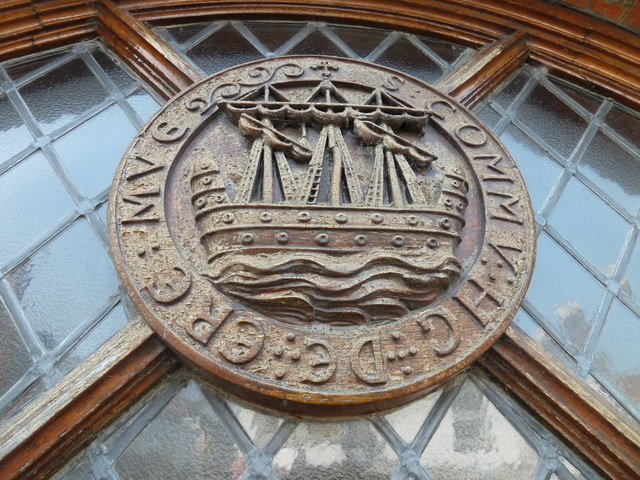
A carving in one of the ground floor windows

The town, which had been a borough since the Middle Ages, was dominated by two families, the Leigh and Holmes families, and had a medieval town hall which had become dilapidated and was in need of replacement. In the early 1760s, the burgesses were the mayor, Benjamin Leigh, and the member of parliament, Lord Holmes, who was also Governor of the Isle of Wight. In 1763, the two burgesses met and, it was agreed, having regard to the support Holmes had received from the borough for his election to parliament, that he should commission a new town hall and donate it to the town. (Note: Leigh and Holmes were also related by marriage: Benjamin Leigh's wife, Mary Leigh (née Troughear), had a brother who was married to Elizabeth Holmes, a sister of Lord Holmes.)

The building was rebuilt in the neoclassical style, using red brick and the work was completed later that year. It was arcaded on the ground floor, so that markets could be held, with an assembly room on the first floor. The design involved a symmetrical main frontage with three bays facing onto The Square; there were three openings on the ground floor and three sash windows on the first floor. Nikolaus Pevsner described the design as "austere".

Yarmouth had a very small electorate which, by the early 19th century, was dominated by one family (the Holmes family), which meant it was recognised by the UK Parliament as a rotten borough. Its right to elect members of parliament was removed by the Reform Act 1832 and the borough council, which had met in the town hall, was abolished under the Municipal Corporations Act 1883. The town hall was transferred to a new entity, the Yarmouth Town Trust, in December 1890 and subsequently became a venue for community events.

A plaque, designed by Frank Cooper of Newport to commemorate the lives of local service personnel who had died in the First World War was installed on the front elevation of the building and unveiled by Major-General J. E. B. Seely on 27 July 1924. Queen Elizabeth II, accompanied by the Duke of Edinburgh, visited the town hall during a tour of the island on 25 July 1965.
