= Isle of Wight National Landscape =

Coordinates: 50°41′N 1°17′W

The Isle of Wight National Landscape is an Area of Outstanding Natural Beauty (AONB) on the Isle of Wight, England's largest offshore island.

The AONB was designated in 1963 and covers 189 square kilometres, about half of the island, mostly near the south-west and north-west coasts but also including downland in the east. It also covers about half the coastline, including both the Hamstead and Tennyson Heritage Coast areas.

In 2019, the AONB was designated as a UNESCO Biosphere Reserve.

== Principal summits ==
The following hills within the National Landscape have at least 30 metres of topographic prominence:

Hill	Elevation	Prominence	Grid reference
St Boniface Down	242 m (794 ft)	242 m	SZ568785
St Catherine's Down	239 m (784 ft)	127 m	SZ493772
Appuldurcombe Down	226 m (741 ft)	91 m	SZ536796
Brighstone Down	213.7 m (701 ft)	150.6 m	SZ432847
Westover Down	203 m (666 ft)	78 m	SZ406847
Chillerton Down	167 m (548 ft)	61 m	SZ475834
Brook Down	164 m (538 ft)	69 m	SZ390852
Whitwell Hill	158 m (518 ft)	45 m	SZ520766
Chillerton Down S Top	148 m (486 ft)	33 m	SZ475826
Tennyson Down	147 m (482 ft)	145 m	SZ325853
West High Down	140.6 m (461 ft)	30.8 m	SZ306849
Grammar's Common	137 m (449 ft)	35 m	SZ415838
Arreton Down	135 m (443 ft)	108 m	SZ547872
Berry Hill	134 m (440 ft)	35 m	SZ484827
Brading Down	131 m (430 ft)	58 m	SZ585869
Ashey Down	130 m (427 ft)	32 m	SZ574875
Headon Hill	120 m (394 ft)	34 m	SZ312858
Bembridge Down	104.9 m (344 ft)	100.6 m	SZ625860
Rookley Hill	92 m (302 ft)	32 m	SZ504840
Cranmore Hill	62 m (203 ft)	39 m	SZ389908

== See also ==
- Western Yar
