= Yarmouth, Isle of Wight =

Port town on the Isle of Wight, England

Coordinates: 50.704°N 1.500°W

Yarmouth
- Town and civil parish
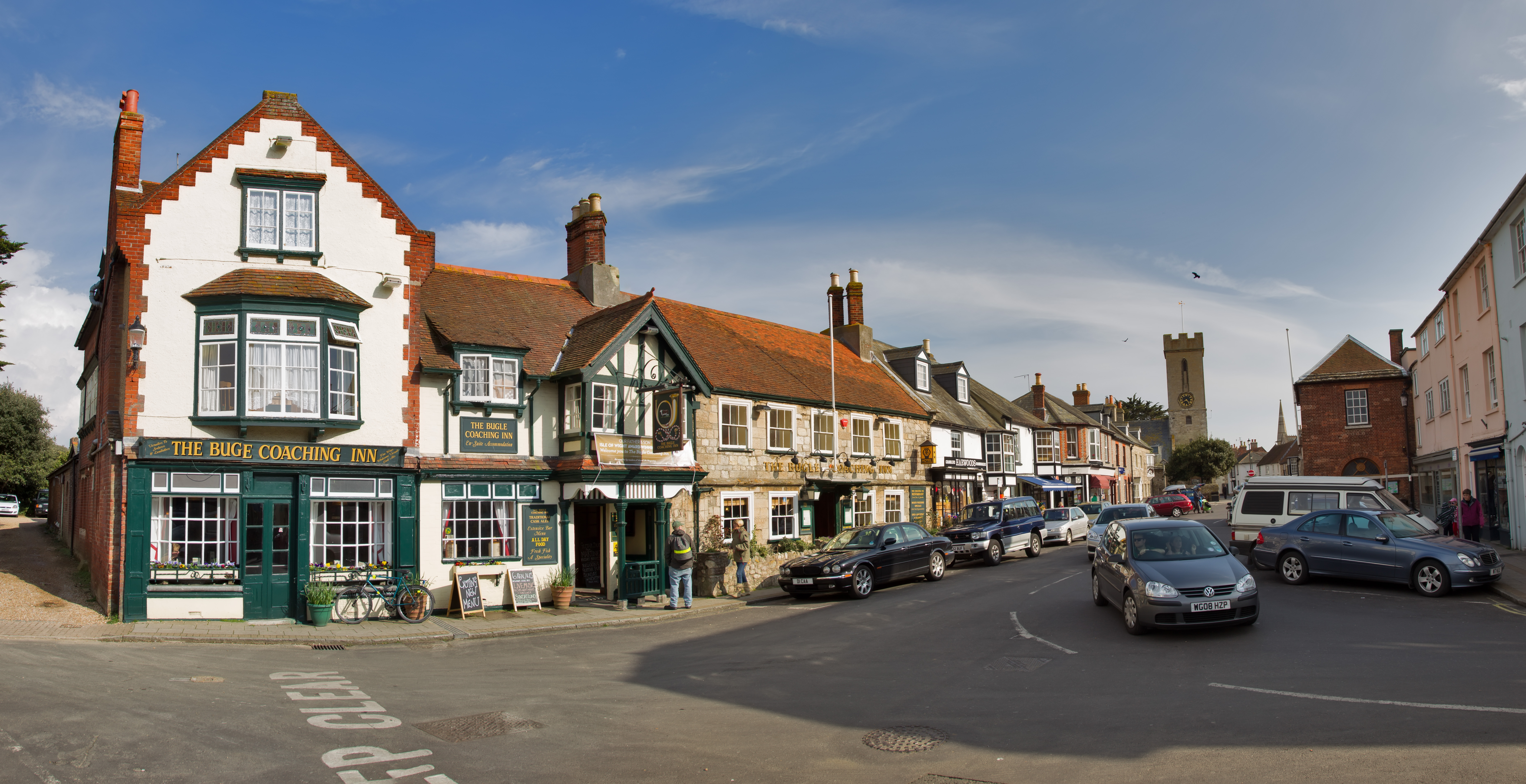
- Yarmouth town centre

- Location within the Isle of Wight
- Population: 724 (2021 census)
- OS grid reference: SZ356896
- Unitary authority: Isle of Wight
- Ceremonial county: Isle of Wight
- Region: South East
- Country: England
- Sovereign state: United Kingdom
- Post town: Yarmouth
- Postcode district: PO41
- Dialling code: 01983
- Police: Hampshire and Isle of Wight
- Fire: Hampshire and Isle of Wight
- Ambulance: Isle of Wight
- UK Parliament: Isle of Wight West

Yarmouth is a town, port and civil parish in the west of the Isle of Wight, off the south coast of England. The town grew near the river crossing, originally a ferry, which was replaced with a road bridge in 1863.

== Name ==
The name means 'the gravelly or muddy river mouth or estuary', from Old English ēaren and mūtha. The Western Yar river's name derives from Yarmouth, as is the Eastern Yar, from a lost place name.

Names of Yarmouth over time
Name	Date
991	Ermue
1086	Ermud
~1180	Hernemue
1223	Ernemuth
1299	Aremuthe
1302	Yaremuth

== History ==
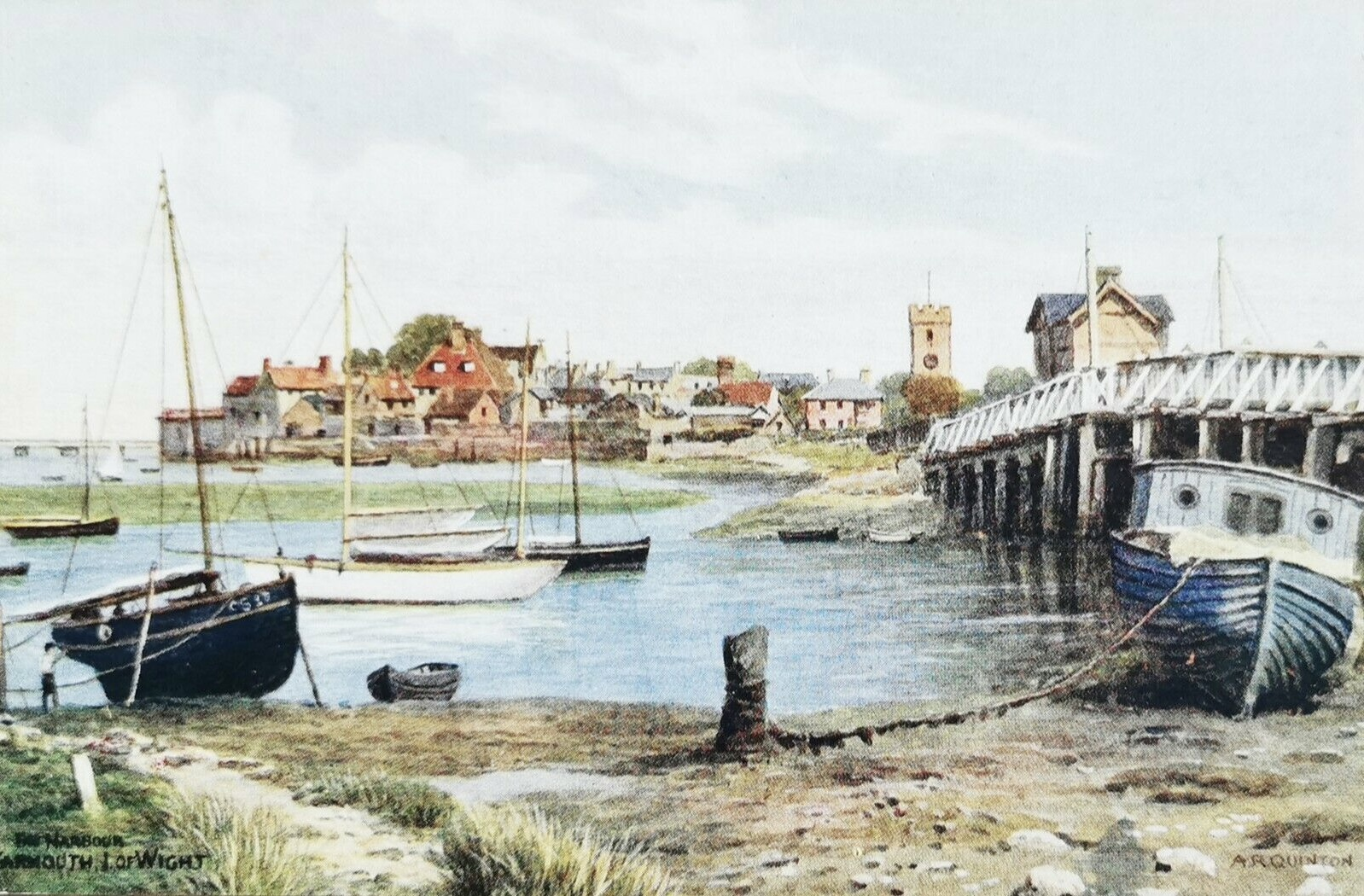
The Harbour, c. 1920, by A. R. Quinton

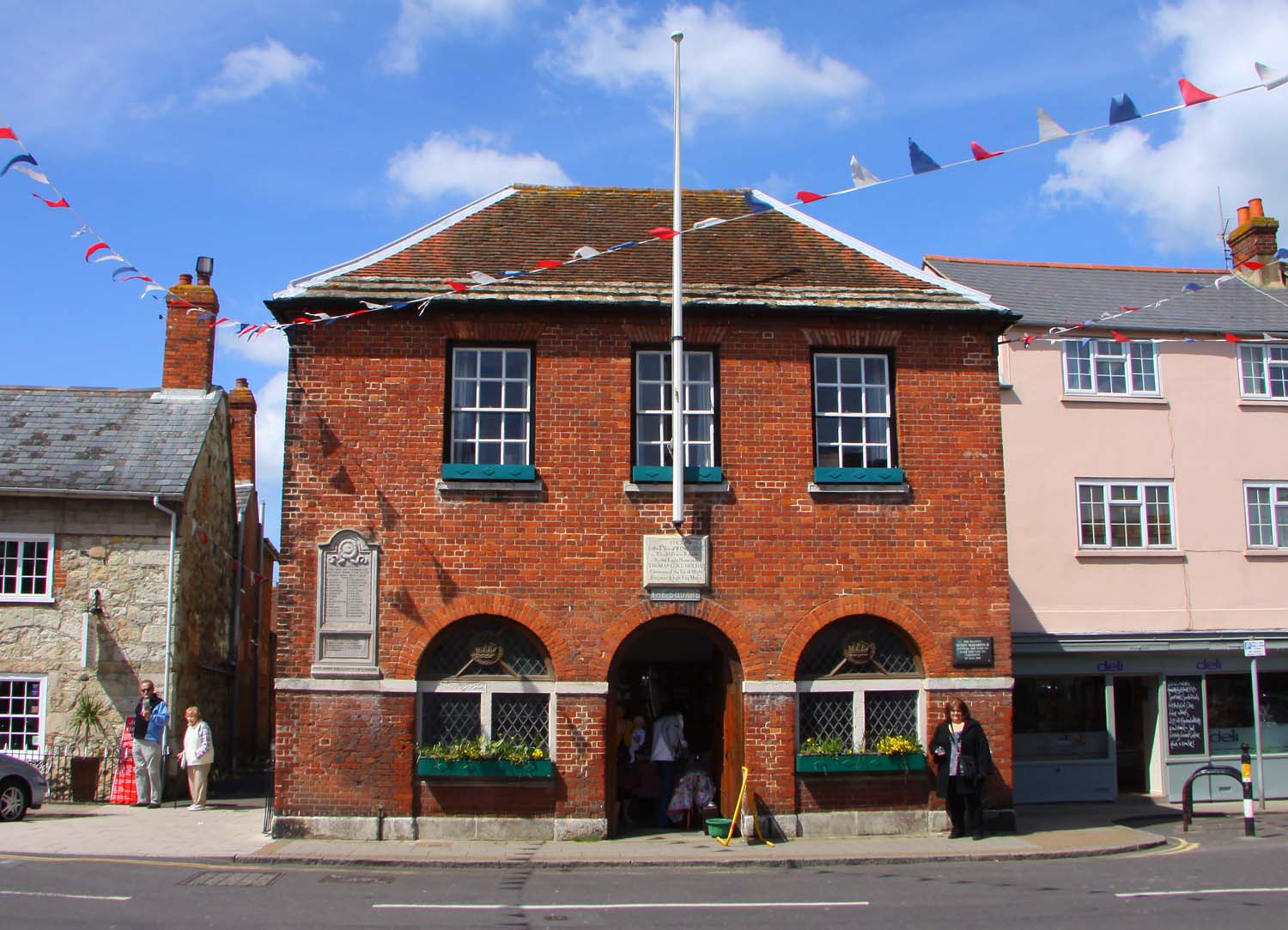
Yarmouth Town Hall

Yarmouth has been a settlement for over a thousand years, and is one of the earliest on the island. The first account of the settlement is in Æthelred the Unready's record of the Danegeld tax of 991, when it was called Eremue. The Normans laid out the streets on a grid system, a plan which can still be seen today. It grew rapidly, being given its first charter as a town in 1135. The town became a parliamentary borough in the Middle Ages, and the Yarmouth constituency was represented by two members of Parliament until 1832.

Until the castle was built, raids by the French hurt the town; in 1544 it was reputed to have been burned down. Legend has it that the church bells were carried off to Cherbourg or Boulogne.

Yarmouth Castle was built in 1547, and is now in the care of English Heritage. It is effectively a gun platform, built by Henry VIII to fortify the Solent and protect against any attempted invasion of England.

For many years Yarmouth was the seat of the Governor of the Island. Yarmouth Town Hall was built in 1763.

In St. James's Church, there is a monument to the 17th century admiral Sir Robert Holmes who was at Yarmouth. He obtained it in a raid on a French ship, when he seized an unfinished statue of Louis XIV of France and forced the sculptor to finish it with his own head rather than the king's.

In 1784, most of Yarmouth's ancient charters were lost: A ship's captain, drunk after a court dinner, stole what he thought was a case of wine, as he returned to his ship. When he discovered it was a case of books, he threw it overboard.

Matthew James Everingham, one of the Australian settlers, was from Yarmouth.

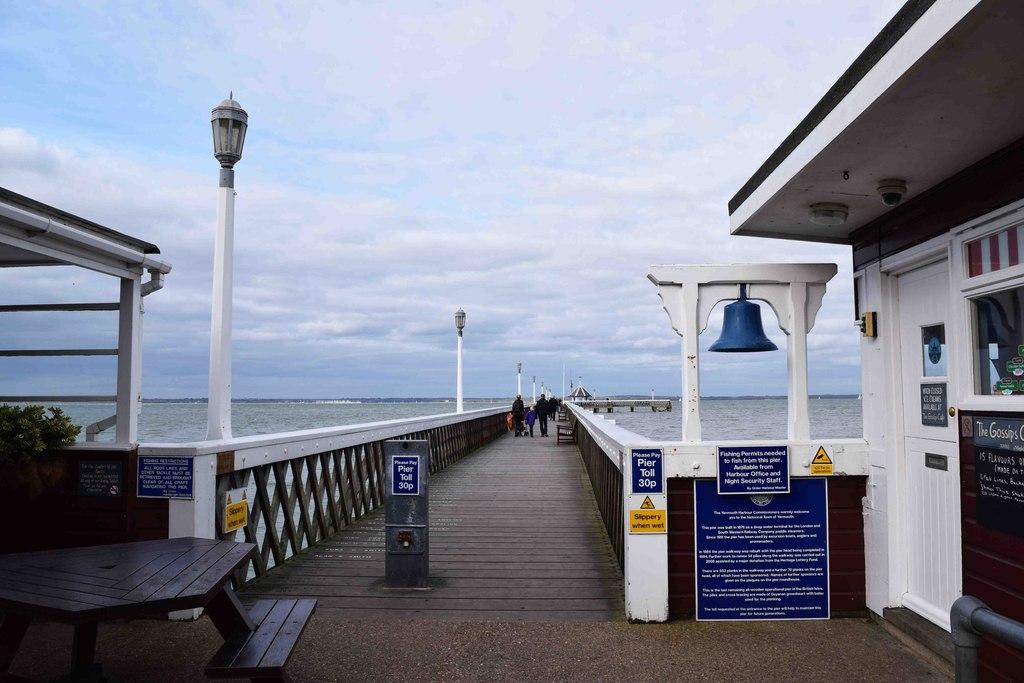
Entrance to Yarmouth Pier, Yarmouth, Isle of Wight (2014) by L S Wilson

Yarmouth Pier was opened in 1876. It received Grade II listed status in 1975. Originally 685 ft (207.5m) long, it's now 609 ft (186m) but is still the longest timber pier in England open to the public, and also a docking point for the MV Balmoral and PS Waverley.

Several Sites of Special Scientific Interest lie close to Yarmouth, including Yar Estuary SSSI & Bouldnor And Hamstead Cliffs SSSI.

== Commerce ==
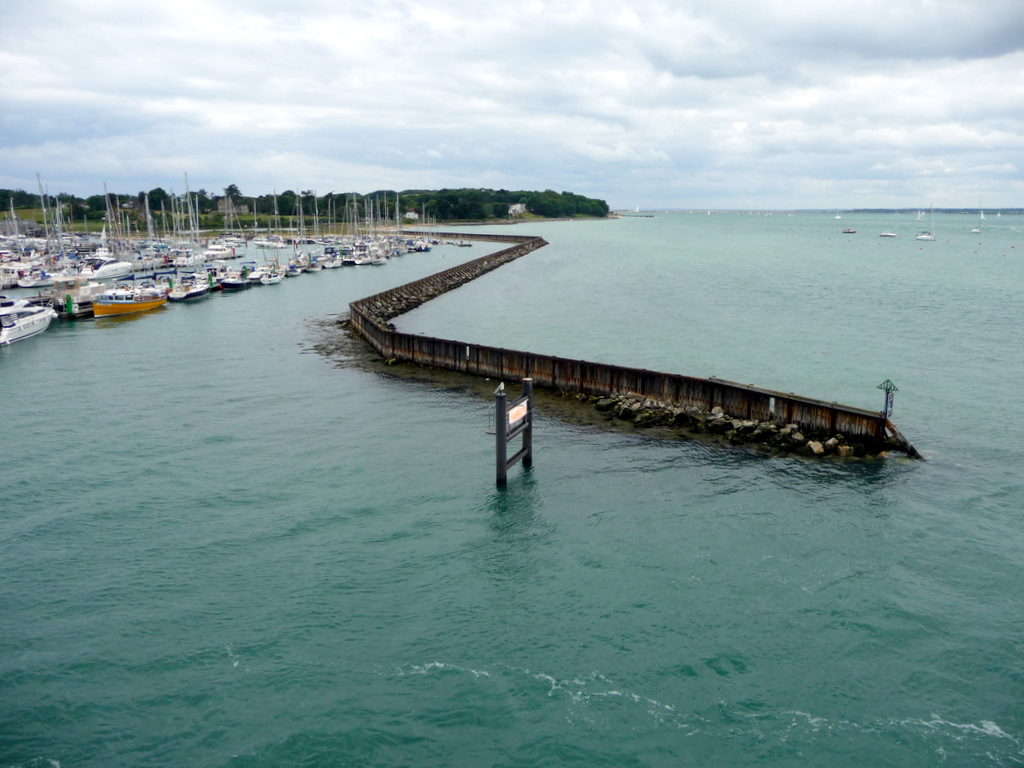
Yarmouth Harbour

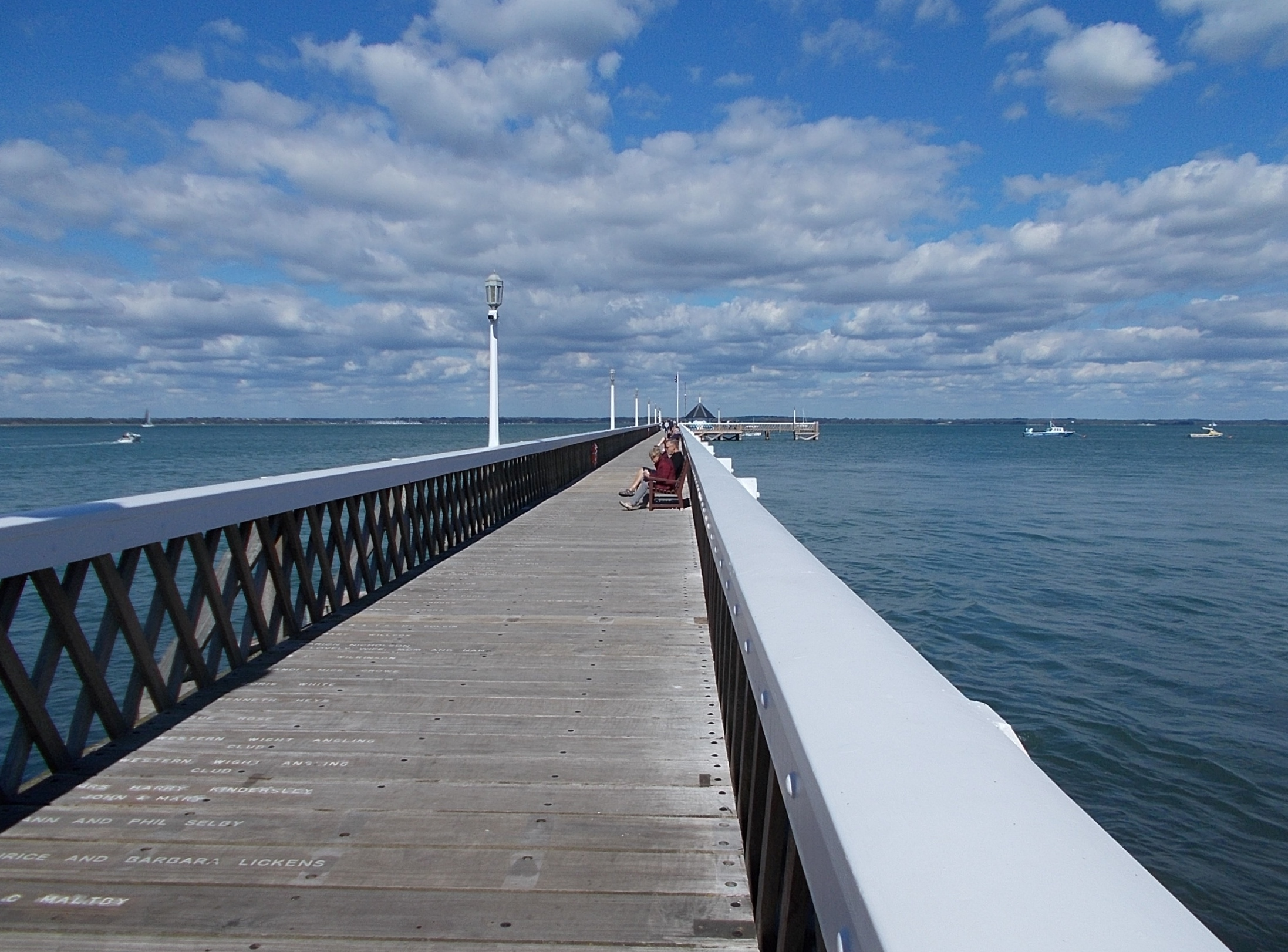
Yarmouth Pier

As a port and market town Yarmouth has had local commercial significance. It still has some boat yards and chandlery, and although relatively small it still supports a number of shops, hotels, pubs and restaurants, supported partly by passing trade from the ferry terminal and visiting boat owners.

== Transport ==
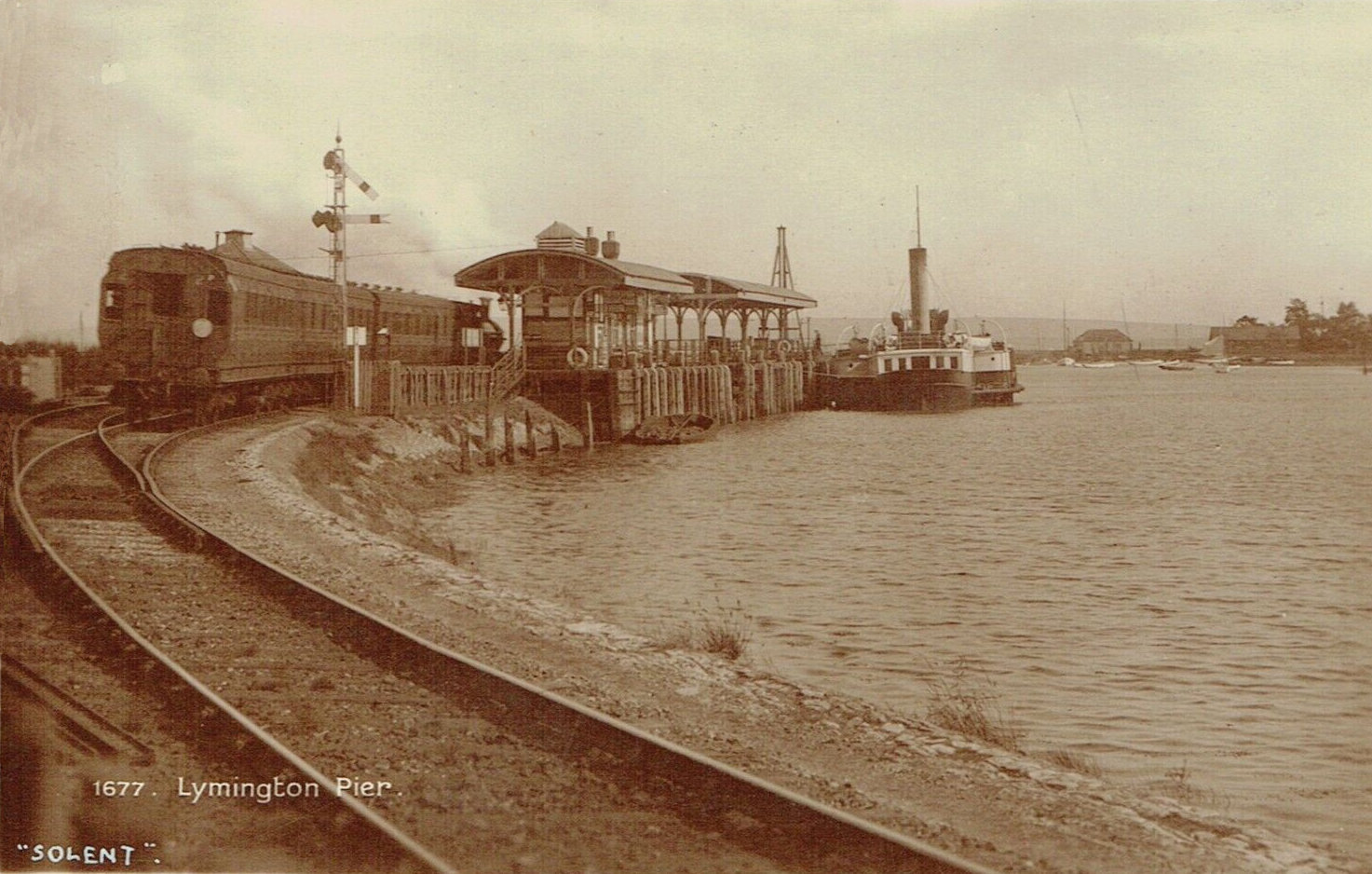
Passenger ferry Solent waiting at Lymington Pier in 1910 (postcard)

The Wightlink car ferry sails from Yarmouth to Lymington (Lymington Pier) in Hampshire.

Southern Vectis operate bus services from Yarmouth bus station, a small building near the ferry terminal, the main route being route 7 serving Totland, Alum Bay, Freshwater, Newport and Shalfleet as well as Yarmouth. To reach Yarmouth, route 7 uses Pixley Hill, which has caused some controversy amongst local residents who do not believe the road is large enough for buses. The controversy was initially started by former route 11 being extended to serve Yarmouth and using the lane in September 2008.

In the spring and summer, Southern Vectis also operate an open top bus called "The Needles Breezer" that runs through Freshwater Bay to Alum Bay and onto the Needles Battery down a bus and pedestrian-only road along the cliff edge; returning to Yarmouth via Totland and Colwell. For the more athletic, Yarmouth is on the Isle of Wight Coastal Path.

The parish was once served by Yarmouth railway station, with services to Newport. Passenger services ended in 1953, and the track has long since been removed; the trackbed between Yarmouth and Freshwater has been converted into a bridleway. In August 2014 the converted and expanded railway station opened as a restaurant.

== Size and population ==
Yarmouth is one of the smallest towns in the United Kingdom. The 2011 census reported the parish of Yarmouth having 865 usual residents. In 2001, the population was just 791 (compared with about 600 at the beginning of the 19th century).

Census population of Yarmouth, Isle of Wight parish
Census	Population	Female	Male	Households	Source
2001	791	424	367	421	
2011	865	449	416	434	
2021	724	384	340	404	

== Today ==
Yarmouth hosted the popular biannual Old Gaffers festival which included several days of entertainment and shows, but in September 2018 it was announced that the event would no longer be held.

Yarmouth marina is the landing point for the Royal Navy's Solent Amphibious Challenge, held in June each year.
