= Funtastic Journey =

Funtastic Journey was a comic strip that started in Jackpot from the first issue dated 5 May 1979. The artist throughout the comic strip was Ian Knox.

On their planet everyone lives in shoes and boots. A parody of 'The Old Lady Who Lived In a Shoe'. People even ate soles of shoes for food (boiled boot, fried boot, stewed boot or curried boot, with only slippers for a change). Instead of TV they had bootivision, but only in Black and Brown. Gavin & Terry are tired of this boredom and the terrible taste of boots. They visit and later join Professor Shoe, who has built a special helicopter-boot 'Welly Copter' to travel to distant lands and adventures.

On their first trip, in issue 1, they visit a land where everyone lives in socks and even eats socks. On a later trip, to a land where they find everything is floating, even the food. On another journey they find all the houses and buildings are made of food - but not for eating, as they discover to their cost.

Other trips include one to a land where they find everyone uses magic. On another they are one inches tall.
