= Ace Hart (comics) =

- Ace Hart on the cover of Super Thriller Comics #21.

Publication information
- Publisher: Foldes Press; World Distributors
- First appearance: Super Thriller Comic #6 (1948)

In-story information
- Alter ego: Ace Hart
- Species: Human
- Team affiliations: War Office; Department of Space Defence
- Partnerships: Jessie King; Val Venture
- Abilities: Flight; Super-strength; Invulnerability; Heat projection; Hypnosis

Ace Hart is a fictional British Golden Age comic book superhero. He first appeared in Super Thriller Comic #6, published by Foldes Press of Edinburgh in 1948. While the character was created in-house none of the creators were credited (a common practice in the British comic industry at the time) and have yet to be identified.

== Publication history ==
Ace Hart, billed as "the Atom Man", first appeared in the sixth issue of Foldes' Super Thriller Comic anthology comic. After ten issues the title and characters - including Ace Hart - were sold to World Distributors, which continued the title until #33, when it was retitled Western Super Thriller Comics in 1952, refocusing on western-themed strips imported from Dell Publishing.

Like the rest of the strips in the comic, Ace Hart was printed in black and white but made frequent appearances in colour on the magazine's cover. Subsequent to the strip's end the copyright on Ace Hart expired and the character fell into the public domain.

In 1989 the character made a guest appearance in Grant Morrison's 2000AD strip Zenith as one of a large number of multiversal superheroes battling the Lloigor, extensively redesigned by artist Steve Yeowell. Described by one character as one of "the most powerful crime-fighters on any alternative", Ace Hart is accidentally left behind on a doomed parallel along with fellow powerhouse Captain Miracle. Both are possessed by the Lloigor but are eventually destroyed by their erstwhile allies during an attempt to destroy Zenith's Earth.

The character made another brief return to print in the fourth volume of The League of Extraordinary Gentlemen in 2018. Within that comic's universe Hart was recruited by Harry Lime to lead a British Intelligence-backed super-team called the Victory Vanguard.

== Character Biography ==
Unlike many comic superheroes Ace Hart has no secret identity or even a detailed origin. Human scientist Ace Hart is able to give himself incredible powers through an elixir that allowed him to harness atomic power. He then created apparatus that allows him to monitor crime or be contacted by the War Office. Ace's adventures typically pitched him against kidnappers, racketeers, Nazis and occasional alien invasions. One recurring enemy was the foreign female criminal Zonda.

He was later joined by sidekick Jessie King, who he gave a version of his powers. From Super Thriller Comic #15 the strip's format was revised to put Hart under command of the Director General of the Department of Space Defence. The issue saw the debut of Valyra, an alien from Loma brainwashed into aiding another species called the Vaks invade Earth. After being freed from their control she helped Ace foil the attack and he gave her his elixir. Following this she became his regular sidekick, taking the title Val Venture.

== Powers and abilities ==
Similar to many superheroes of the period Ace Hart's appearance and abilities were heavily influenced by Superman. Ace can fly at tremendous speeds, survive easily in space, has super-strength, can project heat rays and is invulnerable. Unlike Superman he augments his abilities with a self-designed atomic ray gun and has little compunction about killing aliens - human criminals were typically delivered to the authorities.

Due to Ace's incredible powers the short strips - generally consisting of 8 page standalone stories - rarely feature any jeopardy for the hero, who is usually able to overwhelm the villains easily once he is made aware of their presence. Instead either Jessie, Val or a female guest character ends up in damsel-in-distress situations.
