= Wragg =

Wragg is a surname. Notable people with the name include:

- Arthur Wragg (1903—76), British illustrator
- Doug Wragg (born 1934), English soccer player
- Geoff Wragg (1930–2017), Racehorse trainer
- Harry Wragg (1902—85), British jockey and trainer
- Sir Herbert Wragg (1880—1956), British Conservative Party politician, Member of Parliament (MP) for Belper 1923–29 and 1931–45
- Kaye Wragg (born 1973), English actress
- Peter Wragg (1931—2004), English soccer player
- Ted Wragg (1938—2005), British educationalist
- Ulamila Kurai Wragg (born 1968), Fijian journalist
- Willie Wragg (1875—after 1904), English soccer player
- William Wragg, British Conservative Party politician, MP for Hazel Grove since May 2015

== See also ==
- E. Wragg & Son, Pipe organ builders
- Wragge, a surname
- Richie Wraggs (fictional)
