= Ivor Lott and Tony Broke =

British comic strip

Ivor Lott and Tony Broke was a British strip which originally appeared in the comic book Cor!! on 6 June 1970, before moving to Buster when the two comics merged in June 1974. The comic strip lasted until the final issue of Buster on 3 January 2000. The comic was originally drawn by Reg Parlett and later continued by artists such as Jim Crocker and Sid Burgon.

== Concept ==
The strips revolved around two boys who lived close to each other. Tony Broke (a pun on the English slang term "stony broke," meaning to have no money at all) was the penniless hero of the stories, living in Broke Cottage; while Ivor Lott (which sounds like "I've a lot") — a spoiled, rich snob — was the villain, living in Lott Hall. The format of the strips was usually the same; Tony would be enjoying himself with some simple, cheap toy or activity, and Ivor would show off with an incredibly expensive version of the toy, bullying his neighbour in the process. On other occasions Tony went up against Ivor's constant cheating at sports and games. In each strip, Tony would ultimately win out, by getting Ivor into trouble or by tricking him to break his own toy, for example. Or Ivor's over-extravagance in proving his superiority over Tony simply backfired, and Ivor was often punished by his father for this. A typical storyline had Tony playing with paper planes by himself, before Ivor appears with an expensive remote control model aircraft, shooting down Tony's planes. Tony would then paint a wall to camouflage it, making Ivor break his plane by flying it into the wall. On rare occasions Tony would be foiled by something beyond his power, such as having to cancel a cricket game on account of rain. Ivor then claims that is not an issue as he presents an expensive inflatable stadium. While it may have been useful for Tony and Ivor to continue playing, Ivor's lousy cricket skills cause the ball to fly through the roof, popping the stadium and resulting in him being chased by angry spectators. On a few, very rare, occasions, the strip would end with Tony being astonished at how much money Ivor was prepared to throw around: once, after spending vast amounts on a haircut, Ivor ended up literally having a single haircut.

The final issue of Buster included a page showing the ultimate fates of many of the comic's characters. In the case of Ivor and Tony, their roles were switched: Tony became rich thanks to his parents winning the National Lottery, while Ivor ended up broke after his father lost all his money investing in the Buster comic.

== Similarity with Milly O' Naire and Penny Less ==
A similar strip appeared in the comic Jackpot, but this time it features a pair of girls called Milly O' Naire and Penny Less (a play on the words 'millionaire' and 'penniless'). When Jackpot and Buster merged in 1982, the two strips merged as well: Milly became Ivor's girlfriend, while Tony preferred the more down-to-earth Penny. The girls would often behave the same way as their male counterparts; Milly attended an exquisite boarding school; then she is in shock to see Penny also attending, only her diligent study has awarded her a scholarship to the same private school.

== Parody ==
In the 1990s, the adult comic Viz ran a strip lampooning Ivor Lott and Tony Broke, which contained slightly more mature themes. For example, in one strip, the Ivor character boasts about the breast implant surgery that he has paid for his girlfriend to get.
