= Jackpot (British comics) =

British comic book magazine

Publication information
- Publisher: IPC Magazines Ltd
- Schedule: Weekly
- Genre: Action/adventure, horror, humor/comedy
- Publication date: 5 May 1979 – 30 January 1982
- No. of issues: 141 regular issues 3 summer specials 7 annuals

Creative team
- Artist(s): Jim Crocker; Mike Lacey; Steve Bell; Paul Ailey; Vic Neill; Tom Paterson; Reg Parlett; Robert Nixon; Rob Lee; Norman Mansbridge; Ken Reid; Ian Knox; Jim Petrie; Dicky Howett; Brian Walker; John Geering; Sid Burgon; Trevor Metcalfe; Nigel Edwards

Jackpot was a British comic book magazine that ran from the issues cover dated 5 May 1979 to issue 141, 30 January 1982, when it merged with Buster.

== Publishing history ==
The first issue cost 10p. The price increased to 12p from issue 63 (1980) and 14p from issue 98 in 1981

=== Free Gifts ===
Early issues included a cover-mounted free gift the first issue included a "practical joke", for example a joke chocolate biscuit. Issue 2 featured a Squirt Ring. Issue 3 bore a Magic Numbers card game and Why Be Bored? book covers. The inner pages of the latter continued for several issue after.

=== Annuals ===
Annuals were printed from 1980 to 1986 - as was often the case with British titles, these hardback books outlasted the weekly comic by some time. They mixed original and reprinted material, with much of the new material being drawn by different artists than the weekly strips due to the lower page rate paid to artists.

=== Summer Specials ===
Summer Specials were printed from 1980 to 1982, again mixing reprint material with new strips (which again featured different artists).

== Contents ==
=== Initial lineup ===
- Jack Pott: A one-page comic strip carried over from Cor!!, drawn by Jim Crocker. The title character was compelled to gamble on everything. The readers voted the story in the top ten for every published list - 2nd most popular strip, in issue 96 After Jackpot merged with Buster the strip continued until 22 October 1988.
- Richie Wraggs: drawn by Mike Lacey, Wraggs was on the cover of issue 1 and continued until issue 140. His best friend was a black cat called Lucky and the strip parodied elements of Dick Whittington. His character was from the country and had nowhere to live. This popular story was regularly voted into the top ten list by the readers. The 1982 Jackpot Special featured two new Richie Wraggs strips that were never printed in the issues.
- Gremlins: drawn by Steve Bell (later to find wider fame as The Guardian's resident political cartoonist). The gremlins were small furry blobs the size of a spider that were always breaking things right up until their last appearance in issue No. 103 The strip was voted 6th most popular strip by the readers in issue 19. The strip bore no relation to the film of the same name.
- Angel's Proper Charlies: A parody of TV show Charlie's Angels, seeing a character called Angel move to the same neighbourhood as three friends who compete for her attention. Voted seventh most popular strip by the readers in issue 11 and again seventh most popular strip by the readers in issue 19
- Adam and Eva: A parody of the biblical story Adam and Eve, drawn by Paul Ailey. The strip features a serpent who persuades the pair to eat apples for wisdom.
- Class Wars: drawn by Vic Neill, the strip featured a class of school pupils formed by a private school merging with a comprehensive school. The class consisted of groups known as the "toffs" from the former, led by Cyril, and "scruffs" from the latter, led by Herbert. The class' teacher always tried to find ways to help them get along. Other Toffs were Nigel and Fiona, and other scruffs included Gertie. Class Wars was one of the most popular stories and was voted 5th top strip by the readers in issue 11, 4th most popular in issue 19, 7th most popular in issue 96, 5th most popular in issue 116, 4th most popular in issue 124 and 5th most popular in issue 134. It continued in the pages of Buster after the merger, renamed Top of the Class.
- Cry Baby: drawn by Mike Lacey. The strip featured a girl called Tina, who would cry at the slightest thing - resulting in her tears filling up a room or even causing a flood.
- Full O' Beans: drawn by Tom Paterson. A boy becomes super strong when he eats a whole can of baked beans.
- Good News Bad News: drawn by Nigel Edwards. Half of the comic strip is titled Good News and the other half Bad News as the main character describes events of the day. It lasted until issue No. 102 The readers voted the story 9th favourite in issue 11
- It's A Nice Life: A two page comic strip, lovingly drawn by Reg Parlett. The main characters were neighbours: Stan and his wife Babs and two children chose to live "the good life" in a caravan growing their own food with their goat Dustbin and other animals, including chickens and pigs. Next door Olli, his snooty wife Maddie and son Roddy are always buying new gadgets and luxuries. The strip was voted regularly by the readers into the top ten story's and 4th favourite in issue 134. It continued in Buster until 30 April 1988
- Kid King: drawn by Robert Nixon. A boy becomes King of England. The strip continued in Buster until 1 October 1983.
- Laser Eraser: initially drawn by Rob Lee. A boy called Ernie finds an alien pen that can zap / teleport objects to Splod and his crew on the alien's ship. In later issues of Jackpot, Robert Nixon drew some stories. Voted favourite comic strip by the readers in issue 11 and tenth most popular strip by the readers in issue 96 The story continued in Buster until Ernie's adventures came to an end in Buster issue cover dated 10 September 1983. The character was unrelated to the Steve Moore/Alan Moore creation of the same name.
- Little and Large Lenny: drawn by Norman Mansbridge.
- Milly O' Naire and Penny Less: drawn by Sid Burgon. Milly is wealthy whilst Penny is poor. Although only voted third favourite story by the readers in issue 11, the girls were voted the top story for issue's 96, 116, 124 and 134. The strip, still drawn by Sid Burgon, later merged with the similarly-themed Ivor Lott and Tony Broke (from Cor!!) when they went to the same private school. Milly's father is left broke paying for her to go to the school, whereas Penny passed an exam to gain a scholarship. The strip continued in Buster until 20 September 1986,; the strip then reverted to the name Ivor Lott and Tony Broke though Milly and Penny did make the occasional appearances until 1987.
- The Terror Toys: an action comic strip, about toys that come to life after being created by an evil Toymaker. Voted favourite strip by the readers in issue 19 The adventures continued in a sequel strip, Return of the Terror Toys.
- Robot Smith: drawn by Ken Reid. The adventures of a robot boy called Robert Smith.
- Scooper: drawn by Tom Paterson. About a boy reporter.
- Funtastic Journey: drawn by Ian Knox, who like Steve Bell would later find greater fame as a political cartoonist. The strip detailed the adventures of two boys called Terry and Gavin with an eccentric professor, the trio travelling by Welly-Copter.
- The Incredible Sulk: drawn by Jim Petrie comic strip, parody of Marvel's The Incredible Hulk The slightest thing sends Sulk into a rage. The readers voted the strip 2nd favourite story in issue 11 and again in issue 19, by issue 116 he was voted 7th favourite.
- The Teeny Sweeney: Three young boys inspired by TV series The Sweeney solve schoolyard crimes, such as when someone's sweets have gone missing.

=== Later additions ===
- Robin Good: debuting in No. 36. A spoof of the Robin Hood legend about a boy who robs from the rich and gives to the poor set around 1200. His arch enemy is the Sheriff of Nottingham's son.
- The Amazing Three: drawn by Trevor Metcalfe and debuting in No. 23. An adventure strip concerning twins Craig and Sue Travers and their friend Sam Pacey, who use magic rings to transform into the superheroes Blue Magician, Tanya and Oakman in order to fend off the alien invader Vogler. The strip ran until No. 58.
- Jake's 7: drawn by Tom Paterson and debuting in No. 62. Jake and his six friends are sent into the future, where they still have school. (The title is a pun of the TV programme Blake's 7 but the strip itself is not a parody of the series. This strip predates the earliest official comics based on the TV show.)
- The Winners: drawn by Mike Lacey and debuting in No. 75 The Winner family always won any competitions they entered. The strip was a popular addition, with readers voting it 3rd favourite in issue 96. By issue 134 they were the 2nd favourite story. The strip continued into the mid-1990s in Buster (now drawn by Jimmy Hansen), making it the longest running of all the Jackpot comic strips.
- Fiends and Neighbours: a reprint comic strip that had previously run in Cor! and would later appear in Scream!, starting from issue 101
- Will Power: drawn by Nigel Edwards, debuting in No. 103.
- The Park: drawn by Tom Paterson and debuting in No. 107, drawn by Tom Paterson continued in Buster. A park keeper called Parky does not like other people using his park. His assistant is called Dogsbody. Other park regulars include Colonel Windbag and his butler Dithers; Barbara Woodshed and her dog Humphrey; and Nanny and her baby. The strip continued in Buster after the merger until 26 May 1984. before also being discontinued to make room for School Fun material. Despite a similar premise, the strip was not related to the Viz strip The Parky.
- The Gold Rush: drawn by Dicky Howett. Two rival treasure hunters Giles and Cad travel the world in search of gold; their quest ended in issue 86.
- Mike's Bike: drawn by Brian Walker. A boy named Mike disturbs a professor's robotic experiments, resulting in his bike becoming capable of thought and able to customise itself. It was oted 10th most popular strip by the readers in issue 134 The strip continued in Buster, where the bike had a make-over - becoming more like a mountain bike in appearance. The last episode appeared in Buster on 26 May 1984 before making way for some of the strips from the merged School Fun.
- The Invisible Monster: drawn by Sid Burgon and reprinted from Monster Fun from issue No. 131 An invisible monster befriends a young boy.
- Oh, Brother!: two constantly bickering brothers.
- The Perils of Pauline: an action strip about a girl at boarding school. One of the teachers is attempting to kill her, and Pauline and the readers had to work out who this was with a new clue each week, in a similar fashion to Lion strip Spot the Clue with Zip Nolan.
- Mum's the Word: a family where the mother always has the last word, leaving her husband always worst off.
- Sherlock Jnr.: Sherlock Holmes as a school boy, with his own Watson as assistant.
- Shrimp: A reprint comic strip, featuring a boy known as Shrimp who was under a metre tall.
- Sporty: Drawn by John Geering, and featuring a sports-obsessed Afro-Caribbean character as the lead, which was unusual for comics of the time. The strip was voted 7th Favourite in issue 134 and continued in Buster after the merger until 26 May 1984, when it was another discontinued to make space for the influx from School Fun. Curiously a character with the same name and premise had been part of the line-up for IPC's Krazy and had transferred to 'Whizzer and Chips, where it ran until 1986 - leading to the unusual situation where two strips sharing the same but otherwise unconnected were simultaneously published in two different comics by the same publisher.
- Count Mysto's Maze: an action strip about Pete and Johnny. who were guests of Count Mysto - each week they and the readers had solve puzzles.
- Time Trip
- Big Bear

== Reprints ==
In the 1980s and 1990s most of the comic strips were reprinted, though IPC had a policy of waiting five years before beginning reprinting old comic strips. Big Comic Fortnightly began reprinting selected Jackpot material, including episodes of Incredible Sulk, Full o' Beans, Scooper, Cry Baby, Top of the Class, Jack Pott, Sporty, Kid King and Gremlins in the mid 1990s
