= The Amazing Three =

Comic strip

- The cover to Jackpot #23, featuring the Amazing Three: (l-r) Tanya, Oakman, Blue Magician

Publication information
- First appearance: Jackpot #23 (October 1979)
- Created by: Trevor Metcalfe

In-story information
- Base(s): Newton City; Orbiting HQ
- Member(s): Blue Magician; Tanya; Oakman

The Amazing Three was a comic strip appearing in the British comic Jackpot from 1979 to 1980. While most of the rest of Jackpot consisted of humour strips The Amazing Three was closer to adventure material, though artist Trevor Metcalfe eschewed a realistic look for the artwork

== Publishing history ==
Debuting in the 6 October 1979 issue of Jackpot, the strip ran for a total of 36 episodes. Initially the strip ran across two opposite pages in full colour; a few later episodes were only a single page while the final pair were in a reduced triple colour palette of black, white and red. Unusually the first four episodes started the story in medias res, with the origin of the group's powers only appearing in the fifth episode. The strip returned for the 1982 Jackpot Annual.

In 1989 the characters made a guest appearance in Grant Morrison's 2000AD strip Zenith as one of a large number of multiversal superheroes battling the Lloigor. All three were redesigned by artist Steve Yeowell to fit in better with the contemporary style of the comic. The characters were not referred to as "The Amazing Three" and Blue Magician was called Blue Wizard, all three made frequent appearances in the story, being vital in defeating the Lloigor-possessed former heroes Mr. Lion and Mr. Unicorn. Tanya was killed near the close of the battle when the similarly possessed Captain Miracle punched her in the face hard enough to decapitate her. After the defeat of the Lloigor's plans Blue Magician blasted rocks out of the Antarctic permafrost to make a monument to those killed in the war.

== Fictional biography ==
Aware that the renegade Vogler was planning to invade Earth, the people of Zorr send magic rings to a trio of humans from the fictional Newton City, near the site the criminal landed – Craig Travers, his twin sister Sue and their friend Sam Pacey. Any one of them calling out or even writing "We will be transformed by the rings of Zorr!" turned the trio into their superhuman forms – Blue Magician, Tanya and Oakman respectively. The trio faced off against Vogler's invasions, which utilised both alien machinery and monsters, including an army of robot duplicates of himself and a pink spray that turned anyone it touched into frog-like creatures. During their first battle with the alien the trio were forced to briefly return to their human forms in order to free Oakman from hypnosis and as a result were identified. In order to operate freely they use their powers on space debris to fashion an Orbiting HQ above Earth. The Amazing Three were occasionally aided by Inspector Burke of Newton City's police department. While they were able to foil Vogler's various schemes they were never able to imprison the villain for long until the final strip, which saw Vogler accidentally use his Time Gun to revert himself to a baby, at which point the Amazing Three returned him to Zorr's nursery.

== Powers and abilities ==
- Blue Magician: Craig's superhuman identity has a magic cane which possesses a large number of abilities, including transmutation and energy blasts. In practice it can effectively do anything the Blue Magician thinks it can do, including act as a guidance system, to allow the trio to travel in space without need of oxygen. While unlike his team-mates he cannot fly the Blue Magician uses the cane to create a platform that allows him to levitate.
- Tanya: Sue's transformation turns her into the flying, super-strong warrior Tanya, who wears a Roman-style helmet. In addition to her strength, speed and flight she can fire lasers from her fingertips.
- Oakman: the superhuman form of Sam incredibly strong and durable, able to shrug off bullets, and resembles an oak tree. Despite his imposing physical form Oakman can fly. While both Sam and Oakman are lacking in intelligence they make up for it in determination.
