= Gunfire (character) =

- Gunfire taken from the cover of Gunfire #0 (September 1994). Art by Ed Benes.

Publication information
- Publisher: DC Comics
- First appearance: Deathstroke Annual #2 (October 1993)
- Created by: Len Wein (writer); Steve Erwin (artist)

In-story information
- Alter ego: Andrew Van Horn
- Species: Metahuman
- Team affiliations: Blood Pack
- Abilities: Agitation of particles to either cause objects to explode or fire energy projectiles

Gunfire (Andrew Van Horn) is a DC Comics superhero and freelance anti-terrorist operative. He first appeared in Deathstroke Annual #2 (October 1993), created by Len Wein and Steve Erwin, and was one of the "New Bloods", several superpowered individuals introduced during the 1993 DC Comics Bloodlines crossover event.

== Fictional character biography ==
During the Bloodlines crossover, Venev, an alien parasite, emerges in Paris and senses power nearby in the form of Deathstroke. She follows him to the Van Horn company building, and on the way attacks and kills the owner of the company. Andrew Van Horn, the man's son, is also attacked and seemingly killed.

Andrew soon awakens and, realizing that a creature is inside the building is killing his employees, creates a suit of technological armor and follows the trail of bodies. He encounters Deathstroke whom he attacks, thinking him responsible for the carnage, although both men fail to hurt each other due to their body armor. In the course of the battle, Andrew discovers that he has gained the ability to manipulate kinetic energy and attempts to use them on Deathstroke. Both men soon come to an understanding and head off to battle Venev.

Soon after this incident, Andrew's connection with the aliens draws him to Metropolis, where veteran superheroes are battling the creature that the parasites have brought forth. Andrew works with dozens of other 'New Bloods', people who have acquired powers when attacked. Eventually, the superheroes are freed and the aliens destroyed.

As Andrew Van Horn takes over his family company, he quickly learns his father had profited from weapons sales to terrorists, whom he starts working to neutralize, which leads him into conflict with'Dominion, a former employee of his father's business. Dominion runs a group called the Oblivion Front, but Gunfire soon ends its operation.

In Infinite Crisis, Gunfire battles the Secret Society of Super Villains during their attack on Metropolis, during which Prometheus cuts off his hands.

In Final Crisis, Gunfire is seen with dozens of other forgotten heroes in a self-described 'Limbo', where no stories happen. They are rescued by Superman and a dimension-crossing ship. Later, all of them assist against the cosmic threat of Mandrakk.

In Heroes in Crisis, Gunfire is among the patients of the Sanctuary therapy center who are killed in an unexpected attack. It is later revealed that the hero Gold Beetle replaced all of the dead heroes with clones from the 31st century and that they are all alive.

== Other versions ==
- Gunfire's eyepiece survived into the far future, appearing in Hitman One Million. The eyepiece is found by an unnamed man, who proceeds to die after accidentally using his powers on himself. John McCrea, who illustrated the issue, describes Gunfire as "one of the junk-er characters to come out of Bloodlines", stating that he "told Garth [Ennis] many, many times that [McCrea] hated Gunfire, because it's a terrible, terrible concept".
- In The New 52, police officer Blake gains similar abilities to Hitman after being infected by an alien parasite. He and a couple of other Pine Ridge occupants are drawn together by a mysterious stranger who knows of the terror surrounding their current happenstances. Blake succumbs to the parasite's infection just as he and the others breach the hive of the mother parasite. Haley is forced to kill him by ripping out his own extraterrestrial leech with her power.

== Powers and abilities ==
Gunfire is able to turn anything he touches into a gun, doing so by agitating atoms within an object in order to discharge its molecular mass as concussive energy bullets. Once its mass has been spent, the item can no longer maintain structural integrity, crumbling to ashes scant moments afterward. Inorganic objects last longer than biological ones and the denser or larger objects contribute more bullets or greater energy discharge upon release. If Gunfire attempts to use an object without a defined topological focal point (i.e. perfect sphere like a snowglobe), it would become a timed explosive, like a hand grenade.

Officer Blake's parasite-derived abilities enable him to turn anything he touches into a volatile material energy state. Once transformed, most objects he uses his power on can be converted into raw destructive force. He can either dial the energy back or let it run its course wherein said alternated element explodes.
