= Lloigor (disambiguation) =

Lloigor may refer to a fictional character in the Cthulhu Mythos:

- Lloigor (Great Old One), the air elemental from "The Lair of the Star Spawn" (1932) by August Derleth and Mark Schorer
- Lloigor (Cthulhu Mythos race), invisible psychic beings from "the Return of the Lloigor" (1969) by Colin Wilson

== See also ==
- Lloigoroth, a Marvel Comics character
- Lloegyr, the medieval Welsh name for a region of Britain
- Lloegr, the Welsh name for England
