= Milly O' Naire and Penny Less =

British comic strip

Milly O'Naire and Penny Less was a British comic strip created by Sid Burgon for the first issue of Jackpot on 5 May 1979.

The comic strip centred on a snobby rich girl, Milly O'Naire, and a poor girl, Penny Less. It has often been compared to Ivor Lott and Tony Broke, a strip originally from Cor!! and subsequently Buster when they merged in 1974. When Jackpot and Buster merged in 1982, the two strips merged as well, giving us the longest Fleetway strip title ever seen: "Ivor Lott and Tony Broke with Milly O'Naire and Penny Less": Milly became Ivor's girlfriend, while Tony preferred the more down to earth Penny. The girls would often behave the same way as their male counterparts. In September 1985 that twisting title was cut down to size, dropping the girls name altogether - though they still starred in the strips.
