= Hitman characters =

Hitman characters may refer to:

- Characters of the DC Comics Hitman franchise
- Characters of the Hitman video game franchise
