= Whacky =

1970's British comic strip

Whacky was a British comic strip published in the British comic book magazine Cor!! and ran in the comic from its first issue on 6 June 1970 until 29 September 1973 - some 9 months before it was merged with Buster. It started as a half page strip but proved popular and was given a full page several weeks later. It was created and drawn by Mike Lacey.

== Concept ==
The strip is about a fictional schoolboy called Whacky who is regularly being whacked (slang for "beating" or "thrashing") - later issues used the tag-line "He's always getting whacked" to emphasise the point. Most of the strips were school based and involved Whacky getting into trouble with his sadistic teacher Mr Thwackery - while these situations would typically involve lateness, talking in class etc., many times his teacher would find any excuse for regularly punishing him (even if Whacky is not at fault), which he often noticeably revelled in. His punishments were mostly the traditional "six of the best" with the cane - though in its absence other items would be used including an umbrella, slipper, plank, tree branch, walking stick, plimsoll, stick of rock, belt and book! At the time, the cane was still used in many British schools and coincided with the revival of the Jimmy Edwards TV show Whacko so this sort of behaviour was deemed perfectly innocent, as were the regular slipperings that Dennis The Menace received.

In one strip Whacky reasons how he got his name: that when he was first born the nurse smacked him on his rear!

The character was typically dressed as an old fashioned schoolboy: blazer (when in colour it would either be green, orange or red), matching cap, shirt and tie and school shorts, even in the winter. When not at school he usually wore a sweater; however, he still sported his school uniform shorts. He also carried the obligatory satchel to school.

The strip ended in the comic in 1973 with Mr. Thwackery's retirement. A jubilant Whacky races out of school, convinced he will not be punished any more, but on the way home he kicks a football into his new neighbour's garden - who happens to be Mr. Thwackery. He duly chases the lad over fences, cane in hand, with Whacky exclaiming "Will it never end...?"

== Continuation ==
The strip continued in the Cor!! summer specials and annuals that were still published into the early 1980s finishing with an appearance in the 1984 annual (published Christmas 1983) where Whacky walks into school to be greeted by a sign on the noticeboard exclaiming "No Whackings allowed" - mirroring real life as corporal punishment was being banned in England. Mr. Thwackery manages to punish Whacky "by accident" (opening a door onto him and dropping a desk lid on him as he is bent over) before he manages to whack the headmaster by mistake. The final frame showing Mr. Thwackery being whacked by the headmaster, with Whacky watching on...!
