= Bloodlines (comics) =

1993 DC Comics story arc

- Bloodbath #1 starring the Justice League, art by Ed Hannigan.
- Publisher: DC Comics
- Publication date: 1993
- Genre: Science fiction, superhero; Crossover
Title(s)
"Outbreak"
Lobo Annual (vol. 2) #1
Superman: The Man of Steel Annual #2
Batman: Shadow of the Bat Annual #1
The Flash Annual (vol. 2) #6
The New Titans Annual #9
Superman Annual (vol. 2) #5
Green Lantern Annual (vol. 3) #2
Batman Annual #17
Justice League International Annual #4
"Earthplague"
Robin Annual (vol. 2) #2
Action Comics Annual #5
Legion of Super-Heroes Annual (vol. 4) #4
Green Arrow Annual (vol. 2) #6
Detective Comics Annual #6
Justice League America Annual #7
The Adventures of Superman Annual #5
Hawkman Annual (vol. 3) #1
"Deathstorm"
Deathstroke, the Terminator Annual #2
Eclipso Annual #1
Demon Annual #2
Batman: Legends of the Dark Knight Annual #3
Team Titans Annual #1
L.E.G.I.O.N. '93 Annual #4
"Bloodbath"
Bloodbath #1-2

Creative team
- Writer(s): ("Bloodbath" only); Dan Raspler
- Penciller(s): ("Bloodbath" only); Chuck Wojtkiewicz; Sal Velluto
- Inker(s): ("Bloodbath" only); Agop Gemdjian; Jeff Albrecht; Del Barras
- Colorist(s): ("Bloodbath" only); Stuart Chaifetz

"Bloodlines" is a 1993 comic book story arc published by DC Comics. It was an intracompany crossover that ran through DC's superhero annuals and concluded with a two-issue Bloodbath miniseries written by Dan Raspler. The antagonists were a race of monstrous dragon-like aliens who killed humans for their spinal fluid. A small fraction of the parasite's victims survived and became super-heroes via their ordeal. This plot device introduced a wave of "New Blood" superheroes into the DC Universe. Seven DC Comics series were spun out of the event: Blood Pack, Razorsharp and the Psyba-Rats, Hitman, Anima, Loose Cannon, Argus and Gunfire.

== Publication history ==
The villains of the crossover were the formerly imprisoned survivors of a race of alien parasites named Angon, Gemir, Glonth, Lissik, Pritor, Venev, and Slodd that could shapeshift into humanoid forms. They commonly kill others by feeding on their spinal fluid, which can awaken superhuman powers in the recipient.

Each of the annuals involved in the crossover used this plot device to introduce a new super-powered character to the DC Universe. The Bloodlines crossover event spanned 23 of DC's regular titles and wrapped up in the two-part miniseries Bloodbath, in which the alien parasites sacrificed themselves to birth a gigantic alien known as the Taker. Many long-term heroes were absorbed into the monster, only to be saved by the heroes the parasites had created.

This series spun off into the Blood Pack miniseries. Gunfire also had a short-lived series. Some of the characters introduced in Bloodlines were killed in Infinite Crisis.

The only New Blood character to succeed as an independent property was Hitman, who first appeared in 1993's Demon Annual and went on to star in a solo ongoing series from 1996 to 2001 written by Garth Ennis and drawn by John McCrea.

Hitman and JLA/Hitman both acted as sequels to Bloodlines. The first had the CIA trying to duplicate the power-giving effects of the parasites. The second, set chronologically earlier, had a separate breed of Bloodlines parasites. JLA/Hitman also had a scene showing the White House taking the Bloodlines parasites as so big a threat that they were willing to launch nuclear missiles at the Justice League to prevent the parasites from reaching Earth again.

=== Parasites return ===
A new group of parasitic aliens from the same universe infiltrated a space shuttle returning to earth. When the JLA sent Green Lantern to investigate, his ring's readings showed that these parasites had genetic similarities with the Bloodlines parasites. These aliens, however, were much smaller and permanently attached themselves to their human hosts. They controlled their hosts' minds, could communicate telepathically, and gave each non-superpowered host a superpower. These new parasites managed to take control of, or incapacitate, the Justice League on the moon. In order to stop them from reaching Earth, Hitman had to kill or maim several of the astronaut hosts. While some members of the JLA felt that this was murder, others recognized that Hitman stopped the invasion in the only way that he could.

Another parasite, alone, is found by the Outsiders in a Gotham City club, being held captive, and admission charged for those wishing to gain superpowers. As the parasites only activate the metagene in a number of humans, most customers do not survive the ordeal. Although the ending of Batman and the Outsiders #10 had the parasite flying off into the night with Batman on its back trying to bring it down, the story was interrupted by the Batman R.I.P. event, leaving the parasite's story unresolved.

== New Bloods ==
The Blood Pack from Blood Pack #1, artist Christopher Taylor.

Some of the characters whose metagenes were activated by the parasites are Argus, Loose Cannon, Razorsharp, Terrorsmith, Hitman, and Gunfire. If too much parasite venom was absorbed by the host's system it would cause hideous abnormalities, as seen with Terrorsmith. The mother alien known as the Taker was destroyed with the help of all the human New Bloods. Pax helped banish these aliens by sealing them up in the other-dimensional home of the Taker.

=== List of New Bloods ===
The superhumans whose powers were awakened by the alien parasites were known collectively as "New Bloods". Individually, they were:

Anima
Debuted in The New Titans Annual #9.
Argus
Debuted in The Flash (vol. 2) Annual #6.
Ballistic
Debuted in Batman Annual #17.
Cardinal Sin
Debuted in Batman: Legends of the Dark Knight Annual #3.
Chimera
Debuted in Team Titans Annual #1.
Edge
Debuted in Superman: The Man of Steel Annual #2.
Geist
Debuted in Detective Comics Annual #6.
Gunfire
Debuted in Deathstroke Annual #2.
Hitman
Debuted in Demon Annual #2.
Hook
Debuted in Green Arrow (vol. 2) Annual #6
Jamm
Debuted in Legion of Super-Heroes (vol. 4) Annual #4.
Joe Public
Debuted in Batman: Shadow of the Bat Annual #1.
Krag
Debuted in Justice League America Annual #7.
Layla
Debuted in Lobo (vol. 2) Annual #1.
Lionheart
Debuted in Justice League International Annual #4.
Loose Cannon
Debuted in Action Comics Annual #5.
Loria
Debuted in Showcase '94 #12.
Mongrel
Debuted in Hawkman (vol. 3) Annual #1.
Myriad
Debuted in Superman (vol. 2) Annual #5.
Nightblade
Debuted in Green Lantern (vol. 3) Annual #2.
Pax
Debuted in L.E.G.I.O.N. Annual #4.
Prism
Debuted in Eclipso Annual #1.
Razorsharp
Debuted in Robin (vol. 2) Annual #2.
Shadowstryke
Debuted in Justice League America Annual #7.
Slingshot
Debuted in Justice League America Annual #7.
Sparx
Member of the Force family, debuted in The Adventures of Superman Annual #5.
Terrorsmith
Debuted in Justice League America Annual #7.

Another New Blood, Freight Train, was introduced in Outsiders vol. 4 #30. He is a Black Canadian mercenary with the ability to absorb kinetic energy, giving himself enhanced strength, durability, and speed.

== Blood Pack ==
Blood Pack #1, artist Christopher Taylor.

With corporate backing, and under the leadership of Jade, some of the New Bloods formed a superhero team known as the Blood Pack. The series was created by Charles Moore and Christopher Taylor. Blood Pack was a four issue limited series.

=== Blood Pack Members ===
- Jade - Jennie-Lynn Hayden is a living power ring, and the daughter of Green Lantern Alan Scott. She is team leader.
- Ballistic
- Nightblade
- Loria
- Geist
- Mongrel
- Sparx
- Razorsharp

Loria would die in the final issue of the series. Most of the team's members - Ballistic, Geist, Mongrel, Nightblade, and Razorsharp - were killed by Superboy-Prime in Infinite Crisis (2005). During Blackest Night (2009), the five are reanimated as members of the Black Lantern Corps and battle Superboy-Prime. He destroys them by using a Black Lantern power ring to cycle through the emotional spectrum, creating a burst of colored energy. Geist and Nightblade appear during Final Crisis amongst a large group of "forgotten" characters encountering Superman in Limbo.

A new Blood Pack was introduced in Faces of Evil: Prometheus, made up of other surviving Bloodlines heroes. Led by Argus, the team included Gunfire, Anima, and Hook. Hook was killed by an impostor Prometheus. Gunfire's hands were amputated and Anima was killed in an ensuing encounter with the real Prometheus.

== Chapter order ==
Bloodlines was divided into four "chapters": Outbreak, Earthplague, Deathstorm, and Bloodbath. The order of the storyline is as follows:

=== Bloodlines: Outbreak ===
- Lobo (vol. 2) Annual #1
- Superman: The Man of Steel Annual #2
- Batman: Shadow of The Bat Annual #1
- The Flash (vol. 2) Annual #6
- The New Titans Annual #9
- Superman (vol. 2) Annual #5
- Green Lantern (vol. 3) Annual #2
- Batman Annual #17
- Justice League International Annual #4

=== Bloodlines: Earthplague ===
- Robin (vol. 2) Annual #2
- Action Comics Annual #5
- Legion of Super-Heroes (vol. 4) Annual #4
- Green Arrow (vol. 2) Annual #6
- Detective Comics Annual #6
- Justice League America Annual #7
- The Adventures of Superman Annual #5
- Hawkman (vol. 3) Annual #1

=== Bloodlines: Deathstorm ===
- Deathstroke, the Terminator Annual #2
- Eclipso Annual #1
- Demon Annual #2
- Batman: Legends of The Dark Knight Annual #3
- Team Titans Annual #1
- L.E.G.I.O.N. '93 Annual #4

=== Bloodlines: Bloodbath ===
- Bloodbath #1
- Bloodbath #2

== The New 52 ==
As part of The New 52 (a reboot of DC's continuity), the Bloodlines crossover was revamped and integrated as a six-issue miniseries.
