= Ballistic (DC Comics) =

- Ballistic as depicted in Blood Pack #1 (March 1995). Art by Christopher Taylor (penciler) and Andy Lanning (inker).

Publication information
- Publisher: DC Comics
- First appearance: Batman Annual #17 (1993)
- Created by: Doug Moench (writer); Michael Manley (artist)

In-story information
- Alter ego: Kelvin Mao
- Species: Metahuman
- Team affiliations: Blood Pack; Gotham City Police Department; Black Lantern Corps
- Abilities: Superhuman strength, durability, hearing, and vision; Expert marksman

Ballistic (Kelvin Mao) is a superhero published by DC Comics. He first appeared in Batman Annual #17 (1993), part of the Bloodlines event, and was created by Doug Moench and Michael Manley.

== Fictional character biography ==
Kelvin Mao is a Korean-American member of the Gotham City Police Department Tactical Unit who is sent to face Angon, a murderous alien parasite. The entire squad is killed except Mao, who is bitten by Angon. Mao is among the few victims of the alien who survive; his metagene is activated and he gains superhuman strength, durability, hearing, and night vision. Shortly afterward, Mao assumes the codename Ballistic and joins with several other "New Bloods" to defeat Angon and other members of his species who are attacking Earth. After defeating the aliens, Ballistic becomes an independent vigilante.

During the Infinite Crisis event, Ballistic is one of many heroes who defend Metropolis from the Secret Society of Super Villains. Ballistic teams with several former members of the Blood Pack to battle Solomon Grundy, only for him, Grundy, and the Blood Pack to be killed by Superboy-Prime.

During the Blackest Night event, the Blood Pack members killed by Superboy-Prime are resurrected as members of the Black Lantern Corps. Prime obtains a Black Lantern ring, which channels his emotions and generates a burst of colored energy that destroys the Black Lanterns.

== Powers and abilities ==
Ballistic is a metahuman who possesses superhuman strength, durability, hearing, and vision. He is additionally a skilled tactician, marksman, and combatant.
