= Tricky Dicky (Cor!!) =

British comic strip by Cyril Gwyn Price

Tricky Dicky was a British comic strip which originally ran in the British comics magazine Cor!!. It debuted in 1970, drawn by Cyril Gwyn Price (1905–1970). It ran until 29 September 1973. After Price's death other comic strip artists continued the series.

== Concept ==
Similar to Roger the Dodger in The Beano, the strip was about a boy of the same name (Dicky), who would 'trick' his way out of things like washing the car or carrying heavy cases. His motto was, "I can get out of anything".

Unlike Roger, however, his schemes would usually backfire on him. Dicky was a blond boy with a large quiff, who was a teenage boy during his first appearances, but gradually was remodelled into a younger boy as the series went on.

== Similarities with other comics ==
There is another British comic strip called Tricky Dicky. It also features a young British boy who enjoys playing tricks on others that backfire on him, but it is a completely different character. This particular boy has black spiky hair.
