= Teacher's Pet (comics) =

British comic strip

Teacher's Pet was a British strip appearing in the 1970s comic book Cor!!. The strip began in the first issue in June 1970, and usually appeared on colour on the back page. Norman Mansbridge drew it throughout.

== Plot ==
Most strips follow a simple formula. The irritatingly bossy pupil Patsy, always depicted in a red dress with a huge red bow in her hair, goes to extreme lengths to please her female (unnamed) Teacher, which annoys the other pupils no end. But Patsy's schemes always backfire, either causing Teacher to punish her or resulting in a humiliating accident for Patsy, much to the other pupils' delight.

None of Patsy's classmates is ever named, but they usually include another girl and two boys of different heights.
