= Chalky (comics) =

British comic book character

- Title panel of the Chalky strip in Cor!!

Publication information
- Publisher: IPC
- First appearance: 24 July 1971
- First comic appearance: Cor!!
- Created by: Terry Bave

In-story information
- Abilities: Graffiti

Chalky was a British comic book character from Cor!!, and from 22 June 1974 when the publications were merged, Buster, both published by IPC. Chalky was created and first drawn by Terry Bave in the 24 July 1971 issue of Cor!!. He was more regularly drawn by Dick Millington and Gordon Hill.

A talented and super fast artist, Chalky would use his chalks on all surfaces, including walls, fences, pavements, planks, and even glass. In the early issues, he is a very good character, but by the 1990s his character has become more mischievous. Many issues featured his mum and dad.

In 1981 Chalky was voted by the readers to be more popular than Buster and featured on the front cover for 20 June 1981 issue.

The last few years of Buster were reprint material only, with Chalky's longevity continuing until Buster's end at the beginning of 2000 The very last page of the final Buster featured Chalky being arrested for vandalism, acknowledging his wrongdoing, and asking for 92,487 further cases to be taken into consideration.

== Back story ==
Chalky is the son of another well-known Chalky, Chalky (or Chalkie) White. Chalky senior is a friend of Andy Capp, the eponymous layabout character from the cartoon strip featured in the Daily Mirror.
