= World Distributors =

British comic book publisher

- Type: Publisher, Distributor
- Industry: Periodicals, Books
- Founded: 1945; 81 years ago
- Founder: Alfred, John, and Sydney Pemberton
- Fate: Acquired by Egmont Group (1999)
- Successor: Egmont Children's Books (Egmont Books Limited)
- Headquarters: Manchester, United Kingdom
- Key people: Nick Pemberton
- Products: Comics, Annuals, Paperback books
- Divisions: Thrilling Love; Illustrated World Library; World Adventure Library

World Distributors (known colloquially as "Pembertons") was a British publisher and distributor of magazines and comic books. The company was known for repackaging American comics and producing comic book annuals based on licensed properties. For a period, the company was the lone distributor of American comics in the UK. Pembertons was owned and operated by the brothers Alfred, John, and Sydney Pemberton, originally based in Manchester.

== History ==
The Pemberton brothers started out as second-hand booksellers in Manchester. Around 1940, they began a book distribution business, T. A. & E. Pemberton.

=== 1945–1952: Paperback books ===
In 1945, shortly after World War II, they became a publisher of lurid and sensationalist paperback books; one series was known as "Thrilling Love." At this point the brothers created the company name World Distributors/Sydney Pemberton (the company was incorporated as World Distributors (Manchester) Limited on 2 May 1949).

The paperback craze died down in the period 1951–1952, partly as the result of Home Office clampdowns on "obscene and objectionable publications;" by the end of 1952, the Pembertons had mostly left the paperback publication business (though the company continued publishing books sporadically in the following decades).

=== 1947–1959: Reprint comics ===
From 1947 to 1959, World Distributors published black-and-white ongoing comic book titles. These were mostly reprints of American Western titles, many from the Dell Comics backlist.

The company's first foray into comics, however, was 1947's Super Thriller Comic, an anthology comic of original stories by British creators (featuring "Ace Hart the Atom Man"), which was picked up with Superthriller issue #11 from the Edinburgh-based printer/publisher Foldes. Super Thriller Comic ran for 22 issues until issue #33 (1950) when it became the cowboy comic Western Super Thriller Comics, running an additional 49 issues to #82 before it was canceled. As Western Super Thriller Comics, it featured the Rawhide Kid (not the same Rawhide Kid published by Marvel).

World Distributors' longest-running Western reprint titles included Roy Rogers Comics (100 issues and 12 annuals, 1951–1963), John Wayne Adventure Comics (82 issues and six annuals, 1950–1960), The Lone Ranger (66 issues and 12 annuals, 1953–1976), and Red Ryder Comics (62 issues, 1954–1959).

The few non-Western-themed comics titles which had extended runs during the 1950s were A Movie Classic (88 issues, 1956–1959), which featured adaptations of popular movies; and Walt Disney Series (52 issues, 1956–c. 1959), reprints from the Dell Comics title Walt Disney's Comics and Stories.

As Western comics faded in popularity, World Distributors had canceled most of their ongoing titles by 1959.

=== 1950s–1980s: Annuals ===
World Distributors may be best known for the hardback annuals they published based on popular film, television, animation, and comics properties. The annuals generally contained comics (often reprints from American titles) mixed with illustrated text stories, word games, and puzzles. Beginning in 1951 and continuing into the mid-1980s, the annuals were published in the autumn of each year for the holiday gift-giving season, displaying next year's date (if any date at all) on the cover to prolong shelf-life. World Distributors shipped unsold copies to overseas markets such as New Zealand and Australia, where they still had the current year's date despite the time taken for transport.

World Distributors' longest-running annuals included Bugs Bunny (21 issues, 1951–1981), Doctor Who (20 issues, 1965–1985), Yogi Bear (17 issues, 1961–1980), Tom and Jerry (14 issues, 1967–1985), The Lone Ranger (13 issues, 1956–1976), and Star Trek (13 issues, 1969–1985). Other notable annuals published featured The Adventures of Champion, Gobots, Thunderbirds, Top Cat, The Man from U.N.C.L.E., Voyage to the Bottom of the Sea, Gary Glitter, and UK television properties like Basil Brush, Dad's Army, Just William, Blake's 7, TV Tornado, Terry Nation's Dalek, and Thomas the Tank Engine.

=== 1960s: Illustrated World Library, World Adventure Library, and Famepress titles ===
In 1965, the Pembertons returned to publishing ongoing comics series with the "Illustrated World Library" line, which featured romance, horror-suspense, western, and war comics. The line started with Illustrated Romance Library and Thriller; and increased in 1970 with three more ongoing titles: Picture Romance, Sundance Western, and War Hero. A number of the "Illustrated World Library" titles lasted into the late 1970s.

To augment the "Illustrated World Library" line, in 1966 the Pembertons launched the "World Adventure Library" line of titles, featuring action heroes like Batman, Superman, Flash Gordon, Mandrake the Magician, the Phantom, and Tarzan; as well as comic book versions of Bonanza and The Man from U.N.C.L.E. The "World Adventure Library" line, however, had petered out by the end of 1967.

Also in 1966 World Distributors acquired a number of ongoing titles from Famepress, a UK publisher which began operating in 1960. Long-running titles picked up from Famepress included the Western title Pecos Bill Picture Library, the romance comic Young Lovers, the adventure comic Top Three Adventure Picture Library, and the war comic Battleground. World Distributors gave up on the Famepress titles after about two years, however; many of them were in turn acquired by Alex White in 1967/1968. (Alex White appears to have gone defunct shortly thereafter.)

=== 1970s: American comics distributor ===
The company was for a time in the 1970s, the official distributor of American comics in the UK, an arrangement which ended in the early 1980s.

=== 1980: World International ===
In 1980, the company became known as World International Publishing, Ltd., but due to falling sales limiting their publishing activities. In 1991 they moved to new offices in Handforth, Cheshire, still operating as World International and publishing annuals in much lesser volume. The company went defunct in 1993; the Pemberton brothers were no longer affiliated with the company by this point.

In mid-1995, the business was revived as World International Limited and moved offices to London.

=== 1999: Sale to Egmont ===
The Egmont Group acquired World International in early 1999, and it became known as Egmont World Limited, eventually becoming Egmont Children's Books (Egmont Books Limited). Egmont had previously purchased the Fleetway arm of IPC Media and merged it with their existing comics publishing division, thus becoming Britain's largest comic book publisher. By 1999–2000 the resultant company was focusing on reprint and licensed material titles such as World produced. Annuals continued to be published, but by 2001 any mention of the old World name was removed from the company logos.

== Titles published (selected) ==
=== Ongoing titles ===
- Billy the Kid Adventure Magazine (76 issues, 1953–1959) – reprints from the Toby Press title of the same name
- Black Diamond Western (31 issues, 1949–c. — reprints Lev Gleason Publications title of the same name
- Cisco Kid (51 issues, 1952-1955) — reprints of the Dell Comics title of the same name
- Gene Autry and Champion (34 issues, 1956–1958) — reprints of the Dell title of the same name
- Indian Chief (featuring White Eagle) (31 issues, 1953–1954) — reprints of the Dell title of the same name
- John Wayne Adventure Comics (82 issues, 1950–c. 1957) — reprints from the Toby Press title of the same name
- The Lone Ranger (66 issues, 1953–1958) — reprints from the Dell title of the same name
- A Movie Classic (88 issues, 1956–1959) — adaptations of popular movies
- Red Ryder Comics (62 issues, 1954–1959) — reprints from the Dell title of the same name
- Roy Rogers Comics (100 issues, 1951–1959) — reprinting the Dell Comic of the same name
- Super Thriller Comic (22 issues, 1947–1950) — numbering continues from Superthriller (Foldes); numbering continues with Western Super Thriller Comics
- Tom Corbett, Space Cadet (11 issues, 1953–1954) — reprints from the Dell Comics title
- Tonto (32 issues, 1953-1955) — reprinting the Dell Comics of the same name
- Walt Disney Series (52 issues, 1956–c. 1959) — reprints from the Dell Comics series
- Western Classic (39 issues, 1950–c. 1952)
- Western Roundup Comic (42 issues, c. 1955-1958) — reprints from the Dell title of the same name
- Western Super Thriller Comics (49 issues, 1950-c. 1954) — continuing the numbering from Super Thriller Comic
- Zane Grey's Stories of the West (31 issues, 1953-1954)

=== Illustrated World Library series ===
- Illustrated Romance Library (23 issues, c. 1965–c. 1970)
- Picture Romance (198 issues, 1970–1975)
- Sundance Western (117 issues, 1970–1979)
- Thriller (86 issues, 1965–c. 1977)
- War Hero (84 issues, 1970–c. 1977)

=== World Adventure Library ===
- Batman World Adventure Library (11 issues, 1966–c. 1967)
- Bonanza World Adventure Library (3 issues, 1967)
- Flash Gordon World Adventure Library (8 issues, 1967)
- Man from U.N.C.L.E. World Adventure Library (14 issues–c. 1967)
- Mandrake the Magician World Adventure (8 issues, 1967) — reprints from the newspaper strip by Lee Falk
- Phantom World Adventure Library (8 issues, 1967)
- Superman World Adventure Library (4 issues, 1967)
- Tarzan World Adventure Library (4 issues, 1967) — reprints from Dell/Gold Key series

=== Acquired from Famepress ===
Many of the titles acquired from Famepress in 1966 were then taken over by Alex White in 1967/1968; some were canceled.

- Attack! (14 issues, 1966–1967) — acquired with issue #37; continued by Alex White
- Battleground (39 issues, 1966–1967) — acquired with issue #93; series continued by Alex White
- Pecos Bill Picture Library (26 issues, 1966–1967) — acquired with issue #125
- Scotland Yard (20 issues, 1966–1967) — acquired with issue #5
- Top Three Adventure Picture Library (24 issues, 1966–1967) — acquired with issue #110
- Totem (26 issues, 1966–1967) — acquired (as Totem Picture Library) with issue #77; series continued by Alex White
- Undercover (38 issues, 1967-1968) — acquired with issue #45; series continued by Alex White
- Young Lovers (31 issues, 1966-1967) — acquired with issue # 124; series continued by Alex White

=== Annuals ===
- Basil Brush Annual (10 issues, 1971–1980)
- Bugs Bunny Annual (21 issues, 1951–1983) — reprints from the Dell Comics Bugs Bunny series
- The Dr Who Annual (20 issues, 1965–1985) — contributors included Paul Crompton, Paul Green, and John Fasnacht
- The Lone Ranger Annual (13 issues, 1956–1976) — reprints from the Dell Comics series
- Marvel Comics superheroes — reprints from various Marvel Comics superhero titles:
  - The Fantastic Four Comic Album (2 issues, 1969–1970)
  - The Fantastic Four Comic Annual (2 issues, 1969–1970)
  - Marvel Annual (2 issues, 1974–1975)
  - Marvel Comic Album (1 issue, 1975)
  - Marvel Comic Annual (3 issues, 1969–1971)
  - Marvel Story Book Annual (1 issue, 1967)
- The Pink Panther Annual (10 issues, 1973–1986) — reprints from the Gold Key Comics series
- Star Trek Annual (13 issues, 1969–1985) — reprints from the Gold Key series
- Tom and Jerry Annual (14 issues, 1967–1985) — reprints from the Dell Comics series
- TV Tornado (5 annuals, 1967–1971) — contributions from Denis Gifford and Mick Anglo
- Wild West Comic Annual (10 issues, 1951–1960) — reprints from a variety of Western comics, including many from Dell's Four Color
- Yogi Bear Annual (17 issues, 1961–1980) — reprints from the Gold Key series
- Thomas the Tank Engine Annual (2 issues, 1979–1980)

=== Book series ===
==== Little Owl Books ====
Title	Year	ISBN
123		
ABC		
A Day at the Zoo		
Animal Tales		
Baby's First Book		
Book of Prayers		
Cinderella	1984	0-7235-4959-1
My Favourite Things		
Funny Feet		
Heidi		
I Can Count		
I Can Tell the Time		
Let's Pretend		
My Book of Pets		
My Book of Words		
Nursery Rhymes		
Sleeping Beauty		
Snow White and the Seven Dwarfs		
So Big, So Small, So Long, So Tall		
Tat the Cat - A Winter's Tale		
Tat the Cat - All's Well That Ends Well		
Tat the Cat - In Danger		
Tat the Cat - Orchard Cottage		
The Brave Tin Soldier		
The Elves and the Shoemaker		
The Gingerbread Man		
The Little Match Girl		
The Pied Piper		
The Ugly Duckling		
Things That Go		
Thumbelina		
Tom Thumb		

==== Little Owl Superstars ====
===== Gordon T. Gopher =====
Title	Year	ISBN
A Friend in Need	1987	
Another Fine Mess	1987	0-7235-1197-7
A Borrower at Large	1987	
Looking for Cousin Pablo	1987	0-7235-1199-3

==== Mini World ====
===== BraveStarr =====
Title	Year	ISBN
The Moonstone Crisis	1987	
Water Fever	1987	
The Gunslinger	1987	0-7235-8984-4
Cave of Skulls	1987	0-7235-8983-6

===== The Centurions =====
Title	Year	ISBN
Mechanical Mayhem!	1987	
Divide and Conquer!	1987	0-7235-8843-0
Fire from the Skies!	1987	
Island of Evil!	1987	

===== Fireman Sam =====
Title	Year	ISBN
Sam's Bumper Jumper	1987	0-7235-7306-9
Sam's Rabbit Rescue	1987	0-7235-7305-0
Sam's Night Watch	1987	
Sam Smells a Rat	1987	

===== The Glo Friends =====
Title	Year	ISBN
Glo Snail's Sleepy Ride	1986	
Glo Butterfly's Dream Day	1986	
Glo Worm's Enchanted Potato	1986	
Glo Snugbug's Secret	1986	0-7235-7896-6

===== Rainbow =====
Title	Year	ISBN
A Visit from the Doctor and A Bus Ride	1986	0-7235-7638-9

===== Scooby-Doo =====
Title	Year	ISBN
On Parade	1986	0-7235-7555-9

===== She-Ra, Princess of Power =====
Title	Year	ISBN
Threat to Crystal Castle!	1986	
The Red Stone of Darkmor	1986	
Catra's Prize Catch	1986	0-7235-7885-0
Princess Adora Imprisoned!	1986	

== See also ==
- Brown Watson
