= Section 8 (comics) =

Comic book superhero team

- Panel from Hitman #18. From left to right: Defenestrator, Friendly Fire, Sixpack, Shakes, Jean de Baton-Baton, Dogwelder, Bueno Excellente, Flemgem; art by John McCrea.

Publication information
- Publisher: DC Comics
- First appearance: Hitman #18 (September 1997)
- Created by: Garth Ennis; John McCrea; Steve Dillon (Dogwelder only)

In-story information
- Base(s): Gotham City
- Member(s): Sixpack; Bueno Excellente; The Defenestrator; Dogwelder; Friendly Fire; Jean de Baton-Baton; Flemgem; Shakes

Section 8 is a fictional comic book team of superheroes appearing in books published by DC Comics. Created by writer Garth Ennis and artists John McCrea and Steve Dillon (for the character Dogwelder only), the team first appeared in Hitman #18 (September 1997). The team is named after the United States military designation for "mentally unfit for duty".

== History ==
The team is based in The Cauldron, the Irish section of Gotham City, and is led by Sixpack. They apparently have some sort of heroic history (though this is questionable, as several of their members seem prone to complicated hallucinations) prior to the events of Hitman. The team is headquartered on an artificial island in a sewer, however they are shown to have relocated to Noonan’s Bar as of the events in Sixpack and Dogwelder: Hard-Travellin' Heroz. As of the start of the series, the team is split up, although they are all still located within Gotham City. Friendly Fire, Shakes, and Jean de Baton-Baton had retired; the Defenestrator was in Arkham Asylum after throwing a cop through the same window fourteen times; Dogwelder and Flemgem were still stalking the streets of Gotham; Sixpack was a regular at Noonan's, believing his drunken dreams of superhero work were real.

The team reforms to provide critical support for Tommy Monaghan and his crew during the "Ace of Killers" storyline. Collectively, they kill many mafia soldiers that were trying to kill Tommy, Natt the Hat, Detective Tiegel and Catwoman. The group later aids Tommy during his encounter with Lobo. Specifically, they aid Tommy in creating material blackmailing a stunned Lobo with the help of Bueno Excellente which prevents Lobo from taking revenge against any of them. Sixpack makes several solo appearances in Hitman as comic relief and an ally in some battles.

In their next appearance, the team was starting to split up again after Friendly Fire pointed out how pathetic they were and that all they did was meet once a month and achieve nothing. Sixpack is left distraught when Friendly Fire points out, in anger, that all his 'superhero' missions are just drunken dreams. However, when the demonic Multi-Angled Ones arose in Gotham, Section 8 rallied to fight them. Their attempt was completely unsuccessful: most of the team die or accidentally kill themselves. The Many-Angled Ones become interested in Sixpack when the flames from an explosion don't touch him, and when he tells them that he would be willing to die standing against them because "that's what superheroes do". The demons are left amused and a deal is made where Sixpack will leave with them and try to battle against them for his own soul, in exchange for leaving Earth alone.

Sixpack has a statue built in a park in his honor of his sacrifice, though he is shown still alive in New York City at an Alcoholics Anonymous meeting, implying that his "battle for his soul" is facing his addiction to alcohol. Bueno Excellente survived the battle as well and avenges their loss on the scientist responsible for releasing the Many Angled Ones.

In June 2015, DC began publishing "All-Star Section Eight", by Ennis and McCrea.

When Sixpack has a near-death experience, the Phantom Stranger reveals that the dead members of Section Eight were sent to Limbo, with the exception of Dogwelder, who was condemned to Hell.

Later, in 2016, a limited series was run, titled Sixpack and Dogwelder: Hard-Travellin' Heroz, starring Section Eight in a mission to save the world. It included other DC characters such as the Spectre, John Constantine, and introduced new members to Section Eight: Baytor and Guts. On top of this, it featured the newly-replaced Dogwelder who, as shown in All-Star Section Eight, is the predecessor to the Dogwelder once on the team. The team saves the world with the help of John Constantine, travelling to Sirius, the Dog Star, in order to weld it with its dwarf to stop a world-ending collision. Dogwelder is sacrificed during this process.

== Members ==
- Sixpack: The team's leader, whose special ability is grotesque drunkenness and beating villains with broken-off liquor bottles.
- Bueno Excellente: An obese, sweaty, and bald Latino in an overcoat who "defeats evil with the power of perversion". Generally, the only things he says are "Bueno" or "Excellente", often preceded by a creepy chuckle. That Stupid Bastich reveals that he has a career in porn films.
- The Defenestrator: A large, burly man who obsessively carries around a window, through which he forcefully throws criminals and the occasional unlucky policeman. He is a parody of the Terminator.
- Dogwelder: A silent masked man who welds dead dogs to evildoers.
- Friendly Fire: A large, hapless man in a red cowl who can generate potent energy blasts from his hands. He is the most defeatist member of the team and the only one who will state how pathetic the team is (though he apologises to Sixpack for revealing the truth), but he still wore his costume even in retirement.
- Jean de Baton-Baton: A bizarrely gaunt walking French caricature who defeats enemies with "the power of Frenchness", as expressed by savage beatings with a baguette and occasionally blinding others with garlic and onions.
- Flemgem: A sickly, thin, bald man in a green suit and a purple domino mask who can produce large amounts of phlegm.
- Shakes: A thin, hairy vagrant who upsets people through stutters and an overall shaking palsy. He is a frequent accidental target of Friendly Fire. He dies trying to take out the Many-Angled Ones, when he grabs a grenade and runs to a petrol station.

Following Sixpack's accidental return to alcoholism, he assembles a new Section 8 to combat a mysterious (and possibly imaginary) threat. Sixpack convinces Bueno Excellente to reenlist, brings in five new members, and attempts to fill the vacant eighth position with someone from the Justice League.

- Guts: A sentient entanglement of disembodied internal organs who vaguely takes the form of a human, Guts shows no apparent super-human abilities other than her abstract form.
- Baytor: A demon who works as a barman and caretaker at Noonan's and is a friend of Etrigan. Also the demon lord of the criminally insane.
- Dogwelder: Successor to the original Dogwelder of Section 8, Dogwelder is an African-American man who obtained Dogwelder's tools from a pawn shop. The tools became stuck to him and transformed him into the next Dogwelder, giving him the compulsion to weld dogs to the faces of enemies. He is the first Dogwelder to harness the power of his ancestors and use the dogs for more than just welding, welding together Sirius A and Sirius B to save the universe.
- The Grapplah!: A man with grappling hooks and guns who is also "an annoying tool who won't shut his stupid mouth".
- Powertool: A rational, construction-themed vigilante with a drill in his helmet's faceplate.

== In other media ==
- James Gunn stated that he considered to have Dogwelder in The Suicide Squad but did not feel the character should be expressed cinematically. During production of the film, fans petitioned to have Dogwelder in it, with McCrea giving his support for it.
- Sixpack appears in Kite Man: Hell Yeah!, voiced by Eddie Pepitone.
