= Wragge =

Wragge is a surname, and may refer to:

- Betty Wragge (born 1918), American actress
- Chris Wragge (born 1970), American news anchor
- Clement Lindley Wragge (1852–1922), English meteorologist
- Edmund Wragge (1837–1929), British railway engineer
- Ethan Wragge (born 1990), American basketball player
- Frank Wragge (born 1898), English footballer
- Sydney Wragge (1908–1978), American fashion designer (his B. H. Wragge label existed till 1971), first president of CFDA.
- Tony Wragge (born 1979), American football offensive lineman

== See also ==
- Wragg
- Wragge & Co
