= Prometheus (DC Comics) =

DC Comics supervillain

- Prometheus as depicted in New Year's Evil: Prometheus vol. 1 (February 1998). Art by Arnie Jorgensen.

Publication information
- Publisher: DC Comics
- First appearance: (Curt Calhoun); Blue Beetle (vol. 6) #3 (August 1986) (Unnamed version); New Year's Evil: Prometheus #1 (February 1998) (Chad Graham); Batman: Gotham Knights #52 (June 2004)
- Created by: (Curt Calhoun); Len Wein (writer); Paris Cullins (artist) (Unnamed version); Grant Morrison (writer); Arnie Jorgensen (artist) (Chad Graham); A. J. Lieberman

In-story information
- Alter ego: Curt Calhoun; Chad Graham
- Species: Human
- Team affiliations: (Curt Calhoun); Hybrid (Unnamed version); The Society; Injustice Gang (Chad Graham); The Society
- Notable aliases: (Unnamed version); Retro, Shazam, Matt Dell
- Abilities: Peak human physical and mental conditioning Highly skilled hand-to-hand combatant and martial artist Expert in the use of various weapons Cybernetic implants, helmet and armor further augment physical attributes

Prometheus is a name used by multiple supervillains appearing in American comic books published by DC Comics. Created by writer Grant Morrison and penciller Arnie Jorgensen, the most recognized version first appeared in New Year's Evil: Prometheus (February 1998). Commonly an adversary of the Justice League and a villainous foil personality to Batman (similar to villains Killer Moth, Wrath, and Hush), Prometheus would serve as an enemy to superheroes including Batman, Green Arrow and Midnighter.

In 2009, Prometheus was ranked as IGN's 80th Greatest Comic Book Villain of All Time. On The CW's live-action Arrowverse TV series Arrow, the character was portrayed by Josh Segarra and voiced by Michael Dorn.

== Publication history ==
Curt Calhoun debuted in Blue Beetle (vol. 6) #3 (August 1986). A new version of Prometheus debuted in New Year's Evil: Prometheus (February 1998) and returned in JLA #16–17 (March–April 1998) and #36–41 (December 1999–May 2000). The character was then impersonated for a time by Chad Graham, but returned in Faces of Evil: Prometheus #1 (March 2009). Prometheus starred as the villain in the limited series Justice League: Cry for Justice #1–7 (September 2009–April 2010), and was killed at the conclusion of the story.

Writer Mike Conroy noted "...with his technologically advanced armor and weapons arsenal, which can download the fighting techniques of the world's top martial artists...he (Prometheus) turned out to be a formidable foe, as the JLA found out".

== Fictional character biography ==
=== Curt Calhoun ===
The original version, Curt Calhoun, debuted in Blue Beetle (vol. 6) #3 (August 1986), followed by appearances in issues #4 (September 1986); #6 (November 1986); #8–9 (January–February 1987) and #11–13 (April–June 1987). Calhoun is a small-time criminal working for supervillain Doctor Alchemy and is hired to steal a quantity of the metal promethium from KORD Inc., an organization owned by Ted Kord. Although successful, both Calhoun and Dr. Alchemy are captured by Blue Beetle. On release from prison, Calhoun aids the Blue Beetle against Calculator and is offered a position as a foreman at KORD Inc. by Kord. While saving Kord from an industrial accident, Calhoun is covered with metal laced with promethium. En route to the hospital, Calhoun's ambulance is attacked by members of the supervillain team Hybrid. The leader, Mento, transforms the metal covering Calhoun into a metallic shell that he can heat up at will. Assuming the "Prometheus" alias, the reluctant Calhoun fights alongside Hybrid in an unsuccessful attempt to defeat the New Teen Titans. Although Mento eventually directs Hybrid against the Titans once again, they rebel and Mento is apparently cured of his insanity by Titan member Raven.

=== Unnamed version ===
The most well-known version is the unnamed son of two hippie spree killers, who traveled across the United States with them until they were gunned down by police in a shootout. This traumatic experience causes their son's hair to turn white, and he vows to "annihilate the forces of justice" to avenge his parents.

Using his parents' hidden caches of money, the son travels the world and develops his skills, becoming an underground pit-fighter in Brazil and a mercenary in Africa, and joining terrorist groups in the Middle East. After avenging his parents' deaths by murdering the police officer who shot them, he locates the Himalayan city of Shambhala, inhabited by a sect of monks that worshiped the concept of evil. Prometheus discovers the monastery has been built on an alien spaceship, and the leader of the sect is one of the creatures from the vessel. He kills the alien and obtains a key that which opens a portal to the Ghost Zone.

Prometheus builds a house in the void as his headquarters, which is warped by the dimensional effects to become "crooked". He relates his origin to a young man, with the alias "Retro", who has won a competition to be part of the JLA for a day. Prometheus kills Retro, copies the young man's mannerisms (courtesy of his advanced helmet), and joins the tour group at the JLA transporters, intending to masquerade as Retro to gain access to the JLA Watchtower.

Initially, the plan appears to be successful, with Prometheus ambushing the Justice League. Prometheus is caught off guard by Catwoman (who is disguised as Cat Grant), allowing the heroes time to recover. Prometheus switches places with Zauriel in the Ghost Zone and escapes capture.

Prometheus returns as a member of Lex Luthor's second Injustice Gang. During the confusion caused by the arrival of the weapon Mageddon, Prometheus uses a White Martian space vessel abandoned in the Ghost Zone to infiltrate the Watchtower and attack Oracle. Oracle escapes, with Prometheus's helmet being damaged in the process. The villain retrieves his original helmet (lost during the first battle with the JLA) and battles Batman once again. Prometheus is neutralized when Batman sabotages his helmet, overriding the information on the disc Prometheus uses to upload his combat skills and replacing the data with the limited physical skills and coordination of Stephen Hawking. Batman prevents fellow member Huntress from killing the now-helpless Prometheus. Batman and Martian Manhunter take Prometheus into custody and use the latter's telepathy to mentally incapacitate Prometheus. After Martian Manhunter is killed by Libra, Prometheus's mind is restored and he tracks down Chad Graham, killing his would-be protégé and maiming or killing members of the Blood Pack.

==== Cry for Justice ====
Prometheus impersonates Freddy Freeman and gains access to the JLA satellite, which in turn allows Prometheus to place teleportation devices in the home cities of various heroes which will "strand" them in various places in the past and future, as revenge for the years that he spent with his mind damaged. Prometheus also maims Roy Harper after Harper realizes his foe is not Freddy Freeman. After defeating the JLA and the Teen Titans by reading files on them, Prometheus is captured by Donna Troy and beaten brutally, until being stopped by the Shade. Prometheus offers to reveal the location of the devices in exchange for his release, after they malfunction and activate. Star City suffers massive casualties, including Roy's daughter Lian Harper. Prometheus is murdered by Green Arrow, who shoots an arrow through his head.

==== The New 52 ====
In 2011, "The New 52" rebooted the DC universe. Prometheus shows up to torment Midnighter using stolen technology from the God Garden that he sells to various individuals around the world. In addition, he acquires the Gardener's secret files on Midnighter's true identity and origin. When confronted by Midnighter, Prometheus uses God Garden technology to block Midnighter's tactical computer, eliminating the edge Midnighter has in analyzing an opponent's fighting techniques. Prometheus also reveals that he has downloaded all of Midnighter's own skills into his brain to use against his enemy. Pretending to be an ordinary man, he uses the alias Matt Dell to seduce Midnighter.

=== Chad Graham ===
The third version, Chad Graham, debuted in Batman: Gotham Knights #52 (June 2004), as part of the "Pushback" storyline from issues #50–55 (April–September 2004). Graham is the protege of the second Prometheus and assumed the mantle after Prometheus was incapacitated by Martian Manhunter. Graham is then recruited to join another version of the Secret Society of Super Villains and participates in a massive attack by the Society on Metropolis. Graham is later murdered when the true Prometheus regains himself; he expresses contempt for Graham's impersonation but is satisfied that the damage Graham has done to Prometheus's reputation would lead to the heroes underestimating him in the future.

== Powers and abilities ==
Prometheus possesses no superhuman abilities, but has undergone intense physical and mental training and utilizes an extensive range of equipment and technology like the hero Batman. Common tools include body armor, gauntlets that fire various projectiles, a side-handle baton with several technological features, and a helmet that in addition to emitting strobe lighting capable of disorientation and hypnotism, can download the knowledge and physical skills of others directly into his brain via a compact disc, his default disc including the skills of thirty of the world's greatest martial artists. Where Prometheus obtains this information is not known, but his combat skills include the duplicated abilities of Batman and Lady Shiva, although it is unclear how much combat training he would possess if he had to fight without the helmet. The 'battlesuit'/helmet combination is also equipped with an artificial Intelligence that can rapidly calculate and deploy a variety of strategies and countermeasures that have allowed Prometheus at various times to incapacitate entire groups of the Justice League singlehandedly and simultaneously.

Finally, the unnamed version possesses the "Ghost Key" which allows the villain to teleport himself and other objects and persons to and from a dimension called the "Ghost Zone". It can also be used to inflict total molecular disintegration on a target, but Prometheus only employed this function once, when he eliminated the unsuspecting Retro. The helmet can be hacked by external sources, but Batman had to study the helmet for a month to learn how to hack it in that manner, and it is unclear if this would allow him to hack other versions of the helmet.

== Other versions ==
=== JLA/Avengers ===
Prometheus appears in JLA/Avengers #4 as a brainwashed minion of Krona.

=== Power Rangers/Justice League ===
In Justice League/Mighty Morphin Power Rangers, Billy Cranston temporarily wields Prometheus' armor after Lord Zedd and Brainiac steal his powers.

== In other media ==
=== Television ===
Josh Segarra as Prometheus masked (left) and unmasked as "Adrian Chase" (right) in Arrow.
- Two original incarnations of Prometheus appear in media set in the Arrowverse, with Michael Dorn providing his disguised voice.
  - The Earth-1 incarnation, Simon Morrison, appears in Arrow, portrayed by Josh Segarra. This version is a polymath as an expert in law, engineering, and various forms of armed and unarmed combat, appearing primarily in the fifth season and briefly in the sixth season. Following his father Justin Claybourne's death, he vowed revenge on and conducted research into Oliver Queen. After seeking out Talia al Ghul to train him in the League of Assassins' ways, Morrison assumes the alias of Starling City's District Attorney "Adrian Chase" before targeting Queen and the latter's allies as the "Throwing Star Killer", manipulating Artemis, and recruiting Black Siren to his cause. While Team Arrow eventually deduce his identity, Morrison kidnaps William Clayton and captures Queen's teammates to lure him to the island Lian Yu, where he has rigged explosives connected to a neural interface that will detonate should he die. In the ensuing fight with Queen, Morrison kills himself, though Queen and most of the captives survive.
  - The Earth-X incarnation, Tommy Merlyn, appears in the crossover Crisis on Earth-X, portrayed by Colin Donnell.

=== Video games ===
- Prometheus appears in the Game Boy Advance and Nintendo DS versions of Justice League Heroes.
- A biography for Prometheus appears in Batman Arkham Asylum.
- Simon Morrison / Prometheus appears as a playable character in Lego DC Super-Villains via the "DC TV Super-Villains" DLC pack.

=== Miscellaneous ===
Prometheus appears in Smallville: Lantern.
