= Richie Wraggs =

Richie Wraggs is a fictional comic strip character in the British comic Jackpot, appearing alongside his black cat, Lucky. (Note: This article relies excessively on references to primary sources. Please improve this by adding secondary or tertiary sources.)

Drawn by Mike Lacey, the strip debuted in Jackpot issue 1 (5 May 1979) and ran weekly until issue 140 (30 January 1982). Wraggs featured on the cover of many early issues; his last full cover appearance with Lucky was issue 67.

The first strip sees Richie expelled from his village school in "Little Drudgebury" for bringing smelly cheese to class. He declares, "C'mon Lucky—we'll seek our fortune in the big wide world." Storylines often involved Richie and Lucky finding ways to earn money or food. For example, in issue 137, Richie receives £10 for lending his candle to a man with a frozen lock. In issue 138, he attempts to get a theatre job but ends up on stage during a pantomime. The final Jackpot strip (issue 140) shows the pair sheltering from rain in a barn.

Readers voted Richie Wraggs among the top ten strips in several polls: fourth in issue 11, ninth in issue 19, ninth in issue 96, tenth in issue 116, fifth in issue 124, and eighth in issue 134.

Wraggs also appeared in Jackpot annuals and the 1981 and 1982 Summer Specials. The 1982 special included two new strips by Lacey, published after Jackpot's merger with Buster. In one, Lucky injures his paw on a diamond ring and Richie is rewarded for returning it. In the other, they shelter under a cafe umbrella and are given a meal abandoned by a departing coach tour.
