= Hitman (DC Comics) =

- Tommy Monaghan as the eponymous character, as he appeared on the cover of Hitman #53 (July 2000). Art by John McCrea.

Publication information
- Publisher: DC Comics
- First appearance: The Demon Annual #2
- Created by: Garth Ennis; John McCrea

In-story information
- Alter ego: Thomas "Tommy" Monaghan
- Team affiliations: Justice League; United States Marine Corps
- Abilities: Telepathy; X-ray vision Highly skilled in use of almost all types of firearms Capable hand-to-hand combatant

Hitman (Tommy Monaghan) is a character appearing in American comic books published by DC Comics. The character was created by Garth Ennis and John McCrea and first appeared in The Demon Annual #2 before receiving his own series by Ennis and McCrea that ran for 61 issues.

== Background ==
Hitman chronicles the exploits of Tommy Monaghan, an ex-Marine Gulf War veteran turned contract killer from the Cauldron, a lower-class Irish district of Gotham City. He first appears in The Demon Annual #2 (part of the "Bloodlines" crossover in the summer of 1993), when he is attacked and bitten by a Bloodlines parasite called Glonth. Instead of dying, the bite unexpectedly triggers his metagene and grants him x-ray vision and moderate telepathy. A side effect is that his corneas and irises are solid black, indistinguishable from his pupils; the sight managed to unnerve Batman when he first saw them. The inherited powers later come with limits, and Monaghan uses them selectively, both because of the difficulty of concentrating during an explosive firefight and the side effects of their extended use (which includes anything between a headache and a minor illness).

After gaining these powers, Monaghan decides to specialize in killing metahumans and supernatural threats, targets typically shunned by conventional contract killers as too dangerous or too expensive. Despite his powers, Monaghan relies most on his creativity, improvisational abilities, and impressive gunfighting skills to take down a majority of his targets. This specialty line of work gives him an edge over his competition, but also leads him to encountering a number of eclectic characters including demons, zombies, dinosaurs, gods, superheroes and supervillains, as well as more conventional, realistic characters such as CIA agents, the SAS and the Mafia.

The series is firmly entrenched in the DC Universe. Batman, the Joker, Green Lantern, Catwoman, Etrigan, and Superman all guest star at various points, and joking references are frequently made to then-current DC happenings (such as the long-haired Superman). The series also crossed over with many DC events, including Final Night, One Million, and No Man's Land. Monaghan also teamed with Lobo and has made a few appearances outside the series.

Although the character adopts the moniker "Hitman" in his first appearance, the name is never used in his own series; the rest of the time, he is referred to by his given name (although he was sometimes called "Hitman" in guest appearances).

== Characters ==
- Tommy Monaghan: Tommy Monaghan is a hitman from "The Cauldron", the Irish section of Gotham City. He received telepathy and X-ray vision after being bitten by an alien from Bloodlines, something which he generally tries to keep secret. With or without the powers, he is as good as any hitman in Gotham. He was raised in Saint Killian's orphanage by Sister Concepta, spending much of his childhood with Pat Noonan and Pat's uncle, Sean. He first saw a gun when a bully pulled one on him after a fight; he survived after he stared the bully down. Tommy intended to go to Gotham University with Pat in 1989 and the two tried to buy pot off a local thug to resell it at university – when the dealer tried to threaten Pat for more money, Tommy shot him. In order for Sean to convince the dealer's cousins not to retaliate, Tommy had to leave Gotham and he joined the United States Marine Corps. There he met and befriended Natt (and killed his second victims, two Marines trying to assault Natt). They went to the Gulf War together, and inadvertently killed some British SAS soldiers one night in a "friendly fire" incident they never reported. After the war, he returned to Gotham and became a professional hitman. He always wears sunglasses to hide his all-black eyes – another side effect of Bloodlines. He is unable to cry with these eyes.
- Natt the Hat: Natt "the Hat" Walls is Tommy's partner. Growing up in Detroit, he joined the Marines to get away from the gangs. There he met and befriended Tommy. They went to the Gulf War together, and inadvertently killed some British SAS soldiers one night in a "friendly fire" incident they never reported. After the war, he tried to return to his gang, but a policeman saved his life and the gang suspected treachery. Natt fled, settling into Gotham with Tommy. Natt promised his dying mother that he would no longer curse, as "the air used to turn blue around" him. He starts swearing again around issue #23, due to the current situation. The series uses the term "mothaloving" in place of more realistic swearing.
- Sean Noonan: Sean Noonan is Tommy's father figure. Sean raised his nephew Pat, Tommy's best friend since youth. Sean was at one time a hitman of some reputation in the city. When he was seven, Sean fled an abusive father and accidentally got stuck on HMS Jervis Bay; inspired by the courage and sacrifice of the British sailors, he went back to save his mother. Years later, he joined the Marines and fought in Korea, where he saw every man in his platoon die. He came to Gotham, got a job tending bar, and eventually won the bar in a poker game. "Noonan's Sleazy Bar" became the resident hang out for local hitmen: "Sleazy Bar" was originally graffiti put up by Pat and Tommy in 1979, which Sean intended to paint over for ten years before giving up. Around that time, he saved a young police officer named Connolly from two robbers. In such ways, he collected many favors over the years. He wanted "The Old Dog" put on his tombstone; after his death in 2000, Tommy instead put "Beloved Father".
- Ringo Chen: is the other best hitman in town and even more cold-blooded than Tommy (though nobody is sure who is deadlier). There is always tension between the two, as everybody expects they will square off one day. Despite this, he and Tommy get to be close. Ringo grew up in an extremely poor village in China, but never went hungry because his parents would often go without food instead; in order to tend to them once he grew up, he joined the People's Liberation Army. When he refused to shoot protestors in Tiananmen Square, he was imprisoned, tortured – and his parents were murdered. He escaped, killed his commanders and fled to New York, where he became a hitman, initially for his cousin, later freelance. Ringo believes that he met Death once, after a hit. Ringo was inspired by Chow Yun Fat's gun wielding characters in movies directed by John Woo.
- Deborah Tiegel: Deborah Tiegel is Tommy's love interest for most of the series. An officer in the Gotham Police Department, she eventually is thrown off the force for not participating in widespread corruption. She lives with her senile grandfather and her mother – with her grandfather implied to be an ex-Nazi, which everyone ignores. She is always referred to as the only truly good person in Tommy's life, and often breaks up with him because he kills people for a living. She is an exceptional marksman, and often provides sniper cover for the heroes amid large firefights.
- Hacken: Hacken hangs out at Noonan's as much as anybody (including Sean) and joins in with the killer talk, but does not seem to be a professional; they mostly just make fun of him. At one point, he refers to himself and Ringo as partners, "just like Tommy and Natt", and Ringo doesn't have the heart to dissuade him. Early on in the series, having become involved in a zombie battle at the Gotham Aquarium, Hacken cuts off his own zombie bitten hand – only to shortly thereafter discover the bite would not in fact have killed him. Hacken wanted to help Tommy and Natt in their final battle but was knocked unconscious by Tommy, so that he'd survive. JLA/Hitman and #50 show that he continues to stay at Noonan's until his old age, and fifty years after Tommy's death he tells some Gotham Uni students the truth about his friends. Hacken is later seen trying to assist Superman with alien difficulty in Metropolis. He had also made friends with long-time Superman fan Bibbo Bibbowski. Hacken is later seen trying to improve his mind by joining a book club. He also keeps an eye out for Sixpack, who has returned to chaos of Noonan's Bar. This is being run by Baytor, a demon from Hell.
- Pat Noonan is Sean's nephew, and Tommy's best friend since childhood. The first time Tommy killed somebody was to save Pat's life. When the series begins, he is Tommy's weapon supplier. He makes fun of Hacken more than anybody else does, and the bar patrons (especially Hacken) regard him as a loudmouth. When Natt arrives, Pat grows more insecure about his friendship with Tommy. To everyone's surprise, he dies rather than talk when Johnny Navarone tortures him for information – a grief-stricken Tommy tells him he wishes Pat had talked.
- Sixpack is a short drunk who thinks he is a superhero. He often has drunken delusions of team-ups with Batman and other heroes. He occasionally leads his superhero team, Section 8. He ends up becoming a real hero, sacrificing himself to save the city from demons. The regulars at Noonan's build a statue to him in a local park.
- Sister Concepta is a nun who works at Saint Killian's. She took a special interest in Tommy growing up, partly because she had a romantic relationship with Sean Noonan.
- Wendy is the first woman Tommy dates in the series. She believes descriptions of his life are humorous jokes, and she dumps him as soon as she finds out they are not. She returns to the series sporadically.
- Baytor is the Lord of Insanity in Hell, until Etrigan steals his crown. He escapes Hell, and becomes the bartender at Noonan's. With rare exceptions, he says only "I am Baytor!" – he says his only normal words in #60 ("goodbye boys"), after Tommy and Natt go to their deaths and when nobody can hear him. He has the ability to project a liquid onto enemies, which dries. The enemies then shatter. He continues to tend Noonan's for at least fifty years.
- Maggie Lorenzo is a poor local woman who first meets Tommy when her son goes missing. Eventually, she turns to Tommy whenever she has a problem. In the final story, she is marked for death by the CIA after seeing something she shouldn't have.
- Kathryn McAllister is Tommy's last love interest in the series. A CIA agent modeled after Dana Scully from The X-Files, she first shows up in a one-page gag in "Local Heroes" (in which she manipulates Green Lantern, as ordered by Agent Truman). In Closing Time, the final arc of the series, McAllister has left Truman's employ and enlists Tommy and Natt to take Truman down.
  - In Ennis' Marvel Max run on the Punisher, he has a CIA agent named Kathryn O'Brien with the same personality and appearance as McAllister: #5 says she was in jail before the CIA rehired her, #21 says she used to have the surname "McAllister", and in #40 she refers to "that stupid bastard Tommy" as the sort of "truly, irrevocably doomed" man she falls for. It is likely they are intended to be the same character.
- Etrigan the Demon initially met Tommy immediately following the Bloodlines parasite attack that grants Tommy's powers, participating in the incident in which Joe Dubelz was killed. He later hired Tommy to kill a rival demon, then refused to pay him. After this betrayal, Tommy teamed up with Jason Blood, the host of Etrigan, to steal Etrigan's heart.

=== Villains ===
- Moe Dubelz is one half of a pair of conjoined twins who share a body. His brother Joe is killed by Tommy, and he swears revenge. The brothers control one of Gotham's major mobs.
- The Mawzir is a demon from Hell who attempts to enlist Tommy's services for its masters, the Lords of the Gun (also called the Arkannone). The Mawzir is formed from the souls of five dead Nazis who were executed by the Russians towards the end of the Second World War.
- Night Fist is a Gotham City vigilante who uses oversized fists as weapons. He also steals criminal's drugs for his own use and profit.
- Johnny Navarone is the best assassin in the world; he travels the world killing only the best local killers. Moe Dubelz hires him to kill Tommy. Later, his son, who is an even better marksman, is hired by Truman to kill Tommy.
- Agent Truman is a CIA agent who is jealous of superhumans. He attempts to hire Tommy as an agent to rein in and possibly kill heroes, and later funds experiments trying to recreate the effects of Bloodlines.
- Doctor Jackson from the Injun Peak Facility always hires Tommy and Natt to clean up his messes when various experiments his scientists are performing escape go wrong.
- "Men's Room" Louie Feretti is one of the main mob bosses in Gotham. He is so named because, due to a medical condition, he requires constant toilet use, from where he conducts all business. Eventually, Tommy is falsely blamed for his death, and various other Ferettis try to take revenge.

== The series ==
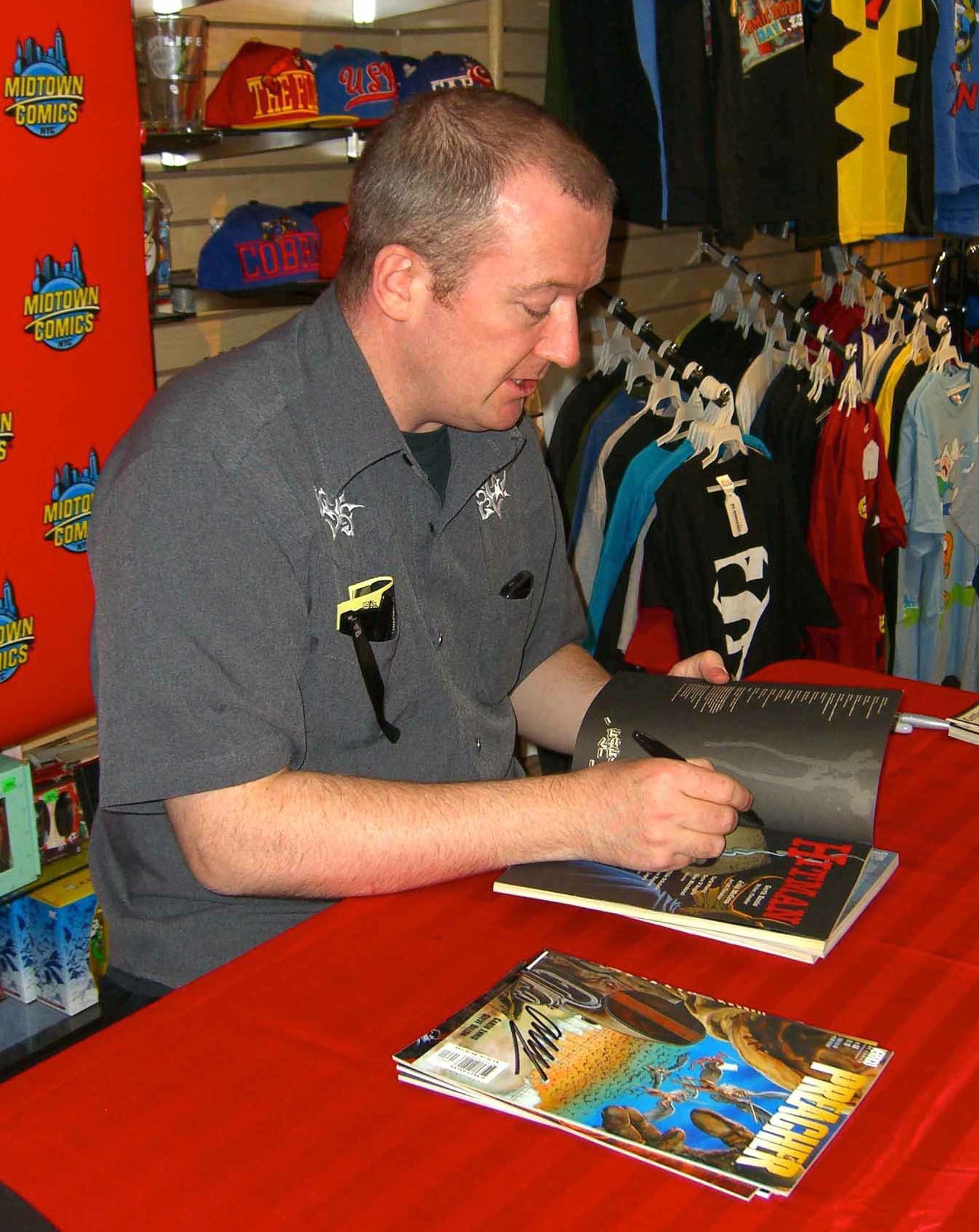
Writer Garth Ennis signing a copy of Hitman volume 1 at an April 19, 2012, appearance at Midtown Comics Downtown in Manhattan

Hitman first appeared during Garth Ennis's run on The Demon during the "Bloodlines" crossover, and subsequently appeared in two further arcs before the series was cancelled. After making a brief appearance in a Batman comic, he got his own self-titled series.

Hitman was first published as a 60-issue comic book series with one annual, one DC One Million tie-in issue, one crossover with Lobo and one appearance in Sovereign Seven #26. Issues were more or less published monthly and most were 22 pages.

Several collections were published in trade paperback, but the second half of the series had initially never been collected. What collections that had been published were left to go out-of-print over the years. In July 2009, DC began reprinting the trades, from the beginning, with some variation.

The character was due to make an appearance in an arc of JLA Classified, and Ennis had this to say about it:

I miss Hitman a lot. Preacher finished when it was supposed to, so there are no regrets with it—but Hitman could have gone on a lot longer. John McCrea and I are actually doing four issues of JLA Classified, featuring what is effectively the "lost" Hitman story, the one that we never had space for in the monthly. Writing Tommy and the boys again was sheer joy".

Because of the backlog of other stories for the series, DC decided to release the story as a two issue miniseries titled JLA/Hitman.

=== Trades ===
Starting in 2009, the entire Hitman series is being reprinted or collected for the first time in seven volumes.

Title	Material collected	Publication date	ISBN
A Rage in Arkham	The Demon Annual #2, Batman Chronicles #4, and Hitman #1–3	June 2009	978-1563893148
Ten Thousand Bullets	Hitman #4–8 and Annual #1	March 2010	978-1401218423
Local Heroes	Hitman #9–14	December 2010	978-1401228934
Ace of Killers	Hitman #15–22	April 2011	978-1401230043
Tommy's Heroes	Hitman #23–36 and #1,000,000	December 2011	978-1401231187
For Tomorrow	Hitman #37–50	April 2012	978-1401232825
Closing Time	Hitman #51–60, Hitman/Lobo: That Stupid Bastich #1, JLA/Hitman #1–2, and a story from Superman 80-Page Giant #1	August 2012	978-1401234003
Hitman’s Greatest Hits	The Demon Annual #2, Hitman #4-7, #13-14, #34, JLA/Hitman #1–2	2019	978-1401299637

Vol. 1: Hitman

- In "Hitman" (The Demon Annual #2), hitman Tommy Monaghan is bitten by the alien Glonth and gains superhuman powers. He teams up with Etrigan the Demon to fight Glonth and kills Joe Dubelz, a mob boss whose conjoined twin brother Moe puts a price on Tommy's head. The issue also introduces Pat, Sean, and Noonan's Sleazy Bar.
- In "Hitman" (Batman Chronicles #4), Tommy takes a hit on a walking biological agent named Thrax who escaped into Gotham, and a "tenth-rate assassin" named Martin Eckstein attempts to earn the Dubelz reward. Eckstein, captured by Batman, reveals that Tommy is going to kill the Joker in Arkham Asylum.
- In "A Rage in Arkham" (issues #1–3), Tommy begins a relationship with a woman named Wendy. He tells her that he is a killer, but she believes it is all an elaborate joke. Tommy enters Arkham by use of stun grenades on several police. Tommy, Batman, Detective Tiegel and the real Joker have multiple encounters; it is all because of the demonic Arkanonne, the Lords of Gunfire, and their agent, the Mawzir, who want Tommy to work for them.

Vol. 2: 10,000 Bullets

- "10,000 Bullets" (#4-7) begins with Moe Dubelz hiring Johnny Navarone to kill Tommy. Navarone hires Tommy (and Natt, newly arrived in Gotham) for a hit and then injures them in an ambush. Tommy makes Natt take him to Wendy's and calls Sean to perform medical services. As soon as Tommy is healthy, she throws them out and dumps him. They go home to find Pat dying, tortured by Navarone for information. Tommy and Nat kill Dubelz, his men and Navarone.
- In "The Night the Lights Went Out" (#8), a crossover with The Final Night, Tommy, Natt, Sean, Hacken and Ringo sit in Noonan's and recount stories of the closest each has come to death. Ringo specifically tells about the time (he believes) he met Death.
- In 2010, this trade was reprinted with an additional story: In "Coffin Full of Dollars" (Annual #1), Tommy and Natt become involved in a power struggle in a small Texan town. The art for the annual was provided by Carlos Ezquerra and Steve Pugh. Kevin Smith provided the intro.

Vol. 3: Local Heroes

- "Local Heroes" (#9–12) opens with Pat Noonan's funeral. Tiegel is kicked off the police force because she is an honest cop, unlike the corrupt Captain Burns, her former boss. He makes an enemy with CIA agent Truman, who wants him for a metahuman killing group. Detective Tiegel works with Tommy; they expose Burns.
- In "Zombie Night at the Gotham Aquarium" (#13–14), Tommy, Natt, Ringo and Hacken take a contract from Injun Peak to stop a scientist from re-animating dead sea creatures. As the title indicates, they fail.
- The initial 1999 paperback included the above-referenced story from the Hitman Annual.

Vol. 4: Ace of Killers

- In "Ace of Killers" (#15–20), the Mawzir tricks Catwoman into stealing the Ace of Winchesters, a Winchester rifle forged in the old West to kill demons. Tommy and Natt form an impromptu alliance with Catwoman (spurned over being manipulated), a surprised Tiegel and Jason Blood, an occultist and the human host of Etrigan the Demon. Would-be superhero Sixpack even reforms his old team Section 8 to help out. A battle in Hell and in church ends with Etrigan the de facto ruler of Hell, the Mawzir dead again and the gun in new hands.
- In "Kiss Me" (#21), a misunderstanding after a romantic night with Tiegel leads to Tommy killing a valued mob officer in self-defense; this incident would have long-term consequences. This issue is the only issue of the series proper not illustrated by John McCrea; the art was done by Steve Pugh.
- In "The Santa Contract" (#22), the Christmas story, a power plant worker mutates into a radioactive Santa. Tommy is hired to kill him.

Vol. 5: Who Dares Wins (2001)

- "Who Dares Wins" (#23–27, epilogue in #28) involves a squad of British SAS soldiers (Captain Page, Sergeant Eddie Baker, Plug, and Whitey) assigned to kill Tommy and Natt over a Gulf Storm "friendly fire" incident. This correlates with 'Men's Room Louie', a Mafia boss mad over Tommy's self-defense killing. The SAS, who do not survive the confrontation, manage to kill off Louie; Tommy and Nat are believed to be the killers.
- The issues in this trade were included in the larger "Tommy's Heroes" collection released in 2011.

Vol. 5: Tommy's Heroes (2011)

- "Who Dares Wins" (#23–27, epilogue in #28)
- In "Tommy's Heroes" (#29–33), looking to get away from the Men's Room Louie heat, Tommy and Natt (along with Ringo and Hacken) take a job offer in Africa. They are to train an army filled with forcibly enlisted unskilled men to fight the rebels, who are selling heroin to fund their insurgency. Tommy befriends a British Airborne soldier named Bob Mitchell who was friends with Eddie Baker (from "Who Dares Wins"). They soon realize that President Kijaro and his superhuman bodyguards, Scarlett Rose and the Skull, are evil. They meet the rebels, and Tommy is convinced to help install their leader, Christian Ributu, in Kijaro's place as long as he stops dealing heroin. Ributu is warned not to be like the other rulers, or Tommy will return.
- Hitman #1,000,000 was published as part of DC's One Million crossover. Tommy is transported to the 853rd century by some punks who believe that he was a hero and he corrects their mistaken belief quite violently. Tommy also meets the successor to fellow Bloodlines hero Gunfire.
- In "Of Thee I Sing" (#34), a starstruck Tommy meets Superman on a Gotham rooftop. Superman has just rescued a group of astronauts, but was unable to save the final man. Everyone believes Superman will save them if need be, and he struggles under the burden of representing the power of the United States. Tommy tells him that the America that he represents is about the opportunity for people from all over the world to cast aside old baggage and join in the melting pot. Cheered up by the pep talk, Superman thanks Tommy and signs an autograph before flying back to Metropolis. He remains oblivious to the fact that Tommy is actually on the roof to assassinate a local criminal.
- In "Katie / Father's Day" (#35–36), Tommy's half-sister Frances comes to Gotham and explains his family history. His mother was a local prostitute who named her children after their fathers. Tom Dawson was a violent man who did not want his secrets exposed and killed her. Dawson later tracks down Frances and tortures her to death; Tommy kills Dawson in revenge.

Vol. 6: For Tomorrow (2012)

- In "Dead Man's Land" (#37–38), Tommy and his friends destroy a nearby vampire nest; he befriends a local woman named Maggie.

- This is a crossover with the Batman arc No Man's Land. The characters discuss many of the seemingly yearly big events and how they relate to them. It also features a vampire character from past issues of Hellblazer written by Garth Ennis.

- In "For Tomorrow" (#39–42, epilogue in #43), Tommy tells Tiegel he loves her, and she asks if he loves her enough to quit being a hitman, theoretically. Ringo has been seeing Wendy (from the first two arcs), but she realizes he is a hitman and dumps him. Ringo is targeted by the father of a man he had killed. Tommy becomes swept up in the events; Ringo does not survive the battle. Tommy later kills the father. The arc was dedicated to John Woo and Chow Yun-fat.
- In "Fresh Meat" (#44–46), while at the Injun Peak scientific facility, a mistake literally leads Tommy and Natt to the time of the dinosaurs. Then a pack of T. rexes, led by the clever Scarback, come to Gotham in the modern day. Many are killed, but the rest decide to go home because the pollution made the city and its people literally distasteful.
- In "The Old Dog" (#47–49, epilogue in #50), Louie's granddaughter Isabella celebrates her wedding, and her uncle Benito Gallo (a knife-wielding Mafia hitman) offers to kill Tommy. Benito's attempt only wounds Tommy. While recuperating, Tommy finally realizes Sean is his 'true' father; having raised him all these years. A battle breaks out, with Tommy and his friends holed up in Noonan's bar. Eventually, Benito is taken hostage. This ends badly, as Benito slips his bonds while alone with Sean and both men end up killing each other. The epilogue happens fifty years later; four friends are sightseeing through Noonan's, because of a book based (loosely) on Tommy's exploits. They meet an aged Hacken, who tells them that Tommy killed dozens (excepting children) at Isabella's wedding; a brief scene shows her dead body draped over the altar. The title is the inscription that Sean has requested on his tombstone. In the end, Tommy instead puts "Beloved Father".

Vol. 7: Closing Time (2012)

- Hitman/Lobo: That Stupid Bastich: In this one-shot crossover, Lobo comes to Noonan's one night. Tommy gets in a fight with him and is pursued across town. He uses perverted blackmail to get the alien to leave him alone.
- "How To Be A Super-Hero!": Around the time of #34, Ennis wrote this short story in Superman 80-Page Giant #1. Sixpack dreams that he is patrolling Metropolis, and Superman asks to tag along. Superman lectures him about the need for proof, the downside to burning prisons, and not stabbing muggers with broken bottles.
- In "Super-Guy" (#51–52), an Injun Peak scientist and colleague of Doctor Jackson possesses his assistant with a group of demons known as the "Many-Angled Ones". The assistant, who now has the power to literally pull any object from his rectum, goes on a rampage and Tommy and Natt are sent to deal with him. They successfully kill the assistant, only to free the Many-Angled Ones in the process. Meanwhile, Sixpack sees the commotion and convinces a disillusioned and directionless Section 8 to rally and defeat the menace. The demons promptly slaughter most of Section 8, while gloating that nothing will stop them from turning Earth into Hell. Sixpack's deluded bravery still impresses them, so he is challenged to a fight for his soul, with Earth's existence on the line. Sixpack agrees, and he and the demons disappear forever afterwards; and a statue is erected in his memory. Bueno Excellente is the only presumed survivor of Section 8 from the attack (he avenges the team by sexually assaulting Doctor Jackson to death); however, a man resembling Sixpack in his civilian identity is seen at an AA meeting, seemingly at peace.
- In "Closing Time" (#53–60) the final story, the Mafia put a $2,000,000 contract on Tommy's head after the wedding massacre and many would-be assassins try to collect. Tiegel's grandfather dies, and Tommy tells her they cannot see each other any more, because he is bad for her. He gives her all the money he has saved, and she goes to New York. CIA agents in the employ of Truman (from "Local Heroes") want to kill Maggie Lorenzo (from "Dead Man's Land") because she saw an escaped subject of his experiment duplicate the effects of the Bloodlines incident. Maggie seeks out Tommy, and finds him at the bar. Kathryn McAllister (from "Local Heroes") arrives, saying that she has left Truman's employ over his growing paranoia regarding superhumans. She contacts her friends at the FBI who want to take Truman down, but they offer only a helicopter with very little support.

Truman hires Marc Navarone, the son of Johnny Navarone (from "10,000 Bullets"), to kill Tommy, whom he regards as a loose end. An aging policeman named Connolly (mentioned in "The Old Dog") hears about the CIA plots, and kidnaps Tommy to protect him as a posthumous favor to Sean. After a few flashbacks, Natt and McAllister find Connolly's apartment and free Tommy without killing Connolly. Tommy, Natt, and McAllister shoot up Truman's place, slaying many of Truman's men in the process. They are so overwhelmed by the horrors of Truman's experiments that Marc gets the drop on Tommy, but, having never killed anyone outside of practice, he accidentally leaves the gun's safety on. Tommy snatches the gun and shoots him.
Truman escapes and gathers his remaining two hundred men. McAllister picks up the helicopter and heads to Noonan's, where Tommy and Natt share one last beer. They walk outside, and Truman's men open fire. Tommy loses multiple fingers due to a well-placed bullet. Connolly is forced to watch, but has been forbidden to interfere by the Gotham PD brass. Natt is shot in the chest, but kills his attacker. Moments later, he falls during the run for the helicopter. He pleads with Tommy not to leave him alive to be experimented on. McAllister tries to get Tommy to stay on the helicopter, but he runs back to defend his friend. Tommy lays down covering fire; Truman catches a bullet between the eyes and dies. Tommy is shot down by the remaining men. The series ends with a badly wounded Natt and Tommy fantasizing about a version of Noonan's where the beer is free, no guns are allowed and all their deceased friends are alive.

=== JLA/Hitman miniseries ===
Clark Kent is being interviewed about Superman's connection to notorious killer Tommy Monaghan. Taking the conversation off the record, he tells a story of how the JLA intercepted a rocket which was filled with a new strain of the Bloodlines virus. They needed a living being who had been exposed to the virus already and survived. Batman took the chance to grab Tommy, whom he regarded as a minor nuisance, killing two birds with one stone.

In the Watchtower, Batman criticizes Green Lantern for having teamed up with Tommy, until Superman walks in and is pleased to see Tommy. Batman tells Superman that Tommy is a killer, and Superman is suddenly torn, because the advice Tommy had given is still helping him. The rocket arrives at the moon. The White House, in fear of the aliens, launches nuclear weapons at the Watchtower.

The corrupted astronauts invade. Each has their own powers. The JLA soon find themselves powerless. The team mount a counterattack but, one by one, most fall. Wonder Woman sacrifices herself so Tommy can continue on. Tommy talks an infected Superman into overcoming his own alien.

Over the course of the battle, Tommy kills all the astronauts and the aliens. The nuclear attack on the Watchtower is called off.

Superman is torn, but the rest of the League are critical of Tommy's actions. Batman has him arrested, but the cops who process him are local 'Cauldron' boys and release him in lieu of gambling debts.

In the present day, Superman admits that he admires Tommy's moral courage in the extreme situation and mourns his passing.

== Other appearances ==
Prior to his own series, Hitman was introduced during Garth Ennis's run on The Demon. After the aforementioned appearance in Annual #2, he appeared in two later arcs:

"Hell's Hitman" (#42–45) – Etrigan, newly appointed as "Hell's Hitman", is at war with Lord Asteroth, an Archfiend of Hell, over the fate of Gotham. After being overwhelmed by his Choirboy Commandoes, Etrigan hires Tommy to take out Asteroth in issue #43. Tommy telepathically learns that Asteroth is sacrificing people to bring about Hell on Earth. He shoots the Choirboy Commandoes and Asteroth's other men, but flees rather than kill police officers. Etrigan deals with the supernatural menaces, but decides not to pay Tommy for his services.
"Suffer the Children" (#52–54) – After Jason Blood's daughter is born, he decides to destroy Etrigan. He hires Tommy to help him, specifically guarding him against Merlin (Etrigan's half-brother). Tommy only agrees because Blood promises him $2,000,000. Etrigan escapes and kidnaps the baby, and, when Merlin aids him, Tommy shoots the magician. Blood saves the baby, and Tommy defends him while he steals Etrigan's heart, binding Etrigan to Blood's will.

He also made an appearance in Batman Chronicles #4, building to the release of the series. The Annual and the Batman issue are included in the first trade paperback.

During Grant Morrison's run on JLA, Tommy was briefly considered for membership. The only reason he shows up is to check out Wonder Woman with his X-ray vision, after which he turns down their offer due to low pay.

He has also appeared in the titles Azrael, Sovereign Seven and Resurrection Man, none written by Garth Ennis. The majority of Sovereign Seven is considered non-canonical due to the revelation in the last issue.

He cameos in 2014's Batman and Robin #27, where Batman escapes into Noonan's bar from the old Gotham Prohibition tunnels. In the bar Batman meets Hacken, who offers him and his prisoner a drink. Batman declines and leaves, passing pictures of all the main cast of Hitman.

== Awards ==
Hitman won the Best New Comic (International) National Comics Award for 1997.

Dogwelder (from the team Section 8) was voted "Best New Character" of 1997 by the readers of Wizard.

Hitman issue #34, the Superman-starring "Of Thee I Sing", won the 1999 Eisner Award for Best Single Issue, presented to Ennis and McCrea. Issue #1,000,000 was a part of the DC One Million storyline, which was a top vote-getter for the Comics Buyer's Guide Fan Award for Favorite Story for 1999.

"For Tomorrow", in issues #39–42, was a top vote-getter for the Comics Buyer's Guide Fan Award for Favorite Story for 2000.
