= Zenith (comics) =

British comic superhero

- Zenith on the cover of 2000 AD prog 792, by Steve Yeowell.

Character information
- First appearance: 2000 AD #536 (August 1987) (1987)
- Created by: Grant Morrison; Brendan McCarthy; Steve Yeowell

In-story information
- Full name: Robert Neal Cassady McDowell
- Abilities: Initially flight, strength, & durability, later telepathy & pyrokinesis.

Publication information
- Publisher: Originally IPC Media (Fleetway), now Rebellion Developments
- Schedule: Weekly
- Formats: Original material for the series has been published as a strip in the comics anthology(s) 2000 AD.
- Genre: Horror, superhero
- Publication date: August 1987 – December 2000
- Main character(s): Zenith; Mandala; Lux; Voltage

Creative team
- Writer(s): Grant Morrison
- Artist(s): Steve Yeowell; Jim McCarthy (Mandala: Shadows & Reflections); Manuel Carmona (Interlude 3: Maximan)
- Letterer(s): Mark King; Gordon Robson "Johnny A"(Interlude 3: Maximan)
- Colourist(s): Gina Hart
- Editor(s): Tharg (Richard Burton)

Reprints
- Collected editions
- Book 1: ISBN 1-85286-030-8
- Book 2: ISBN 1852861371
- Book 3: ISBN 185286172X
- Book 4: ISBN 1852862629
- Book 5: ISBN 1852862637

Zenith is a British superhero comic strip which appeared in the magazine 2000 AD. Created by writer Grant Morrison and artist Steve Yeowell, with original character designs by Brendan McCarthy, the story first appeared in 2000 AD #535 (22 August 1987). Zenith himself (real name Robert McDowell) did not appear until the second episode – the first episode set the backdrop for his introduction.

Shallow and sarcastic, Zenith was a distinctly Generation X superhero, featuring regularly in 2000 AD from 1987 until 1992, with occasional appearances since. The series was an early success for Morrison, who has since written popular works for DC and Marvel, using their own characters. The first series won the 1987 Eagle Award for Favourite Single or Continuing Story.

== Publication history ==
Zenith appeared in August 1987 during a period when editor and assistant editor, Steve MacManus and Richard Burton respectively, were shaking up 2000 AD by publishing numerous new stories which gave fresh talent a chance. Grant Morrison had been thinking along the lines of Zenith since 1982, but "[t]he original version had a more traditional superhero costume and was a little grimmer in tone", and the final concept came together as "... a reaction against torment superheroes". Despite liking both Dark Knight and Watchmen, they felt that "... both books felt pompous and concept albumy to me as a young man in the '80s". They found more of an influence in the work of Brendan McCarthy: "... tell the truth on to the page and let your psyche all hang out" and it was McCarthy who would provide the initial character designs, although he never drew the actual story, because Morrison said "... the story as it unfolded would have been too ponderous and long-winded for him".

With hindsight, Morrison stated: "I like Phase I the least now –- it wears its influences a little too obviously on its sleeve". They rated Phase III far higher, considered as "one of the greatest superhero crossover events ever".

In America, Zenith Phases I and II were reprinted in colour in Fleetway/Quality's monthly 2000 A.D. Showcase title, beginning in the jointly numbered issue #29/30, and running through issue #45 (September 1988-December 1989). These issues featured new covers by American comic book artists such as Jackson Guice, Tom Lyle, and Bart Sears. According to the series' index at the Grand Comics Database, "the end of the Phase II storyline was also the end of the Zenith reprints, as Phase III was still in progress in the British weekly. It ended in March of 1990, but by that time [2000AD Showcase] was about to be cancelled".

Zenith returned for Phase IV in 1992 but Morrison's attention was elsewhere: "I'd moved on and was more excited by the possibilities of working with American superheroes. By 1992, Zenith seemed like something dragged up from my past". This however does not mean they think any less of the story: "I like a lot of things I write under duress. I actually really like the last book of Zenith. I'm very fond of it".

Titan Books published five trade paperbacks of Zenith between 1988 and 1990, collecting Phases I through III. For years after that, attempts to re-publish the series (including the never collected Phase IV) were prevented by a copyright dispute between the publisher and Morrison. In 2007, Morrison explained: "Fleetway have no paperwork to confirm their ownership of Zenith, so I'm currently involved in legal proceedings to clear things up".

In 2013, British publishing company Rebellion Developments began publishing a complete collection as a hardcover book limited to 1000 copies. The book sold out within two days of being announced and the delivery date was brought forward to early October. The book collected all four phases and has a nearly exhaustive collection of covers and pin-ups. Whilst parties involved in ongoing legal proceedings are, as a rule, barred from speaking publicly of them, it appears that Morrison has been unsuccessful in halting that initial publication. Zenith Books 1 and 2 could be pre-ordered for a December 2014 launch through mainstream distribution chains. In 2023, the entire series was reprinted in two hardback volumes by Hachette Partworks.

A new Zenith text story, "Permission to Land", appeared in prog 2050 in September 2017. It was written by editor Matt Smith, with a new illustration by Steve Yeowell.

Zenith also appeared in a story unconnected to the Zenith universe – "A Night 2 Remember", a strip about '2000AD{'}s 25th anniversary celebrations, which appeared in prog 1280.

== List of stories ==
All written by Grant Morrison and illustrated by Steve Yeowell, except where otherwise indicated.

- "Phase I" in 2000AD progs 535–550 (1987)
- "A Zenith Interlude 1: Whitlock" in 2000AD prog 558 (1988)
- "A Zenith Interlude 2: Peyne" in 2000AD prog 559 (1988)
- "Phase II" in 2000AD progs 589–606 (1988)
- "Interlude 3: Maximan" (art by Manuel Carmona) in 2000AD Winter Special 1988
- "Phase III" in 2000AD progs 627–634, 650–662, 667–670 (1989–90)
- "A Zenith Interlude: Shadows & Reflections" (art by Jim McCarthy) in 2000AD Annual 1990
- "Tales of the Alternative Earths" (text story by Mark Millar, illustrations by Simon Coleby), in 2000AD Winter Special 1990
- "Phase IV" (colours by Gina Hart) in 2000AD progs 791–806 (1992)
- "Zzzzenith.com" in 2000AD "Prog 2001" (after prog 1222) (December 2000)
- "Permission to Land" (text story by Matt Smith, credited to "Martin Howe") in 2000AD prog 2050 (2017)

== Plot ==
Steve Yeowell's cover to Zenith Book one.

=== Phase I ===
Originally published in 2000AD Progs #535-550 (15th August - 28 November 1987)

A flashback to 1944 shows the battle between the British super-soldier Maximan and his more powerful German counterpart Masterman in Berlin. The latter is actually Iok Sotot - one of the Lloigor or Many-Angled Ones - and easily defeats his opponent, but the Allies have planned for Maximan's failure and the USAAF drop an atomic bomb on the city destroying Masterman's body. In present-day 1987 and a rebuilt Berlin, former Nazis known as the Cult of the Black Sun engineer Iok Sotot's resurrection in an improved Masterman body. He decides to eliminate all possible opposition by neutering the surviving members of 1960s British superhero group Cloud 9. However Ruby Fox, formerly Voltage, survives the attempt on her life by regaining her powers under duress. She attempts to recruit Zenith, the son of her two missing former team-mates Dr. Beat and White Heat who uses his own powers entirely to promote his career as a pop star. He is initially apathetic until Ruby says she'll tell him what happened to his parents if he helps. They approach Peter St. John, formerly Mandala of Cloud 9 and now a key Conservative MP in Margaret Thatcher's government who has faked losing his powers. He dismisses them but is visited by Masterman soon after and warned to stay out of the forthcoming battle.

Instead they travel to Wales to visit Siadwel Rhys, formerly the powerful pyrokinetic Red Dragon. He has slipped into alcoholism, after losing his powers. Zenith drops him from high altitude to re-awaken his flying ability, and then his pyrokinetics. They are able to sober him up and recruit him but when they return to London it is already under attack by Masterman, who kills Rhys. Fox and Zenith fare little better until St. John intervenes, giving Zenith an opening to destroy the host body. This reveals the true form of Iok Sotot, but St. John planted a telepathic post-hypnotic command in its mind during their meeting which he uses to kill Iok Sotot's mind. At Rhys' funeral he dismisses his decision to help as simply being to curry favour ahead of the general election - and soon after he is returned as MP for Hertfordshire South and promoted to Minister of Defence, with the heavy implication he has used his psychic abilities to secure his promotion. While Ruby decides she is going on holiday before she tells Zenith anything further about his parents the affair has benefited him greatly as well, allowing his records to top the charts.

Short interlude episodes focusing on Maximan and Doctor Michael Peyne (creator of the world's superhumans) appeared in 2000AD Progs #558-559 (23 - 30 January 1988).

=== Phase II ===
Originally published in 2000AD Progs #589-606 (25th June - 24 December 1988)

In a prelude, Ruby's holiday sees her meet up with David Cambridge and Penelope Moon - Cloud 9 members Lux and Spook, long thought dead - on Alternative 303, an Earth where dinosaurs still exist - as they plan to stop the mysterious "alignment" planned by the Lloigor. Zenith meanwhile is on the verge of a planned American tour when he is attacked in his flat by the huge mechanoid Warhead, controlled by Peyne and Scott Wallace, a computer wizard and owner of Wallace International. He is only saved by the intervention of CIA agent Phaedra Cale, who has been monitoring Peyne. Wallace meanwhile takes over the weapons systems of the nuclear submarine HMS Resolve, aiming two nuclear warheads at Whitehall. St. John attempts to juggle responding to the crisis with visions of a blackened sun and the Omnihedron since his contact with Iok Sotot, while also fielding a brief visit from Spook. Zenith and Cale infiltrate Wallace's base at Schiehallion but are captured by Shockwave and Blaze - Peyne's latest creations, working for Wallace who plans to take over the world and make it a better place. He executes Cale and prepares to launch the missiles.

With the British unable to locate Resolve and unwilling to risk a panic, only elite figures such as the Royal Family are covertly evacuated from London. Meanwhile, Zenith is loosely imprisoned and finds out more about his abilities in discussion with Peyne. The scientist plans to use Zenith, Blaze and Shockwave to breed a race of superhumans to restore the planet - planning to kill him after he impregnates them when his biorhythm is at its lowest and he loses his powers. Peyne tells Zenith his parents were killed by CIA Shadowmen, psychically enhanced hitmen. He used genetic material from White Heat's corpse to create Blaze and cell-scrapings from Fox to create Shockwave - and placed the barely-living Dr. Beat inside the Warhead armour. Peyne leaves Warhead to kill Zenith. However, Zenith's published birthdate is not his real birthday and thus Peyne has miscalculated his biorhythm information. (Note: Zenith's published birthday is 8th January - that of Elvis Presley. His actual birthday is never clarified.) Zenith easily destroys Warhead - killing his father in the process - but Wallace has initiated the launch of the missiles from a secure vault, with a riddle set up as the passcode. Zenith uses his crude telepathy to contact St. John, who is above London and hopes to intercept the missiles. He gets the correct answer and enters, persuading Wallace to abort the launch. Fed up and disinterested, Zenith leaves - while St. John uses his mental powers to trap Wallace in his vault with no electricity. Zenith returns to his flat and is confronted by Chimera, a hugely powerful creature composed entirely of thought, created by Peyne at the same time as the other Cloud 9 members, which after assuming a myriad of shapes turns itself into a small-scale omnihedron.

In an epilogue Lux, Spook and Voltage travel to Ayers Rock and meet with Black Flag, a team of superhumans from Alternate-5 who arrive by Einstein-Rosen bridge and plan to help battle the Alignment when they are interrupted by the arrival of a dying messenger - Jimmy Quick - from another Alternative, fatally injured by the Lloigor.

Another interlude - printed in the 1988 2000AD Winter Special (with art by Manuel Carmona rather than Steve Yeowell) debuts the Maximan of Alternate-23, who survived the atomic bomb and lives at Axis Mundi. Mantra of Black Flag tells him Alternate-257 has fallen, with its defender Hotspur possessed by the Lloigor. She also tells him the history of Zenith, who Maximan claims is their last hope of victory.

=== Phase III ===
Originally published in 2000AD Progs #626-634 & #650-670 (13th May - 8th July & 28th October 1989 - 17th March 1990)

Maximan's allies gather superheroes from myriad alternate Earths, including Zenith and St. John, who are united with the surviving members of Cloud 9 and scores of others at Axis Mundi. He introduces Big Ben from Alternative-666, a world almost completely overrun by the Lloigor and the source of the message brought by Jimmy Quick. Recorded by Prince Mamba, it tells of how the Lloigor possessed the world's most powerful heroes and devastated the planet. The heroes are charged with using powerful Chaostructor bombs to destroy Alternative 666 and Alternative 257 to introduce a flaw and prevent the alignment of the Omnihedron in a month's time, which the Lloigor plan to use to ascend and gain control of all reality. The conference is interrupted by the arrival of Hotspur, who was able to mutilate himself and throw off the Lloigor which possessed him. Ruby Fox meanwhile is shown how to access a youthful energy form by Lux and Spook. Maximan's forces are split into two groups, one dispatched to Alternative 666 and the other to Alternative 257.

The group send to Alternative 666 is led by Ben and includes Zenith, Lux, Robot Archie, Domino, Metamaid, the Blue Magician, Oakman, Tanya, the Steel Claw, Miracle Man, Tri-Man, the Leopard from Lime Street, Fishboy and Catgirl. They are able to kill one of the Lloigor-possessed superheroes, Miss Wonderstarr, and link up with a handful of surviving heroes in the London Underground. However, they are ambushed by the other two Lloigor, in the bodies of Jack Flash and Mr. Why, who kill many of their number. The rest eventually regroup and prepare to destroy the planet and the two Lloigor with it before escaping via an Einstein-Rosen Bridge. The timer on the device is faulty but Alternative-666 heroes Tiger Tom and Tammy stay behind to activate it.

The force on Alternative 257 is led by Hotspur and includes St. John, Voltage, Spook, Mantra, DJ Chill, Vertex (an alternate version of Zenith), Streamline, Ace Hart, Captain Miracle, Electroman, the Black Archer, Thunderbolt Jaxon and Electrogirl. However, they find there are three Lloigor on the planet instead of the expected one, in possession of the bodies of the Wyvern, Mr. Lion and Mr. Unicorn, and suffer large losses. Hotspur is briefly lost following Mr. Lion and Mr. Unicorn through an Einstein-Rosen Bridge and returns paralysed but the arrival of Robot Archie on a Tyrannosaurus buys the group time to set the bomb and escape, destroying Wyvern along with the planet.

Reconvening on Alternative 303, the survivors of both forces attempt to work out if they have been successful. Hotspur dies, but not before using one of his eyes to blink a Morse code message to Ben, who confides in Zenith. He in turn passes the message to St. John and Mantra, who discover Streamline is actually working for the Lloigor. Under interrogation he confesses that Maximan has actually made a deal with the Lloigor, and the destruction of the two alternative Earths has not disabled the Ominhedron but instead removed a flaw in it, and the alignment is in fact now happening. The final part of their plan involves using the Cult of the Black Sun to activate a Chaostructor bomb set on Alternative 230 - Zenith's home dimension. St. John and Mantra head to Alternative 23 to confront Maximan while the remainder travel to the South Pole on Alternative 230, where the bomb is guarded by the Lloigor-possessed Captain Miracle, Ace Hart, Mr. Lion and Mr. Unicorn. At Axis Mundi, Mantra attempts to reason with Maximan but he kills her. St. John battles Maximan but is outmatched until the arrival of the rest of his allies, who have overwhelmed the Lloigor's forces on Alternative 230 and captured the bomb. Maximan attempts to ascend by sheer force of will until the heroes realise they can use the Chaostructor bomb to destroy Alternative 23, taking Maximan with it. Zenith is seemingly left behind in the explosion and mourned but when the survivors reconvene on Alternative 230 it is soon found that it was actually Vertex who died. Those left after the pyrrhic victory are returned to their home dimensions, while Zenith ponders what there is for the superhumans of Alternative 230 to do now.

An interlude - printed in the 1990 2000AD Annual (with art by Jim McCarthy) - details in flashback St. John's refusal to have a child with Fox as part of Cloud 9's Grand Plan and subsequent survival of an assassination attempt by CIA Shadowmen.

=== Phase IV ===
Originally published in 2000AD Progs #791-806 (11th July - 24 October 1992)

His music career booming thanks to cynically tapping into the dance music scene, Zenith visits St. John, showing him Chimera. St. John is now Prime Minister, having taken over from Margaret Thatcher as Conservative leader. Robot Archie also now lives in Alternative 230, carving out a career as a techno artist. Lux, Spook, Voltage and Black Flag survivors DJ Chill and Domino have formed the Horus Foundation and gone public with their Grand Plan. They confront Zenith and St. John in Downing Street, warning them to join them or be treated as enemies. They refuse.

The United States is alarmed by Lux's proclamations and sends CIA Shadowmen to kill the group. Domino, who is now having cold feet about the plan, narrowly survives an assassination attempt but is then killed by Lux, giving the group a reason to devastate the White House. Zenith, St. John and Archie attack them but the latter is destroyed. The Horus Foundation finds Peyne and recruits Blaze (who has given birth to a son fathered by Zenith), though Voltage kills Shockwave to recover her genetic material. They wipe out the rest of humanity but spare Peyne in apparent recognition of his role as their creator. Aging in reverse, he writes his autobiography Seizing the Fire to pass the time despite his awareness that it will never be published while being visited occasionally by his mocking creations.

St. John and Zenith are hunted down, while the other superhumans turn the sun into a huge incubator to power their ascension - showing that their ultimate form is the Lloigor. St. John is finally destroyed in London before Zenith is swallowed by Iok Sokkot, revealed to be the final form of his son. Peyne's de-aging finishes and he blinks out of existence, his book unfinished. The superhuman Lloigor ascend and prepare to dominate the universe, only to be stopped by an invisible barrier.

It is revealed that they were trapped inside Chimera by St. John while threatening him at Downing Street and everything that has happened since then has taken place within a pocket dimension. There are heavy hints that St. John's motives aren't entirely altruistic and that he is instead following his own subtler grand plan, notably when the popular opposition Labour leader John Smith dies of a heart attack shortly before the election, leading to another Conservative landslide. Zenith seems broadly aware of these machinations but is more interested in the partying lifestyle his pop career gives him - the implication being both will leave the other to their own agenda.

=== zzzzenith.com ===
Originally published in 2000AD Prog 2001 (2000)

A one-off strip. In November 2000 Zenith is still a successful pop star and the star of a Channel 4 fly-on-the-wall "hyper-documentary". St. John is still running the country, using vegetative psychiatric patient Tony Blair as a puppet to avoid suspicion. Zenith is aware of the ruse but doesn't care. Britney Spears meanwhile has been sexually assaulted in a London hotel room. One of her fans believes Zenith is responsible and attacks him with a bazooka during a visit to a children's hospital. Zenith survives the attack - though most of the patients and staff are less lucky. The real culprit is Robot Archie, who has become a vicious vigilante after what Zenith calls "brain rust" has set in and escapes on a bus wearing a false beard.

== Collected editions ==
Zenith was printed as a series of (now out of print) trade paperbacks by Titan Books between 1988 and 1991, with Phases II and III both being split across two volumes. The trades gave the three arcs titles - "Tygers", "The Hollow Land" and "War in Heaven", respectively. Each featured a new cover by Steve Yeowell and other backmatter from the creators, but the trades stopped before collecting Phase IV. In 2013, 2000 AD publishers Rebellion re-printed the entire series in a hardcover volume, limited to 1,000 copies. Priced at £100, the book was published on 1 December, and sold exclusively via their website. A series of 4 cheaper books began in 2014, concluding the following year with the first collected reprint of Phase IV. These eschewed the titles used in the Titan books and featured no additional material. In 2023 Zenith was collected in two issues (146 and 156) of 2000 AD: The Ultimate Collection by Hachette Partworks.

=== Titan ===
Title	Material Collected	Publication Date	ISBN
Zenith Book One	Zenith strips from 2000AD progs #535-550	April 1988	1852860308
Zenith Book Two	Zenith strips from 2000AD progs #558-559 & #589-598	June 1989	1852861371
Zenith Book Three	Zenith strips from 2000AD progs #599-606 & 1988 2000AD Winter Special	August 1989	185286172X
Zenith Book Four	Zenith strips from 2000AD progs #626-634 & 650–654	June 1990	1852862629
Zenith Book Five	Zenith strips from 2000AD progs #655-662 & 667–670	August 1990	1852862637

=== Rebellion ===
Title	Material Collected	Publication Date	ISBN
Zenith Phase One	Zenith strips from 2000AD progs #535-550 & #558-559	23 October 2014	9781781082751
Zenith Phase Two	Zenith strips from 2000AD progs #589-606 & 1988 Winter Special	3 December 2014	9781781082782
Zenith Phase Three	Zenith strips from 2000AD progs #626-634, #650-662, #667-670 & 1990 Annual	9 April 2015	9781781083208
Zenith Phase Four	Zenith strips from 2000AD progs #791-806 & 2001	16 July 2015	9781781083451

=== Hachette ===
Title	Material Collected	Publication Date	ISBN
Zenith Volume One	Phase One (2000 AD progs 535–550) Interlude One (2000 AD prog 558) Interlude Two (2000 AD prog 559) Phase Two (2000 AD progs 589–606) Interlude Three (2000 AD Winter Special 1988)	April 2023	9772399777030 46
Zenith Volume Two	Phase Three (2000 AD Progs 626–634, 650–662, 667–670) Interlude Four (2000 AD Annual 1990) Phase Four (2000 AD Progs 791–806) zzzenith.com (2000 AD Prog 2001) Tales of the Alternative Earths (2000 AD Winter Special 1990) Permission to Land (2000 AD Prog 2050)	August 2023	9772399777030 56

== Sequel ==
In 2025, a sequel was published; the first new strip in the series since 2000. Called Red Dragon, it did not feature Zenith, but instead focused on Siadwel Rhys and his legacy. Written by Rob Williams, it featured colour art by Steve Yeowell and black and white art by Patrick Goddard, following storylines in the 1960s and in the present day respectively. It was published in 2000 AD issues 2451 to 2460. There was an epilogue in #2476.

== See also ==
- List of fictional prime ministers of the United Kingdom
