= Lloigor =

Eldritch beings in the Cthulhu Mythos

Lloigor is a fictional deity or a fictional race in the Cthulhu Mythos. The entity first appeared in August Derleth and Mark Schorer's short story "The Lair of the Star Spawn" (1932), and has been used in subsequent fictional works by others though often departing from the original concept. The Lloigor are also referred to as the Many-Angled Ones, apparently beginning with Grant Morrison's Zenith, and some subsequent works use variations on this term in lieu of the name Lloigor.

== Summary ==
=== Derleth's Mythos deity ===
August Derleth and Mark Schorer originally created a being called Lloigor in their short story "The Lair of the Star-Spawn" (1932). Lloigor and its brother Zhar, together referred to as the Twin Obscenities, were typical pseudo-Lovecraftian tentacled monstrosities identified as two of the Great Old Ones. Derleth referred to Lloigor in several other writings, "The Sandwin Compact" (1940) in particular. It was apparently a air elemental that possessed the ability to somehow draw its sacrificial victims to it, perhaps through teleportation.

=== Wilson's alien race ===
Colin Wilson borrowed the name for "The Return of the Lloigor" (1969), but his creatures are very different from Derleth's. The Lloigor take the form of invisible vortices of psychic energy, though they may sometimes make themselves manifest as great reptilian beasts, akin to the legendary dragons. In the distant past, the Lloigor came from the Andromeda Galaxy to the continent of Mu and used human slaves as their labor force. When their power dwindled, the Lloigor retreated below ground and left their former slaves to their own devices. Eventually, these early humans migrated from Mu and populated the earth.

In modern times, the Lloigor are too weakened to pose any real threat to humanity. Nonetheless, they can draw psychic energy from sleeping humans in nearby towns or villages — the victims so affected awaken feeling drained or ill, yet regain all lost vitality by nightfall — with which they can perform strange, preternatural feats, such as causing mysterious explosions or altering the flow of time.

In The Illuminatus! Trilogy (1975), the lloigor are mentioned as the gods of the aboriginal natives of the People's Republic of Fernando Po, as well as the original gods of Atlantis. Here, the term appears to be synonymous with Great Old One—for example, H. P. Lovecraft's creation Yog-Sothoth is called a lloigor.

The term Lloigor is again equated with Great Old Ones in Alan Moore's League of Extraordinary Gentlemen, in the final chapter of "Allan and the Sundered Veil;" here, both terms are used to describe Ithaqqa, a single facet of the self-aware idea known as "Yuggoth". In The League of Extraordinary Gentlemen: Black Dossier, Nyarlathotep is referred to as an emissary of the Lloigor when he is sent to negotiate a truce with the Blazing World at the end of the comic. In The League of Extraordinary Gentlemen Volume IV: The Tempest, a Demogorgon appears and is identified as a Lloigor.

A race of creatures known as Lloigor was the subject of the song "Lloigor" by the atmospheric black metal band Dark Fortress. The song references "A thousand young", most likely referring to the thousand young of Shub-Niggurath. However, the verse of each song refers to a single entity. The Lloigor are also referred to as Yuggoth, a single entity. This is the first connection between Shub-Niggurath and Yuggoth made in this way.

=== The Many-Angled Ones ===
Scottish comics writer Grant Morrison used the Lloigor as the primary villains (possessing the bodies and minds of various superhumans on various parallel earths) in his Zenith series for the British comics anthology 2000 A.D. The names directly corresponded to the names of Lovecraft's Great Old Ones. The name "Iok Sotot" and his epithet "Eater of Souls" came from The Illuminatus! Trilogy where it referred to Yog-Sothoth. They are referred to as "many-angled ones" (possibly the first use of this moniker) and appear to be entities who exist in a space with more dimensions than our own. As a result, when they manifest in our universe they appear as disconnected floating body parts — notably eyes and tentacles — belonging to some larger beast that is complete in the higher dimension, similar to how a three dimensional being would appear in flatland as its parts pass through the plane of that two-dimensional world. The many-angled ones plan to impose rigid geometrical order on the whole universe, essentially reducing it to clockwork. A number of British authors, often those who had previously written for 2000 AD, have since included the Many-Angled Ones in their works under that name.

The many-angled ones were mentioned in Charles Stross's The Atrocity Archives. This work features the usual appearances by "nameless horrors of the abyss," which may or may not be many-angled ones. It is specifically stated – on multiple occasions – that "the many-angled ones live at the bottom of the Mandelbrot set".

The DC comic book Hitman, by Garth Ennis, briefly featured demons called "The Multi-Angled Ones", similar in concept to the Many-Angled Ones of Zenith. These beings killed most of the dysfunctional superhero team Section 8.

The many-angled ones also appear in Simon R. Green's Secret History series of books The Man with the Golden Torc (2007), Daemons Are Forever (2008), and The Spy Who Haunted Me (2009).

In the Marvel Comics cosmic crossover event "Realm of Kings," written by Dan Abnett and Andy Lanning, Quasar travels through a time/space rift to an alternate earth with multiple Lovecraftian elements being part of the everyday reality of that world. There Quasar meets the Revengers, that world's counterparts to the Avengers, who received their powers from the Many-Angled Ones in exchange for adoration and worship from the heroes. That world's Iron Man states that the Many-Angled Ones have outgrown their reality and need a new place to feed and be worshiped. They intend for Quasar to show them the way to his Earth. The Many-Angled Ones are opposed on this Earth by the heroes who believe in pure science, such as the Vision. They later become the antagonists of The Thanos Imperative miniseries, and it is stated that Shuma-Gorath is one.

In the 2010 remake of the video game Splatterhouse, scripted by 2000 AD writer Gordon Rennie, the Many-Angled Ones is one of the names for the demonic race known as the Corrupted.
