= Cor!! =

British comic book

- The cover to Cor!! #1 (June 1970).

Publication information
- Publisher: IPC Magazines Ltd
- Schedule: Weekly
- Format: Ongoing series
- Genre: Humor/comedy
- Publication date: June 1970 – June 1974
- No. of issues: 210
- Main character(s): Ivor Lott and Tony Broke; Whacky; Kid Chameleon; Tricky Dicky; Teacher's Pet

Creative team
- Written by: Scott Goodall; Terry Magee
- Artist(s): Joe Colquhoun; Mike Lacey; Norman Mansbridge
- Editor: Bob Paynter

Cor!! was a British comic book launched in June 1970 by IPC (International Publishing Corporation), their sixth new comic in just over a year. Cor!! was edited by Bob Paynter.

The comic had 32 pages and included full-colour front and back pages and centre spread. It depicted traditional British characters, albeit with a slight tweak. The unruly schoolkids of The Gaswork Gang echoed The Bash Street Kids of The Beano, Tomboy was firmly in the Minnie the Minx vein, whilst Tricky Dicky seemed like a version of Roger the Dodger, albeit with longer hair and shorter trousers.

== History ==
The first Cor!! featured Gus Gorilla on the front cover, drawn by Mike Lacey. The strip was in the shape of a glass, to promote the free fruit drink that came with this issue. The comic's most popular strip was Ivor Lott and Tony Broke, a classic tale of two boys – one rich, one poor, with the latter usually the victor of the many battles they had. The strip continued long after the comic closed, finally ending in the last edition of Buster in January 2000.

Another popular strip, Whacky, debuted in the first edition, initially in a half-page format, sharing space with readers' letters. The strip later added the tagline "He’s always getting whacked" to emphasize the story of a schoolboy who is regularly caned by his sadistic teacher – the equally appropriately named Mr. Thwackery.

The first line-up changes occurred in the 1970 "Bonfire" issue when five new features debuted. 1972 saw three newcomers in the New Year issue, including Victorian miser Jasper the Grasper and Frankie Stein – Teenage Werewolf. One notable later strip featured the BBC comedians The Goodies. Drawn by Joe Colquhoun, the double-page feature lasted the whole of 1973.

Four years and 210 issues later the comic was eventually merged with Buster in June 1974, symptomatic of the diminishing market for British comics - though several further titles were launched by IPC and other publishers during the next few years. The long-running Lion and Scorcher also disappeared in 1974. The Cor!! name was kept alive by summer specials and annuals, finally ending in 1986.

== Recurring features ==
- Andy's Ants
- Chalky
- The Chumpions
- Donovan's Dad
- Fiends and Neighbours
- Football Madd
- Frankie Stein – Teenage Werewolf
- The Gasworks Gang
- The Goodies
- Gus Gorilla
- Herbie the Helicopter
- Hire a Horror
- Ivor Lott and Tony Broke
- Jack Pott
- Jasper the Grasper
- Jelly Baby
- Kid Chameleon
- Little Geyser
- Nightmare
- Rat-Trap
- Swopper Stan
- The Slimms
- Tell-Tale Tess
- Teacher's Pet
- Tomboy
- Tricky Dicky
- Whacky
- Willy Worry
- Wonder Worm
- Young MacDonald And His Farm

== See also ==
- British comics
- History of comic books
- List of best-selling comic series
