= Ian Knox =

Ian Knox (born 4 May 1943, Belfast, Northern Ireland) is a political cartoonist for the Irish News, and also drew cartoons for the BBC Northern Ireland political show Hearts and Minds.

Knox trained as an architect at Edinburgh College of Art (1963–67) and Heriot-Watt University (1967–68), and worked as an architect before establishing himself as a cartoonist. He worked in animation from 1970 to 1975 for Halas & Batchelor in London, Potterton Productions in Montreal, and Kotopoulis Productions in Toronto. He then joined Red Weekly and Socialist Challenge as a political cartoonist, as well as contributing to various children's comics for IPC from 1975 to 1988.

He signed much of his political work "Blotski", and he and Republican News cartoonist Cormac worked together as "Kormski", drawing the anti-clerical strip "Dog Collars" for Fortnight Magazine. Since 1989 he has been the editorial cartoonist for The Irish News, a nationalist newspaper based in Belfast. Since 1996 he has contributed the "As I See It" feature to Hearts and Minds on BBC2 Northern Ireland. From 1997 to 1998 he was political cartoonist for Ireland on Sunday.

Knox has cited Ronald Searle, Low, John Glashan, Vicky, Steve Bell, Pat Oliphant and Charles Addams among those who have influenced him.
