= Smash! (comics) =

British comic book

- The cover of the Smash! annual 1969

Publication information
- Publisher: Odhams Press (1966–1969); IPC Magazines (1969–1971)
- Schedule: Weekly
- Format: Ongoing series
- Genre: Humor/comedySuperhero
- Publication date: 5 February 1966 – 3 April 1971
- No. of issues: 257
- Main character(s): The Swots and the Blots; Bad Penny; Grimly Feendish; Janus Stark; His Sporting Lordship; Hulk (reprints); Batman (reprints)

Creative team
- Written by: Various including Angus Allan, Stan Lee, Al Plastino, Tom Tully
- Artist(s): Various including Graham Allen, Leo Baxendale, Luis Bermejo, Eric Bradbury, Mike Brown, Geoff Campion, Gene Colan, Whitney Ellsworth, Bill Everett, Mike Higgs, Gordon Hogg, Tom Kerr, Jack Kirby, Mike Lacey, Don Lawrence, Solano López, Douglas Maxted, Stanley McMurtry, Angel Nadal, Reg Parlett, Raf (Juan Rafart Roldán), Ken Reid, John Stokes, Wally Wood, Roy Wilson
- Editor(s): Alfred Wallace (Alf) and Albert Cosser (Cos), 1966–1969 "Mike", 1969–1971

Smash! was a weekly British comic book, published initially by Odhams Press and subsequently by IPC Magazines, from 5 February 1966 to 3 April 1971. (Note: Although, due to strikes and industrial disputes, publication was not continuous during that period. In all, there were 13 weeks in which the title was not published.) After 257 issues it merged into Valiant.

During 1967 and 1968 Smash! was part of Odhams' Power Comics line, notable for its publication of American superhero strips. During this period, alongside British humour strips, Smash! included black-and-white superhero reprints originally published in the US by Marvel Comics and DC Comics. In late 1968, Smash! absorbed its sister titles Pow! and Fantastic, thereby becoming the last surviving Power Comics title. In March 1969 Smash! underwent a major relaunch, and thereafter featured solely British content: a mixture of humour, sporting and adventure strips. A further relaunch in 1970 was almost as extensive, with a number of new strips introduced and an equal number cancelled.

Smash! was sized 9.75" × 12" (#1–162) and 9.25" × 12" (#163–257), and had a four-colour cover and black-and-white interior.

== Publication history ==
=== Odhams ===
Smash! was owned by the International Publishing Corporation (IPC), a company formed in 1963 – through a series of corporate mergers – by Cecil Harmsworth King, chairman of the Daily Mirror and the Sunday Pictorial (now the Sunday Mirror). All the comics owned by it were published by one or other of the subsidiary companies brought together to form IPC, including Fleetway Publications (Note: In 1959, Mirror Group purchased Amalgamated Press (AP), and in 1961 took over Longacre Press (previously called Odhams Press, to which name it now reverted). In 1963 Mirror Group was renamed "International Publishing Corporation Ltd" (IPC). The Fleetway name, a holdover from AP, was used to identify that part of IPC's comics publishing arm which derived from AP. In 1987, when the comics division was sold to Robert Maxwell, he continued to publish its comics under the Fleetway name.) and Odhams Press.

Odhams' comics line was produced in London from 64 Long Acre, overseen by managing editor Alfred Wallace. Following the initial success of the anarchic humour comic Wham! in 1964, Smash! was launched (with a cover price of 7d for 24 pages) on 5 February 1966 following a similar model. Early on, Smash! successfully integrated superhero strips — Marvel Comics' the Hulk and DC Comics' Batman — into its lineup, prompting Wham! to do the same (with the Fantastic Four) shortly thereafter.

Odhams branded the two titles, and three more launched in quick succession — all heavily featuring Marvel reprints — as part of the Power Comics line, a gimmick dreamed up by Odhams to unify their five titles under a common banner (Smash! became a Power Comic with issue #44, published 3 December 1966). The Power Comics line was published under a three-man editorial team known as Alf, Bart, and Cos. "Alf" (Alfred Wallace) was the managing editor, and "Cos" (Albert Cosser) was the editor directly responsible for Smash! (Note: Bart was the nickname of Eagle's Bob Bartholemew.)

Odhams comics titles faced their first serious crisis in May 1967. The editorial page warned readers in issue #68 (20 May 1967) that Smash!, initially printed by St. Clements Press Ltd of London, had to find new printers within one month, or face closure. As it turned out, Odhams were able to sign a contract with Southernprint Ltd of Poole in Dorset in time to maintain publication.

On 14 September 1968, with issue 137, the title merged with Pow! (which had previously absorbed Wham), becoming Smash! and Pow!. Later on 2 November, with issue 144, it merged with Fantastic (which had previously absorbed Terrific), becoming Smash and Pow incorporating Fantastic.

As a consequence of absorbing Pow! and then Fantastic, Smash! inherited some of their strips and characters:

- 14 September 1968: Merger with Pow! — inherited The Cloak, Wiz War, Fantastic Four (which had originated in Wham!), and Spider-Man. Also, Smash! later reprinted The Wacks, which originated in Wham!, as Nick and Nat – The Beat Boys.
- 2 November 1968: Merger with Fantastic — inherited The Mighty Thor.

Smash! featured the Power Comics logo on its cover for 100 issues, until #143 (26 October 1968); it was quietly dropped the week Smash! absorbed Fantastic to become the last surviving title in the line.

=== IPC Magazines ===
On 1 January 1969 Odhams Press Ltd ceased operations and Smash! was thereafter published by IPC Magazines Ltd (an IPC subsidiary formed during 1968). The title was now published out of 189 High Holborn; later moving to Fleetway House on nearby Farringdon Road. Major changes of editorial policy occurred in 1969 for financial reasons: on 15 March of that year Smash! was relaunched without its American superhero strips. Further changes followed during the course of 1969, and then a second relaunch at the start of 1970, when IPC was taken over by Albert Edwin Reed to form the publishing giant Reed International.

The final issue of Smash! was published on 3 April 1971; soon after on 10 April it was merged with the IPC title Valiant, forming Valiant and Smash!.

=== Annuals and specials ===
Ten Smash! Annuals were published in hardback, beginning with the 1967 Annual (published in 1966). These appeared every autumn. Even after the magazine's absorption by Valiant, the Smash! annual, published mainly under the Fleetway imprint, (Note: The Smash! annuals were published initially by Odhams Books Ltd (1967-68), subsequently by the Hamlyn Publishing Group Ltd (1969-70), and latterly by IPC Magazines Ltd (1971-76).) continued to appear every year. The final annual, cover-dated 1976, was published in the autumn of 1975.

There were also two 96-page Holiday Specials, published in 1969 and 1970, and a Valiant and Smash! Holiday Special in 1971.

=== Advertising ===
A notable feature of the Odhams years was how few advertisements Smash! carried. There were occasional quarter-page inserts, mainly advertising foreign postage stamps for stamp collectors, or Subbuteo table-football, but they were few and far between, and their combined total didn't usually exceed one page per issue.

Reflecting its financial problems, the relaunched comic under IPC Magazines carried a significantly greater amount of advertising. One obvious change was the back cover (the only in-colour page apart from the front cover), which gradually began to carry colourful full-page advertisements. On the inside pages, too, there was a much more noticeable quantity of adverts: each issue typically carried four full-page ads, plus two half-page ads. It was a noticeable feature of the relaunch that the comic now expanded to 40 pages, in order to cope with the need to carry an extra four pages of advertising in each issue. This was a potentially significant new strategy and a major change of policy. No longer did the profitability of the comic rest exclusively with the income derived from its sales figures. That sales income was now supplemented by advertising revenue, and without even having to sacrifice any significant amount of page space, nor cancel any strips, thanks to adding the additional pages.

== Background ==
In 1966 the initial success of Wham! (which had launched in 1964 and quickly built up strong circulation figures) encouraged Odhams' London management to publish a second title, conceived by Alf Wallace (Managing Editor of Odhams' juveniles – Eagle, Swift and Boys' World) and Albert Cosser. Leo Baxendale, who had created Wham! for Odhams in 1964, was too heavily embroiled with ongoing production on it, providing much of the art for each issue, so had little time for anything else. Also, Baxendale was then still working at long range from Dundee, Scotland (DC Thomson Ltd, Baxendale's former employers, were based in Dundee).

Accordingly, it was Alf Wallace and Albert Cosser (soon to be known to their young audience as Alf and Cos) who determined the initial format of Smash! They also recruited the artists who would draw the early issues, as it was plain that Baxendale was fully occupied with the art for Wham! Hence Baxendale's initial contribution to Smash! was limited to providing a list of titles and situations for the humour strips, together with brief written scenarios (script ideas for the individual weekly issues), which he gave to Wallace to be farmed-out to other artists. The Swots and The Blots was one of these. Ironically, Baxendale's strips would eventually become a major contribution to Smash!, after March 1969, but only because the closure of Wham! freed him to work on Smash! instead.

Initially, Baxendale was asked only to create the Bad Penny strip, and to give Grimly Feendish (a character from his Eagle Eye, Junior Spy strip then running in Wham!) a strip of his own. Wallace also had Baxendale draw the covers for the first three issues, #1 featuring Ronnie Rich and #2–3 starring the Swots and the Blots.

Smash! launched with the same format as the early issues of Wham!, namely 24 pages per issue, four of which were in colour, but it was printed on lower-quality paper than Wham!

== Launch and initial lineup ==
Smash's debut humour strips

The Swots and the Blots by Mike Lacey and later by Leo Baxendale
About two rival gangs — the Swots and the Blots — vying to outwit each other at Pond Road School, with "Teach" caught in the crossfire.

The Man From B.U.N.G.L.E. by Leo Baxendale.
A spoof of the popular TV series The Man from U.N.C.L.E.. Baxendale drew the first few, which appeared as large single illustrations on the front cover of some early issues, after which Mike Lacey took over.

Bad Penny by Leo Baxendal.e
About a mischievous young girl. The title logo featured a portrait of Penny and an illustration of a giant pre-decimal One Penny coin (the coin suggesting the connection with the proverb from which the character's name originated).

Grimly Feendish by Leo Baxendale.
About a creepy but amusing comic book villain whose goal is world domination, which he attempts to achieve using various monsters and outrageous plot devices such as exploding treacle.

Percy's Pets by Mac (Stanley McMurtry).
A small plump schoolboy who fills his family home with an exotic collection of pets, thereby causing a predictable degree of comic chaos for his long-suffering mum and dad. Animals include a parrot, a tortoise, a white mouse, and a hedgehog; as well as (from time to time) such zoo animals as an elephant, a giraffe, a hippopotamus, a snake, and an ape.

The Nervs by Graham Allen and later by Ken Reid.
A group of little characters inhabiting a schoolboy called Fatty, running his body like a group of workers running a factory.

Ronnie Rich by Gordon Hog.g
About the richest kid in the world, who stands to inherit a fortune if only he can get rid of the money he's got. Each week Ronnie spent his last penny, in some reckless or extravagant way, only to have his scheme backfire and make him richer than ever. He never did get his hands on the fortune.

Queen of the Seas by Ken Reid.
The story of the Buoyant Queen and its two-man crew, Enoch and Bert, a pair of oafs with a love/hate relationship (mostly hate).

Space Jinx by Brian Lewis.
A boy in a metal spacesuit who flies around outer space, bringing disaster wherever he goes.

The Tellybugs by Walter Thorburn and George Parlett, with later contributions by Cyril Pric.e
About a crew of tiny creatures wreaking havoc inside the Goggs family's television set. Parlett was known for drawing Young Marvelman for L. Miller & Son in the 1950s, and was the brother of Reg Parlett, one of the top artists for Amalgamated Press.

Smash!'s debut adventure strips

Brian's Brain by Bert Vandeput and later Barrie Mitchell.
Featuring two schoolboys: the eponymous Brian Kingsley and his friend Duffy Rolls. Brian possesses an electronic brain resembling a human skull which he carries about in a box. It can communicate with him telepathically, glowing when active; and it can control the actions of animals if they are within a few yards, which is the limit of its brain-wave transmissions.

The Ghost Patrol by Gerry Embleton [reprinted from Swift.]
Originally set in Crete during World War II, about Sgt. Joe Trimm and a squad of British soldiers who find a time travel machine made by aliens. They visit several eras, along the way capturing evil U-boat Commander Erhart and earning the friendship of a policeman from the future, Cornelius Kerrigan. Originally published in Swift in 1962 under the title Phantom Patrol.

Other early strips

Danger Mouse
Humour strip about a mouse secret agent. It debuted with issue #3 (19 Feb. 1966).

The Legend Testers by Graham Baker and Jordi Bernet.
Science fiction adventure strip about two time travelers from the future — Rollo Stones and Danny Charters — assigned to various points in history to test the authenticity of museum artifacts, which leads to deadly danger every week. It debuted with issue #9 (26 Mar. 1966) following a half-page ad in issue #8 (26 Mar. 1966)

Moon Madness by Alf Wallace and Brian Lewis.
Adventure strip where professor John Silverlight combats a bizarre monster awakened by a Russian space probe. It debuted with issue #9 (2 Apr. 1966) and canceled with issue #15 (16 May 1966).

Charlie's Choice by Brian Lewis.
Humour strip about a boy with a magic television set who can bring the characters in the programmes out from the TV screen into his world. The comic debuted with issue #19 (11 June 1966).

The Rubber Man by Ken Mennell and Alfredo Marculeta.
Superhero strip about an elastic superhero in conflict with his arch-enemy Doctor Fear, it debuted around issue #19. The strip occasionally crossed over with Don Starr feature in Terrific.

Tuffy McGrew by Graham Allen.
Humour strip about a boy who doesn't know his own strength. Debuted around issue #29, lasting until around issue #104; also appeared in the 1970 Smash! annual.

The initial lineup of strips mixed humour and adventure freely, with the comedic Ronnie Rich featured on the cover of the first issue.

=== Humour strips ===
There were typically a dozen British humour strips in each of Smash!'s first 162 issues. The initial lineup of humour strips included three originally by Leo Baxendale — The Man From B.U.N.G.L.E., Bad Penny, and Grimly Feendish — as well Percy's Pets by Mac (Stanley McMurtry); The Nervs by Graham Allen; Ronnie Rich by Gordon Hogg; Queen of the Seas by Ken Reid; Space Jinx by Brian Lewis; The Tellybugs by Walter Thorburn and George Parlett, with later contributions by Cyril Price; and The Swots and the Blots, initially by Mike Lacey.

The Man From B.U.N.G.L.E. was a spoof of the popular TV series The Man from U.N.C.L.E., and like Grimly Feendish was a spin-off from Baxendale's Eagle-Eye, Junior Spy strip in Wham!). The strip was featured on the cover of Smash! fourteen times in the first 18 issues. Bad Penny had some similarities with Baxendale's earlier Minnie the Minx character in The Beano. When Baxendale had been drawing Minnie the Minx, he had concentrated on experimenting with facial expressions and character traits. By the time he began working on Bad Penny his drawing style had matured, with an equal concentration on developing a zany but tight storyline, less emphasis on close-ups of facial expressions, but retaining the essentials needed to put over a character's own personality traits. The strip was popular enough that it survived the changes of 1969, and continued to appear in the new Smash!. When the strip was eventually dropped, Bad Penny herself still continued to appear, making occasional appearances in Baxendale's The Swots and the Blots as a new member of the Blots.

As had happened in Wham!, artists such as Mike Lacey were commissioned from time to time to "ghost" Baxendale's style. The Swots and the Blots was one of these. The strip's origins lay in Baxendale's classroom-based strip The Tiddlers, which had then been running for two years in Wham! (and which continued in Pow! when it merged with Wham in 1968, where it was combined with Ron Spencer's The Dolls of St Dominics to become The Tiddlers and The Dolls). In fact The Swots and the Blots was a direct continuation of The Tiddlers, with only a change of title. The characters (i.e. "Teach" and the Blots), the school buildings, and the situations, all were largely as they had been in The Tiddlers. The only difference was the addition of the Swots, so that Teach now had an ally. The Swots and the Blots reached a new standard of excellence when Baxendale began drawing it for the new-look Smash! from March 1969, but even during the Odhams years, it had wit and a sense of style. In Baxendale's hands, it had notable similarities to his earlier classroom-based strip, The Bash Street Kids, in The Beano.

Subtitled The Rottenest Crook in the World, Grimly Feendish featured the most popular character from Wham!'s Eagle-Eye, Junior Spy. Feendish's ghoulish appearance was based on Uncle Fester from the American television series The Addams Family (and, presumably, on Charles Addams's illustrations from which the TV series was derived). At one point, the strip occupied a prestigious position as the full-colour back cover feature each week, and it survived throughout the entire run of 162 issues published by Odhams (even though, after giving up its back-cover status, it was sometimes ignominiously reduced to only a quarter-page "filler").

Mac's Percy's Pets was often a half-page feature; it proved popular enough that it made sporadic reappearances in the new Smash! after March 1969.

The Nervs was the most bizarre of the Odhams humour strips, depicting a group of little characters inhabiting a schoolboy called Fatty: the strip shows them running Fatty like a group of workers running a factory. Allocated two pages, it followed the same formula as Baxendale's strip Georgie's Germs from Wham!. The Nervs was drawn by Ken Reid in its final months during 1968–69. Under Reid's direction, The Nervs turned into an extremely surreal, even visceral, strip; achieving a rare level of hilarity and bawdiness, in a subversive presentation of comical horror – and in the process alarming IPC's management.

Reid's The Queen of the Seas was a masterpiece of comic artistry. Many readers failed to understand (amongst many things in the strip that went over their heads) that the two main characters were drawn in the likeness of comedians Stan Laurel and Oliver Hardy, and that the strip's humour was based on their movies. Perhaps too intelligent for its target audience – its disappearance was a great loss to the comic.

Lewis' Space Jinx was the first and only character to hold the coveted colour centre pages of Smash!. It is unclear why Alf and Cos chose this deeply unfunny strip for what must have been considered the pride of place in the new comic. Space Jinx was primarily another Jonah (a strip by Ken Reid which had run in The Beano), except that it could not hold its own against the brilliance of Reid's sea-faring twit. Space Jinx was replaced in issue #16 (21 May 1966) by The Incredible Hulk reprints; Lewis soon returned with Charlie's Choice, about a boy with a magic television set who can bring the characters in the programmes out from the TV screen into his world. It was a device for featuring, as guest stars in the strip each week, an assortment of popular TV stars. The strip's debut, for instance, featured Robert Vaughn and David McCallum of the top-rated secret agent show The Man From U.N.C.L.E., maximising their appearance by splashing them across the front cover. The strip sought to capitalise on the enormous popularity of television — a popularity which was seriously harming comics sales. The hope was that by bringing popular television stars into Smash!'s pages, this would make TV's growing popularity work for the comic – a not very subtle ploy to boost its circulation and sales.

Another early strip based on the spy craze of the Sixties, though not featured in Smash #1, was the humour strip Danger Mouse, about a mouse secret agent, which debuted in issue #3 and ran until the summer of 1967.

=== Adventure strips ===
For most of the Odhams years, Smash! was essentially a humour and superhero comic, with few traditional adventure strips. Notable adventure series in the first hundred issues include Moon Madness by Alf Wallace with art by Brian Lewis, and The Legend Testers by Jordi Bernet and Graham Baker. The Rubber Man by Ken Mennell, drawn by Alfredo Marculeta, also had some adventure elements, but was essentially a superhero strip with the central character 'borrowed' from Marvel's Fantastic Four.

Only three adventure strips debuted in issue #1. These were The Ghost Patrol by Gerry Embleton, Brian's Brain by Bert Vandeput, and The Legend Testers; the latter two both had science fiction overtones. The Ghost Patrol, a war strip, was actually a reprint of a strip originally called Phantom Patrol that ran in Odham's Swift in 1962 and 1963. The Ghost Patrol only lasted until issue #26, as it was symptomatic of the British adventure strips that plagued Smash! during the Odhams years, which tended to be "sloppy in presentation and possessed of little real character or emotion". Brian's Brain was cancelled after issue #15 (14 May 1966), but was revived 18 months later in issue #93 (11 November 1967) and then lasted until the March 1969 relaunch. After being cancelled in 1967, the time traveller feature The Legend Testers was revived in the 1970 Smash! Annual.

Some adventure strips had begun in Pow!, which was absorbed into Smash. The Python, written by Alf Wallace, was a Pow! feature, debuting in Pow! #1 (21 January 1967). Experiment X by Ed Feito was also a Pow! (science fiction) feature, debuting in Pow! #44 (18 November 1967).

== June 1966 overhaul: bring on the superheroes ==
=== Superhero strips ===
==== The Incredible Hulk ====
After only five months – foreshadowing many, many reshuffles to come – Smash! underwent its first major overhaul: black-and-white reprints of Marvel Comics strips, all written by Stan Lee, were introduced into Smash! with issue #16 (dated 21 May 1966) when the Incredible Hulk began (drawn by Jack Kirby). As was standard practice with UK reprints of American comics, due to the larger UK page size, pages from the original American comics were rearranged (and sometimes panels dropped altogether) to fit.

It's hard to overstate the significance of the introduction of The Hulk. It was the first Marvel Comics strip featured by Odhams, the success of which led to the introduction of the Fantastic Four into Wham! on 6 August of that year, and to the launching of two entire comics entirely dedicated to Marvel superheroes – Fantastic and Terrific – in 1967. The Hulk's initial appearance in Smash! took up a massive six pages, one-quarter of each 24-page issue, pushing fully five existing strips out of that issue, and causing the cancellation of Space Jinx and Brian's Brain (although the latter would be revived much later).

One early issue of Smash! even printed an original Hulk story, hastily produced as a filler when there was a problem with the originally intended reprint material. Titled "The Monster and the Matador", it was published in Smash! #38 (22 October 1966).

When Smash! caught up to the final issue of Incredible Hulk that Marvel had published in America, Odhams turned to the Hulk's "guest star" appearances in Fantastic Four and The Avengers (these stories too were drawn by Jack Kirby), and these other Marvel heroes proved equally popular.

==== Batman ====
With issue #20, DC's Batman became the second American superhero to debut in Smash!, crashing onto the front cover a month after the Hulk's debut, in re-edited reprints from American daily and Sunday newspaper strips (these were credited in-page to Batman creator Bob Kane, but were actually drawn by Al Plastino and ghost-written by Whitney Ellsworth). This was a response to the sudden and enormous popularity of the Batman television series starring Adam West. Batman with Robin the Boy Wonder took over the front cover (eventually holding that spot for better than a year and a half, 94 covers), whilst Grimly Feendish lost the colour back cover to Reid's Queen of the Seas, which shrank from its original two pages each week to only a single page. The loss of the extra page was a setback, but was compensated for by the strip now having a more prestigious location in the comic, and of course by now being in colour. The expansion of the American content, with the arrival of Batman, meant the loss of two more of the initial British strips: the reprint strip The Ghost Patrol, and the humour strip The Tellybugs.

Initially, this syndicated newspaper strip adopted the camp style of the television series, with appearances by humorous guest stars such as American funnyman Jack Benny. In the later part of the run (which featured serious, rather than camp, stories) Batgirl, too, appeared in the strip, a response to her addition to the TV show in its third season: in the newspaper strip, Batman initially believed her to be a criminal rather than a crime fighter. Superman then co-starred in the strip, which was retitled Superman and Batman with Robin the Boy Wonder, as Batman and Robin attempt to save Superman from the diabolical Professor Zinkk, who was secretly poisoning him with kryptonite.

When, after two years, the popularity of the Batman television series eventually faded, from issue #114 onward Batman and Robin were moved to the inside pages, yielding the front cover to the long-running success The Swots and the Blots.

==== Other Marvel heroes ====
In July 1967 (issue #76) Daredevil (drawn at various times by Bill Everett, Wally Wood, and Gene Colan) joined the Hulk in Smash!, replacing it altogether with issue #82, Smash! having exhausted all Hulk stories, from all sources, which had been published in the USA up to that time.

In September 1968 the Fantastic Four began a six-month run in Smash!, when it absorbed Pow! (which had previously merged with Wham!, in which the strip had initially featured). As one of only a handful of Pow! strips to survive the merger, the Fantastic Four was used to lure Pow! readers to the new comic. The strip was introduced to readers of Smash! with the wedding of Reed and Sue from Fantastic Four Annual #3. Their adventures continued with "Defeated by the Frightful Four" (Fantastic Four #38 [May 1965], and ran through to "Lo, There Shall Be an Ending!" (Fantastic Four #43 [Oct. 1965]), which was the final Marvel story to appear in Smash! (published in issue #162, 8 March 1969).

Spider-Man reprints, by Stan Lee and Steve Ditko, which had been a mainstay of Pow!, also joined the new Smash! and Pow! in the same issue as the FF's debut (#137); these, however, lasted only through issue #144 (2 Nov. 1968).

Thor began a short run in November 1968 when Smash! absorbed Fantastic. The stories, continued from Fantastic, began with Thor battling the Growing Man (from Thor #140, May 1967); when the Marvel reprint strips were discontinued the following spring, the final Thor story had a new ending substituted, in a rushed attempt to resolve a continuing sub-plot.

The financial crisis which overtook Odhams in 1968, resulting in the closure of all the other Power Comics, also caused them to give up the expensive licence to reprint the Marvel superhero stories. This decision took effect in March 1969, when the licence came up for renewal; the final Marvel strips appeared in issue #162. The expensive Batman newspaper strip had already been discontinued, ending in issue #157.

== Baxendale's departure for Fleetway ==
Leo Baxendale, whose strips dominated so much of Smash! in its early years, left Odhams in 1966, moving to Fleetway Publications, another IPC subsidiary. All the same, he still contributed strips to Smash! — just not under his own name. For instance, for strips like Bad Penny and Grimly Feendish, Baxendale penciled the drawings, and Mike Brown, an animator by trade, inked them in. In this way, they together turned out large numbers of the strips, which they sold to Odhams under Brown's name — a situation Baxendale referred to, in his 1978 autobiography, as working "undercover":

I was in a delightful situation. Working under my own name, a lot was expected of me. Publishers expected me to cram my drawings with funny detail. A double standard operated. Working undercover, I was able to reduce the layouts to the simplest terms. Backgrounds were minimal or non-existent – just a horizon line. And there was no ancillary comic detail – just the characters acting out the storyline against an empty backdrop.

== Collapse of the Power Comics line ==
New humour strips inherited from Pow!

The Cloak by Mike Higgs
Secret agent strip about The Cloak, the top agent for Britain's Special Squad, nominally a part of Scotland Yard, but he usually operates from his personal headquarters, known as the Secret Sanctum. The Cloak's ingenuity and a never-ending supply of gadgets and secret weapons give him the edge over his somewhat odd enemies (some are very odd, including Deathshead and various other agents of G.H.O.U.L.). He has some equally odd colleagues. Assisted initially by Mole (the tall one with the bald head, big nose, and spectacles) and Shortstuff (the short squirt with the hairy nut and big eyeballs), he then begins having adventures in which he finds himself also alongside the sexy and flirtatious Lady Shady, the shady lady.

Wiz War by Mike Brown
The "War" in the title refers to a feud between two wizards, Wizard Prang (Note: "Wizard Prang" was RAF slang from the Second World War.) and his enemy Demon Druid. Other than the fact that Prang is robed entirely in white, befitting his status as the good guy, and Demon Druid is always in black, being the villain of the piece, their costumes are quite similar — a flowing wizard's robe with stars on it, and a pointed hat. They fly around on broomsticks, zapping each other with spells which turn the other into a toad or something equally amusing (Spy vs. Spy). Wizard Prang is alternately helped and hindered by Englebert, his pet bird. The best feature of the strip is the sign above Wizard Prang's front door. This usually reads "Wizard Prang is... In" (if he is at home) or "Wizard Prang is... Out" (if he is out and about); but if he's had a bad time in the story, the sign would often make a humorous remark in the final panel, such as "Wizard Prang is... All at Sea".

Smash! and Pow! Incorporating Fantastic new adventure strips

At Night Stalks... The Spectre
A crime reporter on the Daily Globe newspaper is apparently killed while investigating a news story. The world believes newspaperman Jim Jordan is dead, but he still carries on his crusade against crime, calling himself The Spectre (Note: Not the DC Comics character of the same name.) (The Spirit). Jordan/The Spectre is now fighting crime, rather than merely reporting it, using an array of gadgets that make it seem he is the ghost of the missing reporter. Hence his opponents are terrified to find that if they shoot him he doesn't die (thanks to a bullet-proof raincoat). And he has a secret underground hideout beneath the statue erected in his memory, from which he covertly and unexpectedly emerges, or disappears into, under cover of an artificial fog, to give the impression he is coming and going from the spirit world. In his first case he tracks down Black Murdo, the racketeer who the world believes had murdered him.

Destination Danger
A motor racing serial about a feud between a young English racing driver, Jeff Jackson, who is working for Puma Motors in the U.S., and his enemy Vic Stafford, the Puma team's chief driver, who has taken a bribe to throw a forthcoming race.

Laird of the Apes
A science fiction strip set in the 18th century. A young Scottish laird returns to the Highlands to aid his outlaw clansmen in their struggle with the English Redcoats, bringing with him a band of highly trained apes. The strip was created to milk the popularity of the big-budget Charlton Heston motion picture Planet of the Apes which had been released earlier that year.

King of the Ring
A sports adventure strip about wrestling champion Ken King (although in the earliest strips he began as a boxer). As was not exactly uncommon in the Odhams years, there was a tendency to give the characters silly names. The most outrageous example in this strip was King's manager, who (in spite of not being Irish) was called Blarney Stone. Blarney's real name was originally Tim Stone, and Blarney was only a nickname, but this was soon forgotten. In order to fulfill Ken's ambition to travel, Blarney agrees to manage him on a world tour, if he'll agree to fight his way around the world.

=== September 1968: Pow! merger ===
Smash! and Pow! Incorporating Fantastic #144, 2 November 1968.

Whereas 1968 began with all five Power Comics titles apparently flourishing, by the year's end only Smash! was still being published. The increasingly frantic series of mergers — first when the already-merged Pow! and Wham! was absorbed by Smash! with issue #137 (14 September 1968) and then when the already-merged Fantastic and Terrific was absorbed by Smash! and Pow! with issue #144 (2 November 1968) — resulted in ever more ludicrous titles, culminating in the astonishing Smash and Pow Incorporating Fantastic (commonly spoofed as Smash, Pow, Wham, incorporating Fantastic and Terrific).

One of the major causes of the collapse was the repeated decline in 1968 of the value of the pound sterling against the U.S. dollar; this significantly increased the cost of publishing the American strips (which had to be paid for in dollars), and raised the daunting specter of further increases if the pound fell in value yet again. Increasing the cover price of the Power Comics titles to compensate was impossible because of stiff competition (with sales on a sharp downward spiral, as circulation fell victim to the ever-increasing popularity of television); so the fall in the value of sterling made the American strips unaffordable.

Some of Smash!'s best-remembered strips were acquired in the merger with Pow! — which had already absorbed the most popular strips from its previous merger with Wham!. The most notable of these strips were The Cloak by Mike Higgs, and Wiz War by Mike Brown. The Cloak, a secret agent humour strip, benefited from the unusual, idiosyncratic drawing style of Higgs, whose overt inclusion of pop culture imagery made the strip seem extremely modern. Brown's Wiz War evoked Mad magazine's Spy vs. Spy in its portrayal of an ongoing feud between two wizards. Brown seems to have been unaware of the house rule banning artists from signing their work, as the strip often bore his name. Wiz War became one of a handful of strips to survive the changes of 1969.

The canceled strips in the merger with Pow! were the Smash! strips Charlie's Choice, Ronnie Rich and The Man From B.U.N.G.L.E.. Also lost in this merger, in effect, was Pow!'s Dare-A-Day Davy strip by Ken Reid, one of several established features which were dropped instead of transferring to Smash!.

=== November 1968: Merger with Fantastic and Terrific ===
Although desiring to discontinue the expensive American superhero reprints, Odhams were unable to immediately terminate their contracts with the American publishers, DC and Marvel. This could only be done gradually, when each contract came up for renewal. Thus, as each Power Comics title closed, its superhero strips were usually discontinued.

A tipping point was reached in issue #144, when the merged Smash! and Pow! - as it now was - lost its Daredevil and Spider-Man strips, which together had comprised a full third of each 24-page issue, but had to accommodate both Thor and Fantastic Four from discontinued titles — plus a slew of new British adventure strips, which were being added in preparation for the comic's impending transition to solely-British content and the new 40-page format.

To plug the gap left by the loss of the American strips, four adventure serials were introduced in issue #144: At Night Stalks... The Spectre, Destination Danger, Laird of the Apes, and King of the Ring. All four strips featured cliff-hanger endings each week. Fantastic Four and Thor, the last survivors of all the mergers, lasted in Smash! until the final Marvel contract expired in March 1969; the Batman strip also continued, until January 1969.

All this could not be achieved within the standard Smash! format of 24 pages. IPC "bit the bullet" and, in a single bound, with issue #144 increased the page count from 24 to 36 pages (a fifty per cent increase), with a consequent sharp rise in production costs, and so a marked decline in profit-per-copy. IPC's intention was to reproduce with Smash! the successful formula which was buoying-up sales of their most popular titles, Lion and Valiant, both of which were 36-pagers: in effect, to produce a clone of them: an identical mix of adventure and humour, with an identical page count, at an identical price.

As sole survivor of the Power Comics line, Smash! couldn't hope to generate enough income on its own to meet the actual losses incurred due to the line's sudden contraction. In fact, it didn't need to. Because the Power Comics line was published by Odhams Press Ltd — a subsidiary company with limited liability — it was possible to ring-fence all debts on the Odhams publications within that one company, thus preventing any losses affecting the rest of the IPC Group (since IPC's other titles were all published by other IPC subsidiaries). Accordingly, with effect from 1 January 1969 Smash! was transferred to IPC Magazines Ltd, a new IPC subsidiary formed during 1968, leaving Odhams with no continuing titles; Smash! started again from scratch. (Note: Odhams Press Ltd continued in being until 7 January 1998, when it changed its name to Formpart (No.11) Limited, which still exists today, currently a dormant private company.)

== IPC takes over ==
First new IPC strips

Sergeant Rock — Paratrooper by John Vernon [reprinted from Hurricane]
World War II stories of Sgt. Rock and the "Red Devils" of the Parachute Regiment, it originated in Hurricane (where it ran 4 July 1964 – 8 May 1965), and was continued in Tiger when it absorbed Hurricane in the issue dated 15 May 1965.

Bunsen's Burner
Ben Bunsen is the owner of a vintage steam-driven car known as "the Burner". Ben and his pal drive the Burner around the world, as a condition of Ben inheriting his uncle's fortune; a rival claimant is secretly out to stop them.

In January 1969 Odhams ceased to exist as a publishing imprint, and Smash! now became an IPC Magazines publication. Despite being the longest survivor, and inheriting many popular strips from the other four Power Comics titles, Smash! was only a limited success.

Most of the consequences of the change in publisher didn't become apparent until the issue cover-dated 15 March, in which the comic changed dramatically, dropping the last remaining Marvel superhero strips, to shed the expense of the licensing fee for using them (having already dropped Batman), and ending many other strips too. Two new adventure strips joined the lineup, however: Sergeant Rock — Paratrooper and Bunsen's Burner. They were really a part of the coming relaunch, but were introduced slightly ahead of time to disguise that fact.

Within the British market, boys' comics for the age group which was too old for titles such as The Beano, The Dandy and Sparky tended to focus around adventure, sport and war (in titles such as Lion and Valiant), or humour (in titles such as Buster). In abandoning its superheroes, Smash! sought to attract readers of both types, by offering traditional adventure as well as humour.

Introduced with issue #156 (25 Jan. 1969), the reprint strip Sergeant Rock — Paratrooper featured World War II stories of the "Red Devils" of the Parachute Regiment. Initially, Sgt. Rock (Note: Not the DC Comics character of the same name.) is merely a narrator, introducing stories featuring other characters, so that the strip is actually tales-of-the-parachute-regiment rather than tales of Rock himself. This was a device for reprinting old war stories from other comics. The reprints in Smash! were reasonably successful, running for a year; and Rock eventually featured as more than just narrator, with later editions sending him into action with the SAS, and marking the change by altering the title to Sergeant Rock — Special Air Service. This change was noticeable also by a change of artist; seemingly – from the similarity of style – to the artist on the discontinued humour wartime strip Nutt and Bolt the Men from W.H.E.E.Z.E..

Bunsen's Burner was introduced in issue #158 (8 Feb. 1969). It was an adventure yarn with humorous overtones (hinted at in its title, a reference to an item familiar to most schoolboys from chemistry class). Ben Bunsen is the owner of a vintage car known as "the Burner" because it is so old it is steam-driven. Like an old-fashioned steam train, it has a boiler which has to be stoked, as it runs on coal instead of petrol. Ben and his pal have to drive the Burner around the world, as a condition of Ben inheriting his uncle's fortune, but a rival claimant (shades of the later Smash! strip His Sporting Lordship) is secretly out to stop them. Bunsen's Burner was discontinued during the reshuffles of August 1969, when various changes were quietly made to the title over the course of a month.

== March 1969 relaunch ==
March 1969 relaunch strip turnover

New strips: The Battle of Britain, Big 'Ead, Cursitor Doom, Eric the Viking, His Sporting Lordship, The Incredible Adventures of Janus Stark, Master of the Marsh, Nutt and Bolt the Men From W.H.E.E.Z.E., Rebbels on the Run, Wacker, The World-Wide Wanderers
Canceled strips: At Night Stalks... The Spectre, The Cloak, Destination Danger, Fantastic Four, Grimly Feendish, Laird of the Apes, The Man From B.U.N.G.L.E., The Mighty Thor, The Nervs

March 1969 new humor strips

Nutt and Bolt the Men From W.H.E.E.Z.E.
World War II spoof set in 1940, featuring an English scientist named Professor Nutt, a boffin inventing eccentric secret weapons for a department of the War Office known as W.H.E.E.Z.E. (short for "Weapon Handling Early Experimental and Zoning Establishment"). Nutt is kept out of trouble by his Army "minder", Sgt. "Lightning" Bolt. Nutt and Bolt perpetually clash with a cunning Nazi scientist named Doktor Skull. As the title implies, the strip was born out of the earlier popularity of The Man From U.N.C.L.E. television series.

Big 'Ead by Angel Nadal [reprinted from Buster]
Half-page strip of the misadventures of a Mr. Know-It-All character, summed up by the strip's catchphrase, continually bellowed at the lead character by his irate victims: "Have a care there, Big 'Ead!" A half-page strip, it was originally published in Buster in 1960–61.

Wacker by Raf (Juan Rafart Roldán) and Roy Wilson (alternatingly) [reprinted from Buster]
Subtitled He's All at Sea, the crazy antics of Royal Navy Mis-leading Seaman Wacker, who is forever driving the captain of HMS Impossible to a nervous breakdown. Despite the Liverpudlian overtones of his surname, Wacker seems not to be a Scouser – which may be because it is not his real name. The strip was originally titled Elmer, when it ran in Buster between 1960 and 1964.

March 1969 new sporting strips

Master of the Marsh by Tom Tully and Francisco Solano Lopez
About Patchman, a strange hermit who lives in the East Anglian fens. He is appointed as the new sports master at Marshside Secondary School, nicknamed "The Marsh", because he is the only person who can control the kids – a group of hooligans known as "the Monsters of the Marsh" (there is an association of ideas between fens and marsh, reinforced by the fact that Patchman camps in the inaccessible heart of the marshes). Patchman is a burly woodsman who has always lived in the Fens, and can communicate after a fashion with the local wildlife, for whom he acts as a protector. The strip initially featured humorous stories about the attempts of Knocker Reeves – the worst of the "monsters" – to get the better of the new teacher. But eventually, it transpires that Patchman is secretly the guardian of a collection of relics left behind by Hereward the Wake, a warlord who had fought the Norman invaders in the Fens during the 11th Century. In this respect, the strip has an occasional tendency to embrace science fiction overtones.

His Sporting Lordship by Douglas Maxted
Henry Nobbins had been a labourer on a building site until he inherited the title of Earl of Ranworth and five million pounds. Before he can touch the money, however, he has to become champion in a number of sports. He also has to evade the nefarious attentions of Mr Parkinson, a rival claimant to the fortune, and Parkinson's villainous henchman, Fred Bloggs. Lord Henry, as he has now become, is more than ably assisted by his butler, Jarvis, whom he inherited from the previous Earl. Jarvis proves indispensable. Henry is never portrayed as anything other than an able athlete and a good-natured bloke, leaving Jarvis to supply the cunning which is (frequently) needed to defeat the dastardly Mr. Parkinson and prevent Henry's ancestral home, Castle Plonkton, from being turned into a glue factory.

The World-Wide Wanderers
Short-lived football strip with humorous overtones about a League football team composed of eleven players from eleven different countries (not so unusual today). Football manager Harry Kraft finds himself a passenger on a ship passing through the Suez Canal; ships from all over the world call there, and the crews conduct impromptu soccer matches to while away the time in port. Some of the crews have been stranded there, and constant soccer practice (since there is nothing else to do) has caused them to develop fantastic footballing skills. Kraft ships eleven of them, from as many different countries, back to England; and they use their highly unorthodox individual skills to play as a team in the old Fourth Division.

March 1969 new adventure strips

The Incredible Adventures of Janus Stark by Tom Tully and Francisco Solano López
An escapologist in Victorian London who appears to be simply an unusual act on the music hall stage, but who privately used his extraordinary abilities to battle against injustice. Stark has an unusually flexible bone structure, enabling him to get out of an astonishing variety of tight situations. The protagonist was born in 1840 as the orphan Jonas Clarke. His background story explains that he was sent to an orphanage where he was mistreated, but escaped and lived in the streets. There he befriended a beggar, Blind Largo, who taught him pickpocketing, but also trained Clarke's unique gift for body bending and escaping. As an adult, Clarke takes on the persona of Janus Stark.

Rebbels on the Run by John Stokes
Featuring three young brothers with the surname Rebbel who run away from an orphanage to avoid being split up. After a few months, the strip took an amazing turn and – renamed The Rebbel Robot – became a science fiction serial, when the boys discover that their late father's mind is preserved within the brain of a robot, which becomes their unofficial guardian. They all embark on a quest to track down a criminal known as The Genie, who had murdered their real father – who, in a further improbable turn of events, turns out to be a secret agent.

Cursitor Doom by Geoff Campion and later Eric Bradbury
Spooky and atmospheric series about sorcerer Cursitor Doom, master investigator of the strange and mystic, fighting the dark forces of evil, ably assisted by the pounding fists of his assistant, Angus McCraggan. Doom battles against genuine spirits and sorcerers, in tales including The Case of Kalak the Dwarf, The Sorcerer's Talisman and The Dark Legion of Mardarax, in the latter encountering a haunted (and unstoppable) Roman Legion brought back to "life" by the evil Mardarax. Doom's pet Raven, Scarab, who, by scratching with his claw, can write messages in the dust for Angus McCraggan, is often of more help to Doom than the perpetually baffled McCraggan. The strip had various artists during its one-year run, but far and away the most effective of them was the talented Eric Bradbury, and it is mainly his serials, including the magnificently atmospheric Dark Legion of Mardarax, from which the strip's enduring reputation derives.

The Battle of Britain by Geoff Campion and John Stokes [reprinted from Lion]
Secret agent Simon Kane fights against Baron Rudolph, a usurper who has seized control of Britain using a secret weapon. The weapon emits a sound wave that paralyses anyone who isn't protected against it. Rudolph sets up a police state, similar in emblems and uniforms to medieval England at the time of King John, and Kane leads the resistance against him. The hero was originally called Vic Gunn. The editorial staff of Smash! decided to change the names of the leading characters from Gunn and Barrel to slightly less absurd ones, and so were born secret agent Simon Kane and his assistant Tubby. This had been a very long-running strip in Lion, so much that Smash! actually ceased publication in April 1971 before it had reprinted the entire run from Lion, and in the final issue created an (unconvincing) new ending for the serial.

Eric the Viking by Ken Bulmer and Don Lawrence [reprinted from Lion]
Set in the Dark Ages, featuring its eponymous Viking hero who fights a weird but impressive collection of legendary and fantasy monsters. It is well-remembered under its original title, Karl the Viking. (Note: The change of name to Eric probably reflects on the continuing fame (during the 1960s) of a real-life Viking leader in Dark Age Britain, Eric Bloodaxe, who history records was king in Viking York in the 10th Century.) The strip was originally published in Lion in 1960–1964.

IPC had waited three months to relaunch Smash!, because, on the one hand, it needed some lead-time in which to ready new strips, and, on the other, in the publishing industry spring was traditionally considered a good time to launch a new comic. With the first relaunch issue (#163, dated 15 March 1969), Smash! then introduced a new cover feature, new strips, and free gifts. In all but name, it was a new comic.

The symbol of the change was the new cover feature, Warriors of the World (replacing The Swots and Blots, which, drawn by Mike Lacey, had occupied the cover during the final part of the Odhams years (50 covers in all); The Swots and the Blots survived — and prospered — on the inside pages, now drawn by Leo Baxendale). The Warriors of the World cover feature was an illustration of a historical army or militia with a short text description. The relaunch issue's cover feature was entitled Warriors of the World No.1, and Smash!'s former numbering was discontinued. To have maintained the original sequential numbering alongside the Warriors of the World series could only have caused confusion.

With the relaunch, Smash! firmly placed itself within the world of British boys' comics (whereas it had previously appealed to both genders), proclaiming itself "Britain's Biggest Boys' Paper". Within the UK market, boys' comics for the age group which was too old for titles such as The Beano, The Dandy, and Sparky tended to focus around adventure, sport, and war — in titles such as Lion and Valiant — or humour — in titles such as Buster. The revamped Smash!, now comprising 40 pages, sought to attract readers of both types, by offering adventure serials, humour strips, and sporting strips – but strictly no American superheroes. Smash! thereby became the last ever British comic to feature a varied mix of adventure, humour, and sports-themed stories. Subsequent boys' comics featured exclusively sports, or war, or humour; such as Scorcher and Score and Shoot (which featured only soccer), and Action and Battle (which featured only war stories).

One other aspect of the change: under the umbrella of IPC Magazines Ltd, the editorial team of Alf and Cos was replaced by a single editor, identified only as "Mike". A hallmark of the new editorial policy of mixing serious and humorous strips was the even-handedness with which the editorial staff drew the multitude of reprint strips featured in the new Smash!: there were strips from both Lion — such as Eric the Viking (originally Karl the Viking) and The Battle of Britain (originally Britain in Chains) — and from Buster — such as Wacker (originally Elmer). The number of reprint strips, which were significantly cheaper than commissioning new strips, was another significant indicator of the title's troubled financial situation.

Of the former Odhams strips, only a handful survived. Humour strips that continued were The Swots and the Blots, Wiz War and Bad Penny. Additionally, Percy's Pets made occasional appearances (but did not appear every week). Much mourned were the loss of The Cloak and The Man from B.U.N.G.L.E., dropped due to the waning popularity of spy spoofs (in 1968 even the TV series The Man from U.N.C.L.E. had been canceled). And especially mourned was the loss of Ken Reid and The Nervs. The serious offerings fared even worse. The only genuine survivor from the adventure strips of the Odhams years was King of the Ring, and even that had only begun with issue #144, in November 1968.

In light of how few strips of any sort survived from the Odhams era, and given that none of the superhero strips survived at all (which, according to the letters pages (Note: It was a feature of the Odhams years that the comic included a page for readers' letters, like the American comics published by Marvel and DC on which it was based, but the letters page was dropped in March 1969 in favour of extra advertising space.) were the most popular feature of the Power Comics line), it would be stretching the truth to say that Smash! inherited the best of the Odhams strips. Stylistically, The Swots and the Blots was the most creative and sophisticated Odhams strip (save only The Nervs), and it did survive. However, it was only one strip. And The Nervs, which was objectively a more sophisticated strip in 1968, did not.

Moreover, the publisher was taking a significant risk by re-launching the former Power Comic as, in effect, a clone of IPC's most popular titles, Lion and Valiant. The publisher hoped it could repeat the success of those titles by copying their successful formula. Nevertheless, without its discontinued superheroes Smash! had nothing unique about it that might attract new readers, featuring as it did a mix of strips reprinted from (or based on the style of) Lion and Buster.

=== Humour strips ===
As under Odhams, humour continued to play a large part in the relaunched comic (in terms of the page count), not to the extent it did in Buster, but at least as much as in Valiant or Lion. Yet it was not only in the plainly cartoon-style strips that humour flourished in the new Smash!. Many of the ostensibly more serious offerings were, in reality, humour strips: in particular, His Sporting Lordship and The World Wide Wanderers, but there was also a strong humorous undercurrent in the new lead serial, Master of the Marsh.

Leo Baxendale's The Swots and the Blots was one of the handful of surviving Odhams strips, which after the relaunch moved from the prestigious front cover to the centre pages. Nevertheless, now drawn by Baxendale, it became a standard-bearer for sophisticated artwork. Baxendale began a five-year run on the strip (beginning in Smash! and continuing in its successor, Valiant and Smash, with some fill-ins by Les Barton), by adopting a new style, one which influenced many others in the comics field, just as his earlier The Beano work had done; and in the process attaining a new, deliriously daft, high standard, one rarely approached by other strips.

=== Sporting strips ===
Sporting strips were now the order of the day, most notably Master of the Marsh by Tom Tully and Francisco Solano Lopez, His Sporting Lordship by Douglas Maxted, the football strip The World-Wide Wanderers, and King of the Ring, the only surviving sports strip from the Odhams, which continued to prosper. Possibly feeling the strip was suffering in the credibility stakes, the new editorial team made a decision to change the name of King's manager, the aforementioned Blarney Stone. They threw Blarney out of the series and substituted a new manager with a less silly name: "Ballyhoo Barnes". Even so, Blarney reappeared after a few weeks, back by popular demand.

His Sporting Lordship proved to be the most successful (certainly the most long-running) of the new sports-based strips; it ultimately became one of the few to outlast Smash! itself, continuing on into Valiant and Smash and then Valiant and TV21.

=== Adventure strips ===
The other staple of the new Smash! was adventure serials, and far and away the most successful of these was The Incredible Adventures of Janus Stark, written by Tom Tully and illustrated by Francisco Solano López. This brings up the matter of economics once more. Solano Lopez was a foreign illustrator, born in Argentina, who worked at a studio in Spain. For reasons of cost, IPC had taken a policy decision to source artwork from cheaper sources outside the UK. Along with the presence in the new Smash! of reprint strips, which were much cheaper than commissioning new strips, this is yet another indicator of the financial pressure the comic was still under, and the absolute necessity of cutting production costs to the bone in order to make it financially viable. The strip was about an escapologist in Victorian London with an unusually flexible bone structure, which enabled him to get out of an astonishing variety of tight situations. There was more than a touch of Reed Richards (from the departed Fantastic Four strip) in Stark's uncanny abilities. Stark's flexible bone structure, which was the basis of his career as an escapologist in the theatres, was perhaps more akin to Rubberman, a character who had featured in Smash! in 1966. Lopez's dark, moody artwork also gave the strip a perfect 19th century setting.

As a mark of Janus Stark's popularity, from week 30 it replaced Master of the Marsh as the lead serial on page 3 (swapping places with the latter, which was thus relegated to an inconspicuous location on pages 12 and 13). The strip was one of the few to survive the merger of Smash! into Valiant in 1971, and is still well-remembered today.

Other adventures strips added in the March 1969 relaunch were Rebbels on the Run, Cursitor Doom, and the reprint strips Eric the Viking and The Battle of Britain (which, in spite of the title, had no connection with the Second World War).

== August 1969 changes ==
August 1969 new strips

Send For... Q-Squad by Eric Bradbury [reprinted from Buster]
The adventures of a handpicked group of six specialists who were assigned to unusual missions that required special expertise both in the air and on the ground. The strip was another of those initially drawn by one of IPC's best British artists, Eric Bradbury, and at other times by the Spanish-based artist Luis Bermejo Rojo, and in its final months mainly by Fred Holmes. Because the strip had a regrettably short run in Smash! (from 16 August 1969 to 30 January 1970 only), most of the run features art by Bradbury. It was originally published in Buster from 1960 to 1964 under the title Phantom Force 5.

The Handcuff Hotspurs by Edmond Ripoll
Hard-as-nails former prison sports instructor 'Toff' Morgan (so-called for his habit of always wearing a top hat) takes over the management of the ailing First Division side Haversham Hotspurs. Morgan begins to rebuild the team by "framing" ex-criminals who he'd known while working in various prisons, forcing them to sign on with the club in order to make use of their dishonest skills as footballing talents. These convicts become the "handcuff hotspurs" of the title. The club's former manager, Reg Jessup, constantly tries to sabotage Morgan's efforts, in order to persuade the directors to re-appoint him instead.

The Touchline Tearaways by Mike Lacey
Football-themed strip featuring three mad-keen supporters of Grimshot United, a totally useless English Football League team perpetually in danger of being relegated, as it is made up entirely of ailing and decrepit players. Each week the Tearaways – Hairy, Lug'oles and Clever Dick – execute some scheme from the touchline to help Grimshot win that week's fixture, usually involving a battle of wits with officials from the Ministry of Football, who, not unnaturally, try to put a stop to the Tearaways' well-intentioned cheating. The name of the club, Grimshot United, was a humorous indication that the team was not very good (i.e. that the players were "grim shots"). Each strip features a single match, with a plot based around helping the team overcome that week's opponent. Clever Dick masterminds all the ploys used in helping Grimshot, and apart from occasional words of congratulation or encouragement, he is generally the only "Tearaway" who has dialogue in the strip. Hairy and Lug'oles tend to be merely a pair of walking visual gags: Hairy's features are perpetually invisible behind a vast mass of long black hair that covers his entire face and head, and Lug'oles has a pair of enormous ears.

Tri-Man
The adventures of Johnny Small, a teenage hero with triple superpowers (hence the name Tri-Man), given to him by Professor Meek. He leaps about rooftops (shades of Spider-Man), and gets his powers from a ray device once every 24 hours (shades of DC's Green Lantern).

After 22 weeks, in August 1969, a new round of changes occurred. Six months earlier, various humour strips had been introduced as replacements for the (far more surreal) humour of Ken Reid, whose strip The Nervs had so disturbed IPC's management. Another change was now forthcoming, one which reflected the pervasive sporting theme of the relaunched Smash!: two new soccer strips began — the humour strip The Touchline Tearaways, and a serious strip entitled The Handcuff Hotspurs (replacing the departed – and rather more humorous – World Wide Wanderers).

In addition, Nutt and Bolt the Men from W.H.E.E.Z.E. was dropped, and replaced from the 23rd issue by a more serious World War II strip, Send For... Q-Squad. This, too, in keeping with the need to cut costs, was a reprint, marked out as such by its unique style – which was both different from, and grimmer than, all the other strips. Whereas Sgt Rock emulated Lord Henry (and Janus Stark), by maintaining a huge and confident smile, regardless of how much trouble he was in, no one in Q-Squad ever stopped looking worried. (Note: Its status as a reprint was also signaled by the fact that Q-Squad was plainly not the original name of the team. Some panels showed evidence of the name having been inserted over a previous one: a change in the lettering style for the name 'Q-Squad' and any adjacent words – which used a different lettering in a cruder style wherever the name appeared, but nowhere else.)

These three new strips represented a minor change of emphasis, replacing two of the more whimsical offerings with two entirely serious strips; the third new entry (which was only a single-page) was simply one outright cartoon strip replacing another.

Furthermore, the editorial column admitted receiving complaints from readers about the loss of the Marvel superhero strips. So, six months after Fantastic Four and Thor had been dropped, an all-British superhero called Tri-Man appeared, debuting in the issue dated 13 September; the character also featured in the Smash! Annual that Christmas. Some indication of the effort put into this character is the fact that he was given sole possession of the front cover of the Annual. The strip did not prove popular, however, and quietly vanished in the reshuffles of 1970.

Thus, within six months, a number of the strips introduced in the relaunch had already bitten the dust.

The most obvious problem faced by the new-look Smash! was the constant "churn": the incessant turnover of strips. Without its solidly popular superhero strips to rely on, the editorial staff seemed pathologically incapable of settling on a fixed line-up. (Note: Continual change of line-up was not a problem unique to Smash!, but was shared by all IPC's comics of this period. Editors struggled to find strips sufficiently popular to halt the decline in weekly sales, but making so many changes was self-defeating because it harmed reader loyalty.)

== 1970 relaunch ==
1970 relaunch strip turnover

New strips: Birdman from Baratoga, Consternation Street, Ghost Ship, The Haunts of Headless Harry, The Kid Commandos, Monty Muddle – The Man from Mars, Nick and Nat – The Beat Boys, The Pillater Peril, Sam's Spook, The Thirteen Tasks of Simon Test, Threat of the Toymaker
Canceled strips: Cursitor Doom, King of the Ring, Rebbels on the Run, Send For... Q-Squad, Sergeant Rock — Special Air Service, The Touchline Tearaways, Tri-Man, Wiz War

1970 new adventure strips

The Thirteen Tasks of Simon Test by Angus Allan and Eric Bradbury
Simon Test undertakes a quest for immortality by attempting the thirteen tasks of the Pharaoh Thot, believing this to be the only way to save his life, having been deceived into believing he has only a few months to live. The sinister Jabez Coppenger secretly desires Test's death as a means of restoring his own youth. This serial introduces the mute servant Karka, who ultimately becomes Test's friend and assistant. Test then goes on to the more lengthy series of adventures entitled Simon Test and the Curse of the Conqueror, where he battles the twenty servants of the evil Ezekiel Spar, the self-styled Conqueror. This pits him against twenty athletes and champions, each of whom is under the hypnotic control of Spar, who implants in them an in-built impulse to kill Simon Test.

The Pillater Peril by Carlos Cruz González
David Pillater returns to Pillater House, his ancestral home on the Cornish coast, which he is to inherit on his 21st birthday. Along with his four cousins and his Uncle Bernard, David is imperiled by Francis Pillater, an ancestor who has seemingly returned from the dead. Francis has an evil reputation for his misdeeds in the 16th-century, but was thought to have perished in a shipwreck during a storm at sea. Blaming the family for his troubles, he sets out for revenge by kidnapping them one by one. The strip had only a short run, but when discontinued it, unusually, came to a natural conclusion, rather than merely wrapping-up many continuing plot threads unconvincingly in the final panel.

Birdman from Baratoga
A boy who grew up on a Pacific island, with only the company of birds, has learned from them the secret of flight. By the use of a feather cape, he is able to glide through the air like an albatross. When an English sailor is castaway on the island, called Baratoga, they escape together on a raft and set out on a series of adventures in the Pacific, beginning by hunting down the desperado who has stolen the man's pearl-fishing yacht, Enterprise. The story was perhaps loosely based on a humour strip which had run in Buster during 1968: Captain Swoop – He's Half Man, Half Bird, Half Wit.

The Kid Commandos by Tom Kerr [reprinted from Buster]
Three Cockney children are stranded in occupied France in World War II. The Sparrow children – Tommy, Jan and Podge – are on the run from the Germans each week, in a single-page strip set in 1940. The strip was originally published in Buster in 1965, where it was known as The Sparrows Go To War.

Threat of the Toymaker by Francisco Solano López [reprinted from Buster]
Criminal scientist Doctor Droll escapes from Garstone Prison with the aid of an army of remote-controlled mechanical toys he had constructed, along the way taking the Prison Governor's children, Pam and Peter Keen, as hostages. Hampered by the children at every turn, Droll finds himself on the run, pursued by the police wherever he goes. The idea of using radio-controlled toys in the strip was scarcely original, since it was a straight lift from the House of Dolmann, which was then running in Valiant, as well as from the General Jumbo strip in The Beano. It was originally published in Buster as The Toys of Doom in 1965–1968 and later reprinted in Buster in 1986 under the title The Terror Toys. The strip was also reprinted in Eagle under its original title.

Tyler the Tamer by Edmond Ripoll
The adventures of the greatest film stuntman in the world. Replaced The Pillater Peril.

1970 new humour strips

Sam's Spook by Leo Baxendale
Sam is a schoolboy with a ghostly pal called Spooky, who uses his powers to humorous effect on Sam's behalf. The strip mostly consists of Sam's school friends catching Spooky doing a bit of ghostly cheating, in order to help Sam win at sports or football, and Sam doing a lot of running away to avoid a bashing.

The Haunts of Headless Harry by Mike Brown
The amiable ghost of a 16th-century soldier who had been beheaded. Harry's head and body lead separate but related ghostly existences, with the body carrying the head around everywhere, and both of them able to talk. Harry's humorous adventures invariably involve misplacing his head; such as going to the cinema and, on leaving, calling at the cloakroom to collect it (as though it was a hat), and being asked by the attendant to identify it among all the other ghostly heads left there during the film.

Consternation Street by Reg Parlett (Note: Parlett was also known from his other humour strips in Buster, including Rent-A-Ghost Ltd, The Happy Family and Bonehead; as well as the long-running Billy Bunter strip in Valiant, which continued in Valiant and Smash.) [reprinted from Buster]
A collection of unlikely neighbours rub shoulders on a very small street. The Snobbs and the Ardupps, Colonel Curry and Caesar (his dog), Miss Primm and her pets, Cutprice the Grocer, and Roger the Lodger are watched over by the dim-witted Constable Clott. Usually a one-page strip, its title spoofs that of the popular British television soap opera Coronation Street. It was originally published in Buster in 1965.

Monty Muddle – The Man from Mars by Nadal/Rafart [reprinted from Buster]
The misadventures of spaceman Monty Muddle, who flies about in his small bubble-domed spacecraft trying to make friends with the Earth people. However, due to his misunderstanding of Earth customs, his every attempt at contact ends in disaster; each strip typically ends with the catchphrase "I'll try again next week!" This half-page strip was originally published in Buster in 1960–1962, under the title Milkiway – The Man from Mars.

Nick and Nat – The Beat Boys by Gordon Hogg [reprinted from Hurricane]
Two young lads from Liverpool who fancy themselves as musicians, speak in Liverpudlian slang (even the original title of the strip was derived from a slang Scouse term for a native of Liverpool: "wacker"), sport mop top haircuts, and always carry guitars. Spoofing The Beatles, a year after that group's demise, was an odd choice! The strip was originally published in Wham!, as The Wacks, in 1964. The strip had previously been reprinted in Fleetway's Hurricane, under the title Birk 'n' 'Ed, (Note: Spoken quickly for comic effect, the names of the two characters were intended to sound like that of a district in Liverpool called Birkenhead.) the Mersey Dead-Beats, from 30 January 1965.

The Fighting Three by Carlos Cruz González [reprinted from Buster]
The misadventures of three men, globe-trotters McGinty, Hambone, and Weasel, who are traveling the world, trying to raise enough money to start their own construction company, but who get into fights – and jail – wherever they go. The strip was originally published in Buster in 1964, under the title Mighty McGinty. Launched in the issue of 29th August 1970, it replaced Threat of the Toymaker.

Ghost Ship originally by Reg Parlett
The spirit of an ancient galleon, and the ghosts of its pirate crew, sail the Seven Seas making mischief, but usually coming off worst.

Moonie's Magic Mate by Carlos Cruz González
A schoolboy, Barry Moon, finds a genie in a dusty old bottle. This replaced The Kid Commandos.

=== January/February 1970 changes ===
Smash! endured yet another major shakeup in the first two months of 1970, when further changes of editorial policy were imposed by new owners Reed International, which had bought out IPC that year. In the aftermath of the changes made in August 1969, further changes made at the start of 1970 left Smash! looking very different from its appearance in the wake of the relaunch just 12 months earlier. A vast number of new strips were added, in what amounted to a second relaunch, such that only half of those introduced in March 1969 now survived, although those which continued included Master of the Marsh, Janus Stark, His Sporting Lordship, Battle of Britain, Eric the Viking, Wacker, The Handcuff Hotspurs, The Swots and the Blots, and Percy's Pets – the latter two now being the only remaining Odhams strips. Discontinued were King of the Ring (last survivor of the serious strips from the Odhams era), Sergeant Rock – Special Air Service, and Cursitor Doom. Three of the strips only recently introduced were also dropped, namely the wartime Q-Squad, British superhero Tri-Man, and the humour strip The Touchline Tearaways.

The first changes in 1970 occurred in the issue dated 24 January, when three new strips appeared, all reprints from Buster: The Kid Commandos, Consternation Street, and Monty Muddle – The Man from Mars (originally titled Milkiway – The Man from Mars). As had been done in the spring of 1969, by bringing in some of the changes a few weeks ahead of the relaunch, the publisher hoped to disguise the true extent of the changes.

The 7th February issue then saw a full relaunch: with more free gifts, another new cover feature — The Thirteen Tasks of Simon Test — and no less than eight new strips, making an astonishing eleven strips added since the beginning of the year. New supporting strips introduced in the 7th February issue included Threat of the Toymaker, The Pillater Peril, Birdman of Baratoga, Nick and Nat – The Beat Boys, and three humour strips with a common supernatural element: Sam's Spook (drawn by Leo Baxendale), The Haunts of Headless Harry, and Ghost Ship.

The 1970 relaunch also resulted in the dropping of the Warriors of the World cover feature. The Warriors of the World covers had run into a problem, in that war stories were no longer a strong element of Smash!, which had dropped the humour strip Nutt and Bolt the Men from W.H.E.E.Z.E. some time earlier. When it was decided to also drop Sergeant Rock – Paratrooper (by then renamed Sergeant Rock – Special Air Service), and Q-Squad, the cover feature had to go too. It was not practical to advertise war stories on the cover if there were no war stories inside. The newly added Kid Commandos did not count as a war story in this context, since the three fugitive children did not do any conventional fighting. The strip was more like a souped-up version of the discontinued Rebbels on the Run.

Accordingly, after forty-seven weeks (Note: 46 issues featuring the Warriors of the World cover feature, and one Christmas issue.) the Warriors of the World series was ended. Instead, the issue dated 7 February 1970 began The Thirteen Tasks of Simon Test, written by Angus Allan and drawn by the ever-popular Eric Bradbury. Henceforth until the merger with Valiant, each week's cover featured a full-page splash advertising the task that adventurer Simon Test would undertake in a new strip on the inside pages. This strip proved so successful that when the original thirteen-week series was completed (featuring one task each week), Simon Test was given a new series of adventures, extending his hold on the cover indefinitely (he had 47 covers in all). The Simon Test feature would prove particularly enduring, being one of the few strips to ultimately survive the merger with Valiant in 1971.

=== Summer 1970 changes ===
Further changes followed: fully thirteen strips had been introduced since the start of 1970. In the issue dated 27 June, a new humour strip began, Moonie's Magic Mate. In the issue dated 29 August, a humour strip titled The Fighting Three began (another reprint from Buster, where, under its original title Mighty McGinty, the strip had run in 1964). Finally, in the last addition before the comic's closure, Tyler the Tamer was launched in early 1971. A common supernatural theme linked the three new humour strips. Dropped to make room for these were Kid Commandos, Threat of the Toymaker and The Pillater Peril (the Pillater saga seemingly reaching a natural conclusion, instead of merely being summarily abandoned).

== Merger with Valiant ==
In mid-November 1970, production on Smash! (and many other IPC titles, including Valiant) came to a halt due to a printers' strike, and no editions were published for the next three months. By the time the strike was settled, in February of the following year, irreparable damage had been done to the comic's circulation, as its young readers had turned elsewhere in the intervening 11 weeks. Similar harm had been suffered by Valiant. In consequence of this latest financial disaster, after eight issues, in April 1971 the two titles were merged in an attempt to combine their surviving circulation. For a brief time the merged comic was entitled Valiant and Smash (10 April to 18 September 1971), before reverting to simply Valiant.

Some strips from Smash! survived in the new comic, including His Sporting Lordship, Janus Stark and The Swots and the Blots, but most were lost, although the Smash! Annual continued to appear for many years afterward (continuing, in fact, until the 1976 Annual, published in the autumn of 1975). A lot of the strips thereby continued to appear each year, including many which had not even survived into Valiant, long after Smash! had ceased publication as a comic.

The sports-themed His Sporting Lordship had enjoyed perhaps the greatest popularity, surviving the shake-ups of 1969 and 1970, and then surviving even the merger with Valiant, though it was to last only a few months in its new home, finally ending in December 1971. However, it was revived in the 1972 Smash! Annual, published at Christmas 1971, and returned year after year, becoming the regular cover feature of the Annuals.

The merged title was dominated by Valiant, which contributed nine strips consisting of twenty pages; whereas Smash! was represented by only four strips, totaling a meager nine pages: Janus Stark, The Swots & The Blots, Simon Test, and His Sporting Lordship.

Despite all of the changes, the new Smash! had lasted only two years. It was only marginally profitable, but no title could have survived such a lengthy loss of production. Its demise was directly attributable to the strike.

Smash! was the last attempt in the UK market to publish a general boys comic, mixing adventure, sports and humour strips. Subsequent comics would survive only by ruthlessly focusing on narrow, sectional interests: such as all-sports, all-war, or all-humour; (Note: The most successful of these was Doctor Who Weekly, which still exists today, although it had to become a monthly title in order to survive (and adopt a magazine format).) just as the American market had already specialised into all-funnies, all-horror, and all-superhero titles. The writing was on the wall for non-niche comics in the UK, for, in the face of the competition from television, even IPC's flagship, Valiant, ultimately could not survive. (Note: One trend in British comics was to ride the coat-tails of the success of television, which was gradually killing off comics, by specialising in strips based on popular TV shows: titles which attempted to ride the back of the tiger in this fashion included TV Comic, TV21, TV Tornado, Lady Penelope, Joe 90 Top Secret, Countdown/TV Action, and Doctor Who Weekly.)

== Smash! characters in Albion ==
Many of IPC's characters, including several from Smash!, were featured in the 2005–2006 limited series Albion, published by WildStorm (DC Comics). Those from Smash! included Bad Penny, Brian's Brain, The Cloak, Cursitor Doom, Grimly Feendish, Janus Stark, Rubberman, Tri-Man, and the cast of Queen of the Seas.

== 2023 revival and 2026 reprint ==
In October 2023 Smash! was revived for a three-issue mini-series by the Treasury of British Comics imprint of Rebellion Developments.

In 2026 The Legend Testers was collected in a trade paperback by Rebellion.

== Analysis ==
Part of the problem with Smash! was that it went through far too many changes in its early days, particularly in its adventure strips. The Ghost Patrol came and went; The Legend Testers came and went; Brian Lewis' Moon Madness was particularly short-lived; and there were numerous others, equally forgettable. None proved popular enough to last. Undeniably, none enjoyed the tremendous popularity of the American superhero strips which the comic would shortly feature, which genuinely had sufficient popularity to rival that of television. (Note: Marvel Comics as an independent UK publisher — Marvel UK — in the 1970s, demonstrated that their superhero comics were capable of strong sales even in the face of competition from the newest rival: colour television. Smash! might have survived into that 1970s era of colour TV if it could have managed to retain its popular superhero strips.)

Those readers old enough to have become emotionally attached to comics before Odhams introduced American superhero strips to British readers tended to dislike those superhero strips. Whereas, according to the letters pages each week, those same Marvel and DC heroes were enormously popular among the younger age group who had not been reading comics previously. Accordingly, Wham! readers tended to resent the changes made in 1966, because British strips were canceled in Wham! and replaced with U.S. superheroes, whereas Smash! readers did not resent the superheroes, because in 1966 that comic had only just launched, so there were no real changes – Smash! more or less teemed with American strips from the very beginning.

The decision in 1969 to discontinue the American superhero strips was the real cause of the comic's demise. Other problems would contribute to the difficulties it subsequently faced – including strikes at the company's printers – but the root cause of those problems was the falling circulation it suffered, which was a consequence of not having any unique elements to distinguish it from other IPC comics such as Lion and Valiant. The key to understanding the situation is that the superheroes were the only element that genuinely had the necessary popularity to halt the decline in weekly sales caused by the competition from television.

== Smash! cover features ==
Strip title	Issues on the cover	Total no. of covers	Notes
Batman with Robin the Boy Wonder	20–33, 35–113	93	
The Swots and the Blots	2–3, 114–162	50	
Warriors of the World	163–[209]	47	
Thirteen Tasks of Simon Test	[211]–[257]	47	
The Man from B.U.N.G.L.E.	4–12,13–14,16–18	14	Shared the cover with the Legend Testers on issue #12 and the Hulk on issue #16.
The Legend Testers	12,15	2	Shared the cover with The Man from B.U.N.G.L.E. on issue #12.
The Incredible Hulk	16, 34	2	Shared the cover with The Man from B.U.N.G.L.E. on issue #16.
Ronnie Rich	1	1	
Charlie's Choice	19	1	

== List of Smash! original comic strips ==
Strip title	Genre	Original creator(s)	Other notable creator(s)	Starting issue (date)	Ending issue (date)	Notes
The Swots and the Blots	Humour	Leo Baxendale	Mike Lacey, Ron Spencer	1 (5 Feb. 1966)	[257] (3 Apr. 1971)	Continued in Valiant and Smash (and then Valiant and TV21).
Percy's Pets	Humour	Mac (Stanley McMurtry)	Cyril Brown	1 (5 Feb. 1966)	[222] (2 May 1970)	Often a half-page feature. Appeared in the 1970 Smash! annual, and then Whizzer and Chips.
Bad Penny	Humour	Leo Baxendale	Mike Brown	1 (5 Feb. 1966)	[164] 22 Mar. 1969	Penny herself later reappears as a character in Baxendale's The Swots and the Blots.
The Man From B.U.N.G.L.E.	Humour	Leo Baxendale	Mike Lacey, Ron Spencer	1 (5 Feb. 1966)	162 (8 March 1969)	
Grimly Feendish	Humour	Leo Baxendale	Mike Brown	1 (5 Feb. 1966)	162 (8 Mar. 1969)	
The Nervs	Humour	Graham Allen	Ken Reid	1 (5 Feb. 1966)	162 (8 Mar. 1969)	Drawn by Reid in its final months, spanning 1968–1969.
Ronnie Rich	Humour	Gordon Hogg		1 (5 Feb. 1966)	136 (7 Sept. 1968)	
Brian's Brain	Adventure	Bert Vandeput	Barrie Mitchell	1 (5 Feb. 1966); 93 (11 Nov. 1967)	15 (16 May 1966); 162 (8 Mar 1969)	Canceled in early 1966 and brought back in late 1967.
Queen of the Seas	Humour	Ken Reid		1 (5 Feb. 1966)	43 (26 Nov. 1966)	
The Tellybugs	Humour	Walter Thorburn and George Parlett	Cyril Price	1 (5 Feb. 1966)	20 (18 June 1966)	
Space Jinx	Humour	Brian Lewis		1 (5 Feb. 1966)	15 (16 May 1966)	Replaced by The Incredible Hulk reprints.
Danger Mouse	Humour			3 (19 Feb. 1966)	c. 76 (15 July 1967)	
The Legend Testers	Adventure	Graham Baker (writer) and Jordi Bernet (artist)		9 (2 April 1966)	75 (8 July 1967)	A half-page promotional advertisement appeared in issue 8 (26 March 1966). Two further stories were published in the Smash! Annual 1970. In 2026, Rebellion published a collected edition reprinting the complete Smash! run, excluding the two strips from the 1970 Annual. The story arcs comprised: Death Castle: issues 9–21 (2 April – 25 June 1966); Eterno: issues 22–29 (2 July – 20 August 1966); The Crown of Zeus: issues 30–47 (27 August – 24 December 1966); The Legend Testers and the Crystal Orb of Merlin: issues 48–57 (31 December 1966 – 4 March 1967); The King of the Beasts: issues 58–63 (11 March – 15 April 1967); The Metal Men: issues 64–70 (22 April – 3 June 1967); The Crown of Kebi: issues 71–75 (10 June – 8 July 1967); Captain Blackheart: Smash! Annual 1970; Who Killed the Black Baron?: Smash! Annual 1970
Moon Madness	Adventure	Alf Wallace and Brian Lewis		9 (2 Apr. 1966)	15 (16 May 1966)	Source:
The Rubber Man	Adventure	Ken Mennell and Alfredo Marculeta		c. 19 (11 June 1966)	c. 1968	Occasionally crossed over with the Don Starr feature in Terrific.
Charlie's Choice	Humour	Brian Lewis		19 (11 June 1966)	136 (7 Sept. 1968)	
Tuffy McGrew	Humour	Graham Allen		c. 29 (20 Aug. 1966)	c. 104 (27 Jan. 1968)	Also appeared in the 1970 Smash! annual.
Wiz War	Humour	Mike Brown	Leo Baxendale	137 (14 Sept. 1968)	[208] (24 Jan. 1970)	Originated in Pow!; one of a handful of strips to survive the changes of 1969.
The Cloak	Humour	Mike Higgs		137 (14 Sept. 1968)	162 (8 Mar. 1969)	Originated in Pow!
King of the Ring	Sports adventure			144 (2 Nov. 1968)	[208] (24 Jan. 1970)	
Laird of the Apes	Adventure			144 (2 Nov. 1968)	c. 162 (8 Mar. 1969)	
At Night Stalks... The Spectre	Adventure			144 (2 Nov. 1968)	162 (8 Mar. 1969)	
Destination Danger	Adventure			144 (2 Nov. 1968)	c. 162 (8 Mar. 1969)	
Bunsen's Burner	Adventure			158 (8 Feb. 1969)	c. [186] (23 Aug. 1969)	
Janus Stark	Adventure	Tom Tully and Francisco Solano López		[163] (15 Mar. 1969)	[257] (3 Apr. 1971)	Continues in Valiant.
Master of the Marsh	Sports, Humour	Tom Tully and Francisco Solano López		[163] (15 Mar. 1969)	[257] (3 Apr. 1971)	
His Sporting Lordship	Sports, Humour	Douglas Maxted		[163] (15 Mar. 1969)	[257] (3 Apr. 1971)	Continued on into Valiant and Smash and then Valiant and TV21.
Cursitor Doom	Adventure	Geoff Campion	Eric Bradbury	[163] (15 Mar. 1969)	[210] (7 Feb. 1970)	
Rebbels on the Run	Adventure, Science fiction	John Stokes		[163] (15 Mar. 1969)	[205] (30 Jan. 1970)	Renamed The Rebbel Robot after a few months.
The World-Wide Wanderers	Sports, Humour			[163] (15 Mar. 1969)	[185] (16 Aug. 1969)	
Nutt and Bolt the Men From W.H.E.E.Z.E.	Humour			[163] (15 Mar. 1969)	[185] (16 Aug. 1969)	
The Handcuff Hotspurs	Sports	Edmond Ripoll		[186] (23 Aug. 1969)	[257] (3 Apr. 1971)	Replaced the football strip World Wide Wanderers.
The Touchline Tearaways	Sports	Mike Lacey		[186] (23 Aug. 1969)	[205] (30 Jan. 1970)	
Tri-Man	Superhero		Ron Turner	[189] (13 Sept. 1969)	[205] (30 Jan. 1970)	Turner did the art in the Smash! annual.
The Thirteen Tasks of Simon Test	Adventure	Angus Allan and Eric Bradbury		[209] (7 Feb. 1970)	[257] (3 Apr. 1971)	Continued in Valiant and Smash.
Birdman from Baratoga	Adventure			[209] (7 Feb. 1970)	[257] (3 Apr. 1971)	
Sam's Spook	Humour	Leo Baxendale		[209] (7 Feb. 1970)	[257] (3 Apr. 1971)	
The Haunts of Headless Harry	Humour	Mike Brown	Mike Lacey	[209] (7 Feb. 1970)	[257] (3 Apr. 1971)	
Ghost Ship	Humour	Reg Parlett		[209] (7 Feb. 1970)	[257] (3 Apr. 1971)	
The Pillater Peril	Adventure	Carlos Cruz González		[209] (7 Feb. 1970)	[250] (14 Nov. 1970)	
Moonie's Magic Mate	Humour	Carlos Cruz González		[230] (27 June 1970)	[257] (3 Apr. 1971)	Replaced Kid Commandos.
Tyler the Tamer	Adventure	Edmond Ripoll		[251] (15 Feb. 1971)	[257] (3 Apr. 1971)	Replaced The Pillater Peril.

== List of Smash! reprint comic strips ==
Strip title	Genre	Original creator(s)	Other notable creator(s)	Starting issue (date)	Ending issue (date)	Original publisher	Original title	Original dates	Notes
The Ghost Patrol	Adventure/War/Science fiction	Gerry Embleton		1 (5 Feb. 1966)	26 (30 July 1966)	Swift	Phantom Patrol	1962	
The Incredible Hulk	Superhero	Stan Lee and Jack Kirby		16 (21 May 1966)	82 (26 Aug. 1967)	Marvel Comics		1962–1967	Led to the cancellation of Space Jinx and Brian's Brain.
Batman with Robin the Boy Wonder	Superhero	Whitney Ellsworth and Al Plastino		20 (18 June 1966)	157 (1 Feb. 1969)	Batman comic strip			Credited to (but not written by) Batman creator Bob Kane. Led to the cancellation of The Ghost Patrol and The Tellybugs.
Daredevil	Superhero	Stan Lee and Bill Everett	Wally Wood, Gene Colan	76 (15 July 1967)	143 (26 Oct. 1968)	Marvel Comics			Replaced Hulk reprints when those ran out.
Fantastic Four	Superhero	Stan Lee and Jack Kirby		137 (14 Sept. 1968)	162 (8 Mar. 1969)	Marvel Comics	Storylines: The wedding of Reed and Sue (from Fantastic Four Annual #3), then from "Defeated by the Frightful Four" to "Lo, There Shall Be An Ending".	1965	Added to Smash! as a result of absorbing Pow! (which had previously merged with Wham!, in which the strip had initially featured). Final Marvel strip to appear in Smash!.
Spider-Man	Superhero	Stan Lee and Steve Ditko		137 (14 Sept. 1968)	143 (26 Oct. 1968)	Marvel Comics	Storylines: from Thrill of the Hunt (Kraven the Hunter) to The Molten Man Regrets.		Added to Smash! as a result of absorbing Pow!.
The Mighy Thor	Superhero	Stan Lee and Jack Kirby		144 (2 Nov. 1968)	162 (8 March 1969)	Marvel Comics	Storyline: From "The Growing Man" through "The Ringmaster's Circus of Crime" to "When Falls A Hero".		Added as a result of Smash! and Pow! absorbing Fantastic. The final published story had a new ending substituted, in a rushed attempt to resolve a continuing sub-plot.
Sergeant Rock — Paratrooper	War adventure	John Vernon	Carlos Cruz González	156 (25 Jan. 1969)	[208] (24 Jan. 1970)	Hurricane and Tiger (Fleetway)		1964–1965	Later renamed Sergeant Rock — Special Air Service.
Big 'Ead	Humour	Angel Nadal		[163] (15 Mar. 1969)	[257] (3 Apr. 1971)	Buster		1960–1961	Half-page strip
Wacker	Humour	Raf and Roy Wilson (alternatingly)		[163] (15 Mar. 1969)	c. [257] (3 Apr. 1971)	Buster	Elmer	1960–1964	
The Battle of Britain	Adventure	Geoff Campion	John Stokes	[163] (15 Mar. 1969)	[257] (3 April 1971)	Lion	Britain in Chains; The Battle for Britain	1964–1966	Smash! ceased publication, in April 1971, before it had reprinted the entire run from Lion, and in the final issue created a new ending for the serial.
Eric the Viking	Adventure	Ken Bulmer and Don Lawrence		[163] (15 Mar. 1969)	c. [257] (3 April 1971)	Lion	Karl the Viking	1960–1964	Previously reprinted in Lion between 1 October 1966 – 7 October 1967; it would later be reprinted again, in the European version of Vulcan.
Send For... Q-Squad	Adventure	Eric Bradbury	Luis Bermejo Rojo, Fred Holmes	[185] (16 Aug. 1969)	[205] (30 Jan. 1970)	Buster	Phantom Force 5	1960–1964	Replaced Nutt and Bolt the Men From W.H.E.E.Z.E.
The Kid Commandos	War adventure	Tom Kerr		[204] (24 Jan. 1970)	[229] (20 June 1970)	Buster	The Sparrows Go To War	1965	
Consternation Street	Humour	Reg Parlett		[204] (24 Jan. 1970)	c. 1971	Buster		1965	
Monty Muddle – The Man from Mars	Humour	Nadal/Rafart		[204] (24 Jan. 1970)	[257] (3 April 1971)	Buster	Milkiway – The Man from Mars	1960–1962	Half-page strip
Threat of the Toymaker	Adventure	Francisco Solano López		[210] (7 Feb. 1970)	[238] (22 Aug. 1970)	Buster	The Toys of Doom	1965–1968; 1986	Later reprinted in Buster under the title The Terror Toys. Also reprinted in Eagle under its original title.
Nick and Nat – The Beat Boys	Humour	Gordon Hogg		[210] (7 Feb. 1970)	[257] (3 April 1971)	Wham!	The Wacks	1964	Previously reprinted in Fleetway's Hurricane, under the title Birk 'n' 'Ed.
The Fighting Three	Humour	Carlos Cruz González		[239] (29 Aug. 1970)	[257] (3 April 1971)	Buster	Mighty McGinty	1964	Replaced Threat of the Toymaker.
