= Wham! (comics) =

Former British comics magazine

- Wham! #1 (20 June 1964), featuring Biff and the Tiddlers. Artwork by Leo Baxendale.

Publication information
- Publisher: Odhams Press
- Schedule: weekly (every Tuesday)
- Format: Ongoing series
- Genre: Humor/comedySuperhero
- Publication date: 20 June 1964 – 13 January 1968 (merged into Pow!)
- No. of issues: 187
- Main character(s): Eagle Eye, Junior Spy; Fantastic Four; Georgie's Germs; Grimly Feendish; Kelpie the Boy Wizard; Pest of the West; Sammy Shrink; The Tiddlers; The Wacks

Creative team
- Written by: Sandy Hobbs, Lois Hobbs, Stan Lee (reprints)
- Artist(s): Leo Baxendale, John M. Burns, Jack Kirby (reprints), Gordon Hogg, Brian Lewis, Dave Jenner, Ken Reid
- Editor(s): Alf Wallace

Wham! was a weekly British comics magazine published by Odhams Press. It ran for 187 issues from 20 June 1964 to 13 January 1968, when it merged into its sister title Pow!

Created by veteran cartoonist Leo Baxendale, Wham! was structured like a typical British comic in the mould of The Beano, but it was distinguished by "a racy and anarchic new breed" of humour that inspired later British strips. The initial success of Wham! prompted the creation of sister titles Smash! and Pow! with similar intent; these, in turn, led to the formation of Odhams' Power Comics line, featuring reprints of American Marvel Comics superhero stories. Wham! included short instalments of The Fantastic Four.

== Overview ==
Odhams' line of "juveniles" (i.e., comics) were managed by Alf Wallace, who had been brought over from Fleetway Publications (formerly Amalgamated Press), both parts of the same Mirror Group. Odhams competed for readers with DC Thomson, publisher of such popular titles as The Beano, The Dandy, and Commando. Wallace had been successful at Fleetway with his line of War Picture Library comics, but had been unable to reverse the declining popularity of Odhams' other comics titles, including Eagle, Swift, and Boys' World. Odhams had acquired Eagle and Swift from Hulton Press in 1960, and by early 1964, Eagle was the only one left, having absorbed Swift and Boy's World.

In 1964, Wallace recruited humour cartoonist Leo Baxendale, who had worked for DC Thomson for many years, to create a new, energetic comics weekly. Although Baxendale was paid £8,000 in his first year at Odhams (adjusted for inflation, £140,000 in 2021 terms), he soon realized that there was little other security or money to pay contributors like John M. Burns, Gordon Hogg, Brian Lewis, and Dave Jenner (as Fleetway fought with Odhams for more resources from the parent Mirror Group).

Wham! debuted on 20 June 1964; in its early issues it featured both clear imitations of The Beano strips — such as a clone of his Bash Street Kids in the shape of The Tiddlers — and new original strips — such as Eagle Eye, Junior Spy and Georgie's Germs, in which Baxendale attempted to break the mould of older strips by the use of bizarre humour, outrageous puns, and surreal plots. Of Wham!'s initial lineup of strips, Baxendale created at least seven of them (including Danny Dare; Eagle Eye, Junior Spy; Footsie the Clown; General Nitt and his Barmy Army; Georgie's Germs; Pest of the West; and The Tiddlers). Long before the Fantastic Four joined the lineup, John M. Burns' Kelpie the Boy Wizard was the rare adventure strip in Wham!, set in the days of Camelot and King Arthur.

With the success of Wham!, the next title in the line, Smash!, debuted on 5 February 1966. The Hulk became the first Marvel superhero to show up in an Odhams title when he debuted in Smash! #16 (21 May 1966). The popularity of that strip led to Wham! adding Fantastic Four reprints beginning with issue #112 (6 August 1966). In late 1966, with two Odhams' titles featuring superheroes (and the third, Pow!, on the way), the Power Comics line was named, and the Power Comics logo was installed on the covers of Wham! and Smash! starting in early December 1966.

As costs rose, however, the inevitable adjustment of content made Wham! more like those comics it had been attempting to replace. In January 1968, Wham! merged with Pow! to become Pow! and Wham!; that title soon enough merged into Smash! The Power Comics line itself disappeared in late 1968 (although Smash! continued), and, beginning 1 January 1969, IPC Magazines (another member of the Mirror Group) took over publication of the remaining Odhams titles.

== Background ==
=== Anarchic comedy ===
Under Leo's guidance Wham! had created a newer, faster trend that was to influence many new up-and-coming artists and editors to imitate Baxendale's style in later years. Although by 1966 Wham! turned out not to be the commercial success it was originally intended, the trend Leo had created in terms of a racy and anarchic "new breed" of comic nevertheless seemed to be gaining greater favour amongst the hierarchy at Odhams. In fact, it could even be said to be veering out of control from Baxendale's original conception.

=== Pressure to succeed ===
In 1964 Leo Baxendale's brain-child, Wham!, appeared on the newsstands. Wham!'s success would be the foundation for the launch of a sister comic, yet there were problems even from the start. The line of comics managed by Alf Wallace (Managing Editor of Odhams' juveniles) — Eagle, Swift and Boys' World — were steadily declining in circulation. This meant that Odhams were not able to attack DC Thomson from a secure base of rock-steady titles. The other crucial factor was time, and, Alf having a jittery board of directors behind him, meant that he was under pressure for success. According to Leo: "Alf had moved from Fleetway to Odhams as the 'golden boy' on the strength of his success as an editor of the 'War Libraries'". By the time Leo started Wham!, "Alf's position at Odhams had already been weakened by his inability to save the existing Odhams comics from spectacular declines in circulation. The fact that probably, given the demographic changes, no one else could have stopped their decline is neither here nor there in the policies of commercial publishing".

=== Rivalry with Fleetway ===
Odhams' comics were not only trying to attack DC Thomson; they were also in rivalry with Fleetway — despite the fact that Odhams and Fleetway (formerly Associated Press) were parts of the same Mirror Group: "Alf Wallace once made a cry aside to me to illustrate the hostility between Fleetway and Odhams: 'If I were to go across to the Fleetway canteen to have lunch, they would soon order me out'".

=== Scant resources ===
There were two other major factors which struck Leo as soon as he started creating Wham!: "One was that the long-term commitment on the boards of DC Thomson and Fleetway could not be taken for granted with the Odhams board. From an early stage, I realised that there was a power struggle going on within the Mirror Group. Being an outsider I only caught glimpses of the struggle, and only belatedly realised its extent. The second feature of Odhams' juveniles that struck me at the beginning was that although they were part of a large group, the comics section did not have the resources of the DC Thomson comics organisation".

Leo earned £8,000 in his first year at Odhams (allowing for inflation, that's around £140,000 in 2021 terms), and although it was all very well to give that kind of money to an artist who they wanted, there was no similar commitment of resources by Odhams towards a long-term trend in the comics market. Although these were factors which hindered Wham!'s launch, Odhams published the first issue in June 1964.

== Strips ==
- Biff
- Billy Binns and his Wonderful Specs by Bill Mainwaring
- Danny Dare by Leo Baxendale, later by different artists
- Eagle Eye, Junior Spy by Leo Baxendale — Grimly Feendish, Eagle Eye's arch-nemesis, graduated to his own comic strip in Smash! in 1966, along with his travelling accomplices (including bats, spiders, octopuses and other creatures of darkness and slime) who assisted Feendish in his schemes of world domination
- Fantastic Four reprints by Stan Lee and Jack Kirby — begins with issue #112
- Footsie the Clown originally by Leo Baxendale, later by different artists including Graham Allen
- Frankie Stein by Ken Reid (1964–1968) — Goofy, harmless Frankie (a take on Frankenstein's monster) lives with his mad scientist father, Professor Cube, at Mildew Manor. Frankie doesn't know his own strength and constantly ends up breaking everything. The Professor, meanwhile, is always scheming — and failing — to rid himself of Frankie. Strip later revived in 1973 in Shiver and Shake, and then Whoopee!, and then Frankie became "editor" of Monster Fun.
- General Nitt and his Barmy Army by Leo Baxendale
- Georgie's Germs by Leo Baxendale
- The Humbugs
- Kelpie the Boy Wizard by John M. Burns — fantasy adventure strip, set in the days of King Arthur
- Pest of the West originally by Leo Baxendale; later by Brian Lewis and Stanley McMurtry
- Sammy Shrink: The Smallest Boy in the World by Dave Jenner — about a boy who is only two inches tall. Sammy had the most successful — but also the most chequered — career of all the Odhams humour characters, originating in Wham!, moving to Pow! when they merged, and subsequently revived in Knockout, finally ending his career in Whizzer and Chips when it absorbed Knockout in June 1973.
- The Tiddlers — the Kids from Canal Road School originally by Leo Baxendale; later by Mike Lacey
- The Wacks by Gordon Hogg — about two young lads from Liverpool who fancy themselves as musicians, speak in Liverpudlian slang (even the original title of the strip was derived from a slang Scouse term for a native of Liverpool: "wacker"), sport mop top haircuts, and always carry guitars. Reprinted in Fleetway's Hurricane, under the title Birk 'n' 'Ed; (Note: Spoken quickly for comic effect, the names of the two characters were intended to sound like that of a district in Liverpool called Birkenhead.) the Mersey Dead-Beats, from 30 January 1965. Reprinted again in Smash! in 1970 as Nick and Nat – The Beat Boys.
