= Fantastic (comics) =

- Cover of the Fantastic Summer Special 1968.

Publication information
- Publisher: Odhams Press' Power Comics
- Schedule: Weekly
- Format: Ongoing series
- Genre: Superhero
- Publication date: 18 February 1967 – 26 October 1968 (merged into Smash!)
- No. of issues: 89
- Main character(s): The Mighty Thor; X-Men; Iron Man; The Avengers; Doctor Strange; Missing Link/Johnny Future

Creative team
- Written by: Stan Lee (reprints)
- Artist(s): Luis Bermejo, Barry Windsor-Smith, Jack Kirby (reprints), Steve Ditko (reprints)

Fantastic was a weekly British comic book magazine published by Odhams Press under the Power Comics imprint. It first appeared on 18 February 1967, and with its 52nd issue on 10 February 1968 it merged with its sister title Terrific. The 89th and final issue of Fantastic appeared on 26 October 1968, after which it was merged into its sister title Smash!.

Fantastic was different from the earlier Power Comics such as Smash! and Pow!, which were essentially traditional Beano-style British comic papers supplemented by a small amount of material reprinted from Marvel Comics. In contrast, Fantastic (and later Terrific as well) were more American in appearance, resembling the black-and-white comic anthologies of the time such as Creepy and Eerie. They were aimed at a younger audience than such magazines, however, although an older audience than the Beano-style British fare. Fantastic could not sustain a profit in the increasingly crowded market of 1960s comics, but it did gain a faithful following, and served as an introduction for UK readers to many of Marvel's superhero characters.

== Publication history ==
=== Launch ===
Following the successes of Wham! (1964) and Smash! (1966), Odhams were keen to expand their line of weekly Power Comics titles in 1967. In January they launched Pow! with Spider-Man as the lead strip, and a month later saw the arrival of a comic that consisted almost entirely of Marvel reprints: Fantastic.

Fantastic #1, which launched on Saturday 11 February 1967, came with a pennant flag with interchangeable inserts of various superheroes. This the first of several free gifts given away with each issue, as was traditional on the launch of a new comic. Fantastic had a different format from its three predecessors, being slightly smaller in size and on better paper; it featured 40 pages and a higher cover price (9d, compared to Smash!'s 7d for 28 pages). This made it three times more expensive than the 3d cover price of DC Thomson's perennials The Beano and The Dandy.

All the Marvel strips inside Fantastic were printed in black-and-white, with colour used only for the front and back covers. The first issue commenced with Thor's origin story from Journey into Mystery #83 ("The Stone Men from Saturn"), plus the first X-Men story (the arrival of Jean Grey) from the original X-Men #1, and the origin of Iron Man ("Iron Man is Born") from Tales of Suspense.

=== Merger with Terrific ===
Advertisement for Fantastic from the 1968 Fantastic Summer Special.

Issue #52 of Fantastic saw the comic re-launched, in effect, as it absorbed companion paper Terrific to form Fantastic and Terrific, featuring Thor and the X-Men (from Fantastic), plus the Avengers and Doctor Strange (from Terrific).

That issue again saw the first of several free gifts given away with each issue. The cover numbering was continued from Fantastic.

=== Closure ===
The merger of the two titles bought Fantastic another nine months of life, but ultimately this was not enough to save it. Issue #89, published in late October 1968, was the final issue. The Thor strip was thereafter transferred to Smash!, and the others were discontinued.

== Style and content ==
To match its more American appearance and format, the contents of Fantastic were also predominantly American, starting in the first issue with reprints of Marvel's The Mighty Thor and the X-Men, as well as Iron Man stories from Tales of Suspense.

Fantastic's first 15 issues also featured original stories of a British superhero known as The Missing Link, a prehistoric character closely based on the appearance of the Incredible Hulk (risking a lawsuit by Marvel for copyright infringement) — Hulk reprints having been the first Marvel superhero strips to show up in Odhams' Power Comics titles, and remaining hugely successful in Smash!). By issue #16, the Missing Link had evolved (literally) into a superman of the future, now called Johnny Future. The Johnny Future stories were drawn by Luis Bermejo.

This line-up continued until issue #51, when Fantastic absorbed Terrific: becoming Fantastic and Terrific, but continuing the sequential numbering from Fantastic. The Thor and X-Men features continued until the end of the comic's run (when Thor then continued in Smash!), but Iron Man and Johnny Future were replaced by reprints of The Avengers and Doctor Strange, both continuing from Terrific.

A distinctive feature of Fantastic was the full-colour pin-up that appeared on the back cover of most issues. Many of these were reprinted from American Marvel comics, but at least some (including a Johnny Future pin-up) were produced by a young Barry Windsor-Smith.

=== "Britification" ===
The Marvel material in the Power Comics titles were frequently edited to replace American spellings and slang with their British equivalents. Dialogue and/or images were also changed occasionally to remove snags in continuity caused by the lack of synchronisation between reprints of different storylines. The alterations were quite crudely done and easy to spot.

Despite the amount of Marvel Comics material in the title, there was a relative lack of credit given to Marvel and the individual American creators of the material used. Marvel credit boxes containing the names of Stan Lee, Steve Ditko, Jack Kirby, and the like were invariably deleted from the splash pages; the space they occupied was either left blank or covered with drawn-in artwork. Apart from the compulsory copyright acknowledgment in small print, the name "Marvel" was never mentioned — wherever it appeared in the strips it was changed to "Power".
