= Grimly Feendish =

1960s British comic book character

- Author: Leo Baxendale
- Current status/schedule: Cancelled
- Launch date: 11 July 1964
- End date: 21 September 1974
- Publisher(s): Odhams Press; IPC Magazines; DC Comics
- Genre: Humour
- Preceded by: Eagle-Eye, Junior Spy

Grimly Feendish (alias The Rottenest Crook in the World) is a British comic book character created by Leo Baxendale in 1964, who originated in Baxendale's comic strip Eagle-Eye, Junior Spy, published in the magazine Wham! He is Eagle-Eye's nemesis and functions as a creepy but amusing comic book villain. The character became so popular that between 1966 and 1969 he had his own eponymous spin-off strip in Smash!

== Publication history ==
Grimly's first appearance was in Wham! #4 (11 July 1964, Odhams Press). His goal is world domination, which he attempts to achieve using various monsters and outrageous plot devices such as exploding treacle.

After appearing in Smash! from 1966 to 1969, he reappeared in 1973 in Shiver and Shake, as a member of the so-called Shiver Givers. The first eleven issues of Shiver and Shake reprinted stories from Smash! but then new adventures began, lasting until issue #77 (21 September 1974).

The character was revived in 2005 for Alan Moore's six-issue limited series, Albion, where his full name was revealed to be "Grymleigh Gartside Fiendstien".

=== Rebellion revival ===
In 2021, Rebellion Publishing announced that they would be reviving Monster Fun, and that Grimly Feendish would be included in the new issues.

A Monster Fun Halloween Special issue ("Halloween Spooktacular") was published in October 2021, and a new Grimly Feendish story ("Funstation", with script by Ned Hartley and art by Tom Paterson) was included.

== Cultural references ==
He was the inspiration for the song "Grimly Fiendish," by punk rock band The Damned.
