= Power Comics =

Comics imprint of Odhams Press

- The Power Comics logo
- Parent company: Odhams Press
- Founded: December 1966; 59 years ago
- Defunct: November 1968; 57 years ago
- Country of origin: United Kingdom
- Headquarters location: 64 Long Acre, London
- Key people: Alf Wallace, Bob Bartholomew, Albert Cosser
- Publication types: Comics
- Fiction genres: Superheroes, humor, science fiction, adventure
- Imprints: Wham! Smash! Pow! Fantastic; Terrific
- Owner: IPC Magazines

Power Comics was an imprint of the British comics publisher Odhams Press (itself a division of IPC Magazines) that was particularly notable for its use of material reprinted from American Marvel Comics. Appearing chiefly during the years 1967 and 1968, the Power Comics line consisted of five weekly titles: Wham!, Smash!, Pow!, Fantastic and Terrific. The first three of these titles were essentially traditional The Beano-style British comics papers, supplemented by a small amount of Marvel and DC Comics material, while Fantastic and Terrific were more magazine-like in style and were dominated by their Marvel superhero content.

== History ==
The Power Comics imprint was part of Odhams, headquartered at 64 Long Acre, London. Odhams was owned by International Publishing Corporation, a company formed in 1963 by Cecil Harmsworth King, chairman of the Daily Mirror and Sunday Pictorial (now the Sunday Mirror), through a series of corporate mergers. All of the comics published by IPC were under the control of one or other of the subsidiary companies which King had brought together to form IPC, including Fleetway Publications and Odhams Press.

The Power Comics imprint was led by a three-man editorial team, known as Alf, Bart, and Cos. Alfred Wallace ("Alf") was the Managing Editor at Odhams, and supervised the entire Power Comics line. Under his direction, Bart (a pen-name for Eagle's Bob Bartholemew) and Cos (Albert Cosser) were the staff editors who handled the individual titles.

Following the initial success of Wham! in 1964, Odhams had launched four more Power Comics during 1966 and 1967, only to close them in quick succession. Whereas 1968 began with all five Power Comics titles apparently flourishing, by the year's end only Smash! was still being published, the otrhers having been merged into it one by one. Readers had to notice that something was wrong, as the series of mergers resulted in ever more ludicrous titles, culminating in Smash! and Pow! Incorporating Fantastic (commonly spoofed as Smash, Pow, Wham, Incorporating Fantastic and Terrific).

=== Origins: Wham! and Smash! ===
When Odhams obtained the rights to reprint Marvel Comics material in the UK, they began by incorporating superhero stories such as the Hulk and the Fantastic Four into their existing titles Smash! and Wham! respectively. The Marvel material was reproduced in black-and-white and serialised in short installments alongside the original British strips which still dominated the content of those comics. Smash! also reprinted the Batman newspaper strip, to cash in on the popularity of the live-action TV show.

The Power Comics logo first appeared on Smash! #44, with a publication date of 3 December 1966.

=== Pow!, Fantastic, and Terrific ===
Power Comics took more concrete form with the appearance of Pow! and Fantastic early in 1967. The first issue of Pow! appeared on 14 January 1967, by which time Wham! had reached issue #136 and Smash! was at issue #51. Pow! was similar in format to the two earlier comics, a mixture of traditional British material and Marvel reprints — in this case Spider-Man and Nick Fury.

Fantastic first appeared on 11 February 1967, and was quite different in style from its predecessors. In many ways, it looked more like one of the American black-and-white anthology magazines of the time, such as Creepy and Eerie, than a traditional British comic such as The Beano. It was aimed at an older audience than the latter, though a younger one than the American anthology magazines. The content of Fantastic was dominated by the Marvel Comics superheroes Thor, the X-Men, and Iron Man, with only a minimal amount of British material. In general appearance, style, and content, Fantastic can be considered a direct precursor of the Marvel UK weeklies such as The Mighty World of Marvel that first appeared a few years later in 1972.

The number of Power Comics titles was increased to five on 8 April 1967 with the first appearance of Terrific, which was similar in format to Fantastic and was again dominated by Marvel reprint material: The Avengers, Doctor Strange, and the Sub-Mariner.

=== Mergers and the end of Power Comics ===
The Power Comics line remained at five titles for nine months, after which it started to dwindle. Wham! was merged into Pow! on 13 January 1968, while Terrific merged into Fantastic three weeks later. This left three Power titles for just over six months, after which Pow! and Fantastic were merged into Smash! in September and November 1968 respectively.

Odhams' parent, IPC Magazines, was eager to shed the licensing fee expenses for their American reprints, so as each title in the Power Comics line shut down, its respective superhero strips were given up. Only in the case of Fantastic, where the existing contract with Marvel had some months to run, were those strips transferred to its replacement, the merged Smash! and Pow! Incorporating Fantastic.

Despite being the longest survivor, and inheriting many popular strips from the other four titles, Smash! was only a limited success. The Power Comics line officially came to an end in November 1968, when the logo was dropped from Smash! and Pow!'s #143 cover.

Smash! continued to include some Marvel material but, once the Marvel contract expired in March 1969 (and having already dropped Batman), IPC quickly made extensive changes to the title, firing Alf Wallace (Note: Alf Wallace, now out of a job with Odhams, quickly joined the comics packager Martspress, started by a former colleague at Fleetway, Leonard Matthews. Martspress took on the production of the 1969 relaunch of City Magazines' TV21; that title, which also ended up being acquired by IPC, ended up using Marvel Comics reprint material in 1970–1971.) and ending many other strips as well. By introducing a new cover feature, new strips, and free gifts (in the style of established IPC titles such as Lion and Valiant), Smash! was revamped in all but name into a new comic.

Despite more editorial shakeups, Smash!, the last surviving member of the Power Comics line, lasted until April 1971, when it was merged into IPC's Valiant.

== Style and content ==
Power Comics was the first attempt to integrate elements of American superhero comics into mainstream British comic publishing, motivated by the huge success of Stan Lee's line of Marvel Comics in the USA. In addition to reprints of many of Marvel's most popular series, such as Spider-Man and the X-Men (all written by Lee), there was also an attempt to create a home-grown British superhero: firstly with the Missing Link/Johnny Future, who appeared in Fantastic prior to its merger with Terrific, and subsequently with Tri-Man, who appeared in Smash! after its merger with Fantastic.

=== Superheroes ===
The first superhero strip to appear in a (future) Power Comic title was the Incredible Hulk, who showed up in Smash! #16 (dated 21 May 1966). The Hulk's initial appearance took up a massive six pages, one-quarter of the 24-page issue, pushing five existing strips out of that issue (and causing the cancellation of two of them).

A month after the Hulk's debut, DC's Batman became the second American superhero to debut in Smash!, in issue #20 (18 June 1966), in re-edited reprints from American daily and Sunday newspaper strips. This was a response to the sudden and enormous popularity of the Batman television series starring Adam West.

The success of the Hulk then led to the introduction of the Fantastic Four into Wham! on 6 August 1966. The Fantastic Four eventually became the longest running Marvel strip, ultimately appearing in three Power Comics titles in succession. Spider-Man headlined Pow!, and more Marvel heroes followed: in 1967 Odhams launched two new titles entirely dedicated to Marvel superheroes: Fantastic and Terrific.

A distinctive feature of both Fantastic and Terrific was the full-colour pin-up that featured as the back cover of most issues. Many of these were reprinted from American Marvel comics, but at least some (including a Johnny Future pin-up) were produced especially for the Power Comics by a young Barry Windsor-Smith.

=== Reader outreach ===
As well as drawing heavily on Stan Lee's creative output, Power Comics also attempted to emulate Lee's chatty style and community building efforts, through their own editors, who were "Alf and Bart" on some titles, and "Alf and Cos" on others. In point of fact, "Alf" was Odhams staff editor Alf Wallace, "Bart" was Eagle editor Bob Bartholomew, and "Cos" was Albert Cosser, who would later be the editor of TVTimes magazine. Each title had its own letter column (such as "Fantastic Fan-mail"), and also a half-page editorial ("News from the Floor of 64", a reference to the editorial offices at 64 Long Acre in London, an address common to all of the Power Comics), comparable in style and purpose to Marvel's "Bullpen Bulletins".

=== "Britification" ===
As was standard practice with UK reprints of American comics, due to the larger UK page size, pages from the original American comics were rearranged (and sometimes panels dropped altogether) to fit. Unlike the otherwise similar Marvel UK reprints of the 1970s, the Marvel material in the Power Comics was frequently edited to replace American spellings and slang with their British equivalents. Dialogue and/or images were also changed occasionally to remove snags in continuity caused by the lack of synchronisation between reprints of different storylines. The alterations were quite crudely done and easy to spot.

One of the more controversial aspects of Power Comics was the relative lack of credit given to Marvel Comics and the American creators of the material used. For the first few weeks of the Marvel reprints the company was not acknowledged at all, but Odhams then had a change of heart and published a letter from a reader pointing out the origin of the strips. But, throughout, Marvel credit boxes containing the names of Stan Lee and collaborators such as Steve Ditko and Jack Kirby were invariably deleted from the splash pages; the space they occupied was either left blank or covered with drawn-in artwork. Apart from the compulsory copyright acknowledgment in small print, the name "Marvel" was never mentioned — wherever it appeared in the strips it was changed to "Power". Marvel continued to be mentioned occasionally, though. For example, when the Hulk was removed from Smash!, the editors had to justify the decision by admitting the reprints had caught up with the American originals. After a gap of several months, due to the character's popularity with readers, the Hulk reappeared, but this time in Fantastic.

== Analysis ==
=== Effect of television on the comics industry ===
The history of Power Comics reflects the managed decline of the British comics industry in general during the 1960s, in the face of falling sales resulting from the growing power of television. With the advent of commercial television in Britain in 1955, displacing the staid, old-fashioned children's television offered by the BBC up to that point, comics circulation began to decline, and the decline accelerated as competition from television increased. In the course of the 1960s, the British television industry introduced a new channel (BBC2 in 1964), cheaper television sets (in consequence of the transistor revolution), hire-purchase (broadening the market so that anyone could afford a TV), and — dealing a near death-blow to mass-market comics — launched British television into colour in Christmas 1969.

In the limited UK market, where circulation wars in the comics publishing industry were being fought against a backdrop of ever-declining circulation figures, Odhams took a big risk in launching five titles. It has been suggested that it was common practice for a publisher to quickly clone a successful title, in order to forestall its competitors from doing so, but that does not seem to have been Odhams' strategy. Smash's only distinctive feature was its American superhero strips, so Fantastic and Terrific (which most of the time contained only Marvel superhero strips) might loosely be described as clones of Smash!, even though they lacked any humour strips, but IPC had an exclusive licence from Marvel Comics to reprint Marvel's strips in the UK, which precluded anyone else from doing so.

=== 1968 economic crisis ===
The actual cause of the closures lies in the unexpected nature of the economic crisis of 1968 that hit the British economy, resulting in the devaluation of the Pound. (Note: In Britain, the devaluation crisis was major news due to certain ill-judged remarks by Prime Minister Harold Wilson, who would be mocked for the rest of his career for his infamous falsehood, "This will not affect the Pound in your pocket!") The economic chaos began with a Sterling crisis in Britain in 1967, leading to devaluation in November. There then followed a crisis for the U.S. dollar in March 1968, which had a cascade effect on the international economic system, sending first the French franc and then the West German Deutsche Mark into devaluation, and culminating in a new Sterling crisis in Britain in November 1968.

These repeated falls in the value of the pound against the U.S. dollar significantly increased the cost of publishing the American strips, which had to be paid for in dollars, and raised the daunting spectre of further increases if the pound fell in value yet again. Increasing the cover price of the Power Comics titles to compensate was impossible because of stiff competition (with sales on a sharp downward spiral, as circulation fell victim to the ever-increasing popularity of television); so the fall in the value of Sterling made the American strips unaffordable.

The toughness of the competition is apparent from examining other contemporary titles. The first issue Fantastic, published in February 1967, cost 9d for 40 pages (due to its very high content of American superhero strips), a cover price which forced Fantastic to close within 18 months. Terrific, having the same high content of American material, also had a high cover price of 9d, and closed even quicker. In contrast, the comics The Dandy and The Beano published by rival DC Thomson, sold at a cover price of 3d. Fantastic! and Terrific! cost three times as much, which (even with double the number of pages compared to many DC Thomson titles) proved unsustainable.

Wham! and Pow! each peaked at a cover price of 7d, and even that proved unsustainable. Smash! had launched in February 1966 with a cover price of 7d for 24 pages. By March 1969, although its cover price had not changed, circumstances had conspired to increase its page count, such that each issue now contained 36 pages. In fact the page-count jumped overnight from 24 to 36 pages (a fifty per cent increase), with a consequent sharp rise in production costs, and so a marked decline in profit-per-copy.

The tipping point was Smash! issue #144, in which Smash!, Pow!, and Fantastic were merged into a single title. The recently created Smash and Pow lost its Daredevil and Spider-Man strips, which together had comprised a full third of each 24-page issue, but now had to accommodate both Thor and Fantastic Four from the discontinued titles, plus a whole slew of new British adventure strips (which were being added in preparation for the comic's impending transition to solely British content). All this could not be achieved within the standard Smash! format of 24 pages. IPC "bit the bullet" and increased the page count, at a single bound, by fifty per cent – a necessity if they were to achieve their intention of reproducing with Smash! the successful formula which was buoying-up sales of their most popular titles, Lion and Valiant, both of which were 36-pagers (in effect, to produce another clone of them: an identical mix of adventure and humour, with an identical page count, at an identical price).

One fundamental difficulty for the Power Comics line, however, was always the stark economic truth that a kid could buy both The Dandy and The Beano, at 3d each, and still have change left over, for what it cost to buy Smash!, Wham! or Pow! at 7d each. The DC Thomson titles only had 16 pages, and this more than anything drove up the page count in Smash!, from its original 24 to 36 pages, and eventually to 40 pages in 1970 (i.e. it might be more than double the price of a DC Thomson title but it was also more than double the size). The difficulty was that the much lower price of The Dandy and The Beano gave those titles a significant advantage, since a kid could choose to buy only one of them, at 3d – a winning competitive advantage which, as of 1966, would keep both of the DC Thomson titles afloat for more than 30 years to come.

The highly competitive nature of the UK's publishing industry meant margins were thin: a minimum number of sales each week were needed to reach break-even point, and the lower the cover price, the greater was the number of sales needed to reach that point; but the higher the cover price, the fewer were the number of sales that could actually be achieved. The juvenile readers (or their parents) might be able to afford two or three comics a week, but by publishing five Power Comics titles, IPC were pricing themselves out of the market. The situation in Britain was not like that in America, where, with comics published just once a month, a child might afford five titles; in Britain, comics were published weekly. Under those conditions the Power Comics were effectively competing with each other – a factor IPC were certainly aware of, as the letters pages in Smash! in 1968 actually carried readers' complaints that they could not afford all five Power titles. The five together cost an astonishing three shillings and threepence a week (39d), to buy them all, far beyond the reach of the average child's weekly pocket money.

The Power Comics titles were also competing with IPC's other titles, including Lion, Valiant, and Buster, potentially dragging the group's entire line into bankruptcy. Rationalisation, by closing some of the titles, would produce an overall benefit, as it would dramatically cut IPC's production costs. Although it would mean fewer titles, as IPC's comics were actually competing against each other it ought to result in better sales for the survivors. In theory, there would be no overall loss of sales or revenue, provided readers switched from the closing titles to surviving IPC comics rather than to rival DC Thomson comics.

=== Distribution of Marvel Comics in the UK ===
Another factor Odhams had not anticipated was the distribution of American comic books within the UK. Although this had always been a consideration, the volume of such comics arriving in Britain had traditionally been small, and their distribution haphazard. In 1968, distribution and quantity suddenly underwent a marked improvement: in America, Marvel Comics' owner, Martin Goodman, pulled off a business coup that overnight freed Marvel from a restrictive distribution agreement, which for a decade had limited it to publishing only 8 titles a month: Marvel was suddenly quadrupling its monthly output, and dozens of new titles were flooding into Britain. Odhams' black-and-white Marvel reprints in their Power Comics range suddenly faced much more extensive competition from four-colour Marvel originals, and this began to harm sales.

In the turbulent economic conditions, any part of IPC's business that was loss-making had no future. Standard industry practice was to close a comic or magazine if its revenues dipped towards the break-even point; publishers did not wait for a title to actually incur losses. Hence, merely to anticipate losses on the other four titles (Pow!, Wham!, Fantastic and Terrific) was enough to doom them. The closures represented a major cost-cutting exercise, reducing the ongoing production costs on the Power Comics line by four-fifths.

As for actual losses incurred due to the sudden and unexpected nature of the problem, and the inability to quickly terminate the long-term licensing contracts with the Americans, Smash! as sole survivor could not hope to generate enough income on its own to meet these. In fact, it did not need to. The fortunate circumstance that the Power Comics were all published by Odhams Press Ltd, a subsidiary company with limited liability, meant that it was possible to ring-fence all debts on the Odhams publications within that one company, thus preventing any losses affecting the rest of the IPC Group (since IPC's other titles were all published by other IPC subsidiaries). Accordingly, with effect from 1 January 1969 Smash! was transferred to IPC Magazines Ltd, a new IPC subsidiary formed during 1968, leaving Odhams with no continuing titles, and Smash! started again from scratch. (Note: Odhams Press Ltd continued in being until 7 January 1998, when it changed its name to Formpart (No.11) Limited, which still exists as a dormant private company.)

== Power Comics titles published ==
Title	First issue	Last issue	Final number	Marvel reprints	Fate	Notes
Wham!	20 June 1964	13 January 1968	187	Fantastic Four (cont'd in Pow! and then Smash!)	Merged into Pow!	
Smash!	5 February 1966	3 April 1971	257	Hulk; Daredevil	Merged into Valiant.	Also published Batman comic strip reprints, as well as original stories of the UK superheroes Rubberman and Tri-Man.
Pow!	21 January 1967	7 September 1968	86	Spider-Man (cont'd in Smash and Pow!); Nick Fury, Agent of SHIELD	Merged into Smash!	
Fantastic	18 February 1967	26 October 1968	89	The Mighty Thor (cont'd in Smash!); X-Men; Iron Man	Merged into Smash!	Also published the UK superhero The Missing Link/Johnny Future.
Terrific	15 April 1967	3 February 1968	43	The Avengers (cont'd in Fantastic); Doctor Strange (cont'd in Fantastic); Sub-Mariner; Giant-Man	Merged into Fantastic	
