= Morgan v Odhams Press Ltd =

1971 English court case

- Court: House of Lords
- Full case name: Morgan v Odhams Press Ltd
- Decided: 1971
- Citations: [1971] q WLR 1239; [1971] 2 All ER 1156 (HL)
- Cases cited: Hough v London Express Newspaper Ltd, Jones v E Hulton & Co, Knupffer v London Express Newspaper Ltd, E Hulton & Co v Jones
- Legislation cited: None

Court membership
- Judges sitting: Lord Guest, Lord Morris of Borth-y-gest

Keywords
- Defamation, identification of the plaintiff

Morgan v Odhams Press Ltd clarified the law in England regarding identification of the plaintiff in an action for defamation.

== Claim ==
A newspaper article in The Sun (then owned by Odhams Press) reported on the kidnapping of a young woman by a dog-doping gang. The woman had been staying at the home of Mr. Morgan, a journalist, at the time of her kidnap.

Morgan claimed that even though the article did not mention him in any way, it implied to those who knew that the woman was staying with him that he was a member of the gang.

== Judgement ==
Lord Morris of Borth-y-gest ruled that even though the plaintiff was never referred to by name, nor was he even directly implicated upon strict reading of the defamatory article, he was still sufficiently identified. This was because a substantial group of people who knew the plaintiff understood that it referred to him. Lord Morris held that this was sufficient, even though no-one called to give evidence in fact believed the allegations to be true.
