= Julius Elias, 1st Viscount Southwood =

The Right Honourable The Viscount Southwood
- Born: Julius Salter Elias; 5 January 1873; Birmingham, England
- Died: 10 April 1946 (aged 73); Highgate, London, England
- Occupations: Newspaper proprietor, politician
- Employer: Odhams Bros
- Political party: Labour
- Spouse: Alice Louise Collard

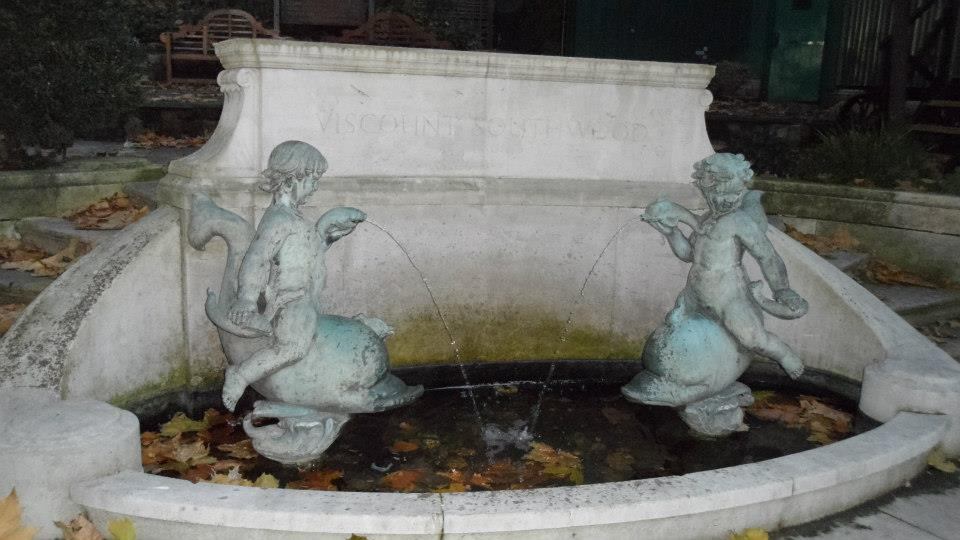
Memorial fountain in the churchyard of St James's Church, Piccadilly

Julius Salter Elias, 1st Viscount Southwood (5 January 1873 – 10 April 1946), was a British newspaper proprietor, Labour politician and hereditary peer. He rose from humble origins to become head of Odhams Press, Britain's largest newspaper and printing combine.

== Early life and education ==
Elias was born in Birmingham, the youngest of the seven children of David Elias, a manufacturer and salesman of jet buttons and brooches whose initial success in the 1860s diminished as fashions changed.

The family moved to London where his father set up as a newsagent and confectioner at 81 The Grove, Hammersmith. Elias rose at 6 a.m. each morning to deliver newspapers in Hammersmith before going to school.

Elias left school at the age of 13. His first job was doing menial tasks for a small pay of about five shillings per week. After a year, he became an office boy with Carlyle Press in Charterhouse Square, earning around six shillings per week.

In 1984 he began to work as an office-boy at Odhams Bros, then a small printing firm in Hart Street employing about twenty people. When his son began work at Odhams, David Elias returned to the jet business, reviving his links with Whitby and importing large quantities of jet buttons for London dressmakers. Although the family were not wealthy, they were able to live comfortably at Lonsdale Square at Barnsbury, Islington.

== Career ==
Elias worked his way up to become managing director and eventually chairman of the firm, which after a merger with John Bull in 1920 took the name Odhams Press Ltd. He was also managing director and chairman of the company that controlled the Illustrated London News.

Elias was raised to the peerage as Baron Southwood, of Fernhurst in the County of Sussex, in 1937. In 1944 he was appointed Chief Whip of the Labour Party in the House of Lords, which he remained until the following year. In January 1946 he was made Viscount Southwood, of Fernhurst in the County of Sussex.

== Marriage ==
In 1906, Elias married Alice Louise Collard, daughter of Charles Stone Collard, head of a London firm of chartered accountants based at Queen Victoria Street, near the Lord Mayor of London's official residence, Mansion House. They had no children.

== Death ==
Lord Southwood died from a heart attack at his Highgate home in April 1946, at the age of 73. As he had no son, the viscountcy and barony became extinct upon his death.

Party political offices
Preceded by The Earl of Listowel	Labour Party Chief Whip in the House of Lords; 1944–1945	Succeeded by The Lord Ammon
Peerage of the United Kingdom
New creation	Viscount Southwood; January–April 1946	Extinct
New creation	Baron Southwood; 1937–1946	Extinct
