= Odhams Press =

Former British publishing company

Odhams Press Ltd
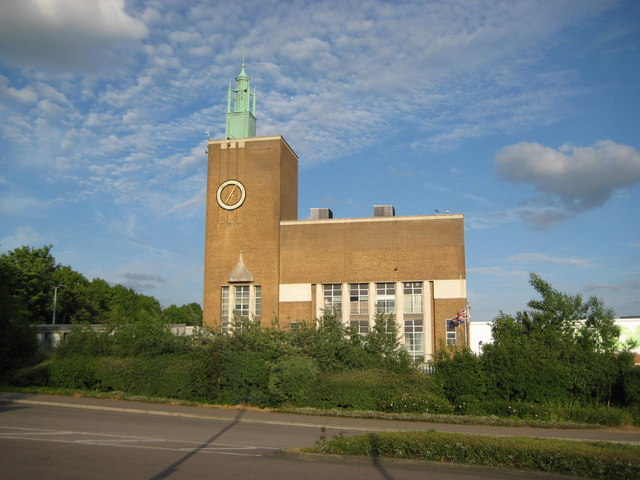
- Odhams Press Hall, Watford, built 1954
- Parent company: Fleetway Publications (1961–1963); IPC Magazines (1963–1969)
- Status: defunct (1969)
- Founded: 1870s (as William Odhams); 1920 (as Odhams Press)
- Founders: William Odhams
- Country of origin: United Kingdom
- Headquarters location: 64 Long Acre, London
- Key people: John Lynch Odhams, William James Baird Odhams, Julius Elias, 1st Viscount Southwood, Edwin Embleton, Alf Wallace, Pippa King Melling
- Publication types: magazines, books, comics
- Nonfiction topics: history, lifestyle, fashion, animals
- Fiction genres: humour, adventure, superhero
- Imprints: Odhams Books Ltd; Longacre Press; Power Comics (1966–1968)

Odhams Press Ltd was a British publishing company, operating from 1920 to 1968. Originally a magazine publisher, Odhams later expanded into book publishing and then children's comics. The company was acquired by Fleetway Publications in 1961 and then IPC Magazines in 1963. In its final incarnation, Odhams was known for its Power Comics line of titles, notable for publishing reprints of American Marvel Comics superheroes.

== History ==
=== William Odhams; Odhams Bros. ===
In 1834 William Odhams left Sherborne, Dorset, for London, (Note: According to Susan M. Penn's history of Long Street at Sherborne, Dorset, as verified by Harrop's historical house survey and by local census information, the house known since 1968 as Mistletoe Cottage was occupied in 1834 by John Odhams. His eldest son, William, grew up to be a compositor: possibly serving his apprenticeship with Langdon and Harker at the Sherborne Mercury printing office in Long Street, according to his great-granddaughter, although there is no other evidence to support this. At the rear of Mistletoe Cottage, however, is a substantial brick-built shed. The flat flooring of this shed is very solid, complete with thick oak planking, well able to support and withstand heavy items of machinery such as a printing press. Earthworks next to the shed in or around 2002 revealed evidence of many-colored printing inks still visible in the soil.) where he initially worked for The Morning Post. In 1847, he went into partnership with William Biggar in Beaufort Buildings, Savoy, London; and in the 1870s he started the business known as William Odhams. Originally a jobbing printer and newspaper publisher, William Odhams sold the business to his two sons, John Lynch Odhams and William James Baird Odhams, in 1892. The business, then a small printing firm in Hart Street employing about 20 people, became known as Odhams Bros.

=== Magazine and book publishing ===
Odhams Limited was created in 1898. Julius Elias, who left school at the age of 13 before going to work as an office boy at Odhams Bros, worked his way up to become managing director and eventually chairman of the firm, which after a merger with John Bull in 1920 took the name Odhams Press Ltd. That same year, the company also founded Ideal Home and acquired the equestrian magazine Horse & Hound.

On 28 January 1918 the Long Acre print works was hit by a bomb during a German air raid. There were 38 killed and 90 injured; it was the most damaging single bomb strike in the German bombing campaign.

Odhams acquired a 51% share in the Trades Union Congress paper the Daily Herald in 1930 (by that point, Odhams was already publishing The Sunday People). A promotion campaign ensued, and in 1933, the Herald became the world's best-selling daily newspaper, with certified net sales of 2 million. This accomplishment set off a war with more conservative London papers, such as the Daily Express.

By 1937 Odhams had founded the first colour weekly, Woman, for which it set up and operated a dedicated high-speed print works. Odhams also expanded into book publishing, for example publishing Winston Churchill's Painting as a Pastime (1965), Rupert Gunnis's Dictionary of British Sculptors 1660–1851 (1953), and an edition of the complete works of William Shakespeare.

In the 1950s, Odhams was one of London's three leading magazine publishers – along with Newnes/Pearson and the Hulton Press.

Throughout the 1960s, Odhams Books Ltd (likewise founded by Odhams Press) operated the Companion Book Club (CBC). This published a large series of hardcover novels.

=== Children's comics and acquisition by Fleetway/IPC ===
Odhams published Mickey Mouse Weekly from the 1930s (acquiring it from Willbank Publications), which featured American reprints as well as original British Disney comics material, including a number of non-Disney-related strips. Odhams lost the rights to Disney characters in 1957, and almost immediately launched the weekly comic Zip, which inherited the non-Disney strips from Mickey Mouse Weekly.

In 1959, Odhams purchased George Newnes Ltd as well as its imprint C. Arthur Pearson Ltd. Notable comics titles originally published by Pearson and continued by Odhams included the romance comics Mirabelle and Marty, and the Picture Stories and Picture Library series.

In 1959–1960, Odhams acquired Hulton Press, renaming it Longacre Press, (Note: Odhams' headquarters were at 64 Long Acre, London, inspiring the new name.) thus taking over publication of the children's comics Eagle, Girl, Swift, and Robin.

In 1960 Cecil Harmsworth King, chairman of the Daily Mirror newspaper, made an approach to Odhams on behalf of Fleetway Publications (formerly the Amalgamated Press). Odhams' board found this too attractive to refuse and, in 1961, Odhams was taken over by Fleetway. In 1963 its holdings were amalgamated with those of Fleetway and others to form the International Publishing Corporation (known as IPC). Between 1964 and 1968 Odhams operated as a subsidiary of IPC.

Odhams' "juveniles" (i.e., children's comics) competed for readers with DC Thomson, publisher of such popular titles as The Beano, The Dandy, and Commando. Alf Wallace, who had found success at Fleetway with his line of War Picture Library comics, was brought over to oversee Odhams' comics line. He was, however, unable to reverse the declining popularity of Eagle and Swift, or succeed with Boys' World, launched in 1963. In fact, by early 1964, Swift and Boys' World had both been absorbed by Eagle, which, along with Girl, was then taken over by IPC.

In desperation, Wallace recruited veteran cartoonist Leo Baxendale, who had worked for DC Thomson for many years, to create a new, energetic comics weekly. Baxendale's Wham! debuted on 20 June 1964, breaking the mould of traditional British humour strips with its use of bizarre humour, outrageous puns, and surreal plots. With the success of Wham!, the next title in the new line, Smash!, debuted on 5 February 1966. With Odhams acquiring the Marvel Comics license in early 1966, The Hulk became the first Marvel superhero to show up in an Odhams title when he debuted in Smash! #16 (21 May 1966). The popularity of that strip led to Wham! adding Fantastic Four reprints beginning 6 August 1966. In late 1966, with two Odhams' titles featuring superheroes (and the third, Pow!, on the way), the Power Comics line was created. The line, which also came to include Fantastic and Terrific, was notable for its use of superhero material reprinted from Marvel, serving as an introduction of this new breed of American superheroes to UK readers.

=== Close of business ===
In 1968 Odhams encountered financial problems, partly due to unfavourable economic conditions in Britain. As a result of this, and of IPC's desire to rationalise its titles and eliminate duplication, the comics published by the Odhams Press imprint were closed or transferred to IPC Magazines Ltd, another IPC subsidiary. This contained the losses on the Power Comics range within Odhams, which was a limited company with separate liability, but, in consequence, Odhams became financially unviable. On 1 January 1969 it effectively ceased to exist as a publishing business, when publication of its last surviving comics title, Smash!, was taken over by IPC. (Note: Alf Wallace, now out of a job with Odhams, quickly joined the comics packager Martspress, started by a former colleague at Fleetway, Leonard Matthews. Martspress took on the production of the 1969 relaunch of City Magazines' TV21; that title, which also ended up being acquired by IPC, ended up using Marvel Comics reprint material in 1970–1971.) (In 1971, Smash! merged with the IPC title Valiant.)

== Watford Press Hall ==
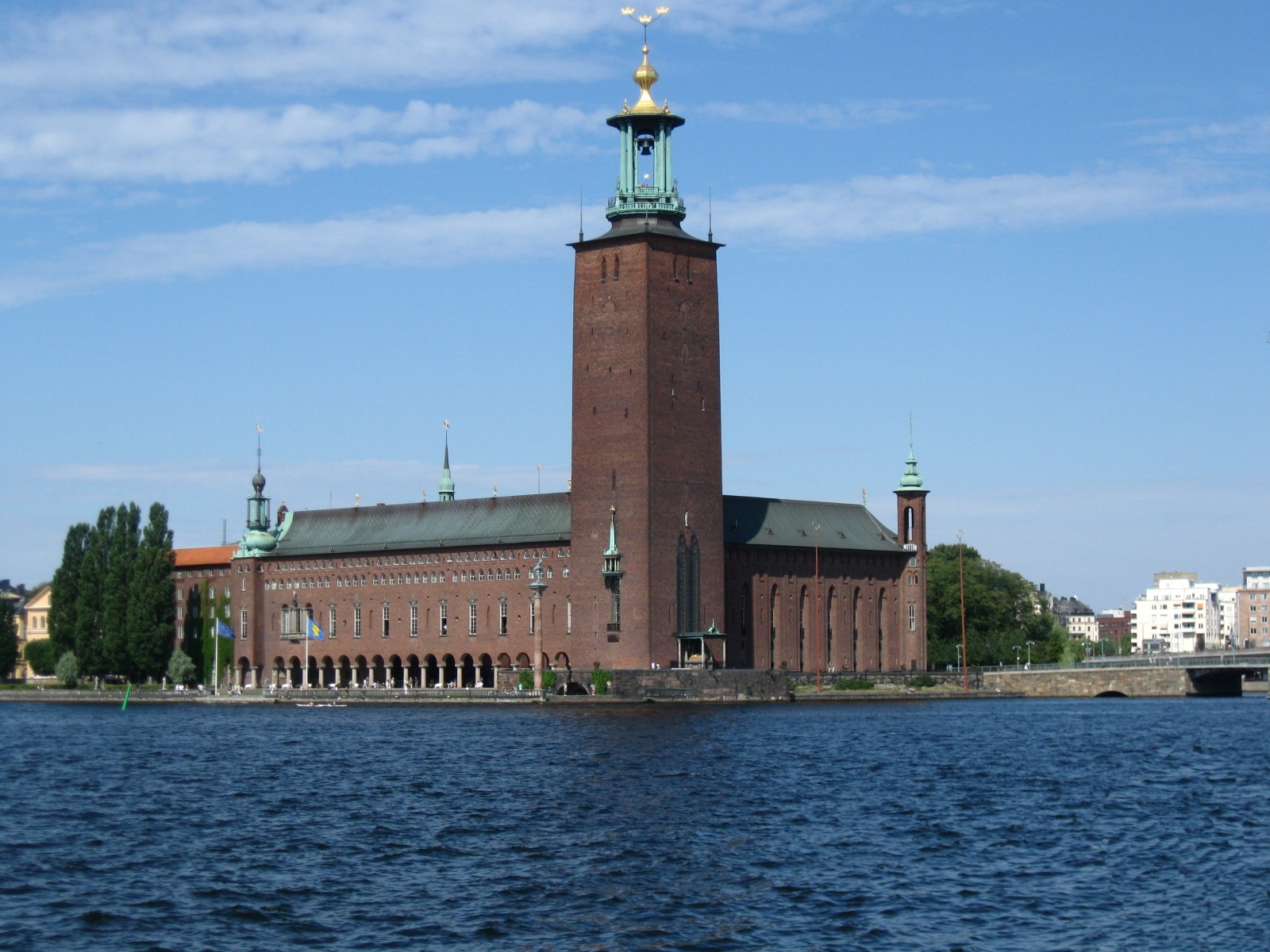
Odhams Press Hall in Watford was modelled on the design of Stockholm City Hall (Ragnar Östberg, 1923)

Odhams printworks was built in 1937 in Watford, designed by Sir Owen Williams. The new Odhams Press Hall was built 1954-57 as an extension to the existing printworks building, designed by Yates, Cook and Derbyshire. The large brick and concrete building was modelled on the design of Stockholm City Hall in Sweden, and its high clock tower is a prominent landmark in North Watford. The building is now locally listed building by Watford Borough Council because of the innovative clock tower, which houses a water tank for use in printing.

The Odhams printworks in Watford continued printing operations under IPC (later Trinity Mirror). In February 2026, the site's owners Reach plc announced that the Watford site would close, with print operations being outsouced to the Newsprinters facility in Broxbourne.

== Publications ==
=== Newspapers ===
- Daily Herald (1930–1964)
- The Sunday People (circa 1920–circa 1963)
- The Sun (1964–1969)

=== Magazines ===
- Geographical (1965–1968)
- Horse & Hound (from 1920)
- Ideal Home (founded 1920)
- John Bull (1920–1964)
- Kinematograph Weekly
- Leader Magazine
- News Review (c. 1940–1950) — merged into Illustrated magazine
- NME (1962–1968)
- The Passing Show (1915-1939)
- Picturegoer (from 1921)
- Rugby World (from 1960)
- The Motion Picture Studio (founded 1921)
- Woman (from 1937)

=== Book series ===
- Beacon Books
- Britain Illustrated
- Colourama Series (also known as: Colourama: A Pictorial Treasury of Knowledge)
- Companion Book Club editions
- Exploring Series
- Famous Criminal Trials
- Hippo Books
- Man's Book Series
- Modern Living Series
- New Educational Library
- Odhams Owner-Driver Handbooks
- The People's Home Library
- Popular Library
- University Series
- The War in Pictures

=== Comics titles ===
Title	Odhams' pub. dates	Fate	Notes
Mickey Mouse Weekly	1936–1957	Cancelled	Odhams lost rights to Disney characters in 1957
Zip	1958–1959	Merged into Swift	Contained many strip originally from Mickey Mouse Weekly
Eagle	1960–1963	Taken over and continued by IPC	Originally launched by Hulton Press in 1950; merged into Lion in 1969
Girl	1960–1964	Merged into IPC's Princess	Originally launched in 1951 by Hulton Press
Robin	1960–1963	Taken over and continued by IPC	Originally launched by Amalgamated Press in 1953; merged into IPC's Playhour in 1969
Swift	1960–1963	Merged into Eagle	Originally launched by Hulton Press in 1954 as a junior companion to Eagle
Boys' World	1963–1964	Merged into Eagle	Published under the Longacre Press imprint
Wham!	1964–1968	Merged into Pow!	
Smash!	1966–1969	Taken over by IPC	Absorbed Pow! and Wham! and then Fantastic and Terrific in 1968; merged into Valiant in 1971
Pow!	1967–1968	Merged into Smash!	
Fantastic	1967–1968	Merged into Smash!	
Terrific	1967–1968	Merged into Fantastic	

== See also ==
- Morgan v Odhams Press Ltd
