= Terrific (comics) =

1960s British comic book

- Cover of the fourth issue of Terrific, dating from 6 May 1967.

Publication information
- Publisher: Odhams Press' Power Comics
- Schedule: Weekly
- Format: Ongoing series
- Genre: Superhero
- Publication date: 15 April 1967 – 3 February 1968 (merged with Fantastic)
- No. of issues: 43
- Main character(s): The Avengers; Doctor Strange; Sub-Mariner; Giant-Man; Don Starr

Creative team
- Written by: Stan Lee
- Artist(s): Jack Kirby, Steve Ditko
- Editor(s): Alf Wallace, Bob Bartholomew

Terrific was a weekly British comic published by Odhams Press' Power Comics imprint in 1967–1968. Terrific was similar in format to its sister title Fantastic, which had started publication two months earlier. The two titles were quite unlike other British comics of the time, consisting mainly of material reprinted from American Marvel Comics, serving as an introduction to many of Marvel's superhero characters. In this respect, Fantastic and Terrific can be considered precursors of the Marvel UK weeklies such as The Mighty World of Marvel that appeared beginning in 1972.

== Publication history ==
The Power Comics imprint was led by a three-man editorial team, known as Alf, Bart, and Cos. Alfred Wallace ("Alf") was the Managing Editor at Odhams, and supervised the entire Power Comics line. Bart and Cos were the staff editors who handled the individual titles, with Bart focusing on Terrific.

Terrific #1, which launched on 15 April 1967, like its predecessor Fantastic was slightly smaller in size and on better paper than the three earlier Power Comics titles; it featured 40 pages and a higher cover price (9d, compared to 7d for 28 pages). The higher price was a result of the expensive license to reprint the Marvel stories. This made Terrific three times more expensive than the 3d cover price of competitor DC Thomson's perennials The Beano and The Dandy.

All the Marvel strips inside Terrific were printed in black-and-white, with colour used only for the front and back covers.

Terrific ran for 43 issues from 15 April 1967 until 3 February 1968, when — due to its high production costs and lack of compensatory sales — it was merged with Fantastic to form Fantastic and Terrific. The Marvel strips The Avengers and Doctor Strange moved over from Fantastic to the new title; the others were dropped.

== Style and contents ==
The one original strip in Terrific was the British secret agent strip Don Starr. The character debuted in Terrific #4 in a strip at that time called The Living Dolls (which had launched in issue #3). The strip went through a number of titles — Drama of Doom, Appointment With Fear, Appointment With Mr. Big — before officially becoming Don Starr in issue #27. The strip occasionally crossed over with The Rubber Man feature in Smash!.

The Marvel stories which were reprinted (in black-and-white) in Terrific featured The Avengers and the Doctor Strange strips from Strange Tales. Sub-Mariner stories from Tales to Astonish ran for the first 22 issues; they were then replaced by Giant-Man and the Wasp stories from the same source.

The Marvel material in the Power Comics titles were frequently edited to replace American spellings and slang with their British equivalents. Dialogue or images were also changed occasionally to remove snags in continuity caused by the lack of synchronisation between reprints of different storylines. Despite the amount of Marvel Comics material in the title, there was a relative lack of credit given to Marvel and the individual American creators of the material used. Marvel credit boxes containing the names of Stan Lee, Steve Ditko, Jack Kirby, and the like were invariably deleted from the splash pages; the space they occupied was either left blank or covered with drawn-in artwork. Apart from the compulsory copyright acknowledgment in small print, the name "Marvel" was never mentioned — wherever it appeared in the strips it was changed to "Power".

A distinctive feature of Terrific was the full-colour pin-up that featured as the back cover of most issues. Many of these were reprinted from American Marvel comics, but at least some were produced especially for Power Comics by a young Barry Windsor-Smith.
