= Pow! (comics) =

British comic book

- The cover of Pow! #1 (21 January 1967).

Publication information
- Publisher: Odhams Press' Power Comics
- Schedule: weekly
- Format: Ongoing series
- Genre: Superhero
- Publication date: 21 January 1967 – 7 September 1968 (merged into Smash!)
- No. of issues: 86
- Main character(s): Spider-Man (reprints); Nick Fury, Agent of SHIELD (reprints); The Dolls of St Dominics; The Group; Kicks; Wee Willie Haggis: The Spy from Skye; Dare-a-Day Davy; The Cloak; The Python; Jack Magic; Wiz War

Creative team
- Written by: Stan Lee (reprints)
- Artist(s): Steve Ditko (reprints), Jack Kirby (reprints), Ron Spencer, Mike Brown, Ken Reid, Mike Higgs
- Editor: Bart

Pow! was a weekly British comic book published by Odhams Press' Power Comics imprint in 1967 and 1968. Like other Power Comics, Pow! featured a mixture of British strips with reprints from American Marvel Comics, including Spider-Man, Nick Fury, Agent of SHIELD and the Fantastic Four.

It is unrelated to POW! Entertainment, an American media production company.

== Publication history ==
Advertisement for Pow! in the 1968 Fantastic Summer Special.

The Power Comics imprint was led by a three-man editorial team, known as Alf, Bart, and Cos. Alfred Wallace ("Alf") was the Managing Editor at Odhams, and supervised the entire Power Comics line. Under his direction, Bart and Cos were the staff editors who handled the individual titles. Bart (a pen-name for Eagle's Bob Bartholemew) was the editor directly responsible for Pow!.

Pow! first appeared on 21 January 1967. It was printed on newsprint stock, in black-and-white except for its colour front and back covers, and initially comprised 28 pages.

After 12 months, with its 53rd issue, cover-dated 13 January 1968, it absorbed its sister title Wham! to form Pow! and Wham!.

The 86th and final issue appeared on 7 September 1968, after which it merged into Smash!, another of the Power Comics line of five titles.

== Strips and characters ==
Pin-up published in the 1968 Fantastic Summer Special.

Like the other Power Comics, Pow! supplemented its British content with reprints from American Marvel Comics, all written by Stan Lee. Spider-Man (drawn by Steve Ditko) and Nick Fury, Agent of SHIELD (drawn by Jack Kirby), began in issue #1. After the merger with Wham! in issue #53, the Fantastic Four (also drawn by Kirby) joined the Pow! lineup.

Other than the American superheroes, Pow! principally featured British humour strips. These included Kicks, Wee Willie Haggis: The Spy from Skye, Ken Reid's Dare-a-Day Davy (in colour, for the back page), Ron Spencer's The Dolls of St Dominic's, Mike Brown's The Group and Wiz War, and (from issue #18) Mike Higgs' The Cloak. It also featured some adventure strips, including The Python and Jack Magic.

The premise of Reid's Dare-a-Day Davy was that he was a character who could not resist dares set for him by readers. In one episode, Davy was dared to dig up Frankenstein's monster and bring him back to life — for which Reid decided to employ the "kiss of life". The episode, which included the desecration of a grave, the re-assembling of a shattered skeleton, and a young boy kissing a corpse, was too gruesome for the editors of Pow! and it was pulled from publication. (Note: Interestingly, the strip would probably not have been banned if it had been in an American comic, as the Comics Code Authority permitted horror in comics if it was derived from classic literature (defined as including Dracula and Frankenstein), and this strip appears to have met that condition.) The episode eventually saw print in the UK small press magazine Weird Fantasy, published by David Britton, in 1969.

Higgs' The Cloak was about a secret agent, the top agent for Britain's Special Squad, nominally a part of Scotland Yard. He usually operated from his personal headquarters, known as the Secret Sanctum. The Cloak's ingenuity and never-ending supply of gadgets and secret weapons gave him the edge over his somewhat odd enemies (some are very odd, including Deathshead and various other agents of G.H.O.U.L.). He had some equally odd colleagues. Assisted initially by Mole (the tall one with the bald head, big nose, and spectacles) and Shortstuff (the short squirt with the hairy nut and big eyeballs), he began having adventures in which he found himself also alongside the sexy and flirtatious Lady Shady, the shady lady. The strip benefited from the unusual, idiosyncratic drawing style of Higgs, whose overt inclusion of pop culture imagery made the strip seem extremely modern.

Brown's Wiz War was about a feud between two wizards, Wizard Prang (Note: "Wizard Prang" was RAF slang from the Second World War.) and his enemy Demon Druid. Other than the fact that Prang was robed entirely in white, befitting his status as the good guy, and Demon Druid was always in black, being the villain of the piece, their costumes were quite similar — a flowing wizard's robe with stars on it, and a pointed hat. They flew around on broomsticks, zapping each other with spells which turned the other into a toad or something equally amusing. Wizard Prang was alternately helped and hindered by Englebert, his pet bird. The best feature of the strip was the sign above Wizard Prang's front door. This usually read "Wizard Prang is... In" (if he was at home) or "Wizard Prang is... Out" (if he was out and about); but if he'd had a bad time in the story, the sign would often make a humorous remark in the final panel, such as "Wizard Prang is... All at Sea". Brown seems to have been unaware of the Odhams house rule banning artists from signing their work, as the strip often bore his name.

Upon Pow!'s absorption of Wham!, Spencer's The Dolls of St Dominics was merged with Leo Baxendale's strip The Tiddlers to become The Tiddlers and The Dolls.

Upon Pow!'s merger with Smash! a few strips continued into the merged publication Smash! and Pow!, including Spider-Man, Fantastic Four, The Cloak, and Wiz War.
