= Ideal Home =

British home decorating magazine

- Cover of the October 2024 issue
- Editor: Heather Young
- Categories: Home magazine
- Frequency: 12 times per year
- Circulation: 124,779 (ABC Jan-Dec 2021); Print and digital editions.
- Founded: 1920
- Company: Future plc
- Country: United Kingdom
- Based in: London
- Language: English
- Website: www.idealhome.co.uk

Ideal Home is a British home decorating magazine, published monthly (12 times a year) by Future plc. Published since 1920, the magazine focuses on home interior decoration articles; reader homes; high-street shopping news and consumer advice. Every issue includes a 20-page section dedicated to kitchen and bathroom makeovers.

Ideal Home magazine has been edited by Heather Young since 2021. Its headquarters is in London.

The website of the magazine launched in 2005 as an extension of the magazine. It features galleries of room images, decorating advice features, forums, blogs, shopping news and competitions.

Ideal Home magazine underwent a design and content revamp on the May 2010 issue. It now sports new features, typography and layout along with a redesigned logo. The revamped copy went on sale on 30 March 2010. For the second half of 2021 the magazine had a circulation of 124,779 copies.
