= Boys' World =

Comic Magazine

Publication information
- Publisher: Longacre Press
- Schedule: Weekly
- Format: Ongoing series
- Publication date: 26 January 1963 – 3 October 1964
- No. of issues: 89
- Main character(s): Billy Binns and his Wonderful Specs; John Brody; Brett Million; Pike Mason; Wrath of the Gods; Dr What and His Time Clock

Creative team
- Written by: Tom Tully
- Artist(s): Ron Embleton, Brian Lewis, Frank Bellamy

Boys' World was a boys' comic magazine published in the UK by Longacre Press. It ran for 89 issues beginning on 26 January 1963, and in 1964 it merged with the Eagle. Boys' World featured the mythological serial strip Wrath of the Gods, painted in colour by Ron Embleton and the earliest comic strip parody of Doctor Who: Dr What and His Time Clock. Among the other artists who worked for the comic were Brian Lewis and Frank Bellamy. Writers included Harry Harrison, Sydney Jordan and Michael Moorcock. The regular Boys' World cover feature, 'What Would You Do?' - a series challenging readers to find the solution to perilous situations - inspired the similarly-titled sequence of impossible moral dilemmas posed in Moorcock's novel Breakfast in the Ruins (1972).

The headquarters of Boys' World was in London.
