= Stanley McMurtry =

- Born: 4 May 1936 (age 90) Edinburgh, Scotland
- Area: Cartoonist
- Notable works: Editorial cartoons for the Daily Mail; Percy's Pets
- Awards: MBE (2004)

Stanley McMurtry MBE (born 4 May 1936), known by his pen name Mac, is a British editorial cartoonist. McMurtry is best known for his controversial work for the British Daily Mail newspaper from 1971 to 2018.

== Career ==
McMurtry was born in Edinburgh on 4 May 1936. His family moved to Birmingham when he was eight years old and he studied at Birmingham College of Art. He undertook National Service with the Royal Army Ordnance Corps from 1954 to 1956.

He adopted the pen name "Mac" while working as a cartoonist for the Daily Sketch in the 1960s. That publication was absorbed by the Daily Mail in 1971, and he worked there for the rest of his career. McMurtry was appointed a Member of the Order of the British Empire (MBE) in the 2004 New Year Honours for "services to the newspaper industry".

McMurtry's comic strip Percy's Pets was a regular feature in Smash! from 1966 to c. 1970.

He appeared as a castaway on the BBC Radio programme Desert Island Discs on 23 March 2008.

== Work ==
McMurtry viewed his role as making "dreary news copy of the daily paper brighter, by putting in a laugh", and claimed that his work was apolitical despite its frequent engagement with issues of race, gender, and sexuality. His practice was to produce three or more drafts each day, on differing topics, from which his editor would choose one to be drawn to finished standard. In most of his daily cartoons, Mac included a small portrait of his wife hidden within the picture.

== Controversy ==
McMurtry's cartoons have frequently drawn condemnation for alleged homophobia, racism, and sexism.

In 2001, the British Medical Association received an apology from the Daily Mail for its publication of a McMurtry cartoon which depicted a black, immigrant "witch doctor" jumping on the bed of a shocked, white NHS patient.

In November 2015, Mac was accused of "spectacular racism" for his cartoon featuring caricatures of African tribes people selling shrunken heads, which referred to the news that singer Tom Jones would undergo tests to discover whether he had black ancestry. Later the same month, following the Paris attacks by Jihadists, Mac produced a cartoon depicting refugees with exaggerated noses crossing the EU's borders with rats at their feet. Some journalists suggested the cartoon evoked antisemitic imagery used by Nazi propagandists, including in their notorious film The Eternal Jew (1940).

== Retirement ==
Mac retired from the Daily Mail in December 2018. His last cartoon, published on 20 December, was autobiographical, depicting Mac physically resisting being forced into the "Sunset Home for Retired Cartoonists". An eight-page supplement commemorating his work had been included in the previous day's edition of the paper.

Mac came out of retirement in December 2020 to work for the Mail on Sunday.

== Publications ==
- Bryant, Mark; McMurtry, Stanley (2018). 50 years of MAC: a half century of British life. Little, Brown. ISBN 978-1472141620.
