= List of British comic strips =

Morgyn the mighty 1928 -

The following is a list of British Comic Strips. A comic strip is a sequence of drawings arranged in interrelated panels to display brief humor or form a narrative, often serialized, with text in balloons and captions.

The coloured backgrounds denote the publisher:

– indicates D. C. Thomson.
– indicates AP, Fleetway and IPC Comics.
– indicates Viz.
– indicates a strip published in a newspaper.

Strip	Publication(s)	Dates	Notes
The 12½p Buytonic Boy	Krazy, Whizzer and Chips	1976 - 1986	
Ace Trucking Co.	2000 AD	1981 - 1986	
Addie and Hermy	The Dandy	1940s	
Alex	London Daily News, The Independent, The Daily Telegraph	1987 - 2025	
Andy Capp	Daily Mirror, Sunday Mirror	1957 -	
AXA	The Sun	1978 - 1986	
Beat Your Neighbour	Knockout, Whizzer and Chips	1971	
Beau Peep	Daily Star	1978 - 2016	
Beelzebub Jones	Daily Mirror	1937 - 1945	
Belinda	Daily Mirror	1936 - 1959	
Beryl the Peril	The Topper	1953 -	
Bessie Bunter	The Schoolgirl	1919 - 1949	
Biff	The Guardian	1985 -	
Biffa Bacon	Viz		
Biffo the Bear	The Beano	1948 - 1986	
Big Vern	Viz		
Billy Bunter	The Magnet, Knockout, The Comet	1908 - 1958	
Billy's Boots	Tiger, Scorcher, Eagle, Roy of the Rovers	1961 - ?	
Billy the Bee	Evening Standard	1950s	
Billy the Fish	Viz		
Billy Whizz	The Beano	1964 -	
Birdman and Chicken	Krazy		
Black Bag	Viz		
Bobby Bear	Daily Herald	1919 - ?	
Bobby's Ghoul	Whizzer and Chips, Buster		
Bookworm	Whoopee!, Whizzer and Chips		
Brickman	Harrier Comics	1979 - 2009	
Bristow	Aberdeen Press & Journal, Birmingham Evening Mail	1961 - 2010	
Brown Bottle	Viz		
Buck Ryan	Daily Mirror	1937 - 1962	
The Bumpkin Billionaires	Whoopee!, Whizzer and Chips, Buster	1974 - 2000	
Buster Capp	Buster		
Buster Gonad	Viz		
Cannonball Kid	Nutty	1980 - 1985	
Captain Biplane			
Captain Morgan and his Hammond Organ	Viz		
Captain Star	NME, The Observer		
Celeb	Private Eye		
Charley's War	Battle Picture Weekly	1979 - 1985	
Charlie Peace	Valiant, Buster	1964 - 1974	
Clare in the Community	The Guardian		
Cliff Hanger	Buster	1983 - 1999	
The Cloggies	Private Eye, The Listener	1967 - 1986	
Cockney Wanker	Viz		
Colonel Pewter			
Countdown	Countdown (Polystyle Publications)	1971 - 1973	
The Crimson Ball	The Dandy	1963–1964	
The Critics	Viz		
Dan Dare	Eagle	1950 - 1994	
Dangerous Dan	The Beano	2011	
Dennis the Menace	The Beano	1951 -	
Desert Island Teacher	Viz		
Desperate Dan	The Dandy	1937 -	
Dirty Dick	The Dandy	1960s	
Doctor Poo	Viz		
Doomlord	Eagle	1982 - 1991	
Dredger	Action	1976 - 1978	
Drunken Bakers	Viz		
Eight Ace	Viz		
Em	The London Paper, The Sun	2006 - 2010	
Ernie	Eagle	1982 - 1983	
Emperor of the Daleks	Doctor Who Magazine	1993	
Faceache	Jet, Buster	1971 - 1988	
Farmageddon	Hartlepool Mail	1992 - 1994	
Farmer Palmer	Viz		
The Fat Slags	Viz	1989 -	
Felix and his Amazing Underpants	Viz		
Ferdinand the Foodie	Viz		
Finbarr Saunders	Viz		
Fishboy	Buster	1968 - 1975	
Flook	Daily Mail	1949 - 1984	
The Fosdyke Saga	Daily Mirror	1971 - 1985	
Fred Basset	Daily Mail, The Mail on Sunday	1963 -	
Fru T. Bunn	Viz		
Fuss Pot	Knockout, Whizzer and Chips, Buster	1971 - 2000	
The Gambols	Daily Express, The Mail on Sunday	1950 -	
Garth	Daily Mirror	1943 - 1997	
Genius	The Observer	1978 - 1983	
George Bestial	Viz		
Gilbert Ratchet	Viz	1990 - ?	
Grassy Knollington	Viz		
Great Pop Things	Record Mirror, NME		
Grimbledon Down	New Scientist	1970 - 1994	
Grimly Feendish	Wham!, Smash!	1964 - ?	
Harlem Heroes	2000 AD		
Harold's Planet	Online, Financial Times, The Scotsman	1998 -	
Hellman of Hammer Force	Action	1976 - 1978	
The House of Dolmann	Valiant	1966 - 1973	
If...	The Guardian	1981 -	
Ivan Jelical	Viz		
Ivor Lott and Tony Broke	Cor!!, Buster		
Jack Black	Viz		
James Bond	Daily Express, The Sunday Times	1958 - 1983	
Jane	Daily Mirror	1932 - 1959	
Japhet and Happy	The Daily News, News Chronicle	1919 - ?	
Jeff Hawke	Daily Express	1955 - 1974	
Jet-Ace Logan	The Comet, Tiger, Thriller Picture Library	1956 - 1972	
Joe Soap	Eagle	1982 - 1983	
Johnny Fartpants	Viz		
Joker	Knockout, Whizzer and Chips	1971 - 2000	
Judge Dredd	2000 AD, Judge Dredd Megazine	1977 -	
Junior Rotter	Whizzer and Chips, Buster		
Just Jake	Daily Mirror	1938 - 1952	
Karenni the Minx	Viz		
Kewl Chix	Viz		
Kid Chameleon	Cor!!	1970 - 1972	
King's Counsel	The Times	1993 - Present	
Laurie Driver	Viz		
Lazy Bones	Whizzer and Chips	1978 - ?	
The Leopard from Lime Street	Buster	1976 - 1985	
Leviathan	The Independent on Sunday	1990s	
Lost Consonants	The Guardian, The Observer		
Luck of the Legion	Eagle	1952 - 1961	
Luvvie Darling	Viz		
Major Misunderstanding	Viz		
Master Mind	Buster	1980 - 1983	
Maxwell the Magic Cat	Northants Post	1979 - 1986	Written by Alan Moore under a pseudonym.
Memory Banks	Whizzer and Chips, Buster		
Mickey the Monkey	The Topper	1953 - 1970s	
Mickey's Miniature Grandpa	Viz		
Mickey's Monkey Spunk Moped	Viz	1993 - 2010	
Millie Tant	Viz		
The Modern Parents	Viz		
Modesty Blaise	Evening Standard, Evening Citizen, Modesty Blaise Quarterly	1963 - 2002	
Mr Logic	Viz		
Mrs Brady the Old Lady	Viz		
Mummy's Boy	Monster Fun, Buster		
Mustapha Million	Cheeky Weekly, Whoopee!, Whizzer and Chips	1977 - 1990	
Nobby's Piles	Viz		
Norbert Colon	Viz		
Odd Ball	Whizzer and Chips, Buster		
Ogri	Bike, Back Street Heroes	1970s -	
Ollie and Quentin		2002 - 2011	
Oojah	Daily Sketch	1919 - 1958	
One-Eyed Jack	Action	1975 - 1977	
Orson Cart	Viz		
Pathetic Sharks	Viz		
Paul Whicker	Viz		
The Perishers	Daily Mirror	1959 - 2006 ( re-prints from 2010 -)	
Pip, Squeak and Wilfred	Sunday Pictorial, Daily Mirror	1919 - 1956	
Pirates of the Caribeano	The Beano	2006 - 2009	
Postman Plod	Viz		
The Purple Cloud	The Dandy	1961 (re-run 1968–1969)	
Queens Counsel	The Times	1993 -	
Raffles, Gentleman Thug	Viz		
Rat Boy	Viz		
Rob Riley	Ranger, Look and Learn		
Robot Archie	Lion	1952 - 1974	
Rogan Gosh	Revolver	1990	
Roger Irrelevant	Viz		
Roger Mellie	Viz		
Romeo Brown	Daily Mirror	1954 - 1963	
Roy of the Rovers	Tiger, Roy of the Rovers (comic)	1954 - 1995	
Rupert Bear	Daily Express	1920 -	
Scarth A.D. 2195	The Sun		
School Belle	School Fun, Buster	1983 - 2000	
The Seekers	Daily Sketch	1966 - 1971	
Sexton Blake	Halfpenny Marvel, Union Jack (magazine), Detective Weekly, The Boys' Friend, Penny Pictorial, The Sexton Blake Library, Knockout, Valiant, Tornado	1893 - 1979	
Sid's Snake	Whizzer and Chips	1969 - 2000	
Sid the Sexist	Viz		
The Silent Three	School Friend	1950 - 1963	
Skid Kidd	Buster		
Spider	Lion, Vulcan	1965 - 1971	
Steel Claw	Valiant	1962 - 1973	
Store Wars	Whizzer and Chips		
Striker	The Sun, Nuts	1985 - 2010	
Strontium Dog	Starlord, 2000 AD	1978–present	
Student Grant	Viz		
Suburban Satanists	Geek, Herman Hedning	1997 -	
Suicidal Syd	Viz		
The Suicide Six	Tiger		
Super School	The Beano	2008 -	
Sweary Mary	Viz	1994 - 1995	
Sweeny Toddler	Shiver and Shake, Whoopee!, Whizzer and Chips	1973 - 2000	
Sweet Tooth	Whizzer and Chips	1973 - 2000	
Tamara Drewe	The Guardian	2005 - 2007	
Tasha Slappa	Viz		
Teddy Tail	Daily Mail	1915 - 1960s	
Tharg the Mighty	2000 AD	1977 -	
The Things	Viz		
Thrud the Barbarian	White Dwarf	1981 - 2007	
Tinribs	Viz		
Toby Twirl		1946 - 1958	
Tom Thug	Oink!, Buster	1986 - 2000	
Tomboy	Cor!!, Buster		
Tommy "Banana" Johnson	Viz		
Tranny Magnet	Viz	2000 - ?	
Tricky Dicky	Cor!!		
The Trigan Empire	Ranger magazine, Look and Learn	1965 - 1982	
Tug Transom			
Victorian Dad	Viz		
Vid Kid	Buster	1987 - 2000	
Warlord	Warlord (DC Thomson)	1974 - 1986	
Watch Out Beagle's About	Buster		
Whacky	Cor!!, Buster	1970 - 1973	
Wicked Willie		1984 -	
Wonder Wellies	Buster	1983 - 1985	
X-Ray Specs	Monster Fun, Buster	1975 - 2000	
Yankee Dougal	Viz		

== Lesser known British comic strips ==
- Belinda was modelled after the American Strip Little Orphan Annie was published in the Daily Mirror. It was drawn by Steve Dowling and Tony Royle during the 1930s & 1940s.
- Billy and Bunny was a long-running comic strip featured in a Scottish Newspaper. They were drawn by James Crighton better known for drawing Korky the Cat for The Dandy comic. Billy was a young boy and Bunny was an anthropomorphised rabbit. Their stories were set in a fantasy fairytale world where they often got up to mischief. There were several annuals from 1922 to 1941 and in 1948 & 1949. Even on the last 1949 Annual, they were still wearing their early 1920s trademark spats and gaiters, a popular male fashion item from decades before. These annuals were all published by John Leng & Co, London
- Boy meets Girl was started in the Sunday Dispatch in 1940. It was drawn by Rouson and featured amusing ways of boy meeting girl
- Carol Day was a strip created by painter David Wright, and continued after his death by Kenneth Inns. It was published initially in 1956 in the Daily Mail, but later in 1971, it was in the Sunday Express. Carol was an ex-fashion model and was drawn as being very elegant.
- Come on Steve Published initially in the Sunday Express in 1936 and transferred to the Sunday Dispatch in 1941. It was drawn by Roland Davies. The character "Steve" was a cart horse name after the British jockey Steve Donoghue. The expression "Come on Steve" was a cheer used by racing fans to encourage Donoghue.
- Dot and Carrie was introduced as a three-month trial in the London Evening Standard at the end of 1922. It transferred to the London Evening News on 18 October 1960, finally ceasing on 23 May 1964. its author was J F Horrabin. Dot and Carrie were secretaries in an office under a Mr Spillikin.
- Eb and Flo were drawn by Wilfred Haughton who also drew the Mickey Mouse Annuals from 1931 to 1939 and the Mickey Mouse Weekly comic covers as well as the Bobby Bear annuals in the 1930s. Haughton first drew this cartoon strip for The Daily Herald before his 1930s Disney work. It was about two Negro orphans, Ebenezer and Florence, who acted as parents to the unnamed Twins. Also featured were Timothy - a school pal, Uncles Joe and Desmond, Auntie Kate, Gran'pa and their pup, Sausage. There was a later annual published in 1939 (as dated by a 1939 inscription as found in a copy) by Deans called Eb' and Flo' annual which featured stories and reprinted cartoon strips all in a similar style to the Mickey Mouse Annuals. From their initial appearance in the late 1920s, an enamelled badge shows Eb and Flo were the characters related to the 'Cheery Coons Club' for the Sunday People newspaper in the early 1930s.
- Flint of the Flying Squad was published in the Daily Express, starting in 1952. It was written by Alan Stranks and drawn by George Davies. The characters were used on a BBC Radio Home Service series in 1952, starring Bruce Seton, Mary Mackenzie & Norman Claridge. This used the same title
- Jimpy was drawn by Hugh McClelland (cartoonist). It started in the Daily Mirror on 5 January 1946 and lasted for six years. Set in medieval times the main character was a youth trying to become an apprentice wizard. Selection of title frames
- The Larks drawn by Jack Dunkley in the Daily Mirror, it was first seen on 5 August 1957.
- Lord God Almighty by Steve Bell appeared in The Leveller in the 1970s
- The Nipper started during 1933 in the Daily Mail and was drawn by Brian White (cartoonist). An annual was produced for many years. The nipper was a child of about 2 years age, who was able to get into the mischief of children of that age . It should not be confused with the Canadian comic strip by Doug Wright about a similar child, but about 4 years old, and in a Canadian suburban setting.
- Paul Temple a strip based on Francis Durbridge's radio detective started in the London Evening News 19 November 1951 and lasted over twenty years, The graphics were by Alfred Sindall.
- Penny by George Davies appeared in the Sunday Pictorial during the 1940s and 1950s. The strip is featured in the film Penny and the Pownall Case (1948).
- Psycops. A strip that appeared in The Sun between 1994 and 1999. Written by Pete Nash (Striker) and illustrated by Nash, John Cooper and John M Burns.
- Sporting Sam was thirty years from 1944 in the Sunday Express. It was produced by Reg Wootton.
- Spotlight on Sally by Arthur Ferrier appeared in the News of the World at the end of World War II. It was contemporary and competed with the strip Jane.
- Tim, Toots & Teeny' were a cartoon strip in the Daily Chronicle newspaper from at least 1929, and there were several annuals issued starting in 1930 to at least 1937, as the undated 1931 to 1938 Annuals inclusive. These annuals were published by George Newnes of London, and feature Tim (a cat), Toots (a pig) and Tiny (a duck). The first 1931 Annual states 'A Whole Year Of Adventure with the Famous Pets'. No artist or linked newspaper name is mentioned in these annuals, leaving them remaining unknown until two Christmas and Birthday postcards revealed their origins. A copy of the 1934 annual was found in the printer's archives, Jarrold & Sons Ltd, Norwich, stamped 'Jarrolds Factory Book Dept.' To identify the set of eight Tim Toots & Teeny Annual books, 1931 Orange Car, 1932 Leapfrog, 1933 Train, 1934 Bicycle, 1935 Toy Plane, 1936 River Boat, 1937 Treehouse & 1938 Fairground are the front covers.
- Varoomshka by John Kent appeared in The Guardian in the 1970s.
- Wildcat was a long-running comic strip in the anarchist newspaper Freedom, drawn by Donald Rooum.

== See also ==
- British comics
- List of Beano comic strips
- List of Dandy comic strips
- List of Viz comic strips
- List of 2000 AD stories
- List of D. C. Thomson & Co. Ltd publications
- List of AP, Fleetway and IPC Comics publications
