= 1969 in comics =

Notable events of 1969 in comics.

== Events ==
=== Year overall ===
- Paragon Publications is established in Longwood, Florida, by Bill Black.
- Tower Comics goes out of business.
- Kinney National Company, parent of National Periodical Publications, takes over Warner Bros.-Seven Arts, changing its name to just Warner Bros..
- Chuck Rozanski starts selling comics at age 13, from his parents' basement, which is the foundation of Mile High Comics, a comics store in Boulder, Colorado. He would open Mile High as a professional store at age 19.

=== January ===
- January 2: In the magazine Pilote, the first episode of the Lucky Luke story Jesse James, by René Goscinny and Morris is serialized.
- Rip Off Press established in San Francisco by Gilbert Shelton, Jaxon, Dave Moriaty, and Fred Todd.
- Sub-Mariner #9: First appearance of the Serpent Crown.
- Marvel Super-Heroes #18: debut of the Guardians of the Galaxy (created by Arnold Drake and Gene Colan, from an idea by Roy Thomas and Stan Lee)

=== February ===
- February 1: The first issue of the underground comix magazine Gothic Blimp Works is published. It will last until 1 September.
- February 18: In Tintin, the first chapters of the Ric Hochet story Cauchemar pour Ric Hochet by André-Paul Duchâteau and Tibet are serialized. In the same issue the Bruno Brazil story Commando Caiman by Greg and William Vance takes off.
- February 24: The first issue of the French comics magazine Pif Gadget is published. It marks the debut of Rahan by Roger Lécureux and André Chéret, as well as Henri Crespi and Marc Moallic's Ludovic.
- February 27: The first episode of Bob De Groot and Turk's gag comic Robin Dubois is published in Tintin.
- The Golden Age character Phantom Stranger makes his first Silver Age appearance in Showcase #80.
- Flash Gordon (1966 series), with issue #12, is picked up by Charlton Comics, taking over from the defunct King Comics.
- In France, the first issue of Charlie Mensuel is published.

=== March ===
- March 15: The first episode of Tom Tully and Francisco Solano López's Janus Stark is published.
- March 22: The first episode of Martin Lodewijk and Dino Attanasio's Johnny Goodbye is serialized in Pep.
- The final issue of the Italian comics magazine Killing is published.
- Strange Adventures, with issue #217, becomes a reprint title. (DC Comics)
- Renzo Barbieri and Giorgio Cavedon's Jacula makes its debut.
- Tex Gigante gets number 100; Bonelli celebrates the achievement publishing, for the first time, an album in colors (Supertex, by Gianluigi Bonelli and Galep).
- In France, the first issue of the sci-fi horror comic magazine Wampus, by Marcel Navarro and Luciano Bernasconi (Éditions Lug, is published. Because of its extreme violent content, censors force it into cancellation after only six months.

=== April ===
- April 10: The first issue of the erotic series Lucrezia by Renzo Barbieri (Ediperiodici) is launched, inspired by the life of Lucrezia Borgia.
- April 19: Nikola Lekić and Lazo Sredanović 's Dikan makes its debut.
- April 26: The final issue of the British comics magazine Eagle is published.
- April 26: The final episode of Ted Cowan and Reg Bunn's The Spider is published.
- April 28: Charles M. Schulz opens his own ice arena, Redwood Empire in Santa Rosa, California.
- House of Mystery #179, "The Man Who Murdered Himself" was the first professional comic work by artist Bernie Wrightson.

=== May ===
- May 10 : In Tintin, The Adventures of Alix story Le Dieu Sauvage by Jacques Martin starts its serialisation.
- May 15: The first episode of Jaroslav Němeček's Čtyřlístek is published.
- May 15: In Pilote, the Blueberry story The Mine of the Lost German by Jean-Michel Charlier and Jean Giraud is first serialized, the first chapter of the diptych Superstition mountains.
- May 18: The command and lunar module for the Apollo 10 are named after Charlie Brown and Snoopy.
- May 22: In Pilote, the first chapter of Asterix in Spain, by Goscinny and Uderzo is serialized.
- May 29 : In Spirou, the first Spirou and Fantasio story drawn by Jean-Claude Fournier, Le Faiseur d'Or (The Gold Maker) is serialized.
- The first issue of the Dutch underground magazine Aloha is published. It will run until April 1974.
- The first episode of Max Bunker and Roberto Raviola's Alan Ford is published.
- The final issue of the magazine Not Brand Echh is published.
- Il giuramento (The oath) by Gian Luigi Bonelli and Aurelio Galeppini; for the first time, the circumstances surrounding the death of Lilith (Tex Willer’s Indian wife) are revealed.

=== June ===
- June 8: In the Disney magazine Topolino, the Donald Duck story Paperinik il Diabolico Vendicatore (The Demonic Avenger) by Guido Martina and Giovan Battista Carpi is first serialized. This marks the debut of Donald Duck's masked crusader alter ego Paperinik, created by Elisa Penna. Paperinik will remain a staple of the Italian Disney comics universe.
- June 19: In a daily Mickey Mouse comic by Del Connell and Floyd Gottfredson, Gloria Bee, Goofy’s girlfriend, makes her debut.
- June 28: The final episode of Charles Kuhn's Grandma is published.
- DC Comics raises the price of its typical comic from 12 cents to 15 cents.
- In the Argentine magazine D’Artagnan, the series Gilgamesh the Immortal by Robin Wood and Lucho Olivera debuts, a sci-fi version of the Sumerian hero.

=== July ===
- July 10: The first chapter of the story Zagor Racconta (from the series Zagor) by Guido Nolitta and Gallieno Ferri, is published and reveals the origins of the hero.
- July 15: In Tintin, the first chapter of Michel Vaillant 's story 5 Filles dans la Course ! by Jean Graton is serialized.
- July 29 : In Tintin, the first chapter of the Ric Hochet story Les Spectres de la Nuit by André-Paul Duchâteau and Tibet is serialized.

=== August ===
- August 8: The first episode of Fujiko F. Fujio's Doraemon is published.
- August 12: The final episode of Alain Saint-Ogan's Zig et Puce (in the rebooted version by Greg) is published.
- Marvel Comics follows DC's lead and raises the price of its typical comic from 12 cents to 15 cents.
- The first issue of the Italian comics magazine Re di Picche is published in which Luciano Bottaro's Re di Picche makes his debut.
- In the 4th issue of Zap Comix Robert Crumb's controversial comic strip Joe Blow causes scandal over its tale of incest within the all-American family. The magazine is banned from many stores afterwards.

=== September ===
- September 6: The final issue of the British comics magazine TV Century 21 is published. It merges with Joe 90 on 27 September and will continue in this format until 25 September 1971.
- September 11: The first episode of Maurice Tillieux and Arthur Piroton's detective series Jess Long debuts in Spirou.
- The first issue of the comics magazine Vampirella is published, introducing Forrest J. Ackerman and Trina Robbins's character Vampirella.
- The first issue of the horror comics magazine Tower of Shadows is published.
- The final issue of Strange Suspense Stories is published.
- The Brave and the Bold #85, Artist Neal Adams updated Green Arrow's visual appearance by designing a new costume for the character in The Brave and the Bold #85 (August -September 1969).

=== October ===
- October 12: in Corriere dei Piccoli, the story Valentina Mela Verde (The Green Apple) by Grazia Nidasio is first serialized, a coming-of-age story about a girl from the Milan middle-class.
- October 13: The first episode of the controversial British satirical and erotic comic strip Varoomshka by John Kent is published.
- October 18: The first issue of the British comics magazine Whizzer and Chips is published. In its first issue Mike Lacey's Sid's Snake debuts, which will run until 2000. Another comic strip to make its debut is Terry Bave's Odd Ball.
- October 20: John Lennon releases his solo album Wedding Album, which features a self-drawn three-page comic strip inside the sleeve.
- October 25: In the second issue of Whizzer and Chips Mike Lacey's Shiner debuts, which will run until 1976.
- October 25 : In Pilote, the first chapter of the Valérian and Laureline story Empire of a Thousand Planets, by Pierre Christin and Jean-Claude Mézières is serialized, marking the first apparition of XB982, Valerian’s spaceship. In the same issue, the Lucky Luke story Western circus by Goscinny and Morris takes off.
- The final issue of the first run of Space Family Robinson is published. It will be rebooted in October 1973.
- The Marvel Comics reprint title Marvel Collectors' Item Classics, with issue #23, becomes Marvel's Greatest Comics.
- The first issue of the Italian comics series Vartan by Sandro Angiolini is published.
- In Sgt. Kirk, the story Gli scorpioni del deserto (The Desert's Scorpions), a war series by Hugo Pratt takes off.

=== November ===
- Warner Bros.-Seven Arts buys National Comics Publications (DC Comics).
- Dino Buzzati's graphic novel Poem Strip is published.
- The first issue of the Italian horror magazine Terror (Ediperiodici) is published.
- In Télé 7 Jours, the story La Langouste ne Passera Pas by Jean Yanne and Tito Topin is first serialized, the first episode of the parodic spy series Les Dossiers du BIDE.

=== December ===
- December 13: The final issue of the British girls' comics magazine Lady Penelope is published.
- December 16: In Tintin, the first chapter of the Bruno Brazil story Les Yeux sans Visage by Greg and William Vance is serialized.
- December 25: The first episode of Yvan Delporte, André Franquin, Raymond Macherot and Will's Isabelle is published.
- Metal Men, with issue #41 (December 1969/January 1970 cover-date), suspends publishing. (The title is revived in 1973 as a reprint book, then goes on hiatus until 1976.) (DC Comics).
- First issue of the magazine Horror (Gino Sansoni editore), dedicated to the Italian author comics of fantastic genre.

=== Specific date unknown ===
- The first episode of Charles Grigg's Splodge is published.
- Fat Freddy's Cat makes his debut in Gilbert Shelton's Fabulous Furry Freak Brothers.
- Jo Addams and Luis Roca's Scarth A.D. 2195 debuts as Scarth.
- Edwina Dumm’s Alec the Great comes to an end.
- The final episode of the newspaper comic Little Lulu is published.

== Births ==
=== November ===
- November 29: Greg Rucka, American comic book writer (DC Comics, Marvel Comics).

== Deaths ==
=== January ===
- January 7: Earl Duvall, American animator and comics artist (Bucky Bug, Silly Symphony comic strip), dies at age 70.

=== February ===
- February 2: Roger Melliès, French comics artist (Bill Bock et Kay, made comics about Biggles), dies at age 67.
- February 3: Al Taliaferro, American comics artist (Bucky Bug, Silly Symphony comic strip, Three Little Pigs comic strip, Donald Duck newspaper gag comic), dies at age 63.

=== March ===
- March 3: Bill Freyse, American comic artist (continued Our Boarding House), dies at age 70.
- March 20: Henri van de Velde, Dutch painter, illustrator, graphic artist and comics artist (Het Avontuur van Haverstok met den koffer van Verweegen en Kok), dies at age 73.

=== April ===
- April 16: Nils Larsson, Swedish illustrator and comics artist (Den Illa gör), dies at age 91.

=== May ===
- May 10: George Klein, American comics artist (Superman), dies from cirrhosis at age 53 or 54.
- May 18: Alfredo Adduard, Chilean comics artist and illustrator (Don Bilz), dies at age 69 or 70.
- May 25: Boy ten Hove / Barend ten Hove, Dutch caricaturist, advertising artist and comics artist (Kees Kogel, Piet en Puk), dies at age 60.

=== June ===
- June 3: Buriko, Italian comic artist (drew illegal Mickey Mouse comics), dies at an unknown age.
- June 24: Frank King, American comics writer and artist (Gasoline Alley), dies at age 86.

=== July ===
- July 5: Guillermo Divito, Argentine comics artist, illustrator, caricaturist and editor (Bombolo, Pochita Morfoni, El Doctor Merengue, Fulmine, Fallutelli, Divito Girls, founder of the magazine Rico Tipo), dies at age 54 in a car crash.
- July 17: Clayton Knight, American comics artist (Ace Drummond), dies at age 78.
- July 24: Ira Schnapp, Austrian-American graphic designer and comics letterer (designed logos for DC Comics), dies at age 74.

=== August ===
- August 2: Russell Stamm, American comics artist (Invisible Scarlet O'Neil), dies from a heart attack at age 53.
- August 20: Dudley D. Watkins, British comics artist (Oor Wullie, Desperate Dan, The Broons, Lord Snooty, Mickey the Monkey, Jack Flash, Biffo the Bear, Jimmy and his Magic Patch, Morgyn the Mighty), dies at age 62.
- August 25: Bjarne Restan, Norwegian illustrator and comics artist (Per og Peik i Sukkerlandet, Paal og Pelles Reise, Sjur Sjursen vil bli Kapitalist), dies at age 70.

=== September ===
- September 1:
  - Alex Blum, Hungarian-American comics artist (contributed to Classics Illustrated), dies at age 80.
  - Auguste Liquois, French comic artist (Coco de la Lune, comic adaptations of literary works), dies at age 67.
- September 25: Frans van Lamsweerde, aka Faun, Dutch comics artist, illustrator and animator (Pekky, Marco's Avonturen), dies at age 49.

=== October ===
- October 19: Mario Morelli di Popolo, Italian-Egyptian comics artist (Zouzou), dies at age 67 or 68.

=== November ===
- November 27: Cecilia May Gibbs, Australian children's book illustrator and comics artist (Bib and Bub, Tiggy Touchwood), dies at age 92.

=== Specific date unknown ===
- Ernst Akerbladh, Swedish illustrator and comics artist, dies at age 78 or 79.
- Javier Puerto Bagüeña, Spanish comics artist, dies at an unknown age.
- Tom Cottrell, aka S. Seymour, aka Jolly, British editorial cartoonist and comics artist (Paper Cap), dies at age 78 or 79.
- Dan Gordon, American animator, storyboard artist and comics artist (Real Life Comics, Better Publications, Western Publishing), dies at an unknown age.
- Barye Phillips, American illustrator and comics artist (comic strip of Huckleberry Finn), dies at age 44 or 45.
- Harris Steinbrook, aka Harris Steinberg, American comics artist (drew funny animal comics), dies at age 56 or 57.

== Exhibitions and shows ==
- May 20-June 15: Corcoran Gallery of Art (Washington, D.C.) — White Rain: The Phonus Balonus Show of Some Really Heavy Stuff, curated by Bhob Stewart for museum director Walter Hopps, includes work by R. Crumb, Gilbert Shelton, Vaughn Bodé, Kim Deitch, Jay Lynch and others
- October 28–November 22: Phoenix Gallery (Berkeley, California) — The New Comix, curated by gallery owner Si Lowinsky, featuring the Zap Comix collective (Robert Crumb, Gilbert Shelton, S. Clay Wilson, Victor Moscoso, and Rick Griffin); the gallery was brought up on obscenity charges because of the show

== Conventions ==
- Summer: Comicon '69 (British Comic Art Convention 2) (Waverley Hotel, London, England) — organized by Bram Stokes, Frank Dobson, and Steve Moore; guests include Steve Parkhouse and Barry Smith
- June 7–8: Triple Fan Fair (Howard Johnson's Downtown Motor Lodge, Detroit, Michigan) — guests include Edmond Hamilton, Leigh Brackett, Stan Lee, and Al Williamson
- June 20–22: Southwesterncon IV/ Houston Comic Book Convention (Ramada Inn, Houston, Texas)
- July 4–6: Comic Art Convention (Statler Hilton Hotel, New York City) — first official Comic Art Convention, produced by Phil Seuling; guest of honor: Hal Foster; other guests and attendees include Gil Kane, Roy Thomas, Gray Morrow, John Buscema, Al Williamson, Jeff Jones, Don McGregor, Richard Marschall; Al Milgrom, Alan Weiss, Angelo Torres, Archie Goodwin, Arvell Jones, Bill Devine, Bill Pearson, Bob Lewis, Carole Seuling, Dick Giordano, Gary Brown, Gary Groth, Gary Via, Greg Potter, Hal Foster, Irene Vartanoff, Jerry Bails, Joe Sinnott, John Fantucchio, John Verpoorten, Len Wein, Mark Hanerfeld, Martin Greim, Marv Wolfman, Mary Skrenes, Phil Seuling, Rich Buckler, Richard "Grass" Green, Sal Trapini, Tom Fagan, and Woody Gelman; attendees pay $3.50 for a three-day ticket, with daily passes at $1.50. Admittance free with a hotel room rental, which costs $15-and-up per day.
- November 1–3: Salone Internazionale dei Comics a.k.a. "Lucca 5" (Lucca, Italy)
- December 27: Miamicon

== Awards ==
=== Alley Awards ===
Presented July 1969 at the Comic Art Convention

Best Comic Magazine Section

- Best Adventure Title — Fantastic Four (Marvel Comics)
- Best Fantasy/SF/Supernatural Title - Doctor Strange (Marvel Comics)
- Best Western Title - Bat Lash (DC Comics)
- Best War Title - Star Spangled War Stories (DC Comics)
- Best Humor Title - Archie (Archie Comics)
- Best Romance Title - Young Love (DC Comics)
- Best Reprint Title - Marvel Super-Heroes (Marvel Comics)

Professional Work

- Best Editor - Dick Giordano (DC Comics)
- Best Writer - Roy Thomas
- Best Pencil Artist - Neal Adams
- Best Inking Artist - Tom Palmer
- Best Cover - Captain America #113, by Jim Steranko
- Best Full-Length Story - "...And Who Shall Mourn for Him?," by Stan Lee, John Buscema & Sal Buscema, The Silver Surfer #5 (Marvel Comics)
- Best Feature Story - "At the Stroke of Midnight," by Jim Steranko, Tower of Shadows #1 (Marvel Comics)
- Hall of Fame - "Deadman", by Neal Adams (DC Comics)

Special Awards

- Carmine Infantino, "who exemplifies the spirit of innovation and inventiveness in the field of comic art".
- Joe Kubert, "for the cinematic storytelling techniques and the exciting and dramatic style he has brought to the field of comic art".
- Neal Adams, "for the new perspective and dynamic vibrance he has brought to the field of comic art".

Popularity Poll

- Best Adventure Hero Strip - The Amazing Spider-Man (Marvel Comics)
- Best Adventure Group Strip - Fantastic Four (Marvel Comics)
- Best Supporting Character - Rick Jones (The Incredible Hulk, The Avengers, and Captain America) (Marvel Comics)
- Best Villain - Doctor Doom (Fantastic Four) (Marvel Comics)
- Strip Most Needing Improvement - Superman (DC Comics)

Newspaper Strip Section

- Best Adventure or Human Interest Strip - Prince Valiant, by Hal Foster
- Best Humor Strip or Panel - Peanuts, by Charles Schulz
- Hall of Fame - Tarzan, by Burne Hogarth

Fan Activity Section

- Best Limited Reproduction Fanzine - Newfangles by Don & Maggie Thompson
- Best Unlimited Reproduction Fanzine - The Comic Reader
- Best Fan Artist - John Fantucchio
- Best Comic Strip Writer - Mark Hanerfeld
- Best Fan Project - 1969 New York ComiCon

=== National Cartoonist Society Division Awards ===
- Newspaper Comic Strips Award (Humor) - Beetle Bailey, by Mort Walker
- Newspaper Comic Strips Award (Story) - The Heart of Juliet Jones, by Stan Drake
- Newspaper Panel Cartoons Award - They'll Do It Every Time, by Bob Dunn
- Gag Cartoons Award - George Wolfe
- Comic Books Award - Will Eisner
- Advertising and Illustration Award - Ronald Michaud
- Editorial Cartoons Award - Blaine
- Sports Cartoons Award - Bill Gallo
- Special Features Award - Brother Sebastian, by Chon Day
- Reuben Award - Smitty, by Walter Berndt

== First issues by title ==
=== DC Comics ===
Date with Debbi

Release: January /February Editor: Dick Giordano.

From Beyond the Unknown

Release: October Editor: Julius Schwartz.

The Phantom Stranger

Release: May–June. Editor: Joe Orlando.

The Witching Hour

Release: February /March : Editor: Joe Orlando.

=== Marvel Comics ===
Chamber of Darkness

Release: October. Editor: Stan Lee.

Tower of Shadows

Release: September Editor: Stan Lee.

=== Other publishers ===
Alan Ford

Release: by Max Bunker Press. Writer: Max Bunker. Artist: Magnus.

Archie's TV Laugh-Out

Release: December by Archie Comics.

Čtyřlístek

Release: May 15. Creator: Jaroslav Němeček

Everything's Archie

Release: May by Archie Comics.

Golden Comics Digest

Release: May by Gold Key Comics.

Gothic Blimp Works

Release: February 1 by the East Village Other. Editor: Vaughn Bodē

Poem Strip

Creator: Dino Buzzati

== Canceled titles ==
=== DC Comics ===
- Bat Lash, with issue #7 (October /November )
- Beware the Creeper, with issue #6 (March /April )
- Secret Six, with issue #7 (April /May)

=== Marvel Comics ===
- Not Brand Echh, with issue #13 (May)
- Doctor Strange, with issue #183 (November )

=== Other publishers ===
- T.H.U.N.D.E.R. Agents, with issue #20 (November )

== Initial appearance by character name ==
=== DC Comics ===
- Abel, in DC Special #4 (July)
- Jason Bard, in Detective Comics #392 (October)
- Black Canary (Dinah Lance), in Justice League of America #75 (November) — ret-con
- Mindgrabber Kid, in Justice League of America #70 (March)
- Nightmaster, in Showcase #82 (May)
- Superman (Earth-Two), in Justice League of America #73 (August)
- Tala, in Phantom Stranger #4 (November)
- Tim Trench, in Wonder Woman #179 (November)
- Bork in Brave and the Bold #81 (December)

=== Marvel Comics ===
- Controller, in Iron Man vol. 1, #12 (April)
- Digger, in Tower of Shadows #1 (September)
- Falcon, in Captain America #117 (September)
- Father Set, in Prince Namor, the Sub-Mariner #9 (January)
- Vanessa Fisk, in The Amazing Spider-Man #70 (March)
- Frankenstein's Monster, in Silver Surfer #7 (August)
- Galaxy Master, in The Incredible Hulk vol. 2 #111 (January)
- Glob, in The Incredible Hulk vol. 2, #121 (November)
- Grandmaster, in The Avengers #69 (October)
- Guardians of the Galaxy, in Marvel Super-Heroes #18 (January)
- Havok, in Uncanny X-Men #54 (March)
- Hyperion, in The Avengers #69 (October)
- Larry Trask, in Uncanny X-Men #57 (June)
- Living Monolith, in Uncanny X-Men #54 (March)
- Machinesmith (Starr Saxon), in Daredevil #49 (February)
- Man Mountain Marko, in The Amazing Spider-Man #73 (June)
- Man-Ape, in The Avengers #62 (March)
- Midas, in Iron Man #17 (September)
- Naga, in Prince Namor, the Sub-Mariner #9 (January)
- Nighthawk (Kyle Richmond), in The Avengers #69 (October)
- Prowler, in The Amazing Spider-Man #78 (November)
- Sauron, in Uncanny X-Men #60 (September)
- Savage Land Mutates in Uncanny X-Men #62 (November)
  - Lorelei, in Uncanny X-Men #63 (December)
- Silvermane, in The Amazing Spider-Man #73 (June)
- Doctor Spectrum, in The Avengers #69 (October)
- Stingray, in Prince Namor, the Sub-Mariner #19 (November)
- Super-Patriot, in Nick Fury, Agent of S.H.I.E.L.D. #13 (July)
- Titanium Man, in Tales of Suspense #69 (September)
- Undying Ones, in Doctor Strange #183 (November)
- Viper, in Captain America #110 (February)
- Whizzer II (James Sanders), in The Avengers #69 (October)
