= Sid Burgon =

British comics artist

Sidney William Burgon (3 October 1936 - 12 October 2023), better known as Sid Burgon, is a British comics artist. After working as a mechanic and drawing as a hobby he was encouraged by coworkers into furthering his artistic interests. He gave up his job in 1963 and became a freelance cartoonist with some of his early work being published The Weekly News under the pseudonym Swab. In 1970 Burgon began working for Fleetway drawing a number of strips including Bookworm for Whoopee!, Joker for Knockout and Ivor Lott and Tony Broke for Buster (comics). Burgon began to draw for DC Thomson in 1989 drawing a revival of Biffo the Bear in The Beano and Adrian the Barbarian for The Beezer (which was recently reprinted in The Beano as Olaff the Madlander). Burgon stopped drawing for DC Thomson in the late 1990s/early 2000s.
he died October 12th 2023 at the age of 87.

== Bibliography ==
=== Fleetway ===
- Bookworm
- Handy Andy
- Hit Kid
- Ivor Lott and Tony Broke
- Joker
- Lolly Pop
- Milly O'Naire & Penny Less
- Roy's toys
- School Funds
- The Little Monsters for Monster Fun

=== DC Thomson ===
- Adrian the Barbarian for The Beezer
- Biffo the Bear for The Beano
- Bully Beef and Chips for The Dandy
- Keyhole Kate for The Dandy
- Euro School for The Dandy
