= Olaff =

Olaff may refer to:

- Gene Olaff (1920–2017), American soccer goalkeeper
- Olaff the Madlander, a comic strip
