= Adrian the Barbarian =

Adrian the Barbarian may refer to:

- Olaff the Madlander, a comic strip initially published as Adrian the Barbarian
- Pope Adrian VI, given the moniker the "Barbarian From the North"; sometimes referred to by the Italian phrase pontefice barbaro, 'foreign pope'
