= Wow! (comic) =

British comics magazine

Issue 3 of Wow! comic

Wow! is a British comic book magazine running for 56 issues from 5 June 1982 to 25 June 1983, when it merged with Whoopee!.

== Comic strips ==
Adam and his Ants
A boy and his army of ants. Drawn by Sid Burgon. This was originally a comic strip from Cor!! comic, called 'Andy and his Ants'. Two issue of Wow! feature reprints of old Cor!! strips.
Barney's Badges
A boy whose jacket is covered in magical pin badges given to him by a jumble sale stallholder one morning. Drawn by Terry Bave
Bill and Coo
A boy and his pet pigeon. Drawn by Trevor Metcalfe. Although issue 56 was the last to regularly feature the characters, new stories were printed in the Wow Annual 1986 (printed and distributed in 1985) and the summer specials until 1985. In this last story we see Coo piloting a model plane for a competition.
Bleep!
A robot. Drawn by Jim Barker, survived merger with Whoopee
Boy Boss
A boy who owns a multimillion-dollar global enterprise. Drawn by Frank McDiarmid. Survived merger with Whoopee.
Country Cousin
A country lad who lives with his cousin's city family. Issue 56 was the last to regularly feature the characters. The last new story to feature 'Cuz' was the Wow summer specials 1985 when he tries to cure his cousin's hiccups using country remedies.
Creepy Comix
A boy named Davey Doom who buys the complete collection (13 issue run) of a horror comic 'Creepy Comix'. Drawn by Reg Parlett Issues 1 through 38. Drawn by Dick Millington (whose style is very similar) from issue 39 to 55. Then reverted to original artist Reg Parlett for merger. Survived merger with Whoopee. Then when Whoopee merged with Whizzer and Chips story's continued. Finally Whizzer and Chips merged with "Buster" comic where the story's continued until 1997 - making them the most successful of all Wow!'s comic characters.
Family Trees
A group of trees who are forever trying to find a home. Drawn by Robert Nixon. Survived merger with Whoopee.
The Goodies and the Baddies
Comic strip Reprinted stories originally called the 'Toffs and the Toughs' about two gangs of three children: the 'goodies' and the 'baddies'. Drawn by Reg Parlett.
Gulliver's Troubles
An incredibly tall boy. Drawn by Norman Mansbridge.
Here is the News
A selection of joke news stories. For example: "In Downing Street today, Mrs Thatcher had a long talk with her cabinet. She also spoke to her wardrobe and a chest of drawers." Survived merger with Whoopee.
Hi De Hi Hi De Hooooo
A haunted holiday camp.
Jake the Peg... with his extra leg!
Comic strip featuring Rolf Harris's three-legged character.
KBR - Kids Band Radio
A group of CB radio users. A jargon guide (Yak Yak KBR) appears at the end of each week's strip to explain technical terms. The strip also includes a fan club (KBR Korner) featuring fellow CB Radio fans. Survived merger with Whoopee.
Kid Comic
A boy who has a seemingly endless list of jokes at his disposal. Drawn by Martin Baxendale. Survived merger with Whoopee.
Ossie
An ostrich. Drawn by Robert Nixon. Survived merger with Whoopee.
Penny Dreadful
A mischievous girl. Penny's last new story was also in the Wow summer specials 1986 when she gets into trouble on a school outing. Reprinted in Whizzer and Chips in 1988 and 1989.
Shipwreck School
A group of children (and their teacher) who are stranded on a desert island, and frequently invent ways to alert a nearby ship. Drawn by Vic Neill. Survived merger with Whoopee. Later in Whoopee one of the pupils leaves school and becomes a policeman.
Spare-Part Kit
A boy called Kit Katz who has numerous false limbs affixed on him, giving him super strength. Drawn originally by Vic Neill, and later by Robert Nixon and Trevor Metcalfe. Survived merger with Whoopee.
Team Mates
A football team; the players are Glenn Doddle, Cyril Breeches, Clemence Ray, Kenny Dogleash, and Dora Dribble. Drawn by Tom Paterson. Survived merged with Whoopee. Reprinted in 'Big Comic Fortnightly' (1988) and 'BVC' comic (1995). New stories in Wow! Special 1985.
When 'e wus Young
Comic tales of famous characters' childhoods. Issue 3 featured Long John Silver. Drawn by Nigel Edwards.

== Other features ==
TV Quiz Kids
The puzzle page, featuring puzzles done in the style of game shows with slightly tweaked names, such as 'Bob Monkeyhouse's', 'Fortunate Families' (referencing Bob Monkhouse's Family Fortunes). Drawn by Jack Edward Oliver. Survived merger with Whoopee.
Wow! Presents a Creepy Comix Page
A spin-off of Creepy Comix, featuring a supposed strip from one of the issues. Some were recurring (such as "The Homeless Horrors" comic strip, "The I-Scream Van" and The Rock, about a rock which would carry a curse to all who touched it).
Wow! Star Turns
Combined jokes and puzzle feature. Contained reader-submitted jokes featuring celebrities. Survived merger with Whoopee after being renamed Comic Turns.
The Upper Crusts and the Lazy Loafers
Comic strip Reprints featuring Dumpy and Tich (the 'Lazy Loafers'), two tramps who repeatedly try and grab food from Crust Lodge. Drawn by Reg Parlett.
Rolf's Magic Brushes
Featuring Rolf Harris (issues 1-26).

== Specials and Annuals ==
Wow had 5 Specials printed and distributed in the summer of years 1983, 1984, 1985 (this was the last special to feature a high ratio of new comic strips to reprint stories), 1986 and 1987.

Wow had 3 annuals, cover dated 1984, 1985 and 1986.
