= Bobby's Girl =

Bobby's Girl may refer to:

- "Bobby's Girl" (song), a 1962 song performed by Marcie Blane, covered by many artists
- Bobby's Girl (album), a 1982 album by Aileen Quinn

== See also ==
- Bobby's Ghoul, a British comic strip
