= Lazybones =

Lazybones or Lazy Bones may refer to:

- Lazybones (song), a 1933 song by Johnny Mercer and Hoagy Carmichael
- Lazybones (1935 film), a British film directed by Michael Powell
- Lazybones (1925 film), a silent film directed by Frank Borzage
- Lazy Bones, a British comic strip which ran from 1978 to 1990
- Lazy Bones, a 1934 part-animation film by Fleischer Studios featuring Borrah Minevitch
- "Lazy Bones", a 1999 song by Brant Bjork from Jalamanta
- "Lazy Bones", a 2012 song by Green Day from ¡Dos!
