= Pursuit of the Puzzler =

Pursuit of the Puzzler was originally an adventure comic strip in the British comic Whizzer and Chips. It made its first appearance on 2 January 1971 and ran for 82 weeks concluding with the issue dated 29 July 1972. The Puzzler adventures were drawn by noted artist and illustrator Mike White.

== Concept ==
The strip was about the fictional Higson family who were trying to clear their dad's name from a crime that he did not commit. The villain of the story was 'the Puzzler' who set various challenges for the Higson children. Each challenge saw the children gain a piece of a jigsaw which would reveal the Puzzler's identity.

== Revenge of the Puzzler ==
Immediately after the conclusion of the original adventure a new strip, entitled Revenge of the Puzzler, began. In this story a series of five different villains (Mr Freeze, The Model Man, Dr Steel and The Terrible Twins) tried to exact revenge for the Puzzler on the Higson family. The story came to a rapid conclusion (episode 47 of the story on 23 June 1973) when several strips in Whizzer and Chips were concluded to make way for the following week's merger with another comic, Knockout.

== The Puzzler's Christmas Crime ==
In the middle of the run of 'Revenge of the Puzzler', The 1973 Whizzer and Chips Annual (published for Christmas 1972) saw the Puzzler escape from jail for a one off adventure.

== Beware of the Puzzler ==
A final outing for the character appeared in the 1974 Whizzer and Chips Annual (published for Christmas 1973).
