= Sweeny Toddler =

British comic strip

Sweeny Toddler (sometimes titled Help! It's Sweeny Toddler) was a British comic strip by Leo Baxendale, which originally appeared in the British magazines Shiver and Shake, Whoopee!, Whizzer and Chips and finally Buster between 1973 and 2000. It was a gag-a-day about a little mischievous toddler. The name is a play on Sweeney Todd.

== Concept ==
Originally drawn by Leo Baxendale, Sweeny was a two-year-old 'toddler from hell'. With his pet dog Henry, he caused havoc around town, the outcome of which would usually involve being caught by his parents and punished with the slipper. Tom Paterson took over from Baxendale quite early on, Paterson becoming easily the most famous and longest running artist to draw the strip.

== Publication history ==
The character first appeared in issue 1 of Shiver and Shake, dated 10 March 1973 in the "Shiver" section. Always a popular character, Sweeny survived Shiver and Shake's merger with Whoopee! in 1974. The early 1980s saw Graham Exton become the writer, and in 1984 (issue dated 7 April) Sweeny became the cover star of Whoopee! for a second time (after being replaced by Snack-Man for a short period). When Whoopee merged with Whizzer and Chips in 1985, the first merged issue featured Sweeny hijacking several of the pages asking when his strip was going to appear. When it finally appeared on the back page, he said that "Rotten ol' Ed will pay for this", managing to work his way back onto the cover from the next issue, and becoming a Whizz-Kid.

Before the demise of Whizzer and Chips, Tom Paterson left Fleetway in favour of DC Thomson. Graham Exton would take over artistic duties as well as writing.

Sweeny also managed to survive the merger with Buster in 1990. The strip was drawn by Jimmy Hansen and Tom Paterson. As with all strips by the end, around this time it became a reprint, and continued being so until the comic's last issue at the beginning of 2000. As with several other Buster strips, it was included on the last page of the final issue (How It All Ends), drawn by Jack Edward Oliver. Explaining what eventually happened to all these characters, Sweeny was seen saying that he now likes everyone, and that "me going to be nice to everyone from now on".

=== Rebellion revival ===
In 2021, Rebellion Publishing announced that they would be reviving Monster Fun, and that Sweeeny Toddler would be included in the new issues.

A Monster Fun Halloween Special issue ("Halloween Spooktacular") was published in October 2021, and a new Sweeny Toddler story ("Ghosties", with script and art by Tom Paterson) was included.
