= Sid's Snake =

Sid's Snake (also titled Sid and his Snake) was a comic strip in the British comic Whizzer and Chips. It first appeared in issue 1, dated 18 October 1969, and was originally drawn by Mike Lacey; Jimmy Hansen later took over.

The strip's simple premise featured Sid and his pet snake Slippy. Slippy had the ability to morph into various useful shapes. Sid was also the leader of the "Whizz-Kids" (characters who featured in the Whizzer section of the comic, as opposed to the "Chip-ites") and, bar the first issue (in which he appeared on the front cover of Chips, usually Shiner's job) he appeared on the front cover of the comic until the mid-1980s.

The strip survived the merger with Buster in 1990. Though the strip was no longer the leader of the Whizz-Kids, it still appeared in Buster until the comic's last issue at the beginning of 2000. As with all other strips that were still being published, it had by that time become a reprint.

In Germany, the strip was called Twinky & Twist and occupied the last page of Felix magazine in the second half of the 1970s.
