= Wonder Wellies =

British comic strip

Wonder Wellies was a British comic strip, first published on 17 September 1983 in the Buster comic and continued until August 1985. The artist was Dave Follows. The writer was Roy Davis.

== Concept ==
Willie's wellies were living Wellington boots, they could move and interact independently of Willie's feet. They could do anything Willie wanted them to do. They were very useful, and helped Willie out of all sorts of trouble.

Willie's Wellingtons were transformed from normal wellies to supper wellies by Professor Krankpot in an experimental accident. Artist Dave Follows drew the strip throughout its entire run. Wonder Wellies was a very popular strip, winning Cartoonist Club of Great Britain for most humorous comic strip of 1983.
