= Store Wars =

British comic strip

Store Wars was a comic strip that first appeared in the British comic Whizzer and Chips in 1981. It told the story of two shops on a high street: a large superstore owned by Mr. Superstore, and a small general store next door called Bloggs and Son. Despite Mr. Superstore's efforts to force Bloggs and Son to go out of business, each week, the little store triumphs. During its run it was drawn by Doug Jensen, Jim Watson and Jimmy Hansen.

The first story told the story of how all of the shops in a terrace of shops closed up, one by one, leaving Bloggs & Son General Store, a popular small corner shop that seemingly sold anything and everything, owned by Mr. Bloggs, a kindly old man wearing the traditional white coat, and his son Ted. Mr. Superstore, a bowler-hatted long-nosed man one day walked into Bloggs' shop and promptly decided to build a new superstore on the site of the demolished shops.

Each episode saw him try various nefarious methods to bring customers from the small shop to his store, but he would inevitably come to a sticky end.

One strip which was drawn by Jim Watson, rewrote the origins. Mr. Superstore brought a coachload of people in from a block of flats to visit the store - and then he showed them a postcard showing a terrace of houses adjacent to Bloggs' shop, whereupon the shoppers revealed themselves as the original inhabitants of the houses before he had them demolished and attacked him with their handbags - the last frame saw them all in Bloggs' shop, catching up.

Yet another saw Bloggs open 24 hours a day - and Mr. Bloggs introduced his twin brother in the last two frames, covering the night shift. Others saw Mr. Superstore trying to keep up with Mr. Bloggs changing displays in a matter of minutes, and failing dismally - Mr. Bloggs always had a display ready to go whatever the weather, together with whitewash to write on the windows.

After Whizzer and Chips merged with Buster, the strip was continued in that comic, ending in March 1994. From 1997, after a reader request, the strip returned to Buster, but were reprints of earlier stories as opposed to new material. This continued until the comic's last issue at the beginning of 2000.
