= Striker (comic) =

British comic strip

Publication information
- Publisher: The Sun newspaper, Striker and Nuts Magazine
- Schedule: Daily/Weekly
- Format: Ongoing
- Genre: Sport
- Publication date: November 11, 1985 - July 2019
- Main character(s): Nick Jarvis, Eric and Vanessa Openshaw,
- ISSN: 1741-4008

Creative team
- Created by: Pete Nash
- Written by: Pete Nash, Andy Walker, Steve McKenlay, Roger Tavener, Joe McCardle, Steve Duffy.
- Artist(s): Pete Nash, Manuel Benet, John Cooper, Simon Ravenhill, Jason Edwards, Juan Cabrera, Will Turner, Luca Bonomo, Joel Carpenter, Luis Guaragna, Richard Ortiz
- Editor: Steve McKenlay

Striker was a fictional British comic strip created by Pete Nash in 1985 and ran in various formats until its last issue was published in 2019. The strip first appeared in The Sun newspaper on November 11, 1985, and was published daily until August 2003 when the creator decided to launch the strip as a weekly independent comic book. However, the strip returned to The Sun during October 2005, after the comic book had published 87 issues and suffered financial problems. Over the four years the newspaper strip was published daily until the end of September 2009, when it transpired that Nash had served a years notice to bring the strip to a conclusion. However, Striker returned on January 26, 2010, as a full-page comic strip in the weekly UK lads magazine Nuts, where it was published as a weekly strip until October 2010. It subsequently went unpublished until January 7, 2013, when it started to be published in The Sun newspaper. Over the next three years it was published seven days a week, before it was announced that Striker would no longer be published in the paper after February 13, 2016. Later that year, it was announced that the strip would be brought back to the paper by popular demand, with matches shown live on the internet for the first time.

== Publication history ==
Striker was created during 1985 by Pete Nash, who had just become a design sub-editor on The Sun newspaper, where he was exposed to and took inspiration from the original artwork of strips like George and Lynne and Axa. As a result, he decided to create a newspaper cartoon strip and explored a number of ideas, before deciding on a football theme, as the only other strip was Roy of the Rovers, which he personally believed had become "tired and dated". Nash subsequently drew the first ten panels and despite the amateurish, overdrawn and messy look to them, he showed the strips to The Sun's managing editor at the time Kelvin MacKenzie. Kelvin subsequently asked Pete to show the strip to his deputy and managing editor, before the first newspaper strip was published on November 11, 1985. Over the next few years, the strip was published, in a pencil, brush and ink format in A3, before it was reduced in size by photocopier to the size it would appear in the paper. During August 1990, Striker started to be coloured in with Pantone markers, after being reduced to publication size. During 1994, as Striker approached its tenth year, Nash felt that the newspaper strip needed a "major update" with fresh faces and new characters. As a result, Nick left Thamesford FC and joined Warbury Warriors as their "Player-Manager" during July 1994, with the challenge of taking them from the conference to the Premiership in successive seasons.

During 1997, the author was looking at several demonstrations of computer programmes including Photoshop and Illustrator, as they could be used to colour Striker in a cleaner, simpler and more effective way than markers. He remarked to a demonstrator that "it was a shame [that], it couldn't instantly calculate perspectives", the demonstrator subsequently recommend that Nash looked at the 3D software packages. Three months later Nash sat down at his computer with a consultant and a copy of Lightwave and learned how to produce 3D-generated artwork. However, because this took up a lot of time, the author hired another John Cooper to draw Striker, until the strip was ready to be launched in 3D. Striker subsequently made its debut as the world's first 3D-generated cartoon strip on March 16, 1998, however, this proved to be a disaster as his retouching of the 3D images looked heavy and clumsy, and the images lacked the comic feel. The then editor of The Sun Stuart Higgins, did not like it and nor did most of his staff before the author decided to revert to 2D after three weeks. For the rest of the year, Striker was drawn in 2D by Cooper, while Nash worked with another writer on some of the stories. Towards the end of 1998, The Sun dubiously agreed to the authors request to publish Striker in 3D again, but this time the strip was expanded to be a double-deck strip. This time Nash "was reasonably happy" with the "overall look and composition" a lot better than during the previous attempt.

The new-look Striker, subsequently proved to be a turning point for the strip's success, as the Daily Mirror, Daily Express and the Daily Star tried to poach the comic strip. During June 1999, the author decided to set up his own company Striker 3D, and set about recruiting staff in order to improve Striker, while laying foundations for future projects like a website and a comic book. The Sun also liked the new-look strip and as a result decided to increase its size to a triple-deck strip, while commissioning Striker 3D to create 3D-graphics to illustrate its and the News of the World's news and feature articles. Striker's new look also made it commercially viable to attract corporate sponsorship and during 2001 Richard Branson’s Virgin Mobile became Striker's first sponsor. However, at around this time Nash's long-term relationship with The Sun started to deteriorate, as, in addition to the newspaper strip, the author wanted to publish a weekly comic that would feature Striker as a major part of its content. Over the next few months, The Sun and Nash had several issues that could not be resolved, which resulted in the author reluctantly giving a years notice, to terminate his contract with The Sun during August 2002. These issues included licensing issues, with The Sun trying to claim ownership of Striker and trademark the brand and characters without the authors knowledge.

On August 28, 2003, Nash published Britain's first weekly comic strip in twenty-five years, with a launch budget of around £300 thousand, after he had put his house firmly on the line. Striker's distributors originally projected that 39 thousand copies of the comic had been sold, however, it was later revealed that they made a mistake and they revised their estimate to 29 thousand. The author was disappointed by this, as it was considered to be only just over their break-even amount of 28 thousand copies being sold. Over the next few weeks, sales of the comic were consistent, which was considered to be mainly due to a promotion that WH Smiths, were running in conjunction with the comic. However, once this promotion came to an end, availability of the comic plummeted, with sales slowly starting to slide as a result and eventually slipped below the break-even mark. Over the next few months, Striker 3D held several meetings with wholesalers and retailers, who told them that they had a very good product, but needed to spend more money on promoting it. They also were inundated with phone calls from readers who were disappointed that they could not find Striker, and in turn, they inundated their distributors with phone calls and held several meetings with them.

During issue 34 that was published at the end of April 2004, the author announced that the comic might end during June as it was "chronically underfunded" and "cash-strapped". As a result of this, the author decided to convert Striker 3D into a public limited company, which eventually meant that Nash could sell shares in his company to the comics readers. Despite fears that they would not raise the minimum £300 thousand that they needed to survive, the share offer was successful as the raised around £200 thousand, while an advertising agency pledged another £100 thousand by agreeing to trade future invoices for shares. As a result, the future looked promising once again, with Striker 3D managing to cut their operating costs, while increasing the number of pages to 36 and adding a glossy cover to the comic. Over the next few months, the company moved into the black, while having meetings with potential investors who were impressed by Striker, but refused to invest as they could not understand why adults would want to buy such a comic. As a result of this and sales continuing to decline, Nash decided to accept that after 87 issues, Striker was not going to make it as a stand-alone publication, with the final comic published on May 12, 2005.

After the comic folded Nash was offered the chance to take Striker back to The Sun, on terms that he hoped would pave the way for a better relationship. As a result, the strip returned to the newspaper on October 3, 2005, where it replaced The Premier and was published six days a week for the next four years. However, the relationship did not improve over the years, with the newspaper not getting behind the strip as they said they would. During September 2009, fans of the newspaper strip started to ask where it was, after the strip had not been published in the newspaper. It subsequently transpired that Nash had served a year's notice to bring the strip to a conclusion, with the last strip appearing on September 18, 2009, as he had run out of ideas and wanted to pursue other avenues. The author subsequently received an email from the weekly lads magazine Nuts, which offered to adopt Striker and give it a new home. Striker was subsequently first published in the magazine on January 26, 2010, after Nuts had spent £500 thousand promoting the magazine, in a series of poster campaigns in football stadiums and adverts on Sky TV. However, due to the harsh economic climate, the magazine was not able to find a corporate sponsor for the strip, which meant that the income was not sufficient to cover the artwork and production costs. As a result, the author decided that it was not viable to continue producing the strip and served a months notice, that the final strip in Nuts would be published on October 5, 2010.

Striker subsequently went unpublished until January 2013, when it returned to The Sun where it replaced The Shadows comic strip and was published in the newspaper and on its website, every day for the next three years. During the opening months of 2016, the then editor of The Sun, Tony Gallagher decided to end the two surviving comic strips in the paper, Hagar and Striker. However, less than two weeks after The Sun had dropped Striker from the paper, the paper asked the author to bring Striker back following a protest from fans, but initially only offered space for 3 panels a day. According to Nash, they explained that the decision was taken as a result of cost-cutting measures caused by declining sales and advertising revenue, however, the author announced that he did not wish to place all of his eggs in their basket again. As a result, long negotiations ensued including with another unnamed newspaper, before Nash achieved a deal with The Sun, enabled him to explore the commercial opportunities for Striker outside of The Sun. However, the price for this non-exclusivity was a big drop in the income from The Sun for Striker, which the author commented wasn't enough to cover production costs.

The comic strip returned to the paper during August 2016, with a two-week catch up on previous events, before the new era kicked off on August 29, 2016, with daily motion comic videos of the episodes shown on both The Sun's and Striker's website as well as Striker's YouTube channel. During Christmas 2016, the author published the first of around fifteen books, which contained every strip from 1985 onwards. Nash subsequently decided to end the strip on a cliffhanger during May 2016 and ran a classic striker story, while asking for more money to produce the strip with from The Sun as he felt overworked. The Sun subsequently reaffirmed its commitment to the strip with a better page rate, but it still was not enough to cover production costs. However, when potential revenue from merchandise sales and other ventures was combined with the money from The Sun, Nash hoped that it would be the start of a successful, exciting and more independent era for Striker. The strip subsequently resumed in The Sun on July 31, 2017, and ran through until the following summer, when the author took another break and ran a classic striker story in the paper and online.

During November 2017, Nash outlined plans for a new weekly comic publication which would utilise crowdfunding and feature both Striker as well as Psycops. He stated that there were 4 main problems with the previous weekly comic publication, which were that the overheads were too high, they couldn't afford to advertise, they were trying to please people of all ages and that it was too Striker-specific. He went on to state that the comic would be less focused on Striker, that they could advertise from the strip in The Sun, that the overheads would be far lower and that adults would be their target audience. Fans generally welcomed the idea and the author subsequently launched a Kickstarter during April 2018, where he asked to raise at least £35 thousand and offered various rewards including a 12-week subscription. Striker subsequently exceeded their target and raised over £43 thousand, which was then used to launch the comic during September 2018.

== Major characters ==
=== Nick Jarvis ===
Over the years, the strip has mainly revolved around the life of striker Nick Jarvis, who originally played for Oakvale, before moving to Thamesford during 1986. Over the next five years he played regularly for Thamesford, before he briefly moved to the Italian club A.C. Tornado, during the 1991 story Burnout. However, Nick returned to Thamesford at the end of that story as the club was wound up and ceased to exist. During the following year, Nick became the chairman of Thamesford, after he brought a house which the owner had just inherited from his father. Over the next two years ... During May 1994, after Thamesford had won the FA Cup, Nick decided to give away all of his shares in Thamesford to the season ticket holders in order to continue playing in the Premier League. However, he struggled to find another club and that managers felt intimidated by him because he used to be the chairman at Thamesford and was scared of him stamping his authority on them. As a result, the only club that was interested in him was the non-league conference side: Warbury Warriors. Jarvis subsequently becomes their player-manager, before he became fed up with Eric Openshaw's penny-pinching antics that he quits and returns to Thamesford during 1997. However, Jarvis returned to Warbury later that year and got them promoted to Division 1, after Eric was confronted by the fans and players. Over the next few years, Warbury win promotion to the Premier League, before they are relegated from it during 2002. After they were relegated Jarvis quits in order to end his playing career with Northern Spirit in Australia before he had his leg chopped off by a shark while surfing of Bondi Beach.

=== Eric and Vanessa Openshaw ===
Eric Openshaw is currently the Warbury Warrior's chief executive. He originally brought Warbury Warriors during 1994 for £300 000, when they were struggling in the Vauxhall Conference League and had hoped to sell it on after securing a ground improvement grant from the Football league. As a result of a bet with Cyril Rawlings, Eric found himself tied to the club for longer than he envisaged. The bet was that if Warbury were promoted to the Premier League in successive seasons, Eric would win Rawlings’ supermarket chain. However, if they failed, Rawlings would get Warbury's Gasworks Road ground and turn it into a commercial development. After several twists and turns including a murder attempt by a hitman in a clown mask and an arson attack at the football ground, he managed to hold on to the club. Eric was forced to sell the factory to raise money for the club's second stadium in 1997. Eric has a strong northern accent. He often seems like a buffoon. Openshaw is tight with his money, and argues with Jarvis over his unwillingness to pay for players. He questioned his son Todd's paternity; after discovering his true parentage, he attempted to divorce his wife Vanessa and met a woman his own age, Doris, though quickly took Vanessa back due to Doris's voracious sexual appetite. After spending three years out of the game, he attempted to buy back Warbury in 2013, before Li Ming outbid him and rehired Eric in his former Chief Executive role.

Vanessa Openshaw is Eric's wife. She has cheated on him with Nick and most of the team, making little secret of the fact that she married Eric for his money. As a result of a liaison with Nick, she conceived a son, Todd. She told Eric that he was the father, although the baby shared neither Vanessa's nor his hair colour and their sex life was almost nil. Eventually, Eric discovered the truth, leading to their marriage temporarily breaking down. Despite still being married to Eric, and Nick being in a relationship with Li Ming, Vanessa makes little secret of the fact that Nick is the man she truly desires.

=== Li Ming Wong ===
Li Ming Wong is the owner of Warbury Warriors, in her second spell in the role, having originally brought it from Eric Openshaw in 2006, and then Sheikh Mustapha Futti Khalub in 2013. After an attempt on her life by her brother a few months after buying the club, she spent the next two years mostly running her late father's businesses but returned to the club to take an active role during the season which saw them win the European Cup. She attempted to bankrupt the club following the breakdown of her relationship with Nick, though she re-purchased the club four years later and the two rekindled their romance, despite Nick still not entirely trusting her. She was killed in an explosion on her yacht while on honeymoon with Nick whom she married days earlier.

=== Dave Boreham ===
Dave Boreham is Kurt's former assistant, having served in that role under Nick for many years. He had an undistinguished playing career, the highlight of which was nearly winning promotion to Division Two with Newport County in 1983. Dave has managed the team on a few occasions, including in 2002–2003 when Nick quit and again when Nick was jailed for Gary Lewis' apparent murder in 2005. Dave has a beautiful daughter named Alex, who worked as a lap dancer. He is now the manager of the Welsh team, Brecknock Dragons, who play in the World League.

=== Scrapper Griswell ===
Scrapper Griswell plays defence. He had anger-management problems, and was a target for opposing players (despite his great stature). He has had two stints in prison: one when he was falsely accused of rape, and another when he broke into the office of the club's owners in 2002 to find out what their plans for the club were. His wife is Bertha, a stewardess at the club and a bog snorkelling champion. Their wedding ended in disaster when a flood forced their guests to swim to safety. After selling Warbury in 2009 he became a multi-millionaire, only to be swindled out of his fortune by a corrupt investment banker, forcing him to return to the club in 2013. In 2015, he retired, and is now the club's defense coach.

=== Callum Angelo ===
Callum Angelo is one of the team's main forwards. He had a troubled life due to his poor background (his mother, Donna, worked as a dominatrix in order to make ends meet, and continues to do so despite Callum's sizable income providing her with a comfortable lifestyle), but is one of the team's best players. Callum and Scrapper were sent to prison for breaking into the office of the club's owners in late 2002 to find evidence of suspicious goings-on. He was briefly set to transfer to Newcastle in 2004, but was stabbed by Chuck Rivers' former drug dealers and the transfer was called off while he recovered. He eventually moved to the Tyneside club, implicitly leaving Warbury in protest of Nick's dismissal by the Sheikh, but agreed to return to the club in 2013 out of loyalty to Nick.

=== Fabian de Guisson ===
Fabian de Guisson is the side's other main forward. He joined from Paris St. Germain for £500,000 during Warbury's first Premiership season. He regards himself as too good for the club, and constantly talks of moving to a bigger team. He has a son, Romeo, from a one-night stand. He considered giving Romeo up for adoption, but changed his mind upon discovering that Romeo was a good footballer. In March 2007, Fabian's sexual-assault case brought by Celia Montgomery was dismissed when Fabian's lawyer lied about his mental condition. Fabian spent time in a mental hospital, where he argued with the patients and had sex with a doctor he thought was his; his real doctor diagnosed him with a severe case of narcissism. During the strip's hiatus he moved to LA Galaxy, though fled the country after a scandal in which he unknowingly took in a teenage runaway, and returned to Warbury on a cut-price contract. Fabian's trademark goal celebration is 'The Peacock Strut', which both the opposition and his own teammates see as him showing off and being arrogant, this celebration is particularly used after he has scored a solo effort or wonder goal. His son Romeo has also used this celebration. He eventually had to retire for medical reasons, and is now the attacking coach.

== Plot ==
The strip has followed the adventures of its hero Nick Jarvis from his debut as a 20-year-old footballer to his present-day role as the billionaire owner of fictitious football club Warbury Warriors. When the strip started Nick was an apprentice engineer and an amateur footballer playing for his home team, the non-league side Oakvale, who had just been drawn against Manchester United in the third round of the FA Cup. Oakville were subsequently well beaten in this match, however, Jarvis played well and was spotted by Jim Cassidy and Alex McCabe, who were the manager and chairman of the fictional Thamesford Football Club. Cassidy and McCabe subsequently approached Jarvis to play on a trial basis for Thamesford, however, he initially rejected this offer, but later changed his mind and played against Ashton. After impressing in his trial match, he signed for Thamesford on a permanent basis, however, he soon found himself facing a charge of having sex with an under aged girl. At his subsequent trial, Jarvis was found not guilty after the prosecution's witness was star struck and found not to be able to distinguish between the fact and fantasy.

Thamesford subsequently celebrated their 50th anniversary by touring Mexico during the 1986 World Cup, where Nick was kidnapped after his teammate Gary Lewis claimed that he was Thamesford's most valuable player. The kidnappers subsequently asked McCabe for half of Jarvis reported value of £900 thousand. McCabe initially refused to negotiate with the kidnappers, but was told that he would need to look for a whole new team and manager if he didn't pay the ransom. As a result, McCabe paid the ransom to one of the kidnappers, who told McCabe that Jarvis would be freed if he got back to his fellow kidnappers within two hours. However, he was subsequently killed in a landslide, before he got back to his fellow kidnappers. As a result, his fellow kidnapper was about to harm Jarvis, before he managed to escape with the kidnapper's sister to the nearest town. Jarvis was subsequently approached to play in the village's annual football game, where he scored a couple of goals before they gave him a lift back to the team's hotel. He then had a holiday in Acapulco with his girlfriend, before flying back to England for the player of the year awards and pre-season training.

Lewis subsequently turned up with an ex-girlfriend of Jarvis's to the player of the year awards, where he got drunk and attempted to drive them both home. On the way home, a cat ran out in the middle of the road and caused Lewis to crash the car, however, thinking that she was dead and fearing being done for manslaughter, he swapped places with her. His girlfriend subsequently regained consciousness but had amnesia and could not remember what had happened. As a result, she was charged with careless driving as well as being drunk in charge of a car. Jarvis quickly realised that Lewis had framed his ex, however, Lewis denied this and fell out with Jarvis on the pitch and were both fined £400. Jarvis was subsequently placed on the transfer list by Cassidy at his own request, before he realised how he could prove that Lewis had framed her. After proving it, Jarvis spoke to McCabe and Cassidy and told them what had happened, McCabe subsequently tried to take a business approach by selling Lewis while bribing Jarvis and his ex-girlfriend. However, the local sports reporter had a tip-off from Hazel's flatmate and ran a story about it, before Lewis was arrested and found guilty of Perverting the course of justice. Jarvis subsequently came off the transfer list and scored against Liverpool, while McCabe had a heart attack during the game, before he died of lung cancer and advanced heart disease. McCabe's widower subsequently sold the club to a gangster called Eddie Carlton for £11 million, who becomes the chairman of Thamesford. Jarvis meets Carlton in a nightclub after he had been chatted up by the chairman's lover: Angel, before he is carpeted by him after the next game.

Thamesford is subsequently drawn against Oakvale away in the FA Cup before the players are invited to a Christmas party at Carlton's home. Angel subsequently blackmails Jarvis into having sex at the party and later into being her stud, after he discovers Carlton's secret plans to turn Thameford's stadium into a leisure centre and housing. Jarvis subsequently tips the press off about the development, which forces Carlton to hold a press conference, where he confirms the plans but denies reports that he doesn't care about the club. Carlton also ordered his minder to start a witch hunt in order to find out who tipped off the press, before he reads about Oakville having odds of 100–1 against beating Thamesford in the FA Cup and bets £5000 on his team to lose. Carlton then walks into the changing room on the day of the game and offers the players, a spiked glass of champagne and a chance to bury the hatchet with a pre-match toast "to an easy win today and more victories in 1987". After the game, Thamesford's fans were furious with the players and accused them of being bribed to throw the match as they lost 2–1 to Oakville. Carlton's minder subsequently discovered that Angel had been seeing Jarvis behind the chairman's back and reported back to his boss, who assumed that she had told Jarvis everything. Carlton subsequently confronted her and is about to throw her out on the streets, before he realises that she knows enough about him to be a threat to him. As a result, his minder locks Angel in a bedroom, while his boss decided what to do with her and Jarvis, however, she flees to Jarvis flat. After knocking them both unconscious and carrying them into the bedroom, Carlton's minder subsequently burnt the flat down, by placing a lit match into a wastepaper basket in an attempt to kill them both. However, Jarvis wakes up in time and manages to save them both by throwing Angel, out of the bedroom window, before jumping out after her. Carlton's minder subsequently informs his boss about the fire, who implements a contingency plan and does a runner to Brazil, before his minder is arrested. After the truth came out about the Oakville match, the fans got behind the team again, while Angel wanted to settle down with Jarvis who refused to get involved with her.

=== Story overview ===
Over the next few years plot lines included Jarvis being framed for drug possession; a club chairman from America fleeing a guilt-ridden past; helping a Russian player and his wife defect to the West; and getting involved with a juvenile delinquent with promising football skills and an abusive father. Jarvis was even called up for the 1990 World Cup but went missing and was forced to marry the pregnant daughter of a mob boss.

Arthur Crampton was Thamesford's fourth chairman since 1986, who died in his sleep shortly after Thamesford had won the UEFA Cup. His son Rodney Crampton who had gambling debts subsequently inherited his 51% stake in the football club, as well as his house Crampton Manor. He was free to sell any part of his father assets, including players from the football team, except for Crampton Manor which had been his ancestral home. After taking over as chairman, Crampton decided to review each employees file, put up ticket prices and sell five million pounds worth of talent. However, the latter did not go down well with the players who went on strike briefly, before Jarvis suggested that the entire first team resigned. As a result of this Crampton offered Jarvis, the chance to purchase Crampton Manor for tenth of its value, as compensation for breaching his contract and selling him.

After attempting to murder Nick, the chairman drained the club's bank accounts and nearly bankrupted it, before fleeing the country. Nick sold the property to pay some of the club's debts, but a disgruntled former director of the club persuaded their bank to initiate bankruptcy procedures. Nick and Cassidy were forced to sell every player except Nick and a few younger players, filling out the squad from cheap (or free) transfers from lower-league clubs.

During May 1994, after Thamesford had won the FA Cup, Nick decided to give away all of his shares in Thamesford to the season ticket holders in order to continue playing in the Premier League. However, he struggled to find another club and that managers felt intimated by him because he used to be the chairman at Thamesford and was scared of him stamping his authority on them. As a result, the only club that was interested in him was the non-league conference side: Warbury Warriors.

=== Warbury era ===
Jarvis joined the Warbury Warriors as player-manager, under a brief from chairman Eric Openshaw to get the side to the Premier League by 1998 (which would have meant getting promotion every year afterwards). Openshaw had a bet with the owner of a supermarket chain that he could do this; if Warbury failed, he would bankrupt the club and hand their ground over to his rival. Openshaw was nearly successful, since the side lost the 1998 Division One play-off final. By that time it was irrelevant; a former player burned the stadium down the previous year, invalidating the bet.

Warbury reached the Premiership the following year, struggling before finding their feet in their second season. Openshaw's refusal to spend money on extra players took its toll during their third season, and the side was relegated. Toward the end of that season, two corrupt businessmen (Charles Bullion-Browne and Jeremy Grubbet) purchased Warbury to close the club down, since they only wanted the land Gasworks Road stadium sat on. Jarvis was forced out, and the club went briefly out of business. Their plan eventually failed when it was discovered that a 1-foot-wide (0.30 m) "ransom strip" around the whole ground was owned by an old lady named Ethel, who would not give permission for the ground to be used for anything other than sport. Without the stadium, they lost interest in their acquisition and sold it back to Openshaw. Jarvis played for an Australian club until his leg was severed in a shark attack. Although his leg was reattached, his playing days were over. He returned to Warbury near the end of the season, but since the players were out of condition, the training facilities dilapidated, and the club having forfeited any points from the matches they didn't play, they were again relegated.

In Division Two the side won promotion easily, but the season was marred by two events. Openshaw's wife Vanessa was kidnapped by a gang who forced the club to lose 9–0 to Manchester United in a League Cup match. The criminals' ineptitude made it easy for the police to catch them, however, and the result was voided (although United won the rematch). Due to injuries to their main goalkeepers Jarvis signed an American goalkeeper, Chuck Rivers. Rivers suffered from depression and abused drugs; he committed suicide after some of his former drug dealers nearly killed one of his teammates.

In the Championship (the former Division One), Openshaw sold part of the club to a Russian gangster known as Boris Anokov. Gary Lewis (now managing a nearby pub) hatched a new plot: he would fake his own death at Jarvis' hands and claim the insurance money. Anokov found Lewis useful; he made him turn the pub into a brothel, giving Lewis the money to buy the pub and transfer it to Boris. Lewis never bought the pub, fleeing to the Cayman Islands with Boris' money. Jarvis was nearly convicted for the murder, but Lewis eventually confessed to the crime (after Anokov was killed by a rival gangster) and was imprisoned.

After a poor start to the 2005–06 season (and being refused permission to sign Joe Rock, a player from The Premier), Jarvis attempted to resign and become manager of Portsmouth. However, Openshaw recorded an insulting phone call made by Jarvis, edited it and replayed it to Portsmouth chairman Milan Mandarić; Jarvis seemed to be turning down the job offer and insulting Mandaric. A Chinese businesswoman (Li Ming) bought the club to turn them into the country's top side, and Openshaw remained in charge. Desperate to receive a £10 million payout promised by Li if Warbury was promoted to the Premiership, Openshaw convinced Jarvis to sign Ramiro Alvarez (a player from Juventus). Alvarez, however, spoke no English, played badly and went AWOL when Jarvis refused to play him in the first team (as promised by Openshaw). Alvarez' high salary caused unrest between Jarvis and the players. Li Ming was unhappy with her investment, telling Jarvis he would be fired if Warbury failed to reach the Premiership at the end of the season.

As the season continued, Jarvis and Li Ming began to fall in love, and during a session of martial arts they decided to pursue a relationship. When Openshaw vanished under mysterious circumstances, Vanessa discovered that he arranged a DNA test for his son Todd which had proven he was not the boy's father (Jarvis was). Meanwhile, Warbury won the play-off final and would be returning to the Premiership after a four-year absence. Li Ming's father discovered her relationship with Jarvis, and demanded its end. Her rivalry with Vanessa for Jarvis' affections led her to fire him.

Openshaw returned several weeks after he disappeared; he had gone hiking to Devon to clear his head after finding out about Todd's lineage. He then walked the moors for some time, before being bitten by a snake (and claiming it was an adder, though he suffered no ill-effects from the bite). Looking for help, he found a pub run by a woman called Doris. Eric and Doris fell in love; when they returned to Warbury, Eric told Vanessa he would divorce her and marry Doris.

Li Ming was unable to find a new manager, as none of the candidates (including Sven-Göran Eriksson) were suitable. She rehired Nick, telling him she did not want to restart their relationship. When she informed her father she would not be handing over control of the club to her brother, her father slapped her and told his daughter that he would cut off her trust fund. With the club in dire straits (and favourites for relegation at the end of the season), Li Ming found herself under pressure to raise money to buy new players. With the transfer window about to close until January, Li Ming secured an investment fund to buy players; the conditions were that she was only given a limited selection of players to choose from and if they were sold, the fund would take most of the profits.

Due to bad blood between Li Ming and her father, the Warbury chairwoman was attacked in the Warbury club car park and then kidnapped. Li's captors demanded a £2 million ransom from Li's father. As Li's father and brother finally reached the hideout, Li was escaping. She heard a shot and ran outside, to see her father lying motionless on the floor. Her brother, Chan, told her the captors had shot him; he then turned the gun on Li, saying he had to kill her because their father favoured Li . Li tried to reason with Chan; their father woke up and distracted him, and he dropped the gun. However, after punching Li Chan grabbed the gun. About to shoot, he slipped, fell down a well and died. Li's father then told her he was sorry for trying to control her decisions and left everything to her.

Warbury managed to scramble to mid-table with a late run of good results, before they achieved their highest-ever finish of fourth place in the 2007–08 season, entering the UEFA Champions League for the first time in their history. Despite mediocre league form in the 2008–09 season (mostly due to club captain Kurt Panzer suffering mental health problems caused by his being blackmailed by a German couple whose son he had unwittingly killed in his youth), Warbury progressed through to the Champions League final, where they were victorious.

Amid the backdrop of Warbury's European adventure, Nick and Li Ming had begun a relationship and by the summer of 2009 had agreed to get married. However, Li Ming announced at a formal dinner (without consulting him beforehand) that Nick would leave his job as Warbury manager to become manager of the Chinese national team. Nick was so outraged by this action that he ended his relationship with Li Ming, who in turn withdrew her financial support for Warbury and attempted to have the club bankrupted. She eventually sold the now almost-worthless club to star French player Fabian De Guisson, who in turn sold it on to dunce defender Scrapper Griswell. Just as it looked like Scrapper had bought a dud, a saviour appeared at the last minute in the guise of Sheikh Mustapha Futti Khalub.

Li Ming Wong kidnapping

When Li Ming took over at Warbury, her father was unhappy about it. When Li began a relationship with Jarvis, her father ordered her to end it and fire him. She did, but eventually gave him his job back. During summer 2006, her father visited Li at Gasworks Road with her brother Chan. Li was attacked by thugs in the car park but fought them off, believing the attack to be orchestrated by her father. A short time later, Li was attacked by the same thugs at her house and kidnapped. The kidnappers demanded £2 million from Li's father. Li's father and brother went to the place where Li was being held with the ransom. Meanwhile, Li hatched a plan to escape from where she was being held. As Li's father and brother arrived she killed one of the three kidnappers, escaped and knocked the remaining two kidnappers out. She heard a single gunshot, and raced up to find her father lying on the ground. She turned to Chan for help, only to see that he was pointing the gun at her. Chan revealed he had shot their father and would do the same to her, as he was sick of being made to feel worthless by them both. Li pleaded with him; as he prepared to shoot, their father distracted him by calling out. Li kicked the gun out of her brothers hand; when Chan recovered his gun and prepared to shoot again, he stumbled and fell 150 ft down an unused mine shaft to his death. Li made peace with her dying father, who left his £15 billion fortune to her.

Scrapper and Bertha's wedding

During summer 2006, Scrapper Griswell married his girlfriend Bertha. Since Bertha was a champion bog snorkeller, the wedding was held at a peat bog in Wales where the annual bog-snorkelling tournament took place. Rufus's Uncle Luis provided music and entertainment for the wedding. During the reception Fabian first made advances towards Vanessa Openshaw, taking her outside to a portable toilet for some privacy. However, Fabian's nanny Mona discovered what they were up to, and pushed the portable toilet over. Meanwhile, due to Scrapper's negligence the party was disrupted by a flood and the guests had to swim to safety through the bog. Fabian and Vanessa's portable toilet drifted out into open water; they were airlifted to safety, with a news report suggesting they used the toilet as a makeshift boat.

Fabian in court

During February 2007 Fabian de Guisson began attending relationship counselling with his partner Vanessa Openshaw, with both claiming the other was cheating on them. The counsellor, Celia Montgomery, decided to see them both separately. At their first session, Fabian made advances towards her, Soon after, Fabian was signing copies of his autobiography Je Suis Magnifique at a Warbury bookshop, when he saw Montgomery. He asked her whether she would be pressing charges. As she struggled to get away, her dress caught in the door and came off, leaving her in her underwear in the street. Fabian ended up in court, accused of sexual harassment. The case went badly, however, Fabian's lawyer lied that he had acted because of a mental condition. As a result, Fabian was sent to a mental hospital. There, he made a plan to seduce his doctor so that she would sign his release papers. However, after he had sex with the wrong doctor his real doctor arrived, diagnosing him with narcissism.

Los Angeles trip

In summer 2007, Li Ming Wong organised a tournament in Los Angeles. A few days into the trip, Jarvis arranged for him, Eric, Scrapper, Gerald, Fabian, Phil and Callum to have a plane tour of the Grand Canyon. However, plane trouble soon forced the pilots to crash-land in the water. Scrapper took the others on a raft to go for help. However, the strong current blew the raft off course, leaving the five in the raft in danger and Jarvis and the two pilots stranded. With a flare gun and a rope from the cockpit, Nick and the pilots were able to pull themselves to safety. The players' raft went down a waterfall, leaving the five stranded in a clearing. Scrapper and Callum went to find food, as Gerald told Eric, Fabian and Phil the legend of Bigfoot. The anxious players hear a gunshot from the woods. Three hillbillies emerge and engage in conversation with the players before Scrapper returns with Callum, attacks the hillbillies and escapes with the rest of the team. They find refuge in a cave, and Scrapper volunteers to search for the nearest town. When the others awaken, they find a large, gorilla-like monster standing at the cave's entrance. Gerald screams, only for the "monster" to pull off its fake head and reveal itself as Scrapper. The hillbillies, he explained, wanted him to wear this costume to bring back tourists and make people think a Bigfoot-type creature lived there. Openshaw wanted to leave, and looked for Scrapper. When he sees a gorilla-type monster searching through a bin and calls it, Scrapper asked why he was shouting. They turned to see the real monster, and ran for their lives.

Jim Sykes

Ewan Merenghi's agent, Jim Sykes, arrived early one season. Ewan's wife Cindy wished to be his agent and talked to Sykes about doing so. Sykes rejected Cindy's offer, but the two met at a hotel later on with Cindy attempting to bribe Sykes into accepting. During an investigation by the FA, it was discovered that Openshaw bribed Sykes during Merenghi's signing. Openshaw met Sykes and asked him for help, which Sykes refused. Openshaw went to church to pray for a way out; soon after, Sykes was found dead in his apartment from a gunshot wound to the head. Openshaw was arrested and questioned; his lack of an alibi and clear motive made him the prime suspect. Kyle Banner (Cindy Merenghi's ex-boyfriend), it turned out, killed Sykes to keep him from warning Merenghi about Banner.

Story's conclusion in 2009

During the 2009 preseason Warbury toured China, during which Jarvis and Li Ming planned to marry. During a banquet, Li Ming informed the guests that she had arranged for Jarvis to become manager of China's national team so they could win the World Cup. Angry at not being consulted, Jarvis turned down the job offer. The wedding was called off, with Li Ming vowing revenge. She sold the club to Fabian, who thought he had a bargain until Jarvis and Openshaw told him the club no longer had a stadium or any players; instead, they had a points deduction for going into bankruptcy and failing to provide a team. The only asset the club had was a piece of farmland which could only be developed as a football stadium. Fabian sold the land to Scrapper, who thought he could use it for housing since Fabian did not disclose the football-stadium provision. As Scrapper and his wife surveyed their seemingly-worthless land, a wealthy sheik offered to buy it.

At this point, Striker parted company with The Sun a second time, and the story was continued in weekly magazine Nuts. The Sheikh bought the bankrupt club from Scraper and with Eric's help was able to persuade the Premier League not to expel them. Despite the heavy points deductions imposed on the club, Nick was able to steer them to Premier League survival on the last day, only for he and Eric to be sacked days later for not being high-profile enough for the Sheikh's liking. After a nine-month run in Nuts, Striker went on hiatus for two-and-a-half years.

During January 2013 when the strip returned to The Sun for a second time, it was revealed that Warbury had suffered successive relegations and were now playing in League One. It was also revealed that they had been threatened with bankruptcy and expulsion from the Football League due to an unpaid tax bill.

Nick and Eric had both retired from football in the meantime, with the former having become a television pundit (a job which he quickly lost after repeatedly staring at his female co-host's legs). It subsequently turned out that the Sheikh's kingdom had fallen into a financial crisis, and in order to raise enough money to prevent it from being annexed by the United Arab Emirates, he sold the club back to Li Ming, who had since come to regret her actions in attempting to destroy the club four years previously, and quickly moved to re-hire Nick and Eric. Taking over a poor team which had been assembled by the Sheikh and a succession of intervening managers, Nick managed to haul them up from an unimpressive mid-table spot to promotion via the play-offs, during which time he temporarily came out of retirement due to the team's strikers being injured, inexperienced or talentless. In the summer, he began reassembling part of his old squad for the campaign in the Championship. In the meantime, Li Ming's presence in China became increasingly consistent, dealing with her late-father's businesses. During this time, she developed an acquaintance with Zhu Fang, a senior Chinese Communist Party official. Over time, Zhu Fang's intentions became more evident, with him revealing he wished to construct a factory in Warbury, making electronics/weaponry for the Chinese government, taking advantage of Li Ming's strong financial presence back in the United Kingdom. She soon became guilt-ridden with the plan and backed out, cutting all ties with Fang. Soon after, Fang planted a weighted bomb in Li Ming's office in the Gasworks Road Stadium. Bomb Disposal units deemed it a fake. Whilst back in China, Zhu Fang's plans were revealed to his peers, he was prosecuted and sentenced to death, his political position terminated immediately. The club excelled into the Premiership under Jarvis's leadership, with him continuing this success until Autumn 2014; when he and Li Ming, his then wife, began their honeymoon. A few days into the event, an explosion occurred, killing Li Ming. Nick was not present in the yacht at the time. It was revealed that the now-deceased Zhu Fang had a bomb placed in the yacht, fulfilling his death wish for revenge, stating the last was "merely to scare her". An unnamed man was shown walking away from the explosion, thought to be an employee of Fang. The incident took a toll on Nick's mental health, he contacted Eric and claimed that he no longer wanted anything to do with Warbury Warriors and would step down. Further attempts at contact by Eric failed, with Nick seemingly disappearing. Back at Warbury, Eric assumed full running of the club. Initially divided about whom to appoint as manager, he was blackmailed by long-suffering second-in-command, Dave Boreham, with Boreham holding the fact that Eric appointed Ajabu Ndonga, an underage teenage African footballer, for the club in 2010. Dave threatened to report Eric's misconduct to FIFA, for violating rules concerning young players. During Dave's management, he laid off many of the older players, or put them on the bench as substitutes. Many players opposed Boreham's reign over the club, with a few deciding to leave also. Although despite this, Warbury continued to flourish in the Premier league. As the months went on, former player, Fabian de Guisson, who had been crippled by an injury from falling out of a window a few months before, was appointed assistant manager by Eric, much to Dave's disgust. Eric believed that this move would be popular amongst the team, although this was not the case. Lead striker and star player, Callum Angelo took the decision to leave at the end of his contract. Claiming De Guisson's managerial position was one of the reasons he was leaving. This brought the club into disrepute, Fabian asked Scrapper Griswell, who had been "on the bench" for much of the previous games to play "up front", he agreed. Meanwhile, Eric discovered he was innocent of any wrongdoing regarding Ndonga and promptly informed Boreham, who resigned as manager before Eric reported him to the police. De Guisson assumed the managerial position full-time shortly after.

Nick, meanwhile, had been living a life away from the public eye, still on the Isle of Man, where he was still recovering from the mental anguish of losing Li Ming. He had inherited the club after Li Ming's death and took the decision to sell it. While visiting a Solicitors on the Isle of Man to begin proceedings of selling the club to Eric, he learnt he was left an excess of 1 billion pounds in Li Ming's will. This prompted Nick to consider what he was doing. In a series of flashbacks, he recalled Li Ming telling him to pursue with Warbury, although also remembering his father's dying words to move on to a larger club. He later informed the Solicitors that he was no longer interested in selling Warbury to Eric and returned to England, where he told Eric in person. After Eric had learnt of Nick's intentions, he asked him why he wanted to return, Nick replied it was what Li would have wanted.

At the start of the 2015–16 season, Warbury were deducted a total of 30 points, as they had entered administration, but not exited it before the start of the season and financial irregularities over Jarvis decision to make Sports TV a part of the club's business.

=== Comic Era ===
As the comic era opened, Eric and Vanessa were taking money out of a cash machine, while three bank robbers ran out of the bank dressed in masks of Prince Charles, The Queen and Tony Blair carrying £100 thousand in cash. Eric subsequently managed to delay the robbers by pretending that his car which was parked in the way of their getaway vehicle wouldn't start. As a result, the robbers subsequently abandoned the money and ran off, as the police turned up before Warbury were drawn at home to Manchester United in the Carling Cup later that day. The robbers subsequently hatched a plan to get revenge on Openshaw by kidnapping his wife and placing a £2 thousand bet on Warbury to lose to Manchester United 9–0 in four different bookies. They subsequently traced her movements before kidnapping her ahead of the game and taking her to their hideout where Pickaxe Pete was waiting for them as he wanted in on their plans.
