= Illustrated Chips =

1890–1953 British comic

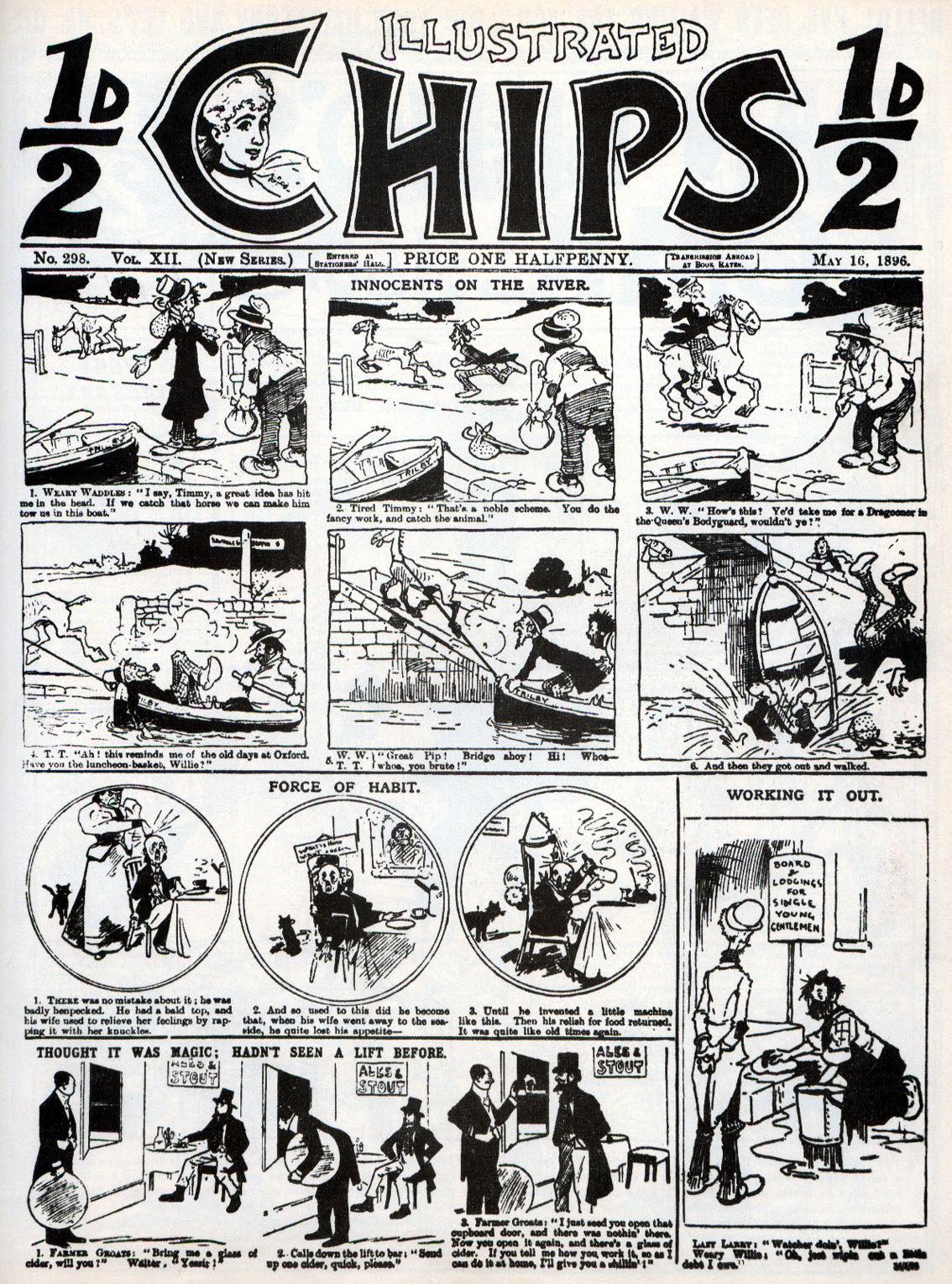
- Cover of Illustrated Chips n°298 (16 May 1896) with the first appearance of the long-running hobo comics series Weary Willie and Tired Tim, then known as "Weary Waddles and Tired Timmy".

Publication information
- Publisher: Amalgamated Press
- Genre: Humor/comedy
- Publication date: 26 July 1890 to 12 September 1953
- No. of issues: 2,997
- Main character(s): Weary Willie and Tired Tim; Hounslow Heath the Highwayman; Casey Court

Creative team
- Artist(s): Tom Browne, Alex Akerbladh

Illustrated Chips was a British comic magazine published between 26 July 1890 and 12 September 1953. Its publisher was the Amalgamated Press, run by Alfred Harmsworth. Priced at a half-penny, Illustrated Chips was among a number of Harmsworth publications that challenged the dominance in popularity of the "penny dreadfuls" among British children.

After a brief initial run of six issues, Illustrated Chips was relaunched and ran for 2,997 issues. Harmsworth titles enjoyed a virtual monopoly of comics in the UK until the emergence of DC Thomson comics in the 1930s. In 1953 Illustrated Chips merged with Film Fun.

From May 1896 to the last issue in 1953 the cover page held a comic strip featuring the tramps Weary Willie and Tired Tim (initially named "Weary Waddles and Tired Timmy"). A reader of Illustrated Chips as a boy, Charlie Chaplin was inspired by the Weary Willie and Tired Tim characters to create his Little Tramp character.

"If you want the simple Chaplin truth behind the Chaplin legend, I started the little tramp simply to make people laugh and because those other old tramps, Weary Willie and Tired Tim, had always made me laugh.”

— Chaplin in 1957.

Weary Willie and Tired Tim were created by illustrator Tom Browne, with Browne playing a major role in the evolution of the British comic style, influencing Bruce Bairnsfather, Dudley D. Watkins and Leo Baxendale.

Beginning in 1909 with Hounslow Heath the Highwayman, Alex Akerbladh created various cartoon strips for the magazine. Another notable feature in Illustrated Chips was Casey Court beginning in 1902 and continuing to the last issue. This cartoon involved a single and very busy picture where many kids from Casey Court, led by Billy Baggs, who were collectively referred to as the Nibs, would get up to some crazy scheme.

Illustrated Chips is no relation to the comic Whizzer and Chips, which launched in 1969. Coincidentally, however, both comics were eventually merged with Buster, with Illustrated Chips initially merging into Film Fun.

== Sources ==
- Illustrated Chips (26 July 1890–1890) at the Grand Comics Database
- Illustrated Chips (September 6, 1890 - 1952) at the Grand Comics Database
