= The Bumpkin Billionaires =

British comic strip

The Bumpkin Billionaires was a British humoristic comic strip which ran from 1974 until 2000. It was drawn by Mike Lacey throughout except for the last years in Whizzer and Chips by Jim Hanson.

== Concept ==
The main characters in the story were a family of four country yokels — "Ma" and "Pa" and their children Billy and Daisy — who had come into a great deal of money (possibly inspired by The Beverly Hillbillies). As the saying goes, however, "money does not bring happiness" and this particular family saw their wealth as more of a curse than a blessing. They aspired to returning to the simple life of paupers and were desperate to get rid of their money. Thus they would come up with an endless number of "get-poor-quick schemes", much to the distress of their long-suffering bank manager.

The stories usually ended with the Bumpkins' plans backfiring, leaving them either as well off as they were before or even more wealthy, much to the delight of the bank manager.

== History ==
It originally debuted in the UK comic Whoopee! in issue 1, dated 9 March 1974. When Whoopee! merged with Whizzer and Chips in 1985, the strip went with it, becoming part of the Whizzer section. Likewise, when Whizzer and Chips merged with Buster in 1990, the strip continued there. It remained in Buster until the comic's last issue at the beginning of 2000, though, as with all other strips by this time, it had by now become a reprint.
