= Memory Banks =

Cartoon strip created by Mark Bennington

Memory Banks was the name given to a comic cartoon strip created by Mark Bennington, which appeared in Whizzer and Chips and then went on to appear in Buster.

The cartoon strip was about a boy called Bernie Banks, who had a very bad memory. The name of the strip was an ironic and sarcastic take on this. Despite several tricks tried by himself and other people, he would always fail to remember something important which is what provided the main plot of each strip.

In the final issue of Buster, it was revealed that he died because he forgot to keep breathing. Mark Bennington has also drawn Go Compare for The Dandy and Jungle Jane, Captain Crook, and Fission Chips for Lucky Bag Comic.
