= Junior Rotter =

British comic strip created by Trevor Metcalfe in 1980

Junior Rotter was a British comic strip, created by Trevor Metcalfe in 1980. The series were originally published in the magazine Whizzer and Chips, and from 1990 on in Buster when the two magazines merged.

== Concept ==
Junior Rotter was a spoof of J.R. Ewing, the breakout character from the TV soap opera Dallas. His sister, Sue Helen, is a parody of Sue Ellen, from that same series. Except for their names it had nothing else to do with this soap opera. Junior Rotter and Sue Helen were sibling rivals. Rotter was a bad boy, while Sue Helen was a decent, charming and helpful person whom he tried to trick, always failing in the end. Their rivalry often extended into an all-out conflict. The final issue of Buster included a page showing the ultimate fates of the characters; Junior Rotter was shown as becoming the Prime Minister.

== Similar characters ==
A similar character, also loosely based on the character from Dallas, named Jay R Hood appeared in rival publisher DC Thomson's Nutty coincidentally. This strip also featured a character named Sue Helen who acts as Jay R's most common victim.
