= Mustapha Million =

British comic strip

Mustapha Million was a British gag-a-day comic strip, created by Reg Parlett. It appeared in Cheeky Weekly in its first issue on 22 October 1977. The magazine would later merge with Whoopee! and on its turn with Whizzer and Chips, while the comic ran in those magazines as well.

== Concept ==
Mustapha is a boy, presumably of Middle Eastern descent, whose father made a fortune by discovering oil. His name is a play on words for "Must have a million". In the first story, with their newfound wealth Mustapha's father sends his son to the UK for education. Sad at leaving his friends at home behind, he endeavours to make new friends at his new school. His father provides him with a mansion, tutors, and bodyguards to keep young Mustapha out of trouble.

A lot of earlier stories revolve around Mustapha trying to fit in with his friends at his new home. Mustapha would regularly hear something and misinterpret it, normally involving a friend in trouble, or one who Mustapha believes to need assistance. He would then make use of his wealth to help his friends only to find it wasn't needed. Several attempts include giving the paperboy huge tips, causing him to retire and buy a mansion.

== Publication history ==
Reg Parlett was the original Mustapha Million artist in Cheeky Weekly, but in later issues the strip was drawn by Joe McCaffrey, who continued to draw the strip after it moved into Whoopee!. Sometime around when Whoopee! merged with sister comic Whizzer and Chips, Frank McDiarmid took over drawing duties. The stories were a little edgier, not necessarily having the happy endings of the McCaffrey strips. Mustapha appeared to be more understanding of British culture and just wanted to have fun. Another change for these stories would be the fact that Mustapha's friends would often end up annoyed at him for something that happened during the story.

When Whizzer and Chips merged with Buster Comic in 1990, Mustapha was not one of the characters that was brought over. Early McCaffrey strips could still be regularly seen in Big Comic Fortnightly and Funny Fortnightly.
