= Joker (comic strip) =

1971 comic strip

First title panel of a Christmas themed strip in Whizzer and Chips

Joker was a British comic strip. It first appeared in Knockout issue 1 (series 2) on 12 June 1971. Knockout merged with Whizzer and Chips in 1973. Joker stayed in Whizzer and Chips as a Whizz-kid until the end, when he continued in Buster until the close of the comic on 4 January 2000. On the "last page" of Buster, Joker reveals that he was Jeremy Beadle all along. The strip was written by Malcolm Morrison, and illustrated by Sid Burgon.
