= Nipper (comics) =

British comic book

Nipper was a short-lived British comic book magazine, published between 31 January to 12 September 1987. Unlike most British comics by this time, which had A4 paper size, this was an A5 comic, which meant it was half the size of all the others, hence the name 'Nipper'. Nipper ran for 16 Issues, had just one holiday special (in 1987) and just one annual in 1988. By the time of its last issue, however, it had become an A4 comic like the others. After that it merged with Buster.

It should not be mistaken by the Daily Mail Nipper annuals from the 1930s, 40s and 50s.

== Comics published in the magazine ==
- Blaster and Bignoise
- Brad Break — An accident-prone young man who spent most of his time in hospital with at least one limb in plaster. Strips would frequently focus on Brad's discharge from hospital, only for him to suffer another accident before even leaving the building. Merged into Buster.
- Double Trouble — Twins Jon and Suzy, who would constantly bicker and attempt to outdo each other. Most strips saw one sibling having the upper hand until the end of the story, when the tables would be turned, although sometimes the two were forced to work together. Merged into Buster.
- Felix The Pussycat — A superhero-obsessed boy dresses up as a cat to fight crime ineptly, parodying Billy the Cat from The Beano. Illustrated by Tom Paterson.
- First-Time Fred
- Frankie's Flashlight
- Flapper
- James Pond
- Kelpie's Kingdom
- Magic Trainers
- Mighty Mouth — A young man with the ability to 'throw' his voice, ventriliquist-style. He would usually use this ability to cause mischief (for example, making it appear as if a teacher had insulted the headmaster) but occasionally threw his voice to help others. Mighty Mouth had inherited his talent from his father, who would sometimes use it to turn the tables on his son. Merged into Buster.
- My 'Dad' Mum — A single mum who tries to prove to her son, Sam, that she can give him anything a dad could and can do anything a man can do. Merged into Buster.
- Nipper — A very small boy frequently mocked for his size. Strips usually focused on his (failed) attempts to appear taller, or situations where his stature unexpectedly proved to his advantage. Merged into Buster.
- Nursery Crimes
- Ricky Rainbow — A boy with the ability to change colour at will; something he would often use to escape from or foil the schemes of local bully, Bruiser. Although he could usually control his colour changing, occasionally his mood would dictate it (for example literally turning green with envy, or blue when depressed). Ricky could also turn multi-coloured, such as turning tartan, but the difficulty of this would temporarily drain his colour-changing powers. Merged into Buster.
- Roy's Toys — A boy whose toys secretly came to life when he left the room. A recurring theme was Roy deciding to throw away one of his toys, with the other toys having to plot to save their friend (without Roy realising they could come to life). Merged into Buster.
- School Funds — A school constantly under threat of closure due to lack of money. Its pupils would frequently come up with schemes to raise funds to keep the school open, with varying success. Sometimes fate would intervene and save the day, whilst on other occasions schemes would go wrong and leave the school worse off than before. Merged into Buster.
- Strong Arm
- Sweeping Beauty
- The Savers — A family obsessed with economising, often getting involved in outlandish schemes to do so. Although the rarely ended up saving money in the way they expected, an unexpected turn would often mean they saved or made more money than originally expected. From 1989 onwards the popularity of green/environmental issues saw the focus of the strip switch, with the family now focusing on saving the planet rather than money. Merged into Buster.
- Will and Bill
- Wonder Boy
