= Odd Ball (comic strip) =

British comic strip

Odd Ball is a long-running British comic strip in the British comic magazine Whizzer and Chips' and survived its merger with Buster. It debuted in 1969 and ended when Buster sold its final issue on 4 January 2000. Latterly appearing in reprints, it was drawn throughout its run by Terry Bave. His subtitle was "Nobby Noodle owns Odd Ball, the amazing toy from space".

Odd Ball follows the adventures of the titular red rubber ball which accidentally found itself kicked from a distant planet onto earth. Its finder, Nobby, remained its owner. Odd Ball could see and speak, and was able to turn himself into any shape at will. In later years, Nobby's dad lost his moustache and beard, and gained a full head of hair – his head was also redrawn at the time. Odd Ball also gained a Time Travel shape in the late 1980s, where previously he had been strictly restricted to rubber versions of day to day objects.

From 3 November 1990 until 4 January 2000, the series ran in Buster. In the final episode, Odd Ball gets punctured on a thorn and dies.
