= Shiver and Shake =

British comic magazine

Publication information
- Publisher: IPC Magazines Ltd
- Schedule: Weekly
- Publication date: 10 March 1973 – 5 October 1974
- No. of issues: 79

Shiver and Shake was a British comic magazine published every Monday by IPC Magazines Ltd. It ran from (issue dates) 10 March 1973 to 5 October 1974, when it merged with Whoopee! As often happens with British comics, many names of strips were a play on popular television programmes and films of the time. The theme of the strips were mainly horror (albeit of a comic nature); similar to the later Monster Fun; indeed, Frankie Stein appeared in both comics.

In an idea borrowed from the successful Whizzer and Chips, it was two comics in one; Shake being a pull-out section from Shiver. The main star of Shiver was a ghost of the same name, while the eponymous Shake was an elephant. Both had their own strips in their respective sections (The Duke's Spook and Shake). In 1973, the comic also featured a one-page strip starring stand-up comedian Charlie Williams.

Shiver and Shake ran for 79 issues. It also had eight specials, from 1973 to 1980, and 13 annuals, from 1974 to 1986.

== Shiver strips ==
- Adrian's Wall
- Biddy's Beastly Bloomers
- Creepy Car
- Frankie Stein by Ken Reid (originally from Wham!)
- The Ghost's Revenge
- Ghoul Getters Ltd
- Ghouldilocks
- Grimly Feendish by Leo Baxendale (originally from Smash! — although the character first appeared in Wham! — the first eleven issues of Shiver and Shake reprinted stories from Smash! but then new adventures began, lasting until issue #77).
- The Hand
- Hire a Horror (from Cor!!)
- Horrornation Street
- Scream Inn
- The Shiver Givers
- Soggy the Sea Monster
- Sweeny Toddler
- Webster
- Ye Haunted Lake

== Shake strips ==
- Blunder Puss
- Damsel in Distress
- The Desert Fox
- Gal Capone
- Jail Birds
- Lolly Pop
- Moana Lisa
- Riddle Me Ray
- Sample Simon
- Sports School
- Tough Nutt and Softy Centre
