= Faceache =

British comic strip

Faceache was a comic strip appearing in British comics in the 1970s and 1980s. He was created by Ken Reid.

== Publication history ==
Faceache first appeared in issue #1 of Jet, dated 1 May 1971. The strip was retained when Jet merged with Buster later that year, the first merged issue dated 2 October 1971. Reid continued drawing Faceache until his death in early 1987. Dez Skinn and Frank McDiarmid took over from then on, until the strip ended in the issue dated 1 October 1988.

=== Proposed collected edition ===
Rebellion Developments is due to republish the Faceache series as part of The Treasury of British Comics.

== Fictional character biography ==
Ricky Rubberneck was a boy with a "bendable bonce" (head), his skin like stretch rubber. At will, he could alter his face into anything. The term "faceache" was commonly used in England from the 1950s onwards to mean "miserable-looking person".. References to the character's real name being Ricky Rubberneck were dropped early on, and he was subsequently known solely as Faceache.

Initially, the face-changes were accompanied by variety of sound effects such as "Twang!", "Doyng!" and "Gloylp!", until issue 21 of Jet, in which the consistent word "scrunch" was used for the first time. This was dropped after a while, reverting to random sound effects, until finally in issue 646 of Buster on the 6th January 1973, the words scrunge and unscrunge were introduced for the first time and immediately became the permanent descriptors of the transformations, the latter being used when Faceache returned to his normal appearance.

Several of the stories were set at Belmonte School, home to two other recurring characters — his friend Cyril, and the headmaster Mr. Snipe.

As the years went by, Faceache's scrunges got more and more complex, with him able to appear identical to other people, and even scrunging his entire body into various (monstrous) shapes, rather than just his face. In one strip he turned himself into a dodo, tricking his teacher into believing that that bird was not extinct; in another, he became a grotesque mole-like creature, burrowing under a smoke chimney and causing it to collapse.

=== Later appearance ===
An adult Faceache appears in the 2005–2006 comic book limited series Albion, as one of a number of comics characters who have been imprisoned by the British government. In Albion Faceache's real name is said to be "Frederick Akeley".

== See also ==
- British humour
