= Scarth A.D. 2195 =

Scarth A.D. 2195 is a British erotic science fiction comic strip created in 1969 by writer Jo Addams and illustrator Luis Roca and originally published in British newspaper The Sun. It was also reprinted in The Menomonee Falls Gazette from #95 until it ceased publication.

The title appears to be a parody of Garth, which was featured in the Daily Mirror. After 1972, its title was changed to Scarth A.D. 2170. Les Lilley is also credited with directing the storylines of Scarth. In 1978 The Sun's comic page returned to erotic science fiction with Axa.
