= Toby Twirl =

Cartoon character created by Sheila Hodgetts

Toby Twirl is a cartoon character created by children's author Sheila Hodgetts for her publisher, Sampson Low, Marston & Co. Ltd. during the 1940s and 1950s. All of the stories are illustrated by Edward Jeffrey. The first book, Toby in Pogland, was produced in large format and published in 1946. Four other large format books followed. The standard sized annual format, also published in 1946, began a series that continued until 1958, totalling 14 in all. There were also other formats including small strip books, pop-up books and jigsaws. A series of eight Toby Twirl Tales, each with two stories, were published between 1950 and 1954.

== Stories ==
Toby Twirl is a young anthropomorphic pig who was based upon a soft toy created by Edward Jeffrey's wife. Toby's friends are Eli (an elephant) and Pete (a penguin), both of whom generally accompany him on his adventures. Most of the stories are written in rhyming couplets. Several of the stories take place in Dillyland, a country of small humans that Toby and friends manage to reach using a miniature railway line with an engine called The Dillypuff crewed by Clem and Joe. There is also a boat called The Dillypaddle.

== Sheila Hodgetts ==
Sheila Hodgetts was born on 27 January 1924, in Laindon, Essex. Her family moved later near to Eastbourne, Sussex, where she attended Brighton Girls as a weekly boarder. During World War II, she joined the WAAF (Women's Auxiliary Air Force) in 1941, and met her husband-to-be who was at that time serving in the RAF (Royal Air Force). They married in 1942 and have two daughters: Tania (born 1945) and Domini (born 1948). In 1946, when her husband was demobilised from the RAF, her family moved to the West Midlands.

Hodgetts sustained Toby Twirl's stories across twelve years of large-format "annuals" - containing several stories, crosswords, board games, colouring-in pictures, and even a Toby Twirl song - from 1946, beginning with The Toby Twirl Annual, through to 1958, Toby Twirl Adventures. Hodgetts also wrote four full-length large-format story books, Toby Twirl in Pogland (1946), Toby Twirl Rescues Prince Apricot (1947), Toby Twirl and the Mermaid Princess (1948), and Toby Twirl and the Magic Ring (1952).

In smaller hard-back format, Hodgetts also wrote eight "Toby Twirl Tales", from 1949 to 1954, each having two stories. The first of these contained "The Weeping Dragon" and "The Imp of Mischief", and the last contained "The Patchwork Man" and "The Lost Piccaninny".

Other Toby Twirl materials created by Hodgetts included daily newspaper comic strips, such as for the Yorkshire Evening Post, beginning in 1959. These led to several small landscape-format "strip books", such as Toby Twirl on Dapple Heath and Toby Twirl and the Talking Poodle (ca. 1954), and Toby Twirl and the Bullfighter, and Toby Twirl and the Marionette. There were also colouring books, magic colouring books (using water), and pop-up books, and jigsaw puzzles. With Jeffrey's illustrations, Sheila Hodgetts also published two non-Toby-Twirl titles: the fairy tale story, The Sleeping City (1947), and One Magic Night (1947).

Hodgetts had an extensive career as an author for several other series of children's books in the 1950s and early 1960s. These included "Sleepy Time Tales" - such as Sleepy Time Tales of Primrose Wood - a series of books that contained fifteen, or twelve, short bedtime stories.

A totally different series featured the "Adventure Twins", with daring deeds in helicopters and racing cars appearing on the front-covers: The Adventure Twins Take a Chance (1953), and Thrills With the Adventure Twins (1954). Both of these contain several short stories, the former including: Jungle Treasure, Spies on Rock Island, The Sacred Cobra, The Emperor's Daughter, and Adventure in the Desert.

Hodgetts also created several other titles within a series of "Cherub story" books (with a winged cherub appearing on the front cover as a series logo). For example, The Brave Little Cowboy (1952), illustrated by R. MacGillivray, tells the adventures of Little Tex, the bravest cowboy in the Wild West who rides The Range to find adventures with his trusty pony, Ranger. Other titles included The Lost Baby Fairy, Little Kanga's Pocket, and The Little Red Lorry (1952), this latter illustrated by Vera Rice-Jay.

Sheila Hodgetts was involved in the creation and release of a new Toby Twirl book, Toby Twirl and the Reindeer–A Christmas Story and Activity Sticker Book (2007).
