= Krazy (comics) =

British comic book magazine

- Cover of the 1st issue, dated 16 October 1976

Publication information
- Publisher: Fleetway and IPC
- Schedule: Weekly
- Format: Ongoing series
- Genre: Humor/comedy
- Publication date: 16 October 1976 – 15 April 1978
- No. of issues: 79

Krazy was a British comic book magazine published every Monday by IPC Magazines Ltd. It ran from (issues dates) 16 October 1976 to 15 April 1978, when it merged with stable-mate Whizzer and Chips. In 1977, one of the characters in the comic, Cheeky, proved popular enough to get his own comic, Cheeky, which was later merged into Whoopee!. The comic included a "disguise" back-cover, such as the cover of a diary or brochure, which allowed readers to hide the comic from parents or teachers (although one issue on April Fools' Day had the front cover upside down).

== Stories ==
Krazy was noted for its rich content of small humorous jokes and illustrations positioned at random places among the comic strips and features. The central storyline of the comic centred around the exploits of a group of children called the Krazy Gang who lived in Krazy Town, featured in a comic strip drawn by cartoonist Ian Knox. The Krazy Gang also spawned spin-off stories within the same publication: Pongalongapongo, featuring Pongo Snodgrass, the unhygienic, bullying antagonist; and 'ello, It's Cheeky, a mischievous buck-toothed prankster and Krazy Gang member, drawn by Frank McDiarmid. Cheeky's popularity outgrew the spin-off strip, and after a few months the character featured in his own publication, Cheeky Weekly, launched in October 1977.

Other strip artists included Robert Nixon and Terry Bave.

Regular Krazy comic strips included:

- 'ello, It's Cheeky
- Big Game Hunter (comic strip)|Big Game Hunter
- Birdman and Chicken
- Detective Fumbly's (Nut) Case Book, a text story usually with one illustration, rather than a conventional strip
- Fit Fred and Sick Sid
- Handy Andy
- Hit Kid
- Kid Comic
- The Krazy Gang
- Micky Mimic
- Paws
- Pongalongapongo
- Ray Presto
- Over-Helpful Helen, a story about a well-meaning young lady that is always poking her nose into other people's business
- Scaredy Cat
- The 12½p Buytonic Boy
