= Shiner (comics) =

Shiner was a British comic strip drawn by Mike Lacey. It was published in the magazine Whizzer and Chips, where the character first appeared in the second issue in 1969. Whizzer and Chips characters were divided into "Whizz-kids" and "Chip-ites", reflecting respectively the two sections of the comic. Shiner was the leader of the "Chip-ites". He was an amateur boxer, constantly getting into trouble with his mother, who disapproved of his activity. Shiner usually ended up getting a black eye in each issue, hence his name (in 20th-century British English, shiner has a colloquial meaning of "black eye").

== Reference ==
Unlike most of the Whizzer and Chips characters, Shiner was not transferred into Buster and thus was terminated in 1990.
