= Bookworm (comics) =

Bookworm was a British humoristic comic strip, first published on 22 April 1978 in the magazine Whoopee! and survived Whoopee!'s merger with Whizzer and Chips in 1985, becoming a Chip-ite. It was drawn by Sid Burgon for most of its history, although Barry Glennard drew a substantial number of episodes.

== Concept ==
The comic strip centers around a young boy, "Bookworm", who indeed is a huge bibliophile. He is never seen without a book, and his parents often try to force him to do more "boyish" things, like playing football. The results are typically disastrous.
