= Buster Capp =

British comic strip series (1960-2000)

Buster Capp is a British comic strip series which debuted on 28 May 1960 in the magazine Buster and ran until January 2000. The character was the mascot of the magazine too. The series is a spin-off of Andy Capp, starring Andy's young son Buster, despite not being drawn by the original artist of that comic, Reg Smythe. The first artist was Bill Titcombe, but Hugh McNeill took over as artist after less than a year. After a few years Ángel Nadal took over and drew the strip until 1974, when he was followed by Reg Parlett. Tom Paterson in turn took over from Parlett in 1985 and drew the strip until 1990. Jimmy Hansen then became the strip's artist until the magazine folded in 2000; the magazine started using reprints of Hansen's earlier strips in 1998, but he still drew a complete new strip once a month, along with covers for every magazine until the end of its life.

== Swedish version ==
There also existed a Swedish version of Buster Capp, done directly for the Swedish edition by local Swedish artists; this version was a heavily sports-orientated humour strip.
