= Lazy Bones =

Lazy Bones was originally a comic strip in the British comic Whizzer and Chips. It made its first appearance in 1978.

The strip was about a boy called Benny Bones, who would constantly fall asleep everywhere, much to the annoyance of his parents. Until 1986, the strip was drawn by Colin Whittock, and moved to Buster in 1990 after Whizzer and Chips ended. Here it stayed, surviving on reprints, until the final issue. Artist Jack Edward Oliver included Benny in the last page of that issue, revealing how all the characters in the comic came to an end. It featured Benny explaining to a doctor that he's suffering from insomnia.

== Colin Whittock ==
Colin Whittock, the original artist of Lazy Bones, is the head cartoon illustrator for http://www.aquarterof.co.uk, an online sweetshop inspired by Whizzer and Chips.
