= Bobby's Ghoul =

Comic strip

Bobby's Ghoul was a comic strip originally appearing from 29 August 1992 until 1995 in the British comic magazine Whizzer and Chips, and later Buster after the two comics merged. One of the artists was Anthony Hutchings.

The story revolved around a boy, Bobby, and his girlfriend, who happened to be a ghost. As such, she was able to fly, pass through walls, and do all sorts of ghostly things, causing great hilarity and hi-jinks.

Artist Jack Edward Oliver included the characters on the last page of Buster's final issue, revealing how all the characters in the comic came to an end. Bobby's girlfriend breaks up with him because while she has remained young (due to being a ghost), he has aged and become a bald, wrinkled, toothless old man.
