= Ronald Michaud =

American cartoonist

Ronald Michaud is an American cartoonist. He received the National Cartoonist Society Advertising and Illustration Award in 1969 and 1983 for his work.
