= Blaine (cartoonist) =

Canadian political cartoonist (1937–2012)

Blaine (July 7, 1937 – February 5, 2012) was the name used by Canadian political cartoonist Blaine MacDonald.

Blaine was born in Glace Bay, Nova Scotia, and later relocated to Hamilton, Ontario. His work was published in The Hamilton Spectator. He received the National Cartoonist Society Editorial Cartoon Award for 1969. In 1963 Blaine became the first cartoonist to win what became the internationally famous Salon of Cartoons, in Montreal. He once presented a pencil sketch of President Lyndon B. Johnson to him at the White House.

Blaine died in Hamilton on February 5, 2012.
