= The 12½p Buytonic Boy =

British comic strip

The 12½p Buytonic Boy was a British comic strip, created by Robert Nixon, although Brian Walker frequently deputised when Bob was on leave. It debuted as "Half a Dollar Boy" in issue 37 of Monster Fun comic, before becoming a regular feature in the first issue of the magazine Krazy, dated 16 October 1976.

== Concept ==
The strip was about a boy called Steve Ford, who, after buying a special tonic from Professor Nutz for 12½ pence, gained special powers. He would later be hired by the Everso Secret Service, using his powers to interfere with the plans of the villainous spies from rival organisation the "NME" (pronounced enemy). This being the period of the Cold War with the Soviet Union, the names of the agents of the NME included Boris and Ivan, and they would occasionally dress as Russians. Part of the joke involved the audience being aware that there was a contemporary British pop-music magazine, the New Musical Express, which was known in the teenage subculture by the nickname the NME.

The character's name, and the title of the strip, spoofed The Six Million Dollar Man television series, whose main character was called Steve Austin, and was known as the "bionic man". Part of the joke was that Ford and Austin were both names of popular car manufacturers in Britain. Prior to getting his powers, Steve Ford crashes his Go-kart, much as Steve Austin gets his after crashing an aircraft.

== Later years ==
After Krazy finished in 1978, he became a Whizzer and Chips Whizz-Kid, and stayed in that comic until early 1986. Around the time the half penny ceased being legal tender, in 1981, the strip was retitled The Buytonic Boy, variously attributing to BB: Buytonic Boy and The Buytonic Boy starring Steve Ford. It would later be retitled, more permanently, to Super Steve, and, after that, Super Steve vs NME Nasties, in which readers were invited to write to the NME, care of the comic's Editor, and suggest ways of defeating Steve (which always failed).

He was also known for three weeks in 1984 as W4 during a short-lived spell when Whizzer and Chips code-number titled its characters in an attempt to attract a teenage audience.
