= John Kent (cartoonist) =

New Zealand cartoonist

Capel John Kent (21 June 1937 – 14 April 2003) was a New Zealand cartoonist who is best known as the author of the erotic and satirical Varoomshka comic strip in the English newspaper The Guardian during the 1970s.

== Biography ==
Born in Oamaru, New Zealand, the son of R. C. H. Kent of the Justice Department, Kent migrated to London in 1959 and first worked in advertising as a copywriter and art director. He was self-taught as an artist. He was influenced by Al Capp, creator of Li'l Abner, and worked principally in felt-tip pen on A4 paper. His Grocer Heath strip was first published in Private Eye in 1969. Varoomshka appeared in The Guardian from 1969 to 1979, and he also contributed work to The Sun, The Daily Mail, The Sunday Times and, from 1998, The Times, where his La Bimba strip showed clear echoes of the earlier Varoomshka.
