= Olaff the Madlander =

British comic strip

Olaff the Madlander (initially published as Adrian the Barbarian) was a comic strip in the comic The Beezer, and later the merged Beezer and Topper, first introduced in 1989. It featured a boy who dressed as a barbarian with a magical sword. He lived in a very strange world where almost anything could happen, whether it be good or bad. Many inanimate objects gained life in the strip, for example a pile of coal for the fire turned into a man called Old King Coal. He appeared in The Beezer annual until the last one dated 2003.

In July 2008, as of issue 3441, Adrian the Barbarian was reprinted in The Beano under the new title of Olaff the Madlander. An explanation was written at the top of the page saying that Olaff and his mum had just moved to the Madlands, but should have been going to the Midlands. This strip was not the first of them, but new speech bubbles indicated that it was (Adrian/Olaff is walking through the door one morning and his mum asks him how he was after the move. This was not in the original, as it is taken from a random issue of the Beezer and Topper – no. 49 to be exact). Olaff the Madlander has only ever appeared in The Beano as reprints, never as new strips.

Olaff the Madlander replaced fellow Beezer and Topper reprint, Fred's Bed. The two strips have never appeared in the same issue together. However, when the Beano received a revamp in issue 3454, (18 October 2008), Fred's Bed returned to the comic, and Olaff has not appeared since.

The first few strips were drawn by Nigel Parkinson, but his version of the character was disliked by the comic's staff, and so for the most part Sid Burgon was the strip's artist, with occasional strips also being drawn by John Geering. After a year, the character started appearing on the cover of the comic in addition to his appearances on the inside. These cover stories were drawn by Robert Nixon.
