= Varoomshka =

British satirical and erotic comic strip

Varoomshka was a British satirical and erotic comic strip by New Zealand cartoonist John Kent that ran in The Guardian from 1969 to 1979. The title character, a buxom and generally scantily-clad young woman, was an everywoman used by Kent to poke fun at the prominent British politicians of the day such as prime ministers Harold Wilson and Edward Heath, and Education Secretary Margaret Thatcher.

The name of the strip was inspired by a fashion model, Veruschka, but the character was based on Kent's wife, Nina.
