= Axa (comics) =

British comic strip

- The cover to Axa #1 (April 1987), art by Enrique Badía Romero

Publication information
- Publisher: News International (1978–1986); Toutain Editor (1983–1984); Eclipse Comics (1987)
- Publication date: July 1978 – October 1987

Creative team
- Created by: Romero
- Written by: Donne Avenell; Chuck Dixon
- Artist: Enrique Badía Romero
- Editor: Cat Yronwoode (Eclipse Comics)

Axa is a newspaper fantasy comic strip and later comic book featuring the eponymous lead character, which was published in British daily tabloid The Sun from 1978 to 1986. It was created and illustrated by Enrique Badía Romero and scripted by Donne Avenell.

== Publication history ==
After a long run on Modesty Blaise, Romero wanted to create his own original character, and came up with the heroine Axa. The strip mixed elements of science fiction and sword and sorcery genres. Axa was commissioned by The Sun newspaper in 1978. The series was designed as a daily three-panel adventure strip; on the advice of his agent, Romero hired Donne Avenell as a scripter; Romero would plot and draw the three panels and Avenell would script the dialogue. As Romero created Axa, he has stated in interviews he prefers the character to Modesty Blaise.

The first strip appeared in the 3 July 1978 edition of The Sun, and would run daily Monday to Saturday. The strip was characterized by frequent female partial nudity, especially from the title character, and has been called good girl art. Romero created a total of 2,238 strips in black/white before it was cancelled. The last strip, which abruptly ended the ongoing storyline, was published on November 16, 1985. Axa was replaced by Striker, a football strip by Sun journalist and design assistant Pete Nash. The storyline was eventually concluded in the album Los Traicionados in 2012, published in Spain.

Romero also produced a longer story in full colour which was published in the Spanish magazine Creepy in issues #52-59 (1983-1984) by Toutain Editor, and later collected in the Axa Color Album; this storyline featured full-frontal nudity from the heroine. After The Sun cancelled the daily version of Axa, Romero returned to draw Modesty Blaise.

Ken Pierce meanwhile collected The Sun strips in collected editions, and in 1985 he signed a deal to co-publish these with Eclipse Comics for the American market. Pierce also brokered a deal between Romero and Eclipse to provide new adventures in the comic book format for the American market. Chuck Dixon was assigned to write the bimonthly ongoing title, which would feature no nudity and more humour. Pierce, who would edit the series, felt this was a necessary change to enable the book to reach as wide an audience as possible. However, Romero's work on Modesty Blaise knocked the book off schedule; while the first issue appeared in April 1987 the second was not released until four months later, and the series was abandoned after two issues.

Another comic book version of Axa was later produced for the Swedish comic magazine Magnum, written by Petter "Pidde" Andersson. The material was reprinted in English in 2000 AD Showcase #4-5 in 1992. The strip was published in a wide number of other countries, including France, Italy, Germany, the Netherlands, Denmark, Finland, Yugoslavia, India and Hong Kong. Syndication rights are currently held by Knight Features.

== Synopsis ==
A holocaust known as the Great Contamination forced the remnants of humanity into the City of Domes. A hundred years later in the year 2080, having grown sick of the regimented and stifling society inside the city, a woman named Axa flees into the untamed wilderness. She begins a new life as a nomadic adventurer in the outside world, meeting various unusual survivors — including the puritanical Middlemen and hideous Mutants. She returns to the City of Domes to find she has passed a test set by the mysterious Director, and is once again sent out into the world, now armed with a sword.

She continues to explore, meeting the reclusive survivalist millionaire Hector Arkady, the underwater feminist society of Sea Dome, the intelligent dinosaurs of the Valley of Mists, Mr. Nero the ruler of the City of Hope, zealot Joy Eden, pirates scourging the coastal Fisher People, the tree-dwelling Sky People, the warring Automators and Mechanics of Junkheap, the deformed Morpho and Grots, the Dispensers of Pill City, the telepathic Lix of Galaland and the alien intelligence Erg.

In her travels Axa is accompanied at various points by Arkady's grandson Jason and the robot Mark Ten. Jason stayed on to help the people of the City of Hope, with gladiator Dirk instead joining Axa and Mark. Mark was damaged battling Eden, while Dirk remained with the Sky People. A repaired Mark Ten rejoined Axa in the Hidden City of the Artisans, where they were also found by Axa's former lover Matt, long believed dead. The trio discover that Axa was a child born to an exiled couple from Pill City. Gala of Galaland created the robot Martha in gratitude for their help as a partner for Mark.

== In other media ==
In January 2011, a mobile phone game was released based on the Axa character. The game targets mainly Nokia phones, but is written in Java and is therefore expandable to other platforms. Los Angeles-based studio Saturn Harvest announced plans to make an Axa feature film in 2005, with a teaser poster for Axa: Battle for the Serpent Gate released in December 2017. As of 2026 no further updates have been announced for the project.

== Collected editions ==
Title	ISBN	Release date	Contents
Axa - The Beginning · The Chosen	9780912277271	1981	The Sun strips 1-240
Axa 2 - The Desired	9789997475640	1982	The Sun strips 241-479
Axa 3 - The Brave · The Gambler	9789997475671	1983	The Sun strips 480-719
Axa 4 - The Earthbound · The Tempted	9780912277011	1983	The Sun strips 720-958
Axa 5 - The Eager · The Carefree	9780912277219	1984	The Sun strips 959-1158
Axa 6 - The Dwarfed · The Untamed	978-9997475800	1984	The Sun strips 1159-1437
Axa 7 - The Mobile · The Unmasked	9780912277295	1985	The Sun strips 1438-1667
Axa Color Album	9780912277271	1986	Creepy #52-59 strips
Axa 8 - The Castaway · The Seeker	9780912277356	1986	The Sun strips 1668-1915
Axa 9 - The Escapist · The Starstruck · The Betrayed	978-0912277363	1988	The Sun strips 1916-2238
