= Knockout (1971 comic) =

British comics periodical

- Cover to Knockout 30 October 1971.

Publication information
- Publisher: IPC Magazines
- Schedule: Weekly
- Format: Ongoing series
- Genre: Action/adventure, humor/comedy
- Publication date: 12 June 1971 to 23 June 1973
- No. of issues: 106 issues

Knockout was a weekly humorous British comics periodical published by Fleetway Publications from 12 June 1971 to 23 June 1973. One of its major claims was that it was in colour throughout - distinguishing it from many comics which were partially in black-and-white - though most of Knockout's pages were in fact only single-colour. Though the publisher was the same, the comic had no content in common with the Knockout (or Knock-Out) which had merged with Valiant seven years previously. This second iteration of Knockout ran until 1973 when it was merged with another Fleetway title, Whizzer and Chips.

== Stories ==
Its strips included:

- Beat Your Neighbour: two families live next door to each other; although the introductory title picture shows them arguing, the two families often tried to be pleasant to one another while secretly trying to outdo each other. The results were quite often far-fetched but unexpected. One example was when one family said to the other that they should drink more milk for health reasons: the second family ordered more milk, the first family ordered even more, and eventually they were both ordering milk in churns, until the dairy brought the cows to their houses and told them to milk the cows themselves.
- Boney: Boney is a skeleton. The strip began with a boy called Billy, who went on an inane ghost train ride at a fair. The ride was so boring that one of the artifacts, Boney, decided to escape with Billy. The strip records the pair's adventures as they try to stop the owner of the ghost train from recapturing Boney. Boney joined Whizzer and Chips in 1973 after Knockout merged with it.
- Booter
- Dead Eye Dick
- Fuss Pot: about a teenage girl of the same name with a pointy nose. Fuss Pot fussed about everything and everyone in her path. At one stage the full title was: "Fuss Pot, the Fussiest Girl of the Lot!" Fuss Pot joined Whizzer and Chips in 1973 after Knockout merged into that comic, and became a Chip-ite. She then joined Buster in 1990 after Whizzer and Chips, in its turn, merged with that publication. Through the medium of reprints, the strip stayed with Buster until the end. The strip was mainly drawn by Norman Mansbridge. He was replaced in the 1990s by Trevor Metcalfe, whose strips introduced Fuss Pot's cousin Scruff Pot. Artist Jack Edward Oliver included Fuss Pot on the last page of Buster's final issue, revealing how all the characters in the comic came to an end. Fuss Pot's excuse was that she was too fussy to appear in the comic.
- Joker
- Pete's Pockets
- Sammy Shrink (originated in Wham!, moved to Pow!, then Knockout) — about a boy who is only two inches tall; by Dave Jenner
- Stinker
- The Group
- The Haunted Wood
- The Super Seven
- The Toffs and the Toughs
- Thunderball
- Wanda Wheels
- Whistler
- Windy
