= Whizzer and Chips =

British Comic Books

- Advertisement for Whizzer and Chips in Smash!, 1 November 1969

Publication information
- Publisher: Fleetway and IPC
- Publication date: 18 Oct. 1969 – 27 Oct. 1990
- No. of issues: 1,092

Whizzer and Chips was a British comics magazine that ran from 18 October 1969 to 27 October 1990, when it merged with the comic Buster. As with most comics of the time, Whizzer and Chips was dated one week ahead of the day it actually appeared on newsstands in Great Britain (the date referred to the day the comic needed to be taken off the shelves to make way for the new issue, rather than a release date). It had no relation to the earlier British comic Illustrated Chips (which ran from 1890 to 1953).

The format of Whizzer and Chips presented the comic as being divided into two separate parts—a novel idea at the time. One part was called Whizzer and the other was called Chips, with Chips existing as a separate pull-out section in the middle. The slogan "Two comics in one, double the fun!" was used. In the offices of publisher Fleetway, Whizzer and Chips was always regarded as one comic.

In common with most British comics of the time, both sections originally had some of their strips printed in semi-colour using black, white and red (duotone), with others in plain black and white. To reinforce the distinction between the two sections, the duotone strips in Chips were later changed to black, white and blue. Whizzer and Chips went full colour on the week of 4 May 1990.

The comic Knockout merged with Whizzer and Chips on 30 June 1973, as did Krazy in 1978, Whoopee! in 1985 and finally Scouse Mouse in 1989.

== Concepts ==
One ongoing concept was that the two comics were fierce rivals. A guest appearance by a character from one of the comic strips in the story of one in the other magazine would be described as a "raid", and the other comic would seek its revenge with a raid of its own the following week. The first raid appeared in issue 2.

Readers were encouraged to become either a "Whizz-Kid" or a "Chip-ite", depending on which section they preferred. The leader of the Whizz-Kids was a boy called Sid and his snake Slippy, from the Sid's Snake comic strip. The leader of the Chip-ites was a boy called Shiner from the comic strip of the same name, who had aspirations to become a boxer and always ended up with a black eye (the eponymous "shiner"). In the first issue of Whizzer and Chips, Sid's Snake was on the cover of Chips, for Shiner did not appear until issue 2.

== Whizzer strips ==
Notable comic strips or characters in Whizzer throughout the comic's 21-year run included:

- Belle Tent
- Bobby's Ghoul
- Champ
- Doodle
- Happy Families
- Joker (from Knockout)
- Lazy Bones
- Me and My Shadow (from issue one—18 October 1969—to 26 December 1970, then rested until its return on 1 January 1972)
- Memory Banks
- Minnie's Mixer (from issue one until 23 June 1973 and the merger with Knockout)
- The Mummy's Curse (from issue one until 26 December 1970)
- Mystery Museum
- Odd Ball
- Sid's Snake
- Slowcoach (from issue one until the merger with Knockout)
- Beat Your Neighbour (from Knockout)
- Store Wars
- Strange Hill (unrelated to the strip of the same name in The Dandy)
- Sweet Tooth
- Sweeny Toddler (from Whoopee!)
- The 12½p Buytonic Boy (from Krazy; later known as Super Steve)
- The Bumpkin Billionaires (from Whoopee!)
- Timothy Tester (from 1 January 1972)
- Tiny Tycoon
- Toy Boy (from Whoopee!)
- Whizz Wheels
- Boney
- The Super 7 (from Knockout comic)

== Chips strips ==
Notable comic strips or characters in Chips throughout the comic's 21-year run included:

- Bewitched Belinda
- Space School – by Mike Higgs
- The Magic of Films
- Bookworm (from Whoopee!)
- Bottom Of The Class
- Boy Boss (from Whoopee!)
- Buffalo Bill
- Calculator Kid (from Whoopee!)
- Cocoa
- Creepy Comix (from Whoopee!)
- The Double Deckers (22 May 1971 to 13 May 1972)
- Footsie the Clown
- Fuss Pot (from Knockout)
- Ginger's Tum
- Guy Gorilla
- Hal's Holdall
- Harry's Haunted House
- Junior Rotter
- The Krazy Gang (from Krazy)
- Loser
- Lucky Dick
- Ma, Pa and Baby Ba (from 20 May 1972)
- Mustapha Million (from Whoopee!)
- The Name Game (from 20 May 1972; charted the fictitious origins of a different name each week)
- Phil Fitt
- Percy's Pets (from Smash!) – by Stanley McMurtry
- Police Dog and Cat Burglar
- Sammy Shrink: The Smallest Boy in the World (originated in Wham!, moved to Pow!, then Knockout) – about a boy who is only two inches tall; by Dave Jenner.
- Shiner
- The Slimms (from Cor!!)
- Super Dad
- Toffee Nose (29 July 1972 to 23 June 1973)
- Town Tarzan
- Watford Gapp
- Wear Em Out Wilf

== Adventure stories ==
Adventure stories in the magazine included the following:

- Alfie in Africa (2 January 1971 to 25 December 1971)
- Archie's Angels (29 July 72 to 23 June 73)
- The Castaways (from 1 January 1972)
- Danny Drew's Dialling Man (1974/75)
- The Perils of Paul White (1970)
- Pursuit of the Puzzler (2 January 1971 until 29 July 1972)
- Revenge of the Puzzler (5 August 1972 until 23 June 1973)
- The Space Accident
- The Spectacular Adventures of Willie Bunk (18 October 1969 to 26 December 1970)
- Trip to Terror (from 30 June 1973; replaced the Puzzler series)
- Who is Sandy? (2 January 1971 to 25 December 1971)
- Wonder Car (1970 to 25 December 1971)

== Annuals and monthlies ==
Whizzer and Chips annuals were produced from 1971 to 1994, and again (with a Best of) in 2015. Monthlies entitled "The Best of Whizzer and Chips Monthly" were also published in the late 1980s and early '90s. Holiday Specials were also published in the summer for most of the run.
