= Whoopee! (comics) =

British comic book magazine

Publication information
- Publisher: IPC Magazines Ltd
- Schedule: Weekly
- Publication date: 9 March 1974 – 30 March 1985
- No. of issues: 572

Whoopee! was a British comic book magazine that ran from (issues dates) 9 March 1974 to 30 March 1985, when it merged with Whizzer and Chips. It was published by IPC Magazines Ltd and ran for 572 issues.

The first issue of Whoopee! ran to forty pages, with a free gift in the form of a 'squirter ring'. The strapline exhorted potential readers to "Get happy — get this paper!".

Shiver and Shake merged with Whoopee! shortly after its launch in 1974, followed by Cheeky in 1980 and Wow! in 1983. 14 “Whoopee” annuals were published, the last one dated 1992. A Best of Whoopee! monthly reprints comic was published for a few years in the early 1990s.

== Strips ==
- Ad Lad — a Les Gray lookalike obsessed with getting his face on television
- Bleep! (from Wow!)
- Blinketty Blink
- Blunder Puss (from Shiver and Shake)
- Bookworm — a bespectacled, book-loving schoolboy
- Boy Boss (from Wow!) — the nominal editor of a children's comic, who annoyed his staff by preferring playground games to official business
- Calculator Kid — a young boy with a distinctive rollercoaster-shaped hairstyle and a helpful calculator which helped him out of scrapes
- Cheeky Chudley — (Bets on the 'osses... it's a no brainer!)
- Cheeky (from Cheeky)
- Chip
- Creepy Car (from Shiver and Shake)
- Creepy Comix (from Wow!)
- Dads as Lads — two dads reminiscing about their childhood while their sons played pranks on them
- Daisy Jones' Locket
- Dick Doobee — 'Back to Front Man', an innovative strip from The Guardian cartoonist Steve Bell
- Evil Eye — a ghostly disembodied optic organ causes previously well-behaved citizens to indulge in criminal activities
- Family Trees (from Wow!)
- Frankie Stein (from Wham! and then Shiver and Shake) — a smiley-faced Boris Karloff lookalike; by Robert Nixon (originally by Ken Reid)
- Fun Fear
- Ghoul Getters Ltd (from Shiver and Shake)
- KBR — Kids Band Radio (from Wow!) — a spoof on the CB radio phenomenon, with similarly outlandish jargon ("the cakes have gonked on my chunker!")
- Kids Court — a courtroom for adults who do wrong to kids
- Lolly Pop — a rotund, extremely rich and incredibly miserly man who begrudged his son almost everything
- Mum's the Word
- Mustapha Million (from Cheeky) — a stereotypical Arab schoolboy who splashed money around to make his schoolmates' lives more comfortable
- 'Orrible 'Ole
- Ossie (from Wow!)
- Paddywack (from Cheeky) — a buck-toothed, curly-haired Irish labourer who enacted Irish jokes in three-panel strips
- Scared-Stiff Sam — a hulking giant who was nonetheless scared of everything, including his own teddy bear
- Scream Inn (from Shiver and Shake)
- Shake (from Shiver and Shake)
- Snarky Sharky (He Always Trips Over Fans!)
- Shipwreck School (from Wow!)
- Shiver (from Shiver and Shake)
- Smiler — an eternally happy lad with a fixed grin
- Snap Happy
- Spare-Part Kit
- Spy School
- Stage School — a grumpy teacher takes a class full of budding comedians, dancers, musicians and novelty performers
- Supermum
- Sweeny Toddler (from Shiver and Shake) — an ugly, mischievous, highly anti-social infant created by Leo Baxendale
- Team Mates (from Wow!)
- The Bumpkin Billionaires — a family of farm labourers win a fortune on the pools and spend all their time trying to give it away
- Tom Horror's World — a bespectacled budding inventor tries out his contraptions on his unwilling father, who usually comes off worst
- Toy Boy — a plaything-obsessed lad, usually seen playing an accordion in the title frame
- Trevor's Treasure Tracker — boy with a metal detector
- Willy Worry — a boy who misunderstood simple expressions (e.g. "I can see right through you"), taking them literally and worrying about the consequences.
