= Buster (comics) =

British comic book

- Buster and Jet (1972)

Publication information
- Publisher: IPC Magazines Ltd; Fleetway
- Schedule: Weekly
- Format: Ongoing series
- Publication date: 28 May 1960 – 4 January 2000
- No. of issues: 1,902
- Main character: Buster

Buster was a British comic which began publication in 1960, originally published by IPC Magazines Ltd under the company's comics division Fleetway, then by Egmont UK Ltd under the same imprint until its closure in 2000. Despite missing issues due to industrial action during its run, the comic published 1,902 issues in total. The comic carried a mixture of humour and adventure strips, featuring the title character Buster and a host of other characters.

== Description ==
The title character, whose strip usually appeared on the front cover, was Buster himself. He was originally billed as Buster: Son of Andy Capp; Andy Capp is the lead character of the eponymous Daily Mirror newspaper strip, and Buster wore a similar flat cap to reinforce the connection. In early issues, Buster often referred to his father, and Andy was seen in the comic (attempting to find a gas leak in three frames of the 18 June 1960 issue; shown in two drawn photographs in the 2 July issue that same year, the first of which was displayed by Buster's mum with the pronouncement, "It's a photo of Buster taken with Andy! You can see he's got his dad's fine straight nose"). Buster's mum was often referred to by name, and was consistently drawn to resemble Andy's wife Flo.

The connection with Andy Capp was gradually forgotten over time, and Andy no longer appeared in the strip by the mid-1960s. From 1965 the strip instead featured Buster in two long-running series: as lead character in the extremely durable Buster's Diary (1960–68 and 1974–85) and in Buster's Dream World (1968–74).

A Swedish edition of Buster began in 1967. At first, most of the material was taken from the UK edition; but as time went on the magazine produced more and more original material. Versions of Buster also appeared in Norway and Finland.

In its final years, the comic mostly consisted of reprints from either Buster itself or from the twelve comics which had merged with it over its 40-year run. The final strip was written by the last cartoonist for Buster, J. Edward Oliver. The last page of that final issue also revealed how every story in the comic ended, typically in a humorous reversal of the obvious, or expected, manner.

== Special ==
In 2009, Egmont UK intended to publish four one-off specials, celebrating the comics Roy of the Rovers, Battle, Buster and Misty. To mark this event, the website BusterComic.co.uk held a poll in which users could vote for their favourite Buster strip. The results were released in May 2009, with X-Ray Specs topping the poll. This was passed onto Egmont, and the special was due for release on 16 September. Misty and Buster then had their release-dates swapped, and the Buster special was finally released on 9 December.

On 19 March 2012, the Royal Mail launched a special stamp collection to celebrate Britain's rich comic book history. The collection featured The Beano, The Dandy, Eagle, The Topper, Roy of the Rovers, Bunty, Buster, Valiant, Twinkle and 2000 AD.

In August 2016, Rebellion Developments purchased The IPC/Fleetway back-catalogue of British comics and characters, and in July 2017 published the Buster classic The Leopard from Lime Street, with other Buster strips Marney the Fox to follow in October, and Faceache in December, with other comics characters from the pages of Scream! also going to be published.

== Absorbed titles ==
As occurred with other British comics such as The Dandy, many other comics merged with Buster over the years, in consequence of which Buster inherited some of their characters:

- Radio Fun (25 February 1961; which itself had merged with The Wonder)
- Film Fun (15 September 1962; which itself had merged with Picture Fun, Kinema Comic, Film Picture Stories, Illustrated Chips, and Top Spot)
- The Big One (27 February 1965)
- Giggle (20 January 1968)
- Jet (2 October 1971) – short-lived comic that ran for 22 issues in 1971. It contained a mixture of both humorous and adventure stories. The comic introduced the character of Faceache, one of Buster's most popular and long running characters.
- Cor!! (22 June 1974)
- Monster Fun (6 November 1976)
- Jackpot (30 January 1982)
- School Fun (2 June 1984)
- Nipper (1 September 1987)
- Oink! (22 October 1988)
- Whizzer and Chips (3 November 1990; which itself had previously absorbed Whoopee!, Krazy, Scouse Mouse, and Knockout; Whoopee! had previously absorbed Wow!, Cheeky, and Shiver and Shake)
