= Hungarian comics =

Comics made in Hungary

- A panel from Pál Korcsmáros's Dirty Fred, the Captain
- Earliest publications: 19th century
- Publishers: Képes Kiadó; Ifjúsági Lapkiadó Vállalat
- Creators: Ernő Zórád; Pál Korcsmáros; Imre Sebők; Attila Fazekas
- Series: Füles; Kretén; Pinkhell; Rejtő-sorozat
- Languages: Hungarian

Related articles

Hungarian comics are comics made in Hungary and by the Hungarian diaspora of the surrounding countries. When dealing with Hungarian comics, one cannot separate comics made by Hungarians from translated foreign matter, since in some eras most of the publications come from the latter group and influence comics fandom and the general picture about comics in the country.

The roots of Hungarian comics reach back to the mid 19th century. Until the late 1930s the development of the genre were parallel to current trends in European comics. Comic strips were generally found in newspapers and magazines, featuring works from both Hungarian and foreign artists. Since comics were so closely bound to the printed media, their creators were mostly caricature artists as well. The years preceding World War II proved to be unfavorable for comics as the mainly Jewish owned yellow press basically disappeared together with comic strips (a great exception were children's comics).

After the few years of the transitional phase following World War II, Hungarian cultural politics were influenced by the Soviet Union, as a consequence comics were regarded as "western cultural trash" and were basically forbidden for years. By the mid-1950s comics were tolerated, but with strict compromises. Under these years adaptational comics were made in great numbers. This period lasting until the late 1970s is regarded by some comics historians as the Golden Age of Hungarian comics; the most respected artists, Ernő Zórád, Imre Sebők and Pál Korcsmáros lived and were active during this period lasting until the mid-1970s.

In the 1980s, under a warmer political climate, translations of foreign comics were published in growing numbers. After the fall of the Iron Curtain a large variety of translated European and American comics were published in the country. Although most companies were full of enthusiasm, only few were strong enough in capital to live through the radically altering circumstances of the 1990s.

This course eventually resulted in the American (superhero) comics' dominance by the middle of the decade. These years also witnessed the appearance of a new generation of Hungarian comics creators.

The few years preceding and following the new millennium seemed to be least successful for comics, many magazines folded during these years leaving several fans without comics. This and some other factors caused fans, artists, publishers, merchants to connect on the Internet and set up new foundations for a wholly revised comics scene. The period lasting since 2004–2005 is commonly referred to as the New Wave of Hungarian comics, since comics scene participants show a degree of activity never seen before.

== Vocabulary ==
The Hungarian word for comics is képregény (pronounced: keːprɛgeːɲ), a combined word (compound) from kép (picture) and regény (novel). The word was already used in the 1930s, (Note: Along with other terms (rajzregény, filmregény, etc.), képregény was used in King Syndicate Feature comic strip advertisements, headings. Such reprinted examples can be seen in Kiss, Ferenc: Kiss magyar képregénytörténet - A nagy amerikai képregénybumm Magyarorszgágon. Published by Kertész, Sándor 2010., second edition: March 2011.) but it only became the exclusive term after 1948, before that, képes történet (pictorial story) and other similar expressions described the medium The words comics (referring to American comics), manga (referring to mainly Japanese comics), bd / bande dessinée (referring to Franco-Belgian comics) are sometimes used in Hungary, but, apart from manga, are not generally in use. (The word sztrip or strip is also used by the Hungarian minorities in Vojvodina, Serbia.)

== History ==
The history of Hungarian comics is best divided along political eras, because of the great influence politics has made on comics.

=== From the 19th century until World War I ===
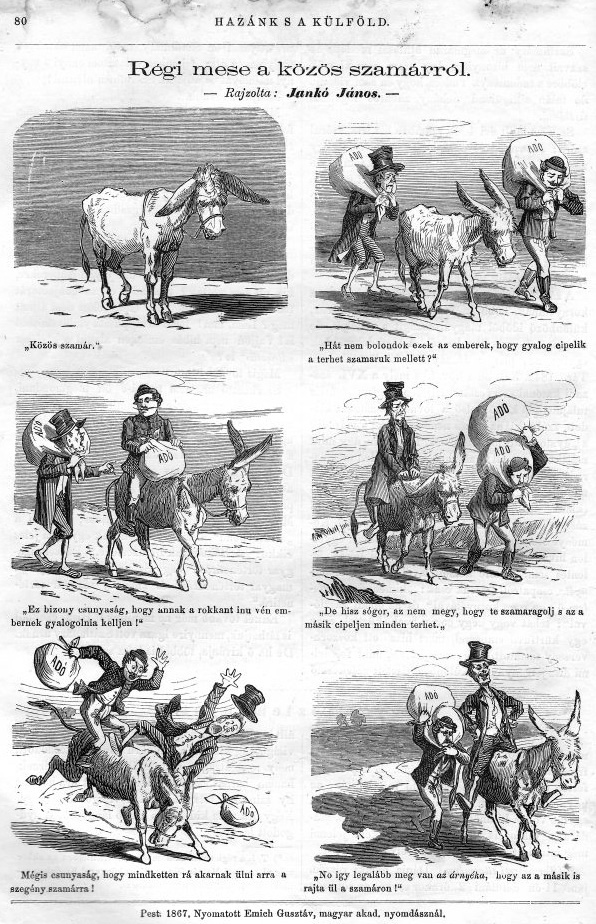
A János Jankó sequentially illustrated story in a Hungarian news journal, 1867.

During the late 19th century Hungary, as part of the Austro-Hungarian Empire, kept pace with the European trends, pointing in the direction of what later became known as modern comics. Rodolphe Töpffer and especially Wilhelm Busch (Max und Moritz) were popular and had great effect on Hungarian journalism, and soon the Hungarian equivalents were born. One of the most important writers of the time, Mór Jókai founded (1858 August 21) and edited a magazine called Üstökös (comet) based on Fliegende Blätter. (During the Monarchy German language Fliegende Blätter was a popular magazine in Hungary, with several thousand subscribers in the country.). Pages were filled with caricatures and "pictorial stories" (called képtörténetek, képes történetek), the European predecessor of modern comics. A short story was told in few sequential pictures, and the text (many times in rhyming poetic form) was placed beneath the images. Many similar journals existed besides Üstökös. Hungary had a flourishing caricature culture at the time, and many of the greatest artists also drew these early types of comics. (Note: At the time cartoonists and artists of this early form of comics did not part yet. For example Sándor Kertész uses the word karikatúrista (cartoonist) describing comic strip artists of the time. (Kertész 2007 p. 23.) The majority of most notable artists of the era listed in the present article can be found as important cartoonists in Hungarian caricature historic writings. (e.g. Révész, Emese (2005). Lázár, Eszter (ed.). Too much, even for Háry, political caricatures by Antal Gáspár and his contemporaries [Ami Hárynak is sok... - Gáspár Antal és kortársainak politikai karikatúrái] (in English and Hungarian) (first ed.). Budapest: kArton.))

==== Notable artists ====
This list contains those comics artists, who are emphasized in Hungarian comics history writings.

- János Jankó (Tótkomlós, October 1, or November 3, 1833 - Budapest, March 29, 1896), originally a painter, but for financial reasons chose to be a journal illustrator. He is considered to be the first Hungarian cartoonist who consciously dealt with this genre. Together with Jókai, they created many picture stories in the style of Wilhelm Busch. His published drawings exceed thirty thousand (accord ing to Kálmán György's cyclopedia: seventy thousand).
- Károly Mühlbeck (Nagysurány, 1869 – Sashalom, 1943) illustrated humor magazines as Kakas Márton, Borsszem Jankó, etc. He created a unique form of the comic strip, that headlined the newspaper, Új idők. These sequential drawings usually did not tell a story in chronological order, they rather showed a current topic from multiple point of views. These very popular works were collected in an individual album in 1935. In May–June 2011 kArton gallery held the first exhibition solely dedicated to Károly Mühlbeck's caricatures and comic strips.
- Ákos Garay (Pusztaapáti, October 3, 1866 – Budapest, January 25, 1952) painter, graphic artist, ethnographer. From 1883 he drew caricatures for most of the humor magazines (Kakas Márton, Bolond Istók, Fidibusz, Üstökös, Urambátyám, Magyar Figaró, Herkó Páter), Borsszem Jankó published his works for over 20 years. His early drawings were in a realistic style, later used distortion as an instrument for caricatures and humorous pictorial stories. One of the fundamental artists who helped Hungarian pictorial stories to reach its classic stage.
- Dezső Bér (Kalocsa, April 10, 1875 – Budapest, October 7, 1924) Graphic artist and painter. Contributing artist, later editor of the humor magazine, Borsszem Jankó. Almost solely dealt with cartoons. One of the fundamental artists, who helped Hungarian pictorial stories to reach its classic stage. He is considered to be one of the most influential cartoonist of his time.
- Miltiadész Mannó (Budapest, March 13, 1879 - Budapest, February 17, 1935.) Graphic artist, painter, sculptor. Started his cartoonist career at Kakas Márton, than continued at Borsszem Jankó, Bolond Istók, Magyar Figaró. One of the fundamental artists who helped Hungarian pictorial stories to reach its classic stage.
- Mór Jókai (Komárom, February 19, 1825 – Budapest, May 5, 1904.): novelist, editor. Although not a cartoon artist, his contributions to the development of classic Hungarian comics are great. He founded and edited humorous, political satire magazines, Nagy Tükör (1856) and mainly Üstökös (1858), which published the very first proto-comics. Jókai also wrote scripts for the cartoonists, these instructions in many cases included detailed layouts, sketches. When Jókai founded Nagy Tükör and Üstökös, cartoonists were hard to find in the country, therefore he himself drew many of the cartoons published in his magazines. This lasted until he employed János Jankó.

=== Interwar period ===
First issue of Hári János, with a page of Lyman Young's Tim Tyler's Luck translated as Puskás Pista

The comic strip boom of the United States had a growing effect on Hungarian newspaper publishing until the late 1930s. American comics flooded all kinds of newspapers, magazines. Hári János (see image) (1936-1937), a magazine for children is considered to be the first Hungarian comic book magazine, with comic strips on every page. Walt Disney strips, Secret Agent X-9, Little Nemo in Slumberland (Kis Némó Álomországban), George McManus strips and many others marked this period.

Not as many Hungarian comics were made in this period, while – for example – Yugoslavia, the southern neighbor, claims this period to be their Golden Age.

During this period the truncated Hungary was an ally of Germany. In 1937 the Minister of Justice began restricting the great amount of pulp literature and yellow press. In 1938 a decree ordered the whole press under the control of the Government. In the same year the "First Jewish Law" was issued. Among others the goal of these two were to "clean" Hungary's cultural life, to eliminate pulp literature. As the Újság, a Hungarian extremist newspaper, commented in 1938: "These are not at all capable to nurture Hungarian self-knowledge, Hungarian honesty, Hungarian heroism, consequently to nurture the Hungarian folk, national and racial self-knowledge." Since most of the comics were published in the mostly Jewish owned yellow press, comics vanished after the law took effect. The situation became even worse after the German troops marched into Hungary: all leftist and liberal media was banned. The only comics of the time were antisemitic ones, from magazines as the militant Harc (combat) or anticommunist ones from newspapers as Egyedül vagyunk (we are alone).

==== Notable artists ====
This list contains those comics artists, who are emphasized in Hungarian comics history writings.

- Károly Mühlbeck (see previous chapter)
- Kata Benedek: Drew comics for the children's magazine, Tündérvásár. Her series, Lekvár Peti kalandjai (The Adventures of Pete Jam) ran for over twenty years (1927–1947), and was one of the most popular children's series between the two wars.
- Jenő Jeney (Érendréd, 1874 – Budapest, 1942) painter, graphic artist, illustrator, cartoonist. Studied art from Károly Lotz, his first cartoons were published at the age of 16 (Magyar Figaró, Bolond Istók, Kakas Márton, Urambátyám, Üstökös, Kikiriki, Borsszem Jankó, Mátyás Diák). His style ranged from precisely detailed realistic cartoons to sketchy jokes, portraits. Friss Újság's Vasárnap (Sunday) published his comic strips even after 1938, when comics in general vanished from newspapers.
- Balázsfy Rezső (Döbrököz, August 4, 1885 – Budapest, April 21, 1973) Graphic artist, painter. Studied at Hungarian Academy of Fine Arts and the painting academy in Vienna. Friss Újság's Vasárnap (Sunday) published his and Jeney's comic strips even after 1938, when comics in general vanished from newspapers.

==== Main publications ====
This list contains those publications, that are emphasized in Hungarian comics history writings.

- Áller Képes Családi lapja
- Hári János
- Tündérvásár
- A Kis Lap
- Hasznos Mulattató
- Vasárnap of Pesti Hírlap
- Vasárnap of Friss újság

=== Communist era ===
A cover from communist peasant youth magazine, with collectivist propaganda comics. A typical example from the late 1940s.

In the post-war period, Hungary's cultural-politics were heavily influenced by the Soviet Union. In the first few years comics returned to the newspapers and other magazines: first humorous children comics in 1945, then communist propaganda strips in 1948. The Hungarian term for comics – képregény – became widespread during this short period. In 1950 – according to a famous anecdote – during a visit to Budapest, Finogenov, an influential aesthete from Moscow, called comic books an "imperialist vestige". Within a few days Hungarian prime minister, Mátyás Rákosi withdrew all the "western cultural trash" from the press.

Furthermore, Dr. Fredric Wertham's Seduction of the Innocent attracted some attention on the eastern side of the Iron Curtain. His anti-comics accusations echoed in Hungarian newspaper articles. Some of these were written by Hungarian journalists, but some were translations of American articles (at least signed by American names). During these years even caricatures ridiculed comics for its aggressive nature and pairing it with western trash.

In 1954 Ernő Zórád, one of Hungary's all-time greatest comic book artists, dared to bring back comics with his adaptation of Vladimir Obruchev's Plutonia (comics' title: Az Északi-sarkról a Föld belsejébe – From the North Pole to the Center of the Earth). This was published in Pajtás, a magazine for the Pioneer movement (the communist co-ed equivalent for scouting). 1955 was a milestone in Hungarian comic book history, since this was the year when graphic illustrator Sándor Gugi convinced Tibor Horváth (Later Tibor Cs. Horváth) to create some comics together. It was also Gugi's idea to produce comics that adapt classic literature. No one could call adaptations of famous and recognized literary works "decadent western trash", so comics received a green light at the time. Gugi presumably got the idea of adaptational comics from Classics Illustrated. Adaptational comics, what started out as a trick, became dominant for decades. Sándor Gugi left the field relatively early, but Tibor Cs. Horváth produced a vast of comics scripts for some very talented artists such as Imre Sebők, Pál Korcsmáros and Ernő Zórád. These three had their own easily recognizable style and are considered the greatest comic artists of Hungary.

At the time comics were not published in separate comic books, but sequentially in newspapers (e.g. Népszava), magazines (e.g. Képes Újság, Pajtás), and the crossword puzzle magazine Füles. Füles later became a flagship of Hungarian comic publishing. (Füles published the most comics during the period. It was the most important publisher of Pál Korcsmáros and important publisher for artists like Ernő Zórád.) In December 1956, a few weeks after the soviet tanks ended the Revolution of 1956, György Gál and some journalists started conceiving a new, entertaining weekly magazine based on previous magazines such as Pesti Izé and Füles Bagoly. The magazine based on crossword puzzles, articles and comics immediately became a large success. Some say the magazine had a role in healing the wounds. Between January 1957 and December 1960 11 artists drew especially comics. The sum of their work during this period was 145 comics in 2000 pages. 50% of the storyboards were written by Tibor Cs. Horváth, the other by 17 other writers. 40% of the art was done by Pál Korcsmáros (in 1957 he drew 238 pages only for Füles), 20% by Ernő Zórád and 14% by Imre Sebők. Some attempts were made to create pure comic magazines. One of these was Tábortűz (1957–1965), another magazine for Pioneers, based on the French Camera 34 and full of fresh ideas. Although it did not meet the Pioneer Association's ideas and ordered the editorial to drastically reduce the number of comic pages in the magazine.

A page illustrating adaptational comics with too much textual information (Rejtő/Cs.Horváth/Korcsmáros: A láthatatlan légió)

Adaptational comics are still the source of controversies and debates. Although in most cases the art was beautiful, the panels were heavily packed with narrative texts – a trademark of Tibor Cs. Horváth. By the early sixties this comics type fell into a trap from which it could not escape until recent times. On one hand intellectuals criticized these works for the lack of originality, novelty and artistry, while another major accusation was that comics in general restrict reading habits. However, adaptational comics provided a safe relationship with the cultural-political leadership, and were still popular, comic book import was close to zero, so nothing forced comic artists to move on further.

Still, this compromise made the production of comics possible. In many other countries of the Ex-Eastern Bloc (e.g. Czechoslovakia, Soviet Union, Romania) the situation was even worse with almost no comics of their own. However, some other Eastern Bloc countries at that time had substantial comic book culture, like Yugoslavia and Poland. (Yugoslavia was not influenced directly by the Soviet Union.) For further readings on Ex-Eastern bloc comics culture: Serbian comics, Polish comics, Czech comics

A splash page from the 1983 version of Plutonia (Utazás Plutóniába). Art by Ernő Zórád

A page from the adaptation of Jack London's The Mexican. Art by Imre Sebők, 1959

Ernő Zórád ended his professional relationship with Tibor Cs. Horváth and wrote his own comic scripts. Luckily Zórád was not just a great artist, but also a talented storyteller: these comics came much closer to the medium's own language. He also made experimental collage comics in the early seventies attracting international attention. These works were invited to the Salone Internazionale del Comics festival in 1970 but his portfolio – due to Hungarian bureaucracy – has arrived late. Furthermore, the works has been stolen from the festival. By the late seventies the classic trio of Hungarian comics creators disappeared: Korcsmáros died in 1975, Sebők died in 1980 and Zórád retired temporarily. Since young talents were not introduced during the preceding three decades (except for Attila Fazekas), many mark these years the end of Hungarian comics' golden age.

In the early 1970s famous cartoonists (Attila Dargay, Marcell Jankovics) made ventures in the comics medium. Both of them were talented comic book creators, but both of them rather considered animation as their main field. Jankovics even went as far as publicly despising comics. Dargay continued to create comics in the 1980s.

At the time very few foreign comics were allowed to be published for the Hungarian market. The exceptions were mainly comics from the Eastern bloc or comics with socialist/communist background. The exceptions:

- Mozaik: The East German Mosaik was first published in 1971 and ran as a monthly comic book series from 1973 until 1990. Outside East-Germany Mosaik was the most popular in Hungary, and still has many hardcore fans. The issues were edited in Hungary, published and printed in GDR together with the original German version, than distributed by the Hungarian Postal Service. The title returned to the newsstands in 2001 and is still published alongside many special issues for collectors.
- Pif and Vaillant: These were imported from France and sold at newspaper stands. This was allowed because the biweekly magazine belonged to the communist L'Humanité newspaper group. In the seventies some French (mainly from Vaillant) and Italian (mainly western from Bonelli) comics were published in Füles, Pajtás, etc.
- Danish and Finnish editions of American superhero comics were printed in Hungary's Kossuth nyomda. A large number of these forbidden fruits were sold/traded on flea markets, despite the fact most Hungarians could not read them.

In an environment much more liberal, the Hungarian minorities of Yugoslavia published many comics. The most important publisher of the time was Forum Marketprint, which presented Buksi magazine in the sixties. This was the Hungarian language print of the Serbo-Croatian Kekec magazine, also published by Forum-Marketprint.

==== Notable artists ====
Although Zórád, Korcsmáros and Sebők are commonly mentioned as the three musketeers of comics, the era had many more talented and important artists. This list contains names emphasized in Hungarian comics history writings.

- Sándor Gugi (Budapest, September 12, 1917. – Budapest, December 31, 1998.) Studied at the Academy of Fine Arts under the instruction of Vilmos Aba-Novák. In 1949 he left teaching to become a newspaper illustrator at Szabad Nép. Started drawing comics in 1954 at Tanácsok lapja, a periodical for the workers of local municipalities. (Note: Tanács is the Hungarian term for municipality used in the socialist era, meaning council.) A year later he advised Horváth Tibor (script) to work together on adaptational comics, a specific comics genre that would dominate Hungarian comics production for decades. Between 1954 and 1960 he laid down the basis of comics writing and drawing in the country, than suddenly left the field only to return with two Rejtő adaptations in 1970. Gugi could create in many different styles at an equally high quality. He is also known for spending much time researching clothes, architecture, furniture and other details before starting drawing a comic. In 2006 a collection of his works were reprinted in the comic book history series, Fekete-Fehér Képregénymúzeum (Black and White Comics Museum).
- Ernő Zórád (Balassagyarmat, October 16, 1911. - Budapest, April 8, 2004.) painter, cartoonist. Studied at the School of Applied Arts (predecessor of Moholy-Nagy University of Art and Design) in Jenő Haranghy's class, but couldn't finish school due to his family's financial debt. He spent his youth in the army and painting pictures under different pseudonyms for agents. After these years of adventure he made his living as a graphic illustrator for newspapers and magazines (Magyar Vasárnap, Pesti Izé, Szabad száj), at Pajtás he became a regular, where he had to illustrate pictorial stories. While he drew his first comics he illustrated numerous books, but the book publishers disliked his parallel career as a comics artist and did not order more illustrations. Most of his comics were published in Füles (more than 300), Magyar Ifjúság. He developed a unique collage technique for which he received international attention. As a painter his works documenting the atmosphere of the Tabán district of Budapest are the most acknowledged. For a long time he did not think much of comics in general, but eventually became one of the medium's greatest Hungarian creators. He is also known as one of the major artists in the field of Hungarian filmstrip tales and stories.
- Pál Korcsmáros (Budapest, May 22, 1916. – Budapest, May 24, 1975.) graphic artist, cartoonist. Growing up in a poor family, Korcsmáros made profit of his artistic talent early in his life: he worked in the movie factory besides scene-painter, József Pán and ceramist, Margit Kovács. In 1944 he prepared many false identification cards and Swedish protection notes (Schutzpass), together with his poet friend, Géza Képes saving dozens of lives. After the war he worked for Kossuth Népe, Friss Újság, Képes Figyelő. He became popular via his slightly erotic Pasha-caricatures published in Pesti Izé. Béke és Szabadság, than Szabadság featured his first pictorial stories, than from the first issue of Füles in 1957 he drew comics. His graphic style combines naturalist and cartoon characteristics brought to its highest level in his Jenő Rejtő adaptations, popular to this day. Comics artist, graphic designer, Dávid Cserkuti wrote the following about Korcsmáros's art: "His characters are unmistakable for each other, they are so substantive. The reader has the feeling that the artist knows all of them personally – not superficially, but even their slightest weaknesses. […] His order of lines are unique, completely set to the drawings, severe. Not the instrument dominates the style of inking, but he is capable of adjusting it to the world of his pencil drawings. I hardly know any other artist, who could keep the original pencil drawings' liveliness, eventuality on the final ink art."
- Imre Sebők (Apostag, 6 August 1906 – Budapest, 14 September 1980) painter, cartoonist, graphic artist. After art schooling at Jenő Feics and Tibor Pólya, Sebők studied at the Academy of Fine Arts under the instruction of Oszkár Glatz and Aurél Bernáth, but left school after two years for financial reasons. Besides being a regular illustrator at Tolnai világlapja (Tolnai's world magazine), his illustrations were frequent at Délibáb (Mirage), Ünnep (Holiday), Párizsi Divat (Parisian Fashion), Magyar Cserkész (Hungarian Boyscout). His first "subtitled" pictorial stories were published in Gyermekvilág (Child World) in 1942. His painted covers and illustrations for magazines and pulp novels made him widely known, earning an invitation to draw Tarzan comics in Canada, but he did not accept the offer. Besides Pál Korcsmáros, after 1945 he became one of Pesti Izé (Pest Whatchamacallit)'s star illustrator, with slightly erotic images. His comics (usually adaptations written by Tibor Cs. Horváth) were mostly published in Magyar Ifjúság (Hungarian Youth) (after 1958), Népszava (People's Voice) (after 1962). After 1966, exhausted by the daily strips for Népszava, his art became less detailed, sketchy. The daily rush being already behind him made it possible for the artist to reach his second peak from 1973 till his death in 1980. His style is closest to Alex Raymond and Burne Hogarth with the difference that he never made a compromise in favor for better understanding and vendibility. A master of anatomy, his characters' movement are perfect, the static view points are counterpointed by dramatic lighting compositions and emphasized expressive hand gestures.
- Attila Dargay (Budapest, June 20, 1927 – Budapest, October 20, 2009) animator, cartoonist. After finishing the Academy of Fine Arts in 1948, he became a scene-painter at the National Theatre. He started dealing with animations since 1951 and became a director in 1957. For financial reasons he accepted extra jobs in the field of printed media, eventually in the form of drawing comics mainly for Tábortűz (i.e. The Adventures of Sir Lancelot), than Pajtás (i.e. Kajla). From the start, Dargay developed a work-model similar to animation production: Tibor Csermák made the sketches, Dargay the drawings and Ferenc Dlauhi was responsible for inking. He made the comics versions of many of his animations, some of them published before the animation movie came out (i.e. Vuk). According to Sándor Kertész, he was the only major Hungarian cartoonist of the time, who used all the characteristics of comics with full awareness – albeit his true field was animation. His covers and vivid crowd-scenes are inimitable, while his drawings resemble the kindness and grace of Walt Disney productions, a far fetch from contemporary art of Zórád, Sebők and Korcsmáros.
- György Szitás (born: György Szloszjár, Szarvas, April 5, 1926 – Budapest, February 26, 2000) graphic artist, cartoonist. Ernő Zórád discovered his talent at Pajtás magazine in 1951, thereafter he made sketches for characters and background images for art completed by Zórád. His comics were published between 1954 and 1987, mainly sci-fi adaptations, some scripted by himself.
- Róbert Szenes (Budapest, 1932–1971) Graphic artist, illustrator. The artist possessing a great affinity towards mechanics (Note: Szenes illustrated and drew covers for Hungarian DIY magazine, Ezermester for more than a decade.) is known for his precise and detailed sci-fi adaptations made for Füles. A collection of his works were reprinted in 2007.
- Marcell Jankovics (Budapest, 1941–2021 ) animation director, cultural historian, illustrator. After finishing the Benedictine High School of Pannonhalma he wished to become an architect or archeologist, but was rejected twice due to his family background. (Note: In 1950 his father was imprisoned for false charges. His family was deported in 1951 and could only return after two years.) He worked as an unskilled laborer, than from 1960 as an inbetweener at the Pannónia Film Studio. In 1965 he was promoted as an animation director. Sisyphus, directed by him, was nominated for the Oscar Awards in 1974, The Struggle won the Palme d'Or in the short film category in 1977 (to name two of more than forty prizes he won). Between 1970 and 1971 he drew four adaptation-comics (scripted by Cs. Horváth). He described these works as a by-pass in his career, discovering that comics production requires much more work and pays less than animation – as he stated in an interview. Although comics historians and critics praise his works for their art and stylistic diversity, they also agree on that the fact that he did not continue his career in this field, is a great loss to Hungarian comics.
- István Endrődi (Cluj, June 16, 1920 – Budapest, 1988) Cartoonist, graphic artist. Studied at Tibor Gallé and Álmos Jaschik. He started making political and public life caricatures after the war. Ludas Matyi, Füles, Pajtás published his works right from their beginning. Magyar Ifjúság, Tábortűz and Hahota also issued many of his comics.

==== Main publications ====
This list contains those publications, that are emphasized in Hungarian comics history writings.

- Füles
- Népszava
- Buksi (Yugoslavia)
- Pajtás

=== Last decade of communism ===
The popularity of comics streaming into the country made many ask the question: why are not there individual comic book series published? (N.B. at the time the main field of Hungarian comics were still newspapers, magazines.) The Ministry of Culture, the Office of Information and the General Directory of Publishing previously never authorized such attempts. The less harsh tone of the mid- and late-eighties (see Glasnost) brought some changes in the field of comics. Some foreign comics were allowed to be published in Hungarian, not just comics from the Eastern Bloc (e.g. Mozaik) or comics from communist French publisher L'Humanité (Vaillant, Pif Gadget), but some politically 'harmless' series as Asterix and Lucky Luke (as Wilám Will) in Alfa, Tom and Jerry (as Tom és Jerry since 1987), Mickey Mouse (as Miki egér from 1988) and Swedish Bobo and Góliát (both from 1986), Tumak, Pink Panther, Nils Holgerson, etc. One of the most important magazines of the era was Kockás, that selected stories from Pif and its predecessor Vaillant.

A page from Titkok bolygója (1982), a fantasy/sci-fi comics by Attila Fazekas

Again, comics published for the Hungarian minorities in Yugoslavia ranged on a much larger scale: Hägar, larger selection of Asterix and Lucky Luke (in album format), Prince Valiant, Biblical comics, etc. These were popular on both sides of the border, imported both legally and illegally to Hungary.

Most importantly this was the period when Hungarian comics spread from newspapers and magazines to individual comic books, albums. Generally these comics were published in two distinct formats:

- Small (cca. 15 x 21.5 cm), cheap, black and white comic books. These were usually reissues of stories that ran in 4 page installments in Füles. Even the size was the same. Later Attila Fazekas made comics that were published originally in this format. Most notable of these reissues was the Rejtő sorozat sequel, that collected then already classic adaptations of Jenő Rejtő's novels. Despite the fact that these were drastically re-edited by Tibor Cs. Horváth they were very popular, bringing these stories close to another young generation. Among these comic books, most loved were Pál Korcsmáros' art, that captured Rejtő's absurd and grotesque humor. (Some issues were published in 300,000 copies.)
- Large colored albums. These were mainly Ernő Zórád's comics. In some cases they were also reissues, but redesigned, colored by the artist himself. They were published in two unanimous series.

Other important, but short comics were published in the sci-fi anthology, Galaktika. Some of today's artists made their first works here (Marabu, Mihály Vass, István Fujkin). The anthology also published foreign comics as Conan, The Adventures of Funky Koval (Funky Koval kalandjai by polish Maciej Parowski, J. Rodek, B. Polch), Rail tracks leading to darkness (Sötétbe vezető sínpár by Czech Kája Saudek).

It was during this era when comics appeared in the underground scene (concert posters, fanzines, samizdat press). Usually underground creators of the time held comics as a cultural venture, producing few comics (László Rajk Jr., Inconnu Independent Art Group).

==== Notable artists ====
This list contains those comics artists' name, who are emphasized in Hungarian comics history writings.

- Attila Fazekas (Keszthely, July 25, 1948 - ) comic book artist, graphic artist. As a self-taught artist, he made caricatures for newspapers and magazines. His first comic was published in Pajtás, 1972. The staff of Magyar Ifjúság sent him to Ernő Zórád, who discovered his talent, became his mentor and recommended him to script-writer Tibor Cs. Horváth's attention. Via Cs. Horváth he relieved Imre Sebők at Népszava, who was ill at the time. Fazekas is a self-employed comic book artist since 1974. His clear-lined style differed from all other contemporary Hungarian artists'. The new generation of readers could relate more to his graphics, than to those of previous illustrators, whose work might represent a higher artistic level, but are harder to understand. Considering the number and quality of his works, Sándor Kertész describes him as the most important artist of the eighties and elsewhere states that in the seventies he was the only artist who could keep a high level of naturalist style in his comics.
- Ernő Zórád (see previous chapter's Notable artists section)
- Attila Dargay (see previous chapter's Notable artists section)
- Lívia Rusz Rusz (Cluj, September 28, 1930 – ) comics artist, illustrator, painter. Between 1949 and 1955 she studied painting at the Andreescu School of Fine Art. From 1958 she's a constant contributor at Transylvanian children magazine, Napsugár for thirty years. Her first comics were published here in 1959. In 1964, together with writer, Sándor Fodor they created Csipike, who went through several metamorphoses during the comics and book cycle he starred in. She introduced herself as a comics artist to the Romanian-speaking audience in 1966 with the Flute and Jug (in Arici Pogonici), and The wonderful Wizard of Oz (in Cravata Rosie). (Note: The aforementioned works were published in Hungarian to the Hungarian minority of Transylvania, Romania) Since then her works were published in several Romanian- and Hungarian-language children's magazines and books. After receiving several Romanian and international prizes for her paintings, illustrations and comics, she moved to Hungary in 1987 because of Ceaușescu's harsh minority policies. Settling in Budapest, she soon restarted her career with francophone type comics albums (Miskati közbelép - see illustrated panel, Nem minden arany, ami fénylik), a comics series in Dörmögő Dömötör (Kalamajka) and several book illustrations. Due to her ruining eyesight, she retired in 2000. (Note: Lívia Rusz is also regarded as the most important female comics artists of Romania.)

==== Main publications ====
These lists contain those publications, that are emphasized in Hungarian comics history writings.

Important periodicals publishing comics:

- Füles
- Jó Pajtás (Yugoslavia)
- Pajtás
- Galaktika

Important comic books or comic series:

- Kockás
- Rejtő sorozat
- AZ sorozat - Asterix and Lucky Luke (Yugoslavia)
- Nem minden arany ami fénylik; Miskati közbelép
- Csillagok háborúja (Star Wars)
- Bucó Szeti Tacsi

=== Childhood of democratic Hungary (1989-2003) ===
A comic strip by Három Madár Műhely (Three Birds Workshop) published in the absurd humor magazine, Kretén, 1995. With no substantial orders, the three artists disappeared by the end of the millennium.

First page from Imre Fekete's absurd fantasy comic, Nyakék és az őr (Medallion and the Guard). The art shows Fekete's early style he gave up for a less detailed and more cartoon-like style.

The early nineties were a very chaotic, but exciting and optimistic era in terms of comics. Because no one was told what is and is not to be published, many saw great opportunities in releasing comics. In these years a large variety of comics came into the country (not as direct import, but in the form of translations): all kinds of European, American comics. Although most companies were full of enthusiasm, but only few were strong in capital. In the meantime, the whole newspaper and magazine distribution system went through major changes, leaving magazines in a worse situation. Magazine print numbers dropped by 1 or 2 orders of magnitude. Therefore, most of them disappeared after a few months or years. By 1992 such great series as Menő Manó (Italian comics for teenage readers), Krampusz (Italian comics for adult readers), Hepiend Magazin (Conan, Punisher), Vampi (European and American horror, fantasy, erotic comics) vanished. Besides the inexperience of the small publishing companies, the comics-reading audience might not have been ready for these types of comics. In many cases their true value was only discovered in recent years. (Note: One example: the first Hungarian release of Maus in 1991 did not attract substantial attention, but in 2005 the Hungarian language edition of the Complete Maus made a revelational impact on the industry. Hárs, Géza (January 19, 2005). Hirschler, Richárd (ed.). "Maus: a holokauszt-képregény magyarul - Egerek és emberek" [Maus: The Holocaust Graphic Novel in Hungarian - Mice and Men]. HVG (in Hungarian). Budapest: HVG Kiadó. ISSN 1217-9647.)

This was not the case for superhero comics. In the last months of the People's Republic of Hungary American superhero comics finally were allowed to be published. The first superhero story was published in 1989, in a special issue of Alfa magazine. This was the Revenge of the Living Monolith (A monolit bosszúja), a Marvel team-up story. Also in 1989, after a few years of publishing foreign children's comics (Bobo, Góliát, Pink Panther, Tumak, Pejkó, etc.) Interprint plunged into superhero comics. First The Phantom, than Spider-Man. (In 1991 Interprint joined the Swedish Semic group, which resulted in Semic-Interprint.) The company started releasing Batman in January 1990 and Superman later in the same year. DC comics were not as popular as Marvel superheroes, so the titles merged and were made bimonthly in 1992 as Superman és Batman. X-Men started in June 1992 and Marvel Extra (a compilation of all sorts of Marvel superhero stories) in February 1993.

Young readers' interest is considered to have drifted from Hungarian comics to superhero comics. Attila Fazekas, whose Star Wars adaptations were printed in 300,000 copies a decade earlier, now tries every way to remain on the surface. He produced and published his own magazine, Botond. These comic books comprised all kinds of stories, from historical to action. Every issue had a story of Botond, a character based on Hungarian legends and Asterix. He also experimented with erotic comics – with small success. (Note: The series canceled after two issues. Fazekas admitted on the June 2005. KKK club meeting, that he received more copies from his Szexi comic book, than he gave the Hungarian Postal service (the main distributor of magazines at the time).)

With no major outlet, Hungarian comics started to fade. To this day many directly accuse Semic Interprint and its monthly "dump" of superhero comics for this phenomenon. As the country's leading comic book publisher, Semic Interprint never published a Hungarian comic book in these fragile years (cf. after WWII France - and many other West European countries - had an anti-American self-protective law, a foundation of their flourishing comics culture). Others protect it on the basis of free market. (Note: The controversy has not been dealt with in writing, although it is a regular topic on Internet forums, comic club meetings, interviews with artists, etc. Sándor Kertész is planning to publish a book dealing with the comics history of Hungary since 1989. In this book he also plans to deal with this issue.)

Füles and new crossword puzzle magazines are still popular in Hungary, but comics readers' attention has drifted away from these, leaving the collecting of the comics published in these to hardcore, and mostly veteran fans.

In 1996 Marvel went bankrupt and drastically raised the royalties collected upon translations, therefore Hungarian Marvel titles were canceled in December 1996 (Marvel Extra) and January 1997 (X-Men, Transformer). However the most popular title, Csodálatos Pókember (Amazing Spider-Man), managed to survive. In the same year Semic Interprint started publishing Spawn as a bimonthly with two stories in each issue. In 1999, after its tenth year, 120th issue the company doubled the magazine's number of pages (from 32 to 76) and price too. Every issue contained three complete Spider-Man stories (The Amazing Spider-Man, Peter Parker Spider-Man, Webspinners Tales of Spider-Man – all starting out from #1). The stories did not fulfill the Hungarian needs and the price seemed to be too high, resulting in the canceling of the title at the end of the year, along with Spawn. (Note: As can be seen at db.kepregeny.net database, the price of Pókember #119 was 328 HUF, the price of #127 (final issue) was 750 HUF at a time, when no comic book's price went over 400 HUF.) The price of the bimonthly, not so popular Superman és Batman managed to continue until December 2001, as the only superhero title published in Hungarian.

In 2001 Csodálatos Pókember was relaunched, but instead of carrying on with the Spider-Man continuity, it served a younger audience with the translations of Ultimate Spider-Man. Leaving Kretén and the bimonthly Star Wars out of account, Semic Interprint shifted to the children's audience with other flagship titles such as Dragon Ball (cancelled soon after), Garfield, and Dörmögő Dömötör. Children's comics were the main profile of major publishers like Egmont (Tom és Jerry, Donald Kacsa magazin) and smaller companies such as Abrafaxe Kft. (Mozaik - later continued by N-Press, than Ratius).

=== Recent revival (2004-) ===
After the comic book boom of the 1990s comics fans witnessed a fast downfall around the turn of the Millennium. 2003 can be regarded as the low-point in the scene, when 117 individual comic publications were issued throughout the whole year. The vast majority of these comics were children's comics sold at newspaper stands. By 2003 a generation reached their adolescence with no substantial comic book intake, and the generation that once grew up on superhero comics was left with hardly any comics since the late nineties and more importantly: reached their young adulthood. Looking back, the total lack of a comic book scene in the early 2000s proved to have a cleansing effect and pushed many to rebuild the whole scene from its base. The first to act were remaining hardcore fans, who began to organize into web communities on Internet forums and a new scene developed on the basis of scanlations. Since no comic books were sold on the market, fans began to scan, translate, re-letter and share digital comics. In English speaking countries scanlations usually refer to manga, but in Hungary the process of fan translations and lettering started with Marvel superhero-type comics, and then moved on to other types. The most notable achievement of the Hungarian scanlating scene was that it brought together the fans, forming a base of comics fandom. Although many different websites existed, each specializing in different comics genres, types (European, superhero, independent, manga, underground, etc.), Kepregeny.net managed to unite all different kind of comics fans. Kepregeny.net also started out as a scanlating and scanning website, its forum provided a platform for fans and professionals (artists, editors of earlier series, retailers etc.) to meet and discuss all kinds of issues. Many projects were eventually launched from there, and to this day it is a place for fan talk and professional debate and most notably Kepregeny.net can be regarded as the main information gateway for all comics fans and professionals.

2004 can be regarded as the breakthrough year in comics publishing. In February the Complete Maus was released by Ulpius-ház, a larger publishing house. (The first book of Maus has already been published in the early nineties.) Besides the release of the graphic novel, Ulpius organized an exhibition which exposed pages from Maus in Budapest's subway carts, seen by one million passengers a day. The project became successful, and attracted large media attention. This project was timed for the 50th anniversary commemoration of the German occupation in March 1944, resulting in the deportation of 800,000 Hungarian Jews and other minorities. (This also is revealed in the graphic novel.)

Another milestone of the year was the publication of the Belgian album series, XIII. This, along with Largo Winch has already been introduced to the Hungarian audience in 1995 as part of the X-07 black and white series in American comic book format.

That year also brought some changes in Hungarian comics:

- Endre Sarlós' Szigetvár ostroma (a historical album about the Turkish siege of Szigetvár in 1556) was published and sold at newspaper stands. Unfortunately the pages originally composed in landscape format, were reorganized to portrait A4 format and were paired with weak lettering.
- Attila Fazekas' Botond revived after an 11-year hiatus.
- After a long time the first underground comic book anthology, PTSD antológia appeared.
- A group of graphic artists joined forces as Magyar Képregény Akadémia (Hungarian Comics Academy – a rather self-ironic name).
- Képes Kiadó, the publishing company of Pál Korcsmáros' son and grandson started into a series in which the original Korcsmáros and Rejtő classic comics were rearranged into European styled colored albums. The texts were rewritten, the drawings supplemented and corrected where needed, and colored by the team of Zsolt H. Garisa and Zoltán "Zerge" Varga. This series has started in 2003, but 2004 brought larger recognition.

Since then many smaller publishers, usually based around one or a few fans themselves, made ventures in releasing comics. These companies provide a very broad variety of comics, some specializing on smaller territories (manga, American mainstream), others representing a larger scale. In 2005 most of these companies forged into the Magyar Képregénykiadók Szövetsége (Hungarian Comic Publishers' Association), based more on mutual interests and friendship, rather than strict rules and codes. Organizing festivals and fairs can be considered as the organization's biggest success.

Publishers soon realized that in most cases the newspaper market is far from ideal for comics, however it might be feasible on the book market. This however is a phenomenon seen in many other comic cultures. In the last few years only three companies made efforts on the newspaper market: Panini Comics Italy (four, later two Marvel titles) and Képes Kiadó (a black and white budget magazine called Eduárd fapados képregényújság) both failed at it, however Pesti könyv still sends its Lucky Lukes to the newspaper stands (beside bookstores). Bookstores have a constantly growing variety on graphic novels, trade paperbacks, albums, etc. This phenomenon is still new for many Hungarians, since they were used to searching for comics at the newspaper stands/shops, tobacconists, etc.

In a country with a population around 10 million, these 'books' are published in 2 to 5000 copies, which is extremely low, causing relatively high prices. Despite the low number of copies, comics and the theme of its revival has been a frequent topic of the media. In spite of this, prejudice concerning comics fades very slowly.

Also during this period, comics' own offline printed media has been born in the form of semi fanzine-semi professional papers as Panel, Buborékhámozó (bubble-peeler).

The first significant amount of manga were published in the last quarter of 2006 and by the end of 2007, it flooded the comics market, being the most popular among them. Unlike the second most popular type of comics – superheroes – manga fans have their own fan groups, conventions, and are less interested in other type of comics.

== Scene ==
=== Comics published, variety ===
Generally mainstream American and manga comics receive the largest attention from the consumers, but the large number of small publishers ensure a wide and colorful variety of comics.

==== Manga, Japanese comics ====
In 2006 13,8% of the comics published that year for the bookstore market were related to manga/global manga. Although not too many manga were published in 2006, it was the breakthrough of that particular genre, style, stream with rapidly growing publication numbers. By 2009 58,1% of the comics published for that same market were manga. Apart from a few exceptions, manga published in Hungary usually come from the shōjo and shōnen demographic genres (primarily shōjo). Seinen manga are not as frequent as the prior two demographic genres, some examples include Berserk, Vampire Hunter D, Dominion, Who fighter with Heart of Darkness, Blade of the Phantom Master, Hoshi no Sabaku. (Latter is one of few manga, that's first Western edition was made by a Hungarian publisher.) Rare examples of gekiga comics were published in the international anthology series, Papírmozi presenting works by artists Yoshihiro Tatsumi, Katsuhiro Otomo.

==== American comics ====
In Hungary American comic book publishing dates back to the late eighties (see The last decade of communist Hungary section in history chapter), but until the middle of the first decade of the new millennium these comics were limited to the superhero genre (Batman, Superman, Spider-man, X-men, etc.), children's (well known titles from the TV screen: Tom and Jerry, Disney characters, etc.), humor comics (Garfield). Parallel to the Hungarian comics market moving to the bookstores, publishers put more emphasis on graphic novels. Today Dark Horse Comics and Vertigo titles are just as common editorial picks as DC and Marvel titles. Many groundbreaking, cult comics, graphic novels have their Hungarian edition (i.e. Sandman, Batman: Year One, Sin City, Watchmen, Understanding Comics, Maus, etc.) In 2006 31.3% of the comics published for the bookstore market were of American origin (claiming the highest portion), in 2009, despite the fact that the number of American comics grew by 80%, the portion of the total numbers released for the bookstore market decreased to 20.9%. In connection with American comics in Hungary it is important to point out, that more than half of the comics on the newsstand market are of American origin. A large portion of these are magazines dedicated to popular cartoon series (Tom and Jerry, Cartoon Network magazine, Sponge Bob, Scooby Doo, etc.) In 2016 Frike Comics started to publish OUTCAST, from IMAGE Comics and Robert Kirkman. Until now 4 issues have been published with good response by the market. ( The original Volume I)

==== European comics ====
Although publishing and distributing European comics dates back to a longer period of time than of American comics (see previous chapters), since the early 1990s most of these comics could not reach the popularity of superhero comics. From the mid nineties to 2004 German Mosaik was the only major European comic book title published in the country. Today many Francophone albums are published in Hungarian, but their print numbers range from a few hundred to one or two thousand. The future of these titles depends much on the enthusiasm and dedication of the editor and publisher.

Despite previous publications, Bonelli titles could not reach substantial popularity. Dampyr, which started as an experiment to test cheaper Italian pulp comics, closed after six issues.

In 2006 17.2% of the comics released for the bookstore market were of European origin, in 2009 this ratio was 12.8% (the gross number of publications on the bookstore market grew 3 times between 2006 and 2009). European comics constitute a substantial portion of the comics published for the alternative market: 36.2% of the comics on that particular market were of European origin in 2009. This is due to a large number of small print numbered, collector's editions of Mosaik books.

Despite the smaller sellings in this field, publishers and editors seek contact with European artists resulting in more offbeat publications from Marcel Ruijters (The Netherlands), Gradimir Smudja (Serbia, France), Alexandru "Ciubu" Ciubotariu (Romania), Risto Isomäki (Finland), two books from Aleksandar Zograf (Serbia), Kati Kovács (Finland), Pieter De Poortere (The Netherlands), etc.

In 2014 Bonelli comics are published again in Hungary, with the debut of Dylan Dog number 1. (Fumax edition with the support of Frike Comics). Dylan Dog under Fumax has been published until number 4. From Dylan Dog number 5, a new publisher is active, Frike Comics. Frike Comics has published Dylan Dog 5 and 6. Also re-proposed Dampyr with a new number 1. Up to today, the new Dampyr reached number 3, Dylan Dog reached number 6 (plus reprint of sold-out number 1). In 2018, Dampyr 4 and Dylan 7 are to come. Moreover, the cross over of the 2 heroes is in program already.

=== Hungarian creations ===
Taking in consideration the wide selection of comics printed in Hungary, comics created by Hungarians only provide a smaller part of the variety. The reason reflects a complex and mainly economic type of problem that has occupied some, for the last two decades. Generally speaking, the small market does not permit the publishing of domestic comics with larger costs than the royalties of foreign materials. Even if the publisher can agree with an author or team of authors, it has to take greater risks compared to the already known foreign product, where the reception could be previously estimated. Artists – apart from very few exceptions – make their living from other related graphic fields such as advertisement, animation, therefore devoted artists work on their comics projects in their free time. This cycle often leasds to artists gaining less practice than their professional contemporaries and a project takes longer to reach its final stage. Naturally, the quality and genre of these works strongly vary resulting in readers view of domestic comics. At this point the vicious circle would close in if not for a few publishers devoted to Hungarian comics. And luckily many artists, artist groups decide to take publishing of their own works into their own hands.

To attract more attention to Hungarian creations, MKSZ founded the Alfabéta prize in 2006 to award domestic authors. (The name ironically rhymes and refers to the Hungarian word analfabéta — meaning illiterate, a common offense against comics readers in the past.)

Comics made by Hungarian creators only make up around 8.1% (2009 data) of the comics sold in bookstores. This ratio is less at the news stands ruled by children's magazine franchises (Cartoon Network, Scooby Doo, Tom and Jerry, etc.). The real field for Hungarian authors is the alternative market, where 31 different Hungarian comics were published in 2009. Cross-word puzzle, humor and other type of magazines and periodicals are still a strong flagship of the country's comics, if not the strongest.

In 2009 83 artists were active in the sense, that their works were published throughout the year. 28 of these artists had under 10 pages of comics published, 21 artists between 10 and 19 pages, another 20 artists between 20 and 49 pages, and 14 artists managed to draw over 50 pages that year. Short comics under 10 pages are a relatively common form of comics, these are usually published in magazines, comics anthologies (most notably Pinkhell, Nero Blanco Comix, Panel specials, Sushi Strip) or the artist's own collection (Balázs Gróf's strips, Marabu's Dodó strip series, Napirajz (Daily Drawings), a cult webcomic series, etc.). Individual graphic novels, comic books from Hungarian authors are not as common, but luckily each year produces a handful of them. Some of the most well known are Lencsilány by István Lakatos, Kalyber Joe Kalandjai (The Adventures of Kalyber Joe) by Roland Pilcz, Spirál by Attila Futaki (also published in France), Noktürn by Dániel Csordás, Gemini Jelentés (Gemini report) by Attila Fazekas and Antal Bayer, Rév: a Hívó (Haven: The Developer) by Róbert Odegnál, Rejtő/Korcsmáros classic comics remakes.

However some editors and journalists believe, Hungarian comics have the potential of recruiting more comics fans and reaching a cult status in Hungary. Editor, Antal Bayer speculates in a forum comment: "At the same time, I'm convinced that a really 'up-to-date' Hungarian comic could reach the cult status, then maintain massive popularity. We've seen how Napirajz moved the people, but we need something more than that for breakthrough. I can hardly wait for the Hungarian comic book which will be received with as much enthusiasm as the latest Rejtő/Korcsmáros reissue."

==== Self-published comics, minicomics ====
As mentioned before, Hungarian alternative and underground comics reach back to the 1970s, 1980s. Usually underground comics appeared in (rock music) fanzines (e.g. Dall-Ass, Genyó Szívó Disztroly). Individual underground comic books only appeared in the mid-2000s with publications as PTSD antológia (2004), Sushi Strip (2005). The first Hungarian fanzine dedicated to comics is Panel (2006). These publications had an encouraging effect on other comics artists. In 2007 a larger boom happened in the field, many young artists chose to publish their own comic books in 30-300 copies. As in the case of other scenes, these works range from alternative to mainstream-like comics. The phenomena continued in 2008. Manga fans are also active in this field. Larger events - especially the annual festival in spring - usually give space to these artists to sell their comics.

=== Artists working abroad ===
Only a couple of Hungarian artists so far have been able to work for Western European or US companies, although previously many classic Hungarian comics (works primarily by Zórád, Sebők, Korcsmáros, Fazekas) were translated and published throughout the world (mainly "friendly" - meaning socialist - countries as Yugoslavia, East-Germany, Cuba, Poland, Czechoslovakia, etc., but some Zórád comics were published in such countries as Sweden, The Netherlands.). The first was Attila Fazekas, back in 1991 (he was the artist on a few issues of the German edition of Ghostbusters). Attila Futaki and Gergely Nikolényi's Spiral appeared in France in 2008. Futaki is the artist for the comic adaptation of the Lightning Thief series of novels published by Walt Disney and the Image series, Severed. Leslie Téjlor's erotic albums are published by the Dutch Sombrero or the Italian E.F. Edizioni. Zoltán Korcsok had a short story published in Heavy Metal Magazine. Henrik Horváth started working as an inker for several independent US companies in 2006, some of his works has been published by Image comics. Judit Tondora works as a freelance artist (pencil, ink), her works can be seen in comics of independent publishers as Optic Comics, Outlaw Entertainment. On some of these projects pages are colored by Roland Pilcz.

=== Media ===
==== Mainstream print ====
Since 2004-2005 comics became a more frequent topic in the press and electronic media. In spite of this, prejudice concerning comics has finally begun to fade away. Comic-book-friendly magazines and newspapers, where comics related articles are more frequent include Beszélő, Magyar Hírlap, Magyar Narancs, Népszabadság, Filmvilág, MoziNet, Műút.

==== Underground print ====
Written periodicals dealing with comics as such, sold at newspaper stands or bookstores do not exist in Hungary, although there are some magazines sold on the direct market (festivals, comic-book stores, etc.). These magazines have a small print number (100–350), resulting in a hybrid between fanzines (editing and publishing by the same person, non-profit, authors not paid) and official magazines (ISSN number, well known experts as authors). Panel (March 2006-) was the first of the kind, followed by Buborékhámozó (March 2007-). About the importance of these small print numbered magazines Gyula Maksa, media researcher writes in his book, Variations on Comics (Változatok képregényre): "Although the comics critique has popped up, but it still hasn't made itself independent from the fine art, non illustrated literature and film critique. This could be also changed by Panel, the so called first Hungarian comics fanzine, which from its start seemed as a transition between the traditional fan magazine and a cultural periodical, that is to say, a prozine."

==== Internet sites and blogs ====
Hungary's main comics portal is Kepregeny.net. The independent portal gathers fans and professionals, acting as a catalyst for many comics projects. The site hosts news, review and photo gallery sections, press archive, bibliographies, and author's webpages.

As in other countries, Hungarian comics blogs can be divided into three main groups: webcomics (i.e. Napirajz – Daily drawing, Fekete Macska – Black Cat, ), blogs of authors (almost all major authors own a blog, where they display new works, experiences, thoughts, etc.) and text based review blogs (i.e. Panel, Buborékhámozó, Heti5képregény). The two main internet portals - index.hu and origo.hu - both have their own specific book/literature blogs, where comics are frequent guests (Könyves blog - Book blog, Kötve fűzve - Bound and stiched). Although it also deals with other fanboy related issues, Geekz blog is considered as a major resource for comics reviews, interviews.

In 2006, HVG magazine's annual blog contest had a separate comics section. In 2007, although comics did not have its own category, a webcomic blog won in the Entertainment category, and another comics text-blog managed to fit into the top ten.

=== Events ===
==== Major events ====
- Magyar Képregény Fesztivál - Hungarian Comics Festival. (since 2005) Annual - supposedly the biggest - event every spring, organized by the Hungarian Comic Publishers' Association. The event's main focus is on the programs (debates, meeting artists, presentations, movies, etc.). The association's prize, Alfabéta is also announced during the festival.
- Képregény Börze – Comics Exchange Market. These events can be regarded as the most fan oriented events, which explains, why these comics markets are frequently mistranslated to comic-cons (comic book conventions). On these events anyone (fans, retailers, publishers) is allowed to sell their own used or new comics. They are held twice a year (spring and fall). The first was held in 2001.
- Hungarocomix. A fair showcasing the publishers' yearly work and products, also organized by the Hungarian Comic Publishers' Association. Usually it takes place a few weeks before Christmas. In 2010 it was merged with the Christmas season anime, video game, role playing events in a large event hall, causing overall mixed critical responses.
- Szegedi Képregényfesztivál – Szeged Comics Festival (Since 2009) The only comics festival outside Budapest to reach higher attendance (in 2010 around 700 visitors) and favorable critical response. The festival is organized by the city library of Szeged and the local comics scene. Held in November.
- Caricature and Comics Auction (since 2005) Auction dedicated to comics and caricature original art. It is held every November in the Műcsarnok since 2005. 2010 was the first year when the auction was not held, although according to the organizers, kArton gallery, it is planned to continue in 2011.

==== Clubs ====
- Képregény Kedvelők Klubja (KKK in short) – Comics Fans' Club. Every last Thursday of the month. They are usually held in kArton galéria. (During late-spring or summer the event has usually been held on the terrace of Kultiplex until its closing; in 2008 the summer scene moved to Szimpla kert.) Every month a theme is discussed and special guests, hosts are invited. The "club" is open to all people, but usually most of the audience consists of veteran fans and professionals.

=== Official organizations ===
- MKSz - Magyar Képregény Szövetség / Hungarian Comics Association (until 2010: Magyar Képregénykiadók Szövetsége / Hungarian Comics Publishers Association) The Association was founded in 2005 by five comics publishing companies (Adoc-Semic, Képes Kiadó, Krak, Ratius, Míves Céh), later most smaller publishing companies joined. Its main goal was to amend the reputation of comics in Hungary, to multiply the number of comics published and to organize an annual comics festival. In 2010 the association decided to reform itself from its base: leaving the word publisher out of its name, it opened memberships status to the public, positioning itself from a publisher's association to a fan association. This move attracted some heavy criticism.
- MKA - Magyar Képregény Akadémia / Hungarian Comics Academy Found in May 2004 as a comics artist collective. Hence the rather self ironic naming the association does not represent any official, "academic" artistic view, and is not involved in teaching activities. MKA's main activities are organizing exhibitions, producing and publishing their own magazine, Pinkhell. In 2010 the organization melted into MKSZ. Although the academy is the only artist collective to form as an official organization, some other artist groups were formed in the past, and many artists choose to work as independents.

=== Awards ===
To attract more attention to Hungarian creations, MKSZ founded the Alfabéta prize in 2006 to award domestic authors. (The name ironically rhymes and refers to the Hungarian word analfabéta - meaning illiterate, a common offense against comics readers in the past.) It is presented at the Hungarian Comics Festival every spring.

Between 2005 and 2009, Kepregeny.net gave place to the annual audience polls. These covered many more topics, not only Hungarian comics, but also translated materials, journalists, etc.

=== Distribution ===
Comic publications fall into one or more of the following three distributional categories: newsstands, bookstores, alternative (similar to direct market). Comics have been shifting towards bookstores since 2004, and the alternative market is widening every year.

==== Newspaper stands ====
Traditionally, comics were sold at newspaper stands. Since 2003, most publishing companies decided to release their comics to the bookstore market. A major exception from this is the group of children's comics and children's magazines. Since 2006 magazines based on cartoon characters and containing gadgets flooded the market. Due to these publications, newspaper stand comics still account for 55.7% of the comics published that year.

==== Bookstores ====
Since 2004-2005 smaller publishing companies have targeted the bookstores for its conditions better suit comic book publishing: smaller copy number required to cover the network, products are longer time in market compared to newspaper stands. (In Hungary a book's average "rotational index" is 1.5, meaning that it takes one and a half years until a book is sold on the market.). In 2003 - about one or two years before the trend started - only 8.6% of the comics published were distributed through bookstores, while 89.7% were sold at newspaper stands. In 2009 these ratios changed drastically: 28.67% of the comics published were purchasable at bookstores, and 55.67% of the comic books accessible at the newsstands. The number of books sold at bookstores grew 8.6 times, while the number of comic books distributed through the newspaper chains grew 1.6 times since 2003. As pointed out previously, not only the number of comics differ between comics sold at newspaper stands and bookstores, but their content, audience, format and prices. (The average price of a comic book at a newspaper stand in 2009 was 716.8 HUF, a bookstore comics' average price was 2177.8 HUF.)

This of course counter-reacts to the type and format of comics published today. For example, after Panini's comic book series Hihetetlen Pókember (Amazing Spiderman) folded in January 2008, a smaller company, Kingpin continued the series at the bookstores in tpb format.

Képregény Nagyker (Comics Wholesale) as a middle-chain helps the large number of smaller companies reach the bookstores effectively. The company also represents the publishing companies at book fares and some other events.

==== Alternative ====
This form covers comic book stores, comics events, direct ordering from the publisher, and shops directly connected with the publisher.

Not only self-published fanzines and comic books, but most small publishing companies rely on this distributional form, since the bookstore distributional system's 45-55% share (wholesale company + bookstore or bookstore chain together) can be reduced or in some cases even eliminated. Another reason why Hungarian publishers prefer direct sales is that the Hungarian bookshop distributional system is based on commission system, where the publisher is not paid in advance by the distributor, only after the sold pieces, while at an event the publisher receives substantial income immediately. This makes larger direct discounts possible, therefore many fans choose to buy their comics at larger comics events (typically the "börze"-s, festivals). This together leads to a yearly routine, where most companies time their publications to the aforementioned larger events. Comics exclusively distributed through alternative methods put out a large portion of the overall number of the comic books published. In 2009 this ratio was 15.67%. The ratio of Hungarian comics published through this distributional form is conspicuously high: in 2009 59.6% of the comics in this network were of Hungarian origin, while 68.3% of the Hungarian comics published were only available through alternative distribution. Therefore, this distributional system is regarded as the primary source for domestic comics.

===== Comic book shops =====
Hungarian stores specializing in comic books are relatively rare, and are usually based on comic book import. Since the mid nineties a handful (1–4) of shops in Budapest have been serving the fan needs exceeding the variety provided by Hungarian publishers (not counting online shops and shops with only a complementary profile of comics). Eduárd képregénybolt (Eduárd comics store) was the first specializing in Hungarian comics and had the widest variety of small print number, self-published comic books. The store closed in 2009, two years after its opening. As of January 2011, Trillian (specializing in current American and Manga titles) can be regarded as the most stable shop, running since 2004.

=== Museums ===
- kArton galéria / kArton Galery Opened in 2001. Gallery dedicated to comics and caricature art. The gallery has the greatest collection of Hungarian original comics art. Besides hosting a few comics exhibitions every year, it organizes the annual comics and caricature auction and is the home of the monthly Comics Fans' Club (Képregény Kedvelők Klubja). official website

== Notable comics industry figures with Hungarian roots ==
Note: the following list contains people who have/had Hungarian heritage but were not involved directly in the Hungarian comics scene. This list is to be regarded as trivia.

- Joseph Pulitzer (Politzer József). — Hungarian immigrant, born in Makó. Newspaper publisher, journalist, editor. Publisher of The Yellow Kid comic strip, one of the first Sunday newspaper comic strips.
- Alex Toth. Son of Hungarian immigrants. Many interviews and colleague's memoirs reflect that he remained intact with his (parents') cultural background. Toth is widely known for his work on Hanna-Barbera cartoons, but he is also regarded as one of all time's top comic book artists.
- Paul Gulacy. Exact Hungarian roots are not known, although his name is a westernized form of the Hungarian surname Gulácsy. American comic book artist, best known for works for DC and Marvel comics.
- Paul Winkler. Born in Budapest. He was the first to establish Disney comics in France, which happened to be the start of French comic books.
- Marcel Gotlib. Born in Paris from Jewish-Hungarian immigrants. The family talked Hungarian until Gotlib was 15. Through his own work and the magazines he co-founded, L' Écho des Savanes and Fluide Glacial, Gotlib was one of the key figures in the switch in French-language comics from their children's entertainment roots to an adult tone and readership. His series include La Rubrique-à-Brac, Gai-Luron, Superdupont, and Hamster Jovial.
- Endre Lukács. Born in Budapest. Drew Donald Duck comics and covers in the Netherlands for 30 years. According to Lambiek, his significance for the Dutch Donald Duck can be likened to that of Carl Barks in the States. Walt Disney complimented him as one of the greatest Disney artists.
- Miriam Katin. Born in Budapest, emigrated in 1957. She has published her work in magazines like Monkey Suit and Drawn & Quarterly, where it gained a lot of acclaim. She often uses her memories of the Russian occupation in the 1950s for her comics.
- Rick Magyar. American comic book artist, inker of many DC and Marvel comics. Exact Hungarian heritage is unknown, although the surname Magyar is from Hungarian (the word actually meaning "Hungarian").
- Alex Blum. Born as Blum Sándor Aladár in Hungary, 1889, immigrated to the United States. As a comic book artist he is best remembered for his contributions to the long-running comic book series Classics Illustrated.
- David Hajdu. Well known and awarded music and comics journalist and a professor at the Columbia University Graduate School of Journalism. Author of books as The Ten-Cent Plague: The Great Comic Book Scare and How It Changed America (2008), Heroes and Villains: Essays on Music, Movies, Comics, and Culture (2009).
