= Buster (sport comic) =

Swedish comic book

Cover of the Finnish language Buster magazine 1/1978. In the picture there are Eki Eskelinen from Harjumäen sisu (top-left corner, in Swedish: Edward Engmark / Åshöjdens BK), Buster (top-right), Benny Kultajalka (center, Billy Dane, Benny Guldfot) and Super-Mac (lower-right, Hot-Shot Hamish)

Buster was a sport comic magazine published in Sweden, Norway, and Finland in the period 1967–2005.

== Publication history ==
In Sweden, Buster was published from 1967 to 2005, first by Centerförlaget (1967–1970), then by Semic Press (1970–1997), and finally by Egmont Publishing (1997–2005).

In Norway, Buster was published from 1972 to 1977 (successively by Romanforlaget, Nordisk Forlag, and Semic), and then a new series, also by Semic, ran from 29 May 1984 to Summer 1994.

In Finland, Buster was published from 1972 until the 1980s.

== Overview ==
At first most of the material was taken from the UK edition, but as time went on the magazine produced more and more original material, with the focus relatively soon concentrated on British sport comics. This included "taking over" the Buster comic strip itself and changing the main character's appearance to a more typical sport-interested teenager instead of the son of Andy Capp.

Other comics included many series from the British comic Tiger (with a heavy football theme), for example Roy of the Rovers, Johnny Cougar (Johnny Puma), Curly Kayoe (Knock-Out Charlie), Hot Shot Hamish (Super-Mac, a football hero with his Great Cannon shot), Billy's Boots (Benny Guldfot) and Åshöjdens BK, one of the few Swedish produced comics.

== Sources ==
- Buster at the Grand Comics Database Sweden (Centerförlaget)
- Buster at the Grand Comics Database Sweden (Semic)
- Buster at the Grand Comics Database Sweden (Egmont)
- Buster at the Grand Comics Database Norway (Romanforlaget)
- Buster at the Grand Comics Database Norway (Nordisk Forlag)
- Buster at the Grand Comics Database Norway (Semic, 1977)
- Buster at the Grand Comics Database Norway (Semic, 1984–1994)
