= Centerförlaget =

Swedish comic book publisher

- Parent company: Press & Publicity AB
- Status: Defunct, 1970 (acquired by Semic Press)
- Predecessor: Seriemagasinet Förlag
- Founded: 1948
- Country of origin: Sweden
- Publication types: Comic books
- Fiction genres: adventure, superhero, funny animal, humor, romance, Western, war comics

Centerförlaget (first known as Seriemagasinet Förlag) was a Swedish comic book publishing company that operated from 1948 to 1970. It is considered the first Swedish comics publisher. A division of the Swedish magazine king T. Armas Morby's company Press & Publicity AB, the company mainly published translated versions of American and European comics.

The company's first title, and one of its longest-lasting, was Seriemagasinet (The Comic Strip Magazine), launched in 1948 and running more than 818 issues. Other long-running titles included the Western titles Min melodi (My Melody) (534 issues, 1949–1962), Cowboy (659 issues, 1951–1970), Vilda västern (Wild West) (863 issues, 1952–1969), and Prärieserier (Prairie Series) (767 issues, 1953–1968). Most of these comics were originally published in the United Kingdom, France, Belgium, and Italy.

Seriemagasinet Förlag changed its name to Centerförlaget c. 1956; by this time the company controlled 30% of Sweden's comic book market.

The company published translated versions of the DC/National superhero titles Superman (launched in 1949), Batman (1951), and Superboy (1959), as well as the Western title Tomahawk (1951). In 1969, Williams Förlags AB, the Swedish comics and magazines publishing division of Warner Communications — at that time the corporate owner of DC — re-acquired and continued publishing those titles.

In 1970 Centerförlaget was acquired by Semic Press; most titles were cancelled but a few were continued by Semic, including Hacke Hackspett (Woody Woodpecker), Buster, Serie-nytt, and the long-running Seriemagasinet. (In 1975, Semic acquired Williams Förlags AB, continuing the DC superhero/Western titles Centerförlaget had launched in the 1950s.)

== Titles published (selected) ==
Titles with at least 100 issues published

=== Adventure/superhero ===
- Läderlappen och Robin (Batman and Robin) / Läderlappen (Batman) (212 issues, 1951–1969) — changed title in 1956; continued by Williams Forlag; later acquired by Semic Press
- Seriemagasinet (818 issues, 1948–1970) — continued by Semic Press
- Stålmannen (Superman) (398 issues, Sept. 1949–1969) — continued by Williams Forlag; later acquired by Semic Press
- Stålpojken (Superboy) (139 issues, 1959–1969) — continued by Williams Forlag; later acquired by Semic Press

=== Funny animal/humor ===
- Hacke Hackspett (Woody Woodpecker) (455 issues, 1954–1970) — continued by Semic Press
- Vicky (275 issues, 1956–1969)
- Vicky-biblioteket (115 issues, 1959–1963)

=== Romance/girls' comics ===
- Fickbiblioteket (163 issues, 1961–1969)
- Min melodi (534 issues, 1949–1962) — Western/romance
- Min melodis hjärtebibliotek / Hjärtebiblioteket (401 issues, 1953–1969) — changes title in 1959
- Nicky-biblioteket (130 issues, 1963–1969)
- Tony (216 issues, 1960–1969)

=== War ===
- Kommandoserien (176 issues, 1962–1969)
- Seriebiblioteket (233 issues, 1959–1969)
- Spion 13 (126 issues, 1964–1970) — continued by Semic Press

=== Western titles ===
- Cowboy (659 issues, 1951–1970)
- Prärieserier (767 issues, 1953–1968)
- Tomahawk (222 issues, 1951–1969) — continued by Williams Forlag; later acquired by Semic Press
- Trio (153 issues, 1960–1963)
- Vilda västern (863 issues, 1952–1969)
