= Arthur Ferrier =

Scottish cartoonist and illustrator (1891–1973)

Arthur John Ferrier (15 November 1891 – 27 May 1973) was a Scottish artist, illustrator and cartoonist. He was best known for his glamour cartoon strips and pin‑up drawings, which appeared in British newspapers and magazines for more than forty years, including the Sunday Pictorial (later the Sunday Mirror), the News of the World, Everybody's and Blighty. His most famous creation was Our Dumb Blonde (also called Phyllis, Our Dumb Blonde), which ran from 1939 to 1946.

== Early life and education ==
Ferrier was born in Glasgow on 15 November 1891 (some sources give 1890) to John Ferrier, an organist, and his wife. From an early age he wanted to draw and to live in London, but his parents encouraged a scientific career. He attended Glasgow Technical College, qualified as an analytical chemist, and became head analyst in the laboratory of a nickel works near his home.

== Career ==
=== Early work in Scotland ===
While still working as a chemist, Ferrier submitted a sketch to Punch. Instead of a rejection slip he received a cheque – more money than he was earning in a week, he later recalled. He began selling cartoons to the Glasgow Evening News and the Glasgow Daily Record. In 1910 he illustrated two books: Songs of Two Cities by Hari‑Kiri (a pseudonym of Robert Browning) and Glints O' Glengonnar by Christina Fraser.

In 1919, after his former editor William Alan McWhirter moved to London to edit the Sunday Pictorial, Ferrier followed. He married Annie Evelyn McGregor Brown in March 1919; she was also an artist and illustrator.

=== London and interwar success ===
Ferrier found lodgings in Bernard Street, Bloomsbury, and soon took a studio there. He contributed regularly to Punch, The Humorist, London Opinion, and The Bystander, and provided story illustrations for The Strand Magazine, The Royal Magazine, The Yellow Magazine and others. By 1922 he was sufficiently well known to become an instructor for the London School of Cartooning, alongside artists such as E. T. Reed and S. Strube.

Ferrier was a regular theatregoer and from 1923 to 1959 contributed cartoon reviews under the title "Ferrier's Searchlight" to the News of the World. He also drew society portraits and, from 1930, produced his first glamour strip, Film Fannie (sometimes Film Fanny), for Everybody's magazine.

=== Glamour strips and pin‑ups ===
Ferrier's most famous strip, Our Dumb Blonde (also known as Phyllis, Our Dumb Blonde), began in the Sunday Pictorial in 1939 and ran until 1946. It was followed by Spotlight on Sally (1945) in the same paper. In 1947 Spotlight on Sally was adapted into a twice‑nightly revue at the New Theatre, London.

During the Second World War, Ferrier's pin‑up cartoons were very popular with British troops. He also drew a strip based on the BBC Radio comedy ITMA (It's That Man Again) for the Sunday Pictorial, working with writer St. John Cooper and lyricist Sam Heppner. Keith Mackenzie, art editor of Associated Newspapers, described Ferrier as "the Charles Dana Gibson of his day".

Ferrier's only daily newspaper strip was The Affairs of Eve (later simply Eve), written by Peter O'Donnell (later creator of Modesty Blaise), which ran in the Daily Sketch from 1953 to 1956.

In 1941, Ferrier collaborated with glamour photographer Horace Roye on Arthur Ferrier's Lovelies Brought to Life by Roye. The book combined Ferrier's cartoons with Roye's nude photography, creating a "medium‑bending artistic collaboration" that placed Ferrier's pen‑and‑ink girls alongside real women. Ferrier was a staunch advocate of drawing from life, and he would arrange his models in a controlled studio setting to produce final illustrations from life – a process expanded upon in his collaboration with Roye.

=== Blighty magazine and later work ===
For more than forty years Ferrier's most regular outlet was Blighty, a weekly magazine originally aimed at British forces. He contributed one or two drawings to almost every issue, including many covers. After the war Blighty continued as a newsstand weekly, eventually becoming Parade and then Parade and Blighty.

From 1969 to 1971 Ferrier returned to the Our Dumb Blonde formula with Sue and Kue for Parade magazine. His last original cartoons appeared around 1970, with a reprint in 1971.

== Artistic approach ==
Ferrier always preferred drawing directly from life, sketching a basic layout to resolve the composition and then posing his models as required. He would dress his studio with specific furniture to achieve the right period effect, reasoning that illustrators should reflect their own time with the same attention to detail as they would give to a historical period. His models included Anna Neagle, Lillian Bond, Miriam Jordan, Renee Gadd, Elsie Randolph and Dodo Watts. He wrote extensively about his methods, down to the types of dip‑pens he used, and much of his practical advice remains relevant to illustrators today.

== Personal life ==
Ferrier was known as a bon viveur and "inveterate party‑giver". His Chelsea studio and mews house in Wilton Row, Knightsbridge, were venues for elaborate fancy‑dress parties attended by show business and society figures, including Prince Philip, Duke of Edinburgh (then Prince Philip of Greece), Laurence Harvey, Peter Ustinov, Zsa Zsa Gabor, and Jon Pertwee.

He was a member of the Savage Club and the Cartoonists' Club. Despite a reputation for shunning photography, he was photographed and filmed on several occasions, including a 1944 British Pathé short titled "Sally drawn from life by Arthur Ferrier", which showed him at work with a pet monkey.

Ferrier's domestic arrangements were unconventional. He was married to Annie Evelyn McGregor Brown ("Molly") from 1919, but from about 1938 lived with a younger woman, Freda, who believed she was his wife and did not learn of Molly's existence until after Ferrier's death.

He died at the Royal Marsden Hospital in London on 27 May 1973, aged 82. An obituary in The Times written by Sam Heppner called him "a man who knew everybody ... a natural comedian".

== Legacy ==
Ferrier's fashionable, long‑legged women and their male suitors were a fixture of British popular culture for four decades. Though very popular in his day, Rian Hughes, who compiled the Pin‑Up Parade anthology, notes that Ferrier is "pretty much overlooked now". His work is held in the collection of the Imperial War Museum (including paintings from the First World War) and the Cartoon Museum, London. He also produced designs for Royal Albert china and commercial work for Bear Brand hosiery, Butlin's holiday camps, and Stewart, Smith & Co. of Chicago.

Collections of his Blighty cartoons have been published by Korero Press as the three‑volume Pin-Up Parade series.

== Selected publications ==
- Arthur Ferrier's Lovelies Brought to Life by Roye (Chapman & Hall, 1941) – photographs by Horace Roye
- Arthur Ferrier's Dumb Blonde (Pictorial Art Ltd, 1946)
- Arthur Ferrier's Showgirl Sirens 1940-1949: Gals! Gags! Glamour! – Volume 1 of Pin-Up Parade (Korero Press, 2025), edited by Rian Hughes, ISBN 978-1-912740-32-1
- Arthur Ferrier's Burlesque Bombshells 1949-1954 – Volume 2 of Pin-Up Parade (Korero Press, 2025), edited by Rian Hughes, ISBN 978-1-912740-30-7
- Arthur Ferrier's Cabaret Cuties 1954-1968 – Volume 3 of Pin-Up Parade (Korero Press, 2025), edited by Rian Hughes, ISBN 978-1-912740-31-4
