= Semic Interprint =

Hungarian publishing company

- Predecessor: Interprint
- Founded: 1988
- Successor: Adoc-Semic
- Country of origin: Hungary
- Headquarters location: Budapest
- Publication types: Comic books
- Fiction genres: Superhero, Humor, Manga, adventure

Csodálatos pókember #1 (1989)

Marvel Extra #17 (1995)

Semic Interprint, now known as Adoc-Semic, is a Hungarian publishing company, located in Budapest. It publishes mainly translated Hungarian comics and magazines. It has been the main comics company in Hungary, and the only source for American comics in the country for over a decade.

== Publishing history ==
Formed in 1988, it started as a Hungarian-Swedish joint venture, incorporating the Swedish Semic Press and the former Hungarian publisher Interprint. It took over former titles and introduced a whole series of American and European comics, never before seen in Hungary, including Spider-Man, Batman, Superman, and The Phantom. Publishing peaked in 1991, when the company put out more than 120 books a year.

After the success of the three well-known American titles, new ones got introduced, such as Transformers, the X-Men, and Marvel Extra, which featured the Avengers, Fantastic Four, Daredevil, and many more. Others were Teenage Mutant Ninja Turtles (Mirage comics), RoboCop, Garfield, and Calvin and Hobbes. Kretén featured mainly works of Hungarian artists; later it translated some material from MAD. Some older ones were forced into joint bi-monthly titles like Batman and Superman. Besides the growing number of comics, there were also unsuccessful moves like the short-lived X-07 magazine, which was meant to feature Franco-Belgian comics like XIII and Largo Winch.

At the end of the 1990s, financial disputes with Marvel Comics (which at that time was bankrupt) led to the cancellations of Marvel Extra, X-Men, and the Transformers, leaving only Spider-Man as the last Marvel character in the country. After this, Semic Interprint turned to Dark Horse Comics and Image Comics. X-Files, Spawn, and Star Wars were launched in 1997. X-Files got canceled after one year, and Spawn in 1999 together with Spider-Man, leaving the county with practically no comics.

In 1999 the company introduced the first manga published in Hungary, namely Dragon Ball, Video Girl Ai, and Sailor Moon. The first two were manga-sized 52 page, monthly titles; Sailor Moon featured the colored Animanga version in a 52-page comic book-sized edition. The ban on Dragonball in Hungarian TV broadcasting had a diminishing effect on the spread of anime and manga at that time, and after the cancellation of Video Girl Ai and Sailor Moon, Dragon Ball also got sacked.

The next big move for the company was the introduction of the hit US comic series Ultimate Spider-Man. Titled Csodálatos Pókember in Hungarian, it got the same title as its predecessor in hope of wider recognition among older comic fans. 2001 also featured a sad event. DC's last representatives, Superman & Batman, disappeared from the news stands.

The years since can be dubbed stagnation at the company. No new regular titles, few one-shots like the Batman movie adaptation got published, but no big investments.

With the Appearance of Panini Comics in Hungary, which also publishes American comics, Semic chose to make Csodálatos Pókember a monthly title.

Adoc-Semic products are available at newsstands (there is no direct market for comics in Hungary). Some back issues are still available from the publisher.

== Published titles ==
Title	Publication dates	Issues	Content
Ai, a videolány	2000	4	Video Girl Ai
Alf	1990	12	Alf
Batman	1990–1993	25	Monthly, later bi-monthly title featuring various stories from Detective Comics and Batman. Issue #1 featured Batman: The Killing Joke.
Bobo	1986-1992	53	Bobo, the Swedish comic.
Bolondos dallamok	2003	1	A one-shot with the crew from Looney Tunes.
Csodálatos Pókember	1989–1999	127	One of the company's longest-running comics, featuring Spider-Man stories from The Amazing Spider-Man, Spectacular Spider-Man, Web of Spider-Man, and Marvel Team-Up.
Csodálatos Pókember Album	1990–1991	2	Oversize annuals featuring Marvel Team-Up stories with Spider-Man.
Csodálatos Pókember: Sikoly	2005	1	A 96-page one-shot featuring the legendary Shrieking story from The Amazing Spider-Man.
Csodálatos Pókember vol. 2	2001-2010	90	Ultimate Spider-Man
Csodálatos Pókember vol. 3	2011	2	Featuring Spider-Man stories from The Amazing Spider-Man.
Dragon Ball	2000–2001	16	Dragon Ball manga split into 52-page monthly manga size comics.
Falomlás	1989	1	A one-shot about the fall of the Berlin Wall.
Fantom	1987–1992	24	Stories from the Swedish The Phantom, Fantomen.
Fantom Album	1990	1	An oversized album of collected The Phantom strips.
Flintstone család	1990	6	The Flintstones
Garfield	1990-2011	253	Various Garfield strips collected in a monthly comic book format.
Garfield zsebkönyv	1991-2010	97	Garfield strips in pocket-size books
Góliát	1986–1992	52	
Góliát Album	1988–1991	3	
James Bond	1988–1989	6	Black and white James Bond stories plus
Juli, Klári, Cili	1991	1	One-shot with French comics.
Képregény Koktél	1994	6	Calvin and Hobbes strips collected into comic volumes.
Kretén	1993-2009	100	A humor magazine, mainly with Hungarian artists' works. It has a regular MAD section.
Lobo	1999	2	Short-lived title about the DC Comics character Lobo
Lobo & Maszk	1999	2	Team-up of Lobo and The Mask.
MAD	1997	6	Stories from MAD magazine.
Maja, a méhecske	1990	12	
Marvel Extra	1993–1996	24	Various stories from Marvel Comics featuring The Avengers, Iron Man, Daredevil, Fantastic Four, Hulk, Spider-Man and partially events, like Secret Wars, Inferno, and Kraven's Last Hunt.
Nils Holgersson	1988–1992	49	Nils Holgersson
Pókember - A sors hálójában	2005	1	A Spider-Man one-shot.
Pókember mozifilmek	2002	2	Comics adaptations of the Spider-Man movies.
Robotzsaru	1990–1993	13	Marvel's RoboCop comics.
Rózsaszín Párduc	1987–1992	41	Pink Panther comics.
Sailor Moon	1999–2000	24	52-page monthly color animanga about Sailor Moon
Snoopy	1997	2	Snoopy
Spawn - Az ivadék	1997–1999	18	Todd McFarlane's Spawn
Star Wars	1997–2011	82	Bi-monthly title featuring various Star Wars stories from Dark Horse Comics.
Star Wars film adaptációk	1999–2005	3	Comics adaptations of the Star Wars movies
Superman	1990–1992	18	Monthly (later bi-monthly) Superman title, featuring stories from The Man of Steel, Action Comics, and Superman vol. 2
Superman & Batman	1992–2001	54	Bi-monthly book featuring stories from Action Comics, Superman vol. 2, Superman: The Man of Steel, Batman, Detective Comics, and Shadow of the Bat.
Szimat szörény	1989	3	Photo-comic about a Hungarian TV show, featuring a hound as detective
Tarzan	1992	4	Edgar Rice Burroughs' Tarzan by Blackthorne Publishing
Tini Titán Teknőcök	1991–1995	38	Teenage Mutant Ninja Turtles (Mirage comics) from Mirage Studios
Tiszta Dili	1994–1997	24	Bimonthly humor magazine with various artists
Transformers	1990–1997	35	Transformers by Marvel Comics
Tumak	1988–1989	15	Tumac, an Incan Indian.
X-07	1995	2	Featuring XIII and Largo Winch
X-Akták	1997	6	The X-Files by Topps Comics
X-Men	1992–1997	36	Stories mainly from Uncanny X-Men
X-Men: X2	2003	1	Comics adaptation of the X-Men: X2 movie

== Sources ==
- Semic Interprint at the Grand Comics Database
