= Lars Mortimer =

Swedish comics artist (1946–2014)

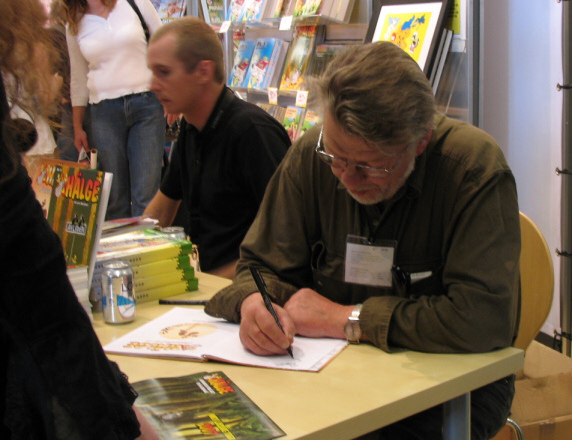
- Lars Mortimer signing one of his books at a Book Fair in Gothenburg, September 2006
- Born: March 22, 1946; Sundsvall, Sweden
- Died: August 25, 2014 (aged 68); Alfta, Hälsingland, Sweden

Lars Mortimer (22 March 1946 – 25 August 2014) was a Swedish comic artist who wrote and illustrated, among many others, the Swedish comic strips Bobo and Hälge.

Mortimer died after a short illness on 25 August 2014 in Alfta, Hälsingland. He was 68.
