= Juniorpress =

Dutch comics publisher

- Founded: 1973; 52 years ago
- Founders: Rob Spijkstra
- Defunct: c. 2015
- Successor: JP Publishing
- Country of origin: Netherlands
- Publication types: Comic books (translations)
- Fiction genres: Superheroes, adventure, war, Western, romance, humor
- Imprints: Baldakijn Boeken

Juniorpress was a Dutch publisher known for its translations of American comic books. It published Marvel Comics, Image Comics, and DC/Cliffhanger comics under its own name, and the imprint Baldakijn Boeken for the publication of DC Comics superhero comics such as Batman, Superman, and the New Teen Titans. It operated from 1976 to c. 2015.

== History ==
Founded by Rob Spijkstra, Juniorpress started as the Dutch-language branch of the Swedish publishing group Semic Press. Although founded in 1973, the company didn't start publishing comics until 1976, with a selection of war, Western, romance, and horror comics, with titles such as Bajonet, Front, Gruwel, Krimi, Marshall, Oorlog, Romantica, and Western. Many of these were reprints of the Dutch publisher Nooit Gedacht.

In 1978, Juniorpress acquired the Dutch-language license to publish Marvel Comics in the Netherlands and Belgium. In the early 1990s, Juniorpress sometimes sold 5,000 copies per issue of its Marvel reprints.

In 1982–1983, the company canceled most of its original titles and changed direction, focusing almost exclusively on translations of American superhero comics. Around 1984, Juniorpress took over the previously independent company Baldakijn Boeken ("Canopy Books"), using this imprint to market DC translations. Juniorpress apparently lost the license to publish DC material around 1996.

Juniorpress lost the Marvel Comics Dutch rights in 2007 to Z-Press Junior Media. (Note: Panini Comics, responsible for awarding the Marvel Comics license, cited the business plan that Z-Press had put together and the publishing plan that they had suggested was much larger than the ones that Juniorpress had been doing for years.) After losing the Marvel Comics license, Juniorpress temporarily canceled its superhero lines. Later the company started again with various licenses, including Lego.

In October 2014, Juniorpress was sold and renamed JP Publishing. Since this company does not publish comics, the few remaining Juniorpress titles petered out by the end of 2015.

== Titles (selected) ==
- Bamse (89 issues, 1978–1987)
- Bajonet mini-strip ("Bayonet") (75 issues, 1976–1983)
- Batman (78 issues, 1984–1995)
- Front mini-strip (71 issues, 1976–1983)
- De New Teen Titans (20 issues, 1985–1988)
- Oorlog mini-strip ("War") (79 issues, 1976–1982)
- Ponyclub (254 issues, 1985-2000) — comics magazine for female horse fanciers
- Peter Parker de spektakulaire Spiderman (Peter Parker, the Spectacular Spider-Man) (150 issues, 1983-1995)
- Romantica mini-strip ("Romance") (66 issues, 1976–1982)
- De Spectaculaire Spider-Man (Spider-Man) (196 issues, 1979–1995)
- Spiderman (Spider-Man) (135, 1996–2007)
- Super Reeks ("Super Series") (148 issues, 1977–1980) — acquired from Baldakijn Boeken with issue #301
- Superman (119 issues, 1984–1996)
- Tarzan (67 issues, 1979–1981)
- Teenage Mutant Hero Turtles (61 issues, 1990–1995)
- Web van Spiderman (Web of Spider-Man) (110 issues, 1985–1995)
- Western mini-strip (66 issues, 1976–1981)
- Wolverine (89 issues, 1990–2000)
- De X-Mannen (X-Men) (296 issues, 1983–2007)

== Sources ==
- Juniorpress at the Grand Comics Database
