= Parade (British magazine) =

British men's magazine (1916–2007)

- Former editors: Roger Noel Cook (1974–1979)
- Categories: Men's magazine
- Frequency: Weekly (1916–1920, 1939–1972); Monthly (1972–c. 2007)
- Publisher: W. Speaight & Sons (1916–1920; 1939–1943); City Magazines (1955–c. 1971); Williams Publishing/Top Sellers Ltd/General Books Distribution (c. 1971–c. 1979); GoldStar Publications/GSP Press (c. 1979–c. 2007)
- First issue: 1916
- Final issue: c. 2007
- Country: United Kingdom
- Based in: London
- Language: English

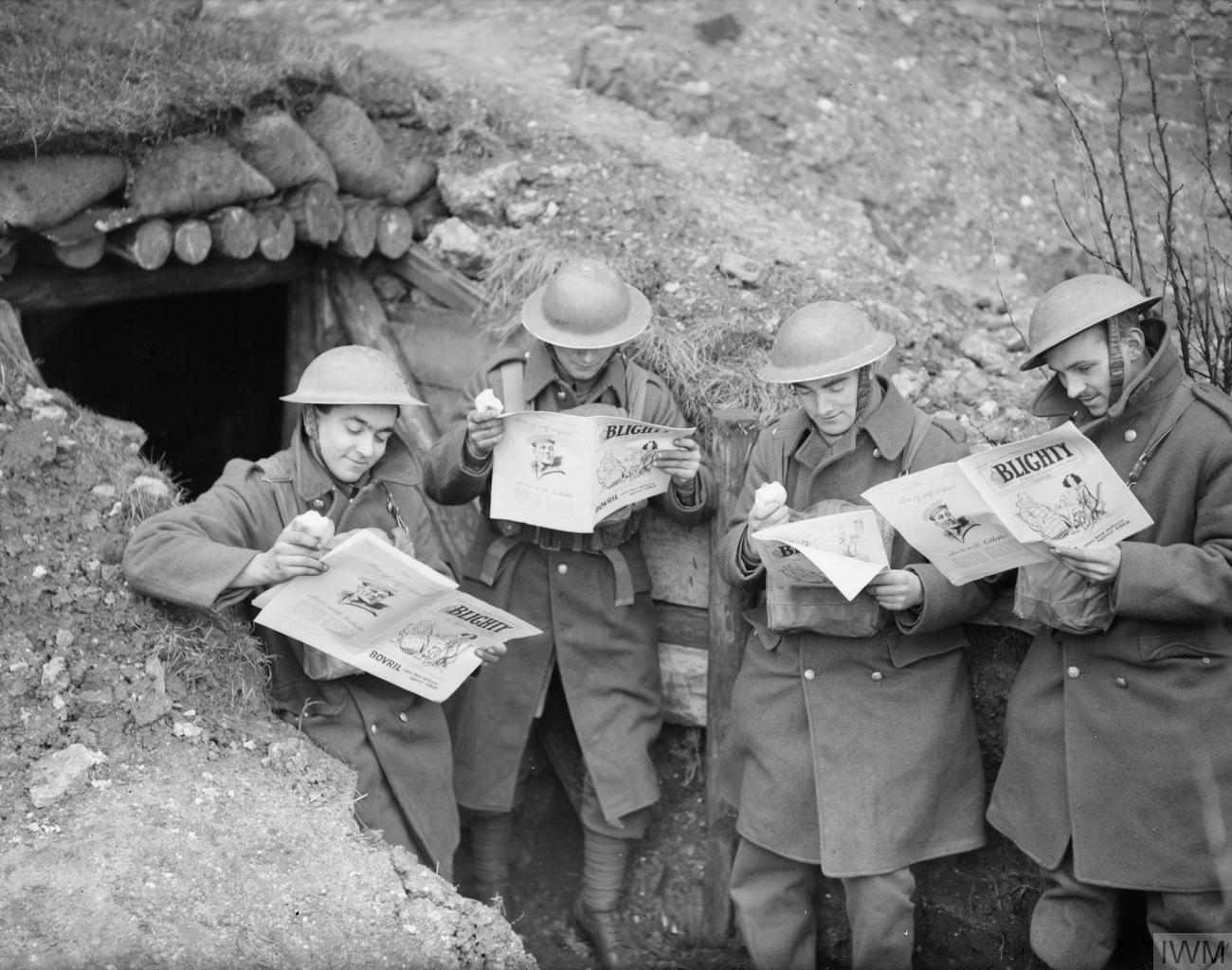
The British Army in France: troops reading copies of Blighty outside their dugout, December 1939

Parade was a British magazine for men. With origins dating back to 1916, the magazine went through a number of different incarnations and different publishers until it went defunct around 2007. It was originally known as Blighty between 1916 and 1920 and was intended as a humorous magazine for servicemen. Relaunched in 1939, as Blighty Parade, it was turned into a pin-up magazine. Arthur Ferrier, a celebrated British artist, contributed significantly to the magazine with his distinctive pinup cartoons, which were often featured on the cover. Renamed Parade in 1960, by the 1970s, content had progressed to topless and nude photos of models, and at the end of the 1990s it went hardcore.

== Publication history ==
=== W. Speaight & Sons ===
Blighty was launched in 1916 by W. Speaight & Sons, intended as a humorous magazine for servicemen during the First World War. ("Blighty" is a British English military slang term for Great Britain, or often specifically England.) The magazine competed against publications such as Tit-Bits and Reveille; it appears to have ceased publication in 1920.

The magazine was relaunched, as Blighty Parade, in 1939, at the outbreak of the Second World War, and featuring pin-ups, cartoons, and stories. It was published every Monday.

=== City Magazines ===
From 1955 to c. 1971 the publisher was City Magazines, and the headquarters were in London.

It was known as Parade and Blighty for the final weeks of 1959, when it finally became Parade in 1960. The magazine's tagline in 1960 was "The man's magazine women love to read."

=== Williams/Top Sellers/General Books ===
City Magazines published Parade until c. 1971, when it was sold to Williams Publishing, the publishing division of Warner Communications. By the 1970s, content had progressed to topless and nude photos of models. In 1972, the magazine went from weekly to monthly publication.

In 1974, the magazine was relaunched with issue No. 1, by Williams' Top Sellers Ltd imprint, as a Penthouse-style magazine, featuring full-frontal shots and nipples on the covers. After a series of raids against its warehouses, in 1978 Williams moved its adult magazines, including Parade, to a new imprint, General Book Distribution.

=== Gold Star Publications/GSP Press ===
Williams went defunct in 1979, and after a series of sales, Parade was later published by Gold Group International (owners of the Ann Summers retail chain of sex toys and lingerie). According to Magforum, Parade was published "under the subdivision Gold Star Publications as a hardcore publication. In 2003, Parade was bought by Andrew McIntyre and the company rebranded as GSP Press."

The magazine appears to have disappeared from the newsstands around 2007.

=== Titles ===
- 1916–1920, 1939–1958: Blighty
- 1958–1959: Blighty Parade
- 1959: Parade and Blighty
- 1960–c. 2007: Parade
