= Roger Noel Cook =

British comics writer, musician and magazine editor (1946–2024)

- Born: 18 June 1946
- Died: 10 March 2024 (aged 77)
- Citizenship: British
- Occupation(s): Comics writer, editor, musician
- Employer(s): Polystyle Publications; Williams Publishing; Paul Raymond Publications
- Known for: TV Comic, Doctor Who comics

Roger Noel Cook (18 June 1946 – 10 March 2024) was a British comics writer, musician, and magazine editor.

== Biography ==
As a teenager, Cook began working at Polystyle Publications in 1962, becoming a staff writer on TV Comic in 1964. He wrote for various series in TV Comic, including Doctor Who, Tom and Jerry and Popeye. His extensive work on the Doctor Who comic has led to him being described as the most prolific Doctor Who writer in any medium.

While at Polystyle, Cook, on lead vocals, formed the band Stud Leather with Alan Kirkham on guitar. The rest of the band were Haydn Gridley on bass, Johnny Aldrich on drums and Dickie Graves on backing vocals. The band was signed to DART (Dart Records) but disbanded after one single, "Cut Loose," which also featured Raphael Ravenscroft on saxophone (who later played the famous sax solo on Gerry Rafferty's "Baker Street"). Cook then released a single with Alan Kirkham, "Slick Go-Getter", on DART, released October 1973.

In c. 1974, Cook became the UK CEO of Williams Publishing, the publishing division of Warner Communications, where among other duties he edited the men's magazine Parade.

In c. 1979, as Williams was shutting down, Cook joined lifelong friend Tony Power at the pornographic magazine publisher Paul Raymond Publications. While there, Cook invented the first video men's magazine, Electric Blue, for which he also wrote and recorded most of the music, forming the band Broadsword for this purpose. Cook later worked for Richard Desmond, taking over Penthouse magazine.

In 2004, Desmond commissioned Cook to write the first tabloid 3D picture strip, called Big Shot, a soccer star soap.

Cook died on 10 March 2024, at the age of 77.
