= Billy's Boots =

Comic strip about Billy and his boots

- Author: Fred Baker
- Illustrator(s): John Gillatt; Mike Western
- Launch date: 1970; 56 years ago
- End date: 1990; 36 years ago

Billy's Boots was a popular British comic strip by writer Fred Baker and artist John Gillatt, later continued by Mike Western. The original Billy's Boots was an earlier humorous series, written and drawn by Frank Purcell, which appeared in Tiger from December 23rd 1961 until July 13th 1963, with a similar premise to this later series. The later more serious Billy appeared in the first issue of Scorcher in 1970, and later moved to Tiger when the two comics merged in 1974. In 1985, Tiger in turn merged with Eagle and the strip moved again. Just a year later, Billy's adventures relocated once more, this time to Roy of the Rovers. New adventures were included in the weekly comic until May 1990 (later followed by reprints), before he switched to Best of Roy of the Rovers Monthly. The strip also appeared in annuals, including annuals for comics which had themselves ceased publication. The strip is still fondly remembered by fans of the "golden age" of British boys' comics. In Finland and Sweden, Billy's Boots was published in Buster magazine. In the UK, stories based on Billy's earliest adventures appeared in Total Football magazine until it closed in 2001, and Billy's story was also reprinted for a few months in the defunct Striker comic.

== Story overview ==
The moment when Billy found the boots, from the first issue of Scorcher in 1970.

The series concerned Billy Dane, a schoolboy and aspiring footballer, who was an extremely poor player until he discovered a pair of old style, ankle high, football boots while cleaning his grandmother's loft. The boots, which his grandfather had bought as a souvenir, had belonged, decades before, to a famous professional striker called Charles "Dead Shot" Keen. In a manner which was never explained in the story, the boots possess special abilities which turn Billy into a fantastic football player when he wore them. In addition to giving Billy the physical skill to score great goals, the boots also granted him the intuition to be in the right place at the time on the pitch, leading him to feel that they have a "mind of their own".

Each week, the strip was introduced with the words, "Billy Dane found an ancient pair of football boots that used to belong to old-time soccer star, "Dead-Shot" Keen. In some strange way, the boots enabled Billy to play in the same style as Dead Shot..."

However, despite the boots' obvious importance to him, he would repeatedly lose them or have them stolen.

The boots fell apart after a few matches due to their age and could not be repaired. Fearing that he would lose his new-found ability and knowing that "Dead Shot" Keen had played for the local club, Amhurst Albion, Billy went to their ground to see if any of Keen's other boots remained there. Having secretly entered the stadium, he found the boot room and discovered another pair of Keen's old boots which, much repaired, he used for the remainder of the story.

The boots endowed Billy with sufficient ability to make regular appearances in schoolboy representative matches, appearing for Southern Schools against their Western, Northern and Eastern counterparts, and the full England Schoolboys team, with whom he travelled on tours to France and Germany.

In 1971, while playing for England in one such tour match in France, the boots split and Billy took them to a local shoe repairer's shop. When he went to collect them, the elderly owner told Billy that he recognised the boots as a pair he had made as a special order for Keen many years earlier. Billy asked him to make an identical pair, as a contingency against future damage or loss of the original boots. When Billy wore the new boots in his school's next match, they did not enable Billy to play in Keen's style, and he missed a penalty, so he had to revert to the original pair at half time with the consequent restoration of his abilities.

Billy was often able to anticipate future events in his own life by reading Keen's book The Life of Dead Shot Keen. Billy's life often mirrored Keen's, such as the time when he came on as a substitute in a school match with his team losing 0-7, and scored 8 goals himself to win the match, or when he accidentally got into trouble by being selected for both sides in a schools' cup final. He had previously read about Keen's similar experiences while turning out for his teams. He was thus able to foresee events and work out solutions to problems.

In February 1971 Billy sat his 11+. Despite his gran forbidding him to play football so he could concentrate on his schoolwork, he failed to qualify for the Grammar School, but achieved a good enough grade to attend the local Secondary School, Kenwood Technical.

Billy lived with his grandmother, but the fate of his parents was only addressed very briefly early on when a teacher offered him a lift to a match if his dad couldn't take him. Billy replied, "M-My dad's n-not alive, sir". In 1973 Billy and his grandmother moved to the village of Groundwood to live with his grandmother's elderly sister Kate, who owned a large house there.

By the early 1980s, Billy was playing as centre forward for Groundwood School, alongside pals such as Jimmy Dawson, Reg Wood, Marvin Soames and Harvey Crisp. The strip regularly involved mishaps involving his boots, which were periodically lost, stolen or damaged, resulting in Billy underperforming and thus being dropped from the school team. In several instances, he turned out for opposing sides such as "Merlin" or "Brand X", scoring against the school first team, thus embarrassing the sports teacher, Mr Harris.

During the strip's run in Eagle, the football element of the story was downplayed somewhat, focusing instead on Billy's exploits whilst on the run from a council home where he had been placed when his grandmother (with whom he lived) had been taken ill. There would often be no football action for several weeks, which was odd given that the central premise of the strip was football-based. When the strip moved to Roy of the Rovers, football once again became the central element in the strip. These years focused on playing for Groundwood School, with the emphasis often placed on whether he could help them win cup competitions rather than needing the boots to be successful.

Keen was also a skilled cricketer, and Billy discovered a pair of his old cricket boots, which had similar beneficial effects on his performance on the cricket field during the summer months.

Despite his adventures lasting for more than 20 years, Billy remained about 12 or 13 years old throughout the storyline, that is until he joined Roy of the Rovers comic, where his final year showed him playing for Groundwood School's under 16s side.

== In popular culture ==
The Wirral-based rock band Half Man Half Biscuit included the line "Is this me, or is this Dead-Shot Keen?" - in reference to Billy's oft-voiced wondering about his ability - in the song "Our Tune" on their 1991 album MacIntyre, Treadmore and Davitt.

In a review of the film Like Mike, the British magazine TV Choice stated that the film would "have some dads thinking wistfully back to the comic-strip days of Billy's Boots", years after it has ceased publication.

The 2000 film There's Only One Jimmy Grimble, starring Ray Winston, Robert Carlyle and Lewis Mckenzie as Jimmy Grimble, bears a resemblance to the strip.

The They Think It's All Over Annual 1997 featured a parody of the strip, Willie's Boots, in which the influence of the boots made Willie resemble a 1930s-era footballer in more ways than his playing ability, until he eventually dies of rickets.

== Translations ==
Billy Dane is called:

- Dutch: Sjakie Meulemans, Swedish: Benny Guldfot, Finnish: Benny Dane, Benny Kultajalka, Icelandic: Kalli í knattspyrnu (Kalli the footballer)

Dead Shot Keen is called:

- Dutch: Voltreffer Vick, Swedish: Kanon-Keen, Finnish: Kanuuna-Keen Bengali (India): Bilash, Bili or Biley.

Billy's Boots used to be regularly translated into Bengali and published in the popular Bengali monthly magazine "Shuktaara" as "Billir Boot", circulated mainly in West Bengal, India. Its Bengali version also appeared in Anandamela Pujo Sonkhya (Festival edition).

Billy's Boots also was published in Turkish in the 1970s as comic series under the name "Sihirli Ayakkabılar" (Translation:Magical Shoes) in a children magazine called "Doğan Kardeş". "Dead Shot Ken" was named "Bombacı Ken" (Ken the Bomber).

== Sources ==
- McAlpine, Duncan, The Comic Book Price Guide 1996/97 Edition (Titan Books, 1996)
- Official Roy of the Rovers website
- Scorcher page at britishcomics.com
