= Semic Press =

Swedish comic book publisher

- Parent company: Bonnier Group (1973–1997)
- Predecessor: Åhlén & Åkerlunds
- Founded: 1963
- Defunct: 1997 (taken over by Egmont Serieforlaget )
- Successor: Bokförlaget Semic
- Country of origin: Sweden
- Publication types: Comic books, trading cards
- Fiction genres: Superhero, humor, Western, adventure
- Imprints: SatellitFörlaget
- Official website: semic.se

Semic Press was a Swedish comic book publishing company that operated from 1963 to 1997. Known for original comics as well as translated American and European titles, Semic was for a long time the country's largest comic book publisher. For many years, Semic published the official translations of American (mostly) superhero comics produced by DC Comics and Marvel Comics. The Semic Group had divisions in a number of European countries — mostly to distribute translated American comics — including Spain, Finland, the Netherlands, Norway, France, Poland, the Czech Republic, and Hungary.

Original titles published by Semic included Bobo, Bamse, FF med Bert, and Swedish treatments of James Bond and The Phantom.

Apart from books, the company also published association football cards, featuring international players of the 1970 FIFA World Cup.

In 1997 Semic was sold to the Danish media house Egmont

== History ==
Semic Press was the comics division of the Swedish publisher Åhlén & Åkerlunds, which was founded in 1906 by Johan Petter Åhlén (1879–1939) and Erik Åkerlund (1877–1940). Åhlén & Åkerlunds published such long-running titles as Vecko-Journalen ('Weekly Record'), Allt för alla ('Everything for everyone'), Allt för alla denna vecka ('Everything for everyone this week'), Året Runt ('Year-round'), Levande livet ('Living life'), Vårt hem ('Our home'), and Veckorevyn. Although many of these periodicals published comics, they usually made up less than 50% of the total pages.

Semic Press was preceded by three prior comics imprints: Alga (1942–1950), Serieförlaget (1950–1955), and Åhlén & Åkerlunds Youth Magazines (1955–1962).

Åhlén & Åkerlunds began publishing comics in earnest in 1942 with Veckans serier ('Weekly series'), a weekly anthology of comic strips published under the Alga imprint. Alga also published the quarterly anthology Algas serietidning ('Alga's comic book') (1947–1950), which often featured Buffalo Bill on the cover.

Under its own name, Åhlén & Åkerlunds started publishing Lee Falk's The Phantom (as Fantomen) beginning with an annual album series in 1944 that is still being published as of 2025.

From 1950 to 1955, the Alga imprint was followed by Serieförlaget ('Comics publisher'), which launched Fantomen as a comic book series as well as launching Blondie, Tarzan, and Buffalo Bill.

Beginning in 1955, Serieförlaget was succeeded by Åhlén & Åkerlunds Youth Magazines, which lasted until 1962. 91:an launched in 1956, while Fantomen and Blondie remained popular. Lilla Fridolf, based on a character from a Swedish radio series which was broadcast in the mid-1950s, joined the lineup in 1960.

Semic Press – its name being a contraction of Serier (the Swedish word for comics) and Comics – was founded in 1963, taking over publication of most of Åhlén & Åkerlunds' comics titles.

Semic acquired rival comics publisher Centerförlaget in 1970, right around when Åhlén & Åkerlunds itself ceased publishing. With the acquisition of Centerförlaget, Semic took over the publication of such long-running titles as Seriemagasinet, Serie-nytt, Buster, and Hacke Hackspett ('Woody Woodpecker').

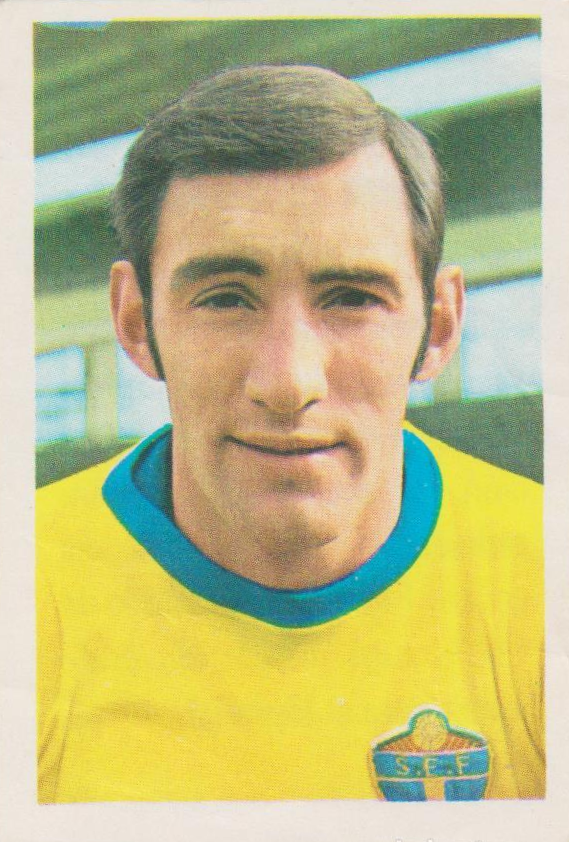
Krister Kristensson football card launched by Semic in 1970

In 1970, Semic Press launched a series of association football cards, the "VM 70" series, featuring international players that took part in the 1970 FIFA World Cup.

In 1973, Semic was acquired by the Bonnier Group.

In 1974, Semic partnered with the Swedish publisher Allers to continue publishing the Western comics series Silverpilen ('The Silver Arrow').

Semic expanded its comics market share in 1975 with the purchase of competing publisher Williams Förlag (the Swedish comics and magazines publishing division of Warner Communications). A number of Williams' titles, featuring DC Comics characters Superman, Batman, Superboy, and Tomahawk – at that point owned by Warner – had been taken over from Centerförlaget in 1969, and were continued by Semic. (Meanwhile, former Williams Förlags employees immediately formed "Atlantic Förlags AB2 in 1975.Atlantic Förlags was ultimately acquired by Egmont Serieforlaget in 2000.)

In July 1986, Semic absorbed the Danish publishers Interpresse (also owned by Bonnier) and Carlsen Comics to form SEMIC Forlagene A/S, with all three publishers continuing to use their prior names. (In January 1991, Interpresse and Carlsen separated into two companies again, with the former becoming Semic Interpresse.)

In 1988, the company formed SatellitFörlaget, which handled superhero reprint translations from Marvel Comics and DC Comics.

From July 2, 1997, all comics releases were taken over by Egmont Serieforlaget; the long-running titles 91:an, Fantomen, Knasen, and Agent X9 are still being published.

Semic continues to exist as "Bokförlaget Semic", but generally does not publish comics. The publication of graphic novels is done through the imprint Kartago Förlag, a company that Bonnier bought from the Norwegian publisher Schibsted and placed as an entity within Semic in January 2010.

== Semic International Group foreign divisions ==
Country	Name	Estab.	Current status	Ref.
Czechoslovakia/Czech Republic/Slovakia	Semic-Slovart	1991	defunct by 1994	
Czech Republic	Semic Media			
Finland	Semic	1966	operated the imprints Semic Press Oy and Kustannus Oy Semic	
Finland	Kustannus Oy Williams	1976	originally the Finnish division of Williams Publishing	
France	Semic Comics	1989	formed from the acquisition of Éditions Lug	
Hungary	Semic Interprint	1988	incorporated the older publisher Interprint; later renamed Adoc-Semic	
Netherlands	Semic Press	1967	eventually became completely independent of the parent company	
Netherlands	Juniorpress	1973	originally a branch of the Dutch Semic Press	
Norway	Semic	1976	became Bonnier Publications/Semic AS in 1995 when it was merged with another Bonnier-owned publisher, Nordisk Forlag AS	
Poland	TM-Semic	1990	changed name to Fun Media in 2002	–
Russia	Семиф (Semif)			
Spain	Semic Española de Ediciones, S. A.	1963	defunct by 1969	

== Titles published (selected) ==
Title	Issues	Pub. dates	Original publisher, debut	Later publisher, cancellation	Notes	Source(s)
91:an	800	1965–1997	Åhlén & Åkerlund, 1956	—		
Acke	327	1969–1997	—	Egmont, 2002		
Blondie	272	1963–1985	Serieförlaget, 1951	—		
Buffalo Bill / Buffalo	358	1965–1984	—	—	Western comics	
Buster	583	1970–1997	Centerförlaget, 1967	Egmont, 2005	Sporting comics anthology with translations of British strips like Roy of the Rovers	
Dennis	270	1969–1984	—	—		
Fantomen	962	1963–1997	Åhlén & Åkerlund, 1944	Egmont	Still being published	
Hacke Hackspett	248	1971–1985	Centerförlaget, 1954	—	Woody Woodpecker	
Helgonet	227	1966–1985	—	—	The Saint comics	
James Bond	203	1965–1996	—	—		
Knasen ('The Crunch')	549	1970–1997	—	Egmont	Beetle Bailey comics; still being published	
Lilla Fridolf	699	1963–1996	Åhlén & Åkerlund, 1960	Egmont, 2006		
Min häst ('My Horse')	514	1976–1997	Williams Förlags AB, 1972	—		
Serie-nytt	246	1970–1983	Centerförlaget, 1968	—	Adventure anthology	
Seriemagasinet	597	1970–1997	Centerförlaget, 1948	Egmont, 2001	Translated and collected comic strips	
Starlet	710	1976–1994	—	—	Girls' romance comic	
Tom & Jerry [Tom och Jerry]	208	1979–1997	—	Egmont	Translations selected from Tom & Jerry Comics published by Dell/Western from 1949 to 1984	
Westernserier	203	1976–1993	—	—	Western comics anthology	
X9 / Agent X9	333	1971–1997	—	Egmont	Still being published	
