= Hot Shot Hamish and Mighty Mouse =

- Mighty Mouse in action in the 1984 Roy of the Rovers annual

Publication information
- Publisher: Tiger
- First appearance: 1973
- Created by: Frank S. Pepper

Hot Shot Hamish and Mighty Mouse were two popular British football-themed comic strips, which later merged and appeared in various publications from the 1970s to the 1990s. Both are amongst the best remembered football characters from the "golden age" of British boys' comics.

Both strips were written by Fred Baker (died 2008) and usually drawn by Julio Schiaffino (born 1936, died 23 June 2016). Hot Shot Hamish followed gentle Hebridean giant Hamish Balfour, the man with the most powerful shot in the world, and began its days in Scorcher in August 1973, before relocating to Tiger when the two titles merged. The comic tells the story of Hamish as he is brought from his remote island home to play for Princes Park in the Scottish Premier Division, under manager Ian McWhacker, and becomes famous for being able to hit the ball so hard that his shot could (and often did) burst the goal net. His character has a powerful frame emphasised by the fact that he always played in a shirt which was far too small for him and which did not reach the waistband of his shorts. The comic's regular supporting characters were Hamish's eccentric father and his pet sheep McMutton.

Mighty Mouse, on the other hand, first appeared in the Roy of the Rovers comic in June 1979, and featured Kevin "Mighty" Mouse. Mouse's character was a successful and highly skillful First Division footballer despite the fact that he was very short, extremely overweight, and wore thick spectacles even while playing. In the comic strip, Mouse managed to divide his time between playing for Tottenford Rovers and studying at St Victor's Hospital as a medical student. At the hospital he lived in fear of ferocious matron "Mad Annie", and his superior, the cantankerous Dr Mender, who also ran the hospital football team that Mouse played for. Mouse is characterized as vastly more skillful than anyone else on his team.

In 1985, after the cancellation of Tiger, most of its strips moved to Eagle but Hamish relocated to Roy of the Rovers and the two strips merged to form Hot Shot Hamish and Mighty Mouse (later shortened to simply Hamish and Mouse). The first episode of the combined strip appeared in the Roy of the Rovers comic dated 6th April 1985. In the storyline, Mouse was deemed surplus to requirements at Tottenford Rovers after the signing of a more skillful player who played in the same position. On a trip to watch Scotland playing, he met up with Hamish, who persuaded him to sign for Princes Park (conveniently Mouse was also able to transfer to a Scottish hospital to continue his studies). In later years, the comic told the story of the pair transferring to Glengow Rangers where they were later joined by McWhacker (who promptly signed a number of their former Princes Park teammates).

The strip ran until May 1990, returned in July of the same year, and finally came to an end in January 1993 with reprints appearing in the remaining issues of the weekly Roy of the Rovers comic.

A rarity among the genre of football strips; the Hamish and Mouse story was extremely humorous in nature with unbelievable and exaggerated tricks and skills shown by the two lead characters, although they never degenerated into out and out pastiche in the style of Billy the Fish. Many characters had humorous names, for example the manager of the Scottish national team was called Mr McBossy. Storylines were often comical and highly far-fetched - one notable example saw Mr. McWhacker attempt to intimidate the Princes Park players into playing better by secretly disguising himself as a monster called "The Claw" and haunting the club corridors, bursting out and warning startled players that they would be devoured if they did not win matches.

Their adventures were also published in other European countries. In France they were known as Hamish La Foudre and Mousie L'Eclair, in Sweden as Super-Mac (Hamish) and Bullen (Mouse), and in Finland as Super-Mac and Pulla.

Hamish was mentioned as 6 feet 10 inches (2.08 metres) tall with size 16 boots.

He was selected to play for Scotland making him Princes Park's first international player. During the match, his hot shot was saved by the opposing goalkeeper who actually caught it in his hands! His first goal was disallowed after a teammate fouled the keeper before he headed it in, but his father went into a rage at the referee and was dragged off by the police. Hamish had possession again giving a much harder hot shot than the first saying "Try this for size!". This time he scored, burst the net, and hit the floodlight post causing the floodlights to collapse onto the pitch.

== Hot Shot Hamish ==
Club Career

In the strip, Princes Park F.C. are the Cinderella of Scottish Football in the 1970s. Overshadowed by the sides of Glasgow, Princes Park languished at the foot of the Second Division of the Scottish League, but manager Ian McWhacker is determined to achieve an improvement in the 1973-1974 season. This happens as the Princes Park team visit the Hebrides, discovering Hamish Balfour, a boy with the figure of a powerful shot. Ian McWhacker says that he could be the signing of the century!

Hamish soon becomes supporters' favorite but after a fall-out with the directors he is placed on the transfer list. Crawford Town, a first-division English club, are the first to sign the new talent, with young Balfour debuting for them in a World Cup warm-up match against a South American team in London. But Princes Park's supporters demonstrate in favour of his return, which is realized shortly after. Hamish gives them a massive compensation: Princes Park win the Scottish Cup for the very first time in their history in 1974, after beating Ratch Rovers at Hampden Park (Scotland's national football stadium).

Within the next six years, thanks to Balfour's fireballs, Princes Park would enjoy promotion to the Premier division, suffer relegation and promotion again. Princes Park return to the first division in the 1979-80 season. Hamish Balfour will give the Cup to Princes Park for the second time in 1982, promotion to the topflight again and two years later he will stand on the high pedestal of Scottish Football, the Premier Division title.

As the comic strip progresses, the Hebridiean giant, having already debuted for the Scotland national team, win his second cap in a match against Iceland in March 1985 under manager Ian McBossy. A distinguished career with Scotland isn't meant to be, but then he met Kevin Mouse, who attends the match in Glasgow. The summer of the same year he helps Pongi FC win a game in Kenyan League while holidaying in Kenya with teammate Wee Wally.

Ian McWhacker has managed to build a strong team with the likes of Hamish Balfour, Kevin Mouse and Wee Wally. The all-conquering trio helped Princes Park be crowned Cup winners in 1987 and reaches the top of Europe the following year by beating Bumchen Munchen in the European Cup Winners' Cup Final. One year later McWhacker signs Mouse and Balfour for his new team Glengow Rangers.

Winning Scottish Cup again in 1990 and the European season, Hamish Balfour's career in Rangers never becomes as glamorous as it have been in Princes Park for 16 years. On 30 January 1993 after a horrible defeat in Scottish Cup, manager McWhacker quits, leaving Balfour and Mouse in doubt over their future in Glengow Rangers.

== 2018 Roy of The Rovers Reboot ==
Hamish and Kevin Mouse later played for Melchester Rovers, Hamish only played for Rovers for a year before accepting a record transfer fee in Spain where he has been living since he retired, while Mouse stayed on with Rovers until he retired eventually becoming Rovers' manager. After Mouse suffers a heart attack near the end of Roy Race's first season as a professional Hamish takes over as Rovers' caretaker manager, his appointment didn't go down well with Johnny Dexter who becomes Rovers' assistant manager, nevertheless with Hamish in charge Rovers earned promotion to League 1 via the playoffs with Dexter's help. Hamish later returns to Melchester after Rovers gained automatic promotion to The Championship representing a Spanish based consortium of wealthy property developers that wishes to buy Rovers.

The consortium have aspirations to rebuild Rovers' stadium Mel Park and officially integrate a women's team in Melchester called Sowerby into the Rovers setup which will make Sowerby a full-time women's side, the consortium also appoints Hamish with the position of Rovers club ambassador. Hamish's time as ambassador after Rovers takeover has seen Hamish as a mentor to the younger players, during the build up to the Premier League promotion play off final there was a striker shortage due to injuries and suspensions so Hamish was reactivated as a player which saw Hamish come on as a substitute and scoring the goal that put Rovers back in the Premier League which led to Hamish breaking his leg with the kick that promoted Rovers. He was seen in the stands watching Rovers beat local rivals Tynecaster to win the FA Cup.

== Mighty Mouse ==
Club career

Kevin 'Mighty' Mouse started his career playing part-time for non-league Alftown Hotcakes, where Mouse scored a solitary winning goal in a 1-0 win in the FA Cup 3rd round against League Champions Nottingpool United. Soon after he signed for Tottenford Rovers while studying at St Victor's Hospital, where he was a medical student with a dream to be a distinguished doctor. He played in UEFA Cup with Tottenford Rovers but in 1985 he moved up north to Glasgow teaming up with the gentle giant Hamish Balfour for the sake of Princes Park. He became part of the dynamic trio (Hamish-Mouse-Wee Wally) which sent Princes Park to the seventh heaven when they conquered the Cup Winners' Cup, the greatest accomplishment in the club's history. The final ended in 3-2 score in the favour of Park and Kevin Mouse played a key-role in this tremendous victory scoring one goal.
He would follow Balfour and manager Ian McWhacker to Glengow Rangers five years later helping the Gers win the Scottish Cup.

Managerial Career

Mighty Mouse was installed as the new Melchester Rovers manager in 2018 as seen in the new Roy of the Rovers strip in Match of the Day magazine.

== Sources ==
- Scorcher page at britishcomics.com
- Official Roy of the Rovers website
