= Williams Publishing =

European comics and magazines publisher

- Industry: Publishing
- Genre: Fiction, Humor
- Founded: 1971; 55 years ago
- Fate: Defunct, c. 1979
- Headquarters: Columbia-Warner House; London; United Kingdom
- Number of locations: 9
- Area served: Europe
- Key people: Roger Noel Cook, Dez Skinn
- Products: Comics, magazines
- Parent: Warner Communications
- Divisions: Williams Publishing and Distributing Co. Ltd. (U.K.); Edizioni Williams Inteuropa (Italy); Kustannus Oy Williams (Finland); Williams (Denmark); Williams (Netherlands); Williams (West Germany); Williams France; Williams Forlag (Norway); Williams Förlags AB (Sweden)

Williams Publishing was the short-lived European comics and magazines publishing division of Warner Communications in the 1970s. Headquartered at the Columbia-Warner House in London, Williams had European-language divisions in Denmark, Finland, France, Italy, the Netherlands, Norway, Sweden, and West Germany. Comics titles were for the most part translations of American publications — many of them Warner properties — as well as some U.K. and European titles. Initiated in 1971, most of the Williams publishing divisions were closed or sold off in the period 1974–1979.

== History ==
Williams evolved from Gilberton World-Wide Publications, the European-language divisions of Gilberton, publisher of Classics Illustrated. In the period 1956–1957, at the height of Classics Illustrated's popularity, Gilberton established a number of Northern European branch companies — in Denmark (I.K. [Illustrerede klassikere]), the Netherlands (Classics), Norway (Illustrerte Klassikere), Sweden (Illustrerade Klassiker), and West Germany (Internationale Klassiker) — to translate Classics Illustrated into their languages.

In 1959, Gilberton acquired the British publisher Thorpe & Porter (T & P), ostensibly for the same purpose. In 1962, the production of new issues of Classics Illustrated shifted from Gilberton's New York offices to Thorpe & Porter in London, with the founder/publisher's son, William E. "Bill" Kanter, overseeing everything beginning in 1963. (Note: Bill Kanter had become an editor at Gilberton in 1946. He was instrumental in getting Classics Illustrated distributed nationally in the U.S. through Curtis Circulation, alongside magazines like The Saturday Evening Post, Ladies' Home Journal, Holiday, The Atlantic, and Esquire.)

The first use of the Williams name began in 1965, when Gilberton's Swedish branch, Illustrerade Klassiker, was reorganized into Williams Förlags AB. (Bill Kanter was very involved with Gilberton World-Wide Productions, so one theory is that the name Williams Publishing was derived from William Kanter.)

In West Germany, Internationale Klassiker became Bildschriftverlag (BSV). BSV was acquired by National Comics Publications (i.e., DC Comics) in 1966. That same year, Thorpe & Porter, after going bankrupt, was also bought by National; this sale included all the Gilberton World-Wide Productions European branches.

In the summer of 1967, Kinney National Company acquired National Comics Publications and its sister publisher, E. C. Publications (publisher of Mad). Kinney acquired Warner Bros.-Seven Arts in the spring of 1969, rebranding it as Warner Bros. In 1971, Warner's international distribution operations merged with Columbia Pictures to form Columbia-Warner Distributors. At this point, in the summer of 1971, with Thorpe & Porter now part of Warner, the T & P U.K. brand was mostly replaced by Williams Publishing and Distributing Co. Ltd.. Following suit, the Williams name took over the former Gilberton branches in Denmark, Germany, the Netherlands, and Norway, with new Williams branches being founded in Finland, Italy, and shortly, in France. (On February 10, 1972, Kinney's entertainment assets were reincorporated as Warner Communications).

Roger Noel Cook became UK CEO of Williams Publishing in c. 1974, with his focus mostly on the men's magazine division.

=== Comics ===
The various Williams divisions produced very little original comics, mostly focusing on translations of Warner/DC Comics properties like Mad magazine, Superman, Tarzan and Korak comics, and western and war comics; as well as Larry Harmon's Laurel & Hardy, an original British comic. There was some variation of titles in each country, depending on the tastes of the various European audiences.

The flagship U.K. branch of Williams, however, had some creative energy in the period 1976–1978. Comics editor Dez Skinn, who came to the company from UK publisher IPC, took over editing MAD UK, Tarzan, Korak, and Larry Harmon Laurel & Hardy. He revived Monster Mag and launched the horror-themed magazine House of Hammer. Skinn's comics were mostly published under Williams’ Top Sellers imprint.

=== Magazines ===
The U.K. Williams also produced "saucy" books and posters, as well as a line of softcore pornography magazines with titles like Sex International News, True Love Stories, Cinema X, Cinema Blue, Parade, Game, Blade, Voi, and Sensuous. Many copies of those magazines were seized and forfeited in a series of British police raids in 1972 and again in 1975. In response, in 1976 Williams created the General Books Distribution (G.B.D. Ltd.) imprint for its "mature" comics and adults-only magazines.

=== Decline and sell-offs ===
The Williams line of publishers didn't turn a profit for Warner Communications, and before long the company decided to forego the periodical publishing business in Europe. In 1974 it began closing and selling off the various branches, completing the process by 1979. The flagship U.K. branch was acquired by W. H. Allen & Co. in 1977, going defunct by 1979.

Although many of the Williams divisions — in France, Italy, and Norway — went defunct, a few continued publishing under new owners. In West Germany, the Williams branch was acquired by editor Klaus Recht in 1974, with his family keeping the Williams name in various forms until 1991 (with the publisher itself lasting until 1995). In 1975, the Swedish branch was acquired by Semic Press, (Note: Former Williams employees in Sweden immediately formed Atlantic Förlags AB.) which was the dominant comics publisher in Sweden through the mid-1990s. The Danish branch was acquired by Interpresse in the summer of 1976; Interpresse was the dominant comics publisher in Denmark into the mid-1980s. The Dutch branch of Williams was acquired in 1979 by the publisher Kontekst, which continued a few titles, but which itself only lasted until c. 1984.

== Williams' European branches ==
Country	Williams name	Years of operation (as Williams)	Original name (year founded)	Popular comics	Fate
Denmark	Williams	1971–1976	I.K. (Illustrerede klassikere) (1956)	Classics Illustrated, Laurel & Hardy, Mad, romance, Starlet (Swedish girls' comic), Superman, Tarzan/Korak, Western	Acquired by Interpresse in the summer of 1976
Finland	Kustannus Oy Williams	1971–1976	—	Rin Tin Tin	Acquired by the Swedish Semic Group; became Kustannus Oy Semic
France	Williams France	1973–1974	—	Autocat and Motormouse, Benjie (European children's comic), Calimero, Classics Illustrated, Casper the Friendly Ghost, Dastardly and Muttley in Their Flying Machines, Laurel & Hardy, Pellefant	Went defunct
Italy	Edizioni Williams Inteuropa	1971–1974	—	Superman	Went defunct
Netherlands	Williams	c. 1971–c. 1979	Classics (1956)	Adventure comics, Batman, Classics Illustrated, fairy tales, HIP Comics (Spider-Man, X-Men, Fantastic Four), Laurel & Hardy, Mad, Superman, Tarzan/Korak, Tex Willer, war, Western	Acquired by Kontekst; lasted until c. 1984
Norway	Williams Forlag	c. 1971–1977	Illustrerte Klassikere (1957)	Classics Illustrated, Junior Adventures, Laurel & Hardy, Superman, Tarzan/Korak, war, Western	Went defunct
Sweden	Williams Förlags AB	1965–1975	Illustrerade Klassiker (1956)	Classics Illustrated, Starlet, Laurel & Hardy, Mad, My Horse, Pellefant, Superman, Tarzan/Korak, war	Acquired by Semic Press
United Kingdom	Williams Publishing and Distributing Co. Ltd.	1971–c. 1978	Thorpe & Porter (1946)	Benjy and His Friends, Fox and Crow, Golden Hours, Fun-In (featuring Motormouse and Autocat), House of Hammer, horror, romance, Tarzan/Korak, Toytown, war, Western, Yogi and His Toy / Hanna-Barbera's Fun Time	Acquired by W. H. Allen & Co. in 1977 and went defunct shortly thereafter
West Germany	Williams	1971–1974	Internationale Klassiker (1956)	The Avengers, Classics Illustrated, fairy tales, Fantastic Four, Hit Comics (Spider-Man, X-Men, Fantastic Four), horror, Laurel & Hardy, Mad, Spider-Man, Tarzan/Korak, Western	Acquired by Klaus Recht; (Note: Publisher names under Klaus Recht: Bildschriftenverlag / Williams Department (until Sept. 1973); Williams Verlag (Oct. 1973–Sept. 1974); Klaus Recht Verlag (Oct. 1974-June 1975); Williams Verlag (July 1975–June 1989); Delta Williams Recht Verlag (July 1989–Nov. 1991)) publisher lasted until 1995
