= Dörmögő Dömötör =

Fictional bear of novelist Zsigmond

Dörmögő Dömötör (lit. Brumming Demetrius) is a fictional bear, created by Hungarian novelist Zsigmond Sebők in 1902 and comparable to Winnie the Pooh. Dörmögő Dömötör is also a children's magazine established in 1957 by state-owned Ifjúsági Lapkiadó. The magazine's mascot is the aforementioned bear, but it presents many different kinds of stories, comics, puzzles, and others not related to the bear. The magazine is one of the best-selling magazines of publisher Drize Publishing Ltd.
