= Benny Mårtensson =

Swedish footballer and coach

Personal information
- Full name: Benny Michael Mårtensson
- Date of birth: November 6, 1957 (age 68)
- Place of birth: Osby, Sweden
- Position: Striker

Senior career*
Years	Team	Apps	(Gls)
1973-1990	Trelleborgs FF	497	(290)
1979-1980	→ IS Halmia (loan)		
1984-1985	→ Farense (loan)	6	(1)
1990-1992	Landskrona BoIS		
- IFK Malmö
- Stavsten/Ymor FK
- Gylle AIF
- ÖT Smygehuk FF
- Höllvikens GIF
- BK Skansen

Managerial career
- 1994-1996: ÖT Smygehuk FF
- 2004-2007: Trelleborgs FF (assistant manager)
- 2010-2012: ÖT Smygehuk FF
- * Club domestic league appearances and goals

Benny Michael Mårtensson (born 6 November 1957), nicknamed Benny Guldfot (lit. 'Benny Goldfoot'), is a Swedish football coach and former professional striker. He is best known for being Trelleborgs FF's all-time most-capped player at 497 appearances and top scorer with 290 goals, a record he achieved between 1973 and 1990, and is considered their all-time greatest player.
