= Bobo (Swedish comics) =

- Hungarian edition

Publication information
- Publisher: Semic Press (1973-1990)
- First appearance: 1978
- Created by: Lars Mortimer

In-story information
- Species: "Troll Bear" with green hat

Bobo is a Swedish comic strip, created by Lars Mortimer, published periodically between 1978 and 1990.

The main character is the eponymous "troll bear", encountering adventures in the forest, and occasionally the town nearby.

He is fond of sandwiches with cucumbers, and always carries around his "flaxkikare", (lit. akin to "flapping telescope"), a telescope which could transport the user to the area looked at.

"Bobo" had his own magazine from 1978 to 1989. A group of spin-off characters, "Gnuttarna", later had their own magazine.

== Names of the magazine ==
- Bobo (1978–1985)
- Bobo och skogsvännerna (1986–1988)
- Bobo och Gnuttarna (1988–1989)
- Gnuttarna (1990)
- Gnuttarna & c:o (1985–1988), published parallel with Bobo
- Christmas album (1979–1989)
