= Leyton Cross =

Semi-rural area in Kent, England

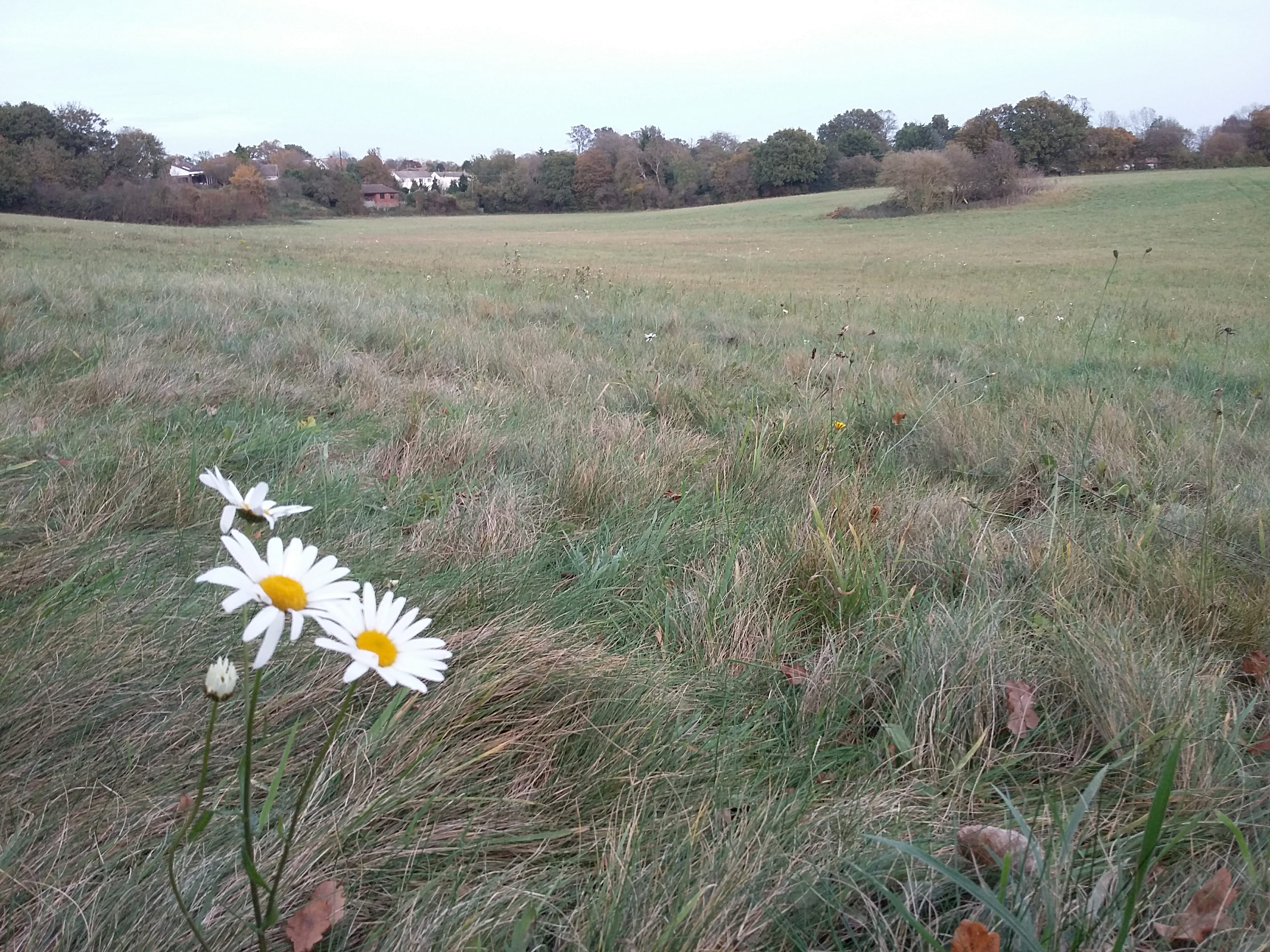
Grassy meadow by the footpath off Tredegar Road

Leyton Cross is a small semi-rural area in Kent, England, that largely falls within the parish of Wilmington in the borough of Dartford, although north of Oakfield Lane the area is administered directly by Dartford Borough Council. The boundaries of Leyton Cross are ill-defined but the residential area is generally said to include the neighbourhood around Leyton Cross Road, Clayton Croft Road, Tredegar Road, Manor Close and Wilmington Court Road, the western tip of Common Lane, plus the section of Oakfield Lane between Heath Lane (Upper) and Old Bexley Lane. Leyton Cross also includes areas of heathland to the immediate north and west of this district, which are parts of Dartford Heath. Leyton Cross may also sometimes be referred to as Heath Side.

Leyton Cross is named after a former crossing of five ways: routes east and west (Oakfield Lane), a route (Leyton Cross Road) leading south-west towards Birchwood, Swanley, and two footpaths heading north-east and north-west, which now exist only as remnants on Dartford Heath, their access from Wilmington having been lost upon construction of the A2 dual carriageway, which runs parallel with and to the north of Oakfield Lane. The north-east branch (towards Dartford) formed part of Heath Lane until the lane's route to Oakfield Lane was diverted over a new bridge to the east when the dual carriageway was built. The north-west fork continued on to Shepherd’s Lane, Bowman's Lodge and Crayford.

The origin of ‘Leyton’ is forgotten, however 'ley' means a land that is for a time laid to grass, clover, etc., and a grass meadow currently exists off Tredegar Road.

A 2018 review by the Local Government Boundary Commission for England resulted in Leyton Cross becoming part of the Maypole and Leyton Cross Ward of the borough.

== History ==
=== The Leyton Cross Bronzes ===
A small collection of Early Middle Bronze Age (c. 13th Century BC) tools and weapons, dubbed the Leyton Cross Hoard, was found in the garden of a house at Tredegar Road, Leyton Cross, 120 metres east of the present boundary with Dartford Heath. It was discovered by the owner of the property Mr John (Jack) Oliver whilst excavating the foundations of a home extension in 1986. The hoard comprises two axe-heads, a razor and a knife.

Dartford Museum, where the items are currently on display, says on the accompanying item description that they are the oldest man-made objects to be unearthed in the Dartford area, and describes the find as "one of the most exciting archaeological discoveries to be made in the area during the 20th Century". The shaving razor is thought to be the first of its kind to be found in Kent. Minute traces of a rough textile weave were found on the blade of the razor, suggesting the items had been wrapped in cloth before being hidden in the ground.

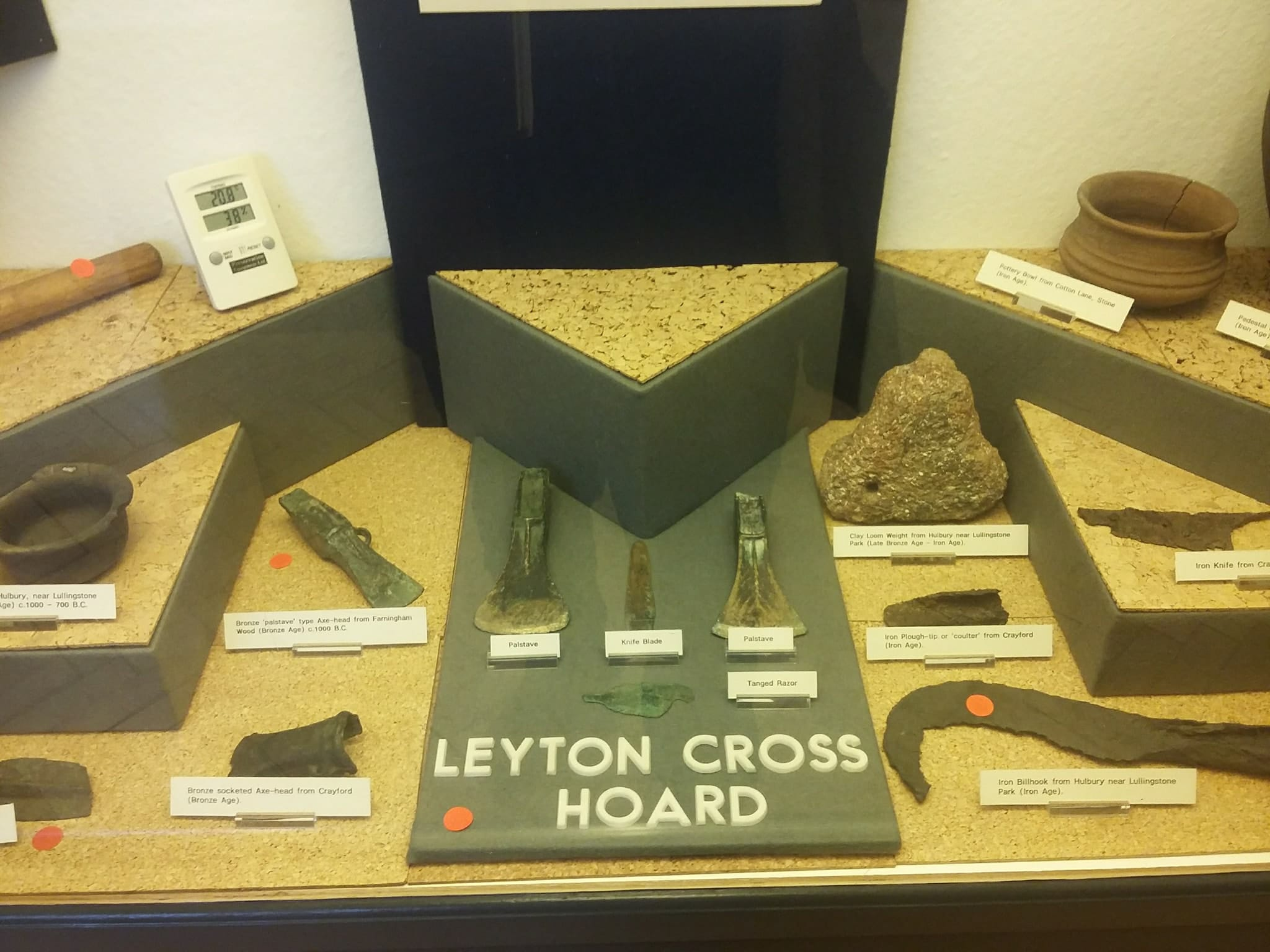
The Leyton Cross Hoard on display in Dartford Museum with other ancient artefacts.

Bronze was a precious metal at the time and experts have speculated that the hoard formed part of a bronzesmith's supply that was to be melted down for reuse. A larger hoard of bronze items was found nearby at Wansunt Pit on Dartford Heath in 1930.

=== Celtic and Roman eras ===
At the time of the Roman invasions (55 BC, 43 AD) a tribe of Celts known as the Cassi or Cassii lived in Cantiace (Kent) under chieftain Caswallen. The Cassi had a large settlement in an area of land in the area, including what is now Leyton Cross, Joyden's Wood, Rowhill and part of Dartford Heath.

Julius Caesar led the second invasion and may have made his advance as far as Tyrru (Rowhill); some historians believe that his troops clashed with the Cassii here and at Stankey (now Stanhill) and Caudens Wood (possibly referring to Joyden's Wood), all located a mile or so to the south-east and south-west of Leyton Cross.

The historian Edward Hasted notes in his History and Topographical Survey of the County of Kent (1778) that this Celtic “city” evidently became Roman. He observed a “great quantity of Roman bricks and other building materials” here and cites an S. Landale Esq., a “labourer in the archaeological vineyard” as saying that he (Hasted) would find “a mass of Roman brickwork in a cart lodge at Hook Green Farm” (some 800 metres south of Leyton Cross), “…It is therefore most probable a Roman mansion was erected there some years after the conquest of Kent; since the city of the Cassii was not at once destroyed after the victories of Aulus Plautius (A.D. 43) but by degrees fell into decay after the divergence of the road from the sea coast into the better formed and more direct Watling Street, aided by the establishment of the station of Noviomagus (Dartford), which by degrees attracted and absorbed the aborigines”.

=== 1000 – 1999 A.D. ===
The parts of Leyton Cross south of Oakfield Lane were, for centuries, linked to the manorial Baldwyns Park estate. The name Baldwyns probably derives from the area’s possession in “ancient times” by a Sir John Baude, “a man of an honourable family in this kingdom”.

Records from the time of King John (c. 1200) show that much of the land in the locality, including Baldwyns, were owned by the Abbots of Lesnes. When King Henry VIII dissolved the abbey in 1524, Baldwyns (then Baudiwins) was granted to Cardinal Wolsey who thenceforth benefited from the land's revenues, until he transferred custody to his Cardinal College, Oxford.

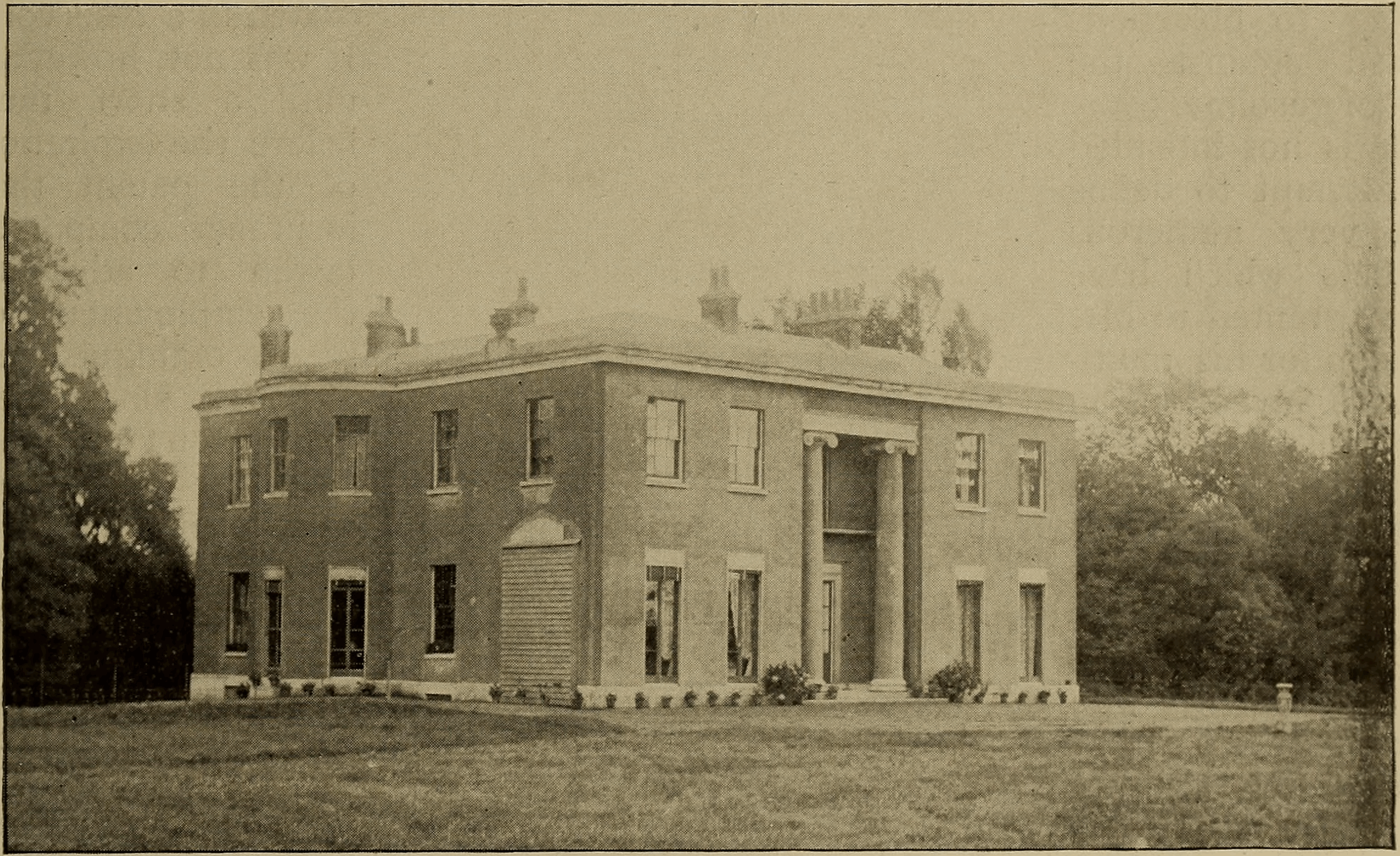
Baldwyns Park estate extended to Leyton Cross and beyond.

In 1779, France persuaded Spain to declare war on Great Britain and drew up plans for invasion. Britain readied its troops, and in 1780 an encampment of up to 8,000 soldiers were temporarily stationed on Dartford Heath. A contemporary plate published by T. Bish showed the camp covering an area of the heath between Dartford’s Maypole district (east of Coldblow, where Kent now borders the London Borough of Bexley), stretching north of Baldwyns Park and Leyton Cross, to Heath Lane (Upper). The site of the camp's long row of tents was still apparent when Dunkin described the events over sixty years later. A magazine was kept by the present location of Heath Lane (Upper). (The invasion did not take place, though France and Spain’s efforts helped the United States to consolidate their independence from Britain.)

Lands associated with Baldwyns Park then covered an area of Dartford and Wilmington in the south-east and south-west side of Oakfield Lane from Maypole, eastwards to about where the Wilmington Grammar School for Girls now resides, and south to Rowhill Wood and Rowhill Farm (the south side of which borders the village of Hextable in the present Sevenoaks District), Joyden’s Wood, and Ruxley (now in the London Borough of Bromley).

Over the centuries the college leased the estate to various owners, including Sir Edward Hulse. In 1739, Hulse became King's physician and was married to Elizabeth, daughter of Sir Richard Levett, a former Lord Mayor of London, before retiring to Baldwyns several years before his death in 1759. Records from this time also contain the first known reference to an actual manor house on the site. It appears that by his retirement Hulse owned Baldwyns outright, as his will shows his bequeathment of the land to his second son Richard, who also resided at the manor. Hulse was buried in the churchyard at Wilmington’s St Michael and All Angels.

Richard Hulse served as Sheriff of Kent in 1768. Five years after this he sold his interest in Baldwyns to Arnold Nesbitt esq. who took up residence in the manor house. In 1791 ownership of the property rights were transferred to Simon Frazer esq., a director of the East India Company. Frazer's daughter married Alexander Lord Selton who died at the manor in 1793. Hasted’s map of Kent of 1769 identifies the manor house of 'Baldings' as owned by Hulse. Today, Wilmington has two homes and a cul-de-sac named after Hulsewood, an area at the far east of Richard’s land, of which the girl’s grammar is also now part.

Isaac Minet, the ancestor of a Huguenot immigrant of the same name, became owner of Baldwyns Park around 1810, and it remained in his family for over six decades. Minet served as Sheriff of Kent in 1827, and died at Baldwyns 14 March 1839. The Wilmington Tithe map of 1842 shows the lands then in the possession of Thomas Minet. There is reference in Dartford Library to an incident in 1846 wherein a Mr Richard Salmon took issue with Susan Minet − possibly Isaac’s daughter Susan (1805–1882) − about her closing of a public right of way across land that led from Hook Green (700 metres south of Leyton Cross) to the manor house and Bexley village. Salmon calculated the extra distance to walk at 257 rods, the original being 158 rods. The path was reopened and is now Tile Kiln Lane (a private road that ends where Leyton Cross Road becomes Birchwood Road). The pathway can be seen on a 1799 map held in the British Museum.

Notwithstanding this apparent attempt to restrict a right of way, a member of the Minet family was later celebrated for his support of public open spaces: Susan’s brother Charles (1803–1874) was hailed by the local press as the 'Champion of the people of Dartford' for his efforts. Indeed, at the time of his death Charles Minet was involved in a civil action against the 1st Baron Tredegar, who owned some 350 acres of Dartford Heath on the north side of Leyton Cross, adjacent to Baldwyns. Minet had been outraged by the scarring and littering of the heath caused by Tredegar’s large-scale extractions of turf, sand and gravel, and challenged Tredegar's manorial rights to remove any amount of natural resources from it.

The Tredegars were an important family, who may also have had links to the nearby Wilmington Manor. During the Tredegars' ownership of the heath, and probably between the dates 1820 -1874, the heath was extensively exploited. Minet posthumously won his case, which is in large part responsible for the preservation of the remaining heath to this day, though large parts were later destroyed for road building: in 1926, for construction of the first Dartford by-pass (Princes Road), and 1970, for the cutting of Rochester Way (the present A2). Ironically, it was Tredegar who was commemorated when a new road at Leyton Cross was named after him in the 20th century.

After the death of Charles in 1874, the Minet family appears to have been left with financial difficulties; between 1874 and 1882 much of Baldwyns Park was sold off in lots. One sale advertisement read:

The beautiful Freehold Residential Estate, distinguished as Baldwyns, extending over about 841 acres in the parishes of Dartford, Wilmington and Bexley, a short distance only from the ancient and interesting market town of Dartford, about a mile away from Bexley and Crayford and only 14 by road from London, in a neighbourhood proverbially healthy and picturesque, and with excellent railway facilities by the North Kent Line, by which the City and West End are reached in little more than half an hour. It comprises a capital Mansion, with suitable attached and detached offices of every description, desirable for the occupation of a family of distinction, approached by a carriage drive, with ornamental entrance lodges, beautiful pleasure grounds, gardens, and orchards, surrounded by a richly timbered park, ornamental woods, plantations, and adjacent meadow land, through which are delightful walks of considerable extent. And immediately adjoining is the farm known as Stonehill, farm buildings, and numerous enclosures of productive land, also several cottages for labourers. The woodland, which includes the well known Ruxley-Heath, Rowhill and Joydens Woods, is well adapted for the rearing of preservation game, and affords excellent shooting, and several packs of hounds hunt the district. The property presents unusual attractions as the site of the ancient city of Caswallon, and from the interesting remains of encampments and excavations made by our Celtic ancestors found thereon; while in addition to its present residential advantages, it possesses extensive frontages of Dartford Heath and the high road, immediately available for building purposes, and by a judicious widening of the intersecting road leading from Bexley to Wilmington.

Clayton Croft and the Maypole area were sold by auction in 1882. The manor house was adapted for hospital use (the Bexley Lunatic Asylum) after 1898 and is now the main office of Oxleas NHS Foundation Trust.

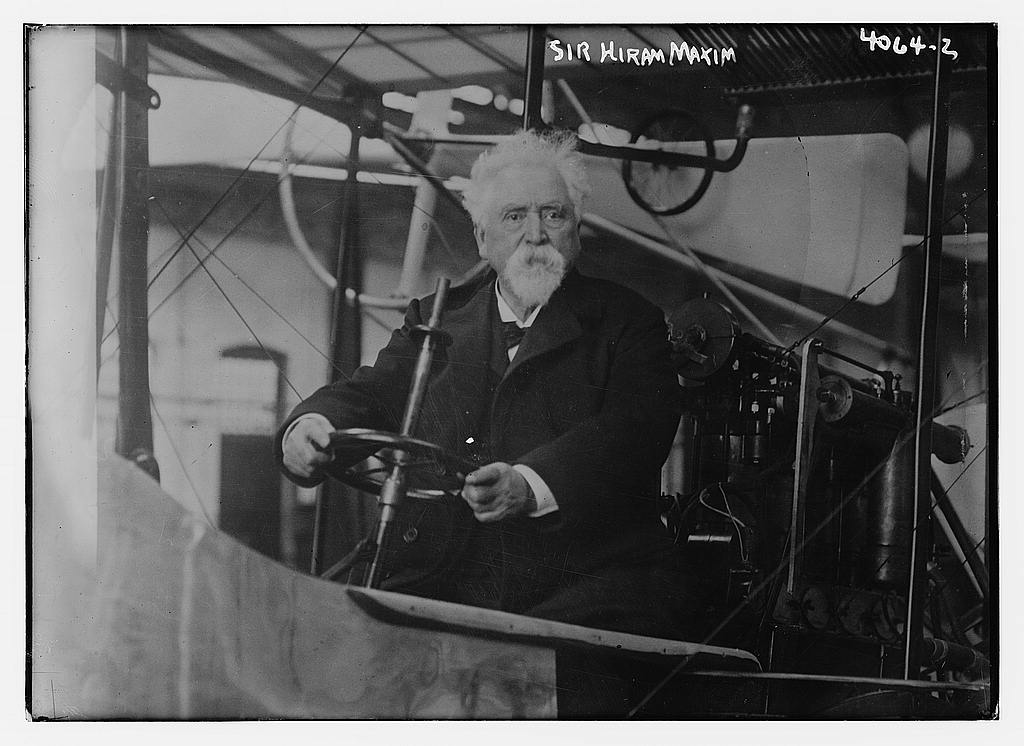
Sir Hiram Maxim

The American-born inventor Hiram Maxim experimented with flying machines at Baldwyns Park. In 1891 he built a large hangar in the grounds where a prototype flying machine was developed. A planning application to London County Council in 1894 shows its site and the path of the rail tracks that it would run on for take-off. The rails ran out of the hangar south eastwards towards the junction of Tile Kiln Lane and Birchwood Road. The rails measured 1,800 feet in length and up 35 feet wide. The wings were added outside of the hangar, giving the craft a wingspan of 104 feet. He called these wings 'aeroplanes'. The first propelled flight of man in a machine heavier than air was witnessed at Baldwyns in 1894, though it was not classified as 'free flight' and the rails were damaged in the attempt. Work on this craft was subsequently abandoned.

The Law of Property Act 1925 brought an end to lords of manor in the area. Under section 193 of the Law Act, the Lord of the Manor or other person entitled to land subject to ‘rights of common’ could declare that this section of the act should apply to the land. This effectively would give the public right of access to “air and exercise” on the land. His rights to use the heath as he desired having been severely restricted, Lord Tredegar chose to sell the land to Dartford Urban District Council for the sum of £1,000.

In 1924, geologists noted that ten years earlier in a pit on the north side of one path leading to Leyton Cross “near the eastern margin of the Dartford Heath Gravel…Some 20 feet of chalk were visible; from 1 to 4 feet of Coombe Rock are present at the top and there are many flints.” They also noted that “in Heath Street on the way to Leyton Cross, 6 feet of gravel was seen in an old pit…brickearth was formerly worked here but cannot now be traced”. An established manufacturer of breeze blocks was based in Leyton Cross Road until at least the 1950s.

During World War II an army camp was located on the heath; its main gate at Leyton Cross. A Royal Artillery anti-aircraft regiment was based there, and their dispatch riders would train by riding their motorbikes over the network of sand banks known locally as the Glory Bumps. Anti aircraft guns were installed on Dartford Heath north of Leyton Cross; a notice board was erected showing the number of enemy aircraft they had shot down. After the war the army huts were used to house displaced families. Some of the camp's tarmac road surfaces are still visible on the heath.

In 1955, Mr. Norman Dodds, MP for Dartford, asked the Secretary of State for War when Dartford Heath would be cleared of the remaining evidence of the anti-aircraft strong point, and when Dartford Heath would be restored to its natural state. In the same year, the Standing Committee on the Rehabilitation and Resettlement of Disabled Persons published an account of the services provided for the disabled by government departments, local authorities and voluntary organisations, and noted that the Home Workers Products Society was based at the Gun Site, Leyton Cross.

In 1977, TV director Jeremy Summers made a Children's Film Foundation production of Fear at Leyton Cross, though it is not known if this featured the Dartford location.

== Amenities ==
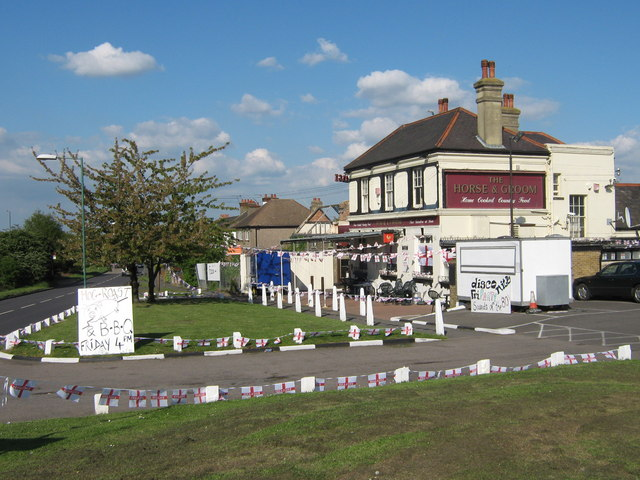
The Horse and Groom before renovations in 2015.

The Horse and Groom is a public house and local landmark on Leyton Cross Road. Occupying a recently extended early 20th Century building, its frontage overlooks Dartford Heath. In 2015 new owners restored the business, turning what had been a flagging traditional pub into a busy gastropub offering up to five local ales.

Leyton Cross Social Club is an independent, non-profit making organisation with club facilities in Tredegar Road. As well as hosting their own events the club room is let to local groups including fitness clubs, a short mat bowls club, a play group, and dog training school, and the building acts as the local polling station. A Christmas fair is held annually.

Hayden Football Club on Leyton Cross Road was founded in 1973. Hayden Youth Association is a voluntary run organisation providing football coaching for children aged 5 years and above. They have roughly 24 youth teams and a senior men’s team, and are designated a FA Charter Standard Community club, the highest FA recognition offered in youth football.

Kent Chilli Farm at Heathside Nursery on Cherry Tree Lane is a specialist food producer growing and manufacturing foods from over 30 varieties of chilli peppers native to America, Europe and Australia. Deneland Boarding Kennels and Cattery is an eight-decade old business occupying part of the historic Hook Green Farm site.
