= Dartford Brent =

Common land and cricket ground in Kent, England

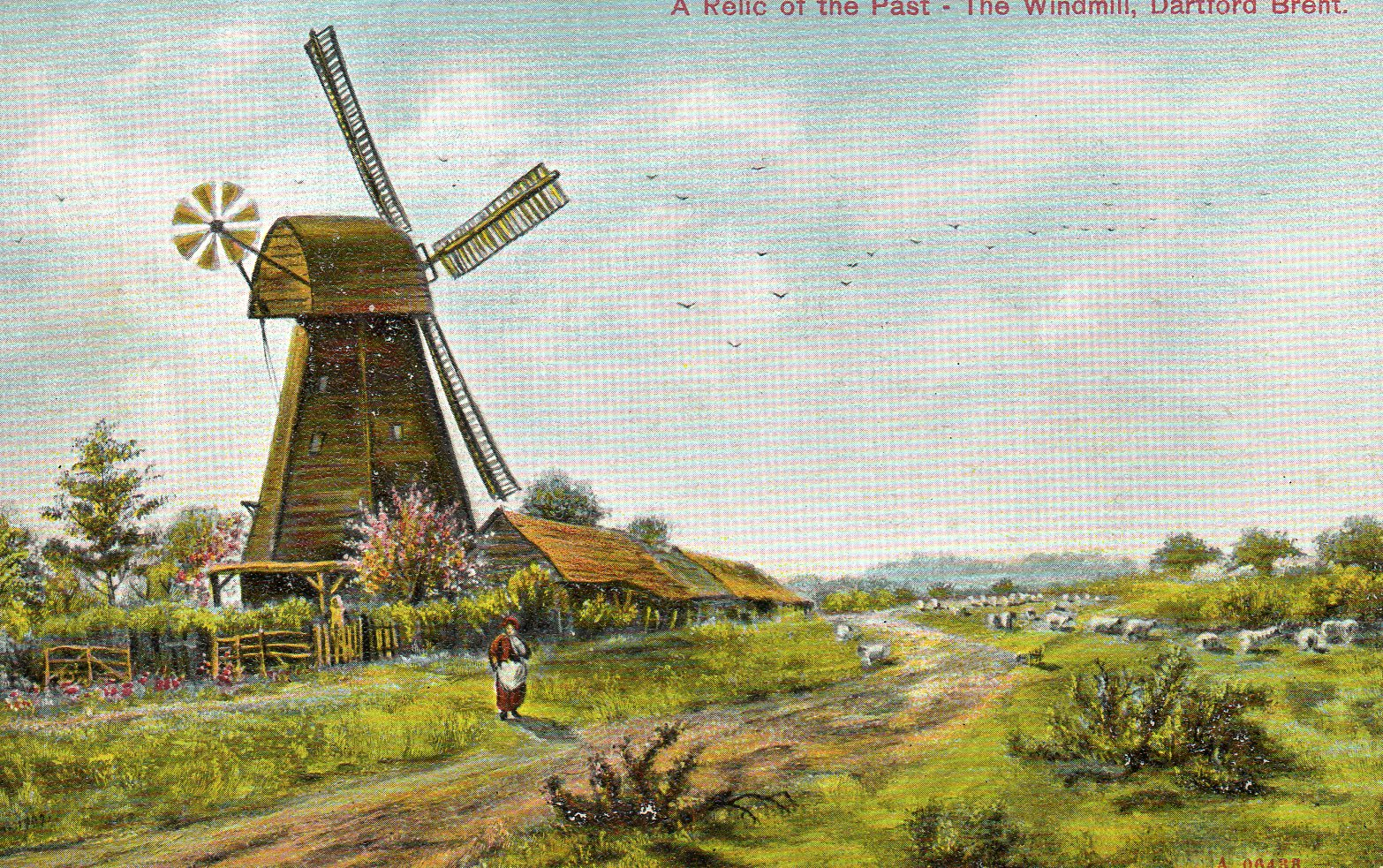
- Brent Mill, Dartford. Painting reproduced as a postcard. Mill demolished 1901
- Interactive map of Dartford Brent
- Location: Dartford, Kent
- Country: England
- Coordinates: 51.438°N 0.233°E
- Home club: Dartford Cricket Club
- Establishment: before 1709
- Last used: 1930

Dartford Brent was an extensive area of common land on the outskirts of Dartford in Kent. Historically, it was the scene of a confrontation between King Henry VI and Richard Plantagenet, 3rd Duke of York in 1452 and in 1555 thousands of spectators were to witness the burning to death at the stake of Christopher Ward, a Dartford linen weaver, executed for his Protestant faith.

Part of Dartford Brent was a cricket venue in the 18th century and it was almost certainly used for cricket during the 17th century. It was noted for the quality of its turf, which was said to be "as smooth as a bowling green". Dartford Cricket Club still plays in the Kent Cricket League and its present ground at Hesketh Park is on part of the Brent.

The Brent is now primarily known as the name of a main road in east Dartford linking Dartford town centre and Stone, forming part of the A226. 'Brent' is a word in Kentish dialect meaning 'steep' and its use here possibly refers to the area of the Brent being located atop Dartford's East Hill.

== Cricket venue ==
Cricket was played at Dartford Brent throughout the 18th century and numerous references have survived from 1709 to 1795. The earliest known inter-county match took place there on 29 June 1709 when teams (probably parishes) called Kent and Surrey played against each other, and there are records of several similar matches held on the Brent between then and 1724.

Games in Dartford after 1795 were played at Bowman's Lodge on nearby Dartford Heath until Hesketh Park opened in 1904, although the Brent was used for occasional matches.

== Campaign against closure ==
An unsuccessful campaign was waged against the Brent's enclosure during the 1870s and the townspeople presented a petition to the Court of Common Council. Among other things, the petition held that a portion of the Brent had been used as the town cricket ground throughout the whole period of living memory; while the whole area had been "constantly resorted to for all sorts of past times and has been looked upon as the recreation ground of Dartford". The cricket ground at that time lay near the top of Brent Lane, somewhere across the road which passes alongside Hesketh Park.

== Today ==
Dartford Cricket Club still plays in the Kent League and its present ground at Hesketh Park is almost all that is left of the old Brent.
