= Jack Edward Oliver =

British cartoonist

- Marrying his longtime girlfriend Liz Hales in March 2007
- Born: 19 June 1942 Dartford, Kent, England
- Died: 26 May 2007 (aged 64)
- Areas: Cartoonist, Writer, Artist
- Pseudonym: JEO
- Notable works: Master Mind; Cliff Hanger; Vid Kid; The Champ; Record Mirror
- Spouse: Liz Hales (m. 2007)

Jack Edward Oliver (19 June 1942 – 26 May 2007) was a British cartoonist. He is more usually known as J. Edward Oliver (or JEO, or Jack).

== Biography ==
Oliver achieved fame in the 1970s with a long-running strip in the UK music paper Disc (and Music Echo), later Record Mirror. The strip had many fans including John Lennon. It included characters from TV, film and music, with a large section for readers' contributions (Win a Plastic Warthog). He provided other material, including a pop-based strip called The Nose, stories and numerous graphics.

One character proved particularly enduring, a dinosaur called Fresco-Le-Raye. Until his death, Oliver continued to create Fresco strips, which can be seen on his official website. The site also features other strips, such as The Invisible Man, a staple of his Record Mirror years. Other work at that time included promotional art for a single by Terry Dactyl and the Dinosaurs and UK records.

In November 1977, the Record Mirror strip was deemed not contemporary enough and was ended. Oliver went to work for IPC Magazines Ltd, creating comic strips including Buster's Master Mind (1980-1983), Cliff Hanger (1983-1987) and Vid Kid, as well as drawing The Champ in Whizzer and Chips from 1979 to 1981. Many of his strips included puzzles and games. In 1984, Oliver also wrote the words for a musical called Swan Esther which was performed at London's Young Vic and on BBC radio.

When Buster ceased publication at the beginning of 2000, Oliver was the last artist left, and drew the only non-reprint material in the comic's final issue ("How It All Ends", which looked back at how all the Buster characters ended). With Buster gone, Oliver investigated other work, including newspaper strips and first day covers. In 2000, together with his cousin Steve, he created Phil Stamp Covers, unique first day covers for stamp collectors.

Among Oliver's trademarks in his strips were little signs reading "Abolish Tuesdays" and regular sightings of a tiny cube with a crank handle attached. The latter was never explained. Oliver also had something of an obsession with the British actress Madeline Smith, drawing several appearances by her into his work, which she later complained about. Oliver reacted characteristically, producing a strip about her complaint.

In 2000 a website appeared celebrating Oliver's early work in Disc and Record Mirror but later he contributed new material, as well as obscure historical stuff and a new, e-mailed (and free) weekly strip of Fresco-Le-Raye, which eventually had hundreds of subscribers and ran for several hundred episodes.

In 2007 Oliver announced he was suffering from cancer, but he continued to create new material. In March 2007 he married his girlfriend of many years, Liz Hales. He died peacefully on 26 May 2007.

=== Archaeological find ===
A rare collection of early Middle Bronze Age (c. 13th century B.C.) tools and weapons was discovered by Oliver's father John whilst digging the footings of an extension to his home in Dartford, in 1986. The four implements comprised two axe-heads, a knife and a tanged shaving razor and are known as the Leyton Cross Bronzes. The items were purchased by and are on display in Dartford Museum.
