= Dartford Urban District =

Local authority in Kent, England

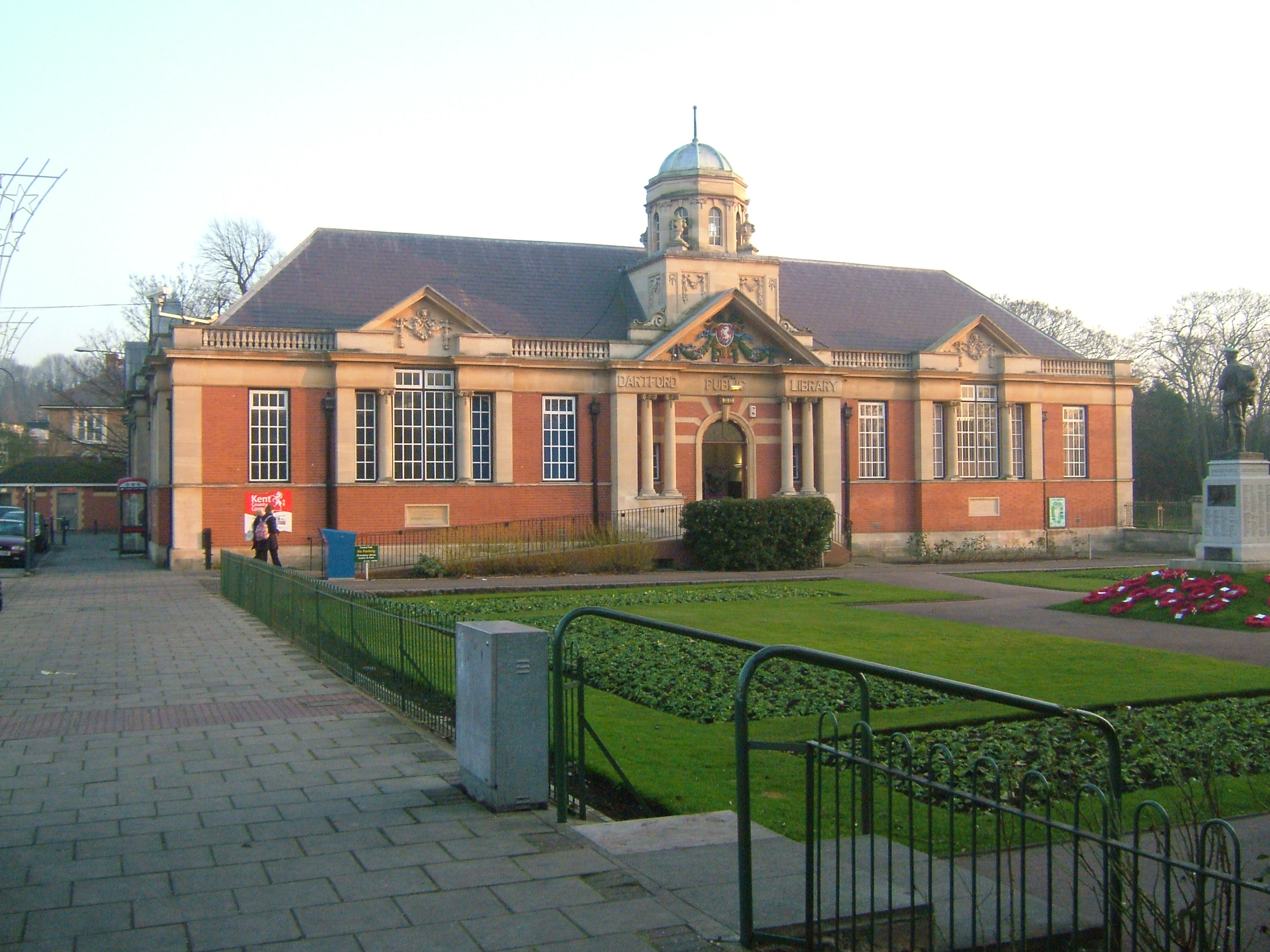
Dartford's Library and Museum were commissioned by the Dartford Urban District Council.

Dartford Urban District was a local authority in Kent, England. It was appointed in 1894 to provide local government to Dartford town and its immediate environs including, from 1925, Dartford Heath. It replaced the Dartford Local Board, and had fifteen councillor seats.

Local businessman Everard Hesketh, owner of J & E Hall, had been elected to the Local Board in 1884 and continued to serve on Dartford Urban District Council (DUDC) until 1913. He donated land to the district, which became Hesketh Park in 1904. Another prominent member was James Sharp, owner of James Sharp and Son, builders and timber merchants, in Hythe Street, Dartford, and the nearby Baltic Saw Mills

DUDC were instrumental in the establishment of Dartford’s Central Park, Museum and Library. They built a power station in Priory Road for the town in 1901, and on 14 February 1906 opened the Dartford Council Light Railways tram system, which operated until November 1935 when trams were replaced by a fleet of trolleybuses. The council maintained the local sewage works and marketed dried sludge from it as agricultural fertiliser.

The authority was perhaps the first United Kingdom council to lend its support to the establishment of specialist state-run clinics for the treatment of babies and children under five to combat the then high infant mortality rate in Britain.

The council worked with the Dartford Traders' Association to have the town awarded a Charter of Incorporation; this was finally achieved in 1933, after which the Municipal Borough of Dartford came into being. The Urban District Council held its last meeting on 4 October 1933.

Dartford Rural District did not join the borough until 1974.
