= Master Mind (comics) =

British comic strip

"Master Mind" was a comic strip in the British comic magazine Buster. It made its first appearance in the issue dated 8 November 1980, and ran until 1983 when it was replaced with Cliff Hanger. It was written and drawn by Jack Edward Oliver.

Alf Witt was a boy who lived in the town of Flittem, and was not very clever. After falling into a hole, he met a wizard called Madness Madnesson (a reference to Magnus Magnusson, who hosted the television show Mastermind at this time) who gave him super powers. By getting into a telephone booth and saying the mystic word "Pass", Alf Witt would transform into a superhero called Master Mind.

In the strip he would come across a supervillain and ask the readers for help on how to defeat him, this would usually involve puzzles such as anagrams, join the dots, and many others. Master Mind also had a dog that would accompany him, called Bones.
