= Cliff Hanger (comic strip) =

1983 comic strips

Cliff Hanger is the name of two different 1983 comic strips, one published in the United Kingdom and the other in the United States.

== British version ==
The British Cliff Hanger was written and drawn by Jack Edward Oliver. It first appeared in the 25 June 1983 issue of the British comics magazine Buster.

Watching a television show called 'Now Get Out of This' (a parody of Now Get Out of That), Cliff remarks that he thinks he could get out of everything. This is overheard by the Evil Spies, agents of M.E.S.S. (the Mysterious Evil Spies Society). They tell Cliff that he's now a guinea pig in their traps, and if he doesn't survive, they'll know the traps will be good enough to use against secret agents.

From then on, the premise of the strip every week would be that Cliff is suddenly transported into a dangerous situation by the spies, using the Atomic Matter Transmitter. Three options would be presented to the readers, who would select one by ticking one of the boxes, and turning to another page to see whether their choice was correct or not. For example, in the first strip, Cliff is stranded on a moving artificial desert island. Just as it's about to hit the shore, the current changes and Cliff is driven back into the shark infested sea. The choices were 'Take off his shoe and use it to paddle the island to the shore', 'Pull out the tree and use it as a raft' and 'Climb the tree'. A and B were incorrect- using the shoe as a paddle simply sent Cliff round in circles, and pulling out the tree revealed it was plugging a hole, causing the island to sink. The correct answer was C, as Cliff's weight caused the tree to bend over onto the shore, lifting Cliff to safety.

The strip featured several minor background details that would occur in every issue, including a box with a handle, a plaster, the word 'Acme', an arrow with another (backwards facing) arrow inside it, a warthog, the initials 'JEO', a worm, and a sign saying "Abolish Tuesdays". A running gag would feature one of the Evil Spies' constant wondering why his counterpart would frequently call him "Ray" even though that wasn't his name, when in fact he was simply referring to one of the gadgets ("Fire the Transporter Ray!"). Another thing of note is that Cliff's jumper often featured the strip number on it, starting with a "1" in the first, and going on well into the hundreds at the end. Over the years, several continuous storylines emerged featuring parodies of popular film and television series of the day, including James Bond, the Star Wars Trilogy, Back to the Future and Transformers. The strip ended in 1987, replaced by Vid Kid.

However, as Buster moved into the 1990s, the amount of reprints started to dramatically increase, and several old strips began to reappear. Cliff Hanger was one of these, though as J. Edward Oliver was still working for the comic, he was able to turn the originally black and white pages into full colour. With most of the readers unaware that these were reprints, this gave the impression that they were brand new. In February 1998, when the strips started being reprinted for a third time, rather than continue to advertise them as new, the Cliff Hanger Classic strand was started. Here there would be an afterword at the bottom of the strips, written by Jack, featuring factual information like the original issue dates, background details explained, the most popular television programmes of that week, or the top 5 of that week's UK Singles Chart.

By 1999, virtually the entire comic featured reprints. Because of this, J. Edward Oliver decided to draw one final strip, which appeared in issue 118/99, dated 7–21 July 1999 (the comic had become a fortnightly publication in 1995). Finding the Evil Spies in danger, all three options led to the conclusion that the Evil Spies would never trap Cliff again (if Cliff called the police, the spies would be arrested, if Cliff helped them out, they would stop trapping Cliff as a gesture of thanks, etc.). This issue also featured the final appearance of 'b-mail', the name used at the time for the Letters Page (which Jack also wrote). Cliff's final appearance was in a cameo appearance in the last page of Buster's final issue, which occurred half a year later. Explaining how all the characters ended, and once again drawn by J. Edward Oliver, Cliff was seen mourning the passing of Bernie Banks (the lead character in Memory Banks, another Buster strip) who had apparently forgotten how to breathe. Symbolising that this was indeed the final issue, his jumper carried the word 'END'.

== American version ==
The American Cliff Hanger was written by Bruce Jones with artwork by Al Williamson. The title character was a swashbuckling adventurer who crash lands in a jungle in the late 1930s and finds a secret research facility. The strip originally appeared as a back-up feature in the four issue run of Somerset Holmes, a 1983 thriller comic book by Jones and artist Brent Anderson. It was reprinted in the 2003 collection Al Williamson Adventures.
