= Hesketh Park (cricket ground) =

Cricket ground in Dartford, Kent, England

- Interactive map of Hesketh Park

Ground information
- Location: Dartford, Kent
- Country: England
- Coordinates: 51.439°N 0.235°E
- Home club: Dartford Cricket Club
- Establishment: 1905
- Owner: Dartford Borough Council

International information
- Only women's ODI: 7 July 1973: Australia v New Zealand

Team information
| Dartford Cricket Club | (1905–present) |
| Kent County Cricket Club | (1956–1990) |
- As of 6 September 2020; Source: CricketArchive

Hesketh Park is a cricket ground in Dartford in Kent. The ground is the home of Dartford Cricket Club, one of the oldest cricket clubs in the United Kingdom. The ground was established at the beginning of the 20th century and has been used as a first-class cricket venue by Kent County Cricket Club.

The ground is located around 1 mile (1.6 km) south-east of Dartford town centre and is one of the few open spaces which remain on what was once the Dartford Brent. The A296 road runs along the western team of the ground with the A225 road to the south and the A282 Dartford Crossing approach road running 250 metres (0.16 mi) east of the ground.

== Establishment ==
Cricket has been played at Dartford since at least the early 18th century and Dartford Cricket Club is one of the oldest established cricket clubs in England. Cricket was first played on Dartford Brent, an area of common land to the east of the town on which the modern Hesketh Park ground is situated. The earliest known match between two county teams took place on the Brent in 1709 with a Kent team playing one from Surrey. After the end of the 18th century, matches moved to Bowman's Lodge on Dartford Heath before Hesketh Park was established at the start of the 20th century.

An area of municipal park land was established at Hesketh Park in 1904 as a result of a donation by local businessman Everand Hesketh. The site was expanded in 1905 when Hesketh purchased land adjacent to the park to build a sports ground which includes the cricket ground. The first match on the ground was held in 1905, with Hesketh bowling the first over. The ground is owned by Dartford Borough Council and operated by the council and Dartford Cricket Club.

== Cricket history ==
Kent County Cricket Club used Hesketh Park for First XI fixtures between 1956 and 1990. The first first-class cricket match on the ground took place in May 1956 and saw Kent play Essex. A total of 33 first-class matches were held on the ground, with Kent playing a County Championship fixture at Dartford in most seasons from 1956 until 1990. In 1963 the county played twice at the ground, a Championship match against Northants followed by a match against the Pakistan Eaglets – a touring team of younger Pakistani cricketers. The final first-class match on the ground was held in August 1990 with Leicestershire as the opposition.

Kent have also played two List-A cricket matches on the ground, both against Essex. The first match took place in the 1978 Benson & Hedges Cup and the second in the 1981 tournament. The Kent Second XI also used the ground 40 times between 1947, when they played Norfolk in the Minor Counties Championship, and 1995 when it was used in the Second XI Championship.

During the 1973 Women's Cricket World Cup the ground was used for a single Women's One Day International. Australia women beat New Zealand women on the ground with Australian opening batsman Bev Wilson scoring a half-century.

In local domestic cricket the ground has been the home venue of Dartford Cricket Club since it was established in 1905. The club plays in the Kent Cricket League. The pavilion on the ground was replaced in 2015, the new building replacing one which had been built in the 1980s to replace the original pavilion which had been built when the ground was established but was later destroyed by fire. The pavilion project was part funded by Dartford Borough Council with a grant of £1 million. A new area of cricket nets was built on the ground as part of the project. The ground has also hosted fixtures involving Lashings World XI.

== Records on the ground ==
A total of 33 first-class and two List A matches were held on the ground, all with Kent as the home team.

- Highest total: 476 by Kent against Essex, 1985
- Lowest total: 65 by Nottinghamshire against Kent, 1988
- Highest partnership: 231, 3rd wicket by H Pilling and CH Lloyd, for Lancashire against Kent, 1970
- Highest individual score: 204 not out, JA Ormrod, for Worcestershire against Kent, 1973
- Best bowling in an innings: 8/39, F Ridgway, for Kent against Nottinghamshire, 1960
- Best bowling in a match: 12/101, F Ridgway, for Kent against Nottinghamshire, 1960

In the two List A matches on the ground the highest team score was 226/4 scored by Kent chasing an Essex score of 222 in 1978. The highest individual score was 79 not out, scored by Bob Woolmer for Kent in 1981 in another successful run chase against Essex. The highest women's individual score on the ground was 50 runs scored by Bev Wilson.

== Other sports ==
Hesketh Park is the home of Dartford bowls club. Grass and hard tennis courts are also available in the wider park.
