= Bernard Falk =

British journalist

Bernard Michael Falk (16 February 1943 – 4 August 1990) was a British television reporter and interviewer perhaps best known for his contributions to the BBC current affairs and magazine programme Nationwide in the 1970s and the BBC Radio 4 travel programme Breakaway in the 1980s.

Born in Southport, he began his career in print journalism with the Birkenhead News and played Liverpool's Cavern Club in the evenings as a member of a beat group called 'Tony Snow and his Blizzards', later renamed 'The Bohemians'. He then worked on Fleet Street for the Daily Mirror, before his first job as a television reporter on Scottish Television's regional news programme Scotland Today, covering local issues across Central Scotland. He quickly graduated to Scotland Today Report, a weekly current affairs programme – filmed mostly within STV's region – on the issues of the day.

He enjoyed a short spell at BBC Scotland, appearing on Reporting Scotland and then, an often controversial series of late-night entertainment shows called Falk On.... with the last word of the title featured the subject to be discussed. He later moved to London to join BBC current affairs, appearing in programmes including 24 Hours. In 1971, Falk interviewed a silhouetted member of the Provisional IRA for 24 Hours and was incarcerated at Crumlin Road Gaol in Belfast for four days after refusing to identify his source. His more light-hearted programmes included a 1973 segment for Nationwide, in which he investigated Hornsea residents' opposition to a proposed nudist beach, while wearing nothing but strategically placed foliage.

From 1981 he hosted the early reality television survival show Now Get Out of That. In 1982, Falk hosted the late-night studio programme Sin on Saturday. Although the format had called for eight episodes with guests debating the seven deadly sins, the show was axed after just three episodes on lust, greed, and envy.

He reported on British general election night programmes. He also worked on Start The Week on BBC Radio 4 and was the regular presenter of BBC Radio 4's Saturday morning travel programme, Breakaway. In 1986, while presenting Breakaway, he referred to himself as a 'little fat Yid', attracting a deluge of complaints.

He introduced Going Places on Radio Four on Fri 3rd August 1990 at 1830 hrs as usual and died on the Saturday, aged 47, having only recently been moved from Breakaway.
