= Sin on Saturday =

- Country of origin: United Kingdom
- No. of episodes: 3

Production
- Running time: 35 minutes

Original release
- Network: BBC1
- Release: 7 August – 21 August 1982

Sin on Saturday is a British live, late-night chat show based on the theme of the seven deadly sins. It was produced by BBC Scotland. Originally, the show was to broadcast eight episodes, it was pulled from the schedules after only three broadcasts. The first seven were to be based on each of the deadly sins, and the eighth one intended to round off the series by debating the meaning of transgression.

The show was hosted by Bernard Falk and also featured comedy sketches and musical interludes. It included a memorable appearance by the actor Oliver Reed who interrupted an interview with a nun on the edition entitled 'Lust', which also featured porn actress Linda Lovelace.

In 1992 the show was featured on a 'TV Hell' theme night broadcast on BBC2.

== Cast ==
- Bernard Falk – Host
- Robbie Coltrane
- Elaine Loudon
- Rod Natkiel – Director

== Episode list ==
1. Episode 1. Lust – Aired 7 August 1982
2. Episode 2. Covetousness – Aired 14 August 1982
3. Episode 3. Envy – Aired 21 August 1982

At the end of the third episode, it was announced that the fourth episode was to be on gluttony. However it never aired.
