= Breakaway (radio programme) =

Breakaway was BBC Radio's second regular consumer travel programme, the first being the short-lived "Away From It All", both run by producer Roger MacDonald. It was launched on 29 September 1979, when it ran from 9.05 to 9.50 on BBC Radio 4 and continued to be broadcast live every Saturday morning in roughly the same time slot for almost two decades. Its longest-serving presenter was Bernard Falk, who fronted the programme from 1980 to 1990. Breakaway finally came to an end as part of the extensive schedule changes introduced by Radio 4 controller James Boyle in April 1998.

== History and format ==
Breakaway took the BBC into a new era, far removed from the idealised travel dreams of the Holiday programme, presenting a relatively impartial and realistic view of travel. MacDonald favoured reporters who were members of the Guild of Travel Writers who were hardened travel professionals, and schooled them in the art of radio journalism. A regular commentator was Nigel Coombs, then editor of Travel Trade Gazette who provided knowledgeable insights into the travel industry. The mix of 'warts and all' location features and comedic interviews with travel executives trying to defend the indefensible, found almost universal favour with the audience. Editor of the Skier & Snowboarder magazine, Frank 'Scoop' Baldwin, and his deputy Rob Freeman, also agreed to be interviewed while naked in a sauna in Zell am See to give an insight about the etiquette Brits would have to adhere to when visiting Austrian spa facilities.

The programme often discussed unsavoury topics; for example, it ran an interview with Dr. Jane Wilson-Howarth on diarrhoea while travelling. The programme was occasionally broadcast from overseas, including New York, Hong Kong, Singapore and the Great Barrier Reef, Australia, and famously on one occasion live from Bruges on the weekend when the Townsend Thoresen ferry "Herald of Free Enterprise" ran aground.

== Theme music ==
The distinctive theme music was "Breakaway" written by Con Conrad, Archie Gottler and Sidney D. Mitchell for the film Fox Movietone Follies of 1929 and performed by Jack Hylton and his Orchestra.
