= Now Get Out of That =

BBC television series, 1981 to 1984

- Genre: Game show
- Presented by: Bernard Falk
- Country of origin: United Kingdom
- Original language: English
- No. of series: 4
- No. of episodes: 19 (list of episodes)

Production
- Executive producer: Derek Smith
- Producer: Philip Franklin
- Running time: 30 minutes
- Production company: BBC Television

Original release
- Network: BBC One
- Release: 24 August 1981 – 24 July 1984

Now Get Out of That is a BBC television series, in which two teams compete against each other in endurance tests.

== Programme ==
The show was presented by Bernard Falk. Nineteen episodes were produced over the life of the show which ran for four series from 1981 to 1984 and was broadcast on BBC One.

== Format ==
The series obtained its name from the initial challenge of the teams having to get out of a certain situation, and to cope with the unknown for 24 hours in the open, in a contest of resourcefulness and resilience.

== Title sequence ==
The title sequence didn't have any theme music, just the stylised programme title overlaid with various sound effects.

For series 1, the titles were live action, shot from the point of view of a contestant crashing breathlessly through the forest undergrowth, with the noise of distant dogs in pursuit. The barbed wire framed logo was superimposed over the sequence.

For series 4, the leitmotif throughout the sequence was a lit fuse burning down to the inevitable explosion. The words of the programme title conveyed, in a series of live action model shots, the nationalities of the contestants and the kind of tasks they would have to undertake in their quest.

== Series overview ==
Series overview
| Series | Episodes | Originally released | |
| Series | Episodes | First released | Last released |
|---|---|---|---|
| 1 | 4 | 24 August 1981 | 27 August 1981 |
| 2 | 5 | 7 July 1982 | 4 August 1982 |
| 3 | 5 | 5 April 1983 | 3 May 1983 |
| 4 | 5 | 26 June 1984 | 24 July 1984 |

== Episode list ==
=== Series 1 (1981) ===
Teams from Oxford University and Cambridge University compete against each other. In and around Eastnor Castle, Herefordshire. Their target is to retrieve an electronic device, codenamed 'The Beast', from a castle.

| No. overall | No. in series | Original release date |
|---|---|---|
| 1 | 1 | 24 August 1981 |
The problem is to pull a Land Rover out of a bog when the winching tackle is inside a milk churn stuck in a mined area and the ignition key is in a glass tube attached to a tree.
| 2 | 2 | 25 August 1981 |
The teams have been captured and now must escape from a PoW camp surrounded by piranha fish.
| 3 | 3 | 26 August 1981 |
The team make camp using a parachute canopy and emergency supplies which include two rabbits and raw vegetables. But without matches how do they make a fire?
| 4 | 4 | 27 August 1981 |
The teams must build a boat, and a raft, scale the walls and avoid booby traps. Luckily the Royal Navy comes to the rescue just in time.

=== Series 2 (1982) ===
Competing again, teams from Oxford University and Cambridge University go up against each other. In this series, their mission is to retrieve an isotope from a fallen satellite, and it's a race against the clock.

| No. overall | No. in series | Original release date |
|---|---|---|
| 5 | 1 | 7 July 1982 |
The team's problems include finding a tape recorder buried in the sand, leaping into icy water to retrieve some canisters, making a generator, and flying a kite.
| 6 | 2 | 14 July 1982 |
After successfully roping down a rock face, the teams attempt to build a four-man raft. Unfortunately, the ancient art of boat-building seems to have been lost somewhere.
| 7 | 3 | 21 July 1982 |
The teams are to walk a 'Burma bridge' then cross a dyke without getting wet. But without equipment, how can they do it?
| 8 | 4 | 28 July 1982 |
The teams make camp and cook a meal from a couple of pigeons, and a few raw vegetables.
| 9 | 5 | 4 August 1982 |
The enemy catch up with the teams before they can make their escape. And somewhat improbably they end up impersonating some Arabs, but luckily help is on the way.

=== Series 3 (1983) ===
Oxford and Cambridge join forces for this series, taking on an American team. This series' challenge is to cope with the unexpected for 30 hours in the open. It's a race to blow up an enemy communications cable and escape.

| No. overall | No. in series | Original release date |
|---|---|---|
| 10 | 1 | 5 April 1983 |
The teams are dropped into 'hostile' terrain, where they must evade capture and overcome umpteen obstacles on the way to their sabotage objective.
| 11 | 2 | 12 April 1983 |
The teams are now four hours into this race against the clock. One person from each team gets captured, they meet friendly guides who cannot speak and they have to make a time bomb and crack a code.
| 12 | 3 | 19 April 1983 |
The teams reach their target, an enemy communications cable which they must destroy. They are now ten hours into this race against the clock. But their escape involves a certain amount of activity in water and so, wet, cold but undaunted, they begin the long haul home.
| 13 | 4 | 26 April 1983 |
Transport is provided to speed up this race against the clock, but somehow problems arise. Making a shelter from brushwood and cooking a meal from raw vegetables also has its moments and after 14 hours' non-stop activity, tempers are getting a little frayed.
| 14 | 5 | 3 May 1983 |
The teams, having spent a wet night in the open, now head for their final rendezvous. There are just a few problems to overcome before reaching safety and both teams, after nearly 30 hours, are neck and neck and knackered.

=== Series 4 (1984) ===
Two teams of amateur adventurers from Britain and the USA have been given the task of rescuing a defecting biochemist from enemy territory in the shortest possible time.

| No. overall | No. in series | Original release date |
|---|---|---|
| 15 | 1 | 26 June 1984 |
More than 30 hours of physical and mental effort lie ahead of them in this contest of stamina and teamwork and the first problem is how to come to terms with a parachute.
| 16 | 2 | 3 July 1984 |
The teams are three hours into their 30-hour adventure. The biochemist has had to move on, but has left clues. This episode, one of the problems is how to thread two thin wires down a 50 m (164 ft) tube.
| 17 | 3 | 10 July 1984 |
After seven-and-a-half hours of their 30-hour ordeal, the Americans have pulled out a one-and-a-half hour lead, but still no sign of the defector. The first problem this week is how to make a device that will continue to transmit an intermittent electrical signal when unattended.
| 18 | 4 | 17 July 1984 |
This episode, the biggest problems arise when the teams discover their canoes have been stolen by the enemy. So how will they get back to the mainland?
| 19 | 5 | 24 July 1984 |
The teams have spent the night on a deserted island and now have the problem of returning to the mainland to complete the task of finding and rescuing the defecting biochemist. The codewords 'flower', 'shine' and 'glasses' provide the Americans with a mind-numbing problem but the British, on the other hand, start to take chances in an attempt to whittle down the American lead.
