= Dartford Heath =

Heathland in Kent, England

Coordinates: 51.4388°N 0.1788°E

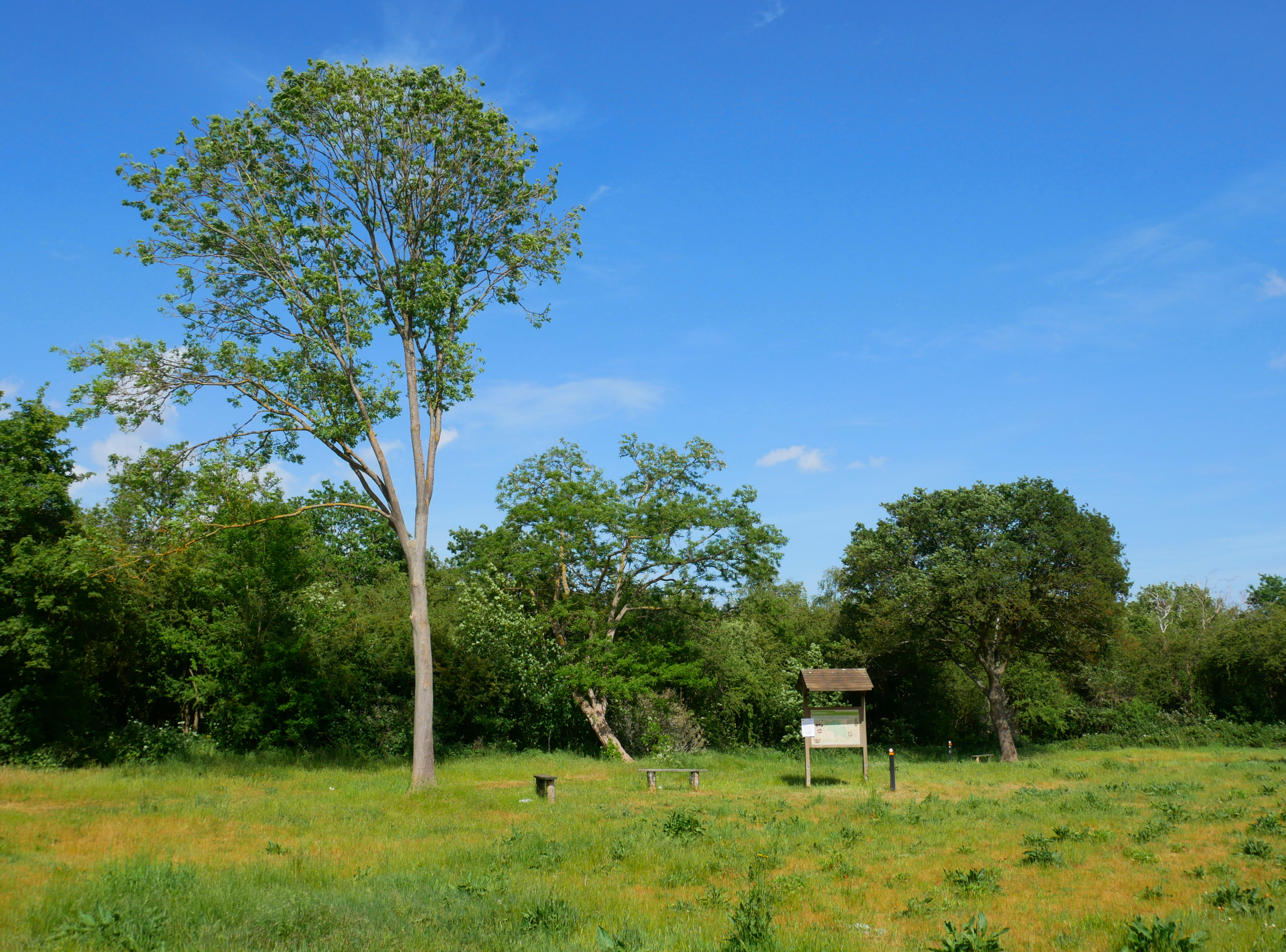
Dartford Heath as Rochester Way passes through it

Dartford Heath Common is an area of open heathland situated to the south-west of Dartford, Kent, England, that covers around 314 acres (127 ha) of open space. Dartford Heath is classified as lowland heath and is one of only two substantial heathland blocks remaining in Kent. The heath supports a number of rare plants and invertebrates, as well as reptiles, including the common lizard and slow-worm, and rabbits.

== History ==
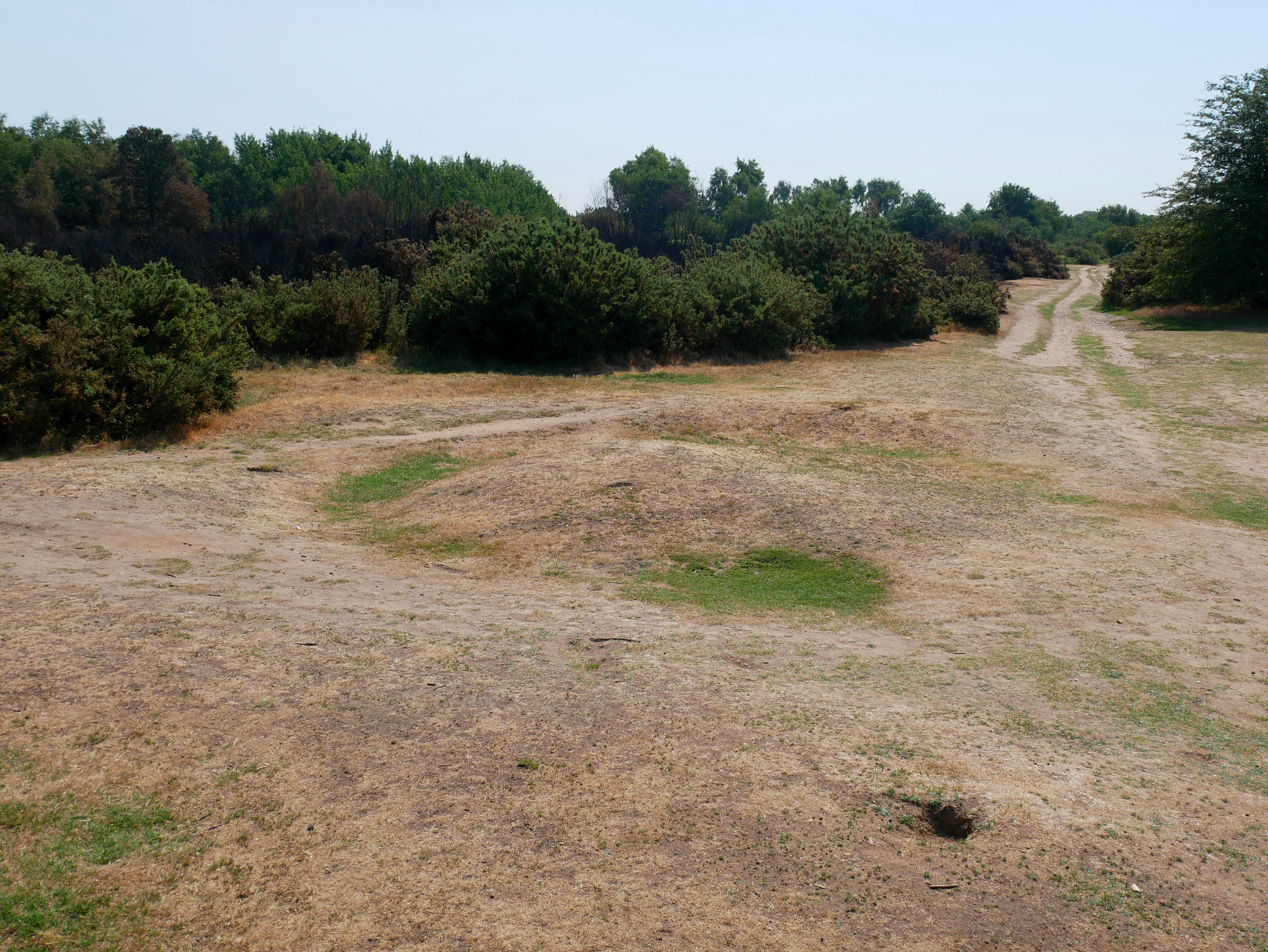
A ring ditch and tumulus on Dartford Heath, probably prehistoric in origin

Prehistoric barrows, and Stone Age and Bronze Age artefacts have been discovered on Dartford Heath in some abundance.

The heath has been important to local people since medieval times as common land; it therefore escaped enclosure during the late 18th and early 19th centuries, however during this period the heath was owned by the Tredegars and it was heavily excavated for granite, chalk and other natural resources. Many pits and holes were observed in the 1830s, some "[15 or 20] fathoms deep. At the mouth and thence downward they were narrow, like the tunnel of a chimney or the passage of a well, but at the bottom enlarged; and some had several rooms or partitions, strongly vaulted and supported with pillars of chalk".

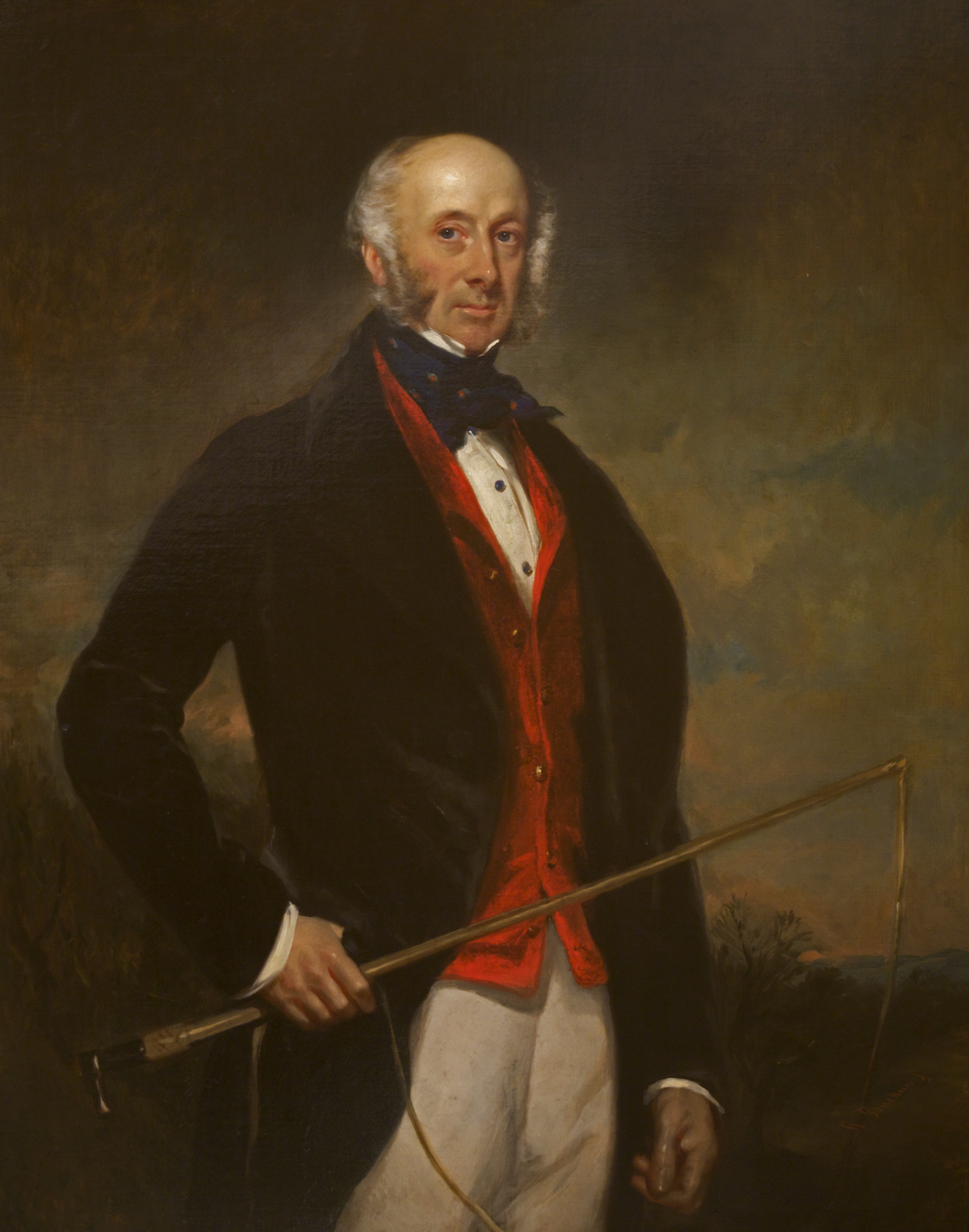
Sir Charles Morgan Robinson Morgan (1792–1875), 1st Baron Tredegar, owner of Dartford Heath

They were believed to have originally been dug for the removal of chalk, which was used in building, and in fertilising agricultural land. In his History and Antiquities of Dartford, John Dunkin quoted historian Edward Hasted, “on the authority of Tacitus”, that it was “most probable that some of them were used as secret hiding places by our Saxon ancestors, for their wives, children, and goods, in times of civil war or foreign invasion”. He added that (by 1844) “most of [the holes] are now stopped up, and thus accidents which heretofore occurred both to man and beast, are prevented”.

Dunkin noted that the 1st Baron Tredegar, the lord of the manor and owner of the heath, had restricted the public’s right of way, though his tenants were allowed to graze cattle there. In 1832 a special Court Baron was held to temporarily grant to the church wardens of Dartford, in trust, some acres of common waste land on the heath for the employment (by himself) of local poor persons, and to affirm that for, much of the remainder of the heath, the public should be given right of common. However, extensive granite, chalk and turf extractions continued until the Law of Property Act 1925 severely restricted the right of lords of the manor to deface common lands as they saw fit; at which time Courtenay Morgan, 1st Viscount Tredegar, sold the heath to Dartford Urban District Council and much of the excavation works in the area ceased.

Large dips and mounds are still visible as a result of this work and its associated industries. In the 19th century, towards the north of the heath, a series of parallel mounds known as the Glory Bumps were left after the extraction of clay for use in brickworks.

The first recorded local cricket match took place at Bowman's Lodge in 1723; and the Society of Royal Kentish Bowman, whose members included the future King George IV, met here between 1785 and 1802. The nearby area is still known as Bowmans.

Soldiers were stationed on Dartford Heath in 1779-80, and again during World War Two when a Royal Artillery anti-aircraft regiment was stationed there - the camp's tarmac roads are still in evidence.

== Present day ==
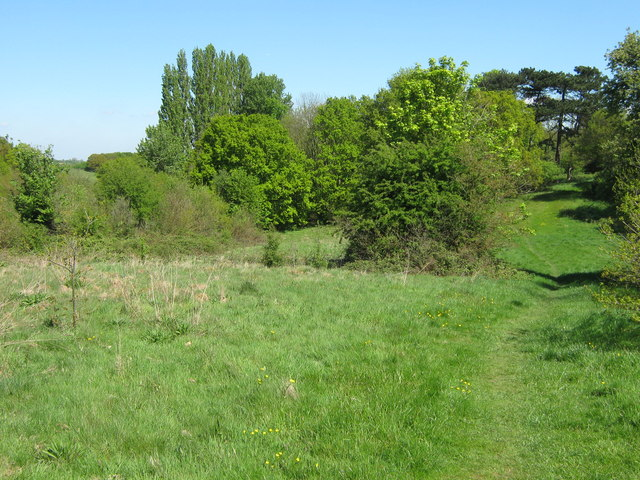
Footpath leading from Old Bexley Lane into a south-western corner of the heath.

Since 1925 the heath has largely maintained its shape and character, except for the areas destroyed by the building of the first Dartford bypass (Princes Road), circa 1930, and the A2 dual carriageway in 1973, which cut off Leyton Cross and the southernmost parts of the heath from the north.

The heath contains three ponds (Donkey Pond, Woodland Pond and North Pond), though they have occasionally dried up in recent years, and a variety of habitats: including acid grassland, broadleaved semi-natural woodland (including oak, birch, hawthorn), heather and gorse, as well as open grassland. Dartford Heath is used as a local recreation area, particularly for cyclists and dog walkers, but can be adversely affected by proximity to the local refuse and recycling centre on Old Rochester Way, which sometimes leaves windblown rubbish along nearby roads.

Management is required to maintain the heath's traditional horticulture. Efforts are centred around reduction of scrub encroachment, fire prevention, and trials to re-instate heath vegetation. The site is in a Countryside Commission stewardship scheme.

While skateboarding and other pastimes have long been banned, the heath was for some 80 years a designated model aircraft flying area. However permission was revoked in 2003 after a teenager died from head injuries when she was accidentally struck by a plane.

A small visitors' car park is situated on Heath Lane (Upper).

== Dartford warbler ==
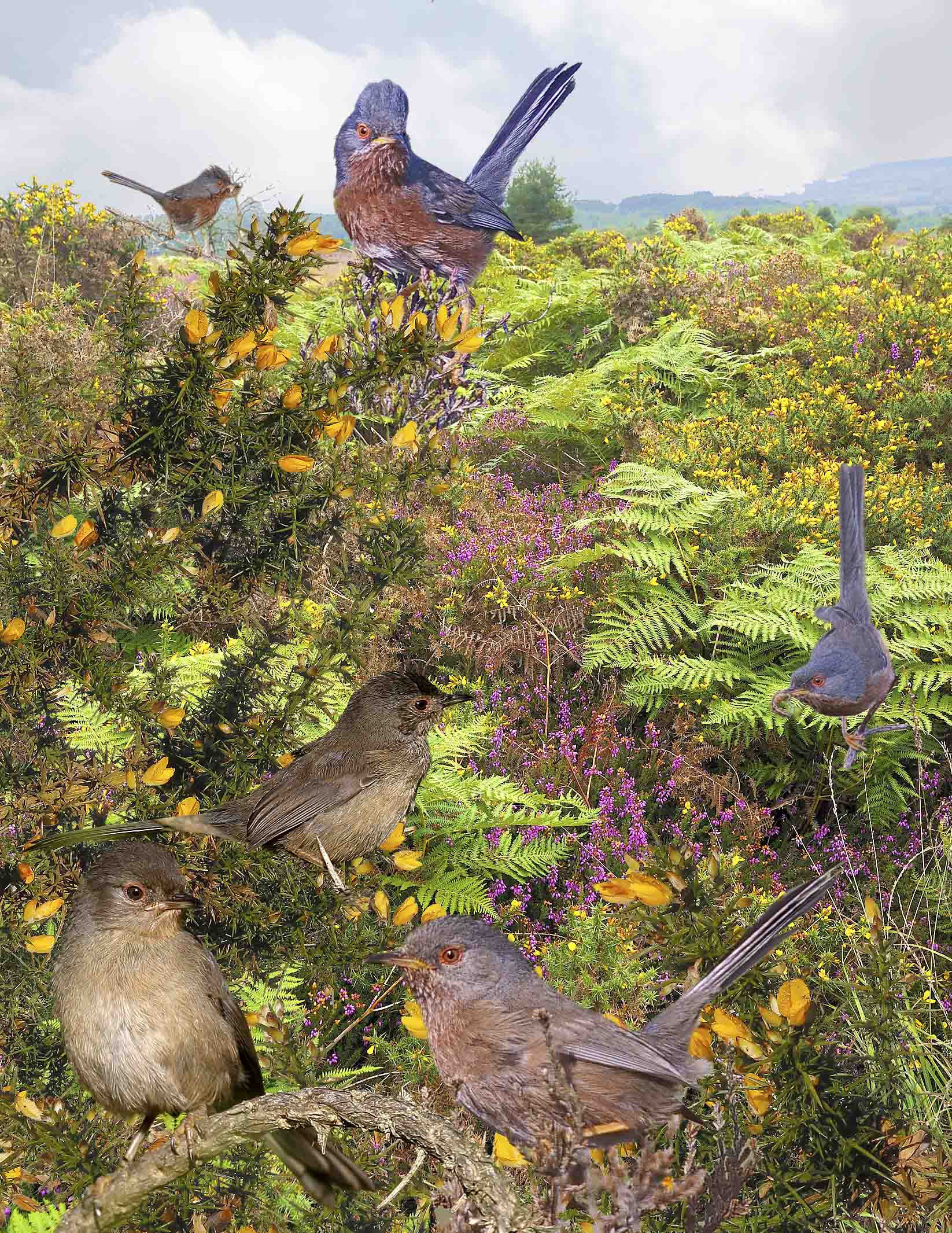
The Dartford Warbler. Image from the Crossley ID Guide to Britain and Ireland.

Dartford Heath is often mistakenly believed to be the original source for the name of the Dartford warbler; however the bird was first described in writing in 1776, after it was seen on Bexley Heath, near the town of Dartford (and parts of Bexley Heath having once been within Dartford Rural District).
