= Rawson Stovall =

American video journalist (born 1972)

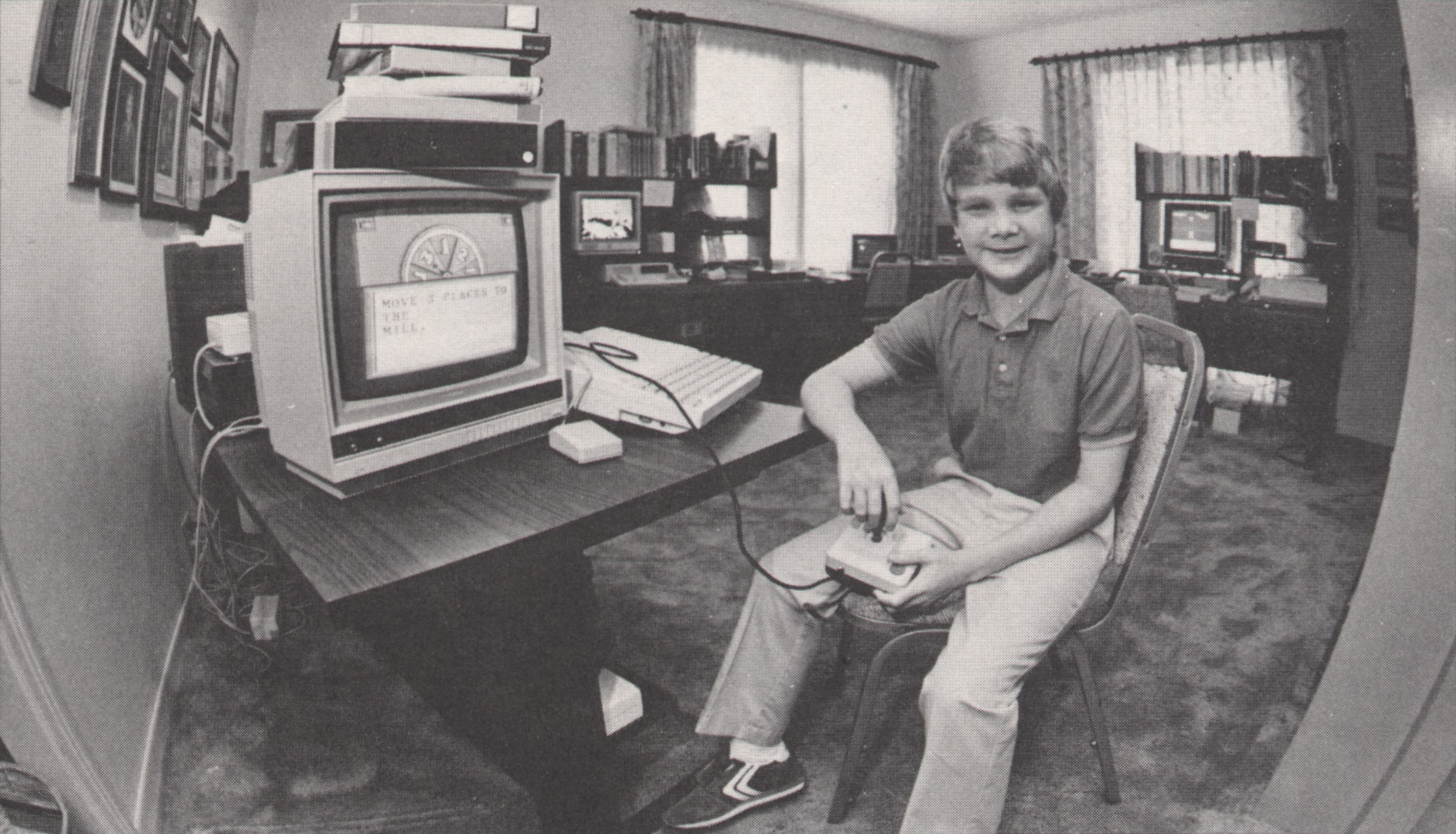
- Stovall in 1985, aged thirteen
- Born: Rawson Law Stovall; 1972 (age 53–54); Abilene, Texas, U.S.
- Education: Southern Methodist University
- Occupations: Former video game columnist; video game producer and developer
- Years active: 1982–present
- Known for: Becoming the first nationally syndicated gaming journalist in the U.S.
- Notable work: The Vid Kid's Book of Home Video Games (1984)

Rawson Law Stovall (born 1972) (Note: Stovall was thirteen in June 1985 and fourteen in January 1987, placing his birth in 1972.) is an American video game designer and producer. He started out as a video game journalist, the first to be nationally syndicated in the United States. In 1982, ten-year-old Stovall's first column appeared in the Abilene Reporter-News, his local newspaper. He got the column in ten publications before Universal Press Syndicate started distributing it in April 1983; by 1984, the column, titled "The Vid Kid", appeared in over twenty-four newspapers. After being reported on by The New York Times, Stovall was featured on The Tonight Show Starring Johnny Carson and earned a regular spot on Discovery Channel's The New Tech Times. In 1985, he helped introduce the Nintendo Entertainment System at its North American launch.

In 1990, Stovall retired from video game journalism to attend Southern Methodist University. He later worked as a game designer and producer for Sony, Activision, Electronic Arts, MGM Interactive, and most recently Concrete Software. At Electronic Arts, he produced video games in The Sims franchise.

== Biography ==
=== Early life ===
Rawson Law Stovall was born in 1972 to Ronald L. Stovall, a regional manager for the Texas State Health Department and former Boy Scouts executive; and Kay Law Stovall. He has a younger sister named Jennifer. During his childhood, Stovall lived in Abilene, Texas, where he attended Alta Vista Elementary School and Cooper High School. As a child, he had severe asthma and once spent three months at the National Jewish Hospital: he first visited an amusement arcade on one of the hospital's field trips.

Stovall first became interested in arcade video games in 1978. He rented games from the Abilene Video Library, allowing him to study the elements and patterns used by different genres and developers. However, his father saw games as a waste of time and refused to buy him an Atari 2600. After Stovall failed to get an Atari for Christmas in 1980, he prepared and packaged nuts from the pecan tree in his backyard and sold them door-to-door the next year, earning enough to buy one. (Note: As noted by Abilene Reporter-News, sources disagree on the amount Stovall earned. While estimates range around $175 to $200, Stovall said in 2011 it was around $160. Most recently, PC Gamer said he earned $220 in 2022.) In fourth grade, Stovall and two friends hosted mock television skits about video games for class. He also became the youngest person to receive the Texas Governor's Award for Outstanding Volunteer Service after he raised over $5000 for Abilene's mental health association.

=== 1982: Beginnings as a columnist ===
In the summer of 1981, Stovall was confined indoors because his asthma was triggered by the increased pollen levels, and he could not afford more games. He realized that, unlike reviews for movie and television shows, nothing similar existed for games. At the time, a movie ticket cost less than $5, while a game might cost $30–40. Video-game packaging did not consistently include screenshots. The expense and the lack of information available to consumers led Stovall to compare buying video games to a "gamble". Stovall's mother suggested he write an article about video games for the Wylie Journal, a local weekly. Stovall thought the weekly was too small and an article would be too short, so she instead proposed that he write a column for his city newspaper, the Abilene Reporter-News. He decided to do so initially to raise enough money to buy an advanced home computer on which to design games.

Stovall contacted the Reporter-News' editor Dick Tarpley, to whom he presented several sample columns and three letters of recommendation from his teachers and a local video-game repairman. Two days later, Tarpley offered him a weekly place in the paper for $5 per column. In 1982, a ten-year-old Stovall's first column, "Video Beat", appeared in the Reporter-News.

Stovall attempted to sell his column to other newspapers, but was often turned down because of his age: the guard at the San Francisco Chronicle would not even let him into the building. After several rejections by telephone, Stovall decided to enter the offices of Odessa American wearing a three-piece business suit, and carrying a briefcase and a business card. He persuaded the editor to publish his column, securing his first sale outside Abilene.

=== 1983–1990: Universal Press Syndicate and "The Vid Kid" ===
By January 1983, Rawson Stovall's column appeared in five newspapers, including El Paso Times and Young Person Magazine. His mother acted as his secretary and proofread his work, while his father, a journalism major, offered advice. Stovall was invited to video game publisher Imagic's headquarters in Silicon Valley and went on a promotional nationwide tour with their vice president Dennis Koble. San Jose Mercury News began syndicating the column and dubbed it "The Vid Kid". Stovall's column ran in ten papers before Universal Press Syndicate began distributing it in April 1983 at the suggestion of Mercury News' editor. This made the eleven-year-old Stovall the first nationally syndicated video-game journalist.

Stovall was given special permission to attend the 1983 Consumer Electronics Show (CES) in Chicago as a minor, where he interviewed Nolan Bushnell and David Crane. After a reporter at the event covered him in The New York Times, he was invited to appear on television shows such as CBS Morning News, Good Morning America, NBC Nightly News and That's Incredible! and the radio program The Rest of the Story. He attended CES in following years and was consulted by industry professionals and companies, including Activision president Jim Levy. He was later featured on the front page of The Wall Street Journal.

By 1984, Stovall's columns appeared in over twenty-four newspapers, and he charged $10 per column. That year, Stovall spoke at Bits & Bytes, the first computer trade show for children, and Doubleday published The Vid Kid's Book of Home Video Games, a compilation of his reviews. A Library Journal reviewer wrote that, while Stovall's age and writing style made the book unusual, it was average overall. Stovall and Universal Press Syndicate ended their contract later in the year by mutual agreement, but his column continued to run in the Reporter-News.

In 1985, Stovall began to lighten his schedule to make more time for school. His family visited Los Angeles for two weeks for his July 23 appearance on The Tonight Show Starring Johnny Carson. Stovall helped to introduce the Nintendo Entertainment System at its North American launch, and also began reviewing teenage-oriented software and games for his regular segment on the Discovery Channel show The New Tech Times, for which the channel paid him $850 each season. By this time, his workshop contained over six hundred video games and five computers.

Adults credited Stovall's success to his maturity and gregariousness. His mother described him as a flexible personality: "When he was with kids, he was a kid. But with grown-ups, he was mature." Executive producer Jeff Clark, who worked with Stovall on The New Tech Times, said that Stovall had the "business ability and vocabulary of a 40-year-old, but the mind-set of a thirteen-year-old". In 2009, Stovall reflected that although it was sometimes difficult to balance school, journalism and his health issues, he felt his experience in journalism was a beneficial one.

=== Later career and personal life ===
Stovall retired from journalism in 1990 to attend Southern Methodist University in Dallas. He graduated with a degree in cinema due to the lack of game-related degrees. After college, Stovall moved to Los Angeles, and worked at Sony, Activision, Electronic Arts (EA), and MGM Interactive. At Activision in the 1990s, he worked as a game developer and producer. At EA, he produced The Godfather (2006), and video games in franchises Medal of Honor and The Sims. As of 2022, he works as a senior designer on mobile games for Concrete Software, which hired him in 2014.

Stovall currently lives in the area of Minneapolis–Saint Paul. He previously lived in Redwood City, California. He is married to Jenn Marshall, who teaches art history at the University of Minnesota, with whom he has one son.

== Bibliography ==
- Stovall, Rawson (1984). The Vid Kid's Book of Home Video Games. Garden City, New York: Doubleday. ISBN 9780385193092.

== See also ==
- List of syndicated columnists
