= Dartford Library =

Public library and museum in Dartford, England

Dartford Central Library and Museum
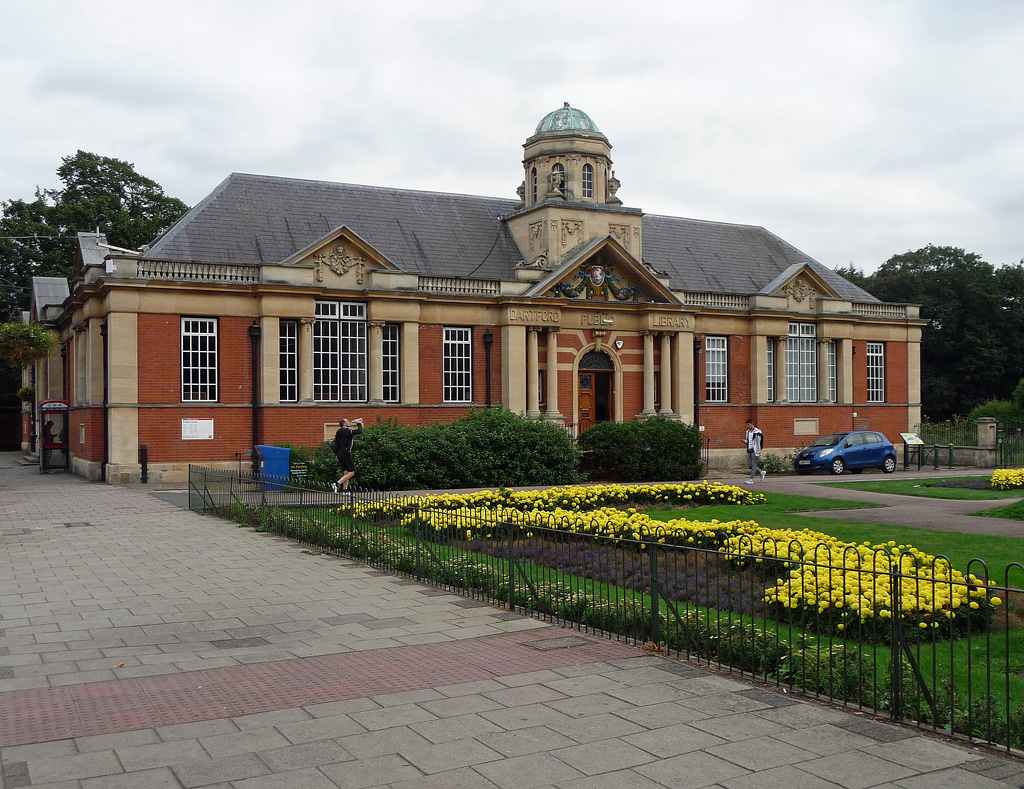
- Dartford Central Library
- 51.44314°N 0.219067°E
- Location: Central Park, Market Street, Dartford, Kent, England, England
- Type: Public library
- Established: 1 January 1916
- Architect: Thomas E. Tiffin

Access and use
- Population served: Dartford and surrounding area

Other information
- Funding: Andrew Carnegie grant

Dartford Central Library and Museum is a library in the town centre of Dartford, Kent, England.

The library was opened on 1 January 1916 by A. W. Smale, Chairman of the Dartford Urban District Council, and W. A. Ward, the Chairman of the Library Committee. Its first browsers were soldiers in World War I who were staying nearby in military hospitals, recovering from wounds received while serving in the trenches. Dartford Central Library was constructed with the aid of a grant from the philanthropist, Andrew Carnegie. It was designed by Thomas E. Tiffin AMICE, the then-Dartford Urban District Council surveyor, and built in Bath by Messrs H. Friday and Sons and Ling, using Portland and York stone.

In 1937 the library was expanded over what was once the Dartford tin works. During the Second World War its cupola dome served as an air raid watchpost.

In 2016 the library had a major refit and internal access created between it and Dartford Museum. The library also opened the Peter Blake Gallery for the display of works by local artists.

Today, Dartford Library is open Monday to Saturday from 10:00 to 16:00, with these limited hours as a result of the pandemic. It is run by Kent County Council. The library featured in Most Haunted.
