= Bowman's Lodge =

Cricket venue in Dartford, England

Coordinates: 51.441°N 0.182°E

- Interactive map of Bowman's Lodge
- Location: Dartford, Kent
- Coordinates: (approx)
- County club: Kent
- Establishment: 1795
- Last used: 1809

Bowman's Lodge is a house in Dartford, Kent, England and the location of Bowmans, an area in the north west of Dartford Heath.

The historian John Dunkin wrote in 1844 that:

On the borders of Dartford Heath is a house called Bowman's Lodge, which obtained that appellation from having been taken by the Royal Society of Kentish Bowmen...where their first meetings were held. At the formation eleven gentlemen only enrolled their names but in 1786 their numbers increased to 30 and in the following year when their meetings were removed to Dartford Heath and held every Saturday during the months of May, June, July and August they numbered 61 and when it was known to be patronized by His Royal Highness the Prince of Wales the numbers increased to 123, among whom were some of the highest nobility. The Heath again became the favourite resort of youth and beauty, assembled to behold the splendid costume of the members, and witness their skill in archery". He continued: "The house is traditionally said to have been the scene of many midnight revels and orgies. The members previous to the breaking up of the society, fitted up an apartment, in which they frequently acted plays and other dramatic pieces, to which the inhabitants of the neighbourhood were invited by tickets.

A poem presented to E.M. Potts at Bowman's Lodge, in around 1834, ran as follows:

Here knights and damsels met in splendid show Hailed the bright goddess of the silver bow, And maids of Kent, expert in piercing hearts, Supplied the archers with their eyes for darts; From Love's artillery discharged their lances And vanquish Cantia's heroes with their glances. — Ye Virgin Sisters of chaste Dian's train Have pity on the Archers ye have slain For oh, what armour can secure be found When arrows sharp as yours inflict the wound.

— Miss Talbot, "Moonshine", p.346

In 1779-80 a shop, the Suttling house, stood near Bowman's Lodge, kept by Mr. Powell of the Granby, Dartford, for the purpose of supplying troops with stationery and small stores while they were camped on the heath preparing for a foreign invasion. Bowman's Lodge was the venue for four cricket matches played between 1795 and 1809. Two matches were held between England and Hampshire in 1795. Kent played England in 1805 and the final important match at the ground came in 1809 between England and Surrey. The exact location of the ground on the heath is unknown, though the land opposite the lodge is presently laid out with football pitches and is a possible site of the cricket matches.

For about 60 years, the lodge was home to William Cracroft Fooks QC (1812–99), Barrister at Law, JP for the county of Kent. He was instrumental in the rejection of a proposal to build a ship canal from the Thames to Dartford Creek. He also organised the formation of a volunteer rifle corps in the Dartford area to prepare for a possible invasion of Britain by Napoleon III.

In the late 19th and early 20th centuries gravel was excavated in the area and numerous Palaeolithic flint implements were discovered in Bowman's Lodge Pit, which was located between the house and Chastilian Road. In the 20th century the pit was filled in and returned to heathland.

The lodge is thought to have had connections with Lord Tredegar until well into the 1900s. It was torn down in about 1987 and replaced with two modern dwellings. Swan Lane, the road running past the property, remained a dirt track until the 1980s when it was upgraded and became part of the main signposted route to Crayford from the Dartford Heath junction of the A2.
